= Huang Hsin-yao =

Taiwanese film director (born 1973)

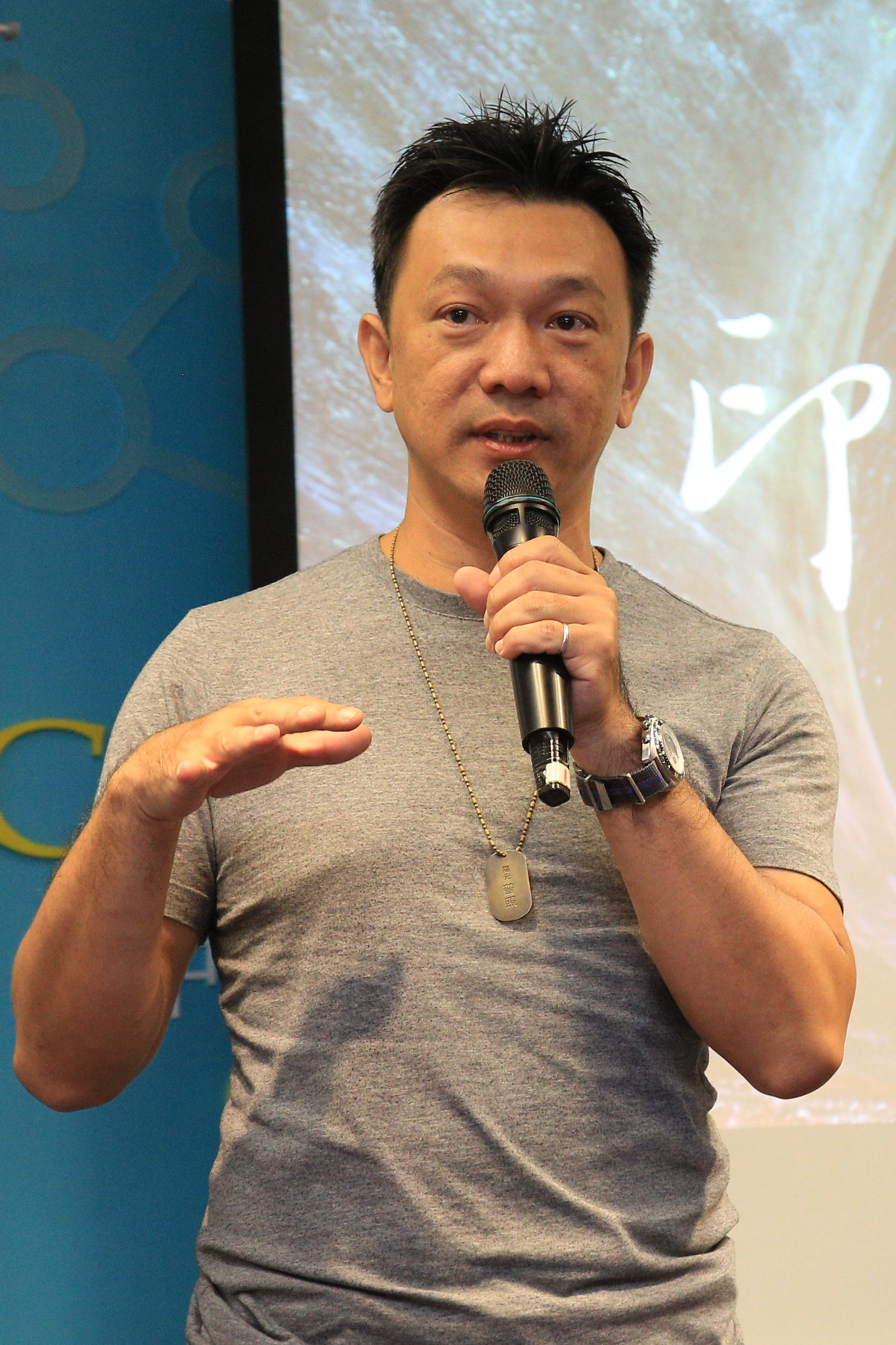
Huang in 2018

Huang Hsin-yao (born in 1973) is a Taiwanese film director. He was born and raised in Tainan City, Taiwan. He graduated from the Graduate Institute of Documentary & Film Archiving, TNNUA, and received an MFA in 2005.

Huang was one of the three executive board members of the Taipei Documentary Filmmakers' Union from 2006 to 2013. His documentary works include Bluffing (winner of Golden Harvest Awards for Best Documentary in 2007), Nimbus (winner of Special Jury Prize at Bi-annual Taiwan International Documentary Festival in 2010), and Taivalu (winner of Grand Prize and Best Documentary at Taipei Film Festival in 2011).

Huang’s debut fictional film is a short film, Da Fo (nominated for Best Live Action Short Film at Golden Horse Award in 2014), which he later developed into a feature-length, The Great Buddha + (winner of Best Adapted Screenplay and Best New Director at Golden Horse Award, and other awards at Taipei Film Festival in 2017).

== Early life ==
Born and raised in Tainan City, Taiwan, Huang Hsin-yao moved around from district to district with his family "more than twenty times since [he] was a child" before he was thirty. Since junior high, Huang has worked part-time in factories and for the Democratic Progressive Party (DPP), putting up posters and distributing flyers to support his family. The life of Martial Law and subsequent burgeoning political activities inspired him to pay attention to social issues. Later, he studied at the evening school of Chinese Culture University College of Journalism & Communication in Taipei and became active in social movements.

Huang’s interest in documentaries was kindled by the mantra of the South Digital Newsletter (Chinese: 南方電子報): "Make our own media, sing our own song (Chinese: 作自己的媒體，唱自己的歌)."He first applied for the documentary training program organized by Fullshot Film Studio (Chinese: 全景映像工作室, now named 財團法人全景傳播基金會). He then went on to study at the Graduate Institute of Documentary & Film Archiving at TNNUA and got an MFA degree.

== Career ==
Yantian Cin Zih (Chinese: 鹽田欽仔) marked Huang Hsin-yao’s first attempt as a documentary director. Shot in Yantian, Tainan City, the film follows a man who waits for compensation for the relocation and demolition of his village. It was first filmed when Huang was in the documentary training program at Fullshot Film Studio in 1998. It also motivated him to make Seaman (Chinese: 添仔的海) for his first-year assignment at graduate school later on.

During his study at TNNUA, Huang made Dog with Man (Chinese: 多格威斯麵) in 2002 about the controversial personality Ke Sìh Hǎ (Chinese: 柯賜海), who was known to stand behind politicians interviewed by news broadcasting channel with written protesting message to gain free TV coverage. For his MFA degree production, Huang made Bluffing (Chinese: 唬爛三小) in 2005, a documentary about four of his high school best friends as a social section of his generation, which received many awards, including the Golden Harvest Awards for Best Documentary.

After Bluffing Huang’s documentaries begin to focus on the relationship between humanity and the environment, including Nimbus (Chinese: 帶水雲), Taivalu (Chinese: 沈ㄕㄣˇㄇㄟˊ沒之島), and Ali-88 (Chinese: 阿里八八).

In 2014, Huang made his first fictional short film, Da Fo (Chinese: 大佛) about a murder committed by the boss of a buddha statue factory witnessed by his security guard and his friend, who collects recyclables for a living. The film attracted director Chung Mong-Hong’s (Chinese: 鍾孟宏) attention at the 51st Golden Horse Award, who encouraged Huang to develop it into a feature film he helped produced, The Great Buddha+ (Chinese: 大佛普拉斯). The feature film expands the original plot to tell a story reflecting the social discrepancy in rural Taiwan that is surrealistically realistic. The film is stylistically creative by playing with color and narrator’s voiceover. Huang was awarded Best New Director at Golden Horse Award for this film in 2017.

Huang continued to make documentaries after his successful fictional film debut. In 2015, he made Cloud Nation (Chinese: 雲之國), in which he intentionally suppresses his own presence and abandons narrator’s voiceover, for which his films were known. With no dialogue or human subject in the entire film, the film leaves the audience to determine what is documented and for what.

In 2020, Huang drew inspiration from his documentary Bluffing to make another feature film, Classmates Minus (Chinese: 同學麥娜絲) also produced by Chung Mong-Hong. The film weaves the lives of four high school classmates after they graduated from high school to provide a glimpse of the ambitions and frustrations of Taiwan’s contemporary males in their late thirties as well as their changed friendship. Huang’s colorful voiceover once again plays an active role in the film not only as a narrator but also as an invisible character. Despite the many nominations in the 57th Golden Horse Awards and 23rd Taipei Film Festival, the film only won the Best Production Design Award from both, and Best Supporting Actor (Nadow Lin) from the Golden Horse Awards.

== Filmography ==
Documentary
Year	Chinese title	English title	Notes
1999	《鹽田欽仔》	Yantian Cin Zih	No official English title
2000	《添仔的海》	Seaman	
2002	《多格威斯麵》	Dog with Man	
2005	《唬爛三小》	Bluffing	
2009	《帶水雲》	Nimbus	
2010	《沈ㄕㄣˇㄇㄟˊ沒之島》	Taivalu	
2013	《阿里八八》	A-li 88	
2015	《雲之國》	Cloud Nation	
2016	《海島》	Islands	No official English title
2018	《印樣白冷圳》	Contact Prints of Baileng Canal	
2018	《地球：奇蹟的一天》	Earth: One Amazing Day	narrator
2022	《北將七》	A Silent Gaze	

Live action short film
Year	Chinese title	English title
2014	《大佛》	Da Fo

Fiction film
Year	Chinese title	English title
2017	《大佛普拉斯》	The Great Buddha+
2020	《同學麥娜絲》	Classmates Minus

Documentary short
Year	Chinese title	English title
2006	《台中九個九》	Taichung 9 x 9
2011	《蓋國光，讓你褲子脫光光》	Anti Kuo Kuang
2012	《北將七》	Bei Jiang Chi

Music video
Year	Singer/ Song (Chinese Title)	Note
2019	張震嶽／〈貪心 Greed〉	
2020	施名帥、鄭人碩、劉冠廷、納豆／〈漏電的插頭 Leaked Plug〉	No official English title

== Awards and honors ==
Year	Title	Awards	Category
2002	Dog with Man	Taiwan International Documentary Festival	Nominated for Taiwan Competition
2005	Bluffing	Golden Harvest Awards	Best Documentary Award
2005	Bluffing	South Taiwan Film Festival	Special Award
2005	Bluffing	South Taiwan Film Festival	Audience Award
2006	Bluffing	Nanying Award	Merit Award in Documentary
2009	Nimbus	Taiwan International Documentary Festival	Special Jury Prize for Taiwan Competition
2010	Nimbus	The International Film Festival of Water, Sea & the Oceans	Free Production Award
2010	Nimbus	Taiwan Local History Film Festival	Merit Award
2010	Nimbus	Urban Nomad Film Fest	Best Taiwanese Shorts
2010	Nimbus	Nanying Award	Merit Award
2011	Taivalu	Taipei Film Festival	Million Dollar Grand Priz
2011	Taivalu	Taipei Film Festival	Best Documentary Award
2014	The Great Buddha	Golden Horse Awards	Nominated for Best Live Action Short Film
2017	The Great Buddha+	Golden Horse Awards	Best Adapted Screenplay
2017	The Great Buddha+	Golden Horse Awards	Best New Director
2017	The Great Buddha+	Taipei Film Festival	Million Dollar Grand Prize
2017	The Great Buddha+	Taipei Film Festival	Best Feature Film
2017	The Great Buddha+	Taipei Film Festival	Best Production Design
2017	The Great Buddha+	Taipei Film Festival	Best Original Score
2017	The Great Buddha+	Taipei Film Festival	Best Film Editing
2017	The Great Buddha+	Toronto International Film Festival	NETPAC Award
2017	The Great Buddha+	Munich Film Festival	Honorable Mention for CineVision Award
2017	The Great Buddha+	Mi Ying Spirit Movie Award	Jury Award
2017	The Great Buddha+	Hong Kong Asian Film Festival	New Talent Award
2020	Classmates Minus	Golden Horse Awards	Best Supporting Actor
2020	Classmates Minus	Golden Horse Awards	Best Production Design
2022	A Silent Gaze	Taiwan International Documentary Festival	Jury Special Mention Award for Asian Vision Competition
