= Golden Horse Award for Best Supporting Actor =

Taiwanese film award

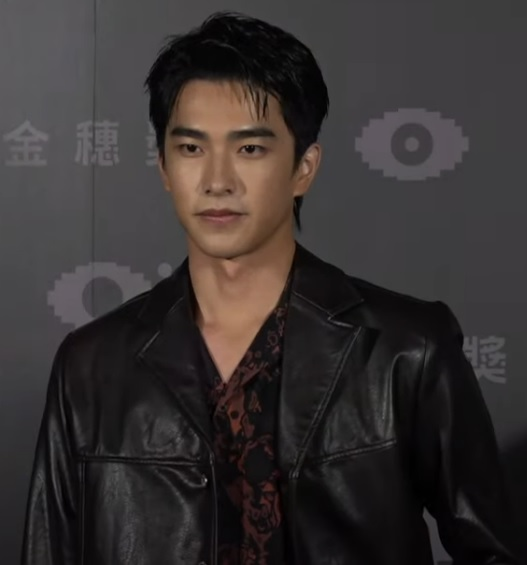
- The 2025 recipient: Tseng Jing-hua
- Awarded for: Best Performance by an Actor in a Supporting Role
- Country: Taiwan
- Presented by: Taipei Golden Horse Film Festival Executive Committee
- First award: 1962
- Currently held by: Tseng Jing-hua for Family Matters (2025)
- Website: goldenhorse.org.tw

The Golden Horse Award for Best Supporting Actor (Chinese: 金馬獎最佳男配角) is presented annually at Taiwan's Golden Horse Film Awards.

== Winners and nominees ==
indicates the winner

=== 1960s ===
Year	Actor	English title	Original title	Ref(s)
1962 (1st)
1962 (1st)	Chung Fu-tsai	Under One Roof	宜室宜家	
1963 (2nd)
1963 (2nd)	Ma Kei	Bai Yun Gu Xiang	白雲故鄉	
1965 (3rd)
1965 (3rd)	Ching Miao	Between Tears and Smiles	故都春夢	
1966 (4th)
1966 (4th)	Wu Chia-chi	The Beggar's Daughter	金玉奴	
1967 (5th)
1967 (5th)	Tsui Fu-sheng	The Monument of Virtue	貞節牌坊	
1968 (6th)
1968 (6th)	Ching Miao	Too Late for Love	烽火萬里情	
1969 (7th)
1969 (7th)	Sun Yueh	Storm Over the Yangtze River	揚子江風雲	

=== 1970s ===
Year	Actor	English title	Original title	Ref(s)
1970 (8th)
1970 (8th)	Yi Ming	Ge Sheng Mei Ying	歌聲魅影	
1971 (9th)
1971 (9th)	Wang Jung	You Can't Tell Him	庭院深深	
1972 (10th)
1972 (10th)	Wei Lung-hao	The Widow Takes Revenge	大地春雷	
1973 (11th)
1973 (11th)	Wang Yu	Operation White Shirt	突破國際死亡線	
1975 (12th)
1975 (12th)	Yi Ming	Deep in the Clouds	雲深不知處	
1976 (13th)
1976 (13th)	Sihung Lung	The Venturer	狼牙口	
1977 (14th)
1977 (14th)	Bai Ying	Dynasty	千刀萬里追	
1978 (15th)
1978 (15th)	Ting Kwok-sing	He Never Gives Up	汪洋中的一條船	
1978 (15th)	Ku Ming-lun	Sunset in Beijing City	日落北京城	
1978 (15th)	Wei Su	Everlasting Love	永恆的愛	
1979 (16th)
1979 (16th)	Yuen Siu-tien	Drunken Master	醉拳	
1979 (16th)	Han Su	A Special Smile	歡顏	
1979 (16th)	Chiang Ming	The Story of a Small Town	小城故事	

=== 1980s ===
Year	Actor	English title	Original title	Ref(s)
1980 (17th)
1980 (17th)	Chiang Ming	Good Morning, Taipei	早安台北	
1980 (17th)	Hsiang Yun-peng	The Orientation	鄉野人	
1980 (17th)	Li Xiao-fei	Gunshot at 6 in the Morning	凌晨六點槍聲	
1981 (18th)
1981 (18th)	Liu Yan-fang	The Coldest Winter in Peking	皇天后土	
1981 (18th)	George Wang	The Coldest Winter in Peking	皇天后土	
1981 (18th)	Mu Sze-cheng	The Sword of Romance	名劍風流	
1982 (19th)
1982 (19th)	Kam Hing-yin	Man on the Brink	邊緣人	
1982 (19th)	Ku Feng	Tiger Killer	武松	
1982 (19th)	Tie Meng-chu	The City	誰是無業遊民	
1983 (20th)
1983 (20th)	Chen Bor-jeng	The Sandwich Man	兒子的大玩偶	
1983 (20th)	Ku Feng	Dai Zui De Nu Hai	待罪的女孩	
1983 (20th)	Doze Niu	Growing Up	小畢的故事	
1984 (21st)
1984 (21st)	Chen Jen-lei	Old Mao's Second Spring	老莫的第二個春天	
1984 (21st)	Chang Feng	The Warmth of an Old House	頤園飄香	
1984 (21st)	Cheung Ka-nin	Law with Two Phases	公僕	
1985 (22nd)
1985 (22nd)	Cheung Ying	Love Me Love My Dad	又見冤家	
1985 (22nd)	Chen Bor-jeng	Super Citizen	超級市民	
1985 (22nd)	Ku Feng	Love Me Love My Dad	又見冤家	
1986 (23rd)
1986 (23rd)	Waise Lee	A Better Tomorrow	英雄本色	
1986 (23rd)	Paul Chun	The Lunatic	天天星期七	
1986 (23rd)	Lung Ming-yan	The Law Enforcer	公家飯	
1987 (24th)
1987 (24th)	Shih Ying	Flowers of Paradise	芳草碧連天	
1987 (24th)	Wu Ma	A Chinese Ghost Story	倩女幽魂	
1987 (24th)	Wu Ping-nan	Straw Man	稻草人	
1988 (25th)
1988 (25th)	Lam Ching-ying	Painted Faces	七小福	
1988 (25th)	Stephen Chow	Final Justice	霹靂先鋒	
1988 (25th)	Chin Tu	The Green Trees	校樹青青	
1989 (26th)
1989 (26th)	Power Chan	Thank You Sir	壯志雄心	
1989 (26th)	Chang Shih	Banana Paradise	香蕉天堂	
1989 (26th)	Wong Kwan-yuen	The Dull Ice Flower	魯冰花	

=== 1990s ===
Year	Actor	English title	Original title	Ref(s)
1990 (27th)
1990 (27th)	John Woo	Rebel From China	勇闖天下	
1990 (27th)	Jacky Cheung	The Swordsman	笑傲江湖	
1990 (27th)	Yang Ching-huang	Fraternity	兄弟珍重	
1990 (27th)	Chen Yi-da	Two Painters	兩個油漆匠	
1991 (28th)
1991 (28th)	Chan Tak-hing	Dreams of Glory: A Boxer's Story	拳王	
1991 (28th)	Kwan Hoi-san	Lee Rock	五億探長雷洛傳	
1991 (28th)	Kent Tong	The Tigers	金牌五虎將	
1991 (28th)	Tou Chung-hua	Zodiac Killers	極道追蹤	
1992 (29th)
1992 (29th)	Max Mok	Once Upon a Time in China II	黃飛鴻之II男兒當自強	
1992 (29th)	Ku Pao-ming	Secret Love for the Peach Blossom Spring	暗戀桃花源	
1992 (29th)	Kevin Lin	The Noblest Way to Die	黃金稻田	
1992 (29th)	Jen Chang-bin	Hill of No Return	無言的山丘	
1993 (30th)
1993 (30th)	Paul Chun	C'est la vie, mon chéri	新不了情	
1993 (30th)	Sihung Lung	The Wedding Banquet	喜宴	
1993 (30th)	Ng Man-tat	End of Road	異域II－孤軍	
1993 (30th)	Chang Shih	Five Girls and a Rope	五個女子和一根繩子	
1994 (31st)
1994 (31st)	Chen Chao-jung	Vive L'Amour	愛情萬歲	
1994 (31st)	Berson Wang	A Confucian Confusion	獨立時代	
1994 (31st)	Eric Kot	In Between	新同居時代	
1994 (31st)	Jordan Chan	Twenty Something	晚九朝五	
1995 (32nd)
1995 (32nd)	Kuo Tzu-chien	The Daughter-in-Law	阿爸的情人	
1995 (32nd)	Law Kar-ying	Summer Snow	女人四十	
1995 (32nd)	Lin Cheng-sheng	Tropical Fish	熱帶魚	
1995 (32nd)	Jacky Cheung	High Risk	鼠膽虎威	
1996 (33rd)
1996 (33rd)	Jordan Chan	Tonight Nobody Goes Home	今天不回家	
1996 (33rd)	Wang Chi-tsan	Mahjong	麻將	
1996 (33rd)	Doze Niu	Accidental Legend	飛天	
1997 (34th)
1997 (34th)	Poon Chan-leung	The Mad Phoenix	南海十三郎	
1997 (34th)	Chen Chin-hsing	Love Go Go	愛情來了	
1997 (34th)	Ku Pao-ming	Wolves Cry Under the Moon	國道封閉	
1997 (34th)	Eric Tsang	Comrades: Almost a Love Story	甜蜜蜜	
1998 (35th)
1998 (35th)	Ku Pao-ming	My Rice Noodle Shop	花橋榮記	
1998 (35th)	Eric Tsang	Hold You Tight	愈快樂愈墮落	
1998 (35th)	Wang Chao-ming	The Personals	徵婚啟事	
1998 (35th)	Alex Fong	Your Place or Mine!	每天愛你八小時	
1999 (36th)
1999 (36th)	Ti Lung	The Kid	流星雨	
1999 (36th)	Leon Dai	A Chance to Die	想死趁現在	
1999 (36th)	Tsai Chen-nan	Cop Abula	條子阿不拉	
1999 (36th)	Lung Shao-hua	March of Happiness	天馬茶房	

=== 2000s ===
Year	Actor	English title	Original title	Ref(s)
2000 (37th)
2000 (37th)	Lam Suet	The Mission	鎗火	
2000 (37th)	Tai Bo	The Cabbie	運轉手之戀	
2000 (37th)	Hsia Ching-ting	Hidden Whisper	小百無禁忌	
2000 (37th)	Leon Dai	Feeling by Night	夜奔	
2001 (38th)
2001 (38th)	Victor Ma	The Map of Sex and Love	情色地圖	
2001 (38th)	Patrick Tam	Born Wild	野獸之瞳	
2001 (38th)	Simon Yam	Midnight Fly	慌心假期	
2001 (38th)	Shin Ying	A Way We Go	自由門神	
2002 (39th)
2002 (39th)	Kao Meng-chieh	The Best of Times	美麗時光	
2002 (39th)	Anthony Wong	Princess D	想飛	
2002 (39th)	Duan Chun-hao	Fancy 25	三方通話	
2002 (39th)	David Morse	Double Vision	雙瞳	
2003 (40th)
2003 (40th)	Chapman To	Men Suddenly in Black	大丈夫	
2003 (40th)	Anthony Wong	Infernal Affairs	無間道	
2003 (40th)	Lam Suet	PTU	PTU	
2003 (40th)	Akio Chen	Black Dog Is Coming	黑狗來了	
2004 (41st)
2004 (41st)	Cheung Siu-fai	Throw Down	柔道龍虎榜	
2004 (41st)	Daniel Wu	New Police Story	新警察故事	
2004 (41st)	Eric Kot	A-1 Headline	A-1頭條	
2004 (41st)	Tony Leung Ka-fai	A-1 Headline	A-1頭條	
2005 (42nd)
2005 (42nd)	Alex Fong	Drink-Drank-Drunk	千杯不醉	
2005 (42nd)	Anthony Wong	Initial D	頭文字D	
2005 (42nd)	Wong Tin-lam	Election	黑社會	
2005 (42nd)	Yuen Wah	Kung Fu Hustle	功夫	
2006 (43rd)
2006 (43rd)	Chapman To	Moonlight in Tokyo	情義我心知	
2006 (43rd)	Ian Gouw	After This Our Exile	父子	
2006 (43rd)	Matt Wu	The Touch of Fate	指間的重量	
2006 (43rd)	Joseph Chang	Eternal Summer	盛夏光年	
2007 (44th)
2007 (44th)	Wu Jing	Invisible Target	男兒本色	
2007 (44th)	Tony Leung Ka-fai	The Drummer	戰‧鼓	
2007 (44th)	Joel Lok	The Home Song Stories	意	
2007 (44th)	Louis Koo	Protégé	門徒	
2008 (45th)
2008 (45th)	Eason Chan	Trivial Matters	破事兒	
2008 (45th)	Ma Ju-lung	Cape No. 7	海角七號	
2008 (45th)	Leon Dai	Parking	停車	
2008 (45th)	Hu Jun	Red Cliff	赤壁	
2009 (46th)
2009 (46th)	Tsai Chen-nan	Ending Cut	老徐的完結篇	
2009 (46th)	Wang Xueqi	Forever Enthralled	梅蘭芳	
2009 (46th)	Jag Huang	Yang Yang	陽陽	
2009 (46th)	Zhang Hanyu	The Equation of Love and Death	李米的猜想	

=== 2010s ===
Year	Actor	English title	Original title	Ref(s)
2010 (47th)
2010 (47th)	Xu Caigen	Apart Together	團圓	
2010 (47th)	Wu Pong-fong	Seven Days in Heaven	父後七日	
2010 (47th)	Nicholas Tse	Bodyguards and Assassins	十月圍城	
2010 (47th)	Kao Meng-chieh	When Love Comes	當愛來的時候	
2011 (48th)
2011 (48th)	Lawrence Ko	Jump Ashin!	翻滾吧！阿信	
2011 (48th)	Tony Liu	Revenge: A Love Story	復仇者之死	
2011 (48th)	Bokeh Kosang	Warriors of the Rainbow: Seediq Bale	賽德克．巴萊	
2011 (48th)	Jimmy Wang	Wu Xia	武俠	
2012 (49th)
2012 (49th)	Wu Gang	White Deer Plain	白鹿原	
2012 (49th)	Bryan Chang	Girlfriend, Boyfriend	女朋友。男朋友	
2012 (49th)	Ronald Cheng	Vulgaria	低俗喜劇	
2012 (49th)	Kaiser Chuang	My Dear Stilt	候鳥來的季節	
2012 (49th)	Chapman To	Diva	華麗之後	
2013 (50th)
2013 (50th)	Chen Tianwen	Ilo Ilo	爸媽不在家	
2013 (50th)	Li Xuejian	Back to 1942	一九四二	
2013 (50th)	Eddie Peng	Unbeatable	激戰	
2013 (50th)	Huang Bo	Journey to the West: Conquering the Demons	西遊降魔篇	
2013 (50th)	Tong Dawei	American Dreams in China	海闊天空	
2014 (51st)
2014 (51st)	Wang Xuebing	A Fool	一個勺子	
2014 (51st)	Ng Man-tat	Aberdeen	香港仔	
2014 (51st)	Chen Jianbin	Paradise in Service	軍中樂園	
2014 (51st)	Leon Dai	(Sex) Appeal	寒蟬效應	
2014 (51st)	Chin Shih-chieh	Brotherhood of Blades	綉春刀	
2015 (52nd)
2015 (52nd)	Cheng Jen-shuo	Thanatos, Drunk	醉‧生夢死	
2015 (52nd)	Lawrence Ko	Murmur of the Hearts	念念	
2015 (52nd)	Michael Ning	Port of Call	踏血尋梅	
2015 (52nd)	Michael Chang	The Laundryman	青田街一號	
2015 (52nd)	Wang Qianyuan	Saving Mr. Wu	解救吾先生	
2016 (53rd)
2016 (53rd)	Paul Chun	Book of Love	北京遇上西雅圖之不二情書	
2016 (53rd)	Nadow Lin	Godspeed	一路順風	
2016 (53rd)	Austin Lin	At Cafe 6	六弄咖啡館	
2016 (53rd)	Eric Tsang	Mad World	一念無明	
2016 (53rd)	Lam Suet	Robbery	老笠	
2017 (54th)
2017 (54th)	Mason Lee	Who Killed Cock Robin	目擊者	
2017 (54th)	Lei Jiayin	Brotherhood of Blades II: The Infernal Battlefield	綉春刀II修羅戰場	
2017 (54th)	Leon Dai	The Great Buddha +	大佛普拉斯	
2017 (54th)	Bamboo Chen	Alifu, the Prince/ss	阿莉芙	
2017 (54th)	Tony Leung Ka-fai	Our Time Will Come	明月幾時有	
2018 (55th)
2018 (55th)	Lee Hong-chi	Cities of Last Things	幸福城市	
2018 (55th)	Ben Yuen	Tracey	翠絲	
2018 (55th)	Tian Zhuangzhuang	Us and Them	后来的我们	
2018 (55th)	Zhang Yu	Dying to Survive	我不是药神	
2018 (55th)	Cheng Jen-shuo	Gatao 2: Rise of the King	角頭2：王者再起	
2019 (56th)
2019 (56th)	Li Ying-chuan	Synapses	那個我最親愛的陌生人	
2019 (56th)	Liu Kuan-ting	A Sun	陽光普照	
2019 (56th)	Duan Chun-hao	We Are Champions	下半場	
2019 (56th)	Koh Jia Ler	Wet Season	熱帶雨	
2019 (56th)	Yang Shi Bin	Wet Season	熱帶雨	

=== 2020s ===
Year	Actor	Film	Original title	Ref.
2020 (57th)	Nadow Lin	Classmates Minus	同學麥娜絲	
2020 (57th)	Cheng Jen-shuo	Classmates Minus	同學麥娜絲	
2020 (57th)	Michael Chang	A Leg	腿	
2020 (57th)	Leon Dai	Your Name Engraved Herein	刻在你心底的名字	
2020 (57th)	Kim Hyun-bin	The Silent Forest	無聲	
2021 (58th)	Liu Kuan-ting	Treat or Trick	詭扯	
2021 (58th)	Lung Shao-hua	Gatao - The Last Stray	角頭－浪流連	
2021 (58th)	Tse Kwan-ho	Drifting	濁水漂流	
2021 (58th)	Will Or	Drifting	濁水漂流	
2021 (58th)	Umin Boya	Till We Meet Again	月老	
2022 (59th)	Berant Zhu	Bad Education	黑的教育	
2022 (59th)	Hu Jhih-ciang	Coo-Coo 043	一家子兒咕咕叫	
2022 (59th)	Kao Ying-hsuan	Incantation	咒	
2022 (59th)	Mason Lee	Limbo	智齒	
2022 (59th)	Jung Dong-hwan	Ajoomma	花路阿朱媽	
2023 (60th)	Akio Chen	Old Fox	老狐狸	
2023 (60th)	Jack Tan	Abang Adik	富都青年	
2023 (60th)	Sean Wong	Time Still Turns the Pages	年少日記	
2023 (60th)	Fu Meng-po	Day Off	本日公休	
2023 (60th)	Bowie Lam	In Broad Daylight	白日之下	
2024 (61st)	Shih Ming-shuai	GATAO: Like Father Like Son	角頭－大橋頭	
2024 (61st)	Lee Kang-sheng	Stranger Eyes	默視錄	
2024 (61st)	Mo Tzu-yi	The Embers	餘燼	
2024 (61st)	Sam Tseng	Yen and Ai-Lee	小雁與吳愛麗	
2024 (61st)	Daniel Hong	Mongrel	白衣蒼狗	
2025 (62nd)	Tseng Jing-hua	Family Matters	我家的事	
2025 (62nd)	Chin Shih-chieh	Deep Quiet Room	深度安靜	
2025 (62nd)	Brando Huang	Left-Handed Girl	左撇子女孩	
2025 (62nd)	Yao Chun-yao	Family Matters	我家的事	
2025 (62nd)	Anthony Wong	Finch & Midland	今天應該很高興	

== Superlatives ==
Superlative	Actor	Record set
Oldest winner	Ma Ju-lung	69 years old (2008)
Oldest nominee	Wong Tin-lam	78 years old (2005)
Youngest winner / nominee	Ian Gouw	9 years old (2006)

== Multiple wins and nominations ==
The following individuals won two or more Golden Horse Awards for Best Supporting Actor:

Wins	Actor
3	Anthony Wong
2	Ku Feng
2	Ching Miao
2	Yi Ming
2	Sihung Lung
2	Liu Kuan-ting

The following individuals received three or more Best Supporting Actor nominations:

Nominations	Actor
6	Leon Dai
3	Anthony Wong
3	Ku Feng
3	Ku Pao-ming
3	Eric Tsang
3	Paul Chun
3	Tony Leung Ka-fai
3	Chapman To
3	Lam Suet
3	Cheng Jen-shuo

== See also ==
- Academy Award for Best Supporting Actor
- Asian Film Award for Best Supporting Actor
- BAFTA Award for Best Actor in a Supporting Role
- Blue Dragon Film Award for Best Supporting Actor
- Hong Kong Film Award for Best Supporting Actor
- Japan Academy Film Prize for Outstanding Performance by an Actor in a Supporting Role
