= The Falls (2021 film) =

2021 film by Chung Mong-hong

- Theatrical release poster
- Chinese: 瀑布
- Hanyu Pinyin: pùbù
- Directed by: Chung Mong-hong
- Written by: Chung Mong-hong; Chang Yao-sheng
- Produced by: Tseng Shao-chien; Arthur Chu; Tung Cheng-yu
- Starring: Alyssa Chia; Gingle Wang
- Cinematography: Chung Mong-hong
- Edited by: Lai Hsiu-hsiung
- Music by: Luming Lu
- Production companies: 3 NG Film; Oxygen Film; Mirror Fiction; Sunnano Biotech; Bossdom Digiinnovation; Sky Films Entertainment
- Distributed by: Sony Pictures
- Release dates: September 6, 2021 (Venice); October 29, 2021 (Taiwan)
- Running time: 129 minutes
- Country: Taiwan
- Language: Mandarin
- Budget: NT$70 million

The Falls (Chinese: 瀑布) is a 2021 Taiwanese drama film directed by Chung Mong-hong and written by Chung and Chang Yao-sheng. It stars Alyssa Chia and Gingle Wang, with Sung Shao-ching, Liu Liang-tso, Lee Lee-zen, Yang Li-yin, Waa Wei, and Chen Yi-wen in supporting roles. It follows a mother and daughter who, after having to quarantine together during COVID-19, are forced to confront their personal obstacles and relationship tensions.

The film had its world premiere at the 78th Venice International Film Festival on September 6, 2021, and was theatrically released in Taiwan on October 29, 2021, by Sony Pictures. It received widespread critical acclaim and was selected as the Taiwanese entry for the Best International Feature Film at the 94th Academy Awards, but it was not nominated. It earned eleven nominations at the 58th Golden Horse Awards, winning in four categories: Best Narrative Feature, Best Leading Actress (for Chia), Best Original Screenplay, and Best Original Film Score.

== Synopsis ==
When a classmate tests positive for COVID-19, high schooler Xiao Jing begins home quarantine. Her mother, Pin-wen, is asked by her company to take a leave of absence. Confined together, the already thorny mother-daughter relationship becomes strained. After several strange episodes, Pin-wen is hospitalized and diagnosed with a psychotic disorder. Only then does Xiao Jing realize her mother is truly ill. Facing sickness, unemployment, and family debts, a cloud of difficulties looms over their future. Mental illness causes the mother and daughter's lives to swerve in unexpected directions, yet it also untangles threads that have long been twisted around their hearts. Pin-wen discovers that when she falls, the only one who can catch her is her daughter.

== Cast ==
- Alyssa Chia as Lo Pin-wen
- Gingle Wang as Wang Jing
- Lee Lee-zen as Wang Qi-wen
- Chen Yi-wen as Mr. Chen
- Liu Liang-tso as superintendent of the apartment building
- Yang Li-yin as domestic helper
- Chang Shao-huai as doctor
- Hsu Wei-ning as doctor
- Liu Kuan-ting as firefighter
- Vent Teng as a customer of grocery store
- Huang Hsin-yao as an employee of superstore
- Queen Wei as Ru-yun
- Sung Shao-ching as Mr. Chen
- Waa Wei as Ru-xuan
- Hung Xiao-ling as Qi-wen's second wife
- Max Su as a news anchor

== Production ==
The story of The Falls was inspired by a friend of Chung's, whose daughter struggled with mental illness for a long time and then suddenly passed away in a tragic incident. Chung cast two lead actresses based on a single conversation with each of them, meeting them only for the second time on the first day of shooting. Principal photography began in September 2020 and was unaffected by the COVID-19 pandemic. Chung also served as the film's cinematographer.

== Release ==
The Falls premiered in the Horizons section of the 78th Venice International Film Festival on September 6, 2021, and had its North American premiere in the Special Presentations section of the 46th Toronto International Film Festival on September 13, 2021. It was also screened at the 26th Busan International Film Festival on October 7, 2021, the 33rd Palm Springs International Film Festival on January 9, 2022, and the 46th Hong Kong International Film Festival on August 17, 2022.

The film was initially scheduled for an October 8 release in Taiwan, but it was postponed to October 29, 2021 due to the COVID-19 pandemic. It was released on Netflix in over 190 countries on January 29, 2022.

== Reception ==
=== Critical response ===
On the review aggregator website Rotten Tomatoes, 89% of 9 critics' reviews are positive, with an average rating of 7.5/10.

Han Cheung of the Taipei Times wrote, "Despite the stunning cinematography, masterful use of mood and tension, relevant social commentary and great acting, the plot just feels flat, more like a winding stream than a waterfall. Every time it seems like something dramatic is about to happen, it doesn't, and even the most dire situations are solved without a hitch." Edmund Lee of the South China Morning Post described The Falls as "a mundane yet oddly engaging film that relies on Chia and Wang's quietly touching performances to sustain the narrative through bursts of unexpected drama." Carlos Aguilar of the Los Angeles Times stated, "By the nature of streaming algorithms and content dumps, The Falls might go criminally under the radar but will profoundly surprise those who cross its uncanny sights."

The film was selected as the Taiwanese entry for the Best International Feature Film at the 94th Academy Awards, marking the third time one of Chung's films had been chosen and the second year in a row.

=== Accolades ===
| Year | Award | Category | Recipient(s) | Result | Ref. |
|---|---|---|---|---|---|
| 2021 | 58th Golden Horse Awards | Best Narrative Feature | The Falls | Won | |
| 2021 | 58th Golden Horse Awards | Best Director | Chung Mong-hong | Nominated | |
| 2021 | 58th Golden Horse Awards | Best Leading Actress | Alyssa Chia | Won | |
| 2021 | 58th Golden Horse Awards | Best Leading Actress | Gingle Wang | Nominated | |
| 2021 | 58th Golden Horse Awards | Best Original Screenplay | Chung Mong-hong, Chang Yao-sheng | Won | |
| 2021 | 58th Golden Horse Awards | Best Cinematography | Chung Mong-hong | Nominated | |
| 2021 | 58th Golden Horse Awards | Best Visual Effects | Aben Lee, Peter Hsieh, Wang Yung-lun | Nominated | |
| 2021 | 58th Golden Horse Awards | Best Art Direction | Chao Shih-hao | Nominated | |
| 2021 | 58th Golden Horse Awards | Best Makeup & Costume Design | Hsu Li-wen | Nominated | |
| 2021 | 58th Golden Horse Awards | Best Original Film Score | Luming Lu | Won | |
| 2021 | 58th Golden Horse Awards | Best Film Editing | Lai Hsiu-hsiung | Nominated | |
| 2021 | 6th New Mexico Film Critics Awards | Best Actress | Alyssa Chia | Runner-up | |
| 2021 | 6th New Mexico Film Critics Awards | Best Original Screenplay | Chung Mong-hong, Chang Yao-sheng | Runner-up | |
| 2021 | 6th New Mexico Film Critics Awards | Best Foreign-Language Film | The Falls | Won | |
| 2023 | 29th Chlotrudis Awards | Best Actress | Alyssa Chia | Nominated | |

== See also ==
- List of submissions to the 94th Academy Awards for Best International Feature Film
- List of Taiwanese submissions for the Academy Award for Best International Feature Film
