= Chang Yao-sheng =

Taiwanese film director and writer

Chang Yao-sheng (Chinese: 張耀升; born 1975) is a Taiwanese film director, novelist and screenwriter.

Chang's works have been published by Mirror Fiction. His screenwriting credits include The Village of No Return (2017) and A Sun (2019).

By 2019, his screenplay for A Leg had won a NT$100,000 prize for scripts that not yet been produced at the Excellent Screenplay Awards, a ceremony organized by the Bureau of Audiovisual and Music Industry Development. A Leg became Chang's directorial debut, and alongside Huang Hsin-yao's Classmates Minus, is to open the 57th Golden Horse Awards. A Leg is one of four Taiwanese films to be shown at the 2020 Tokyo International Film Festival.
