= A Sun =

2019 Taiwanese film by Chung Mong-hong

- Theatrical release poster

Chinese name
- Traditional Chinese: 陽光普照
- Simplified Chinese: 阳光普照
- Literal meaning: Shining on all things
Transcriptions
Standard Mandarin
- Hanyu Pinyin: Yángguāng pǔzhào
- Directed by: Chung Mong-hong
- Written by: Chung Mong-hong; Chang Yao-sheng
- Produced by: Yeh Ju-feng; Tseng Shao-chien
- Starring: Chen Yi-wen; Samantha Ko; Wu Chien-ho; Liu Kuan-ting
- Cinematography: Chung Mong-hong (Note: Credited as his pseudonym Nagao Nakashima)
- Edited by: Lai Hsiu-hsiung
- Music by: Lin Sheng Xiang
- Production company: 3 NG Film
- Distributed by: Applause Entertainment (festival and theatrical); Netflix (streaming)
- Release dates: 6 September 2019 (Toronto); 1 November 2019 (Taiwan); 24 January 2020 (Netflix)
- Running time: 155 minutes
- Country: Taiwan
- Languages: Mandarin; Taiwanese Hokkien
- Budget: NT$44 million
- Box office: NT$20 million

A Sun (Chinese: 陽光普照) is a 2019 Taiwanese drama film directed and co-written by Chung Mong-hong. The film stars Chen Yi-wen, Samantha Ko, Wu Chien-ho, Greg Hsu, and Liu Kuan-ting. Its story centres on Chen Jian Ho (Wu), a troubled teenager who has been arrested, and Hao (Hsu), Ho's accomplished brother. It explores Ho's re-entry into society and his father's efforts to acknowledge his son, something he had never done. Juvenile delinquency and suicide are the film's main themes, with visual motifs including light and dark. The film, which incorporates many conventions of Asian cinema, also explores socioeconomic inequality in Taiwan.

The film was conceived after a high-school friend told Chung about a crime he had committed as a teenager. This became the opening sequence, which prefaces the narrative. Chang Yao-sheng was enlisted to co-write the screenplay with Chung, a process which took over a year. Filming began in 2018, with a tight 38-day schedule for budgetary reasons. Chung asked the cast not to consult him about their acting and rehearse on their own, although he would often direct them during filming. He was also the film's cinematographer under the pseudonym of Nagao Nakashima. Lai Hsiu-hsiung edited the film to a runtime of 155 minutes, Chung's longest film by far, and Lin Sheng Xiang composed the score.

A Sun premiered at the Toronto International Film Festival on 6 September 2019, before its theatrical release in Taiwan. The film under-performed financially, as did Chung's previous films. It was released on Netflix in 2020; poor marketing contributed to it receiving little attention, before Peter Debruge of Variety called it the best film of 2020. The film received many positive reviews for its story, diversity of themes, audiovisual quality, and acting. It received a number of accolades, including 11 nominations at the 56th Golden Horse Awards; it received the Best Feature Film award and the Best Director award for Chung. The film was the Taiwanese entry for Best International Feature Film at the 93rd Academy Awards, where it made the 15-film shortlist.

== Plot ==
In 2013 Taipei, troubled teenager Chen Jian-ho and his friend, Radish, approach a young man named Oden at a restaurant; to Ho's surprise, Radish cuts off Oden's hand with a machete. Ho is sentenced to juvenile detention, and Radish receives a harsher sentence. Ho's father, Wen, disowns him; however, his wife Qin still visits their son in prison. Wen focuses on Ho's shy older brother, Hao, who is attending a cram school in preparation for medical school. Wen is pestered for money at his job as a driving instructor by Oden's father; he refuses to pay, claiming no legal responsibility because his son did not injure Oden.

Fifteen-year-old Wang Ming-yu and her guardian, Yin, meet Qin; she is pregnant with Ho's child. Although Qin supports Yu throughout the pregnancy, Ho is not informed of it. Hao tells him, and Ho rages against the longtime secrecy. When Hao commits suicide by jumping from the apartment balcony, Hao's romantic interest Guo Xiao-zhen tells Qin that Hao felt overwhelmed by the constant attention and scrutiny on him, and had nowhere to be alone. Ho and Yu marry; Wen continues to ignore him when he is released a year and a half later, and Ho works at a car wash to support his family. Wen, tormented by visions of his dead son, goes out one night to buy cigarettes. He sees Ho at a convenience store at which his son had taken a night shift; they speak briefly about Hao, and seem to reconcile.

Ho is approached for money three years later by the recently released Radish, but he refuses. Radish later tells him to fire a gun at a legislator's office, and he grudgingly does so. Wen offers him money to stay away from his son; Radish refuses, and visits Ho late at night at the car wash, coercing him to borrow a client's car and go for a drive. They stop on a highway, where Radish tells him to enter a forest and deliver a package; he is paid a large sum of money. Upon returning, Radish is missing, and he flees.

A group of thugs kidnap Ho sometime later and demand the money because Radish was found dead. After Ho complies, they beat him, give him another large sum of money, and drop him off. Atop Qixing Mountain, Wen tells Qin that he had been skipping work to tail Ho and Radish. Wen saw their late-night drive, then attacked Radish when Ho left to get the money, dragging Radish into the forest and killing him with a rock. As Qin reacts in horror, Wen explains that this was the best way he could think of to help his only remaining son.

Ho and his mother later bond over a stack of old notebooks which Wen had given Hao at medical school, each labeled with Wen's motto: "Seize the day, decide your path"; (Note: Chinese: "把握時間 掌握方向") all are empty. Ho steals a bicycle and he and Qin ride it through a park, the ambivalent Qin gazing at the surrounding scenery.

== Cast ==
Supporting cast
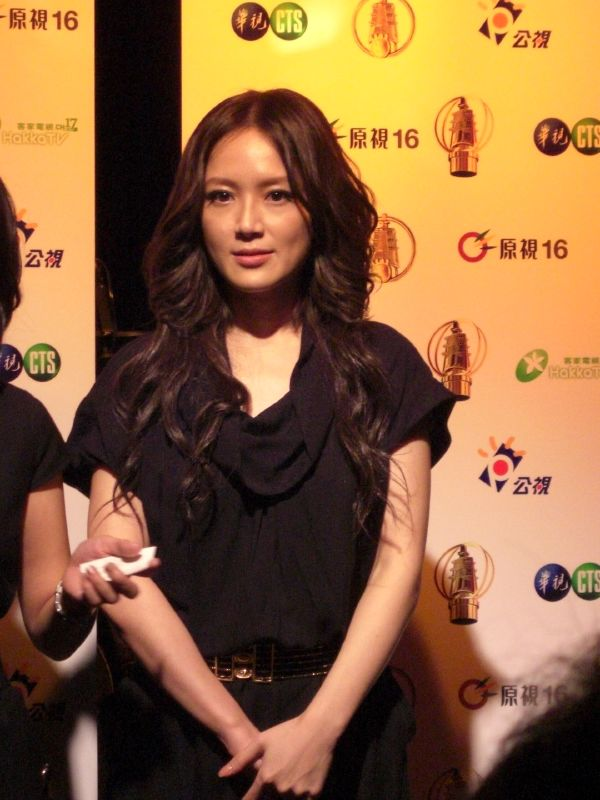
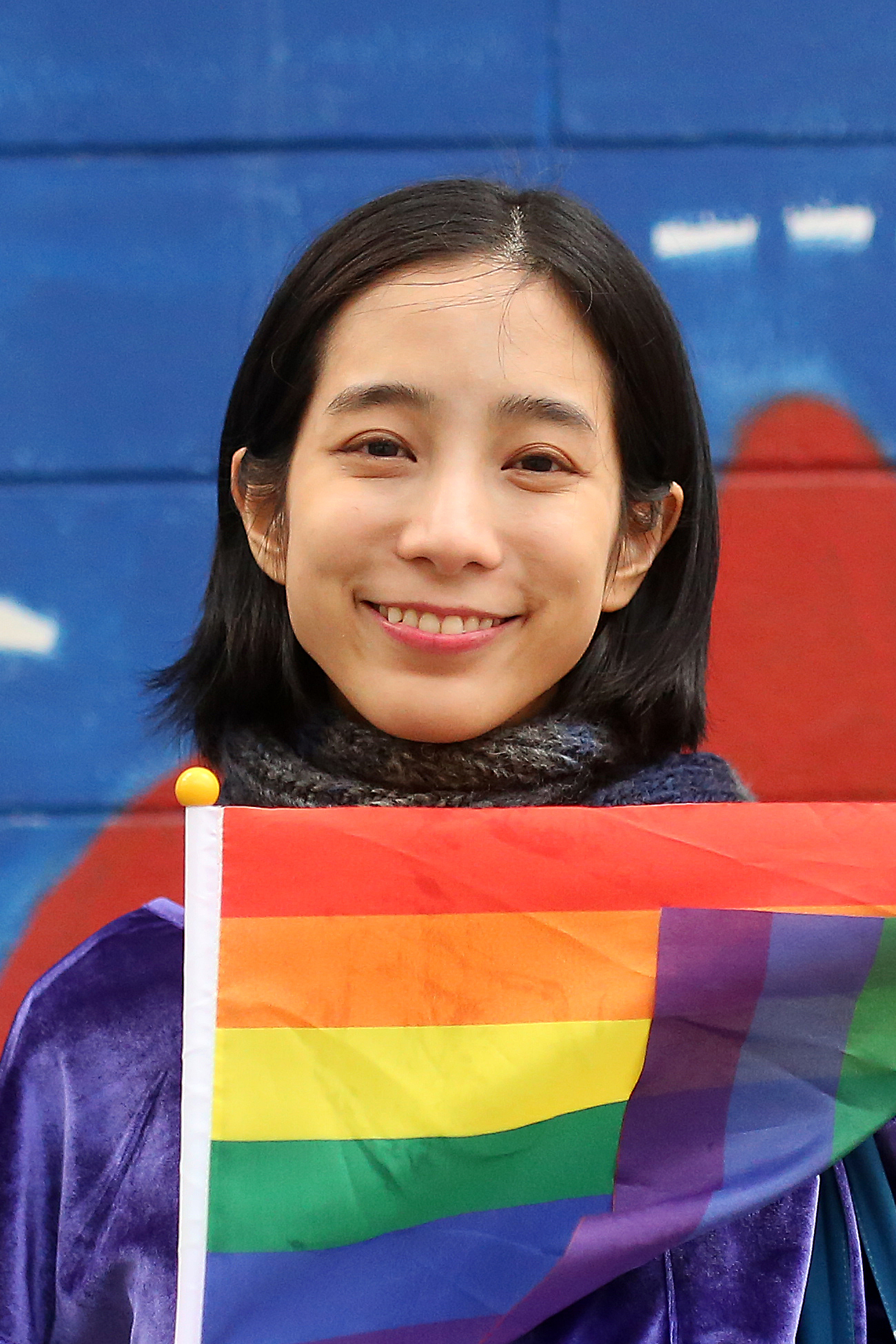
Ivy Yin (left, pictured 2008) and Wen Chen-ling (pictured 2016)
- Chen Yi-wen as Wen (文), father of Chen Jian-ho and Hao and husband of Qin. He works as a driving instructor; his driving school has the slogan "Seize the day, decide your path", which he uses as a moral principle.
- Samantha Ko as Qin (琴姐), mother of Ho and Hao and wife of Wen. She owns and is a hairdresser for a salon, which she relocates midway through the film.
- Wu Chien-ho as Chen Jian-ho (陳建和), son of Wen and Qi and younger brother of Hao. He and Radish are imprisoned for assault, but he receives a lighter sentence. He impregnates Xiao Yu, short before going to prison. Then he marries her before his release. After his release, he works as a car washer and a cashier to support his wife and baby.
- Greg Hsu as Chen Jian-hao (陳建豪), son of Wen and Qi and elder brother of Ho. The more accomplished and better-mannered son, he is studying to prepare for medical school. He becomes depressed and commits suicide.
- Liu Kuan-ting as Radish (菜頭, Cài tóu), who orders Ho to follow him in the assault. After his release, he offers Ho criminal jobs for extra money, as a form of ransom for what happened in the past.
- Apple Wu as Wang Ming-yu (王明玉), a 15-year-old, ninth-grade student impregnated by Ho. Qin supports her throughout her pregnancy, and later Yu works as a hairdresser alongside Qin, who taught her. She is colloquially referred to as Xiao Yu.
- Wen Chen-ling as Guo Xiao-zhen (郭曉貞), Hao's classmate and romantic interest, who notices his gradual descent into depression and receives his poetic suicide text.
- Ivy Yin as Yin (姐), Yu's aunt, who has raised her since the girl was orphaned at age 5 after a car accident in which the bus she was riding in with her family caught fire, causing the death of both her parents.

== Production ==
=== Background and pre-production ===
With a painful howl, a hand is slashed off by the wrist. The hand drops into a pot of boiling soup. The wrist hangs lonely at the side of the pot. The victim is screaming. The wound is bleeding like a running tap. Blood is spraying all over the place. A-[H]o stands staring at everything in front of him. It happens too fast for him to react. He never imagined that a confrontation would end this way. He doesn’t even know that his troubles are just emerging. Many more disasters are waiting for him ahead.

— Chung Mong-hong beginning the screenplay of A Sun, prefacing the film's succeeding events

Director Chung Mong-hong conceived A Sun when he met his once-troubled high-school friend, who told him about how he and his friend had cut off someone's hand in his youth and how it affected him psychologically for some time. Later, while having dinner with friends and family, he visualized a hand boiling in a hot pot; this drove him to write the film. After writing the opening sequence, Chung began to think about suicide (a common occurrence in Taiwan) and the familial and social effects of suicide and juvenile delinquency. The family members were given a traditional upbringing. Although no other films were creative inspirations, he later discovered that the plot is reminiscent of Fargo (1996); the latter begins with a light scene, followed by a lingering chaos. With making A Sun, Chung also aimed to explore the unknown within the story's themes.

Chung wanted another person to write the screenplay, but struggled to find the right person. He called Chang Yao-sheng perfect: collaborative and analytical, with a novelist's style. According to Chung, this helped him and others understand the feelings he wanted to evoke. He had finished a rough screenplay, with core elements of the film, in 40 days. He employed a typist to outpour his stream of thoughts onto the screenplay. The collaborative nature of producing A Sun was new to Chung, who had worked harder on his previous films; he described those films as worse, and called A Sun more stylistically diverse. As co-writer of the screenplay, Chung struggled to develop the characters; he wanted everyone in the story to be involved in driving it, saying that that would give the characters "life." Chang researched juvenile delinquency, and interviewed a former juvenile delinquent to ensure a realistic depiction. One year was spent on writing the film.

When casting the film, Chung wanted a four-person family and for its adult characters to be around his age. Chen Yi-wen was the first to be cast as Wen. He and Chung had collaborated in Godspeed (2016), and Chung believed that Chen could do justice to Wen (whom he described as unsuccessful and "a useless father"). He called Chen "fun" and stylistically unique. Chung equated the father's mind–body dualism with sunshine and shadow, related but separated. Greg Hsu met Chung twice before being cast as Hao, and noted his awkward communication. Wu Jian-he, preparing for his role as Ho at least six or seven months before, talked with teenagers who had been imprisoned; this gave him insight into the merciless atmosphere of a prison. Chung did not try to develop a deep relationship with the cast, and conducted no group preparations; he simply asked them to bring the screenplay home, learn their characters, and come on set to portray them. He largely attributed this to his lack of knowledge about acting.

Investors included Chung's 3 NG Film (also its production company), MandarinVision, Eight Eight Nine Films, MirrorFiction and UNI Connect Broadcast Production. The Ministry of Culture supported the production, and Chung’s frequent collaborator Yeh Ju-feng and his wife Tseng Shao-Chien were producers. Yeh found the last two lines of the screenplay memorable; they translate as "Ah-Ho takes his mother for a ride on a bicycle, and the sun dazzlingly shines on the fallen leaves, bit by bit". (Note: Chinese: "阿和騎腳踏車載著媽媽，陽光一片一片灑進落葉裡，燦爛奪目。")

=== Filming ===
Principal photography of A Sun began in September 2018 and took 38 days, a tight schedule given the film's 155-minute runtime. Chung attributed the schedule to the lack of popularity of his films in the Taiwanese market. Its financing was not completed during filming, a recurring problem with Chung's films. Eventually, the team settled a budget of NT$ 44 million (US$1,500,000 as of 2018). Despite his desire to use film stock, Chung decided to use digital cinematography instead; he said that the warmth of a film (characteristic of film stock) is not solely dependent on the medium, but on the production collaboration.

The latter part of the opening sequence was shot on the first day; it was the most lighthearted day for Chung, who remembered laughing at the model hand in the soup. Area gangsters appeared as extras. The opening shots of Ho and Radish riding a motorcycle were filmed in July 2018, during Typhoon Maria. Filming required a quick call for the production team to rush to Civic Boulevard. Since Chung was satisfied by the windy rain, he told actors Wu and Liu Kuan-ting to stop riding as soon as the camera stopped filming. During a scene in which Ho is beaten by fellow inmates, the production team did not want Wu to be injured; cast members were told to ease up but keep the fight looking realistic.

Most of the film, including the scene where Wen confesses his murder of Radish to Qin, was filmed in daylight; blue represents sorrow, and the yellow sunlight represents warmth. Chung had originally wanted Qin to be more restrained in her reaction, but realized that the melodrama was unavoidable.

Because of the film's solar motif, the weather largely determined its shooting schedule; this often meant changing a scheduled time to be able to film scenes in daylight. The Qixing Mountain scene was achieved by waiting during the filming days for a day when several weather forecasts predicted sunlight. Blue and yellow were chosen as the main colour tones. According to Chung, blue represents sorrow and apathy, and yellow represents warmth. The final shot (with the Sun shining through leaves) was challenging to film, although it is a common phenomenon when driving. The mountain scene was backlit with sunlight, often blocked to evoke the scene's dualism. Chung had considered depicting Hao's death, but decided to allude to it by having him exit as the camera looks at the opposing wall and his shadow grows.

During filming, Chung remembered not feeling confident that the film would work. A Sun is a melodrama; more familiar with art films, he struggled to balance the genres. Chung originally wanted the mountain scene to be more cooler and more restrained, but later understood that melodramatic elements are often inevitable. He would often scold the cast and crew, annoying them; during editing, he saw that their scenes were effective and well-executed. Dark humor has its moments in the film, such as raw sewage being sprayed on Wen's workplace from what seems like a proton pack from the Ghostbusters films. This kind of humor was reminiscent of Chung's previous films as well.

Like his other films, A Sun was filmed by Chung under the pseudonym of Nagao Nakashima. According to Chung, his role as director-cinematographer was easier in this film. He came to think of the camera as "a very powerful tool", through which he could analyze the cast's every move as director. The cast would often be interrupted when Chung felt their performances were substandard, occasionally disturbing the sound mixers. He considers cinematography a tool to depict the scope of a scene: "As long as the lighting and colors are right, the atmosphere will pop out as the actors step in," he said. Despite pushing the cast, he also allowed for fluidity. Chung has cited Raising Arizona (1987), Stranger Than Paradise (1984), Down by Law (1986), and Lost Highway (1997) as influences, and the cinematography of Last Tango in Paris (1972) was also an inspiration. Chung would keep the camera recording until his vision was achieved, a technique he used since he filmed car commercials early in his career.

=== Post-production ===
A Sun was edited by Lai Hsiu-hsiung, who had collaborated with Chung on Godspeed, The Great Buddha+, and Xiao Mei (2018). With a running time of 155 minutes, it is Chung's longest film by far, which the production team agreed on as being the right length. The film's sound designer Tu Duu-chih, known for his work on Millennium Mambo (2001), initially proposed trimming it; others said, though, that every scene in the final cut is important.

In the film, Hao tells a dark version of the story of Sima Guang. In Hao's version, Sima Guang and several children are playing hide-and-seek. When everyone is caught, he insists that one person is still missing. They reach a water tank and break it open, revealing another Sima Guang hiding in the darkness. Reviewing the scene, Chung felt that it needed animation to be more effective. Three-dimensional computer animation was unavailable in Taiwan and he did not want to spoil the scene's emotion, so he commissioned Chung Shao-chun, a hand-drawn animator who has acquired a specific style. After showing him a rough cut, the animator collaborated with Chung to give the one-minute scene "the feeling of an ambiguous personal pursuit." The animation, as well as visual effects, were under the banner of XYImage

==== Music ====
"動物園" ("The Zoo")
An excerpt from Hao's theme, played after his funeral and during the film's ending. The film score evokes gracefulness amid the film's sentimental plot; on this track, French horns suggest warmth.

The 17-track film score was composed by Lin Sheng-xiang, who also composed the score for Chung's The Great Buddha+ (2017). In early 2018, Chung described the opening sequence to him. During filming, he told Lin to write the music for the funeral scene and perform it live while filming. He assembled bassist Toru Hayakawa and harmonicist Toru Fujii to perform four versions of the music at a rented studio in Taipei, followed by a live version at the funeral home the next morning. The scene was heavily edited, however; a montage was used, accompanied by the music.

To compose A Sun's score, Lin studied classical music and slide guitar; the latter was achieved by cutting stainless steel pipes. His philosophy was, "Let the music follow the characters and the story, and as soon as you hear the music, it can evoke feelings towards the film." (Note: Chinese: "讓音樂跟著人物，隨著故事反覆出現，只要一聽到音樂，可以召喚你對這部電影的感覺，那就是我想要達到的。") Sadness receives a touch of grace, and Lin tried to avoid boredom or sensationalism. He considered the score an "invisible cast", with a major role in amplifying the characters' emotions, and the film's dualism was an influence. A variety of musical and cultural backgrounds diversify the score. Lin also collaborated with musicians from Taiwan and two audio engineers, from Taiwan (Zen Chien) and Germany (Wolfgang Obrecht), whom he considered outstanding.

Each family member has their own theme music, played in a variety of styles to depict the film's plot development. Hao's theme is heard four times; one version, "動物園" ("The Zoo"), uses a French horn to evoke warmth. Ho's theme was derived from "縣道184" ("Country Road 184"), a song on the album 菊花夜行軍 (The Night March of the Chrysanthemums), with rearranged chords and rhythm. Wen's theme, "把握時間 掌握方向" ("Seize the Day, Decide Your Path"), is heard three times. Lin was inspired to write the song after seeing, on set, the scene in which Wen awakens after a nightmare about Hao. An organ and guitar were used. Other instruments include a yueqin, double bass, violin, viola, and synthesizers.

"花心" ("Flowery Heart"), a song by Wakin Chau, is sung by Ho's fellow inmates before his release from prison. The end credits song, "遠行" ("Distant Journey") is a sung version of Hao's theme. Its lyrics tell the story of a person who "wanted to be the most distant star"; after venting to an acquaintance, he points to the night sky, and surrenders his life to it. The soundtrack album was released on 25 October 2019 on compact disc, and digitally four days later. It was produced and published by Foothills Folk, and distributed by Feeling Good Music.

Track listing for A Sun (Original Motion Picture Soundtrack)
No.	Title	Length
1.	"他坐在哪裡" ("Where's He Sitting?")	2:21
2.	"阿和進去了" ("A-Ho in Jail")	2:33
3.	"這樣對大家都好 鋼琴版" ("It's Good for Everybody (Piano Version)")	2:33
4.	"關我什麼事?" ("What's That to Do with Me?")	2:57
5.	"三鞠躬" ("Three Bows")	3:03
6.	"動物園" ("The Zoo")	3:27
7.	"太陽" ("The Sun")	2:09
8.	"這樣對大家都好 吉他絃樂版" ("It's Good for Everybody (Guitar & String Version)")	1:39
9.	"把握時間 掌握方向 1" ("Seize the Day, Decide Your Path 1")	2:21
10.	"把握時間 掌握方向 2" ("Seize the Day, Decide Your Path 2")	3:09
11.	"你車上有煙灰缸嗎?" ("Does Your Car Have an Ashtray?")	3:23
12.	"把握時間 掌握方向 3" ("Seize the Day, Decide Your Path 3")	2:35
13.	"算我欠你的" ("Let's Say I Owe You")	4:54
14.	"滿口袋的錢" ("A Pocket Full of Money")	2:13
15.	"我只是一個駕訓班教練" ("I'm Only a Driving Instructor")	3:13
16.	"陳教練你有幾個小孩?" ("Instructor Chen, How Many Children Do You Have?")	2:00
17.	"遠行" ("Distant Journey")	5:18
Total length:		49:48

=== Titles ===
The film's title design for Netflix

The original title of the film, in traditional Chinese characters, is 陽光普照 (pinyin: Yángguāng Pǔzhào; lit. 'Shining on All Things'). It is taken from the last fragment of the last sentence of Hao's suicide text, which reads: "I [...] wished [...] that I could hide in the shade. [...] But I could not. I had no water tanks, no shades, just sunlight. 24 hours uninterrupted, radiant and warm, shining on all things." (Note: Chinese: 我 [...] 希望 [...] 有一些阴影可以躲起来。[...] 可是我没有。我没有水缸，没有暗处，只有阳光。24小时从不间断，明亮温暖，阳光普照。) Chung had always wanted a film of his to be composed of four characters with positive connotations, however ironic in context.

Academic and filmmaker Jerry Carlson interviewed Chung, who mentioned the film, in 2019. Chung had already thought of its English title as A Sun; he was uncertain, however, since the Solar System only has one sun. After hearing the film's plot, Carlson approved of the title despite the grammatical error. Chung came to realize that the universe consists of more than one sun, and was aware of the homonyms "a Sun" and "a son". In the film, Wen lies that he only has one son (Hao); he disowned Ho. He also deludes himself that he is living in accordance with his motto of "seize the day, decide your path", and Chung wanted to explore the effects of delusion in A Sun.

== Themes ==
According to Chung, his intention with A Sun was to explore the familial and social effects of juvenile imprisonment and suicide. The film, he said, is not about joy but a reflection about family, society, and life's hardships.

Its motifs of light and dark have been discussed, and Chung said that the Sun symbolizes hope. The family's love is like sunshine, with shadows: personal secrecy and a lack of space to open up. Chung said, "We have all been hurt, so much so that we can be each other's Sun." (Note: Chinese: "我們都曾受過傷，才能成為彼此的太陽。") Family is not depicted as utopian, but a place where everyone shares the same values and intentions – like shade in a sunlit expanse. Wen's mind–body dualism is symbolized as he and Qin hike up Qixing Mountain, traversing light and dark. The film's upbeat scenes primarily appear as sunlight, before the approach of shadows and bad weather. Hao personifies everyday pressures. In his confession scene, Wen is behind the Sun (symbolizing the pressure of truth on him); Qin is facing the Sun, as she slowly learns the truth. Wen confesses outdoors, symbolizing his self-imposed natural pressure; Hao's suicide-text scene is intercut with shots of him in the city, symbolizing the pressure placed on him by society.

Chung challenges the idea that parents unconditionally love their children, arguing that children need understanding as well as love. The family has archetypically strict, traditional parents. The film's depiction of Taiwanese family dynamics is said to be accurate: family members are often discordant and distant despite loving each other. Silence is also an integral element in the film, as it sparks misunderstandings and incidents. Wen is a central figure, treating the other characters a certain way while their reactions are reflected on him. In light of this disconnection, understanding is a central theme of the film. The film's depiction of parental favoritism has been compared to that of Waves (2019) and Ordinary People (1980). A Sun is also seen as gently critical of a patriarchal society. Fathers like Wen can neglect their children with poor (or no) communication, although Wen's murder of Radish is quasi-heroic. In cultural discourse analysis, this and Hao's suicide are both seen as a conflict between personal agency and futility. Wen is described as ignorant and mean on the surface, but has good intentions and is confused about how to implement them.

The film also defies absolutist characterizations. Chung said that it has no binary characterization, and personalities periodically change. Sylvia Cheng of Elle said that no characters in the film can be directly attributed to the conflicts; "every family is riddled with holes", and "life is a process of constant mistakes". Although Hao's suicide may have some roots in his personality, the main cause is the familial pressure set on him, something that does occur often in real life. In the final scene, Qin gazes at the sunny scenery with a slightly-joyful look, although she is tormented by what happened to her two sons. The film also suggests that sometimes, misery and hardships are needed to expose secrets, and either the relationship breaks or refreshes. In a structural analysis, Hao can be seen as a manifestation of good and Radish a manifestation of evil. In a post-structuralist analysis, however, both characters are simply a moral message to Ho. Hao and Radish die because of their unrealistic natures, their deaths shaping Ho's identity as a realistic mix of good and evil. Although Radish is depicted as antagonistic, his background makes his behavior pardonable.

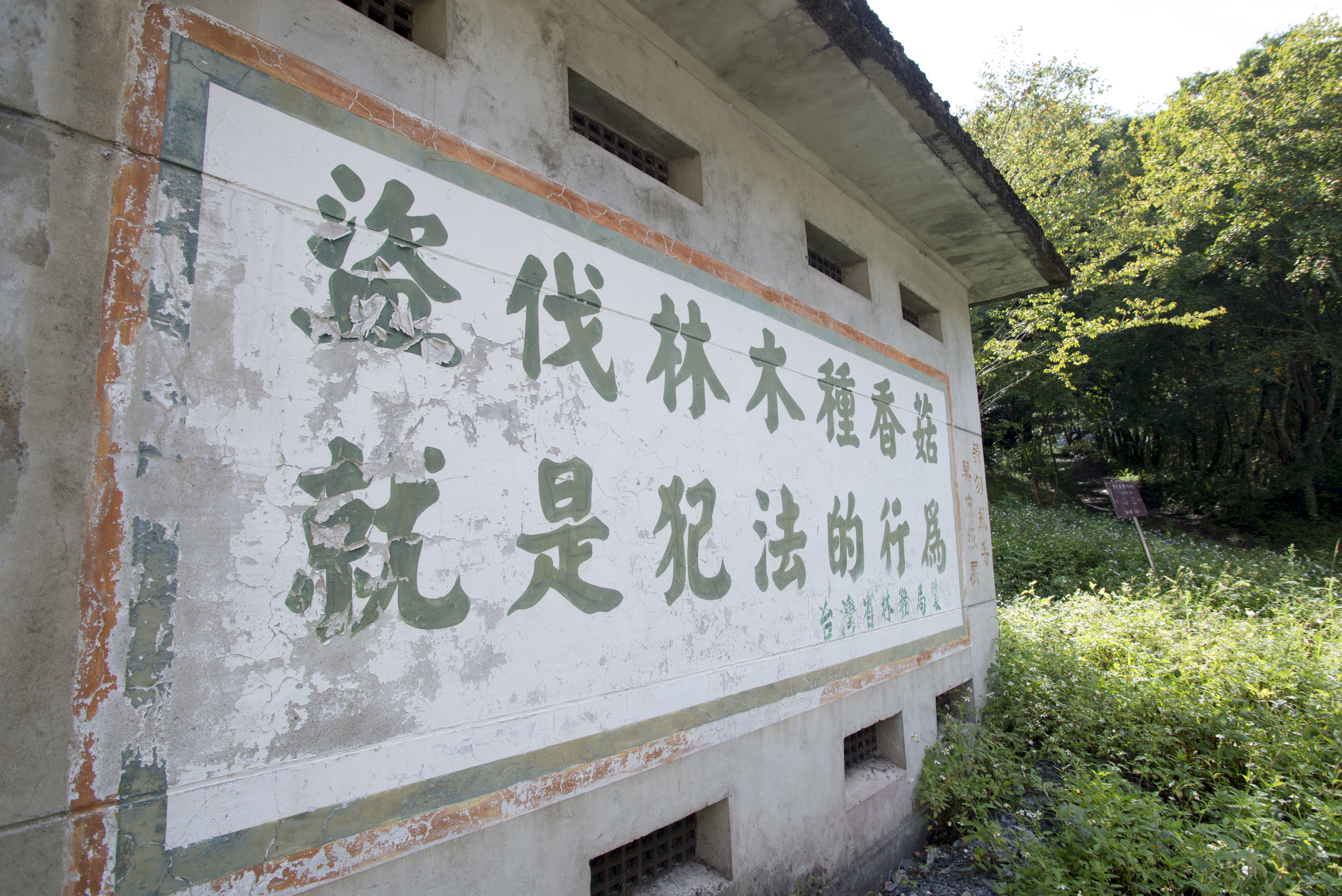
A Taiwanese slogan. Taiwan is known for its slogans, which sometimes teach morality; this is depicted in the film in the character of Wen.

Wen's attachment to the slogan "Seize your day, decide your path" illustrates a Taiwanese phenomenon that originated in the 1960s. In the film, like some Taiwanese people, Wen considers it his moral principle despite not really living by it. His decision to murder Radish, however, seems to him to be a vindication of his slogan. Patrick Brzeksi of The Hollywood Reporter considered the film's moral as: "Life ... is too complicated to live under the harsh light of moral purity." Moral ambiguity is seen in the film's last scene, in which Ho steals a bike and Qin (despite some reservations) decides to go along. According to Chung, certain morals can be violated as long as no one is hurt.

Socioeconomic inequality in Taiwan is explored in A Sun. Wen's motto does not reflect his life; Ho works at a car wash after his release from prison, and Radish becomes a gangster against a backdrop of poverty. Brian Hioe wrote that the film's treatment of the subject is lighter than The Great Buddha+ and The Bold, the Corrupt, and the Beautiful (2017). A Sun criticizes the Taiwanese judicial system, in which Ho's prison offers no education. Radish injures Oden but Wen, ironically, is expected to pay his hospital bill; the film stresses social support systems and the awareness of responsibilities.

Chung called A Sun a humanist film. Brian Hioe of the No Man is an Island website wrote that the film's crime drama genre became common in Taiwanese cinema after the 2014 Taipei Metro attack, whose chronology is similar to the opening scene of A Sun. Filmmaker Ang Lee found a Buddhist spirituality in the film; each character's destiny seems to be determined by their actions, a common theme in Asian cinema. A Sun's existentialism is exemplified by shots of lonely characters against wide, scenic backgrounds. Radish dyes his hair orange when he is released, suggesting evil and resentment.

== Release ==
A Sun had its world premiere at the Toronto International Film Festival on 6 September 2019, before the film's Asian premiere at the 2019 Hong Kong Asian Film Festival on 3 October. It was then screened at the 24th Busan International Film Festival four days later. Successive festivals included the Tokyo International Film Festival and the 56th Taiwanese Golden Horse Film Festival on 13 October. The 2019 Singapore International Film Festival screened the film on 25 and 27 November. Its American premiere was at the Palm Springs International Film Festival on 6 January 2020. The film's Taiwanese theatrical run began on 1 November 2019, and ended on 1 December. Applause Entertainment, its distributor, released three trailers; one was a teaser montage without dialogue, and another was a shorter version of the first.

=== Netflix ===
Since the 1980s, Taiwanese films haven't received a lot of international attention. Many recent directors perhaps were not as creative or artistic as Edward Yang or Hou Hsiao-hsien. A lot of the films emerging from Taiwan today aren’t much like the New Taiwanese Cinema. [...] A Sun was distributed to the whole world because of Netflix. It happens naturally in this changing world. I didn't necessarily expect that the film would receive more attention on Netflix; I only thought it would be available to more people globally.

— Chung, on the film's poor marketing by Netflix

Netflix acquired the rights to A Sun in late 2019, and released it as a Netflix original film on 24 January 2020. Poor marketing cost the film the expected amount of critical and general coverage; David Ehrlich of IndieWire wrote that it was "buried" in the Netflix catalog. Another IndieWire writer, Tom Brueggemann, cited an overload of new titles on the platform, causing a failure to market them. When it became Taiwan's Academy Award for Best International Feature Film entry at the 93rd Academy Awards, Netflix released two trailers on YouTube; one was unlisted so only people with access to the link could view it, however, and the other was distributed by the Taiwan Creative Content Agency.

The film later received some attention with the help of American critic Peter Debruge, who published a Variety listicle calling it the best film of 2020; a niche following was soon seen. Chung said that he did not expect the film to boom in popularity with the Netflix acquisition, but for it to be accessible globally. He called this crucial due to fading access to Taiwanese cinema since the 1980s. Chung was happy with Deburge's article, calling it "an encouragement for Taiwanese filmmakers, and even for Taiwan herself"; since the popular Hou Hsiao-hsien and Edward Yang films, Taiwanese cinema was rarely discussed due to the changing nature of the industry (particularly in Taiwan). Major publications, such as The New York Times and The Guardian, did not review the film.

== Reception ==
=== Box office ===
According to data from the Taiwan Film Institute between 4 and 10 November (its approximate opening week), A Sun played in 44 theaters in Taiwan; it grossed NT$4,550,861, with 19,172 tickets sold. The revenue was a 38.11% increase from its 1–3 November. Over the next six days, two theaters stopped screening the film; it grossed $3,258,810 with 13,686 tickets sold, a 28.61% decrease. It earned $14,157,606 with 59,687 tickets sold the following week, a 5.40% drop. Eight theaters added the film in its final week for a 122.79% increase in earnings: $6,806,407, with 28,844 tickets sold. A Sun grossed a total of $20,964,013 with 88,531 tickets sold, a box-office bomb.

Chung's previous films had also been unsuccessful. He said that the average Taiwanese filmgoer was not fond of his films, although his wife encouraged him to make films for their own sake and not for the box office. Chung said that his films were for a niche group whose appreciation was more than enough, and he wanted to make films until he loses interest. Wang Zu-peng of The News Lens opined that audiences should give Chung "less alienation and more affection", allowing his poetry film to envelop them.

=== Critical response ===
Review aggregator Rotten Tomatoes marked A Sun as generally well-received, with a 94% approval rating based on 18 critics; many called it one of the best films of 2019–2020 as well as a masterpiece of Taiwanese cinema. Writing for Sight & Sound, Tony Rayns called it "the most impressive film of recent times"; Debruge called it "a world-cinema stunner" built on mastery.

A number of critics enjoyed the film's treatment of its themes. The good and the evil are balanced; subgenres including crime, drama, and comedy coalesced smoothly, allowing for good pacing and a compelling narrative. According to David Ehrlich of IndieWire, this made A Sun "a riveting moral odyssey". The plot also praised for its organic flow and rich nuance, with A-Hao's suicide scene compared to the films of Lee Chang-dong. Critics noted that the violent opening scene, reminiscent of the films of Quentin Tarantino, was a preface to the film's spectrum of emotions. Its natural motifs and emotional ambiguity were also praised. Chung's style was compared to Edward Yang, Ang Lee, Hirokazu Kore-eda, Barry Jenkins and Lulu Wang; the film was compared to Yang's A Brighter Summer Day (1991) and Yi Yi (2000), and some critics said that A Sun makes Chung a possible member of New Taiwanese Cinema. His camera framing, which attempted to disconnect the characters from their environment, was compared to the films of Michael Haneke. The cinematography's use of natural light was also praised, though Han Cheung of the Taipei Times lamented the runtime as a bit too short.

A Sun's cast was praised for their performances, which increased the film's emotional weight. Pramit Chatterjee of Mashable praised Wu and Hsu's performances. Chen's performance deepened his short-tempered character, conveying his ambivalent personality. Liu's performance gave Radish a distinct menace. Ko added a kind strength to Qin, with Kevin L. Lee of Film Inquirer comparing her performance as a mother to Regina King's in If Beale Street Could Talk (2018), and Cheung opining that with Chen, they intensify the film's "suffocating tension". The female cast were praised for their uniqueness. The supporting cast were praised equally with the starring ensemble, with Liu successfully portraying the manipulative Radish. Cheung lamented some of the female characters' insignificant arcs, noting that the film mostly explore men, though said it is none more than nitpicking.

=== Accolades ===
List of accolades received by A Sun
Year	Award ceremony	Category	Recipient	Result	Ref.
2019	56th Golden Horse Awards	Best Feature Film	A Sun	Won	
2019	56th Golden Horse Awards	Best Director	Chung Mong-hong	Won	
2019	56th Golden Horse Awards	Best Leading Actor	Wu Chien-ho	Nominated	
2019	56th Golden Horse Awards	Best Leading Actor	Chen Yi-wen	Won	
2019	56th Golden Horse Awards	Best Leading Actress	Samantha Ko	Nominated	
2019	56th Golden Horse Awards	Best Supporting Actor	Liu Kuan-ting	Won	
2019	56th Golden Horse Awards	Best Supporting Actress	Wen Chen-ling	Nominated	
2019	56th Golden Horse Awards	Best Original Screenplay	Chung Mong-hong; Chang Yao-sheng	Nominated	
2019	56th Golden Horse Awards	Best Cinematography	Nagao Nakashima	Nominated	
2019	56th Golden Horse Awards	Best Original Film Song	"Distant Journey"	Nominated	
2019	56th Golden Horse Awards	Best Film Editing	Lai Hsiu-hsiung	Won	
2019	56th Golden Horse Awards	Audience Choice Award	A Sun	Won	
2020	14th Asian Film Awards	Best Film	A Sun	Nominated	
2020	14th Asian Film Awards	Best Director	Chung Mong-hong	Nominated	
2020	14th Asian Film Awards	Best Actor	Chen Yi-wen	Nominated	
2020	14th Asian Film Awards	Best Supporting Actor	Liu Kuan-ting	Nominated	
2020	14th Asian Film Awards	Best Supporting Actress	Samantha Ko	Won	
2020	14th Asian Film Awards	Best Screenplay	Chung Mong-hong; Chang Yao-sheng	Nominated	
2020	14th Asian Film Awards	Best Editing	Lai Hsiu-hsiung	Nominated	
2021	Houston Film Critics Society Awards 2020	Best Foreign Language Film	A Sun	Won	
2021	25th Satellite Awards	Best Foreign Language Film	A Sun	Nominated	
2021	93rd Academy Awards	Best International Feature Film	A Sun	Shortlisted	
