= Chen Yi-wen =

Taiwanese filmmaker and actor (born 1966)

- 陳以文
- Born: Taiwan
- Occupations: Director; producer; screenwriter; playwright; actor

Chen Yi-wen (Chinese: 陳以文; born 1966) is a Taiwanese filmmaker and actor.

== Career ==
While Taiwanese directors are often associated with slower-paced, personal art films, Chen decided early on when he entered the film industry that he wanted to produce high quality, entertainment-oriented movies.

"The performing arts shouldn’t be inhibited by theory." This motto has become the foundation of Chen's career, which includes screenwriting, directing, as well as theatre, instilling his films with a style that critics view as unique and distinguished.

Chen's first short film, Scenes of Violence, cost NT$3,000 to produce and earned NT$600,000 in returns from television sales in Taiwan and Japan. This success gave him the confidence to devote himself to the film industry. Chen was even interviewed by Wealth Magazine for an in-depth report on the success of his short film for its high ROI (return on investment).

In 1998, a Japanese corporation invested in Chen's first feature film JAM. The film set a record of continuously running for over three months in theatres.

After the success of JAM, Chen completed a gangster film, A Chance to Die, once again getting financing from Japan. He asked Miki Mizuno, a well-known Japanese actress, and Takashi Kashiwabara, a famous Japanese idol who is also popular in Taiwan, to play the main characters. This was his second feature film.

For his third feature, The Cabbie, Chen secured acclaimed Japanese actress Rie Miyazawa for the lead. The film was widely praised as a fresh, inventive contribution to Taiwanese comedy.

Chen has continued to search for new and innovative storytelling methods. He returned from a short-term sabbatical in New York, with a renewed focus on producing high quality films.

In 2006, Chen finished a 35mm feature film, Tripping, also known as Time Tripper, which combined the road movie with a martial arts film. In 2013, he produced and directed As the Winds Blow.

After 2015, Chen worked as an actor in many feature films, Godspeed, The Great Buddha+, Xiao Mei, High Flash, A Sun, The Falls ... and so on, and he also acted on Netflix programs, Wake Up 2, On Children, and Monstrous Me.

In 2019, Chen got the Best Leading Actor Award by the feature film A Sun in the 56th Golden Horse Awards and he also got the nominee of the Best Leading Actors by a short film A Taxi Driver in the 54th Golden Bell Awards.

The Best Actor Award (Short Film) went to Yi-Wen by a short film Growing Pains in the 40th Hawaii International Film Festival in 2020.

== Filmography ==
=== Worked as an actor in feature films ===
Year	Title	Role	Director
1989	The Man from Island West	Ah-Jian (aka Ah-Chuan)	Ming-Chuan Huang
1991	A Brighter Summer Day	Horse Cart	Edward Yang
1994	A Confucian Confusion	Liren	Edward Yang
1996	Mahjong	Taxi driver	Edward Yang
1998	Jam	Restaurant owner Liu	Chen Yi-wen (aka Yi-Wen Chen)
2000	Yi Yi	Apartment guard	Edward Yang
2011	Formosa Mambo	Toro	Chi-Tsai Wang
2013	How to Describe a Cloud	Ophthalmologist	David Verbeek
2014	Paradise in Service	Colonel Yu	Doze Niu
2015	Keelung	Zi-Long Zhao	Liang Qiao
2016	Godspeed	Ah-Wen	Chung Mong-Hong
2017	The Great Buddha+	Congressman Gao	Hsin-Yao Huang
2018	Xiao Mei	Landlord	Maren Hwang
2018	The Blue Choker	Dorm Master	Hsun-Wei David Chang
2018	High Flash	Lin-Kun Wei	Ching-Shen Chuang
2019	Looking for Kafka	Big Cock	Jade Y. Chen
2019	A Sun	Ah-Wen	Chung Mong-Hong
2020	Someone Who Was Lost	Tai's Father	Chi-Wai Cheong, Jhih-Yun Lin
2020	Classmates Minus	Congressman Gao	Hsin-Yao Huang
2020	A Leg	Senior Policeman	Yao-Sheng Chang
2021	Plurality	Chi-Hwei Liao	Aozaru Shiao
2021	Treat or Trick	Hsu	Fu-Hsuang Hsu
2021	The Falls	Mr. Chen	Chung Mong-Hong
2021	Increasing Echo	Fu-Sheng Yen	Hsiang Chienn
2021	Leave Me Along	Chao	Yang-Chung Fan
2022	Summer	Yen Lui	Che-Hsien Su
2022	Funeral	Chuan-Tsai Li	Dan-Quei Shen
2023	The Pig, The Snake and The Pigeon	Lu-ho Lin	Ching-Po Wong
2024	The Embers	Officer CHEN	Chung Mong-Hong
2025	A Foggy Tale	Intelligence Chief FAN Chuen	Yu-Hsun Chen
2026	Double Happiness	Chairman Shie	Joseph Chen-Chieh Hsu
2026	Tristes Tropiques		Park Hoon-jung
2026	Cold War 1994	Ma Teng Fong	Longman Leung

=== Worked as a director ===
==== Feature films directed ====
- 1994 A Confucian Confusion（Assistant Director）
- 1998 Jam（Screenwriter, concurrently）
- 2000 A Chance to Die（Screenwriter & Costume Designer, concurrently）
- 2000 The Cabbie
- 2006 Tripping (aka: Time Tripper, aka: Gen Yu Den)（Screenwriter, concurrently）
- 2009 File No. 1689（Screenwriter & Producer, concurrently）
- 2013 As the Winds Blow（Screenwriter & Producer, concurrently）

==== Short films directed ====
- 1994 Scenes of Violence（Screenwriter, concurrently）
- 1995 Lessons（Screenwriter, concurrently）

== Awards and nominations for actor or director ==
Year	Awards ceremony	Category	Film Title	Role (for actor)	Result
1994	Taipei Film Awards	Top Award (Non-commercial)	Scenes of Violence		Won
1995	4th Yamagata International Documentary Film Festival	Awards for Excellence (New Asian Currents)	Scenes of Violence		Won
1995	18th Golden Harvest	Awards for Excellence	Lessons		Won
1998	Vancouver International Film Festival	Jury Special Mentions	Jam		Won
2000	37th Golden Horse Awards	Grand Jury Award	The Cabbie		Won
2000	3rd Taipei Film Festival	Grand Jury Award	The Cabbie		Won
2000	3rd Taipei Film Festival	Best Director Award	The Cabbie		Won
2001	3rd Deauville Asian Film Festival	Best Director (Golden Lotus) Award	The Cabbie		Won
2019	6th Taoyuan Film Festival	Jury Special Mentions	A Taxi Driver	Ro-Chang Tsuei	Won
2019	54th Golden Bell Awards	Best Actor (Mini Series or TV Films)	A Taxi Driver	Ro-Chang Tsuei	Nominated
2019	56th Golden Horse Awards	Best Leading Actor	A Sun	Wen	Won
2019	Taiwan Film Critics Society Awards	Best Actor	A Sun	Wen	Won
2020	11th Youth Film Manual Annual Ceremony	Best Actors of Annual Recommendations in 2019	A Sun	Wen	Won
2020	14th Asian Film Awards	Best Actor	A Sun	Wen	Nominated
2020	40th Hawaii International Film Festival	Best Actor (Short films)	Growing Pains	Ren-Hsiung Huang	Won
2022	24th Taipei Film Festival	Best Leading Actor	Increasing Echo	Fu-Sheng Yen	Nominated
2026	1st Taiwan Pop Movie Awards	Villain Role of the Year	A Foggy Tale	Intelligence Chief FAN Chuen	Won
