= 14th Asian Film Awards =

2020 edition of award ceremony

- Date: October 28, 2020
- Site: Online

Highlights
- Best Film: Parasite
- Most awards: Parasite (4)
- Most nominations: Parasite (10)

Television coverage
- Network: YouTube

The 14th Asian Film Awards was the 2020 edition of the Asian Film Awards. Given the COVID-19 pandemic, the ceremony was held online.

== Winners and Nominees ==
Winners:

Best Film	Best Director
Parasite (South Korea); Listen to the Universe (Japan); So Long, My Son (China); A Sun (Taiwan); Thappad (India); There Is No Evil (Iran)	Wang Xiaoshuai – So Long, My Son (China); Pema Tseden – Balloon (China); Tsai Ming-liang – Days (Taiwan); Bong Joon-ho – Parasite (South Korea); Chung Mong-hong – A Sun (Taiwan); Nobuhiro Suwa – Voices in the Wind (Japan)
Best Actor	Best Actress
Lee Byung-hun – The Man Standing Next (South Korea); Hamed Behdad – Castle of Dreams (Iran); Chen Yi-wen – A Sun (Taiwan); Masataka Kubota – First Love (Japan); Tai Bo – Suk Suk (Hong Kong); Wang Jingchun – So Long, My Son (China)	Zhou Dongyu – Better Days (China) / (Hong Kong); Chutimon Chuengcharoensukying – Happy Old Year (Thailand); Jung Yu-mi – Kim Ji-young: Born 1982 (South Korea); Mariko Tsutsui – A Girl Missing (Japan); Yeo Yann Yann – Wet Season (Singapore); Yong Mei – So Long, My Son (China)
Best Supporting Actor	Best Supporting Actress
Ryo Kase – To the Ends of the Earth (Japan) / (Uzbekistan) / (Qatar); Choi Woo-shik – Parasite (South Korea); Jinpa – Balloon (China); Liu Kuan-ting – A Sun (Taiwan); Ben Yuen – Suk Suk (Hong Kong)	Ko Shu-chin – A Sun (Taiwan); Patra Au – Suk Suk (Hong Kong); Lee Jung-eun – Parasite (South Korea); Yūko Tanaka – One Night (Japan); Zhou Ye – Better Days (China) / (Hong Kong)
Best New Director	Best Newcomer
Hikari – 37 Seconds (Japan); John Hsu – Detention (Taiwan); Lee Sang-geun – Exit (South Korea); Sharipa Urazbayeva – Mariam (Kazakhstan) / (Germany); Norris Wong – My Prince Edward (Hong Kong); Liang Ming – Wisdom Tooth (China)	Jackson Yee – Better Days (Hong Kong) / (China); Fandy Fan – We Are Champions (Taiwan); Anong Houngheuangsy – Days (Taiwan); Kim Hye-jun – Another Child (South Korea); Sakurako Konishi – First Love (Japan)
Best Screenplay	Best Editing
Bong Joon-ho, Han Jin-won – Parasite (South Korea); Pema Tseden – Balloon (China); Mohammad Davoudi, Mohsen Gharaie – Castle of Dreams (Iran); Wang Xiaoshuai, A Mei – So Long, My Son (China); Chung Mong-hong, Chang Yao-sheng – A Sun (Taiwan)	Yang Jin-mo – Parasite (South Korea); Zhang Yibo – Better Days (Hong Kong) / (China); Lee Chatametikool – So Long, My Son (China); Lai Hsiu-hsiung – A Sun (Taiwan); Yasha Ramchandani – Thappad (India)
Best Cinematography	Best Original Music
Dong Jinsong – The Wild Goose Lake (China) / (France); Lǚ Songye – Balloon (China); Girish Gangadharan – Jallikattu (India); Lim Won-geun – Time to Hunt (South Korea); Akiko Ashizawa – To the Ends of the Earth (Japan) / (Uzbekistan) / (Qatar)	Karsh Kale, The Salvage Audio Collective – Gully Boy (India); Prashant Pillai – Jallikattu (India); Tomohiko Banse, Grandfunk, Wataru Sawabe – On-Gaku: Our Sound (Japan); Jung Jae-il – Parasite (South Korea); Kim Tae-seong– Svaha: The Sixth Finger (South Korea)
Best Costume Designer	Best Production Design
Pacharin Surawatanapongs– Happy Old Year (Thailand); Dora Ng – Better Days (Hong Kong) / (China); Sang-gyeong Jo – Forbidden Dream (South Korea); Arjun Bhasin, Poornamrita Singh – Gully Boy (India); Masae Miyamoto – Kingdom (Japan)	Ha-jun Lee – Parasite (South Korea); Suzanne Caplan Merwanji – Gully Boy (India); Wenceslaus de Rozari – Gundala (Indonesia); Dong Lv – So Long, My Son (China); Ang Gao – The Wandering Earth (China)
Best Visual Effects	Best Sound
Tomi Kijo, Renovatio Pictures – Detention (Taiwan); Jong-hyun Jin – Ashfall (South Korea); Kaori Ootagaki – First Love (Japan); Jeong-ho Hong – Parasite (South Korea); Yanlai Ding – The Wandering Earth (China)	Yoshifumi Kureishi – Listen to the Universe (Japan); Tae-young Choi – Ashfall (South Korea); Tae-young Choi – Parasite (South Korea); Danrong Wang – The Wandering Earth (China); Yang Zhang – The Wild Goose Lake (China) / (France)

== Presenters ==
- Anthony Chen – presented Best New Director and Best Cinematography
- Nawapol Thamrongrattanarit – presented Best Production Design and Best Visual Effects
- Johnny Huang Jingyu – presented Best Costume Design and Best Newcomer
- Yang Ik-june – presented Best Original Music and Best Supporting Actor
- Samal Yeslyamova – presented Best Sound and Best Actress
- Koreeda Hirokazu – presented Best Editing and Best Film
- Lee Chang-dong – presented Best Screenplay and Best Director
- Kara Wai – presented Best Supporting Actress
- Yakusho Koji – presented Best Actor
