= Shuangxi =

Shuangxi may refer to:

- Double Happiness (calligraphy) (双喜), a Chinese calligraphic design

== Mainland China ==
All terms contain "双溪":

Towns

- Shuangxi, Ningde, in Pingnan County, Fujian
- Shuangxi, Jing'an County, Jiangxi
- Shuangxi, Hongjiang, Hunan
- Shuangxi, Shaanxi, in Chenggu County

Townships

- Shuangxi Township, Guzhang County, Hunan
- Shuangxi Township, Linwu County, Hunan
- Shuangxi Township, Jiangxi, in Shangyou County
- Shuangxi Township, Dazhu County, Sichuan
- Shuangxi Township, Hanyuan County, Sichuan
- Shuangxi Township, Qianwei County, Sichuan
- Shuangxi Township, Shehong County, Sichuan
- Shuangxi Township, Nanchong, in Yingshan County, Sichuan
- Shuangxi Township, Zhejiang, in Pan'an County

Subdistricts

- Shuangxi Subdistrict, Shunchang County, Fujian

== Taiwan ==
- Shuangxi District (雙溪區), New Taipei, Taiwan
- Shuangsi Tropical Viviparous Forest

== See also ==
- Double Happiness (disambiguation)
