= Yi Ming =

Taiwanese actor

Yi Ming (Chinese: 儀銘; 5 September 1931 – 2 June 2009) was a Taiwanese actor.

Yi Ming was born Tien Chih-wu (田致斌). He received the Golden Horse Award for Best Supporting Actor in 1970 and 1975, and won the Golden Bell Award for Best Actor in 1983. Yi Ming died of diabetes complications, aged 77, on 2 June 2009.
