= My Missing Valentine =

- Theatrical release poster
- Traditional Chinese: 消失的情人節
- Simplified Chinese: 消失的情人节
- Hanyu Pinyin: Xiāoshī de qíngrén jié
- Directed by: Chen Yu-hsun
- Written by: Chen Yu-hsun
- Produced by: Lieh Lee; Yeh Ju-feng
- Starring: Liu Kuan-ting; Patty Lee
- Cinematography: Patrick Chou
- Edited by: Lai Hsiu-hsiung
- Music by: Luming Lu
- Production companies: 1 Production Film; Ambassandor Theatres; Mandarin Vision; Ocean Deep Films
- Distributed by: Warner Bros. Pictures
- Release date: 18 September 2020 (Taiwan)
- Running time: 119 minutes
- Country: Taiwan
- Language: Mandarin
- Budget: NT$40,000,000
- Box office: NT$32,120,000

My Missing Valentine (Chinese: 消失的情人節) is a 2020 Taiwanese romantic comedy film written and directed by Chen Yu-hsun, and starring Liu Kuan-ting, Patty Lee. The film was released in Taiwan on September 18, 2020, and it was selected for Open Cinema of the 25th Busan International Film Festival on October 29. It received 11 nominations at the 57th Golden Horse Awards, winning Best Feature Film, Best Original Screenplay, Best Visual Effects, Best Film Editing and Best Director for Chen.

== Synopsis ==
A girl who does things so quickly that she's always one step ahead of others discovers that her Valentine's Day has mysteriously passed when she wakes up the next morning.

== Cast ==
- Liu Kuan-ting as A Tai, a bus driver
- Patty Lee as Yang Hsiao-chi, a post officer
- Duncan Chow as Liu Wen-sen, a dance teacher
- Joanne Missingham as Ye Pei-wen, a post officer
- Ayugo Huang as Yang Hsiao-chi's father
- Heaven Hai as Scam victim

== Awards and nominations ==
Award	Category	Recipients	Result	Notes
57th Golden Horse Awards	Best Feature Film	My Missing Valentine	Won	
57th Golden Horse Awards	Best Original Screenplay	Chen Yu Hsun	Won	
57th Golden Horse Awards	Best Director	Chen Yu Hsun	Won	
57th Golden Horse Awards	Best Leading Actor	Liu Kuan-ting	Nominated	
57th Golden Horse Awards	Best Leading Actress	Patty Lee	Nominated	
57th Golden Horse Awards	Best Cinematography	Chou Yi-hsien	Nominated	
57th Golden Horse Awards	Best Visual Effects	Tomi Kuo	Won	
57th Golden Horse Awards	Best Art Direction	Wang Chih-cheng	Nominated	
57th Golden Horse Awards	Best Sound Effects	Book Chien, Tang Shiang-chu	Nominated	
57th Golden Horse Awards	Best Original Film Song	"Lost and Found"	Nominated	
23rd Far East Film Festival	Crystal Mulberry Award (Gelso di Cristallo)	My Missing Valentine	Won	
23rd Far East Film Festival	Black Dragon Award	My Missing Valentine	Won	
40th Hong Kong Film Awards	Best Film from Mainland and Taiwan	My Missing Valentine	Nominated	

== Remake ==
My Missing Valentine was remade in Japan as One Second Ahead, One Second Behind in 2023, with the genders of the protagonists reversed. It was adapted by Kankurō Kudō and directed by Nobuhiro Yamashita.
