= Liu Kuan-ting =

Taiwanese actor

- 劉冠廷
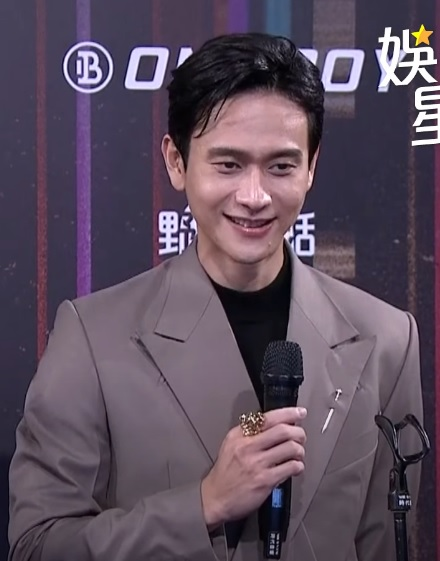
- Liu in 2022
- Born: November 11, 1988 (age 37); Pingtung County, Taiwan
- Other name: Liu Guanting
- Education: National Taiwan University of Arts
- Occupation: Actor
- Years active: 2016–present
- Spouse: Sun Ke-fang (m. 2023)

Chinese name
- Traditional Chinese: 劉冠廷
- Simplified Chinese: 刘冠廷
- Hanyu Pinyin: Liú Guāntíng
- Hokkien POJ: Lâu Koan-têng

Liu Kuan-ting (Chinese: 劉冠廷; Pe̍h-ōe-jī: Lâu Koan-têng; born November 11, 1988) is a Taiwanese actor. He received the Golden Bell Award for Best Supporting Actor for the hit drama series A Boy Named Flora A (2017). In 2019, he won Best Supporting Actor at the 56th Golden Horse Awards for the film A Sun.

He participated in the HBO Asia TV series Trinity of Shadows which comprises 15 one-hour episodes, as a rookie policeman. It premiered on June 13, 2021 and played on HBO Go and HBO in Asia.

== Selected filmography ==
=== Television series ===
Year	English title	Original title	Role	Notes
2016	Q Series: Love of Sandstorm	植劇場－戀愛沙塵暴	Liu Tsung-han	
2016	Life Plan A and B	植劇場－荼蘼	You-yen's senior	Special appearance
2016	Rock Records in Love	滾石愛情故事－祝我幸福	Hsiao Wen-tao	Episode: "Wishing Me Happy"
2016	Have You Ever Fallen in Love, Miss Jiang?	植劇場－姜老師，妳談過戀愛嗎？	Chen Chi-ming	
2016	House of Toy Bricks	植劇場－積木之家	Chen	
2017	A Boy Named Flora A	植劇場－花甲男孩轉大人	Cheng Hua-ming	
2017	What She Put on the Table	植劇場－五味八珍的歲月	Rogue	
2019	All Is Well	你那邊怎樣·我這邊OK	Luo Ting-hsuan	
2020	Palace of Serendipity	故事宮寓	Shang Dynasty Jade Ornaments (Stage: Jadeware that travels through time and space)	
2021	Tears on Fire	火神的眼淚	Lin Yi Yang / Ling Yang	
2021	Trinity of Shadows	第三佈局 塵沙惑	Chen Jiahao	
2021	Brave Animated series	勇者動畫系列	First Brave	Episode: "We're the same..."
2022	No Regrets In Life	愛情發生在三天後	Wang Yen	
2022	On Marriage	你的婚姻不是你的婚姻-聖筊	Chen Pao-ting	Episode: Wishful Syncing
2024	Not a Murder Story	茁劇場—非殺人小說	Chang Tse-tung	
2024	Born for the Sportlight	影后	Actor	Special appearance
2025	Brave Animated Series 2	勇者動畫系列	Sorry Brave	
2026	Driving Mom Crazy	新手路上		

=== Film ===
Year	English title	Original title	Role	Notes
2017	The Last Painting	自畫像	Police officer	Special appearance
2018	Back to the Good Times	花甲大人轉男孩	Cheng Hua-ming	
2018	Xiao Mei	小美	The boyfriend	
2019	It's a Mad, Mad, Mad, Mad Show	瘋狂電視台瘋電影	A-bi	
2019	Sent From Above	喜從天降	Chen	
2019	A Sun	陽光普照	Radish (Tsai Tou)	
2020	Acting Out Of Love	練愛iNG		Special appearance
2020	A choo	打噴嚏		Special appearance
2020	My Missing Valentine	消失的情人節	A-tai	
2020	The Silent Forest	無聲	Wang Ta-Chun	
2020	Classmates Minus	同學麥娜絲	Lee Hung-Chang	
2020	A Leg	腿	William	Special appearance
2021	The Falls	瀑布	Firefighter	Cameo
2023	Marry My Dead Body	關於我和鬼變成家人的那件事	Police	Special appearance
2023	Old Fox	老狐狸	Liao Tai-Lai	
2023	Trouble Girl	小曉	Taxi Driver	Special appearance
2024	Tales of Taipei	愛情城事-我是一隻蛇	Mr. Hsu	
2024	Pigsy	八戒	Sanzang	Voice
2024	The Embers	餘燼	Tsai	
2025	Behind the Shadows	私家偵探	Chen Kang-wen	
2025	A Foggy Tale	大濛	Ko Kim-tsiong (Kao Chin-chung)	
2026	Double Happiness	雙囍	Kao Ting-sheng	
2026	Kung Fu	功夫		
2026	April	丟包阿公到我家		
2026	The Canary's Lullaby	我親愛的怪孩子		

=== Music video appearances ===
Year	Artist	Song title
2013	JJ Lin	"Future Tense"

== Awards and nominations ==
Year	Award	Category	Nominated work	Result
2018	53rd Golden Bell Awards	Best Supporting Actor in a Television Series	A Boy Named Flora A	Won
2019	56th Golden Horse Awards	Best Supporting Actor	A Sun	Won
2020	14th Asian Film Awards	Best Supporting Actor	A Sun	Nominated
2020	57th Golden Horse Awards	Best Leading Actor	My Missing Valentine	Nominated
2021	2nd Taiwan Film Critics Society Awards	Best Actor	My Missing Valentine	Nominated
2021	2nd Taiwan Film Critics Society Awards	Best Actor	Classmates Minus	Nominated
2021	23rd Taipei Film Awards	Best Supporting Actor	Classmates Minus	Nominated
2021	23rd Taipei Film Awards	Best Supporting Actor	Treat or Trick	Won
2021	58th Golden Horse Awards	Best Supporting Actor	Treat or Trick	Won
2022	57th Golden Bell Awards	Best Supporting Actor in a Television Series	Tears on Fire	Nominated
2023	58th Golden Bell Awards	Best Leading Actor in a Miniseries or Television Film	On Marriage: Wishful Syncing	Nominated
