= 57th Golden Horse Awards =

2020 Taiwanese film awards ceremony

- Taipei Golden Horse Film Festival and Awards 2020 poster
- Date: November 21, 2020
- Site: Sun Yat-sen Memorial Hall, Taipei, Taiwan
- Organized by: Taipei Golden Horse Film Festival Executive Committee

Highlights
- Best Feature Film: My Missing Valentine
- Best Director: Chen Yu-hsun; My Missing Valentine
- Best Actor: Mo Tzu-yi; Dear Tenant
- Best Actress: Chen Shu-fang; Little Big Women
- Most awards: My Missing Valentine (5)
- Most nominations: My Missing Valentine (11)

Television in Taiwan
- Network: TTV

The 57th Golden Horse Awards (Chinese: 第57屆金馬獎) was held on November 21, 2020 at the Sun Yat-sen Memorial Hall in Taipei, Taiwan. Organized by the Taipei Golden Horse Film Festival Executive Committee, the awards honored the best in Chinese-language films of 2019 and 2020. The ceremony was televised by TTV.

== In the news ==
Taipei Golden Horse Film Festival Executive Committee chief executive Wen Tien-hsiang attributed the lower number of films submitted to the 57th Golden Horse Awards to fewer submissions of short films, not primarily to a boycott announced by the government of the People's Republic of China in August 2019.

== Winners and nominees ==
Best Feature Film: My Missing Valentine; Days; Classmates Minus; Dear Tenant; Hand Rolled Cigarette	Best Documentary: Lost Course; Father; Me and My Condemned Son; Chen Uen; Taking Back the Legislature
Best Animation Feature: City of Lost Things; Dr. Sun
Best Animation Feature: City of Lost Things; Dr. Sun	Best Live Action Short Film: Night Is Young; Temple of Devilbuster; See You, Sir; In This Land We're Briefly Ghosts; Sisters' Busy Hands
Best Animated Short Film: Night Bus; The Six; Grand Adventure Railroad; Little Hilly; The Weather Is Lovely	Best Director: Chen Yu Hsun — My Missing Valentine; Tsai Ming-liang — Days; Huang Hsin-yao — Classmates Minus; Cheng Yu-Chieh — Dear Tenant; Fruit Chan — The Abortionist
Best Leading Actor: Mo Tzu-yi — Dear Tenant; Mark Lee — Number 1; Liu Kuan-ting — My Missing Valentine; Austin Lin — I WeirDo; Gordon Lam — Hand Rolled Cigarette	Best Leading Actress: Chen Shu-fang — Little Big Women; Gwei Lun-mei — A Leg; Patty Lee — My Missing Valentine; Nikki Hsieh — I WeirDo; Bai Ling — The Abortionist
Best Supporting Actor: Nadow Lin — Classmates Minus; Cheng Jen-shuo — Classmates Minus; Michael Chang Shao-huai — A Leg; Leon Dai — Your Name Engraved Herein; Kim Hyunbin — The Silent Forest	Best Supporting Actress: Chen Shu-fang — Dear Tenant; Francesca Kao — Get the Hell Out; Chang Ya-ling — Mickey on the Road; Hsieh Ying-xuan — Little Big Women; Vera Chen — The Rope Curse 2
Best New Director: Chong Keat-aun — The Story of Southern Islet; Liao Ming-yi — I WeirDo; Joseph Hsu Chen-Chieh — Little Big Women; Ko Chen-Nien — The Silent Forest; Chan Kin-long — Hand Rolled Cigarette	Best New Performer: Buffy Chen — The Silent Forest; Wu Yi-jung — Dear Orange; Terrance Lau — Beyond the Dream; Heyo — The Way We Keep Dancing; Chen Hao-sen — Your Name Engraved Herein
Best Original Screenplay: Chen Yu-hsun — My Missing Valentine; Chong Keat-aun — The Story of Southern Islet; Chung Mong-hong and Chang Yao-sheng — A Leg; Cheng Yu-chieh — Dear Tenant; Ko Chen-nien and Lin Pin-jun — The Silent Forest	Best Adapted Screenplay: Felix Tsang, Kiwi Chow — Beyond the Dream; Huang Hsin-yao — Classmates Minus; Maya Huang, Joseph Hsu Chen-chieh — Little Big Women; Adam Wong Sau-ping — The Way We Keep Dancing
Best Cinematography: Yao Hung-i — Your Name Engraved Herein; Patrick Chou — My Missing Valentine; Wayne Peng — Precious Is the Night; Liao Ming-yi — I WeirDo; Nagao Nakashima — Classmates Minus	Best Visual Effects: Tomi Kuo — My Missing Valentine; Sam Kung, Miao Tien-yu, ArChin Yen — I WeirDo; Aben Lee — Hello! Tapir; Xu Yuan, Huang Min-pin — The Rope Curse 2
Best Art Direction: Chao Shih-hao — Classmates Minus; Wang Chih-cheng — My Missing Valentine; Wu Jhong-syuan — I WeirDo; Lee Tien-chueh, Liu Yi-ru — The Silent Forest; Cheung Siu-hong, Yman Yiu Hon-man — Hand Rolled Cigarette	Best Makeup & Costume Design: Raymond Kuek, Azni Samdin — Number 1; Lim Sau-hoong — Precious Is the Night; Cheung Siu-hong, Dos Santos Chan Chi-ching — Hand Rolled Cigarette; Hsu Li-wen — A Leg; Lore Shih, Kiara Wang — The Rope Curse 2
Best Action Choreography: Teddy Ray Huang, Li Shao-peng — Get the Hell Out; Zhang Peng — A Choo; Shing Mak — The Way We Keep Dancing; Tang Sui-wah — Hand Rolled Cigarette	Best Original Film Score: Fran Chen — Dear Tenant; Ko Ren-chien, Eddie Tsai — Classmates Minus; Blaire Ko — Little Big Women; Chris Hou, Yanis Huang — Your Name Engraved Herein; Luming Lu — The Silent Forest
Best Original Film Song: Your Name Engraved Herein" — Your Name Engraved Herein; Composer：Keon Chia, Tan Boon-wah, Hooi Yuan-teng; Lyrics： Keon Chia, Tan Boon-wah, Hooi Yuan-teng; Performer：Crowd Lu, Edward Chen; "Happy Family" — Babi; Composer： Namewee; Lyrics： Namewee, 5forty2, The Real Masta Clan; Performer： Namewee, 5forty2, The Real Masta Clan; "Lost and Found" — My Missing Valentine; Composer： Luming Lu; Lyrics： Patty Lee, Luming Lu; Performer： Patty Lee; "Guo Mie" — Little Big Women; Composer： Blaire Ko; Lyrics： Elisa Y.H. Lin; Performer： Chen Shu-Fang, Yu Tzu-yu; "Welcome to This City" — The Way We Keep Dancing; Composer： Day Tai, Heyo; Lyrics： Heyo, Afuc, Saville Chan; Performer： Heyo, Afuc, Lydia Lau, Jan Curious, Kida Choir	Best Film Editing: Lai Hsiu-hsiung — My Missing Valentine; Lai Hsiu-hsiung— Classmates Minus; Mary Stephen, Adam Wong Sau-ping — The Way We Keep Dancing; Milk Su, Chen Chun-hung — The Silent Forest; William Chang Suk-ping, Alan Lo — Hand Rolled Cigarette
Best Sound Effects: Kuo Li-chi, Lee Dong-hwan — The Silent Forest; Dennis Tsao, Ho Hsiang-ling, Lin Zi-xiang, Lee Yu-chih, Wang Min-hsu — Days; Tu Duu-chih, Wu Shu-yao — Beyond the Dream; Book Chien, Tang Shiang-chu — My Missing Valentine; Thomas Cheng, Vincent Tam King-wah, Chill Yang — The Way We Keep Dancing	Audience Choice Award: Classmates Minus
FIPRESCI Prize: The Story of Southern Islet	Outstanding Taiwanese Filmmaker of the Year: Peng Ren-meng
Lifetime Achievement Award: Hou Hsiao-hsien
