= A Leg =

- Film poster
- Traditional Chinese: 腿
- Simplified Chinese: 腿
- Hanyu Pinyin: Tuǐ
- Directed by: Chang Yao-sheng
- Written by: Chang Yao-sheng; Chung Mong-hong
- Produced by: Chung Mong-hong
- Starring: Gwei Lun-mei; Tony Yang
- Cinematography: Chung Mong-hong
- Edited by: Lai Hsiu-hsiung
- Music by: Luming Lu
- Production companies: Mirror Fiction; Mandarin Vision; Cream Production
- Distributed by: Golden Village Pictures; Clover Films; Applause Entertainment Limited
- Release dates: 5 November 2020 (Golden Horse Film Festival); 24 December 2020 (Taiwan)
- Running time: 115 minutes
- Country: Taiwan
- Language: Mandarin
- Box office: NT$7,806,810

A Leg (Chinese: 腿) is a 2020 Taiwanese dark romantic comedy drama film co-written and directed by Chang Yao-sheng (in his feature directorial debut), produced and co-written by Chung Mong-hong and starring Gwei Lun-mei and Tony Yang. The film was the opening film at the 2020 Golden Horse Film Festival on November 5, 2020. It screened at several film festivals including Tokyo International Film Festival and Hong Kong Asian Film Festival, and it was officially released in Taiwan on December 24, 2020. It received 4 nominations at the 57th Golden Horse Awards, including Best Original Screenplay, Best Leading Actress for Gwei, Best Supporting Actor for Michael, Best Makeup & Costume Design.

== Plot ==
A wife who battles to keep her husband’s body intact after he dies of a leg amputation.

== Cast ==
- Gwei Lun-mei as Qian Yuying
- Tony Yang as Zheng Zihan
- Michael Chang as Yuehan
- Chin Shih-chieh as Yuan Zhang
- Lee Lee-zen as Doctor Gao
- Lin Chih-ju as Wang Qian
- Chen Yi-wen as a senior police officer
- Chang Li-tung as a young policeman
- Wang Tzu-chiang as a security guard
- Yang Li-yin as Yang [Director of Pathology Department]
- Liu Liang-tso as Director of General Affairs Copan
- Shih Ming-shuai as Mr. Chen [Casino]
- Jag Huang as a truck driver
- Nadow Lin as ambulance driver
- Liu Kuan-ting as William
- Charles Tu

== Awards and nominations ==
Award	Category	Recipients	Result	Notes
57th Golden Horse Awards	Best Original Screenplay	Chang Yao-sheng, Chung Mong-hong	Nominated	
57th Golden Horse Awards	Best Leading Actress	Gwei Lun-mei	Nominated	
57th Golden Horse Awards	Best Supporting Actor	Michael Chang	Nominated	
57th Golden Horse Awards	Best Makeup & Costume Design	Hsu Li-wen	Nominated	
2nd Taiwan Film Critics Society Awards	Best Screenplay	Chang Yao-sheng, Chung Mong-hong	Nominated	
23rd Taipei Film Awards	Best Music	Luming Lu	Won	
