= The Great Buddha+ =

- Theatrical release poster
- Chinese: 大佛普拉斯
- Hanyu Pinyin: Dàfó Pǔlāsī
- Hokkien POJ: Tāi-hu̍t Phó͘-la-su
- Directed by: Huang Hsin-yao
- Screenplay by: Huang Hsin-yao
- Based on: The Great Buddha by Huang Hsin-yao
- Produced by: Yeh Ju-feng; Chung Mong-hong
- Starring: Cres Chuang; Bamboo Chen; Leon Dai; Na Dow
- Narrated by: Huang Hsin-yao
- Cinematography: Nagao Nakashima
- Edited by: Lai Hsiu-hsiung
- Music by: Lin Sheng Xiang
- Production companies: MandarinVision; Cream Production
- Distributed by: Applause Entertainment; Cheng Cheng Films
- Release dates: June 29, 2017 (Taipei); October 13, 2017 (Taiwan)
- Running time: 104 minutes
- Country: Taiwan
- Languages: Taiwanese Hokkien; Mandarin; English
- Box office: NT$28.4 million (Taiwan)

The Great Buddha+ is a 2017 Taiwanese dark comedy film written and directed by Huang Hsin-yao. The story is about a security guard at a Buddha statue factory, along with his friend, a recyclables collector, becomes entangled in a web of dark secrets after stumbling upon videos that document the promiscuous meetings of the factory's wealthy owner. Critics believe this story reveals the absurdity of human nature and guides the thinking of ethical philosophy.

The Great Buddha+ is Huang's feature film directorial debut. It won the top prize at the 19th Taipei Film Festival and received 10 nominations at the 54th Golden Horse Awards, winning Best Adapted Screenplay and Best New Director for Huang.

== Plot ==
Kevin (Huang-Qiwen) is the owner of a Buddha statue factory in Taiwan's countryside. He is a famous artist and philanthropist. However, behind that, his life is wanton and he bribed and colluded with many officials to win bids. The factory is recently working on a giant Buddha statue for an upcoming ceremony. The statue is almost finished except for the Buddha's head and body, which need to be soldered. Pickle (Caipu) is a security guard at the factory who works for Kevin. Belly Button (Ducai) is Pickle's only friend, who scavenges for a living.

One day, Belly Button sneaks into Pickle's security room to watch his boss Kevin's carcorder together to see what a rich man's life looks like. From the cardorder, Belly Button and Pickle find Kevin kills his mistress and seals her body inside the Buddha statue. Later Kevin is taken to the police department as a suspect. However, because Kevin has bribed the local prosecutor, the prosecutor forces the police to stop the investigation.

After discovering Kevin's secrets, Belly Button and Pickle live in fear. However, Kevin still realizes everything by watching Belly Button and Pickle's unusual behavior. To maintain his reputation, Kevin takes action. Later, Belly Button is found dead in a drunk driving crash. But he never drank.

At the ceremony, the Buddha statue is placed in the center of a chamber, surrounded by thousands of monks and believers. Suddenly, a knocking sound comes from inside the Buddha statue...

== Cast ==
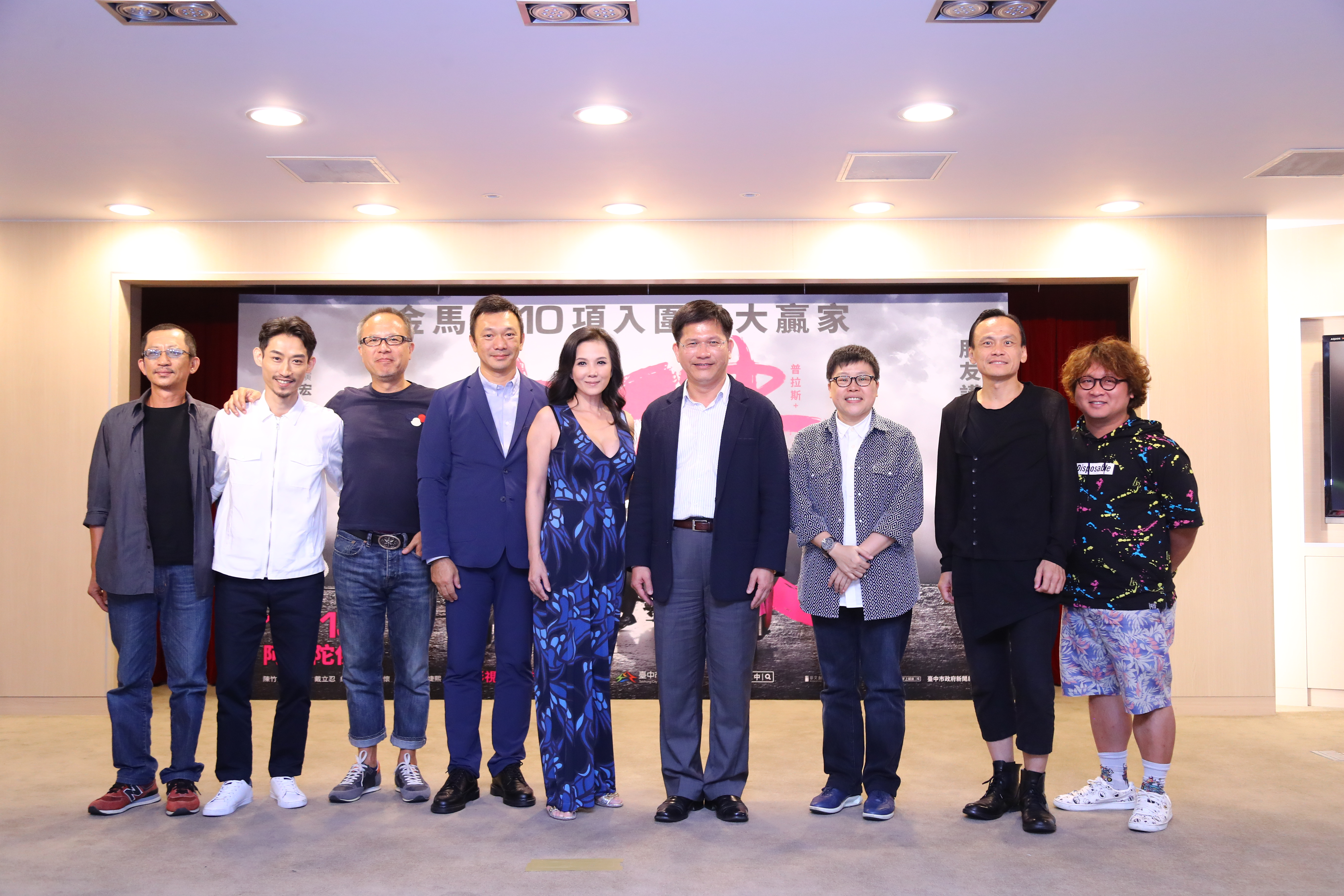
Lin Chia-lung and the film cast

- Cres Chuang as Pickle
- Bamboo Chen as Belly Button
- Leon Dai as Kevin
- Na Dow as Peanut
- Chang Shao-huai as Sakya
- Ting Kuo-lin as Yeh Feng-ju
- JC Lei as Gucci
- Chen Yi-wen as Kao
- Vincent Liang as Police chief
- Yu An-shun as Police officer
- Jutoupi as Singer
- Lee Yung-feng as Deputy speaker
- Lin Mei-hsiu as Senior
- Cheng Yu-tong (Evelyn Cheng) as Kao's secretary
- Hsien Tuo (as Tuo-Shen Chen) as Pickle's Uncle

== Production ==
=== Script writing ===
The film is an extension of director Huang Hsin-yao's 2014 Golden Horse Award-nominated short, The Great Buddha (大佛). According to Huang, the inclusion of "+" in the feature's title is a reference to the Apple smartphone iPhone 6 Plus, which was released around the time when he began expanding his short to a feature. In an interview, Huang also clarified that The Great Buddha+ was not shot on iPhone.

In an interview with Phoenix Entertainment, Huang mentions he used to film in a Buddha statue factory, and there was a giant Buddha statue made from copper, about 40 feet high. His first thought was that no one knew what was in the statue, so he had the idea to hide Yeh's body in the Buddha statue. Huang had a car crash, and the carcorder was used at that time. After that, he thinks the carcorder is an interesting thing that the camera faces outside but records the sound inside the car. Huang also explains that many people are just like Belly Button and Pickle, but society always ignores them. Therefore Huang thinks he needs to write a story about them based on his perception of life.

=== Filming ===
One-third of the scenes in The Great Buddha+ are filmed in Taichung City. Shooting locations include Taichung Yuemei Sugar Factory, Tai'an railway station, Shalutong General Hospital, Dajia Police Station, Da'an Beach, Nantun District, Xitun District, Waipu District, Houli District, etc. During the production, the Taichung government, as the only local government supporting the production of The Great Buddha+, provided funds and filming assistance services.

To depict Belly Button and Pickle's life more deeply with the high-contrast scene, Huang Hsin-yao filmed The Great Buddha+ mostly in black and white, except for the scenes through the carcorder. Huang uses this technique to show the idea of " Voyeurism." Huang believes people tend to read gossip magazines about celebrities because there is a voyeuristic desire, and they think that those celebrities have "colorful" life. Therefore Huang uses colorful carcorder video and black and white reality to reflect the Belly Button and Pickle's imagination of the upper-class world.

=== Soundtrack ===
The composer of The Great Buddha+ soundtrack is Lin-Shengxiang. He worked with his band to arrange the album. It took them less than a month to finish the composition and the recording of the album. This album won the Best Original Film Score on Taipei Golden Horse Film Festival 2017. Singles released from The Great Buddha+ album include:

- Secrets under the Mahogany Table
- Let's Take a Peep at the Chairman's Good Deeds
- Turning Back
- Belly Button's Friend
- What's the Matter
- Surfing with the Chairman
- The Murder
- Peace and Safety
- Sugar Apple's Presentiment
- Pickle's Troubles
- UFO
- To Have, or Not To Have
- Xu, spelled X-U

Secrets under the Mahogany Table combines the style of folk tunes and jazz, which Lin-Shengxiang wants to express the vitality of a country trumpet. In Let's Take a Peep at the Chairman's Good Deeds, Lin-Shengxiang uses an electric guitar to represent the active Belly Button (Du Cai), and the electric Yueqin to represent dull and silly Pickle (Cai Po). Belly Button's Friend has a lively melody, played by Six-string Yueqin and acoustic guitar. Sugar Apple's Presentiment shares the same melody as Belly Button's Friend but is played with the harmonica. The ending theme song To Have, or Not To Have is composed by Lin Shengxiang, and Wang Zhaohua writes the lyrics. It is the only song in the album with lyrics. Lin uses Hollow guitar, classical guitar, bass, and drums as the main instruments in this song. Lin wrote songs for each of the main characters, which he aims to make the soundtrack as the third narrative of the film.

== Themes ==
The critics thinkThe Great Buddha+ is a story about underclass people. Besides Belly Button and Pickle, the film sculptured many characters of the underclass, such as Sakya, Potato, and the suicide man in the abandoned building. The director Huang mentions that society usually ignores those people because the majority only focuses on those with privilege and power. And he believes those who facilitate the advancement of society are the underclass people. Huang says he wants to make every human being unique and three-dimensional in the film. Therefore, Huang creates a small UFO house in Belly Button's house. There are lots of Belly Button's imagination in this UFO house, such as girls, and childhood memories, which symbolize his dream and universe. Another character, Sakya, never works, wearing the same shirt every day, and the most he does is ride a bike around the village. Huang explains that Sakya is a figure of Buddha, a free man with no desires or ambitions. Huang uses Sakya to provoke people to think of the meaning of living and what we are chasing.

Huang makes the film end with a continuous sound of hitting from inside the Buddha statue. After the film fades to black, the sound continues. Huang says he aims to create such an effect for those who think they are watching the movie as a spectator but end up realizing they are part of the story. People can never escape from this whirlpool of humanity. Everyone is knocking on the Buddha and shouting, but no one can escape their fate.

== Awards and nominations ==
Award	Category	Recipients	Result	Ref.
54th Golden Horse Awards	Best Feature Film	The Great Buddha+	Nominated	
54th Golden Horse Awards	Best Supporting Actor	Leon Dai	Nominated	
54th Golden Horse Awards	Best New Director	Huang Hsin-yao	Won	
54th Golden Horse Awards	Best Adapted Screenplay	Huang Hsin-yao	Won	
54th Golden Horse Awards	Best Cinematography	Nagao Nakashima	Won	
54th Golden Horse Awards	Best Art Direction	Chao Shih-hao	Nominated	
54th Golden Horse Awards	Best Original Film Score	Lin Sheng-xiang	Won	
54th Golden Horse Awards	Best Original Film Song	"To Have, or Not to Have"; Composer：Lin Sheng-xiang; Lyrics: Ong Chiau-hoa; Performer: Lin Sheng-xiang	Won	
54th Golden Horse Awards	Best Film Editing	Lai Hsiu-hsiung	Nominated	
54th Golden Horse Awards	Best Sound Effects	Tu Duu-chih and Wu Shu-yao	Nominated	
19th Taipei Film Awards	Grand Prize	The Great Buddha+	Won	
19th Taipei Film Awards	Best Narrative Feature	The Great Buddha+	Won	
19th Taipei Film Awards	Outstanding Artistic Contribution in Editing	Lai Hsiu-hsiung	Won	
19th Taipei Film Awards	Outstanding Artistic Contribution in Music	Lin Sheng-xiang	Won	
19th Taipei Film Awards	Outstanding Artistic Contribution in Art Direction	Chao Shih-hao	Won	
2017 Toronto International Film Festival	NETPAC Award	The Great Buddha+	Won	
37th Hong Kong Film Awards	Best Film from Mainland and Taiwan	The Great Buddha+	Won	

== See also ==
- List of submissions to the 91st Academy Awards for Best Foreign Language Film
- List of Taiwanese submissions for the Academy Award for Best Foreign Language Film
