= The Silent Forest =

2020 Taiwanese thriller film

- Traditional Chinese: 無聲
- Hanyu Pinyin: Wúshēng
- Hokkien POJ: Bô‑siaⁿ
- Directed by: Ko Chen-Nien
- Written by: Ko Chen-Nien; Lin Pin-chun
- Produced by: Arthur Chu Yu-ning
- Starring: Buffy Chen; Troy Liu; Liu Kuan-ting; Yang Kuei-mei
- Edited by: Milk Su; Chen Chun-hung
- Music by: Luming Lu
- Production companies: PTS; mm2 Entertainment; Redbit Pictures
- Distributed by: Catchplay; PTS
- Release dates: 25 June 2020 (Taipei Film Festival); 15 October 2020 (Taiwan); 11 October 2019 (Hong Kong); 1 June 2021 (Malaysia); 30 June 2021 (Thailand)
- Running time: 104 minutes
- Country: Taiwan
- Languages: Mandarin; Taiwanese Hokkien; Taiwanese Sign Language
- Budget: NT$30 million
- Box office: NT$50.05 million

The Silent Forest (Chinese: 無聲; lit. 'silence') is a 2020 Taiwanese social psychological thriller drama film directed by Ko Chien-Nien. The film was inspired by a real-life sexual abuse scandal at National Tainan Special School, a Taiwanese school for the deaf. It was nominated for 8 Golden Horse Awards and won 2 awards, for Best New Performer and Best Sound Effects. The film released in Taiwan on 15 October 2020, and was exclusively released on HowPro+ and Disney+ Hotstar in Malaysia on 1 June 2021, and in Thailand on 30 June 2021.

== Cast ==
- Troy Liu as Chang Chen
- Buffy Chen as Yao Bei Bei
- Liu Kuan-ting as Wang Ta-chun
- Yang Kuei-mei as principal
- Kim Hyun-bin as Xiao Guang
- Jimmy Pan Chin-Yu as Yu Xiang
- Tai Bo as Bei Bei's grandpa
- Chang Pen-yu as Chang Cheng's mother
- Vera Chen as the class instructor
- Fan Ruixiu as Baodi
- Wang Shihao as Da Hungry
- Liao Junwei as Weihua
- Zheng Weiyi as little crooked
- Wang Jianmin as Teacher Weng
- Zeng Peiyu as Xiaoguang's mother
- Huang Shang-Ho as a police officer

== Plot ==
A teenage boy, Chang Cheng (Tzu-Chuan Liu), chases an old man and begins beating him in front of police officers. The officers pull Chang Cheng off the old man. They don't understand the boy and takes him to the police station. They discover he is deaf. One of the teachers from the school for the hearing impaired, Mr. Wang (Kuan-Ting Liu), arrives and helps Chang Cheng communicate. Chang Cheng accuses the old man of stealing his wallet on the train, but the cops claim that the old man found the wallet and that it was all a misunderstanding. Mr. Wang tells the cops that Chang Cheng is sorry, to get him out of trouble. Chang Cheng asks Mr. Wang if he believes him; Mr. Wang responds that he tends to believe the deaf.

Mr. Wang takes Chang Cheng to his new school and suggests he attend the school dance that night. Chang Cheng, not knowing anyone at school, is left alone. Eventually he is pulled into the crowd and dances, enjoying himself.

Chang Cheng notices classmate Bei Bei (Buffy Chen) on the bus to school. He watches her chat and laugh with her friends. In class, Chang Cheng continues to watch Bei Bei. When he sees her acting strangely, he throws paper at her and asks what she's doing. She tells him she's holding her breath. That night, Chang Cheng gets out of bed and sees lights flashing in the bathroom. It is Bei Bei flashing a light from down below. She tells him to come out. They go to the school swimming pool. Chang Cheng asks about the lights, and Bei Bei says they are just playing. She dives into the pool to avoid his questions. She wants to learn to swim.

On the bus the next day, Chang Cheng looks for Bei Bei and sees sweaters hung up as a screen. He heads to the back of the bus and finds a group of boys holding Bei Bei down and raping her. The leader of the group, Xiao Guang (Kim Hyeon-Bin), motions to Chang Cheng to keep mum. The boys continue to rape Bei Bei as she cries and throw a sweater over her head. Chang Cheng watches in horror before fleeing. The bus chaperone notices the rape, but stays silent. That night, Chang Cheng's mother asks if he's made any friends and if he likes his new school. Chang Cheng nods.

Chang Cheng watches Bei Bei play soccer at school with the boys who raped her. That night, the boys drag Chang Cheng out of bed. Xiao Guang tells him that they should play together. The boys try to force Chang Cheng into the bathroom, but the alarm goes off, and the boys scatter. Chang Cheng goes to the pool with Bei Bei. He asks if she set off the alarm and asks why she still plays with the boys and hasn't told the teachers. Bei Bei says he should stay silent or the boys will bully him. She says the boys are nice to her most of the time, but she doesn't like it when they rape her. She suggests that Chang Cheng bully her with them, so he won't be alone.

Chang Cheng tells Mr. Wang about the rape, then takes Bei Bei off the bus and brings her to Mr. Wang. Bei Bei, at first reluctant to "betray" the boys, tell Mr. Wang the truth.

In a flashback, a boy sits next to Bei Bei on the bus and grows aggressive as she tries to push him away. He sexually assaults her. Another female student tries to help her, but the boys push her away, as does the teacher at the front of the bus. After the boy rapes Bei Bei, she writes down what happened and tells a female teacher. The teacher gaslights her and claims that the boys are good kids and would never hurt her. Bei Bei looks defeated.

In the present, Mr. Wang confronts the principal, who tries to gaslight Mr. Wang into silence. Mr. Wang says he won't stay silent. He and the principal interview all the students and discover that everyone has been a victim of rape, sexual assault, bullying, and more. All the students say they're forced to do these things by Xiao Guang. During Xiao Guang's interview, he claims to just be playing. His parents are called in and scold him. As revenge, Xiao Guang has a group of boys beat up Chang Cheng. Bei Bei's grandfather keeps her home from school.

Chang Cheng goes to the movies with Bei Bei. The theater double books their seats, and the pair leaves when another couple claims their seats and makes a scene. On their way home, the pair sees a man being beaten in an alley. Bei Bei says she wants to go back to school, because she cannot survive in the outside world. Chang Cheng asks Mr. Wang to convince Bei Bei's grandfather to let her go back to school, but her grandpa refuses. Chang Cheng tries to communicate through text on his phone, but Bei Bei's grandfather refuses to read and pushes him away. Chang Cheng loses his hearing aid and is nearly hit by a cart. The owner gets angry and yells at Chang Cheng. Bei Bei's grandfather takes pity on Chang Cheng and pays for the damage. He listens to Chang Cheng's explanation and allows Bei Bei to return to school, as Chang Cheng says he will protect her.

In the school cafeteria, Chang Cheng sees Xiao Guang becoming upset after looking at his phone. Mr. Wang drives Bei Bei home. Xiao Guang and the boys grab Chang Cheng and tell him that Bao Di (played by Fan Riu Xiu) wants to play with him. Xiao Guang orders Chang Cheng to perform oral sex on Bao Di, who is gagged and restrained, and claims they won't bully Bei Bei anymore. Chang Cheng does as he is told, assaulting an unwilling Bao Di, while one of the boys films it on his phone.

At a school ceremony, Xiao Guang is disturbed by something on his phone and runs outside. Chang Cheng brings lunch for Bei Bei, but she isn't at their meeting place. She is in the bathroom, again raped by Xiao Guang. She tells Mr. Wang that she wants to stay at school and that what happened is nothing. She doesn't want her grandparents to blame Mr. Wang. Mr. Wang, upset, walks away. Chang Cheng beats up Xiao Guang.

Xiao Guang cuts his wrists and is hospitalized. His mother tells Mr. Wang that Xiao Guang is stressed out with studying and that he's innocent. Mr. Wang ask Xiao Guang what happened, but Xiao Guang continues to say they were just playing. Chang Cheng's mother sees the video of him and Bao Di and tells him to transfer schools. Chang Cheng refuses. Bei Bei sees the video and confronts Bao Di. Bao Di says Chang Cheng assaulted him and refuses to go to the teacher with Bei Bei. Bao Di tells her that Chang Cheng did it so they would stop bullying Bei Bei.

Bei Bei goes for surgery. As Chang Cheng and Mr. Wang look for her, Chang Cheng is hit by a motorcycle. Mr. Wang interrupts Bei Bei's surgery. The clinic is not sanitary, and Bei Bei falls in a coma due to infection. It is revealed that the surgery is to prevent Bei Bei from getting pregnant if she were raped again.

Xiao Guang is visited in the hospital by someone. Chang Cheng storms in with a hammer, only to find Xiao Guang cutting his wrists again. The next day, two boys show Chang Cheng a video from the school security camera, showing that a teacher, Mr. Weng, has been raping and assaulting Xiao Guang since he was a child. Chang Cheng shows the video to Mr. Wang, who confronts the principal. The principal has known all along and continues to gaslight Mr. Wang. Xiao Guang tells Mr. Wang that he wants to hate Mr. Weng, but can't. When Mr. Weng visited Xiao Guang in the hospital, Xiao Guang touched Mr. Weng. Xiao Guang feels he doesn't deserves to live.

The story comes out in the news and the principal is fired. The kids appear to be lighthearted on the bus. At the back of the bus, Bao Di glares at Chang Cheng. Bao Di gets up and approaches his sleeping classmate.
