= Classmates Minus =

- Film poster
- Traditional Chinese: 同學麥娜絲
- Simplified Chinese: 同学麦娜丝
- Hanyu Pinyin: Tóngxué mài nà sī
- Hokkien POJ: Tông-o̍h Ma̋i-ná-suh
- Directed by: Huang Hsin-yao
- Written by: Huang Hsin-yao
- Based on: Bluffing by Huang Hsin-yao
- Produced by: Chung Mong-hong; Yeh Ju-feng; Sung Ming-chung; Jessie Ho; Zeng Han-ting; Li Heng-jie
- Starring: Shih Ming-shuai; Cheng Jen-shuo; Nadow Lin; Liu Kuan-ting; Chen Yi-wen
- Cinematography: Chung Mong-hong
- Edited by: Lai Hsiu-hsiung
- Music by: Ko Ren-Chien; Eddie Tsai
- Production companies: Cream Film Production; Mandarin Vision
- Distributed by: Applause Entertainment Limited Taiwan; Netflix
- Release dates: 5 November 2020 (57th Golden Horse Awards); 20 November 2020 (Taiwan)
- Running time: 122 minutes
- Country: Taiwan
- Languages: Mandarin; Taiwanese Hokkien
- Box office: NT$44,855,962

Classmates Minus (Chinese: 同學麥娜絲) is a 2020 Taiwanese political black comedy-drama film written and directed by Huang Hsin-yao, and starring Shih Ming-shuai, Cheng Jen-shuo, Nadow Lin, Liu Kuan-ting and Chen Yi-wen. The film was screened at the 57th Golden Horse Awards on November 5, 2020, and it had seen a theatrical release in Taiwan on the 20th of the same month. It was available for streaming worldwide via Netflix on February 20, 2021.

== Synopsis ==
Four school buddies — a director, a temp worker, an insurance salesman and a paper craftsman — grapple with unfulfilled dreams amid middle age ennui.

== Cast ==
- Shih Ming-shuai as Tom
- Cheng Jen-shuo as Fan Man
- Nadow Lin as Tin Can
- Liu Kuan-ting as Lee Hung-chang
- Chen Yi-wen as Congressman Gao
- Lotus Wang as A-Yue
- Ada Pan as Minus
- Jennifer Hung Shiao-ling as A-Zen
- Jacqueline Zhu as A-Zhi
- Evelyn Zheng Yu-tong as Valérie

== Awards and nominations ==
Award	Category	Recipients	Result	Notes
57th Golden Horse Awards	Best Feature Film	"Classmates Minus"	Nominated	
57th Golden Horse Awards	Audience Choice Award	"Classmates Minus"	Won	
57th Golden Horse Awards	Best Adapted Screenplay	Huang Hsin-yao	Nominated	
57th Golden Horse Awards	Best Director	Huang Hsin-yao	Nominated	
57th Golden Horse Awards	Best Supporting Actor	Nadow Lin	Won	
57th Golden Horse Awards	Best Supporting Actor	Cheng Jen-shuo	Nominated	
57th Golden Horse Awards	Best Film Editing	Lai Hsiu-hsiung	Nominated	
57th Golden Horse Awards	Best Cinematography	Chung Mong-hong	Nominated	
57th Golden Horse Awards	Best Art Direction	Chao Shih-hao	Won	
57th Golden Horse Awards	Best Original Film Score	Ko Ren-chien, Eddie Tsai	Nominated	
