= The Cabbie =

2000 film directed by Chang Huakun and Chen Yi-wen

- Film poster
- Directed by: Chang Huakun; Chen Yi-wen
- Written by: Su Chaobin
- Produced by: Chang Hwa-kun; Chiu Shun-ching; Huang Lin-hsiang
- Starring: Rie Miyazawa; Chung-Heng Chu; Tai Bo; Joyce H. Cheng; Tsai Tsan-te
- Cinematography: Tsai Cheng-tai
- Edited by: Chen Po-wen
- Music by: Lo Ta-yu
- Production companies: Central Motion Picture Corporation; City Films Ltd.
- Distributed by: Central Motion Picture Corporation
- Release date: 10 October 2000 (Taiwan)
- Running time: 94 minutes
- Country: Taiwan
- Language: Mandarin

The Cabbie (Chinese: 運轉手之戀) is a 2000 Taiwanese film directed by Chang Huakun and Chen Yi-wen. It was Taiwan's submission to the 74th Academy Awards for the Academy Award for Best Foreign Language Film, but was not accepted as a nominee.

== Cast ==
- Rie Miyazawa
- Chung-Heng Chu
- Tai Bo
- Joyce H. Cheng
- Tsai Tsan-te
- Chao-Bin Su
- Tsung Sheng Tang
- Leon Dai
- Hsin-Ling Chung
- Wei-Ming Wang
- Hsin Shao
- Duan Chun-hao
- Chuan Wang
- I-Chen Ko
- Shao-Wen Yang
- Chen-Nan Tsai
- Yueh-Hsun Tsai
- Phoenix Chang
- Li-Chun Lee
- You-Ning Lee
- Feng-Ying Lin

== Reception ==
Derek Elley of Variety praised the film's structure and cinematography, calling it an "entertaining movie that straddles the deep divide between commercial and high-art fare." Time Out stated: "Wise, worldly and put together with unfailing dark wit, this is an absolute joy."

The film is considered Rie's comeback after a stagnant period in her career.

== See also ==
- Cinema of Taiwan
- List of submissions to the 74th Academy Awards for Best Foreign Language Film
