= Double Happiness =

Double Happiness may refer to:

- Double Happiness (album), a 2005 album by Australian musician Jimmy Barnes
- Double Happiness (TV series), a Singaporean drama series
- Double Happiness II, a Singaporean drama series and a sequel to Double Happiness
- Double Happiness (film), a 1994 movie starring Sandra Oh
- Double Happiness (book), a photobook by Chien-Chi Chang
- Double Happiness (cigarette), a brand of cigarettes in China
- Double Happiness (company), a brand of athletic equipment (specialty in table tennis) in China
- Double Happiness (calligraphy), a Chinese calligraphic character 囍
- Double Happiness, 1996 album by the band Slow Gherkin
