= Chung Mong-hong =

Taiwanese film director (born 1965)

- Born: 1965 (age 60–61); Jiadong, Pingtung County, Taiwan
- Occupations: Film director, screenwriter, cinematographer

Chung Mong-hong (Chinese: 鍾孟宏; pinyin: Zhōng Mènghóng; born 1965), also known by his pseudonym, Nagao Nakashima (Japanese: 中島 長雄, romanized: Nakashima Nagao; or in pinyin: Zhōngdǎo Zhǎngxióng), is a Taiwanese film director, screenwriter and cinematographer.

== Career ==
Chung received the Golden Horse Award for Best Director for his film The Fourth Portrait in 2010 at the 47th Golden Horse Awards. His film Soul was selected as the Taiwanese entry for Best Foreign Language Film at the 86th Academy Awards, but was not nominated. He won Best Director and Best Narrative Feature at the 56th Golden Horse Awards for his film A Sun in 2019.

In June 2025, Chung was invited to join the Directors Branch of the Academy of Motion Picture Arts and Sciences.

Chung originally used the pseudonym "Nagao Nakashima" in Parking after he took over the role of cinematographer following the previous one "abruptly quitting". He continued to use the name to credit himself separately as the director or photography in all the films he directed up to The Falls, where he credited himself in the role using his actual name.

== Filmography ==
=== Director ===
==== Features ====
- 2008: Parking (停車)
- 2010: The Fourth Portrait (第四張畫)
- 2013: Soul (失魂)
- 2016: Godspeed (一路順風)
- 2019: A Sun (陽光普照)
- 2021: The Falls (瀑布)
- 2024: The Embers

==== Documentaries ====
- 2006: Doctor (醫生)

=== Cinematographer and producer ===
- 2017: The Great Buddha+ (大佛普拉斯)
- 2020: Classmates Minus (同學麥娜絲)
- 2020: A Leg (腿)
