= Golden Horse Award for Best Original Screenplay =

Taiwanese film award

- Country: Taiwan
- Presented by: Taipei Golden Horse Film Festival Executive Committee
- First award: 1962
- Currently held by: Chen Yu-hsun for A Foggy Tale (2025)
- Website: goldenhorse.org.tw

The Golden Horse Award for Best Original Screenplay (Chinese: 金馬獎最佳原著劇本; pinyin: Jīnmǎ jiǎng zuì jiā yuánzhù jùběn) is presented annually at Taiwan's Golden Horse Film Awards.

It was first awarded in 1962 as Best Screenplay. Starting from the 16th Golden Horse Awards in 1979, it was split into two separate categories, the other being the Golden Horse Award for Best Adapted Screenplay.

== Winners and nominees ==
=== 1970s ===
Year	Recipient(s)	English title	Original title
1979 (16th)	Chang Yung-hsiang	Story of a Small Town	小城故事
1979 (16th)	Lin Huang-kun	Love in Chilly Spring	春寒
1979 (16th)	Sung Hsiang-ju	A Special Smile	歡顏

=== 1980s ===
Year	Recipient(s)	English title	Original title
1980 (17th)	Sung Hsiang-ju	To You with Love	候鳥之愛
1980 (17th)	Wang Chu-chin, Kuan Kuan	The Legend of the Six Dynasty	六朝怪談
1980 (17th)	Chan Wan-man	The Secret	瘋劫
1981 (18th)	Wu Nien-jen	Classmates	同班同學
1981 (18th)	Raymond Wong Pak-ming, Szeto Cheuk-Hon	All the Wrong Clues for the Right Solution	夜來香
1981 (18th)	Lin Ching-chieh	Student Days	學生之愛

=== 1990s ===
Year	Recipient(s)	English title	Original title
1990 (27th)	Wu Nien-jen	Song of the Exile	客途秋恨
1990 (27th)	Eddie Fong	Farewell China	愛在他鄉的季節
1990 (27th)	Sanmao, Yim Ho	Red Dust	滾滾紅塵
1991 (28th)	Edward Yang, Yen Hung-ya, Alex Yang, Lai Ming-tong	A Brighter Summer Day	牯嶺街少年殺人事件
1991 (28th)	Chiu Kang-chien, Peggy Chiao	Center Stage	阮玲玉
1991 (28th)	Ang Lee	Pushing Hands	推手
1991 (28th)	Chan Man-keung, Sin Gam-ching	Dreams of Glory: A Boxer's Story	拳王
1992 (29th)	Wu Nien-jen	Hill of No Return	無言的山丘
1992 (29th)	Tsai Ming-liang	Rebels of the Neon God	青少年哪吒
1992 (29th)	Evans Chan	To Liv(e)	浮世戀曲
1992 (29th)	Chou Tan	The Noblest Way to Die	黃金稻田
1993 (30th)	Neil Peng, Ang Lee	The Wedding Banquet	喜宴
1993 (30th)	Eddie Fong	Autumn Moon	秋月
1993 (30th)	Derek Yee	C'est la vie, mon chéri	新不了情
1993 (30th)	Eddie Fong, Lee Bik-wah	Temptation of a Monk	誘僧
1994 (31st)	Edward Yang	A Confucian Confusion	獨立時代
1994 (31st)	Ang Lee, Wang Hui-ling	Eat Drink Man Woman	飲食男女
1994 (31st)	Ma Wai-ho	Over the Rainbow, Under the Skirt	記得香蕉成熟時II之初戀情人
1994 (31st)	Wu Nien-jen	A Borrowed Life	多桑
1995 (32nd)	Chen Yu-hsun	Tropical Fish	熱帶魚
1995 (32nd)	Ah Cheng	Maiden Rose	一罈女兒紅
1995 (32nd)	Chan Man-keung	Summer Snow	女人四十
1995 (32nd)	Liao Ching-sung, Wu Nien-jen, Wan Jen	Super Citizen Ko	超級大國民
1996 (33rd)	Zhang Zeming	Foreign Moon	月滿英倫
1996 (33rd)	Khan Lee, Sylvia Chang	Tonight Nobody Goes Home	今天不回家
1996 (33rd)	Eddie Fong, Clara Law	Floating Life	
1996 (33rd)	Chan Bo-wa, James Yuen, Aubrey Lam, Ivy Ho	The Age of Miracles	鬼婆婆
1997 (34th)	Fruit Chan	Made in Hong Kong	香港製造
1997 (34th)	Ivy Ho	Comrades: Almost a Love Story	甜蜜蜜
1997 (34th)	Chen Yu-hsun	Love Go Go	愛情來了
1997 (34th)	Wang Shaudi	Yours and Mine	我的神經病
1998 (35th)	Mabel Cheung, Alex Law	City of Glass	玻璃之城
1998 (35th)	James Yuen	Your Place or Mine!	每天愛你八小時
1998 (35th)	Takkie Yeung	The Pale Sky	沒有小鳥的天空
1998 (35th)	Szeto Kam-Yuen, Yau Nai-hoi	The Longest Nite	暗花之殺人條件
1999 (36th)	Chang Tso-chi	Darkness and Light	黑暗之光
1999 (36th)	Chan Kin Chung	Ordinary Heroes	千言萬語
1999 (36th)	Yeh Chin-sheng, Ko Shu-chin, Tseng Yu Wen	March of Happiness	天馬茶房
1999 (36th)	Wong Jing	A Dumb Boy	笨小孩

=== 2000s ===
Year	Recipient(s)	English title	Original title
2000 (37th)	Fruit Chan	Little Cheung	細路祥
2000 (37th)	Wong Kar-wai	In the Mood for Love	花樣年華
2000 (37th)	Yeung Sin-ling, Au Shui Lin, Rat	Spacked Out	無人駕駛
2000 (37th)	Su Chao-pin	The Cabbie	運轉手之戀
2001 (38th)	Fruit Chan	Durian Durian	榴槤飄飄
2001 (38th)	Wang Xiaoshuai, Tang Danian, Peggy Chiao, Hsu Hsiao-ming	Beijing Bicycle	十七岁的单车
2001 (38th)	Tsai Ming-liang, Being Young	What Time Is It There?	你那邊幾點
2001 (38th)	Tse Loh Sze	Gimme Gimme	愛上我吧
2002 (39th)	Ivy Ho	July Rhapsody	男人四十
2002 (39th)	Lam Wah Chuen	The Runaway Pistol	走火槍
2002 (39th)	Chang Tso-chi	The Best of Times	美麗時光
2002 (39th)	Fruit Chan	Hollywood Hong Kong	香港有個荷里活
2003 (40th)	Yau Nai-hoi, Au Kin-yee	PTU	
2003 (40th)	Pang Ho-cheung, Patrick Kong, Erica Li	Men Suddenly in Black	大丈夫
2003 (40th)	Felix Chong, Alan Mak	Infernal Affairs	無間道
2003 (40th)	Lee Rueg Shyun, Shyu Gong Ching, Huang Su Yu	Black Dog Is Coming	黑狗來了
2004 (41st)	Yau Nai-hoi, Yip Tin-shing, Au Kin-yee	Throw Down	柔道龍虎榜
2004 (41st)	Lu Chuan	Kekexili: Mountain Patrol	可可西里
2004 (41st)	Cheng Wen-tang, Cheng Jin Fen	The Passage	經過
2004 (41st)	Liming Huang, Wang Shaudi	Bear Hug	擁抱大白熊
2005 (42nd)	Yau Nai-hoi, Yip Tin-shing	Election	黑社會
2005 (42nd)	Pang Ho-cheung, Wong Wing-Si	Beyond Our Ken	公主復仇記
2005 (42nd)	Yim Ho, Zheng Xiao	A West Lake Moment	抹茶之戀味
2005 (42nd)	Chu Tʽien-wen, Hou Hsiao-hsien	Three Times	最好的時光
2006 (43rd)	Ning Hao	Crazy Stone	疯狂的石头
2006 (43rd)	Patrick Tam, Tian Koi-leong	After This Our Exile	父子
2006 (43rd)	Pan Zi-yuan, Liu Hsueh-jung	The Touch of Fate	指間的重量
2006 (43rd)	Su Chao-pin	Silk	詭絲
2007 (44th)	Tony Ayres	The Home Song Stories	
2007 (44th)	Bon Sek Yieng, Tan Wei Lyn	Just Follow Law	我在政府部門的日子
2007 (44th)	Derek Yee, Chun Tin-nam, Loong Man Hong, Go Sun	Protégé	門徒
2007 (44th)	Singing Chen, Lou Yi-an	God Man Dog	流浪神狗人
2008 (45th)	Tom Lin Shu-yu, Henry Tsai Tsung-han	Winds of September	九降風
2008 (45th)	Yang Ya-che	Orz Boyz	囧男孩
2008 (45th)	Xu Lan, Chun Tin-nam, Aubrey Lam, Huang Jianxin, Jojo Hui Yuet-chun, Ho Kei Ping, Guo Junli, James Yuen	The Warlords	投名狀
2008 (45th)	Ivy Ho	Claustrophobia	親密
2009 (46th)	Leon Dai, Akira Chen	Cannot Live Without You	不能沒有你
2009 (46th)	Cui Siwei, Xing Aina, Wang Hongwei, Wang Yao, Zhou Zhiyong, Yue Xiaojun, Zhang Cheng	Crazy Racer	疯狂的赛车
2009 (46th)	Eddie Fong, Clara Law	Like a Dream	如夢
2009 (46th)	Cheng Wen-tang, Cheng Jin Fen, Chang Yi-feng	The Tears	眼淚

=== 2010s ===
Year	Recipient(s)	English title	Original title
2010 (47th)	Liu Jie, Gao Shan	Judge	透析
2010 (47th)	Chang Tso-chi	When Love Comes	當愛來的時候
2010 (47th)	Hou Chi-jan	One Day	有一天
2010 (47th)	Chung Mong-hong, Steven Tu	The Fourth Portrait	第四張畫
2011 (48th)	Yang Nan-chian, Teng Yung-shing, Qin Hailu, Ge Wen-zhe, Xi Ran	Return Ticket	到阜陽六百里
2011 (48th)	Lin Yu-hsien, Wang Kuo-kuang, Wang Li-wen	Jump Ashin!	翻滾吧！阿信
2011 (48th)	Susan Chan	A Simple Life	桃姐
2011 (48th)	Zhang Meng	The Piano in a Factory	钢的琴
2012 (49th)	Milkyway Creative Team, Au Kin-yee, Wong King fai	Life Without Principle	奪命金
2012 (49th)	Yang Yi-chien	Cha Cha for Twins	寶米恰恰
2012 (49th)	Dai Yan, Gao Qunshu	Beijing Blues	神探亨特张
2012 (49th)	Mei Feng, Yu Fan, Lou Ye	Mystery	浮城谜事
2012 (49th)	Yang Ya-che	Girlfriend, Boyfriend	女朋友。男朋友
2013 (50th)	Anthony Chen	Ilo Ilo	爸媽不在家
2013 (50th)	Jia Zhangke	A Touch of Sin	天注定
2013 (50th)	Arthur Chu	To My Dear Granny	親愛的奶奶
2013 (50th)	Wai Ka-fai, Yau Nai-hoi, Ray Chan, Yu Xi	Drug War	毒戰
2013 (50th)	Zhou Zhiyong, Zhang Ji, Aubrey Lam	American Dreams in China	中国合伙人
2014 (51st)	Yee Chih-yen	Meeting Dr. Sun	行動代號：孫中山
2014 (51st)	Diao Yinan	Black Coal, Thin Ice	白日焰火
2014 (51st)	Xin Yukun, Feng Yuanliang	The Coffin in the Mountain	心迷宫
2014 (51st)	Wang Xiaoshuai, Fang Lei, Li Fei	Red Amnesia	闯入者
2014 (51st)	Li Qiang	The Golden Era	黃金時代
2015 (52nd)	Jia Zhangke	Mountains May Depart	山河故人
2015 (52nd)	Chang Tso-chi	Thanatos, Drunk	醉‧生夢死
2015 (52nd)	Tom Lin Shu-yu, Liu Wei-jan	Zinnia Flower	百日告別
2015 (52nd)	Guan Hu, Dong Runnian	Mr. Six	老炮儿
2015 (52nd)	Philip Yung	Port of Call	踏血尋梅
2016 (53rd)	Loong Man Hong, Thomas Ng Ki Wai, Mak Tin-shu	Trivisa	樹大招風
2016 (53rd)	Laha Mebow	Hang in There, Kids!	只要我長大
2016 (53rd)	Xue Xiaolu, Jiao Huajing	Finding Mr. Right 2	北京遇上西雅图之不二情书
2016 (53rd)	Zhang Dalei	The Summer Is Gone	八月
2016 (53rd)	Midi Z	The Road to Mandalay	再見瓦城
2017 (54th)	Zhou Ziyang	Old Beast	老獸
2017 (54th)	Liu Jian	Have a Nice Day	大世界
2017 (54th)	Sylvia Chang, You Xiao Ying	Love Education	相愛相親
2017 (54th)	Wang Yu-lin, Hsu Hua-chien, Hua Bai Rong, Juliana Hsu, Ann Chen	Alifu, the Prince/ss	阿莉芙
2017 (54th)	Yang Ya-che	The Bold, the Corrupt, and the Beautiful	血觀音
2018 (55th)	Han Jianv, Zhong Wei, Wen Muye	Dying to Survive	我不是药神
2018 (55th)	Lu Shih-yuan, Mag Hsu	Dear Ex	誰先愛上他的
2018 (55th)	Ho Wi-ding	Cities of Last Things	幸福城市
2018 (55th)	Shunji Iwai	Last Letter	你好，之华
2018 (55th)	Dong Yue	The Looming Storm	暴雪将至
2019 (56th)	Yeo Siew Hua	A Land Imagined	幻土
2019 (56th)	Chung Mong-hong, Chang Yao-sheng	A Sun	陽光普照
2019 (56th)	Ray Yeung	Suk Suk	叔．叔
2019 (56th)	Anthony Chen	Wet Season	热带雨
2019 (56th)	Wu Ke-xi, Midi Z	Nina Wu	灼人秘密

=== 2020s ===
Year	Recipient(s)	English title	Original title	Ref.
2020 (57th)	Chen Yu-hsun	My Missing Valentine	消失的情人節	
2020 (57th)	Chong Keat Aun	The Story of Southern Islet	南巫	
2020 (57th)	Chung Mong-hong, Chang Yao-sheng	A Leg	腿	
2020 (57th)	Cheng Yu-chieh	Dear Tenant	親愛的房客	
2020 (57th)	Ko Chen-nien, Lin Pin-jun	The Silent Forest	無聲	
2021 (58th)	Chung Mong-hong, Chang Yao-sheng	The Falls	瀑布	
2021 (58th)	Fiona Roan Feng-i, Li Bing	American Girl	美國女孩	
2021 (58th)	Lou Yi-an, Singing Chen	Goddamned Asura	該死的阿修羅	
2021 (58th)	Fruit Chan, Jason Lam Kee-to	Coffin Homes	鬼同你住	
2021 (58th)	Ko Shu-chin	Echo	高山上的熱氣球	
2022 (59th)	Lau Kok Rui	The Sunny Side of the Street	白日青春	
2022 (59th)	He Shuming, Kris Ong	Ajoomma	花路阿朱媽	
2022 (59th)	Chan Ching-lin	Coo-Coo 043	一家子兒咕咕叫	
2022 (59th)	Willie Chang, Kevin Ko	Incantation	咒	
2022 (59th)	Laha Mebow, Hsieh Hui-ching	Gaga	哈勇家	
2023 (60th)	Sun Jie	The Mountain Is Coming	大山來了	
2023 (60th)	Yan Xiaolin	Carp Leaping Over Dragon's Gate	菠蘿，鳳梨	
2023 (60th)	Huang Ji, Otsuka Ryuji	Stonewalling	石门	
2023 (60th)	Nick Cheuk	Time Still Turns the Pages	年少日記	
2023 (60th)	Chin Chia-hua	Trouble Girl	小曉	
2024 (61st)	Huang Xi	Daughter's Daughter	女兒的女兒	
2024 (61st)	Yeo Siew Hua	Stranger Eyes	默視錄	
2024 (61st)	Geng Jun	Bel Ami	漂亮朋友	
2024 (61st)	John Hsu, Vincent Tsai	Dead Talents Society	鬼才之道	
2024 (61st)	Tom Lin Shu-yu	Yen and Ai-Lee	小雁與吳愛麗	
2025 (62nd)	Chen Yu-hsun	A Foggy Tale	大濛	
2025 (62nd)	Lau Kek-huat	The Waves Will Carry Us	人生海海	
2025 (62nd)	Shih-Ching Tsou, Sean Baker	Left-Handed Girl	左撇子女孩	
2025 (62nd)	Zhuo Kailuo	Poor Taxi	遼河的士	
2025 (62nd)	Jun Li	Queerpanorama	眾生相	

== See also ==
- Academy Award for Best Original Screenplay
- Asian Film Award for Best Screenplay
- BAFTA Award for Best Original Screenplay
- Blue Dragon Film Award for Best Screenplay
- Hong Kong Film Award for Best Screenplay
- Japan Academy Film Prize for Screenplay of the Year
