= Return to Burma =

2011 film directed by Midi Z

Chinese name
- Chinese: 歸來的人
Transcriptions
Standard Mandarin
- Hanyu Pinyin: guilai de ren
- Directed by: Midi Z
- Written by: Midi Z
- Produced by: Midi Z; Patrick Mao Huang
- Starring: Wang Shin-Hong
- Cinematography: Midi Z
- Edited by: Lin Sheng-Wen; Midi Z
- Production companies: Seashore Image Productions; Flash Forward Entertainment; Montage Film
- Release dates: October 2011 (Busan); 6 July 2012 (Taiwan)
- Running time: 84
- Countries: Taiwan, Myanmar
- Languages: Burmese, Yunnan Dialect (mixed with local dialect in Thailand hand and Myanmar)

Return to Burma is the first feature movie directed by Taiwanese director Midi Z, who was born in Myanmar. It continues the theme of his short movie The Man From Hometown. The film is packed with Poor Folk (2012) and Ice Poison (2014) by the distributor as the director's "Homecoming Trilogy." The other two films of the trilogy depict the lives of illegal immigrants of Chinese ethnicity on the border of Myanmar.

Return to Burma is the first feature film in history to be shot and completed in Myanmar (Burma). It was selected for official competition for the New Currents Award at the 2011 Busan International Film Festival and was nominated the following year for the Tiger Award in the official competition section at the 2012 Rotterdam International Film Festival. Return to Burma altogether has been nominated for more than twenty awards.

== Plot ==
After working in Taiwan as a migrant construction worker, Shin-Hong decided to return to his hometown with his friend Ah-rong at Lashio, Myanmar for the Chinese New Year. A few days before the departure, Ah-rong died in a work accident, falling from a building at a construction site. Shin-Hong brought Ah-rong's ashes and condolence money from their compatriot workers back to their hometown in Myanmar.

Seen as a "returnee with honor," believed to have made a fortune in Taiwan, Shin-Hong was even invited to deliver a speech at a school's graduation ceremony, where he told a story to convey the message that “there is no free lunch.” He ended his speech with "soar high and fly far," a common blessing in Myanmar that encapsulates the longing of its people to strive and succeed in foreign lands. But Shin-Hong himself was already considering not going back to Taiwan.

Shin-Hong's long absence from his hometown created a subtle estrangement between him and the people there. During his stay, he paid visits to the families of Ah-rong and other workers. He also carefully checked the investment needed to start different kinds of businesses, while his hometown acquaintances still yearned to venture abroad for work with good pay just as his younger brother and a friend of his were heading to Malaysia for a job. After seeing his brother off, Shin-Hong was seen chopping wood on a piece of land with another young man.

== Production ==
Director Midi Z made Return to Burma realistically close to documentary from the perspective of a Myanmar Chinese. The film is mostly based on his own experiences. He takes the audience into the struggles and displacements of Myanmar society, presenting the changing Myanmar and the real conditions and life situations of its people. Growing up in Myanmar, Midi Z does not shy away from the issue of "poverty" in Myanmar. He believes that as an artist, especially as a director, it is the fundamental duty to confront these poverty or evil aspects. Obtaining licenses for filming in Myanmar is not easy, so Midi Z takes matters into his own hands and personally operates the camera to capture the shots for this film. The handheld camera's instability and the race against time create a unique atmosphere in his films.

Midi Z admitted that the inspiration for this film came from his own emotional experience when he returned to his hometown after ten years of absence. Through his personal insights, the film also captures the collective spirit of Myanmar during the transitional period of opening up and democratization, earning Midi Z the recognition as the successor to the tradition of realistic storytelling in Taiwanese cinema, as praised by programmers at the Vancouver International Film Festival.

In the movie, there is a scene where Shin-Hong brought two books of literature to a man he had not met in 12 years: Rabindranath Tagore's Selected Poems of Tagore and Gao Xingjian’s One Man’s Bible. The man is Midi Z’s real classmate in junior middle school, who was very talented in writing. The man became a teacher, had a wife and a child, and lived an ordinary life. He had no leisure to write poems after the birth of his child. To make a living in Myanmar left him no room for art. In an interview, Midi Z expresses his intention to identify what art is. He believes that the works of great authors are often born out of struggles or pain, as the blurb for One Man’s Bible read aloud by the teacher in the film.

The character Wang Hing-Hong’s name is actually the actor’s real name. He is also the executive producer of this film, Wang Fu-Ang. He actually had no interest in acting in the film. But Myanmar was too dangerous at the time of the film’s production; he could not find any actor who would risk his life, so he took the role.

== Music ==
Song	Lyrics by	Composor
Street Corner (街角)	Aung Win	Zaw Pan
Mother Nature (大自然母親)	Sai Ti Sai	
Lover's Fairy Tale (愛人的童話)	A-Luan	

Through their performances of popular songs, young Myanmar Chinese show their frustrations with their social identity, their desire for love, and their utopian projections for future life. In the film, Ah-hong and most other young men had no romantic relationship due to poverty. The song "Street Corner" and "Lover's Fairy Tale" together express the aspirations of the young people towards love.

== Honors ==
Year	Awards	Notes	Ref.
2011	Vancouver International Film Festival	selection	
2011	Busan International Film Festival	selection	
2011	Golden Horse Film Festival	selection	
2011	International Film Festival Rotterdam	competition	
2012	Taipei Film Festival	nominated	
