= Poor Folk (film) =

- Chinese: 窮人。榴槤。麻藥。偷渡客
- Hanyu Pinyin: qiongren, liulian, mayao, touduke
- Directed by: Midi Z
- Written by: Midi Z
- Starring: Wang Shin-Hong; Wu Ke-xi; Zhao De-Fu; Zheng Meng-Lan
- Cinematography: Midi Z
- Edited by: Lin Sheng-Wen; Midi Z
- Production companies: Seashore Image Productions; Flash Forward Entertainment; Montage Film
- Release dates: 2012 (festival); 19 April 2013 (Taiwan)
- Running time: 105 minutes
- Countries: Taiwan; Myanmar
- Languages: Yunnan Dialect (mixed with local diacet in Thailand hand and Myanmar)

Poor Folk is the second feature movie directed by Taiwanese director Midi Z, which is packed with Return to Burma (2011) and Ice Poison (2014) by the distributor as the director's "homecoming trilogy." The trilogy depicts the lives of illegal immigrants of Chinese ethnicity on the border of Myanmar. Midi Z completed Poor Folk in the same year after Return to Burma, which grabbed international attention in many film festivals. The film presents a realistic portrayal of the life of a handful of ethnic Chinese, who try to make a living at the Thai border by drug or human trafficking.

Poor Folk received sponsorship from the HBF Film Fund at the Rotterdam Film Festival and was selected by the International Film Festival Rotterdam, Busan International Film Festival, and Vancouver International Film Festival. It was the first Taiwanese film to be nominated for the Hawaii International Film Festival since Cape No. 7 (2008).

== Plot ==
Poor Folk tells the story of A-Hong, an ethnic Chinese who illegally crossed the border from Myanmar to the border town of Tai Gu in Thailand with his sister, who was sold to a human trafficking syndicate. A-Hong first worked as an assistant to A-Fu, a tour guide and the trafficker who brought A-Hong to Bangkok. However, when Bangkok was hit by floods and the tourist business turned bad, A-Hong and A-Fu were forced to return to Tai Gu to sell precursor chemicals. Since what they could lay hold on was “Su-li-ding” instead of “Ti-fei,” the common ingredient for making amphetamine, they had to find a new buyer, a gang leader who had no intention to pay up. A-Hong's sister on the other hand was smuggled to Tai Gu by Sun-Mei, a female trafficker who was promised Taiwan's ID for her work, which was never realized. She was so desperate and hopeless that she was broken into tears when drinking with other female friends, who could only try to comfort her by telling her that it was not that bad to stay in Tai Gu. A-Hong's sister kept trying to escape but was caught back every time. Finally A-Hong was reunited with her to see her off. He told her their mother had to sell her for the money she needed and asked her not to try to run again for her own good. He promised that he would redeem her as soon as he made enough money in Bangkok, a prospect which is as empty as what San Mei was promised.

== Cast ==
Character	Actor
A-hong (阿洪)	Wang Shin-Hong (王興洪)
Sun-Mei (三妹)	Wu Ke-Xi (吳可熙)
A-Fu (阿富)	Zhao De-Fu (趙德福)
A-Lan (阿蘭)	Zheng Meng-Lan (鄭夢蘭)

== Production ==
=== Pre-production ===
Poor Folk is based on a true story. When director Midi Z went to Thailand in 2008, he met a friend who had illegally crossed the border from Myanmar to Thailand. After arriving in Thailand, the friend's sister went missing and he had been searching for her. Eventually, he became addicted to drugs and lost his mind. The film is partially autobiographical. Midi Z also grew up in Myanmar and could easily cross the border to Thailand or China. Many of his relatives and friends chose to become illegal immigrants in Thailand to get a better life.

=== Casting ===
To meet director Midi Z's requirements for realism in the film, the male lead, Wang Shin-Hong, lived in Bangkok for several months and the female lead, Wu Ke-Xi, lived on the Myanmar border for two months before shooting. To get close to the character, she got tanned and learned to do housework as an underclass worker of the lower class. In a post-screening interview at the Kaohsiung Film Festival, Wu Kexi said, "Before filming, I went to Myanmar for a while. As a native Taiwanese, I didn't really feel anything about the border at first until the director gave me guidance and I watched many art films and documentaries on the topic. I also went to Huaxin Street (a Burmese community in Taipei) many times to learn their language and made friends with many Burmese people. But when I got there, my biggest challenge was how to act naturally, as the director had mentioned. Some of our scenes required rehearsal, and some were improvised, so filming there was quite exciting, as you never knew what would happen next."

=== Filming ===
Both Poor Folk and Return to Burma used the Thai-Myanmar border as an important filming location, where some Thai and Myanmar resistance forces were stationed at that time. Faced with such a filming environment, Midi Z chose to use a small camera as filming equipment and studied it repeatedly to minimize the impact of lighting on the film.

When filming the border scenes, the crew had to negotiate with the military guards and faced unexpected difficulties due to the particular location. In one scene, Wang Shin-Hong had to walk through an area filled with tall grass on the border. For example, after the director had the desired shot and called “cut!” Wang Shin-Hong was nowhere to be found. The crew's translator asked help from nearby soldiers and was told that the area was full of landmines and traps and was monitored by cameras. If he were mistaken for illegal immigrants by other soldiers, he could have been shot on sight. Fortunately Wang was safely found.

== Honor ==
Year	Awards	Notes
2012	Vancouver International Film Festival	selection
2012	Busan International Film Festival	selection
2012	Hawaii International Film Festival	competition
2012	Mumbai International Film Festival	selection
2013	International Film Festival Rotterdam	selection
