= Wang Yu-xuan =

Taiwanese actress (born 1999)

- 王渝萱
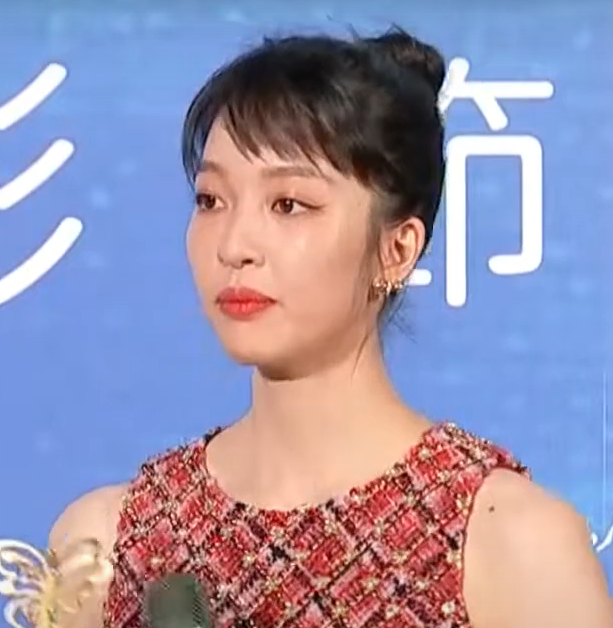
- Wang in July 2022
- Born: Wang Yu-xuan; 1999 (age 26–27); Taipei, Taiwan
- Education: Central Academy of Drama; Taipei National University of the Arts
- Occupation: Actress
- Years active: 2016–present
- Family: Wang Yu-ping (sister)

Wang Yu-xuan (Chinese: 王渝萱; born 1999) is a Taiwanese actress. She made her acting debut in Lou Yi-an's White Lies, Black Lies (2016) and gained prominence with a starring role in the PTS series On Children (2018), which earned her a nomination for Best Newcomer in the 54th Golden Bell Awards. She delivered her breakout performance in another Lou Yi-an film Goddamned Asura (2021), winning Best Supporting Actress in both the 58th Golden Horse Awards and the 24th Taipei Film Awards.

== Early life ==
Wang was born in 1999 in Taipei, Taiwan. She has an older sister Wang Yu-ping, who also pursued a career as an actress. Her mother worked at the National Sun Yat-sen Memorial Hall, and often brought Wang to watch stage plays since she was in kindergarten. She became intrigued by acting after watching the 2008 Japanese film Departures, and studied performing arts at Taipei Municipal Fuxing Senior High School. She also began attending casting auditions at the age of 15. Due to frequently taking leave for acting, she nearly failed to graduate high school. After graduation, Wang took two gap years to learn photography and work as a barista, but she found that she lacked interest in both fields. She moved to Beijing in 2019 to study directing at the Central Academy of Drama, but she quit and returned to Taiwan a year later due to the COVID-19 pandemic. She then enrolled at Taipei National University of the Arts to study film, and was in her third year as of August 2023.

== Career ==
At 15, Wang was recommended to director Lou Yi-an and made her acting debut as the younger version of Annie Chen's character in White Lies, Black Lies. In 2018, she was cast by the assistant director of the PTS series On Children at the age of 19, landing her first leading role as Liu Chiao-yi, a high school student who makes a deal with a peacock devil. This role earned her a nomination for Best Newcomer in a Miniseries in the 54th Golden Bell Awards. Following this performance, she appeared in the Netflix series Detention and Light the Night. After returning to Taiwan from Beijing, she was cast in another Lou Yi-an film Goddamned Asura as Zero, a schoolgirl and one of the six ensemble leads. Allan Hunter of Screen Daily described her as a "stand-out" among the cast, noting her ability to convey "the heartache beneath the sarcastic, rebellious persona"; while Lu Hao-ping of Global Views Monthly praised her portrayal as "both tough and fragile" and called her performance "eye-catching". Wang won both Best Supporting Actress in the 58th Golden Horse Awards and Best Supporting Actress in the 24th Taipei Film Awards for her role.

Wang also starred as the lead and titular character Blue, a high schooler who begins using dating apps after being dumped by her boyfriend, in the 2022 drama film Little Blue. She was invited to join the project by director Lee Yi-fang, who was impressed by Wang's performance in Goddamned Asura and changed the settings of the protagonist to fit Wang's traits. Estella Huang of Mirror Media commended Wang's casting, noting her ability to "capture the chaotic balance between love and lust" and "showcase details through her facial expressions and body language". Wang won Best Actress in the 4th Taipei Film Critics Society Awards and received a nomination for Best Actress in the 25th Taipei Film Awards for this performance. She also had a recurring role as a high school teacher and cult follower in the web series The Amazing Grace of Σ, and starred in the television film Do Not Go Gentle in Taipei, which earned her a nomination for Best Leading Actress in a Television Film in the 57th Golden Bell Awards.

In 2023, Wang took on another leading role as a sister trying to save her brother's (played by Patrick Shih) trapped soul in an AR game in the horror film The Bridge Curse: Ritual. In 2024, she landed a recurring role in the Netflix series Let's Talk About Chu as a university student involved in a sexual relationship with her professor portrayed by Umin Boya, and had a main role in the anthology series Urban Horror. She is set to appear as a rookie journalist in the upcoming journalism-themed thriller series Tabloid.

== Filmography ==
=== Film ===
Year	Title	Role	Notes/Ref.
2016	White Lies, Black Lies	Young Chuang Mei-yu (莊美玉)	
2021	Goddamned Asura	Zero (琳琳)	
2022	Little Blue	Blue (小藍)	
2023	The Bridge Curse: Ritual	Lien Yu-ting (連裕婷)	

=== Television ===
Year	Title	Role	Notes/Ref.
2018	On Children	Liu Chiao-yi (劉巧藝)	Main role
2020	Detention	Li Tzu-chi (李子琪)	Recurring role
2021	Light the Night	Mountain climbing student	Cameo
2021	Do Not Go Gentle in Taipei	Mimi (咪咪)	Main role; television film
2022	The Amazing Grace of Σ	Chang Hsiao-hsuen (張小璇)	Recurring role
2024	Let's Talk About Chu	An-ni (安倪)	Recurring role
2024	Urban Horror	Hsiao-chien (小倩)	Main role
2025	Tabloid	Lin Pei-ting (林姵亭)	Main role

== Awards and nominations ==
Year	Award	Category	Work	Result	Ref.
2019	54th Golden Bell Awards	Best Newcomer in a Miniseries or Television Film	On Children	Nominated	
2021	58th Golden Horse Awards	Best Supporting Actress	Goddamned Asura	Won	
2022	24th Taipei Film Awards	Best Supporting Actress	Goddamned Asura	Won	
2022	57th Golden Bell Awards	Best Leading Actress in a Miniseries or Television Film	Do Not Go Gentle in Taipei	Nominated	
2023	4th Taipei Film Critics Society Awards	Best Actress	Goddamned Asura	Nominated	
2023	4th Taipei Film Critics Society Awards	Best Actress	Little Blue	Won	
2023	25th Taipei Film Awards	Best Actress	Little Blue	Nominated	
