= Shenhai =

Shenhai may refer to:

- Blue Cha Cha (深海; Shēnhǎi), 2005 Taiwanese film directed by Chen Wen-tang
- Deep Sea (film) (深海; Shēnhǎi), 2023 Chinese animated film directed by Tian Xiaopeng
- G15 Shenyang–Haikou Expressway, also known as Shen-Hai Expressway
