= The Man Who Couldn't Leave =

Film directed by Singing Chen

The Man Who Couldn't Leave is a Taiwanese short film directed by Singing Chen in 2022. The film employs virtual reality (VR) techniques to depict the Rebellion Case on Green Island during the period of White Terror.

== Synopsis ==
The film was commissioned by the National Human Rights Museum. It primarily features 360-degree real scenes, including the exhibition area of the New Life Correction Center's Third Brigade at the Green Island White Terror Memorial Park. Some scenes were shot in studios by using virtual reality (VR) techniques. The story revolves around A-Kuen, a political victim, as the main character. It begins with a tour of the wax figure exhibition area in the New Life Correction Center, telling the experiences behind the wax figures in the dormitory. The story then unfolds through the letters between A-Cing, a fellow inmate who also suffered under the White Terror, and his family, narrating the ordeals faced by political victims of the White Terror.

== Production ==
This film is a single-user, 360-degree fully immersive experience that requires the use of VR headsets for viewing. Audience does not embody specific character roles but from a third-person perspective. Although interaction with the characters is not possible, the characters will talk to the audience directly according to events, creating a sense of face-to-face interaction. Viewers primarily engage with the narrative through visual and auditory senses, experiencing the story in a lifelike manner. The progression of the plot can be inferred based on the positioning of visuals or the direction of sound. Multiple scenes can unfold simultaneously from the front, sides, and below, allowing viewers to rotate, to get close, or to distance their perspective freely throughout the entire screening.

== Awards and exhibitions ==
The film received several awards in 2022, including the Best Experience Award in the Immersive Content Competition at the Venice Film Festival, selection for the DocLab VR Gallery section at the International Documentary Film Festival Amsterdam (IDFA), and the VR360 Narrative Award in the International Short Film Competition VR category at the Kaohsiung Film Festival (KFF). The following year, it won the SMART Competition Grand Prize at the International Documentary Festival (FIPADOC) in France, as well as the Photography Special Mention and Audience Award at the NewImages Festival.

In 2023, an exhibition with the same name, The Man Who Couldn't Leave, was held at the Museum of National Taipei University of Education. Additionally, the Taiwan Film and Audiovisual Institute organized a screening event, Virtual Reality Special Screening – 'The Man Who Couldn't Leave.'
