= 37th Golden Horse Awards =

Award ceremony for Chinese-language films of 1999 and 2000

- Date: December 2, 2000
- Site: Sun Yat-sen Memorial Hall, Taipei, Taiwan
- Hosted by: Matilda Tao, Stephen Fung and Nicky Wu
- Preshow hosts: Eric Moo and Phoenix Chang
- Organized by: Taipei Golden Horse Film Festival Executive Committee

Highlights
- Best Feature Film: Crouching Tiger, Hidden Dragon
- Best Director: Johnnie To; The Mission
- Best Actor: Francis Ng; The Mission
- Best Actress: Maggie Cheung; In the Mood for Love
- Most awards: Crouching Tiger, Hidden Dragon (6)
- Most nominations: Crouching Tiger, Hidden Dragon (13)

Television in Taiwan
- Channel: Much TV
- Ratings: 2.62% (average)

The 37th Golden Horse Awards (Mandarin: 第37屆金馬獎) took place on December 2, 2000 at the Sun Yat-sen Memorial Hall in Taipei, Taiwan.

== Winners and nominees ==
Winners are listed first and highlighted in boldface.

| **Best Feature Film**: **Crouching Tiger, Hidden Dragon**; In the Mood for Love; Shadow Magic; The Mission; The Cabbie; Little Cheung | **Best Short Film**: **Travel**; The Money That Kills; Voice of the Sunflower; One Yuan |
| **Best Documentary**: **Grandma's Hairpin**; Modeling Taiwan; The Team; Hai-Yin Wu and Her World of Taiwan Macaques | **Best Animation** - |
| **Best Director**: **Johnnie To — The Mission**; Ann Hu — Shadow Magic; Ang Lee — Crouching Tiger, Hidden Dragon; Wong Kar-wai — In the Mood for Love | **Best Leading Actor**: **Francis Ng — The Mission**; Chu Chung-heng — Pure Accident; Leslie Cheung — Double Tap; Tony Leung Chiu-wai — In the Mood for Love |
| **Best Leading Actress**: **Maggie Cheung — In the Mood for Love**; Zhang Ziyi — Crouching Tiger, Hidden Dragon; Michelle Yeoh — Crouching Tiger, Hidden Dragon; Sammi Cheng — Needing You... | **Best Supporting Actor**: **Tai Bo — The Cabbie**; Lam Suet — The Mission; Hsia Ching-ting — Hidden Whisper; Leon Dai — Feeling by Night |
| **Best Supporting Actress**: **Chao Mei-ling — Lament of the Sand River**; Cheng Hsiu-ying — The Cabbie; Hsiao Shu-shen — Pure Accident; Teresa Mo — And I Hate You So | **Best New Performer**: **Yiu Yuet-ming — Little Cheung**; Huang Yao-ning — Lament of the Sand River; Debbie Tam — Spacked Out; Yen Mu-tsuen — Bundled |
| **Audience Choice Award**: **Shadow Magic** | **Grand Jury Award**: **The Cabbie** |
| **Special Jury Award**: **Chang Chi-yung — Lament of the Sand River** | **Lifetime Achievement Award**: **Hsin Chi**; **Cheng Jin-chou** |
