= KFF =

KFF may refer to:

- Kazakhstan Football Federation
- King Faisal Foundation
- KFF (health policy organization)
- Kalmar FF, a Swedish football club
- Kenya Football Federation
- Kung Fu Factory, a video-game developer
- Kung Fu Films
- Kaohsiung Film Festival
