= Black tea (disambiguation) =

Black tea is a type of oxidized tea.

It may also refer to:

- Fermented tea, called "black tea" (黑茶) in China
- Yaupon tea, an American indigenous beverage called "black drink"
- Black Tea (film), a 2024 romantic drama film co-written and directed by Abderrahmane Sissako
