= Chan Tzu-hsuan =

Taiwanese actress (born 1997)

- 詹子萱
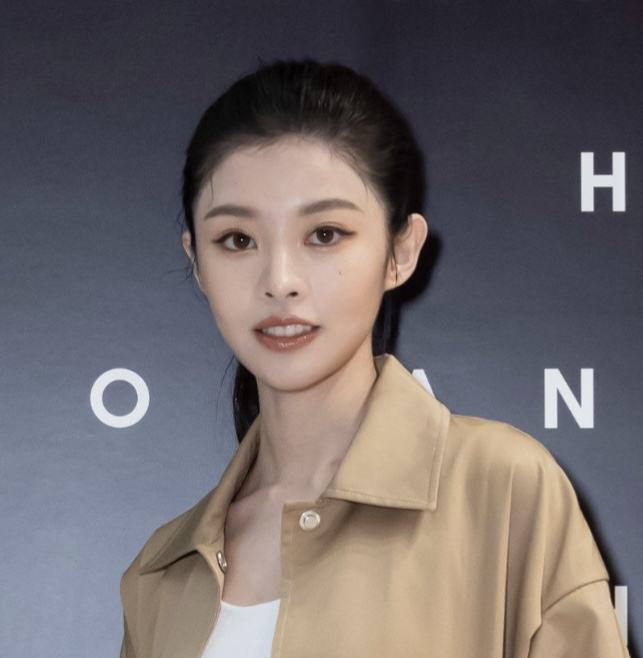
- Chan in September 2025
- Born: 16 July 1997 (age 29); Taoyuan, Taiwan
- Education: Jinwen University of Science and Technology (BBus)
- Occupation: Actress
- Years active: 2022–present

Chan Tzu-hsuan (Chinese: 詹子萱; born 16 July 1997) is a Taiwanese actress best known for her lead and titular role as Chu Ai in the Netflix series Let's Talk About Chu (2024), for which she won Best Newcomer in a Miniseries or Television Film in the 59th Golden Bell Awards.

== Early life and education ==
Chan was born on 16 July 1997 in Taoyuan, Taiwan. She developed an interest in becoming an actress at a young age and intended to study performing arts at Hwa Kang Arts School, but her parents objected, not wanting their daughter to move to Taipei and study abroad alone. While in high school, she discovered her passion for acting during a school project that involved parodying popular music videos. After graduating, she insisted on moving to Taipei and enrolled in Jinwen University of Science and Technology, where she studied international trade. In her third year, she began working part-time at a restaurant, where a colleague recommended her to a friend who owned a talent agency. Starting in 2019, Chan was invited to appear in advertisements and music videos, including Men Envy Children's "After Turn My Back" and Fool and Idiot's "Hoyde A". After graduating with a Bachelor of Business from Jinwen, Chan decided to pursue acting full-time and attended an 18-month acting workshop hosted by Zhou Xun and Shu Qi in Beijing, China, in 2020. During her time in Beijing, she was cast in a short film but was replaced before filming commenced. In 2022, she gained public attention for starring in the music video for Li Ronghao's "The Dark Plum Sauce".

== Career ==
Chan returned to Taiwan after receiving her first acting role as Wang Shih-yun, the girlfriend of Edward Chen's character, in the 2022 crime mystery film The Post-Truth World. She joined Ning Chang's talents agency in the same year. In 2023, she starred in the music videos for Hong Kong singer MC Cheung Tin-fu's "Inhale" and "Not My Problem", which earned her recognition in Hong Kong. She also secured a minor role in the horror film The Bridge Curse: Ritual that same year.

In 2024, Chan landed a lead and titular role as Chu Ai, a sex vlogger, in the Netflix sex comedy series Let's Talk About Chu. James Marsh of South China Morning Post praised her performance as "likeable" and convincing to the audience; while Chien Ying-jou described her performance as "refreshing" in her review for United Daily News, comparing it to Lily Collins in Emily in Paris. She won Best Newcomer in a Miniseries or Television Film in the 59th Golden Bell Awards, and named Top Talent by the Taipei Film Festival for her performance. She secured a lead role in the homosexual romance film A Balloon's Landing, and a recurring role as Ms. Pumpkin in the Netflix drama series Born for the Spotlight that year. Chan is set to appear in a lead role alongside Cheryl Yang in an upcoming mystery series.

== Filmography ==
=== Film ===
Year	Title	Role	Notes/Ref.
2022	The Post-Truth World	Wang Shih-yun (王詩云)	
2023	The Bridge Curse: Ritual	Hsiao Li (小莉)	
2024	A Balloon's Landing	Hsia Hsia (夏夏)	

=== Television ===
Year	Title	Role	Notes/Ref.
2024	Let's Talk About Chu	Chu Ai (邱曖)	Main role
2024	Born for the Spotlight	Ms. Pumpkin (南瓜小姐)	Recurring role
Miracles of the ER	Tang Hsi (唐希)	Recurring role	

== Awards and nominations ==
Year	Award	Category	Work	Result	Ref.
2024	59th Golden Bell Awards	Best Newcomer in a Miniseries or Television Film	Let's Talk About Chu	Won	
