= Singing Chen =

Taiwanese film director

Singing Chen (born in 1974) is a Taiwanese film director, documentary filmmaker, and music composer. She graduated from Advertising in the Department of Mass Communication at Fu Jen Catholic University in 1997. Her works primarily focus on topics related to humanities and arts and culture, and she uses a magical realism approach to establish her visual style. She has received numerous international and domestic awards nominations for her work.

== Career ==
Chen joined Huang Ming-chuan's workshop as an intern in her university time. After procuring short film production subsidy from the Taiwanese government, Chen start her life as a director. Her first 16mm feature film, Bundled, released in 2000, was the winner of Best Drama and Most Promising Director of the Year at Taipei Film Festival, and was nominated for Best New Performer and Best Original Film Song at Golden Horse Award in 2000. In this film, Chen worked as the director, script writer and helped with the film score. The film depicts the lives and psychological states of a group of homeless people. Although their reasons for becoming homeless are different, they all resist the norms of family and society and insist on living on the margins of life. The film won the Best Film award at the Taipei Film Festival in 2000.

In the same year, Chen made Who is Fishing (2000), a documentary that uses a newsreel style with animation and documentary footage to explore various aspects of the Diaoyu Islands dispute.

In 2007, Chen’s feature film God, Man, Dog was selected in The Forum at the Berlin International Film Festival and was invited to more than 30 film festivals, including Busan International Film Festival. The film explores the relationships between class, religion, and people in a consumer society through three different characters and their life stories. The film was selected in The Forum at the Berlin International Film Festival and won the Tagesspiegel Readers’ Jury Award.

In addition to feature films, documentaries, and short films, Chen has also ventured into the VR field. In 2018, she was invited by the Kaohsiung Film Festival VR Film Lab to present her first VR experimental work, Afterimage of Tomorrow. She co-created with choreographer Chou Shu-yi and featured 11 dancers, who used body language to express sensory memories of life that are difficult to describe in words. The 18-minute experimental work explores how VR technology creates overlaps between vision and perception and expresses emotions towards things that are fading away.

In 2021, Chen co-wrote the script of Goddamned ASURA (2021), directed by Lou Yi-An, who was Chen's university classmate. The film was nominated three awards in Golden Horse Award and won the Best Screenplay in Taipei Film Festival. Then, Chen served as the editor, director, producer, and editor for the drama series Heaven on the Fourth Floor. The series received widespread acclaim in Taiwan and was praised for its healing and slow-paced style. At the 57th Golden Bell Awards in 2022, it was nominated for five awards in the drama category, including Best Writing, Best Actress, Best Supporting Actor, Best Supporting Actress, and Best Program Editing. The female leading actor Hsieh Ying-xuan won Best Actress.

In September 2022, Chen released her second VR short film, The Man Who Couldn’t Leave, which won the Best Experience award in the Venice Immersive Competition section at the 79th Venice Film Festival, which is the highest honor in that section. The film was supported by National Human Rights Museum, integrating the firsthand experiences of many victims of the White Terror era in Taiwan and uses an undelivered letter as its theme to recreate the elegy of the era under authoritarian rule.

As of 2023, Chen is preparing for her fantasy feature, Shu Jen (樹人; Tree Man), which explores ecological and environmental issues. The script has been nominated for the Excellent Screenplay Award at the 40th Golden Harvest Awards.

== Filmography ==
Feature Film
Year	Chinese title	English title	Note	Ref.
1995	微醺		No official English tile, literal meaning: ‘slightly drunk’	
1995	阿春		No official English tile, literal meaning: ‘A-chun’	
2000	我叫阿銘啦	Bundled		
2001	空中花園	A Garden in the Sky		
2003	終身大事	Great Thing in One’s Life		
2008	流浪神狗人	God Man Dog		
2021	該死的阿修羅	Goddamned ASURA	co-wrote the script with Lou Yi-an	

Documentary
Year	Chinese title	English title	Note	Ref.
1997	李伯大夢		No official English tile, literal meaning: ‘uncle Lee’s dream’	
2000	誰來釣魚？	Who is Fishing?		
2008	穴居人		No official English tile, literal meaning: ‘Men who live in caves’	
2009	如果耳朵有開關	Ears Switched off and on		
2014	行者	The Walkers		
2016	山靈	Mountain Spirits		
2018	大帳篷-想像力的避難所	The Moving Tent		
2018	恍惚與凝視的練習	In Trance We Gaze		

Short Film
Year	Chinese title	English title	Note
2007	水岸麗景	Waterfront Villa Bonita	
2012	昨日的記憶：阿霞的掛鐘	When Yesterday Comes: The Clock	
2013	台北工廠I：豬	Taipei Factory I: The Pig	
2015	好好吃飯	A Real Meal	
2015	來得及說再見	Ways into Love	

VR Film
Year	Chinese title	English title	Note	Ref.
2018	留給未來的殘影	Afterimage of Tomorrow		
2022	無法離開的人	The Man Who Couldn’t Leave		

TV series
Year	Chinese title	English title	Note
2021	四樓的天堂	Heaven on the 4th Floor	

== Awards and honors ==
Year	Award	Category	Work	Outcome	Ref.
2000	Taipei Film Festival	Best Drama	Bundled	Won	
2000	Taipei Film Festival	Most Promising Director of the Year	Bundled	Won	
2007	Golden Horse Awards	Best Original Screenplay	God Man Dog	Nominated	
2007	Golden Horse Awards	Best Film Editing	God Man Dog	Nominated	
2012	Kaohsiung Film Festival	Best Selection for International Short Film Competition	The Clock	Won	
2013	Kaohsiung Film Festival	Best Selection for International Short Film Competition	The Pig	Won	
2014	Taiwan International Documentary Festival	Audience Award	The Walkers	Won	
2014	Golden Horse Awards	Best Documentary	The Walkers	Nominated	
2021	Golden Horse Awards	Best Original Screenplay	Goddamned ASURA	Won	
2022	Taipei Film Festival	Best Screenplay	Goddamned ASURA	Won	
2022	Taipei Film Festival	Best Music	Goddamned ASURA	Won	
2022	Golden Bell Awards	Best Editing for a Drama Series	Heaven on the 4th Floor	Nominated	
2022	Golden Bell Awards	Best Writing for a Television Series	Heaven on the 4th Floor	Nominated	
2022	Venice Film Festival	Best Experience for Venice Immersive Competition	The Man Who Couldn’t Leave	Won	
2023	NewImages Festival	Special Cinematographic Distinction	The Man Who Couldn’t Leave	Won	
