= The Road to Mandalay (2016 film) =

2016 film

- Film poster
- Chinese: 再見瓦城
- Hanyu Pinyin: Zài Jiàn Wǎ Chéng
- Directed by: Midi Z
- Written by: Midi Z
- Produced by: Patrick Mao Huang; Midi Z
- Starring: Kai Ko; Wu Ke-xi
- Cinematography: Tom Fan
- Edited by: Matthieu Laclau
- Music by: Lim Giong
- Distributed by: Vie Vision Pictures
- Release dates: 5 September 2016 (Venice); 9 December 2016 (Taiwan)
- Running time: 108 minutes
- Countries: Taiwan; Myanmar; France; Germany
- Languages: Southwestern Mandarin; Burmese; Thai
- Box office: NT$7.1 million

The Road to Mandalay is a 2016 internationally co-produced drama film directed by Midi Z. The film premiered at the 73rd edition of the Venice Film Festival in the Venice Days section, in which it was awarded the Fedeora Award for Best Film. It was also screened in the Contemporary World Cinema section at the 2016 Toronto International Film Festival.

== Plot ==
A young Burmese girl, Lien Ching (Wu Ke-xi), smuggles herself in a truck heading for Bangkok, Thailand, aiming to pursue a better life, and eventually even go to Taiwan for better opportunities. In Bangkok she meets A-kuo (Kai Ko), a boy from the same Burmese hometown Lashio, who was less ambitious but pragmatic and had a crush on her.

Lacking proper identification, Liang struggles to find legitimate work and gets arrested as an illegal immigrant by the Thai authorities. She is fined and has to rely on A-kuo's help. Lien Ching becomes desperate to obtain legal paperwork, even if it is fraudulent.

After several failed attempts on the papers and losing money, she finally accepts a solution offered by a drug dealer who requires a huge sum of money. In order to collect the amount, Lien Ching prostitutes herself. This act enrages A-kuo, who has been supporting her.

Lien Ching makes enough money to gain passage into Taiwan, while A-kuo remains behind. One night shortly before her planned departure, A-kuo jealously murders Lien Ching, and then himself.

== Cast ==
- Kai Ko as A-kuo
- Wu Ke-xi as Lien Ching

== Awards and nominations ==
Award ceremony	Category	Recipients	Result	Ref
53rd Golden Horse Awards	Best Feature Film	The Road to Mandalay	Nominated	
53rd Golden Horse Awards	Best Director	Midi Z	Nominated	
53rd Golden Horse Awards	Best Leading Actor	Kai Ko	Nominated	
53rd Golden Horse Awards	Best Leading Actress	Wu Ke-xi	Nominated	
53rd Golden Horse Awards	Best Original Screenplay	Midi Z	Nominated	
53rd Golden Horse Awards	Best Art Direction	Akekarat Homlaor	Nominated	
36th Hong Kong Film Awards	Best Film from Mainland and Taiwan	The Road to Mandalay	Nominated	
19th Taipei Film Awards	Press Award	The Road to Mandalay	Won	
73rd Venice International Film Festival	Fedeora Award for Best Film	The Road to Mandalay	Won	
Youth Film Handbook Awards	Male Actor of the Year	Kai Ko	Won	
58th Asia-Pacific Film Festival	Best Film	The Road to Mandalay	Nominated	
58th Asia-Pacific Film Festival	Best Director	Midi Z	Won	
58th Asia-Pacific Film Festival	Best Actor	Kai Ko	Nominated	
58th Asia-Pacific Film Festival	Best Actress	Wu Ke-xi	Nominated	
58th Asia-Pacific Film Festival	Best Screenplay	Midi Z	Nominated	
58th Asia-Pacific Film Festival	Best Cinematography	Tom Fan	Nominated	
58th Asia-Pacific Film Festival	Best Editing	Matthieu Laclau	Nominated	
58th Asia-Pacific Film Festival	Best Art Direction	Akekarat Homlaor	Nominated	
