= Wu Ke-xi =

Taiwanese actress

Wu Ke-Xi
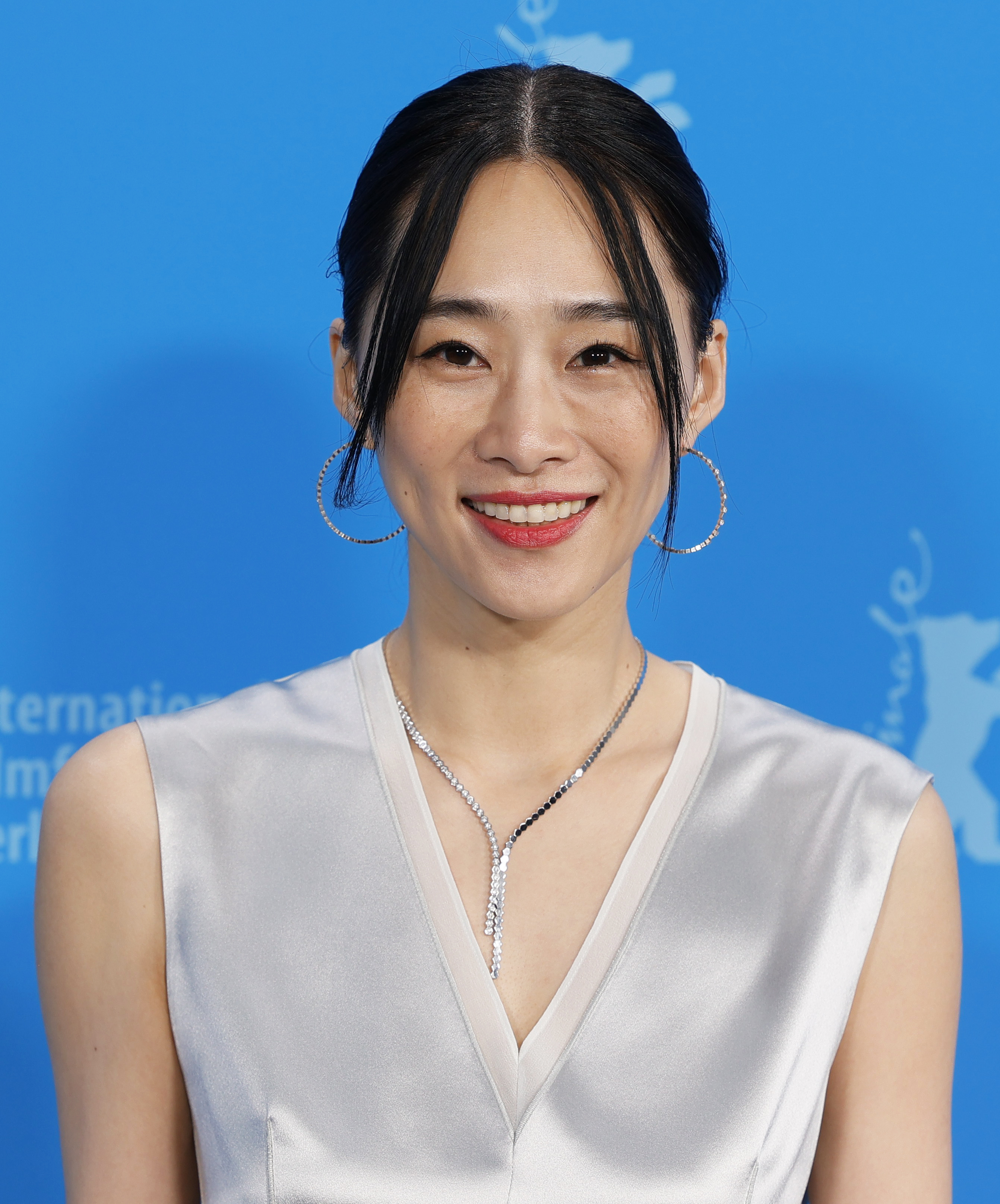
- Wu in 2024
- Born: 6 February 1983 (age 43); Taipei, Taiwan
- Education: Bachelor's Degree in Turkish Language
- Alma mater: National Chengchi University
- Occupations: Actress; screenwriter
- Years active: 2004–present
- Agent: Creative Artists Agency

Chinese name
- Chinese: 吳可熙
Transcriptions
Standard Mandarin
- Hanyu Pinyin: Wú KěXī

Wu Ke-Xi (born 6 February 1983) is a Taiwanese actress. She has had starring roles in most of Midi Z's films. In 2016, Wu was nominated for the Golden Horse Award for Best Leading Actress for her role in The Road to Mandalay.

== Life and career ==
Wu received her bachelor's degree in Turkish language and culture at National Chengchi University. Besides English and Turkish, she also learned Burmese, Thai and Southwestern Mandarin for her performances as Sino-Burmese characters in several Midi Z's films.

== Filmography ==
=== Feature film ===
Year	English title	Original title	Role	Notes/Ref.
2012	Poor Folk	窮人。榴槤。麻藥。偷渡客	San-mei	
2013	Taipei Factory	台北工廠	Burmese refugee	Segment "Silent Asylum"
2014	Ice Poison	冰毒	San-mei	
2016	Two Idiots	傻瓜向錢衝	Monica	
2016	The Road to Mandalay	再見瓦城	Lien Ching	
2017	The Bold, the Corrupt, and the Beautiful	血觀音	Tang Ning	
2018	5×1		Actress	VR film (segment "The Making of")
2019	Nina Wu	灼人秘密	Nina Wu	Also as screenwriter
2022	Redeeming Love		Mai Ling	
2024	Black Tea		Ying	Nominated - 74th Berlin International Film Festival - Golden Bear
TBA	The Exiles		TBA	Also as screenwriter

=== Short film ===
Year	English title	Original title	Role	Notes
2010	Solitary-ism	一個人主義	Girl	
2010	It All Comes Too Late	—N/a	Patty Wu	
2014	Burial Clothes	南方來信-安老衣	San-mei	
2014	The Palace on the Sea	海上皇宮	San-mei	
2015	Soulik	蘇力	The girlfriend	
2015	Jump Off Or Live On	跳下去，活下來	Chang Hsin-ju	
2018	Magician on the Roof	天台上的魔術師	Sung Ying	

=== Telefilm ===
Year	English title	Original title	Role	Notes
2009	Fireworks	煙花時分	Woman	
2011	One Step is Enough	出走的好理由	Hsiao-mi	

=== Television series ===
Year	English title	Original title	Role	Notes
2010	Days We Stared at the Sun	他們在畢業的前一天爆炸	Bar proprietress	

== Theater ==
Year	English title	Original title
2004	Scenes From A Marriage	婚姻場景
2004	Hamlet	哈姆雷特
2006	Listen to the Summer Wind	聽見夏天的風
2007	Road Kill	攔截公路
2007	Little Prince	小王子
2007	After She's Gone	離家後
2007	Zi Ran Xi Ti	自然習題
2008	Copenhagen	哥本哈根
2008	Lost and Found	失物招領
2009	Calmi Cuori Appassionati	冷靜與熱情之間
2009	7 Stories	七個故事
2010	The Vagina Monologues	陰道獨白
2010	Apartment 3A	—N/a

== Awards and nominations ==
Year	Award	Category	Nominated work	Result
2014	2nd Canada International Film and Television Festival	Best Actress	Ice Poison	Won
2015	Short Shorts Film Festival & Asia	Best Actress	The Palace on the Sea	Won
2015	15th Chinese Film Media Awards	Best Actress	Ice Poison	Nominated
2016	53rd Golden Horse Awards	Best Leading Actress	The Road to Mandalay	Nominated
2018	58th Asia-Pacific Film Festival	Best Actress	The Road to Mandalay	Nominated
2018	18th Chinese Film Media Awards	Best Supporting Actress	The Bold, the Corrupt, and the Beautiful	Nominated
2019	56th Golden Horse Awards	Best Original Screenplay	Nina Wu (share with Midi Z)	Nominated
2020	22nd Taipei Film Awards	Best Screenplay	Nina Wu (share with Midi Z)	Nominated
