= God Man Dog =

- Film poster
- Chinese: 流浪神狗人
- Hanyu Pinyin: liulang shen gou ren
- Directed by: Singing Chen
- Written by: Singing Chen; Lou Yi-an
- Produced by: Yeh Ju-fen
- Starring: Jack Kao; Tarcy Su; Chang Han; Jonathan Chang
- Cinematography: Shen Keshang
- Edited by: Singing Chen; Liao Ching-sung; Chen Xiaodong
- Music by: Hiromichi Sakamoto
- Distributed by: Ocean Deep Films
- Release dates: 2007 (Busan); 19 March 2008 (Taiwan)
- Running time: 119
- Country: Taiwan
- Language: Mandarin

God Man Dog is a 2007 Taiwanese road movie directed by director Singing Chen, starring Jack Kao, Tarcy Su, Chang Han and Jonathan Chang. It depicts the occasionally intertwining lives of three groups of characters of different social backgrounds to provide a comprehensive picture of the contemporary society of Taiwan.

God Man Dog has received widespread acclaim since its release and has participated in various international film festivals, including the Golden Horse Awards, Busan International Film Festival, and the Youth Forum section of the 2008 Berlin International Film Festival. It was nominated for three major awards, Best Screenplay, Best Editing, and Best Art Direction, at the 44th Golden Horse Awards.

The three groups of characters in the film belong to three distinct social classes, a middle-class couple, an indigenous family, and a handicapped man, who rescues discarded divine statuettes of all sorts. The film portrays how they experience varying trials and pains due to the material or spiritual deficiencies caused by consumerism, and develop drastically different attitudes towards life, which in a way reflects Singing Chen’s observations and thoughts on contemporary Taiwan.

The Chinese title of the film expresses the notion that gods and humans are no different from stray dogs in the consumerist era, while its English title employs a rhetorical device of palindrome, where the beginning of the title "God" is the reverse of the end "Dog," and vice versa.

== Plot ==
God Man Dog deals with many issues such as ethnicity, race, gender, class, and religion with its multiple plot lines to show the intricate connection between all beings (god, man, dog) and the unpredictability nature of life. Qing, a hand model, suffers from postpartum depression after her newborn baby was dead and seeks to find inner peace in Christianity, which frustrates her husband A-xiong, a busy architect. A-xiong finds it harder and harder to communicate with Qing and their marriage is on the verge of collapsing. The indigenous couple Biung and his wife have a pickup truck and deliver goods for a living. Biung has an alcoholism problem, which caused his boxer teenage daughter Savi to stay away from home. While Biung is trying hard to quit drinking, Savi helps her best friend, who wants to get a boob job, to pose as prostitutes to rob the male clients. Yellow Bull, who tries to save enough money to replace his old prosthetic leg, drives a truck carrying a Bodhisattva statue and other gods for religious events held by temples all over the island. He also feeds stray dogs and rescues discarded statuettes of deities. On his way to Yi-lan for the gate opening event for hungry ghosts the next day, he met Xian, a wandering teenager, and Savi, who was going home, and let them have a ride. On the same day on the mountain highway, while A-xiong and Qing were quarreling in the car on their way back to Taipei and Biung and his wife joyfully discuss a better future with a truckful of peaches to be delivered, a lost expensive puppy suddenly ran across the road and caused a deadly car accident. Having the habit of drinking, Biung was suspected to be responsible for the crash killing five people. Shocked and quietly driving behind Yellow Bull’s truck facing the serene Bodhisattva, A-xiong and Qing were able to come out of their despondency and make up. Biung on the other hand got himself drunk again and left home with a bottle of gasoline intending to commit suicide in the mountain. The sight of Yellow Bull’s shining Bodhisattva on the truck, which was out of gasoline due to the car accident, struck Biung as a sign of divine intervention and gave up his suicide plan. Yellow Bull did not get help in the mountain, instead he found many of those expensive peaches Biung failed to deliver scattered on the car crash site. Although the delay cost Yellow Bull dearly and would not be able to make enough money for his new prosthetic leg, he still considered himself lucky to have those peaches to share with Xian.

== Cast ==
Actor	Character
Jack Kao (高捷)	Yellow Bull (牛角)
Tarcy Su (蘇慧倫)	Ching (青青)
Chang Han (張翰)	A-xiong (阿雄)
Tu Xiao-han (杜曉寒)	Savi (莎薇)
Jonathan Chang (張洋洋)	Xian (阿仙)
Alice Ko (柯佳嬿)	CF Actress

== Production ==
According to director and screenwriter Singing Chen, the story of God Man Dog originally started with two separate scripts: one about urban middle-class life and the other about marginalized people. It took her about five years to consolidate the script. She discovered that the two separate stories asked about the same question: what could one do when his or her heart is wandering and cannot find a place to latch on. Therefore, she merged the two stories into one script to explore the structural issues of the society.

Regarding the religion depicted in the film, Singing Chen says that religion is supposed to help people pacify their minds and find the right path. But she finds that oftentimes religion becomes restriction. Before making the film, she used to work with Taiwanese director Huang Ming-chuan for a long time, traveling around Taiwan to film various documentaries, and encountered many temples and statues of god abandoned by worshipers. She even saw large statues that were defective production were then discarded on the roadside with missing heads or hands. And God Man Dog combines these ideas together.

In addition to directing, writing, and editing this film, Singing Chen also specifically participated in producing the music for the yoga music composer in the movie.

== Awards and honors ==
Year	Award	Category	Result	Ref.
2007	Busan International Film Festival	New Currents	Nominated	
2007	The Golden Horse Awards	Best Original Screenplay	Nominated	
2007	The Golden Horse Awards	Best Film Editing	Nominated	
2007	The Golden Horse Awards	Best Art Direction	Nominated	
2008	Taipei Film Festival	Fiction Feature	Nominated	
2008	Asian Film Awards	Best Actor: Jack Kao	Nominated	
2008	Fribourg International Film Festival	E-Changer Award	Won	
2008	Berlin International Film Festival	Tagesspiegel Readers’ Jury Award	Won	

== Critical reception ==
In 2007, God Man Dog participated in the Vancouver International Film Festival and the 12th Busan International Film Festival, where it was selected for the "New Currents."

At the 44th The Golden Horse Awards, the film was nominated for "Best Original Screenplay" and Singing Chen and Huang Meiqing for "Best Film Editing" and "Best Art Direction," respectively.

In 2008, the film competed in the official competition section of the Fribourg International Film Festival in Switzerland. It was nominated for the Berlin Film Festival, and was selected for the "Best Film" by the Berlin Daily Mirror. In the Asian Film Awards, Jack Kao was nominated for "Best Actor." It received the recognition of the "E-Changer Award" at the Fribourg International Film Festival in Switzerland, and was awarded 5,000 Swiss francs.

Huang Ming-chuan recalled that once while shooting a funeral procession in Chiayi, the gods on every truck were different. Singing Chen, seeing this scene for the first time, was quite shocked and perhaps it also opened up her creative thinking.
