= Miracles of the ER =

2026 Taiwanese medical drama television series

- 急診室的奇蹟
- Genre: Medical drama
- Written by: Huang Ching-tsu; Dong Ze; Lin Yun-shan
- Directed by: Isaac Li; Huang Ching-tsu
- Starring: Wallace Huo; Cheryl Yang; Kent Tsai; Chan Tzu-hsuan; Peng Cian-You
- Country of origin: Taiwan
- Original languages: Taiwanese Mandarin, Taiwanese Hokkien
- No. of seasons: 1
- No. of episodes: 8

Production
- Producer: Jade Lee
- Production company: Dare Entertainment Inc.

Original release
- Network: Netflix
- Release: November 12, 2026 – present

Miracles of the ER is a Taiwanese medical drama series that aired in 2026. Adapted from the medical novel of the same name by Su Yu, the series stars Wallace Huo, Cheryl Yang, Kent Tsai, Chan Tzu-hsuan, and Peng Cian-You. The series is the country's first-ever emergency department medical drama.

== Actors ==
Actor	Role	Description
Wallace Huo	Chou Cheng-chun	Associate Director of Emergency Medicine at Yang-Da University Hospital
Cheryl Yang	He Yu-hua	Senior emergency attending physician
Kent Tsai	Lin Geng-ming	First-year emergency resident
Chan Tzu-hsuan	Tang Hsi	First-year emergency resident
Payne Peng	Chiang Tung-yen	First-year emergency resident

== Production ==
This series is adapted from the novel of the same name by Su Yu; the project was selected for the 2022 "Taipei Golden Horse Film Project Promotion". It is directed by Li Chih-chiang, written by Huang Ching-tsu, and produced by Liang-Yuh Jade Lee.

Li Chih-chiang noted that emergency rooms encompass a diverse range of urgent medical scenarios, where life-or-death outcomes often hinge on split-second decisions, touching upon the value of life and various social issues. Screenwriter Huang Ching-tsu shared that he was initially unfamiliar with the medical field and even doubted his own capability for the task. However, as his father frequently visited the hospital, he began to understand the human experiences within the emergency room and contemplated how to transform these real-life stories into dramatic content.

Because real-world hospital emergency rooms involve active medical operations and patient privacy, they are generally unsuitable for filming. Consequently, the production team opted to construct their own set: a full-scale emergency room spanning approximately 1,320 m^{2} (14,200 sq ft) at the Tainan Film Studio. Authentic medical equipment was utilized to create a realistic clinical environment. More than three months prior to the start of filming, the production team assembled a consulting group of physicians and nurses to provide intensive training for the cast. The actors first observed operations in actual emergency rooms to understand workflows and basic first-aid knowledge; subsequently, based on their specific character profiles, they received training in medical procedures, fundamental medical concepts, and surgical techniques. In addition, the production team set up an emergency care area in Linkou equipped with medical supplies. Medical consultants guided the actors through blocking and rehearsals, while repeated video recordings were used to verify the details of their movements.

== Release ==
News of the series' production was announced in January 2026. On November 10, 2026, the first two episodes premiered at the Taipei Golden Horse Film Festival. The series consists of 8 episodes and was released on Netflix on November 12, 2026.
