= Blue Cha Cha =

- DVD cover
- Chinese: 深海
- Directed by: Cheng Wen-tang
- Written by: Cheng Ching-Feng; Cheng Wen-tang
- Produced by: Huang Hao-Jie; Yang Chi-Yung
- Starring: Tarcy Su; Lu Yi-ching
- Cinematography: Lin Cheng-Ying
- Edited by: Lei Chen-ching
- Music by: Lee Cincin
- Production company: Green Light Film
- Release date: 2005
- Running time: 107 minutes
- Country: Taiwan
- Language: Standard Chinese

Blue Cha Cha (Chinese: Shēn hǎi, 深海) is a 2005 Taiwanese film directed by Cheng Wen-tang. It was Taiwan's submission to the 79th Academy Awards for the Academy Award for Best Foreign Language Film, but was not accepted as a nominee.

== Synopsis ==
Blue Cha Cha depicts Ah Yu (Tarcy Su), a woman in her thirties who has just been released from prison. She stays with an older woman, An An (Lu Yi-ching), the proprietor of a girlie bar in the port town of Kaohsiung, and attempts to form relationships with two men, businessman Chen Sang (Leon Dai) and factory worker Hao (Wei Lee). An encounter with the Lao Yao autistic puppeteer helps them understand their feelings.

== Cast ==
- Tarcy Su
- Lu Yi-ching
- Leon Dai
- Wei Lee

== Release and reception ==
The film did the rounds of the European film festival circuit, screening at the 2006 International Film Festival Rotterdam, the 2006 Karlovy Vary International Film Festival, and the 33rd Brussels International Independent Film Festival where it won the festival's Grand Prize. In 2016, ten years after its release, the film screened as part of the Kaohsiung Film Festival.

Actress Lu Yi-ching won the award for Best Supporting Actress for her performance in the film at the 51st Asia-Pacific Film Festival in 2006. She was also nominated for Best Supporting Actress at the 42nd Golden Horse Awards in 2005 but lost to Yuen Qiu for Kung Fu Hustle. At the same awards, the film's composer Cincin Lee won the Best Original Film Score award for the original soundtrack.

== See also ==
- Cinema of Taiwan
- List of submissions to the 79th Academy Awards for Best Foreign Language Film
