= Golden Bell Award for Best Newcomer in a Miniseries or Television Film =

Award for new performers in a miniseries or television film

- Awarded for: Best Newcomer in a Miniseries or Television Film
- Location: Taiwan
- Presented by: Bureau of Audiovisual and Music Industry Development
- First award: 2016
- Currently held by: Chan Tzu-hsuan for Let's Talk About Chu (2024)
- Website: gba.tavis.tw

The Golden Bell Award for Best Newcomer in a Miniseries or Television Film (Chinese: 電視金鐘獎迷你劇集（電視電影）最具潛力新人獎; pinyin: Diànshì jīn zhōng jiǎng mínǐ jù jí (diànshì diànyǐng) zuì jù qiánlì xīnrén jiǎng) is one of the categories of the competition for Taiwanese television production, Golden Bell Awards. It has been awarded since 2016.

== Winners ==
=== 2020s ===
| Year | Winner | English title | Original title | Ref |
|---|---|---|---|---|
| 2020; 55th Golden Bell Awards | Bai Xiao-ying | Til Death Do Us Part | 住戶公約第一條 | |
| 2021; 56th Golden Bell Awards | Yu Chia-hsuan | No Flowers or Seasons | 家庭式 | |
| 2022; 57th Golden Bell Awards | Louis Chiang | The Love's Outlet | 愛的奧特萊斯 | |
| 2023; 58th Golden Bell Awards | Charlize Lamb | Shards of Her | 她和她的她 | |
| 2024; 59th Golden Bell Awards | Chan Tzu-hsuan | Let's Talk About Chu | 愛愛內含光 | |
