= The Exiles (upcoming film) =

- Directed by: Midi Z
- Written by: Midi Z; Wu Ke-xi
- Produced by: Anita Gou; Tom Heller; Claudia Tseng; Midi Z
- Starring: Sam Worthington; David Duchovny; Wu Ke-xi
- Cinematography: Edward Lachman
- Edited by: Hank Corwin
- Music by: Lim Giong
- Production companies: Killer Films; Taiwan Creative Content Agency
- Countries: United States; Taiwan
- Language: English

The Exiles is an upcoming crime thriller film co-written, directed and produced by Midi Z in his English-language debut. It stars Sam Worthington, David Duchovny, and Wu Ke-xi.

== Cast ==
- Sam Worthington
- David Duchovny
- Wu Ke-xi

== Production ==
In January 2026, it was reported that Taiwanese director Midi Z would be directing his English-language debut film, and co-write the script with Wu Ke-xi. Sam Worthington, David Duchovny, and Wu star. Principal photography began in late January 2026, in Taipei, with Edward Lachman serving as the cinematographer, and Hank Corwin as the editor.

=== Music ===
Lim Giong had composed the score for the film.
