= Tarcy Su =

Taiwanese singer and actress (born 1970)

Tarcy Su 蘇慧倫
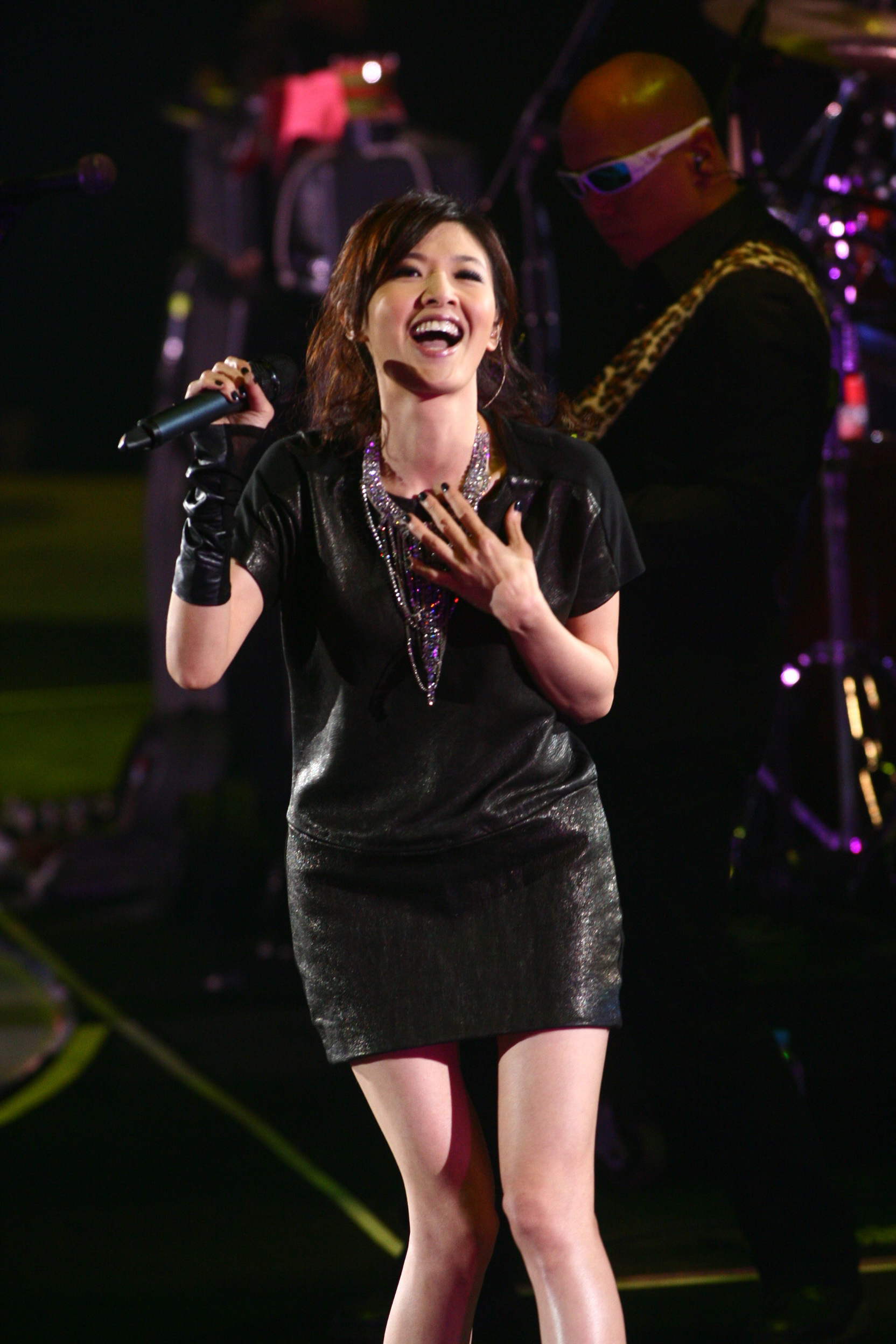
- Su in 2010
- Born: Su Huilun; 27 October 1970 (age 56); Taipei, Taiwan
- Occupations: Singer; actress
- Spouse: Jimmy Sun (m. 2014)
- Children: 1
- Musical career
- Genre: Pop
- Instrument: Vocals
- Years active: 1989–present
- Labels: Zhuque / Rock Records (1990–3); Rock Records (1994–2002); Shanghua / Universal Music (2005–2007） B'in Music (2019-)

Tarcy Su (Chinese: 蘇慧倫; pinyin: Sū Huìlún; Pe̍h-ōe-jī: So͘ Hūi-lûn; born 27 October 1970) is a Taiwanese singer and actress who was most popular in the 1990s during her recording career with Rock Records. She has released three albums since 2002. In 2021, she was nominated for Best Female Mandarin Singer in the 32nd Golden Melody Awards for her rendition in Every Side of Me.

Her first album was released in 1990, when she was 20 years old. Her albums were primarily in Mandarin, although she had three Cantonese solo albums to her name.

== Career ==
Su's debut album was first released in early 1990. It was a resounding success, leading to a second album in November that year. Her first five albums were produced by Zhuque (朱雀文化製作) and released by Rock Records. From 1994 to 2002, she was exclusively a Rock Records artiste.

Her most popular albums were: Lemon Tree (1996), where she sang a Mandarin cover of the song by Fool's Garden (a Cantonese cover is available on her Cantonese solo album); Duck (1996), where she covered a pop song by South Korean band JuJu Club; and The Fool (1997), where the title track was composed by Singaporean group Padres.

In 2002, Su was released from her contract with Rock Records. She went on to act in several films and TV series. She later signed a contract with Shanghua Records, a subsidiary company under Universal Music, and released two solo Mandarin albums under Universal. In 2020, Su released her sixteenth Mandarin album, Every Side of Me, under her new company B'in Music.

== Personal life ==
She married her boyfriend of two years, Jimmy Sun (孫益民), who has a 7-year-old daughter from a previous marriage, in Hokkaido in March 2014. The couple welcomed a baby boy in April 2015.

== Discography ==
=== Mandarin albums ===
==== Solo ====
- Let Everything Go 追得過一切、愛我好嗎？ (10 March 1990)
- Maybe Tomorrow、我在你心裡有沒有重量？ (1 November 1990)
- My Dear My Friend、甜蜜心事 (1 July 1991)
- Noisy and Lonely 給我愛、寂寞喧嘩 (1 August 1992)
- Jasmine Dream in June 六月的茉莉夢、我一個人住 (1 June 1993)
- It Is Love 就要愛了嗎 (1 October 1994)
- Satisfaction 滿足 (5 October 1995)
- Lemon Tree (23 May 1996)
- Duck 鴨子 (27 December 1996)
- Fool 傻瓜 (8 August 1997)
- Happy Hours (15 January 1999)
- Tarcy's Lazy New Life 懶人日記 (31 December 1999)
- True Words of Love 戀戀真言 (25 December 2001)
- Tarcy Su 蘇慧倫 (25 April 2006)
- Left Hander, Revolving Door 左撇子、旋轉門。 (19 October 2007)
- Every Side of Me 面面 (9 March 2020)

==== EP ====
- Lemon Dance tracks
- 圈圈

==== Singles ====
- 我們快樂地向前走 (9 August 2016, online digital release)
- 為你變成他 (19 December 2019, online digital release)

==== Compilations ====
- 愛上飛鳥的女孩 (Apr 1994)
- 失戀萬歲 (selections + new songs)
- 蘇情時間：1990～2002全經典 (Hong Kong and Singapore limited release)
- 滾石香港黃金十年 (Hong Kong limited release)
- 30週年精選輯：生命之花 Flower of Life (28 August 2020)

=== Cantonese albums ===
==== Solo ====
- Think Sometimes 我有時會想 (November 1994)
- Naturally Like You 自然喜歡你 (February 1996)
- Tarcy Says...X-Files 話說蘇慧倫X檔案 (November 1996)

==== Compilation ====
- 倫選

== Filmography ==
=== Films ===
- Treasure Island (只要為你活一天, 1993), Ping
- Blue Moon (藍月, 1998)
- La mélodie d'Hélène (心戀, 2004), Lo Ning
- Blue Cha Cha (深海, 2005), Ah Yu
- God Man Dog (流浪神狗人, 2008), Ching-ching (2008 Rome Asian Film Festival, Best Lead Actress)
- You and Me (我和你, 2012), Teacher Ai

=== TV series ===
- (風和草的對話, 1990)
- (曉光, 2000)
- (一個住飯店的男人, 2001)
- (開枝散葉, 2002)
- Tong Nu Zhi Wu (童女之舞, 2002), Tong Su-xin
- Chasing After a Dream (追夢, 2002)
- (似水年華, 2003)
- (終身大事, 2003)
- Love Train (心動列車, 2003)
- The Vinegar Tribe (醋溜族, 2005)
- Honey and Clover (蜂蜜幸運草, 2008), Fang Li-Hua
- The Victims' Game (谁是被害者, 2024), Hsueh Hsin-Ning
