= Hsin Chi =

Taiwanese film director (1924–2010)

- Born: Xing Jin-Chuan; October 23, 1924; Wanhua district, Taipei, Taiwan
- Died: September 22, 2010 (aged 85)
- Occupations: Director, screenwriter, actor

Hsin Chi (辛奇) (23 October 1924 – 22 October 2010), birth name as Hsin Jin-Chuan (Chinese: 辛金傳), was a Taiwanese film director who was known for his Taiwanese-language films in the 1960s, including The Bride Who Has Returned From Hell (Chinese: 地獄新娘;1965), Foolish Bride, Naive Groom (Chinese: 三八新娘憨子婿;1967), and The Rice Dumpling Vendor (Chinese: 燒肉粽;1969). He directed nearly fifty Taiwanese-language films, most of them have a close relationship with plays and literature.

== Biography ==
Hsin Chi’s birth name was Xing Jin-Chuan (辛金傳). He was born in 1924 in Wanhua District, Taipei City. His home was close to the Wanhua Cinema (萬華戲院), where his neighbour worked, Hsin Chi thus developed had a love for cinema quite early in his life. He only enrolled in high school for a year before he transferred to polytechnic school. He started to develop an interest toward literature, and started to explore theatre. He went to Nihon University, Japan, and studied in the department of theatre in 1942 despite his family’s disagreement.

He dropped out of the university and came back to Taiwan in 1944, which was at the peak of the Japanization movement promoted by the Japanese government. Xing Jin-Chuan joined “Youth Culture Committee” (青年文化常會) and performed “street poetic play” (街頭詩劇). Due to the play’s implied questioning of Taiwan’s Japanese national identity, Hsin was investigated by the government. To him, plays were their media to spread patriotism and resist Japanese colonisation. He later joined the “Taiwan Theatre Committee” (台灣演劇協會) to be in charge of stage design and other works. He engaged in nearly all of the important theatre movements in Taiwan in the period of WWII until the restoration of Taiwan. When he was the editor of Local Theatre (地方戲劇), he used the name Hsin Chi as his pseudonym, and the name was kept for all his works afterwards.

In 1956, Hsin Chi adapted Cai Qiu Lin (蔡秋林)’s Xi Shi (西施), which was a script for Taiwanese opera, into film script to be filmed as Fan Li and Xi Shi (范蠡與西施). In the same year, Hsin adapted the play script Yu Ye Hua (雨夜花) into film script for the very first modern Taiwanese-language film of the same title. He founded Zhongxing Taiwanese Experimental Drama Club (中興台語實驗劇社) with Xu Shou-Ren (徐守仁) and Li Chuan (李川). They fostered Yang Ming (陽明), Jiang Nan (江南), Yu Han-Xiang (余漢祥), Chen Yun-Qing (陳雲卿) and several other stars of Taiwanese-language film.

In 1957, Hsin Chi directed his first film Gan Bao Guo Taiwan (甘國寶過台灣). That same year, he participated in the first edition of Taiwanese-Language Film Festival (台語片影展) held by the Intelligence News Agency (徵信新聞社) with his Miao Ying Piao Ling Ji (妙英飄零記) and Bo Min Hua (薄命花). In 1965, his Qiu Ni Yuan Liang (求妳原諒) won the Best Film award at the National Taiwanese-Language Film Exhibition (國產台語影片展覽會) held by the Taiwan Daily (台灣日報). Hsin Chi and Wang Yi-Juan(王薏雯) also won the Best Screenplay award for Bei Lian Gong Lu (悲戀公路) and Hsin Chi was selected as one of the top ten Taiwanese-language film directors and awarded the Baodao Award (Taiwan award/寶島獎). His Shuang Mian Qing Ren (雙面情人) released in 1965 was the first science fiction horror film in Taiwanese-Language films. In 1966, Hou Jie Ren Sheng (後街人生) was Hsin Chi 's most satisfying representative work in his film career. That same year, he directed his first Mandarin film Bing Dian (冰點). In 1970, he went to Hong Kong to work on the post-production of Shaw Brothers' Shadow Girl (隱身女俠) which was shot in Taiwan.

In 1971, Hsin Chi began working in television and became the theatrical instructor for several TV shows, including The Chinese Television Service’s (now Chinese Television System) Jia Qing Jun You Taiwan(Mr. Jia Qing’s tour to Taiwan/嘉慶君遊台灣), Xi Luo Qi Jian (The seven swords of xiluo/西螺七劍), Wang Ni Zao Gui (Hope you return soon/望你早歸), Nü Shen Long(Dragon goddess/女神龍), Shan Hu Tan Zhi Lian (Love in Coral Lake/珊瑚潭之戀)", and Taiwan Television Enterprise’s Mu Lei Di Di Ai (Mother's tears of love/母淚滴滴愛), etc. In 1972, he went to Indonesia to film Jing Jing Xun Mu Ji (晶晶尋母記), which was not released in Taiwan. In 1978, he won the Golden Bell Award for Best Educational and Cultural Program Award for his educational program Ai Xin (Love/愛心). In 1979, he directed Drunken Shrimp, Crab, and Fish (醉魚醉蝦醉螃蟹), which was his last film.

Beginning in 1990, Hsin Chi assisted the National Film Archive to sort and catalogue Taiwanese-language film materials. In 1996, he acted in TV dramas Chunhua Dream" (春花夢露) and "Dharma " (達摩). He became the president of the "Taiwanese Film and Television Artists Association" (台語片演藝人員聯誼會) in 1997 and organized the "Taiwanese Filmmakers Group" (台灣影人劇團) the following year. In 1999, director Lai Feng-Qi (賴豐奇) made a documentary about him entitled On Hsin Chi and his A-Team for Taiwanese-Language Films (班底/角色-辛奇導演). In 2001, the "Taiwanese Film and Television Artists Association" expanded and became the "Taiwanese Filmmakers Group" (台灣影人協會), with Hsin Chi serving as the first chairman.

Hsin Chi died due to colorectal cancer in 2010.

== Filmography ==
Year	Chinese title	English title	Ref.
1956	甘國寶過台灣	Gan Bao Guo Taiwan/Gan Bao’s journey to Taiwan	
1957	薄命花	Bo Min Hua/Ill fated flower	
1957	妙英飄零記	Miao Ying Piao Ling Ji/Miao-Ying’s story	
1958	恨命莫怨天	Hen Ming Mo Yuan Tian	
1963	吻一下	Wen Yi Xia/One kiss	
1963	湯島白梅記	Tang Dao Bai Mei Ji	
1964	為著五角銀	Wei Zhu Wu Jiao Yin/For fifty cent	
1964	河邊春夢	He Bian Chun Meng/Wet dream beside the river	
1964	天災地變彼一夜	Tian Zai Di Bian Bi Yi Ye/The night everything changed	
1964	恩愛三百六十五回	En Ai San Bai Liu Shi Wu Hui	
1965	故鄉聯絡船	Gu Xiang Lian Luo Chuan	
1965	女通緝犯	Nü Tong Qi Fan/The wanted woman	
1965	難忘的車站	Encounter At The Station	
1965	破棉被	Po Mian Bei	
1965	求妳原諒	Qiu Ni Yuan Liang/Begging for your forgiveness	
1965	雙面情人	Shuang Mian Qing Ren/The two-sided lover	
1965	悲戀公路	Bei Lian Gong Lu/Tragic romance on the highway	
1965	地獄新娘	The Bride Who Has Returned From Hell	
1965	後街人生	Hou Jie Ren Sheng/Life at the backstreet	
1966	冰點	Bing Dian/Freezing point	
1966	夢中的媽媽	Meng Zhong De Ma Ma/Mother in the dream	
1966	死光錶	Si Guang Biao	
1966	悲戀關子嶺	Bei Lian Guan Zi Ling/Tragic romance in Guan Zi Ling/	
1966	玉面狐狸	Yu Mian Hu Li	
1967	酒女夢	Jiu Nü Meng	
1967	暗淡的月	An Dan De Yue/Dim Moon	
1967	三八新娘憨子婿	Foolish Bride, Naive Groom	
1967	南北歌王	Nan Bei Ge Wang/King Of Singing	
1967	三聲無奈	San Sheng Wu Nai/Helpless	
1968	醉俠神劍	Zui Xia Shen Jian/Drunk Man Excalibur	
1968	勿欠賬	Wu Qian Zhang/No Debt Aloud	
1968	少女的煩惱	Shao Nü De Fan Nao/Teenage Girl Troubles	
1968	阿西返外家	A Xi Fan Wai Jia/A Xi’s Return To Mother’s	
1968	處女心	Chu Nü Xin/First Timer Heart/	
1968	阿西做大舅	A Xi Is An Uncle	
1969	暗光島	An Guang Dao/Dark Light Island	
1969	阿西父子	A Xi Fu Zi/A Xi And Son	
1969	劉茶古遊台北	Liu Cha Gu You Tai Bei/Mr Liu Goes To Taipei	
1969	新烘爐新茶古	Xin Hong Lu Xin Cha Gu/New Oven New Tea	
1969	金瓜寮老師父	Jin Gua Liao Lao Shi Fu/Jingualiao Old Master	
1969	再會十七歲	Zai Hui Shi Qi Sui/Goodbye My 17	
1969	無法度	Wu Fa Du/No Way	
1969	燒肉粽	The Rice Dumpling Vendor	
1969	危險的青春	Dangerous Youth	
1969	妙夫妙妻	Miao Fu Miao Qi/The Amazing Couple	
1969	丈夫要出嫁	Zhang Fu Yao Chu Jia/Husband Got Married	
1969	鑼聲若響	Luo Sheng Ruo Xiang/The Drumbeat	
1970	鬼見愁	Gui Jian Chou/Devil May Cry	
1970	盲女勾魂劍	The Seizure Soul Sword of a Blind Girl	
1971	大煞星	Da Sha Xing/Bad Luck	
1971	隱身女俠	Shadow Girl	
1972	晶晶尋母記	Jing Jing Xun Mu Ji/Jingjing’s Adventure Seeking Mother	
1979	醉魚醉蝦醉螃蟹	Drunken Shrimp, Fish, and Crab	
