= Lou Yi-an =

Taiwanese filmmaker

- 樓一安
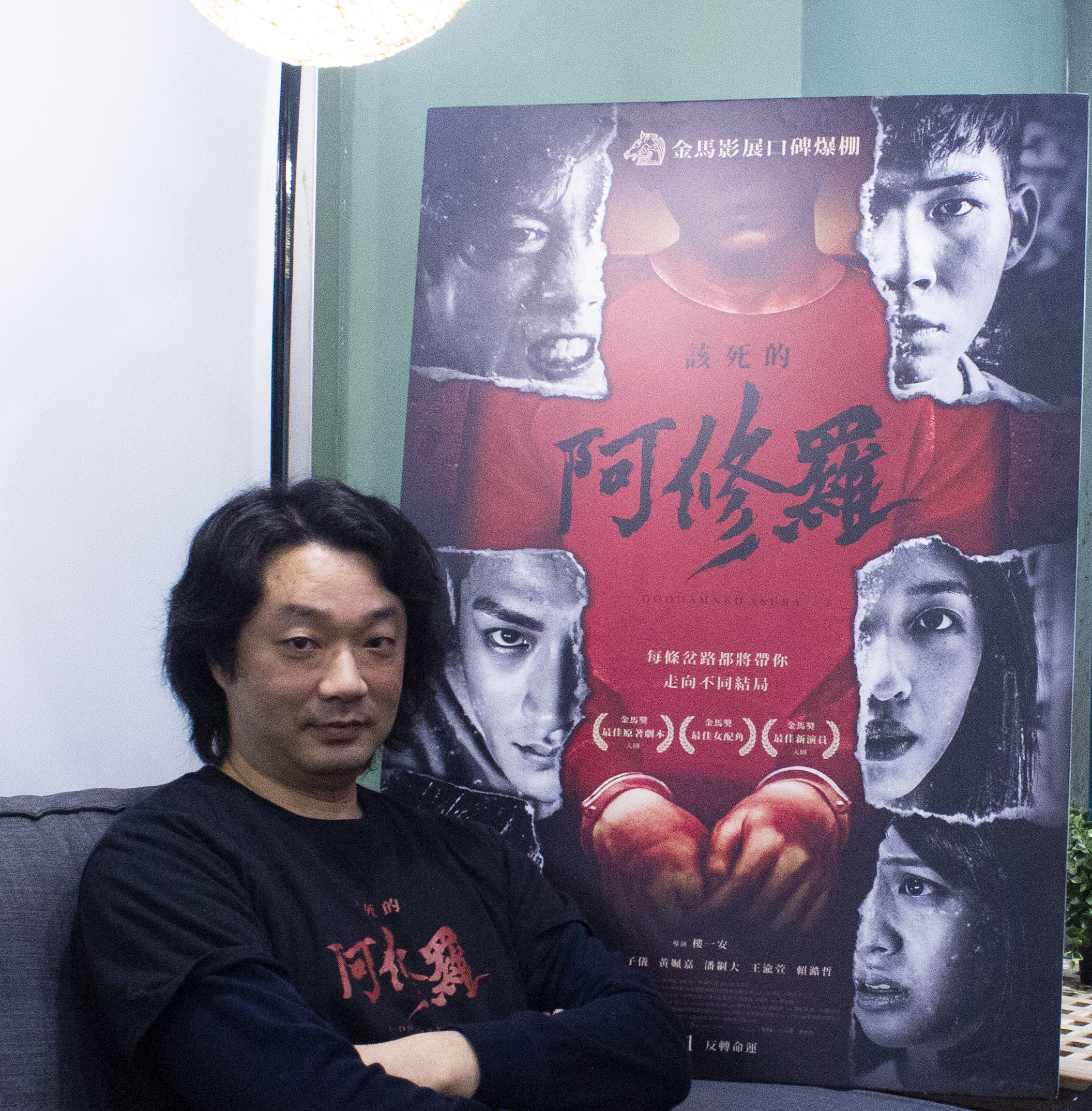
- Born: Taipei
- Occupations: Film director, Script-writer

Lou Yi-an (Chinese: 樓一安; pinyin: Lóu Yīān) is a Taiwanese writer and director devoted to both the cinema and television industry. He is known for his dark humor, character-driven intricate story lines. He often portrays the working class and the migrants in a context of social and racial discrimination.

He got noticed in 2006 when he won the Best Director in a Miniseries award from the 41st Golden Bell Awards in 2006. Later in 2007 he won, together with Singing Chen the Best Original Screenplay award at the 44th Golden Horse Awards. Several of Lou's films also include Chen's work, such as the short Waterfront Villa Bonita (2007), Bundled (2000), God Man Dog (2007) and Lou's first long-feature as a director A Place of One's Own (2009) that focused on poor people living in New Taipei City.

In 2010, he wrote A Gloomy Salad Day, a TV series that examined adolescence.

In 2013, Lou was commissioned by the Hakka Television Service to make The Losers. Lou drew inspiration for the project from the Hakka band Labor Exchange, specifically the album Night March of the Chrysanthemums. The film touched on Taiwanese culture, social and racial issues caused by class and age gaps. It portrayed rural life in Meinong, Kaohsiung. Due to The Losers heavy subject matter, Lou was advised not to theatrically release it. As a result, the film was shown for one week only at the Spot Huashan Cinema in Taipei. In April 2016, Lou traveled to London to attend a screening of The Losers at SOAS, University of London.

In 2015, he directed and co-wrote White Lies, Black Lies. Different from his previous works, it focused on the psychological aftermath of murders committed in 1960s Wanhua District of Taipei. It is Lou Yi-an's first successfully commercial big screen movie.

In 2018, he then returned to television with the TV series Roseki, which is also well appraised by the public and confirmed his renown in Taiwan. Roseki is a 14-episode drama that relates the life of the famous Taipei writer and singer Lu Ho-juo during the Japanese colonization, alternating between the singer's stage life and personal life. The show was premiered on Hakka TV.

In 2021 he worked as a director and screenwriter on the TV series Heaven on the 4th Floor, as well as Goddamned Asura, for which he earned a Best Screenplay award at the Taipei Film Festival and a Best Original Screenplay nomination at the Taiwanese Golden Horse Film Festival.

== Filmography ==
=== Film ===
Year	Title	Director	Writer
2000	Bundled (我叫阿銘啦)	(Assistant-director)	No
2007	God Man Dog (流浪神狗人)	No	Yes (Co-writer)
2009	A Place of One's Own（一席之地	Yes	Yes
2013	The Losers (廢物)	Yes	Yes
2016	White Lies, Black Lies (失控謊言)	Yes	Yes (Co-writer)
2022	Goddamned Asura	Yes	Yes (Co-writer)

=== Television ===
Year	Title	Director	Writer
2005	快樂的出航 (no English title)	Yes	Yes
2010	A Gloomy Salad Day (死神少女)	No	Yes
2013	月光森林 (no English title)	Yes	(Co-writer)
2018	Roseki (臺北歌手)	Yes	(Co-writer)
2021	Heaven on the 4th Floor (四樓的天堂)	No	Yes

=== Short film ===
Year	Title	Director	Writer
2002	花願 (no English title)	Yes	No
2007	Waterfront Villa Bonita (水岸麗景)	Yes	Yes
2012	When Yesterday Comes (昨日的記憶), segment "The Clock" (阿霞的掛鐘)	No	(Co-writer)

== Awards and nominations ==
Year	Festival	Award	Status	For
2022	Taipei Film Festival	Best Screenplay	Won	Goddamned Asura
2022	Taipei Film Festival	Best Editing	Nominated	Goddamned Asura
2021	Golden Horse	Best Original Screenplay	Nominated	Goddamned Asura
2018	Golden Bell	Best Writing for a Television Series	Won	Roseki
2018	Golden Bell	Creative Program Award	Won	Roseki
2018	Golden Bell	Best Directing for a Television Series	Nominated	Roseki
2018	Asian Academy Creative Awards	Best Original Screenplay	Nominated	Roseki
2018	Asian Academy Creative Awards	Best Direction (Fiction)	Nominated	Roseki
2016	Chinese Young Generation Film Forum	Jury Award	Won	White Lies, Black Lies
2014	Fukuoka Asian Film Festival	Grand Prix	Won	The Losers
2016	Taipei Film Festival	Best Screenplay	Nominated	White Lies, Black Lies
2009	Taipei Film Festival	Audience Award	Won	A Place of One's Own
2009	Taipei Film Festival	Grand Prix	Nominated	A Place of One's Own
2009	Bratislava International Film Festival	Grand Prix	Nominated	A Place of One's Own
2008	Durban International Film Festival	Best Screenplay	Won	God Man Dog
2007	Golden Horse	Best Original Screenplay	Nominated	God Man Dog
2006	Golden Bell	Miniseries Writer Award	Won	快樂的出航 (no English title)
