= Let's Talk About Chu =

Taiwanese television series

- Promotional poster
- Genre: Sex comedy; Comedy drama
- Starring: Chan Tzu-hsuan; Kai Ko; Wu Chien-ho; Kimi Hsia; Umin Boya; Miao Ke-li
- Country of origin: Taiwan
- Original languages: Mandarin; Taiwanese Hokkien
- No. of seasons: 1
- No. of episodes: 8

Production
- Producer: Huang Jie-yu
- Running time: 43–58 minutes

Original release
- Network: Netflix
- Release: 2 February 2024

Let's Talk About Chu (stylized as Let's Talk About CHU) (Chinese: 愛愛內含光) is a Taiwanese sex comedy television series directed by Huang Jie-yu and starring Chan Tzu-hsuan, Kai Ko, Wu Chien-ho, Kimi Hsia, Umin Boya and Miao Ke-li as the lead characters. The first season of the show consisted of eight episodes, premiering on Netflix on 2 February 2024.

== Synopsis ==
The show follows the character of a waxer Chu Ai, who also runs a sex education vlog as a side hustle. Living by her motto of "Only Sex, No Love," she has a long-term sexual relationship with Ping-ke. In the face of the challenges and conflicts that arise from the Chu family's, unfulfilled demands for sex and love, Chu Ai strives to find the answer to desire and self-discovery and start a relationship that goes beyond the physical.

== Cast ==
- Chan Tzu-hsuan as Chu Ai
- Kai Ko as Chou Ping-ke, Chu Ai's university classmate and friend with benefits
- JC Lin as Chu Yu-sen, Chu Ai’s elder brother
- Wu Chien-ho as A-yu, casino manager
- Kimi Hsia as Chu Wei, Chu Ai's elder sister, who works as an administrative counter in the school library, married Lin Shijie, a professor at the school, and her life became less and less "sexual" due to the age gap
- Umin Boya as Lin Shijie, Chu Wei's husband, school professor
- Miao Ke-li as Chu Ye Meizhi, Chi’s mother is a very traditional conservative mother.
- Wang Yu-xuan as An-ni, a student taught by Lin Shijie
