= Ice Poison =

2014 film

- Film poster
- Directed by: Midi Z
- Written by: Midi Z
- Produced by: Midi Z Patrick Mao Huang
- Starring: Wang Shin-hong; Wu Ke-xi
- Cinematography: Fan Sheng-Siang
- Edited by: Lin Sheng-Wen; Midi Z
- Release dates: 8 February 2014 (Berlin); 18 July 2014 (Taiwan)
- Running time: 95 minutes
- Country: Taiwan
- Languages: Southwestern Mandarin; Burmese

Ice Poison (Chinese: 冰毒; pinyin: Bīngdú; trans. "Methamphetamine") is a 2014 Taiwanese drama film directed by Midi Z. It was screened in the Panorama section of the 64th Berlin International Film Festival, and was selected as the Taiwanese entry for the Best Foreign Language Film at the 87th Academy Awards, but was not nominated.

== Cast ==
- Wang Shin-hong
- Wu Ke-xi

== See also ==
- List of submissions to the 87th Academy Awards for Best Foreign Language Film
- List of Taiwanese submissions for the Academy Award for Best Foreign Language Film
