= Bundled (film) =

- Film poster
- Chinese: 我叫阿銘啦
- Hanyu Pinyin: Wo jiao A-Ming la
- Directed by: Singing Chen
- Written by: Singing Chen
- Produced by: Hui-ju Hsu
- Starring: Mu-tsuen Yen; Li-te Chen; Yui-wei Zhang
- Cinematography: Ko-shung Shen; Zhang Yong-ming
- Edited by: Singing Chen; Chen Xiao-jing
- Music by: Yui-wei Zhang; Singing Chen
- Release date: October 10, 2001 (Taiwan)
- Running time: 78 minutes
- Country: Taiwan
- Language: Mandarin

Bundled (我叫阿銘啦, Wo jiao A-Ming la) is a 2001 Taiwanese film written and directed by Singing Chen. It was Chen's directorial debut. Shot in a surreal style, it focuses on a group of marginalized wanderers with no identities, who inhabit the dark corners of Taipei City. The only way they give meanings to their lives is through dreaming. Chen has characters talk in dreams or debate with each other to reflect the dialectics of reality and fantasy and explore the imaginarium of the homeless. Chen also infuses the film with various musical elements and has the characters convey their sense of loss and desire for belonging through singing.

== Plot ==
The homeless man Ah-ming unintentionally stumbled upon a V8 camcorder in a garbage heap. Inside, he discovered a family recording depicting a lively and adorable little girl, surrounded by a warm atmosphere. Ah-ming became captivated by the images, always introducing himself to others as "I'm Ah-ming," telling everyone that the family in the video was his own, and the little girl was his granddaughter. But he couldn't recall where he came from or where he was headed. He met Yong, a man who played the moon lute after a work injury prevented him from continuing his job. Yong took Ah-ming back to his simple dwelling beneath an overpass. Ah-ming entered the footage, feeling as if he had become a part of that warm family.

A young man named Whippersnapper who was once a one-million literary award winner. Now, he wandered through one dream after another. Reporter was the only one who remembered Whippersnapper. She discovered him living with the erratic Chun in an abandoned vehicle. Reporter made every effort to awaken Whippersnapper from his dreams, but he remained lost between reality and the dreamscapes, continuously crafting a story without a beginning or an end.

Ah-ming walked through the crevices between buildings, along the desolate riverbank, and ventured into construction sites, crossing paths with numerous people in the underground tunnels. He met Yong, a man who lost his job after a work injury and played moon lute to express his bitterness. Ah-ming joined in singing with him, and they gradually became good friends.

The television journalist Wenping was the only one who remembered Whippersnapper. She discovered him living with the erratic Ah-Chun in an abandoned, rundown vehicle. Wenping made every effort to awaken Whippersnapper from his dreams, but he remained lost between reality and the dreamscapes, continuously crafting a story without a beginning or an end.

When a cold front swept through, Whippersnapper was awakened by Chun, but he remained in a dream. In his dream, children in the city contracted an infectious disease and climbed up tall buildings. The parents tied them up with ropes, but one child still fell. Whippersnapper realized it was his own child. Chun also woke up at the construction site and noticed a homeless friend's death.

Reporter interviewed Ah-ming, believing everything he said, and put the videotape on her program, hoping to help Ah-ming find his family.

Yong's singing gradually merged with the laughter in the family video cassette, and Ah-ming walked inside. Whippersnapper also walked inside, unable to distinguish whose dream it was anymore. Reporter found Whippersnapper and wanted to publish his work, but he showed no interest, seemingly preferring to remain in his dreams. Ah-ming could not find Yong and the camcorder disabled at that moment. Ah-ming carried Yong's moon lute and left.

Ah-ming, Chun, and Whippersnapper all wanted to leave. They boarded a boat to set sail, seeking a better place. However, Whippersnapper remained in a deep slumber, and Ah-ming continued drifting through the city in a makeshift work recruitment vehicle. They had left yet still remained, asleep yet also awake in a space where dreams merged with reality.

== Cast ==
- Mu-tsuen Yen as Ah-ming (阿銘)
- Li-te Chen as Whippersnapper Chen Yao-chih (少年仔/陳耀志)
- Yui-wei Zhang as Yong (勇伯)
- Zhong-ying Lin as Chun (阿春)
- Jien Lee as Abuji (阿不幾)
- Ping Juan as Reporter (女記者)
- Tsung-hsi Lin as Cameraman (攝影師)
- Hsin-ru Wu as Granddaughter Ruru (孫女如如)

== Music ==
Category	Name	Music by	Lyrics by	Sung by	Musical instruments	Recorded by
Theme song	Bundled (離開)	Yui-wei Zhang	Singing Chen	n/a		
Theme song	Fate (認命)	Yui-wei Zhang			n/a	(C)&(P)Cristal
Title song	Dark Sky (烏天烏地)	Labor Exchange Band	n/a		Full-moon Guitar by Sheng-hsiang Lin, Cymbal & Fan Drum by Cheng-da Chung	n/a
Interlude	Dream (夢)	Yui-wei Zhang			n/a	(C)&(P)Cristal
Ending song	Nostalgia song (相思曲)	n/a		Chin-lin Hse	Full-moon Guitar by Chin-lin Hse, violin by Huai-yi Shen, percussion by Yi-chang Li	

== Production ==
The ruins where the homeless reside in the film are located near Tianmu, a well-known affluent neighborhood in Taipei City. The scenes depicted in the film mostly showcase the overlooked outskirts of Taipei, places that people usually pass by without noticing, such as under the elevated bridge, a waste paper processing plant, riverbanks, underground tunnels, valleys, junkyards, as well as abandoned and unfinished concrete buildings. The production team spent six months on pre-production work to scout these locations and represent them accurately.

== Awards and nominations ==
In the year 2000, Bundled won the Best Drama and Singing Chen won the Most Promising Director of the Year at Taipei Film Festival and it was nominated for Best New Performer and Best Original Film Song at Golden Horse Award and also Vancouver International Film Festival.

Pure 16 Film Festival was a film festival that only screened movies produced with 16mm film, held by a group of Taiwanese film workers. From 2000 to 2004 it held only four editions. Bundled was premiered at this film festival in 2001. In 2016, Kaohsiung Film Festival held a special unit to honor the Pure 16, in which Bundled was included. After the release in 2016, the Kaohsiung Film Archive actively planned and prepared for the restoration and digital preservation of these Taiwanese short films. Finally, the Taiwan Short Film Restoration Project was launched, aiming to digitally restore and preserve eight short films in collaboration with relevant organizations and scholars. In 2019, Kaohsiung Film Festival presented the first screening of the "Independent Era: Taiwanese Short Film Digital Restoration Project 1999-2005."
