= Black Tea (film) =

2024 film by Abderrahmane Sissako

- Theatrical release poster
- Directed by: Abderrahmane Sissako
- Written by: Kessen Fatoumata Tall; Abderrahmane Sissako
- Produced by: David Gauquié; Julien Deris; Denis Freyd; Kessen Fatoumata Tall; Jean-Luc Ormières
- Starring: Nina Mélo; Chang Han; Wu Ke-xi
- Cinematography: Aymerick Pilarski
- Edited by: Nadia Ben Rachid
- Music by: Armand Amar
- Production companies: Cinéfrance Studios; Archipel 35; Dune Vision; Gaumont; Red Lion; House on Fire; House on Fire International; Wassakara Productions; Arte France Cinéma
- Distributed by: Gaumont (France); Pathé BC Afrique (Sub-Saharan Africa and Maghreb); Cinéart (Benelux); AV Jet (Taiwan)
- Release dates: 21 February 2024 (Berlinale); 28 February 2024 (France)
- Running time: 111 minutes
- Countries: France; Mauritania; Luxembourg; Taiwan; Ivory Coast
- Languages: Mandarin; French; English; Portuguese
- Budget: €6,360,000
- Box office: €518,000

Black Tea is a 2024 romantic drama film co-written and directed by Abderrahmane Sissako. The film starring Nina Mélo and Chang Han is about an Ivorian woman in her 30s who immigrates to China and falls in love with a 45 year old Chinese man.

An international co-production between France, Mauritania, Luxembourg, Taiwan and Ivory Coast, it was selected in the Competition at the 74th Berlin International Film Festival held from 15 to 25 February 2024, where it competed for the Golden Bear with its first screening on 21 February at Berlinale Palast. It was theatrically released in France on 28 February 2024.

== Synopsis ==
On her wedding day, Aya, a young woman in her early thirties from Ivory Coast shocks everyone by rejecting her groom. She moves to Guangzhou, China and finds a job in a tea export shop, where she meets Cai, a Chinese man who is 45 years old. They fall in love, but their relationship faces challenges from their history and the bias of others.

== Cast ==
- Nina Mélo as Aya
- Chang Han as Cai
- Wu Ke-xi
- Michael Chang
- Pei Jen Yu
- Wei Huang
- Emery Gahuranyi
- Isabelle Kabano
- Marie Odo
- Franck Pycardhy
- Cheikh Ahmed Kenkou

== Production ==
The film previously titled The Perfumed Hill directed and co-written by Abderrahmane Sissako stars Nina Mélo, Chang Han and Wu Ke-xi. It is produced by Cinéfrance Studios, Archipel 35 and Dune Vision. The French distribution and international sales rights are with Gaumont. The director was inspired to write this story after discovering a restaurant called "La Colline Parfumée" (The Perfumed Hill) run by an Afro-Chinese couple.

== Release ==
Black Tea had its world premiere on 21 February 2024, as part of the 74th Berlin International Film Festival, in Competition.

It was released in the French theatres on 28 February 2024 by Gaumont.

It closed the 39th Mons International Film Festival on 16 March 2024.

The film will be screened in 'Panorama' at the 2024 Vancouver International Film Festival on 27 September 2024.

== Reception ==
On the review aggregator Rotten Tomatoes website, the film has an approval rating of 22% based on 9 reviews, with an average rating of 6/10. On Metacritic, it has a weighted average score of 52 out of 100 based on 4 reviews, indicating "Mixed or Average". On the AlloCiné, which lists 19 press reviews, the film obtained an average rating of 2.6/5.

Ben Rolph in AwardsWatch graded the film A and praised the director Abderrahmane Sissako for his deft handling of the film writing, "The film is slow and tenderly told, without a doubt this is the work of a master filmmaker in complete control of his craft". Appreciating the performance Rolph said, "top actors deliver sublime and subtle performances," and "Nina Mélo is delightful to watch, she plays Aya with a tact and heart". Commending cinematographer, Rolph stated, "The film is out-of-this-world stunning, almost everything that cinematographer Aymerick Pilarski shoots is in an observational way as if we are peering into their lives, watching from a close and intimate distance." Concluding his review, he wrote, "Black Tea is truly remarkable and has a message that will connect to audiences all around the world."

Guy Lodge writing in Variety gave negative review and said, "The film aims for woozy sensualism but falls way short on the ambient richness and X-factor chemistry required to sell such an essentially confected exercise."

Jordan Mintzer reviewing the film for The Hollywood Reporter dubbed it as "Enigmatic to a fault," and opined, "Black Tea fails to live up to that standard, taking an intriguing character like Aya to a fascinating place, only to lose us along the way."

Clarence Tsui of South China Morning Post rated the film 2/5 and criticized the film writing, "It does not live up to its promise, with stilted dialogue, shallow characters and a tone-deaf representation of the African diaspora’s experience in the country." Writing in concluding paragraph Tsui said, "This is, after all, a film in which its black protagonist gladly accepts being nicknamed "Black Tea" by his well-meaning colleagues – a red flag, perhaps, of how misguided the film is."

Rachel Pronger of IndieWire reviewing at Berlinale graded the film B and wrote, "For all its comforting warmth, Sissako’s film ultimately lacks the deeper complexity of its namesake, even if watching it is often as soothing as sipping a freshly brewed cup."

Fabien Lemercier reviewing the film at Berlinale for Cineuropa wrote, "Abderrahmane Sissako breaks down the boundaries between Africa and Asia, dream and reality, and past and present in an enigmatic and melancholy film on love and freedom."

Jonathan Romney reviewing the film at Berlinale, wrote in ScreenDaily "However appealing the blend sometimes is, this wildly eccentric film ultimately feels a few leaves short of a pot."

Nicholas Bell in Ion Cinema rated the film with one star and said, "Shockingly dull and overtly ludicrous, it’s a far cry from Sissako’s Cesar-sweeping third feature, Timbuktu."

== Accolades ==
The film was selected in Competition at the 74th Berlin International Film Festival, thus it was nominated to compete for Golden Bear award.

Award	Date	Category	Recipient	Result	Ref.
Berlin International Film Festival	25 February 2024	Golden Bear	Abderrahmane Sissako	Nominated	
