= Goddamned Asura =

- Promotional poster
- Traditional Chinese: 該死的阿修羅
- Simplified Chinese: 该死的阿修罗
- Literal meaning: damned Asura
- Hanyu Pinyin: Gāisǐ de Āxiūluó
- Directed by: Lou Yi-an
- Written by: Lou Yi-an; Singing Chen
- Produced by: Gao Junting; Xu Guolun; Wang Xinhong
- Starring: Joseph Huang; Mo Tzu-yi; Peijia Huang; Devin Pan; Wang Yu-xuan; Hao-zhe Lai
- Cinematography: Yang Fong-ming
- Edited by: Chen Hsiao-Tong; Lou Yi-an; Singing Chen
- Music by: Hu Xusong
- Production companies: Content Digital Film Co., Ltd; SEASHORE IMAGE PRODUCTIONS CO., LTD.
- Distributed by: Hope Marketing Entertainment; Content Digital Film Co., Ltd.
- Release dates: November 2021 (Golden Horse Film Festival); 3 November 2022 (Taiwan)
- Running time: 114 minutes
- Country: Taiwan
- Language: Mandarin Chinese

Goddamned Asura (Chinese: 該死的阿修羅; pinyin: Gāisǐ de Āxiūluó) is a 2021 Taiwanese crime drama film directed by Lou Yi-an and written by Lou Yi-an and Singing Chen. The film features an ensemble cast of six actors Joseph Huang, Mo Tzu-yi, Peijia Huang, Devin Pan, Wang Yu-xuan and Hoa-zhe Lai. It was inspired by real life events from newspaper reports on random killings. The film is selected as the Taiwanese entry for the Best International Feature Film at the 95th Academy Awards. In November 2021, the film premiered at Taipei's Golden Horse film Festival where it was nominated for Best New Performer (Pan), Best Original Screenplay and won the Best Supporting Actress Award (Wang).

In July 2022, Goddammed Asura participated in Taipei Film Festival, among the nine nominations it won Best Screenplay, Best Supporting Actress (Wang) and Best Soundtrack (for Qin Xuzhang, Xu Jiawei, Chan Liu and Cai Jiaying). The film also participated the Judicial Film Festival in November 2021, Singapore Chinese Film Festival in December 2021, Taiwan Film Festival in Australia in July 2022, Vancouver Taiwanese Film Festival and the Hong Kong Film Festival in August 2022. It will also participate the Paris Filmosa Festival in September 2022.

== Awards and nominations ==
Year	Awards ceremony	Category	Result	Nominee
2022	Taipei Film Festival	Best Screenplay	Won	Lou Yi-an and Singing Chen
2022	Taipei Film Festival	Best Feature Film	Nominated	Goddamned Asura
2022	Taipei Film Festival	Best Director	Nominated	Lou Yi-an
2022	Taipei Film Festival	Best Supporting Actor	Nominated	Devin Pan
2022	Taipei Film Festival	Best Supporting Actor	Nominated	Mo Tzu-yi
2022	Taipei Film Festival	Best Editing	Nominated	Lou Yi-an, Singing Chen, Xiaodong Chen
2022	Taipei Film Festival	Best Supporting Actress	Won	Wang Yu-xuan
2022	Taipei Film Festival	Best Soundtrack	Won	Qin Xuzhang, Xu Jiawei, Chan Liu and Cai Jiaying
2022	Taipei Film Festival	Make-up Artist	Nominated	Lijia Yang
2021	Golden Horse Film Festival and Awards	Best Supporting Actress	Won	Wang Yu-xuan
2021	Golden Horse Film Festival and Awards	Best Original Screenplay	Nominated	Lou Yi-an and Singing Chen
2021	Golden Horse Film Festival and Awards	Best New Performer	Nominated	Devin Pan

== Reception ==
On 17 March 2022, the reporter Han Chen wrote in the Taipei Times magazine: "The acting is solid across the board, and production value high..."

On 26 July 2022, the magazine Fletcher & Third wrote in a multi page review: "A rich, complex and emotive study of Taipei's disillusioned youth, Goddamned Asura can occasionally touch on the bleak, offering a dispassionate outlook on contemporary youth culture. But it's also oddly enchanting; an intriguing work of cinema thats both captivating and ambitious in its execution, and ultimately deserving of attention."

== See also ==
- List of submissions to the 95th Academy Awards for Best International Feature Film
- List of Taiwanese submissions for the Academy Award for Best International Feature Film
