= Midi Z =

Taiwanese film director (born 1982)

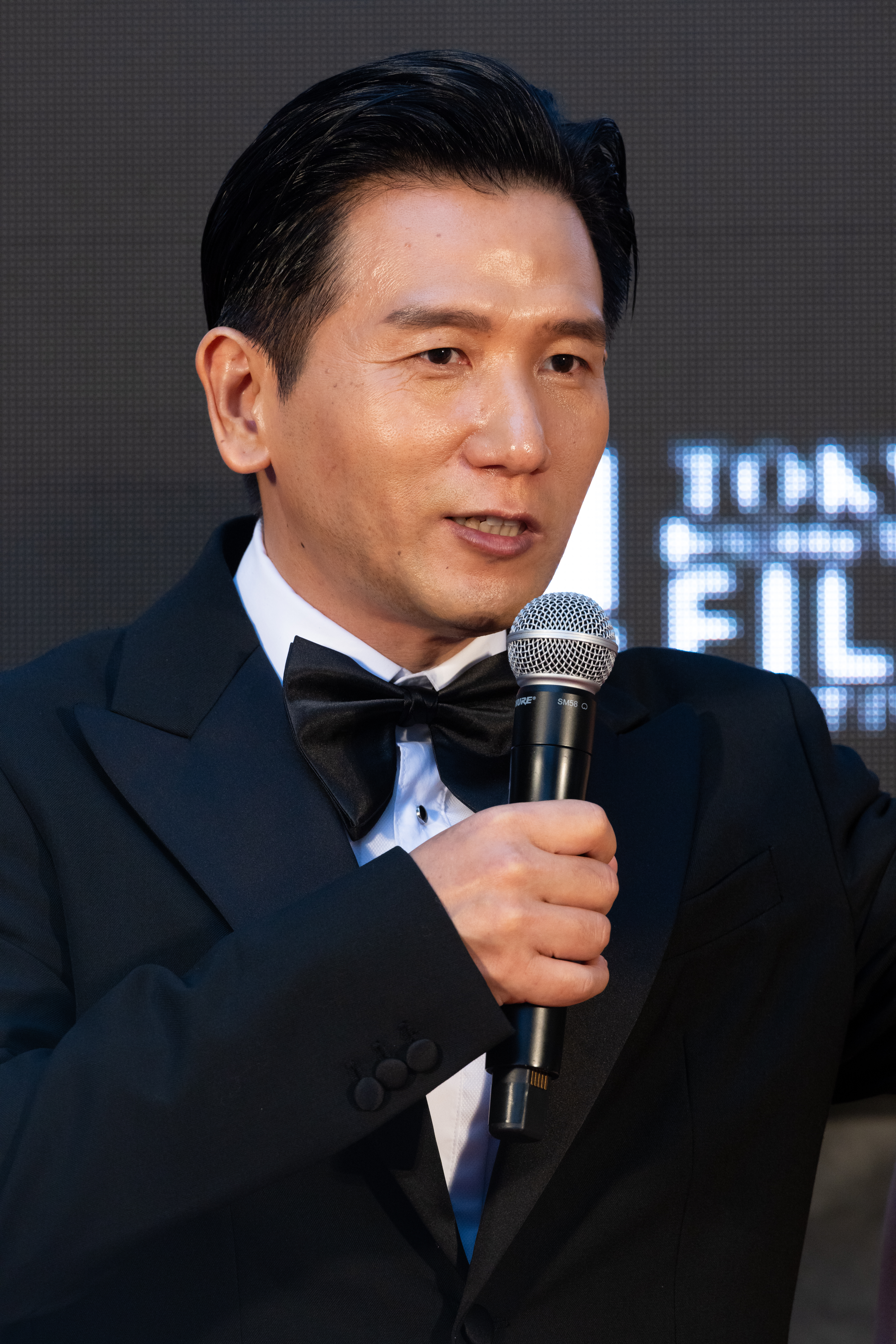
- Midi Z at the Tokyo International Film Festival in 2024
- Born: Chao Teh-in; December 18, 1982 (age 43); Lashio, Shan State, Myanmar
- Education: National Taiwan University of Science and Technology Master of Design
- Occupations: Film director, screenwriter, cinematographer, editor
- Awards: 53rd Golden Horse Awards, Taipei Film Awards

Midi Z (Chinese: 趙德胤; pinyin: Zhào Déyìn; Wade–Giles: Chao^{4} Teh^{2}-in^{4}; born December 18, 1982) is a Myanmar-born Taiwanese film director. He is known for his films Ice Poison (2014), The Road to Mandalay (2016), and The Unseen Sister (2024).

== Life and career ==
Chao was born in Lashio, Shan State, Myanmar. Both his parents are of Chinese descent, and his ancestral home is in Nanking. The son of a cook and a doctor, Chao was the youngest of five children and grew up poor. He won a scholarship and moved to Taiwan when he was 16, where he went to high school. Chao received both his bachelor's degree and master's degree in design at National Taiwan University of Science and Technology, after which he became a naturalized Taiwanese citizen in 2011.

He was named Outstanding Taiwanese Filmmaker of the Year at the 53rd Golden Horse Awards in 2016.

== Filmography ==
=== Features ===
- 2011: Return to Burma (歸來的人)
- 2012: Poor Folk (窮人。榴槤。麻藥。偷渡客)
- 2014: Ice Poison (冰毒)
- 2016: The Road to Mandalay (再見瓦城)
- 2019: Nina Wu (灼人秘密)
- 2024: The Unseen Sister (乔妍的心事)
- TBA: The Exiles

=== Documentaries ===
- 2015: Jade Miners (挖玉石的人)
- 2016: City of Jade (翡翠之城)
- 2018: 14 Apples (十四顆蘋果)

=== Short films ===
- 2014: The Palace on the Sea

== Awards ==
- 2014: Taipei Film Awards: Best Director
- 2016: 53rd Golden Horse Awards: Outstanding Taiwanese Filmmaker of the Year
- 2016: 73rd Venice International Film Festival: FEDEORA Award for Best Film
