= Kaohsiung Film Festival =

Annual film festival in Taiwan

Kaohsiung Film Festival 高雄電影節
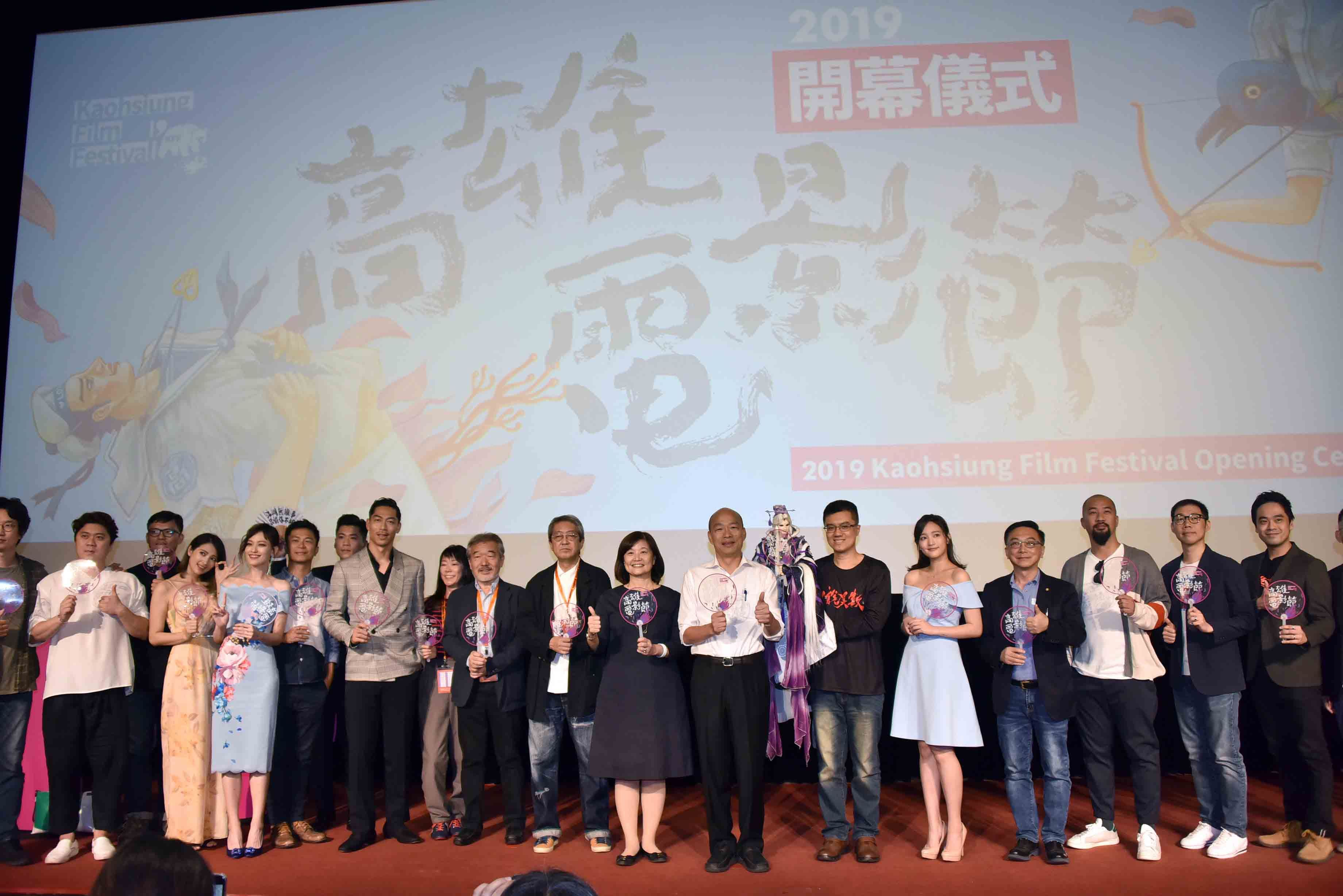
- 2019 Kaohsiung Film Festival
- Location: Kaohsiung City, Taiwan
- Founded: 2001; 25 years ago
- Hosted by: Kaohsiung's Cultural Affairs Department, Kaohsiung Film Archive
- Language: International
- Website: www.kff.tw/en

The Kaohsiung Film Festival (KFF; Chinese: 高雄電影節) is a film festival held annually in Kaohsiung City, Taiwan. Established in 2001, the festival screens both locally produced and international films, in all genres and lengths. The festival also has an international competition section where it hands out awards for outstanding short films.
