= 49th Hong Kong International Film Festival =

Film festival in Hong Kong

- HKIFF official poster
- Opening film: The Brightest Sun by Tetsuya Nakashima; Pavane for an Infant by Chong Keat Aun
- Closing film: Dreams (Sex Love) by Dag Johan Haugerud
- Founded: 1977
- Awards: Firebird (Chinese-language): To Kill a Mongolian Horse by Jiang Xiaoxuan; Firebird (World): Black Ox by Tsuta Tetsuichiro; Firebird (Documentary): Yalla Parkour by Areeb Zuaiter
- Hosted by: Supported by: The Hong Kong International Film Festival Society; Create Hong Kong
- Festival date: Opening: April 10, 2025; Closing: April 21, 2025
- Website: HKIFF 2025

Hong Kong International Film Festival
- 50th 48th

The 49th Hong Kong International Film Festival (Chinese: 第49屆香港國際電影節) took place from 10 April to 21 April 2025. Louis Koo was selected as the Filmmaker in Focus for this edition and masterclasses led by Albert Serra, Juho Kuosmanen, and Leos Carax were featured.

The festival opened with the Japanese crime film The Brightest Sun by Tetsuya Nakashima and the Malaysian-Hong Kong drama Pavane for an Infant by Chong Keat Aun, and closed with the Norwegian drama Dreams (Sex Love) by Dag Johan Haugerud. This year, 195 films from 69 countries were screened, including six world premieres, two international premieres, and fifty-two Asian premieres. Angela Yuen was chosen as the new ambassador of the HKIFF starting this edition, succeeding Karena Lam.

== Background ==
The theme of the 49th Hong Kong International Film Festival is "Dialogue - Conversation of Film". The festival's poster, designed by local company Trilingua Design, features sound tracks as the background, accompanied by classic quotes from international films. Angela Yuen was named the new ambassador of the Hong Kong International Film Festival in late January 2025 starting from this edition, succeeding Karena Lam. Louis Koo was announced as the Filmmaker in Focus for the festival on 7 February 2025. Albert Lee, the executive director of the Hong Kong International Film Festival Society, explained that Koo, who served as the HKIFF ambassador for five years starting in 2014, was chosen for both his acting career and filmmaking efforts through his production companies, which embody the essence of Hong Kong cinema to both the industry and the public. A commemorative book on Koo was published in collaboration with Moleskine.

Catalan filmmaker Albert Serra and Finnish filmmaker Juho Kuosmanen were announced as features in the Masterclass section later that month, with both presenting at the festival in person and marks Kuosmanen's first visit to Hong Kong. French filmmaker Leos Carax and Japanese actress Sakura Ando were also announced as features in the Masterclass and Focus section respectively in March. A full lineup was announced on 17 March 2025. Other notable guests at the festival included Chinese filmmakers Wang Bing, Vivian Qu, Japanese filmmaker Shinobu Yaguchi, and Taiwanese actor Lee Kang-sheng.

The film festival opened on 10 April 2024 at the Hong Kong Cultural Centre with the Japanese crime film The Brightest Sun by Tetsuya Nakashima and Malaysian-Hong Kong drama Pavane for an Infant by Chong Keat Aun. This edition was held later than usual, as the HKIFF typically starts in March, with Albert Lee cited the postponement of Art Basel Hong Kong, which also uses the Hong Kong Cultural Centre as its main venue, as the reason for the delay. Events took place at various venues, including the Hong Kong Cultural Centre, Hong Kong Arts Centre, Hong Kong City Hall, M+, and iSQUARE. A total of 195 films from 69 countries were screened, featuring six world premieres, two international premieres, and fifty-two Asian premieres. Ticket prices ranged from HKD$55 to $100. It was part of the Entertainment Expo Hong Kong, featuring events such as the 18th Asian Film Awards and the 43rd Hong Kong Film Awards taking place concurrently.

The multinational historical drama To Kill a Mongolian Horse by Jiang Xiaoxuan won the Firebird Award for the Young Cinema Competition (Chinese-language), while the Japanese-Taiwanese-American psychological thriller Black Ox by Tsuta Tetsuichiro won the Firebird Award for the Young Cinema Competition (World). The multinational documentary Yalla Parkour by Areeb Zuaiter received the Firebird Award for Documentary Competition, and the Chinese film The Botanist by Jing Yi won the FIPRESCI Prize. The festival closed with the Norwegian drama Dreams (Sex Love) by Dag Johan Haugerud on 21 April.

== Jury ==
The jury of the Firebird Awards comprises:

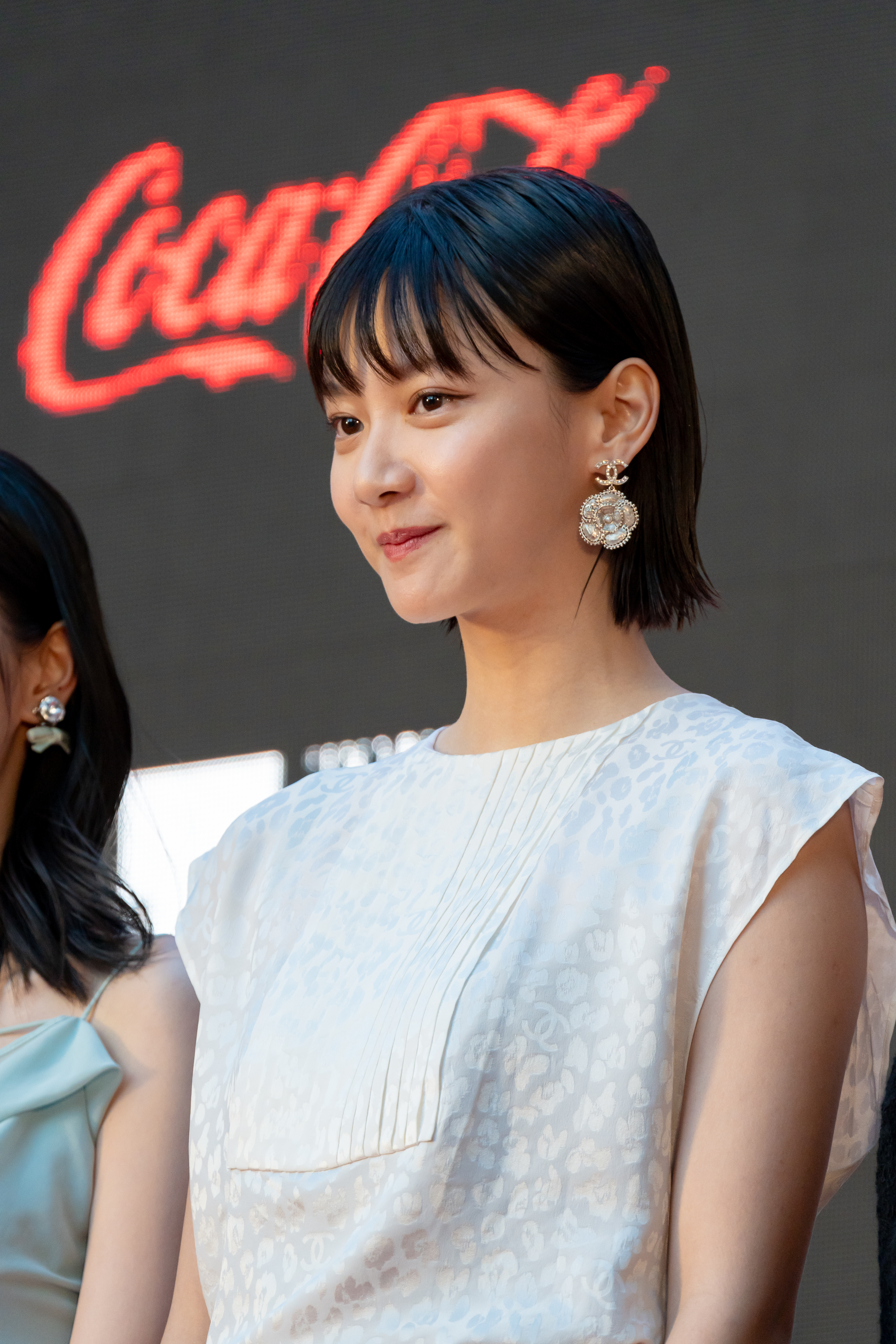
Angela Yuen, new HKIFF ambassador

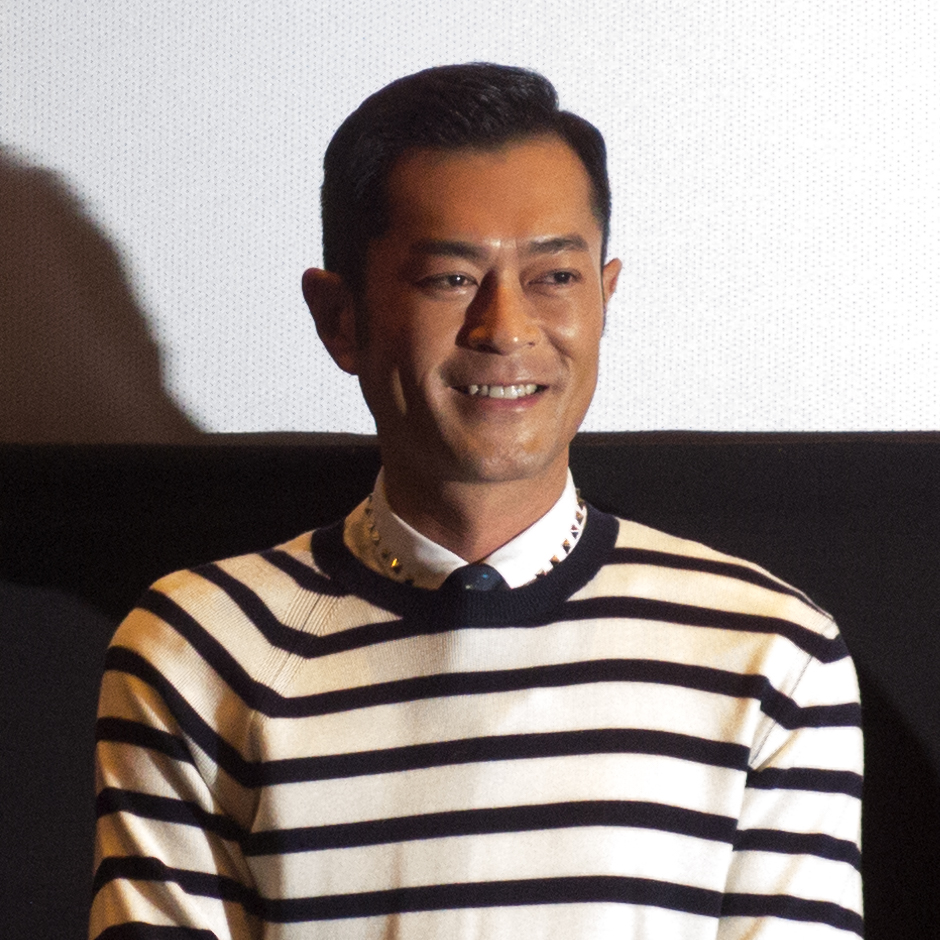
Louis Koo, Filmmaker in Focus

=== Young Cinema Competition (Chinese-language) ===
- Huang Ji, Chinese filmmaker
- Chong Keat Aun, Malaysian filmmaker
- Geng Jun, Chinese filmmaker

=== Young Cinema Competition (World) ===
- Juho Kuosmanen, Finnish filmmaker
- Ray Yeung, Hong Kong filmmaker
- Derek Lam, Hong Kong film critic

=== Documentary Competition ===
- Huang Hsin-yao, Taiwanese documentary filmmaker
- Otsuka Ryuji, Japanese documentary filmmaker
- Elena Pollacchi, former curator of the Venice International Film Festival

== Program sections ==
=== Opening and closing films ===
The following films were chosen as the opening and closing features of the film festival, marking the world premiere of The Brighest Sun:

English title	Original title	Director(s)	Production countrie(s)
Opening film
The Brightest Sun	時には懺悔を	Tetsuya Nakashima	Japan
Pavane for an Infant	搖籃凡世	Chong Keat Aun	Malaysia, Hong Kong
Closing film
Dreams (Sex Love)	Drømmer	Dag Johan Haugerud	Norway

=== Gala Presentation ===
Two Hong Kong films, which had only premiered at Busan International Film Festival and Tokyo International Film Festival in 2024, have been selected for screening in the Gala Presentation section:

English title	Original title	Director(s)	Production countrie(s)
Valley of the Shadow of Death	不赦之罪	Jeffrey Lam, Antonio Lam	Hong Kong
Montages of a Modern Motherhood	虎毒不	Oliver Chan	Hong Kong

=== Cinephile Paradise ===
The following films have been selected for screening in the Cinephile Paradise section:

English title	Original title	Director(s)	Production countrie(s)
April	აპრილი	Déa Kulumbegashvili	France, Italy, Georgia
Bel Ami	漂亮朋友	Geng Jun	China
The Girl with the Needle	Pigen med nålen	Magnus von Horn	Denmark, Poland, Sweden
Girls on Wire	想飞的女孩	Vivian Qu	China
Kill the Jockey	El jockey	Luis Ortega	Argentina, Mexico, Spain, Denmark, United States
Limonov: The Ballad	—N/a	Kirill Serebrennikov	Italy, France, Spain
Parthenope	—N/a	Paolo Sorrentino	Italy, France
Queer	—N/a	Luca Guadagnino	Italy, United States
Stranger Eyes	默視錄	Yeo Siew Hua	Singapore, Taiwan, France, United States
Teki Cometh	敵	Daihachi Yoshida	Japan
Vermiglio	—N/a	Maura Delpero	Italy, France, Belgium
When Fall Is Coming	Quand vient l'automne	François Ozon	France

=== Firebird Awards ===
==== Young Cinema Competition (Chinese-language) ====
The following films were selected to compete in the Young Cinema Competition (Chinese-language) at the Firebird Awards. To Kill a Mongolian Horse emerged as the winner, with Jing Yi awarded Best Director for The Botanist, Wang Ke named Best Actor for his role in All Quiet at Sunrise, while Wu Ke-xi and Xu Haipeng from Blue Sun Palace jointly received Best Actress for their performances.

English title	Original title	Director(s)	Production countrie(s)
All Quiet at Sunrise	世界日出時	Zhu Xin	China
Blue Sun Palace	藍色太陽宮	Constance Tsang	United States
The Botanist	植物學家	Jing Yi	China
Eel	河鰻	Chu Chun-teng	Taiwan
Green Wave	前程似錦	Xu Lei	China
My Friend An Delie	我的朋友安德烈	Dong Zijian	China
To Kill a Mongolian Horse	一匹白馬的熱夢	Jiang Xiaoxuan	Malaysia, Hong Kong, South Korea, Japan, United States
Valley of the Shadow of Death	不赦之罪	Jeffrey Lam, Antonio Lam	Hong Kong

==== Young Cinema Competition (World) ====
The following films were selected to compete in the Young Cinema Competition (World) at the Firebird Awards. Black Ox emerged as the winner, with Ernesto Martínez Bucio receiving Best Director for The Devil Smokes (and Saves the Burnt Matches in the Same Box), while Yunan's Georges Khabbaz and Hanna Schygulla were named Best Actor and Best Actress, respectively.

English title	Original title	Director(s)	Production countrie(s)
Black Ox	黒之牛	Tsuta Tetsuichiro	Japan, Taiwan, United States
The Devil Smokes (and Saves the Burnt Matches in the Same Box)	El diablo fuma	Ernesto Martínez Bucio	Mexico
Horizon	Horizonte	César Augusto Acevedo	Colombia, France, Luxembourg, Chile
Peacock	Pfau - Bin ich echt?	Bernhard Wenger	Austria, Germany
Perfumed with Mint	Moattar Binanaa	Muhammed Hamdy	Egypt, France, Tunisia
The Things You Kill	—N/a	Alireza Khatami	France, Poland, Canada, Turkey
Wondrous is the Silence of My Master	Otapanje vladara	Ivan Salatić	Montenegro, Italy, France, Croatia
Yunan	يونان	Ameer Fakher Eldin	Germany, Canada, Italy, Palestine

==== Documentary Competition ====
The following films were selected to compete in the Young Cinema Competition (Documentary) at the Firebird Awards. Yalla Parkour was selected as the winner, while Andres Veiel received the jury prize for his work on Riefenstahl.

English title	Original title	Director(s)	Production countrie(s)
An American Pastoral	Une pastorale américaine	Auberi Edler	France
The Guest	Gość	Zvika Gregory Portnoy, Zuzanna Solakiewicz	Poland, Qatar
Holding Liat	—N/a	Brandon Kramer	United States
Paul	—N/a	Denis Côté	Canada
Riefenstahl	—N/a	Andres Veiel	Germany
Seeds	—N/a	Brittany Shyne	United States
Songs of Slow Burning Earth	Pisni zemli, shcho povilno horyt'	Olha Zhurba	Ukraine, Denmark, Sweden, France
Yalla Parkour	—N/a	Areeb Zuaiter	Sweden, Qatar, Saudi Arabia, Palestine

=== Pan-Chinese Cinema ===
==== Filmmaker in Focus ====
Louis Koo was announced as the Filmmaker in Focus for the film festival on 7 February 2025, showcasing ten of his previous works.

English title	Original title	Director(s)	Year of release	Production countrie(s)
The Suspect	極度重犯	Ringo Lam	1998	Hong Kong
Bullets Over Summer	爆裂刑警	Wilson Yip	1999	Hong Kong
Naked Ambition	豪情	Dante Lam	2003	Hong Kong
Throw Down	柔道龍虎榜	Johnnie To	2004	Hong Kong
Run Papa Run	一個好爸爸	Sylvia Chang	2008	Hong Kong
Connected	保持通話	Benny Chan	2008	Hong Kong
Accident	意外	Soi Cheang	2009	Hong Kong
Drug War	毒戰	Johnnie To	2012	Hong Kong
Paradox	殺破狼・貪狼	Wilson Yip	2017	Hong Kong
Warriors of Future	明日戰記	Ng Yuen-fai	2022	Hong Kong

=== Masters and Auteurs ===
==== The Masters ====
The following films were selected for screening in the Masterclass section:

English title	Original title	Director(s)	Production countrie(s)
By the Stream	수유천	Hong Sang-soo	South Korea
Hard Truths	—N/a	Mike Leigh	United Kingdom, Spain
I'm Still Here	Ainda Estou Aqui	Walter Salles	Brazil, France
Iron	Dzelzs	Vitaly Mansky	Latvia, Ukraine, Czech Republic
Megalopolis	—N/a	Francis Ford Coppola	United States
Phantosmia	—N/a	Lav Diaz	Philippines
Scénarios / Exposé du film annonce	—N/a	Jean-Luc Godard	France
Separated	—N/a	Errol Morris	United States, Mexico
Youth (Spring)	青春（春）	Wang Bing	France, Luxembourg, Netherlands
Youth (Hard Times)	青春（苦）	Wang Bing	France, Luxembourg, Netherlands
Youth (Homecoming)	青春（歸）	Wang Bing	France, Luxembourg, Netherlands

==== Leos Carax: The Glamour of Decadence ====
The following films were selected for screening in the Masterclass section:

English title	Original title	Director(s)	Year of release	Production countrie(s)
The Night Is Young	Mauvais Sang	Leos Carax	1986	France
Les Amants du Pont-Neuf	—N/a	Leos Carax	1991	France
Annette	—N/a	Leos Carax	2021	France, Germany, Belgium, United States, Japan, Mexico, Switzerland
It's Not Me	C'est pas moi	Leos Carax	2024	France

==== The Subversive Cinema of Albert Serra ====
The following films were selected for screening in the Masterclass section:

English title	Original title	Director(s)	Year of release	Production countrie(s)
Honor of the Knights	Honor de cavalleria	Albert Serra	2006	Spain
Birdsong	El cant dels ocells	Albert Serra	2008	Spain
Story of My Death	Història de la meva mort	Albert Serra	2013	Spain, France, Romania
Liberté	—N/a	Albert Serra	2019	Spain, France, Germany, Portugal
Pacifiction	—N/a	Albert Serra	2022	Spain, France, Germany, Portugal
Afternoons of Solitude	Tardes de soledad	Albert Serra	2024	Spain, France, Portugal

==== The Empathetic Touch of Juho Kuosmanen ====
The following films were selected for screening in the Masterclass section:

English title	Original title	Director(s)	Year of release	Production countrie(s)
The Happiest Day in the Life of Olli Mäki	Hymyilevä mies	Juho Kuosmanen	2016	Finland
Compartment No. 6	Hytti nro 6	Juho Kuosmanen	2021	Finland, Germany, Estonia, Russia
Silent Trilogy	Mykkätrilogia	Juho Kuosmanen	2024	Finland

==== Les Auteurs ====
The following films have been selected for screening in the Les Auteurs section:

English title	Original title	Director(s)	Production countrie(s)
The Blue Trail	O Último Azul	Gabriel Mascaro	Brazil, Mexico, Chile, Netherlands
The Damned	—N/a	Roberto Minervini	Italy, United States, Belgium, Canada
Eight Postcards from Utopia	Opt ilustrate din lumea ideală	Radu Jude, Christian Ferencz-Flatz	Romania
Kontinental '25	—N/a	Radu Jude	Romania
Ernest Cole: Lost and Found	—N/a	Raoul Peck	United States, France
The Invasion	—N/a	Sergei Loznitsa	Netherlands, France, United States
Misericordia	Miséricorde	Alain Guiraudie	France, Spain, Portugal
An Urban Allegory	Allégorie citadine	Alice Rohrwacher, JR	France
Sex	—N/a	Dag Johan Haugerud	Norway
Love	Kjærlighet	Dag Johan Haugerud	Norway
Dreams (Sex Love)	Drømmer	Dag Johan Haugerud	Norway

=== Global Vision ===
The following films have been selected for screening in the Global Vision section:

English title	Original title	Director(s)	Production countrie(s)
Asia
The Land of Morning Calm	아침바다 갈매기는	Park Ri-woong	South Korea
Santosh	—N/a	Sandhya Suri	India, France, United Kingdom, Germany
Super Happy Forever	—N/a	Kohei Igarashi	France, Japan
Viet and Nam	Trong lòng đất	Minh Quý Trương	Vietnam
Europe
Diciannove	—N/a	Giovanni Tortorici	Italy, United Kingdom
Drowning Dry	Sesės	Laurynas Bareiša	Latvia, Lithuania
Ghost Trail	Les Fantômes	Jonathan Millet	France, Germany, Belgium
Harvest	—N/a	Athina Rachel Tsangari	United Kingdom, Germany, Greece, France, United States
The New Year That Never Came	Anul Nou care n-a fost	Bogdan Mureșanu	Romania, Serbia
Of Dogs and Men	על כלבים ואנשים	Dani Rosenberg	Israel
On Falling	—N/a	Laura Carreira	United Kingdom, Portugal
Quiet Life	—N/a	Alexandros Avranas	France, Germany, Sweden, Estonia, Greece
Souleymane's Story	L'Histoire de Souleymane	Boris Lojkine	France
The Sparrow in the Chimney	Der Spatz im Kamin	Ramon Zürcher	Switzerland
To a Land Unknown	—N/a	Mahdi Fleifel	United Kingdom, Germany, France, Greece
Toxic	Akiplėša	Saulė Bliuvaitė	Lithuania
The Trail Left by Time	Los restos del pasar	Luis Soto Muñoz, Alfredo Picazo	Spain
Waves	Vlny	Jiří Mádl	Czech Republic, Slovakia
America
Baby	—N/a	Marcelo Caetano	Brazil, France, Netherlands
Beloved Tropic	Querido Trópico	Ana Endara	Panama, Colombia
Carnival Is Over	Os Enforcados	Fernando Coimbra	Brazil, Portugal
The Message	El mensaje	Iván Fund	Argentina, Spain, Uruguay
Something Old, Something New, Something Borrowed	—N/a	Hernán Rosselli	Argentina, Portugal, Spain
Universal Language	Une langue universelle	Matthew Rankin	Canada
Africa
Everybody Loves Touda	في حب تودا	Nabil Ayouch	France, Morocco, Belgium, Denmark
On Becoming a Guinea Fowl	—N/a	Rungano Nyoni	Zambia, United Kingdom, Ireland

=== Fantastic Beats ===
The following films have been selected for screening in the Fantastic Beats section, marking the world premiere of the Japanese romance film Sato and Sato.

English title	Original title	Director(s)	Production countrie(s)
Unreachable	片思い世界	Nobuhiro Doi	Japan
She Taught Me Serendipity	今⽇の空が⼀番好き、とまだ⾔えない僕は	Akiko Ōku	Japan
Sato and Sato	佐藤さんと佐藤さん	Chihiro Amano	Japan
The Red Envelope	ซองแดงแต่งผี	Chayanop Boonprakob	Thailand
Bird	—N/a	Andrea Arnold	United Kingdom, France
Kneecap	—N/a	Rich Peppiatt	United Kingdom, Ireland
Angry Squad: The Civil Servant and the Seven Swindlers	アングリースクワッド 公務員と7人の詐欺師	Ueda Shinichiro	Japan
Ravens	—N/a	Mark Gill	Japan, France, Belgium, Spain

=== Restored Classics ===
Eight restored film classics from various eras and regions were selected for showcase at the festival:

English title	Original title	Director(s)	Year of release	Production countrie(s)
The Wind	—N/a	Victor Sjöström	1928	United States
Man's Castle	—N/a	Frank Borzage	1933	United States
Pépé le Moko	—N/a	Julien Duvivier	1937	France
Seven Samurai	七人の侍	Akira Kurosawa	1954	Japan
Murdering the Devil	Vražda ing. Čerta	Ester Krumbachová	1970	Czechoslovakia
Bona	—N/a	Lino Brocka	1980	Philippines
Tasio	—N/a	Montxo Armendáriz	1984	Spain
The Sweet Hereafter	—N/a	Atom Egoyan	1997	Canada

=== Focus ===
==== Ando Sakura: A Beautiful Metamorphosis ====
The following films which starred Japanese actress Sakura Ando were selected for screening in the Focus section:

English title	Original title	Director(s)	Year of release	Production countrie(s)
0.5 mm	0.5ミリ	Momoko Andō	2014	Japan
100 Yen Love	百円の恋	Masaharu Take	2014	Japan
Shoplifters	万引き家族	Hirokazu Kore-eda	2018	Japan
Bad Lands	バッド・ランズ	Masato Harada	2023	Japan
