= Snow in Midsummer (film) =

2023 Malaysian film

- Film poster
- 五月雪
- Directed by: Chong Keat Aun
- Written by: Chong Keat Aun
- Produced by: Wong Kew Soon; Chow Wai Thong; Jennifer Jao; Gene Yao
- Starring: Wan Fang; Pearlly Chua; Rexen Cheng; Pauline Tan; Peter Yu; Alvin Wong
- Cinematography: Hsu Chih-Chun
- Edited by: Goh Ai Chen
- Music by: Yii Kah Hoe; Chong Keat Aun
- Production companies: SunStrong Entertainment: August Pictures; TAICCA; Taipei Film Commission; Janji Pictures; Swallow Wings Films
- Release dates: September 4, 2023 (Venice); November 9, 2023 (GHFF); November 17, 2023 (Taiwan); May 9, 2024 (Hong Kong); July 18, 2024 (Malaysia)
- Running time: 116 minutes
- Countries: Malaysia; Singapore; Taiwan
- Languages: Cantonese; Hokkien; Malay; Mandarin

Snow in Midsummer (Chinese: 五月雪; pinyin: Wǔ Yuè Xuě) is a 2023 Malaysian historical drama film directed by Chong Keat Aun, starring Wan Fang, Pearlly Chua, Rexen Cheng, Peter Yu and Pauline Tan. The film premiered at the 80th Venice International Film Festival in the Giornate degli Autori section, where it received a Special Mention of the Golden Musa Cinema & Arts Award.

Snow in Midsummer led the 60th Golden Horse Awards with nine nominations, including Best Narrative Feature, Best Director and Best Supporting Actress. It went on to win the Firebird Award for Best Film at the 48th Hong Kong International Film Festival, as well as the Uncaged Award for Best Feature Film at the 23rd New York Asian Film Festival.

== Premise ==
Snow in Midsummer is set in Kuala Lumpur at two different periods of time: first on May 13, 1969, and then, on May 13, 2018; it revolves around Ah Eng, a young woman, and her mother who lose contact with the father and brother of the first amid political riots, in the first part, and, in a second chapter, the remembrance of this moment 49 years later.

== Cast ==
- Wan Fang as Ah Eng
- Pearlly Chua as Dou E
- Rexen Cheng as Hokkien Boy
- Pauline Tan as Eng's mother
- Peter Yu as Kooi
- Alvin Wong as Fong

== Production ==
Snow in Midsummer is a Malaysia–Singapore–Taiwan co-production and marks Chong Keat Aun’s second feature film, following The Story of Southern Islet (2020). The film is executive produced by Jment Lim, founder of SunStrong Entertainment and Chow Wai Thong, founder of August Pictures.

The project received early recognition with the ‘French CNC Cash Award’ at the 2020 Golden Horse Film Project Promotion, and was supported by the Singapore Film Commission (SFC)’s Southeast Asia Co-production Grant (SCPG), TAICCA's Taiwan International Co-funding Programme (TICP) and the Taipei Film Fund from the Taipei Film Commission (TFC).

Principal photography was completed in August 2022.

== Awards and nominations ==
Year	Award	Category	Nominated work	Result	Ref.
2023	80th Venice International Film Festival	Golden Musa Cinema & Arts Award Special Mention	Snow in Midsummer	Won	
2023	60th Golden Horse Awards	Best Narrative Feature	Snow in Midsummer	Nominated	
2023	60th Golden Horse Awards	Best Director	Chong Keat Aun	Nominated	
2023	60th Golden Horse Awards	Best Supporting Actress	Wanfang	Nominated	
2023	60th Golden Horse Awards	Best Adapted Screenplay	Chong Keat Aun	Nominated	
2023	60th Golden Horse Awards	Best Cinematography	Jerry Hsu	Nominated	
2023	60th Golden Horse Awards	Best Makeup & Costume Design	Elaine Ng	Nominated	
2023	60th Golden Horse Awards	Best Original Film Score	Yii Kah-hoe and Chong Keat Aun	Nominated	
2023	60th Golden Horse Awards	Best Original Film Song	"May Threnody"; Composer: Aki Huang; Lyrics: Chong Keat Aun; Performer: Wanfang	Nominated	
2023	60th Golden Horse Awards	Best Sound Effects	Tu Duu-chih, Wu Shu-yao and Chen Kuan-ting	Won	
2024	17th Asian Film Awards	Best Supporting Actress	Wanfang	Nominated	
2024	17th Asian Film Awards	Best Costume Design	Elaine Ng	Nominated	
2024	17th Asian Film Awards	Best Sound	Tu Duu-chih and Wu Shu-yao	Nominated	
2024	48th Hong Kong International Film Festival	Best Film - Young Cinema Competition - Firebird Awards (Chinese Language)	Snow in Midsummer	Won	
2024	23rd New York Asian Film Festival	Uncaged Award for Best Feature Film	Snow in Midsummer	Won	
2025	Kuala Lumpur Film Critics' Awards (Anugerah MPFKL)	Best Film	Snow in Midsummer	Won	
2025	Kuala Lumpur Film Critics' Awards (Anugerah MPFKL)	Best Director	Chong Keat Aun	Nominated	
2025	Kuala Lumpur Film Critics' Awards (Anugerah MPFKL)	Best Actress	Wanfang	Nominated	
2025	Kuala Lumpur Film Critics' Awards (Anugerah MPFKL)	Best Supporting Actress	Pearlly Chua	Nominated	
2025	Kuala Lumpur Film Critics' Awards (Anugerah MPFKL)	Best Screenplay	Chong Keat Aun	Won	
2025	Kuala Lumpur Film Critics' Awards (Anugerah MPFKL)	Best Cinematography	Jerry Hsu	Nominated	

== Themes ==
=== Historical and political background ===
Snow in Midsummer deals with the 13 May incident.

=== Chinese Opera ===
The film is also described as follows: "Perhaps best of all, it’s a loving depiction of traditional Chinese opera, with the first part of the film set among the milieu of live performance and the second part paying a wistful tribute to the art form."

The two chapters of the films are associated with a classic Chinese play of the Yuan dynasty, that gives its title to the film, Snow in Midsummer (also commonly referred to as The Injustice to You E or Snow in June and later adapted into opera). The play explores the themes of corrupt powers and wrongful legal decisions. In an interview, Chong Keat Aun underlined the connection between the political background and the presence of the play in the film: "The Chinese opera “Snow in June” holds significant importance in the film’s narrative. Chong Keat Aun explains that on that fateful night in May, an opera singer died and was buried in the same cemetery. During his research, he discovered a member of that opera troupe who revealed that they were performing “Snow in June,” an ancient story dating back to the Ming Dynasty. This story revolves around women who suffer abuse and escape their hometown, making a solemn vow: if they are truly innocent, snow will fall even in the summertime. Chong Keat Aun sought to intertwine the film’s narrative with that of the opera, creating a layered and poignant storytelling experience."

== Reception ==
Snow in Midsummer received positive reviews. A review at Loud and Clear stated "Undoubtedly, Snow in Midsummer is going to be more impactful for those in the audience who know about the May 13 acts of violence in Kuala Lumpur and may have a strong cultural memory of the event. Nonetheless, the impressive sound design and camerawork allow us to sympathize with this historical event through the eyes of the main character. The film is heartbreaking in its recollection of such a significant moment in Malaysian politics, one that the general public should know more about since it has such an impact on our present, as the film so brilliantly shows us with its time jump to 2018. " Another review compared the film to Hou Hsiao-hsien's A City of Sadness while a third stated, "Snow in Midsummer leaves behind the lavish reconstitution of the past, for an approach closer to the cinema of Apichatpong Weerasethakul (the scene with the mobile excavator disturbing the resting place of ghosts is a clear reference to his masterpiece Cemetery of Splendour), halfway between harsh reality and strong spirituality. The emotions conveyed are just as powerful in both cases, whatever the era displayed and the pictorial approach opted for.' An independent reviewer praised the slow pace but astute sense of rhythm of the film, and the simplicity and strength of the plot
