= Golden Horse Award for Best New Director =

Taiwanese film award

- The 2026 recipient: Shu Qi
- Awarded for: Best Directorial Debut
- Country: Taiwan
- Presented by: Taipei Golden Horse Film Festival Executive Committee
- First award: 2010
- Currently held by: Shu Qi for Girl (2025)
- Website: goldenhorse.org.tw

The Golden Horse Award for Best New Director (Chinese: 金馬獎最佳新導演) is presented annually at Taiwan's Golden Horse Film Awards.

== Winners and nominees ==
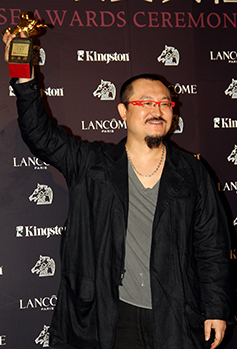
Wuershan won in 2011 for The Butcher, the Chef and the Swordsman.

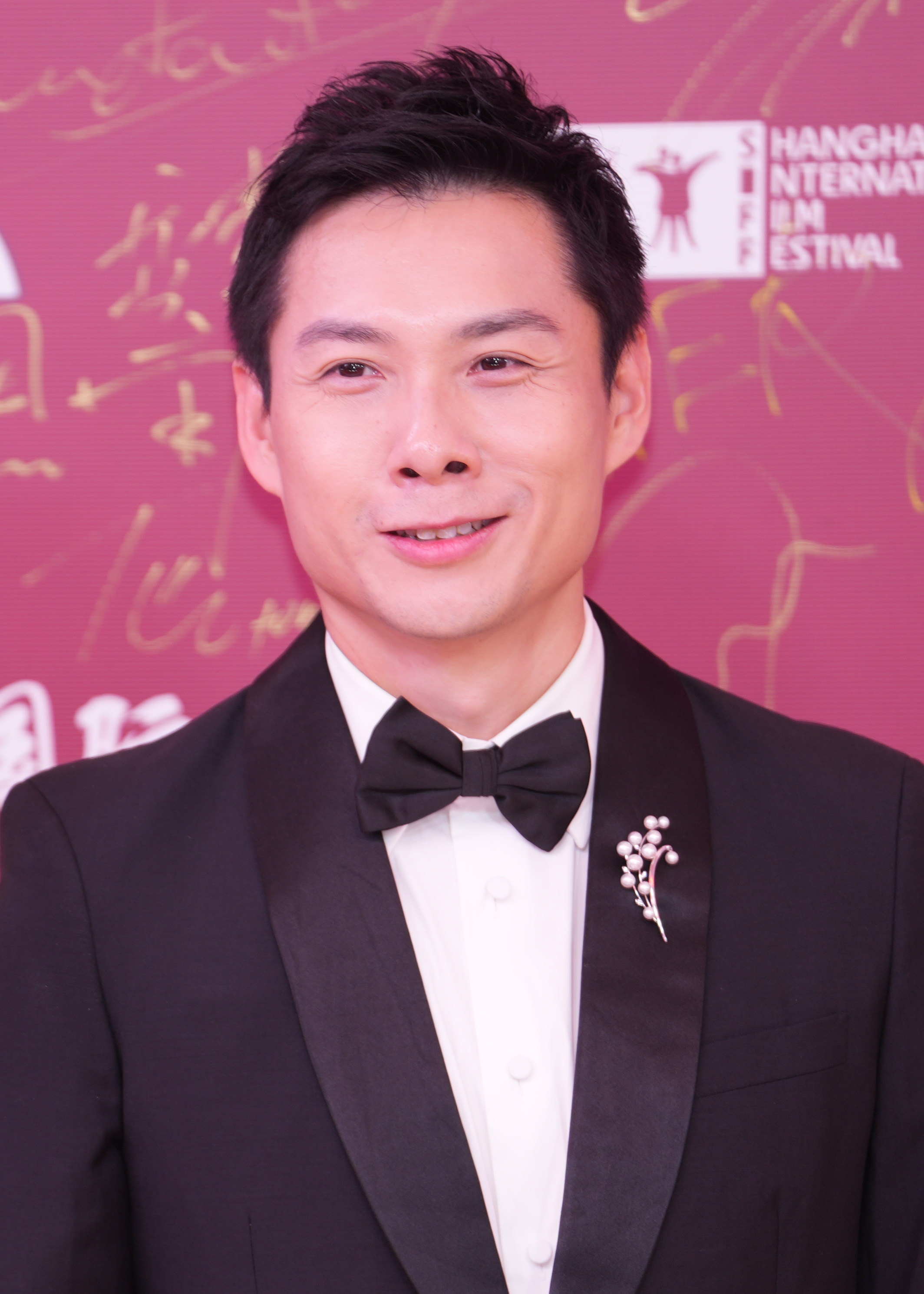
Anthony Chen won in 2013 for Ilo Ilo.

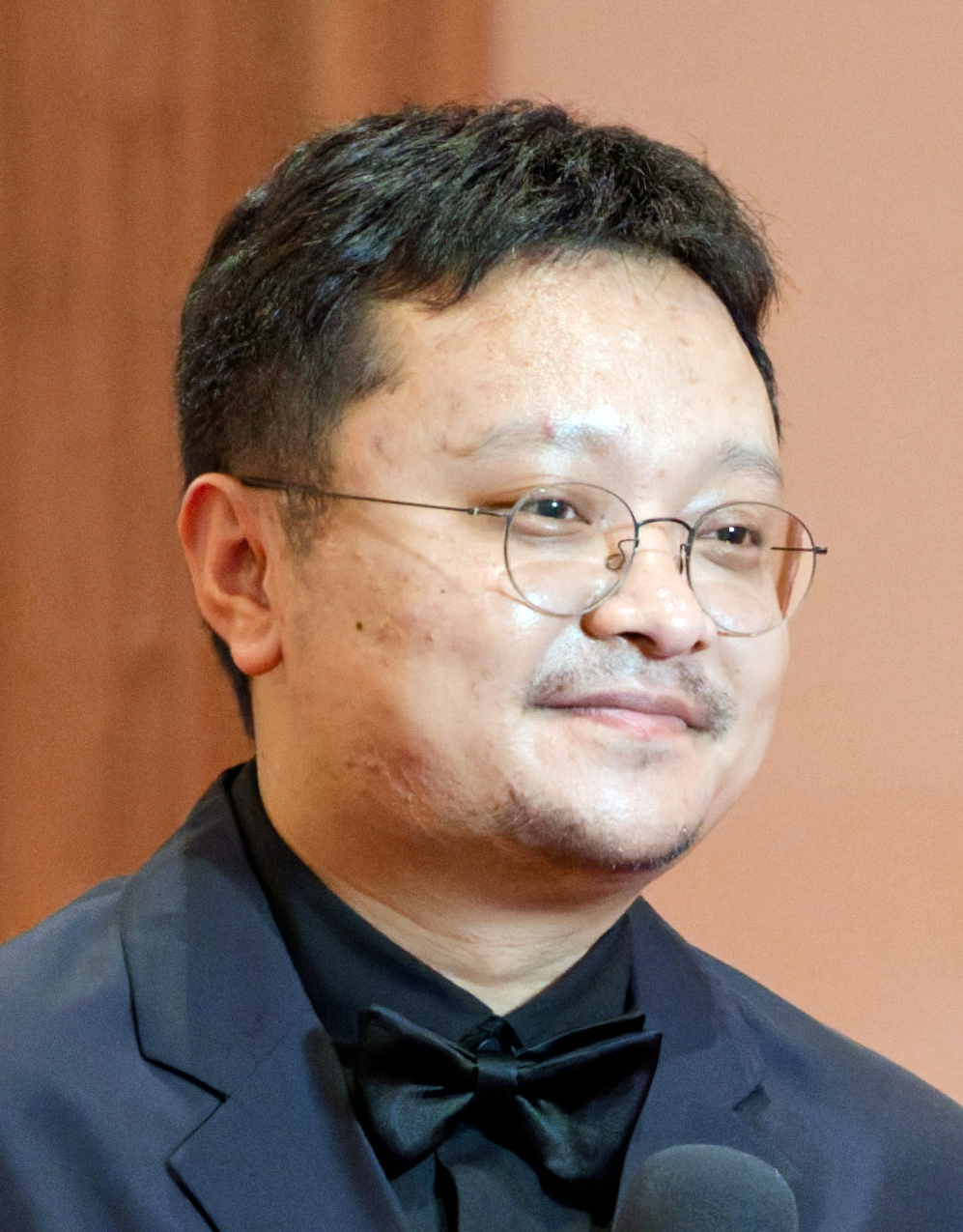
Bi Gan won in 2015 for Kaili Blues.

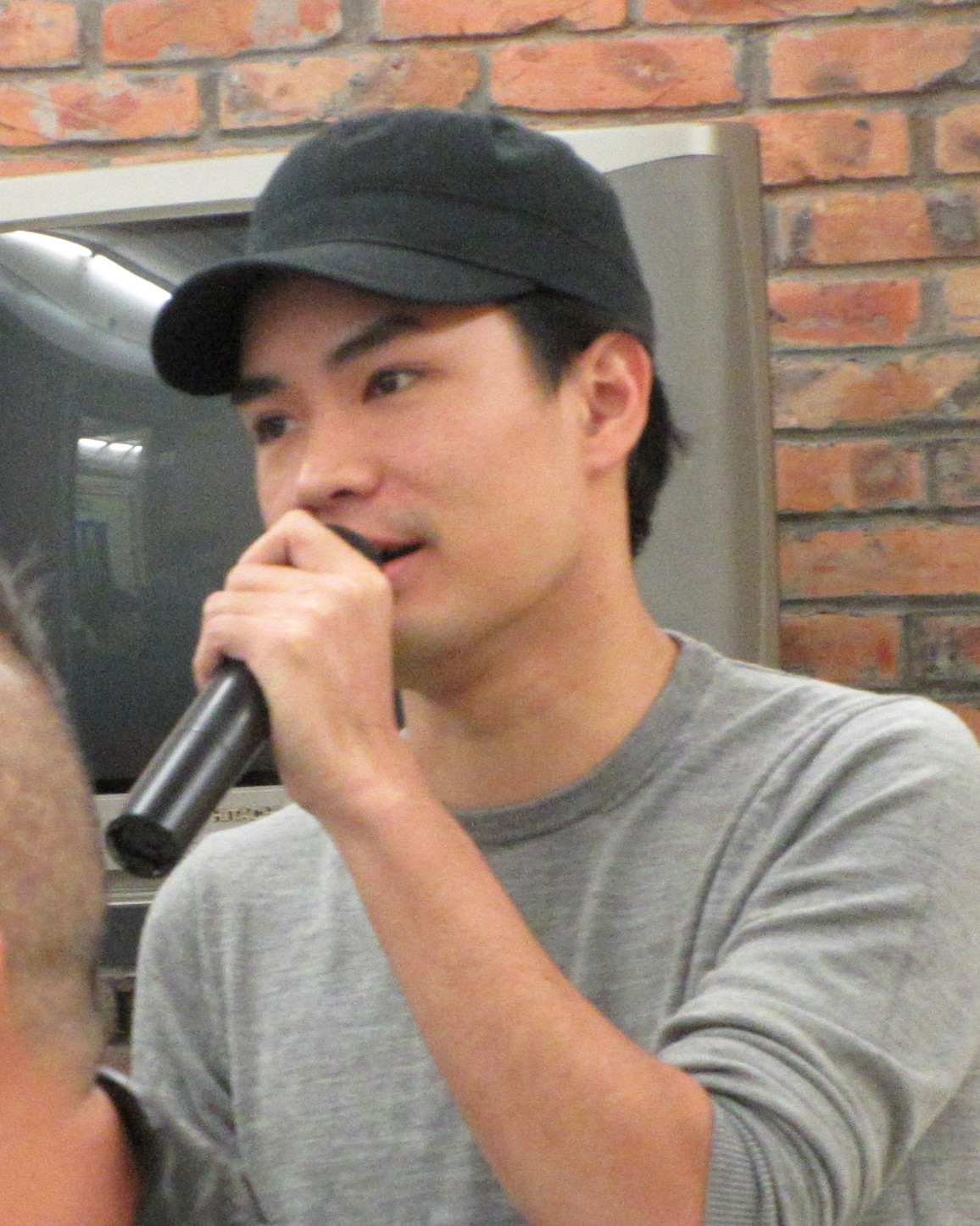
Wong Chun won in 2016 for Mad World.

Huang Hsin-yao won in 2017 for The Great Buddha+.

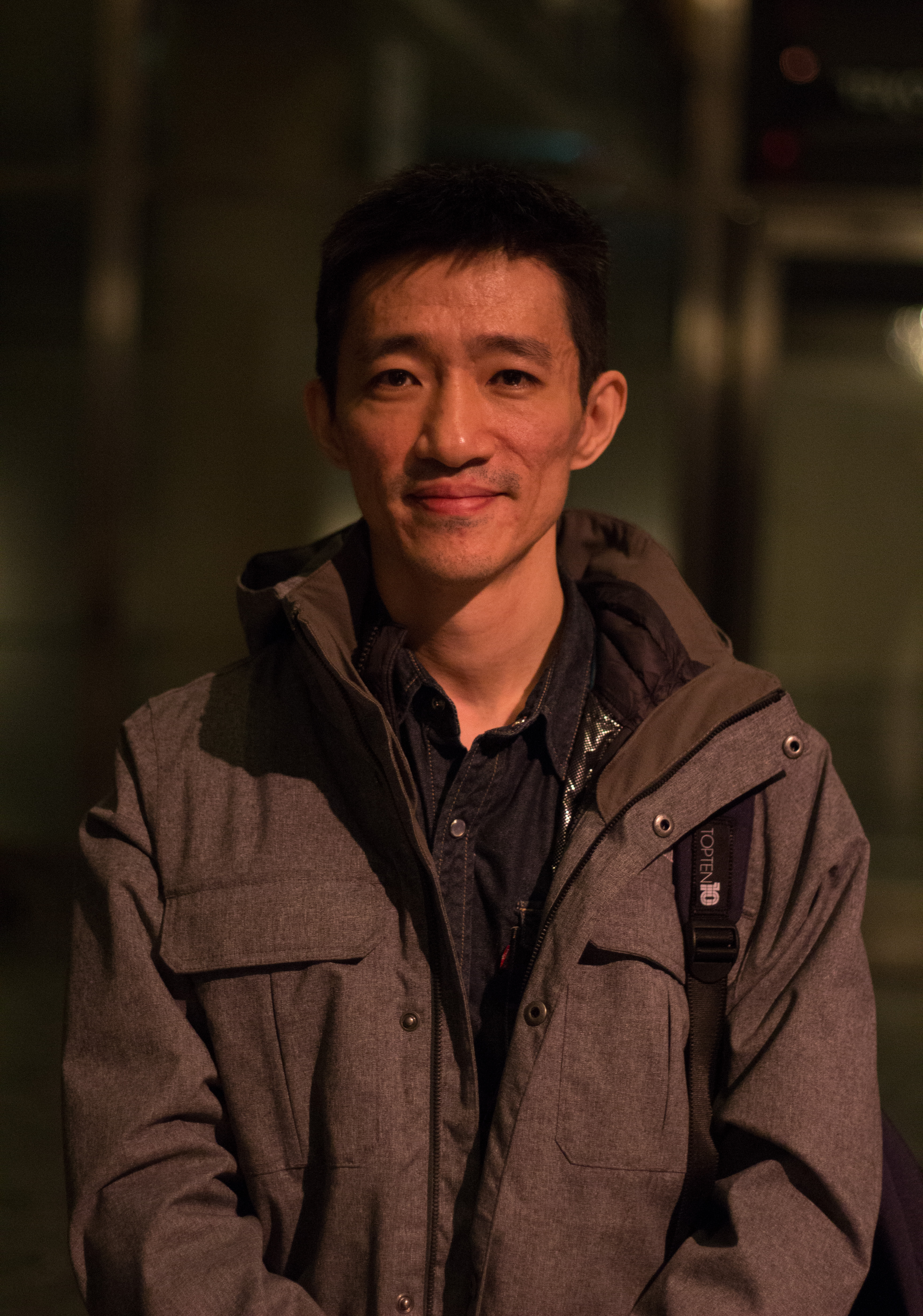
John Hsu won in 2019 for Detention.

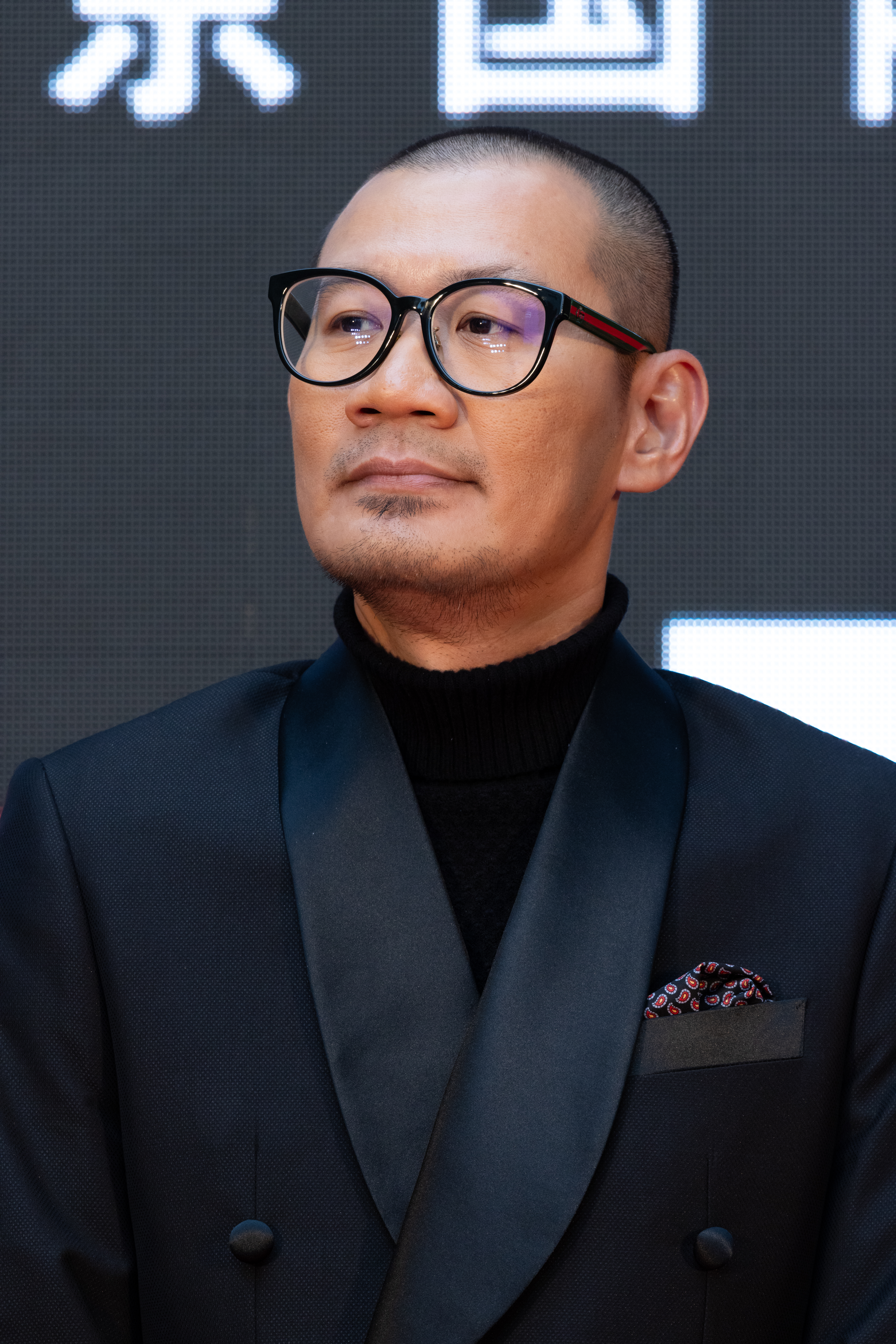
Chong Keat Aun won in 2020 for The Story of Southern Islet.

Feng-I Fiona Roan won in 2021 for American Girl.

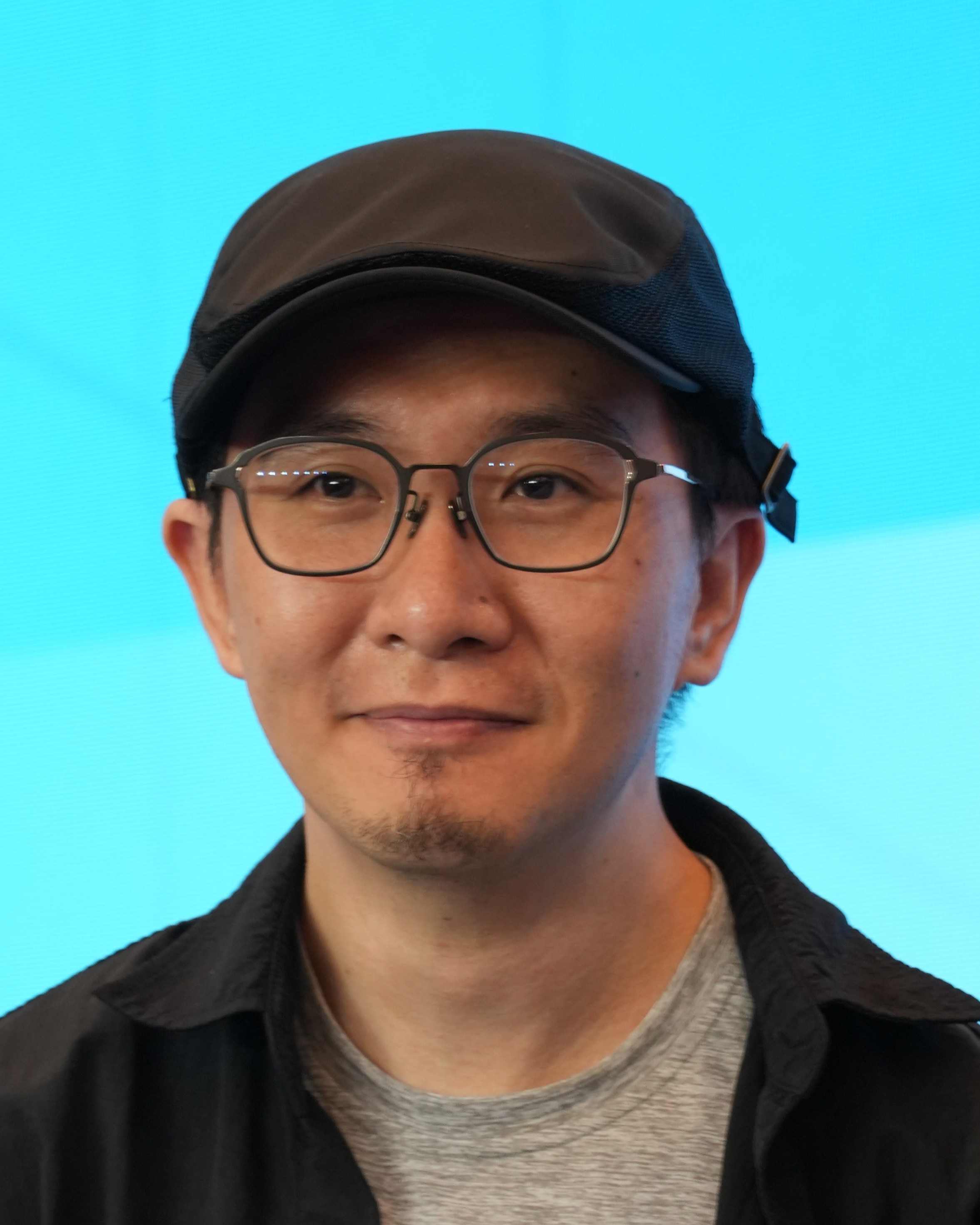
Nick Cheuk won in 2023 for Time Still Turns the Pages.

Chiang Wei Liang, 2024 co-winner.

Yin You-qiao, 2024 co-winner.

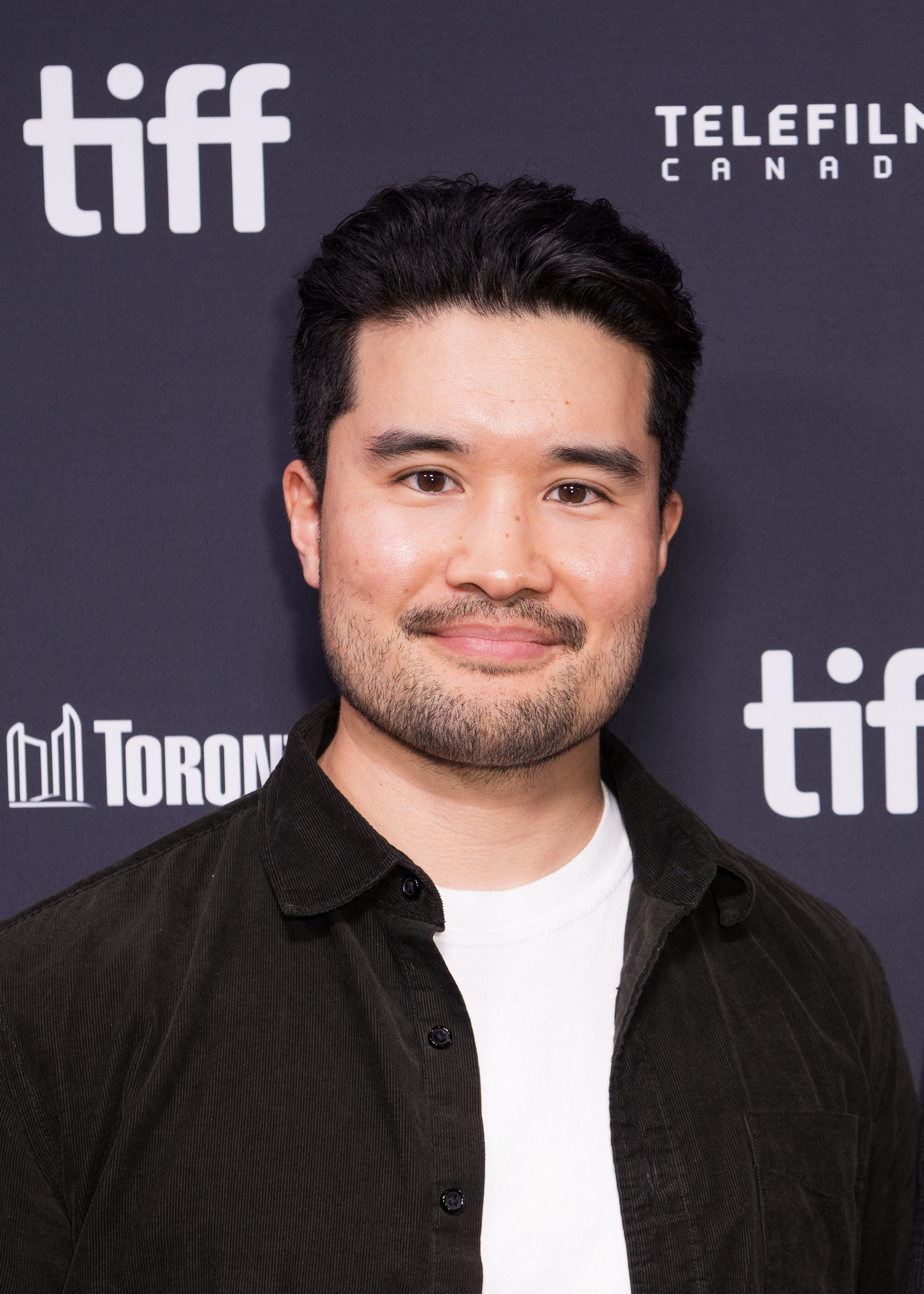
Lloyd Lee Choi won in 2025 for Lucky Lu.

indicates the winner

=== 2010s ===
Year	Director(s)	English title	Original title
2010 (47th)	Ho Wi-ding	Pinoy Sunday	台北星期天
2010 (47th)	Li Weiran	Welcome to Shama Town	決戰剎馬鎮
2010 (47th)	Hou Chi-jan	One Day	有一天
2010 (47th)	Derek Tsang and Jimmy Wan	Lover's Discourse	戀人絮語
2011 (48th)	Wuershan	The Butcher, the Chef and the Swordsman	刀見笑
2011 (48th)	Giddens Ko	You Are the Apple of My Eye	那些年，我們一起追的女孩
2011 (48th)	Xu Haofeng	The Sword Identity	倭寇的蹤跡
2011 (48th)	Du Jiayi	Kora	轉山
2012 (49th)	Chang Jung-chi	Touch of the Light	逆光飛翔
2012 (49th)	Yang Yi-chien and Jim Wang	Cha Cha for Twins	寶米恰恰
2012 (49th)	Fung Kai	Din Tao: Leader of the Parade	陣頭
2012 (49th)	Hero Lin	Silent Code	BBS鄉民的正義
2012 (49th)	Tsai Yueh-hsun	Black & White Episode I: The Dawn of Assault	痞子英雄之全面開戰
2013 (50th)	Anthony Chen	Ilo Ilo	爸媽不在家
2013 (50th)	Zhao Wei	So Young	致我們終將逝去的青春
2013 (50th)	Longman Leung and Sunny Luk	Cold War	寒戰
2013 (50th)	Juno Mak	Rigor Mortis	殭屍
2013 (50th)	Hsu Chao-jen	Together	甜·祕密
2014 (51st)	Chen Jianbin	A Fool	一個勺子
2014 (51st)	Chienn Hsiang	Exit	迴光奏鳴曲
2014 (51st)	Xin Yukun	The Coffin in the Mountain	心迷宮
2014 (51st)	Umin Boya	Kano	KANO
2014 (51st)	Li Xiaofeng	Nezha	少女哪吒
2015 (52nd)	Bi Gan	Kaili Blues	路边野餐
2015 (52nd)	Lee Chung	The Laundryman	青田街一號
2015 (52nd)	Alec Su	The Left Ear	左耳
2015 (52nd)	Xiang Guoqiang	Young Love Lost	少年巴比倫
2015 (52nd)	Frankie Chen	Our Times	我的少女時代
2016 (53rd)	Wong Chun	Mad World	一念無明
2016 (53rd)	Frank Hui, Jevons Au and Vicky Wong	Trivisa	樹大招風
2016 (53rd)	Chu Hsien-che	White Ant	白蟻-慾望謎網
2016 (53rd)	Zhang Dalei	The Summer Is Gone	八月
2016 (53rd)	Cheng Wei-hao	The Tag-Along	紅衣小女孩
2017 (54th)	Huang Hsin-yao	The Great Buddha+	大佛普拉斯
2017 (54th)	Huang Xi	Missing Johnny	強尼·凱克
2017 (54th)	Tan Seng Kiat	Shuttle Life	分貝人生
2017 (54th)	Zhou Ziyang	Old Beast	老獸
2017 (54th)	Chan Ching-lin	The Island That All Flow By	川流之島
2018 (55th)	Wen Muye	Dying to Survive	我不是藥神
2018 (55th)	Hsu Chih-yen and Mag Hsu	Dear Ex	誰先愛上他的
2018 (55th)	Rene Liu	Us and Them	後來的我們
2018 (55th)	Hu Bo	An Elephant Sitting Still	大象席地而坐
2018 (55th)	Dong Yue	The Looming Storm	暴雪將至
2019 (56th)	John Hsu	Detention	返校
2019 (56th)	Hung Tzu-hsuan	The Scoundrels	狂徒
2019 (56th)	Jack Hsu	The Last Thieves	聖人大盜
2019 (56th)	Wong Yee-lam	My Prince Edward	金都
2019 (56th)	Lau Kek-huat, Vera Chen	Boluomi	波羅蜜

=== 2020s ===
Year	Director(s)	English title	Original title	Ref.
2020 (57th)	Chong Keat Aun	The Story of Southern Islet	南巫	
2020 (57th)	Chan Kin-long	Hand Rolled Cigarette	手捲煙	
2020 (57th)	Liao Ming-yi	I WeirDo	怪胎	
2020 (57th)	Joseph Hsu Chen-chieh	Little Big Women	孤味	
2020 (57th)	Ko Chen-nien	The Silent Forest	無聲	
2021 (58th)	Fiona Roan Feng-i	American Girl	美國女孩	
2021 (58th)	C.B. Yi	Moneyboys	金錢男孩Moneyboys	
2021 (58th)	Rex Ren, Lam Sum	May You Stay Forever Young	少年	
2021 (58th)	Yin Chen-hao	Man in Love	當男人戀愛時	
2021 (58th)	Hsu Fu-hsiang	Treat or Trick	詭扯	
2022 (59th)	Lau Kok Rui	The Sunny Side of the Street	白日青春	
2022 (59th)	He Shuming	Ajoomma	花路阿朱媽	
2022 (59th)	Kai Ko	Bad Education	黑的教育	
2022 (59th)	Tseng Ying-ting	The Abandoned	查無此心	
2022 (59th)	Hong Heng-fai	Kissing the Ground You Walked On	海鷗來過的房間	
2023 (60th)	Nick Cheuk	Time Still Turns the Pages	年少日記	
2023 (60th)	Lee Hong-chi	Love Is a Gun	愛是一把槍	
2023 (60th)	Jin Ong	Abang Adik	富都青年	
2023 (60th)	Alan Zhang	This Woman	这个女人	
2023 (60th)	Sun Jie	The Mountain Is Coming	大山來了	
2024 (61st)	Chiang Wei-liang, Yin You-qiao	Mongrel	白衣蒼狗	
2024 (61st)	Qiu Yang	Some Rain Must Fall	空房間裡的女人	
2024 (61st)	Ye Xingyu	Three Castrated Goats	三個羯子	
2024 (61st)	Ho Miu-ki	Love Lies	我談的那場戀愛	
2024 (61st)	Peng Tzu-hui, Wang Ping-wen	A Journey in Spring	春行	
2025 (62nd)	Lloyd Lee Choi	Lucky Lu		
2025 (62nd)	Shen Ko-shang	Deep Quiet Room	深度安靜	
2025 (62nd)	Shih-Ching Tsou	Left-Handed Girl	左撇子女孩	
2025 (62nd)	Pan Ke-yin	Family Matters	我家的事	
2025 (62nd)	Tan Siyou	Amoeba	核	
2026 (63rd)	Shu Qi	Girl	女孩	
2026 (63rd)	Ang Geck Geck Priscilla	Ah Girl	泡泡糖女孩	
2026 (63rd)	Michelle Zhou	Big Little Things	謊言生活	
2026 (63rd)	Shieh Meng-ju	Mudborn	泥娃娃	
2026 (63rd)	Yeung Leung Chuen	We Are Born Good	善男信女	

== See also ==
- Asian Film Award for Best New Director
- Caméra d'Or
- Hong Kong Film Award for Best New Director
