= Pavane for an Infant =

2024 Malaysian-Hong Kong film by Chong Keat Aun

- Tokyo International Film Festival poster
- Traditional Chinese: 搖籃凡世
- Hanyu Pinyin: Yáo Lán Fán Shì
- Jyutping: Jiu^{4} Laam^{4} Faan^{4} Sai^{3}
- Directed by: Chong Keat Aun
- Written by: Chong Keat Aun
- Produced by: Jment Lim; Wong Kew Soon; Candy Wong; Lung Kwok Yiu; Zoey Teng
- Starring: Fish Liew; Natalie Hsu; Ben Yuen; Pearlly Chua; Yuan Teng; Jasmine Suraya; Tan Mei Ling; Dishaaleny Jack; Mia Sabrina
- Cinematography: Leung Ming Kai
- Edited by: Emily Leung
- Music by: Yii Kah Hoe; Chong Keat Aun
- Production companies: SunStrong Entertainment: Janji Pictures; Offline Pictures; Southern Islet Pictures
- Distributed by: Parallax Films
- Release dates: 30 October 2024 (Tokyo); 19 June 2025 (Hong Kong); 14 August 2025 (Malaysia)
- Running time: 117 minutes
- Countries: Malaysia; Hong Kong
- Languages: Cantonese; Malay; English

Pavane for an Infant (Chinese: 搖籃凡世) is a 2024 drama film co-produced by Malaysia and Hong Kong, written and directed by Chong Keat Aun, and starring Fish Liew, Natalie Hsu, Ben Yuen and Pearlly Chua.

The film premiered at the 37th Tokyo International Film Festival as part of the Asian Future on 30 October 2024. It went on to receive the Youth Jury Award at the 39th Fribourg International Film Festival and was honored as the Opening Film of the 49th Hong Kong International Film Festival. The film was selected as the Malaysian entry for the Best International Feature Film at the 98th Academy Awards, but was not nominated.

== Premise ==
In multicultural Malaysia society, the existence of a baby hatch remains a whispered taboo, branded as an enabler of moral decay, punishable by God. Three committed employees of a Kuala Lumpur baby hatch facility navigate a maze of societal opposition to empower women from diverse backgrounds grappling with the complex notion of bodily autonomy.

== Cast ==
- Fish Liew as Lai Sum
- Natalie Hsu as Siew Man
- Ben Yuen as Keong
- Pearlly Chua as Kam
- Yuan Teng as Ming
- Jasmine Suraya as Nurul
- Tan Mei Ling as Fatimah
- Mia Sabrina Mahadir as Lead Plate Dancer

== Release ==
The film had its world premiere at the 37th Tokyo International Film Festival and was subsequently released theatrically in Hong Kong on 19 June 2025, Malaysia on 14 August 2025 and later in Taiwan on 19 September 2025.

=== Accolades ===
- 37th Tokyo International Film Festival - World Premiere | Asian Future Competition
- 39th Fribourg International Film Festival - Youth Jury Award
- 12th Silk Road International Film Festival - Golden Silk Road Award for Best Screenplay
- 49th Hong Kong International Film Festival - Opening film
- 44th Istanbul Film Festival - Official Selection
- 27th Shanghai International Film Festival - Asian Collection
- 24th New York Asian Film Festival - Official Selection
- 6th Hainan International Film Festival - Feature Film Competition
- Bremen Film Festival 2025 - German Premieres Competition
- Taipei Golden Horse Film Festival 2024 - Gala Premiere

== See also ==
- List of submissions to the 98th Academy Awards for Best International Feature Film
- List of Malaysian submissions for the Academy Award for Best International Feature Film
