= Liao Ming-yi =

Taiwanese filmmaker (born 1980)

- 廖明毅
- Born: Liao Ming-yi; 1980 (age 45–46); Taipei, Taiwan
- Education: Kun Shan University (BFA); National Taiwan University of Arts (MFA)
- Occupations: Director; screenwriter; cinematographer; editor
- Years active: 2011–present

Liao Ming-yi (Chinese: 廖明毅; born 1980) is a Taiwanese filmmaker best known for his directorial and cinematographic debut I WeirDo (2020), which is the first Asian feature film to be shot entirely on an iPhone and earned him nominations for Best New Director and Best Cinematography in the 57th Golden Horse Awards.

== Biography ==
Liao was born in 1980 in Taipei, Taiwan. He developed an early interest in western painting and pursued his studies at Fu-Hsin Trade & Arts School. He became interested in films after watching the Taiwanese drama film Rebels of the Neon God with his friends at the age of 12. He credited the works of Wong Kar-wai, David Fincher, and Steven Soderbergh as his major influence on film aesthetics. After graduating from high school, he attended Kun Shan University and obtained a Bachelor of Fine Arts in motion pictures and videos. He then attended the Graduate School of Applied Media Arts at the National Taiwan University of Arts and earned a Master of Fine Arts in applied media arts. During his graduate school years, Liao interned at advertising companies and was exposed to filmmaking. He began cinematographing music videos for acquaintances and served as the cinematographer for Mi-sen Wu's documentaries. In 2010, he produced a short film, 8624, which won Special Mention in the general slate of the 33rd Golden Harvest Awards.

Liao made his feature film debut in 2011 as the managing director and editor of the romance film You Are the Apple of My Eye. He continued to work as an editor in the 2013 romantic comedy film Forever Love, and made his screenwriting debut in the 2016 Chinese-Taiwanese romance film At Cafe 6, where he also served as the managing director and did uncredited editing work. In 2017, Liao took on the roles of managing director and screenwriter for the comedy film Didi's Dream.

In 2020, Liao served as the director, screenwriter, cinematographer, and editor for the romantic drama film I WeirDo. The film was entirely shot using an iPhone XS Max, making it the first Asian feature film to be cinematographed with an iPhone. Prior to the film, Liao had already shot a music video for Crowd Lu entirely on an iPhone, which gained substantial attention on the internet and millions of views, inspiring him to explore this approach further in feature filmmaking. To accommodate the unique cinematography, Liao prepared by drafting scripts, creating storyboards, and capturing concept photos on set before filming each shot. I WeirDo's innovative filming technique, plot, and subject matter garnered widespread acclaim. Liao won Best New Director in the 1st Directors Guild of Taiwan Awards, and was nominated for Best New Director and Best Cinematography in the 57th Golden Horse Awards with the film. The following year, Liao was invited to produce the advertising short film for the 2021 Taipei Film Festival, for which he shot entirely with an iPhone 12 Pro Max once again. Liao is set to direct the live-action adaptation of the Taiwanese manga Yan.

== Filmography ==
=== Film ===
Year	Title	Editor	Cinematographer	Director	Screenwriter	Notes/Ref.
2011	You Are the Apple of My Eye	Yes	No	Managing	No	
2013	Forever Love	Yes	No	No	No	
2016	At Cafe 6	Uncredited	No	Managing	Yes	
2017	Didi's Dream	No	No	Managing	Yes	
2020	I WeirDo	Yes	Yes	Yes	Yes	
TBA	Yan	TBA	TBA	Yes	TBA	

== Awards and nominations ==
Year	Award	Category	Work	Result	Ref.
2020	57th Golden Horse Awards	Best New Director	I WeirDo	Nominated	
2020	57th Golden Horse Awards	Best Cinematography	I WeirDo	Nominated	
2021	1st Directors Guild of Taiwan Awards	Best New Director	I WeirDo	Won	
