= Soap Opera (2004 film) =

2004 film

- Promotional image
- Directed by: Wuershan
- Written by: Wuershan
- Produced by: Yu Wang
- Starring: Le-yi Chen; Feng Deng; Hui Zhang
- Cinematography: Guo Daming; Liu Yonghong
- Edited by: Wuershan
- Music by: Yu Wang
- Release date: October 8, 2004 (South Korea)
- Running time: 90 minutes
- Country: China
- Language: Mandarin

Soap Opera is a 2004 Chinese drama film directed by Wuershan and starring Le-yi Chen, Feng Deng, and Hui Zhang. The film won the FIPRESCI Award at the Busan International Film Festival.

== Cast ==
- Le-yi Chen
- Feng Deng
- Hui Zhang

== Accolades ==
Year	Award	Category	Recipient(s) and nominee(s)	Result	Ref.
2004	Busan International Film Festival	FIPRESCI Award	Wuershan	Won	
