= Yalla Parkour =

2024 documentary film by Areeb Zuaiter

- Festival release poster
- Directed by: Areeb Zuaiter
- Written by: Areeb Zuaiter
- Produced by: Basel Mawlawi
- Starring: Areeb Zuaiter; Ahmed Matar
- Cinematography: Ibrahim Al-otla; Marco Padoan; Umit Gulsen
- Edited by: Phil Jandaly
- Music by: Diab Mekari
- Production companies: Kinana Films
- Release date: 16 November 2024 (Doc NYC)
- Running time: 87 minutes
- Countries: Sweden; Qatar; Saudi Arabia; Palestine
- Languages: Arabic; Swedish

Yalla Parkour is a 2024 documentary film written and directed by Areeb Zuaiter in her directorial debut feature. The film follows Areeb Zuaiter in pursuit of a memory that reinforces her sense of belonging, and she crosses paths with Ahmed, a parkour athlete in Gaza.

It was premiered at the Doc NYC on 16 November 2024, where it competed in the International Documentary Competition.

An International co-production from Sweden, Qatar, Saudi Arabia, Palestine, it was showcased as part of the Panorama at the 75th Berlin International Film Festival on 15 February 2025.

== Synopsis ==
Areeb Zuaiter returns to Gaza, a place she first visited as a child with her Palestinian mother. After her mother's death, her longing for her homeland is reignited by a video of young men practicing parkour amid explosions. Reconnecting with Ahmed, one of the athletes, Areeb navigates Gaza's ravaged landscape, exploring parkour sites and symbols of Palestinian spirit. Through Ahmed's perspective, she faces the harsh reality of Gaza as an open-air prison, contrasting it with her life in the United States and her mother's legacy.

== Cast ==
- Areeb Zuaiter, a filmmaker, looking for ways to connect with a home where she never lived.
- Ahmed Matar, a professional parkour athlete from Gaza.

== Production ==
In June 2021, the film received grant under Spring Grants–2021 from Doha Film Institute.

In October 2022, the Close-Up selected the film as one of the sixteen projects for its 2022-2023 edition, which is a tailor-made training and development programme that runs for a period of eight-months for documentary filmmakers.

== Release ==
Yalla Parkour had its world premiere at the Doc NYC on 16 November 2024 in International competition, where it won Grand Jury Prize.

It had its Middle East and North Africa Premiere at Red Sea International Film Festival on 10 December 2024.

It had its European premiere in the Panorama section of the 75th Berlin International Film Festival on 19 February 2025.

The film will compete in Documentary Competition at the 49th Hong Kong International Film Festival for Firebird Awards on 17 April 2025.

It also competed in New Directors Competition at the São Paulo International Film Festival and had screening on 17 October 2025.

== Reception ==
On the review aggregator website Rotten Tomatoes, 80% of 10 critics' reviews are positive, with an average rating of 7.5/10.

Alissa Simon, writing in Variety gave negative review and opined, "It is an approach that may connect with some viewers, although for this reviewer, it undermines the more dynamic and compelling struggles of the young Gazan."

== Accolades ==
Award	Date	Category	Recipient	Result	Ref.
Doc NYC	23 November 2024	Grand Jury Prize	Yalla Parkour	Won	
Berlin International Film Festival	23 February 2025	Panorama Audience Award for Best Documentary Film	Areeb Zuaiter	2	
Hong Kong International Film Festival	21 April 2025	Documentary Competition, Firebird Award	Yalla Parkour	Won	
Nordisk Panorama Film Festival	23 September 2025	City of Malmö’s Audience Award	Yalla Parkour	Won	
