= Forever Love (2013 film) =

- Theatrical release poster
- Traditional Chinese: 阿嬤的夢中情人
- Literal meaning: Grandma's Dream Guy
- Hanyu Pinyin: Āmā de Mèngzhōng Qíngrén
- Directed by: Kitamura Toyoharu; Aozaru Shiao
- Screenplay by: Lin Chen-hao
- Produced by: Hank Tseng
- Starring: Lan Cheng-lung; Amber An; Tien Hsin; Wang Po-chieh
- Cinematography: Patrick Chou
- Edited by: Liao Ming-yi
- Music by: Rockid Lee
- Production company: Greener Grass Production
- Release date: February 27, 2013
- Running time: 124 minutes
- Country: Taiwan
- Languages: Mandarin; Taiwanese Hokkien

Forever Love (Chinese: 阿嬤的夢中情人; originally titled Hollywood Taiwan) is a Taiwanese film directed by Kitamura Toyoharu and Aozaru Shiao. It commemorates the golden age of Taiwanese films. It stars Lan Cheng-lung, Amber An, Tien Hsin and Wang Po-chieh. The film was released in Taiwan on 27 February 2013. Its theme song, "Da Dian Ying", was nominated for Best Original Film Song Award at the 50th Golden Horse Awards.

== Plot ==
The 1960s was a golden age for Taiwanese films. Qi-sheng Liu (Shao-hua Long) tells his granddaughter Xiao-jie (Yi-jie Li) how he was "the most famous screenwriter at that time”. However, Xiao-jie does not believe that Taiwanese films used to be popular and doubts the story told by her grandfather. Xiao-jie's grandmother (Hai-rong Shen) has amnesia and confuses reality with dreams. She thought she was the wife of Bao-long Wan (Wang Po-Chieh), who was a Taiwanese film star at that time. Only when her grandfather tells Xiao-jie a love story from the old days does Xiao-jie finally understand the reason why her grandmother could not forget Bao-long Wan.

In 1969, the movie No.7 Spy (七號間諜; Qi Hao Jian Die) was released in Taiwan. Fans of Bao-long Wan lined up for the premiere hoping they could catch a glimpse of the famous star. The young Qi-sheng Liu (Blue Lan) was experiencing writer's block on his new screenplay and had just met a country girl Mei-yue Jiang (Amber An). By chance, Mei-yue came with the film crew and stood in as an extra on the set. Qi-sheng was attracted by her charm, but a movie star named Yue-feng Jin (Tien Hsin) wanted Qi-sheng for herself.

After the success of No.7 Spy, the film company decided to produce a sequel. The relationship between Qi-sheng and Mei-yue was blossoming, but the director died suddenly when they started to produce the new film. The director of the film company asked Qi-sheng to take over this work and continue to produce the film. Unfortunately, a series of problems occurred ultimately leading to cancellation of the production. The plot terminates with the revealing of whether or not the dream lover of Xiao-jie's grandmother was her grandfather or the Taiwanese star Bao-long Wan.

== Cast ==
=== Main ===
Cast	Role	Description
Lan Cheng-lung	Liu Qi Sheng (Young)	A famous scriptwriter in the 60s, he could easily have been working on seven screenplays at the same time. The themes of his works are wide in range, which can include sci-fi, fantasy, romance, action, suspense, spy. He has a quiet and stern nature and he aspires to become a director, but was betrayed by his boss Hsiao Chih Gao and thus had to serve a four-years sentence. He had mentioned that Jiang Mei Yue was the person who taught him the meaning of happiness.
Amber An	Jiang Mei Yue (Young)	A village girl who headed to Taipei for a chance to see her idol. Jiang Mei Yue snuck into the cinema in an attempt to catch a glimpse at superstar Wan Bao Long, where she met with Liu Qi Sheng who fell in love at first sight. She aspires to become an actress and enters an acting class where she then became a female lead for a movie, replacing the then-famous actress Jin Yue Feng. But when Qi Sheng, also director of the movie, went into prison, she was thrown into distraught.
Wang Po-chieh	Wan Bao Long	A movie superstar of the 60s. As a Taiwanese film actor, he actually does not understand Taiwanese and had to use dubbing for his lines in the movie. With his handsome appearance and killer smile, he was the idol of the times and also a guarantee to box office sales. His on-screen romance partner is the equally famous actress Jin Yue Feng.
Tien Hsin	Jin Yue Feng	A female superstar of the 60s. Her status in the industry was comparable to Maggie Cheung of the 90s. Different from Wan Bao long, her acting and professionalism was higher than that of Wan Bao Long's. Jin is irritated with Wan, and thinks that he is too narcissistic. She is in love with scriptwriter Liu Qi Sheng.

=== Supporting ===
Cast	Role	Description
Lung Shao-hua	Liu Qi Sheng (Elder)	The elder Liu is more enthusiastic when compared to his younger self, and loves to take on challenges. He was hospitalised after he met with an accident while riding the bike, where the topic of Taiwan Hollywood started when he chats with his visiting granddaughter. He faces the elder Jiang Mei Yue who has dementia and tries everything to remind his wife of their memories.
Shen Hairong	Jiang Mei Yue (Elder)	Aged nearly seventy, she has dementia and thinks that she is the famous actress Jin Yue Feng and is waiting for her hero, Wan Bao Long to save her.
Liao Jun	Hsiao Chih Gao	Hsiao Chih Gao is the boss of the movie company, and he is known to be lusty. He actually is an expert in the industry and has a good eye for good films in the market. As the Taiwanese film industry market worsen, he resorted to selling low level measures to meet with the new trends. In the end, he betrayed the naive Liu Qi Sheng and landed him in jail. Hsiao's story is the personification of the Taiwanese film industry, from its peak to the fall.
Peng Peng	Sister Peng	Although Hsiao Chih-Gao does not want to admit it, Sister Peng has known him from his childhood. The only stylist in the movie company, she deals with everything ranging from hairstyles to makeup. Peng is optimistic and her only goal in the movie industry was to keep a tight rein on Hsiao Chih Gao by catching him when he peeps on actresses.
Phil Yan	Bai Qi	Buddy of Liu Qi Sheng, whose job was to take care of matters of the filming crew. After Liu Qi Sheng was released from jail, he met Liu and told him that audience only watched either television or Mandarin films nowadays, hence reflecting on the situation of the Taiwanese film industry.
Lee Yi-Jie	Xiao Jie	Granddaughter of Liu Qi Sheng, she often accompanies the elder Liu to old cinemas to watch movies. Xiao Jie thinks that the stories that her grandfather had told her were faked by him. In the end, she was able to gain support from netizens in her efforts to allow the re-editing of her grandparents film, and fulfilling their dreams.
Kitamura Toyoharu	Hei Lun	An movie art director, who is in charge of making movies backdrops and props.
Chen Bing-nan	Li Jiu	A director at Chih-Gao's movie company. Although he has already directed many movies, but he still does not agrees with Hsiao Chih Gao's takes on doing things. He is fond of Liu Qi Sheng's abilities, and often motivates Liu to make a film that will be a smashing hit.
Alice Huang	Ai Mei	Mother of Xiao Jie. Often troubled by her mother's dementia problem.

=== Cameo ===
Cast	Role	Description
OneTwoFree	Host at the Cinema	The host at the Hollywood Cinema Movie Premiere
Riva Chang	Female Journalist	The TV journalist who interviewed at the Nostalgic Old Films Premiere.
Lin Chih-Ju	Boss of the Cinema	The boss of the Hollywood Cinema.
Kuo Yu Chi	Staff at the Movie Company	A staff at the movie company who is in charge of casting.
Danny Teng	Boss of the Western Restaurant	The boss of the western restaurant that Wan Bao Long and Jiang Mei Yue went to.
Ting-Ting Hu	Hu Li Li	A staff at the movie company who is in charge of casting.

== Background ==
"Hollywood Taiwan" refers to the Beitou District located in the northernmost district of Taipei City in Taiwan. The many film studios found in Beitou led to the district's colloquial name of Hollywood Taiwan (Chinese：臺彎好萊塢；Pinyin：Taiwan Hao Lai Wu). However, because most films were made in black and white and the market was limited, the Taiwanese film industry gradually declined. Between 1955 and 1981, around a thousand Taiwanese films were produced.

== Awards and nominations ==
Awards	Category	Recipient	Result
50th Golden Horse Awards	Best Original Film Song	"Da Dian Ying" Lyricist: Zhang Jian-wei; Composer: Zhang Jian-wei, Liao Wei Jie; Performer: OneTwoFree	Nominated
2013 Taipei Film Awards	Best Screenplay	Lin Zhen-hao	Won
