= Wuershan =

Chinese film director

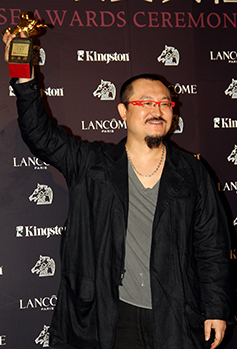
- Wuershan at the 2011 Golden Horse Awards
- Born: June 10, 1972 (age 54); Hohhot, Inner Mongolia, China

Chinese name
- Traditional Chinese: 烏爾善
- Simplified Chinese: 乌尔善
Transcriptions
Standard Mandarin
- Hanyu Pinyin: Wūěrshàn

Wuershan (乌尔善) is a Chinese film director of Mongol descent. His first feature film was Soap Opera (2004), for which he was awarded the FIPRESCI Award at the Pusan International Film Festival. He went on to direct blockbusters The Butcher, the Chef and the Swordsman (2010), Painted Skin: The Resurrection (2012), and Mojin: The Lost Legend (2015), for which he was awarded the Hundred Flowers Award for Best Director at the 33rd Hundred Flowers Awards. In 2019, he began production of the Creation of the Gods trilogy. The trilogy was a massive success in China and internationally. As of June 2026, Creation of the Gods I is 31st of the highest-grossing films ever in China.

== Early life ==
Wuershan was born in Hohhot, Inner Mongolia, China, on 10 June 1972. At the age of sixteen, he enrolled to a high school affiliated to China's Central Academy of Fine Arts, and in 1992, he was admitted to the oil painting department of the latter. He dropped out the following year. In 1994, he began studying film directing at the Beijing Film Academy. After graduating in 1998, he worked as a TV commercials director, video artist, and avant-garde artist.

== Career ==
Wuershan's film debut came with Soap Opera (2004). This movie achieved success in the Chinese film circuit, winning the FIPRESCI Award at the 2004 Pusan International Film Festival.

Wuershan's second feature film, The Butcher, the Chef and the Swordsman, debuted at the Toronto International Film Festival (TIFF). The film premiered in TIFF's Midnight Madness section, the first time a film from China has been shown at this sidebar. It received mixed reviews from critics. The film was also screened at the Pusan Film Festival. It was presented by Doug Liman at the festival. It was released theatrically on 17 March 2011 in Southeast Asia, North America, Australia and New Zealand simultaneously. Described as an avant-garde martial arts comedy, the film is split into three stories titled "Desire", "Vengeance" and "Greed," and it follows the "journey of a mystical blade as it passes through the hands of three ambitious men."

Wuershan's third feature film, Painted Skin: The Resurrection, was released on 28 June 2012. The film has an 83% approval rating on aggregate site Rotten Tomatoes, and is described as a "deliciously nutty love story". In the film, Xiaowei is a malevolent fox spirit who consumes men's hearts to preserve her beauty. She is searching for a freely-given heart in order to become human, while lovesick Princess Jing (who wears a mask to conceal her scarred face) searches for true love. With a total box office gross of $115.07 million, the film became the highest grossing domestic film in China, beating the previous record holder Let the Bullets Fly.

His fourth feature film was Mojin: The Lost Legend, an action adventure fantasy thriller film based on the novel Ghost Blows Out the Light. It was released on December 18, 2015. The film won several awards, including Best Visual Effects at the Beijing College Student Film Festival and the Golden Horse Awards, and Wuershan was named Best Director at the 33rd Hundred Flowers Awards. The movie however received mixed reviews from western critics. The film was a huge box-office success, grossing over US$278 million on a budget of US$37 million.

In 2019, he began on the production on the Creation of the Gods trilogy. Sometimes dubbed as "China's Lord of the Rings", it is the "most ambitious and expensive production in Chinese history." The production has a crew of over two thousands employees. The movie is a retelling of Investiture of the Gods, a 16th-century Chinese novel and one of the major vernacular Chinese works in the gods-and-demons (shenmo) genre written during the Ming dynasty (1368–1644).

The novel combines elements of history, folklore, mythology, legends and fantasy, with a story set in the era of the decline of the Shang dynasty (1600–1046 BC) and the rise of the Zhou dynasty (1046–256 BC). It tells about the downfall of King Zhou, the Shang Dynasty's last ruler. He becomes a tyrant after having been "bewitched by a fox spirit posing as his concubine." An epic battle "rages to defeat him, involving gods, demons and other supernatural beings." Barrie M. Osborne, producer of The Lord of the Rings: The Return of the King, was involved in the production.

The first film of the trilogy, Creation of the Gods I: Kingdom of Storms, was released in 2023, and a sequel, Creation of the Gods II: Demon Force, was released in 2025.

== Filmography ==
=== Director ===
- Soap Opera (肥皂剧), 2004
- The Butcher, the Chef and the Swordsman (刀见笑), 2010
- Painted Skin: The Resurrection (画皮II), 2012
- Mojin: The Lost Legend (寻龙诀), 2015
- Creation of the Gods I: Kingdom of Storms (封神第一部：朝歌风云), 2023
- The Traveller, 2024
- Creation of the Gods II: Demon Force (封神第二部：战火西岐), 2025
- Creation of the Gods III: Creation Under Heaven, TBA

=== Producer ===
- Creation of the Gods I: Kingdom of Storms, 2023
- The Traveller, 2024

== Awards and nominations ==
| Year | Award | Category | Project | Result | Ref. |
|---|---|---|---|---|---|
| 2016 | Hundred Flowers Awards | Best Director | Mojin: The Lost Legend | Won | |
| 2011 | Golden Horse Awards | Best New Director | The Butcher, the Chef and the Swordsman | Won | |
| 2004 | Pusan International Film Festival | FIPRESCI Award | Soap Opera | Won | |
