= I WeirDo =

- Film poster
- Traditional Chinese: 怪胎
- Simplified Chinese: 怪胎
- Hanyu Pinyin: Guài tāi
- Directed by: Liao Ming-yi
- Written by: Liao Ming-yi
- Produced by: Ivy Chen
- Starring: Austin Lin; Nikki Hsieh
- Cinematography: Liao Ming-yi
- Edited by: Liao Ming-yi
- Music by: Hebe Tien
- Production company: Activator Marketing Company
- Distributed by: Sony Pictures Releasing International
- Release dates: 29 June 2020 (Far East Film Festival); 7 August 2020
- Running time: 104 minutes
- Country: Taiwan
- Language: Mandarin
- Box office: NT$45,129,701

I WeirDO (Chinese: 怪胎) is a 2020 Taiwanese romantic drama film written and directed by Liao Ming-yi (in his feature directorial debut), and stars Austin Lin and Nikki Hsieh. The film had its world premiere at the 22nd Far East Film Festival on June 29, 2020, where it won the Purple Mulberry Award. It was officially released in Taiwan on August 7, 2020. It is the first Asian feature to be filmed entirely on an iPhone, a 32-day shoot on the iPhone XS Max.

== Synopsis ==
Po-Ching is a freelance translator with severe OCD and serious symptoms of mysophobia. He spends most of his waking hours cleaning up his apartment, covers up fully when going out, frequently washes his hands wherever he goes and limits his grocery shopping to the 15th of each month. As a result, his habits have isolated him from the general public and people see him as a complete weirdo.

On one such shopping trip, he meets another weirdo Chen Ching, who shares similar habits and tics. As they spend time together, Po-Ching learns that Chen Ching works as a nude model for drawing classes, but her allergies mean she frequently experiences hive attacks during prolonged sessions. Po-Ching proposes that Chen Ching move in with him so they can support each other, and they quickly bond over their shared habits and experience difficulties, becoming boyfriend and girlfriend. Together, they swear that nothing will change between them.

The following day, Po-Ching suddenly discovers that he is no longer mysophobic, being able to touch grime on a window without breaking out in allergies. A distraught Chen Ching consults various doctors to see if Po-Ching's OCD can be restored before he assures her that his newfound state will change nothing. Despite this, Chen Ching realizes that Po-Ching will eventually yearn for a normal life not bound by the limits of his previous lifestyle; sure enough, Po-Ching accepts a job at a publishing company, becomes distant from Chen Ching as his career progresses, and eventually dumps Chen Ching to move in with his colleague Mei-Yu. Chen Ching returns to her previous apartment as an emotional wreck. At the same time, Po-Ching discovers that he has started obsessively rewashing his hands, as if from stress triggered by his betrayal.

The movie abruptly cuts back to Chen Ching lying awake in bed next to Po-Ching, revealing that the events of Po-Ching's recovery have been a dream. Spotting a stray lizard, Chen Ching gets out of bed and inadvertently grabs a dirty broom to chase it away, realizing that her mysophobia has been cured overnight. Recounting the events of her dream, Chen Ching imagines a sequence of events where her and Po-Ching's roles are reversed: she goes ahead to lead a normal life, takes on an office job, and eventually leaves Po-Ching to pursue a relationship with her co-worker, leaving Po-Ching distraught and alone in his house.

In the present, Po-Ching wakes up to find Chen Ching clutching the dirty broom. She looks back at him, visibly shaking and tearful, knowing that their relationship has irreparably changed and terrified of the future to come, concluding the movie on a cliffhanger.

== Cast ==
- Austin Lin as Chen Po Ching
- Nikki Hsieh as Chen Ching
- Chang Shao-huai as Psychiatrist
- Aviis Zhong as Mei-Yu
- Chung Cheng-chun as Chen Ching's Colleague
- Zhong Yuechun as Dermatology Clinic Physician

== Awards and nominations ==
| Award | Category | Recipients | Result | Notes |
|---|---|---|---|---|
| 22nd Far East Film Festival | Purple Mulberry Award | "I WeirDo" | Won | |
| 22nd Far East Film Festival | Audience Award | "I WeirDo" | Nominated | |
| 19th New York Asian Film Festival | Special Mention | "I WeirDo" | Won | |
| 19th New York Asian Film Festival | Best Film | "I WeirDo" | Nominated | |
| 57th Golden Horse Awards | Best New Director | Liao Ming-yi | Nominated | |
| 57th Golden Horse Awards | Best Leading Actor | Austin Lin | Nominated | |
| 57th Golden Horse Awards | Best Leading Actress | Nikki Hsieh | Nominated | |
| 57th Golden Horse Awards | Best Cinematography | Liao Ming-yi | Nominated | |
| 57th Golden Horse Awards | Best Visual Effects | Sam Kung, Miao Tien-yu, ArChin Yen | Nominated | |
| 57th Golden Horse Awards | Best Art Direction | Jhong-Syuan Wu | Nominated | |

== Plagiarism accusation ==
The film has been accused of plagiarizing elements from the 2017 film Million Loves In Me, particularly in its portrayal of characters with obsessive–compulsive disorder, including scenes involving a couple wearing raincoats. As I WeirDo was scheduled for release in Hong Kong, the copyright holder of Million Loves In Me, JK Holdings Limited, filed a lawsuit in the Hong Kong High Court against the film's two Taiwanese production companies and its director-screenwriter Liao Ming-yi. The plaintiff alleges copyright infringement and misleading association, seeking to block the film's commercial exploitation in Hong Kong and claim damages.

In response, distributor Golden Scene, the production companies, and director Liao Ming-yi denied the allegations, asserting that the two films differ fundamentally in subject matter and narrative, and that I WeirDo is an original work unrelated to Million Loves In Me. They confirmed that legal counsel has been engaged to contest the lawsuit and noted that the court has not issued any injunction preventing the film's screening or promotion in Hong Kong.

Director Liao Ming-yi further stated that he was unaware of Million Loves In Me prior to receiving the accusation and had never seen the film. He emphasized that I WeirDo was independently conceived and created, and the accusation have caused reputational and commercial harm. Liao further reaffirmed his commitment to originality.

== See also ==
List of films shot on mobile phones
