= The Story of Southern Islet =

- Film poster
- 南巫
- Directed by: Chong Keat Aun
- Written by: Chong Keat Aun
- Produced by: Lim Hui Bee
- Starring: Jojo Goh; Pearlly Chua; Season Chee
- Cinematography: Chan Hai Liang
- Edited by: Tan Wei Jian; Kong Jing Rong
- Music by: Yii Kah Hoe
- Production company: Asteri Production
- Release date: November 10, 2020 (Golden Horse Film Festival)
- Running time: 105 minutes
- Country: Malaysia
- Languages: Cantonese; Hokkien; Malay; Mandarin

The Story of Southern Islet (Chinese: 南巫) is a 2020 Malaysian film directed by Chong Keat Aun. The film is his first feature. The plot was inspired by the director's own childhood in Kedah, Northern Malaysia. The film, that addresses the topic of shamanism, received various awards and positive critical response.

== Premise ==
Yan's husband, Cheong, catches a mysterious disease. Yan seeks the help of various shamans in the hope that they can improve his condition, that conventional doctors seem unable to cure .

== Themes ==
A review explained that "What is comparatively more menacing are the political spectres. Set in 1987, the film features news reports of the Malaysian government’s policies of the time, made all the more eerie with today’s hindsight. For Malaysian Chinese, the year might spark resentment of the government’s closure of Chinese media outlets, how Chinese schools were sent non-Chinese-educated teachers for senior positions, and Operation Lalang."

== Release ==
The film was theatrically released in November 2020.

The Story of Southern Islet was selected for the 2021 Locarno International Film Festival, the International Rotterdam FIlm Festival, the Golden Horse FIlm Festival, where it won the Award for the Best Director, and the Valladolid Film Festival.

== Awards and nominations ==
Year	Award	Category	Result	Ref.
2020	Golden Horse Film Festival	NETPAC Award	Won	
2020	Golden Horse Film Festival	Observation Missions for Asian Cinema Award	Won	
2020	Golden Horse Film Festival	FIPRESCI Prize	Won	
2020	57th Golden Horse Awards	Best New Director	Won	
2020	57th Golden Horse Awards	Best Original Screenplay	Nominated	
2021	45th Hong Kong International Film Festival	FIPRESCI Prize	Won	
2021	25th Fantasia International Film Festival	AQCC - Camera Lucida Prize	Won	

== Reception ==
A review in Screen Daily found that "The Story Of Southern Islet is a little unfathomable at times but that only adds to its sense of mystery. Chong seems to place more emphasis on storytelling and showcasing issues around Malaysian identity than developing well rounded characters." A reviewer for Asian Movie Pulse described the genre of the film by evoking the wider Malaysian context: "Although the movie could easily have become a horror, Chong Keat Aun's steady directorial hand does not allow the narrative to fall that way, with the supernatural elements serving another purpose, that of presenting the mixture of cultures, mentalities and ways of thinking that dominate the area. In that regard, and in combination with the realism permeating the market scenes and the overall everyday life, the movie essentially functions as a tour guide to all the antithetical aspects that comprise life in Malaysia, including the co-existence of the natural and the supernatural."

== See also ==
- Malaysian folk religion
- Na Tuk Kong
- The Medium
