= The Butcher, the Chef and the Swordsman =

2010 Chinese-Hong Kong-American film by Wuershan

- Toronto International Film Festival poster for the film
- Directed by: Wuershan (乌尔善)
- Screenplay by: Zhang Jiajia; Tang Que; Ma Luoshan; Wuershan; Tang Xiru
- Story by: An Changhe
- Produced by: Daniel Yu; Tang Xiru (唐郗汝)
- Starring: Kitty Zhang; Masanobu Andō; You Benchang; Liu Xiaoye; Ashton Xu
- Cinematography: Michal Tywoniuk
- Edited by: Huang Zhe
- Music by: Gong Geer; Dead J. Miquia
- Production company: First Cuts Pictures
- Distributed by: 20th Century Fox
- Release dates: September 16, 2010 (TIFF); March 17, 2011
- Running time: 92 minutes
- Countries: China; Hong Kong; United States
- Language: Mandarin

The Butcher, the Chef and the Swordsman (simplified Chinese: 刀见笑; traditional Chinese: 刀見笑; pinyin: Dāo Jiàn Xiào) is a 2010 Mandarin-language action comedy film directed by Wuershan. The film is made up of three inter-twining stories. The first about a butcher who takes revenge on a swordsman for humiliation, the second is about a chef who has his apprentice makes an eight-course meal for the powerful Eunuch Liu. The final story is about a warrior with a powerful sword melted from other champion swords, but the sword does not work as expected during combat.

The film was a feature debut of director Wuershan. It premiered at the Toronto International Film Festival where it received a mixed critical reception.

== Plot ==
The film is split into three stories titled "Desire", "Vengeance" and "Greed".

"Desire" is set in a remote area in Ancient China where a butcher named Chopper (Liu Xiaoye) is in love with Madam Mei (Kitty Zhang) and tries to buy her, but is beaten to her by the swordsman Big Beard (Senggerenqin) who gets her first. Humiliated, he tries to commit suicide but is saved by a beggar using a cleaver of incredible quality. Ignoring the beggar's warning that the cleaver is a kitchen knife not meant for homicide, Chopper steals the blade and seeks vengeance on Big Beard.

In "Vengeance", which is the beggar's story of the cleaver, a master chef (Mi Dan) is instructed to prepare his renowned eight-course specialties for the powerful Court Eunuch Liu (Xie Ning) who will be in the area in a month's time. The eunuch is a food connoisseur who is known to execute cooks who fail to satisfy his palate. To safeguard his recipes, the master chef chooses his mute apprentice (Masanobu Andō) to be his successor and imparts the secrets of his specialties. As the chef revealed that the key to the final dish was in using the special cleaver to scale and gut a fish, he is unaware he is falling into a trap of his new protege who has different plans for the cleaver. After the chef samples the poisoned dishes by the protege and realises the plot, he reveals the origins of the cleaver.

In "Greed", which is the master chef's story, the Swordsman Dugu Cheng (Ashton Xu) brings a lump of black iron that was cast by Fatty Tang (You Benchang) by melting down weapons from defeated champion warriors. A generation before, Dugu Cheng's late father was the victor who routed numerous ambitious pugilists in an attempt to restore peace to the realms and had taken the black iron with him to the grave. Dugu Cheng wants to become the new champion and manages to force Fatty Tang into forging the black iron into a sabre, just in time to face a host of other of ambitious pugilists who caught up with him. During combat, Dugu Cheng realises that not everything is as it seems.

== Production ==
The Butcher, the Chef and the Swordsman is the first feature film from Tang XiRu's (唐郗汝) Beijing-based production company First Cut Pictures and the debut feature of director WuErShan (乌尔善) that emerged from the prestigious First Cuts Pictures STAR Screenwriting Workshop and FirstCuts Film Project. It was also Fox International's second Chinese production after Hot Summer Days (2010).

== Release ==
The Butcher, the Chef and the Swordsman premiered on September 16, 2010, at the Toronto International Film Festival in the Midnight Madness section marking the first time a film from China has been shown at this sidebar. It was also screened at the Pusan Film Festival. The film was presented by Doug Liman at the festival. It was released theatrically on 17 March 2011 in Southeast Asia, North America, Australia and New Zealand simultaneously.

=== Reception ===
After the premiere in Toronto, reception was generally mixed. Variety wrote that "even fanboys will be hard-pressed to engage with this quasi-martial-arts epic or even follow its ornate, overlapping plotlines. Of course, midnight screenings and some cultish enthusiasm are always possible." Eye Weekly gave the film two stars out of five, noting that "The Butcher, the Chef and the Swordsman is really only memorable for its twitchy incoherence. Essentially a story within a story within a story, TBTCTS veers from terrible (the over-the-top Butcher vs whorehouse scenes, minus the surreal hip-hop sequence) to actually pretty decent (the second narrative frame involving what amounts to a revenge story, Iron Chef-style)" Film Business Asia gave the film a positive rating of seven out of ten praising the script and the cast.

== Cast ==
- Kitty Zhang
- Masanobu Andō
- You Benchang
- Liu Xiaoye
- Ashton Xu
- Han Pengyi
- Liu Hua
- Ning Hao
