= Chong Keat Aun =

Malaysian director

- 張吉安
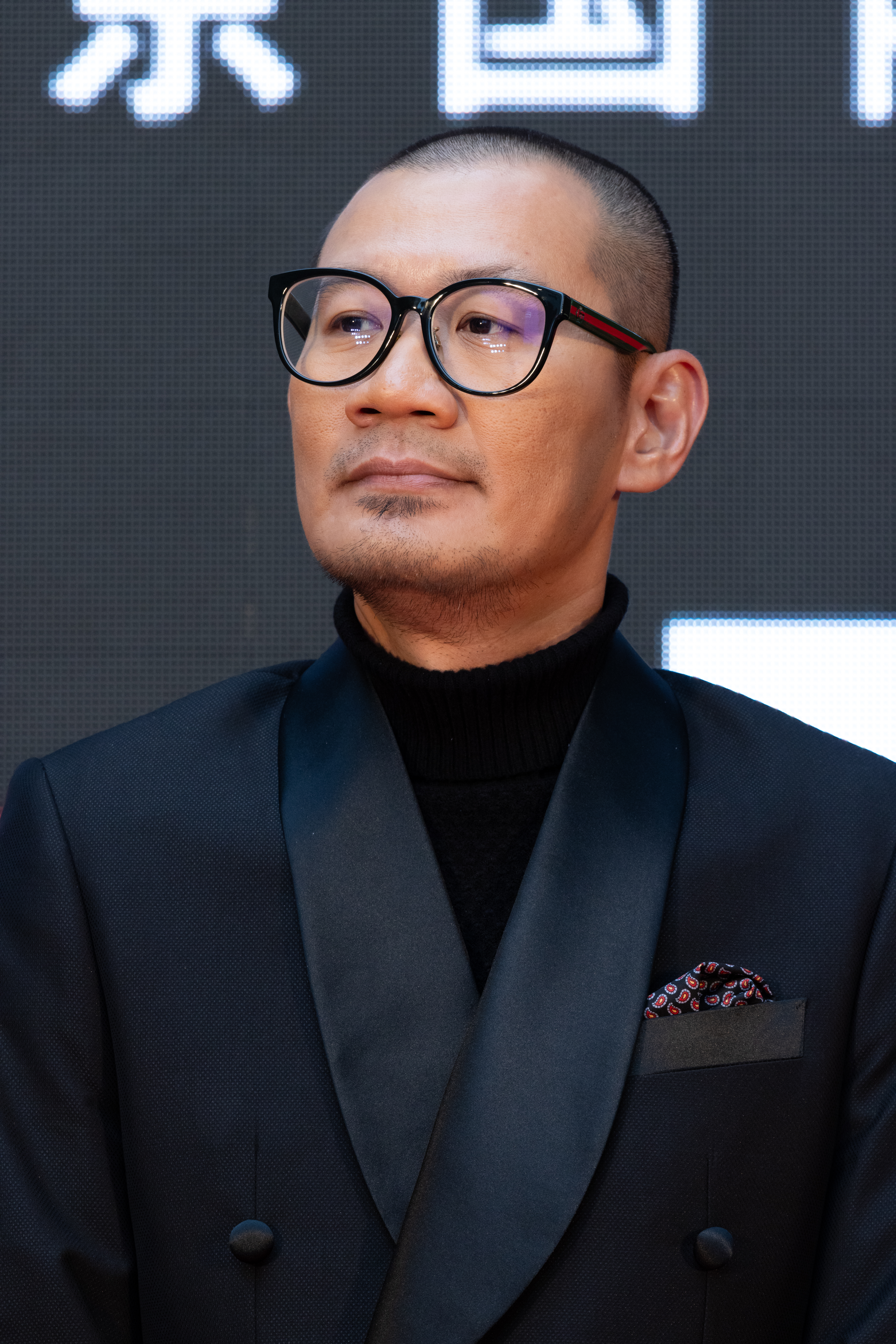
- Chong Keat Aun at the 37th Tokyo International Film Festival in 2024
- Born: February 14, 1978 (age 48); Kedah, Malaysia
- Education: Keat Hwa Secondary School; Tunku Abdul Rahman University of Management & Technology; Limkokwing University of Creative Technology; Curtin University
- Occupations: Film director; screenwriter
- Awards: 57th Golden Horse Awards

Chong Keat Aun, (Chinese: 張吉安; pinyin: Zhāng Jí'ān; born 14 February 1978) is a Malaysian film director and writer.

== Biography ==
Chong Keat Aun was born in Kedah in 1978.

== Career ==
His directorial debut The Story of Southern Islet won the Best New Director, FIPRESCI and NETPAC awards at the 57th Golden Horse Awards.

His second feature film, Snow in Midsummer, was selected for Giornate degli Autori at the 80th Venice International Film Festival. The film premiered in September 2023 and received critical acclaim. The film won the Uncaged Award for best feature film at the New York Asian Film Festival in July 2024.

== Filmography ==
=== Feature films ===
Year	English title	Original title	Notes/Ref.
2020	The Story of Southern Islet	南巫	
2023	Snow in Midsummer	五月雪	
2024	Pavane for an Infant	搖籃凡世	
2025	Mother Bhumi	地母	
TBA	Amah's Miseries	金蘭荖葉	In production

=== Short films ===
- 2017: Cemetery of Courtesy (義山)
- 2021: The Incident (疫外)
- 2022: Dayang Bersiong - The Sinful Cook (狼牙的御女)

== Awards and nominations ==
Year	Award	Category	Nominated work	Result	Ref.
2017	22nd Busan International Film Festival	Wide Angle	Cemetery of Courtesy	Nominated	
2020	57th Golden Horse Awards	NETPAC Award	The Story of Southern Islet	Won	
2020	57th Golden Horse Awards	Observation Missions for Asian Cinema Award	The Story of Southern Islet	Won	
2020	57th Golden Horse Awards	FIPRESCI Prize	The Story of Southern Islet	Won	
2020	57th Golden Horse Awards	Best New Director	The Story of Southern Islet	Won	
2020	57th Golden Horse Awards	Best Original Screenplay	The Story of Southern Islet	Nominated	
2021	45th Hong Kong International Film Festival	FIPRESCI Prize	The Story of Southern Islet	Won	
2021	25th Fantasia International Film Festival	AQCC-Camera Lucida Prize	The Story of Southern Islet	Won	
2023	80th Venice International Film Festival	Giornate degli Autori Award	Snow in Midsummer	Nominated	
2023	80th Venice International Film Festival	Musa Cinema & Arts Award – Special Mention	Snow in Midsummer	Won	
2023	60th Golden Horse Awards	Best Director	Snow in Midsummer	Nominated	
2023	60th Golden Horse Awards	Best Adapted Screenplay	Snow in Midsummer	Nominated	
2023	60th Golden Horse Awards	Best Original Film Score	Snow in Midsummer	Nominated	
2023	60th Golden Horse Awards	Best Original Film Song	Snow in Midsummer	Nominated	
2023	47th São Paulo International Film Festival	New Directors Competition	Snow in Midsummer	Nominated	
2024	48th Hong Kong International Film Festival	Firebird Award for Best Film – Young Cinema Competition (Chinese Language)	Snow in Midsummer	Won	
2025	62nd Golden Horse Awards	Best Director	Mother Bhumi	Nominated	
2025	62nd Golden Horse Awards	Best Original Film Score	Mother Bhumi	Nominated	
2025	62nd Golden Horse Awards	Best Original Film Song	Mother Bhumi	Won	
