= Areeb Zuaiter =

Palestinian director

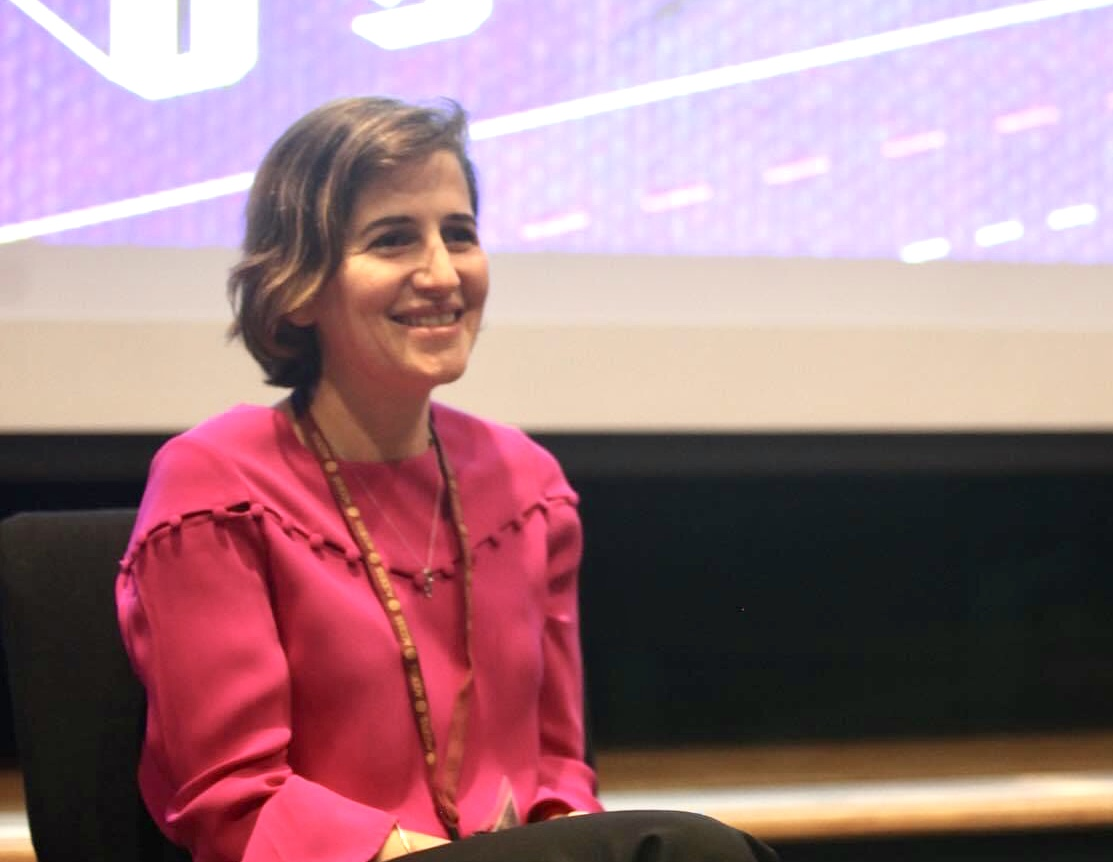
Areeb Zuaiter at the Arab American National Museum

Areeb Zuaiter (born 17 June 1980) is a Palestinian director.

== Training ==
Zuaiter was born in Nablus, Palestine. Her family moved to Saudi Arabia when she was two months old. She initially took up painting before becoming interested in filmmaking.

In 1997 she moved to Lebanon to pursue her BA in Interior Architecture, then another BA in Radio, TV and Film from the Lebanese American University. She moved to the United States in 2010 to pursue her master's degree in film and video production from American University.

== Career ==
Zuaiter led the Regional Training Department at the Royal Film Commission - Jordan and served as the head of film programming at the Amman International Film Festival - Awal Film (AIFF).

Zuaiter spent a year at the Smithsonian's National Museum of American History as a Goldman Sachs Film and Video Fellow where she produced some of the Museum's projects. Between 2016 and 2018, Zuaiter served on the evaluation committees for the Rawi Screenwriters Lab, the Film Prize of the Robert Bosch Stiftung and Med Film Factory.

Zuaiter taught Visual Literacy, Media Production II and History of Documentary at American University's School of Communication and taught Film Production II at Howard University's Cathy Hughes School of Communications.

Zuaiter is also the founder of the production house A0 Productions.

== Film work ==
Zuaiter directed the short fiction film "Stained," which won the Jury Prize at the European Film Festival in Lebanon. She also directed the documentary Colors of Resistance, which won the London Independent Film Awards Best Documentary Short at the London Independent Film Festival in 2019.

In 2024, Zuaiter made her feature directorial debut with the documentary Yalla Parkour, which follows parkour athletes in Gaza and explores her own Palestinian roots. It won the Grand Jury Prize at the 2024 DOC NYC Film Festival, and was nominated for the Panorama Audience Award at the 2025 Berlin International Film Festival. The film is qualified for the 98th Academy Awards.

Zuaiter creates works focused on social issues, art, Palestine and identity. She has said that she is "presenting, preserving and protecting people who can no longer find their city on a map."

== Education ==
Areeb studied at the Lebanese American University where she earned a Bachelor of Architecture in Interior Architecture and a Bachelor of Art in Communication Arts. She also studied at American University and earned a Master's Degree in Film and Video Production from the American University School of Communication.

== Documentaries ==
- Colors of Resistance
- Yalla Parkour

== Awards ==
Yalla Parkour

- DOC NYC Grand Jury Prize 2024 (winner)
- Berlin International Film Festival 2025 Panorama Audience Award (nominee)
- Hong Kong International Film Festival 2025 Golden Firebird Award (winner)

- Around International Film Festival

2019	Winner ARFF Globe Award	March 2019 - Paris Colors of Resistance (2019)

- London Independent Film Awards

2019	Winner Best Short Documentary	March 2019 Colors of Resistance (2019) (short, documentary film)
