= Brave Animated Series season 1 =

Brave Animated Series
- Season 1
- Showrunner: Yang Tzi Ting
- Starring: Tseng Yun Fan; Gao Yun Shuo; Jiang Qing Yan; Jiang Du Hui; Meng Qing Fu; Huang Bai Wei; Ma Guo Yao; Chen Yan Jun; Sun Ke Fang; Niu Kai Yang; Xu Shu Bin; Teng Wei-Te; Chen You Wen; Liao Guo Jun; Wu Kang Ren; Mu Xuan Ming; Lin Kai ling; Huang Tzu jiao; Liu Kuan-ting; Fu Pin Cheng; Sun Cheng
- No. of episodes: 6

Release
- Original network: PTS
- Original release: July 4 – July 18, 2021

The first season of the Taiwanese satire fantasy animated television series Brave Animated Series is based on the comic book series of the same name written by Yellow Book, was developed for television by Yang Tzi Ting and Wang Wei Xiu. The season was produced by Public Television Service in association with Big Cat Studio and Aries Creative.

The story is set in RPG-like world, where three races: Humans, Demons And Dragons coexist, but are in constant conflict, The series follow the Braves, who are considered heroes for the brave kingdom, but in reality they are warmongering soldiers that kill all demons just to get XP. The series follows multiple characters, like Morewant, Main Brave and Dragon Girl, who tries to stop the braves while they questionate what is the true side of justice.

The season was released in the official PTS channel on July 4, 2021. It received positive reviews by the critics,who praised its story, animation and comedy, and it won the Best Animated Series Award on the 57th Golden Bell Awards.

== Episodes ==
No. overall	No. in season	Title	Directed by	Written by	Original release date	Prod. code
1	1	"This Isn't Right"	Yang Zi Ting	Yang Zi Ting	4 July 2021	1-01
The Braves must kill the demon king Morewant to achieve peace, but unexpected news about the human king leads them to question their loyalties.
2	2	"The way the world sees us…"	Yang Zi Ting	Yang Zi Ting	4 July 2021	1-02
Many years later, the Braves live on taxpayer money and do easy kills to level up. Vowing to stop them, a goblin and a slime find help along the way.
3	3	"What other choices do I have?"	Yang Zi Ting	Yang Zi Ting	11 July 2021	1-03
The Braves and the dragons are at war. Two dragon parents attempt to rescue their daughter, who has been taken hostage.
4	4	"Even though you're useless!"	Yang Zi Ting	Yang Zi Ting	11 July 2021	1-04
Goblin and Slime convince the young Brave terrorizing their village to join them as they set out to find a powerful weapon.
5	5	"We're the same…"	Yang Zi Ting	Yang Zi Ting	18 July 2021	1-05
Dragon Girl discovers the truth about the conflict between the Braves and the dragons.
6	6	"Look what he's like now!"	Yang Zi Ting	Yang Zi Ting	18 July 2021	1-06
Morewant encounters an old friend and settles unfinished business from 20 years ago.

== Cast ==
=== Main ===
- Tseng Yun Fan as Main Brave / Sick Demon.
- Sun Ke Fang as Dragon Girl.
- Fu Ping Cheng as Morewant.
- Huang Bai Wei as Fair Brave.
- Kao Yun Chuo as Goblin.
- Wu Kang Ren as Chief Brave.

=== Recurring ===
- Teng Wei Te as Water Demon.
- Chen Yan Jun as Fire Demon.
- Mu Xuan Ming as Desire Queen.
- Jiang Du Hui as Bunny.
- Niu Kai Yang as Dragon Slayer Brave.
- Xu Shu Bin as Blue Dragon.
- Liao Guo Jun as Loyal Brave.
- Chen You Wen as Black Brave.
- Jiang Qing Yan as Sword Brave / Slime.
- Meng Qing Fu as Superstar Brave.
- Lin Kai ling as Despair Brave.
- Sun Cheng as Business King / Red Dragon.
- Xu Huang Huang as War King.
- Ma Guo Yao as Old King / Flying Sword.

=== Guest ===
- Huang Tzu jiao as Old Morewant.
- Liu Kuan ting as First Brave.

== Production ==
The series began production in 2018, When the Ministry of Culture of Taiwan started funding for new animated series in the region based on original IP's, an indie animation studio called "Big Cat Studio" proposed to make an animated series bases on "Brave Series", a web comic book series created by Yellow Book, with a budget of NT$40 million, where NT$1 million were used in the behind the scenes.

=== Writing ===
While the series is based in the first 260 pages of the comic book, the director Yang Tzu Ting decided to make a new original story based on the three first chapters of the series, having a writing period of about half a year and including an original characters like Loyalty Brave

=== Casting ===
The series is conformed by an assemble cast, Tseng Yun Fan, Fu Ping Cheng, Kao Yun Chuo, Jiang Du Hui, Teng Wei Te, Chen Yan Jun, and Mu Xuan Ming were cast in secret and voiced the characters on from 2019 to 2020, Du Hui was the responsible of voicing "Bunny", but after her death in September 2019 due to uterine cancer, she was replaced by Yun Fan in episode 4, additionally, recognizable actors like Sun Ke Fang, Liu Kuan ting, Huang Tzu jiao and Wu Kang Ren were cast to voice some characters in the series.

=== Music ===
The music was composed by Wei-Fan Chang, who also worked on games like Detention, House Flipper and Asterigos: Curse of the Stars, Chang used some videogames sounds as reference for the soundtrack, especifically from 90's videogames and a sound design of a Gameboy Advance. Also, Mayday's singer and songwriter Ashin composed the main theme "The Demon King and the Brave." alongside with the band LION additionally bands like Eggplant Egg, Amazing Show, Won Fu, Gugu Lu Siwei and Wei Jia-Ying served in the score of the season.

=== Accolades ===
Award	Date of ceremony	Category	Nominated	Results	Ref.
57th Golden Bell Awards	October 22, 2022	Best Animated Show	"Brave Animated Series"	Won	
57th Golden Bell Awards	October 22, 2022	Best Sound Design (General Program)	Gao Wei Yan, Wei Fan Chang, Lin Xie Zhong	Nominated	
