= Golden Horse Award for Best Animated Feature =

Taiwanese film award

- Awarded for: Best Animated Feature
- Location: Taiwan
- Presented by: Taipei Golden Horse Film Festival Executive Committee
- First award: 1977
- Currently held by: Yee Chih-yen for City of Lost Things (2020)
- Website: www.goldenhorse.org.tw

The Golden Horse Award for Best Animated Feature (Chinese: 金馬獎最佳動畫長片) is an award presented annually at the Golden Horse Awards by the Taipei Golden Horse Film Festival Executive Committee, though for some editions, both nominees and winner were absent. Yee Chih-yen is the latest winner, winning for City of Lost Things at the 57th Golden Horse Awards in 2020.
