= Chloe Xiang =

Taiwanese actress (born 1999)

- 項婕如
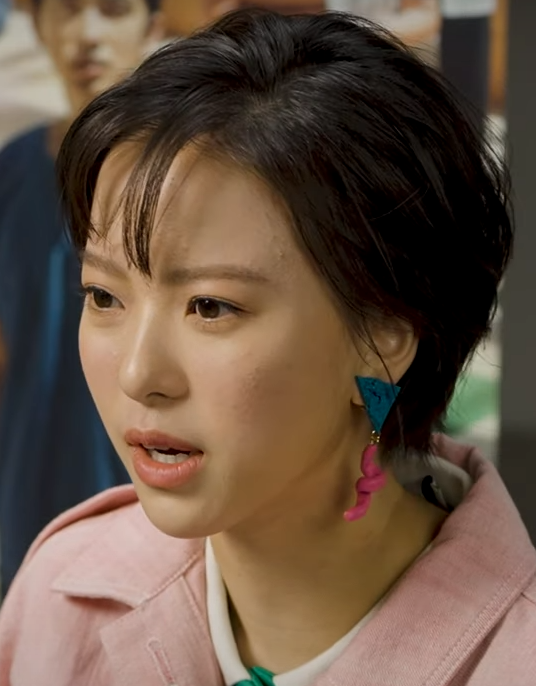
- Xiang in April 2023
- Born: 1999 (age 26–27); Taiwan
- Other name: University of Kang Ning (BEd)
- Occupation: Actress
- Years active: 2018–present

Chloe Xiang Jie-ru (Chinese: 項婕如; born 1999) is a Taiwanese actress. Beginning her career with the SET television series Let's Go Crazy on Live! (2019–2020), Xiang is best known for her leading roles in the crime thriller The Abandoned (2022) and the medical drama Eye of the Storm (2023). In 2024, Xiang received a nomination for Best Actress in the 26th Taipei Film Awards for her role in the romance film Suffocating Love.

== Early life and education ==
Xiang was born in 1999. She attended a vocational high school, where she studied early childcare. She described herself as "shy" during her childhood and did not have a particular interest in acting until she coincidentally joined an audition, which inspired her to pursue a career as an actress. At the age of 16, she auditioned for Giddens Ko's 2017 horror comedy film Mon Mon Mon Monsters, but did not secure a role. She continued her studies at the University of Kang Ning, majoring in early childhood care and education, and graduated with a Bachelor of Education in 2019. During university years, she became determined to pursue acting and took on multiple part-time jobs to save money for future auditions.

== Career ==
Xiang made her acting debut in a lead role as Hsu Hsin-meng, a high school student, in the 2018 romance film How to Train Our Dragon, winning the role from a pool of 200 auditioners. The following year, she landed a main role as Lin An-an, alongside Ben Wu, in the SET television series Let's Go Crazy on Live!. During the early days of the COVID-19 pandemic, Xiang faced several months without acting roles and worked as a babysitter to make a living. In 2021, she starred in main roles in the romance series The Love's Outlet and the drama series The Summer Temple Fair.

In 2022, Xiang played Wilson, a rookie cop, alongside Janine Chang and Ethan Juan in the crime thriller film The Abandoned. She also gained recognition for her breakout role as Da Shi Yao Ji in the Netflix drama series Mom, Don't Do That!. She was named Top Talent by Taipei Film Festival in the same year. The following year, she starred as Dr. Li Xinyan, an empathic surgical intern during the SARS outbreak, in the medical drama film Eye of the Storm. She also took on another main role as Chuang Ying-wen in the SET television series Lovely Villain that same year.

In 2024, Xiang starred in Liao Ming-yi's experimental romance film Suffocating Love, which was entirely filmed with an iPhone. This performance earned her a nomination for Best Actress in the 26th Taipei Film Awards. She also appeared in the drama film The Uniform, alongside Buffy Chen, which premiered at the Busan International Film Festival that year.

== Personal life ==
In 2020, Xiang published a poetry anthology titled A Room with No Name, which sold approximately 8,000 copies within a month of its release.

== Filmography ==
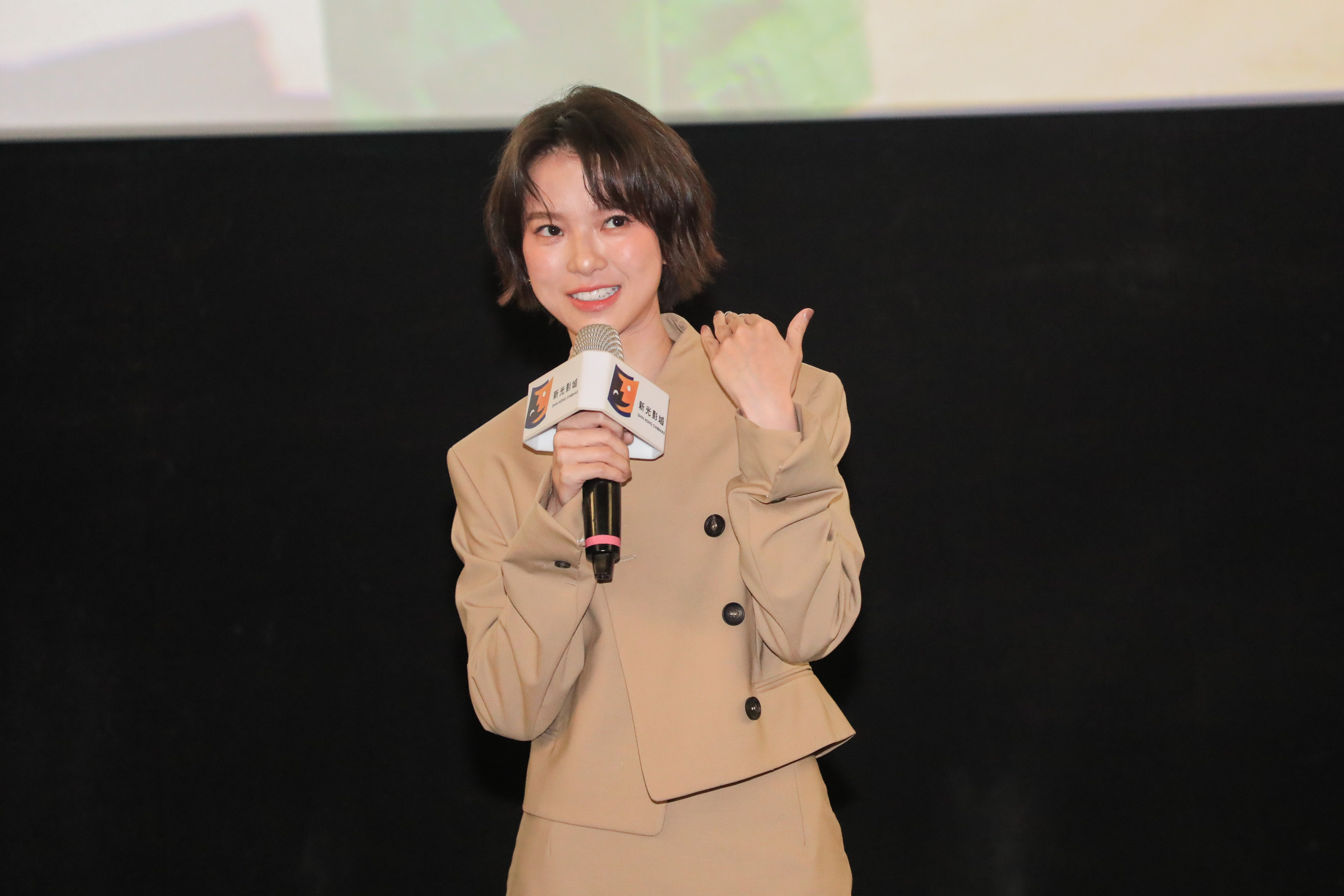
Xiang at the Taichung premiere of Eye of the Storm (2023)

=== Film ===
Year	Title	Role	Notes/Ref.
2018	How to Train Our Dragon	Hsu Hsin-meng (徐心夢)	
2022	The Abandoned	Wilson (蔡瑋姍)	
2023	Eye of the Storm	Li Xin-yan (李心妍)	
2024	Suffocating Love	Bai Jia-qi (白佳琪)	
2024	The Uniform	Min (羅家敏)	

=== Television ===
Year	Title	Role	Notes/Ref.
2019	Let's Go Crazy on Live!	Lin An-an (林安安)	Main role
2020	Workers	Yu (小玉)	Recurring role
2021	The Love's Outlet	Fu Jing-xue (傅靖雪)	Main role
2021	The Summer Temple Fair	Chen Nuan-nuan (陳暖暖)	Main role
2021	The Memory Garden	Tang Wan-ping (唐晚蘋)	Special appearance
2022	Mom, Don't Do That!	Da Shi Yao Ji (大食腰姬)	Recurring role
2022	Women in Taipei	Yi-shan (小怡珊)	Cameo
2023	Lovely Villain	Chuang Ying-wen (莊映文)	Main role
2024	Urban Horror	Yu (小瑜)	Main role
TBA	Million-follower Detective	TBA	Recurring role

== Awards and nominations ==
Year	Award	Category	Work	Result	Ref.
2024	26th Taipei Film Awards	Best Actress	Suffocating Love	Nominated	
