= Agent from Above =

Taiwanese fantasy television series

- Promotional poster
- Also known as: Agent from Above

Chinese name
- Traditional Chinese: 乩身
Transcriptions
Standard Mandarin
- Hanyu Pinyin: jī shēn
- Genre: Fantasy
- Based on: The Oracle Comes by Teensy
- Written by: Emma Chen
- Directed by: Donnie Lai
- Starring: Kai Ko; Wang Po-chieh; Hsueh Shih-ling; Buffy Chen; Johnny Yang; Kuo Tzu-chien; Sonia Sui
- Country of origin: Taiwan
- Original language: Mandarin

Production
- Producer: Rita Chuang
- Production companies: mm2 Entertainment; CaiChang International; Good Films Workshop
- Budget: NT$180,000,000

Original release
- Network: Netflix
- Release: 2 April 2026

Agent from Above (Chinese: 乩身) is a Taiwanese fantasy television series for Netflix based on Teensy's novel series The Oracle Comes. The show is directed by Donnie Lai and stars Kai Ko, Wang Po-chieh, Hsueh Shih-ling, Buffy Chen, and Johnny Yang in lead roles.

Agent from Above premiered on 2 April 2026 and consists of eight episodes.

== Cast ==
=== Main ===
- Kai Ko as Han Chieh, a criminal-turned-vessel of Third Crown Prince
- Wang Po-chieh as Third Crown Prince, a god who dwells in the modern world
- Hsueh Shih-ling as Wu Tien-chi, an heir to fortune who attempts to overthrow the mortal realm
- Buffy Chen as Yeh Chih-ling/Yeh Tzu, a university student suffering from blood cancer
- Johnny Yang as Chang Min, a police officer who has an ability to see ghosts
- Chen Yi-wen as Chen Chi-sha

=== Recurring ===
- Kuo Tzu-chien as Dragon Prince, a con man posing as a daoshi.
- Sonia Sui as Chiang Hua-chih
- Chris Pan
- Phil Hou
- David Chao as Old Chao
- Kurt Hsiao as Ah-fu
- Da-her Lin as Wang Hsiao-ming
- Leon Dai as Demon King of the Sixth Heaven

== Production ==
=== Development ===
On 10 December 2019, Singapore's mm2 Entertainment and Taiwan's CaiChang International and Good Films Workshop announced the series. It was based on Teensy's novel series The Oracle Comes. The series would be directed by Donnie Lai, produced by Rita Chuang and choreographed by Jimmy Hung, with Kai Ko, Wang Po-chieh, Sonia Sui, Kuo Tzu-chien and Pipi Yao starring in lead roles. The series would consist of six episodes and the production cost of the first season was expected to exceed NT$180 million, making it the most expensive drama to be produced out of Taiwan. A pilot episode was planned to film in 2020, before the distributors were announced, and scheduled to be released in 2021. Production was ultimately postponed due to COVID-19. In November 2022, Hsueh Shih-ling, Buffy Chen and Johnny Yang were added to the cast.

=== Filming ===
Principal photography began on 14 November 2022, in Keelung, Taiwan. On 27 December 2022, a drone failed and crashed in front of Kai Ko while filming a close-up. The drone's blade sliced Ko's cheekbone and resulted in severe facial injuries. Ko was hospitalized and required 30 stitches. Production was suspended after the accident and resumed on 11 January 2023. Filming was wrapped on 5 March.

== Release ==
The series was initially scheduled to premiere in 2023. It was released on Netflix on 2 April 2026.

== Episodes ==
No.	Title	Original release date
1	"Sinner"	April 2, 2026
2	"Reincarnation"	April 2, 2026
3	"Soul Harvest"	April 2, 2026
4	"Ghost Forge"	April 2, 2026
5	"Demonic Possession"	April 2, 2026
6	"Lucky"	April 2, 2026
7	"Descent"	April 2, 2026
8	"Transformation"	April 2, 2026
