= Futmalls =

- Futmalls.com promotional poster
- Also known as: Futmalls.com
- Genre: Science fiction; Suspense; Inference
- Directed by: Donnie Chun-Yu Lai
- Starring: Bryan Chang; Eugenie Liu; Bruce Hung; Ivy Shao
- Music by: Alexander Wong; Ivan Linn; Ian Chen; Chamber Chu
- Country of origin: Taiwan
- Original language: Mandarin
- No. of episodes: 8

Production
- Running time: 36-47 minutes

Original release
- Network: Youku; myVideo; Netflix
- Release: 3 December – 24 December 2020

Futmalls (Chinese: 預支未來) also known as Futmalls.com is a 2020 Taiwanese science fiction series by director Lai Chun-yu. Filming was completed on August 30, 2019, and it premiered on Youku on December 3, 2020. The show is co-produced by mm2 Entertainment.

== Synopsis ==
"Futmalls.com" (original title: "Future Malls", or Advance the Future in its Chinese name) is a 2020 science fiction drama series. It is directed by Lai Chun-yu.

The series is about three different stories that are connected to the website futmalls.com. Investigation into a series of strange cases leads police officer Zhao Xu-zhen to a mysterious website called "Futmalls.com," which claims to be from the future. There, customers can buy anything from the future from the site, including future love, fame and beauty. Futmalls is a mysterious shopping site, with an unlinkable URL where users are presumably randomly selected.

== Cast ==
=== Main ===
- Bryan Shu-hao Chang as Zhao Xu-zhen
- Eugenie Liu as Yang Nian-jun
- Bruce Hung as Li Zhong-wei
- Shao Yu-wei as Bai Yong-xin

=== Recurring ===
- Allison Lin as Bai Yong-li
- River Huang as Liu Xiang-da
- Wu Chien-ho as Zhan Guo-xiang / Fu Chen-guang
- Phoebe Huang as Jiang Mei-zhen
- Chu Chung-heng as Chen Guan-ting
- Hu Wei-jie as Guo You-yi
- Lin Tzu-xi as An Zheng-mei
- Ban Tieh-hsiang as Uncle Fu
- Ting Chun-cheng as Zhuang Yun
- Wang Ko-yuan as Chen Kai-xiang

=== Special guest ===
- Heaven Hai as chief editor
- Deng An-ning as commander
- Liu Shi-min as Mr. Yang, Nian-jun's father
- Lai Pei-hsia as Mrs. Yang, Nian-jun's mother
- Yang Da-jing as ceremony host

== Episodes ==
=== Season 1 (2020) ===
No.	Title	Original release date
1	"Best-Selling Writer (1)"	December 3, 2020
2	"Best-Selling Writer (2)"	December 3, 2020
3	"Best-Selling Writer (3)"	December 10, 2020
4	"No Chance to Grow Up (1)"	December 10, 2020
5	"No Chance to Grow Up (2)"	December 17, 2020
6	"Air Doll & Internet Celebrity Kidnappings (1)"	December 17, 2020
7	"Air Doll & Internet Celebrity Kidnappings (2)"	December 24, 2020
8	"Air Doll & Internet Celebrity Kidnappings (3)"	December 24, 2020
