= About Love (2005 film) =

- Film poster
- Directed by: Ten Shimoyama; Yee Chih-yen; Zhang Yibai
- Written by: Haruko Nagatsu; Shen Wei; Yee Chih-yen; Takuji Ushiyama
- Produced by: Takuji Ushiyama
- Starring: Bolin Chen; Misaki Ito; Yui Ichikawa; Mavis Fan
- Cinematography: Tao Yang; Kōichi Nakayama; Hsiang Chienn
- Edited by: Shogo Hirasawa
- Music by: Hironori Doi; Wei Ding; Hou Chih-Chien
- Production companies: Movie-Eye Entertainment; Tianjin Film Studio; Toho
- Distributed by: Group Power Workshop Inc. (Taiwan); Movie-Eye Entertainment (Japan); Celestial Pictures (Hong Kong)
- Release date: April 12, 2005
- Running time: 102 minutes
- Countries: Taiwan; China; Japan
- Languages: Japanese; Mandarin

About Love (Chinese: 關於愛; pinyin: Guan Yu Ai) is a 2005 anthology film. The film was directed by Ten Shimoyama, Yee Chih-yen, and Zhang Yibai. It was written by Haruko Nagatsu, Shen Wei, Yee Chih-yen and Takuji Ushiyama.

Three stories are told, respectively set in Tokyo, Taipei, and Shanghai. The first two stories are about a Japanese person and a Taiwanese person. The last one is set in Shanghai with a story about a Japanese man and a Chinese woman. Some of the characters speak Japanese and some of them Mandarin. Each story encompasses an experience of a foreigner, either from Japan, Taiwan or China, with a native of a different country.

== Plot ==
In Tokyo, a Chinese computer graphic artist seeks to enrich his exposure while a Japanese painter is struggling to recover from her broken relationship. This is the simplest and sweetest of the three stories, starting with hidden mutual attraction and ending in their first meeting. This is also the only one of the three stories with a "sub-plot" of his friendship with two other art students, both girls, one Chinese and one Japanese.

In Taipei, she is a local girl suffering from a broken heart and he is a Japanese visitor she asks in the middle of the night to help with putting up a wall unit. This is the only story with a scene of brief libido drive which, however, quickly subsides. The rest of the story is on his helping her by asking her ex-boyfriend whether there is a chance of getting back together. Among the three, this is the story that plays most on the language barrier, with some absolutely hilarious scenes resulting.

In Shanghai, he is a Japanese student renting a room from her mother. She has a crush on him at first sight but keeps it deeply hidden when she sees how devoted he is to his girlfriend. But when he gets a postcard from the girlfriend ending their relationship, her attraction to him intensifies, although she never reveals it. This is the most poignant of the three stories. Romance aside, this story also takes a quick jab at the maddening scene of urban development in Shanghai.

== Cast ==
Tokyo

- Bolin Chen
- Misaki Ito
- Yui Ichikawa

Taipei

- Mavis Fan
- Ryō Kase

Shanghai

- Li Xiaolu
- Takashi Tsukamoto

== Awards ==
- Outstanding Co-Production Film, China Huabiao Film Awards
