= Little Big Women =

2020 Taiwanese family drama film

- Traditional Chinese: 孤味
- Hanyu Pinyin: Gūwèi
- Hokkien POJ: Ko̍-bī
- Directed by: Joseph Hsu
- Written by: Maya Huang; Joseph Hsu
- Based on: Guo Mie (short film) by Joseph Hsu
- Produced by: Ching-Song Liao; Vivian Hsu
- Starring: Chen Shu-fang; Hsieh Ying-xuan; Vivian Hsu; Sun Ke-fang; Ding Ning; Buffy Chen
- Cinematography: Jon Keng
- Music by: Blaire Ko
- Production company: Each Other Films
- Distributed by: Vie Vision Pictures (Taiwan; theatrical); Distribution Workshop (International); Netflix (Worldwide; OTT)
- Release date: November 6, 2020
- Running time: 123 minutes
- Country: Taiwan
- Languages: Taiwanese Hokkien; Mandarin
- Budget: NT$40 million
- Box office: NT$190 million

Little Big Women (Chinese: 孤味) is a 2020 Taiwanese drama film directed by Joseph Hsu and produced by Vivian Hsu, adapting from an eponymous 2017 short film. Hsu also stars in a lead role, alongside Chen Shu-fang, Hsieh Ying-xuan, Sun Ke-fang, Ding Ning, and Buffy Chen. The film premiered in October 2020 at the Busan International Film Festival. The film became a box office hit in Taiwan.

== Plot ==
Lin Xiu-ying (Chen Shu-fang) is a well-known restaurant owner in Tainan. Without the support of her husband, she has single handedly raised three daughters by selling shrimp rolls at a roadside stall. Since then, her daughters have grown up with remarkable achievements. Her eldest daughter A-Qing (Hsieh Ying-xuan) is an international dancer, the second daughter A-Yu (Vivian Hsu) works as a plastic surgeon in Taipei and has a daughter whom she plans to send to study abroad (Buffy Chen), and the youngest daughter Jia-jia (Sun Ke-fang) oversees the restaurant business. On the day of her 70th birthday, Xiu-ying receives news of her husband's passing. While preparing for his funeral, she unexpectedly meets Ms Tsai (Ding Ning) who accompanied her husband through his old age, grappling with a long-buried resentment held over the years.

== Cast ==
- Chen Shu-fang as Lin Sho-ying (林秀英)
  - Sara Yu as young Sho-ying
- Hsieh Ying-xuan as Chen Wan-ching (陳宛青)
- Vivian Hsu as Chen Wan-yu (陳宛瑜)
- Sun Ke-fang as Chen "Jia-jia" Wan-jia (陳宛佳)
- Ding Ning as Tsai Mei-lin (蔡美林)
- Buffy Chen as Clementine Yang Yi-ching (楊奕澄)

Also appearing in the film are Lung Shao-hua as Chen Bo-chiang (陳伯昌), Lin Sho-ying's husband and the father of the Chen siblings; Weber Yang as a younger version of Bo-chiang; and Chang Han as Yang Cheng-hsien (楊政賢), a fellow surgeon and the husband of Chen Wan-yu. Ning Chang cameos as He Ching-mei (何晴眉), the supposed third sister of the Chen siblings who was sent away and raised separately. Chang agreed to make a cameo appearance at the invitation of Vivian Hsu without even reading the script and flew to Taiwan from China to participate in the shoot for one day.

== Awards and nominations ==
Year	Awards ceremony	Category	Nominee	Result	Ref
2020	57th Golden Horse Awards	Best Adapted Screenplay	Maya Huang, Joseph Hsu	Nominated	
2020	57th Golden Horse Awards	Best New Director	Joseph Hsu	Nominated	
2020	57th Golden Horse Awards	Best Leading Actress	Chen Shu-fang	Won	
2020	57th Golden Horse Awards	Best Supporting Actress	Hsieh Ying-xuan	Nominated	
2020	57th Golden Horse Awards	Best Original Film Score	Blaire Ko	Nominated	
2020	57th Golden Horse Awards	Best Original Film Song	Little Big Women	Nominated	
2021	15th Asian Film Awards	Best Actress	Chen Shu-fang	Nominated	
2021	15th Asian Film Awards	Best Supporting Actress	Hsieh Ying-xuan	Nominated	
