= Belle Chuo =

Taiwanese actress & model (born 1986)

- 卓毓彤
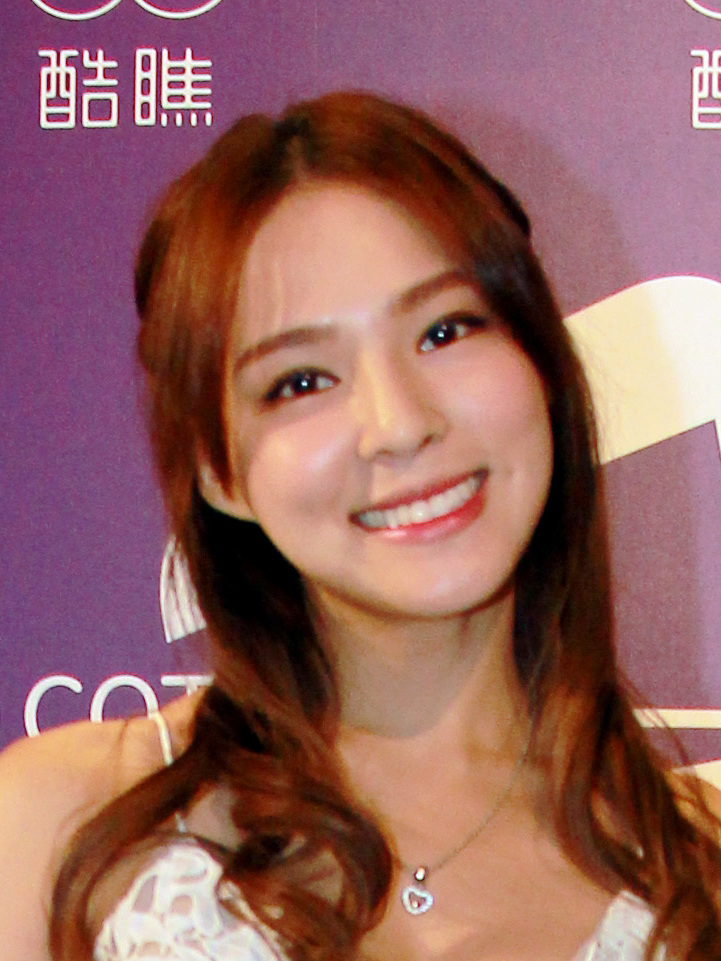
- Born: Wang Yü-fei; 4 September 1986 (age 40); Taipei, Taiwan
- Other names: Zhuo Yutong; Cho Yü-t'ung; Xiong Xiong; Belle Cho
- Occupations: Actress, model
- Years active: 2012–present
- Spouse: Mars (m. 2023)
- Children: 1

Chinese name
- Chinese: 卓毓彤
Transcriptions
Standard Mandarin
- Hanyu Pinyin: Zhuó Yùtóng
- Wade–Giles: Cho Yü-t'ung

Belle Chuo (Chinese: 卓毓彤; pinyin: Zhuó Yùtóng; Wade–Giles: Cho Yü-t'ung; born 4 September 1986), also known as Xiong Xiong (Chinese: 熊熊) is a Taiwanese actress and model.

== Life ==
She was born under the name Wang Yü-fei (Chinese: 王毓菲; pinyin: Wáng Yùfēi) but later took her mother's surname. Following her debut, she received media attention and appeared on the popular search terms list on the Taiwanese Internet portal site Yahoo! Kimo.

In 2010, she cooperated with Mickey Huang in his Little Sexy art photography debut. In 2013, she won FHM Taiwan's "100 Best Sexy Beauty" and ETtoday's "Beautiful Breast Goddess Award". In 2018, she hosted the Internet program Starlight Cloud! RUN Newspaper with Lin Po-sheng (KID), and the Internet program Please, Convenience Store with Huang Xiaoyi and Fred.

She made her debut in 2012 on a Taiwan Beauty Communication photo DVD taken in Japan and participated in exclusive interviews with the Toyo Newspaper ASCII, Friday Digital Magazine. In 2014, she made a special appearance in the film My Geeky Nerdy Buddies and starred in The Good Detectives of PMAM, the third season of the CTi television drama PMAM Series. She also played a supporting role in the CTV television drama CSIC 2 / i Hero 2.

In July 2023, she married her boyfriend named Mars, who is 5 years older. She gave birth to her first baby girl on 11 February 2024.

== Filmography ==
=== Television ===
Year	English title	Original title	Role	Network	Notes
2014	The Good Detectives of PMAM	PMAM之美好偵探社	Wei Wei	CTi	
2019	CSIC 2 / i Hero 2	鑑識英雄II 正義之戰	Milk tea	CTV	
2019	Let's Go Crazy on LIVE!	網紅的瘋狂世界	Ye Luo Sha	TTV; SET Metro	
2020	Lost Romance	浪漫輸給你	Dong Fangmeng	TTV; SET Metro	

=== Film ===
Year	English title	Original title	Role	Notes
2014	My Geeky Nerdy Buddies	大宅們	Beauty on the road	Cameo
2017	Punched by Love	兵荒馬亂的愛情	Ma Manli	Web film
