= Brave Animated Series =

2021 Taiwanese animated series

- Promotional poster
- Genre: Action; Adult animation Adventure; Comedy drama Fantasy
- Based on: Brave Series
- Developed by: Yang Zi Ting; Wang Wei Xiu
- Written by: Yang Zi Ting
- Directed by: Yang Zi Ting
- Voices of: Tseng Yun Fan; Gao Yun Shuo; Jiang Qing Yan; Jiang Du Hui; Meng Qing Fu; Huang Bai Wei; Ma Guo Yao; Chen Yan Jun; Sun Ke Fang; Niu Kai Yang; Xu Shu Bin; Teng Wei-Te; Chen You Wen; Liao Guo Jun; Wu Kang Ren; Mu Xuan Ming; Lin Kai ling; Huang Tzu jiao; Liu Kuan-ting; Fu Pin Cheng; Sun Cheng
- Theme music composer: Ashin
- Composer: WeiFan Chang
- Country of origin: Taiwan
- Original language: Chinese
- No. of seasons: 1
- No. of episodes: 6

Production
- Executive producers: Yu Pei Hua; Lin Chiung Fen
- Producer: Wang Wei Xiu
- Running time: 25 minutes
- Production companies: Big Cat Studio; Aries Creative; Public Television Service

Original release
- Network: Public Television Service
- Release: 4 July 2021 – present

Brave Animated Series (Chinese: 勇者動畫系列 Pinyin: Yǒngzhě dònghuà xìliè lit. 'Brave Animation Series') is a Taiwanese comedy fantasy animated series based on the comic book series of the same name, created by Yellow Book. It is produced by Big Cat Studio in association with Aries Creative and Public Television Service. The series is set in a RPG fantasy video game-like World, where a group of heroes who want to stop the evil forces of the Demon Kingdom, only for them to realize that they are not in the right side of justice.

The series premiered on July 4, 2021, on the Public Television Service, being delayed from its original June 13 premiere date due to the COVID-19 pandemic. Additionally, it was released on Taiwanese streaming services MyVideo and Line TV. The show previously streamed internationally on Netflix. (Note: Only in 190 countries around the world.) (Note: Despite being released in Netflix worldwide,the series did not receive any international dubbing.) However, in 2024, due to the contract between them and the show's producers ending, it was taken off the platform. Full episodes have since been uploaded officially on YouTube. The second season was released on August 23, 2025, on the same platform.

Brave Animated Series received positive reviews by critics, who praised its story, animation and comedy, and the first season won the Best Animated Series Award on the 57th Golden Bell Awards.

== Plot ==
In a World of Fantasy, exist three races, Humans, Demons, and Dragons, which are in constant conflict, for humans exist a group of warriors called "Braves", who try to eliminate the grand demon king "Morewant", and send peace to the kingdom, a Newbie Brave tries to defeat the demons but when he discover than they are not evil beings, and the Braves are actually bloodthirsty warmongers who want to eradicate demon race for XP, decide to unite with the demon kingdom to stop them.

The series is a satire of the tropes of RPG games and fantasy media, where it criticize the roles of heroes and villains and human nature.

== Voice cast ==
From left to right: War King, Business King, Red Dragon, Reporter, Desire Queen, Dragon Slayer Brave, Blue Dragon, Sick Demon, Dragon Brave, Chief Brave, Fire Demon, Water Demon, Morewant, Main Brave, Goblin, Bunny, Slime, Loyalty Brave, Despair Brave, Sword Brave, Superstar Brave, Black Brave, First Brave, Old King, Old Morewant and Yellow Book (As seen on the first season).

- Tseng Yun Fan as Main Brave: a Newbie who joins the Braves to take down the demons and restore peace, only to learn that he is not what people think he is.
  - Yun Fan also voices Sick Demon: a little maniatic creature which is one of the four general demon kings.
- Sun Ke Fang as Dragon Brave: an Human-Dragon Hybrid who is forced to join braves for protect her parents.
- Fu Pin Cheng as Morewant: a brave and the eventual king of demons who needs to pay constantly the rent of the Morewant Tower.
  - Huang Bai Wei also voice Fair Brave: the young brave version of Morewant and one of the guards of the old king before becoming the king of demons.
  - Ping Cheng also voices Lava Cheese:a humanoid lava demon, member of the Fire Demon's Trio and one of Fallen Mad Demon's henchmen.
- Teng Wei Te as Water Demon: an anthropomorfic fish woman with hydrokinesis who is Morewant's second in hand and one of the four general demon kings.
- Chen Yan Jun as Fire Demon: an anthropomorfic fire cat with pyrokinesis who was formerly one of the four general demon kings before retiring after some divisive reactions of his peaceful beliefs.
  - Yan Jun also voices Golem Demon Elder: The insecure leader of the Golem Demons
- Kao Yun Shou as Goblin: a little goblin who wants to destroy all braves with his partners Slime and Bunny.
  - Yun Shou also voices Golem demon Little Girl: A young Golem Demon child who embodies the species desire to be seen as cute.
- Jiang Qing Yan as Slime: a little slime which is Goblin and Bunny partner.
  - Quin Yan also voices Sword Brave: a swordswoman catgirl brave who fights using a katana.
- Jiang Du Hui as Bunny: an anthropomorfic warrior bunny "elf" who becomes Goblin and Slime's master and later her partner. (Note: This was one of Du Hui last performances before she died in September 16, 2019 by Uterine cancer. Being voiced later by Tseng Yun Fan in Episode 4.)
- Meng Qing Fu as Superstar Brave: an narcissist brave who fights using a rapier which also doubles as a Microphone. His design seems to be inspired in the American singer Elvis Presley.
  - Quing Fu also voices Fire Phoenix: a antropomorphic chicken, Leader of the Fire Demon's Trio and one of Fallen Mad Demon's henchmen.
- Niu Kai Yang as Dragon Slayer Brave: a former brave who protect dragons and is Dragon Brave's father.
- Xu Shu Bin as Blue Dragon: a dragon who fell in love with Dragon Slayer Brave and is Dragon Brave's mother.
  - Shu Bin also voice a news reporter of the brave kingdom .
- Chen You Wen as Black Brave: an old and fierce brave who was one of the guards of the old king, After losing to Fair Brave, he stabbed himself with his own sword and recorded what happened live while recognizing the young Fair Brave as "The New Morewant."
- Liao Guo Jun as Loyal Brave: a brave who is very loyal with his king and who was Fair Brave's old friend. This is the first original characters of the series.
- Wu Kang Ren as Chief Brave: Black brave's son and the current leader of the braves who follows the king's commands, also is the one in charge of receiving the monthly payment of the rent of the Morewant tower.
  - Lego Lee voice Chief Brave in the second season.
- Mu Xuan Ming as Desire Queen: a succubus in a cheerleader outfit who is one of the four general demon kings and Chief Brave's Partner.
- Lin Kai ling as Despair Brave: a female general brave and Business King's advisor.
- Huang Tzu jiao as Old Morewant: a peasant demon and the previous king of demons before Fair Brave who sacrificed himself to give him his powers. (Note: Due to Huang's accusations of sexual harassment, the character was voiced later by Fu Pin Cheng on the re-release of Season 1 in the PTS XS channel on YouTube.)
- Liu Kuan ting as First Brave: a bloodthirsty human who later becomes the first of the braves after killing a raid of dragons.
  - Kuan-ting also voices Sorry Brave, a cowardly brave who is the principal of the "Brave Guild", who also wants to retire.
- Sun Cheng as Business King: an oligarch who is the current king of the brave kingdom and responsible for giving pay to the braves for killing demons.
  - Cheng also voices Red Dragon: a formidable dragon who is Dragon Girl's uncle.
- Xu Huang Huang as War King: A warmongering king who after taking the old king place, he decided to eliminate all the demon race, he died after facing off Morewant in the last days of war.
- Ma Guo Yao as Old King: The king before War King, who wanted peace between Humans and Demons, but he was slayed by a mysterious demon, his death leading into a war.
  - Ma Guo also voices The Fallen Mad Demon: a crazy demon god who wants to destroy all braves and send the Demon Kingdom back to their greatness.
- Li Shi Yang as Blood King: a vampire demon king that serves as a psychologist, and also as an hypnotizer.
- Cheng Yu Shen as Lonely General: a lovely freak soldier created by the Magic Academy who has a great fascination to books.
- Li Yun Qing as Lady Boss: a female orc who wants to go to a war against the Braves for revenge of the death of her father. And who also is Water Demon's spiritual sister
- Chen Zhen Yu as Library Witch: a mage who works as an assistant in the Magic Academy and who has a crush with Lonely General, just to set him unconscious on a fantasy dream.
- Shao Zhen Yu as Lance Brave: a warrior brave who kills their enemies piercing their hearts.
- Yang Shi Ying as Disaster Brave: a psychopathic witch brave who likes to make chaos to the demons and is very close to Lance Brave.
- Hu Zhen Xi as Volcano Papa: an old man volcano humanoid who is a Popped Rice seller on the fire demon kingdom, he died in hands of Lance Brave.
  - Zheng Xi also voices Flame Hot Dog: A hotdog-humanoid demon, member of the Fire Demon's Trio and one of Fallen Mad Demon's henchmen. He only can says "You're right" all the time.
- Huang Tien-yu as Black Magic Sword: The Vice Dean of the Magic Academy and the leader behind the Blade Armor Corps project.

== Episodes ==
Season	Episodes	Originally released		
Season	Episodes	First released	Last released	Network
1	6	July 4, 2021	July 16, 2021	Public Television Service
2	6	August 23, 2025	September 6, 2025	Public Television Service

As ofJuly 4, 2021, six episodes of Brave Animated Series have been released.

=== Season 1 ===
No. overall	No. in season	Title	Directed by	Written by	Original release date	Prod. code
1	1	"This Isn't Right"	Yang Zi Ting	Yang Zi Ting	4 July 2021	1-01
The Braves must kill the demon king Morewant to achieve peace, but unexpected news about the human king leads them to question their loyalties.
2	2	"The way the world sees us…"	Yang Zi Ting	Yang Zi Ting	4 July 2021	1-02
Many years later, the Braves live on taxpayer money and do easy kills to level up. Vowing to stop them, a goblin and a slime find help along the way.
3	3	"What other choices do I have?"	Yang Zi Ting	Yang Zi Ting	11 July 2021	1-03
The Braves and the dragons are at war. Two dragon parents attempt to rescue their daughter, who has been taken hostage.
4	4	"Even though you're useless!"	Yang Zi Ting	Yang Zi Ting	11 July 2021	1-04
Goblin and Slime convince the young Brave terrorizing their village to join them as they set out to find a powerful weapon.
5	5	"We're the same…"	Yang Zi Ting	Yang Zi Ting	18 July 2021	1-05
Dragon Girl discovers the truth about the conflict between the Braves and the dragons.
6	6	"Look what he's like now!"	Yang Zi Ting	Yang Zi Ting	18 July 2021	1-06
Morewant encounters an old friend and settles unfinished business from 20 years ago.

=== Season 2 ===
No. overall	No. in season	Title	Directed by	Written by	Original release date	Prod. code
7	1	"The True Brave"	Yang Zi Ting	Yang Zi Ting	23 August 2025	2-01
One year after the first season, the Brave Encampment is in chaos. Forced to inherit the title of Brave, Dragon Brave allies with her superior, Sword Brave, to hunt down a fleeing traitor. Distrusting each other, the two fight side by side in ancient ruins, only to fall into an enemy trap at the altar of the Demon God.
8	2	"Fire Demon's freedom."	Yang Zi Ting	Yang Zi Ting	23 August 2025	2-02
Morewant attempts to lead the demons against the Braves, disappointing the pacifist Fire Demon, who leaves. He sets out on a journey to find his true self. Along the way, he encounters the newly awakened demon king, "The Fallen Mad Demon." Reunited after a long separation, the two embark on a road trip, only to face a conflict over the decision of "fight or not."
9	3	"Peace Overturned"	Yang Zi Ting	Yang Zi Ting	30 August 2025	2-03
The Fallen Mad Demon leads his army in a surprise attack on the Brave Kingdom, plunging humanity's "Peace Train" into flames. Faced with this crisis, the Guild Master, Sorry Brave, retreats. Dragon Brave and Sword Brave step forward, joining forces with Chief Brave and others to launch a thrilling counterattack aboard the speeding train.
10	4	"Demonic Psychological Counseling"	Yang Zi Ting	Yang Zi Ting	30 August 2025	2-04
As the brave forces are steadily losing ground, the demon people are drawn into the conflict by the radical tactics of the corrupted mad demon, forcing Morewant, who firmly believes in fairness, to struggle. At this time, the noble and sharp-witted psychologist Blood King appears, helping the Demon King to clarify his beliefs and responsibilities, embarking on a path of self-discovery and leadership.
11	5	"Lonely freak"	Yang Zi Ting	Yang Zi Ting	6 September 2025	2-05
Morewant's spell awakens a demonic freak in the magic academy. He discovers he's merely a test subject for the academy's vice-president, the Black Sword Magic, and is trapped in a dream conjured by the Librarian Witch. To embrace freedom, does the freak have the courage to escape the dream, step into reality, and save his future?
12	6	"Demon Flying Competition Commemorative Edition"	Yang Zi Ting	Yang Zi Ting	6 September 2025	2-06
As the Demon Clan's election day approaches, the two opposing factions are set to compete in a flying competition at a spring banquet. The pro-war Lady Boss fights for revenge, while the anti-war Dragon Slayer advocates for peace. What began as a tense confrontation unexpectedly becomes a moment of mutual understanding—it turns out that the Demon Clan can also be a family.

== Production ==
=== Season One ===
In 2018 the Ministry of Culture had raised funds for the creation of new animated series and adaptations of national comics and IP's, among the studios that participated in the external bidding process for the adaptations, on February 25, 2021, where the indie company Big Cat Studio announced an association with Yellow Book to produce an animated series of the comic book series "Brave Series". The series received a forward-looking budget subsidy of TWD44.2 million, of which 1 millionTWD was used for behind-the-scenes documentary shooting, having an average budget of 7.2 millionTWD per episode and being in production for over 2–3 years with the deconstruction and reorganization of the first 260 chapters of the original work into 6 episodes, with a writing period of about half a year. On April 12, with a teaser of the main character, later on April 16, the official Facebook account announced that the first season has finished production and it was ready to be released.

=== Season Two ===
After the success of the first season, on November 24, 2022, was announced that the series was renewed for a second season. Later on July 26, 2024, the official account announced that the season 2 is now in Post-Production and is set to release in some point of 2025. On April 17, 2025, the first teaser was released during commercial breaks on the official PTS channel, and it was announced that the season 2 will be released in summer. Later on April 25, another teaser trailer was released. On May 20 it's was revealed that the official first teaser trailer Is set to be released on May 22. On that day it was released the first official teaser trailer, revealing that the season 2 will be released in August on the official PTS XS YouTube channel, alongside the first season being released on July 19.

On July 22, the first trailer has been revealed, confirming that the second season will be released on August 23.

== Music ==
WeiFan Chang, who also composed the soundtrack from games like Detention and the single RE:IGNITE, was hired to compose the score for the series, for the soundtrack, Chang take some inspiration of the sounds of some 80's and 90's videogame consoles, alongside the sound design of a Gameboy (more specifically the Game Boy Advance), additionally, the main theme "The Demon King and the Brave." was composed by Mayday's singer Ashin as the music coordinator in association with the Taiwanese band LION. Also the score include songs like "An adventure that cannot be reborn" by Amazing Show, "World Records" by Wonfu, "Love Method" by Gugu Lu Siwei and Wei Jiaying and "Better Place" by EggPlantEgg. In Season 2, there where included songs like "Legend of the Shared Dish" by A拔 Alex, "Bad Boy" by A-Mei, "Free" by Chang Chen Yue, "Love in a Shared Dream" by Chen Pinling and "Take it Slow" by The Dinosaur Skin (featuring Crispy).

On March 25, 2025, The official account announced that Amazing Show will collab with them for the new season main theme, that will be released in the 2025 Megaport Music Festival from March 29 to March 30, 2025. The theme song being "Tales" for the opening credits and "Esemble" for the ending credits.

== Accolades ==
Award	Date of ceremony	Category	Nominated	Results	Ref.
57th Golden Bell Awards	October 22, 2022	Best Animated Show	"Brave Animated Series"	Won	
57th Golden Bell Awards	October 22, 2022	Best Sound Design (General Program)	Gao Wei Yan, Wei Fan Chang, Lin Xie Zhong	Nominated	
2026 Rockie Awards	June 16, 2026.	Best Animated Series	"Brave Animated Series"	Nominated	
9th ANIMAFILM International Animation Festival	May 17, 2026	Best Animated TV Series	"Brave Animated Series - Episode 3"	Runner-up	
61th Golden Bell Awards	October 25, 2026	Best Animated Show	"Brave Animated Series 2"	Nominated	
61th Golden Bell Awards	October 25, 2026	Best Sound Design	Kao Wei-yen, Lin Hsieh-chung, Wei Fan Chang, Chen Pin-ling, A拔 Alex	Nominated	
61th Golden Bell Awards	October 25, 2026	Best Art Design	Chen Wei Yuan	Nominated	

== Future ==
On July 25, 2021, in an interview with GNN Gamer, when they asked to Wang Wei Xiu if there are any plans for the future of the series, he responded: "Of course I hope there will be a second season of animation! At present, the comic series of Yellow Book is still in progress. I hope everyone can support it. [...] As for peripheral products, there are currently some plans in progress, and we ourselves are looking forward to the actual products."

After the success of the second season, on November 12, 2025, it was confirmed that a third season is now on production.
