= Meeting Dr. Sun =

2014 Taiwanese film by Yee Chih-yen

- Theatrical release poster
- Directed by: Yee Chih-yen
- Written by: Yee Chih-yen
- Produced by: Lieh Lee; Roger Huang; Yee Chih-yen
- Starring: Zhan Huai-yun; Matthew Wei
- Cinematography: Chen Ta-pu
- Edited by: Tu Min-chi
- Music by: Chris Hou
- Production companies: 1 Production Film; Lan Se Production
- Distributed by: Warner Bros. Pictures
- Release dates: 5 July 2014 (TFF); 11 July 2014 (Taiwan)
- Country: Taiwan
- Language: Mandarin

Meeting Dr. Sun (Chinese: 行動代號：孫中山) is a 2014 Taiwanese drama film written and directed by Yee Chih-yen. The film had its world premiere on 5 July 2014 at the 16th Taipei Film Festival, and theatrically released in Taiwan on 11 July 2014 by Warner Bros. Pictures. The film won Best Original Screenplay in the 51st Golden Horse Awards.

== Plot ==
The film revolves around two of Taipei's poorest high school students both attempt to steal an abandoned Sun Yat-sen bronze statue from the school's storage room.

== Cast ==
- Zhan Huai-yun as Lefty
- Matthew Wei as Sky
- Bryan Chang as Head of student affairs
- Joseph Chang as Security guard
- Lee Chien-na as Security guard's girlfriend
- Honduras as Sky's father
- River Huang
- Yang Shu-chun
- Hu Wei-jie
- Sean Shih

== Reception ==
Clarence Tsui of The Hollywood Reporter praised Meeting Dr. Sun as an artistically refined and politically relevant work that subtly weaves social critique into a seemingly lighthearted story, elevating it beyond typical high school dramas through its sharp social arguments and genre blending. Han Cheung of Taipei Times also regarded the film as a refreshing, socially conscious comedy that effectively combines humor and emotional depth to highlight Taiwan's social inequality, praising its poetic moments and strong thematic resonance.

Edmund Lee of the South China Morning Post described the film as a "heist flick staged with hilariously low stakes" that incorporates social commentary, appreciating its humor and themes of inequality but questioning whether its simplistic characters and symbolism may be overextended. Meanwhile, James Marsh of ScreenAnarchy considered the film a heartfelt, humorous coming-of-age story that playfully explores youth struggles, ultimately emphasizing personal growth and the enduring relevance of historical ideals.

Shinie Wang, writing for CommonWealth Magazine, acknowledged the film as a poignant and compassionate portrayal of Taiwan's social inequalities, using humor and symbolism to evoke empathy for marginalized youth. Hung Jian-luen of Funscreen Weekly also considered the film a well-intentioned but somewhat flawed social commentary that struggles with its tone and pacing, ultimately offering a heartfelt yet imperfect reflection on class and political issues. Tang Tang-mo of Okapi interpreted the film as a continuation of Taiwan's youth rebellion, highlighting its focus on economic struggles and resistance, with a tone of hope and camaraderie amidst social critique. Ching Sze-tsuen of Hong Kong Inmedia described the film as a sincere, slightly awkward coming-of-age story that effectively conveys young people's desire for change, despite its amateurish execution and bittersweet tone.

== Awards and nominations ==
Year	Award	Category	Nominee	Result	Ref.
2014	51st Golden Horse Awards	Best Original Screenplay	Yee Chih-yen	Won	
2014	51st Golden Horse Awards	Best New Performer	Matthew Wei	Nominated	
2014	16th Taipei Film Awards	Best Screenplay	Yee Chih-yen	Won	
2015	10th Osaka Asian Film Festival	Grand Prix	—N/a	Won	
2015	9th Asian Film Awards	Best Newcomer	Zhan Huai-yun	Nominated	
