= Let's Go Crazy on Live! =

- Promotional poster

Chinese name
- Traditional Chinese: 網紅的瘋狂世界
Transcriptions
Standard Mandarin
- Hanyu Pinyin: Wǎnghóng De Fēngkuáng Shìjiè
- Genre: Romantic comedy
- Written by: Chen Jie Ying 陳潔瑩 (Screenwriting coordinator); Huang Xuan Ying 黃宣穎; Ceng Xi Bao 曾喜寶 (Ep. 1, 5-20)
- Directed by: Hao Xin Xiang 郝心翔
- Starring: Ben Wu; Chloe Xiang; Jolin Chien; Belle Chuo
- Opening theme: Play Xia Mi Game (Play蝦米Game) by Glasses Men (眼鏡俠)
- Ending theme: How Could I Forget about You (如何忘記你) by Zhang Ruo Fan (張若凡)
- Country of origin: Taiwan
- Original language: Mandarin
- No. of seasons: 1
- No. of episodes: 20

Production
- Producers: Yang Hong Zhi 楊鴻志; Hao Xin Xiang 郝心翔; Ding Meng Long 丁夢龍
- Production location: Taiwan
- Running time: 90 minutes
- Production companies: Sanlih E-Television 三立電視; Deepwaters Digital Support Inc. 大川大立數位影音股份有限公司

Original release
- Network: TTV; SET Metro
- Release: 8 September 2019 – 19 January 2020

Related
- Back to Home; The Wonder Woman

Let's Go Crazy on LIVE is a 2019/2020 Taiwanese drama about an ordinary girl who is scouted by a CEO to become a famous influencer.

== Synopsis ==
As an ordinary girl, working an ordinary job, at an ordinary convenience store, Lin An An (Chloe Xiang) had only one dream in life: to find a good, stable, government job so she could support her aging grandfather. With that single dream in mind, An An never even thought of becoming anything more than the ordinary girl she had always been. But all that changed the day You Yuan Le (Ben Wu) walked into her life.

The CEO of a highly successful internet platform company, Yuan Le always had an eye for talent. The day he met An An, he knew she had what it took to become an online sensation; though not everyone at work agreed with him. Making a bet with one of his company's top internet stars, Yuan Le guarantees An An he can turn her into an internet celebrity.

Wanting nothing to do with Yuan Le or his ridiculous bet, An An had every intention of turning him down, but something inside her just wouldn't let her say no. Agreeing to work with Yuan Le, An An takes her first step into the spotlight as she embraces this chance dream bigger dreams and stops hiding from the world.

== Cast ==
=== Main cast ===
- Ben Wu as You Yuan Le 游元樂
- Chloe Xiang as Lin An An 林安安
  - Fan Rou (汎柔) as child Lin An An
- Jolin Chien as Ren Hao 任豪
- Belle Chuo (卓毓彤) as Ye Luo Sha 葉羅莎

=== Supporting Casts ===
- Shiny Yao (姚亦晴) as Cindy
- Li Xing Lu (李星鏴) as Zheng Mei Li 郝美麗
- Lin Jing Lun (林敬倫) as Tank 坦克
- Lin Jia Wei (林嘉威) as Princess Lia 莉亞公主
- Kerr Hsu as Simon 賽門
- Huang Yun Xin (黃云歆) as Marry 馬莉
- Michael Chang (張豐豪) as Chen Jia Bao 陳家寶
- Su Yan Ti (蘇妍緹) as Xiao Man 小蜜
- Wu You Xi (鄔又曦) as Claire 克萊兒
- Zhang Ruo Fan (張若凡) as herself

=== Cameos ===
- Zhang Jia Yun (張嘉雲) as madam Jing Jing 晶晶夫人
- Tang Chuan (唐川) as Lin Zhong Hua 林中華
- Kai Di KID (愷弟KID) as host
- Ma Guo Xian (馬國賢) as Peng Ci Wang
- Marcus Chang as Roy

== Soundtrack ==
- Play Xia Mi Game (Play蝦米Game) by Glasses Men (眼鏡俠)
- How Could I Forget about You (如何忘記你) by Zhang Ruo Fan (張若凡)
- The Song for You (給妳的歌) by Zhang Ruo Fan (張若凡)
- Attention (關注) by Glasses Men (眼鏡俠)
- Be Brave, Remember (記得勇敢) by Ciwas Ma (馬曉安)
- Do Not Look Back (不要回頭) by Ciwas Ma (馬曉安)
- From Child to Adult (從小到大) by Don Gin Band (動靜樂團)
- Still Love You by Marcus Chang

== Broadcast ==
Network	Country	Airing Date	Timeslot
TTV Main Channel	Taiwan	8 Sep 2019	Sunday 10:00-11:30 pm
Vidol	Taiwan	8 Sep 2019	Sunday 11:30 pm
iQiyi	Taiwan	9 Sep 2019	Sunday 12:00 am
Line TV	Taiwan	9 Sep 2019	Sunday 12:00 am
SET Metro	Taiwan	14 Sep 2019	Saturday 10:00-11:30 pm

== Ratings ==
Air Date	Episode	Average Ratings	Rank
Sep 9, 2019	1	0.79	1
Sep 15, 2019	2	0.90	1
Sep 22, 2019	3	0.91	1
Sep 29, 2019	4	0.99	1
Oct 6, 2019	5	1.01	1
Oct 13, 2019	6	0.97	1
Oct 20, 2019	7	0.81	1
Oct 27, 2019	8	1.04	1
Nov 3, 2019	9	1.06	1
Nov 10, 2019	10	0.90	1
Nov 17, 2019	11	1.03	1
Nov 24, 2019	12	0.92	1
Dec 1, 2019	13	0.81	2
Dec 8, 2019	14	1.00	2
Dec 15, 2019	15	0.80	3
Dec 22, 2019	16	0.74	3
Dec 29, 2019	17	0.77	3
Jan 5,2020	18	0.81	2
Jan 12,2020	19	0.83	2
Jan 19,2020	20	0.86	2
Average ratings		0.90	
