= Zhan Huai-yun =

Taiwanese actor (born 1998)

- 詹懷雲
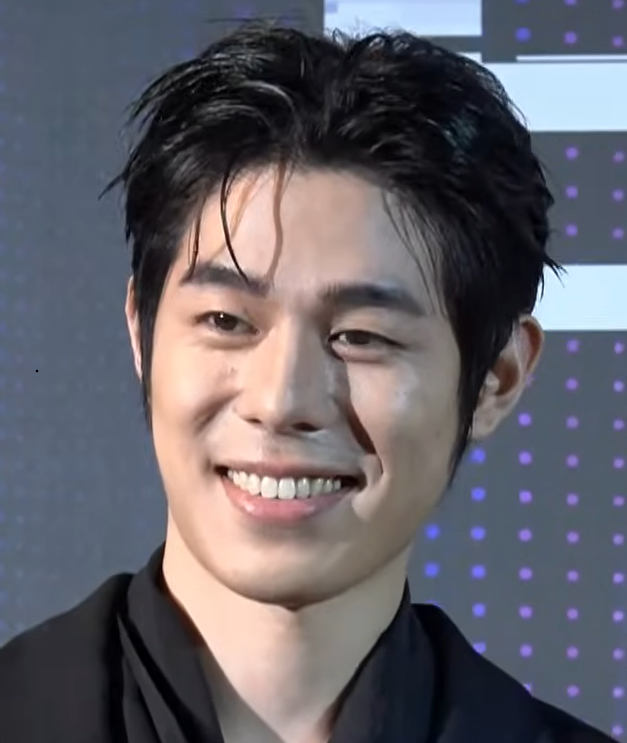
- Zhan in February 2026
- Born: 21 August 1998 (age 27); Taiwan
- Occupation: Actor
- Years active: 2013–present

Zhan Huai-yun (Chinese: 詹懷雲; born 21 August 1998) is a Taiwanese actor best known for his debut role as Lefty in the historical comedy film Meeting Dr. Sun (2013), which earned him a nomination for Best Newcomer in the 9th Asian Film Awards. He stepped away from showbiz in 2016 to pursue a career in rapping, and returned to acting in 2023 with the Netflix political thriller series Wave Makers. In 2024, he starred in another Netflix series Born for the Spotlight.

== Early life ==
Zhan was born on 21 August 1998. He grew up in the Sanzhi District of New Taipei City, and worked part-time at a café in Qianshuiwan since high school. Zhan was exposed to acting during junior high and high school, and he also began writing music in his freshman year. At the age of 15, he was discovered by a talent agent while shopping in Ximending and was invited to audition for Meeting Dr. Sun, where he won the role, making his acting debut at 16 in 2013.

== Career ==
Zhan made his acting debut alongside Matthew Wei as the male leads, Lefty and Sky, in the 2013 historical comedy film Meeting Dr. Sun. James Marsh of Screen Anarchy praised their performances, stating they did "a great job of winning [the audience's] sympathies", and Zhan received a nomination for Best Newcomer in the 9th Asian Film Awards for his role. Following his breakout role, he starred as the titular character Egg Boy in the romance film My Egg Boy, and landed a main role as Trumpet in the PTS television series The Sweet Place in 2016. However, Zhan stepped back from showbiz to pursue a music career that same year, releasing a rap song for LGBTQ+ rights and working as a professional rapper, sharing his music on YouTube. Zhan mentioned that the reason for his fade-out from acting was his mandatory acting classes imposed by his agency, which caused him to lose interest and develop a fear of performing, and he only began to recover from this during his rapping career. During this time, he also worked at construction sites, citing the "flexible schedule" as a reason. In 2022, he was named Top Talent by the Taipei Film Festival.

In 2023, Zhan returned to acting with a recurring role as a member of a presidential campaign team in the Netflix political thriller series Wave Makers. He also starred alongside Yitai Chu in Blue Lan's homosexual-themed romance film After School. The following year, he appeared in the Hong Kong ViuTV drama series The Floating Generation, and had a recurring role as He Wan-sheng in the HBO GO series The Accidental Influencer. He was cast in a main role as a hotel bellboy who has a sexual affair with Cheryl Yang's character in the Netflix drama series Born for the Spotlight, followed by a lead role in the drama film Penguin Girl, which premiered the same year. Zhan is set to have a recurring role in the upcoming Netflix mystery series Million-follower Detective.

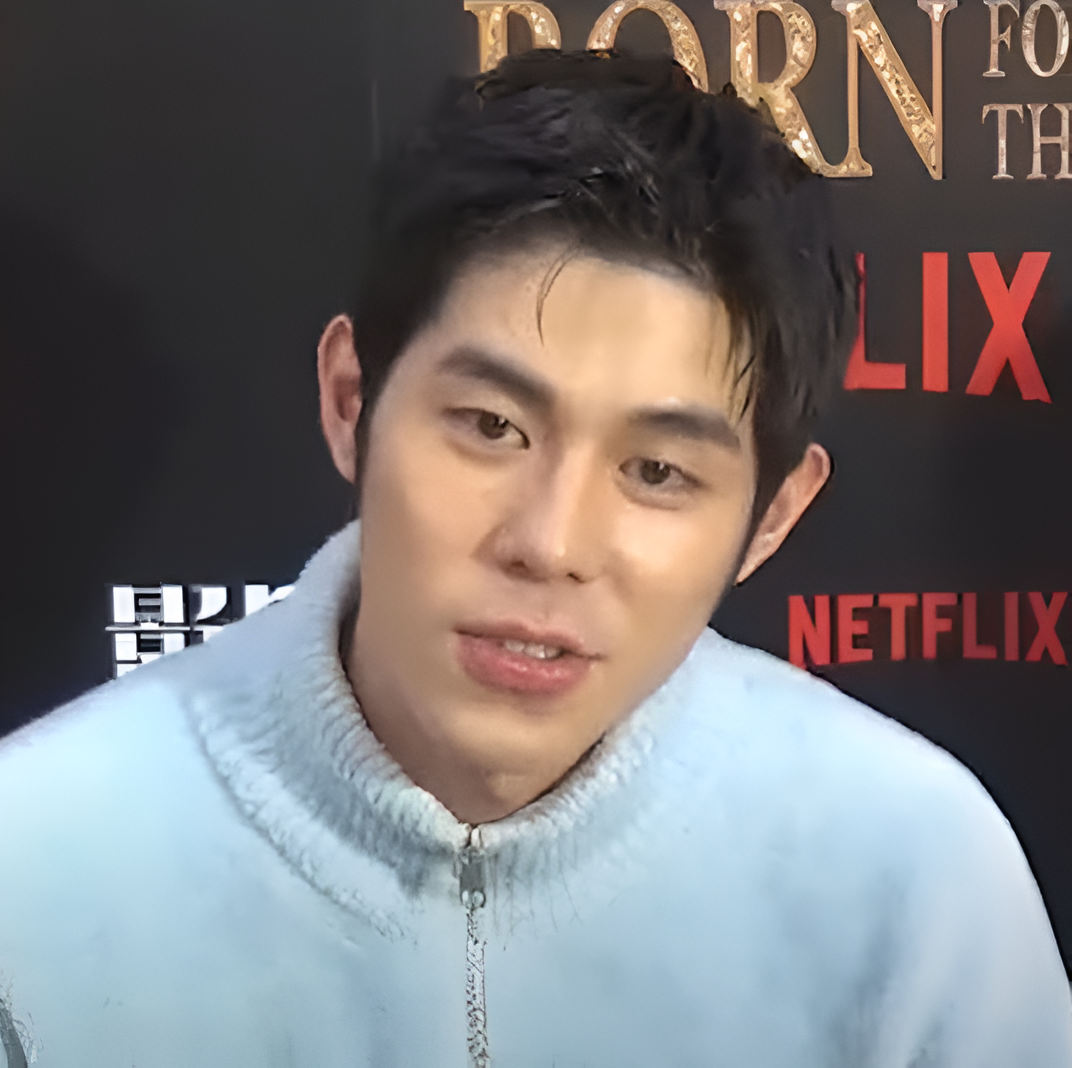
Zhan interviewed by SET News in November 2024

== Filmography ==
=== Film ===
| Year | Title | Role | Notes |
|---|---|---|---|
| 2013 | Meeting Dr. Sun | Lefty (阿左) | |
| 2016 | My Egg Boy | Egg Boy (蛋男) | |
| 2023 | After School | Chang Cheng-heng (張正恆) | |
| 2025 | Penguin Girl | He Deli (何德利) | |

=== Television ===
| Year | Title | Role | Notes |
|---|---|---|---|
| 2016 | The Sweet Place | Trumpet (喇叭) | Main role |
| 2023 | Wave Makers | Hsu Hsiang-kai (徐翔凱) | Recurring role |
| 2024 | The Accidental Influencer | He Wan-sheng (何萬生) | Recurring role |
| 2024 | The Floating Generation | Ian (伊仁) | Recurring role |
| 2024 | Urban Horror | Kuang (阿光) | Main role |
| 2024 | Born for the Spotlight | Tseng Ya-hsin (曾雅欣) | Main role |
| 2026 | Million-follower Detective | Kao Chih-ping (高志平) | Recurring role |

== Awards and nominations ==
| Year | Award | Category | Work | Result | Ref. |
|---|---|---|---|---|---|
| 2015 | 9th Asian Film Awards | Best Newcomer | Meeting Dr. Sun | Nominated | |
