= The Uniform =

2024 Taiwanese film by Chuang Ching-shen

- Theatrical release poster
- Traditional Chinese: 夜校女生
- Directed by: Chuang Ching-shen
- Screenplay by: Hsu Hui-fang; Wang Li-wen
- Produced by: David Tang
- Starring: Buffy Chen; Chloe Xiang
- Cinematography: Chen Chi-wen
- Edited by: John Chin
- Music by: Sing Wu
- Production company: Renaissance Films
- Distributed by: Renaissance Films
- Release dates: 5 October 2024 (BIFF); 28 February 2025 (Taiwan)
- Running time: 110 minutes
- Country: Taiwan
- Language: Mandarin

The Uniform (Chinese: 夜校女生) is a 2024 Taiwanese drama film directed by Chuang Ching-shen and written by Hsu Hui-fang and Wang Li-wen. Starring Buffy Chen and Chloe Xiang, the film revolves around two girls in the day and night programs of the same school who fall in love with the same boy.

The film had its world premiere at the 29th Busan International Film Festival on 5 October 2024, and was theatrically released in Taiwan on 28 February 2025.

== Plot ==
In 1997, Ai underperforms on her high school entrance exam and reluctantly enrolls in the night program of the prestigious First Girl's High School under her mother's pressure. Sharing classrooms with day students during their freshman year, Ai meets her deskmate, Min, who shares her interests. Despite the day students' feelings of superiority, Min reassures Ai that she is not elitist, and they quickly become best friends.

Ai works part-time at a table tennis coaching school on Sundays to repay her family's debt after her father passes away. Shortly after the semester begins, she meets Luke, a wealthy boy from another prestigious high school. New to table tennis, Luke is assigned to Ai for coaching. Impressed by her skills, he soon falls for her. One night, Min invites Ai to skip class to watch a basketball match. However, Ai injures herself sneaking off campus and gets caught. To avoid consequences, Min suggests they exchange uniforms to disguise themselves as students from the other program. Initially scared of getting caught, Ai gains confidence after a few successful attempts.

Later, Min invites Ai to skip class again to meet a boy she likes, who turns out to be Luke. Min introduces Ai as her classmate, and Luke admits he remembers her from table tennis. The trio bonds and starts hanging out, with Luke increasingly interested in Ai. He visits the table tennis school regularly, and they coincidentally play doubles together. After winning a match, the coach invites them to a competition, prompting them to practice weekly. When Luke asks Ai out on a date, Ai alters her uniform’s class name to distinguish it from Min's. Jealous, Min suggests they visit Luke's mother's gallery in an attempt to expose Ai. At the gallery, Min cues Ai when Luke's mother mentions the night program, hoping to provoke a reaction. Things escalate when a university professor, whom Ai falsely claims is her mentor, reveals she doesn't know Ai. With her identity exposed, Ai leaves in tears. The next day, she returns her uniform to Min and quits her job at the table tennis school to avoid Luke. Compounding her troubles, Ai's mother discovers the academic reports Ai has been hiding, leading to an argument where Ai blames her mother for forcing her into night school.

Promoted to her third year, Ai bumps into Luke at the school's open day. He confesses his love for her regardless of her status, but Ai insists they come from different worlds. Meanwhile, Ai's uncle falls ill, prompting her mother to visit him. When a massive earthquake strikes, Ai rushes home to check on her sister, finding her safe under a cupboard. They reconcile upon her mother's return. While cleaning up after the earthquake, Ai finds a keychain that resembles Min's. Worried, she rushes to Min's class and discovers that Min is unharmed. The long-silent deskmates reconnect, sharing their struggles and bonding once again.

Ai works hard for her university entrance exam, seeing improvements in her grades. During the exam, she meets Luke, who gives up his admission quota to join her world. They reconcile and exchange lucky charms. Finally, Ai receives a satisfying college offer and celebrates her 18th birthday with Min and Luke.

== Cast ==
- Buffy Chen as Ai, a struggling high school student in the night program of a prestigious school
- Chloe Xiang as Min, a day student who shares a desk with Ai
- Yitai Chiu as Luke, an elite male student admired by both Ai and Min
- Chi Chin as Ai's mother

== Production ==
In November 2021, a screenplay draft written by Hsu Hui-fang won the Excellent Screenplay Award in the 43rd Golden Harvest Awards. Documentary filmmaker Chuang Ching-shen joined the project after reading the screenplay and was mesmerized by the nostalgic vibes and the portrayal of academic challenges in the 1990s that he experienced in his adolescence. The film is set against the backdrop of the 1999 Jiji earthquake, which Chuang had previously produced a documentary on. The film was subsequently announced for development by Renaissance Films, with funding of NTD$10 million from the Bureau of Audiovisual and Music Industry Development and NTD$3 million from the Department of Cultural Affairs, Taipei City Government.

Principal photography began in July 2023, with Buffy Chen spotted filming on Roosevelt Road in Taipei on 17 July. Location shooting also took place at New Taipei City, and filming wrapped in September. In October, Chloe Xiang reportedly suffered from depression during the shoot, which caused urticaria and hair loss, necessitating hospitalization. Distribution rights for Korea and Japan were sold during the Busan International Film Festival in October 2024, and a teaser was released in the same month.

== Release ==
The Uniform premiered in the Teen Spirit, Teen Movie section at the 29th Busan International Film Festival on 5 October 2024, marking its world premiere, followed by a screening at the 2024 Golden Horse Film Festival on 10 November. The film was initially announced to be released in January 2025, and is subsequently rescheduled for a theatrical release in Taiwan on 28 February 2025.

== Reception ==
Wen Tien-hsiang, writing for Mirror Media, rated The Uniform 85/100 and praised the film for its "unique perspective" among the "Taiwanese coming-of-age genre that is good but also rigid", and for Buffy Chen and Chloe Xiang's performances which are "both refreshing and well-calculated". Whang Yee Ling of The Straits Times gave the film 3/5 stars and also found the film "perfectly cast and believably rendered", particularly Buffy Chen portraying her character's "rewarding four-year journey watching petulant, insecure Ai learn hard work and responsibility and grow into herself".

Lee Kuang-chueh, reviewing for Yahoo! Lifestyle, lauded the film for its "delicate exploration revealing how class differences and social labels influence teenagers' self-identity" and "replicating 1990s Taiwanese popular culture and class issues", which explored on "the inescapable class stratification in Taiwan's education". Chen Wei-guang of Sin Chew Daily commended the film's "impressive recreation of the nostalgic atmosphere", and having a unique "comparison between day schools and night schools", giving the plot "an unconventional development".

== Awards and nominations ==
Year	Award	Category	Nominee	Result	Ref.
2021	43rd Golden Harvest Awards	Excellent Screenplay Award	—N/a	Won	
