= Buffy Chen =

Taiwanese actress (born 2000)

- 陳姸霏
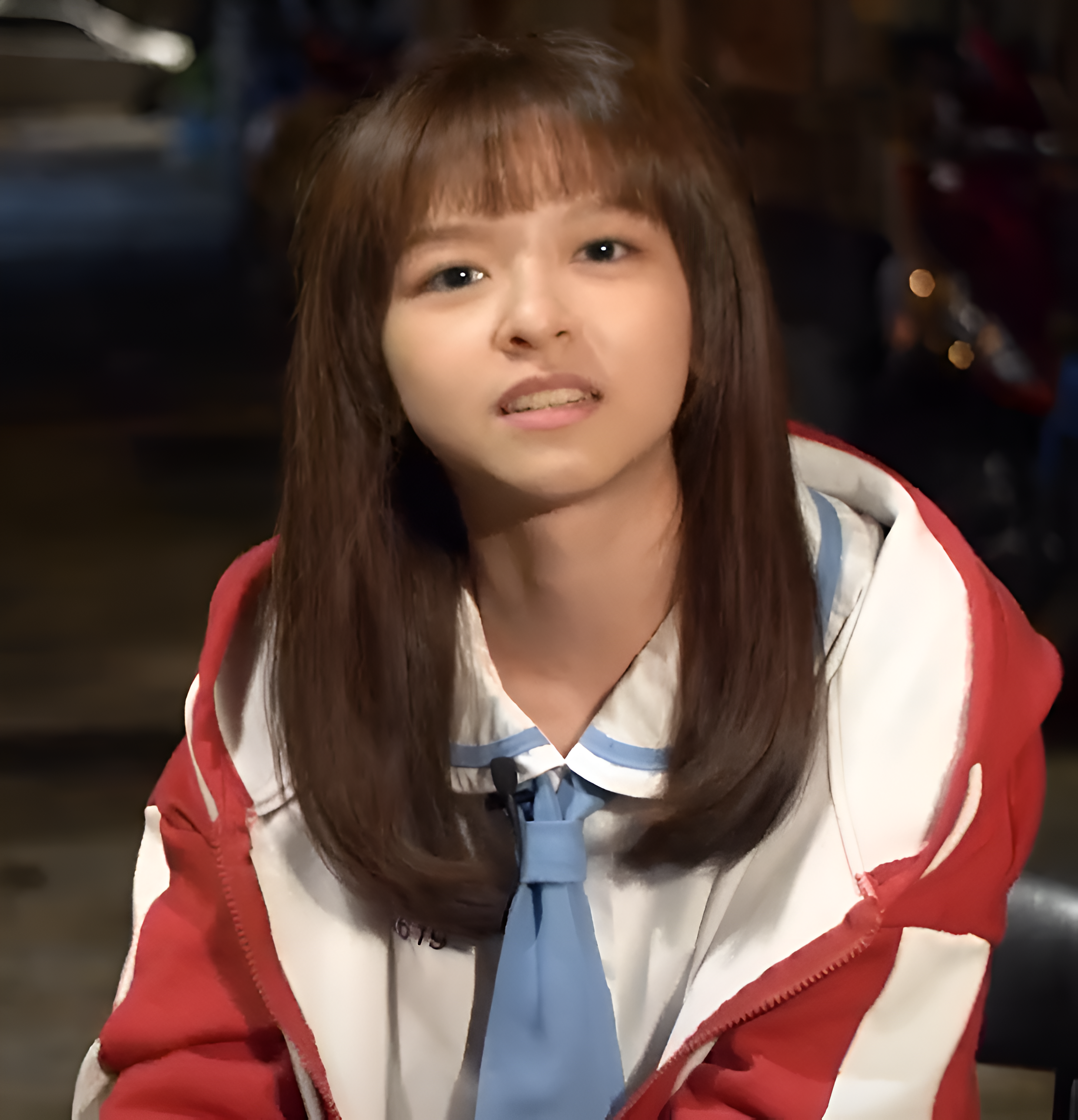
- Chen in April 2022
- Born: Chen Yan-fei; 9 August 2000 (age 26); Taiwan
- Education: Chinese Culture University
- Occupation: Actress
- Years active: 2020–present

Buffy Chen Yan-fei (Chinese: 陳姸霏; born 9 August 2000) is a Taiwanese actress. Debuting as Yao Bei-bei in the drama film The Silent Forest (2020) while still in university, Chen won Best New Performer in the 57th Golden Horse Awards and Best New Talent in the 23rd Taipei Film Awards with the role. Since then, Chen has starred in various productions, including the drama film Little Big Women (2020), the mystery thriller series The Pond (2021), and the fantasy series Twisted Strings (2022). She won Rising Star of the Year in the 5th Asia Contents Awards for her portrayal of Zoe Chao in the Netflix political thriller series Wave Makers (2023).

== Early life and education ==
Chen was born on 9 August 2000, and grew up with an elder sister. Her mother worked as a special education needs teacher at a junior high school. Chen started learning modern dance at a young age, and aspired to become a dance teacher. She joined her elementary school's dance team and performed on stage, an experience she found enjoyable. During junior high school, Chen dedicated much of her time to studying at cram school. Finding the academe too demanding, Chen opted to apply to Hwa Kang Arts School for high school instead. Chen landed a minor acting role in a drama series in her third year of junior high school, sparking her interest in acting. Her passion for acting grew further after taking drama classes at Hwa Kang. After graduating from the performing arts program at Hwa Kang, Chen enrolled at Chinese Culture University, majoring in advertising design, but suspended her studies during her freshman year in 2020 after winning an acting role in the drama film The Silent Forest that coincided with exam period.

== Career ==
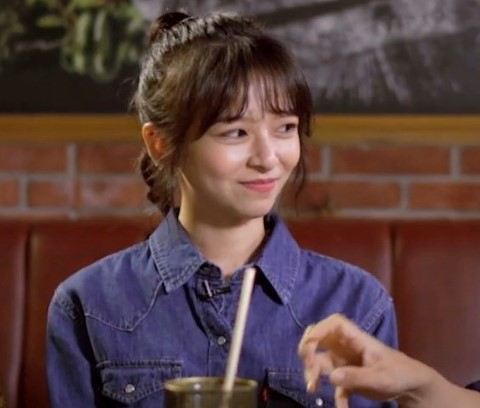
Chen interviewed by Elle Taiwan in November 2020

In 2020, Chen auditioned and won her breakout role as Bei-bei, a deaf teenage girl who was sexually assaulted by her classmates, in the featured film The Silent Forest. In preparation for her role, Chen spent three months learning sign language. Her performance, which conveyed tension and a sense of tragedy without dialogue, garnered positive acclaim, and she won Best New Performer in the 57th Golden Horse Awards and Best New Talent in the 23rd Taipei Film Awards with the role. Chen also starred in the drama film Little Big Women alongside Chen Shu-fang, Hsieh Ying-xuan, Vivian Hsu, and Sun Ke-fang, where she played Clementine, the rebellious daughter of Vivian Hsu's character who was reluctantly being planned to study abroad, in the same year. She joined the shoot of Little Big Women five days after filming wrapped up for The Silent Forest.

Chen began to receive film role offers after her breakout performance, and signed with an artist agency to officially debut as an actress, albeit facing doubts on her decision to pursue a career as an actress by her mother in early stages. In 2021, Chen landed her first major television role as A Ni, the female protagonist and a deviant schoolgirl who unexpectedly triggered a series of time-traveling incidents in a car accident, in the mystery thriller series The Pond. She also appeared in a recurring role as a pregnant schoolgirl forced to abort her child at her mother's request in the sci-fi series 2049－The Hedgehog Effect, and had a minor role as Rexen Cheng's character's daughter in the crime thriller series Danger Zone. Chen also starred as the lead actress in the opening short film Be My Quarantine at the 2021 Kaohsiung Film Festival, and in the music video of Oaeen's "Honey Ginseng" alongside Miao Ke-li.

In 2022, Chen took on a recurring role as Wen, a mute girl confined by Lee Kang-sheng's character in a dungeon since a young age in the fantasy series Twisted Strings. She received nominations for both Best New Actress and Best Supporting Actress in the 4th Asia Contents Awards with the role. Chen was cast in another lead role as Zoe Chao, the innocent daughter of a presidential candidate who gets dragged into a political scandal, in the 2023 Netflix political thriller series Wave Makers, starring alongside Hsieh Ying-xuan, Jag Huang, Gingle Wang, and Leon Dai. Her performance was well received, for which she won the Rising Star of the Year and was nominated for Best Supporting Actress at the 5th Asia Contents Awards & Global OTT Awards. In 2024, Chen starred in a supporting role as Hsiao-ting, a co-worker of Greg Hsu's character at a karaoke bar, in the Taiwanese-Japanese romance film 18×2 Beyond Youthful Days. She also appeared alongside her The Silent Forest co-star Troy Liu in the second season of the Netflix crime series The Victims' Game as Hsiao Chia-ying, a runaway girl who steals a bus with her friends to escape her parents' control, and her performance received critical acclaim. The same year, Chen appeared as the lead actress in the drama film The Uniform, which premiered at the Busan International Film Festival. She also starred in lead roles in the Netflix series Agent from Above and Million-Follower Detective.

== Personal life ==
Chen resides in Taipei.

== Filmography ==
=== Film ===
Year	Title	Role	Notes/Ref.
2020	The Silent Forest	Yao Bei-bei (姚貝貝)	
2020	Little Big Women	Clementine Yang (楊奕澄)	
2024	18×2 Beyond Youthful Days	Hsiao-ting (小婷)	
2024	The Uniform	Peng Yun-ai (彭芸愛)	

=== Television ===
Year	Title	Role	Notes/Ref.
2016	Rock Records In Love	Huan Huan (歡歡)	Guest role
2021	The Pond	A Ni (阿妮)	Main role
2021	2049－The Hedgehog Effect	Gu Bei-bei (古貝貝)	Recurring role
2021	Danger Zone	Cao Qing (曹晴)	Guest role
2022	Twisted Strings	Wen (文文)	Recurring role
2023	Wave Makers	Zoe Chao (趙蓉之)	Main role
2024	The Victims' Game	Hsiao Chia-ying (蕭家穎)	Recurring role (season 2)
2026	The Lives We Lease	He Hsing-chi (何幸琪)	Main role
2026	Haunted House Secrets	Bi Mo-yu (畢墨雨)	Main role
2026	Million-Follower Detective	Chen You-jie (陳宥潔)	Main role
2026	Agent from Above	Yeh "Leafy" Chih-ling (葉芝苓 / 葉子)	Main role
2026	Bloody Smart	Chao Chia-chi (趙佳琦)	Main role

== Awards and nominations ==
Year	Award	Category	Work	Result	Ref.
2020	57th Golden Horse Awards	Best New Performer	The Silent Forest	Won	
2021	2nd Taiwan Film Critics Society Awards	Best Actress	The Silent Forest	Nominated	
2021	12th Youth Film Manual Annual Ceremony	Yearly New Performer	The Silent Forest	Won	
2021	12th Youth Film Manual Annual Ceremony	Yearly Actress	The Silent Forest	Nominated	
2021	15th Asian Film Awards	Best Newcomer	The Silent Forest	Nominated	
2021	23rd Taipei Film Awards	Best New Talent	The Silent Forest	Won	
2022	4th Asia Contents Awards	Best Supporting Actress	Twisted Strings	Nominated	
2022	4th Asia Contents Awards	New Comer – Actress	Twisted Strings	Nominated	
2023	5th Asia Contents Awards & Global OTT Awards	Best Supporting Actress	Wave Makers	Nominated	
2023	5th Asia Contents Awards & Global OTT Awards	Rising Star of the Year	Wave Makers	Won	
