= Million-Follower Detective =

2026 Taiwanese television series

- Promotional poster

Chinese name
- Traditional Chinese: 百萬人推理
Transcriptions
Standard Mandarin
- Hanyu Pinyin: bái wàn rén tuī lǐ
- Genre: Crime thriller
- Written by: Shaun Su
- Directed by: Shaun Su
- Starring: Ekin Cheng; Shou Lo; Patty Lee; Wang Po-chieh; Lee Lee-zen; Buffy Chen
- Country of origin: Taiwan
- Original language: Mandarin
- No. of seasons: 1
- No. of episodes: 8

Production
- Production companies: Bossdom Digiinnovation; Gift Pictures

Original release
- Network: Netflix
- Release: 12 February 2026

Million-Follower Detective (Chinese: 百萬人推理), is a Taiwanese crime thriller television series. The series is directed and written by Shaun Su and stars Ekin Cheng, Shou Lo, Patty Lee, Wang Po-chieh, Lee Lee-zen and Buffy Chen in the lead roles.

The series premiered on Netflix on 12 February 2026.

== Premise ==
A mysterious woman rises to fame and becomes a powerful influencer after accurately foretelling the murders of several social-media influencers.

== Cast ==
=== Main ===
- Ekin Cheng as Chen Chia-jen, a lone-wolf police detective
- Shou Lo as Lin "Youzi" Ting-yu, a million-follower social media influencer
- Patty Lee as Li Hsin-ping, a veteran police detective and the head of Criminal Investigation Team
- Wang Po-chieh as Kuo Ta Fu
- Lee Lee-zen as He Chen Wei
- Buffy Chen as Chen You-jie, Chen Chia-jen's daughter
- Zhan Huai-yun as Kao Chih Ping
- Chloe Xiang as Li Ting-En
- Lyan Cheng as Yei Pin Hsuan

=== Recurring ===
- Chang Yung-cheng as Chang Chie
- Kao Ying-hsuan as A Hua
- Chou Ming-yu as A Li
- Kent Tsai as Wei Yan
- Isaac Yang as Liu Yan Hua

In addition, Taiwanese YouTubers Tseng Wen-han, Qian Qian, Linda Lin, Chiang Chih-wei and Ironbull make cameo appearances.

== Production ==
=== Development ===
In March 2022, Hong Kong actor Ekin Cheng was seen on set in Eastern District of Taipei, Taiwan. Bossdom Digiinnovation denied the rumours that he would be appearing in the third season of Light the Night in the same month and confirmed Cheng's involvement in an upcoming crime thriller series. Bossdom and Gift Pictures announced the series in April as part of the Taipei Golden Horse Film Project Promotion. The series would be directed and written by Shaun Su and starred Cheng, Shou Lo, Patty Lee, Wang Po-chieh, Lee Lee-zen and Buffy Chen in lead roles. On 26 July 2022, Chang Yung-cheng, Kao Ying-hsuan, Chou Ming-yu, Kent Tsai, Isaac Yang and Zhan Huai-yun were added to the cast.

=== Filming ===
Principal photography began in March 2022 in Taipei, Taiwan, and took place at Red House Theater and Neihu District. Filming wrapped in late May.

== Release ==
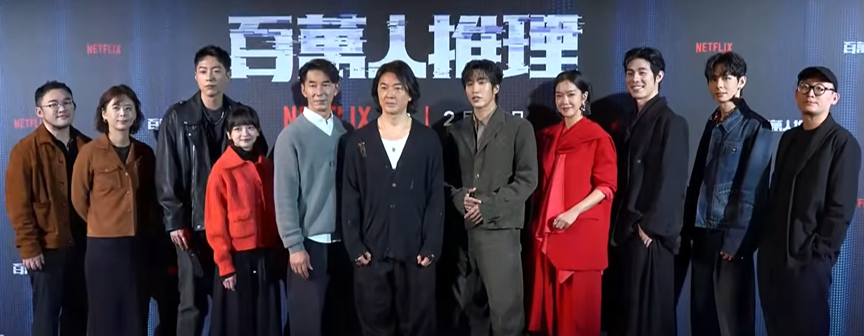
The cast and crew at press conference in February 2026

The series premiered on Netflix on 12 February 2026.

== Reception ==
Joel Keller of Decider described Million-Follower Detective as a "standard, albeit intriguing, crime thriller" that, while touching on themes of social media, ultimately lacks social commentary on influencer culture, resulting in a "straightforward murder mystery".
