= Big Cat Studio =

Taiwanese animation studio

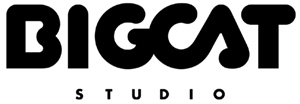
- logo used since 2018
- Native name: 大貓工作室
- Industry: Animation
- Founded: 2012
- Founder: Wang Wei Xiu
- Headquarters: Taipei city, Taiwan
- Website: Facebook. Instagram.

Big Cat Studio Co., Ltd. (Chinese: 大貓工作室股份有限公司 Pinyin: Dà māo gōngzuò shì yǒuxiàn gōngsī) (also known as Big Cat Studio, and formerly Big Cat Studio Ltd.) is a Taiwanese Independent animation studio based in Taipei, Taiwan. The studio was established in 2012 by Wang Wei Xiu. It is best known for creating the animated fantasy comedy show Brave Animated Series.

== History ==
Big cat was founded on December 25, 2012, by Wang Wei Xiu, in 2014 Big cat released his first short film "First Launch" who has been praised by his animation and has been selected in the Taipei Golden Horse Film Festival of 2014, later in 2018 Wei Xiu collaborated with Yang Zi Ting in the short film "Our Moon" which has been selected in the South Taiwan Film Festival.

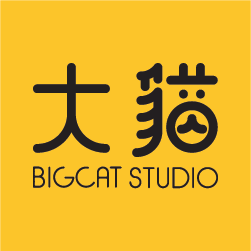
Logo used from 2013 to 2017.

In 2019 Big Cat collaborated with Fourdesire and Public Television Service for his first animated series "Diego and Pea", (Note: in a entrevist with Line Today, Wei Xiu said that the protagonists were inspired in his two cats pets.) which it was released on July 14, 2019, (Note: This date coincides with the 20th anniversary of the release of Mayday's first album.) the series was well received by the Taiwanese audience.

Later on July 4, 2021, in association with Aries Creative they released his most recognized project "Brave Animated Series", which is based on the comic book series by Yellow Book, the series was praised by the audience and won to Best Animated Series in the 57th Golden Bell Awards, on September 1, 2021, the series was released worldwide on Netflix. However, due to the expiration of a 3 -year distribution contract, the series was removed from the catalog on August 31, 2024, currently all episodes can be seen on YouTube. In 2022, the series was renewed for a second season, and it's set to be released in August 2025.

Additionally on September 12, 2021, in association with the Ministry of Science and Technology of Taiwan, they released "The Brainly Giant" an educational animated series who combine the teachings about the brain with a Detective fiction history, it was released first in PTS 3 and later in FTV.

On July 31, 2024, it was revealed that Big Cat Studio and Aries Creative will produce and animate the sequel of the 1988 film "Grandma and her Ghosts", The sequel was produced through a fundraising campaign that ran from September 6 to October 15. The project reached its goal on September 16, (Note: 10 days after the fundraising began.) raising a total of NT$13.1 million.

== Filmography ==
=== Television ===
| Year | English title | Original title | Network | Director | Notes | References |
|---|---|---|---|---|---|---|
| 2019 | Diego and Pea | 德哥與皮皮 | Public Television Service | Wang Wei Xiu | In association with Fourdesire | |
| 2021 | Brave Animated Series | 勇者動畫系列 | Public Television Service | Yang Zi Ting | In association with Aries Creative | |
| 2021 | The Brainly Giant | 科學腦巨人 | Public Television Service FTV | Yang Zi Ting | In association with Aries Creative and Ministry of Science and Technology | |

=== Films ===
| Year | English title | Original title | Distributed by | Director | ref. |
|---|---|---|---|---|---|
| 2026 | Grandma and her Ghosts 2: Baby Power | 魔法阿媽2：魔法小豆苗 | Paddy Film studio | Wang Shaudi | |

=== Short films ===
| Year | English title | Original title | Director | Ref |
|---|---|---|---|---|
| 2014 | First Launch | 七點半的太空人 | Wang Wei Xiu | |
| 2017 | Our Moon | 我們的月亮 | Yang Zi Ting | |
