= Donnie Chun-Yu Lai =

Taiwanese film director

Chun-Yu Lai (Chinese: 賴俊羽) is a Taiwanese film director.

== Life and career ==
Born in 1978, Lai is a Taiwanese film director and a visual effects artist who holds a master's degree from the School of Film and New Media at Taipei National University of the Arts. He has directed short films and received awards at the Taipei Film Festival.

In 2007, he won the Best Visual Effects Award at the Golden Horse Awards for his film Secret. His first feature film, Campus Confidential, released in 2013, hit NT$10 million at the box office.

== Filmography ==
| Year | Title | Role | | | | |
|---|---|---|---|---|---|---|
| 2006 | Silk | Video assistant | | | | |
| 2006 | My Football Summer | Art Director | | | | |
| 2007 | Secret | Second Assistant Director | Visual Effects Supervisor | 2010 | The Long Goodbye | Assistant Director |
| 2009 | Ayu | Director | | | | |
| 2012 | Before | Director | | | | |
| 2013 | Campus Confidential | Director | | | | |
| 2016 | Summer's Desire | Director | | | | |
| 2016 | An Odyssey of Dreams | Director | | | | |
| 2019 | Where The River Flows | Director | | | | |
| 2020 | Futmalls.com | Director | | | | |

== Awards ==
| Year | Award |
|---|---|
| 2004 | Taipei Film Festival Image Award |
| 2005 | Taipei Film Festival Image Award |
| 2007 | Golden Horse Award for Best Visual Effects |
