= Yee Chih-yen =

Taiwanese film director

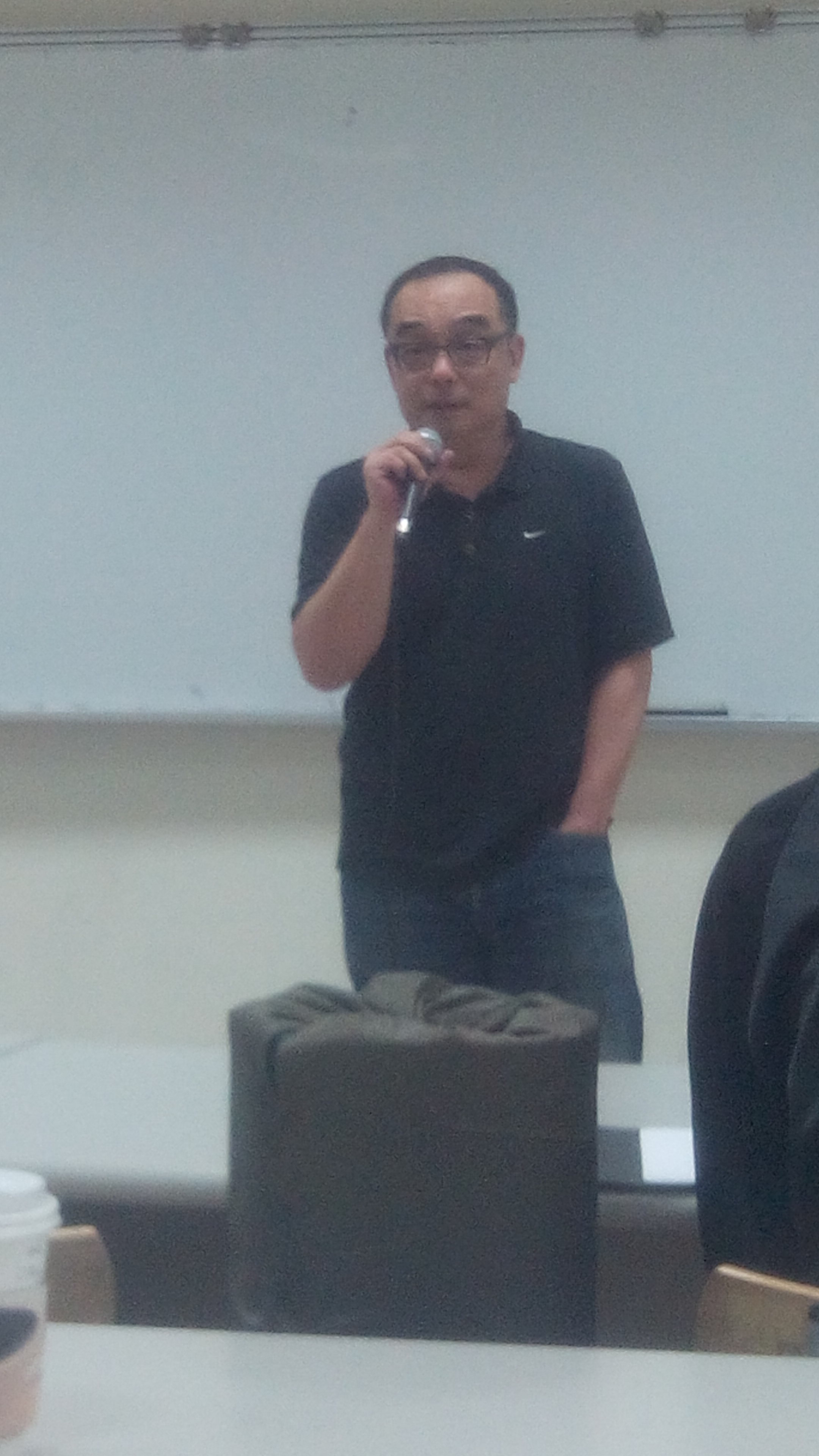
Yee Chih-yen

Yee Chih-yen (Chinese: 易智言; pinyin: Yì Zhìyán; born 21 November 1959) is a Taiwanese film director, screenwriter, critic, instructor, and writer. He was born in Taipei, Taiwan. His works include Blue Gate Crossing (2002), Dangerous Mind (2006), Chih-yen's television debut for the Taiwan Public Television Service that won Best Television Series at the Golden Bell Awards, Meeting Dr. Sun (2014), which won Best Original Screenplay at the Golden Horse Film Festival and Awards, as well as City of Lost Things (2020), which won Best Animated Feature at the Golden Horse Film Festival and Awards.

== Biography ==
Yee Chih-yen was born in Taipei, Taiwan, where he also completed his undergraduate studies in English (formerly Western Languages and Literature) at the National Chengchi University. He then completed a Master of Fine Arts degree in Film at the University of California, Los Angeles (UCLA) between 1983 and 1988. He has received many awards for his directorial works in both feature length films and commercial advertisements. Among his feature length works, he mostly crafts coming of age stories of queer teenagers. His cinematic works often revolve around prominent themes that concentrate on the socioeconomic and cultural influences that shape the young characters' experiences. He is a strong advocate for marriage equality and has publicly spoken about the issue. Yee Chih-yen is the current chairman of the Taipei Film Festival (TFF). On November 30, 2016, Yee Chih-yen came out as gay through a public Facebook post on his own page.

== Career ==
Yee Chih-yen started working at the Central Motion Picture Corporation as a producer and director after returning to Taiwan as a MFA in Film. In addition to creating many popular television commercials, he also received China Times Advertisement Awards for his commercial productions.

In 1995, Yee Chih-yen made his directorial feature-length film debut with the Lonely Hearts Club. It was not a box office success, as the film deals with topics the public was disinterested in, such as queer identities and coming of age stories. However, the film was screened and nominated in multiple international film festivals, including the Toronto International Film Festival and the International Film Festival Rotterdam, and even winning the Best Female Lead Award (Pai Bing-bing) at the International Film Festival Prague – FEBIOFEST.

In 2002, Yee Chih-yen directed Blue Gate Crossing, which saw both commercial and critical success. Featuring young actors Chen Bolin and Gwei Lun-mei, who he will frequently collaborate with in the future, Yee Chih-yen tells the coming of age struggles of queer teenagers. The film was screened at many film festivals, including being nominated at the Tokyo International Film Festival, the Hong Kong Film Award, the GLAAD Media Award, and the Bratislava International Film Festival. It won the Special Jury Prize at the Bratislava International Film Festival. Blue Gates Crossing is Yee Chih-yen’s best known work.

In 2005, Yee Chih-yen collaborated with directors from Japan and China for the production of About Love, an omnibus film consists of three episodes. Yee Chih-yen directed the Taipei segment.

In 2006, Yee Chih-yen adapted Hou Wen-yong's same name novel into a television series: Dangerous Mind. The television series' depiction of the educational reform in Taiwan and its reflection on issues concerning Taiwanese teenagers were well received by the public. It also went on to win the Golden Bell Awards for Best Television Series and Best Male Actor the following year.

In 2011, City of Lost Things (2020), a feature length animation directed by Yee Chih-yen and produced by Lee Lieh won Top Prize for the Taipei Golden Horse Film Project Promotion. Adding to Yee Chih-yen's long emphasis on the younger generation, this animation also focuses on raising environmental awareness. City of Lost Things is Yee Chih-yen's first feature length animation. Due to its complex production and funding issues, its theatrical release was postponed from 2015 to 2021.

Yee Chih-yen’s fourth feature length film, Meeting Dr. Sun (2013), won Best Original Screenplay at the 2014 Golden Horse Awards. Its production and funding were supported by the Feature Film Subsidy funded by the Ministry of Culture of Taiwan.

In March 2021, Yee Chih-yen took over, from Mark Lee Ping-bing, as the Chairman of the Taipei Film Festival (TFF), for his role as a spearheading figure that strives for improvements in the Taiwanese film community, along with consistent recognition in young emerging filmmakers.

In May 2021, Yee Chih-yen’s first animated film, City of Lost Things, was nominated at the Annecy International Animation Film Festival and the Stuttgart Trickfilm International Animated Film Festival (ITFS). It also won Best Animated Feature at the 57th Golden Horse Awards, along with Best Animated Feature, Best Artistic Direction, Best Costume Design, and Best Special Effects at the Taipei Film Festival.

== Experience ==
- B.A. in English (formerly Western Languages and Literature), National Chengchi University
- M.F.A. in Film and Television Production, University of California, Los Angeles (UCLA)
- Producer and Director at the Central Motion Picture Corporation in Taiwan
- Consultant, Sun Movie (Taiwan)
- Part-time Lecturer at the Taipei National University of the Arts, the Chinese Culture University, Shih Chien University, Fu Jen Catholic University, Shih Hsin University, and the Taipei National University of the Arts.

== Works ==
Commercials

- 1999 －《Uni-Enterprises Master Coffee commercial（Itatly ver.）》
- 1999 －《Coca-cola ad（Town ver.）》
- 2000 －《Coca-cola ad（Axle ver.）》
- 2000 －《McDonald’s ad（Spicy McChicken ver.）》
- 2000 － 2000 Presidential Election Campaign for James Soong

Feature Films

- 1994 － Lonely Hearts Club
- 2002 － Blue Gate Crossing
- 2005 －About Love: Taipei segment
- 2014 －Meeting Dr. Sun
- 2020 －City of Lost Things

Television Series

- 2006 － Dangerous Mind

Music Videos

- 2004 － Duihua Lianxi (Stella Chang)
- 2008 － Someone who loves you (Yoga Lin)

Books - Authored

- 2002 －Blue Gate Crossing Film Novel ISBN 957-733-757-0
- 2014 －Meeting Dr. Sun - Making of the Film ISBN 978-957-13-6004-1

Books - Translated

1994 －Alternative Script Writing: Beyond the Hollywood Formula ISBN 957-32-2242-6

== Awards ==
- Best Dramatic Feature, Meeting Dr. Sun (2014), Osaka Asian Film Festival
- Best TV series, Dangerous Mind (2007), Golden Bell Awards
- Outstanding Co-Production Film, About Love (2005), China Huabiao Film Awards
- Special Jury Prize, Blue Gate Crossing (2002), Bratislava International Film Festival

== Controversies ==
On November 25, 2018, drawing an sarcastic analogy between the legalization of same-sex marriages through a special law instead of the Civil Code and offering a master class limited to homosexual director and screenwriter only, Yee Chih-yen posted on Facebook, "In the future, we would only offer master class for homosexual directors and screenwriters only. No heterosexual attendees would be allowed. If heterosexual members would like to attend the class, they would have to listen from outside the window. I talk in very loud voice, so they would not have any issue hearing me. This mode of participation is specially designed for heterosexual members and it is inclusively designed without any discrimination. I am serious. (「未來要開一班只收同性戀學生的導演編劇課，不收異性戀。如異性戀要上課，他們要在窗外聽。我聲音很大，他們當然也可以聽到，這是為他們設計的專門辦法。這樣做，充滿愛很包容沒有歧視啊，我是認真的。」)"
