= Sun Ke-fang =

Taiwanese Actress

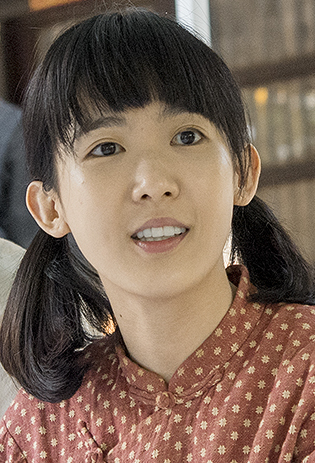
- Sun in 2017
- Born: Lai Yi Fan; November 2, 1987 (age 38); Tainan, Taiwan
- Occupation: Actress
- Years active: 2016–present
- Works: Close Your Eyes Before It's Dark; Little Big Women; Brave Animated Series
- Spouse: Liu Kuan-ting (m. 2023)

Sun Ke-fang (Chinese: 孫可芳; Pe̍h-ōe-jī: Sun Khó͘-hong; born November 2, 1987) (also known as BeanBean), is a Taiwanese actress. She is better known for acting in roles on cinema and television, she starred in television series like Brave Animated Series, On Marriage: Wishful Syncing, Born for the Spotlight , Living, The Accidental Influencer, and films like Little Big Woman, The Silent Forrest, My Eggy Boy, The Rope Curse, etc.

== Early life ==
Sun was born in November 2, 1987, in the Rende District, in Tainan, Taiwan. She attended the National Taiwan University of Arts in Taipei. after graduating, she participated in independent media like short films and multiple commercials.

== Career ==
In 2015, she was selected by Wang Shaudi, to participate in the antalogy series Qseries, in the shows Love of Sandstorm, Close Your Eyes Before It's Dark, and A Boy Named Flora A, getting more fame, and being selected in more films and dramas, and winning the Best Supporting Actress in a Television Series award in the 52nd Golden Bell Awards in 2017. The same year, she performed Lin Chun in What She Put on the Table. Being shortlisted for the 53rd Golden Bell Award.

In 2020, she starred in the Taiwanese drama film Little Big Women as the youngest daughter "Jia Jia" , and also starred the Idol drama I,Myself, being nominated in 56th Golden Bell Awards as Best Leading Actress in a Television Series, later in 2021 she provided the voice of Dragon Girl in the 57th Golden Bell Award-winning animated series Brave Animated Series. and reprising her role in the second season.

In 2022, she starred with Liu Kuan-ting on the drama series On Marriage: Wishful Syncing as Xie Ziya, and in 2024 starring in the HBO comedy series The Accidental Influencer as Clara. Being shortlisted again in the 59th Golden Bell Awards as Best Actress.

== Personal life ==
She married Liu Kuan-ting in August 22, 2023. Now with one children called "Little Sun".

== Filmography ==
=== Television series ===
Year	English title	Original title	Role	Notes
2014	Baby Daddy	長不大的爸爸	Commissioner Lin	Cameo
2015	Be With Me	舞吧舞吧在一起	Ice Girl	Cameo
2016	Love of Sandstorm	植劇場—戀愛沙塵暴	Bean	Cameo
2016	Close Your Eyes Before It's Dark	植劇場—天黑請閉眼	Liu Cheng-Fang	Supporting Actress
2017	A Boy Named Flora A	植劇場—花甲男孩轉大人	Sightseeing Guest	Cameo
2017	What She Put on the Table	植劇場—五味八珍的歲月	Lin Chun	
2017	Coming to Hengchun	若是來恆春	Lin Dui	Supporting Actress
2018	The Coming Through	奇蹟的女兒	Zhang Shu-Mei	Supporting Actress
2018	Befriend	人際關係事務所	Duan Duan	Supporting Actress
2018	My Goddess	種菜女神	Song Qiao Qi	Supporting Actress
2018	Park No.8	8號公園	Zhou Yi Ke	Supporting Actress
2018	Utopia For The 20s	20之後	Magazine cover female star	Cameo
2019	The Fearless	靈異街11號	Li Ning'er Li Qiaoer	Double role Supporting role
2019	Yong-Jiu Grocery Store	用九柑仔店	Young Lai Yu-yun	Cameo
2020	I, Myself	若是一個人	Fang Jia-ying	
2020	Adventure of the Ring	戒指流浪記	Hong Ya-wen	Supporting role
2021	Heaven on the 4th Floor	四樓的天堂	LETO	Supporting role
2021	Brave Animated Series	勇者動畫系列	Dragon Girl	Voice role
2022	LANG, Always by Your Side	浪我在你身邊	Nami	Supporting Role
2022	The Moon In The Cave	洞裡的月亮	Li Xin-yue	
2022	Dear Adam	親愛的亞當	Soho, Sookie	Dual role
2022	On Marriage: Wishful Syncing	你的婚姻不是你的婚姻 - 聖筊	Xie Ziya	
2023	Love Yourself	W劇場：沒有你依然燦爛	Kim Rokhee	Supporting role
2023	Living	有生之年	Hong Shishi	Supporting role
2024	The Accidental Influencer	何百芮的地獄毒白	Clara	Supporting role
2024	Born for the Spotlight	影后	Photograph	Cameo
2025	The Accidental Influencer: Love Me If You Dare	何百芮的地獄戀曲	Clara	Supporting Role
2025	Brave Animated Series 2	勇者動畫系列2	Dragon Brave	Voice role

=== Film ===
Year	English title	Original title	Role	Notes
2014	First Launch	七點半的太空人	Little Scissors Teacher	Voice role, Animated Short Film
2015	We Are Family	我們全家不太熟	Positive Energy Society Girls	Cameo
2016	My Eggy Boy	我的蛋男情人	26-year-old woman freezing her eggs	Cameo
2018	The Rope Curse	粽邪	Shen Qian-he	
2018	Sen Sen	生生	Ah Hui	Supporting role
2020	My Missing Valentine	消失的情人節	Little P	also Special Thanks
2020	The Silent Forrest	無聲	Schoolteacher	List Only
2020	Little Big Woman	孤味	Jia Jia	
2026	The Canary's Lullaby	我親愛的怪孩子		
