= The Receptionist =

- Theatrical release poster
- Directed by: Jenny Lu
- Written by: Jenny Lu; Yeh Yi-wen
- Produced by: Li Ya-mei; Jimmy Huang; Chiou Zi-ning; Peter J Kirby
- Starring: Teresa Daley; Chen Shiang-chyi
- Cinematography: Gareth Munden
- Edited by: Hoping Chen
- Music by: Luming Lu
- Production companies: Uncanny Films; Dark Horse Image
- Distributed by: Mirror Stage Films (Taiwan)
- Release dates: 20 November 2016 (Golden Horse Film Festival); 23 June 2017 (Taiwan)
- Running time: 100 minutes
- Countries: Taiwan; United Kingdom
- Languages: Mandarin; English; Taiwanese
- Budget: £300,000
- Box office: NT$3 million (Taiwan)

The Receptionist (Chinese: 接線員) is a 2016 drama film directed by London-based Taiwanese director Jenny Lu, starring Teresa Daley and Chen Shiang-chyi. Inspired by a true story, the film follows the lives of Asian migrant women who had arrived in London in hopes of a better life but end up taking jobs in an illegal massage parlor to survive. The film premiered at the Golden Horse Film Festival on 20 November 2016.

== Premise ==
Tina is a Taiwanese graduate living in London with her British student architect boyfriend. Struggling to find work during the 2008 financial crisis, Tina takes a job as a receptionist at an illegal massage parlour. As she slowly gets to know the women who work there, she is forced to question her values and morals.

== Cast ==
- Teresa Daley as Tina
- Chen Shiang-chyi as Sasa
- Amanda Fan as Mei
- Josh Whitehouse as Frank
- Sophie Gopsill as Lily
- Teng Shuang as Anna

== Production ==
The film received funding from Taiwan's Bureau of Audiovisual and Music Industry Development, as well as through a crowdfunding campaign on Kickstarter.

== Release ==
The film has been an official selection at the Edinburgh International Film Festival, the Raindance Film Festival, the Taipei Golden Horse Film Festival the Durban International Film Festival, the Milan and Salento Film Festivals and the 40th Asian American International Film Festival in New York City.

== Soundtrack ==
=== Promotional song ===
No.	Title	Writer(s)	Performer	Length
1.	"The Real World 真實世界"	Ball, Jie	Ball	04:19

== Reception ==
=== Critical response ===
The Receptionist has received an 88% rating on review aggregator website Rotten Tomatoes.

Peter Bradshaw of The Guardian lauded it as "a valuable, intelligent debut." Elizabeth Kerr in The Hollywood Reporter gave it a more mixed review.

=== Accolades ===
Award	Category	Recipients	Result
54th Golden Horse Awards	Best Supporting Actress	Chen Shiang-chyi	Nominated
Milan Film Festival	Best Feature Film	The Receptionist	Nominated
Salento Film Festival	Best Feature Film	The Receptionist	Nominated
40th AAIFF	Emerging Director Award	Jenny Lu	Won
