= Island Nation 2 =

Taiwanese television series

- Traditional Chinese: 國際橋牌社2
- Genre: Historical drama Political drama
- Directed by: Lin Shi-zhang, Lin Long-yin
- Starring: Yang Lie; Johnny Lu; Ricie Fun; Yang Lie; Mario Pu; Chen Jia-kui; An Jun-peng; Jacko Chiang; Tsai Tsan-te; Candy Yang; Patty Wu; Tang Chih-wei; Lin Tsai-pei; Joe Chang; Lin Yi-Fang; Joseph Hsia; Nishida Erina
- Theme music composer: Dongsjitsjang Letwan; Darryl Kuo
- Ending theme: Island Nation(Taiwanese Hokkien: 仝島一命, Chinese: 同島一命)
- Country of origin: Taiwan
- Original languages: Mandarin; Taiwanese Hokkien; English; Japanese; Eastern Min Matsu dialect Paiwan
- No. of episodes: 10

Production
- Executive producer: Xiong Jiu-shan
- Producer: Wang Yi-xin
- Production locations: Taiwan; Gaodeng Island, Lienchiang; Cornell University
- Running time: 60 min
- Production company: Marktwain Production

Original release
- Release: 10 September – 1 October 2021

Related
- Island Nation Spin-off: Hoping

Island Nation 2 (Chinese: 國際橋牌社2) is the second season of the Taiwanese political drama, Island Nation, based on Taiwan's transition from an authoritarian state to a democracy from 1994 to 1996. The second season debuted on September 12, 2021.

== Synopsis ==
Island Nation 2 presents a fictionalized account of Taiwan from 1995 to 1996 amidst Taiwan's arrival at its first-ever direct presidential election, featuring political infighting, rise of criminal elements in politics, and soldiers fighting for their lives under the Third Taiwan Strait Crisis. They all represent Taiwan's spirit of “One island, one destiny.”

== Episodes ==
| No. overall | No. in season | Title | Original release date |
|---|---|---|---|
| 11 | 1 | "Before the Storm" "Fēngbào Jiāng Lín" (Chinese: 風暴將臨) | September 12, 2021 |
The Baize Lake Incident in China claimed the lives of more than 20 Taiwanese and immediately forced President Li Ching-bo to suspend cross-strait exchanges. The Chinese authorities tried to cover up the incident by reporting it as an accident, which caused confusion as well as anger in Taiwan. Despite Chinese hindrance, BTV reporter Su Wan-chen was able to obtain exclusive photos of the incident through her own connections. Not satisfied with her contributions with Baize Lake, she volunteered to investigate a gang dispute in Yunlin, where she would meet the mysterious Chen Ching-tang, who somehow has the ability to influence everyone around him. Under a changing international space, Taiwan's unfair treatment by the US and the rise of gang-affiliated politicians will force the Taiwanese people and its President to go up against difficult decisions on their fight for democracy.
| 12 | 2 | "Against Headwinds" "Nìfēng Túwéi" (Chinese: 逆風突圍) | September 25, 2021 |
The Hawaii Incident and Li Ching-bo's diplomatic policy caused a diplomatic row with China, and the New National Party took the opportunity to attack Li. However, President Li is not one to back down, as he planned to make an official visit to the US with the help of Chu Shi-chen, Director of the Office of the President, and Chen Ching-tang, who wields considerable resources through his family. Domestically, Li Ching-bo publicly apologized to the families of the victims at the unveiling ceremony of the 228 Memorial. This became the topic on Wang Zhao-yang's political talk show, where New Nationalists tried to attack the apology, and Democrats tried to claim credit for it. Reporter Su Wan-chen actively reported on the 228 Incident, but unexpectedly brought back memories of another political event that his father experienced back then, the July 13 Incident in Penghu in 1949.
| 13 | 3 | "Eyeing the Prey" "Hǔshìdāndān" (Chinese: 虎視眈眈) | October 1, 2021 |
Chen Ching-tang uses his connections with the Cassidy Public Relations Company to make progress on President Li Ching-bo's visit to the United States. Meanwhile, the Hongtai Nylon factory closed without warning. When the workers protested and demanded that the factory owners come forward to resolve the salary issue, the Democratic Party joined in solidarity to boost their own image. At the same protest, Su Wan-chen's old friend from the university, Pan Tian-tang, reappears into her life. The factory owner asked the New National Party for help, which turned to Chen Ching-tang to suppress media reporting of the workers' protests. Su Wan-chen was stunned when she found out that Chen Ching-tang was behind this.
| 14 | 4 | "On the Frontlines" "Zhànhuǒ Qiánxiàn" (Chinese: 戰火前線) | October 1, 2021 |
Seeing Li Ching-bo's successful resolution of the factory shutdown incident, the New National Party angrily released the book, "The Warning of Taiwan Strait War". On the 2030 political talk show, the party spokesperson used this book to allege that Li Ching-bo's actions will lead Taiwan into war. With the help of the media, "The Warning of Taiwan Strait War" sparked a heated discussion among the public. Chu Shi-chen also discovered that large parts of the book seemed to be based on classified intel from the army. Therefore, Cheng Chi-fu, Deputy Secretary General of the National Security Council, suggested that the President inspect the front lines to calm the military. On the other hand, Pan Tian-tang never expected to get sent to the front line Gordon Island in Matsu. He would experience frequent military alerts under extremely difficult living conditions.
| 15 | 5 | "What the People Desire" "Mín Zhī Suǒ Yú" (Chinese: 民之所欲) | October 1, 2021 |
Li Ching-bo's visit to Cornell came true with Chen Ching-tang's assistance. In the face of joint pressure from China and the United States, the President made plans on how he will approach his speech. Su Wan-chen was on site for the Cornell speech because of Chen Ching-tang's help. However, although President Li Ching-bo's speech "What the People Want is Always in My Heart", won accolades from the audience, it has also angered the United States and China, who believes that this off-draft performance has no integrity. This set off an international chain of events that threaten to upset the peace in Taiwan Strait.
| 16 | 6 | "Battle of Faith" "Wèihé ér Zhàn" (Chinese: 為何而戰) | October 1, 2021 |
Li Ching-bo's speech immediately triggered a military response and protest from China. Taiwan's stock market plummeted and people rushed to the bank to withdraw their savings. In addition, under the recommendation of Chen Chung-hsuan, Huang Hai-bo and Chu Chang-ching split from Li Ching-bo's National Party to run as the presidential candidate pair for the New National Party. To counter them, the Director of the Office of the President Chu Shi-chen chose to rely on nominating gang-affiliated local politicians for the upcoming legislative election. Meanwhile, Chen Ching-tang launched the top-secret "Zhishan Task Force," combining with US and Japanese officials for tripartite intelligence exchange. At the same time, Pan Tian-tang received an intruder alert on the front line of Gordon Island, and the whole island is immediately raised to the highest alert level.
| 17 | 7 | "Devil's Advocate" "Wèihǔ Zuò Chāng" (Chinese: 為虎作倀) | October 1, 2021 |
A local newspaper broke the news that the National Party had nominated candidates with criminal backgrounds. After the news broke, the news agency was violently destroyed by unknown persons. Reporter Su Wan-chen immediately rushed to Yunlin to conduct an in-depth investigation. When Su's Father found that he was unable to contact his daughter for several days, he reached out to Chen Ching-tang to rescue her from Yunlin. At the same time, the Democratic Party and the New National Party viciously attacked the black gold politics of the National Party on Wang Zhao-yang's talk show, forcing the National Party’s Minister of Justice Yeh Jiu-sheng to hold a press conference and commit to strictly enforcing the law. At the other end, Chen Chung-hsuan instructed Chen Ching-ji, the younger brother of the Chen family, to safeguard family interests by helping out the opposition parties and playing both sides.
| 18 | 8 | "Fallen into Quagmire" "Shēn Xiàn Nínào" (Chinese: 深陷泥淖) | October 1, 2021 |
Su Wan-chen was taken forcibly to dinner with Chou Ding-rong, but Chen Ching-tang was able to arrive in time to prevent any harm from happening to her. When Chen asked Su to be more careful next time, she responded firmly, "It is a reporter's duty to not fear power." As it turns out, she was right to press the issue, because the Ministry of Justice finally brought Chou in after the public started to become restless over his increasing disregard for the law. Meanwhile, Chen Ching-tang's younger brother, Chen Ching-ji, tries to increase New National Party's exposure by hosting a dinner with their party members and BTV reporters.
| 19 | 9 | "Vow to Believe" "Xìnniàn Zhī Shì" (Chinese: 信念之誓) | October 1, 2021 |
As the presidential election is approaching, the CCP once again tried to affect the election with missiles, and a loud explosion on Gordon Island caused the troops to rush to guard their island. The turbulent situation forced the United States, Taiwan, and Japan to quickly convene a meeting of the "Zhishan Task Force". In order to improve the morale of the people, President Li Ching-bo asked the National Security Bureau to declare to the United States that Taiwan's military will protect the country at all costs. As the commander-in-chief, he closely monitored the trajectory of the missiles and announced that they did not contain live warheads and that the public did not need to panic. At the same time, Chu Shi-chen asked Chen Ching-tang to act as a spy and to conduct political espionage in China. However, in order to do so, Chen had to violate his family's interest, which caused his father to disown him. When he left, he went to Su Wan-chen and told her his final farewell.
| 20 | 10 | "One Island One Destiny" "Tòngdǎo Yī Mìng" (Chinese: 同島一命) | October 1, 2021 |
Chen Ching-tang was surrounded by the police after obtaining the information. Seeing that there was no possibility of escape, he decided to create an explosion but killed himself in the process. In addition, armed helicopters launched by the CCP started showing up near Gordon just as Taiwan is approaching its first direct presidential election. Su Wan-chen made the short documentary, "One Island One Destiny - Island Nation" to cover what is at stake for the fate of the Taiwanese in this election. People overwhelmingly participated and cast their historic votes while the soldiers on Gordon defend and hold off enemy forces on the front line. The troops held themselves to the ideals of "one island one destiny, seek life in death," by fighting to the very end to preserve everyday life in the country.
