= Luming Lu =

Taiwanese film score composer (born 1982)

- 盧律銘
- Born: Lu Lu-ming; 23 June 1982 (age 43); Pingtung City, Taiwan
- Education: I-Shou University (BS); Kingston University (MMus)
- Occupation: Composer
- Family: Jenny Lu (sister)

Lu Lu-ming (Chinese: 盧律銘; pinyin: Lú Lǜmíng; born 23 June 1982), also known as Luming Lu, is a Taiwanese film score composer. He won Best Original Film Song with the horror film Detention (2019) in the 56th Golden Horse Awards and Best Original Film Score with the drama film The Falls (2021) in the 58th Golden Horse Awards.

== Early life ==
Lu was born on 23 June 1982 in Pingtung City, Taiwan. His father Lu Yong-hui was a lawyer and a member of the Pingtung Mediation Committee. He learnt to play the piano and violin at a young age. He considered himself deviant and rebellious during his school years and joined the rock music club. Inspired by Thom Yorke's album The Eraser, he began writing music. Due to his aptitude for mathematics in high school, he decided to study applied mathematics at I-Shou University after graduation. During his university years, he formed a band with his friends and devoted most of his time to music. After obtaining a Bachelor of Science, he fulfilled his mandatory military service and worked as a math tutor at a cram school. However, he did not enjoy his job and longed to pursue a career in music. Jenny Lu, his elder sister and a film director based in London, encouraged him to write music for films. He subsequently moved to the United Kingdom and enrolled at Kingston University to study film score composing, based on the recommendation of his sister and parents. He graduated with a Master of Music in Composing for Film and Television.

== Career ==
After graduation, Lu returned to Taiwan in 2010. He faced difficulties in finding job opportunities as a film composer and shifted his focus to writing music for pop singers instead, including Peggy Hsu's "A Letter to Mr. Tim Burton", which earned him a nomination for Best Instrumental Composer in the 27th Golden Melody Awards. He had also formed a band called Empty Space On a Chessboard, and won the Golden Indie Music Awards twice with albums Quarrel and innerSpacel he wrote for the band.

In 2016, he received his first film composing role in his sister's drama film The Receptionist. The following year, he composed for the mystery thriller film Xiao Mei, earning nominations for Best Original Film Song and Best Original Film Score at the 55th Golden Horse Awards. In 2019, Lu composed for John Hsu's horror film Detention, showcasing his unique style of absurd vibes, and received widespread acclaim for his work. He won Best Original Film Song at the 56th Golden Horse Awards and received nominations for Best Original Film Score and Best Music at both the aforementioned Golden Horse Awards and the 2020 Taipei Film Awards. He also became a frequent collaborator of Hsu. In 2020, he composed for the drama film The Silent Forest and the romantic comedy film A Leg. For The Silent Forest, he employed low-key and environmental noises in the film score, removing loud background music to better suit the movie's atmosphere. In A Leg, he used bass, double bass, and xylophone to create a sense of absurdity. The former earned him a nomination for Best Original Film Score at the 57th Golden Horse Awards and he won Best Music at the 2021 Taipei Film Awards with the latter.

In 2021, Lu composed for the drama film The Falls, using banjo to evoke a sense of simplicity in the music, which earned him Best Original Film Score at the 58th Golden Horse Awards. Lu also composed "Rong Xue" for Faye in 2022 and received a nomination for Best Single Producer of the Year in the 33rd Golden Melody Awards. In 2023, he composed for the medical thriller film Eye of the Storm and the action thriller film The Pig, the Snake and the Pigeon, receiving two nominations for Best Original Film Score at the 60th Golden Horse Awards. He was also invited to chair the jury for the Golden Indie Music Awards in the same year. Lu also composed for the horror comedy film Dead Talents Society, and received two nominations for Best Score for a Drama Series in the 59th Golden Bell Awards for his works on Port of Lies and Not a Murder Story in the following year, winning with Port of Lies.

== Personal life ==
Lu is married and had a daughter during the production of Detention.

In 2019, Lu voiced support for the 2019–2020 Hong Kong protests on the 56th Golden Horse Awards ceremony and dedicated his award to the Hong Kongese protestors. He also made a public appeal for people to vote against the four propositions in the 2021 Taiwanese referendum.

== Discography ==
=== Film ===
Year	Title	Notes
2016	The Receptionist	
2017	Xiao Mei	
2019	Detention	
2019	The Good Daughter	Documentary
2020	My Missing Valentine	
2020	A Leg	
2020	The Silent Forest	
2021	The Falls	
2021	The Soul	
2022	Untold Herstory	
2023	Eye of the Storm	
2023	The Pig, the Snake and the Pigeon	
2023	A Boy and A Girl	
2024	Dead Talents Society	

=== Television ===
Year	Title	Notes
2016	Close Your Eyes Before It's Dark	
2021	Heaven on the 4th Floor	
2023	Port of Lies	
2024	Not a Murder Story	

== Awards and nominations ==
Year	Award	Category	Work	Result	Ref.
2017	52nd Golden Bell Awards	Best Sound	Close Your Eyes Before It's Dark	Won	
2018	55th Golden Horse Awards	Best Original Film Song	Xiao Mei	Nominated	
2018	55th Golden Horse Awards	Best Original Film Score	Xiao Mei	Nominated	
2018	30th Golden Melody Awards	Best Instrumental Album Producer	Xiao Mei	Nominated	
2019	56th Golden Horse Awards	Best Original Film Song	Detention	Won	
2019	56th Golden Horse Awards	Best Original Film Score	Detention	Nominated	
2019	2020 Taipei Film Awards	Best Music	Detention	Nominated	
2020	57th Golden Horse Awards	Best Original Film Song	My Missing Valentine	Nominated	
2020	57th Golden Horse Awards	Best Original Film Score	The Silent Forest	Nominated	
2020	2021 Taipei Film Awards	Best Music	The Silent Forest	Nominated	
2020	2021 Taipei Film Awards	Best Music	A Leg	Won	
2021	58th Golden Horse Awards	Best Original Film Score	The Falls	Won	
2023	2023 Taipei Film Awards	Best Music	Eye of the Storm	Nominated	
2023	60th Golden Horse Awards	Best Original Film Score	Eye of the Storm	Nominated	
2023	60th Golden Horse Awards	Best Original Film Score	The Pig, the Snake and the Pigeon	Nominated	
2024	59th Golden Bell Awards	Best Score for a Drama Series	Port of Lies	Won	
2024	59th Golden Bell Awards	Best Score for a Drama Series	Not a Murder Story	Nominated	
