= Island Nation =

Taiwanese television series

- Chinese: 國際橋牌社
- Hanyu Pinyin: Guójì Qiáopái Shè
- Tâi-lô: Kok‑tsè Kiâu-pâi Siā
- Genre: Historical drama Political drama
- Directed by: Wang Yi-xin, Lin Shi-zhang, Sun Da-jun, Lin Long-yin
- Starring: Akira Chen; Chia-Kuei Chen; Chen Yu; Hsia Teng-hung; Kurt Chou; Johnny Lu; Ricie Fun; Yang Lie; Mario Pu; Chen Jia-kui; An Jun-peng; Akio Chen
- Theme music composer: Fire EX.
- Opening theme: Stand Up Like A Taiwanese(Chinese: 無名英雄)
- Country of origin: Taiwan
- Original languages: Mandarin; Taiwanese Hokkien; English; Japanese; Korean; Eastern Min Matsu dialect
- No. of series: 2
- No. of episodes: 20

Production
- Producers: Wang Yi-xin, Xiong Jiu-shan
- Production locations: Taiwan; Keelung, Taipei, New Taipei, Taoyuan, Pingtung, Yilan
- Production company: Marktwain Production

Original release
- Network: Far EasTone; Public Television Service; Line TV
- Release: 20 January 2020

Related
- Island Nation Spin-off: Hoping

Island Nation (Chinese: 國際橋牌社) is a Taiwanese political drama based on Taiwan's transition from an authoritarian state to a democracy in the 1990s. The season 1 covered the history from 1990 to 1994. The series will include 80 episodes over 8 seasons, with the first season premiering on January 20, 2020. The second season, Island Nation 2, debuted on September 12, 2021.

== Episodes ==
Season	Episodes	Originally released	
Season	Episodes	First released	Last released
1	10	January 20, 2020	January 20, 2020
2	10	September 12, 2021	October 1, 2021

== Production ==
US$2.46 million was spent on the first season, with the Ministry of Culture subsidizing US$0.98 million in production costs. A replica of the Presidential Office Building was built at a Republic of China Navy base in Taoyuan, while the presidential inauguration scene was filmed in the building itself.

Casting was a challenge, as several local actors and actresses declined roles in the series, for fear of compromising their ability to work in China.

== Critical reception ==
Cinema Escapist described Island Nation as "one of the most compelling series in Taiwanese entertainment history thus far", noting the contrast to the apolitical stance and self-censorship undertaken by many Taiwanese entertainers in order to access China's media market. The second season of the series was promoted by Taiwanese president Tsai Ing-wen on an Instagram post.

== Adaption ==
Be adapted into board game Island Nation(board game).
