= Jenny Lu =

Taiwanese filmmaker and scholar

- 盧謹明
- Born: Lu Jin-ming; Pingtung City, Taiwan
- Education: Nottingham Trent University (BA); University of the Arts London (MA, PhD)
- Occupation: Filmmaker
- Years active: 2009–present
- Family: Luming Lu (brother)

Jenny Lu Jin-ming (Chinese: 盧謹明) is a Taiwanese filmmaker and scholar best known for her feature film debut The Receptionist (2016). She is currently an assistant professor at I-Shou University.

== Early life and education ==
Lu was born in Pingtung City, Taiwan. She has a younger brother, Luming Lu, who later became a film score composer and wrote music for her debut film. Inspired by Darren Aronofsky, she developed a passion for films when she was young and often dreamt of working on production sets. Lu later attended the art class at National Pingtung Senior High School and went on an exchange to the United States during her second year of high school. After the experience, she was determined to study abroad and enrolled at Nottingham Trent University to pursue a degree in contemporary arts after completing secondary school. She won a Beck's Futures prize with a short film she produced during university years. Upon graduating with a Bachelor of Arts, Lu began working as an assistant director in the United Kingdom in 2004 and produced several short films since 2009. She also acquired a Master of Arts and a Doctor of Philosophy in arts at University of the Arts London in 2008. In 2014, she directed and wrote short film The Man Who Walked on the Moon, which won a special award at the International Documentary Film Festival Amsterdam.

== Career ==
In 2016, Lu directed and wrote her first feature film, The Receptionist, which was co-produced in Taiwan and the United Kingdom. The film tells the story of a Taiwanese immigrant and arts school graduate who, desperate to make a living, is forced to take up a job as a receptionist for a brothel. The film received positive acclaim, and Lu won the Emerging Director Award at the 40th Asian American International Film Festival. Lu was invited to co-host the 5th Pingtung Film Festival in 2020. The following year, she returned to Taiwan and worked as an assistant professor at the Department of Film and Television of I-Shou University.

== Filmography ==
Year	Title	Director	Writer	Notes
2016	The Receptionist	Yes	Yes	

== Awards and nominations ==
Year	Award	Category	Work	Result	Ref.
2017	40th Asian American International Film Festival	Emerging Director Award	The Receptionist	Won	
