= Untold Herstory =

- 流麻溝十五號
- Directed by: Zero Chou
- Based on: 《流麻沟十五号：绿岛女子分队及其他》 by Cao Qinrong (曹钦荣)
- Produced by: Pasuya Yao
- Music by: Luming Lu
- Release date: 28 October 2022
- Running time: 113 minutes
- Country: Taiwan
- Languages: Mandarin; Taiwanese Hokkien; Japanese; Shandong Mandarin; Hakka; Cantonese; English

Untold Herstory
- Traditional Chinese: 流麻溝十五號
- Simplified Chinese: 流麻沟十五号
Transcriptions
Standard Mandarin
- Hanyu Pinyin: Liú má gōu shíwǔ hào
Southern Min
- Hokkien POJ: Lô͘-môa kau cha̍p-gō͘ hō

Untold Herstory (Chinese: 流麻溝十五號; pinyin: Liú má gōu shíwǔ hào; Pe̍h-ōe-jī: Lô͘-môa kau cha̍p-gō͘ hō) is a 2022 Taiwanese historical film by Zero Chou, about the detention of female political prisoners in the 1950s in Ludao Prison, in the beginning of the White Terror and the martial law. It has been produced by Pasuya Yao. The BAMID helped with financial contributions. It's based on historical facts, the Green Island Prison Organization Case.

== Cast ==
- Yu Pei-Jen (余佩真) as 余杏惠
- Cindy Lien (連俞涵) as 陳萍
- Herb Hsu (徐麗雯) as 嚴水霞
- Jason Tauh (徐韜) as 林耀輝
- Sou Gaku (莊岳) as 莊正雄
- Yang Ta-cheng (楊大正) as 王醫生
- Angel Lee (李雪) as 羅幹事
- Joanne Yang (楊蕎安) as 廖素琴
- Ray Yang (楊鎮) as 王銘
- Mario Pu (馬力歐) as 大隊長
- Yi-Feng Chiu (邱逸峰) as 戴少校
- 鄧筠熹 as 黃蔡昭娣
- 林冬 (daughter of Nolay Piho) as 洪瑪雅
- 蕭涵方 as 小吳幹事
- Mars Ma (馬俊麟) as 軍官
- 盧子文 as 蔣介石
- Quro Tsai (蔡哲文) as 莊有福
