= Collage (Taiwanese duo) =

Taiwanese music duo

- 珂拉琪
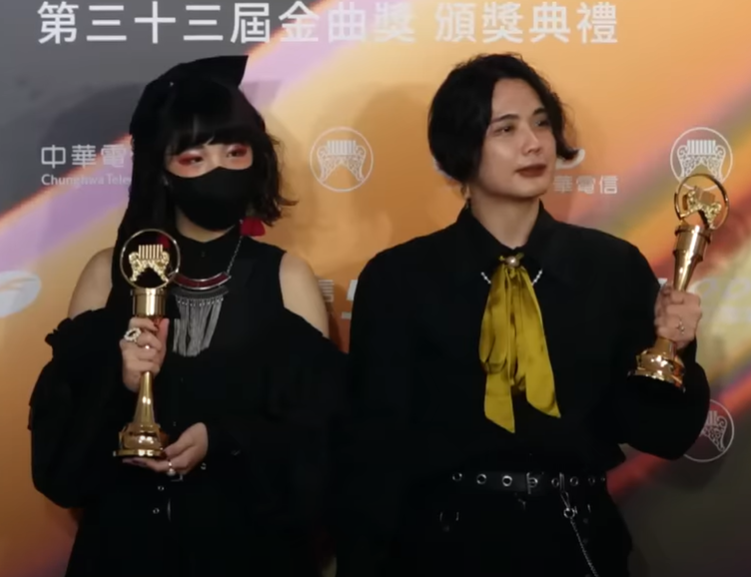
- Lariyod (left) and Wang (right) at the 33rd Golden Melody Awards, 2022
- Musical career
- Origin: Taiwan
- Genres: Indie; Pop; Folk rock; Heavy metal; Electronic music; Rhythm and blues; New Taiwanese Song; Taiwanese indigenous music
- Members: Natsuko Lariyod（夏子·拉里又斯）; Hunter Wang（王家權）
- Website: Collage on StreetVoice

Collage (pinyin: Kēlāqí; Japanese: コラジ) is a Taiwanese band that released their first album in 2021, with two members: lead singer Natsuko Lariyod, who is of mixed Hakka and Amis ancestry, and Hunter Wang, who is of Minnan descent. Rather than use Taiwanese Mandarin, the band focuses on producing music using Taiwanese, Japanese, Amis and English. They incorporate indigenous people's music into their compositions.

== Members ==
=== Natsuko Lariyod ===
Natsuko Lariyod (Chinese: 夏子·拉里又斯; pinyin: Xiàzǐ Lālǐyòusī) is a musician of mixed Hakka and Amis ancestry. She has a brother who is two years older than her. She attended Taoyuan Municipal Wu-Ling Senior High School in Taoyuan, Taiwan, and later studied at the National Taipei University's Department of Art and Design, where she wrote her thesis on Taiwanese indigenous culture. In addition to her musical talents, Lariyod also creates her own illustrations for the band's album covers.

=== Hunter Wang ===
Hunter Wang (Chinese: 王家權; Pe̍h-ōe-jī: Ông Ka-koân) is a Taiwanese musician who first studied at the National Taiwan Normal University's Department of Civic Education and Leadership, before switching to the National Chengchi University's Department of Business Administration. He spent a total of seven years at university before deciding to focus on his musical career. Wang was exposed to music since young by his elder brother and learned to play the guitar. Wang subsequently joined Chenggong High School's Guitar Club as a bassist and a singer.

He was in a car accident which led him to change his perspective on life. At about the same time, his relationship with his parents grew more distant, in part due to their different opinions on Taiwanese politics.

In university, Wang joined another band called Human Remake (人造人類), which was later disbanded, which is also why he could only participate in non-live competitions, such as ChthoniC's rearrangement contest (Chinese: 天下第一閃靈改造大會; pinyin: Tiānxià Dì Yī Shǎnlíng Gǎizào Dàhuì).

== Career ==
The two members first collaborated in 2018 and with a song that won the "19+" category of a music rearrangement contest for covering music of the Taiwanese band ChthoniC.

In 2019, they officially established the band under the name Collage, referring to the collage of the different styles of music and languages that come together in their songs. They started releasing their songs on YouTube and the Taiwanese music streaming website StreetVoice.

In 2022, the band won the award for best new artist in the 33rd Golden Melody Awards.

In 2023, the band collaborated with ChthoniC and performed One Thousand Eyes and Defenders of Bú-Tik Palace in the Megaport Festival 2023.

In 2024, the band performed the theme song for the Taiwanese videogame Nine Sols.

== Discography ==
=== Album ===
Title	Year	Track listing
MEmento·MORI	2021	1. "這該死的拘執佮愛（Album ver.）" – 3:55; 2. "葬予規路火烌猶在（Album ver.）" – 4:13; 3. "萬千花蕊慈母悲哀（Album ver.）" – 3:56; 4. "傷心地獄芳花引魂" – 4:02; 5. "MALIYANG（Album ver.）" – 3:17; 6. "TALACOWA" – 3:52; 7. "ADINGO" – 4:12; 8. "TORATORAW" – 3:17; 9. "Outro" – 2:39
Deus Ex Machina	2024	1. "徒花水月 Adabana (Ode to Impermanence)" – 4:06; 2. "蓮花空行 Lotus Dakini in Ascension" – 3:51; 3. "紅弁慶 Beni Benkei" – 4:03; 4. "血母荫身 Astray in Crimson Bardo" – 4:31; 5. "3月桃花 March Ablaze with Raging Peaches" – 3:13; 6. "空華亂墜 Petaled Phantasmagoria" – 3:12; 7. "謀殺石蓮 Murder the Echeveria" – 3:41; 8. "鏨頭長命 Long May You Live, Off with Your Head" – 2:47; 9. "千屈菜 Awry the Loosestrife" – 3:07; 10. "極樂金花 Mandalas Rain for Thee" – 3:26; 11. "機械降神 Deus Ex Machina" – 3:20

=== Singles ===
Year	Track title
2019	"閃靈／合掌 Arranged Cover"
2019	"這該死的拘執佮愛"
2019	"TIC"
2019	"Radical Love"
2020	"葬予規路火烌猶在"
2020	"MALIYANG"
2020	"萬千花蕊慈母悲哀"
2020	"紅弁慶（ベニベンケイ）"
2021	"蓮花空行身染愛"
2024	血母蔭身
2024	3月桃花
2024	蓮花空行
2024	紅弁慶
2024	空華亂墜
2024	謀殺石蓮

== Awards and accolades ==
Year	Ceremony	Award	Work	Result	Ref
2022	33rd Golden Melody Awards	Best New Artist	MEmento·MORI	Won	
2022	Golden Indie Music Awards	Jury award	MEmento·MORI	Won	
2022	第25届中华音乐人交流协会	Top 10 most popular songs of the year	万千花蕊慈母悲哀	Placed	
