= Detention (Taiwanese TV series) =

2020 Taiwanese horror TV series

- Traditional Chinese: 返校
- Genre: Horror; Supernatural; Thriller
- Based on: Detention video game
- Directed by: I-Hsuan Su; Shiang-An Chuang; Yi Liu
- Starring: Ling-Wei Lee; Ning Han
- Country of origin: Taiwan
- Original languages: Taiwanese Hokkien; Mandarin
- No. of seasons: 1
- No. of episodes: 8

Production
- Producers: Shih-Ken Lin; I-Ling Lin
- Editor: Chiang Yi-ning
- Running time: 60 minutes
- Production company: Outland Film Production

Original release
- Network: (PTS)
- Release: 5 December – 26 December 2020

Related
- Detention (2019 film)

Detention (Chinese: 返校; pinyin: Fǎnxiào) is a Taiwanese supernatural horror drama television series, created for Netflix in collaboration with Public Television Service, based on the video game of the same name developed by Red Candle Games. It premiered on 5 December 2020.

== Plot ==
Based on the game set in the period of martial law known as the White Terror in Taiwan, Detention entwines the suffocating political situations under martial law and heart-stopping legends of local deities, portraying a labyrinth of unspeakable oppressions.

The series opens at Greenwood High School in 1999. Transfer student Yunxiang Liu (Lingwei Lee) enters a forbidden area of the school grounds, where she encounters the ghost of Ray-Xin Fang (Ning Han). Fang reveals the hidden history of the school over the past 30 years, including how a group of students and teachers were persecuted as they fought for freedom in the era of censorship.

== Cast ==
- Ling-Wei Lee (李玲葦) as Yunxiang Liu
- Ning Han (韓寧) as Ray-Xin Fang
- Guang-Zhi Huan (黃冠志) as Wen-Liang Cheng
- Yao Chun-yao
- Hsia Teng-hung as Chang Ming-hui
- David Chao

== Episodes ==
No.	Title	Directed by	Written by	Original release date
1	"Devil"	I Hsuan Su, Chaung Shiang An, Yi Liu	Unknown	5 December 2020
2	"Who am I?"	I Hsuan Su, Chaung Shiang An, Yi Liu	Unknown	5 December 2020
3	"You are me, I am you"	I Hsuan Su, Chaung Shiang An, Yi Liu	Unknown	12 December 2020
4	"Falsehood"	I Hsuan Su, Chaung Shiang An, Yi Liu	Unknown	12 December 2020
5	"HIStory repeats"	I Hsuan Su, Chaung Shiang An, Yi Liu	Unknown	19 December 2020
6	"Re: Detention"	I Hsuan Su, Chaung Shiang An, Yi Liu	Unknown	19 December 2020
7	"Re: Re: Detention"	I Hsuan Su, Chaung Shiang An, Yi Liu	Unknown	26 December 2020
8	"Rain of Freedom"	I Hsuan Su, Chaung Shiang An, Yi Liu	Unknown	26 December 2020

== Release ==
The eight-episode series premiered on 5 December 2020, 21:00 National Standard Time, with one new episode being released each Saturday. The series is an addition to Netflix's Chinese Language Originals collection.
