= Detention (2019 film) =

2019 Taiwanese psychological horror film

- Taiwanese theatrical release poster
- Traditional Chinese: 返校
- Hanyu Pinyin: Fǎn Xiào
- Directed by: John Hsu
- Written by: John Hsu; Fu Kai-ling; Chien Shih-keng
- Based on: Detention by Red Candle Games
- Produced by: Lee Lieh; Lee Yao-hua
- Starring: Gingle Wang; Fu Meng-po; Tseng Ching-hua; Cecilia Choi; Chu Hung-chang
- Cinematography: Patrick Chou
- Edited by: Shieh Meng-ju
- Music by: Luming Lu
- Production companies: 1 Production Film Co.; Filmagic Pictures
- Distributed by: Warner Bros. Taiwan
- Release date: 20 September 2019
- Running time: 105 minutes
- Country: Taiwan
- Language: Mandarin
- Budget: NT$95 million (US$3 million)
- Box office: US$10.1 million

Detention (Chinese: 返校) is a 2019 Taiwanese supernatural psychological horror film directed by John Hsu and based on the popular horror video game of same name developed by Red Candle Games. Set in 1962 during Taiwan's White Terror period, two students are trapped at their hillside high school at night. While trying to escape and find their missing teacher, they encounter ghosts and the dark truth of their fate.

The film was not released in mainland China due to a ban, but enjoyed strong box office success in Taiwan, Hong Kong, Singapore, Malaysia, Indonesia, and South Korea; the film was also selected in the official section of the 2020 International Film Festival Rotterdam.

A TV series of the same name aired in 2020 on PTS and Netflix. The TV series is also based on the video game, but features a different story from the film.

== Plot ==
In 1960's Taiwan, during the White Terror, high school student Wei Chung-ting is a member of a secret book club, headed by teacher Miss Yin Tsui Han, that reads and studies books banned by the government; the possession of which is heavily penalized. Sometime later, the book club's activities are discovered and Wei is among those arrested and is tortured for information. After hours of interrogation, Wei, barely alive, enters a nightmarish version of the school that is seemingly abandoned with most of the rooms boarded up with placards of mourning.

Wei encounters Fang Ray Shin, a fellow student who does not recall how she got there. They discover they are trapped in the school when they find that the bridge has apparently fallen into the flooded river. They decide to find Mr. Chang Ming Hui, another teacher whom Ray saw wandering the building. On the way, they nearly encounter a monstrous ghost resembling a military officer carrying a lantern that stalks the grounds. While searching the school, Wei encounters another book club member who is burning notes and copies of the banned books. He explains to Wei that someone ratted them out before he is attacked by the Lantern Ghost.

Finding the book club at a bomb shelter on school grounds, the other members and Miss Yin turn on Ray and accuse her of being the rat. When Wei asks what they mean by this, Ray flees.

The story is intercut with flash-backs and reveals that Ray, though a bright student, had a difficult home life. She subsequently found comfort in and entered a romantic relationship with Mr. Chang, who was also deeply involved with the book club. Miss Yin confronted Mr. Chang about the relationship and urged him to break it off, considering that it would harm the book club. However, Ray overheard their conversation and mistakenly concluded that Yin and Chang were themselves in a relationship.

Inspired by how her mother framed her abusive and philandering father and got him arrested; Ray planned to get rid of Miss Yin. She exploited Wei's crush on her and convinced him to let her borrow a copy of one of the club's books. Ray then handed the contraband over to Inspector Bai, hoping that Yin would be dismissed. However, Chang and the book club members were arrested along with Yin. In the auditorium, Wei sees the other book club members have been strung up and executed; and is captured by the school's military inspector Bai. Ray appears and slits Wei's throat before shooting Yin with Bai's gun. Much to her horror and sorrow, Ray witnesses Chang's execution. She is then accosted by the school's students, who call her a murderer. Ray then recalls that she killed herself out of guilt after the book club's arrest; and that she has been trapped in a hellish, cyclic purgatory, repressing her memories and refusing to acknowledge her wrongdoings. Chang's spirit appears to Ray and tells her to save Wei so that one of them can live on and remember.

Ray rescues Wei (now unharmed); but is caught by the Lantern Ghost. Bai tempts Ray to repress her memories again and continue denying her guilt. Ray refuses to do so any longer, and the Lantern Ghost shatters to pieces. Ray and Wei run to the school's gate as shadows overtake the building. Ray helps him climb over and urges him to live on while she remains behind. Wei escapes and awakens back in prison. He confesses to his crimes and opens himself to any punishment, provided that he be allowed to live.

Years later, a middle-aged Wei visits now-closed and soon to be demolished school. Following Chang's last wish, he locates a hidden copy of one of the banned books. In one of the empty classrooms, he presents the book to Ray's ghost. In it, she finds a jade deer pendant Chang had given her, as well as a last, loving letter wherein Chang promises to meet her in the next life.

== Themes ==
There are some easter eggs related to the dictatorship. Fang Ray Shin's student ID in the game is "5350126," but in the film, it has been changed to "493856," symbolizing the commemoration of martial law in Taiwan in 1949, lasting for 38 years and 56 days. Wei Chung-ting's student ID "501014" commemorates the death anniversary of Zhōng Hàodōng, former principal of National Keelung Senior High School. As a member of the Chinese Communist Party, Zhōng Hàodōng organized the Guangming Daily (Guāngmíng Rìbào) and advocated overthrowing the regime that caused the 228 incident. He was arrested by the Chiang Kai-shek dictatorship and executed by firing squad on October 14, 1950, in the town of Machang.

== Cast ==
- Gingle Wang as Fang Ray-shin
- Fu Meng-po as Mr. Chang Ming-hui
- Tseng Ching-hua as Wei Chung-ting
- Cecilia Choi as Miss Yin Tsui-han
- Hung Chang Chu as Inspector Bai
- Hsia Ching-ting as Fang's father
- Jessie Chang as Fang's mother
- Moon Lee as Chou Hsin

== Production ==
The film production rights were purchased on 21 June 2017 from Red Candle Games by 1 Production Film Co. The first film trailer was released on 19 June 2019. The film's budget was roughly NT$95,000,000 (US$3,065,000). The story and game are inspired by true events, specifically the 1947 Keelung Senior High School incident. A portion of the film production took place in Kaohsiung. The film score featured a live orchestra of forty instrumentalists.

== Reception ==
=== Critical response ===
On the review aggregator website Rotten Tomatoes, 86% of 43 critics' reviews are positive, with an average rating of 7/10. The website's consensus reads: "Politically charged horror that's as viscerally effective as it is intellectually stimulating, Detention's got class." Metacritic, which uses a weighted average, assigned the film a score of 67 out of 100, based on 4 critics, indicating "generally favorable" reviews. A review in the Taipei Times described the film as "likeable...chilling but not downright terrifying." Compared to the video game, Han Cheung opined that the film felt "simplified" and that it overemphasized its White Terror setting without focusing on the political background of the period. Director John Hsu stated that the film drew a younger audience than he expected. A review in Variety described the film as generally absorbing and entertaining, but noted problems with the narrative, pointing to 'a whiff of sexism in the treatment of naive, jealous schoolgirl Fang, while the underlying ickiness of the teacher-student love affair goes largely unmentioned'.

Following a boycott of the 56th Golden Horse Awards by Chinese filmmakers, Detention received twelve award nominations, the most of any film that year. However, due to the sensitive plot of the story, the film is banned in China, and mention of the film is scrubbed from all mainland Chinese websites. The film is referred to as "xx" in Chinese media's Golden Horse nomination reports. In Hong Kong, the release date was pushed back to December in order to avoid association with the Hong Kong protests happening simultaneously. The film received limited theatrical release on 5 December 2019 in Hong Kong.

=== Box office ===
Detention made NT$67.7 million three days after its premiere in Taiwan, becoming the third-highest take of first three-day gross for domestic film, behind the two-part film Warriors of the Rainbow: Seediq Bale (2011). It is the highest-grossing domestic film of 2019 in Taiwan; it also became one of the top five highest-grossing local films in Taiwan in the last decade. It grossed NT$259,599,005 in Taiwan by December 2019, and a total of NT$260,000,000 (US$8,415,000) in Taiwan as of January 2020.

The film grossed more than HK$11,052,322 at Hong Kong box office, which was a very successful result for a limited theatrical release film. The film grossed US$1,687,554 in Hong Kong and South Korea, for a total of US$10,102,554 grossed in East Asia.

=== Awards and nominations ===
Year	Awards ceremony	Category	Nominee	Result	Ref.
2019	56th Golden Horse Awards	Best New Director	John Hsu	Won	
2019	56th Golden Horse Awards	Best Adapted Screenplay	John Hsu, Fu Kai-ling, Chien Shih-keng	Won	
2019	56th Golden Horse Awards	Best Visual Effects	Renovatio Pictures, Tomi Kuo	Won	
2019	56th Golden Horse Awards	Best Art Direction	Wang Chih-cheng	Won	
2019	56th Golden Horse Awards	Best Original Film Song	"The Day After Rain"	Won	
2019	56th Golden Horse Awards	Best Feature Film	Detention	Nominated	
2019	56th Golden Horse Awards	Best Leading Actress	Gingle Wang	Nominated	
2019	56th Golden Horse Awards	Best New Performer	Tseng Ching-hua	Nominated	
2019	56th Golden Horse Awards	Best Action Choreography	Jimmy Hung	Nominated	
2019	56th Golden Horse Awards	Best Film Editing	Shieh Meng-ju	Nominated	
2019	56th Golden Horse Awards	Best Sound Effects	Dennis Tsao, Book Chien	Nominated	
2019	56th Golden Horse Awards	Best Original Film Score	Luming Lu	Nominated	
2020	39th Hong Kong Film Awards	Best Film from Mainland and Taiwan	Detention	Nominated	
2020	2020 Fantasporto	Special Award - Orient Express Section	Detention	Won	
2020	2020 Taipei Film Awards	Grand Prize	Detention	Won	
2020	2020 Taipei Film Awards	Best Narrative Feature	Detention	Won	
2020	2020 Taipei Film Awards	Best Actress	Gingle Wang	Won	
2020	2020 Taipei Film Awards	Best Art Design	Wang Chih-cheng	Won	
2020	2020 Taipei Film Awards	Best Visual Effects	Tomi Kuo	Won	
2020	2020 Taipei Film Awards	Best Sound Design	Dennis Tsao, Book Chien	Won	
2020	14th Asian Film Awards	Best Visual Effects	Tomi Kijo, Renovatio Pictures	Won	
2020	14th Asian Film Awards	Best New Director	John Hsu	Nominated	
