= Red Candle Games =

Video game developer

Red Candle Games Co., Ltd.
- Native name: 赤燭股份有限公司
- Type: Independent
- Industry: Video games
- Founded: September 1, 2015
- Founders: Henry Wang; Light Wang; Coffee Yao; Doy Chiang; Finger Chen; Vincent Yang
- Headquarters: Taipei, Taiwan
- Number of employees: 12
- Website: redcandlegames.com

Red Candle Games Co., Ltd. (Chinese: 赤燭股份有限公司) is a Taiwanese independent video game development studio based in Taipei, Taiwan. The studio is most known for developing Detention (2017), Devotion (2019), and Nine Sols (2024).

== History ==
Red Candle Games was founded on September 1, 2015, by six individuals from different backgrounds to create Detention, a psychological horror video game set in 1960s White Terror-era Taiwan. Released in January 2017 for Steam, Detention received positive reviews from critics, with Polygon's Ashley Oh noting "it elegantly blends religious and thematic East Asian references with modern aspects of the mid-20th century". Detention was adapted into a film in 2019, and later adapted into a TV series in 2020.

After Detention, Red Candle Games began work on their second release, Devotion, another psychological horror video game, this time set in Taiwan in the 1980s. Devotion was released in February 2019 to initially positive reception, but when Chinese players discovered hidden easter eggs in the game which include visual references mocking Chinese Communist Party general secretary Xi Jinping, it was pulled in China. Red Candle Games issued an apology for the incident and removed the game globally from Steam. Chen Chi-mai, Taiwan's then Vice Premier, voiced his support for the developers. For a short period in June 2020, a physical release of Devotion was available for pre-order in Taiwan alone.

In March 2021, Red Candle Games launched an e-shop on their official website which sold both of their games.

In December 2021, the studio announced their next project being Nine Sols, a 2D hand-drawn action-platformer inspired by Sekiro: Shadows Die Twice, Hollow Knight, and Katana Zero, with the former for its deflection-focused combat system. It is described by the developer as "lore-rich", being set in an Asian fantasy-inspired, futuristic, cyberpunk world that tells the story of a vengeful hero on a quest to slay the eponymous 9 Sols, the formidable rulers of a forsaken realm where the hero must explore while discovering the mysteries of an ancient alien race and learning about the fate of mankind. The developers also described the game's setting as "Taopunk", cyberpunk mixed with Taoism and Far Eastern mythology. In March 2022, Red Candle Games launched a crowdfunding campaign for Nine Sols on their online store and pledged NT $3 million. The crowdfunding was a huge success, raising over NT $13.6 million over the initial pledge and crossing three stretch goals (a story mode, an in-game cutscene, and an alternate ending).

== Games developed ==
| Year | Title | Platform(s) | | | | | | | | | |
| Year | Title | Android | iOS | Linux | macOS | PS4 | PS5 | Win | NS | XOne | XSeries X&S |
|---|---|---|---|---|---|---|---|---|---|---|---|
| 2017 | Detention | Yes | Yes | Yes | Yes | Yes | No | Yes | Yes | No | No |
| 2019 | Devotion | No | No | No | Yes | No | No | Yes | No | No | No |
| 2024 | Nine Sols | No | No | No | Yes | Yes | Yes | Yes | Yes | Yes | Yes |

== See also ==
- Internet censorship in China § Winnie the Pooh
