= John Hsu (filmmaker) =

Taiwanese film director

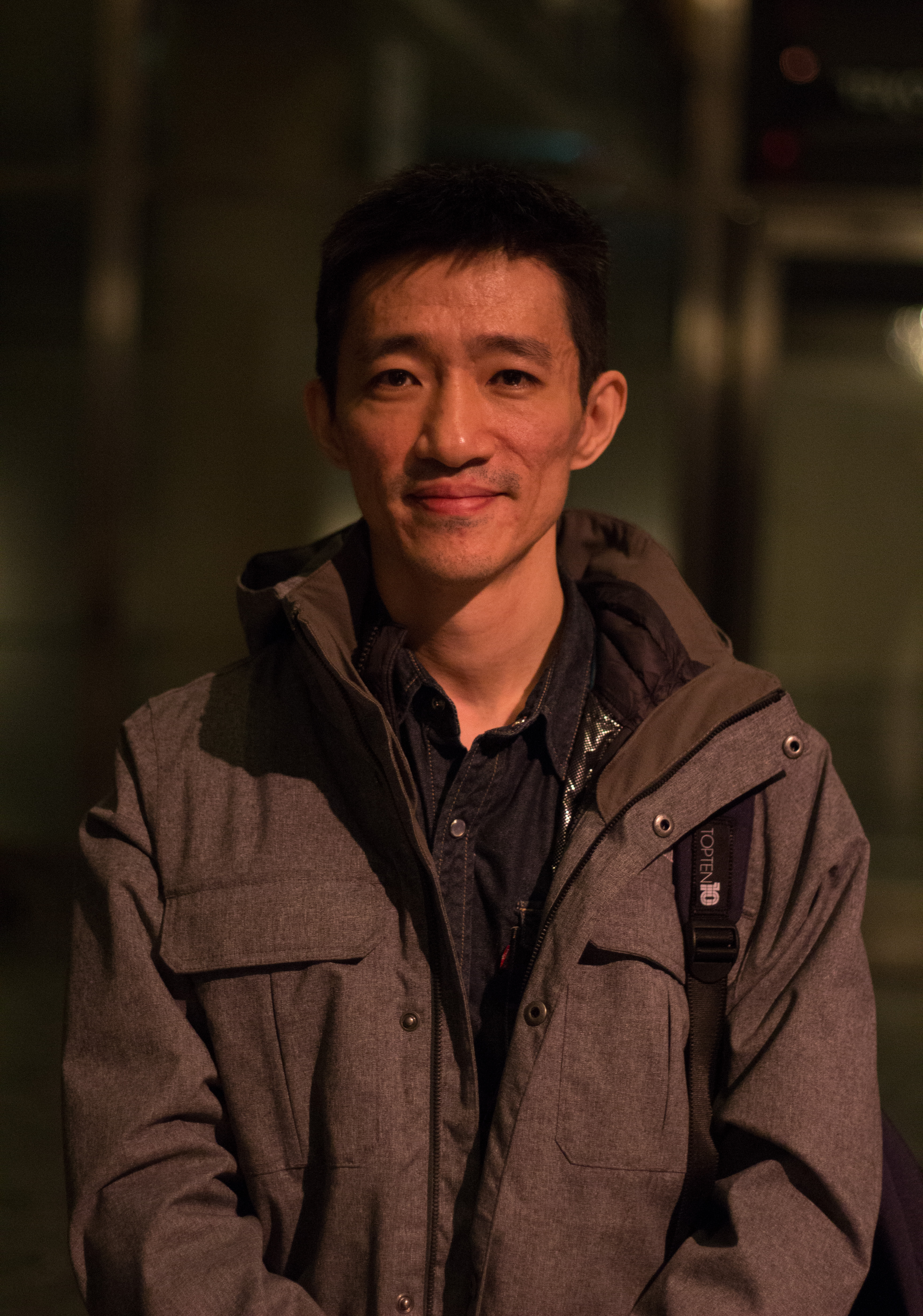
Hsu at the International Film Festival Rotterdam 2020

John Hsu (Chinese: 徐漢強) is a Taiwanese film director.

His debut feature film Detention (2019), was based on the video game of the same name. It was nominated for twelve prizes at the 56th Golden Horse Awards and won five, including Best Adapted Screenplay, shared by Fu Kai-ling and Chien Shih-keng. Hsu also won Best New Director.

== Filmography ==
- 2019 : Detention (返校)
- 2024 : Dead Talents Society (鬼才之道)
