= Hsia Teng-hung =

Taiwanese actor (born 1991)

- 夏騰宏
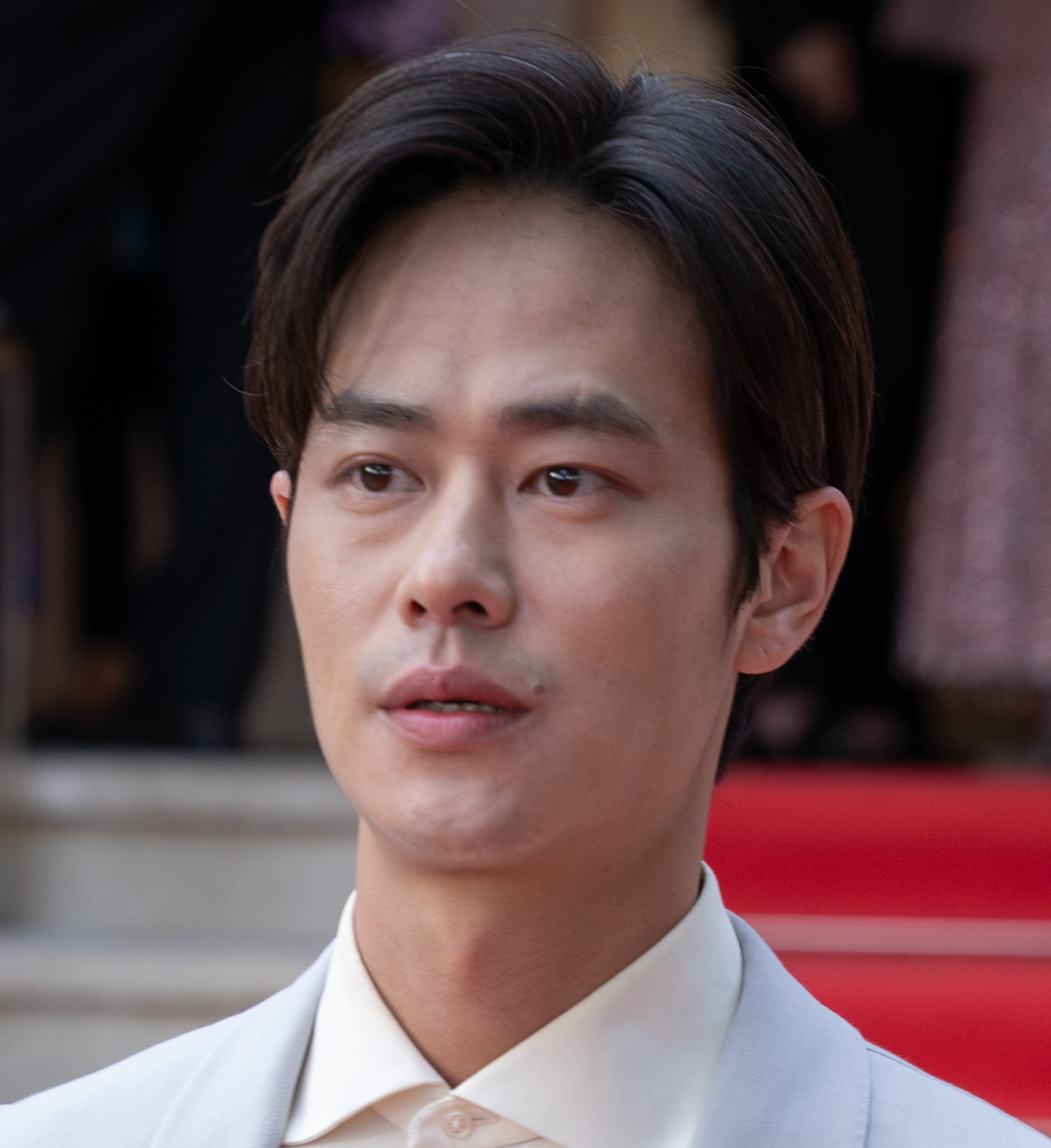
- Hsia in May 2025
- Born: 1991 (age 34–35); Taiwan
- Occupation: Actor
- Years active: 2017–present
- Spouse: Unknown (m. 2018)
- Children: 1

Hsia Teng-hung (Chinese: 夏騰宏; born 1991) is a Taiwanese actor best known for his debut role as Da-peng in the PTS television series Days We Started at the Sun II (2017), for which he received a nomination for Best Newcomer in a Miniseries or Television Film in the 53rd Golden Bell Awards. He also landed starring roles in the political drama series Island Nation (2020), as well as in the Netflix series Detention (2020) and Copycat Killer (2023).

== Early life ==
Hsia was born in 1991, and grew up with an elder sister. His father worked in construction and often took him to watch movies, where he developed a love for films. He began watching Hong Kong movies since he was three, which he credits as a major influence on his performing style. Hsia's parents divorced when he was seven, and he lived with his father afterward. Hsia attended four primary schools in Wulai District, New Taipei City, and two junior high schools in Taipei, explaining that he frequently switched schools due to "boredom". After graduating from junior high, Hsia moved to Chiayi to continue his studies. However, during that time, southern Taiwan still enforced hair regulations, and Hsia, who had long hair, was deemed "a troublemaker" by the teaching staff, prompting him to return to Taipei shortly thereafter. He took six years to graduate high school, and was discovered by a talent scout during this period, which led to opportunities in film shoots, although he was quickly dismissed due to his "carefree attitude" and "lack of acting skills". After graduation, Hsia worked in various jobs, including at a hotel, a restaurant, a cinema, a host club, and a boutique. While working at the boutique, he met several costume designers who invited him to shoot music videos and make onscreen cameo appearances, including in the music video of Li Ronghao's "Full House", which sparked his interest in acting and prompted him to pursue auditions.

== Career ==
Hsia made his acting debut in the PTS television series Days We Stared at the Sun II, which was directed and written by Cheng Yu-chieh. Cheng personally cast Hsia, drawn to his deep voice, which he felt was suitable for the character. Hsia's performance earned him a nomination for Best Newcomer in a Miniseries or Television Film in the 53rd Golden Bell Awards. Following this breakout role, he received over twenty role offers, and landed a main role in the web series Game Not Over the same year.

In 2019, Hsia took on a recurring role as Sie in the crime series The World Between Us, and joined the main cast of the second season of the drama series The Mirror. He also starred in the drama films Deep Evil and Wild Sparrow that year. In 2020, Hsia secured a main role as Chiang Chih-wei in the political thriller series Island Nation, followed by a leading role in the family drama series Mother to Be. Hsia then had a recurring role as Chang Ming-hui in the psychological horror series Detention, where his performance in the death scene received critical acclaim. In 2021, he had a supporting role in the drama film Final Exam.

Hsia experienced another breakout performance in the Netflix crime thriller series Copycat Killer portraying Hu Jian-ho, an investigative journalist and the brother of Ko Chia-yen's character. His character is disfigured and required special makeup throughout the entire shoot, and his performance was well received. He also had a supporting role in the 2023 drama film Miss Shampoo and starred in the second segment of the drama series Haunted House for Sale the following year. In 2024, Hsia landed a lead role in the romantic film The Time of Huan Nan.

== Personal life ==
Hsia got married in 2018 and has a daughter.

== Filmography ==
=== Film ===
Year	Title	Role	Notes/Ref.
2019	Deep Evil	Tu Yong (塗勇)	
2019	Wild Sparrow	Lian (連仔)	
2021	Final Exam	Frog (田雞)	
2023	Miss Shampoo	Four-Eye (眼鏡仔)	
2024	The Time of Huan Nan	Chen Yao-hua/Liu Yong-hui (陳耀華/劉永輝)	
2025	Left-Handed Girl	A-Ming	

=== Television ===
Year	Title	Role	Notes/Ref.
2017	Days We Stared at the Sun II	Da Peng (大鵬)	Main role
2017	Game Not Over	Hsu Kuan-you (許冠佑)	Main role
2019	The World Between Us	Sie (老謝)	Recurring role
2019	The Mirror	Peng Yu-an (彭育安)	Main role (season 2)
2020	Island Nation	Chiang Chih-wei (江志偉)	Main role
2020	Mother to Be	Wu Da-chi (吳大志)	Main role
2020	The Greater Good	Liu Hao-ran (劉皓然)	Main role; television film
2020	Detention	Chang Ming-hui (張明暉)	Recurring role
2021	Tears on Fire	Chung (阿忠)	Recurring role
2021	Danger Zone	Mu Ya-yan (穆亞彥)	Guest role
2023	Copycat Killer	Hu Jian-ho (胡建和)	Main role
2024	Haunted House for Sale	Chiang Wei-chi (張偉志)	Main role (segment 2)
2024	Black Tide Island	Li Mu-hsiung (李木雄)	Main role
2025	The Outlaw Doctor	Wu Chen-hua (吳振華)	Main role

== Awards and nominations ==
Year	Award	Category	Work	Result	Ref.
2018	53rd Golden Bell Awards	Best Newcomer in a Miniseries or Television Film	Days We Stared at the Sun II	Nominated	
