= Devotion (video game) =

2019 survival horror video game

- Developer: Red Candle Games
- Publisher: Red Candle Games (Note: Formerly published by Indievent and Winking Skywalker)
- Producer: Doy Chiang
- Artists: Tien Jung Huang; Hans Chen
- Writers: Chuan Hsiang Dang; Shun Ting Yao
- Engine: Unity
- Platforms: Microsoft Windows, macOS
- Release: WW: February 19, 2019
- Genres: Survival horror, puzzle
- Mode: Single-player

Devotion (Chinese: 還願; pinyin: Háiyuàn; lit. 'Fulfilling a vow') is a first-person psychological horror video game developed by Red Candle Games. It is set in Taiwan in the 1980s, with a majority of the game happening in an apartment complex in Taipei. The game also incorporates elements based on Taiwanese culture and folk religion. The game was released on February 19, 2019, but was removed from Steam shortly afterwards on February 26, after a controversial Easter egg referencing Xi Jinping, General Secretary of the Chinese Communist Party, was found in the game. The game was re-released on March 15, 2021, on Red Candle Games' own digital store.

== Synopsis ==
Players, for the most part, control the troubled screenwriter Du Feng-yu (杜豐于) through a Taipei apartment with rooms that represent various years in the lives of the Du family during the 1980s. The family consists of Feng-yu, his wife Gong Li-fang (鞏莉芳), a retired singer, and their daughter Du Mei-shin (杜美心), an aspiring child singer. Feng-yu's screenwriting career has stagnated while Mei-shin begins to show signs of a mysterious illness. As the family's financial situation deteriorates, Li-fang has frequent arguments with her husband regarding her desire to return to work so she can help support the family. Despite Li-fang's offers, Feng-yu refuses to let her work due to his own insecurities.

In the midst of the domestic disputes, Mei-shin enters a popular singing contest, seeking to please her parents by becoming a popular singer. However, her performance of her mother's signature song "Lady of the Pier" (碼頭姑娘) comes one point shy of advancing to the next round. Mei-shin's condition worsens after the setback and she becomes unable to sing. Despite a doctor's suggestion that the family seek psychiatric care for Mei-shin's illness, Feng-yu instead begins to follow the teachings of cult leader Mentor Heuh (何老師) about the folk deity Cigu Guanyin (慈孤觀音) (fictional deity based off name merging of Zigu and Guanyin), who could supposedly help cure his daughter. When Feng-yu becomes increasingly obsessed with Mentor Heuh, Li-fang attempts to convince her husband to snap out of his obsession, but Feng-yu accuses her of being "possessed by evil spirits". Realizing her husband will not listen to her, Li-fang eventually leaves the family.

Seeing the downward spiral of her family, Mei-shin asks her father to help her fold origami tulips, believing that she will be healed when enough have been folded to fill her room. Instead, as instructed by Mentor Heuh after a séance, Feng-yu performs a dark ritual by submerging his daughter in a bathtub filled with snake wine, then locking her up in the bathroom for seven days, presumably causing her death. A post-credits scene shows Feng-yu sitting alone in his apartment, in front of a TV displaying noise – whether or not he is still alive is left ambiguous. Upon finishing the game, the sound of banging on a door and dog barking can be heard on the main menu.

== Gameplay ==
The player looking through their inventory

The game is an adventure game, where the player explores the apartment complex where Feng-yu and his family live. In certain sections, the player can also play as Mei-shin. Devotion is composed of different levels which each represent a different year, which can be freely switched between through the lobby. The player can interact with different objects and examine them, and read letters and diaries scattered around the home. Players can add certain items to their inventory, which can be used to solve puzzles which often require items from different time periods.

== Development ==
Devotion draws inspiration from atmospheric first-person games like P.T., What Remains of Edith Finch and Layers of Fear. Red Candle cites the reason for creating a horror game was a narrative decision to introduce players to Taiwanese culture. The developers of the game expressed a desire to make an atmospheric game that feels familiar with Taiwanese players, explaining that the culture of Taiwan rarely gets showcased in video games. In its planning stages, Devotion was not visualized to be a first-person 3D game, but subsequent discussions steered the game into that direction to realize producer Doy Chiang's vision. The development team, which consists of 12 people, had to learn the Unity 3D game engine as a result.

Unlike their first game, Red Candle says that Devotion was not intended to be political, but was instead about "religious fanaticism". The studio also mentions that translation was difficult, as they had to communicate Taiwan-specific concepts to an international audience in different languages.

=== Music ===
Devotion's soundtrack was composed by Taiwanese composer Vincent Yang and incorporates traditional Asian instruments and elements of folk music. It was released on Steam as a DLC.

The album also includes a title track written and performed by the Taiwanese indie band and 2017 Golden Melody Awards winner, No Party for Cao Dong, and the song "Lady of the Pier" (碼頭姑娘), which appeared during the game and in the ending.

=== Sound design ===
Devotion's sound design was handled by Singapore-based game audio studio Imba Interactive. It also sought to capture the ambience of 1980s Taiwan through thorough research and empirical interviews. The studio utilised field recordings obtained from Taiwan during the development, as well as studio recordings of a myriad of props in Singapore. The sound engine utilised was Audiokinetic Wwise.

== Releases and controversy ==
Devotion launched for Microsoft Windows through Steam on February 19, 2019.

On February 21, 2019, two days after the game's release, players discovered a fulu talisman decorating a wall in the game contained the words "Xi Jinping Winnie the Pooh" (Chinese: 習近平小熊維尼) in Chinese seal script, referencing an internet meme that compares the Chinese general secretary to the Disney character. Also on the talisman were the transcribed words "ní ma bā qì" (呢嘛叭唭), which sounds similar to "nǐ mā bā qī" (你媽八七) in Mandarin. "你媽" means "your mother (is a)"; and "八七" (peh tshit) sounds similar to "白痴" (pe̍h-tshi, means "moron") in Taiwanese Hokkien. Taken together, this was interpreted by Chinese gamers as an insult to the Chinese leader. As a result, Devotion was heavily review bombed by Chinese gamers on Steam, and the game went from having "Overwhelmingly Positive" reviews overall to being "Mostly Negative". Red Candle Games responded by patching out the offending art material, replacing it with a talisman that reads "Happy New Year" (恭賀新禧), explaining that the original talisman was a placeholder that was supposed to be replaced, and apologizing for the oversight. Nevertheless, other aspects of the game were analyzed as insults to China, leading to the game being removed from Steam in China on February 23. Publishers Indievent and Winking Skywalker cut ties with Red Candle Games, with Red Candle Games being liable for their losses as a result of the controversy. On February 25, Red Candle removed the game from Steam globally to fix technical issues, as well as to confirm that no other hidden messages remain.

Taiwan's Vice Premier Chen Chi-mai spoke out in defense of the game regarding the "Easter egg", saying: "Only in countries with democracy and freedom can creation be free from restrictions." Red Candle's Sina Weibo account remains blocked, and posts containing the hashtag #Devotion, which had hundreds of millions of views before the controversy, were hidden by Chinese censors. The episode has raised concerns about the future of the Steam platform in China, which did not gain official approval to operate there but remains accessible with up to 30 million users from China.

In July 2019, the Chinese government revoked the license of Indievent. The official statement from the government stated that the revoking was due to violating relevant laws. Red Candle Games released an apology later in the month stating that they have no plans to re-release Devotion in the near term in order "to prevent unnecessary misconception", but would reconsider re-releasing the game in the future if "the public would be willing to view this game rationally".

In June 2020, Red Candle announced that it would begin running pre-orders for a physical edition of the game, available only in Taiwan from June 8 to 15.

On December 16, 2020, Red Candle Games and GOG.com announced that the game would be available on GOG's store on December 18. However, a few hours later, GOG issued a statement on Twitter that "after receiving many messages from gamers," they had decided not to move forward with the release. The statement rapidly garnered thousands of comments and retweets, the majority of which came from fans who were angered to see the store cancelling the release. Jeff Grubb at VentureBeat questioned whether the company indeed received a significant number of complaints from gamers, or whether it was just trying to protect its brand from Chinese authorities, suggesting that the company's tweet shifted the "blame" from itself or Chinese authorities to the "gamers".

On March 15, 2021, Red Candle Games opened their own digital storefront to sell Devotion as well as their prior game Detention and future games. The games were offered as DRM-free versions. A macOS version was released alongside this.

== Reception ==
Reception

Aggregate scores
Aggregator	Score
Metacritic	86/100
OpenCritic	95% recommend

Review scores
Publication	Score
Edge	9/10
Eurogamer	Recommended
Game Informer	8.2/10
GameSpot	9/10
IGN	8.2/10
Jeuxvideo.com	14/20

Devotion received generally favorable reviews from critics, according to the review aggregation website Metacritic. Fellow review aggregator OpenCritic assessed that the game received strong approval, being recommended by 95% of critics.

A number of critics made favorable comparisons of Devotion with P.T. and Gone Home, all first-person exploration games that subvert the safe and secure feeling of home. David Jagneaux of IGN gave Devotion a positive review, praising it as "a fantastic psychological horror game that's short, concise, and well-paced from start to finish." Despite the "wonderful environmental storytelling", Jagneaux felt that the actual gameplay is "relatively unimpressive and boring". Richard Wakeling from GameSpot singled out Red Candle Game's attention to detail that "establishes and effectively reinforces Devotion's disconcerting sense of familiarity", but pointed out that the chase sequence late in the game is "regrettable" in what is otherwise a game that resists frustrating trial-and-error stealth sections and monotonous combat in many contemporary horror games. Michelle Brohier from Stuff Malaysia praised the game's references to East Asian culture in lore and horror, but commented that its epilogue didn't deliver much impact after its captivating build up.

In February 2020, Devotion as well as Red Candle's other game Detention were selected for preservation at the Harvard–Yenching Library, the largest collection of East Asian works maintained at an American university.

== See also ==
- Ex-voto
- Religious fanaticism
- Xi Jinping § Censorship
- Toilet god
