= Asian American International Film Festival =

Annual film festival in New York City

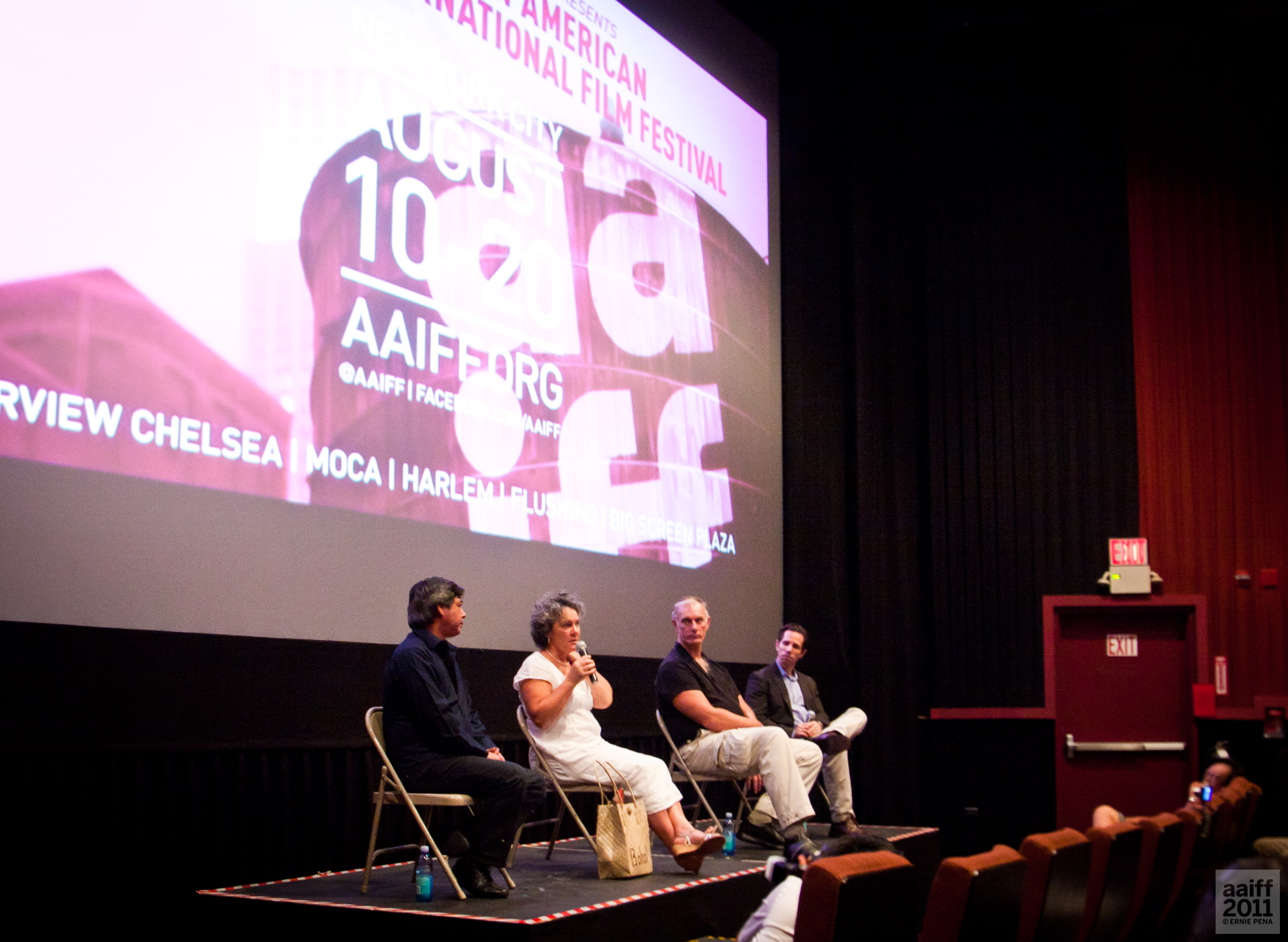
- Opening Night of feature film Amigo, with director John Sayles
- Location: New York City, United States
- Founded: 1978; 48 years ago
- Language: International
- Website: aaiff.org

The Asian American International Film Festival (AAIFF) is the first and longest-running film festival to showcase the works of emerging and experienced Asian and Asian American filmmakers and media artists in the US.

The programming includes a diverse range of genres and styles, and is supplemented by filmmaker talkbacks, workshops, and networking events. The festival is held annually during the summer in New York City.

== History ==
In 1975, grassroots media activists Peter Chow, Danny Yung, Thomas Tam and Christine Choy founded Asian CineVision (ACV), a nonprofit media arts organization "dedicated to promoting and preserving Asian and Asian American media expressions", under the name CCTV (Chinese Cable TV) in New York’s Chinatown. At a time of need for assertion on the part of diverse cultural groups, claiming their voices and places in a landscape that had been dominated by European Americans, ACV’s founders saw the need to bring greater social and cultural awareness of Asian American experience and history to both Asian American communities and to the public at large. Moving-image media had become the nation’s common language, its most pervasive source of images and ideas, and Asian Americans barely registered on its screens. ACV’s founders wanted to address problems faced by Asian Americans in both representation in the media and access to the means of media production and distribution. Technologies and outlets for independent media were multiplying, creating new possibilities for Asian Americans in every style and platform of media arts.

In 1978 ACV organized the Asian American Film Festival, the first in the U.S. to showcase the best in independent Asian and Asian American cinema. It was a three-day program of 46 films and videos at the Henry Street Settlement on New York’s Lower Eastside. Later screening venues included New York University (1979-1984), Rosemary Theatre (1985-1995), The French Institute (1996-2001), Asia Society (2002-2008), Chelsea Clearview Cinema, School of Visual Arts, Quad Cinema and Museum of Chinese in America (2009–present). AAIFFʼs primary goal is to exhibit the most current achievements in Asian/Asian American independent media-making to broad audiences—some 100 short and feature films each year. Seeking to create a setting where artists, scholars, and cultural enthusiasts can meet and explore how to push creative bounds and the development of relevant media. Finally, the AAIFF presents works by media makers from various ethnic backgrounds, religions, classes, and creeds, in order to promote an understanding that Asian and Asian American experiences are complex and multiple.

AAIFF satellite venues include Queens Museum, Cinema Arts Centre, Brooklyn Heights Cinema, SUNY Stonybrook, Flushing Town Hall, Maysles Institute, Clearview Bergenfield 5, and Queen Library Flushing Branch. The films presented in AAIFF are featured in the annual National Festival Tour that has historically provided the seed-stock for most of the Asian American festivals that have sprung up in subsequent years around the country. Over the years, AAIFF has screened films from over twenty countries including: Canada, China (Hong-Kong and mainland), India, Japan, South Korea, Malaysia, Singapore, Taiwan, the Philippines, Australia, New Zealand, Iran, Germany, England, Afghanistan, Vietnam, Thailand, Cambodia, Cuba, Indonesia, and Bhutan. ACV has also accomplished much to open exchange and introduce audiences to works from Asia and the Asian Diaspora. At the peak of its funding and program activity in addition to the annual AAIFF and the National Festival Tour, year-round activities included Videoscape, Children’s Film Festival and other exhibitions in film and video, media-production services for independent artists and producers in New York, publications including the quarterly media arts journal CineVue, a print and media archive, and a range of training workshops.
