= Yang Lie =

Taiwanese singer and actor

- 楊烈
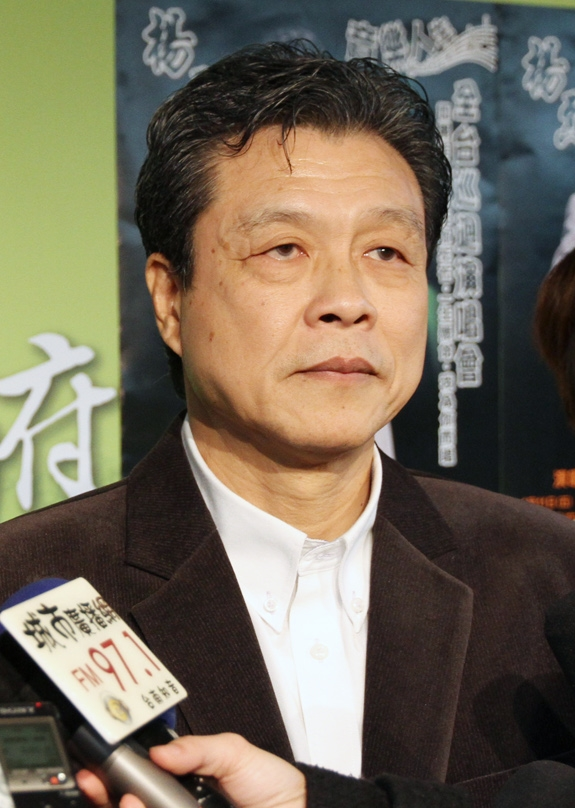
- Born: 13 October 1952 (age 73)
- Occupations: Singer, actor

Yang Lie (Chinese: 楊烈; pinyin: Yáng Liè; Pe̍h-ōe-jī: Iûⁿ Lia̍t; born 13 October 1952) is a Taiwanese singer and actor.

Yang Lie has filmed a public service announcement with Dwagie meant to draw attention to stray cats in Taiwan. During the 2012 Taiwan legislative election, Yang represented the Democratic Progressive Party as its candidate in Taipei 1 against Ting Shou-chung. A review of the film Maverick (2015) praised his performance.

== Selected filmography ==
- Unique Flavor (2008)
- In a Good Way (2013)
- Prince of Wolf (2016)
- Refresh Man (2016)
- In the Family (2017)
- Pigeon Tango (2017)
