= Detention (video game) =

2017 horror-themed point-and-click video game

- Developer: Red Candle Games
- Publisher: Red Candle Games
- Engine: Unity
- Platforms: PlayStation 4, Microsoft Windows, MacOS, Linux, Nintendo Switch, Android
- Release: Windows, OS X, Linux; WW: 13 January 2017; PlayStation 4; NA: 3 October 2017; EU: 1 March 2018; Nintendo Switch; WW: 1 March 2018; Android; WW: 5 September 2019
- Genre: Point-and-click adventure
- Mode: Single-player

Detention
- Traditional Chinese: 返校
- Literal meaning: Returning to School
Transcriptions
Standard Mandarin
- Hanyu Pinyin: Fǎn xiào
Southern Min
- Hokkien POJ: Hoán-hāu

Detention (Chinese: 返校; pinyin: Fǎnxiào; lit. 'Returning to School') is a horror adventure video game created and developed by Taiwanese game developer Red Candle Games for Steam. It is a 2D atmospheric horror side-scroller set in 1960s Taiwan under martial law. The game also incorporates religious elements based on Taiwanese culture and mythology. The game was released on 13 January 2017. A demo version was released on Steam Greenlight on 13 June 2016.

The game's concept originates with the Red Candle Games co-founder Shun-ting "Coffee" Yao. In February 2017, a novel based on the game was published by novelist Ling Jing. A live action film adaptation distributed by Warner Bros. Taiwan was released on 20 September 2019.

== Synopsis ==
Set in 1960s Taiwan of the White Terror period, students Wei and Ray find themselves trapped and vulnerable in Greenwood High School (翠華中學), which is located in a remote mountainous area. The place they once knew has changed in unsettling ways, haunted by evil creatures known as the "lingered" (魍魎). While hiding from the rampaging monsters, the protagonists unveil mysteries that slowly reveal the dark past of the cursed school.

== Plot ==
During the White Terror Period in Taiwan, Greenwood High School junior student Wei Chung-Ting (魏仲廷) falls asleep in class as Instructor Bai (白教官) arrives to ask teacher Miss Yin Tsui-Han (殷翠涵) about a certain book list. The scene fades and he awakens to find the campus deserted due to an incoming typhoon. While leaving, he encounters a senior, Fang Ray-Shin (方芮欣), asleep on the auditorium stage. With the bridge to the school washed out in the river, they decide to wait out the storm in Wei's classroom. Wei leaves to look for a telephone, and the game shifts to Ray waking up in the auditorium again, this time in a nightmarish version of the school with Wei's corpse hanging upside down from the stage ceiling. After performing a ritual where she cuts Wei's throat and collects his blood, Ray wanders the rest of the school, avoiding different kinds of ghosts, solving puzzles, and finding clues, as her story is slowly pieced together.

Ray was once a bright student but developed depression due to problems at home. The school notices her falling grades and sends her to speak with the school counselor, Chang Ming-Hui (張明暉). She and Chang develop a romantic relationship, though she is unaware that Chang helps Miss Yin smuggle banned books for a secret club where Wei and several other students are also members. After they finish counseling sessions, Chang ends their relationship, leaving Ray heartbroken. She overhears Chang and Miss Yin in the auditorium arguing about how his relationship with Ray can endanger their book club, and she misinterprets this as Miss Yin being in a relationship with Chang as well. She passes out on the stage, leading to the events at the start of the game when Wei wakes her up.

On the night of the typhoon, Ray gets Wei to tell her about the book club and how Miss Yin is involved. She later convinces Wei to give her a copy of the book list. Inspired by the way her mother got rid of her abusive and philandering father by framing and reporting him to the authorities, Ray gives the list to Instructor Bai, a military officer, hoping it would get Miss Yin fired. However, this led to the arrest of Wei and the other student members, while Miss Yin fled the country. Chang, on the other hand, was executed. Believing herself responsible for Chang, Wei, and the other students' deaths, coupled with the bullying she received, Ray jumped off a school building. The player is actually playing as Ray's soul going through a cycle of purgatory as her soul refuses to accept her guilt.

Towards the end, Ray's shadow appears and asks her a series of questions. If Ray refuses to acknowledge her actions and guilt, the shadow states that she and Ray are not the same, and Ray walks down a path beside a river of blood, with Wei, Chang, and Miss Yin telling her the cycle will not end. She enters the auditorium where people applaud her as her shadow awards her with a noose. Ray hangs herself, and the auditorium fades into its abandoned state in the present, implying Ray's soul will repeat the cycle.

If she accepts her guilt, the true ending is unlocked. Ray finds a paper airplane containing a message of love and farewell from Chang and heads to his office. She witnesses Chang's arrest, and he tells Ray that people should be born to live freely without fear of oppression. The game shifts to the present. Wei, now a middle-aged man, is revealed to be alive and was sentenced to fifteen years of imprisonment with hard labor, but was pardoned following the end of the White Terror. His journal reveals Miss Yin spent the rest of her life abroad as an activist but died of lung cancer before she could return home. Wei heads to his old classroom and sits at his desk as Ray's ghost sits across from him.

== Development ==
During the prototype stage, Detention was originally meant to be a horror game called Devilpolis (魔都) by Coffee Yao. Yao felt that the game did not have a core story. So they scrapped the original idea and made their second prototype with a Taiwanese dystopia setting inspired by George Orwell's Nineteen Eighty-Four. Later, he decided rather than to make a fictional setting, he could make use of Taiwan's existing history and set the story during Taiwan's period of military rule. The school setting and the name of the game (返校, "return to school" in Chinese) were meant to resonate with the general public as a shared human experience. As the project expanded in scale, Yao was joined by 5 others and together founded the studio Abyss Watcher (眺望者工作室), later renamed Red Candle Games. The game officially started development in February 2015.

Detention's background music was composed by Taiwanese composer Weifan Chang who made use of Taiwanese elements like the suona used in Taiwanese funerary music. In addition, the soundtrack includes songs by Teng Yu-hsien that were banned by the military government in the 1960s such as "Bāng Chhun-hong" and "The Torment of a Flower". The soundtrack was released with the game on Steam as a DLC.

== Reception ==
Reception

Aggregate scores
Aggregator	Score
Metacritic	PC: 83/100; PS4: 83/100; NS: 79/100
OpenCritic	81% recommend

Review scores
Publication	Score
Destructoid	7.5/10
Nintendo Life	9/10
Nintendo World Report	7.5/10

The game received "generally favorable" reviews, according to review aggregator Metacritic. Fellow review aggregator OpenCritic assessed that the game received strong approval, being recommended by 81% of critics. Rely on Horror gave the game a 9 out of 10, saying that "every facet of Detention moves in one harmonious lockstep towards an unavoidable tragedy, drowning out the world around you." Upon the game's release in January 2017, the user review on Steam was overwhelmingly positive. Detention topped the game ranking on Steam in Taiwan and reached 6th in Steam ranking globally within 3 days of its release.

Detention as well as Red Candle's next game Devotion will be preserved at the Harvard-Yenching Library, the largest collection of East Asian works maintained at an American university.

== Adaptations ==
Red Candle sold production rights for a film to 1 Production Film Co. on 21 June 2017. The film of the same name stars Gingle Wang as Fang Ray Shin and it was released in Taiwan on 20 September 2019.

A television series adaptation named Detention: The Series was announced for Netflix. Produced in collaboration with Taiwan Public Television Service (PTS), the Chinese-language original series premiered worldwide on Netflix exclusively on 5 December 2020. The TV show acts as a direct sequel to the plot of the video game and the movie.

== See also ==
- February 28 Incident
- Anti-communism
- The Torment of a Flower
- History of Taiwan
- Political status of Taiwan
- Politics of the Republic of China
- Period of mobilization for the suppression of Communist rebellion
- Chen Wen-chen
- Henry Liu
