= His Son's Big Doll =

Collection of short stories written by Huang Chunming

Son's Big Doll (Chinese: 兒子的大玩偶) is a collection of short stories written by Huang Chunming, a significant Taiwanese realistic novelist, during the 1960s and 1970s. During the period (the 1960s and 70s) of realism, Taiwanese literature was experiencing a flourishing development of both modernism and realistic localism. Son's Big Doll depicts the struggles and dilemmas of ordinary people in early Taiwanese society. It's one of Huang Chunming's representative works of realism and reflects human emotions and the social culture of the time.

The story follows the protagonist Kunshu, who voluntarily dresses up as a "clown" to work as a promotional gimmick (a so-called "sandwich man") for a movie theater. After returning home, Kunshu always interacts with his child while dressed as a clown. The child becomes accustomed to Kunshu's clown appearance. Eventually, when he no longer needs the makeup job, his own son fails to recognize him. In order to make his son recognize him, Kunshu ends up dressing up as a clown again.

Through the different characters from various eras, professions, and genders in these short stories, Huang Chunming explores Taiwan's transition from an agricultural society to a modern one and the associated issues. He showcases his observations on human nature and his concern for Taiwanese local culture. For instance, in "The Taste of Apple", the treatment received by a worker after being hit by an American colonel's car reflects class disparities. "Uncle Gan's Twilight" portrays the story of an elderly farmer in his late 60s taking care of his mentally ill son who returned from Nanyang (Southeast Asia) after World War II. "I Love Mary" directly addresses the contemporary mentality of blindly admiring foreign influences.

The short stories "Son's Big Doll", "The Taste of Apple", and "Mary's Hat" were adapted into a three-part film The Sandwich Man in 1983. This movie marks the beginning of the "Taiwan New Cinema" movement. These stories have been selected and translated by the noted translator Howard Goldblatt in an English version of Huang Chunming's story collection, The Taste of Apples (2001), which is a republished and expanded version of The Drowning of an Old Cat and Other Stories (1980) published by Indiana University Press in Bloomington.
