= List of minor planets: 777001–778000 =

The following is a partial list of minor planets, running from minor-planet number 777001 through 778000, inclusive. The primary data for this and other partial lists is based on JPL's "Small-Body Orbital Elements" and data available from the Minor Planet Center. Critical list information is also provided by the MPC, unless otherwise specified from Lowell Observatory. A detailed description of the table's columns and additional sources are given on the main page including a complete list of every page in this series, and a statistical break-up on the dynamical classification of minor planets.

Also see the summary list of all named bodies in numerical and alphabetical order, and the corresponding naming citations for the number range of this particular list. New namings may only be added to this list after official publication, as the preannouncement of names is condemned by the Working Group for Small Bodies Nomenclature of the International Astronomical Union.

Near-Earth obj.	MBA (inner)	MBA (outer)	Centaur
Mars-crosser	MBA (middle)	Jupiter trojan	Trans-Neptunian obj.
Unclassified

== 777001–777100 ==
Designation			Discovery			Properties		Ref
Permanent	Provisional	Named after	Date	Site	Discoverer(s)	Category	Diam.	Ref
777001	2008 KF_{49}	—	May 30, 2008	Mount Lemmon	Mount Lemmon Survey	·	1.3 km	MPC · JPL
777002	2008 LY_{18}	—	February 27, 2012	Haleakala	Pan-STARRS 1	·	1.4 km	MPC · JPL
777003	2008 LA_{20}	—	April 27, 2012	Mount Lemmon	Mount Lemmon Survey	·	1.4 km	MPC · JPL
777004	2008 LH_{20}	—	February 14, 2012	Haleakala	Pan-STARRS 1	EOS	1.4 km	MPC · JPL
777005	2008 MA_{2}	—	May 29, 2008	Kitt Peak	Spacewatch	·	1.6 km	MPC · JPL
777006	2008 OX_{4}	—	July 28, 2008	Mount Lemmon	Mount Lemmon Survey	·	1.3 km	MPC · JPL
777007	2008 OC_{13}	—	July 29, 2008	La Sagra	OAM	·	1.8 km	MPC · JPL
777008	2008 ON_{27}	—	April 9, 2016	Haleakala	Pan-STARRS 1	EUN	1.1 km	MPC · JPL
777009	2008 OR_{27}	—	September 19, 2014	Haleakala	Pan-STARRS 1	·	1.9 km	MPC · JPL
777010	2008 OV_{27}	—	February 5, 2016	Haleakala	Pan-STARRS 1	·	1.2 km	MPC · JPL
777011	2008 OZ_{28}	—	January 13, 2011	Mount Lemmon	Mount Lemmon Survey	EOS	1.4 km	MPC · JPL
777012	2008 OG_{29}	—	March 4, 2017	Haleakala	Pan-STARRS 1	EOS	1.4 km	MPC · JPL
777013	2008 OQ_{30}	—	July 29, 2008	Mount Lemmon	Mount Lemmon Survey	L4	7.4 km	MPC · JPL
777014	2008 OZ_{30}	—	August 9, 2013	Haleakala	Pan-STARRS 1	·	1.4 km	MPC · JPL
777015	2008 OM_{32}	—	July 27, 2008	Charleston	R. Holmes	·	1.4 km	MPC · JPL
777016	2008 PX_{23}	—	August 7, 2008	Kitt Peak	Spacewatch	·	1.9 km	MPC · JPL
777017	2008 QP_{3}	—	August 24, 2008	Piszkéstető	K. Sárneczky	·	1.4 km	MPC · JPL
777018 Huangchunming	2008 QG_{33}	Huangchunming	August 29, 2008	Lulin	LUSS	VER	1.9 km	MPC · JPL
777019	2008 QD_{50}	—	August 24, 2008	Kitt Peak	Spacewatch	·	2.2 km	MPC · JPL
777020	2008 RE_{7}	—	September 3, 2008	Kitt Peak	Spacewatch	·	1.4 km	MPC · JPL
777021	2008 RC_{8}	—	September 3, 2008	Kitt Peak	Spacewatch	·	2.5 km	MPC · JPL
777022	2008 RU_{13}	—	September 4, 2008	Kitt Peak	Spacewatch	·	1.5 km	MPC · JPL
777023	2008 RE_{18}	—	September 4, 2008	Kitt Peak	Spacewatch	·	2.4 km	MPC · JPL
777024	2008 RR_{31}	—	September 2, 2008	Kitt Peak	Spacewatch	·	1.1 km	MPC · JPL
777025	2008 RR_{61}	—	September 4, 2008	Kitt Peak	Spacewatch	HOF	2.0 km	MPC · JPL
777026	2008 RW_{61}	—	September 4, 2008	Kitt Peak	Spacewatch	(5)	900 m	MPC · JPL
777027	2008 RE_{87}	—	September 5, 2008	Kitt Peak	Spacewatch	·	1.8 km	MPC · JPL
777028	2008 RH_{93}	—	September 6, 2008	Kitt Peak	Spacewatch	·	1.6 km	MPC · JPL
777029	2008 RG_{95}	—	September 7, 2008	Mount Lemmon	Mount Lemmon Survey	EOS	1.4 km	MPC · JPL
777030	2008 RH_{113}	—	September 5, 2008	Kitt Peak	Spacewatch	·	1.0 km	MPC · JPL
777031	2008 RJ_{122}	—	September 3, 2008	Kitt Peak	Spacewatch	·	2.3 km	MPC · JPL
777032	2008 RU_{130}	—	September 2, 2008	Kitt Peak	Spacewatch	·	1.2 km	MPC · JPL
777033	2008 RU_{141}	—	September 7, 2008	Mount Lemmon	Mount Lemmon Survey	·	1.3 km	MPC · JPL
777034	2008 RC_{148}	—	September 2, 2008	Kitt Peak	Spacewatch	·	1.3 km	MPC · JPL
777035	2008 RH_{152}	—	January 22, 2015	Haleakala	Pan-STARRS 1	MAR	670 m	MPC · JPL
777036	2008 RW_{156}	—	September 19, 1998	Apache Point	SDSS	·	1.4 km	MPC · JPL
777037	2008 RY_{156}	—	August 12, 2013	Haleakala	Pan-STARRS 1	·	1.6 km	MPC · JPL
777038	2008 RN_{158}	—	September 9, 2008	Mount Lemmon	Mount Lemmon Survey	EOS	1.2 km	MPC · JPL
777039	2008 RJ_{159}	—	September 14, 2013	Kitt Peak	Spacewatch	HOF	2.0 km	MPC · JPL
777040	2008 RU_{162}	—	September 5, 2008	Kitt Peak	Spacewatch	·	2.4 km	MPC · JPL
777041	2008 RO_{166}	—	April 5, 2016	Haleakala	Pan-STARRS 1	L4	5.8 km	MPC · JPL
777042	2008 RR_{167}	—	September 6, 2008	Kitt Peak	Spacewatch	·	1.9 km	MPC · JPL
777043	2008 RU_{168}	—	September 4, 2008	Kitt Peak	Spacewatch	·	1.7 km	MPC · JPL
777044	2008 RQ_{169}	—	September 6, 2008	Kitt Peak	Spacewatch	3:2	3.6 km	MPC · JPL
777045	2008 RS_{172}	—	September 2, 2008	Kitt Peak	Spacewatch	·	1.3 km	MPC · JPL
777046	2008 RU_{172}	—	September 7, 2008	Mount Lemmon	Mount Lemmon Survey	·	1.4 km	MPC · JPL
777047	2008 RN_{175}	—	September 5, 2008	Kitt Peak	Spacewatch	L4 · HEK	6.0 km	MPC · JPL
777048	2008 RT_{175}	—	September 5, 2008	Kitt Peak	Spacewatch	HOF	1.9 km	MPC · JPL
777049	2008 RJ_{177}	—	September 6, 2008	Mount Lemmon	Mount Lemmon Survey	·	1.3 km	MPC · JPL
777050	2008 RM_{177}	—	September 6, 2008	Mount Lemmon	Mount Lemmon Survey	KOR	1.0 km	MPC · JPL
777051	2008 RB_{179}	—	September 9, 2008	Kitt Peak	Spacewatch	RAF	670 m	MPC · JPL
777052	2008 RC_{179}	—	September 9, 2008	Mount Lemmon	Mount Lemmon Survey	·	1.4 km	MPC · JPL
777053	2008 RQ_{180}	—	September 5, 2008	Kitt Peak	Spacewatch	L4	6.0 km	MPC · JPL
777054	2008 RD_{181}	—	September 4, 2008	Kitt Peak	Spacewatch	·	1.0 km	MPC · JPL
777055	2008 RL_{182}	—	September 4, 2008	Kitt Peak	Spacewatch	L4 · ERY	6.1 km	MPC · JPL
777056	2008 RM_{182}	—	September 7, 2008	Mount Lemmon	Mount Lemmon Survey	L4 · ERY	5.5 km	MPC · JPL
777057	2008 RL_{184}	—	September 3, 2008	Kitt Peak	Spacewatch	HOF	1.7 km	MPC · JPL
777058	2008 RB_{185}	—	September 7, 2008	Mount Lemmon	Mount Lemmon Survey	VER	1.9 km	MPC · JPL
777059	2008 RJ_{185}	—	September 4, 2008	Kitt Peak	Spacewatch	·	1.3 km	MPC · JPL
777060	2008 RV_{185}	—	September 6, 2008	Mount Lemmon	Mount Lemmon Survey	·	1.4 km	MPC · JPL
777061	2008 RX_{186}	—	September 7, 2008	Mount Lemmon	Mount Lemmon Survey	·	1.7 km	MPC · JPL
777062	2008 RH_{187}	—	September 4, 2008	Kitt Peak	Spacewatch	·	1.1 km	MPC · JPL
777063	2008 RP_{187}	—	September 6, 2008	Mount Lemmon	Mount Lemmon Survey	KOR	910 m	MPC · JPL
777064	2008 RF_{189}	—	September 7, 2008	Mount Lemmon	Mount Lemmon Survey	·	1.4 km	MPC · JPL
777065	2008 SA_{48}	—	September 5, 2008	Kitt Peak	Spacewatch	·	1.3 km	MPC · JPL
777066	2008 SG_{82}	—	September 24, 2008	Mount Lemmon	Mount Lemmon Survey	EUN	810 m	MPC · JPL
777067	2008 SR_{124}	—	September 22, 2008	Mount Lemmon	Mount Lemmon Survey	·	1.5 km	MPC · JPL
777068	2008 SF_{128}	—	September 22, 2008	Kitt Peak	Spacewatch	·	1.5 km	MPC · JPL
777069	2008 SZ_{131}	—	October 18, 2003	Apache Point	SDSS	HOF	2.0 km	MPC · JPL
777070	2008 SN_{133}	—	September 23, 2008	Kitt Peak	Spacewatch	·	1.4 km	MPC · JPL
777071	2008 SK_{135}	—	September 23, 2008	Mount Lemmon	Mount Lemmon Survey	MIS	1.8 km	MPC · JPL
777072	2008 ST_{136}	—	September 23, 2008	Kitt Peak	Spacewatch	·	1.6 km	MPC · JPL
777073	2008 SG_{143}	—	September 24, 2008	Mount Lemmon	Mount Lemmon Survey	LUT	3.5 km	MPC · JPL
777074	2008 SK_{159}	—	September 21, 2008	Catalina	CSS	·	1.2 km	MPC · JPL
777075	2008 SF_{171}	—	September 5, 2008	Kitt Peak	Spacewatch	·	1.2 km	MPC · JPL
777076	2008 SO_{184}	—	September 24, 2008	Kitt Peak	Spacewatch	·	1.6 km	MPC · JPL
777077	2008 SC_{188}	—	September 9, 2008	Mount Lemmon	Mount Lemmon Survey	DOR	2.1 km	MPC · JPL
777078	2008 SW_{193}	—	September 25, 2008	Kitt Peak	Spacewatch	·	1.6 km	MPC · JPL
777079	2008 SR_{202}	—	September 26, 2008	Kitt Peak	Spacewatch	(13314)	1.4 km	MPC · JPL
777080	2008 SC_{209}	—	September 25, 2008	Mount Lemmon	Mount Lemmon Survey	DOR	1.7 km	MPC · JPL
777081	2008 SL_{221}	—	September 6, 2008	Kitt Peak	Spacewatch	·	1.2 km	MPC · JPL
777082	2008 SR_{221}	—	September 6, 2008	Kitt Peak	Spacewatch	·	1.3 km	MPC · JPL
777083	2008 SA_{228}	—	September 5, 2008	Kitt Peak	Spacewatch	·	1.8 km	MPC · JPL
777084	2008 SN_{228}	—	September 28, 2008	Mount Lemmon	Mount Lemmon Survey	·	670 m	MPC · JPL
777085	2008 SO_{231}	—	September 28, 2008	Mount Lemmon	Mount Lemmon Survey	L4 · ERY	5.8 km	MPC · JPL
777086	2008 SU_{233}	—	September 28, 2008	Mount Lemmon	Mount Lemmon Survey	·	1.2 km	MPC · JPL
777087	2008 SK_{234}	—	September 28, 2008	Mount Lemmon	Mount Lemmon Survey	·	1.6 km	MPC · JPL
777088	2008 ST_{236}	—	September 29, 2008	Kitt Peak	Spacewatch	·	1.7 km	MPC · JPL
777089	2008 SN_{239}	—	September 29, 2008	Mount Lemmon	Mount Lemmon Survey	·	1.4 km	MPC · JPL
777090	2008 SP_{259}	—	September 23, 2008	Mount Lemmon	Mount Lemmon Survey	·	1.2 km	MPC · JPL
777091	2008 SJ_{262}	—	September 24, 2008	Kitt Peak	Spacewatch	·	920 m	MPC · JPL
777092	2008 SR_{272}	—	September 23, 2008	Mount Lemmon	Mount Lemmon Survey	·	1.2 km	MPC · JPL
777093	2008 SE_{279}	—	September 29, 2008	Kitt Peak	Spacewatch	·	1.5 km	MPC · JPL
777094	2008 SH_{286}	—	September 22, 2008	Mount Lemmon	Mount Lemmon Survey	·	1.2 km	MPC · JPL
777095	2008 SW_{304}	—	September 25, 2008	Kitt Peak	Spacewatch	·	1.4 km	MPC · JPL
777096	2008 SE_{312}	—	September 23, 2008	Mount Lemmon	Mount Lemmon Survey	·	1.1 km	MPC · JPL
777097	2008 SR_{312}	—	September 29, 2008	Kitt Peak	Spacewatch	·	1.3 km	MPC · JPL
777098	2008 SY_{315}	—	September 25, 2008	Kitt Peak	Spacewatch	·	1.2 km	MPC · JPL
777099	2008 SH_{318}	—	September 24, 2008	Mount Lemmon	Mount Lemmon Survey	·	810 m	MPC · JPL
777100	2008 SY_{318}	—	September 23, 2008	Kitt Peak	Spacewatch	·	850 m	MPC · JPL

== 777101–777200 ==
back to top

Designation			Discovery			Properties		Ref
Permanent	Provisional	Named after	Date	Site	Discoverer(s)	Category	Diam.	Ref
777101	2008 SZ_{320}	—	March 24, 2014	Haleakala	Pan-STARRS 1	·	830 m	MPC · JPL
777102	2008 SM_{321}	—	March 15, 2012	Kitt Peak	Spacewatch	·	2.1 km	MPC · JPL
777103	2008 SD_{327}	—	September 29, 2008	Mount Lemmon	Mount Lemmon Survey	·	1.2 km	MPC · JPL
777104	2008 SK_{327}	—	September 21, 2008	Mount Lemmon	Mount Lemmon Survey	·	1.2 km	MPC · JPL
777105	2008 SC_{330}	—	June 12, 2018	Haleakala	Pan-STARRS 1	·	1.8 km	MPC · JPL
777106	2008 SO_{330}	—	September 6, 2008	Kitt Peak	Spacewatch	·	1.9 km	MPC · JPL
777107	2008 SL_{332}	—	September 29, 2008	Mount Lemmon	Mount Lemmon Survey	·	2.4 km	MPC · JPL
777108	2008 SL_{333}	—	February 5, 2011	Haleakala	Pan-STARRS 1	·	3.1 km	MPC · JPL
777109	2008 SU_{333}	—	March 22, 2017	Kitt Peak	Spacewatch	·	2.5 km	MPC · JPL
777110	2008 SV_{333}	—	March 19, 2017	Haleakala	Pan-STARRS 1	·	2.1 km	MPC · JPL
777111	2008 SA_{337}	—	January 9, 2016	Haleakala	Pan-STARRS 1	·	1.9 km	MPC · JPL
777112	2008 SJ_{337}	—	April 20, 2017	Haleakala	Pan-STARRS 1	·	1.6 km	MPC · JPL
777113	2008 SS_{337}	—	September 20, 2008	Kitt Peak	Spacewatch	·	1.0 km	MPC · JPL
777114	2008 SL_{342}	—	September 22, 2008	Mount Lemmon	Mount Lemmon Survey	·	1.7 km	MPC · JPL
777115	2008 SE_{343}	—	September 23, 2008	Kitt Peak	Spacewatch	·	1.9 km	MPC · JPL
777116	2008 SK_{344}	—	September 29, 2008	Mount Lemmon	Mount Lemmon Survey	·	1.5 km	MPC · JPL
777117	2008 SR_{344}	—	September 23, 2008	Kitt Peak	Spacewatch	·	1.0 km	MPC · JPL
777118	2008 SD_{345}	—	September 25, 2008	Kitt Peak	Spacewatch	·	1.3 km	MPC · JPL
777119	2008 SP_{347}	—	September 23, 2008	Kitt Peak	Spacewatch	·	670 m	MPC · JPL
777120	2008 SP_{349}	—	September 28, 2008	Mount Lemmon	Mount Lemmon Survey	·	1.3 km	MPC · JPL
777121	2008 SJ_{350}	—	September 28, 2008	Mount Lemmon	Mount Lemmon Survey	·	1.4 km	MPC · JPL
777122	2008 SM_{350}	—	September 23, 2008	Mount Lemmon	Mount Lemmon Survey	KOR	1.0 km	MPC · JPL
777123	2008 SV_{357}	—	September 19, 2008	Kitt Peak	Spacewatch	(5)	880 m	MPC · JPL
777124	2008 SQ_{359}	—	September 29, 2008	Mount Lemmon	Mount Lemmon Survey	EOS	1.4 km	MPC · JPL
777125	2008 SN_{363}	—	September 23, 2008	Mount Lemmon	Mount Lemmon Survey	·	1.3 km	MPC · JPL
777126	2008 ST_{363}	—	September 25, 2008	Kitt Peak	Spacewatch	·	1.4 km	MPC · JPL
777127	2008 SE_{365}	—	September 29, 2008	Mauna Kea	P. A. Wiegert	·	2.0 km	MPC · JPL
777128	2008 SF_{365}	—	September 22, 2008	Kitt Peak	Spacewatch	·	1.6 km	MPC · JPL
777129	2008 TE_{11}	—	September 23, 2008	Mount Lemmon	Mount Lemmon Survey	·	1.5 km	MPC · JPL
777130	2008 TJ_{13}	—	October 1, 2003	Kitt Peak	Spacewatch	·	1.4 km	MPC · JPL
777131	2008 TH_{16}	—	October 1, 2008	Mount Lemmon	Mount Lemmon Survey	AGN	820 m	MPC · JPL
777132	2008 TT_{16}	—	October 1, 2008	Kitt Peak	Spacewatch	KOR	950 m	MPC · JPL
777133	2008 TJ_{34}	—	October 1, 2008	Kitt Peak	Spacewatch	·	1.6 km	MPC · JPL
777134	2008 TZ_{34}	—	October 1, 2008	Mount Lemmon	Mount Lemmon Survey	·	830 m	MPC · JPL
777135	2008 TQ_{45}	—	October 1, 2008	Mount Lemmon	Mount Lemmon Survey	KOR	980 m	MPC · JPL
777136	2008 TZ_{47}	—	September 24, 2008	Mount Lemmon	Mount Lemmon Survey	·	1.7 km	MPC · JPL
777137	2008 TP_{55}	—	October 2, 2008	Kitt Peak	Spacewatch	·	1.0 km	MPC · JPL
777138	2008 TY_{60}	—	October 2, 2008	Kitt Peak	Spacewatch	(1118)	2.4 km	MPC · JPL
777139	2008 TJ_{67}	—	October 2, 2008	Kitt Peak	Spacewatch	·	2.0 km	MPC · JPL
777140	2008 TH_{76}	—	October 2, 2008	Mount Lemmon	Mount Lemmon Survey	L4	6.1 km	MPC · JPL
777141	2008 TS_{76}	—	October 2, 2008	Mount Lemmon	Mount Lemmon Survey	L4	6.5 km	MPC · JPL
777142	2008 TW_{78}	—	October 2, 2008	Mount Lemmon	Mount Lemmon Survey	·	1.4 km	MPC · JPL
777143	2008 TV_{81}	—	October 2, 2008	Mount Lemmon	Mount Lemmon Survey	L4	6.0 km	MPC · JPL
777144	2008 TU_{95}	—	September 9, 2008	Kitt Peak	Spacewatch	·	2.8 km	MPC · JPL
777145	2008 TG_{117}	—	October 6, 2008	Mount Lemmon	Mount Lemmon Survey	·	1.5 km	MPC · JPL
777146	2008 TM_{122}	—	September 5, 2008	Kitt Peak	Spacewatch	·	780 m	MPC · JPL
777147	2008 TH_{133}	—	October 8, 2008	Mount Lemmon	Mount Lemmon Survey	·	1.7 km	MPC · JPL
777148	2008 TM_{142}	—	September 23, 2008	Mount Lemmon	Mount Lemmon Survey	VER	2.0 km	MPC · JPL
777149	2008 TL_{147}	—	September 23, 2008	Mount Lemmon	Mount Lemmon Survey	·	1.4 km	MPC · JPL
777150	2008 TD_{156}	—	October 9, 2008	Mount Lemmon	Mount Lemmon Survey	·	1.7 km	MPC · JPL
777151	2008 TW_{164}	—	October 2, 2008	Kitt Peak	Spacewatch	EOS	1.5 km	MPC · JPL
777152	2008 TN_{174}	—	October 6, 2008	Kitt Peak	Spacewatch	·	2.6 km	MPC · JPL
777153	2008 TP_{181}	—	October 1, 2008	Kitt Peak	Spacewatch	·	1.3 km	MPC · JPL
777154	2008 TR_{183}	—	October 2, 2008	Kitt Peak	Spacewatch	·	1.1 km	MPC · JPL
777155	2008 TY_{186}	—	October 8, 2008	Kitt Peak	Spacewatch	·	1.7 km	MPC · JPL
777156	2008 TY_{192}	—	October 9, 2008	Mount Lemmon	Mount Lemmon Survey	·	1.0 km	MPC · JPL
777157	2008 TK_{193}	—	October 8, 2008	Mount Lemmon	Mount Lemmon Survey	·	1.5 km	MPC · JPL
777158	2008 TA_{198}	—	October 31, 2013	Mount Lemmon	Mount Lemmon Survey	·	1.6 km	MPC · JPL
777159	2008 TX_{198}	—	January 18, 2016	Haleakala	Pan-STARRS 1	·	1.5 km	MPC · JPL
777160	2008 TM_{200}	—	December 14, 2015	Haleakala	Pan-STARRS 1	·	2.6 km	MPC · JPL
777161	2008 TC_{201}	—	October 7, 2008	Kitt Peak	Spacewatch	·	1.2 km	MPC · JPL
777162	2008 TF_{201}	—	October 10, 2008	Kitt Peak	Spacewatch	·	1.2 km	MPC · JPL
777163	2008 TJ_{205}	—	April 1, 2016	Haleakala	Pan-STARRS 1	·	1.4 km	MPC · JPL
777164	2008 TO_{205}	—	October 1, 2008	Catalina	CSS	·	2.5 km	MPC · JPL
777165	2008 TM_{206}	—	September 25, 2013	Kitt Peak	Spacewatch	·	1.7 km	MPC · JPL
777166	2008 TU_{207}	—	December 11, 2014	Mount Lemmon	Mount Lemmon Survey	·	1.6 km	MPC · JPL
777167	2008 TK_{208}	—	October 8, 2008	Mount Lemmon	Mount Lemmon Survey	·	1.5 km	MPC · JPL
777168	2008 TB_{215}	—	January 31, 2016	Haleakala	Pan-STARRS 1	EOS	1.3 km	MPC · JPL
777169	2008 TQ_{215}	—	October 7, 2008	Kitt Peak	Spacewatch	·	2.0 km	MPC · JPL
777170	2008 TV_{217}	—	October 2, 2008	Kitt Peak	Spacewatch	L4	5.9 km	MPC · JPL
777171	2008 TR_{218}	—	October 8, 2008	Kitt Peak	Spacewatch	EOS	1.2 km	MPC · JPL
777172	2008 TB_{220}	—	October 3, 2008	Kitt Peak	Spacewatch	·	1.5 km	MPC · JPL
777173	2008 TQ_{221}	—	October 8, 2008	Kitt Peak	Spacewatch	·	1.5 km	MPC · JPL
777174	2008 TB_{223}	—	October 8, 2008	Mount Lemmon	Mount Lemmon Survey	MAR	690 m	MPC · JPL
777175	2008 TR_{225}	—	October 1, 2008	Mount Lemmon	Mount Lemmon Survey	L4 · 006	7.0 km	MPC · JPL
777176	2008 TA_{226}	—	October 10, 2008	Mount Lemmon	Mount Lemmon Survey	·	1.5 km	MPC · JPL
777177	2008 TD_{227}	—	October 10, 2008	Mount Lemmon	Mount Lemmon Survey	·	1.2 km	MPC · JPL
777178	2008 TF_{227}	—	October 8, 2008	Mount Lemmon	Mount Lemmon Survey	·	1.6 km	MPC · JPL
777179	2008 TY_{230}	—	October 1, 2008	Mount Lemmon	Mount Lemmon Survey	L4	6.3 km	MPC · JPL
777180	2008 TC_{234}	—	October 6, 2008	Mount Lemmon	Mount Lemmon Survey	·	1.4 km	MPC · JPL
777181	2008 TL_{234}	—	October 2, 2008	Kitt Peak	Spacewatch	·	1.3 km	MPC · JPL
777182	2008 TA_{236}	—	October 8, 2008	Kitt Peak	Spacewatch	·	1.5 km	MPC · JPL
777183	2008 TJ_{237}	—	October 6, 2008	Mount Lemmon	Mount Lemmon Survey	EOS	1.4 km	MPC · JPL
777184	2008 TW_{237}	—	October 2, 2008	Mount Lemmon	Mount Lemmon Survey	·	1.5 km	MPC · JPL
777185	2008 TY_{237}	—	October 8, 2008	Kitt Peak	Spacewatch	·	1.5 km	MPC · JPL
777186	2008 TA_{238}	—	July 3, 2003	Kitt Peak	Spacewatch	·	1.4 km	MPC · JPL
777187	2008 TH_{238}	—	October 7, 2008	Mount Lemmon	Mount Lemmon Survey	·	1.5 km	MPC · JPL
777188	2008 TX_{238}	—	October 9, 2008	Kitt Peak	Spacewatch	HOF	1.9 km	MPC · JPL
777189	2008 TK_{239}	—	October 9, 2008	Kitt Peak	Spacewatch	·	1.2 km	MPC · JPL
777190	2008 TW_{241}	—	October 8, 2008	Mount Lemmon	Mount Lemmon Survey	·	1.8 km	MPC · JPL
777191	2008 TE_{242}	—	October 2, 2008	Kitt Peak	Spacewatch	·	1.4 km	MPC · JPL
777192	2008 UC_{15}	—	October 19, 2008	Kitt Peak	Spacewatch	·	1.5 km	MPC · JPL
777193	2008 UM_{23}	—	October 10, 2008	Mount Lemmon	Mount Lemmon Survey	·	1.5 km	MPC · JPL
777194	2008 UE_{24}	—	September 23, 2008	Kitt Peak	Spacewatch	·	1.8 km	MPC · JPL
777195	2008 UV_{25}	—	November 30, 2003	Kitt Peak	Spacewatch	·	1.4 km	MPC · JPL
777196	2008 UC_{36}	—	October 20, 2008	Mount Lemmon	Mount Lemmon Survey	L4	6.9 km	MPC · JPL
777197	2008 UE_{44}	—	October 20, 2008	Mount Lemmon	Mount Lemmon Survey	·	2.0 km	MPC · JPL
777198	2008 UC_{45}	—	September 23, 2008	Kitt Peak	Spacewatch	URS	2.3 km	MPC · JPL
777199	2008 UT_{50}	—	April 2, 2011	Kitt Peak	Spacewatch	·	2.2 km	MPC · JPL
777200	2008 UE_{51}	—	October 20, 2008	Kitt Peak	Spacewatch	HOF	1.9 km	MPC · JPL

== 777201–777300 ==
back to top

Designation			Discovery			Properties		Ref
Permanent	Provisional	Named after	Date	Site	Discoverer(s)	Category	Diam.	Ref
777201	2008 UL_{115}	—	October 22, 2008	Kitt Peak	Spacewatch	EOS	1.2 km	MPC · JPL
777202	2008 UQ_{121}	—	October 22, 2008	Kitt Peak	Spacewatch	HNS	790 m	MPC · JPL
777203	2008 UL_{131}	—	October 23, 2008	Kitt Peak	Spacewatch	EUN	800 m	MPC · JPL
777204	2008 UE_{140}	—	October 23, 2008	Kitt Peak	Spacewatch	·	1.3 km	MPC · JPL
777205	2008 UF_{141}	—	October 23, 2008	Kitt Peak	Spacewatch	·	2.2 km	MPC · JPL
777206	2008 UO_{141}	—	October 23, 2008	Kitt Peak	Spacewatch	·	1.7 km	MPC · JPL
777207	2008 UO_{145}	—	October 23, 2008	Kitt Peak	Spacewatch	MAR	570 m	MPC · JPL
777208	2008 UN_{146}	—	October 23, 2008	Kitt Peak	Spacewatch	·	1.7 km	MPC · JPL
777209	2008 UM_{152}	—	October 23, 2008	Mount Lemmon	Mount Lemmon Survey	·	940 m	MPC · JPL
777210	2008 UD_{167}	—	October 24, 2008	Kitt Peak	Spacewatch	·	2.2 km	MPC · JPL
777211	2008 UU_{170}	—	October 24, 2008	Kitt Peak	Spacewatch	·	1.6 km	MPC · JPL
777212	2008 UF_{183}	—	October 24, 2008	Mount Lemmon	Mount Lemmon Survey	·	1.3 km	MPC · JPL
777213	2008 UZ_{189}	—	September 3, 2008	Kitt Peak	Spacewatch	·	1.6 km	MPC · JPL
777214	2008 UR_{190}	—	October 25, 2008	Kitt Peak	Spacewatch	·	1.1 km	MPC · JPL
777215	2008 UO_{191}	—	October 25, 2008	Mount Lemmon	Mount Lemmon Survey	·	860 m	MPC · JPL
777216	2008 UK_{194}	—	October 26, 2008	Kitt Peak	Spacewatch	EUN	880 m	MPC · JPL
777217	2008 UT_{210}	—	October 23, 2008	Kitt Peak	Spacewatch	·	1.5 km	MPC · JPL
777218	2008 UC_{211}	—	October 23, 2008	Kitt Peak	Spacewatch	·	2.5 km	MPC · JPL
777219	2008 UY_{217}	—	October 25, 2008	Kitt Peak	Spacewatch	EOS	1.0 km	MPC · JPL
777220	2008 UP_{219}	—	October 2, 2008	Mount Lemmon	Mount Lemmon Survey	·	1.3 km	MPC · JPL
777221	2008 UR_{224}	—	November 21, 2003	Kitt Peak	Spacewatch	·	1.6 km	MPC · JPL
777222	2008 UV_{234}	—	September 23, 2008	Kitt Peak	Spacewatch	·	1.6 km	MPC · JPL
777223	2008 UR_{235}	—	October 26, 2008	Mount Lemmon	Mount Lemmon Survey	EOS	1.4 km	MPC · JPL
777224	2008 UF_{245}	—	October 26, 2008	Kitt Peak	Spacewatch	·	1 km	MPC · JPL
777225	2008 UY_{254}	—	October 27, 2008	Kitt Peak	Spacewatch	·	1.1 km	MPC · JPL
777226	2008 UL_{264}	—	October 28, 2008	Kitt Peak	Spacewatch	WIT	790 m	MPC · JPL
777227	2008 UZ_{264}	—	October 28, 2008	Kitt Peak	Spacewatch	ADE	1.3 km	MPC · JPL
777228	2008 UN_{266}	—	October 9, 2008	Kitt Peak	Spacewatch	·	1.2 km	MPC · JPL
777229	2008 UU_{269}	—	October 28, 2008	Kitt Peak	Spacewatch	·	1.8 km	MPC · JPL
777230	2008 UR_{275}	—	October 28, 2008	Mount Lemmon	Mount Lemmon Survey	KOR	960 m	MPC · JPL
777231	2008 UL_{288}	—	October 28, 2008	Mount Lemmon	Mount Lemmon Survey	·	1.7 km	MPC · JPL
777232	2008 UJ_{293}	—	October 9, 2008	Kitt Peak	Spacewatch	·	2.3 km	MPC · JPL
777233	2008 UR_{295}	—	October 21, 2008	Kitt Peak	Spacewatch	·	950 m	MPC · JPL
777234	2008 UX_{304}	—	October 6, 2008	Mount Lemmon	Mount Lemmon Survey	BRA	1.0 km	MPC · JPL
777235	2008 UU_{311}	—	October 22, 2008	Kitt Peak	Spacewatch	EMA	2.4 km	MPC · JPL
777236	2008 UN_{312}	—	October 30, 2008	Kitt Peak	Spacewatch	·	1.6 km	MPC · JPL
777237	2008 UW_{312}	—	October 30, 2008	Kitt Peak	Spacewatch	·	970 m	MPC · JPL
777238	2008 UD_{318}	—	October 31, 2008	Mount Lemmon	Mount Lemmon Survey	·	2.0 km	MPC · JPL
777239	2008 UX_{325}	—	October 31, 2008	Catalina	CSS	·	1.3 km	MPC · JPL
777240	2008 UM_{339}	—	October 23, 2008	Kitt Peak	Spacewatch	·	1.0 km	MPC · JPL
777241	2008 UY_{343}	—	October 25, 2008	Kitt Peak	Spacewatch	(5)	800 m	MPC · JPL
777242	2008 UE_{349}	—	October 27, 2008	Mount Lemmon	Mount Lemmon Survey	·	1.9 km	MPC · JPL
777243	2008 UB_{350}	—	October 30, 2008	Kitt Peak	Spacewatch	·	1.3 km	MPC · JPL
777244	2008 UT_{361}	—	September 23, 2008	Catalina	CSS	·	1.2 km	MPC · JPL
777245	2008 UB_{369}	—	September 14, 2007	Kitt Peak	Spacewatch	3:2 · SHU	3.9 km	MPC · JPL
777246	2008 UR_{377}	—	February 5, 2011	Haleakala	Pan-STARRS 1	·	1.7 km	MPC · JPL
777247	2008 UC_{381}	—	March 15, 2015	Haleakala	Pan-STARRS 1	TIN	950 m	MPC · JPL
777248	2008 UT_{382}	—	April 2, 2016	Haleakala	Pan-STARRS 1	·	1.3 km	MPC · JPL
777249	2008 UN_{383}	—	November 21, 2014	Haleakala	Pan-STARRS 1	·	2.1 km	MPC · JPL
777250	2008 UA_{391}	—	December 21, 2014	Haleakala	Pan-STARRS 1	·	1.7 km	MPC · JPL
777251	2008 UJ_{391}	—	September 2, 2013	Mount Lemmon	Mount Lemmon Survey	·	2.0 km	MPC · JPL
777252	2008 UK_{392}	—	September 1, 2013	Mount Lemmon	Mount Lemmon Survey	·	1.6 km	MPC · JPL
777253	2008 UV_{392}	—	November 28, 2013	Mount Lemmon	Mount Lemmon Survey	·	1.5 km	MPC · JPL
777254	2008 UY_{393}	—	October 5, 2013	Haleakala	Pan-STARRS 1	·	1.7 km	MPC · JPL
777255	2008 UZ_{396}	—	January 20, 2015	Haleakala	Pan-STARRS 1	·	1.4 km	MPC · JPL
777256	2008 UA_{398}	—	November 1, 2014	Calar Alto	S. Mottola, S. Hellmich	EOS	1.3 km	MPC · JPL
777257	2008 UP_{398}	—	June 20, 2013	Haleakala	Pan-STARRS 1	·	2.1 km	MPC · JPL
777258	2008 UX_{398}	—	February 9, 2016	Haleakala	Pan-STARRS 1	·	2.3 km	MPC · JPL
777259	2008 UL_{399}	—	October 24, 2008	Kitt Peak	Spacewatch	·	1.3 km	MPC · JPL
777260	2008 UK_{400}	—	October 27, 2008	Mount Lemmon	Mount Lemmon Survey	·	2.0 km	MPC · JPL
777261	2008 UW_{400}	—	October 27, 2008	Kitt Peak	Spacewatch	·	2.0 km	MPC · JPL
777262	2008 UB_{401}	—	October 27, 2008	Mount Lemmon	Mount Lemmon Survey	·	670 m	MPC · JPL
777263	2008 UM_{401}	—	July 8, 2018	Haleakala	Pan-STARRS 1	·	2.0 km	MPC · JPL
777264	2008 UT_{401}	—	September 14, 2013	Mount Lemmon	Mount Lemmon Survey	·	1.3 km	MPC · JPL
777265	2008 UL_{402}	—	October 26, 2008	Kitt Peak	Spacewatch	·	1.2 km	MPC · JPL
777266	2008 UW_{403}	—	October 29, 2008	Kitt Peak	Spacewatch	·	2.1 km	MPC · JPL
777267	2008 UX_{403}	—	October 26, 2008	Mount Lemmon	Mount Lemmon Survey	·	2.3 km	MPC · JPL
777268	2008 UU_{407}	—	September 30, 2003	Kitt Peak	Spacewatch	AGN	930 m	MPC · JPL
777269	2008 UW_{407}	—	October 29, 2008	Kitt Peak	Spacewatch	KOR	1.1 km	MPC · JPL
777270	2008 UD_{408}	—	October 29, 2008	Kitt Peak	Spacewatch	·	1.0 km	MPC · JPL
777271	2008 UM_{410}	—	October 30, 2008	Kitt Peak	Spacewatch	·	790 m	MPC · JPL
777272	2008 UY_{412}	—	October 26, 2008	Kitt Peak	Spacewatch	·	2.0 km	MPC · JPL
777273	2008 UH_{413}	—	October 30, 2008	Kitt Peak	Spacewatch	·	1.5 km	MPC · JPL
777274	2008 UM_{413}	—	October 24, 2008	Kitt Peak	Spacewatch	·	2.2 km	MPC · JPL
777275	2008 UM_{414}	—	October 23, 2008	Mount Lemmon	Mount Lemmon Survey	·	1.7 km	MPC · JPL
777276	2008 UB_{415}	—	October 29, 2008	Kitt Peak	Spacewatch	NEM	1.7 km	MPC · JPL
777277	2008 UR_{417}	—	October 30, 2008	Kitt Peak	Spacewatch	·	1.4 km	MPC · JPL
777278	2008 UT_{418}	—	October 24, 2008	Kitt Peak	Spacewatch	·	1.5 km	MPC · JPL
777279	2008 UV_{419}	—	October 20, 2008	Mount Lemmon	Mount Lemmon Survey	·	1.6 km	MPC · JPL
777280	2008 UZ_{423}	—	October 17, 2008	Kitt Peak	Spacewatch	·	1.6 km	MPC · JPL
777281	2008 UD_{426}	—	October 20, 2008	Kitt Peak	Spacewatch	·	1.7 km	MPC · JPL
777282	2008 UD_{427}	—	October 19, 2008	Kitt Peak	Spacewatch	KOR	920 m	MPC · JPL
777283	2008 UE_{428}	—	October 17, 2008	Kitt Peak	Spacewatch	·	1.3 km	MPC · JPL
777284	2008 UH_{428}	—	October 26, 2008	Kitt Peak	Spacewatch	·	2.0 km	MPC · JPL
777285	2008 VZ_{11}	—	October 6, 2008	Mount Lemmon	Mount Lemmon Survey	·	2.2 km	MPC · JPL
777286	2008 VM_{17}	—	October 20, 2008	Kitt Peak	Spacewatch	·	940 m	MPC · JPL
777287	2008 VS_{18}	—	November 1, 2008	Kitt Peak	Spacewatch	·	720 m	MPC · JPL
777288	2008 VK_{24}	—	November 1, 2008	Kitt Peak	Spacewatch	·	850 m	MPC · JPL
777289	2008 VG_{26}	—	October 1, 2008	Mount Lemmon	Mount Lemmon Survey	·	1.5 km	MPC · JPL
777290	2008 VJ_{31}	—	November 2, 2008	Mount Lemmon	Mount Lemmon Survey	EOS	1.2 km	MPC · JPL
777291	2008 VO_{43}	—	November 3, 2008	Kitt Peak	Spacewatch	·	2.2 km	MPC · JPL
777292	2008 VC_{46}	—	November 3, 2008	Mount Lemmon	Mount Lemmon Survey	HNS	710 m	MPC · JPL
777293	2008 VO_{54}	—	September 26, 2008	Kitt Peak	Spacewatch	·	2.0 km	MPC · JPL
777294	2008 VQ_{56}	—	November 6, 2008	Mount Lemmon	Mount Lemmon Survey	·	1.3 km	MPC · JPL
777295	2008 VG_{60}	—	November 7, 2008	Mount Lemmon	Mount Lemmon Survey	·	960 m	MPC · JPL
777296	2008 VK_{66}	—	November 2, 2008	Mount Lemmon	Mount Lemmon Survey	·	2.3 km	MPC · JPL
777297	2008 VC_{70}	—	November 6, 2008	Kitt Peak	Spacewatch	·	1.8 km	MPC · JPL
777298	2008 VD_{73}	—	November 1, 2008	Kitt Peak	Spacewatch	EOS	1.4 km	MPC · JPL
777299	2008 VC_{74}	—	November 7, 2008	Mount Lemmon	Mount Lemmon Survey	·	1.1 km	MPC · JPL
777300	2008 VV_{81}	—	November 1, 2008	Mount Lemmon	Mount Lemmon Survey	·	1.2 km	MPC · JPL

== 777301–777400 ==
back to top

Designation			Discovery			Properties		Ref
Permanent	Provisional	Named after	Date	Site	Discoverer(s)	Category	Diam.	Ref
777301	2008 VT_{85}	—	September 4, 2003	Kitt Peak	Spacewatch	AEO	900 m	MPC · JPL
777302	2008 VN_{86}	—	October 17, 2012	Mount Lemmon	Mount Lemmon Survey	·	850 m	MPC · JPL
777303	2008 VL_{87}	—	February 20, 2014	Haleakala	Pan-STARRS 1	·	930 m	MPC · JPL
777304	2008 VH_{91}	—	February 3, 2016	Haleakala	Pan-STARRS 1	·	2.2 km	MPC · JPL
777305	2008 VE_{93}	—	November 1, 2008	Mount Lemmon	Mount Lemmon Survey	·	1.6 km	MPC · JPL
777306	2008 VF_{93}	—	August 15, 2013	Haleakala	Pan-STARRS 1	·	2.3 km	MPC · JPL
777307	2008 VA_{97}	—	November 27, 2013	Haleakala	Pan-STARRS 1	KOR	1.1 km	MPC · JPL
777308	2008 VE_{97}	—	November 2, 2008	Mount Lemmon	Mount Lemmon Survey	·	1.9 km	MPC · JPL
777309	2008 VT_{97}	—	November 7, 2008	Mount Lemmon	Mount Lemmon Survey	·	1.4 km	MPC · JPL
777310	2008 VW_{98}	—	November 7, 2008	Kitt Peak	Spacewatch	T_{j} (2.96) · 3:2	3.5 km	MPC · JPL
777311	2008 VT_{99}	—	November 1, 2008	Mount Lemmon	Mount Lemmon Survey	·	850 m	MPC · JPL
777312	2008 VV_{99}	—	November 6, 2008	Mount Lemmon	Mount Lemmon Survey	·	1.3 km	MPC · JPL
777313	2008 VA_{100}	—	November 9, 2008	Mount Lemmon	Mount Lemmon Survey	EOS	1.2 km	MPC · JPL
777314	2008 VE_{101}	—	November 1, 2008	Mount Lemmon	Mount Lemmon Survey	·	1.0 km	MPC · JPL
777315	2008 VG_{102}	—	November 7, 2008	Mount Lemmon	Mount Lemmon Survey	·	2.4 km	MPC · JPL
777316	2008 VN_{102}	—	November 1, 2008	Mount Lemmon	Mount Lemmon Survey	·	1.6 km	MPC · JPL
777317	2008 VD_{103}	—	November 7, 2008	Mount Lemmon	Mount Lemmon Survey	·	710 m	MPC · JPL
777318	2008 VH_{106}	—	November 8, 2008	Mount Lemmon	Mount Lemmon Survey	·	1.3 km	MPC · JPL
777319	2008 VT_{107}	—	November 1, 2008	Mount Lemmon	Mount Lemmon Survey	3:2 · SHU	3.7 km	MPC · JPL
777320	2008 VK_{109}	—	November 1, 2008	Mount Lemmon	Mount Lemmon Survey	·	1.0 km	MPC · JPL
777321	2008 VC_{110}	—	November 8, 2008	Mount Lemmon	Mount Lemmon Survey	EOS	1.1 km	MPC · JPL
777322	2008 VH_{111}	—	November 6, 2008	Kitt Peak	Spacewatch	·	1.5 km	MPC · JPL
777323	2008 WE_{1}	—	October 8, 2008	Mount Lemmon	Mount Lemmon Survey	·	1.4 km	MPC · JPL
777324	2008 WS_{7}	—	April 2, 2005	Mount Lemmon	Mount Lemmon Survey	·	1.7 km	MPC · JPL
777325	2008 WG_{18}	—	November 7, 2008	Kitt Peak	Spacewatch	EOS	1.1 km	MPC · JPL
777326	2008 WB_{21}	—	November 17, 2008	Kitt Peak	Spacewatch	·	1.3 km	MPC · JPL
777327	2008 WE_{22}	—	September 23, 2008	Kitt Peak	Spacewatch	·	1.3 km	MPC · JPL
777328	2008 WS_{25}	—	October 6, 2008	Mount Lemmon	Mount Lemmon Survey	·	1.3 km	MPC · JPL
777329	2008 WV_{37}	—	November 17, 2008	Kitt Peak	Spacewatch	·	1.8 km	MPC · JPL
777330	2008 WJ_{39}	—	November 7, 2008	Mount Lemmon	Mount Lemmon Survey	·	1.3 km	MPC · JPL
777331	2008 WA_{42}	—	November 17, 2008	Kitt Peak	Spacewatch	·	1.3 km	MPC · JPL
777332	2008 WS_{42}	—	October 31, 2008	Kitt Peak	Spacewatch	·	2.6 km	MPC · JPL
777333	2008 WH_{44}	—	November 17, 2008	Kitt Peak	Spacewatch	·	2.2 km	MPC · JPL
777334	2008 WR_{44}	—	November 8, 2008	Kitt Peak	Spacewatch	·	1.3 km	MPC · JPL
777335	2008 WP_{53}	—	October 28, 2008	Kitt Peak	Spacewatch	·	1.4 km	MPC · JPL
777336	2008 WA_{56}	—	May 1, 2006	Mauna Kea	P. A. Wiegert	·	1.2 km	MPC · JPL
777337	2008 WA_{63}	—	October 10, 2008	Mount Lemmon	Mount Lemmon Survey	·	2.5 km	MPC · JPL
777338	2008 WY_{64}	—	September 24, 2008	Mount Lemmon	Mount Lemmon Survey	·	1.9 km	MPC · JPL
777339	2008 WP_{78}	—	November 20, 2008	Mount Lemmon	Mount Lemmon Survey	·	1.4 km	MPC · JPL
777340	2008 WB_{79}	—	November 20, 2008	Kitt Peak	Spacewatch	·	1.0 km	MPC · JPL
777341	2008 WX_{82}	—	November 20, 2008	Kitt Peak	Spacewatch	·	1.7 km	MPC · JPL
777342	2008 WA_{89}	—	November 21, 2008	Kitt Peak	Spacewatch	·	1.5 km	MPC · JPL
777343	2008 WW_{89}	—	October 31, 2008	Mount Lemmon	Mount Lemmon Survey	·	2.6 km	MPC · JPL
777344	2008 WP_{117}	—	October 22, 2008	Kitt Peak	Spacewatch	·	2.0 km	MPC · JPL
777345	2008 WT_{121}	—	November 30, 2008	Kitt Peak	Spacewatch	·	2.0 km	MPC · JPL
777346	2008 WY_{121}	—	November 30, 2008	Kitt Peak	Spacewatch	·	1.6 km	MPC · JPL
777347	2008 WO_{123}	—	November 4, 2008	Kitt Peak	Spacewatch	·	1.5 km	MPC · JPL
777348	2008 WA_{138}	—	November 30, 2008	Socorro	LINEAR	·	1.5 km	MPC · JPL
777349	2008 WL_{146}	—	November 20, 2008	Kitt Peak	Spacewatch	·	1.5 km	MPC · JPL
777350	2008 WC_{147}	—	October 6, 2016	Mount Lemmon	Mount Lemmon Survey	·	1.1 km	MPC · JPL
777351	2008 WE_{147}	—	January 20, 2015	Haleakala	Pan-STARRS 1	KOR	1.0 km	MPC · JPL
777352	2008 WE_{148}	—	May 30, 2011	Haleakala	Pan-STARRS 1	·	1.7 km	MPC · JPL
777353	2008 WH_{149}	—	November 20, 2008	Kitt Peak	Spacewatch	·	2.6 km	MPC · JPL
777354	2008 WC_{151}	—	October 31, 2008	Kitt Peak	Spacewatch	·	2.2 km	MPC · JPL
777355	2008 WL_{151}	—	November 20, 2008	Mount Lemmon	Mount Lemmon Survey	·	1.0 km	MPC · JPL
777356	2008 WE_{154}	—	February 5, 2016	Haleakala	Pan-STARRS 1	·	2.4 km	MPC · JPL
777357	2008 WF_{154}	—	November 17, 2014	Haleakala	Pan-STARRS 1	EOS	1.7 km	MPC · JPL
777358	2008 WO_{155}	—	November 20, 2008	Mount Lemmon	Mount Lemmon Survey	·	1.2 km	MPC · JPL
777359	2008 WQ_{155}	—	November 21, 2008	Kitt Peak	Spacewatch	·	1.3 km	MPC · JPL
777360	2008 WR_{155}	—	November 21, 2008	Mount Lemmon	Mount Lemmon Survey	KOR	970 m	MPC · JPL
777361	2008 WY_{155}	—	February 29, 2016	Haleakala	Pan-STARRS 1	·	2.5 km	MPC · JPL
777362	2008 WG_{156}	—	November 18, 2008	Kitt Peak	Spacewatch	·	1.9 km	MPC · JPL
777363	2008 WS_{156}	—	November 20, 2008	Kitt Peak	Spacewatch	KOR	1.1 km	MPC · JPL
777364	2008 WY_{156}	—	November 20, 2008	Mount Lemmon	Mount Lemmon Survey	·	1.4 km	MPC · JPL
777365	2008 WY_{157}	—	November 18, 2008	Kitt Peak	Spacewatch	·	1.7 km	MPC · JPL
777366	2008 WY_{158}	—	November 20, 2008	Kitt Peak	Spacewatch	·	1.4 km	MPC · JPL
777367	2008 WL_{159}	—	November 22, 2008	Kitt Peak	Spacewatch	EOS	1.1 km	MPC · JPL
777368	2008 WH_{160}	—	November 18, 2008	Kitt Peak	Spacewatch	BRG	1.3 km	MPC · JPL
777369	2008 WL_{160}	—	November 19, 2008	Kitt Peak	Spacewatch	·	730 m	MPC · JPL
777370	2008 WG_{162}	—	September 10, 2007	Mount Lemmon	Mount Lemmon Survey	3:2 · SHU	3.6 km	MPC · JPL
777371	2008 WP_{162}	—	November 21, 2008	Kitt Peak	Spacewatch	·	1.5 km	MPC · JPL
777372	2008 WJ_{165}	—	November 18, 2008	Kitt Peak	Spacewatch	·	2.1 km	MPC · JPL
777373	2008 WH_{166}	—	November 19, 2008	Kitt Peak	Spacewatch	EOS	1.5 km	MPC · JPL
777374	2008 WN_{166}	—	November 20, 2008	Kitt Peak	Spacewatch	·	730 m	MPC · JPL
777375	2008 WP_{166}	—	November 20, 2008	Mount Lemmon	Mount Lemmon Survey	EOS	1.1 km	MPC · JPL
777376	2008 WZ_{166}	—	November 20, 2008	Mount Lemmon	Mount Lemmon Survey	·	1.5 km	MPC · JPL
777377	2008 WE_{167}	—	November 30, 2008	Kitt Peak	Spacewatch	·	1.9 km	MPC · JPL
777378	2008 WY_{167}	—	November 18, 2008	Kitt Peak	Spacewatch	3:2	3.5 km	MPC · JPL
777379	2008 WH_{168}	—	November 20, 2008	Kitt Peak	Spacewatch	·	1.2 km	MPC · JPL
777380	2008 WA_{169}	—	November 20, 2008	Kitt Peak	Spacewatch	·	1.8 km	MPC · JPL
777381	2008 WG_{169}	—	November 24, 2008	Kitt Peak	Spacewatch	·	920 m	MPC · JPL
777382	2008 XZ_{10}	—	November 7, 2008	Mount Lemmon	Mount Lemmon Survey	·	1.5 km	MPC · JPL
777383	2008 XY_{16}	—	December 1, 2008	Kitt Peak	Spacewatch	·	1.2 km	MPC · JPL
777384	2008 XB_{17}	—	December 1, 2008	Kitt Peak	Spacewatch	·	1.3 km	MPC · JPL
777385	2008 XL_{29}	—	December 5, 2008	Mount Lemmon	Mount Lemmon Survey	·	770 m	MPC · JPL
777386	2008 XR_{31}	—	November 19, 2008	Kitt Peak	Spacewatch	·	780 m	MPC · JPL
777387	2008 XT_{33}	—	December 2, 2008	Kitt Peak	Spacewatch	·	1.5 km	MPC · JPL
777388	2008 XV_{34}	—	December 2, 2008	Kitt Peak	Spacewatch	EOS	1.2 km	MPC · JPL
777389	2008 XA_{36}	—	December 2, 2008	Kitt Peak	Spacewatch	·	1.1 km	MPC · JPL
777390	2008 XH_{45}	—	December 3, 2008	Kitt Peak	Spacewatch	·	1.4 km	MPC · JPL
777391	2008 XP_{46}	—	November 20, 2008	Mount Lemmon	Mount Lemmon Survey	EOS	1.3 km	MPC · JPL
777392	2008 XA_{57}	—	November 19, 2008	Kitt Peak	Spacewatch	·	1.3 km	MPC · JPL
777393	2008 XK_{58}	—	September 21, 2012	Catalina	CSS	·	1.2 km	MPC · JPL
777394	2008 XL_{59}	—	December 4, 2008	Kitt Peak	Spacewatch	·	1.4 km	MPC · JPL
777395	2008 XY_{59}	—	November 26, 2014	Haleakala	Pan-STARRS 1	·	3.2 km	MPC · JPL
777396	2008 XG_{60}	—	December 4, 2008	Mount Lemmon	Mount Lemmon Survey	·	1.5 km	MPC · JPL
777397	2008 XC_{61}	—	December 3, 2008	Mount Lemmon	Mount Lemmon Survey	MAR	660 m	MPC · JPL
777398	2008 XW_{67}	—	December 1, 2008	Mount Lemmon	Mount Lemmon Survey	TEL	940 m	MPC · JPL
777399	2008 XB_{68}	—	December 4, 2008	Kitt Peak	Spacewatch	·	2.0 km	MPC · JPL
777400	2008 XC_{68}	—	December 5, 2008	Kitt Peak	Spacewatch	·	2.5 km	MPC · JPL

== 777401–777500 ==
back to top

Designation			Discovery			Properties		Ref
Permanent	Provisional	Named after	Date	Site	Discoverer(s)	Category	Diam.	Ref
777401	2008 XL_{69}	—	December 1, 2008	Kitt Peak	Spacewatch	HNS	1 km	MPC · JPL
777402	2008 XW_{69}	—	December 6, 2008	Kitt Peak	Spacewatch	·	2.1 km	MPC · JPL
777403	2008 XE_{70}	—	December 4, 2008	Mount Lemmon	Mount Lemmon Survey	KOR	1.2 km	MPC · JPL
777404	2008 XU_{70}	—	December 4, 2008	Kitt Peak	Spacewatch	·	1.3 km	MPC · JPL
777405	2008 YP_{3}	—	December 21, 2008	Calar Alto	F. Hormuth	·	800 m	MPC · JPL
777406	2008 YH_{44}	—	December 29, 2008	Mount Lemmon	Mount Lemmon Survey	·	1.5 km	MPC · JPL
777407	2008 YO_{46}	—	December 29, 2008	Mount Lemmon	Mount Lemmon Survey	·	1.6 km	MPC · JPL
777408	2008 YE_{56}	—	December 30, 2008	Kitt Peak	Spacewatch	·	1.8 km	MPC · JPL
777409	2008 YC_{57}	—	December 30, 2008	Kitt Peak	Spacewatch	·	1.6 km	MPC · JPL
777410	2008 YE_{57}	—	December 30, 2008	Kitt Peak	Spacewatch	·	850 m	MPC · JPL
777411	2008 YK_{58}	—	December 30, 2008	Kitt Peak	Spacewatch	EOS	1.2 km	MPC · JPL
777412	2008 YX_{58}	—	December 30, 2008	Kitt Peak	Spacewatch	·	1.5 km	MPC · JPL
777413	2008 YJ_{59}	—	December 4, 2008	Mount Lemmon	Mount Lemmon Survey	EUN	900 m	MPC · JPL
777414	2008 YV_{63}	—	September 27, 2003	Kitt Peak	Spacewatch	·	940 m	MPC · JPL
777415	2008 YJ_{72}	—	December 30, 2008	Kitt Peak	Spacewatch	·	2.2 km	MPC · JPL
777416	2008 YH_{74}	—	December 30, 2008	Kitt Peak	Spacewatch	(5)	1.0 km	MPC · JPL
777417	2008 YM_{74}	—	December 30, 2008	Kitt Peak	Spacewatch	·	1.4 km	MPC · JPL
777418	2008 YV_{75}	—	December 30, 2008	Mount Lemmon	Mount Lemmon Survey	EOS	1.3 km	MPC · JPL
777419	2008 YH_{76}	—	December 30, 2008	Mount Lemmon	Mount Lemmon Survey	·	2.3 km	MPC · JPL
777420	2008 YA_{89}	—	December 21, 2008	Kitt Peak	Spacewatch	(5)	930 m	MPC · JPL
777421	2008 YB_{91}	—	December 29, 2008	Kitt Peak	Spacewatch	·	1.0 km	MPC · JPL
777422	2008 YQ_{92}	—	December 21, 2008	Kitt Peak	Spacewatch	·	2.1 km	MPC · JPL
777423	2008 YT_{93}	—	December 21, 2008	Mount Lemmon	Mount Lemmon Survey	THM	1.5 km	MPC · JPL
777424	2008 YA_{94}	—	December 29, 2008	Kitt Peak	Spacewatch	·	1.4 km	MPC · JPL
777425	2008 YJ_{102}	—	December 29, 2008	Kitt Peak	Spacewatch	THM	1.6 km	MPC · JPL
777426	2008 YY_{108}	—	December 29, 2008	Kitt Peak	Spacewatch	·	2.0 km	MPC · JPL
777427	2008 YA_{110}	—	December 30, 2008	Mount Lemmon	Mount Lemmon Survey	·	1.1 km	MPC · JPL
777428	2008 YM_{118}	—	December 21, 2008	Kitt Peak	Spacewatch	·	2.4 km	MPC · JPL
777429	2008 YD_{131}	—	December 28, 2019	Haleakala	Pan-STARRS 1	TEL	900 m	MPC · JPL
777430	2008 YO_{140}	—	December 30, 2008	Mount Lemmon	Mount Lemmon Survey	·	1.9 km	MPC · JPL
777431	2008 YJ_{141}	—	December 30, 2008	Kitt Peak	Spacewatch	·	1.4 km	MPC · JPL
777432	2008 YL_{143}	—	December 21, 2008	Mount Lemmon	Mount Lemmon Survey	ADE	1.7 km	MPC · JPL
777433	2008 YD_{144}	—	December 21, 2008	Mount Lemmon	Mount Lemmon Survey	·	1.8 km	MPC · JPL
777434	2008 YK_{145}	—	December 22, 2008	Mount Lemmon	Mount Lemmon Survey	LIX	2.7 km	MPC · JPL
777435	2008 YW_{147}	—	December 31, 2008	Kitt Peak	Spacewatch	·	1.8 km	MPC · JPL
777436	2008 YD_{148}	—	December 31, 2008	Kitt Peak	Spacewatch	·	2.1 km	MPC · JPL
777437	2008 YN_{163}	—	December 30, 2008	Kitt Peak	Spacewatch	·	1.3 km	MPC · JPL
777438	2008 YQ_{164}	—	December 26, 2008	Mount Nyukasa	Japan Aerospace Exploration Agency	·	1.3 km	MPC · JPL
777439	2008 YS_{165}	—	December 30, 2008	Mount Lemmon	Mount Lemmon Survey	·	1.9 km	MPC · JPL
777440	2008 YR_{175}	—	December 31, 2008	Kitt Peak	Spacewatch	·	1.7 km	MPC · JPL
777441	2008 YJ_{179}	—	December 1, 2008	Mount Lemmon	Mount Lemmon Survey	·	1.2 km	MPC · JPL
777442	2008 YA_{180}	—	August 14, 2012	Kitt Peak	Spacewatch	EOS	1.4 km	MPC · JPL
777443	2008 YB_{180}	—	December 12, 2012	Mount Lemmon	Mount Lemmon Survey	·	890 m	MPC · JPL
777444	2008 YJ_{182}	—	October 26, 2013	Kitt Peak	Spacewatch	·	1.3 km	MPC · JPL
777445	2008 YW_{182}	—	May 20, 2018	Haleakala	Pan-STARRS 1	·	880 m	MPC · JPL
777446	2008 YY_{183}	—	October 25, 2008	Mount Lemmon	Mount Lemmon Survey	·	1.2 km	MPC · JPL
777447	2008 YG_{184}	—	December 31, 2008	Mount Lemmon	Mount Lemmon Survey	·	1.7 km	MPC · JPL
777448	2008 YW_{185}	—	December 31, 2008	Mount Lemmon	Mount Lemmon Survey	·	860 m	MPC · JPL
777449	2008 YK_{186}	—	December 29, 2014	Haleakala	Pan-STARRS 1	·	2.3 km	MPC · JPL
777450	2008 YP_{187}	—	December 30, 2008	Mount Lemmon	Mount Lemmon Survey	EOS	1.3 km	MPC · JPL
777451	2008 YE_{188}	—	December 31, 2008	Kitt Peak	Spacewatch	·	2.0 km	MPC · JPL
777452	2008 YE_{191}	—	December 29, 2008	Kitt Peak	Spacewatch	·	1.2 km	MPC · JPL
777453	2008 YJ_{191}	—	December 29, 2008	Kitt Peak	Spacewatch	·	770 m	MPC · JPL
777454	2008 YT_{191}	—	December 31, 2008	Kitt Peak	Spacewatch	(5)	830 m	MPC · JPL
777455	2008 YV_{191}	—	December 30, 2008	Kitt Peak	Spacewatch	·	1.1 km	MPC · JPL
777456	2008 YX_{192}	—	December 31, 2008	Kitt Peak	Spacewatch	EOS	1.4 km	MPC · JPL
777457	2008 YH_{193}	—	December 30, 2008	Kitt Peak	Spacewatch	·	1.7 km	MPC · JPL
777458	2008 YN_{193}	—	December 29, 2008	Kitt Peak	Spacewatch	THM	1.5 km	MPC · JPL
777459	2008 YV_{195}	—	December 31, 2008	Kitt Peak	Spacewatch	·	900 m	MPC · JPL
777460	2008 YO_{196}	—	December 22, 2008	Kitt Peak	Spacewatch	·	1.8 km	MPC · JPL
777461	2008 YO_{197}	—	December 21, 2008	Mount Lemmon	Mount Lemmon Survey	EOS	1.3 km	MPC · JPL
777462	2008 YR_{197}	—	December 22, 2008	Kitt Peak	Spacewatch	·	1.9 km	MPC · JPL
777463	2008 YG_{198}	—	December 31, 2008	Kitt Peak	Spacewatch	·	2.4 km	MPC · JPL
777464	2008 YN_{198}	—	December 22, 2008	Kitt Peak	Spacewatch	·	2.1 km	MPC · JPL
777465	2009 AX_{3}	—	January 1, 2009	Mount Lemmon	Mount Lemmon Survey	·	2.1 km	MPC · JPL
777466	2009 AH_{4}	—	January 1, 2009	Kitt Peak	Spacewatch	·	1.8 km	MPC · JPL
777467	2009 AS_{5}	—	January 1, 2009	Kitt Peak	Spacewatch	·	1.4 km	MPC · JPL
777468	2009 AK_{6}	—	March 9, 2005	Kitt Peak	Spacewatch	·	1.4 km	MPC · JPL
777469	2009 AA_{8}	—	January 1, 2009	Mount Lemmon	Mount Lemmon Survey	EOS	1.3 km	MPC · JPL
777470	2009 AM_{12}	—	January 2, 2009	Mount Lemmon	Mount Lemmon Survey	·	1.2 km	MPC · JPL
777471	2009 AN_{17}	—	December 21, 2008	Kitt Peak	Spacewatch	·	1.3 km	MPC · JPL
777472	2009 AQ_{18}	—	December 4, 2008	Mount Lemmon	Mount Lemmon Survey	·	1.9 km	MPC · JPL
777473	2009 AU_{19}	—	January 2, 2009	Mount Lemmon	Mount Lemmon Survey	·	890 m	MPC · JPL
777474	2009 AX_{19}	—	December 22, 2008	Kitt Peak	Spacewatch	·	1.3 km	MPC · JPL
777475	2009 AG_{26}	—	January 2, 2009	Kitt Peak	Spacewatch	·	990 m	MPC · JPL
777476	2009 AT_{34}	—	January 15, 2009	Kitt Peak	Spacewatch	(5)	970 m	MPC · JPL
777477	2009 AT_{38}	—	December 22, 2008	Mount Lemmon	Mount Lemmon Survey	LIX	2.5 km	MPC · JPL
777478	2009 AP_{39}	—	December 29, 2008	Kitt Peak	Spacewatch	·	1.5 km	MPC · JPL
777479	2009 AK_{56}	—	August 14, 2017	Haleakala	Pan-STARRS 1	EOS	1.4 km	MPC · JPL
777480	2009 AV_{56}	—	January 3, 2009	Kitt Peak	Spacewatch	·	1.7 km	MPC · JPL
777481	2009 AK_{57}	—	August 10, 2015	Haleakala	Pan-STARRS 1	·	770 m	MPC · JPL
777482	2009 AP_{57}	—	January 1, 2009	Mount Lemmon	Mount Lemmon Survey	·	1.3 km	MPC · JPL
777483	2009 AA_{59}	—	February 16, 2015	Haleakala	Pan-STARRS 1	·	1.6 km	MPC · JPL
777484	2009 AG_{60}	—	January 1, 2009	Mount Lemmon	Mount Lemmon Survey	·	1.9 km	MPC · JPL
777485	2009 AY_{60}	—	January 2, 2009	Mount Lemmon	Mount Lemmon Survey	·	1.4 km	MPC · JPL
777486	2009 AO_{61}	—	January 3, 2009	Kitt Peak	Spacewatch	·	850 m	MPC · JPL
777487	2009 AW_{61}	—	January 15, 2009	Kitt Peak	Spacewatch	·	1.8 km	MPC · JPL
777488	2009 AR_{62}	—	January 2, 2009	Mount Lemmon	Mount Lemmon Survey	EUN	810 m	MPC · JPL
777489	2009 AX_{63}	—	January 1, 2009	Kitt Peak	Spacewatch	EOS	1.4 km	MPC · JPL
777490	2009 AN_{64}	—	November 30, 2008	Kitt Peak	Spacewatch	·	1.2 km	MPC · JPL
777491	2009 AU_{64}	—	January 1, 2009	Kitt Peak	Spacewatch	EOS	1.4 km	MPC · JPL
777492	2009 AD_{65}	—	January 2, 2009	Kitt Peak	Spacewatch	·	1.7 km	MPC · JPL
777493	2009 AR_{65}	—	January 3, 2009	Mount Lemmon	Mount Lemmon Survey	·	1.5 km	MPC · JPL
777494	2009 AE_{66}	—	January 3, 2009	Mount Lemmon	Mount Lemmon Survey	(5)	670 m	MPC · JPL
777495	2009 BN_{3}	—	January 18, 2009	Socorro	LINEAR	BAR	860 m	MPC · JPL
777496	2009 BA_{15}	—	January 16, 2009	Kitt Peak	Spacewatch	·	1.3 km	MPC · JPL
777497	2009 BT_{15}	—	January 16, 2009	Mount Lemmon	Mount Lemmon Survey	·	1.2 km	MPC · JPL
777498	2009 BC_{22}	—	January 17, 2009	Kitt Peak	Spacewatch	(5)	770 m	MPC · JPL
777499	2009 BU_{29}	—	January 2, 2009	Kitt Peak	Spacewatch	·	1.4 km	MPC · JPL
777500	2009 BB_{36}	—	March 16, 2005	Mount Lemmon	Mount Lemmon Survey	·	990 m	MPC · JPL

== 777501–777600 ==
back to top

Designation			Discovery			Properties		Ref
Permanent	Provisional	Named after	Date	Site	Discoverer(s)	Category	Diam.	Ref
777501	2009 BL_{37}	—	November 1, 2007	Mount Lemmon	Mount Lemmon Survey	THM	1.5 km	MPC · JPL
777502	2009 BM_{37}	—	January 16, 2009	Kitt Peak	Spacewatch	·	1.0 km	MPC · JPL
777503	2009 BE_{40}	—	January 16, 2009	Kitt Peak	Spacewatch	·	1.6 km	MPC · JPL
777504	2009 BX_{40}	—	January 16, 2009	Kitt Peak	Spacewatch	(5)	760 m	MPC · JPL
777505	2009 BY_{40}	—	January 16, 2009	Kitt Peak	Spacewatch	T_{j} (2.99) · (895)	3.4 km	MPC · JPL
777506	2009 BB_{57}	—	January 18, 2009	Kitt Peak	Spacewatch	·	1.4 km	MPC · JPL
777507	2009 BD_{57}	—	January 2, 2009	Kitt Peak	Spacewatch	EOS	1.5 km	MPC · JPL
777508	2009 BO_{61}	—	January 18, 2009	Kitt Peak	Spacewatch	·	870 m	MPC · JPL
777509	2009 BT_{61}	—	January 18, 2009	Mount Lemmon	Mount Lemmon Survey	·	1.7 km	MPC · JPL
777510	2009 BL_{67}	—	January 20, 2009	Kitt Peak	Spacewatch	·	2.5 km	MPC · JPL
777511	2009 BE_{89}	—	January 25, 2009	Kitt Peak	Spacewatch	·	1.3 km	MPC · JPL
777512	2009 BH_{98}	—	December 30, 2008	Mount Lemmon	Mount Lemmon Survey	·	1.5 km	MPC · JPL
777513	2009 BY_{102}	—	January 30, 2009	Mount Lemmon	Mount Lemmon Survey	·	1.4 km	MPC · JPL
777514	2009 BM_{110}	—	January 31, 2009	Mount Lemmon	Mount Lemmon Survey	·	640 m	MPC · JPL
777515	2009 BO_{122}	—	November 7, 2007	Kitt Peak	Spacewatch	·	1.5 km	MPC · JPL
777516	2009 BM_{126}	—	January 29, 2009	Kitt Peak	Spacewatch	·	1.4 km	MPC · JPL
777517	2009 BS_{126}	—	January 29, 2009	Kitt Peak	Spacewatch	·	1.4 km	MPC · JPL
777518	2009 BN_{127}	—	January 15, 2009	Kitt Peak	Spacewatch	·	1.2 km	MPC · JPL
777519	2009 BE_{133}	—	January 29, 2009	Kitt Peak	Spacewatch	EOS	1.5 km	MPC · JPL
777520	2009 BF_{133}	—	January 29, 2009	Kitt Peak	Spacewatch	THM	1.3 km	MPC · JPL
777521	2009 BR_{136}	—	January 29, 2009	Kitt Peak	Spacewatch	·	1.7 km	MPC · JPL
777522	2009 BC_{138}	—	January 29, 2009	Kitt Peak	Spacewatch	·	750 m	MPC · JPL
777523	2009 BD_{138}	—	December 30, 2008	Mount Lemmon	Mount Lemmon Survey	·	1.0 km	MPC · JPL
777524	2009 BR_{145}	—	January 20, 2009	Kitt Peak	Spacewatch	·	1.5 km	MPC · JPL
777525	2009 BY_{147}	—	January 30, 2009	Mount Lemmon	Mount Lemmon Survey	·	1.6 km	MPC · JPL
777526	2009 BL_{149}	—	January 31, 2009	Kitt Peak	Spacewatch	·	2.0 km	MPC · JPL
777527	2009 BP_{155}	—	January 31, 2009	Kitt Peak	Spacewatch	·	1.6 km	MPC · JPL
777528	2009 BA_{156}	—	January 31, 2009	Kitt Peak	Spacewatch	·	1.2 km	MPC · JPL
777529	2009 BB_{156}	—	December 30, 2008	Mount Lemmon	Mount Lemmon Survey	·	1.4 km	MPC · JPL
777530	2009 BL_{156}	—	January 31, 2009	Kitt Peak	Spacewatch	·	2.0 km	MPC · JPL
777531	2009 BS_{161}	—	January 25, 2009	Cerro Burek	I. de la Cueva	·	1.9 km	MPC · JPL
777532	2009 BN_{162}	—	January 30, 2009	Mount Lemmon	Mount Lemmon Survey	·	1.1 km	MPC · JPL
777533	2009 BO_{175}	—	January 29, 2009	Catalina	CSS	·	1.7 km	MPC · JPL
777534	2009 BP_{179}	—	January 16, 2009	Kitt Peak	Spacewatch	THM	1.8 km	MPC · JPL
777535	2009 BW_{183}	—	January 20, 2009	Catalina	CSS	·	1.6 km	MPC · JPL
777536	2009 BD_{193}	—	January 20, 2009	Mount Lemmon	Mount Lemmon Survey	·	1.6 km	MPC · JPL
777537	2009 BD_{195}	—	October 6, 2012	Mount Lemmon	Mount Lemmon Survey	·	2.2 km	MPC · JPL
777538	2009 BV_{196}	—	October 17, 2012	Mount Lemmon	Mount Lemmon Survey	·	1.4 km	MPC · JPL
777539	2009 BB_{197}	—	May 24, 2011	Haleakala	Pan-STARRS 1	·	980 m	MPC · JPL
777540	2009 BT_{197}	—	October 23, 2012	Haleakala	Pan-STARRS 1	·	1.6 km	MPC · JPL
777541	2009 BW_{197}	—	January 19, 2009	Mount Lemmon	Mount Lemmon Survey	·	1.2 km	MPC · JPL
777542	2009 BQ_{200}	—	January 22, 2015	Haleakala	Pan-STARRS 1	·	2.1 km	MPC · JPL
777543	2009 BG_{201}	—	January 23, 2015	Haleakala	Pan-STARRS 1	EOS	1.5 km	MPC · JPL
777544	2009 BY_{201}	—	September 20, 2011	Haleakala	Pan-STARRS 1	HOF	1.8 km	MPC · JPL
777545	2009 BL_{202}	—	January 16, 2009	Kitt Peak	Spacewatch	·	2.0 km	MPC · JPL
777546	2009 BG_{205}	—	January 31, 2009	Mount Lemmon	Mount Lemmon Survey	·	1.0 km	MPC · JPL
777547	2009 BR_{207}	—	January 20, 2009	Kitt Peak	Spacewatch	·	1.3 km	MPC · JPL
777548	2009 BU_{207}	—	January 31, 2009	Mount Lemmon	Mount Lemmon Survey	·	1.9 km	MPC · JPL
777549	2009 BZ_{207}	—	January 20, 2009	Kitt Peak	Spacewatch	·	1.6 km	MPC · JPL
777550	2009 BC_{208}	—	January 17, 2009	Kitt Peak	Spacewatch	·	2.2 km	MPC · JPL
777551	2009 BN_{208}	—	January 31, 2009	Kitt Peak	Spacewatch	·	2.1 km	MPC · JPL
777552	2009 BO_{208}	—	January 18, 2009	Kitt Peak	Spacewatch	·	1.9 km	MPC · JPL
777553	2009 BP_{208}	—	January 20, 2009	Kitt Peak	Spacewatch	EOS	1.4 km	MPC · JPL
777554	2009 BQ_{209}	—	January 18, 2009	Mount Lemmon	Mount Lemmon Survey	·	690 m	MPC · JPL
777555	2009 BY_{209}	—	January 29, 2009	Kitt Peak	Spacewatch	·	2.2 km	MPC · JPL
777556	2009 BF_{210}	—	January 30, 2009	Bergisch Gladbach	W. Bickel	·	1.3 km	MPC · JPL
777557	2009 BS_{210}	—	January 20, 2009	Catalina	CSS	·	1.0 km	MPC · JPL
777558	2009 BU_{210}	—	January 18, 2009	Kitt Peak	Spacewatch	·	800 m	MPC · JPL
777559	2009 BV_{210}	—	January 20, 2009	Kitt Peak	Spacewatch	·	1.8 km	MPC · JPL
777560	2009 BX_{210}	—	January 29, 2009	Mount Lemmon	Mount Lemmon Survey	EOS	1.5 km	MPC · JPL
777561	2009 BB_{211}	—	January 20, 2009	Mount Lemmon	Mount Lemmon Survey	(5)	990 m	MPC · JPL
777562	2009 BD_{211}	—	January 16, 2009	Kitt Peak	Spacewatch	·	830 m	MPC · JPL
777563	2009 BH_{211}	—	January 18, 2009	Kitt Peak	Spacewatch	·	1.2 km	MPC · JPL
777564	2009 BK_{211}	—	January 17, 2009	Kitt Peak	Spacewatch	EOS	1.4 km	MPC · JPL
777565	2009 BD_{212}	—	January 20, 2009	Kitt Peak	Spacewatch	·	1.8 km	MPC · JPL
777566	2009 BK_{212}	—	January 31, 2009	Mount Lemmon	Mount Lemmon Survey	·	1.8 km	MPC · JPL
777567	2009 BN_{212}	—	January 29, 2009	Mount Lemmon	Mount Lemmon Survey	·	2.1 km	MPC · JPL
777568	2009 BS_{213}	—	January 31, 2009	Kitt Peak	Spacewatch	KOR	1.0 km	MPC · JPL
777569	2009 BU_{213}	—	January 29, 2009	Mount Lemmon	Mount Lemmon Survey	·	1.6 km	MPC · JPL
777570	2009 BG_{216}	—	January 25, 2009	Kitt Peak	Spacewatch	·	850 m	MPC · JPL
777571	2009 BW_{216}	—	January 29, 2009	Kitt Peak	Spacewatch	·	1.4 km	MPC · JPL
777572	2009 BU_{217}	—	March 10, 2005	Mount Lemmon	Mount Lemmon Survey	·	1.5 km	MPC · JPL
777573	2009 BZ_{217}	—	January 27, 2009	Piszkéstető	K. Sárneczky	·	2.3 km	MPC · JPL
777574	2009 BG_{218}	—	January 18, 2009	Mount Lemmon	Mount Lemmon Survey	EOS	1.4 km	MPC · JPL
777575	2009 CD_{5}	—	February 12, 2009	Calar Alto	F. Hormuth, Datson, J. C.	3:2	3.5 km	MPC · JPL
777576	2009 CD_{6}	—	February 13, 2009	Calar Alto	F. Hormuth, Datson, J. C.	KOR	950 m	MPC · JPL
777577	2009 CF_{12}	—	February 1, 2009	Kitt Peak	Spacewatch	·	1.9 km	MPC · JPL
777578	2009 CX_{12}	—	January 20, 2009	Mount Lemmon	Mount Lemmon Survey	MAR	760 m	MPC · JPL
777579	2009 CA_{14}	—	February 2, 2009	Mount Lemmon	Mount Lemmon Survey	·	990 m	MPC · JPL
777580	2009 CP_{15}	—	January 20, 2009	Mount Lemmon	Mount Lemmon Survey	·	1.5 km	MPC · JPL
777581	2009 CC_{21}	—	February 1, 2009	Kitt Peak	Spacewatch	·	1.2 km	MPC · JPL
777582	2009 CN_{21}	—	February 1, 2009	Kitt Peak	Spacewatch	·	1.6 km	MPC · JPL
777583	2009 CR_{22}	—	February 1, 2009	Kitt Peak	Spacewatch	·	810 m	MPC · JPL
777584	2009 CX_{25}	—	February 1, 2009	Kitt Peak	Spacewatch	·	1.6 km	MPC · JPL
777585	2009 CO_{27}	—	February 1, 2009	Kitt Peak	Spacewatch	EOS	1.5 km	MPC · JPL
777586	2009 CK_{39}	—	February 1, 2009	Kitt Peak	Spacewatch	·	3.0 km	MPC · JPL
777587	2009 CD_{46}	—	December 29, 2008	Mount Lemmon	Mount Lemmon Survey	EOS	1.3 km	MPC · JPL
777588	2009 CQ_{46}	—	January 18, 2009	Kitt Peak	Spacewatch	·	790 m	MPC · JPL
777589	2009 CE_{47}	—	January 30, 2009	Mount Lemmon	Mount Lemmon Survey	·	1.1 km	MPC · JPL
777590	2009 CA_{49}	—	December 21, 2008	Kitt Peak	Spacewatch	·	1.3 km	MPC · JPL
777591	2009 CL_{57}	—	February 1, 2009	Kitt Peak	Spacewatch	·	2.0 km	MPC · JPL
777592	2009 CU_{57}	—	February 2, 2009	Kitt Peak	Spacewatch	EUN	780 m	MPC · JPL
777593	2009 CM_{58}	—	February 3, 2009	Mount Lemmon	Mount Lemmon Survey	·	2.2 km	MPC · JPL
777594	2009 CR_{60}	—	April 10, 2005	Mount Lemmon	Mount Lemmon Survey	·	1.2 km	MPC · JPL
777595	2009 CT_{60}	—	February 5, 2009	Kitt Peak	Spacewatch	(5)	850 m	MPC · JPL
777596	2009 CM_{67}	—	March 13, 2005	Mount Lemmon	Mount Lemmon Survey	·	830 m	MPC · JPL
777597	2009 CM_{69}	—	December 31, 2013	Kitt Peak	Spacewatch	·	2.2 km	MPC · JPL
777598	2009 CU_{69}	—	February 13, 2009	Mount Lemmon	Mount Lemmon Survey	DOR	1.9 km	MPC · JPL
777599	2009 CB_{72}	—	December 6, 2013	Haleakala	Pan-STARRS 1	·	2.1 km	MPC · JPL
777600	2009 CK_{72}	—	October 26, 2013	Mount Lemmon	Mount Lemmon Survey	·	2.1 km	MPC · JPL

== 777601–777700 ==
back to top

Designation			Discovery			Properties		Ref
Permanent	Provisional	Named after	Date	Site	Discoverer(s)	Category	Diam.	Ref
777601	2009 CF_{73}	—	January 17, 2013	Haleakala	Pan-STARRS 1	·	1 km	MPC · JPL
777602	2009 CU_{73}	—	January 30, 2017	Mount Lemmon	Mount Lemmon Survey	·	950 m	MPC · JPL
777603	2009 CC_{74}	—	August 17, 2017	Haleakala	Pan-STARRS 1	LIX	2.3 km	MPC · JPL
777604	2009 CS_{74}	—	January 1, 2014	Kitt Peak	Spacewatch	·	1.2 km	MPC · JPL
777605	2009 CM_{75}	—	February 4, 2009	Mount Lemmon	Mount Lemmon Survey	TIR	2.2 km	MPC · JPL
777606	2009 CV_{75}	—	February 14, 2009	Mount Lemmon	Mount Lemmon Survey	·	1.6 km	MPC · JPL
777607	2009 CA_{76}	—	March 20, 2004	Socorro	LINEAR	·	1.5 km	MPC · JPL
777608	2009 CL_{77}	—	February 5, 2009	Kitt Peak	Spacewatch	·	1.5 km	MPC · JPL
777609	2009 CC_{78}	—	February 1, 2009	Kitt Peak	Spacewatch	·	1.2 km	MPC · JPL
777610	2009 DB	—	February 16, 2009	Calar Alto	F. Hormuth, Datson, J. C.	EOS	1.3 km	MPC · JPL
777611	2009 DY_{4}	—	February 20, 2009	Calar Alto	F. Hormuth	·	2.1 km	MPC · JPL
777612	2009 DZ_{9}	—	February 20, 2009	Calar Alto	F. Hormuth	·	1.9 km	MPC · JPL
777613	2009 DB_{10}	—	February 20, 2009	Calar Alto	F. Hormuth	EOS	1.4 km	MPC · JPL
777614	2009 DO_{10}	—	February 21, 2009	Calar Alto	F. Hormuth	EOS	1.4 km	MPC · JPL
777615	2009 DR_{10}	—	February 21, 2009	Calar Alto	F. Hormuth	·	2.0 km	MPC · JPL
777616	2009 DY_{20}	—	January 1, 2009	Kitt Peak	Spacewatch	·	1.6 km	MPC · JPL
777617	2009 DZ_{26}	—	February 22, 2009	Calar Alto	F. Hormuth	·	800 m	MPC · JPL
777618	2009 DQ_{37}	—	February 2, 2009	Kitt Peak	Spacewatch	·	1.6 km	MPC · JPL
777619	2009 DF_{44}	—	February 5, 2009	Kitt Peak	Spacewatch	TIR	1.9 km	MPC · JPL
777620	2009 DT_{52}	—	February 22, 2009	Kitt Peak	Spacewatch	·	1.5 km	MPC · JPL
777621	2009 DZ_{53}	—	February 22, 2009	Kitt Peak	Spacewatch	·	2.0 km	MPC · JPL
777622	2009 DF_{54}	—	February 1, 2009	Kitt Peak	Spacewatch	THM	1.6 km	MPC · JPL
777623	2009 DL_{54}	—	February 22, 2009	Kitt Peak	Spacewatch	·	1.5 km	MPC · JPL
777624	2009 DP_{56}	—	February 22, 2009	Kitt Peak	Spacewatch	·	2.2 km	MPC · JPL
777625	2009 DR_{58}	—	February 22, 2009	Kitt Peak	Spacewatch	EUP	2.1 km	MPC · JPL
777626	2009 DR_{60}	—	February 22, 2009	Kitt Peak	Spacewatch	·	780 m	MPC · JPL
777627	2009 DL_{67}	—	February 21, 2009	Kitt Peak	Spacewatch	EOS	1.3 km	MPC · JPL
777628	2009 DN_{84}	—	February 22, 2009	Kitt Peak	Spacewatch	·	1.7 km	MPC · JPL
777629	2009 DF_{85}	—	February 27, 2009	Kitt Peak	Spacewatch	·	1.2 km	MPC · JPL
777630	2009 DM_{87}	—	February 27, 2009	Kitt Peak	Spacewatch	·	920 m	MPC · JPL
777631	2009 DZ_{90}	—	February 26, 2009	Mount Lemmon	Mount Lemmon Survey	·	1.8 km	MPC · JPL
777632	2009 DZ_{95}	—	February 25, 2009	Catalina	CSS	·	1.0 km	MPC · JPL
777633	2009 DL_{97}	—	January 29, 2009	Mount Lemmon	Mount Lemmon Survey	·	2.1 km	MPC · JPL
777634	2009 DA_{102}	—	February 26, 2009	Kitt Peak	Spacewatch	·	940 m	MPC · JPL
777635	2009 DL_{102}	—	February 26, 2009	Kitt Peak	Spacewatch	LIX	2.3 km	MPC · JPL
777636	2009 DB_{108}	—	February 24, 2009	Mount Lemmon	Mount Lemmon Survey	·	970 m	MPC · JPL
777637	2009 DY_{122}	—	January 25, 2009	Kitt Peak	Spacewatch	·	1.6 km	MPC · JPL
777638	2009 DB_{124}	—	February 19, 2009	Kitt Peak	Spacewatch	·	1.9 km	MPC · JPL
777639	2009 DF_{131}	—	February 24, 2009	Mount Lemmon	Mount Lemmon Survey	·	2.1 km	MPC · JPL
777640	2009 DO_{131}	—	February 19, 2009	Kitt Peak	Spacewatch	·	1.7 km	MPC · JPL
777641	2009 DN_{136}	—	February 19, 2009	Kitt Peak	Spacewatch	·	1.8 km	MPC · JPL
777642	2009 DF_{141}	—	February 20, 2009	Kitt Peak	Spacewatch	·	1.8 km	MPC · JPL
777643	2009 DP_{141}	—	February 24, 2009	Kitt Peak	Spacewatch	·	1.5 km	MPC · JPL
777644	2009 DF_{145}	—	February 20, 2009	Mount Lemmon	Mount Lemmon Survey	·	1.0 km	MPC · JPL
777645	2009 DZ_{147}	—	October 10, 2012	Haleakala	Pan-STARRS 1	·	1.7 km	MPC · JPL
777646	2009 DE_{149}	—	February 24, 2009	Mount Lemmon	Mount Lemmon Survey	EUN	770 m	MPC · JPL
777647	2009 DQ_{149}	—	March 22, 2015	Mount Lemmon	Mount Lemmon Survey	·	2.2 km	MPC · JPL
777648	2009 DR_{149}	—	March 6, 2013	Haleakala	Pan-STARRS 1	·	860 m	MPC · JPL
777649	2009 DU_{149}	—	February 28, 2009	Mount Lemmon	Mount Lemmon Survey	EOS	1.6 km	MPC · JPL
777650	2009 DS_{150}	—	February 19, 2009	Kitt Peak	Spacewatch	3:2	4.3 km	MPC · JPL
777651	2009 DQ_{152}	—	October 16, 2012	Mount Lemmon	Mount Lemmon Survey	·	1.7 km	MPC · JPL
777652	2009 DR_{152}	—	August 28, 2014	Haleakala	Pan-STARRS 1	·	840 m	MPC · JPL
777653	2009 DB_{154}	—	February 27, 2009	Mount Lemmon	Mount Lemmon Survey	·	1.6 km	MPC · JPL
777654	2009 DD_{154}	—	February 21, 2009	Mount Lemmon	Mount Lemmon Survey	·	820 m	MPC · JPL
777655	2009 DX_{154}	—	February 19, 2009	Kitt Peak	Spacewatch	·	1.5 km	MPC · JPL
777656	2009 DM_{156}	—	February 20, 2009	Kitt Peak	Spacewatch	·	1.7 km	MPC · JPL
777657	2009 DS_{156}	—	February 22, 2009	Mount Lemmon	Mount Lemmon Survey	·	1.7 km	MPC · JPL
777658	2009 DC_{157}	—	February 28, 2009	Kitt Peak	Spacewatch	·	1.7 km	MPC · JPL
777659	2009 DV_{157}	—	February 26, 2009	Mount Lemmon	Mount Lemmon Survey	·	2.0 km	MPC · JPL
777660	2009 DK_{158}	—	February 27, 2009	Kitt Peak	Spacewatch	·	1.1 km	MPC · JPL
777661	2009 DL_{158}	—	February 20, 2009	Kitt Peak	Spacewatch	·	1.8 km	MPC · JPL
777662	2009 DT_{158}	—	February 22, 2009	Kitt Peak	Spacewatch	·	1.9 km	MPC · JPL
777663	2009 DN_{159}	—	February 27, 2009	Kitt Peak	Spacewatch	·	1.9 km	MPC · JPL
777664	2009 DP_{159}	—	February 20, 2009	Mount Lemmon	Mount Lemmon Survey	·	1.3 km	MPC · JPL
777665	2009 DD_{160}	—	February 19, 2009	Mount Lemmon	Mount Lemmon Survey	EOS	1.3 km	MPC · JPL
777666	2009 DF_{160}	—	February 19, 2009	Kitt Peak	Spacewatch	·	1.2 km	MPC · JPL
777667	2009 DX_{160}	—	February 23, 2009	Mauna Kea	P. A. Wiegert	·	1.9 km	MPC · JPL
777668	2009 DN_{162}	—	February 20, 2009	Kitt Peak	Spacewatch	·	1.9 km	MPC · JPL
777669	2009 DN_{163}	—	February 27, 2009	Kitt Peak	Spacewatch	·	1.6 km	MPC · JPL
777670	2009 DX_{163}	—	February 20, 2009	Kitt Peak	Spacewatch	·	700 m	MPC · JPL
777671	2009 DF_{164}	—	February 22, 2009	Kitt Peak	Spacewatch	THM	1.6 km	MPC · JPL
777672	2009 DL_{164}	—	February 22, 2009	Kitt Peak	Spacewatch	·	1.7 km	MPC · JPL
777673	2009 EV_{8}	—	March 2, 2009	Kitt Peak	Spacewatch	·	2.2 km	MPC · JPL
777674	2009 EJ_{22}	—	March 2, 2009	Kitt Peak	Spacewatch	LIX	2.2 km	MPC · JPL
777675	2009 EZ_{24}	—	March 3, 2009	Mount Lemmon	Mount Lemmon Survey	·	2.1 km	MPC · JPL
777676	2009 EB_{27}	—	March 15, 2009	Kitt Peak	Spacewatch	·	1.3 km	MPC · JPL
777677	2009 ER_{29}	—	March 3, 2009	Mount Lemmon	Mount Lemmon Survey	·	940 m	MPC · JPL
777678	2009 ER_{34}	—	March 3, 2009	Mount Lemmon	Mount Lemmon Survey	·	750 m	MPC · JPL
777679	2009 EY_{34}	—	December 31, 2013	Mount Lemmon	Mount Lemmon Survey	VER	1.7 km	MPC · JPL
777680	2009 EB_{35}	—	February 16, 2013	Mount Lemmon	Mount Lemmon Survey	·	1.1 km	MPC · JPL
777681	2009 EM_{35}	—	March 2, 2009	Kitt Peak	Spacewatch	·	1.1 km	MPC · JPL
777682	2009 EC_{36}	—	September 14, 2017	Haleakala	Pan-STARRS 1	·	1.7 km	MPC · JPL
777683	2009 EP_{36}	—	September 16, 2012	Mount Lemmon	Mount Lemmon Survey	·	1.5 km	MPC · JPL
777684	2009 EB_{38}	—	February 18, 2015	Kitt Peak	Spacewatch	·	1.9 km	MPC · JPL
777685	2009 EH_{38}	—	March 1, 2009	Kitt Peak	Spacewatch	·	1.9 km	MPC · JPL
777686	2009 EJ_{38}	—	June 8, 2016	Haleakala	Pan-STARRS 1	·	1.9 km	MPC · JPL
777687	2009 EQ_{38}	—	September 21, 2011	Mount Lemmon	Mount Lemmon Survey	KOR	1.1 km	MPC · JPL
777688	2009 EZ_{38}	—	March 2, 2009	Mount Lemmon	Mount Lemmon Survey	·	2.2 km	MPC · JPL
777689	2009 EU_{39}	—	March 3, 2009	Mount Lemmon	Mount Lemmon Survey	·	1.3 km	MPC · JPL
777690	2009 EY_{39}	—	March 2, 2009	Mount Lemmon	Mount Lemmon Survey	·	2.1 km	MPC · JPL
777691	2009 EM_{40}	—	March 1, 2009	Kitt Peak	Spacewatch	·	1.0 km	MPC · JPL
777692	2009 EO_{40}	—	March 3, 2009	Mount Lemmon	Mount Lemmon Survey	·	2.1 km	MPC · JPL
777693	2009 EG_{43}	—	March 2, 2009	Kitt Peak	Spacewatch	MAR	680 m	MPC · JPL
777694	2009 EJ_{43}	—	February 20, 2009	Kitt Peak	Spacewatch	EOS	1.3 km	MPC · JPL
777695	2009 EK_{43}	—	March 3, 2009	Kitt Peak	Spacewatch	·	850 m	MPC · JPL
777696	2009 EP_{43}	—	March 2, 2009	Kitt Peak	Spacewatch	·	2.2 km	MPC · JPL
777697	2009 EW_{43}	—	May 4, 2014	Mount Lemmon	Mount Lemmon Survey	·	1.5 km	MPC · JPL
777698	2009 EY_{43}	—	March 3, 2009	Kitt Peak	Spacewatch	·	810 m	MPC · JPL
777699	2009 FB_{10}	—	March 17, 2009	Kitt Peak	Spacewatch	·	1.7 km	MPC · JPL
777700	2009 FB_{14}	—	March 2, 2009	Mount Lemmon	Mount Lemmon Survey	·	1.8 km	MPC · JPL

== 777701–777800 ==
back to top

Designation			Discovery			Properties		Ref
Permanent	Provisional	Named after	Date	Site	Discoverer(s)	Category	Diam.	Ref
777701	2009 FD_{19}	—	March 20, 2009	La Cañada	Lacruz, J.	THM	1.5 km	MPC · JPL
777702	2009 FD_{27}	—	March 11, 2005	Mount Lemmon	Mount Lemmon Survey	·	880 m	MPC · JPL
777703	2009 FL_{30}	—	March 21, 2009	Wallingup Plain	Todd, M.	·	840 m	MPC · JPL
777704	2009 FZ_{33}	—	January 17, 2009	Kitt Peak	Spacewatch	·	2.1 km	MPC · JPL
777705	2009 FN_{37}	—	March 24, 2009	Mount Lemmon	Mount Lemmon Survey	JUN	840 m	MPC · JPL
777706	2009 FF_{49}	—	March 27, 2009	Mount Lemmon	Mount Lemmon Survey	·	1.6 km	MPC · JPL
777707	2009 FU_{50}	—	August 9, 2005	Cerro Tololo	Deep Ecliptic Survey	·	2.1 km	MPC · JPL
777708	2009 FL_{51}	—	March 3, 2009	Kitt Peak	Spacewatch	·	1.6 km	MPC · JPL
777709	2009 FD_{56}	—	February 26, 2009	Catalina	CSS	T_{j} (2.98)	2.6 km	MPC · JPL
777710	2009 FY_{70}	—	March 26, 2009	Kitt Peak	Spacewatch	·	860 m	MPC · JPL
777711	2009 FP_{78}	—	March 22, 2009	Catalina	CSS	·	2.2 km	MPC · JPL
777712	2009 FF_{82}	—	November 6, 2013	Haleakala	Pan-STARRS 1	EUP	2.8 km	MPC · JPL
777713	2009 FP_{83}	—	October 20, 2011	Mount Lemmon	Mount Lemmon Survey	RAF	640 m	MPC · JPL
777714	2009 FG_{85}	—	February 26, 2009	Kitt Peak	Spacewatch	·	2.6 km	MPC · JPL
777715	2009 FD_{86}	—	March 22, 2009	Mount Lemmon	Mount Lemmon Survey	·	1.7 km	MPC · JPL
777716	2009 FS_{86}	—	January 7, 2014	Mount Lemmon	Mount Lemmon Survey	EOS	1.4 km	MPC · JPL
777717	2009 FM_{87}	—	February 28, 2014	Mount Lemmon	Mount Lemmon Survey	·	1.7 km	MPC · JPL
777718	2009 FQ_{88}	—	September 19, 2017	Haleakala	Pan-STARRS 1	·	1.6 km	MPC · JPL
777719	2009 FA_{89}	—	October 14, 2017	Mount Lemmon	Mount Lemmon Survey	·	1.9 km	MPC · JPL
777720	2009 FN_{89}	—	March 27, 2009	Mount Lemmon	Mount Lemmon Survey	·	1.5 km	MPC · JPL
777721	2009 FQ_{89}	—	March 22, 2009	Mount Lemmon	Mount Lemmon Survey	AGN	890 m	MPC · JPL
777722	2009 FR_{89}	—	September 23, 2015	Haleakala	Pan-STARRS 1	·	880 m	MPC · JPL
777723	2009 FS_{89}	—	September 16, 2012	Kitt Peak	Spacewatch	·	2.1 km	MPC · JPL
777724	2009 FO_{90}	—	March 29, 2009	Kitt Peak	Spacewatch	·	2.0 km	MPC · JPL
777725	2009 FP_{90}	—	March 19, 2009	Mount Lemmon	Mount Lemmon Survey	EOS	1.4 km	MPC · JPL
777726	2009 FU_{90}	—	March 21, 2009	Mount Lemmon	Mount Lemmon Survey	·	1.4 km	MPC · JPL
777727	2009 FF_{91}	—	March 21, 2009	Mount Lemmon	Mount Lemmon Survey	·	1.5 km	MPC · JPL
777728	2009 FQ_{91}	—	March 26, 2009	Mount Lemmon	Mount Lemmon Survey	·	1.8 km	MPC · JPL
777729	2009 FP_{92}	—	March 31, 2009	Kitt Peak	Spacewatch	·	2.4 km	MPC · JPL
777730	2009 FP_{93}	—	March 16, 2009	Kitt Peak	Spacewatch	·	2.1 km	MPC · JPL
777731	2009 FR_{93}	—	March 31, 2009	Mount Lemmon	Mount Lemmon Survey	THM	1.7 km	MPC · JPL
777732	2009 FS_{93}	—	March 21, 2009	Mount Lemmon	Mount Lemmon Survey	·	2.1 km	MPC · JPL
777733	2009 FH_{94}	—	March 31, 2009	Kitt Peak	Spacewatch	·	2.3 km	MPC · JPL
777734	2009 FU_{94}	—	March 22, 2009	Mount Lemmon	Mount Lemmon Survey	BAR	1.0 km	MPC · JPL
777735	2009 FH_{95}	—	March 29, 2009	Kitt Peak	Spacewatch	·	2.1 km	MPC · JPL
777736	2009 FM_{95}	—	March 23, 2009	Mauna Kea	P. A. Wiegert	VER	1.7 km	MPC · JPL
777737	2009 FO_{96}	—	March 21, 2009	Mount Lemmon	Mount Lemmon Survey	·	1.9 km	MPC · JPL
777738	2009 FK_{97}	—	March 21, 2009	Mount Lemmon	Mount Lemmon Survey	·	1.6 km	MPC · JPL
777739	2009 FR_{97}	—	March 22, 2009	Mount Lemmon	Mount Lemmon Survey	·	2.0 km	MPC · JPL
777740	2009 GY_{8}	—	April 2, 2009	Mount Lemmon	Mount Lemmon Survey	·	2.0 km	MPC · JPL
777741	2009 GE_{9}	—	April 2, 2009	Mount Lemmon	Mount Lemmon Survey	·	1.9 km	MPC · JPL
777742	2009 HO_{6}	—	February 20, 2009	Mount Lemmon	Mount Lemmon Survey	·	2.0 km	MPC · JPL
777743	2009 HP_{15}	—	April 18, 2009	Kitt Peak	Spacewatch	·	1.3 km	MPC · JPL
777744	2009 HN_{17}	—	April 18, 2009	Kitt Peak	Spacewatch	·	1.2 km	MPC · JPL
777745	2009 HJ_{19}	—	April 19, 2009	Mount Lemmon	Mount Lemmon Survey	THM	1.6 km	MPC · JPL
777746	2009 HX_{20}	—	April 20, 2009	Kitt Peak	Spacewatch	·	2.3 km	MPC · JPL
777747	2009 HB_{24}	—	April 17, 2009	Kitt Peak	Spacewatch	·	2.4 km	MPC · JPL
777748	2009 HB_{27}	—	April 18, 2009	Kitt Peak	Spacewatch	·	2.0 km	MPC · JPL
777749	2009 HP_{28}	—	March 26, 2009	Kitt Peak	Spacewatch	JUN	850 m	MPC · JPL
777750	2009 HZ_{28}	—	March 26, 2009	Mount Lemmon	Mount Lemmon Survey	·	1.9 km	MPC · JPL
777751	2009 HX_{32}	—	April 19, 2009	Kitt Peak	Spacewatch	LIX	2.5 km	MPC · JPL
777752	2009 HY_{32}	—	April 19, 2009	Kitt Peak	Spacewatch	·	760 m	MPC · JPL
777753	2009 HH_{38}	—	March 21, 2009	Kitt Peak	Spacewatch	·	830 m	MPC · JPL
777754	2009 HE_{39}	—	April 18, 2009	Kitt Peak	Spacewatch	·	2.2 km	MPC · JPL
777755	2009 HV_{47}	—	April 19, 2009	Kitt Peak	Spacewatch	·	990 m	MPC · JPL
777756	2009 HH_{55}	—	April 21, 2009	Mount Lemmon	Mount Lemmon Survey	·	2.2 km	MPC · JPL
777757	2009 HT_{71}	—	April 20, 2009	Kitt Peak	Spacewatch	·	2.3 km	MPC · JPL
777758	2009 HM_{76}	—	October 29, 2006	Kitt Peak	Spacewatch	·	1.8 km	MPC · JPL
777759	2009 HR_{82}	—	February 10, 2005	La Silla	A. Boattini, H. Scholl	BAR	970 m	MPC · JPL
777760	2009 HD_{85}	—	April 17, 2009	Catalina	CSS	·	1.7 km	MPC · JPL
777761	2009 HN_{87}	—	March 18, 2009	Kitt Peak	Spacewatch	TIR	1.8 km	MPC · JPL
777762	2009 HK_{89}	—	April 26, 2009	Cerro Burek	I. de la Cueva	·	1.3 km	MPC · JPL
777763	2009 HZ_{91}	—	April 29, 2009	Kitt Peak	Spacewatch	AEO	910 m	MPC · JPL
777764	2009 HS_{94}	—	April 28, 2009	Cerro Burek	I. de la Cueva	(5651)	2.3 km	MPC · JPL
777765	2009 HO_{98}	—	April 22, 2009	Kitt Peak	Spacewatch	·	1.0 km	MPC · JPL
777766	2009 HZ_{102}	—	April 17, 2009	Kitt Peak	Spacewatch	·	2.2 km	MPC · JPL
777767	2009 HS_{104}	—	April 30, 2009	Mount Lemmon	Mount Lemmon Survey	LIX	3.0 km	MPC · JPL
777768	2009 HQ_{109}	—	March 28, 2015	Haleakala	Pan-STARRS 1	·	2.0 km	MPC · JPL
777769	2009 HW_{109}	—	July 11, 2016	Haleakala	Pan-STARRS 1	LIX	2.5 km	MPC · JPL
777770	2009 HX_{109}	—	February 26, 2014	Mount Lemmon	Mount Lemmon Survey	·	1.4 km	MPC · JPL
777771	2009 HL_{110}	—	September 25, 2011	Haleakala	Pan-STARRS 1	EUN	800 m	MPC · JPL
777772	2009 HN_{112}	—	October 14, 2012	Kitt Peak	Spacewatch	·	2.2 km	MPC · JPL
777773	2009 HZ_{112}	—	March 17, 2013	Kitt Peak	Spacewatch	·	710 m	MPC · JPL
777774	2009 HG_{113}	—	April 20, 2009	Kitt Peak	Spacewatch	EUN	790 m	MPC · JPL
777775	2009 HO_{113}	—	July 2, 2014	Haleakala	Pan-STARRS 1	MAR	770 m	MPC · JPL
777776	2009 HG_{114}	—	May 23, 2015	Mount Lemmon	Mount Lemmon Survey	·	2.4 km	MPC · JPL
777777	2009 HB_{115}	—	November 22, 2015	Mount Lemmon	Mount Lemmon Survey	·	1.3 km	MPC · JPL
777778	2009 HL_{115}	—	March 30, 2015	Haleakala	Pan-STARRS 1	·	2.1 km	MPC · JPL
777779	2009 HE_{117}	—	March 18, 2017	Haleakala	Pan-STARRS 1	HNS	680 m	MPC · JPL
777780	2009 HF_{117}	—	October 18, 2017	Haleakala	Pan-STARRS 1	·	2.4 km	MPC · JPL
777781	2009 HM_{118}	—	April 23, 2009	Kitt Peak	Spacewatch	·	1.4 km	MPC · JPL
777782	2009 HR_{118}	—	April 23, 2009	Mount Lemmon	Mount Lemmon Survey	·	770 m	MPC · JPL
777783	2009 HP_{120}	—	September 11, 2015	Haleakala	Pan-STARRS 1	·	1.4 km	MPC · JPL
777784	2009 HY_{121}	—	April 22, 2009	Mount Lemmon	Mount Lemmon Survey	·	1.8 km	MPC · JPL
777785	2009 HB_{122}	—	April 22, 2009	Mount Lemmon	Mount Lemmon Survey	·	2.1 km	MPC · JPL
777786	2009 HG_{122}	—	April 27, 2009	Mount Lemmon	Mount Lemmon Survey	·	2.5 km	MPC · JPL
777787	2009 HA_{125}	—	April 24, 2009	Mount Lemmon	Mount Lemmon Survey	·	1.9 km	MPC · JPL
777788	2009 HP_{125}	—	April 19, 2009	Mount Lemmon	Mount Lemmon Survey	EUN	1.0 km	MPC · JPL
777789	2009 HU_{125}	—	April 29, 2009	Kitt Peak	Spacewatch	·	2.2 km	MPC · JPL
777790	2009 HF_{126}	—	April 18, 2009	Kitt Peak	Spacewatch	·	810 m	MPC · JPL
777791	2009 HJ_{126}	—	March 18, 2018	Haleakala	Pan-STARRS 1	·	1.3 km	MPC · JPL
777792	2009 HT_{126}	—	April 18, 2009	Kitt Peak	Spacewatch	·	730 m	MPC · JPL
777793	2009 HK_{128}	—	April 30, 2009	Kitt Peak	Spacewatch	EUN	820 m	MPC · JPL
777794	2009 JB_{6}	—	May 13, 2009	Kitt Peak	Spacewatch	LIX	2.3 km	MPC · JPL
777795	2009 JH_{10}	—	May 14, 2009	Kitt Peak	Spacewatch	·	1.4 km	MPC · JPL
777796	2009 JK_{11}	—	May 15, 2009	Kitt Peak	Spacewatch	·	910 m	MPC · JPL
777797	2009 JG_{15}	—	May 2, 2009	Cerro Burek	I. de la Cueva	·	2.1 km	MPC · JPL
777798	2009 JY_{19}	—	May 21, 2015	Haleakala	Pan-STARRS 1	·	2.6 km	MPC · JPL
777799	2009 JG_{20}	—	May 4, 2009	Mount Lemmon	Mount Lemmon Survey	·	1.0 km	MPC · JPL
777800	2009 JP_{21}	—	February 26, 2014	Haleakala	Pan-STARRS 1	·	2.2 km	MPC · JPL

== 777801–777900 ==
back to top

Designation			Discovery			Properties		Ref
Permanent	Provisional	Named after	Date	Site	Discoverer(s)	Category	Diam.	Ref
777801	2009 JF_{22}	—	May 1, 2009	Kitt Peak	Spacewatch	·	2.1 km	MPC · JPL
777802	2009 JR_{22}	—	May 1, 2009	Kitt Peak	Spacewatch	·	2.1 km	MPC · JPL
777803	2009 JX_{22}	—	May 4, 2009	Kitt Peak	Spacewatch	EUN	910 m	MPC · JPL
777804	2009 JM_{23}	—	May 4, 2009	Kitt Peak	Spacewatch	·	2.3 km	MPC · JPL
777805	2009 JT_{23}	—	May 14, 2009	Mauna Kea	P. A. Wiegert	·	1.3 km	MPC · JPL
777806	2009 KK_{13}	—	April 29, 2009	Kitt Peak	Spacewatch	·	2.1 km	MPC · JPL
777807	2009 KO_{14}	—	May 26, 2009	Kitt Peak	Spacewatch	·	2.2 km	MPC · JPL
777808	2009 KH_{24}	—	May 1, 2009	Mount Lemmon	Mount Lemmon Survey	·	2.0 km	MPC · JPL
777809	2009 KL_{28}	—	May 16, 2009	Mount Lemmon	Mount Lemmon Survey	·	2.2 km	MPC · JPL
777810	2009 KH_{29}	—	May 28, 2009	Mount Lemmon	Mount Lemmon Survey	·	970 m	MPC · JPL
777811	2009 KW_{39}	—	January 18, 2016	Mount Lemmon	Mount Lemmon Survey	·	960 m	MPC · JPL
777812	2009 KY_{39}	—	September 19, 2014	Haleakala	Pan-STARRS 1	·	1.2 km	MPC · JPL
777813	2009 KX_{40}	—	October 26, 2011	Haleakala	Pan-STARRS 1	EUN	850 m	MPC · JPL
777814	2009 KA_{41}	—	October 8, 2015	Haleakala	Pan-STARRS 1	·	1.7 km	MPC · JPL
777815	2009 KE_{42}	—	June 4, 2014	Haleakala	Pan-STARRS 1	·	1.4 km	MPC · JPL
777816	2009 KQ_{42}	—	May 16, 2009	Kitt Peak	Spacewatch	·	2.2 km	MPC · JPL
777817	2009 KB_{43}	—	May 30, 2009	Mount Lemmon	Mount Lemmon Survey	·	2.0 km	MPC · JPL
777818	2009 KG_{44}	—	May 18, 2009	Mount Lemmon	Mount Lemmon Survey	·	1.3 km	MPC · JPL
777819	2009 KW_{44}	—	May 16, 2009	Kitt Peak	Spacewatch	EUN	790 m	MPC · JPL
777820	2009 KF_{45}	—	September 14, 2023	Haleakala	Pan-STARRS 1	·	2.1 km	MPC · JPL
777821	2009 LG	—	June 1, 2009	Bergisch Gladbach	W. Bickel	·	1.0 km	MPC · JPL
777822	2009 LH_{8}	—	June 15, 2009	Mount Lemmon	Mount Lemmon Survey	JUN	860 m	MPC · JPL
777823	2009 MU_{3}	—	June 19, 2009	Kitt Peak	Spacewatch	·	2.0 km	MPC · JPL
777824	2009 ML_{8}	—	May 31, 1997	Kitt Peak	Spacewatch	·	1.2 km	MPC · JPL
777825	2009 MQ_{10}	—	June 24, 2009	Mount Lemmon	Mount Lemmon Survey	·	2.6 km	MPC · JPL
777826	2009 OQ_{19}	—	July 28, 2009	Kitt Peak	Spacewatch	·	1.0 km	MPC · JPL
777827	2009 OF_{23}	—	July 29, 2009	Catalina	CSS	·	2.0 km	MPC · JPL
777828	2009 OV_{26}	—	July 27, 2009	Kitt Peak	Spacewatch	·	910 m	MPC · JPL
777829	2009 OV_{28}	—	July 28, 2009	Kitt Peak	Spacewatch	·	1.2 km	MPC · JPL
777830	2009 OH_{30}	—	July 28, 2009	Kitt Peak	Spacewatch	·	1.1 km	MPC · JPL
777831	2009 OK_{30}	—	July 28, 2009	Kitt Peak	Spacewatch	·	820 m	MPC · JPL
777832	2009 PL_{3}	—	August 12, 2009	La Sagra	OAM	·	860 m	MPC · JPL
777833	2009 PB_{6}	—	August 10, 2009	Kitt Peak	Spacewatch	·	1.4 km	MPC · JPL
777834	2009 PB_{15}	—	July 27, 2009	Catalina	CSS	·	2.6 km	MPC · JPL
777835	2009 PF_{17}	—	August 15, 2009	Catalina	CSS	·	1.7 km	MPC · JPL
777836	2009 PL_{24}	—	August 15, 2009	Kitt Peak	Spacewatch	·	1.5 km	MPC · JPL
777837	2009 QH	—	August 16, 2009	Kitt Peak	Spacewatch	·	1.3 km	MPC · JPL
777838	2009 QA_{9}	—	August 19, 2009	Markleeville	Matson, R. D.	·	1.3 km	MPC · JPL
777839	2009 QH_{15}	—	August 16, 2009	Kitt Peak	Spacewatch	·	1.3 km	MPC · JPL
777840	2009 QE_{18}	—	August 17, 2009	Kitt Peak	Spacewatch	·	1.7 km	MPC · JPL
777841	2009 QJ_{29}	—	August 22, 2009	Bergisch Gladbach	W. Bickel	JUN	710 m	MPC · JPL
777842	2009 QB_{30}	—	August 20, 2009	Punaauia	Teamo, N.	·	1.4 km	MPC · JPL
777843	2009 QG_{49}	—	August 28, 2009	Kitt Peak	Spacewatch	·	1.1 km	MPC · JPL
777844	2009 QS_{53}	—	August 17, 2009	Catalina	CSS	·	1.5 km	MPC · JPL
777845	2009 QN_{60}	—	August 17, 2009	Catalina	CSS	·	1.4 km	MPC · JPL
777846	2009 QJ_{68}	—	August 16, 2009	Kitt Peak	Spacewatch	·	1.2 km	MPC · JPL
777847	2009 QN_{69}	—	August 16, 2009	Kitt Peak	Spacewatch	·	1.6 km	MPC · JPL
777848	2009 QA_{70}	—	August 18, 2009	Kitt Peak	Spacewatch	·	1.4 km	MPC · JPL
777849	2009 QF_{71}	—	August 20, 2009	Kitt Peak	Spacewatch	·	1.4 km	MPC · JPL
777850	2009 QS_{71}	—	August 27, 2009	Kitt Peak	Spacewatch	·	710 m	MPC · JPL
777851	2009 QZ_{71}	—	August 27, 2009	Kitt Peak	Spacewatch	KOR	1.1 km	MPC · JPL
777852	2009 QB_{78}	—	August 28, 2009	Kitt Peak	Spacewatch	·	1.4 km	MPC · JPL
777853	2009 QM_{78}	—	August 27, 2009	Kitt Peak	Spacewatch	·	1.3 km	MPC · JPL
777854	2009 QR_{78}	—	August 19, 2009	La Sagra	OAM	·	1.2 km	MPC · JPL
777855	2009 QE_{79}	—	August 28, 2009	Kitt Peak	Spacewatch	·	2.7 km	MPC · JPL
777856	2009 QW_{79}	—	August 27, 2009	Kitt Peak	Spacewatch	PAD	1.1 km	MPC · JPL
777857	2009 QX_{79}	—	August 17, 2009	Siding Spring	SSS	EUN	960 m	MPC · JPL
777858	2009 QC_{82}	—	August 28, 2009	Kitt Peak	Spacewatch	·	1.2 km	MPC · JPL
777859	2009 QR_{83}	—	August 29, 2009	Kitt Peak	Spacewatch	·	1.3 km	MPC · JPL
777860	2009 RH_{4}	—	September 10, 2009	Bisei	BATTeRS	·	1.8 km	MPC · JPL
777861	2009 RT_{4}	—	September 12, 2009	ESA OGS	ESA OGS	·	1.4 km	MPC · JPL
777862	2009 RR_{5}	—	August 15, 2009	Kitt Peak	Spacewatch	·	890 m	MPC · JPL
777863	2009 RO_{15}	—	September 12, 2009	Kitt Peak	Spacewatch	·	1.7 km	MPC · JPL
777864	2009 RU_{20}	—	September 14, 2009	Kitt Peak	Spacewatch	·	1.3 km	MPC · JPL
777865	2009 RE_{25}	—	September 15, 2009	Mount Lemmon	Mount Lemmon Survey	L4	7.3 km	MPC · JPL
777866	2009 RJ_{25}	—	July 29, 2009	Kitt Peak	Spacewatch	·	1.6 km	MPC · JPL
777867	2009 RY_{27}	—	September 12, 1996	Kitt Peak	Spacewatch	(1547)	850 m	MPC · JPL
777868	2009 RX_{29}	—	September 14, 2009	Kitt Peak	Spacewatch	DOR	2.0 km	MPC · JPL
777869	2009 RF_{34}	—	September 14, 2009	Kitt Peak	Spacewatch	·	1.5 km	MPC · JPL
777870	2009 RS_{37}	—	September 15, 2009	Kitt Peak	Spacewatch	·	1.4 km	MPC · JPL
777871	2009 RW_{45}	—	September 15, 2009	Kitt Peak	Spacewatch	EUN	1.0 km	MPC · JPL
777872	2009 RM_{47}	—	September 15, 2009	Kitt Peak	Spacewatch	(1547)	1.4 km	MPC · JPL
777873	2009 RG_{71}	—	September 15, 2009	Kitt Peak	Spacewatch	·	1.8 km	MPC · JPL
777874	2009 RY_{77}	—	September 15, 2009	Kitt Peak	Spacewatch	·	990 m	MPC · JPL
777875	2009 RA_{79}	—	March 5, 2013	Haleakala	Pan-STARRS 1	·	2.4 km	MPC · JPL
777876	2009 RK_{82}	—	September 14, 2009	Kitt Peak	Spacewatch	EOS	1.5 km	MPC · JPL
777877	2009 RW_{83}	—	September 14, 2009	Kitt Peak	Spacewatch	·	1.2 km	MPC · JPL
777878	2009 SF_{4}	—	September 16, 2009	Mount Lemmon	Mount Lemmon Survey	·	1.1 km	MPC · JPL
777879	2009 ST_{5}	—	September 16, 2009	Mount Lemmon	Mount Lemmon Survey	·	1.3 km	MPC · JPL
777880	2009 SB_{6}	—	September 16, 2009	Mount Lemmon	Mount Lemmon Survey	·	1.3 km	MPC · JPL
777881	2009 SD_{8}	—	August 18, 2009	Kitt Peak	Spacewatch	·	1.4 km	MPC · JPL
777882	2009 SQ_{8}	—	September 16, 2009	Mount Lemmon	Mount Lemmon Survey	·	1.3 km	MPC · JPL
777883	2009 ST_{9}	—	September 16, 2009	Mount Lemmon	Mount Lemmon Survey	·	1.4 km	MPC · JPL
777884	2009 SZ_{9}	—	September 16, 2009	Mount Lemmon	Mount Lemmon Survey	·	1.3 km	MPC · JPL
777885	2009 SN_{11}	—	September 16, 2009	Mount Lemmon	Mount Lemmon Survey	·	1.1 km	MPC · JPL
777886	2009 SY_{22}	—	August 31, 2005	Kitt Peak	Spacewatch	·	1.1 km	MPC · JPL
777887	2009 SJ_{25}	—	September 16, 2009	Kitt Peak	Spacewatch	·	1.8 km	MPC · JPL
777888	2009 SV_{28}	—	September 16, 2009	Kitt Peak	Spacewatch	AST	1.2 km	MPC · JPL
777889	2009 SL_{30}	—	September 16, 2009	Kitt Peak	Spacewatch	HOF	1.9 km	MPC · JPL
777890	2009 SA_{45}	—	September 16, 2009	Kitt Peak	Spacewatch	·	1.2 km	MPC · JPL
777891	2009 SV_{52}	—	August 16, 2009	Kitt Peak	Spacewatch	·	1.3 km	MPC · JPL
777892	2009 SU_{58}	—	September 17, 2009	Kitt Peak	Spacewatch	·	1.2 km	MPC · JPL
777893	2009 SA_{60}	—	September 17, 2009	Kitt Peak	Spacewatch	L4	5.6 km	MPC · JPL
777894	2009 SW_{61}	—	September 17, 2009	Mount Lemmon	Mount Lemmon Survey	·	1.2 km	MPC · JPL
777895	2009 SO_{62}	—	October 28, 2005	Mount Lemmon	Mount Lemmon Survey	·	1.2 km	MPC · JPL
777896	2009 SO_{63}	—	September 17, 2009	Mount Lemmon	Mount Lemmon Survey	KOR	1.1 km	MPC · JPL
777897	2009 SL_{65}	—	March 13, 2008	Kitt Peak	Spacewatch	·	1.1 km	MPC · JPL
777898	2009 SZ_{66}	—	September 17, 2009	Kitt Peak	Spacewatch	KOR	1.0 km	MPC · JPL
777899	2009 ST_{70}	—	December 2, 2005	Kitt Peak	Spacewatch	·	1.4 km	MPC · JPL
777900	2009 SZ_{75}	—	September 17, 2009	Kitt Peak	Spacewatch	·	1.8 km	MPC · JPL

== 777901–778000 ==
back to top

Designation			Discovery			Properties		Ref
Permanent	Provisional	Named after	Date	Site	Discoverer(s)	Category	Diam.	Ref
777901	2009 SL_{87}	—	September 18, 2009	Mount Lemmon	Mount Lemmon Survey	·	1.5 km	MPC · JPL
777902	2009 SJ_{97}	—	August 28, 2009	Kitt Peak	Spacewatch	·	910 m	MPC · JPL
777903	2009 SM_{97}	—	August 16, 2009	Kitt Peak	Spacewatch	(18466)	1.5 km	MPC · JPL
777904	2009 SX_{108}	—	April 3, 2008	Mount Lemmon	Mount Lemmon Survey	·	1.4 km	MPC · JPL
777905	2009 SX_{111}	—	September 18, 2009	Kitt Peak	Spacewatch	·	1.2 km	MPC · JPL
777906	2009 ST_{116}	—	September 18, 2009	Kitt Peak	Spacewatch	·	1.4 km	MPC · JPL
777907	2009 SS_{126}	—	September 18, 2009	Kitt Peak	Spacewatch	·	2.2 km	MPC · JPL
777908	2009 SX_{132}	—	September 18, 2009	Kitt Peak	Spacewatch	·	1.4 km	MPC · JPL
777909	2009 SP_{134}	—	April 14, 2012	Haleakala	Pan-STARRS 1	·	1.1 km	MPC · JPL
777910	2009 SJ_{144}	—	September 19, 2009	Mount Lemmon	Mount Lemmon Survey	DOR	1.6 km	MPC · JPL
777911	2009 SS_{144}	—	September 19, 2009	Mount Lemmon	Mount Lemmon Survey	·	1.3 km	MPC · JPL
777912	2009 SJ_{155}	—	September 20, 2009	Mount Lemmon	Mount Lemmon Survey	·	1.4 km	MPC · JPL
777913	2009 SH_{170}	—	September 24, 2009	Andrushivka	Y. Ivaščenko, Kyrylenko, P.	·	890 m	MPC · JPL
777914	2009 SL_{179}	—	September 20, 2009	Mount Lemmon	Mount Lemmon Survey	·	1.5 km	MPC · JPL
777915	2009 SE_{182}	—	September 21, 2009	Mount Lemmon	Mount Lemmon Survey	·	1.3 km	MPC · JPL
777916	2009 SH_{183}	—	September 21, 2009	Kitt Peak	Spacewatch	·	1.5 km	MPC · JPL
777917	2009 ST_{186}	—	September 21, 2009	Kitt Peak	Spacewatch	·	1.6 km	MPC · JPL
777918	2009 SJ_{189}	—	September 18, 2009	Kitt Peak	Spacewatch	ADE	1.4 km	MPC · JPL
777919	2009 SY_{190}	—	September 22, 2009	Kitt Peak	Spacewatch	·	1.4 km	MPC · JPL
777920	2009 SS_{194}	—	September 22, 2009	Kitt Peak	Spacewatch	·	1.6 km	MPC · JPL
777921	2009 SM_{196}	—	September 22, 2009	Mount Lemmon	Mount Lemmon Survey	·	1.4 km	MPC · JPL
777922	2009 SO_{201}	—	September 22, 2009	Kitt Peak	Spacewatch	KOR	910 m	MPC · JPL
777923	2009 SS_{203}	—	September 22, 2009	Kitt Peak	Spacewatch	EOS	1.4 km	MPC · JPL
777924	2009 SH_{208}	—	September 23, 2009	Kitt Peak	Spacewatch	·	2.1 km	MPC · JPL
777925	2009 SU_{208}	—	August 27, 2009	Kitt Peak	Spacewatch	AEO	950 m	MPC · JPL
777926	2009 SS_{214}	—	September 19, 2009	Kitt Peak	Spacewatch	·	1.7 km	MPC · JPL
777927	2009 SU_{217}	—	September 17, 2009	Mount Lemmon	Mount Lemmon Survey	·	1.2 km	MPC · JPL
777928	2009 SR_{220}	—	August 29, 2009	Kitt Peak	Spacewatch	·	1.5 km	MPC · JPL
777929	2009 SG_{221}	—	September 25, 2009	Mount Lemmon	Mount Lemmon Survey	·	1.3 km	MPC · JPL
777930	2009 SB_{223}	—	September 25, 2009	Mount Lemmon	Mount Lemmon Survey	L4	5.1 km	MPC · JPL
777931	2009 SV_{226}	—	August 18, 2009	Kitt Peak	Spacewatch	MRX	800 m	MPC · JPL
777932	2009 SD_{236}	—	September 16, 2009	Catalina	CSS	JUN	920 m	MPC · JPL
777933	2009 SK_{248}	—	September 24, 2009	Mount Lemmon	Mount Lemmon Survey	L4	6.0 km	MPC · JPL
777934	2009 SR_{248}	—	January 23, 2006	Kitt Peak	Spacewatch	·	1.5 km	MPC · JPL
777935	2009 SH_{252}	—	September 21, 2009	Kitt Peak	Spacewatch	L4	6.0 km	MPC · JPL
777936	2009 SJ_{252}	—	September 21, 2009	Kitt Peak	Spacewatch	L4	6.2 km	MPC · JPL
777937	2009 SR_{254}	—	September 21, 2009	Kitt Peak	Spacewatch	EOS	1.2 km	MPC · JPL
777938	2009 SF_{260}	—	September 22, 2009	Mount Lemmon	Mount Lemmon Survey	·	1.1 km	MPC · JPL
777939	2009 SP_{262}	—	September 15, 2009	Kitt Peak	Spacewatch	MRX	800 m	MPC · JPL
777940	2009 SV_{280}	—	September 17, 2009	Kitt Peak	Spacewatch	·	1.6 km	MPC · JPL
777941	2009 SR_{284}	—	September 25, 2009	Mount Lemmon	Mount Lemmon Survey	·	2.2 km	MPC · JPL
777942	2009 SB_{293}	—	September 26, 2009	Kitt Peak	Spacewatch	·	1.1 km	MPC · JPL
777943	2009 SF_{293}	—	September 26, 2009	Mount Lemmon	Mount Lemmon Survey	·	1.4 km	MPC · JPL
777944	2009 SV_{294}	—	September 17, 2009	Mount Lemmon	Mount Lemmon Survey	·	2.3 km	MPC · JPL
777945	2009 SG_{305}	—	September 17, 2009	Mount Lemmon	Mount Lemmon Survey	EUN	840 m	MPC · JPL
777946	2009 SZ_{308}	—	August 28, 2009	Kitt Peak	Spacewatch	HOF	2.1 km	MPC · JPL
777947	2009 SD_{309}	—	September 18, 2009	Mount Lemmon	Mount Lemmon Survey	·	2.4 km	MPC · JPL
777948	2009 SK_{311}	—	August 27, 2009	Kitt Peak	Spacewatch	·	1.4 km	MPC · JPL
777949	2009 SM_{311}	—	November 21, 2005	Kitt Peak	Spacewatch	(12739)	1.1 km	MPC · JPL
777950	2009 SO_{321}	—	September 21, 2009	Kitt Peak	Spacewatch	L4	5.8 km	MPC · JPL
777951	2009 SH_{323}	—	September 23, 2009	Mount Lemmon	Mount Lemmon Survey	·	1.6 km	MPC · JPL
777952	2009 SB_{324}	—	September 24, 2009	Mount Lemmon	Mount Lemmon Survey	HOF	1.6 km	MPC · JPL
777953	2009 SC_{328}	—	September 26, 2009	Kitt Peak	Spacewatch	·	1.6 km	MPC · JPL
777954	2009 SE_{332}	—	September 14, 2009	Catalina	CSS	·	1.9 km	MPC · JPL
777955	2009 SW_{335}	—	September 22, 2009	Kitt Peak	Spacewatch	GEF	740 m	MPC · JPL
777956	2009 SX_{338}	—	September 26, 2009	Kitt Peak	Spacewatch	KOR	1.0 km	MPC · JPL
777957	2009 SS_{346}	—	September 23, 2009	Kitt Peak	Spacewatch	·	1.3 km	MPC · JPL
777958	2009 SZ_{356}	—	September 20, 2009	Mount Lemmon	Mount Lemmon Survey	AEO	930 m	MPC · JPL
777959	2009 SN_{357}	—	September 22, 2009	Mount Lemmon	Mount Lemmon Survey	·	1.8 km	MPC · JPL
777960	2009 SN_{371}	—	September 21, 2009	Kitt Peak	Spacewatch	·	1.2 km	MPC · JPL
777961	2009 SY_{371}	—	September 27, 2009	Kitt Peak	Spacewatch	·	1.1 km	MPC · JPL
777962	2009 SO_{373}	—	September 27, 2009	Kitt Peak	Spacewatch	·	1.3 km	MPC · JPL
777963	2009 SV_{374}	—	September 24, 2013	Mount Lemmon	Mount Lemmon Survey	·	880 m	MPC · JPL
777964	2009 SR_{376}	—	October 8, 2015	Haleakala	Pan-STARRS 1	·	1.9 km	MPC · JPL
777965	2009 SC_{377}	—	September 18, 2009	Kitt Peak	Spacewatch	·	2.5 km	MPC · JPL
777966	2009 SZ_{377}	—	August 14, 2013	Haleakala	Pan-STARRS 1	EUN	1.1 km	MPC · JPL
777967	2009 SB_{378}	—	September 27, 2009	Mount Lemmon	Mount Lemmon Survey	·	1.9 km	MPC · JPL
777968	2009 SC_{378}	—	January 14, 2011	Mount Lemmon	Mount Lemmon Survey	·	1.6 km	MPC · JPL
777969	2009 SE_{379}	—	September 26, 2009	Kitt Peak	Spacewatch	·	1.4 km	MPC · JPL
777970	2009 ST_{379}	—	September 29, 2009	Mount Lemmon	Mount Lemmon Survey	·	1.6 km	MPC · JPL
777971	2009 SV_{379}	—	September 20, 2014	Haleakala	Pan-STARRS 1	·	1.5 km	MPC · JPL
777972	2009 SB_{380}	—	September 17, 2009	Kitt Peak	Spacewatch	·	1.5 km	MPC · JPL
777973	2009 SH_{383}	—	January 18, 2016	Haleakala	Pan-STARRS 1	·	1.4 km	MPC · JPL
777974	2009 SF_{384}	—	August 29, 2009	Kitt Peak	Spacewatch	·	1.7 km	MPC · JPL
777975	2009 ST_{384}	—	September 2, 2014	Haleakala	Pan-STARRS 1	BRA	970 m	MPC · JPL
777976	2009 SQ_{385}	—	October 1, 2014	Mount Lemmon	Mount Lemmon Survey	KOR	950 m	MPC · JPL
777977	2009 SH_{386}	—	November 17, 2014	Haleakala	Pan-STARRS 1	·	1.4 km	MPC · JPL
777978	2009 SB_{387}	—	September 19, 2009	Mount Lemmon	Mount Lemmon Survey	·	1.4 km	MPC · JPL
777979	2009 SD_{387}	—	September 17, 2009	Mount Lemmon	Mount Lemmon Survey	·	1.4 km	MPC · JPL
777980	2009 SG_{387}	—	September 23, 2009	Zelenchukskaya	T. V. Krjačko, B. Satovski	·	1.3 km	MPC · JPL
777981	2009 SL_{388}	—	September 18, 2009	Catalina	CSS	ADE	1.6 km	MPC · JPL
777982	2009 SN_{390}	—	January 12, 2011	Kitt Peak	Spacewatch	EMA	2.2 km	MPC · JPL
777983	2009 SQ_{390}	—	September 24, 2014	Mount Lemmon	Mount Lemmon Survey	·	1.6 km	MPC · JPL
777984	2009 SW_{392}	—	April 1, 2016	Haleakala	Pan-STARRS 1	GEF	830 m	MPC · JPL
777985	2009 SD_{393}	—	September 16, 2009	Kitt Peak	Spacewatch	·	1.0 km	MPC · JPL
777986	2009 SK_{394}	—	September 20, 2009	Kitt Peak	Spacewatch	·	1.3 km	MPC · JPL
777987	2009 SO_{394}	—	September 30, 2009	Mount Lemmon	Mount Lemmon Survey	GEF	940 m	MPC · JPL
777988	2009 SA_{395}	—	February 7, 2016	Mount Lemmon	Mount Lemmon Survey	HNS	770 m	MPC · JPL
777989	2009 SH_{395}	—	September 16, 2009	Kitt Peak	Spacewatch	·	1.2 km	MPC · JPL
777990	2009 SL_{395}	—	March 20, 2017	Haleakala	Pan-STARRS 1	·	1.4 km	MPC · JPL
777991	2009 SM_{395}	—	August 28, 2014	Haleakala	Pan-STARRS 1	·	1.6 km	MPC · JPL
777992	2009 SQ_{395}	—	December 5, 2016	Mount Lemmon	Mount Lemmon Survey	·	2.7 km	MPC · JPL
777993	2009 ST_{395}	—	February 22, 2017	Mount Lemmon	Mount Lemmon Survey	·	1.7 km	MPC · JPL
777994	2009 SR_{397}	—	September 29, 2009	Mount Lemmon	Mount Lemmon Survey	·	1.4 km	MPC · JPL
777995	2009 SQ_{398}	—	September 28, 2009	Mount Lemmon	Mount Lemmon Survey	·	1.3 km	MPC · JPL
777996	2009 SZ_{398}	—	September 25, 2009	Kitt Peak	Spacewatch	·	1.5 km	MPC · JPL
777997	2009 SD_{402}	—	September 21, 2009	Mount Lemmon	Mount Lemmon Survey	·	2.2 km	MPC · JPL
777998	2009 SE_{402}	—	September 25, 2009	Mount Lemmon	Mount Lemmon Survey	·	1.3 km	MPC · JPL
777999	2009 SJ_{402}	—	September 27, 2009	Mount Lemmon	Mount Lemmon Survey	L4	5.8 km	MPC · JPL
778000	2009 SS_{402}	—	September 21, 2009	Mount Lemmon	Mount Lemmon Survey	·	1.4 km	MPC · JPL

back to top

== Meaning of names ==
As minor planet discoveries are confirmed, they are given a permanent number by the IAU's Minor Planet Center (MPC), and the discoverers can then submit names for them, following the IAU's naming conventions. The list below concerns those minor planets in the specified number-range that have received names, and explains the meanings of those names.

Official naming citations of newly named small Solar System bodies are approved and published in a bulletin by IAU's Working Group for Small Bodies Nomenclature (WGSBN). Before May 2021, citations were published in MPC's Minor Planet Circulars for many decades. Recent citations can also be found on the JPL Small-Body Database (SBDB). Until his death in 2016, German astronomer Lutz D. Schmadel compiled these citations into the Dictionary of Minor Planet Names (DMP) and regularly updated the collection.

Based on Paul Herget's The Names of the Minor Planets, Schmadel also researched the unclear origin of numerous asteroids, most of which had been named prior to World War II. This article incorporates text from this source, which is in the public domain: SBDB New namings may only be added to this list below after official publication as the preannouncement of names is condemned. The WGSBN publishes a comprehensive guideline for the naming rules of non-cometary small Solar System bodies.

Named minor planet	Provisional	This minor planet was named for...	Ref · Catalog
777018 Huangchunming	2008 QG_{33}	Huang Chun-ming, celebrated Taiwanese writer and playwright whose works vividly depict everyday life and social change.	IAU · 777018
