= Huang Chun-ming =

Taiwanese writer

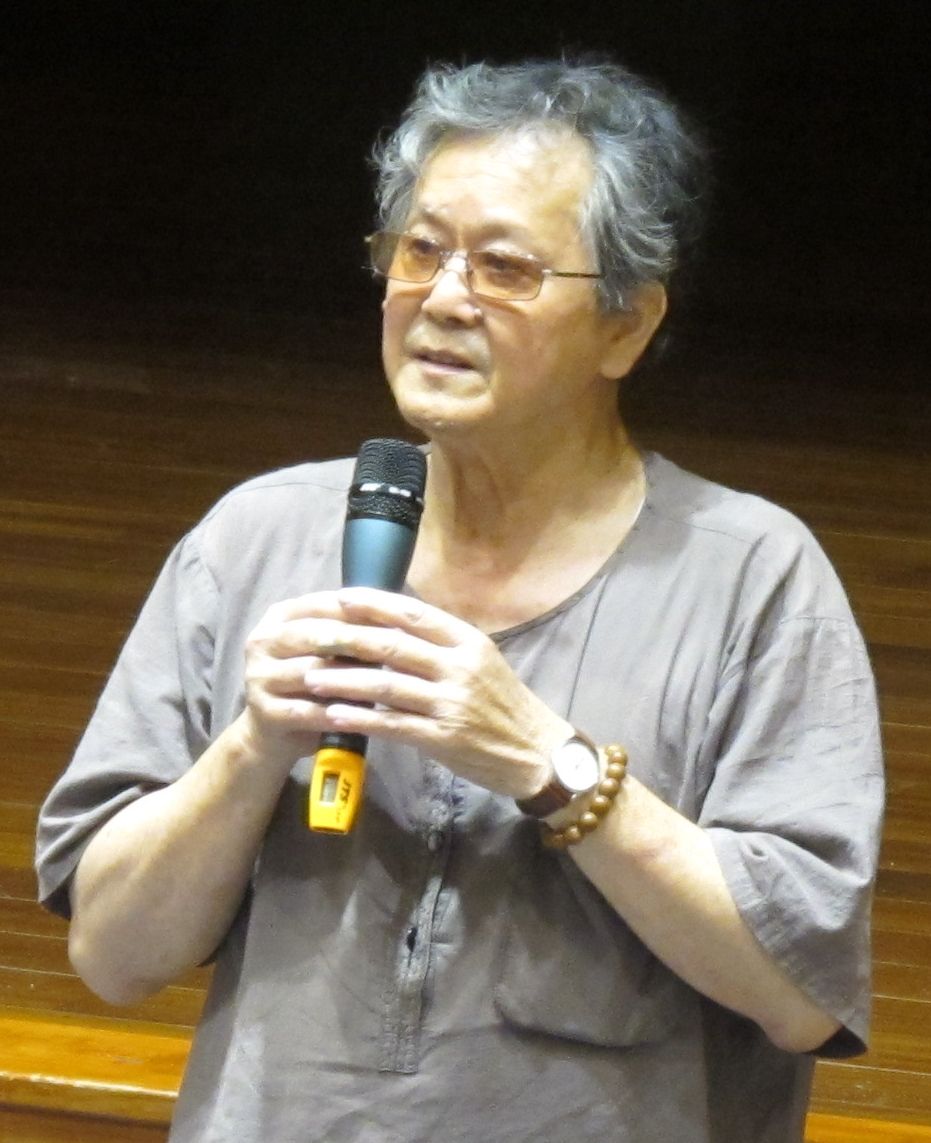
Huang Chun-ming

Huang Chun-ming (Chinese: 黃春明; born 13 February 1935) is a Taiwanese literary figure and teacher. Huang writes mainly about the tragic and sometimes humorous lives of ordinary Taiwanese people, and many of his short stories have been turned into films, including The Sandwich Man (1983).

== Career ==
Born in Ratō Town, Taihoku Prefecture, Japanese Taiwan (modern-day Luodong, Yilan, Taiwan), Huang began his higher education career at a college in Taipei but, after a series of transfers, ended up graduating from National Pingtung University of Education in southern Taiwan.

Huang recalled in an interview that during his time at the National Taipei University of Education, he first encountered Professor Chen Hsueh-ping, who had come to deliver a lecture. The speech left a deep impression on Huang, and he later sought Chen out after being expelled from the university for assaulting a campus security guard. In distress, Huang rushed to Chen’s office to confide in him. Chen, moved by Huang’s honesty and remorse, wrote him a letter of recommendation that enabled Huang to transfer to Tainan Normal School.

He is a writer of broad interests and varied interests, but he is primarily a short story writer. During the 1960s as a contributor to the Literature Quarterly, Huang was associated with the Taiwan Nativist Literature movement that focused on the lives of rural Taiwanese people. In more recent works he has turned his attention to urban culture and life in Taiwan's growing cities.

Starting in the 1990s, he established and has written for and directed the Big Fish Children's Theater Troupe (黃大魚兒童劇團). Huang was awarded the National Cultural Award for Literature in 1997.

He opened a cafe and salon in his native Yilan, operating it for three years before closing it in December 2015.

== Influences ==
Huang has said that in his early years he had limited access to literature in Chinese and that significant influences were Ernest Hemingway's The Old Man and the Sea and "The Killers"; Mark Twain's Tom Sawyer, Adventures of Huckleberry Finn, and "The Celebrated Jumping Frog of Calaveras County"; William Faulkner's "A Rose for Emily," "The Bear," The Wild Palms, and other American literature. Two other important influences were an anthology of short stories by Shen Congwen and a Chinese translation of stories by Anton Chekhov.

== English translations ==
The major translation of Huang's work into English is The Taste of Apples (Howard Goldblatt trans). New York: Columbia University Press, 2001. (The Taste of Apples was previously published in a slightly different form as The Drowning of an Old Cat and Other Stories, (Howard Goldblatt trans.). Bloomington: Indiana University Press, 1980.)

Alternate translations of individual stories in the Taste of Apples collection are shown in the associated article.

Other English language translations of Huang's work (found at http://mclc.osu.edu/rc/bib.htm):

"Ah-Ban and the Cop." Tr. Howard Goldblatt. The Chinese Pen (Summer, 1981): 94-98.

"Father's Writings Have Been Republished, Or, The Sexuality of Women Students in a Taipei Bookstore." Tr. Raymond N. Tang. In Helmut Martin, ed., Modern Chinese Writers: Self-portrayals. Armonk, NY: M.E. Sharpe, 1992, 204-208.

"A Flower in the Rainy Night." Tr. Earl Wieman. In Joseph S.M. Lau, ed., Chinese Stories From Taiwan: 1960-1970. NY: Columbia UP, 1976, 195-241.

"Hung T'ung, the Mad Artist." Tr. Jack Langlois. In Wai-lim Yip, ed., Chinese Arts and Literature: A Survey of Recent Trends. Occasional Papers/Reprint Series in Contemporary Asian Studies. Baltimore, 1977, 117-26.

"I Love Mary." Tr. Howard Goldblatt. In Joseph S.M. Lau, ed., The Unbroken Chain: An Anthology of Taiwan Fiction Since 1926. Bloomington: IUP, 1983, 133-74.

"Waiting for a Flower's Name" [Dengdai yiduo hua de mingzi]. Tr. David Pollard. In Pollard, ed., The Chinese Essay. NY: Columbia UP, 2000, 345-49.

"We Cant' Bring Back the Past" [Wangshi zhi neng huimei]. Tr. David Pollard. In Pollard, ed., The Chinese Essay. NY: Columbia UP, 2000, 340-45.

"Young Widow." In Rosemary Haddon, tr./ed, Oxcart: Nativist Stories from Taiwan, 1934-1977. Dortmund: Projekt Verlag, 1996, 221-304.

== See also ==
- His Son's Big Doll

== Portrait ==
- Huang Chunming. A Portrait by Kong Kai Ming at Portrait Gallery of Chinese Writers (Hong Kong Baptist University Library).
