= The Taste of Apples =

Book by Huang Chunming

Taste of Apples (traditional Chinese: 兒子的大玩偶; simplified Chinese: 儿子的大玩偶) is a collection of short stories by the Taiwanese writer Huang Chunming. The English translation is by Howard Goldblatt and was published in 2001 by Columbia University Press.

An earlier version of Goldblatt's translations was published by Indiana University under the title The Drowning of an Old Cat and Other Stories in 1980.

== Subject matter and major themes ==
Huang Chunming's subject matter is the people of Taiwan. One aspect of their lives that his stories treat is the way in which their lives contrast with Mainlanders and Mainland culture. An important theme is the influence of language (Taiwanese Hokkien vs. Mandarin Chinese) on keeping these two groups of people distinct.

A related theme is change and the impact of modernity. Huang Chunming wrote in the introduction to the English translation, "In the sixties and seventies, when the modern world began making inroads into the out-of-the-way town of Lanyang, where I was born, the conflicts between the new and the old created a rich source of powerful and dramatic material. Whenever my antennae detected the new dramas being played out in my hometown, the desire to write about them raged inside me."

== Motifs ==
Huang Chunming's characters are native Taiwanese fishermen and villagers, and often have Taiwan's trademark "Ah" prefix on their names. His stories are full of neighborhood temples and folk religion observances, banyan trees, bonito fish, sparrows and sweet potatoes, and the blazing tropical sun is a prop in nearly every story. His characters often exhibit strong and even mystical attachment to their natural surroundings, including explicit expressions of fengshui ideas.

== Story synopses ==
=== The Fish ===
This story provides a glimpse into the nuanced interactions between a grandfather from a Taiwan mountain village and his teenage grandson, who is coming of age and gaining experience of the larger world.

=== The Drowning of an Old Cat ===
A typical band of Huang Chunming characters, all in their 70s—Uncle Cow's Eye, Uncle Earthworm, Uncle Yuzai, and Uncle Ah-zhuan, led by Uncle Ah-sheng—venture forth from their usual hangout (the neighborhood temple, in the shade of the banyan tree) to challenge the coming of a modern swimming pool to their rural town. They represent barriers to translational activities that are ongoing in China by this period.

=== His Son's Big Doll ===
This story probes the roiling thoughts and emotions of an impoverished man as he juggles the challenges of his humiliating job as a "sandwich man" with the desire to support his young wife and child.

The story provides an example of quintessential Huang Chunming narrative: unadorned observation of the fundamental human condition ("They seemed to shed a heavy emotional burden simultaneously -- he having seen his wife walk through the door, she having seen her husband drink some tea") juxtaposed with wry examples of the incongruity and provocativeness of modernizing Taiwan (the protagonist's occupation is "sandwich-man" or "ad man" - shouldering billboards for a movie theater and dressed in the costume of a nineteenth-century European military officer").

The story was adapted into a film entitled The Sandwich Man directed by Hou Hsiao-hsien.

=== The Gong ===
This story is an empathetic account of an old, derelict, and hungry man. The two main threads of the story are the man's loss of employment as a town crier (complete with attention-getting gong) due to the advent of more modern forms of communication, and the man's reluctant entry into a company of funeral followers. The story realistically captures the twin torments of his material desperation and his ambivalence about his new "friends."

The group that the man falls in with—the arhat vagrants—is a classic collection of down-on-their-luck locals: Scabby Head, Turtle, Know-It-All, Fire Baby, Blockhead, One-Eye, Gold Clock. They hang out under a tree across from the coffinmaker's shop, waiting to be called upon to assist at funerals.

=== Ringworms ===
This brief story describes a few hours in the life of a low-class husband and wife in Taiwan, together with their gaggle of children. Their concerns range from day-to-day subsistence, how to snatch some brief moments of intimacy, and how to broach touchy subjects like birth control.

=== The Taste of Apples ===
For a native Taiwan man who has migrated with his family to the urban north of Taiwan, everything changes when he gets hit by an American military officer.

The apples the family eats in the hospital symbolize the instantaneous change in circumstances: a heretofore unaffordable luxury in the Taiwanese context will now be a commonplace as their lives are touched by the American presence.

=== Xiaoqi's Cap ===
This story involves two greenhorn salesmen, one of whom has a "bad attitude" which rapidly evolves in the course of events.

The story includes elements that can be read as metaphors for the social situation in Taiwan: a pressure cooker that explodes and a cap that disguises disfiguring marks on an innocent little girl's head.

=== The Two Sign Painters ===
Two rural men have migrated to the city and now find themselves working on towering buildings. Their suddenly heightened visual perspective is complicated further when they become the center of official and media attention and get a taste of "all news, all the time" culture . . . .

=== Sayonara / Zaijian ===
This story concerns a Taiwanese trading company employee who must act as a "pimp" in the course of entertaining visiting businessmen from Japan who want to visit a hot spring hotel.

The story addresses wide-ranging feelings of ambivalence and confusion in a society that has a complicated history of relations with Japan, and is experiencing rapidly changing mores.

In a tour-de-force of imaginative dialog writing, Huang Chunming describes how the Taiwanese man avails himself of artiful use of language to simultaneously humble the group of visiting Japanese businessmen and to upbraid a misguided Chinese literature student.
