= Tu Duu-chih =

Taiwanese sound engineer (born 1955)

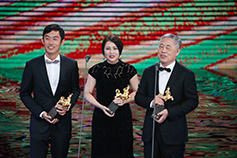
- Tu duu chih at third
- Born: April 5, 1955 (age 71); Taipei
- Occupation: Sound designer

Tu Duu-chih (Chinese: 杜篤之, born April 1, 1955) is a Taiwanese sound designer. He is credited for introducing synchronized sound to Taiwanese film and is known for his collaborations with directors Edward Yang, Hou Hsiao-hsien, and Wong Kar-wai.

== Early life and education ==
Born April 5, 1955, in Taipei, Tu entered the Central Motion Picture Corporation Film Technicians Training Program in 1973.

== Career ==
In 1978, Tu was hired to the Central Motion Picture Corporation sound department as an assistant sound engineer.

Tu was instrumental in introducing synchronized sound to Taiwanese cinema. His first project to utilize the technique was a short government-sponsored film directed by Edward Yang. He later served as the sound editor on the first feature filmed entirely with synchronized sound, the 1989 Hou Hsiao-hsien picture A City of Sadness.

A 2001 Taipei Times article stated that Tu acted as the sound editor for 70 percent of Taiwanese films released since the 1980s.

In 2004, Tu founded 3H Sound Studio, an audio production company.

== Filmography ==
=== Film ===
Year	Title	Notes
1982	In Our Time	—N/a
1982	The Winter of 1905	—N/a
1982	Ku Lian	—N/a
1983	Growing Up	—N/a
1983	That Day, on the Beach	—N/a
1983	The Boys from Fengkuei	—N/a
1984	You ma cai zi	—N/a
1984	A Summer at Grandpa's	—N/a
1984	Wo ai Mali	—N/a
1986	Taipei Story	—N/a
1986	Ce ma ru lin	—N/a
1986	Chao ji shi min	—N/a
1986	A Time to Live and a Time to Die	—N/a
1986	Kuei-mei, a Woman	—N/a
1986	Yang chun lao ba	—N/a
1986	The Terrorizers	—N/a
1986	This Love of Mine	—N/a
1988	Yuan nu	—N/a
1988	Huang se gu shi	—N/a
1989	A City of Sadness	—N/a
1990	A Home Too Far	—N/a
1991	A Brighter Summer Day	—N/a
1991	Qingchun wu hi	—N/a
1992	Dust of Angels	—N/a
1992	Secret Love in Peach Blossom Land	—N/a
1993	The Puppetmaster	—N/a
1993	Green Green Leaves of Home	—N/a
1994	A Confucian Confusion	—N/a
1994	The Red Lotus Society	—N/a
1994	May Jane	Credited as Du-Jy Du
1995	Heartbreak Island	—N/a
1995	Good Men, Good Women	—N/a
1995	The Peony Pavilion	—N/a
1996	Mahjong	—N/a
1996	Goodbye South, Goodbye	—N/a
1996	Tai ping tian guo	—N/a
1997	Sweet Degeneration	—N/a
1997	A Queer Story	—N/a
1997	Gei tao wang zhe de qia qia	—N/a
1997	Happy Together	—N/a
1997	Guo dao feng bi	—N/a
1998	Hold You Tight	—N/a
1998	The Candidate	Post-production sound
1999	3 ju zhi lian	—N/a
2000	The Island Tales	—N/a
2000	Xiang si chen xianzai	—N/a
2000	Yi Yi	—N/a
2000	In the Mood for Love	—N/a
2000	Pure Accidents	—N/a
2000	The Cabbie	—N/a
2001	Betelnut Beauty	—N/a
2001	Beijing Bicycle	—N/a
2001	Ming dai zhui zhu	—N/a
2001	What Time Is It There?	—N/a
2001	Millennium Mambo	—N/a
2001	Visible Secret	—N/a
2001	Hou niao	—N/a
2001	Ren jian xi ju	—N/a
2002	Wa dong ren	—N/a
2002	July Rhapsody	—N/a
2002	Princess D	—N/a
2002	Ai qing ling yao	—N/a
2002	Kong zhong hua yuan	—N/a
2002	Double Vision	—N/a
2002	Blue Gate Crossing	—N/a
2002	Visible Secret II	—N/a
2002	Demi-Haunted	—N/a
2002	Twenty Something Taipei	—N/a
2002	Fancy 25	—N/a
2002	Brave 20	—N/a
2002	Voice of Waves	—N/a
2002	My Whispering Plan	—N/a
2003	How High Is the Mountain?	—N/a
2003	Er di	—N/a
2003	Goodbye, Dragon Inn	—N/a
2003	The Missing	—N/a
2003	Café Lumière	—N/a
2004	20:30:40	—N/a
2004	2046	—N/a
2004	Love of May	—N/a
2004	Eros	"The Hand" segment
2004	Meng you xia wei yi	—N/a
2004	Da xuan min	—N/a
2005	About Love	Taipei segment
2005	The Wayward Cloud	—N/a
2005	Three Times	—N/a
2005	Ai yu yong qi	—N/a
2005	Lian ren	—N/a
2005	Hu gu po	—N/a
2005	Ai li si de jing zi	—N/a
2006	Silk	—N/a
2006	Do Over	—N/a
2006	Shen you qing ren	—N/a
2006	I Don't Want to Sleep Alone	—N/a
2006	Tai yang yue	—N/a
2006	The Postmodern Life of My Aunt	—N/a
2006	Qi ji de xia tian	—N/a
2006	My Mother is a Belly Dancer	—N/a
2006	Eternal Summer	—N/a
2006	Cha Tian Shan zhi ge	—N/a
2006	Exit No. 6	Supervising sound editor
2006	Island Etude	—N/a
2006	Song shu zi sha shi jian	—N/a
2006	Drifting Paradise	—N/a
2007	Spider Lilies	—N/a
2007	The Most Distant Course	—N/a
2007	Chuan qiang ren	—N/a
2007	Secret	Final mixer
2007	The Drummer	—N/a
2007	Help Me, Eros	—N/a
2007	Shen xuan zhe	Supervising sound editor
2007	What on Earth Have I Done Wrong?!	—N/a
2007	I Wish	—N/a
2008	Kung Fu Dunk	—N/a
2008	Drifting Flowers	—N/a
2008	Candy Rain	—N/a
2008	Run Papa Run	—N/a
2008	The Way We Are	—N/a
2008	Artemisia	Supervising sound designer
2008	Dou cha	—N/a
2008	Cape No. 7	Final mixer
2008	Ballistic	Sound mixer
2008	Miao Miao	—N/a
2008	Xiong mei	—N/a
2008	Tibet, Taipei	—N/a
2009	Dui bu qi wo ai ni	—N/a
2009	Yang Yang	—N/a
2009	Finding Shangri-La	—N/a
2009	Night and Fog	—N/a
2009	Miss Kicki	—N/a
2009	Sham moh	—N/a
2009	Hear Me	—N/a
2009	Prince of Tears	—N/a
2009	Pinoy Sunday	—N/a
2009	Torocco	—N/a
2009	The Treasure Hunter	—N/a
2010	Monga	—N/a
2010	One Day	—N/a
2010	Love in a Puff	—N/a
2010	Seven Days in Heaven	Final mixer
2010	Dream Home	—N/a
2010	Taipei Exchanges	—N/a
2010	Love in Disguise	—N/a
2010	The Fourth Portrait	—N/a
2010	All About Love	—N/a
2010	Buddha Mountain	—N/a
2010	Once Upon a Time in Tibet	—N/a
2010	The Long Goodbye	—N/a
2010	Road to the Ghost Horse	—N/a
2011	Night Market Hero	—N/a
2011	Goodbye May	—N/a
2011	Return Ticket	—N/a
2011	Make Up	—N/a
2011	Honey PuPu	—N/a
2011	You Are the Apple of My Eye	—N/a
2011	Warriors of the Rainbow: Seediq Bale	—N/a
2011	A Simple Life	—N/a
2011	Mayday 3DNA	—N/a
2011	Mural	Sound mixer
2011	Lovesick	—N/a
2011	Starry Starry Night	—N/a
2011	10+10	"Something's Gotta Give" and "The Orphans" segments
2011	Dian Na Cha	—N/a
2011	Road Less Traveled	—N/a
2011	Great Wall, My Love	Sound mixer
2012	The Soul of Bread	—N/a
2012	Love	—N/a
2012	Father's Lullaby	—N/a
2012	Love in the Buff	—N/a
2012	Joyful Reunion	—N/a
2012	The Third Wish	—N/a
2012	The Bird Who Saved the World	—N/a
2012	Melody	—N/a
2012	Double Trouble	—N/a
2012	Girlfriend Boyfriend	—N/a
2012	The Fierce Wife Final Episode	—N/a
2012	Double Xposure	Sound mixer
2012	When a Wolf Falls in Love with a Sheep	—N/a
2012	Legend of the T-Dog	Credited as Du Du-Zhi
2013	A ma de meng zhong qing ren	—N/a
2013	The Stolen Years	—N/a
2013	Young Style	—N/a
2013	Tiny Times	—N/a
2013	Soul	Re-recording mixer
2013	The Rooftop	—N/a
2013	Bridge Over Troubled Water	Sound effect director
2013	27°C: Loaf Rock	—N/a
2013	Tiny Times 2.0	—N/a
2013	Stray Dogs	—N/a
2013	Silent Witness	—N/a
2013	Ting jian xia yu de sheng yin	—N/a
2013	Takao Dancer	—N/a
2013	Love Transplantation	—N/a
2013	Twelve Nights	Sound supervisor
2014	Sweet Alibis	—N/a
2014	The Journey	—N/a
2014	Women Who Flirt	—N/a
2014	Kano	—N/a
2014	Aberdeen	—N/a
2014	Partners in Crime	—N/a
2014	Meeting Dr. Sun	—N/a
2014	Girls	—N/a
2014	Taipei Factory II	"Soap Opera" segment
2014	Flowers of Taipei: Taiwan New Cinema	—N/a
2014	Paradise in Service	—N/a
2014	The Golden Era	—N/a
2014	(Sex) Appeal	—N/a
2014	Five Minutes to Tomorrow	—N/a
2014	Live at Love	—N/a
2014	Elena	—N/a
2014	It Takes Two to Tango	—N/a
2014	The Crossing	—N/a
2015	Time Is Money	—N/a
2015	The Wonderful Wedding	Audio post-production
2015	Kepong Gangster 2	—N/a
2015	Murmur of the Hearts	—N/a
2015	The Queens	—N/a
2015	First of May	—N/a
2015	Baby Steps	—N/a
2015	The Assassin	Sound mixer
2015	Our Times	—N/a
2015	Wawa No Cidal	—N/a
2015	Zinnia Flower	—N/a
2015	The Crossing 2	—N/a
2015	Fly, Kite Fly	—N/a
2015	Office	—N/a
2015	All You Need is Love	—N/a
2015	Underground Fragrance	—N/a
2015	Taste of Life	—N/a
2015	Go Lala Go 2	—N/a
2016	Ola Bola	—N/a
2016	Rookie Chef	—N/a
2016	City of Jade	—N/a
2016	Dog Days	—N/a
2016	Hang in There, Kids!	—N/a
2016	Heaven in the Dark	—N/a
2016	New York New York	—N/a
2016	At Cafe 6	—N/a
2016	The Tenants Downstairs	—N/a
2016	Go! Crazy Gangster	Sound mixer
2016	Hai de bi duan	Sound mixer
2016	Hema Hema	—N/a
2016	The Road to Mandalay	—N/a
2016	Mrs K	—N/a
2016	Shed Skin Papa	—N/a
2017	52Hz, I Love You	—N/a
2017	Barkley	—N/a
2017	Xian yi ren X de xian shen	—N/a
2017	Love Off the Cuff	—N/a
2017	The Mysterious Family	—N/a
2017	Mon Mon Mon Monsters	—N/a
2017	You Mean the World to Me	—N/a
2017	God of War	—N/a
2017	Shuttle Life	—N/a
2017	Our Time Will Come	—N/a
2017	The Great Buddha+	—N/a
2017	Secret Fruit	—N/a
2017	The Taste of Rice Flower	—N/a
2017	Manhunt	—N/a
2017	Never-Ending Road	—N/a
2017	The White Girl	—N/a
2017	The Bold, the Corrupt, and the Beautiful	—N/a
2017	Love Education	—N/a
2017	Seventy-Seven Days	—N/a
2017	Take Me to the Moon	—N/a
2017	Back to the Good Times	—N/a
2018	Gatao 2: Rise of the King	Supervising sound editor
2018	Xiao Mei	—N/a
2018	About Youth	—N/a
2018	Us and Them	—N/a
2018	Suburban Birds	—N/a
2018	Cities of Last Things	—N/a
2018	Baby	—N/a
2018	Tracey	Supervising sound editor
2018	G Affairs	—N/a
2019	Han Dan	—N/a
2019	Spring Tide	—N/a
2019	Love the Way You Are	—N/a
2019	A Fool in Love, Love Like a Fool	—N/a
2019	Little Q	—N/a
2019	Balloon	—N/a
2019	Lunana: A Yak in the Classroom	—N/a
2019	Looking for a Lady with Fangs and a Moustache	Re-recording mixer
2019	Beyond the Dream	—N/a
2019	Wo de ling hun shi ai zuo de	Supervising sound editor
2019	Gone with the Light	—N/a
2020	Your Name Engraved Herein	—N/a
2020	Whale Island	—N/a
2020	A Little Bird Reminds Me	—N/a
2020	The Rope Curse 2	—N/a
2020	Love After Love	—N/a
2020	A Leg	—N/a
2020	Precious Is the Night	—N/a
2021	I Missed You	Supervising sound editors
2021	Are You Lonesome Tonight?	Re-recording mixer
2021	Before Next Spring	—N/a
2021	Ripples of Life	—N/a
2021	The Falls	—N/a
2021	Terrorizers	—N/a
2021	Anita	—N/a
2021	American Girl	—N/a
2022	My Best Friend's Breakfast	—N/a
2022	Stay with Me	—N/a
2022	Where the Wind Blows	—N/a
2022	Hong Kong Family	—N/a
2022	Divine Factory	—N/a
2022	Lost Leaf	—N/a
2023	Ma, I Love You	—N/a
2023	Abang Adik	—N/a
2023	Monkey King - Rebirth	—N/a
2023	Only the River Flows	—N/a
2023	The Settlers	—N/a
2023	The Monk and the Gun	—N/a
2023	Snow in Midsummer	—N/a
2024	All Shall Be Well	—N/a
2024	Dormir De Olhos Abertos	Re-recording mixer
2024	Shambhala	—N/a

=== Television ===
Year	Title	Notes
1981	Duckweed	TV movie
1996	Cinéma, de notre temps	1 episode
2004	My Stinking Kid	TV movie
2015	Legend of Sound	TV movie
2021	The Magician on the Skywalk	10 episodes

== Awards and nominations ==
=== Golden Horse Awards ===
Awards presented at the annual Golden Horse Film Festival and Awards.

Year	Category	Nominated work	Result	Ref.
1984	Best Sound Recording	Kendo Kids	Nominated	
1985	Best Sound Recording	Super Citizen Ko	Won	
1986	Best Sound Recording	My Love	Nominated	
1989	Best Sound Effects	A City of Sadness	Nominated	
1991	Best Sound Recording	A Brighter Summer Day	Nominated	
1992	Best Sound Recording	Dust of Angels	Won	
1992	Best Sound Effects	The Peach Blossom Land	Nominated	
1993	Best Sound Recording	Green, Green Leaves of Home	Nominated	
1993	Best Sound Recording	The Puppetmaster	Won	
1994	Best Sound Effects	A Borrowed Life	Nominated	
1994	Best Sound Effects	A Confucian Confusion	Nominated	
1995	Best Sound Effects	Super Citizen Ko	Nominated	
1995	Best Sound Effects	Good Men, Good Women	Nominated	
1997	Best Sound Effects	Happy Together	Nominated	
1999	Best Sound Effects	Ordinary Heroes	Nominated	
2000	Best Sound Effects	Feeling by Night	Nominated	
2001	Best Sound Effects	What Time is it There?	Nominated	
2001	Best Sound Effects	Millennium Mambo	Won	
2002	Best Sound Effects	Double Vision	Nominated	
2003	Best Sound Effects	Goodbye, Dragon Inn	Nominated	
2004	Best Sound Effects	Sacrificial Victims	Nominated	
2004	Best Sound Effects	2046	Nominated	
2006	Best Sound Effects	Amour - Legende	Won	
2007	Best Sound Effects	The Most Distance	Won	
2008	Best Sound Effects	Cape No. 7	Nominated	
2009	Best Sound Effects	Like a Dream	Nominated	
2009	Best Sound Effects	Yang Yang	Nominated	
2010	Best Sound Effects	MONGA	Won	
2011	Best Sound Effects	Warriors of the Rainbow: Seediq Bale	Won	
2013	Best Sound Effects	Stray Dogs	Nominated	
2013	Best Sound Effects	Soul	Won	
2014	Best Sound Effects	Paradise in Service	Nominated	
2015	Best Sound Effects	Office	Nominated	
2015	Best Sound Effects	The Assassin	Won	
2017	Best Sound Effects	The Great Buddha+	Nominated	
2017	Best Sound Effects	Mon Mon Mon Monsters!	Won	
2020	Best Sound Effects	Beyond the Dream	Nominated	
2021	Best Sound Effects	Terrorizers	Nominated	
2022	Best Sound Effects	Coo-Coo 043	Nominated	
2023	Best Sound Effects	A BOY AND A GIRL	Nominated	
2023	Best Sound Effects	Snow in Midsummer	Won	

=== Cannes Film Festival ===
Year	Category	Nominated work	Result	Ref.
2001	Technical Grand Prize	Millennium Mambo	Won	
2001	Technical Grand Prize	What Time is it There?	Won	

=== Asia-Pacific Film Festival ===
Year	Category	Nominated work	Result	Ref.
1997	Best Sound	A Cha-Cha for the Fugitive	Won	
2010	Best Sound	Torocco	Won	
2012	Best Sound	Girlfriend Boyfriend	Nominated	
2013	Best Sound	Stray Dogs	Won (Note: Shared with Kuo Li-chi)	

=== Hong Kong Film Awards ===
Year	Category	Nominated work	Result	Ref.
2002	Best Sound Design	Visible Secret	Nominated	
2005	Best Sound Design	2046	Nominated (Note: Shared with Claude Letessier)	
2008	Best Sound Design	The Drummer	Nominated	
2011	Best Sound Design	Dream Home	Nominated	
2015	Best Sound Design	The Crossing	Won	
2016	Best Sound Design	Office	Nominated (Note: Shared with David Richardson and Wu Shu-yao)	
2018	Best Sound Design	Our Time Will Come	Nominated (Note: Shared with Wu Shu-yao)	
2019	Best Sound Design	G Affairs	Nominated	
2020	Best Sound Design	Fagara	Nominated (Note: Shared with Chiang Yi-chen)	
2020	Best Sound Design	Beyond the Dream	Nominated	
2022	Best Sound Design	Anita	Won	
2023	Best Sound Design	Where the Wind Blows	Nominated	
2023	Best Sound Design	The Sparring Partner	Nominated	

=== Taipei Film Awards ===
Year	Category	Nominated work	Result	Ref.
2019	Best Sound Design	Cities of Last Things	Won (Note: Shared with Chiang Yi-chen)	
2023	Best Sound Design	Coo-Coo 043	Nominated	
2023	Best Sound Design	A Place Called Silence	Nominated	
