= List of Taiwanese films of the 1980s =

This is a list of films produced in Taiwan ordered by year of release. For an alphabetical list of Taiwanese films see Category:Taiwanese films

== 1980 ==
| Title | Director | Cast | Genre | Notes |
|---|---|---|---|---|
| Attack Force Z | Tim Burstall | John Phillip Law, Ko Chun-hsiung, Mel Gibson, Sylvia Chang | war drama | First Australian Taiwanese co-production |
| Cute Girl | Hou Hsiao-hsien | Kenny Bee, Fong Fei Fei | drama/comedy | Hou's first full-length feature film |

== 1981 ==
| Title | Director | Cast | Genre | Notes |
|---|---|---|---|---|
| Cheerful Wind | Hou Hsiao-hsien | Kenny Bee, Fong Fei Fei | drama/comedy | |

== 1982 ==
| Title | Director | Cast | Genre | Notes |
|---|---|---|---|---|
| In Our Time | Tao Decheng, Edward Yang, Ko I-chen, Chang Yi | Sylvia Chang | drama/comedy | A Taiwanese New Wave collection of film shorts |
| The Green, Green Grass of Home | Hou Hsiao-hsien | Kenny Bee | drama/comedy | |

== 1983 ==
| Title | Director | Cast | Genre | Notes |
|---|---|---|---|---|
| Growing Up | Chen Kunhou | Doze Niu | drama | |
| Papa, Can You Hear Me Sing | Yu Kanping | Sun Yueh | drama | |
| The Sandwich Man | Hou Hsiao-hsien, Tseng chuang-hsiang, Wan Ren | | drama | A Taiwanese New Wave collection of film shorts |
| The Boys from Fengkuei | Hou Hsiao-hsien | Doze Niu, Tou Chung-hua, Shih Chang | drama | Won the Golden Montgolfiere at the 1984 Nantes Three Continents Festival |
| That Day, on the Beach | Edward Yang | Sylvia Chang | drama | |

== 1984 ==
| Title | Director | Cast | Genre | Notes |
|---|---|---|---|---|
| A Summer at Grandpa's | Hou Hsiao-hsien | | drama | Won the Golden Montgolfiere at the 1985 Nantes Three Continents Festival |

== 1985 ==
| Title | Director | Cast | Genre | Notes |
|---|---|---|---|---|
| A Time to Live, A Time to Die | Hou Hsiao-hsien | | drama/biography | Won the FIPRESCI Prize Forum of New Cinema at the 1986 Berlin International Film Festival |
| Taipei Story | Edward Yang | Hou Hsiao-hsien, Tsai Chin | drama | |
| Kuei-mei, A Woman | Chang Yi | Hui-san Yang | drama | |

== 1986 ==
| Title | Director | Cast | Genre | Notes |
|---|---|---|---|---|
| A Book of Heroes | Kevin Chu | Cynthia Luster, Shoji Karada | martial arts | Renamed Fight to Win Again for its August 1987 release in the Philippines |
| Dust in the Wind | Hou Hsiao-hsien | Li Tian-lu | drama | |
| Terrorizers | Edward Yang | | drama | Won the Silver Leopard at the Locarno International Film Festival |

== 1987 ==
| Title | Director | Cast | Genre | Notes |
|---|---|---|---|---|
| Daughter of the Nile | Hou Hsiao-hsien | Jack Kao, Li Tian-lu, Lin Yang | drama | Won the Special Jury Prize at the 1987 Torino International Festival of Young Cinema |
| Strawman | Wang Tung | Kuei-mei Yang, Wen Ying | drama | |
| The Game They Called Sex | Gam Gwok-Chiu, Wong Siu-Dai, Sylvia Chang | Maggie Cheung, David Wu, Wakin Chau | Romance | |

== 1988 ==
| Title | Director | Cast | Genre | Notes |
|---|---|---|---|---|
| Osmanthus Alley | Chen Kunhou | Simon Yam, Wakin Chau, Tou Chung-hua | Drama | |
| Autumn Tempest | Huang Yu-shan | | Drama | |
| The Ginseng King | Chu-Chin Wang | Cynthia Khan | Fantasy | |

== 1989 ==
| Title | Director | Cast | Genre | Notes |
|---|---|---|---|---|
| A City of Sadness | Hou Hsiao-hsien | Tony Leung Chiu Wai, Chen Sung-young, Li Tian-lu | drama | Won the Golden Lion award at the 1989 Venice Film Festival, the Best Director at Golden Horse Awards |
| Banana Paradise | Wang Tung | Doze Niu, Shih Chang | drama | |
| The Dull Ice Flower | Yang Li Kuo | Huang Kun Hsuan, Lee Shu Chen, Chen Sung-young | drama | Screened at the 1989 Berlin International Film Festival |
| Twin Bracelets | Huang Yu-shan | | Drama | |
