= Chou Pin-chun =

Taiwanese actor

Chou Pin-chin (Chinese: 周品君) is a Taiwanese former actor.

Chou's film debut in Hou Hsiao-hsien's The Green, Green Grass of Home (1982), saw him portray a child with a limp. He was the Best Child Actor at the 19th Golden Horse Awards.
