= Lim Giong =

Taiwanese musician (born 1964)

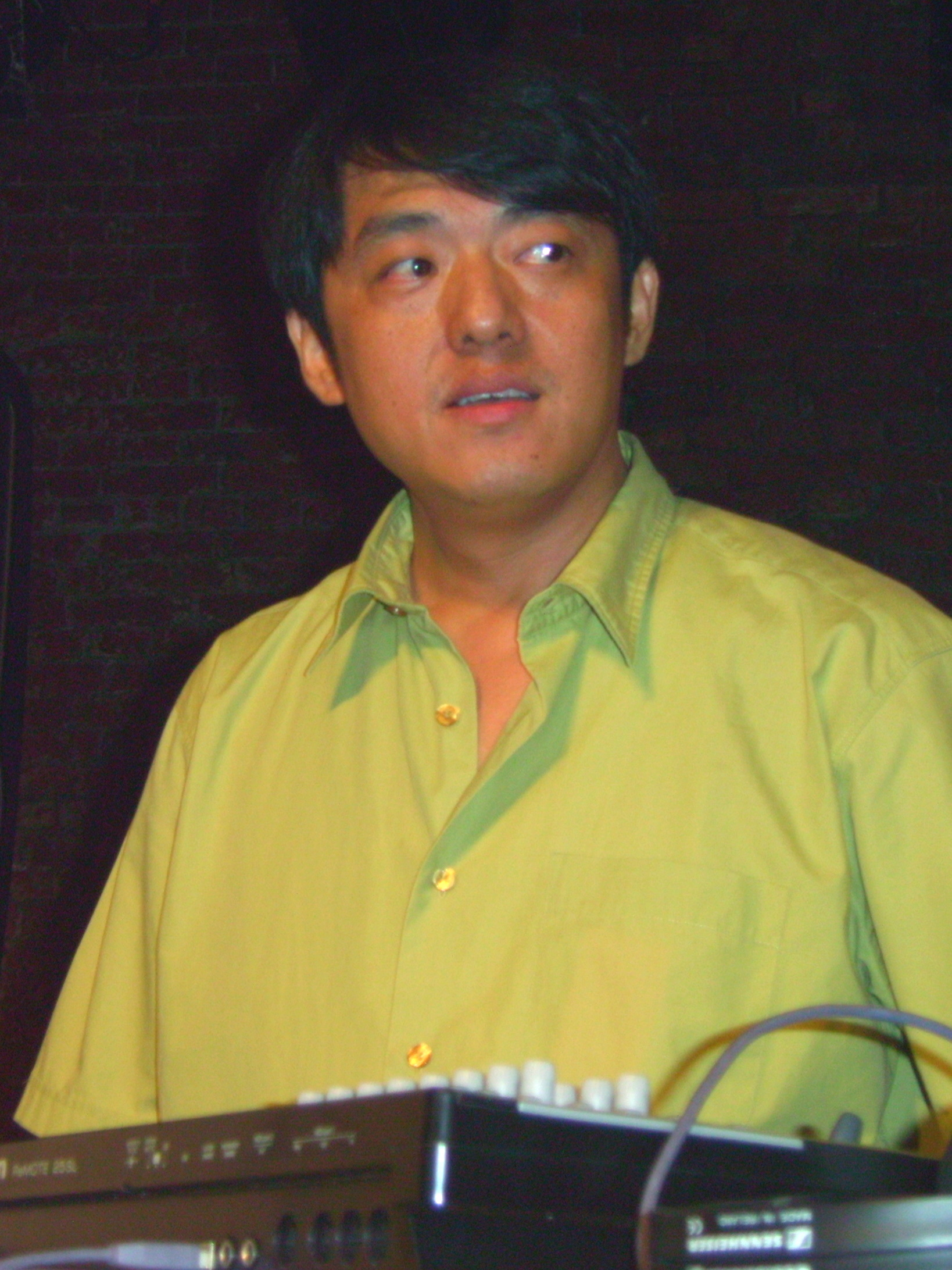
- Born: Lim Chee Hong (林志峰); 7 June 1964 (age 61); Changhua, Taiwan
- Occupations: Musician, DJ, music producer
- Years active: 1990–present
- Musical career
- Also known as: Lin Chiang

Lim Giong (Chinese: 林強; pinyin: Lín Qiáng; Pe̍h-ōe-jī: Lîm Kiông; born 7 June 1964) is a Taiwanese musician, DJ, actor, and an active figure in the Taiwanese experimental electronic music scene. He is known for recording rock songs in Taiwanese Hokkien, starting with his first hit song "Marching Forward" in 1990. He is also known as writing film scores for directors such as Hou Hsiao-hsien, Jia Zhangke, and Bi Gan. He has received numerous awards for his work, including the Cannes Soundtrack Award in 2015 for The Assassin.

== Early life ==
Lim was born in Changhua, later moving to Taichung where his parent ran a small food stall. He was educated in public schools and can speak Mandarin fluently, but he chose to sing in the local dialect Taiwanese Hokkien. After he finished his service in the army in 1988, he went to Taipei with the intention of pursuing a music career, and spent the next two years working in restaurants and beer halls.

== Career ==
Lim Giong's music career began in 1990 when he was signed by a record company, and his first album, Marching Forward (向前走) was released in December 1990. The album proved highly successful, selling over 400,000 copies. In his early albums Lim sang exclusively in Taiwanese Hokkien, and his music showed influences from American and British disco-pop, rock, metal, rap as well as Bob Dylan. His songs ranged from love songs to observations of day-to-day reality of life in contemporary Taiwan including schools, military service and traffic. The title song from his first album, which describes his excitement upon his arrival in Taipei, became highly popular, including being used as campaign songs by political parties. It was chosen as the Song of the Year at the 3rd Golden Melody Awards.

His second album, Brother of Spring, was released in early 1992. It chronicles his struggles before he became famous. This year he also started his acting career and association with the films of Hou Hsiao-hsien, first appearing in a cameo in Dust of Angels. He was associated with the genre known as New Taiwanese Song and gave rousing performances of folk-pop songs, such as "A Soundless Place" from the soundtrack of Dust of Angels.

From his third album onwards (Entertainment World, recorded in England in 1993), his compositions, inspired by Taiwanese traditional music, became increasingly infused with electronic music and evolved from drum and bass, break beat, ambient and electronica towards more experimental and freestyle work. This trend continued with his next two albums: China Fun (2002) and Folk Paradise (2003).

Having studied acting and after appearing in films as an actor, he became the favorite composer of Hou Hsiao-hsien, for whom he wrote the music of Goodbye South, Goodbye and Millennium Mambo. From these experiences, he developed an original perspective in the interaction between sound and image in a form called "Stereo Picture" (立體音畫, sometimes translated as "Three Dimensional Sound Picture"). His album Insects Awaken was released in 2005 in Europe on a French label (MK2.) and, a few months later, in Taiwan on the Taiwanese label EWise Digital Multimedia Corp. He was invited to perform music from this album for an outdoor event at the 2005 Cannes Film Festival, with images of the National Palace Museum's collection. This album won the award of Best Crossover Album at the 17th Golden Melody Awards in 2006. He also produced the music for a special 90 seconds commercial film commissioned to celebrate the 80th anniversary of the National Palace Museum, in October 2005. This short film won the gold award at the American Association of Museums' 2006 Muse Award. He also participates in the activities of the Creative Commons in Taiwan.

Lim composed the music for The Assassin, which won the Cannes Soundtrack Award in 2015.

In June 2018, Lim was invited to become a member of the Academy of Motion Picture Arts and Sciences.

== Discography ==
- Move Forward Hiòng chiân kiâⁿ 向前走 (1990)
- Brother of Spring Chhun-hong siàu-liân hiaⁿ 春風少年兄 (1992)
- Entertainment World:娛樂世界 (1993)
- Goodbye South, Goodbye (Original Movie Soundtrack) 南國再見,南國 (1996)
- The Best of Lin Chung 向前走林強 (2001)
- China Fun 歡樂電子中國年 (2002) China Fun
- Folk Paradise 電民謠 (2003) Folk Paradise
- Insects Awaken (2005)
- Jia Zhang-Ke Movie Music Collection – Music by Lim Giong 賈樟柯電影音樂作品集 (2007)

== Filmography ==
=== As actor ===
- Dust of Angels: 少年吔，安啦！(1992)
- Treasure Island: 只要為你活一天 (1992)
- The Puppetmaster: 戲夢人生 (1993)
- Good Men, Good Women: 好男好女 (1995)
- Goodbye South, Goodbye: 南國再見,南國 (1996)
- March of Happiness: 天馬茶房 (1998)
- So-Called Friend: 哥兒們 (2000)

=== As composer ===
- Goodbye South, Goodbye: 南國再見,南國 (1996)
- Millennium Mambo: 千禧曼波 (2001)
- Two Summers: 兩個夏天(2002)
- The World :世界 (2004)
- Reflections: 愛麗絲的鏡子 (2005)
- Quiet Summer: 寧静夏日 (2005)
- Three Times: 最好的時光 (2005)
- Do Over: 一年之初 (2006)
- Joyful Life: 樂生 (2007)
- Still Life:三峡好人 (2006)
- Dong: 東 (2006)
- Our Ten Years: 我們的十年 (2007)
- Useless: 無用 (2007)
- 24 City: 二十四城记 (2008)
- City of Trance: 迷樂上海 (2008)
- Tree of us: 我們三個 (2008)
- Yang Yang: 陽陽(2009)
- I Wish I Knew: 海上傳奇(2010)
- R U There (2010)
- Deep in the Clouds: 碧羅雪山 (2010)
- A Touch of Sin:天註定 (2013)
- Forgetting to Know You:忘了去懂你 (2013)
- The Assassin: 刺客聶隱娘 (2015)
- Kaili Blues: 路邊野餐 (2015)
- Fly, Kite Fly: 老鷹想飛 (2015)
- City of Jade: 翡翠之城 (2016)
- The Road to Mandalay: 再見瓦城 (2016)
- Small Talk: 日常對話 (2016)
- The Priestess Walks Alone: 我和我的T媽媽 (2016)
- The Gangsters Daughter: 林北小舞 (2017)
- Missing Johnny: 強尼．凱克 (2017)
- End of Summer: 西小河的夏天 (2017)
- The Foolish Bird: 笨鳥 (2017)
- Return: 回程列車 (2017)
- Chi-Yi: 起義 (2018)
- Last Year When the Train Passed by: 去年火車經過的時候 (2018)
- Ash Is Purest White (2018)
- Nina Wu: 灼人秘密 (2019)
- Salute: 我心我行 (2022)
- The Exiles (TBA)

=== As narrator of documentary films ===
- Emerald Horizon (2006)
- Bird Without Borders (Black-faced Spoonbills):返家八千里(黑面琵鷺) (2009)

== Awards ==
=== Taipei Golden Horse Film Festival (金馬獎) ===
- Best Original Film Song (1996): Goodbye South, Goodbye
- Best Original Film Score (2001): Millennium Mambo
- Best Original Film Score (2006): Do Over
- Best Original Film Score (2013): A Touch of Sin

=== American Association of Museums' Muse awards ===
- The Gold Winner of the Promotional and Marketing 2006: "Old is New" (NPM Image Advertisement)

=== The Golden Melody Awards(金曲獎) ===
- Song of the Year (1991): "Marching Forward" (向前走)
- Best Crossover Album (2006): Insects Awaken(驚蟄)

=== Other awards ===
- 11th Taipei Film Festival (2009) (年 第十一屆 台北電影節 劇情長片最佳音樂《陽陽》林強)
  - Narrative Features, Best Music: LIM Giong, for Yang Yang
- 13Th Shanghai International Film Festival (2010)
  - Award for Best Music: LIM Giong, for Deep in the Clouds (China)
- Ghent International Film Festival (2013)
  - The Georges Delerue Prize for Best Music: LIM Giong, for A Touch of Sin
- Cannes Film Festival (2015)
  - Soundtrack Award: LIM Giong, for The Assassin
