= Flight of the Red Balloon =

2007 film directed by Hou Hsiao-Hsien

- ©BAC Films 2007
- Directed by: Hou Hsiao-hsien
- Written by: Hou Hsiao-hsien; François Margolin
- Produced by: Kristina Larsen; François Margolin
- Starring: Juliette Binoche; Hippolyte Girardot
- Cinematography: Pin Bing Lee
- Edited by: Jean-Christophe Hym; Liao Ching-sung
- Release dates: May 17, 2007 (Cannes Film Festival); January 30, 2008 (France)
- Running time: 115 minutes
- Countries: France; Taiwan
- Language: French

Flight of the Red Balloon (French: Le voyage du ballon rouge) is a 2007 French-Taiwanese film directed by Hou Hsiao-hsien. It is the first part in a new series of films produced by Musée d'Orsay, and tells the story of a French family as seen through the eyes of a Chinese student. The film was shot in August and September 2006 on location in Paris. This is Hou's first non-Asian film. It references the classic 1956 French short The Red Balloon directed by Albert Lamorisse.

The film opened the Un Certain Regard section of the Cannes Film Festival in May 2007.

== Plot ==
Suzanne, a puppeteer, lives with her young son Simon in an apartment in Paris. While Suzanne is busy with producing her new Chinese puppet play based on an ancient Chinese text (求妻煮海人), she hires a Chinese film student, Song, as Simon's new nanny. For her college project — a homage to Albert Lamorisse's famous 1956 film The Red Balloon — Song starts to film Simon. She develops a good relationship with mother and son, and translates for Suzanne's masterclass with a Chinese puppet master.

While Simon's older sister Louise is about to graduate from a high school in Brussels, Suzanne plans for Louise to apply for colleges in Paris. For that, she tries to evict her downstairs tenant Marc, who has repeatedly failed to pay his rent, while arguing on the phone with Pierre, Simon's father, who has gone off to Canada for two years to write a novel and who is rarely in touch. Simon visits the Musée d'Orsay on a school trip, where his class is shown The Ball, a painting by Félix Vallotton in which a child chases a red ball.

== Cast ==
- Juliette Binoche as Suzanne
- Simon Iteanu as Simon
- Hippolyte Girardot as Marc
- Fang Song as Song
- Louise Margolin as Louise
- Anna Sigalevitch as Anna
- Charles-Edouard Renault as Lorenzo
- Li Chuan-Zan (李傳燦, son of Li Tian-Lu) as the puppet master

== Critical reception ==
Rotten Tomatoes reported that 81% of 91 sampled critics and 85% of top critics gave the film positive reviews, with an average rating of 6.9 out of 10.

J. Hoberman, writing in The Village Voice was particularly appreciative of the film stating, "Flight of the Red Balloon is contemplative but never static, and punctuated by passages of pure cinema". Kate Stables of Sight & Sound also highly praised the film, "Finding a serene and contemplative beauty in the quotidian world has long been Taiwanese master-minimalist Hou Hsiao Hsien's stock in trade... Hou brings the same depth and deliberation to the film's Parisian exterior... ultimately, it is cinema that is the film's sacred repository of memory and creativity." Jonathan Rosenbaum of Chicago Reader likes the film as ''A relatively slight but sturdy work by Taiwanese master Hou Hsiao-hsien, this slice of contemporary urban life more or less does for Paris what his Cafe Lumiere did for Tokyo, albeit with less minimalism and more overt emotion.''

On the other hand, Duane Byrge of Hollywood Reporter was not impressed. "The imagery of the classic movie, where a spirited red balloon wafts unpredictably over Paris, never even attempts to reach a metaphorical height, nor does it even engage us compositionally."

=== Top ten lists ===
The film appeared on several critics' top ten lists of the best films of 2008.

- 1st - J. Hoberman, The Village Voice
- 1st - Reverse Shot
- 2nd - Nick Schager, Slant Magazine
- 3rd - Liam Lacey, The Globe and Mail
- 4th - Manohla Dargis, The New York Times
- 5th - Andrew O'Hehir, Salon.com
- 5th - Michael Phillips, Chicago Tribune
- 9th - Ty Burr, The Boston Globe

=== Awards ===
The film won the FIPRESCI Prize at the 2007 Valladolid International Film Festival.
