= Hou Hsiao-hsien =

Taiwanese director, actor (born 1947)

- 侯孝賢
- Hou at a screening of The Assassin at the Cinémathèque Française, 2016
- Born: 8 April 1947 (age 79); Meixian County, Guangdong, Republic of China
- Occupations: Film director Screenwriter; Producer; Actor
- Spouse: Tsao Pao-feng
- Children: 1
- Awards: Golden Lion : 1989 A City of Sadness; Jury Prize (Cannes Film Festival) : 1993 The Puppetmaster; Leopard of Honour : 2007; Best Director Award (Cannes Film Festival) : 2015 The Assassin; Golden Horse Awards – Best Feature Film; 2015 The Assassin; Best Adapted Screenplay; 1983 Growing Up; 1984 Ah Fei; Best Original Screenplay; 1985 The Time to Live and the Time to Die; Best Director; 1989 A City of Sadness; 1995 Good Men, Good Women; 2015 The Assassin; Best Taiwanese Filmmaker of the Year; 2005 Three Times; 2015 The Assassin; Lifetime Achievement Award; 2020

Chinese name
- Traditional Chinese: 侯孝賢
- Simplified Chinese: 侯孝贤
Transcriptions
Standard Mandarin
- Hanyu Pinyin: Hóu Xiàoxián
- Wade–Giles: Hou^{2} Hsiao^{4}-hsien^{2}
- IPA: [xǒʊ ɕjâʊ.ɕjɛ̌n]
Yue: Cantonese
- Yale Romanization: Hàuh Haau-Yìhn
- Jyutping: Hau4 Haau3 Jin4
Southern Min
- Hokkien POJ: Hâu Hàu-hiân

Hou Hsiao-hsien (Chinese: 侯孝賢; pinyin: Hóu Xiàoxián; born 8 April 1947) is a retired Taiwanese film director, screenwriter, producer and actor. He is a leading figure in world cinema and in Taiwan's New Wave cinema movement. He won the Golden Lion at the Venice Film Festival in 1989 for his film A City of Sadness (1989), and the Best Director award at the Cannes Film Festival in 2015 for The Assassin (2015). Other highly regarded works of his include The Puppetmaster (1993) and Flowers of Shanghai (1998).

Hou was voted "Director of the Decade" for the 1990s in a poll of American and international critics by The Village Voice and Film Comment. In a 1998 New York Film Festival worldwide critics' poll, Hou was named "one of the three directors most crucial to the future of cinema." A City of Sadness ranked 117th in the British Film Institute's 2012 Sight & Sound critics' poll of the greatest films ever made. In 2017, Metacritic ranked Hsiao-hsien 16th on its list of the 25 best film directors of the 21st century.

== Life and career ==
Hou Hsiao-hsien was born in Meixian District, Guangdong in 1947 to a Hakka family. Later that same year, Hou's father took a job as Head Secretary for the Mayor of Taichung City. The rest of the family joined him in Taiwan the following year and in 1949 he was made Supervisor of the Taipei Educational Bureau. Hou was educated at the National Taiwan Academy of the Arts.

Internationally, Hou is known for his austere and aesthetically rigorous dramas dealing with the upheavals of Taiwanese (and occasionally larger Chinese) history of the past century by viewing its impacts on individuals or small groups of characters. A City of Sadness (1989), for example, portrays a family caught in conflicts between the local Taiwanese and the newly arrived Chinese Nationalist government after World War II. It was groundbreaking for broaching the long-taboo February 28 Incident and ensuing White Terror. It became a major critical and commercial success, and garnered the Golden Lion award at the 1989 Venice Film Festival, making it the first Taiwanese film to win the top prize at the prestigious international film festival.

His storytelling is elliptical and his style marked by extreme long takes with minimal camera movement but intricate choreography of actors and space within the frame. He uses extensive improvisation to arrive at the final shape of his scenes and the low-key, naturalistic acting of his performers. His compositions are decentered, and links between shots do not adhere to an obvious temporal or causal narrative logic. Without abandoning his famous austerity, his imagery has developed a sensual beauty during the 1990s, partly under the influence of his collaboration with cinematographer Mark Lee Ping-bing. Hou's consistent screenwriting collaborator since the mid-1980s has been the renowned author Chu T’ien-wen, a collaboration that began with the screenplay for Chen Kunhou's 1983 film, Growing Up. He has also cast revered puppeteer Li Tian-lu as an actor in several of his movies, most notably The Puppetmaster (1993), which is based on Li's life.

Hou's films have been awarded top prizes from prestigious international festivals such as the Venice Film Festival, Cannes Film Festival, Berlin Film Festival, Hawaii International Film Festival and the Nantes Three Continents Festival. Six of his films to date have been nominated for the Palme d'Or (best film award) at the Cannes Film Festival. Hou was voted "Director of the Decade" for the 1990s in a poll of American and international critics put together by The Village Voice and Film Comment.

He contributed two songs to the soundtrack of Dust of Angels, a film he produced.

He directed the Japanese film Café Lumière (2003) for the Shochiku studio as an homage to Yasujirō Ozu; the film premiered at a festival commemorating the centenary of Ozu's birth. The film deals with themes reminiscent of Ozu—tensions between parents and children and between tradition and modernity—in Hou's typically indirect manner. His 2005 film Three Times features three stories of love set in 1911, 1966 and 2005 using the same actors, Shu Qi and Chang Chen.

In August 2006, Hou embarked on his first Western project. Filmed and financed entirely in France, Flight of the Red Balloon (2007) is the story of a French family as seen through the eyes of a Chinese student. The film is the first part in a series of films sponsored by the Musée d'Orsay and stars Juliette Binoche. In 2010, Hou directed the 3D short film for the Taipei Pavilion at the Expo 2010 Shanghai China.

Hou has also had some acting experience, appearing as the lead in fellow Taiwanese New Wave auteur Edward Yang's 1984 film Taipei Story. He starred as Lung, a former minor league baseball star who is stuck operating an old-style fabric business, longing for his past days of glory. Lung becomes alienated from his girlfriend and tries to find his way in Taipei. Hou also had a small role in the 2013 Chinese comedy-drama film Young Style, about a group of teenagers in high school.

In 2015, Hou won the Best Director award at the Cannes Film Festival for The Assassin (2015).

== Films directed ==
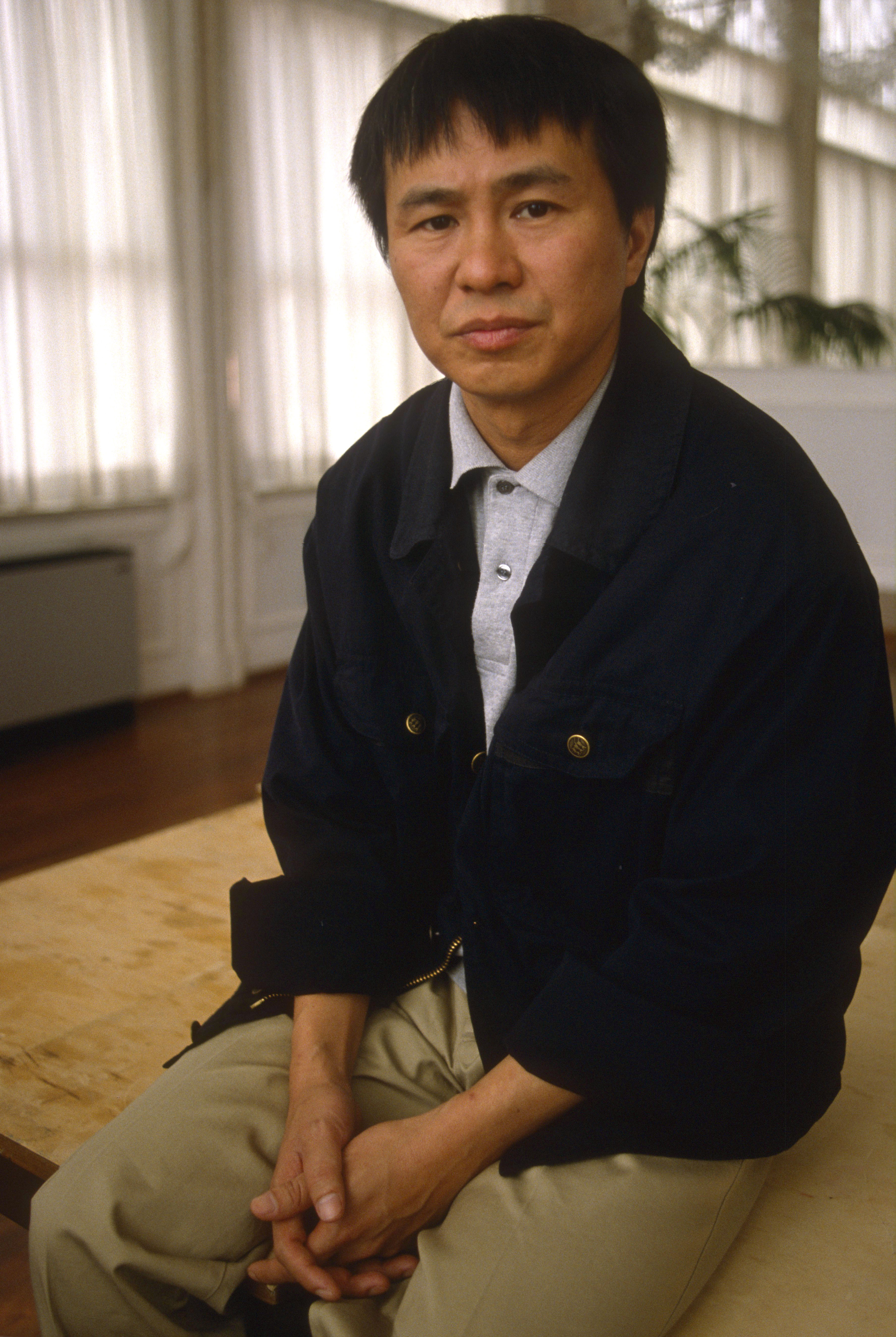
Hou in 1989

Prior to his retirement, Hou directed a total of 18 feature films, and three short film segments of omnibus films, which leads to a total of 21 films. Out of the 21 films he has directed, he has written or co-written 11 of those films in addition to writing or co-writing 10 other films directed by other filmmakers, including Taipei Story (1985) (Dir. Edward Yang), Heartbreak Island (1995) (Dir. Hsiao-ming Hsu) and My Favorite Season (1985) (Dir. Kun Hao Chen).

=== Feature films ===
Hou has directed a total of 18 feature films, of which he has written 11.

==== Cute Girl (1980) ====
Hou's first film as a director, as well as writer, was Cute Girl (1980) or Lovable You, a relatively formulaic romantic comedy (prevalent in Taiwan at the time) starring Kenny Bee, Anthony Chan and Feng Fei-fei. The film was primarily devised as a vehicle for Bee and Feng, who were popular pop-stars in Hong Kong and Taiwan, respectively, at the time. Hou would later collaborate with both Bee and Feng later on in his next feature film, Cheerful Wind (1981). Although the film was shot in a more commercial style unlike his later work, film critic and writer David Bordwell stated that Cute Girl and the rest of Hou's early films "show [Hou] developing, in almost casual ways, techniques of staging and shooting that will become his artistic hallmarks."

==== Cheerful Wind (1981) ====
The second feature film that Hou both wrote and directed was Cheerful Wind (1981) (Feng er ti ta cai), which teamed him up again with the trio of leads from Cute Girl, Kenny Bee, Feng Fei-fei and Anthony Chan.

==== The Green, Green Grass of Home (1982) ====
Hou's third feature film which he both directed and wrote was The Green, Green Grass of Home (1982) (Zai na he pan qing cao qing), which also starred Kenny Bee from his previous two films but also a set of new actors that Hou previously did not work with before, including child actor (at the time) Chou Pin-chun, who won a Best Child Star award from the 1982 Golden Horse Film Festival and Awards for his performance in the film. The film was also nominated for Best Film, Best Director and another Best Child Star award (for actor Cheng Chuan-wen) at the 1982 Golden Horse Film Festival as well.

==== The Boys from Fengkuei (1983) ====
As his fourth feature film, The Boys from Fengkuei (1983) featured the beginnings of what Hou would later consider tenets of his cinematic style, which include more of a naturalistic style and focusing more on youth and provincial/rural life. The film starred now-director Doze Niu as Ah-Ching, as a member of a gang of young boys who have finished school in their island fishing village of Fengkuei and spend most of their days fighting and drinking. They decide to go to the port city of Kaohsiung to look for work, where Ah-Ching falls in love with a girlfriend of a neighbor. The film is also about how the teenagers face the realities of urban life as they come of age. The film won the Golden Montgolfiere award (tied with 1984's Wanderers of the Desert) at the 1984 Nantes Three Continents Festival. It was also nominated for Best Feature Film, Best Director, Best Cinematography (Kun Hao Chen), and Best Film Editing (Ching-Song Liao) awards at the 1984 Golden Horse Film Festival.

==== The "Coming of Age" Trilogy (1984-1986) ====
Hou's "Coming of Age" trilogy includes the three films: A Summer at Grandpa's (1984), A Time to Live, A Time to Die (1985), and Dust in the Wind (1986).

==== A Summer at Grandpa's (1984) ====
Hou's fifth feature film was A Summer at Grandpa's (1984), which won a Best Director award for Hou at the 1984 Asia-Pacific Film Festival and the Golden Montgolfiere award (tied with The Runner (1984)) at the 1985 Nantes Three Continents Festival, and the Prize of the Ecumenical Jury - Special Mention at the 1985 Locarno International Film Festival. The film was also nominated for a Best Child Star (Chi-Kuang Wang) and Best Adapted Screenplay (Chu T’ien-wen) at the 1984 Golden Horse Film Festival. The film also starred fellow New Taiwanese filmmaker Edward Yang in a brief role, with Yang returning the favor by casting Hou in his film Taipei Story (1985).

==== A Time to Live, A Time to Die (1985) ====
As his sixth feature film, A Time to Live, A Time to Die (1985) (also known as The Time to Live and the Time to Die, Chinese: 童年往事; pinyin: Tóngnián wǎngshì; lit. 'Incidents from a Childhood Past') was perhaps Hou's first internationally successful film, winning a grand total of 8 awards from film festivals all over the world: a Special Jury Award at the 1985 Asia-Pacific Film Festival, a FIPRESCI Prize at the Forum of New Cinema at the 1986 Berlin International Film Festival (or Berlinale), a Best Original Screenplay (Hou Hsiao-hsien and Chu T’ien-wen), a Best Supporting Actress (Ru-Yun Tang) at the 1985 Golden Horse Film Festival (where it was also nominated for Best Feature Film, Best Director, Best Original Film Score (Chu-chu Wu) and Best Sound Recording (Chiang-Sheng Hsin) awards), a Special Jury Award at the 1986 Hawaii International Film Festival, a Rotterdam Award for Best Non-American/Non-European Film at the 1987 Rotterdam International Film Festival, a Kinema Junpo Award at the 1990 Kinema Junpo Awards (also for Dust in the Wind), and a Special Jury Prize at the 1986 Torino International Festival of Young Cinema.

==== Dust in the Wind (1986) ====
Hou's seventh feature film was Dust in the Wind (1986), which won a Kinema Junpo Award for Best Foreign Language Film Director at the 1990 Kinema Junpo Awards (shared also with his previous film, A Time to Live, A Time to Die), and Best Cinematography Mark Lee Ping Bin and Best Score (Hou Hsiao-hsien) at the 1987 Nantes Three Continents Festival (where it was also nominated for the Golden Montgolfiere).

==== Daughter of the Nile (1987) ====
Hou's eighth feature film concerns the story of a girl (played by Taiwanese pop star Lin Yang) who works at a Kentucky Fried Chicken location in Taipei to support her family, which includes a brother character (played by Jack Kao) who is involved in crime and gangs. The title is also a reference to a character in the Japanese manga Crest of the Royal Family who is referred to as the "Daughter of the Nile." The film won a Best Original Film Score award (Hung-yi Chang) at the 1987 Golden Horse Film Festival and also a Special Jury Prize in the International Feature Film Competition at the 1987 Torino International Festival of Young Cinema.

==== The Taiwan Trilogy (1989-1995) ====
Hou's "Taiwan Trilogy" includes the three films: A City of Sadness (1989), The Puppetmaster (1993), and Good Men, Good Women (1995).

==== A City of Sadness (1989) ====
Hou's ninth feature film was almost universally acclaimed by film critics as a masterpiece upon its release. It has the distinction of being the first ever Taiwanese film to win the prestigious Golden Lion award at the 1989 Venice Film Festival, where Hou also won a Special Golden Ciak award ("For artistic originality and sensitivity") and a UNESCO Award. It is also the very first film to openly deal with the authoritarian rule of the Kuomintang (KMT) after taking Taiwan over from the Japanese in 1945 following WWII, and the tragic February 28 Incident (1947), where thousands of Taiwanese citizens were killed. In the British Film Institute's 2012 Sight & Sound poll, 2 directors and 14 film critics named it one of "the greatest films ever made", ranking #322 in the directors' poll and #117 in the critics' poll. The film was also Taiwan's Best Foreign Language Film entry for the 62nd Academy Awards, but it did not make the final nomination shortlist.

Starring Tony Leung Chiu-Wai as the deaf-mute but all-seeing Wen-ching and his older brother Wen-leung (Jack Kao), the film dealt with political subject matter involving the February 28 Incident and the "White Terror" era where countless Taiwanese citizens were incarcerated and shot by the KMT government in the late 1940s after their displacement from China to Taiwan after the Civil War of 1949.

The film also won Best Director and Best Leading Actor (Sung Young Chen) awards at the 1989 Golden Horse Film Festival, where it was also nominated for Best Feature Film, Best Original Screenplay (Chu T’ien-wen and Hou Hsiao-hsien), Best Film Editing (Ching-Song Liao), Best Cinematography (Huai-en Chen) and Best Sound Recording (Duu-Chih Tu and Ching-an Yang) awards. The film won a Kinema Junpo Award for Best Foreign Language Film at the 1991 Kinema Junpo Awards, a Best Foreign Language Film award at the 1991 Mainichi Film Concours, and a Special Award from the USA Political Film Society in 1990. It was also nominated for a Best Foreign Film award at the 1991 Independent Spirit Awards.

==== The Puppetmaster (1993) ====
Hou's tenth film was The Puppetmaster (1993), a sprawling half-documentary, half-narrative film hybrid that told the story of Li Tian-lu, the most celebrated puppeteer in Taiwan. The film won the Jury Prize at the 1993 Cannes Film Festival, where it was nominated for the Palme d'Or. The film was also another masterpiece listed in the 2012 British Film Institute Sight & Sound poll, with three directors and seven film critics declaring it as "one of the greatest films ever made."

The Puppetmaster also won FIPRESCI Prize at the 1994 Istanbul International Film Festival, the Georges Delerue Prize at the 1993 Ghent International Film Festival, the Distribution Help Award at the 1994 Fribourg International Film Festival (tying with Kosh ba kosh (1993)), and Best Cinematography (Ping Bin Lee), Best Makeup & Costume Design (Pei-yun Juan and Kuang-Hui Chang), and Best Sound Effects (Duu-Chih Tu) at the 1993 Golden Horse Film Festival, where it was also nominated for Best Feature Film, Best Art Direction (Hung Chang, Hsien-Ko Ho, Ming-Ching Lu, and Chao-yi Tsai) and Best Original Film Score (Ming-chang Chen).

==== Good Men, Good Women (1995) ====
Hou's eleventh film was a post-modern time-jumping and fourth-wall breaking narrative that jumped between the modern-day life of an actress named Liang Ching (played by Annie Shizukah Inoh) and the historical role of Chiang Bi-Yu, who she was portraying in a 1940s period piece film. Jack Kao also appeared as her boyfriend, Ah-Wei. The film was nominated and in competition for the prestigious Palme d'Or at the 1995 Cannes Film Festival, and won Best Director, Best Adapted Screenplay (Chu T’ien-wen) and Best Sound Recording (Duu-Chih Tu) at the 1995 Golden Horse Film Festival and Awards, where it was also nominated for Best Feature Film, Best Leading Actress (Inoh) and Best Film Editing (Ching-Song Liao) awards.

The film also won Best Director and Best Art Direction (Hsien-Ko Ho, Wen-Ying Huang and Ming-Ching Lu) awards at the 1996 Asia-Pacific Film Festival, Golden Deer awards for Best Director and Best Film at the 1996 Changchun Film Festival, a Special Jury Award from the 1996 Fribourg International Film Festival, the Golden Maile award for Best Narrative Feature at the 1995 Hawaii International Film Festival, and a FIPRESCI/NETPAC Award (tied with Hkhagoroloi Bohu Door (1995)) and a Special Achievement Award at the 1996 Singapore International Film Festival. The film was also nominated for the Gold Hugo award for Best Feature at the 1995 Chicago International Film Festival.

==== Goodbye South, Goodbye (1996) ====
Goodbye South, Goodbye, Hou's twelfth film, was set in rural Taiwan and concerned the lives of Taipei petty criminals played by Giong Lim, Shih-huang Chen, Vicky Wei, Jack Kao, Annie Shizukah Inoh (the latter two actors who Hou reunited with from Good Men, Good Women (1995)). The film was nominated for the Palme d'Or at the 1996 Cannes Film Festival and also won a Best Original Film Song award (for composer/lyricist/performer Giong Lim and his song "Self-Destruction") at the 1996 Golden Horse Film Festival and Awards.

==== Flowers of Shanghai (1998) ====
Hou's thirteenth film, Flowers of Shanghai (1998), would see him reunite with actor Tony Leung Chiu-Wai from A City of Sadness as well as Jack Kao, and was a period piece set in the elegant brothels (also known as "flower houses") of 1880s Shanghai. The screenplay was written and translated by acclaimed novelist Eileen Chang, along with frequent Hou screenwriter collaborator Chu T’ien-wen, based on a novel by Bangqin Han. The film also starred Carina Lau, Michiko Hada, Vicky Wei, Annie Shizukah Inoh, Rebecca Pan and Ming Hsu.

The film was nominated for the Palme d'Or at the 1998 Cannes Film Festival and also won Best Director and Best Art Director (Wen-Ying Huang) at the 1998 Asia-Pacific Film Festival, the Golden Crow Pheasant award at the 1999 International Film Festival of Kerala, as well as a Jury Award and a Best Art Direction award (Wen-Ying Huang and Chih-Wei Tsao) at the 1998 Golden Horse Film Festival, where it was also nominated for Best Feature, Best Director and Best Makeup & Costume Design (Wen-Ying Huang, Shu-Chen Liao and Bu-Hai Shen).

==== Millennium Mambo (2001) ====
Millennium Mambo (2001) was Hou's fourteenth film and the film that marked his first collaboration with actress Shu Qi, who would later go on to appear in three other of Hou's later films and become his muse. The film follows Shu as a character named Vicky, who looks back ten years to 2000 when she was in a relationship with Hao-Hao (Duan Chun-hao) where she is now in a relationship with Jack (Jack Kao). The film's free-wheeling style, cinematography and sound design was praised by critics, and also garnered the Technical Grand Prize for the film's sound designer/mixer/director Duu-Chih Tu at the 2001 Cannes Film Festival, where it was also nominated for a Palme d'Or award. The film also won Best Cinematography (Ping Bin Lee), Best Sound Effects (Duu-Chih Tu) and Best Original Film Score (Kai-yu Huang and Giong Lim) at the 2001 Golden Horse Film Festival, where it was nominated for Best Leading Actress (Shu Qi) and Best Original Film Song (composer/lyricist/performer Giong Lim, for the song "Fly to the Sky").

For the film, Hou also won the Silver Hugo award at the 2001 Chicago International Film Festival, and a Best Director award as well as a Grand Prix award at the 2001 Ghent International Film Festival. The film was also nominated for a Best Actress (Hong Kong/Taiwan) award at the 2002 Chinese Media Film Awards, a Screen International Award at the 2001 European Film Awards, and the Golden Maile award at the 2001 Hawaii International Film Festival.

==== Café Lumière (2003) ====
Hou's fifteenth feature film - Café Lumière (2003) (alternate title: "Kôhî jikô") - was a self-acknowledged homage to the cinema of legendary Japanese filmmaker Yasujirō Ozu, who Hou considers a major influence on his own work. Set in Tokyo for the most part, the film starred Japanese pop singer Yo Hitoto as Yōko in her acting debut (who won the "Newcomer of the Year" award at the 2005 Awards of the Japanese Academy for her performance) as well as renowned Japanese actor Tadanobu Asano as Hajime Takeuchi. The film won the Golden Tulip award at the 2005 Istanbul International Film Festival, and was also nominated for the Golden Lion award at the 2004 Venice Film Festival and a "Best Film Not in the English Language" award at the 2004 International Cinephile Society (ICS) Awards.

==== Three Times (2005) ====
Three Times would mark Hou's second collaboration with actress Shu Qi and first collaboration with actor Chang Chen. It is also his sixteenth film, and weaves together three separate stories that describe the relationship of a couple played by Shu and Chang during three separate time periods: (1) "A Time for Love" set in 1966 Kaohsiung; (2) "A Time for Freedom" set in 1911 Dadaocheng; and (3) "A Time for Youth" set in 2005 Taipei.

The film was also nominated for the Palme d'Or at the 2005 Cannes Film Festival and at the 2005 Golden Horse Film Festival, the film won Best Actress (Shu Qi), Best Taiwanese Film of the Year and Best Taiwanese Filmmaker of the Year awards, while being nominated for Best Feature Film, Best Director, Best Leading Actor (Chang Chen), Best Original Screenplay (Chu T’ien-wen and Hou Hsiao-hsien), Best Cinematography (Ping Bin Lee), Best Art Direction (Wen-Ying Huang), Best Makeup & Costume Design (Wen-Ying Huang, Shu-Chen Liao and Gin Oy), and Best Film Editing (Ching-Song Liao and Ju-kuan Hsiao) awards. The film also won the Grand Prix / Golden Apricot award for Best Film at the 2006 Yerevan International Film Festival, a Jury Prize from the 2005 Tallinn Black Nights Film Festival, where it was also nominated for the Grand Prize. Finally, the film was also nominated for a Best Asian Film award from the 2006 Hong Kong Film Awards and a Best Foreign Language Film award from the 2006 St. Louis Film Critics Association Awards. In an Indiewire Critics' Poll taken in 2006 for Best Film of the Year, the film was ranked in 6th place.

==== Flight of the Red Balloon (2007) ====
Hou's seventeenth film and first "foreign language" film (which featured dialogue in both French and Mandarin) was Flight of the Red Balloon (2007) (French: "Le voyage du ballon rouge"), which starred acclaimed French actress Juliette Binoche, Hippolyte Girardot, Fang Song and others. The film was nominated for the Un Certain Regard award at the 2007 Cannes Film Festival and also won the FIPRESCI Prize at the 2007 Valladolid International Film Festival as well. The film's cinematographer, Mark Lee Ping-Bin aka Ping Bin Lee, also won 2nd place for a Best Cinematography award from the National Society of Film Critics.

Furthermore, the film won Best Film and Best Director awards in an Indiewire Critics' Poll taken in 2008, which ranked Binoche's performance in the film the 5th best one of that year and in a Village Voice Film Poll taken the same year, the film won 2nd place for Best Film and 3rd place for Best Actress (Binoche). In addition, Flight of the Red Balloon won 3rd place in the 2009 International Cinephile Society (ICS) Awards for the "Best Film Not in the English Language" award, and the ICS also nominated the film for Best Picture, Best Director, Best Actress (Binoche), Best Adapted Screenplay (Hou Hsiao-hsien and Francois Margolin) and Best Cinematography (Ping Bin Lee) awards. The film was also nominated for a Best Foreign Language Film (France)by the Online Film & Television Association in 2009.

==== The Assassin (2015) ====
The Assassin (2015) was Hou's eighteenth feature film and garnered him the Best Director award at the 2015 Cannes Film Festival, where composer Giong Lim also won the Cannes Soundtrack Award. The film also swept the 2015 Golden Horse Film Festival and Awards, winning a grand total of five awards: Best Director, Best Feature Film, Best Cinematography (Ping Bin Lee), Best Makeup & Costume Design (Wen-Ying Huang), and Best Sound Effects (Duu-Chih Tu, Shih Yi Chu, Shu-yao Wu). The film was also nominated for 5 additional Golden Horse awards: Best Leading Actress (Shi Qu), Best Adapted Screenplay (Cheng Ah, Chu T’ien-wen and Hai-Meng Hsieh), Best Art Direction (Wen-Ying Huang), Best Original Film Score (Giong Lim) and Best Film Editing (Ching-Song Liao). The film was also nominated for a BAFTA Award for "Best Foreign Language Film", but lost to Wild Tales.

The Assassin also won a Best Foreign Language Film award from the 2015 Florida Film Critics Circle Awards, a "Best Film Not in the English Language" award from the Online Film Critics Society (where it was also nominated for a Best Cinematography award for DP Ping Bin Lee), and a Best Foreign Language film award from the Vancouver Film Critics Circle in 2016. The film also won 2nd place for a Best Foreign Language Film award from the Dallas-Fort Worth Film Critics Association in 2015, 3rd place in a 2015 indieWire Critics' Poll for Best Director and Best Cinematography (Ping Bin Lee), where it also received an 8th place for Best Film and a 9th place for Best Editing (Chih-Chia Huang), and 2nd place for a Best Foreign Language Film Award from the Southeastern Film Critics Association Awards in 2015.

In addition, the film was nominated for a Best Foreign Language Film award from the 2016 Broadcast Film Critics Association Awards, a Best Foreign Language Film award from the Central Ohio Film Critics Association in 2016, a Best Foreign Language Film award from the Houston Film Critics Society in 2016, a Best Foreign Language Film award from the North Carolina Film Critics Association in 2016, and Best Motion Picture (International Film) award and won the Best Costume Design award from the Satellite Awards in 2015.

The Assassin was also nominated for a Best Art Direction/Production Design award and a Best Foreign Language Film award from the Chicago Film Critics Association in 2015, an Art Cinema award from the 2015 Hamburg Film Festival, a Best Foreign Film award from the Kansas City Film Critics Circle in 2015, a Best International Film award from the Phoenix Critics Circle in 2015, a Best Cinematography (Ping Bin Lee) and Best Foreign Language Film from the San Francisco Film Critics Circle in 2015, a Best Foreign Language Film award from the St. Louis Film Critics Association in 2015, a Best Foreign Language Film award from the Toronto Film Critics Association in 2016, and a Best Foreign Language Film award from the Washington DC Area Film Critics Association in 2015.

The film was also Taiwan's official entry as Best Foreign Language Film at the 88th Academy Awards (2016) but did not make the final shortlist.

=== Short film segments in omnibus films ===
Hou has directed a total of three short film segments in omnibus or anthology films.

==== The Sandwich Man (1983) ====
In 1983, Hou directed a short film segment in the omnibus film The Sandwich Man (1983) (the title segment, also entitled The Sandwich Man) which also featured segments directed by Wan Jen and Zhuang Xiang Zeng entitled The Taste of Apples and Vicki's Hat. The screenplay for all three segments was written by Wu Nien-jen, and The Sandwich Man segment is based on a short story by writer/novelist Huang Chunming entitled "His Son's Big Doll" (or Puppet), whereas The Taste of Apples segment is based on a short story of the same name and Vicki's Hat is based on Xiaoqi's Cap, all also by Huang. The film was an omnibus film that followed a similar omnibus film done a year earlier, In Our Time (1982), which featured short films directed and written by other Taiwanese filmmakers Edward Yang, Yi Chang, Ko I-chen, and Chao Te-chen. The film was also nominated for three awards at the 1983 Golden Horse Film Festival: Best Supporting Actor (Chen Bor-jeng who appeared in Hou's segment The Sandwich Man), Best Child Star (Ching-Kuo Yan - who appeared in the Taste of Apples segment), and Best Adapted Screenplay (Wu Nien-jen).

==== To Each His Own Cinema (2007) ====
Hou directed the short film segment "The Electric Princess House" in the omnibus film To Each His Own Cinema (2007).

==== 3D Short Film for Taipei Pavilion ====
In 2010, Hou directed a 3D short film for the Taipei Pavilion in the Expo 2010 Shanghai China.

==== 10+10 (2011) ====
Hou also directed, and appeared as a presenter in, the short film segment "La Belle Epoque" of the seminal Taiwanese cinema omnibus/anthology film 10+10 (2011). The segment starred Shu Qi and Fang Mei.

== Writing ==
Hou has written 21 films in total, 8 of which he also directed (The Assassin, Flight of the Red Balloon, Three Times, Café Lumière, A Time to Live, a Time to Die, A Summer at Grandpa's, Cute Girl, and The Green, Green Grass of Home). Most notably, Hou was one of the co-writers, along with Chu T’ien-wen and Edward Yang on Yang's film Taipei Story (1985), which Hou also starred in as the main character and protagonist, Lung.

== Producing ==
Hou has produced 14 films - meaning serving as a producer or executive producer on a project - and the only film he both produced and directed is The Assassin (2015). Among the notable films that he has served as an executive producer on include Chi Po-lin's Beyond Beauty: Taiwan from Above (2013) - winner of the Best Documentary award at the 2013 Golden Horse Film Festival and Awards, Wu Nien-jen's A Borrowed Life (Duo Sang) (1994) (winner of the Grand Prize at The Torino Film Festival in Italy, the Best Actor and The International Critics Award at The Thessaloniki Film Festival in Greece and one of Martin Scorsese's top/favorite/best films of the 1990s decade) and Zhang Yimou's Best Foreign Language Film Oscar-Nominated Raise the Red Lantern (1991).

== Acting ==
Hou has acted in four films, including starring as the main character "Lung" in fellow Taiwanese New Wave auteur Edward Yang's Taipei Story (1985), which was perhaps Yang trying to return the favor for Hou casting him in his film A Summer at Grandpa's (1984). Prior to that appearance, Hou appeared in another fellow Taiwanese New Wave filmmaker's film, Ko I-chen's I Love Mary (1984). In 1986, Hou played the character "Boy-Boy" in Kei Shu's Lao Niang Gou Sao (1986) and in 2013, Hou appeared as an older parental figure in Jie Liu's high school comedy, Young Style (2013).

== Other work ==
Hou was an assistant director on seven films, a presenter for the segment "La Belle Epoque" in the Taiwanese omnibus film 10+10 (2011) (which he also directed), and a script supervisor on the film The Heart with Million Knots (1973). Hou also directed a TV commercial for Nippon Shokubai Co. in 1991.

== Personal life ==
Hou's wife is Tsao Pao-feng, who was one of the producers on Hou's film Flight of the Red Balloon (2007). Together they have one daughter named Yun-hua. Hou's father was Hou Fen-ming, who was portrayed in Hou's film A Time to Live, A Time to Die (1985) (played by Tien Feng).

Although he rarely discusses politics in public, Hou was a supporter of the now disbanded Democratic Action Alliance (民主行動聯盟) which advocates for Chinese unification. Hou has stated in interview that "I was born in mainland China, so to me I will always be Chinese, no matter where I am." The Taiwanese political magazine New Bloom stated that although Hou has often been regarded as the "quintessentially Taiwanese filmmaker" in the West, his personal politics oppose how his films are interpreted by Anglophone critics.

In October 2023, it was reported that Hou Hsiao-hsien is battling Alzheimer's disease and is now retired from filmmaking.

== Filmography ==
=== As director ===
Year	English title	Original title	Notes
1980	Cute Girl	就是溜溜的她	First full-length feature film
1981	Cheerful Wind	風兒踢踏踩	
1982	The Green, Green Grass of Home	在那河畔青草青	
1983	The Sandwich Man	兒子的大玩偶	Directed with Wan Jen and Tseng Chuang-hsiang
1983	The Boys from Fengkuei	風櫃來的人	Golden Montgolfiere at the 1984 Three Continents Festival
1984	A Summer at Grandpa's	冬冬的假期	Golden Montgolfiere at the 1985 Three Continents Festival
1985	A Time to Live, A Time to Die	童年往事	FIPRESCI Prize at the 1986 Berlin International Film Festival
1986	Dust in the Wind	戀戀風塵	Entered into the 1985 Three Continents Festival
1987	Daughter of the Nile	尼羅河的女兒	Entered into Directors' Fortnight at the 1988 Cannes Film Festival
1989	A City of Sadness	悲情城市	Golden Lion at the 1989 Venice Film Festival
1993	The Puppetmaster	戲夢人生	Jury Prize at the 1993 Cannes Film Festival
1995	Good Men, Good Women	好男好女	Best Feature Film at the 1995 Hawaii International Film Festival
1996	Goodbye South, Goodbye	南國再見，南國	Entered into the 1996 Cannes Film Festival
1998	Flowers of Shanghai	海上花	Entered into the 1998 Cannes Film Festival
2001	Millennium Mambo	千禧曼波	Technical Grand Prize at the 2001 Cannes Film Festival
2003	Café Lumière	咖啡時光	Japanese production, Entered into the 2004 Venice Film Festival
2005	Three Times	最好的時光	Entered into the 2005 Cannes Film Festival
2007	The Electric Princess House	電姬館	Segment of the anthology film To Each His Own Cinema
2008	Flight of the Red Balloon	Le voyage du ballon rouge 紅氣球的旅行	French production, Entered into Un Certain Regard at the 2007 Cannes Film Festival
2011	La Belle Epoque	黃金之弦	Segment of the anthology film 10+10
2015	The Assassin	聶隱娘	Best Director Award at the 2015 Cannes Film Festival

=== As producer ===
Year	English title	Original title	Director	Notes
1991	Raise the Red Lantern	大紅燈籠高高掛	Zhang Yimou	
1992	Dust of Angels	少年吔，安啦	Hsu Hsiao-ming	
1993	Treasure Island	只要為你活一天	Chen Kuo-fu	
1994	A Borrowed Life	多桑	Wu Nien-jen	
1995	Heartbreak Island	去年冬天	Hsu Hsiao-ming	
2000	Mirror Image	命帶追逐	Hsiao Ya-chuan	
2007	Reflection	愛麗絲的鏡子	Yao Hung-i	
2010	One Day	有一天	Hou Ji-ran	
2010	Taipei Exchanges	第36個故事	Hsiao Ya-chuan	
2010	Return Ticket	到阜陽六百里	Teng Yung-shing	
2011	Hometown Boy	金城小子	Yao Hung-i	
2013	Beyond Beauty: Taiwan from Above	看見台灣	Chi Po-lin	
2016	Small Talk	日常對話	Huang Hui-chen	As executive producer
2017	Missing Johnny	強尼．凱克	Huang Xi	As executive producer
2022	Salute	我心我行	Yao Hung-i	
2024	Mongrel	白衣蒼狗	Chiang Wei-liang; Yin You-qiao	As executive producer
2024	Daughter's Daughter	女兒的女兒	Huang Xi	

=== As actor / himself ===
Year	English title	Original title	Director
1983	The Boys from Fengkuei	風櫃來的人	Himself
1984	I Love Mary	我愛瑪莉	Ko I-chen
1985	Taipei Story	青梅竹馬	Edward Yang
1986	Soul	老娘夠騷	Shu Kei
1996	Yang±Yin: Gender in Chinese Cinema	男生女相	Stanley Kwan
1997	HHH: A Portrait of Hou Hsiao-hsien	HHH - Un portrait de Hou Hsiao-hsien	Olivier Assayas
2010	I Wish I Knew	海上傳奇	Jia Zhangke
2013	Young Style	青春派	Jie Liu
