= The Ginseng King =

1988 Taiwanese fantasy film

- Directed by: Chu-Chin Wang
- Written by: Yu-lin Chu; Chun-Ming Kuo
- Produced by: Sheng-Chung Liu
- Starring: Cynthia Khan; Ying Chieh Chen
- Cinematography: Wei-An Chen
- Edited by: Chu-Li Yan
- Music by: Yu Lung Hsi
- Release date: 1988 (Taiwan)
- Running time: 85 minutes
- Country: Taiwan
- Language: Mandarin

The Ginseng King, also known as Three-Head Monster (Sān tóu mówáng), is a 1988 Taiwanese fantasy film that some have suggested is an unofficial remake of The NeverEnding Story.

== Plot ==
A young boy embarks on a mission to save his mother after she is bitten by a Nazi zombie. He must save the Ginseng King from a three-headed king.

== Cast ==
- Cynthia Khan as The Ginseng Hunter

== Release ==
Daiei Video released the film on VHS in Japan.

== See also ==
- List of zombie Nazi films
- List of Taiwanese films of the 1980s
