= Mark Lee Ping-bing =

Taiwanese cinematographer and photographer

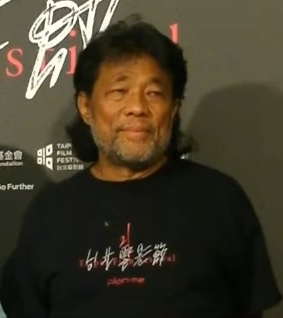
- Mark Lee Ping-bing in July 2019
- Born: 8 August 1954 (age 71); Taiwan
- Other names: Ping Bin Lee
- Occupations: Cinematographer, photographer
- Years active: 1977–present
- Spouse: Robin Crist Lee (m. 1987)
- Children: 2

Chinese name
- Traditional Chinese: 李屏賓
- Simplified Chinese: 李屏宾
- Hanyu Pinyin: Lǐ Píngbīn

Mark Lee Ping-bing (Chinese: 李屏賓; pinyin: Lǐ Píngbīn; born 8 August 1954) is a Taiwanese cinematographer, photographer and author with over 70 films and 21 international awards to his credit including 2 Glory Of The Country Awards from the Government Information Office of Taiwan and the president of Taiwan's Light Of The Cinema Award. Lee began his film career in 1977 and in 1985 he started his prolific collaboration with Taiwanese filmmaker Hou Hsiao-hsien. Known best for his use of natural lighting utilizing real film and graceful camera movement, Lee received the Grand Technical Prize at the Cannes Film Festival in 2000 for In the Mood for Love. A member of the Academy of Motion Picture Arts and Sciences, Lee was honored with nominations by the American Society of Cinematographers for its 2014 First Annual Spotlight Award for Best Cinematography for his work on the 2012 film Renoir and by the French Academy of Cinema Arts for a César Award for Best Cinematography in 2014 also for the film Renoir.

In 2009, Taiwanese director Chiang Hsiu-chiung and Kwan Pun Leung made a documentary about Lee entitled Let The Wind Carry Me.

Also in 2009, a book of Lee's photography entitled A Poet of Light and Shadow was published.

In November 2021, he succeeded director Ang Lee as head of the Taipei Golden Horse Film Festival Executive Committee. The Chair leads the Committee for a two-year term and may be re-elected once.

== Filmography ==
• 2025: You Are the Best
- 2021: Looking for a Lady With Fangs and a Moustache
- 2020: Mo Er Dao Ga
- 2019: Somewhere Winter
- 2019: Ye yi ji ye
- 2018: Us and Them
- 2017: Seventy-Seven Days
- 2017: Love Education
- 2017: Endangered Species
- 2016: Eternity
- 2016: Crosscurrent
- 2015: The Last Women Standing
- 2015: The Assassin
- 2015: The Queens
- 2015: Somewhere Only We Know
- 2015: Lost and Love
- 2014: (Sex) Appeal
- 2013: The Rooftop
- 2012: Renoir
- 2012: Love
- 2012: Black & White Episode 1: The Dawn of Assault
- 2011: Mural
- 2010: Once Upon a Time in Tibet
- 2010: Norwegian Wood
- 2010: Love in Disguise
- 2009: Rail Truck
- 2009: Murderer
- 2009: Air Doll
- 2009: Detours to Paradise (Sincerely Yours)
- 2008: Claustrophobia
- 2008: Afterwards
- 2007: Secret
- 2007: Flight of the Red Balloon
- 2007: The Sun Also Rises
- 2007: The Matrimony
- 2006: After This Our Exile
- 2006: Tripping
- 2006: Reflections
- 2005: Dragon Eye Congee: A Dream of Love
- 2005: Spring Snow
- 2005: Three Times
- 2004: Letter from an Unknown Woman
- 2003: Café Lumière
- 2003: Inquiétudes
- 2002: Springtime in a Small Town
- 2002: Youling renjian II: Gui wei ren jian
- 2002: Princess D
- 2002: Time 4 Hope
- 2001: Millennium Mambo
- 2001: Forever and Ever
- 2000: In the Mood for Love
- 2000: Days of Tomorrow
- 2000: The Vertical Ray of the Sun
- 2000: Tempting Heart
- 1998: Flowers of Shanghai
- 1998: Chivalrous Legend
- 1997: Task Force
- 1997: Eighteen Springs
- 1996: Fei tian
- 1996: Buddha Bless America
- 1996: Goodbye South, Goodbye
- 1995: Modern Republic
- 1995: Whatever Will Be, Will Be
- 1995: Summer Snow
- 1994: Wing Chun
- 1994: Heaven and Earth
- 1993: The Legend II
- 1993: The Puppetmaster
- 1992: China Heat
- 1991: My American Grandson
- 1990: Whampoa Blues
- 1990: Tiger Cage 2
- 1989: The Dull Ice Flower
- 1989: City Kids 1989
- 1988: Runaway Blues
- 1988: Jiang hu jie ban ren
- 1987: Strawman
- 1987: Hei pi yu bai ya
- 1987: Dust in the Wind
- 1985: Papa's Spring
- 1985: The Time to Live and the Time to Die
- 1985: Run Away
- 1984: Amazing Stories
- 1982: Portrait of a Fanatic

== Awards and nominations ==
=== Awards ===
- 2016: Berlin International Film Festival, Crosscurrent — Silver Bear for Outstanding Artistic Contribution
- 2011: Asian Film Awards, Norwegian Wood — Best Cinematographer
- 2008: National Award For Arts (Taiwan), Lifetime Achievement
- 2008 Golden Deer Award Changchun Film Festival Award (China), The Sun Also Rises — Best Cinematography
- 2005: Golden Rooster Awards, Letter From An Unknown Woman — Best Cinematography
- 2005 The 14th Golden Rooster and Hundred Flowers Film Festival Award, Letter From An Unknown Woman — Best Cinematography
- 2001: New York Film Critics Circle, In The Mood For Love — Best Cinematographer
- 2001: Boston Society of Film Critics, In The Mood For Love — Best Cinematography (shared 2nd place)
- 2001: Golden Horse Awards (Taiwan), Millennium Mambo — Best Cinematography
- 2001 The Government Information Office of Taiwan, In The Mood For Love — Glory Of The Country Award
- 2000 Award From The President of Taiwan, In The Mood For Love — The Light Of The Cinema Award
- 2000: Cannes Film Festival, In The Mood For Love — Technical Grand Prize
- 2000: Golden Horse Awards (Taiwan), In The Mood For Love — Best Cinematography
- 2000 Asia Pacific Film Festival Award (China), In The Mood For Love — Best Cinematography
- 1995: Golden Horse Awards (Taiwan), Summer Snow — Best Cinematography
- 1993: Golden Horse Awards (Taiwan), The Puppetmaster — Best Cinematography
- 1988 The Government Information Office of Taiwan, Dust In The Wind Glory Of The Country Award
- 1986 Three Continents Film Festival Award (France), Dust In The Wind — Best Cinematography
- 1985 Asia Pacific Film Festival Award (China), Run Away — Best Cinematography*

=== Nominations ===
- 2014: César Awards, Renoir — Best Cinematography
- 2006: Japan Academy Film Prize, Spring Snow — Best Cinematography
- 2005: Golden Horse Awards (Taiwan), Three Times — Best Cinematography
- 2002: Hong Kong Film Awards, In The Mood For Love — Best Cinematography
- 1999: Golden Horse Awards (Taiwan), — Tempting Heart - Best Cinematography
- 1998: Hong Kong Film Awards, Eighteen Springs — Best Cinematography
- 1990 Asia Pacific Film Festival Award (China), The Dull Ice Flowers — Best Cinematography
- 1987: Golden Horse Awards (Taiwan), Strawman — Best Cinematography
- 1987 Asia Pacific Film Festival Award (China), Strawman — Best Cinematography
