= Cheerful Wind =

- Film poster
- Directed by: Hou Hsiao-hsien
- Written by: Hou Hsiao-hsien
- Produced by: Yao Pai Hsueh
- Starring: Kenny Bee; Fong Fei-fei
- Cinematography: Chen Kun-hou
- Edited by: Liao Ching-sung
- Music by: Lin Tsan-Ching
- Production company: Galaxy Film Company Ltd.
- Release date: November 18, 1981 (Taiwan)
- Running time: 90 minutes
- Country: Taiwan
- Language: Mandarin

Cheerful Wind (Chinese: 風兒踢踏踩; pinyin: Feng er ti ta cai) is a 1981 Taiwanese film directed by Hou Hsiao-hsien. It is Hou's second film. The film is also known as Play While You Play.

== Plot ==
The plot revolves around the romance between a blind man and a photographer.

== Cast ==
- Kenny Bee
- Fong Fei-fei

== Release ==
The film was released for the 1982 Lunar New Year.

== Reception ==
The film was restored in 2018 and presented as follows: "Although largely crafted within the constraints of commercial genre sensibilities, the film employs a narrative approach that offers a reflection of the society of the time. Even in this early work, sketches of Hou’s signature themes can be gleaned, such as his explorations of Taiwan’s urban-rural divide and the complexities of modern love." A similar assessment can be found in various other reviews:"Acclaimed Taiwanese director Hsiao-Hsien Hou’s second feature film Cheerful Wind is a touch more accessible and a good deal lighter-hearted than the latter fare which would win him accolades and adulation in equal measure. Nonetheless, this off-kilter romcom contains clear traces of his fingerprints, from the artfully framed shots, bright colours and bouncy soundtrack, to the quirky characters and unexpected plot curvature." The first sequence, for example, is seen as a film within the film, that would characterise later Hou films. The film is also noted as an example of new trends in the Taiwanese cinema of the 1980s, with a stronger presence of youth and pop culture.
