= The Time to Live and the Time to Die =

A Time to Live, A Time to Die
- Film poster
- Chinese: 童年往事
- Literal meaning: Childhood events
- Hanyu Pinyin: Tóngnián wǎngshì
- Directed by: Hou Hsiao-hsien
- Written by: Chu T’ien-wen; Hou Hsiao-hsien
- Starring: Yu An-shun; Tien Feng; Xin Shufen
- Cinematography: Mark Lee Ping-Bin
- Edited by: Liao Ching-sung; Wang Chi-Yang
- Music by: Wu Chu-chu
- Production company: Central Motion Pictures Corporation
- Distributed by: Central Motion Pictures Corporation
- Release date: August 3, 1985 (Taiwan)
- Running time: 138 minutes
- Country: Taiwan
- Languages: Mandarin; Hakka; Taiwanese Minnan

The Time to Live and the Time to Die, also known as A Time to Live, A Time to Die is a 1985 Taiwanese film directed by Hou Hsiao-hsien. This film is inspired by Hou's own experience of growing up in Fengshan, Kaohsiung city. It is the second part of Hou's coming-of-age trilogy, preceded by A Summer at Grandpa's (1984) and followed by Dust in the Wind (1986).

== Plot ==
The Time to Live and the Time to Die adopts Hou Hsiao-hsien's own voice as the voice-over narrator to tell the story of the maturation of Ah-ha (阿孝; Hou's nickname pronounced in Hakka), which spans the years 1947 to 1965. It begins with Hou recounting how his father, who was a public servant in the Nationalist government, brought his family to Taiwan to live in Hsinchu and then moved to the dormitory in Fengshan, Kaohsiung due to his ill health.

Ah-ha's grandma would always go out to call him back for dinner and sometimes take him with her to embark on the road to go back home to China, although this is physically impossible and confuses local residents. His sickly father dies when Hou is still young, leaving his mother to raise her young children single-handedly, recounting stories from her life such as how her eldest daughter died when she was an infant. Ah-ha grows up to become a rebellious high school student. While tank tracks on the local asphalt roads indicate that Taiwan is in a state of war, this does not prevent Ah-ha from picking fights with other students and local gangs. He is defiant enough to deflate his school teacher's bike tire after a disagreement and break the window of a veteran's house.

The death of Ah-ha's mother from tongue cancer forces him to begin to change. He falls in love with a girl from another high school, who tells him she would only consider dating him after he is admitted to college, which prompts him to seriously prepare for the college entrance exam. A year later Ah-ha fails the exam. He blames himself for neglecting to take good care of his grandmother, who dies without being noticed by him or his two young brothers at home. The mortician finds that half of her body is already in decay and silently rebukes them for their lack of filial piety. The narrator ends the film by saying that he was often reminded of the road he walked with his grandmother to go back to China and the many guava they picked on the way home.

== Production ==
The Time to Live and the Time to Die is a film which is inspired by Hou Hsiao-hsien's own life story, which is shot in his old home in Fengshan District, Kaohsiung, and the voice-over in this film is also recorded by the director himself. Hou mentioned that he tried to make the film realistic to render his childhood memories on screen and that he actually cared very little about the form when shooting the film. The documentary, Portrait of Hou Hsiao-Hsien, by Olivier Assayas, begins with the segment of The Time to Live and the Time to Die. It also invites Hou to take the crew back to his hometown for a tour of the locations in The Time to Live and the Time to Die.

Nearly all of the actors in this film are non-professional and are picked by Hou. Actor Yu An-Shun and Actress Hsin Shu-fen made their debut in this film. Yu An-Shun (游安順) was introduced to Hou Hsiao-hsien by actress Yang Li-Yin (楊麗音) and cinematographer Chen Huai-En (陳懷恩). Hsin Shu-fen was discovered by Hou near a theatre in Ximending, Taipei. She was later cast in many of Hou's later films, including the acclaimed Dust in the Wind.

The film's director of sound Tu Du-Chih and cinematographer Lee Ping-Bin became Hou Hsiao-hsien's important long-term collaborators after they collaborated on this film.

Actress Mei Fang (梅芳), who could speak Taiwanese, Hakka, and Mandarin fluently, was also the dubbing instructor when the film was being filmed, who taught most of the actors how to speak Hakka.

The digital restoration of this film was released in 2013 by Central Motion Picture Corp.

== Cast ==
Actor/Actress	Role
Tian Feng (田豐)	A Xiao(阿孝)’s father
Mei Fang (梅芳)	A Xiao’s mother
Tang Ru-Yun (唐如韞)	A Xiao’s grandmother
Xiao Ai (蕭艾)	A Xiao’s sister/Hui-Lan (惠闌)
Yu An-Shun (游安順)	A Xiao/He Xiao-Yan (何孝炎)
Chen Shu-Fang (陳淑芳)	Mother of A Xia’s crush
Xin Shu-Fen (辛樹芬)	High school girl/A Xia’s crush

== Awards ==
- 1985 Golden Horse Awards
  - Nominated:
    - Best Narrative Feature: Central Motion Pictures Corporation
    - Best Director: Hou Hsiao-Hsien
    - Best Original Film Score: Wu Chu-Chu
    - Best Sound Effects: Xin Jiang-Cheng
    - Best Cinematography: Chen Huai-En
  - Won:
    - Best Supporting Actress: Tang Ru-Yun
    - Best Original Screenplay: Hou Hsiao-Hsian, Zhu Tian-Wen
- 1986 Berlin International Film Festival Forum of New Cinema
  - Won: FIPRESCI Prize
- 1987 Rotterdam International Film Festival
  - Won: Rotterdam Award – Best Non-American/Non-European Film
- 1990 Kinema Junpo Awards
  - Won: Best Foreign Language Film Director – Hou Hsiao-hsien

== Reception ==
Rotten Tomatoes reports 100% approval for The Time to Live and the Time to Die, based on five reviews with an average rating of 8.2/10. Janet Maslin of The New York Times praised its cinematography and wrote that "much of the film is about suffering and loss, detailing the painful circumstances in which family members, one by one, grow ill and die. The simplicity and tact with which these illnesses are chronicled help to give an otherwise largely uneventful film some emotional impact…It's an unpretentious and largely unremarkable film that occasionally reaches unexpected depths of feeling". Variety called it a "beautifully controlled and highly nostalgic picture of childhood".

== Legacy ==
Derek Malcolm has compared Hou Hsiao-hsien to Satyajit Ray and wrote that the film's honesty and truth "manage[s] to summon up this little microcosm of the world perfectly…Everything is right: the miraculous use of sound, the limpid cinematography, the natural acting create an atmosphere you can't forget". Jonathan Rosenbaum praised its long takes and deep focus cinematography and called it "unhurried family chronicle carries an emotional force and a historical significance that may not be immediately apparent". Geoff Andrew of Time Out wrote that "it is the unflinching, unsentimental honesty that supplies the elegiac intelligence: Hou's quiet style bursts forth, here and there, into sudden, superlative scenes of untrammelled emotional power. It's a brilliantly simple but multi-faceted portrait of loss and the complacency of childhood: quite literally, we can't go home again".

== Anecdotes ==
Actress Yang Li-Yin (楊麗音) had cooperated with Hou Hsiao-hsien for multiple times, and starred in many of his films. She volunteered to be the assistant director, who was in charge of prop in The Time to Live and the Time to Die. It was her first time as a technical crew. In an interview, she said that she didn't do well in this occupation, and after this film, Hou joked and told her she better stayed focused as an actress.

Chen Shu-Fang (陳淑芳)’s part in The Time to Live and the Time to Die was cut in the digital restoration version due to film damping. The restored version was as a result defective.
