= (Sex) Appeal =

- Directed by: Wang Wei-ming
- Screenplay by: Quentin Kun-hua Hsu
- Story by: Wang Wei-ming
- Produced by: Hsu Hsiao-ming
- Starring: Vivian Hsu; Alyssa Chia; Amber Kuo; Leon Dai
- Cinematography: Mark Lee
- Edited by: Man Chi-ming
- Music by: Annie Lo
- Production companies: Kuli Film Co., Ltd; Stellar Mega Films Limited; Guangdong 21St Century Media Co., Ltd; Le Vision Pictures (Beijing) Co., Ltd; Taiwan Pictures Co., Ltd; Arong Co., Ltd
- Release dates: September 12, 2014 (New Taipei City Film Festival); October 24, 2014 (Taiwan, China)
- Running time: 109 minutes
- Countries: Taiwan; China
- Language: Mandarin

(Sex) Appeal (Taiwan: 寒蟬效應, China: 不能说的夏天) is a 2014 Taiwanese-Chinese youth romance drama film directed by Wang Wei-ming. It was released in Taiwan and China on October 24, 2014.

== Cast ==
- Vivian Hsu as Fang An-yu
- Alyssa Chia as Lin An-ni
- Amber Kuo as Pai Hui-hua
- Leon Dai as Li Jen-fang
- Jade Chou as Wang Wen-hui
- Sean Huang
- Lene Lai as Li Ya
- Fion Fu as Fu Hsiao-ling

== Reception ==
=== Critical response ===
On Film Business Asia, Derek Elley gave it a 7 out of 10, calling it a "notable, if over-dense, drama centred on a teacher-student "rape" [that] raises the Taiwan bar."

=== Accolades ===
Award	Date	Category	Recipients and nominees	Result
Golden Horse Awards	November 22, 2014	Best Supporting Actor	Leon Dai	Nominated
Golden Horse Awards	November 22, 2014	Best Cinematography	Mark Lee	Nominated
Golden Horse Awards	November 22, 2014	Best Original Film Song	(Sex) Appeal	Nominated
