= Cute Girl =

- DVD cover
- Chinese: 就是溜溜的她
- Literal meaning: She sure is slick
- Hanyu Pinyin: jiùshì liūliū de tā
- Directed by: Hou Hsiao-hsien
- Written by: Hou Hsiao-hsien
- Starring: Kenny Bee; Anthony Chan; Fong Fei Fei
- Cinematography: Chen Kunhou
- Edited by: Liao Ching-sung
- Music by: Huang Mao-Shan
- Release date: 1980
- Running time: 90 minutes
- Country: Taiwan
- Language: Mandarin

Cute Girl, also known as Lovable You (Chinese: 就是溜溜的她 : Jiù shì liū liū di tā), is a 1980 Taiwanese romantic drama film directed by director Hou Hsiao-hsien, starring Kenny Bee, Anthony Chan and Fong Fei-fei. It was Hou Hsiao-hsien's first feature film.

== Plot ==
Wenwen, the daughter of a rich Taipei business tycoon, is set up with the son of another illustrious family for potential marriage. She flees for several days to her aunt's house in a mountain village prior to facing her potential husband. There she falls in love with Daigang, an infrastructure engineer conducting a road survey in the village. When Wenwen is called back to Taipei by her father, the lovers are split, but Daigang is not so easily defeated nor is he exactly who he seems.

== Cast ==
- Kenny Bee as Daigang
- Fong Fei-fei as Wenwen

== Reception ==
A retrospective review explains: "As author Philip Kemp rightfully points out in his essay on the filmmaker's early works, concepts such as the contrast between rural and urban Taiwan or traditional family values, represented by Wenwen's parents, are present throughout Cute Girl, even though they are more in the background it seems. At the same time, the combination of pop songs and the often corny scenes between the protagonists, especially the first concept is often on the verge of being romanticized."
