= Café Lumière =

- French promotional poster for Café Lumière
- Directed by: Hou Hsiao-hsien
- Screenplay by: Hou Hsiao-hsien; Chu T’ien-wen
- Produced by: Liao Ching-sung; Hideji Miyajima; Fumiko Osaka; Ichirō Yamamoto
- Starring: Yo Hitoto; Tadanobu Asano; Masato Hagiwara; Kimiko Yo; Nenji Kobayashi
- Cinematography: Mark Lee Ping Bin
- Edited by: Liao Ching-sung
- Music by: Yōsui Inoue
- Distributed by: Shochiku
- Release date: 2003
- Running time: 103 minutes
- Countries: Japan; Taiwan
- Language: Japanese

Café Lumière (Japanese: 珈琲時光, Hepburn: Kōhī Jikō) is a 2003 Japanese film directed by Taiwanese director Hou Hsiao-hsien for Shochiku as homage to Yasujirō Ozu, with direct reference to the late director's Tokyo Story (1953). It premiered at a festival commemorating the centenary of Ozu's birth. It was nominated for Golden Lion at the 2004 Venice Film Festival. The film, with an all-Japanese cast, is set in Tokyo, where it was shot.

== Plot ==
The story revolves around Yoko Inoue (played by Yo Hitoto), a young Japanese woman doing research on Taiwanese composer Jiang Wen-Ye, whose work is featured on the soundtrack. The late composer's Japanese wife and daughter also make appearances as themselves.

== Cast ==
- Yo Hitoto - Yoko Inoue (井上 陽子 Inoue Yōko)
- Tadanobu Asano - Hajime Takeuchi (竹内 肇 Takeuchi Hajime)
- Masato Hagiwara - Seiji
- Kimiko Yo - Yoko's stepmother
- Nenji Kobayashi - Yoko's father

== Reception ==
Café Lumière was placed at 98 on Slant's best films of the 2000s.

In 2019, director Steve McQueen named it as the best film of the 21st century, describing it as "[a] film that happens without you knowing."

Another review finds obvious similarities with Hou's earlier work in this homage to Ozu: "Visually the film is very much in line with other late 90s/early 00s Hou films, sporting rather long takes and an almost static, slow-moving camera observing the characters."

== Analysis ==
An analysis in 3 Quarks Daily explains:

The lack remains, if not as precisely identifiable a lack as in Ozu. Where the older, Japanese filmmaker illustrated the dissolution of his people's families, the younger, Taiwanese filmmaker illustrates the results of that dissolution. This more complicated situation all but demands the hybrid sort of vision you get from crossing Ozu's with Hou's. Café Lumière thus unrolls with the former's stillness, human proportion, and habitation of the architectural — looking from one door of a home through another into another — but also the latter's spontaneousness and aesthetic drift toward what's (often inexplicably) compelling. Ozu's pillow shots — character-free images of the natural and build environment included not to serve the film's story but its rhythm — like his people, stood mostly still. Hou's pillow shots, like his people, move, often with unclear motivation, but always toward what feels interesting.
