= Goodbye South, Goodbye =

- DVD Cover
- Traditional Chinese: 南國再見,南國
- Simplified Chinese: 南国再见,南国
- Literal meaning: Goodbye South, Goodbye
- Hanyu Pinyin: Nánguó zàijiàn, nánguó
- Directed by: Hou Hsiao-hsien
- Screenplay by: Chu T’ien-wen
- Story by: Jack Kao; King Jieh-Wen
- Produced by: Katsuhiro Mizuno; Shozo Ichiyama; King Jieh-wen; Huang Chong; Ben Hsieh
- Starring: Jack Kao; Lim Giong; Annie Shizuka Inoh; Hsi Hsiang; Hsu Kuei-Ying
- Cinematography: Mark Lee Ping Bin; Chen Hwai-en
- Edited by: Liao Ching-sung
- Music by: Lim Giong; Summer Lei; L.T.K.
- Production companies: 3H Films; Team Okuyama
- Release date: 12 May 1996 (Cannes)
- Running time: 116 minutes
- Countries: Taiwan; Japan
- Languages: Mandarin; Hokkien

Goodbye South, Goodbye is a 1996 Taiwanese drama film directed by Hou Hsiao-hsien. The film had its premiere at the Cannes Film Festival on 12 May 1996.

== Plot ==
Gao (Jack Kao) rides the train to Pinghsi to set up a 10-day gambling den with his friend Hsi (Hsi Hsiang). He takes his acolyte Flatty (Lim Giong) and Pretzel (Annie Shizuka Inoh), Flatty's girlfriend, who works part-time in a night club. Gao's girlfriend Ying (Hsu Kuei-Ying) works in the same night club as Pretzel and doesn't like the people around Gao, finding them dangerous. Gao has already made a deal with Hsi to invest in a nightclub in Shanghai, but Ying doesn't want him to go. Instead, she wants him to stay in Taiwan to open a restaurant. A succession of get-rich-quick schemes leads them to the brink of disaster. In the final section of the film, set in the southern city of Chiayi, the unsavory alliance between the underworld and the political elite emerges.

== Cast ==
- Jack Kao as Gao
- Lim Giong as Flat Head
- Annie Shizuka Inoh as Pretzel
- Hsi Hsiang as Hsi
- Hsu Kuei-Ying as Ying
- Lei Ming as Gao's father
- Lien Pi-tung as Tung
- Kao Ming as Ming
- Vicky Wei as Hui

== Production ==
The film includes remarkably long takes.

== Soundtrack ==
The film's soundtrack was released in Taiwan by Magic Stone in 1996, as well as in Japan by Soundtrack Listeners Communications on March 21, 1997.

== Reception ==
Goodbye South, Goodbye was entered into the 1996 Cannes Film Festival, but lost to Secrets & Lies.

=== Critical response ===
The film was chosen along with The Bridges of Madison County and Carlito's Way as the best film of the 1990s by Cahiers du cinéma. Director Luca Guadagnino also listed it as one of his 10 favorite films in the 2012 Sight & Sound poll.

== Analysis ==
A retrospective review explained:

Goodbye South, Goodbye was the first present-day-set film Hou made since Daughter of the Nile, nine years earlier. (Good Men, Good Women, made before Goodbye South, Goodbye, partly took place in the past.) In two movies since then—Millennium Mambo and Three Times—Hou has cast a sad-eyed gaze upon modern Taiwan. In all of them, Taiwanese youth are depicted as listless wastrels, addicted to distraction and unmoored from their past. His long takes don’t capture time spent so much as time squandered.
