= Once Upon a Time in Tibet =

2010 film

- Film poster
- Traditional Chinese: 西藏往事
- Simplified Chinese: 西藏往事
- Hanyu Pinyin: Xīzàng Wǎngshì
- Directed by: Dai Wei
- Written by: Tashi Dawa; Qing Mei
- Based on: Cast of Shambala by Zahi Dava
- Produced by: Dai Wei; Guo Musheng; Shen Yu
- Starring: Peter Ho; Joshua Hannum; Song Jia; Zhu Ziyan; Tino Bao; Sam-Co
- Cinematography: Mark Lee Ping Bin
- Music by: Liu Tong
- Production companies: Beijing Gelan Haikuo Culture Media Co., Ltd. Taiwan Longxiang Entertainment Multimedia Limited Liability Company; Beijing Zidingxiang Television Culture Communication Co., Ltd.
- Distributed by: China Film Group Corporation; Beijing Zidingxiang Television Culture Communication Co., Ltd.
- Release date: 16 October 2010 (China)
- Running time: 96 minutes
- Country: China
- Languages: Mandarin; Tibetan
- Budget: 7 million

Once Upon a Time in Tibet, also known as American Pilot, is a 2010 Chinese romantic comedy film directed and co-produced by Dai Wei, and starring Peter Ho, Joshua Hannum, Song Jia, Zhu Ziyan, Tino Bao, and Sam-Co. The film is an adaptation of Tashi Dawa's novel Cats of Shambala. The film tells the story of Robert and Yong Cuo's transnational love story.

== Cast ==
- Song Jia as Yong Cuo, a kind of simple Tibetan women and a single mother.
- Joshua Hannum as Robert, an American pilot.
- Peter Ho as Jiang Cuo, a young Tibetan serf, he loves Yang Jin.
- Zhu Ziyan as Yang Jin, a Tibetan herdsmen's daughter, she loves Jiang Cuo.
- Tino Bao as ROC Commissioner for Tibet.
- Sam-Co

== Music ==
- Tan Weiwei and Chongshol Dolma - Pray
- Zhu Ziyan - Life

== Production ==
Production started in September 2009 and ended on March 17, 2010.

The film was shot in Tibetan Plateau, including Nagqu Prefecture and Namtso.

== Release ==
The film was released on October 16, 2010, in China.

== Accolades ==
Year	Award	Category	Recipient(s) and nominee(s)	Ref
2014	Beijing College Student Film Festival	Best Film	Nominated	
2014	Beijing College Student Film Festival	Best Director	Nominated	
2014	Beijing College Student Film Festival	Best Actor	Nominated	
2014	Beijing College Student Film Festival	Best Actress	Nominated	
2014	Beijing College Student Film Festival	Favorite Director	Nominated	
2014	Beijing College Student Film Festival	Favorite Actor	Nominated	
2014	Beijing College Student Film Festival	Favorite Actress	Nominated	
