= City of Jade =

2016 documentary by Midi Z

- 翡翠之城
- Directed by: Midi Z
- Cinematography: Midi Z
- Edited by: Lin Sheng-Wen
- Music by: Lim Giong
- Distributed by: Seashore Image Production Co., Ltd
- Release date: 2016
- Running time: 98
- Country: Taiwan
- Languages: Burmese; Mandarin

City of Jade is a 2016 documentary film directed by Chinese-Burmese director Midi Z. The film won the Best Original Film Score at the 53rd Golden Horse Awards.

== Synopsis ==
Following his previous work Jade Miners, which filmed the workers in the jade mines of Kachin State, Myanmar, the director turned his camera toward his brother, who served as a foreman at the Hpakant jade mine in Kachin State. The film took three years producing. It explores why the director's brother addicted to drug after working, disconnected from his family, and ultimately was sent to prison. Additionally, it retrospects to the sacrifices made by the brother, comparing it to the resources the director gained to pursue his education in Taiwan.

Apart from depicting the director's perspective, it also portrays a microcosm of many workers in Myanmar who engage in jade mining in the hopes of becoming rich overnight within the context of poverty and a tumultuous society.

== Awards ==
Year	Award	Category	Name	Outcome	Ref.
2016	Taipei Film Awards	Best Music	LIM Giong	Won	
2016	53rd Golden Horse Awards	Best Original Film Score	LIM Giong	Won	
2016	53rd Golden Horse Awards	Best Documentary	City of Jade	Nominated	
2017	Yamagata International Documentary Film Festival	Special Mentions	City of Jade	Won	
