= The Green, Green Grass of Home =

- Film poster
- Chinese: 在那河畔青草青
- Literal meaning: Green grass by the river
- Hanyu Pinyin: zài nà hépàn qīngcǎo qīng
- Directed by: Hou Hsiao-hsien
- Written by: Hou Hsiao-hsien
- Produced by: Chen Kun-hou
- Starring: Kenny Bee; Chen Mei-feng
- Cinematography: Chen Kun-hou
- Edited by: Liao Ching-sung
- Music by: Huang Mao-Shan
- Production company: Tung Tai Film Company
- Release date: 1983
- Running time: 90 minutes
- Country: Taiwan
- Language: Mandarin

The Green, Green Grass of Home (Chinese: 在那河畔青草青) is a 1983 Taiwanese film directed by Hou Hsiao-hsien. It is Hou's third film.

== Plot ==
In a village in rural Taiwan, a new schoolteacher, coming from Taipei, falls in love with a local young woman.

== Cast ==
- Kenny Bee
- Chen Mei-feng

== Release ==
A Blu-Ray version was released in 2016. The film is also part of the Early Hou Hsiao-sien DVD set.

== Reception ==
A retrospective review, comparing the film to Hou's earlier productions, states that "The Green, Green Grass of Home ... builds on the nostalgic pastoral mode of Cute Girl, but represents an exponential improvement. Here, Hou refines his camera work with assured compositions and rich mise en scène, while further exploring the playful masculinity of Cute Girl. Bee returns as another urban interloper, but here as an environmentally minded teacher. There is a romantic subplot with another teacher, but the film is at its most rewarding when following the antics of the young boys who dub themselves ‘the three musketeers’. Among other things the acting of the children in the film was praised.
