= Heartbreak Island =

- Film poster
- Chinese: 去年冬天
- Literal meaning: Last Year's Winter
- Hanyu Pinyin: Qùnián Dōngtiān
- Directed by: Hsu Hsiao-ming
- Written by: Kuo Cheng; John S.C. Chiang
- Produced by: Grant Chang; Tommy Wang
- Starring: Vicky Wei; King Jieh-wen
- Cinematography: Yang Wei-han
- Edited by: Chen Bo-wen
- Music by: Chyi Chin & Red Band
- Production company: Scholar Films
- Release date: 1995
- Running time: 118 minutes
- Country: Taiwan
- Languages: Mandarin; Hokkien

Heartbreak Island is a 1995 Taiwanese drama film directed by Hsu Hsiao-ming. The film follows a recently released woman prisoner as she visits her ex who was arrested in the 1979 Kaohsiung Incident but released before her. The film makes extensive use of flashbacks to illustrate the woman's thoughts.

Writing for The New York Times, Stephen Holden wrote: "The mood of Heartbreak Island is so glumly monochromatic that the characters remain at a chilly distance, and the movie remains locked in its own sealed-off sense of despair."

== Cast ==
- Vicky Wei as Chen Linlang
  - Chen Yishan as Chen Linlang (child)
- King Jieh-wen as Wang Rong, former dissident, Chen Linlang's former teacher and lover
- Chang Ching-ju as An-an, Wang Rong's wife
- Wen Ying as Wang Rong's mother
- Chang Chiao-ling as Chiao-ling, An-an's younger sister
- Tsai Chen-nan as Jin Guang, former dissident who wants to run for president
- Lin Ju as former dissident running a night market business
- Meng Ting-li as Chen Linlang's ex-classmate and friend
- Tien Meng as Chen Linlang's neighbor in the military dependents' village
- Lo Bin as Wang Rong's father (flashback)
- Wang Hsin-ju as Chen Linlang's mother (flashback)
- Chyi Chin as pub singer

== Accolades ==
1995 Cannes Film Festival

- Screened at the Directors' Fortnight parallel section.

1996 International Film Festival Rotterdam

- Won—Network for the Promotion of Asian Cinema Award (tied with Nostalgia for Home Country)
