= A Summer at Grandpa's =

- Film poster
- Chinese: 冬冬的假期
- Literal meaning: Dong-Dong's holiday
- Hanyu Pinyin: Dōngdōng de jiàqī
- Directed by: Hou Hsiao-hsien
- Written by: Chu Tʻien-wen; Hou Hsiao-hsien
- Produced by: Wu Wu-Fu
- Cinematography: Chen Kun-hou
- Edited by: Liao Ching-sung
- Music by: Edward Yang
- Production company: Marble Road Productions
- Release date: November 24, 1984 (Taiwan)
- Running time: 94 minutes
- Country: Taiwan
- Languages: Mandarin; Hakka

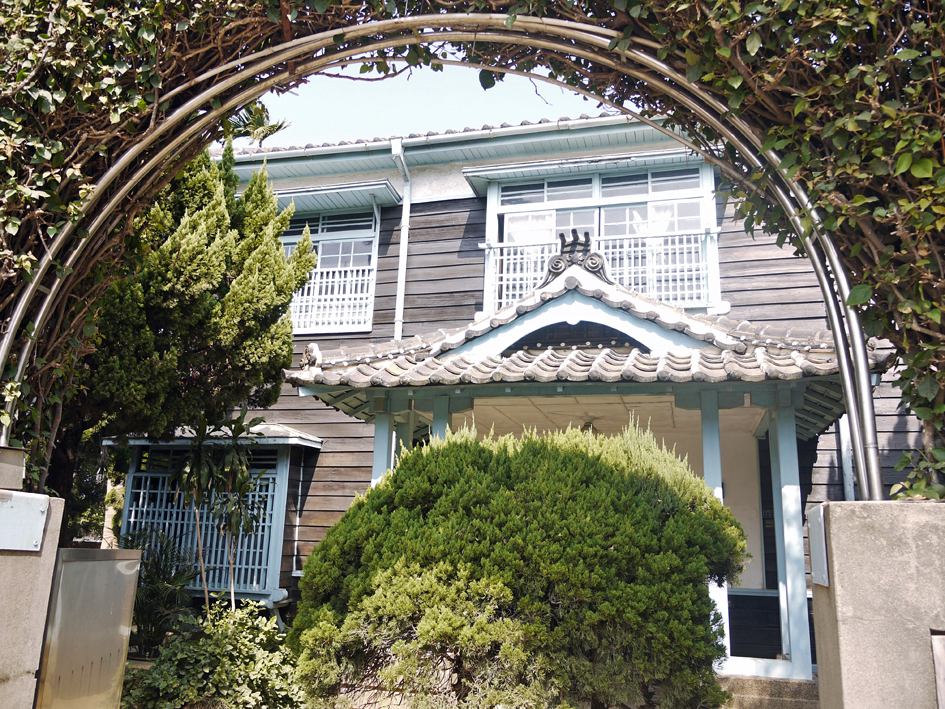
Chongguang Clinic in Tongluo Township is one of the filming locations for A Summer at Grandpa's

A Summer at Grandpa's (Chinese: 冬冬的假期; pinyin: Dōngdōng de jiàqī) is a 1984 Taiwanese coming-of-age family drama directed by Hou Hsiao-hsien and co-written with Hou by Chu Tʽien-wen. The film tells the semi-autobiographical exploits of a young brother and sister who spend a pivotal summer in the country with their grandparents while their mother is in critical care in the hospital.

The film was Hou's sixth overall, and first after his international breakthrough The Boys from Fengkuei (1983).

A Summer at Grandpa's was well received by critics in Taiwan and on the American and European festival circuits, winning the Jury Prize at the Locarno Film Festival in 1985 and the Golden Montgolfier at the 1985 Nantes Three Continents Film Festival.

== Plot ==
A young boy, Tung-Tung and his sister spend a summer vacation at their grandparents' house in the country while their mother recuperates from an illness; they while away the hours climbing trees, swimming in a stream, searching for missing cattle, and coming uneasily to grips with the enigmatic and sometimes threatening realities of adult life.

== Reception ==
On the review aggregator website Rotten Tomatoes, A Summer at Grandpa's hold a rare approval rating of 100%, based on 5 reviews with an average of 8.1/10.

In his review for The New York Times, Vincent Canby wrote: "The film is easy to watch. It's nicely acted by Wang Chi-kwang as Tung-Tung and Koo Chuen as the grandpa. It avoids artificial melodrama and, like a picturesque landscape, it is soothing and just a little bit boring". Pat Graham of the Chicago Reader gave the film a positive review, calling the film a "lyrical childhood remembrance" and praising the "fine, unsentimental attention to childhood incident".
