= Taipei Story =

1985 film by Edward Yang

- Theatrical release poster
- Traditional Chinese: 青梅竹馬
- Simplified Chinese: 青梅竹马
- Literal meaning: Childhood Sweethearts
- Hanyu Pinyin: Qīngméizhúmǎ
- Hokkien POJ: Chheng-mûi-tiok-má
- Directed by: Edward Yang
- Written by: Hou Hsiao-hsien; Chu Tʽien-wen; Edward Yang
- Produced by: Huang Yung; Lin Jung-feng; Liu Sheng-chung
- Starring: Hou Hsiao-hsien; Tsai Chin
- Cinematography: Yang Wei-han
- Edited by: Wang Chi-yang; Sung Fan-chen
- Music by: Edward Yang
- Release date: 1985
- Running time: 110 minutes
- Country: Taiwan
- Languages: Mandarin; Hokkien

Taipei Story (Chinese: 青梅竹馬) is a 1985 Taiwanese drama film co-written and directed by Edward Yang. It stars Hou Hsiao-hsien and Tsai Chin and follows the grinding relationship of Ah-lung and Ah-chen, who have known each other since childhood in Taipei. It is doomed to fail because Ah-lung cannot forget about the past while Ah-chen is eager to embrace the future as Taipei undergoes modernization and globalization. Taipei Story is one of the representative films of the New Taiwanese Cinema. It won the FIPRESCI Prize at the 38th Locarno Film Festival in 1985.

In the United States, Janus Films gave a limited release of the film's 4K restoration, done by the World Cinema Project, on March 17, 2017.

== Title ==
The literal meaning of the Chinese title, Qing Mei Zhu Ma (青梅竹馬) is a Chinese idiom, "green plums and a bamboo horse". It alludes to an 8th-century poem by Li Bai, and is used to refer to a childhood sweetheart. The English title Taipei Story marks the theme of the failed love story: the Taipei City, which is the common theme in all of Edward Yang's films, including notably The Terrorizers (恐怖份子; 1986) and A One and A Two (一一; 2000).

== Plot ==
Senior assistant Ah-chen becomes unemployed when the construction company she works for is acquired. Renting an apartment by herself, she gives a spare set of keys to Ah-lung, her childhood sweetheart and former Little League World Series winner, who runs a cloth shop on Dihua Street. She also maintains an ambiguous relationship with a married architect in her former company who is supposedly experiencing marital troubles.

While Ah-chen plans to immigrate to the United States with Ah-lung to join his brother-in-law's import business, Ah-lung is not as keen on moving. His passivity and traditional outlook increasingly become a source of frustration for her. Ah-chen is displeased when Ah-lung, using the money set aside for their emigration, helps her irresponsible and chauvinist father pay back his debts. When she discovers that Ah-lung stopped by Tokyo to meet his former lover on his way back from a trip to the US, the two have a heated argument and break up afterwards.

Ah-lung falls to gambling and drinking, while Ah-chen finds limited solace in her younger sister's gang of delinquent youths. She later discovers that the architect appears happily married with his wife. A young man in the gang develops a crush on Ah-chen, though she remains ambivalent. When she sees the young man in front of her apartment building one night, she calls Ah-lung for help. Once Ah-lung takes her back to her apartment, Ah-chen invites him in, hoping to mend their relationship. She asks him to marry her, but he declines, saying that neither marriage nor emigration can solve their problems.

Ah-lung tells the young man to stop stalking Ah-chen on his way out before taking a taxi home. Realizing that the young man has been following him, Ah-lung leaves the taxi to beat him up. Their fight ends with the young man stabbing Ah-lung and riding away on his motorcycle. A profusely bleeding Ah-lung wanders the empty mountain road and stops to sit by a pile of trash. Hallucinating a news reel of his Little League glory playing on a broken TV set, he lights a cigarette and chuckles. His body is discovered the next morning.

Unaware of Ah-lung's death, Ah-chen accompanies her former boss Mrs. Mei to inspect a new office space for the local branch of a US electronic company she plans to set up. While Mrs. Mei is excited for the new prospect, Ah-chen stares out the window at a loss regarding her future with Ah-lung.

== Cast ==
- Tsai Chin (蔡琴) as Ah-chen, an office worker
- Hou Hsiao-hsien (侯孝賢) as Ah-lung, a cloth shop owner and former baseball player
- Wu Nien-jen (吳念真) as Ch'en, Ah-lung's friend, a taxi driver and former baseball player
- Lin Hsiu-ling (林秀玲) as Ling, Ah-chen's little sister
- Ko I-chen (柯一正) as Mr. Ke, Ah-chen's colleague and an architect
- Ke Su-yun (柯素雲) as Ah-gwan, Ah-lung's ex-girlfriend
- Wu Ping-nan (吳柄南) as Ah-chen's father
- Mei Fang (梅芳) as Ah-chen's mother
- Chen Shu-fang (陳淑芳) as Mrs. Mei, Ah-chen's boss
- Yang Li-yin (楊麗音) as Ch'en's wife
- Lai Te-nan (賴德南) as Mr. Lai, a baseball coach

== Themes ==
According to the Doc Film Society, the film "displays Yang's uncompromising critique of the middle-class with its dissection of its heroine's emotional fragility, vainly disguised behind the sunglasses she sports day and night. As she flees the past, her boyfriend idealistically clings to it, a Confucian rigidity toward which Yang bears still less patience."

== Production ==
Leading actress Tsai Chin fell in love with Edward Yang during the shooting and they married in 1985.

Hou Hsiao-hsien, who is the leading actor in the film and one of the representative directors of Taiwan's new wave cinema, used to be a friend of Yang. Hou's character and performance inspired Yang to write the script of Taipei Story and the characteristics of Ah-lung refer to the personal experience of Hou.

At that time, Yang did not have enough money to make Taipei Story. Hou invested 3 million in the production. Due to the film's box office underperformance, it was only screened for four days in theaters.

The film was digitally restored (4K) by the World Cinema Foundation Project in association with Taiwan Film Institute (now Taiwan Film and Audiovisual Center), Royal Film Archive of Belgium, and Hou in 2017.

== Reception ==
On the review aggregator website Rotten Tomatoes, 100% of 6 critics' reviews are positive, with an average rating of 8/10.

== Accolades ==
Hou's performance in Taipei Story, his first experience acting on screen, earned him a nomination for Best Leading Actor at the 22nd Golden Horse Awards. He fell one vote short of the award, losing to Hong Kong actor Donald Chow Yun Fat (周潤發) for his performance in Hong Kong 1941. Yang Wei-han was also nominated for Best Cinematography at the 22nd Golden Horse Awards.

The film won the FIPRESCI Prize at the 38th Locarno Film Festival in 1985.
