= Edward Yang =

Taiwanese-American filmmaker (1947–2007)

- 楊德昌
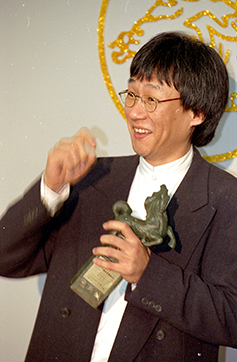
- Yang in 1994
- Born: November 6, 1947; Shanghai, Republic of China
- Died: June 29, 2007 (aged 59); Beverly Hills, California, U.S.
- Citizenship: Republic of China (Taiwan); American
- Education: National Chiao Tung University (BS); University of Florida (MS); University of Southern California (attended)
- Spouse: Tsai Chin (m. 1985–1995) Kaili Peng (m. 1995)
- Awards: Best Director Award (Cannes Film Festival); 2000 Yi Yi; Golden Horse Awards – Best Film; 1986 Terrorizers; 1991 A Brighter Summer Day; Best Original Screenplay; 1994 A Confucian Confusion

Chinese name
- Traditional Chinese: 楊德昌
- Simplified Chinese: 杨德昌
Transcriptions
Standard Mandarin
- Hanyu Pinyin: Yáng Déchāng

Edward Yang (Chinese: 楊德昌; pinyin: Yáng Déchāng; November 6, 1947 – June 29, 2007) was a Taiwanese and American filmmaker. He rose to prominence as a pioneer in the Taiwanese New Wave of the 1980s, alongside fellow auteurs Hou Hsiao-hsien and Tsai Ming-liang. Yang was regarded as one of the greatest filmmakers of Taiwanese cinema. He won the Best Director Award at Cannes for his 2000 film Yi Yi.

== Youth and early career ==
Yang was born in Shanghai, China, in 1947, where his parents worked for a bank. His family fled mainland China for Taiwan in 1949 following the defeat of the Kuomintang, and Yang grew up in Taipei. After studying electrical engineering in National Chiao Tung University (located in Hsinchu, Taiwan), where he received his bachelor's degree (BSEE), he enrolled in the graduate program at the University of Florida, where he received his master's degree in electrical engineering in 1974. During this time and briefly afterwards, Yang worked at the Center for Informatics Research at the University of Florida. Yang always had a great interest in film ever since he was a child, but put away his aspirations in order to pursue a career in the high-tech industry.

A brief enrollment at USC Film School after graduating with his M.S.E.E. convinced Yang that the world of film was not for him – he thought USC film school's teaching methodologies were too commercial and mainstream oriented. Yang then applied and was accepted into Harvard's architecture school, the Harvard Graduate School of Design, but decided not to attend. Thereafter, he went to Seattle to work in microcomputers and defense software.

While working in Seattle, Yang came across the Werner Herzog film Aguirre, the Wrath of God (1972): this encounter rekindled Yang's passion for film and introduced him to a wide range of classics in world and European cinema. Yang was particularly inspired by the films of Italian director Michelangelo Antonioni.

== Film career ==
=== Early works ===
Yang returned to Taiwan in 1980, where his former USC friend Wei-Cheng Yu asked him to write the script for and serve as a production aide on his film, The Winter of 1905 (1981), in which he also had a small acting role. The film went on to be nominated for a Best Cinematography award at the 1982 Golden Horse Film Festival and Awards. His script brought him to the attention of Sylvia Chang, who hired him to write and direct an episode of the television miniseries she was producing, Eleven Women. Yang's two-and-a-half hour episode, "Duckweed" (also known as "Floating Weeds"), concerned the story of a country girl who moves to Taipei with dreams of entering the entertainment industry, and was his first directorial effort.

The following year, Yang was asked to direct and write a short for the seminal Taiwanese New Wave omnibus film In Our Time (1982), which featured other short films from fresh young directors such as Yi Chang, Ko I-Chen, and Tao Te-chen. Yang's contribution, "Desires" (also known as "Expectation"), is about a young girl's experiences going through puberty.

=== First feature films ===
Yang then followed that short with several of his major works. While his contemporary Hou Hsiao-hsien focused more on the countryside, Yang was a poet of the city, analyzing the environment and relationships of urban Taiwan in nearly all his films. Yang's first feature film, That Day, on the Beach (1983), was a fractured modernist narrative reflecting on couples and families that spliced timelines. The film is also notable as being one of the first films—and perhaps first feature film—that Christopher Doyle received a Director of Photography credit for before going on to become Wong Kar Wai's frequent collaborator and cinematographer, along with DP Hui Kung Chang, who went on to provide the cinematography for many of Yang's later films. The film also won a Best Cinematography award from the 1983 Asia-Pacific Film Festival, and was nominated for three awards at the 1983 Golden Horse Film Festival and Awards: Best Feature Film, Best Director (Yang), and Best Original Screenplay (Wu Nien-jen and Edward Yang). Screenwriter Wu Nien-jen would later collaborate with Yang as an actor, in Taipei Story (1985) (as the Taxi Driver), Mahjong (1996) (as a Gangster in Black Suit) and as the star "N.J." in Yi Yi (2000). For the film, Yang was also nominated for the Golden Montgolfiere award at the 1983 Nantes Three Continents Festival.

Yang followed with his second feature film, Taipei Story (1985), where he cast fellow auteur Hou Hsiao-hsien as the lead, a former Little-League baseball star named Lung trying to find his way in Taipei. Taipei Story also starred Yang's future wife, Tsai Chin, as Chin, the female lead and girlfriend of Hou Hsiao-hsien's character, Lung. The film was also nominated for two awards at the 1985 Golden Horse Film Festival and Awards: Best Leading Actor (Hou Hsiao-hsien) and Best Cinematography (Wei-han Yang).

Yang's third feature film was Terrorizers (1986), a complex multi-narrative urban thriller that reflected on city life and contained the crime elements and alienation themes of an Antonioni film. The film also starred Cora Miao and won a Silver Leopard at The Locarno International Film Festival and was examined by Fredric Jameson in The Geopolitical Aesthetic. In addition, Terrorizers won the Best Film award at the 1986 Golden Horse Film Festival, where actress Cora Miao was also nominated for a Best Actress award. In addition, the film won the Sutherland Trophy at the 1987 British Film Institute Awards, and a Best Screenplay Award (awarded to writers Edward Yang and Hsiao Yeh) from the 1987 Asia-Pacific Film Festival.

=== 1990's ===
Yang's fourth film was A Brighter Summer Day (1991) (The Chinese title of "Gǔ lǐng jiē shàonián shārén shìjiàn" literally translating to: "The Murder Incident of the Boy on Guling Street"), a sprawling examination of youth-teen gangs, 1949 Taiwanese societal developments, and American pop culture starring a then 15-year-old Chang Chen. The film also stars Lisa Yang, Kuo-Chu Chang, Elaine Jin and Yang's then-wife Tsai Chin in a small role as Wang's wife.

The film is considered by many critics to be Yang's defining masterpiece. For A Brighter Summer Day, Yang won the FIPRESCI Prize and a Special Jury Prize (and was nominated for the Tokyo Grand Prix) at The Tokyo International Film Festival, and a Golden Horse award for Best Film as well as Best Original Screenplay, credited to writers Edward Yang, Hung Hung, Alex Yang, and Mingtai Lai. The film was also nominated for a total of ten other Golden Horse awards, including Best Leading Actor (Chang Chen), Best Leading Actress (Lisa Yang), Best Director (Edward Yang), Best Leading Actor (Kuo-Chu Chang), Best Supporting Actress (Elaine Jin), Best Supporting Actress (Hsiu-Chiung Chang), Best Cinematography (Hui Kung Chang), Best Art Director (Edward Yang and Wei-yen Yu), Best Makeup & Costume Design (Wei-yen Yu), and Best Sound Recording (Duu-Chih Tu and Ching-an Yang). The film also won the Best Film award at the 1991 Asia-Pacific Film Festival, a Best Foreign Language Film Director Award for Yang at the 1993 Kinema Jumpo Awards, another Best Director award for Yang at the Nantes Three Continents Festival (where Yang was also nominated for the Golden Montgolfiere award) and the Silver Screen Award for "Best Director – Asian Feature Film" for Yang at the Singapore International Film Festival.

Yang's fifth film was A Confucian Confusion (1994), a multi-character comedy set in urban Taiwan, which was nominated for a Palme d'Or and in competition at the 1994 Cannes Film Festival and also garnered a Golden Horse Award for Best Screenplay Originally Written for The Screen. The film also won a Best Supporting Actor award (Bosen Wang) and a Best Supporting Actress award (Elaine Jin) at the 1994 Golden Horse Film Festival. Also at the Golden Horse Film Festival that year, the film also received a total of 9 nominations: Best Feature Film (Executive Producer David Sui), Best Leading Actress (Shu-Chun Ni), Best Makeup & Costume Design (Edward Yang and Tsai Chin), Best Original Film Score (Antonio Lee), Best Film Editing (Po-Wen Chen), Best Sound Effects (Duu-Chih Tu), Best Director (Edward Yang), Best Cinematography (Chan Chang, Lung-Yu Li, Arthur Wong and Wu-Hsiu Hung), and Best Art Direction (Edward Yang, Ernest Guan and Jui-Chung Yao).

Yang's sixth film was Mahjong (1996), a sharp, incisive reflection of modern urban-Taiwan seen through foreign eyes, which also starred several foreign actors, which won an Honourable Mention at the 46th Berlin International Film Festival, where it was also nominated for the Golden Berlin Bear award. The film also garnered Yang another Silver Screen Award for "Best Asian Director" at The Singapore International Film Festival, his second award of this type, as well as an Award of the City of Nantes from the Nantes Three Continents Festival, where it was also nominated for a Golden Montgolfiere award. Actor Chi-tsan Wang also won a Best Supporting Actor award at the 1996 Golden Horse Film Festival, where the film was also nominated for a Best Makeup & Costume Design award (Chi-chien Chao).

=== Final work ===
Yang is best-known for his seventh and final film, Yi Yi (2000) (full title in some areas: Yi Yi: A One and A Two) – it was for this film that he received the Best Director at the 2000 Cannes Film Festival where it was also in competition and nominated for the prestigious Palme d'Or. Yi Yi is an epic story about the Jian family seen through three different perspectives: the father NJ (Wu Nien-jen), the son Yang-Yang (Jonathan Chang), and the daughter, Ting-Ting (Kelly Lee). The three-hour piece starts with a wedding, concludes with a funeral, and contemplates all areas of human life in between with profound humor, beauty and tragedy. The film is also best summarized by film critic Nigel Andrews, who stated in the Financial Times that "[t]o describe [Yi Yi] as a three-hour Taiwanese family drama is like calling Citizen Kane a film about a newspaper."

The film was named "Best Film of the Year" (2000) by the following film critics and writers: A.O. Scott of The New York Times, Susan Sontag writing for Artforum, Michael Atkinson of the Village Voice, Steven Rosen of the Denver Post, John Anderson, Jan Stuart and Gene Seymour writing for Newsday, and Stephen Garrett as well as Nicole Keeter of Time Out New York.

=== Plays and other work ===
In 1986, Adult Game, a feature-length collection of music videos featuring Tsai Chin co-directed by Yang, Hou Hsiao-hsien and Chen Kuo-fu, was released on VHS.

In 1989, Yang formed his own production company, "Yang and his Gang", which was renamed "Atom Films and Theater" in 1992, after one of Yang's favorite anime television shows while growing up, Osamu Tezuka's Astro Boy. Atom Films and Theater not only was involved in the production and financing of films, but also staged theatrical productions and plays, as well as experimental high-tech multimedia pieces.

In 1992, Yang also put on a production of a play he wrote entitled Likely Consequence, the videotaped performance of which can be viewed on the Criterion Collection edition of A Brighter Summer Day and on the A Confucian Confusion and Mahjong set. This was followed in 1993 by Growth Period, another filmed play directed by him.

In addition to narrative works, Yang also worked in the advertisement business, having directed a 1997 TV commercial for Mitsubishi with music composed by his then-wife Kaili Peng.

In 2001, Yang had finished a script about a young kid who travels the world with just a cellphone and a credit card. Regarding that, he said, "those two things are all you need now. It's a new world and there are a lot of stories we can tell each other." In the same year, Yang also hoped to make a film in Seattle and a World War II story set in Taiwan.

In addition to these unrealized projects, Yang planned to make The Wind, an animated feature with Jackie Chan budgeted at $25 million, to be drawn by Yang, heading a team of animators.

== Career influences ==
In 1993, Yang's list of the all-time top ten films was published in the Taiwanese film magazine Influence. Among the films chosen were Andrei Tarkovsky's Nostalghia, Alain Resnais's My American Uncle, David Lynch's Blue Velvet and Werner Herzog's Aguirre, the Wrath of God, possibly Yang's most important influence of his career:

Among the many films, it is difficult for me to single out one that has made the most profound impact on me. There are two waves of film movements that have deeply impacted me—the Japanese films of the 1960s and the New German Cinema of the 1970s. Apart from that, a series of films by Werner Herzog have the most profound impact on me. I had already given up on my desire to become a filmmaker at that time, but his work reignited my passion. The simplicity and directness of his visual language resonated deep within my soul, reviving my breath and heartbeat. His independence and perseverance, in particular, convinced me that a film could be accomplished through the determination of one person, a belief that remains steadfast to this day. If I were to choose my favourite movie, if I had to pick just one, it would be Herzog’s Aguirre, the Wrath of God, the first of his works I encountered.

— Edward Yang, excerpt from “The Movies I Like” in United Daily News, 1994

== Style and themes ==
Yang's visual style comprehended deliberate pacing, long takes, fixed camera, few closeups, empty spaces, and cityscapes.

Yang, in addition to being interested in the impact of the changes of Taiwanese society on the middle classes, attempted to examine the struggle between the modern and the traditional in his films, as well as the relationship between business and art, and how greed may corrupt, influence, or affect art. For that reason, many of his films (other than Yi Yi) are extremely difficult to find, since Yang did not consider selling films for money his primary purpose as an artist, and also felt that film distribution, especially in Taiwan, was something out of his control.

Yang always set his work in the cities of Taiwan. As a result, Yang's films—especially A Confucian Confusion, Taipei Story, Mahjong and Terrorizers—are commentaries on Taiwanese urban life and explorations of Taiwanese urban society.

Yang also collaborated with many of his fellow Taiwanese film-makers in his films: for instance, in Yi Yi he cast as the lead well-known auteur, novelist, and screenwriter Wu Nien-jen, director of the award-winning A Borrowed Life, which Martin Scorsese has cited as one of his favorite works and one of the most influential films of the '90s. He also cast fellow film-maker Hou Hsiao-hsien as the lead in his 1985 film, Taipei Story, where Wu Nien-jen also had a brief part as a taxi driver and an old friend of Hou Hsiao-hsien's character. Yang also taught theatre and film classes at the Taipei National University of the Arts. Several of his students showed up in his films as actors and actresses.

== Personal life ==
He married Taiwanese pop-singer and music legend Tsai Chin in May 1985. They divorced in August 1995, and he subsequently married pianist Kaili Peng (彭鎧立).

== Death ==
Yang died on June 29, 2007, at his home in Beverly Hills, as a result of complications from a seven-year struggle with colon cancer. He is survived by his wife, concert pianist Kaili Peng, and son Sean.

Yang was interred at Pierce Brothers Westwood Village Memorial Park and Mortuary.

== Filmography ==
Feature films
Year	English title	Original title	Director	Writer	Notes
1981	Duckweed	浮萍	Yes	Yes	two-part episode for TV miniseries Eleven Women
1982	In Our Time	光陰的故事	Yes	Yes	segment "Expectation" only
1982	The Winter of 1905	一九零五的冬天	No	Yes	
1983	That Day, on the Beach	海灘的一天	Yes	Yes	Co-written with Wu Nien-jen
1985	Taipei Story	青梅竹馬	Yes	Yes	Co-written with Hou Hsiao-hsien and Chu Tʽien-wen
1986	Terrorizers	恐怖份子	Yes	Yes	Co-written with Hsiao Yeh
1991	A Brighter Summer Day	牯嶺街少年殺人事件	Yes	Yes	Co-written with Lai Ming-tang and Yang Shunqing
1994	A Confucian Confusion	獨立時代	Yes	Yes	Co-written with Hung Hung
1996	Mahjong	麻將	Yes	Yes	
2000	Yi Yi	一一	Yes	Yes	

Other work

- Adult Game (1986), a feature-length music video co-directed by Yang with Hou Hsiao-hsien and Chen Kuo-fu
- Likely Consequence (1992), a filmed play written and directed by Yang
- Growth Period (1993), a presumably lost filmed play directed by Yang

== Accolades ==
Yi Yi won the "Best Film" award from the National Society of Film Critics (USA) in 2001 (where Yang also won 2nd place for a Best Director award), the "Best Foreign Film" award from the 2000 Los Angeles Film Critics Association Awards, the "Best Foreign Film" award from the 2000 New York Film Critics Circle Awards, the Panorama Jury Prize from the 2000 Sarajevo Film Festival, the Chief Dan George Humanitarian Award (for Yang) at the 2000 Vancouver International Film Festival, a "Best Film – China/Taiwan" award and "Best Director" award from the 2002 Chinese Film Media Awards, a "Best Film" award at the 2001 Chinese Film Media Awards, a "Best Foreign Film" critics award from the 2001 French Syndicate of Cinema Critics, the Grand Prix award from the 2001 Fribourg International Film Festival, and the Netpac Award from the 2000 Karlovy Vary International Film Festival ("For the perceptive and sensitive portrayal of a generation and cultural gap in Taiwan and the painful choices to be made in these difficult times."). The film also won 2nd place for Best Director, Best Film and Best Foreign Language Film in the 2000 Boston Society of Film Critics Awards, and was also nominated for: a Best Foreign Language Film award from the Awards Circuit Community Awards, a Best Non-American Film award from the 2003 Bodil Awards, a Best Foreign Language Film award from the 2001 Chicago Film Critics Association Awards, the Best Cast, Best Movie and Best Original Screenplay from the 2002 Chlotrudis Awards, a Best Foreign Film award from the 2001 Cesar Awards, a Screen International Award from the 2000 European Film Awards, a Best Asian Film award from the 2002 Hong Kong Film Awards, a Best Foreign Language Film award from the Online Film & Television Association, a Best Foreign Language Film award from the 2001 Online Film Critics Society Awards, and a Golden Spike award from the 2000 Valladolid International Film Festival.

At the 2007 Pusan International Film Festival, Yang won an award for Asian Filmmaker of the Year, and was also immortalized with a hand-printing at the festival along with Ennio Morricone, Seung-ho Kim, Volker Schlöndorff, Dariush Mehrjui and Claude Lelouch. In 2007, Yang also won a Lifetime Achievement Award from the Golden Horse Film Festival and Awards that year.

Yi Yi also placed third in a 2009 Village Voice Film Poll ranking "The Best Film of the Decade," tying with La Commune (Paris, 1871) (2000) and Zodiac (2007), and also placed third in a 2009 IndieWire Critics' Poll of the "Best Film of the Decade."

== Legacy ==
In 2000, Yang formed Miluku Technology & Entertainment to produce animated films and TV shows. The first animated feature that Miluku was slated to produce was an animated feature titled The Wind with Jackie Chan in 2007, but the project was cut short when Yang fell ill with cancer.
