= Fong Fei-fei =

Fong Fei-Fei
- 鳳飛飛
- Born: Lim Chiu-Luan; 20 August 1953; Taoyuan, Taiwan
- Died: 3 January 2012 (aged 58); St. Teresa's Hospital, Kowloon City, Hong Kong
- Burial place: Fo Guang Shan Bao Ta Temple, Dashu, Kaohsiung, Taiwan
- Other name: Queen of Hats
- Occupations: Singer, actress, presenter
- Years active: 1971–2010
- Spouse: Zhao Hongqi (m. 1980; died 2009)
- Children: Zhao Wen Lin (son)
- Musical career
- Genre: Hokkien pop Mandopop; Folk

Chinese name
- Traditional Chinese: 鳳飛飛
- Simplified Chinese: 凤飞飞
Transcriptions
Standard Mandarin
- Hanyu Pinyin: Fèng Fēifēi
Southern Min
- Hokkien POJ: Hōng Hui-hui
- Website: www.fongfeifei.com.tw

Fong Fei-Fei (Chinese: 鳳飛飛; pinyin: Fèng Fēifēi; Pe̍h-ōe-jī: Hōng Hui-hui), born Lim Chiu-Luan (Chinese: 林秋鸞; pinyin: Lín Qiūluán; Pe̍h-ōe-jī: Lîm Chhiu-loân; 20 August 1953 – 3 January 2012), was a Taiwanese singer, host and actress. As one of the biggest pop singers in Taiwan, she was known for her melodic love songs, unique personal stage style and broad vocal range.

In a 40-year career, Fong released more than 80 albums, sang over 100 movie theme songs and starred in several films and television variety shows. She is remembered for her songs like "Wish You Happiness," "I am a Cloud," and "The Wild Goose on the Wing." Fong died on 3 January 2012 of lung cancer in Kowloon City, Hong Kong, aged 58.

== Background ==
Fong Fei Fei was born as Lim Chiu-luan on 20 August 1953 and grew up in Daxi, Taoyuan County (now Daxi District, Taoyuan City), Taiwan. She had two elder brothers Lim Yu-Nung and Lim Hung-Ming. Her younger brother Kempis Lim (Chinese: 林鴻棠; Pe̍h-ōe-jī: Lîm Hông-tông; 1957–2006) was also a singer under the stage name of Fong Fei-yang (Chinese: 鳳飛颺; Pe̍h-ōe-jī: Hōng Hui-iông).

Fong began her career in 1968, after winning a singing contest at age 15. Her first major breakthrough came in 1971, when one of her songs was included on a compilation album. She released her first album "Wishing You Well" the next year. Her next major break came in 1974 in Singapore, where she was crowned one of the "top ten Southeast Asian Singers." She married in 1980 and continued her musical career until 2011 when Fong fell ill after she was diagnosed with lung cancer. Fong was often referred to as the "Queen of Hats" due to her signature headwear choices.

== Personal life ==
Fong married Hong Kong businessman Zhao Hongqi in 1980, they later had a son Zhao Wen Lin in February 1989. Her husband died of lung cancer at the age of 70 in 2009.

== Death ==
Fong spent the last ten years of her life living in Hong Kong. On 3 January 2012, Fong died at the age of 58 from lung cancer in St. Teresa's Hospital at Kowloon City, but the news was only reported on 13 February 2012 after Chinese New Year by her attorney per her request to keep her illness and death out of the press until all of her funeral arrangements were settled. Her remains were stored next to her husband's at Fo Guang Shan Bao Ta Temple.

== Legacy ==
In recognition of her contribution to Taiwan's music industry, she was bestowed with the Special Contribution Award during the Golden Melody Awards ceremony in 2013. Nation's cultural minister Lung Ying-tai called her "Taiwan's national singer". A Google Doodle featuring Fong Fei-fei was released on 20 August 2019, the singer's 66th birthday.
