= List of Taiwanese submissions for the Academy Award for Best International Feature Film =

Best International Feature Film submissions from Taiwan

Highlights
- Debut: 1957
- Submissions: 52
- Nominations: 3
- Oscar winners: 1

Taiwan (Republic of China) has submitted films for the Academy Award for Best International Feature Film (Note: The category was previously named the Academy Award for Best Foreign Language Film, but this was changed to the Academy Award for Best International Feature Film in April 2019, after the Academy deemed the word "Foreign" to be outdated.) since 1957. The award is handed out annually by the United States Academy of Motion Picture Arts and Sciences to a feature-length motion picture produced outside the United States that contains primarily non-English dialogue. It was not created until the 1956 Academy Awards, in which a competitive Academy Award of Merit, known as the Best Foreign Language Film Award, was created for non-English speaking films, and has been given annually since.

For the purposes of Oscar submissions, AMPAS recognizes China, Taiwan and Hong Kong as separate entities, and each one regularly submits a film to the competition. Taiwan became the first of the three ethnic Chinese entities to enter the competition in 1957.

As of 2026, Taiwan has been nominated three times, and won once for Crouching Tiger, Hidden Dragon, (2000).

== Submissions ==
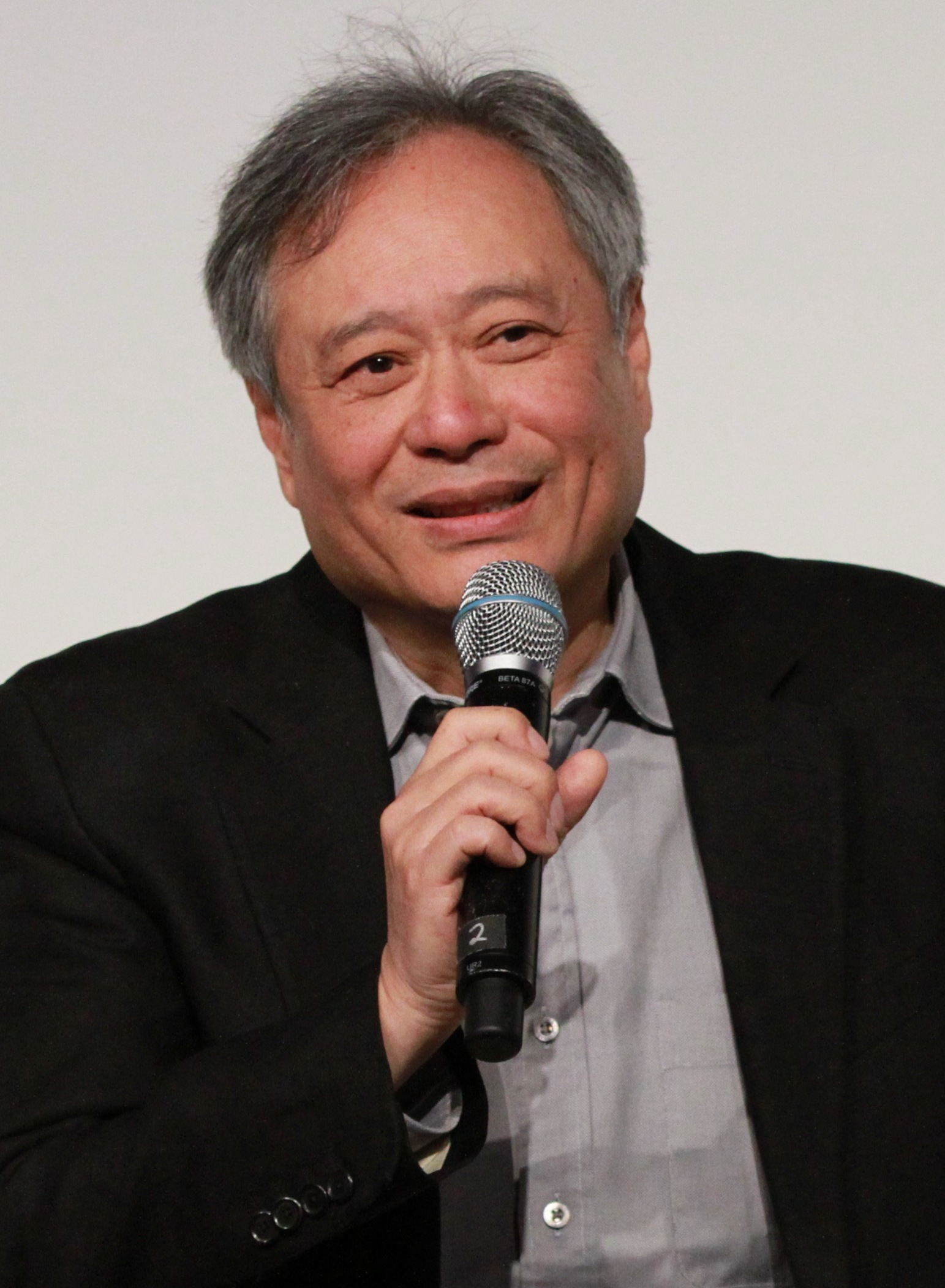
Ang Lee won for Crouching Tiger, Hidden Dragon in 2000.

The Academy of Motion Picture Arts and Sciences has invited the film industries of various countries to submit their best film for the Academy Award for Best International Feature Film since 1956. The International Feature Film Committee oversees the process and reviews all the submitted films. Following this, they vote via secret ballot to determine the five nominees for the award.

Taiwanese filmmaker Ang Lee had three films submitted, and all of them were nominated: The Wedding Banquet, Eat Drink Man Woman, and Crouching Tiger, Hidden Dragon. The latter won the award in 2000, and was also nominated in other nine categories, including Best Picture.

In 2007, the country had initially selected Ang Lee's Lust, Caution, but AMPAS did not accept the film stating that it was not a majority-Taiwanese production. The film had won the Golden Lion at the Venice Film Festival and was seen as an early favorite in the category. The film was also not selected by China.

Filmmakers Chen Kunhou and Hou Hsiao-hsien were also selected in three occasions to represent Taiwan, but neither of them received nominations.

Wei Te-sheng's Warriors of the Rainbow: Seediq Bale (2011), Chung Mong-hong's A Sun (2020), and Shih-Ching Tsou's Left-Handed Girl (2025), advanced to the December shortlists, but were not nominated.

Most of the submitted films are primary in Mandarin, Cantonese, or Taiwanese Hokkien. Below is a list of the films that have been submitted by Taiwan for review by the academy for the award by year and the respective Academy Awards ceremony.

Year (Ceremony)	Film title used in nomination	Original Title	Language(s)	Director(s)	Result
1957 (30th)	Amina	阿美娜	Mandarin	Yuan Congmei	Not nominated
1964 (37th)	Lovers' Rock	情人石	Mandarin	Pan Lei	Not nominated
1966 (39th)	The Silent Wife	啞女情深	Mandarin	Lee Hsing	Not nominated
1972 (45th)	Execution in Autumn	秋決	Mandarin	Lee Hsing	Not nominated
1976 (49th)	Eight Hundred Heroes	八百壯士	Mandarin	Ting Shan-hsi	Not nominated
1980 (53rd)	The Legend of the Six Dynasty	六朝怪談	Mandarin	Wong Guk-gam	Not nominated
1981 (54th)	If I Were for Real	假如我是真的	Mandarin	Wang Toon	Not nominated
1982 (55th)	The Battle for the Republic of China	辛亥雙十	Mandarin	Ting Shan-hsi	Not nominated
1983 (56th)	Growing Up	小畢的故事	Mandarin	Chen Kunhou	Not nominated
1984 (55th)	Old Mao's Second Spring	老莫的第二個春天	Mandarin	Lee You-ning	Not nominated
1985 (58th)	Kuei-Mei, a Woman	我這樣過了一生	Mandarin	Chang Yi	Not nominated
1986 (59th)	The Heroic Pioneers	唐山過台灣	Mandarin	Lee Shing	Not nominated
1987 (60th)	Osmanthus Alley	桂花巷	Mandarin	Chen Kunhou	Not nominated
1988 (61st)	My Mother's Teahouse	春秋茶室	Mandarin	Chen Kunhou	Not nominated
1989 (62nd)	A City of Sadness	悲情城市	Mandarin	Hou Hsiao-hsien	Not nominated
1990 (63rd)	Song of the Exile	客途秋恨	Cantonese, Japanese, Mandarin, English	Ann Hui	Not nominated
1991 (64th)	A Brighter Summer Day	牯嶺街少年殺人事件	Mandarin, Shanghainese, Taiwanese Hokkien	Edward Yang	Not nominated
1992 (65th)	Secret Love for the Peach Blossom Spring	暗戀桃花源	Mandarin	Stan Lai	Not nominated
1993 (66th)	The Wedding Banquet	喜宴	Mandarin, English	Ang Lee	Nominated
1994 (67th)	Eat Drink Man Woman	飲食男女	Mandarin, Taiwanese Hokkien, Japanese, Cantonese, Shanghainese	Ang Lee	Nominated
1995 (68th)	Super Citizen Ko	超級大國民	Taiwanese Hokkien, Mandarin	Wan Jen	Not nominated
1996 (69th)	Tonight Nobody Goes Home	今天不回家	Mandarin	Sylvia Chang	Not nominated
1997 (70th)	Yours and Mine	我的神經病	Mandarin, Taiwanese Hokkien, English	Wang Siu-di	Not nominated
1998 (71st)	Flowers of Shanghai	海上花	Cantonese, Shanghainese	Hou Hsiao-hsien	Not nominated
1999 (72nd)	March of Happiness	天馬茶房	Taiwanese Hokkien, Japanese, Mandarin, Shanghainese	Lin Cheng-sheng	Not nominated
2000 (73rd)	Crouching Tiger, Hidden Dragon	臥虎藏龍	Mandarin	Ang Lee	Won Academy Award
2001 (74th)	The Cabbie	運轉手之戀	Mandarin, Taiwanese Hokkien	Chen Yiwen, Huakun Zhang	Not nominated
2002 (75th)	The Best of Times	美麗時光	Mandarin, Hakka, Taiwanese Hokkien	Chang Tso-chi	Not nominated
2003 (76th)	Goodbye, Dragon Inn	不散	Mandarin, Taiwanese Hokkien	Tsai Ming-Liang	Not nominated
2004 (77th)	20 30 40		Mandarin	Sylvia Chang	Not nominated
2005 (78th)	The Wayward Cloud	天邊一朵雲	Mandarin	Tsai Ming-Liang	Not nominated
2006 (79th)	Blue Cha Cha	深海	Mandarin	Chen Wen-Tang	Not nominated
2007 (80th)	Island Etude	練習曲	Mandarin, Taiwanese Hokkien, English, Lithuanian	Chen Hwai-en	Not nominated
2008 (81st)	Cape No. 7	海角七號	Taiwanese Hokkien, Mandarin, Japanese	Wei Te-sheng	Not nominated
2009 (82nd)	Cannot Live Without You	不能沒有你	Hakka, Taiwanese Hokkien, Mandarin	Leon Dai	Not nominated
2010 (83rd)	Monga	艋舺	Taiwanese Hokkien, Mandarin	Doze Niu	Not nominated
2011 (84th)	Warriors of the Rainbow: Seediq Bale	賽德克‧巴萊	Seediq, Japanese, Taiwanese Hokkien	Wei Te-sheng	Made shortlist
2012 (85th)	Touch of the Light	逆光飛翔	Mandarin	Chang Rong-ji	Not nominated
2013 (86th)	Soul	失魂	Mandarin	Chung Mong-Hong	Not nominated
2014 (87th)	Ice Poison	冰毒	Southwestern Mandarin, Burmese	Midi Z	Not nominated
2015 (88th)	The Assassin	刺客聶隱娘	Mandarin	Hou Hsiao-hsien	Not nominated
2016 (89th)	Hang in There, Kids!	只要我長大	Mandarin, Atayal	Laha Mebow	Not nominated
2017 (90th)	Small Talk	日常對話	Taiwanese Hokkien	Huang Hui-chen	Not nominated
2018 (91st)	The Great Buddha+	大佛普拉斯	Taiwanese Hokkien, Mandarin, English	Huang Hsin-yao	Not nominated
2019 (92nd)	Dear Ex	誰先愛上他的	Mandarin	Mag Hsu and Hsu Chih-yen	Not nominated
2020 (93rd)	A Sun	陽光普照	Mandarin	Chung Mong-hong	Made shortlist
2021 (94th)	The Falls	瀑布	Mandarin	Chung Mong-hong	Not nominated
2022 (95th)	Goddamned Asura	該死的阿修羅	Mandarin	Lou Yi-an	Not nominated
2023 (96th)	Marry My Dead Body	關於我和鬼變成家人的那件事	Mandarin, Taiwanese Hokkien	Cheng Wei-hao	Not nominated
2024 (97th)	Old Fox	老狐狸	Mandarin, Taiwanese Hokkien	Hsiao Ya-chuan	Not nominated
2025 (98th)	Left-Handed Girl	左撇子女孩	Mandarin, Taiwanese Hokkien	Shih-Ching Tsou	Made shortlist
2026 (99th)	A Foggy Tale	大濛	Mandarin, Taiwanese Hokkien	Chen Yu-hsun	Pending

== See also ==
- Cinema of Taiwan
- List of Taiwanese films
- List of Academy Award-winning foreign language films
- List of Academy Award winners and nominees for Best International Feature Film
- List of Chinese submissions for the Academy Award for Best International Feature Film
- List of Hong Kong submissions for the Academy Award for Best International Feature Film
