= My Mother's Teahouse =

1988 film

- Film poster
- Directed by: Chen Kun-hou
- Written by: Ding Yah-Ming
- Produced by: Hsu Shu
- Starring: Sylvia Chang; Tony Leung Ka Fai; Yang Chieh-mei
- Cinematography: Chen Kun-hou
- Edited by: Liao Ching-sung
- Music by: Chen Yang
- Production companies: Long Shong Entertainment Multimedia Company; Maverick Films
- Release date: 1 April 1988 (Taiwan)
- Running time: 93 minutes
- Country: Taiwan
- Language: Mandarin

My Mother's Teahouse (pinyin: Chun qiu cha shi) is a 1988 Taiwanese drama film directed by Chen Kunhou. The film was selected as the Taiwanese entry for the Best Foreign Language Film at the 61st Academy Awards, but was not accepted as a nominee.

== Cast ==
- Sylvia Chang
- Tony Leung Ka Fai
- Yang Chieh-mei

== See also ==
- List of submissions to the 61st Academy Awards for Best Foreign Language Film
- List of Taiwanese submissions for the Academy Award for Best Foreign Language Film
