= My Native Land =

My Native Land may refer to:

- "My Native Land" (poem), written by Dashdorjiin Natsagdorj (1906–1937)
- My Native Land (film), 1980
