= Wan Jen =

Taiwanese film director

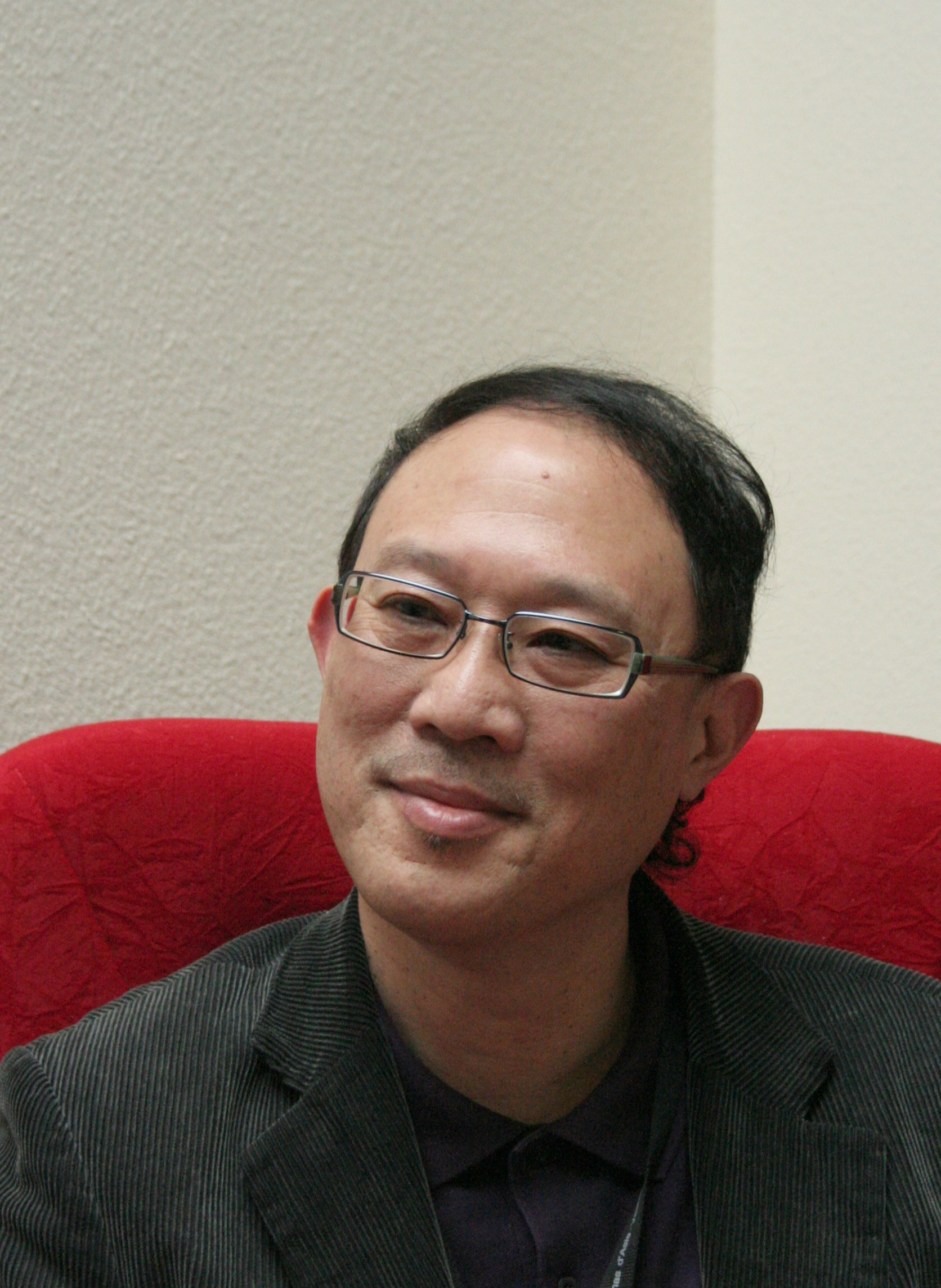
- Jen at Festival international des cinémas d'Asie 2010
- Born: 1950 (age 74–75); Taipei, Taiwan
- Spouse: Su Ming-Ming 蘇明明 (1996-present)
- Children: son Wan Yongli 萬永立
- Awards: Crystal Simorgh: Best Screenplay, Super Citizen Ko (1995); Silver Screen Awards: Special Jury Prize FIPRESCI/NETPAC Award, Connection by Fate

Chinese name
- Traditional Chinese: 萬仁
- Simplified Chinese: 万仁
Transcriptions
Standard Mandarin
- Hanyu Pinyin: Wàn Rén

Wan Jen (Chinese: 萬仁; pinyin: Wàn Rén) (born 1950, Taipei) is a Taiwanese filmmaker. He is a member of Taiwan's New Wave cinema movement of the 1980s.

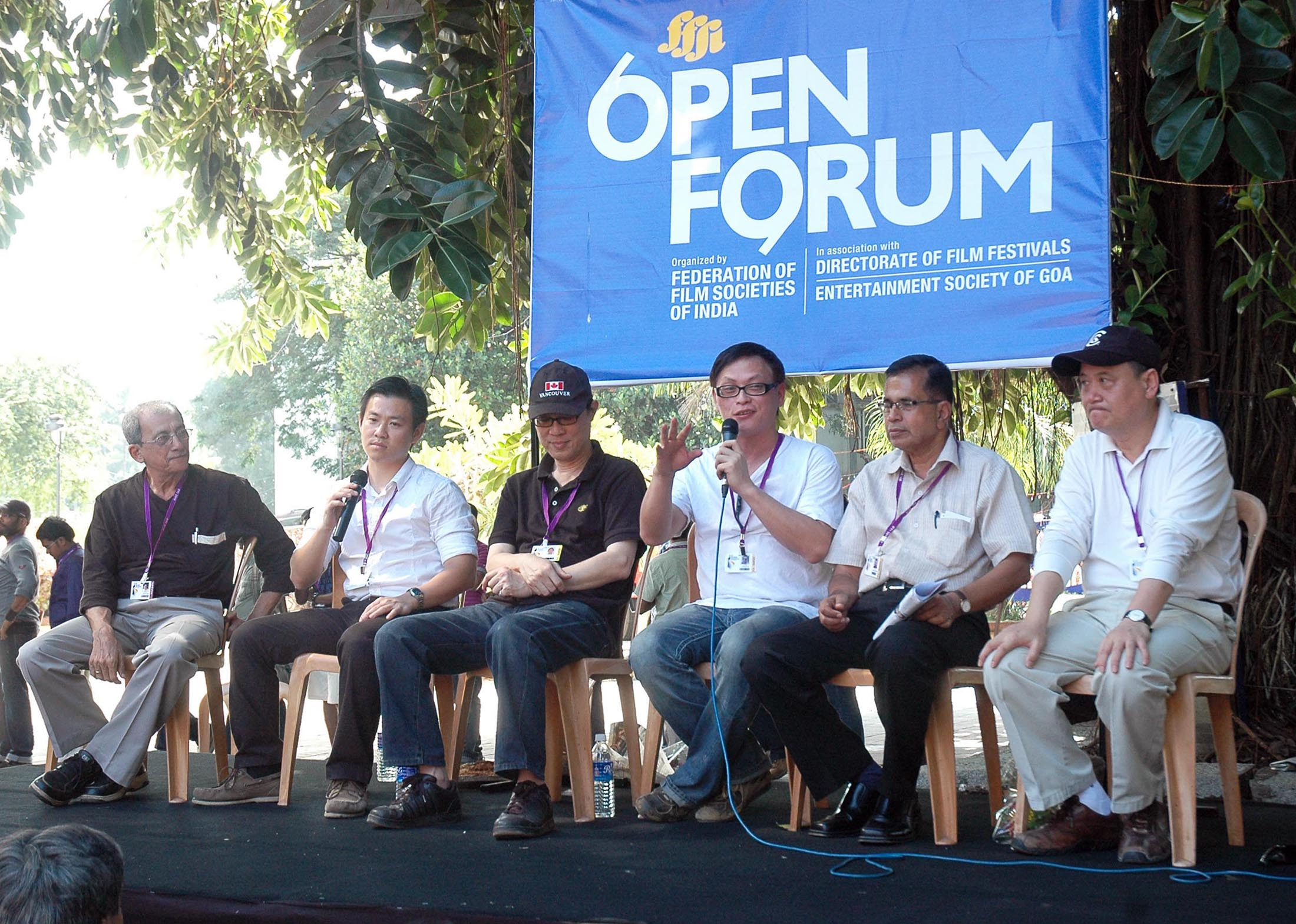
Jen at IFFI 2010

== Biography ==
After graduating foreign languages department at Soochow University, he moved to USA, where he received MA in Film from Columbia College in California. While in America, he managed to create two well-received short films. In the early 80s he came back to Taiwan. In 1983 he was invited to direct one of the segments in an omnibus film The Sandwich Man. His episode is entitled The Taste of Apple (蘋果的滋味). The two other parts were directed by Hou Hsiao-hsien and Zeng Chuang-hsiang. This movie, together with another anthology film - In Our Time (1982) - is considered a landmark in the emergence of the so-called Taiwanese New Wave. Among his other films, the most significant are Ah Fei (1984), Super Citizen Ko (1995) and Connection by Fate (1998).

Wan Jen focuses mainly on issues concerning Taiwanese society - both historical and current ones. His works are valued for their political and social criticism. In 1996, the Chinese Writer's & Artist's Association awarded him the Chinese Arts Medal for his achievements in the field of film. His wife, Su Ming-Ming, is an actress.

== Filmography (as director) ==
Year	English Title	Original Title	Notes
1979	Morning Dream	晨夢	short film shot on 16-mm
1981	Perplexed	迷惘	short film shot on 16-mm
1983	The Taste of Apple	蘋果的滋味	segment in The Sandwich Man
1983	Ah Fei	油麻菜籽	
1985	Super Citizen	超級市民	
1987	The Farewell Coast	惜別海岸	
1991	The Story of Taipei Women	胭脂	
1995	Super Citizen Ko	超級大國民	
1998	Connection by Fate	超級公民	
2001	Puppet Angel	傀儡天使	Never officially released, other title Sacrificial Victims 大選民, possibly co-directed with Liao Ching-sung
2004	Dana Sakura: Wushe Incident	風中緋櫻: 霧社事件	PTS 20-episode TV series
2007	The War of Betrayal 1895	亂世豪門	PTS 20-episode TV series
2013	It Takes Two to Tango	車拼	

== Sources ==
- Daw-Ming Lee. "Chin, Han". Historical Dictionary of Taiwan Cinema. (2013), pp. 387–389. ISBN 978-0-8108-6792-5.
- Zhang, Yingjin & Xiao, Zhiwei. "Wan Jen" in Encyclopedia of Chinese Film. Taylor & Francis (1998), p. 351. ISBN 0-415-15168-6.
