= Yen Cheng-kuo =

Taiwanese actor and director (1974–2025)

- Born: October 10, 1974
- Died: October 7, 2025 (aged 50)

Yen Cheng-kuo (Chinese: 顏正國; October 10, 1974 – October 7, 2025) was a Taiwanese actor, director and calligraphy teacher.

== Early life and career ==
Yen was born October 10, 1974 in Xizhi, Taipei County. His father was a soldier in the Republic of China Army. He entered the film industry at the age of six, debuting in My Native Land (1980), directed by Li Hsing.

Throughout his career, he acted in a number of feature films directed or executive produced by Hou Hsiao-hsien, including Growing Up (1983), A Summer at Grandpa's (1984), and Dust of Angels (1992). He was nominated for the Golden Horse Award for Best Child Star in 1983, for his role in The Sandwich Man.

== Personal life and death ==
In the late 1980s, Yen became addicted to drugs and was arrested in 1991 for using amphetamines, causing public uproar. He was also arrested for possessing a firearm.

On July 1, 2001, Yen and a group of other people kidnapped Shi Jindu, a drug dealer in Dacun, Changhua County, and extorted NT$200 and 2 kilograms of amphetamine. He was released from Taichung Prison in March 2012 after serving 11 years.

In later life, he worked as a calligraphy teacher and published a book, Giving Up Fists and Painting a New Life through Calligraphy — Kung Fu Kid Yen Cheng-kuo's Youth and Awakening.

Yen died at the age of 50 of lung cancer on October 7, 2025, while hospitalized at Far Eastern Memorial Hospital.
