= The Boys from Fengkuei =

- Film poster
- Traditional Chinese: 風櫃來的人
- Simplified Chinese: 风柜来的人
- Literal meaning: People who come from Fengkuei
- Hanyu Pinyin: Fēngguì lái de rén
- Directed by: Hou Hsiao-hsien
- Written by: Chu Tʽien-wen
- Produced by: Chen Kun-hou; Chang Hua-Kun
- Starring: Doze Niu; Hsiu-Ling Lin; Tou Chung-hua; Chang Shih; Chao Peng-chue
- Cinematography: Chen Kun-hou
- Edited by: Liao Ching-sung
- Music by: Jonathan Lee; Su Lai
- Production company: Evergreen Film Company
- Release date: July 13, 1983 (Taiwan)
- Running time: 102 minutes
- Country: Taiwan
- Languages: Mandarin; Taiwanese Minnan

The Boys from Fengkuei (Chinese: 風櫃來的人), also known as All the Youthful Days, is a 1983 Taiwanese drama film directed by Hou Hsiao-hsien. The movie is about a group of impulsive teenagers with nothing to do and high energy. While waiting to be enlisted in the army, they cause trouble in their hometown, Fengkuei, and run away from Penghu to Kaohsiung. From a small town to a big city, through the depression and turmoil of youth they experience unforgettable life scenery and gradually recede from their original youthfulness. It was Hou Hsiao-hsien's first art film after he directed three light comedies in the early eighties and a representative work of the Taiwan New Cinema at its inception.

== Plot ==
Ah-ching, whose father is disabled due to a brain injury, fools around with his friends Ah-rong, Kuo-zai, and Ah-yu in their island fishing village, Fengkuei (風櫃). One day, they get into trouble with the local gangsters, and Ah-ching smashes one's head with a brick, causing the police to look for Ah-ching. They go to Kuo-zai's uncle's house on the sea shore in Neipo (內坡) to hide and have a good time, but they are eventually brought to the police station for their crimes. Bailed out by his brother, Ah-ching does not want to stay in Fengkuei any more. He steals some money from home and goes to the port city of Kaohsiung together with Ah-rong and Kuo-zai to look for work.

With the help of Ah-rong's sister, they rent a room on the island of Cijin. The industrial city of Kaohsiung is vibrant but full of traps. Thanks to Huang Jin-he, a friend of Ah-rong's sister who lives in the same building across from their room, Ah-ching and Kuo-zai successfully get jobs at the electronics processing factory. Ah-ching soon develops a crush on Jin-he's girlfriend, Hsiao-hsing.

One day Ah-rong's sister gives them money to have fun in Kaohsiung. They get scammed and are tricked into going up an empty building to watch a porn film, but instead find that there is only the landscape of Kaohsiung to see. The view prompts Ah-ching to start working hard by learning Japanese. Meanwhile, Ah-rong gets involved with a group of hoodlums. Jin-he is fired because the factory finds out that he had been stealing factory materials. Jin-he decides to take a seaman's job and go seafaring.

Ah-ching is worried about Hsiao-hsing, who is sad after breaking up with Jin-he. In his heaving mood, Ah-ching starts to have friction with Ah-rong and even pushes him into the sea. Ah-ching receives news of his father's death and returns to Penghu to attend the funeral. Hsiao-hsing also comes along to Fengkuei to visit Jin-he's family.

Back in Kaohsiung, Ah-rong sets up a stall in the market to sell pirated compact audio cassettes. Hsiao-hsing receives a letter from Jin-he saying that their ship broke down in Japan, so the company is sending the seamen back first. The next day, Hsiao-hsing tells Ah-ching that she is going to Taipei to join her sister and does not want to see Jin-he again. Ah-ching accompanies her to the bus station to see her off.

Depressed, Ah-ching goes to Ah-rong's stall in the market. Ah-rong asks him to brighten up because Kuo-zai was drafted and has to leave for Fengkuei the next day and report to the army the day afterwards. The news and the words "military service" written on the sale board give Ah-ching a shakeup. He jumps up on a chair and begins to shout "Military service big sale! Three for 50 bucks!" When Ah-rong tries to stop him because the price is too lower to make a profit, Ah-ching tells him not to have any reservations because "Kuo-zai is going to do military service in two days! Let's just do it!"

== Cast ==
Actor/Actress	Character	Notes
Doze Niu	Ah-ching	
Chang Shih	Ah-rong	
Chao Peng-chue	Kuo-zai	It is pronounced in Taiwanese in the film as “Kuei-e.”
Lin Hsiu-ling	Hsiao-hsing	Huang Jin-he’s girlfriend
Chen Shu-fang	Ah-ching’s mother	
Jang Chuen-fang	Ah-rong’s sister	
Tuo Tsung-hua	Huang Jin-he	
Hou Hsiao-hsien	Ah-rong’s sister's boyfriend	Hou Hsiao-hsien is also the director of the film
Yang Li-yin	Yang Jin-hua	

== Production ==
Thanks to screenwriter Chu Tʽien-wen's recommendation, Hou Hsiao-hsien took inspiration from Shen Congwen's (沈從文) autobiography to keep a longer distance from the subjects in the film in order to have a broader view. The film is an important milestone in Hou Hsiao-hsien's film career as director. It establishes the realistic cinematic style of long shots and long takes, which set the tone for the Taiwan New Wave film movement that followed. During the editing stage, Hou Hsiao-hsien once fell into writer's block and did not know how to cut the film with Liao Ching-sung. After watching Jean-Luc Godard's À bout de souffle, he realized that he could be free about the narrative as long as the feel is right.

This soundtrack of the film was originally a namesake song in rock-n-roll style composed and sung by popular singer Jonathan Lee. Edward Yang suggested to Hou Hsiao-hsien that he redo the soundtrack by replacing the song with the Concerto No. 4 in F minor, L'inverno, from Vivaldi's violin concerto Le quattro stagioni. The classical music creates a sense of detachment corresponding to the distanced viewpoint Hou wanted.

Jang Chuen-fang (張純芳), who played Ah rong's sister, starred in many films of Taiwan New Wave Cinema, including Growing Up directed by Chen Kun-hou, Nature is Quietly Beautiful (霧裡的笛聲) directed by Tseng Chuang-hsiang, and Old Mao's Second Spring directed by You-Ning Li (李祐寧). She was one of the most important actresses of the Taiwan New Cinema era in the 1980s.

Hou Hsiao-hsien plays the role of Ah-rong's sister's boyfriend in this film. He also dubbed the voice of the peddler on the motorbike who tricked Ah-ching and his friends to go up the building for the porn film.

The Korean film Peppermint Candy by Lee Chang-dong was inspired by this film.

The film was digitally restored in 2015 by Cinematek (the Royal Film Archive of Belgium) in collaboration with Hou Hsiao-hsien and The Film Foundation's World Cinema Project. The 4K restored version premiered at the 72nd Venice International Film Festival in 2015.

== Awards ==
The film won the Golden Montgolfiere at the 1984 Nantes Three Continents Festival.

Awards	Category	Recipient(s)	Result
21st Golden Horse Awards	Best Narrative Feature	Wan Nian Qing Film Company	Nominated
21st Golden Horse Awards	Best Director	Hou Hsiao-hsien	Nominated
21st Golden Horse Awards	Best Film Editing	Liao Ching-sung	Nominated
21st Golden Horse Awards	Best Cinematography	Chen Kun-hou	Nominated
