= Taiwan New Cinema =

Film movement in Taiwan, 1982 to 1987

Taiwan New Cinema (also known as New Taiwanese Cinema or the Taiwan New Wave) was a film reform movement initiated by young Taiwanese filmmakers and directors which took place from 1982 to 1987. Taiwan New Cinema films primarily showcase a realistic style with their depictions of subject matter close to the social reality, offering a retrospective look into the lives of the common people. Taiwan New Cinema brought about a new chapter for the cinema of Taiwan with its innovative form and unique style.

== History ==
=== Before Taiwan New Cinema ===
==== Political propaganda (1945–1960) ====
On August 15, 1945, Taiwan was liberated from Japanese rule after Japan unconditionally surrendered. The Republic of China's Nationalist government took over Taiwan and abolished the Japanization implemented by the Japanese rule, including the Japanization of spoken languages in Taiwan. The Nationalist government started the promotion of Mandarin. In 1949, the Chinese Civil War between the Nationalist Party (Kuomintang) and the Chinese Communist Party (CCP) ended with the CCP taking control of mainland China, while the Nationalist Kuomintang Party retreated to Taiwan.

In the 1950s, to comply with the government's political agenda, the three major state-owned film studios (Taiwan Film Culture Co., the China Motion Picture Studio, and the Agricultural Education Film Studio) underwent structural reform. Subsequently, through the restrictions imposed by censorship and ideological regulation, the government fully managed and controlled the film industry. During this period, Taiwanese films largely aligned with the anti-communist and anti-Soviet political ideology and became tools for political propaganda, resulting in mediocre content. Under the special circumstances of the Chinese Civil War and the Cold War between the United States and the Soviet Union, Taiwanese audiences, amidst a gloomy situation, found resonance in local film culture, leading to the rise of Taiyupian (Taiwanese-language cinema).

==== Innovative productions (1960–1978) ====
In the 1960s, the situation across the Taiwan Strait gradually stabilized, and the overall social atmosphere became slightly more relaxed. With the U.S. military presence in Taiwan, Taiwan began to experience stable development. In March 1963, Kung Hong, the newly appointed president at the Central Motion Picture Corporation, proposed a film production style called healthy realism that, while adopting the filmmaking style of realistic films in Europe and the United States, avoided exposing the dark side of society. Surprisingly, the approach of concealing the bad while promoting the good and of advocating humanitarianism were well-received in the Taiwanese market. This innovation not only elevated the production standards of Taiwanese films but also opened up the overseas Chinese market for films.

In addition, many films adapted from the novels of Taiwanese writer Chiung Yao introduced extensively emerging thematic elements of romance and melancholy, and hence expanded the horizons of Taiwanese cinema. During this period, Mandarin-language films flourished, overshadowing and gradually leading to the decline of the Taiyupian market.

In the 1970s, under the leadership of Chiang Ching-kuo, who was serving as the Premier of the Executive Yuan at the time, Taiwan embarked on the Ten Major Construction Projects to accelerate economic development. As a result, Taiwanese society transitioned from an agrarian society to an industrial one, and the majority of Taiwanese people became more affluent. Films at the time started responding to societal demands with the production of patriotic films, romance films, martial arts films, kung fu films, and comedy films, all of which became the mainstream media providing entertainment for the public.

However, these films eventually faced rejection from audiences due to their repetitive nature and adherence to established conventions. The influx of American and Hong Kong films into the Taiwanese market further exacerbated the decline of Taiwanese cinema.

==== Cinematic reform (1978–1982) ====
In June 1978, Ming Ji, the president of Central Motion Picture Corporation, revisited film production trends and guidelines and set goals to "strengthen policy propaganda and promote cooperation with both domestic and overseas filmmakers." In 1980, the Government Information Office of the Executive Yuan put in efforts to enhance the artistic and international dimensions of Taiwanese films. The Central Motion Picture Corporation was tasked with initiating a series of reforms, such as personnel reorganization. Hsiao Yeh was appointed as the Deputy Manager of the Production Planning Department and the Head of the Planning Team, and Wu Nien-jen, an emerging writer at the time, was hired for screenwriting.

Since then, Taiwanese cinema broke free from its previous creative style, with plots that are more closely related to the realities of society. Establishing new forms of cinematic style and language, it also began to cast non-celebrity or non-professional actors and to adopt a more natural and realistic filmmaking approach.

=== Taiwan New Cinema (1982–1987) ===
In 1982, three new-generation directors—Edward Yang, Ko I-chen, and Chang Yi—joined the Central Motion Picture Corporation and proposed a collaborative project of low-budget films. Through the efforts of Ming Ji and Hsiao Yeh, they produced the four-segment anthology film, In Our Time. This film marked the beginning of analyzing real social phenomena and caring about the realities of everyday life as well as the restoration of collective memory. For this reason, In Our Time has been widely regarded as the first work of the Taiwan New Cinema movement. All the filmmakers involved in this film became important members of the movement. The naturalistic and literary style of In Our Time symbolized the difference between New Cinema and Old Cinema.

Subsequently, emerging Taiwanese directors, such as Chen Kun-hou, Hou Hsiao-Hsien, Wan Jen, and Wang Toon, began producing realistic works that resonated with the cinematic movement, sparking a trend of realistic filmmaking. At the time, art films that emphasized the seriousness and scholarly significance of cinema had also gradually made their way into Taiwan, even though the ideas that came with these art films might not necessarily coincide with the notion of audience-oriented film promoted by the Film Critics China.

In 1983, the three-segment anthology film The Sandwich Man, directed by the new-generation directors, sparked a wave of criticism due to an attempt to censor depictions of poverty, known as the "Apple-Paring Incident", that happened prior to the film's release. This event was widely seen as an ideological struggle between the New Cinema and the Old Cinema, as well as between the new-generation directors and the Film Critics China. The former brought the controversy into the public sphere to seek arbitration, while the latter used anonymous letters to make accusations and express doubts. Ultimately, as the film managed to escape censorship and kept its creative concept intact, The Sandwich Man established the theme and direction for the Taiwan New Cinema.

However, due to the immaturity of a few incompetent individuals, some films exhibited excessive self-indulgent sentimentality. As a result, the quality of New Cinema varied, and it gradually lost its appeal at the box office. The New Cinema films focused on art cinema, while Hong Kong and Hollywood films prioritized commercial productions, leading to a growing divide between the critics and supporters of each side. Supporters expressed their unwillingness to stifle the progress of New Cinema, while critics engaged in forceful criticism of the movement. After numerous debates, the new-generation directors became increasingly dissatisfied with the Film Critics China. However, despite facing severe criticism and poor box office performance in the Taiwanese market at the time, New Cinema, receiving numerous awards, gained international recognition at international film festivals and in the global art cinema circuit.

On November 6, 1986, Edward Yang delivered a speech entitled the "Taiwan Film Manifesto of the 76th Year of the Republic of China" at his 40th birthday party in his home in Taipei. In the speech, also known as "Another Cinema Manifesto," he strongly questioned the film policies as well as the mass media and film criticism system of that time. Yang's provocative statement was seen as proclaiming the death of the New Cinema movement. On January 24, 1987, the manifesto was published in the Literary Supplement of the China Times, as well as in Wenxing Monthly and the Hong Kong magazine Film Biweekly. Generally speaking, the "Taiwan Film Manifesto of the 76th Year of the Republic of China," drafted by fifty New Cinema filmmakers and cultural workers, can be seen as the end of the New Cinema movement and the beginning of a pursuit for "Another Cinema" in the subsequent years.

On July 15, 1987, the Nationalist government announced the lifting of the 38-year-long martial law and allowed its people to visit their families in the mainland, leading to a gradual easing of political relations between the two sides of the Taiwan Strait. Additionally, with the rise of the Tangwai movement, Taiwanese society gradually freed itself from oppression. In conjunction with the lifting of governmental restrictions on political party formation and press freedom, the overall atmosphere in society was no longer as serious as before.

==== Repercussions (1988–1996) ====
After the lifting of martial law, despite Taiwanese cinema's continuous struggle in the market, directors and screenwriters who emerged from the New Cinema movement had already begun to delve into previously taboo subjects, revisiting and exploring Taiwan's modern history and personal memories.

In 1989, Hou Hsiao-Hsien, a participant in the New Cinema movement, achieved international recognition with his film, A City of Sadness, winning the prestigious Golden Lion Award at the Venice Film Festival. This marked the first time a Taiwanese film had received recognition at one of the world's top three film festivals. The film depicts the prominent Lin family in the Jiufen area as they navigate through the periods of the Japanese rule, the end of World War II, the 228 Incident, and the White Terror, providing a nuanced reflection of Taiwan's modern history and garnering much praise. From then on, Taiwanese cinema achieved full artistic freedom in its choice of subjects and officially entered an era of diversity, free from ideological constraints.

== Contributions of Taiwan New Cinema ==
=== The meaning of Taiwan New Cinema ===
In 1998, the first Taipei Film Festival was officially organized by the Taipei Film Festival Executive Committee. Under the auspices of the organizing committee, the book Revisiting the Past: Tracing the Origins of Taiwanese Cinema (Chen Kuo-fu, 1998) was published. The book positioned the provenience of Taiwanese cinema with the film, The Sandwich Man, which marked the beginning of the Taiwan New Cinema movement. It argued that, prior to The Sandwich Man, no film had ever been referred to as Taiwanese cinema. The films before the Taiwan New Cinema movement were often understood as "an escapism from facing reality," embodying "the inner conflicts of people during the tense political atmosphere and social transition period across the Taiwan Strait." At that time, domestic films were often labeled with the stigma of escapism.

The entire book focused on the retrospective of The Sandwich Man, considering it as the starting point of the Taiwan New Cinema and even of Taiwanese cinema as a whole. It adopted a historical perspective centering on the New Cinema movement in its historiography of the film history of Taiwan. It extensively discussed and strongly criticized the Film Critics China that caused the Apple-Paring Incident at that time. Additionally, New Cinema director Wan Jen believed that the incident of his receiving anonymous blackmail was "a complete confrontation between the old and new forces".

=== Style of Taiwan New Cinema ===
- Close examination of the lives of Taiwanese people: It conveys introspection towards the living environment by providing memories distinct from the one-Chinese narrative, extensively using local Taiwanese literary writings, and consolidating a collective identity shared by the Taiwanese people.
- Analysis of real social phenomena: It becomes the voice for Taiwan's historical development by focusing on daily life, placing greater emphasis on personal experiences and memories, abandoning the previous approach of highlighting the good and concealing the bad, and analytically dissecting the pains experienced by people in each era.
- Employment of non-celebrity and non-professional actors: Its attention to Taiwan's local culture expresses a breakthrough by departing from the star system and extensively employing non-celebrity or non-professional actors in films to create characters that are closer to ordinary people and their experience.
- Establishment of a visual aesthetic style: It establishes key cinematic features incorporating both realist and modernist styles by breaking away from the outdated industrial filmmaking and narrative models, and creating a visual style with deep-focus cinematography and long-take aesthetics that is accompanied by concise storytelling methods.

=== Influence of Taiwan New Cinema ===
- Elevating the quality of Taiwanese films: It aligns Taiwanese cinema with world cinema and brings Taiwanese cinema into the top-tier international film festivals by indirectly excluding low-quality works with its emphasis on the concept of film as art.
- Breaking through the restrictions of subject matter: By extending the thematic scope to previously taboo topics, exploring controversial events and figures in Taiwan, and examining the changes in the social structure, Taiwan New Cinema achieves creative freedom beyond ideological constraints.

== Key films ==
Taiwan New Cinema
Year	Film title	Director	Note
1982	In Our Time	Edward Yang, Ko I-chen, Tao Te-chen, and Chang Yi	
1982	Green Green Grass of Home	Hou Hsiao-Hsien	
1983	Growing Up	Chen Kun-Hou	
1983	The Sandwich Man	Hou Hsiao-Hsien, Tseng Chuang-hsiang, and Wan Jen	Apple-Paring Incident
1983	A Flower in The Raining Night	Wong Toon	
1983	That Day, on the Beach	Edward Yang	
1983	The Boys from Fengkuei	Hou Hsiao-Hsien	
1983	Kendo Kids	Chang Yi	
1983	Kidnapped	Ko I-chen	
1984	Ah Fei	Wan Jen	
1984	Second Spring of Mr. Muo	You-Ning Lee	
1984	Jade Love	Chang Yi	
1984	A Summer at Grandpa's	Hou Hsiao-Hsien	
1984	Run Away	Wang Toon	
1984	Nature Is Quiet Beautiful	Tseng Chuang-hsiang	
1984	I Love Mary	Ko I-chen	
1985	Taipei Story	Edward Yang	
1985	A Time to Live, A Time to Die	Hou Hsiao-Hsien	
1985	Kuei-Mei, a Woman	Chang Yi	
1985	Super Citizen	Wan Jen	
1985	The Loser, the Hero	Peter Mak	
1985	The Butcher's Wife	Tseng Chuang-hsiang	
1986	Reunion	Ko I-chen	
1986	Dust in the Wind	Hou Hsiao-Hsien	Taiwan Film Manifesto of the 76th Year of the Republic of China
1986	Terrorizers	Edward Yang	
1987	Farewell to the Channel	Wan Jen	
1987	Daughter of the Nile	Hou Hsiao-Hsien	
1987	Osmanthus Alley	Chen Kun-Hou	
1987	Strawman	Wang Toon	
1988	The Last Autumn of Lao Ke	You-Ning Lee	
1989	A City of Sadness	Hou Hsiao-Hsien	
1989	Banana Paradise	Wang Toon	
1990	School Girl	Chen Kuo-fu	
1991	A Brighter Summer Day	Edward Yang	
1992	Hill of No Return	Wang Toon	
1993	The Puppetmaster	Hou Hsiao-Hsien	
1993	Treasure Island	Chen Kuo-fu	
1994	A Confucian Confusion	Edward Yang	
1994	A Borrowed Life	Wu Nien-jen	
1995	The Peony Pavilion	Chen Kuo-fu	
1995	Good Men, Good Women	Hou Hsiao-Hsien	
1995	Super Citizen Ko	Wan Jen	
1996	Mahjong	Edward Yang	
1996	Goodbye South, Goodbye	Hou Hsiao-Hsien	
1996	Buddha Bless America	Wu Nien-jen	
1997	Blue Moon	Ko I-chen	
1998	Flowers of Shanghai	Hou Hsiao-Hsien	
1998	The Personals	Chen Kuo-fu	
1998	Connection by Fate	Wan Jen	
2000	Yi Yi	Edward Yang	

== See also ==
- Cinema of Taiwan
- Taiyupian Taiwanese-language Cinema
