= The Sandwich Man (1983 film) =

- Poster of The Sandwich Man
- Chinese: 兒子的大玩偶
- Hanyu Pinyin: Er Zi De Da Wan Ou
- Directed by: Hou Hsiao-hsien; Wan Jen; Tseng Chuang-hsiang
- Screenplay by: Wu Nien-jen
- Story by: Huang Chun-ming
- Produced by: Wu Zhongling
- Starring: Chen Bor-jeng Yang Li-yin; Tsui Fu-sheng; Cho Sheng-li; Chiang Hsia Yen Cheng-kuo
- Cinematography: Chen Kun-hou
- Edited by: Liao Ching-sung
- Music by: Wen Longjun
- Release date: September 2, 1983
- Running time: 105 minutes
- Country: Taiwan
- Budget: $5,000,000

The Sandwich Man (Chinese: 兒子的大玩偶; pinyin: Erzi de da wan'ou) is a 1983 Taiwanese film. The film project was proposed and put into plan by Hsiao Yeh and Wu Nien-jen. It was directed by Hou Hsiao-hsien and two other then-new directors, Tsang Jong-cheung (曾壯祥) and Wan Jen. The script by Wu Nien-jen is based on three stories from Huang Chun-ming's short stories collection The Taste of Apples. The three stories together vividly portray the society of Taiwan during the Cold War period, when it underwent industrialization with help from the United States. The film is regarded as a hallmark at the beginning of Taiwanese New Cinema.

The title of the film is derived from the film's first namesake vignette, The Sandwich Man, also known as The Son's Big Doll. Directed by Hou Hsiao-hsien, it depicts the hardship of a young man who ekes out a bare living for his young family by putting on clown makeup and costume to be a walking movie advertisement board.

The second vignette, Vickie's Hat, is directed by Tsang Jong-cheung. It depicts a fresh young salesman's disillusionment with the fairytale of modernization, when one of the Japanese pressure cookers he tried to sell to villagers accidentally exploded during a demonstration and critically wounded his colleague.

The third vignette, The Taste of Apples, is directed by Wan Jen. It portrays the poverty of a family living in the ghetto of Taipei City by showing how they could stay in a clean place like an American Navy hospital and have a taste of an apple, only after the father was luckily hit by an American colonel's car.

== Plot ==
=== The Sandwich Man ===
The Sandwich Man is the first installment of this film. The story focuses on a young man, Kun Shu, who was married and had a baby son, who was under one-year old. His hard-working wife was pregnant again and they had to decide whether they could afford to keep the second child. Fortunately, Kun Shu got a job as a "sandwich man" to advertise for the film to be screened in cinema. It is a demanding job for he has to wear cumbersome clown costumes and paint a clown face every day and walk around the town under the scorching sun and endure the laughter of passers-by and even pranks. Kun Shu has no complaints since the job enabled them to at least welcome the second child. One day Kun Shu discovered the irony of the job and his life: his son only recognizes him when he is in his working costume, that is, the sandwich man.

=== Vicki's Hat ===
The second installment of the film, Vicki's Hat, portrays the story of two salesmen trying to sell imported Japanese pressure cookers to the villagers of Bu-dai in Jia-yi, a fishing village in central Taiwan. Wang Wuxiong took the shitty job because he needed to leave home while his colleague Lin Zai-fa was hoping to earn more bonus money for his pregnant wife. Wang had a good impression of Vicki, an elementary school girl who passed by the house they rented and always had her school hat on. Lin even joked about Wang's ten-year plan to wait for Vicki to be old enough to marry her. The sale had not been going well. Lin decided to use the pressure cooker to cook pork knuckles for demonstration. While Vicki volunteered to help, he was so curious about her always wearing her hat that he suddenly took it off her head and discovered the bald spot on her scalp she tried to hide. Vicki was shocked and shamefully ran away. In the meantime, Lin suffered a deep cut on his throat when the pressure cooker exploded during the demonstration. Seeing his wounded colleague fighting for his life in the hospital and knowing that his pregnant wife just sent a letter asking him to take a break to come home because she is worried about having a miscarriage, Wang cannot resist his anger and frustration but to tear the poster of the pressure cooker on the wall into pieces and throw them on the sea.

=== The Taste of Apple ===
Riding his bike to go to work early in the morning in Taipei City, Jiang Afa, a laborer who has five children including one dumb girl, was hit by a car driven by Colonel Gray, an officer of the U.S. Marine Corps stationed in Taiwan. As a result, he broke his legs and was admitted to the U.S. Naval Hospital in Tianmu, Taipei City for medical treatment. The accident, which should have been a huge impact on the poor family, turned out to be an unexpected blessing because Afa was fortunate enough to be hit by an American. When the wife and the five children were waiting in the lobby of the hospital, they were impressed by the clean and white environment they had never been in. Not only did the colonel take full responsibility and promised to cover all the medical expenses but also gave him 50 thousand NT dollars and offered to take the dumb girl to the US for better education. Afa's foreman who came to visit him was so envious he even asked him whether he deliberately caused the accident. When the family tasted the very expensive apples for the first time in their life they felt a sense of heavenly happiness.

== Cast ==
The Sandwich Man
Actor	Character	Notes
Chen Bor-jeng	Kun Shu	
Yang Li-yin	A Zhu	Kun Shu's wife
Zeng Guofeng	theater manager	
Lai Denan	A Shui Bo	Kun Shu's uncle
Hou Fuyue	A Long	Kun Shu's son

Vicki's Hat
Actor	Character	Notes
Tsui Fu-sheng	Vicki's dad	
Jin Ding	Wang Wuxiong	pressure cooker salesman
Fang Dingtai	Lin Zaifa	Wang Wuxiong's colleague
Zhang Yuzhi	Lin Vicki	
Chen Qi	Mei Li	Lin Zaifa's wife

The Taste of Apple
Actor	Character	Notes
Chiang Hsia	Mrs. Jiang	Jiang Afa's wife
Cho Sheng-li	Jiang Afa	
Yen Cheng-kuo	Jiang Aji	Jiang Afa's son
Su Zhixian	Jiang Asong	Jiang Afa's son
Wang Huijun	teacher	
Tan Yang	Tan Yang	
Bo Senlin	Grey	
He Tai	foreign affairs police	
Shi Anru	dumb	Jiang Afa's daughter
Jiang huiling	Jiang Atao	Jiang Afa's daughter

== Production ==
This movie is a low-budget film released by Central Pictures Corporation Co., Ltd, in 1983. It is presented as an anthology of three short films in order to reduce the cost when Taiwanese films cinema in the early 80s. Huang Chun-ming's novels depict the modernization of Taiwanese society, both in the use of language and in the description of vernacular scenes. The directors of The Sandwich Man have transformed the limitation of low budget (e.g., single-camera operation and non-professional actors) into a refreshingly new realistic style.

The Taste of Apple's realistic portrayal of the poverty of the illegal building cluster (currently No. 14 and No. 15 Park) in Taipei City was considered by conservative critics to be damaging to Taiwan's national image if screened in international festivals. They pressured the government and Central Pictures Corporation Company to cut away related scenes, which would destroy the film as a piece of art. Fortunately, Yang Shiqi (楊士琪), a reporter from the United Daily News, had the courage to condemn this censorship intent and successfully rallied the public's support to not only keep the film intact as director Wan Jen wanted it to be and also paved the way for later films of the Taiwan New Cinema to have greater creative freedom to realistically address social issues. The whole event has been referred to as the "apple-peeling incident" and The Sandwich Man acclaimed as the beginning of Taiwan's New Cinema in 1983.

== Awards ==
Awards	Category	Recipient(s)	Result	Ref.
20th Golden Horse Awards	Best Supporting Actor	Chen Bor-jeng	Nominated	
20th Golden Horse Awards	Best Adapted Screenplay	Wu Nien-jen	Nominated	
20th Golden Horse Awards	Best Child Actor	Yen Cheng-kuo	Nominated	
