= A Brighter Summer Day =

1991 Taiwanese epic coming-of-age period crime drama film by Edward Yang

- Theatrical poster
- Traditional Chinese: 牯嶺街少年殺人事件
- Simplified Chinese: 牯岭街少年杀人事件
- Literal meaning: Youth Homicide Incident On Guling Street
- Hanyu Pinyin: Gǔlǐng Jiē Shàonián Shārén Shìjiàn
- Directed by: Edward Yang
- Screenplay by: Hung Hung; Lai Ming-tang; Edward Yang; Alex Yang
- Produced by: Yu Wei-yen; Chan Hung-tze; Edward Yang
- Starring: Chang Chen; Lisa Yang; Chang Kuo-Chu; Elaine Jin
- Cinematography: Chang Hui-kung
- Edited by: Chen Bo-wen
- Music by: Zhang Hongda
- Production companies: Yang & His Gang Filmmakers; Jane Balfour Films
- Distributed by: Cine Qua Non Films
- Release date: July 27, 1991
- Running time: 237 minutes
- Country: Taiwan
- Languages: Mandarin; Shanghainese; Taiwanese

A Brighter Summer Day is a 1991 Taiwanese epic crime drama film directed by Edward Yang, associated with the New Taiwanese Cinema. Its English title is derived from the lyrics of Elvis Presley's 1960 rendition of "Are You Lonesome Tonight?". Set in the late 1950s and early '60s, the film centers on Hsiao Si’r (Chang Chen), a boy from a middle-class home who veers into juvenile delinquency.

The film was selected as the Taiwanese entry for the Best Foreign Language Film at the 64th Academy Awards but was not nominated.

Since its release, A Brighter Summer Day has been praised as one of Yang's best works, one of the best films of the 1990s, of the 20th century and one of the greatest films of all time. It ranked 78th in the 2022 Sight & Sound Greatest Films of All Time poll, one of four Chinese-language films to be included, and above Yang's Yi Yi.

== Plot summary ==
Chang Chen (nickname Si'r), a junior high student in 1959 Taipei, is forced to attend night school after failing a test. This upsets his father, a career government worker, who is aware of and worried about the delinquency rampant among night school students. The next morning, Si'r and his father listen to a radio broadcast featuring distinguished students.

In 1960, Si'r, along with his best friend Cat, spy on an actress changing clothes during the filming of a drama in a movie studio. After being caught by a guard, they steal his flashlight and flee back to school. Si'r, noticing movement in a park, turns on the flashlight and startles a pair of lovers, though he does not see their faces clearly. Two gangs, the Little Park Boys and their rivals, the 217s, are introduced. Si'r is not a member of either gang, but he is closer to the Little Park Boys. The Little Park Boys are led by Honey, who is hiding in Tainan from the police after killing one of the 217s over his girlfriend Ming. Sly leads the gang in his absence. Sly and Si'r become rivals after Si'r gets Sly in trouble, believing that Sly and his girlfriend, Jade, are the pair of lovers he interrupted at the school at night. Meanwhile, Si'r and Ming meet by chance and become friends.

Ma, a transfer student with a violent reputation, joins the night school class and defends Si'r when a group of 217s come to harass him. The 217s saw Si'r with Ming, and also confuse him for another student, Tiger, who played basketball with her. Ma's family lives in a house abandoned by a Japanese military family after the war, and he has found a number of swords and knives in the attic, which he brags about to his new classmates. Ma and Si'r become friends. Ma teaches him to shoot and tries to dissuade him from taking romantic relationships seriously.

Sly proposes a truce, arranging a concert with members from both gangs. Honey unexpectedly resurfaces and berates Sly for setting up the concert. However, he realizes the gang respects Sly more than him. The night before the concert, Honey gives his blessing to Si'r's relationship with Ming, believing him to be a stable boyfriend. Si'r also befriends Horsecart, a member of a third gang Ma is associated with. The next night, Honey appears outside the concert hall, antagonizing the 217s. He takes an ostensibly friendly walk with the 217's leader, Shandong, only to be killed when Shandong pushes him in front of an oncoming car. Si'r and Deuce, Honey's younger brother, meet with the gang Horsecart is a member of, and they prepare for revenge. Si'r and Deuce watch as they murder the 217s with Japanese weapons during a typhoon. Sly goes into hiding. Si'r tries to get answers from a mortally wounded Shandong, but he dies while his girlfriend Crazy grieves for him. The same night, Si'r's father is arrested by the secret police and interrogated about his past connections with the Chinese Communist Party and Professor Hsia. While eventually freed, he is demoted.

Si'r starts dating Ming and seems to be improving academically. However, she reveals that many other men are flirtatious with her, including an older doctor who is treating her mother's severe asthma, which bothers Si'r. The next day, Si'r is expelled after lashing out at the doctor and smashing a light bulb. He promises to pass his transfer exams to get into day school, upsetting Ming, who knows this means she will see him less. Later, Sly emerges from hiding and apologizes to Si'r for their past feud, revealing that Ming and Ma are dating. Devastated, Si'r begins dating Jade, but he upsets her, and she bitterly reveals that the girl he saw kissing Sly was Ming, not her.

After threatening Ma at his home, Si'r steals a knife from Ma's stash that Cat had hidden in his bookshelf and waits outside the school for him. Instead, he sees Ming and berates her for her promiscuity, claiming that he is her only hope. Ming chides Si'r for being selfish and trying to change her, and tells him that like the world, she cannot be changed. He stabs her to death and breaks down in tears.

Si'r is sentenced to death, but the media frenzy surrounding the case prompts the sentence to be changed to 15 years of imprisonment. As the family prepares to move out of Si'r's former house, his mother unexpectedly finds Si'r's school uniform. As she sobs, the radio broadcasts the names of students who have qualified for places at schools in the recent exams.

== Cast ==
- Chang Chen as Hsiao Si'r or Chang Chen (Hsiao Si'r being a nickname that means "Little Four", or the fourth of five children)
- Chang Kuo-chu as Hsiao Si'r's father
- Elaine Jin as Hsiao Si'r's mother
- Lisa Yang as Ming
- Wong Chi-zan as Cat (Wang Mao)
- Lawrence Ko as Airplane
- Tan Chih-kang as Ma
- Lin Hong-ming as Honey
- Hung-Yu Chen as Sly
- Wang Chuan as Hsiao Si'r's eldest sister
- Chang Han as Lao Er (elder brother)
- Chiang Hsiu-chiung as Hsiao Si'r's middle sister
- Lai Fan-yun as Hsiao Si'r's youngest sister

== Production ==
Set in early 1960s, in Taipei, the film is based on a real incident that the director remembers from his school days when he was 13. The original Chinese title, 牯嶺街少年殺人事件, translates literally as "The Homicide Incident of the Youth on Guling Street", referring to the 14-year-old son of a civil servant who murders his girlfriend, who was also involved with a teenaged gang leader, for unclear reasons. The gang leader and girlfriend are involved in the conflict between gangs of children of formerly-mainland families and those of Taiwanese families. The film places the murder incident in the context of the political environment in Taiwan at that time. The film's political background is introduced in intertitles thus:

Millions of Mainland Chinese fled to Taiwan with the National Government after its civil war defeat by the Chinese Communists in 1949. Their children were brought up in an uneasy atmosphere created by the parents' own uncertainty about the future. Many formed street gangs to search for identity and to strengthen their sense of security.

Chang Kuo-chu, and his son Chang Chen (in his debut) are both cast in this film playing father and son.

Yang used Goodfellas as the model of a gangster movie.

== Critical reception ==
The film received much critical acclaim and was awarded several wins in Golden Horse Film Festival, Asia Pacific Film Festival, Kinema Junpo Awards and Tokyo International Film Festival. Three different versions of the film were edited: the original 237-minute version, a three-hour version and a shorter 127-minute version.

On the review aggregator website Rotten Tomatoes, 100% of 26 critics' reviews are positive, with an average rating of 9.4/10. The website's consensus reads: "A fantastic cinematic and artistic achievement, Edward Yang's A Brighter Summer Day depicts youth, ideals, violence and politics in a melancholic, tender light, culminating in a complex portrait of Taiwanese identity." Metacritic, which uses a weighted average, assigned the film a score of 91 out of 100, based on 6 critics, indicating "universal acclaim".

A.O. Scott wrote in his 2011 review for The New York Times, "In every aspect of technique —from the smoky colors and the bustling, off-center compositions to the architecture of the story and the emotional precision of the performances — this film is a work of absolute mastery." David Bordwell considers it his favorite Yang film and voted it as one of the 10 best films of the 1990s. He argues that in A Brighter Summer Day, Yang combined some of the cinematographic and staging tendencies that were revealed to him by his contemporary Hou Hsiao-hsien's A City of Sadness and other contemporary films. He also remarks that the "breadth of action is extraordinary, and a sense of the contradictory pulls of daily life emerges steadily... the result is a dispassionate look at teenaged passions, a deromanticized treatment of young people growing up in a repressive milieu." Jonathan Rosenbaum named it one of his 100 favorite films of all-time in 2004 and arguably the greatest Taiwanese film ever, likewise voted it one of the 10 best films of the 1990s, and extolled its "novelistic richness of character, setting, and milieu," use of objects, significance in the Taiwanese New Wave, and likened it to Rebel Without a Cause in their "nocturnal lyricism and cosmic despair." In Film Comment's best films of the 1990s poll, A Brighter Summer Day was considered one of the 10 best or 10 most underrated films of the 1990s by 7 critics, academics, and programmers, including Barbara Scharres, former programmer at the Chicago Film Center, who named it the film of the 1990s, calling it a "film that transforms narrative through its deeply personal sense of observation, and grips the emotions and imagination with its steadfast power." Ari Aster named it one of his favorite films in The Criterion Collection in 2018 and commented that "A Brighter Summer Day is just an amazing gangland epic. I don’t know how you watch it without becoming convinced that you’re watching the greatest movie ever made. It’s like The Godfather in that way."

== Themes ==
According to film critic Godfrey Cheshire, the film has "two faces, just as it has two titles" due to the sudden change of plots the film experiences halfway through its running time. A Brighter Summer Day shifts from a fraught, violent story about teenage gangs to a more introspective and family-oriented movie where the main character passively witnesses how his father is accused of espionage, his brother is in huge debt and his mother suffers in silence. Cheshire explains this transition of "faces":

The “outward” face is a highly critical view of a society in which all proper authority—a very Confucian concern—has been eroded or undermined, so that a young man like Xiao Si’r can be hurled into the spiral of violence indicated by the film’s Chinese title, which translates as “The Youth Killing Incident on Guling Street,” referring to a notorious crime that inspired the film. The “inward” face, meanwhile, indicated by the lyrics of the 1960 Elvis Presley hit “Are You Lonesome Tonight?” which gives the film its English title, has little to do with Taiwan and much to do with a condition unbound by time or place: the loneliness, melancholy, and longing of adolescence.

The film's story reflects divisions of nationality, culture, and age in Taiwan a decade after the island was occupied by the Nationalist Chinese government following the end of mainland China's civil war and the establishment of the Communist People's Republic of China. The young characters in the film are affected by the social dislocations caused by their families' exile, changes in traditional social values, the turmoil of young love and friendships, and the lack of a clear direction to a meaningful future. Gradually developing youth gangs, coming under the sponsorship of adult criminals, provide some degree of social acceptance. The adults in their lives, such as Si'r's father, are constricted by their own social status and jobs, the need for money, and unrewarding employment. Further context is seen in the ethnic and class tensions between Chinese, native Taiwanese, and Japanese residents of the island, as well as the cultural influence of the West, especially the United States.

== Restoration and home media ==
In 2009, the World Cinema Foundation issued a restoration of A Brighter Summer Day, using the original 35mm camera and sound negatives provided by the Edward Yang Estate.

In December 2015, The Criterion Collection announced that the film would be made available on Blu-ray and DVD in March 2016. The Criterion release features the film in a new 4K digital restoration with a monaural soundtrack (on the Blu-ray), and also includes a new audio commentary from critic Tony Rayns; a new interview with star Chang Chen; Our Time, Our Story, a nearly two-hour 2002 documentary covering the Taiwanese New Wave that features interviews with Yang, Hou Hsiao-hsien, and Tsai Ming Liang; a video-taped staged performance of Yang's 1992 play Likely Consequence; new English subtitle translations; an essay by film critic Godfrey Cheshire; and a Director's Statement from Yang written in 1991.

== See also ==
- List of submissions to the 64th Academy Awards for Best Foreign Language Film
- List of Taiwanese submissions for the Academy Award for Best Foreign Language Film
- List of films with a 100% rating on Rotten Tomatoes, a review aggregator website
