= Liao Ching-sung =

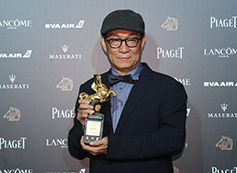

Liao Ching-sung (Chinese: 廖慶松; born March 5, 1950), also known as "Liao-san" (廖桑), is a Taiwanese film editor, known for his work with Taiwanese New Wave directors such as Hou Hsiao-hsien, Edward Yang and Wan Jen. He has received numerous accolades including two Golden Horse Awards for Outstanding Taiwanese Filmmaker of the Year, as well as the Special Contribution Award of Golden Horse Awards in 2018.

In addition to his work as an editor, Liao has also co-written screenplays with Wan Jen for Super Citizen (超級市民) and Super Citizen Ko. He has directed several movies, including Be My Lovely Child Again (期待你長大), and When the Ocean Is Blue (海水正藍). Since Flowers of Shanghai, he has also been the producer for many of Hou Hsiao-hsien's films.

== Early life ==
After graduating from Taipei Municipal Chenggong High School, Liao Ching-sung failed his college entrance exams. Instead of devoting another year to entering college, he applied for the technical training program of Central Motion Picture Corporation. Of roughly 200 applicants, only 50 were selected and Liao was among them. He was enrolled in October 1973 and joined the Central Pictures Editing Room (中影剪接室) in early 1974. The training program was divided into different groups for sound recording, editing, lighting, printing, and photography, among which Liao chose to study editing. He excelled in his studies and ranked first in his class upon graduation.

== Career ==
Liao started working as an assistant editor for Eternal Glory (英烈千秋) at Central Pictures in 1974. Later that year, he met Hou Hsiao-hsien while working at the Department of short film production at Central Pictures.

In 1978, Liao was nominated for his first Golden Horse Award for editing Li Hsing's movie, He Never Gives Up (汪洋中的一條船).

In 1980, Liao embarked on his first attempt at a new editing style with the film Love on The Wave (我踏浪而來) directed by Chen Kun-hou, in which he allowed a take to go longer than the customary style of studio films of the 1970s. The turning point of his career as a film editor did not occur until 1983, when he began editing The Boys from Fengkuei directed by Hou Hsiao-hsien. This film allowed him to break free from traditional editing rules and experiment with a new approach that shifted from "narrative logic" to "emotional logic".

Liao Ching-sung's editing expertise has been sought after not only by Taiwanese directors like Yee Chih-yen, Chen Hsin-yi (陳芯宜), and Yang Ya-che, but also by Mainland Chinese directors such as Wang Xiaoshuai and Liu Jie (劉杰). His editing work on Beijing Bicycle earned it the Grand Jury Prize at the Berlin Film Festival in 2001, while Courthouse on the Horseback was nominated in the Horizon section at the Venice Film Festival in 2006.

In recent years, Liao has continued to work on Mainland Chinese films that have garnered recognition at various film festivals, including Tharlo, which received four Golden Horse Awards nominations, Knife in the Clear Water (清水裡的刀子), which won the New Currents Award at the Busan Film Festival, Suburban Birds (郊區的鳥), which was nominated for the competition at the Locarno Film Festival, and The Summer Is Gone, which won the Best Picture award at the Golden Horse Awards. All of these films were edited by Liao Ching-sung.

== Filmography ==
Director
Year	Chinese title	English title
1987	期待你長大	Be My Lovely Child Again
1988	海水正藍	When The Ocean Is Blue
2004	大選民	Sacrificial Victims

Screenplay Writer
Year	Chinese title	English title
1985	超級市民	Super Citizen
1994	超級大國民	Super Citizen Ko

Editor
Year	Chinese title	English title	Note
1974	英烈千秋	Everlasting Glory	assistant editor
1976	八百壯士	Eight Hundred Heroes	co-editor
1978	汪洋中的一條船	He Never Gives Up	
1979	錦標	A Title Rewon	
1980	西風的故鄉	The Blind Love	
1980	血濺冷鷹堡	Mission over the Eagle Castle	
1980	天涼好個秋	Spring in Autumn	
1980	原鄉人	My Native Land	
1980	風雨中的燕子	A Swallow in the Storm	
1980	我踏浪而來	Love on The Wave	
1981	Z字特攻隊	Attack Force Z	
1981	上尉與我	The Captain and I	
1981	就是溜溜的她	Cute Girls	
1981	龍的傳人	The Land of the Brave	
1981	熱血	The Call Of Duty	
1981	男生女生實驗班	Male and Female Experimental Class	
1981	跟我說愛我		
1981	風兒踢踏踩	Cheerful Wind	
1982	俏如彩蝶飛飛飛	Six Is Company	
1982	動員令	Happy Days in the Army	
1982	在那河畔青草青	The Green, Green Grass of Home	
1982	光陰的故事	In Our Time	
1982	癡情奇女子		
1983	最長的一夜	The Night Ever So Long	
1983	竹劍少年	Kendo Kinds	
1983	代課老師	Now Taiwan Young Men	
1983	油麻菜籽	Ah-Fei	
1983	小畢的故事	Growing Up	
1983	兒子的大玩偶	The Sandwich Man	
1983	海灘的一天	That Day, on the Beach	
1984	阿福的禮物	The Gift of A Fu	
1984	單車與我	The Bike and I	
1984	小爸爸的天空	Out of The Blue	
1984	我愛瑪麗	I Love Mary	
1984	霧裡的笛聲	Nature is Quiet Beautiful	
1984	風櫃來的人	The Boys from Fengkuei	
1984	冬冬的假期	A Summer at Grandpa's	
1985	超級市民	Super Citizen	
1985	結婚	His Matrimony	
1985	童年往事	A Time to Live, A Time to Die	
1986	流浪少年路	Drifters	
1986	恐怖份子	Terrorizers	
1986	戀戀風塵	Dust in The Wind	
1986	福德正神	Fu De Zheng Shen	
1987	桂花巷	Osmanthus Alley	
1987	惜別海岸	The Farewell Coast	
1987	期待你長大	Be My Lovely Child Again	
1987	尼羅河女兒	Daughter of the Nile	
1988	春秋茶室	Spring and Autumn Tea House	
1989	悲情城市	A City of Sadness	
1989	立體奇兵	The 3-D Army	
1990	阿嬰	Ming Ghost	
1990	兄弟珍重	Fraternity	
1991	上海假期	My American Grandson	
1991	胭脂	The Story of Taipei Women	
1992	少年吔，安啦！	Dust of Angels	
1993	戲夢人生	The Puppetmaster	
1994	多桑	A Borrowed Life	
1994	超級大國民	Super Citizen Ko	
1995	好男好女	Good Men, Good Women	
2001	千禧曼波	Millennium Mambo	
2001	愛你愛我	Betelnut Beauty	
2002	美麗時光	The Best of Times	
2002	7-11之戀	Love at 7-11	
2002	十七歲的單車	Beijing Bicycle	
2002	夢幻部落	Somewhere Over The Dreamland	
2002	藍色大門	Blue Gate Crossing	
2004	五月之戀	Love of May	
2004	20 30 40	20 30 40	
2005	愛麗絲的鏡子	Reflections	
2006	血戰到底	Karmic Mahjong	
2006	太陽雨	Rain Dogs	
2006	馬背上的法院	Courthouse on the Horseback	
2006	姨媽的後現代生活	The Postmodern Life of My Aunt	
2006	吳清源	The Go Master	
2006	練習曲	Island Etude	
2007	尋找蔣經國─有！我是蔣經國	Chiang Ching-kuo	
2007	紅氣球	Flight of the Red Balloon	
2007	流浪神狗人	God Man Dog	
2022	石門	Stonewalling	
2025	五花肉	The Taste of Pork Belly	

Producer
Year	Chinese title	English title	Note
1994	超級大國民	Super Citizen Ko	
1998	海上花	Flowers of Shanghai	
2001	千禧曼波	Millennium Mambo	
2002	夢幻部落	Somewhere Over The Dreamland	
2004	風中緋櫻─霧社事件	Dana Sakura	TV series
2005	最好的時光	Three Times	
2005	愛麗絲的鏡子	Reflections	
2007	紅氣球	Flight of the Red Balloon	

== Awards and honors ==
Year	Award	Category	Work	Outcome	Ref.
1978	The Golden Horse Awards	Best Editing Award	He Never Gives Up	Nominated	
1984	The Golden Horse Awards	Best Editing Award	The Boys from Fengkuei	Nominated	
1985	The Golden Horse Awards	Best Editing Award	His Matrimony	Nominated	
1989	The Golden Horse Awards	Best Editing Award	A City of Sadness	Nominated	
1995	The Golden Horse Awards	Best Editing Award	Good Men, Good Women	Nominated	
1995	The Golden Horse Awards	Best Original Screenplay	Super Citizen Ko	Nominated	
2001	The Golden Horse Awards	Best Editing Award	Beijing Bicycle	Nominated	
2002	The Golden Horse Awards	Best Editing Award	The Best Of Times	Nominated	
2002	The Golden Horse Awards	Outstanding Taiwanese Filmmaker of the Year		Won	
2005	The Golden Horse Awards	Best Editing Award	Three Times	Nominated	
2013	The Golden Horse Awards	Outstanding Taiwanese Filmmaker of the Year		Won	
2015	The Golden Horse Awards	Best Editing Award	The Assassin	Nominated	
2017	The Golden Horse Awards	Best Editing Award	The Foolish Bird	Nominated	
2018	The Golden Horse Awards	Best Editing Award	Us And Them	Nominated	
2018	The Golden Horse Awards	Special Contribution Award		Won	
