= Courthouse on the Horseback =

2006 film

- Directed by: Liu Jie
- Written by: Lifu Wang
- Starring: Li Baotian
- Cinematography: Harrison Zhang
- Edited by: Liao Ching-sung
- Release date: 2006
- Country: China
- Language: Mandarin

Courthouse on the Horseback (Chinese: 马背上的法庭, "Ma bei shang de fa ting") is a 2006 Chinese drama film directed by Liu Jie.

The film won the Horizons competition at the 63rd edition of the Venice Film Festival.

== Cast ==
- Li Baotian as Judge Feng
- Yang Yaning as Aunt Yang
- Lu Yulai as Judge Ah-Luo
- Li Tingliang as Yao Ge
