= The Triangle Land =

2012 Chinese film by Chen Kunhou

- Film poster
- Traditional Chinese: 三角地
- Simplified Chinese: 三角地
- Hanyu Pinyin: Sānjiǎodì
- Directed by: Chen Kun-hou
- Written by: Chen Ching-Hui
- Based on: The Triangle Land by Cao Wenxuan
- Produced by: Du Youling; Zhang Huafu
- Starring: Yang Chengcheng; Hsieh Dong-Yu; Zhu Zhi-Ying; Honduras; Cindy Mong; Chiu Yen-Hsiang; Ken Lin
- Cinematography: Jiang Shenfeng
- Edited by: Hsiao Ju-kuan
- Music by: Chen Rushan
- Production companies: Imperial Film and Television Corporation
- Distributed by: Mei Ah Entertainment
- Release dates: 9 November 2012 (China); 4 January 2013 (Taiwan)
- Running time: 96 minutes
- Countries: China; Taiwan; Hong Kong
- Language: Mandarin

The Triangle Land (Chinese: 三角地) is a 2012 Chinese romantic comedy film directed by Chen Kun-hou and written by Chen Ching-Hui. The film stars Yang Chengcheng, Hsieh Dong-Yu, Zhu Zhi-Ying, Honduras, Cindy Mong, Chiu Yen-Hsiang, and Ken Lin. The film is an adaptation of Cao Wenxuan's novel of the same name.

The Triangle Land was released in mainland China on November 9, 2012, and in Taiwan on January 4, 2013.

== Plot ==
The film is about the life of a family of seven. Ah Nan is a senior university student, he loves his classmate Dan Niu, a beautiful girl who comes back from Canada. When Dan Niu knowns Ah Nan's parents are drunkard and gambler and his brothers are thief and blockhead, they break up. After losing his love, Ah Nan drops out. Phoebe, a friend of Ah Nan, her parents died of a plane crash, but she doesn't give up her hope for life. Ah Nan is influenced by Phoebe and determines to live hard and changes the situation. The whole family is influenced by his spirit, they open a boarding house.

== Cast ==
- Yang Chengcheng as Dan Niu
- Hsieh Dong-Yu as Ah Nan
- Zhu Zhi-Ying as Phoebe
- Honduras as Chen's father
- Cindy Mong as Chen's mother
- Chiu Yen-Hsiang as Ceramist
- Ken Lin as Ah Kai
- Qiu Ruiyong as Da Fei
- Lin Yongxu as Xiao Kang
- Wu Yaruo as Tongtong

== Production ==
Most of the film was shot on location in Miaoli County.

== Release ==
The film premiered at the Capital Cinema on November 7, 2012, in Beijing. The film was released on November 9, 2012, in mainland China, and on January 4, in Taiwan.

== Accolades ==
Date	Award	Category	Recipient(s) and nominee(s)	Result	Notes
2013	Baihe Awards	Special Jury Award	The Triangle Land	Won	
