= My Native Land (film) =

1980 film by Li Hsing

- Theatrical release poster
- Directed by: Li Hsing
- Screenplay by: Chang Yung-hsiang
- Produced by: Wang Wei-jean Li
- Starring: Chin Han; Joan Lin; Yen Cheng-kuo
- Cinematography: Chen Kun-hou
- Edited by: Liao Ching-sung
- Music by: Huang Mou-Shan
- Distributed by: Ta Chung Motion Picture Corporation
- Release date: 16 August 1980 (Taiwan)
- Running time: 104 minutes
- Country: Taiwan
- Language: Mandarin

My Native Land (Chinese: 原鄉人; pinyin: Yuánxiāng rén), also called China, My Native Land, is a Mandarin-language film, directed by Li Hsing and released in 1980 by Ta Chung Motion Picture Corporation (大眾電影華股份有限公司, TCMPC) in Taiwan. It is a biographical film about the Hakka writer Chung Li-ho.

== Cast ==
- Chin Han as Chung Li-ho
- Joan Lin
- Yen Cheng-kuo

== Crew ==
- Director: Li Hsing
- Presented by Ruby Loke (陸元堅)
- Planned by Liu Teng-shan (劉登善)
- Screenplay by Chang Yung-hsiang
- Cinematography: Chen Kun-hou (陳坤厚)
- Executive producer: Chen Ru-ling (陳汝霖)
- Lighting by Lee Ya-tung (李亞東)

== Soundtrack ==
The My Native Land soundtrack album was released by Taiwanese singer Teresa Teng in 1980. It was released as Yuan Xiangren (原鄉人) by Polydor Records and Yuan Xiangqing Nong (原鄉情濃) by Kolin Records (歌林). The songs written by Zhuang Nu (莊奴) and Tony Wong (翁清溪), as well as "Evening Wind and Flower Scent" (晩風花香), are heard in the film. The soundtrack was re-released in 1981 by Polydor Records as Yuan Xiangqing Nong. Two tracks are replaced, and another track is added. All releases have film theme songs intact.

All lyrics are written by Zhuang Nu (莊奴); all music is composed by Tony Wong (翁清溪), credited as Tony (湯尼).

Yuan Xiangren soundtrack – Polydor edition
No.	Title	Lyrics	Music	Chinese title	Length
1.	"The Natives"			原鄉人 yuan xiangren
2.	"Invite the Winds After the Clouds"			迎著風跟著雲 ying zhe feng genzhe yun
3.	"His Heart, My Heart"	Lin Huang-kuen 林煌坤	Andy 安蒂	君心我心 jun xin wo xin
4.	"The Song of Victory"			勝利的歌聲 shengli de gesheng
5.	"Autumn Light"		Ken-Ichiro Morioka 森岡賢一郎	秋光 qiu guang
6.	"Wang Yi Wang"			望一望
7.	"Strong Native Pride"			原鄉情濃 yuan xiangqing nong
8.	"Evening Winds and Fragrances"		(Unknown)	晩風花香 wanfeng huaxiang
9.	"A River Must Junction with a River"			江水要比河水長 jiangshui yao bi heshui chang
10.	"Good Night"		Kimiaki Inomata (猪俣公章)	良夜 Liang ye

Yuan Xiangqing Nong soundtrack – Kolin edition
No.	Title	Lyrics	Music	Chinese title	Length
1.	"Strong Native Pride"			原鄉情濃
2.	"His Heart, My Heart"	Lin Huang-kuen	Andy	君心我心
3.	"Invite the Winds After the Clouds"			迎著風跟著雲
4.	"Wang Yi Wang"			望一望
5.	"Autumn Light"		Ken-Ichiro Morioka	秋光
6.	"The Natives"			原鄉人
7.	"Evening Winds and Fragrances"		Unknown	晩風花香
8.	"River Must Junction with a River"			江水要比河水長
9.	"The Song of Victory"			勝利的歌聲
10.	"Good Night"		Kimiaki Inomata	良夜

Yuan Xiangqing Nong soundtrack – Polydor edition
No.	Title	Lyrics	Music	Chinese title	Length
1.	"Strong Native Pride"			原鄉情濃
2.	"White Beach" (or "Empty Beach")		Takashi Miki 三木たかし	白沙灘 bai shatan
3.	"Wang yi wang"			望一望
4.	"The Plum Blossom" (Originally sung by Jenny Tseng for the 1976 film, Victory)	Liu Chia-chang	Liu Chia-chang	梅花 (meihua)
5.	"The Song of Victory"			勝利的歌聲
6.	"Evening Winds and Fragrances"			晩風花香
7.	"The Natives"			原鄉人
8.	"Ripples in My Heart"		Takashi Miki 三木たかし	心湖裡起漣漪 xin hu li qi lianyi
9.	"Invite the Winds After the Clouds"			迎著風跟著雲
10.	"His Heart, My Heart"			君心我心
11.	"River Must Junction with a River"			江水要比河水長
