= Osmanthus Alley =

1987 film

- Video cover
- Directed by: Chen Kun-hou
- Written by: Ding Yah-Ming; Li Horng Shiau; Wu Nien-jen
- Produced by: Raymond Chow; Hui San-Chi
- Starring: Lu Hsiao-fen; Lin Hsiu-ling; Wakin Chau
- Cinematography: Chen Kun-hou; Chu Hon-Cheung
- Edited by: Liao Ching-sung
- Music by: Chen Yang
- Production companies: Central Motion Picture Corporation; Orange Sky Golden Harvest; Scholar Films Co., Ltd.
- Release date: 5 September 1987
- Running time: 112 minutes
- Country: Taiwan
- Languages: Taiwanese Hokkien (original version); Mandarin (1987 theatrical release)

Osmanthus Alley (Chinese: 桂花巷; pinyin: Guì Huā Xiàng) is a 1987 Taiwanese drama film directed by Chen Kun-hou. The film was selected as the Taiwanese entry for the Best Foreign Language Film at the 60th Academy Awards, but was not accepted as a nominee.

== Plot ==
Set in early 1900s, young Ti-Hung (Lu Hsiao-Fen) and her younger brother, Ti-Jiang became orphaned when their mother died. Being the elder sibling, Ti-Hung took care of her younger brother while being under the charge of their aunt and uncle.

As years passed by, Ti-Hung grew up to be a pretty young lady with impeccable embroidery skills and tiny bound feet. Her feet and embroidery works were noticed by a wealthy old matriarch, Lady Li of North Gate, who offered her only grandson, Rui Yu's (Wakin Chau), hand in marriage to Ti-Hung. A fellow villager and poor fisherman, Ah Hai (Simon Yam), who is also a friend of Ti-jiang, is fond of Ti-Hung.

Ti-Hung was born with what is known as the "Cut Palm" fate. Men born with such a fate would become an official or a great person, whereas women born with the "cut palm" would be a jinx to the men in their life. Ti-Hung overhears Ti-jiang and his fellow fisherman's friends talking about this and is affected by it. At that same moment, Ti-Jiang dies during a drowning accident while out fishing.

Now that she is alone and by herself, Ti-Hung agrees to marry Rui Yu. Being married into the wealthy Hsin family would also pave her way out of poverty.

Life was rosy for Ti-Hung after marriage and she soon gave birth to a son, Hui Chih. But happiness for her was short-lived. Rui Yu dies of pneumonia and leaves behind his 23-year-old wife with a young 5-year-old child. Without the support from old Lady Li, Rui Yu's uncle volunteers to handle the family's account in the absence of his nephew. Being the only kin of Hui Chih, Ti-Hung became an over-protective and strict mother. Ti-Hung blames her bad fate for the cause of Rui Yu's early demise. However, when she found out that her late husband was meant to be short-lived through revelation from Rui Yu's uncle of a monk's predictions of Rui Yu when he was a young boy, she felt relieved.

Free from guilt, Ti-Hung starts to enjoy her new status as mistress of the family while living off her inheritance. She became addicted to opera and neglected her duties to her family until her long time personal maid, Hsin Yue, hinted to her of the family slowly falling apart. Not only was Rui Yu's uncle the main caregiver to Hui Chih, but he was also heavily addicted to opium. Going through the family's accounts, Ti-Hung realised that Rui Yu's uncle had piled on debts through his unhealthy habit. For the safety of Hui Chih, she sent him away to Japan for further studies while she stayed back to settle issues with her uncle.

Not long after, Rui Yu's uncle died and she attended his wake while feigning sorrow. Ironically, she picked up opium smoking while at the wake. From there, she took a liking to her uncle's personal young servant, Chun Shu (Tuo Chung-hua), and began an affair with him. Noticing that Chun Shu starts getting cocky after their one-night stand, Ti-Hung sets him up for theft and have him put away in a bid to silence him about their affair.

Shortly after, Ti-Hung realises that she is pregnant and tries to hide the pregnancy when a grown up Hui Chih comes back to visit his mother. Eventually, Ti-Hung comes clean to Hui Chih on her pregnancy. Hui Chih accepts it and plans to bring his mother to Japan for a vacation and deliver her child so as not to incite rumours and gossips in their hometown. The newborn is then given up for adoption in Japan.

Back in her hometown, Ti-Hung worries about Hsin Yue's youth and marriageability. Hsin Yue reveals that a dowry was made to her for her hand in marriage. The proposal came from Ah Chu, a family staff (and Hsin Yue's crush) that Ti-Hung fired many years ago for allegedly 'leading Hui Chih astray'. Happy for Hsin Yue, yet sad at the same time, Ti-Hung gives her blessings to the couple.

Decades later, Ti-Hung encounters Ah Hai at a temple and learns that he has become a wealthy businessman. Meanwhile, Hui Chih is frequently occupied with his work as a delegate to Japan and rarely visits or contacts his mother. Alone in her residence, Ti-Hung experiences flashbacks of her youth before dying.

== Cast ==
- Lu Hsiao-fen as Ti Hung
- Lin Hsiu-ling as Hsin Yue
- Wakin Chau as Rui Yu
- Tuo Chung-hua as Chun Shu
- Simon Yam as Ah Hai

== Restoration ==
A 4K restoration of the film, sourced from the original 35mm negative with audio taken from the 35mm Taiwanese-language sound negative, was completed by the Taiwan Film and Audiovisual Institute (TFAI). It had its world premiere at the Lumière Festival's International Classic Film Market in Lyon on 12 October 2026, opening the festival's first "Taiwan in Focus" programme, with Chen Kun-hou and Lu Hsiao-fen in attendance. The restoration reinstates the film's original Taiwanese Hokkien soundtrack: Chen had insisted on shooting in Taiwanese, but the state-run Central Motion Picture Corporation released the film in Mandarin in line with the government's language policy of the time, and the Taiwanese version played in only a limited number of theatres.

== See also ==
- List of submissions to the 60th Academy Awards for Best Foreign Language Film
- List of Taiwanese submissions for the Academy Award for Best Foreign Language Film
