= In Our Time (1982 film) =

- Film poster
- Directed by: Tao Te-chen; Edward Yang; Ko I-chen; Yi Chang
- Written by: Tao Te-chen; Edward Yang; Ko I-chen; Yi Chang
- Produced by: Ming Che
- Starring: Lan Sheng-Wen; Shih An-ni; Li Kuo-hsui; Sylvia Chang
- Cinematography: Chen Chia-mao
- Edited by: Liao Ching-sung
- Music by: Chen Yunshan
- Production company: Central Motion Picture Corporation
- Release date: 28 August 1982
- Running time: 100, 106 or 109 minutes
- Languages: Mandarin; Southern Min

In Our Time (Chinese: 光陰的故事) is a 1982 Taiwanese anthology film directed by Edward Yang, Yi Chang, Ko I-chen and Tao Te-Chen. Each set in a different decade between 1950 and 1980. The vignettes explore various themes and genres, including drama, comedy, economics, and society, and showcase characters at different stages in their lives.

== Style ==
The film is divided into four segments that differ in terms of theme, tone, and style. The first two episodes are more reflective and dreamlike, whereas the latter two episodes have more dialogue and overt comedy. Tao's "Dinosaurs" or "Little Dragon Head" segment tells the story of a young boy who creates a fantasy world populated by his dinosaur toys to escape from parental neglect and social rejection. Yang's "Expectations" or "Desires" episode follows a teenage girl who develops feelings for an older man staying at her house, leading to a love triangle. In Ko's "Leapfrog" segment, a college student tries to cope with the pressures of life by starting a club and organizing a competition. Finally, Yi Chang's "Show Your ID" or "Say Your Name" segment features Sylvia Chang as a newly-married woman who, along with her husband, gets accidentally locked out of their house and barred from their workplace, resulting in comedic situations.

Produced by the conservative Central Motion Picture Corporation, In Our Time marked director Edward Yang’s second feature film project, following a TV movie he directed a year prior. Yang's segment in the film was noted by John Anderson as being more documentary-like in content, with a poetic touch added to it in "Expectations". According to the Harvard Film Archive, the film stands out for its hard-hitting and realistic portrayal of everyday life, rather than indulging in escapist or melodramatic themes. In Our Time is often considered as a key film in the New Taiwanese Cinema movement, which prioritized authentic representations of Taiwanese culture and society on screen.

== Origin ==
In the 1970s, Taiwan's film industry was dominated by melodramas for nearly two decades until the import of Hong Kong cinema, which achieved tremendous commercial success. Considering the decline in Taiwanese film industry, young intellectuals including Hsiao Yei and Wu Nien-jen recruited by the Central Motion Picture Corporation (CMPC), an official propaganda organization under the ruling KMT nationalist party, realized that Taiwan cinema was in need of innovation and embarked on a groundbreaking endeavor. Enlisting a fresh new wave of young directors, they aimed to revolutionize the film landscape by defying the conventions of melodrama and introducing a new cinematic style. It was against this backdrop that In Our Time was born.

The English title In Our Time was derived from Ernest Hemingway's first work, suggesting a sense of modernity. This film made an attempt to explore Taiwanese society through a fresh approach and faced contemporary reality with an open mindset. On the other hand, the original Chinese title 光陰的故事 (Guangyin de Gushi) translates to "The Story That Unfolds with the Passage of Time", emphasizing the trajectory formed by the four interconnected stories that make up the film. Therefore, the film marked a significant departure from the traditional narrative and visual aesthetics, signaling the emergence of Taiwan New Cinema. Grounded in realism, Taiwan New Cinema focuses on capturing the beauty of the slow, the gentle rhythm of life. These films embraced unconventional narrative structures, leaving behind the melodramatic building of tension and adopting a lifelike pacing.

== Plot ==
=== Little Dragon Head (29 mins) ===
A shy taciturn young boy called Hsiao-mao (Little Cat) leads an unhappy life. At home, his parents neglect him, favoring his little brother and chiding him for playing with his dinosaur toys instead of studying. At school, he is ostracized by his classmates, who play pranks on him. When Hsiao-mao's parents receive a radio from a wealthier couple, the family starts visiting them for tea and to watch television. At the couple's home, Hsiao-mao draws a picture of his T-Rex figurine, but the couple's young daughter of a similar age takes it as hers. Returning home, Hsiao-mao dreams of himself playing jovially with dinosaurs, accompanied by apes playing instruments. One day during recess at school, Hsiao-mao stares at a popular girl at school as she walks towards and past him, a sight that causes further teasing from other students and him fighting with them. That afternoon, his father throws his T-Rex figurine away and they visit the couple's home again. This time, without his toy, Hsiao-mao has nothing to draw, but the girl proposes that they sneak out to the garbage dump to find the figurine. They manage to return home with the figurine without anyone's notice, and Hsiao-mao draws a picture of the girl's doll holding the figurine. That night, it is revealed that the couple and the girl are flying somewhere, and it is unclear when a reunion will happen again. The vignette is bookended by shots of a record player playing a record.

=== Expectation (29 mins) ===
A teenage girl, Hsiao-fang embarks on a journey of self-discovery and navigates her budding romantic feelings for an older university student who is boarding with her family. One night, she inadvertently witnesses her sister being intimate with the male student. Through Yang's careful attention to detail and atmosphere, the film sensitively portrays the nuances of Hsiao-fang's emotional transformation. The film captures the intensity of her desires and the complexities of navigating sexual awakening within a family setting in the 1960s Taiwan. The film provides a glimpse into the societal characteristics of its era, reflecting factors such as industrialization, the influence of the Cold War, and the impact of American pop culture. Notably, the 1960s saw the widespread popularity of television and radio, which became media in the 1960s that connected people with the world. This period also witnessed the significant events such as the Vietnam War and the rise of the Beatles, along with the emergence of youth culture. Through its portrayal of these dynamics, "Expectation” stands as a testament to Edward Yang's exceptional ability to capture the subtleties of human emotions and relationships. Even at the early stages of his career, Yang skillfully drives the plot forward through a combination of visual and auditory elements. The choice of "Expectation" as the title of his directorial debut is a deliberate self-declaration, demonstrating his artistic vision and his intention to make a statement society.

=== Leapfrog (31 mins) ===
Tu Shih-lien (nicknamed Fatty) is a male college student who owns a frog and is somewhat dissatisfied with life. He tries to liven things up by setting up an international student's club after his previous club collapsed and working as a weekend driver. One night, he takes dinner to a hung-over tenant, Ms. Chang, and quickly develops a crush on her. His father, a real estate company owner, wants him to transfer to major in architecture and inherit his position, but Fatty is only interested in philosophy and computer science. Meanwhile, other students cannot help him set up his activity so he vents his anger by swimming vigorously in a river during a downpour. Later, he confronts the student responsible for approving activities, who approves his club, on the condition that this time, the Chinese students will defeat the international students in a competition, which they lost the last time, and win back honor. On the day of the competition, both Fatty and a friend run for election to represent the Chinese students in a swimming competition, but Fatty's friend receives one more vote than him. While driving his friend to the competition site, Fatty's motorcycle crashes and Fatty's friend is injured. Though without mental preparation, Fatty agrees to participate in place of his friend in a competition that consists of one section of swimming, one section of running with a flag, one section of swimming, and a final section of running, with the first person planting the flag the winner. On the last stretch, Fatty trails behind an international student, but only then does the international student realize that he had inadvertently grabbed the wrong flag, and thus Fatty wins. As the students celebrate, Ms. Chang throws him a bouquet of flowers.

=== Say Your Name (21 mins) ===
A young couple has just moved into a new apartment and the place is a mess, not to mention that a man with a constantly barking dog lives next door. After an argument, the wife leaves for her first day of work. The husband goes down to his mailbox to get his newspaper, but gets into an argument with a man who does not recognize the new resident and claims that the newspaper is his. Meanwhile, two kids going to school tell the boyfriend that they closed the door for him, and without a key, the husband is locked outside of his apartment. The husband approaches neighbors for help, but to no avail, and, with only a pair of underwear on and a towel around his waist, is forced to go out onto the street and call his girlfriend's company on a payphone, but cannot find her because the wife had arrived at the company but had left her company ID at home and is barred from entering. On her way home to get her ID, the wife gets stuck in traffic and decides to get out of her taxi and run home. The husband tries to scale an exterior wall to get into his apartment, but is mistaken by neighbors as a thief, including the dog owner, who hits him and causes him to fall to the ground. The wife arrives in time with the apartment key and the misunderstandings are resolved. The couple can live out a relatively peaceful life.

== Cast ==
=== Little Dragon Head ===
Sheng-Wen Lan as Fatty

=== Expectation ===
An-ni Shih as Hsiao-Fang

Ya-tung Sun as tenant

Emily Y. Chang as Hsiao-Fang's sister

=== Leapfrog ===
Kuo-hsui Li as College Student

=== Say Your Name ===
Sylvia Chang as Wife

Li-chun Lee as Husband

== Critical reception ==
Film critic Jean-Michel Frodon recognizes that In Our Time serves as a witness to the ongoing changes in Taiwanese society, with Edward Yang's "Expectation" singled out as a significant aesthetic response to this process of modernization.

Film scholar Hong Guo-jun argues that In Our Time is a pioneering project of Taiwan New Cinema, embracing a realist approach to depict the modern history of Taiwan. Hong uses the final segment, "Say Your Name" as an example to emphasize the film's aim to portray "reality" not only as it is or should be, but also as a product of its creation and representation. Here, "reality" is no longer depicted as static as in the previous film movement Healthy Realism, but rather as a collection of dynamic conditions in which cinema plays a crucial and active role.

Film scholar June Yip highlights how the collaborative nature of In Our Time, where a group of young filmmakers dared to explore innovative approaches to cinematography, lighting, editing, and sound design within the established studio system. Their collaborative efforts led to advancements in technical equipment standards, fostering growth and creativity within the movement. Notably, Du Duzhi, the sound designer-editor for In Our Time, played a pivotal role in the Taiwan New Cinema movement. His contributions to sound design and recording techniques earned him recognition and led to a close working relationship with Edward Yang and Hou Hsiao-hsien.
