= Cinema of Taiwan =

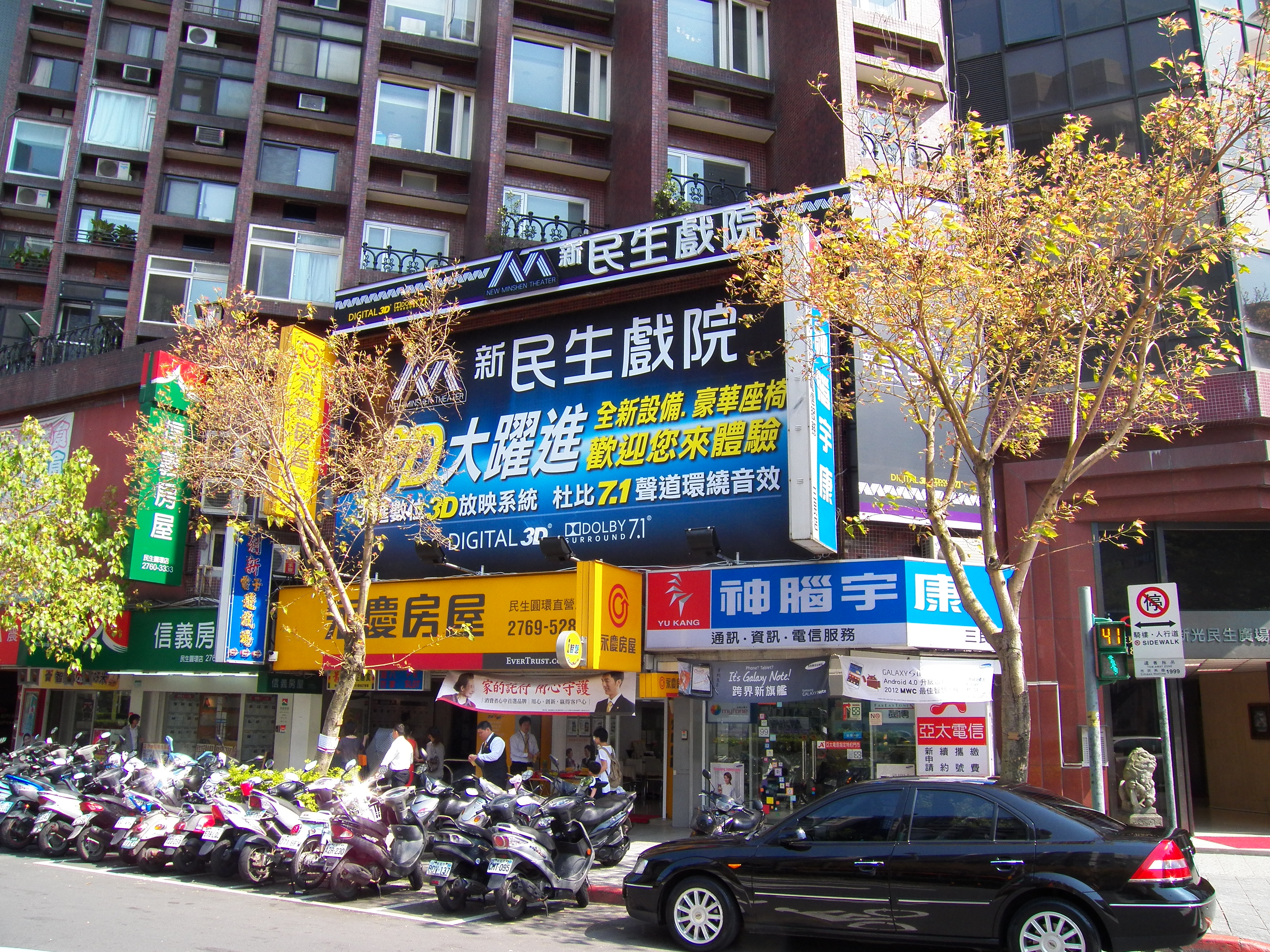
- Mingshen Theater
- No. of screens: 955 (2023)

Gross box office (2017)
- Total: $106 million
- National films: $7.29 million (6.90%)

The cinema of Taiwan or Taiwan cinema (Chinese: 臺灣電影 or 台灣電影) is deeply rooted in the island's unique history. Since its introduction to Taiwan in 1901 under Japanese rule, cinema has developed in Taiwan under ROC rule through several distinct stages, including taiyu pian (Taiwanese film) of the 1950s and 1960s, genre films of the 1960s and 1970s, including jiankang xieshi pian (healthy realist film), wuxia pian (sword-fighting film), aiqing wenyi pian (literary romantic film), zhengxuan pian (political propaganda film), and shehui xieshi pian (social realist film), Taiwan New Cinema of the 1980s, and the new wave of the 1990s and afterwards. Starting in the second decade of the new millennium, documentary films also became a representative part of Taiwan cinema.

== Characteristics ==
=== Taiwanese directors ===
Taiwan cinema is internationally known for its representative directors, including King Hu, Hou Hsiao-hsien, Edward Yang, Ang Lee, Tsai Ming-liang, Chang Tso-chi, Chung Mong-hong, Giddens Ko and Midi Z.

=== Influence of the government ===
From the late Japanese colonial period to martial law in Taiwan, the development of Taiwanese film was dominated by the official camp studio development. The film produced during that stage was mainly news footage taken by the government-run studio (Taiwan film companies, the Central Motion Picture Corporation, China Film Studio) and political propaganda. Even today, the Taiwanese government maintains a "Film Fund" to financially support the film industry of the country. The fund is somewhat controversial yet is still well supported.

The Government Information Office was in charge of the film grant before 2012. Grants were divided into two groups of $5 million and $800 million. The production cost works out to be around a minimum of $120 million across 15 films. The application contains certain specifications to allow the correct amount of money to be allocated to a given film's production, for example the purpose of the $5 million grant is to encourage new directors directing a feature film for the first time.

The Ministry of Culture is in charge of film policy and film industry since 2012.

=== Documentaries ===
After the documentary about Taiwan's traumatic earthquake in 1999 Life (生命, 2004) garnered then record-high 30,000,000NT at the box office, documentary films from Taiwan have also become more popular. The development of Taiwanese documentaries began after lifting of martial law in 1987 and the rise in popularity of small electronic camcorders, as well as the support and promotion provided by the Taiwan Council for Cultural Affairs. Documentaries also receive support from other government agencies and private corporations. A variety of film festivals and awards have been established to encourage the production of documentaries.

Taiwanese documentaries often deal with themes related to the filmmaker or their family, and explore serious social or political issues. These documentaries have started to gain international attention gradually, and many have gone on to win awards at international film festivals.

== Early cinema, 1900–1945 ==
The first film was introduced into Taiwan by Toyojirō Takamatsu (高松豊次郎; see 高松豐次郎) in 1901. Taiwanese cinema was the first, and from 1900 to 1937, one of the most important of Japan's colonial film markets during the era of Japanese rule. In 1905, Takamatsu raised 10,000 Japanese yen in donations to the Japanese military from the proceeds of films screened in Taiwan about the Russo-Japanese War. By 1910, the Taiwan Colonial Government coordinated the efforts of independent filmmakers such as Takamatsu and others to establish a more organized approach to the production of film in the colony of Taiwan. Films played a vital role in enabling the larger colonial project of imperialization or cultural assimilation of Taiwanese subjects into the Japanese empire. The first silent film produced in Taiwan was An Introduction to the Actual Condition of Taiwan, a propaganda documentary that Takamatsu directed in 1907. Takamatsu noted that early films were produced mostly for Japanese audiences rather than for local Taiwanese. Hence, early films tended to be educational in nature, lauding Japan's modernizing presence on the island. Other films catered to Japanese audiences exotic desires for Taiwan as a place of adventure and danger such as Conquering Taiwan's Native Rebels (1910) and Heroes of the Taiwan Extermination Squad (1910).

Many conventions in Japanese films were adopted by the Taiwanese filmmakers. For example, the use of a benshi (narrator of silent films), which was a very important component of the film-going experience in Japan, was adopted and renamed piān-sū by the Taiwanese. This narrator was very different from its equivalent in the Western world. It rapidly evolved into a star system but one based on the Japanese system. In fact, people would go to see the very same film narrated by different benshi, to hear the other benshi's interpretation. A romance could become a comedy or a drama, depending on the narrator's style and skills. Lu, a famous actor and benshi in Taiwan wrote the best reference book on Taiwanese cinema. The first Taiwanese benshi master was a musician and composer named Wang Yung-feng, who had played on a regular basis for the orchestra at the Fang Nai Ting Theatre in Taipei. He was also the composer of the music for the Chinese film Tao hua qi xue ji (China, Peach girl, 1921) in Shanghai. Other famous Taiwanese benshi masters were Lu Su-Shang and Zhan Tian-Ma. Lu Su-shang, is not primarily remembered for his benshi performances, but mainly for writing the inestimable history of cinema and drama in Taiwan. The most famous benshi of all was possibly Zhan Tian-ma, whose story is told in a recent Taiwanese biographical film, March of Happiness (Taiwan, 1999, dir: Lin Sheng-shing). Benshi masters frequently were intellectuals: many spoke Japanese, often traveled to Japan and/or China, and some were poets who wrote their own librettos for each film. From 1910, films started to be distributed with a script, but the benshi often preferred to continue with their own interpretations. Notable films during this period include Song of Sadness (哀愁の歌, 1919), The Eyes of Buddha (仏陀の瞳, 1922), and Whose Mistake? (誰の過失, 1925).

Unlike Japanese-occupied Manchuria, Taiwan never became an important production market for Japan but rather was a vital exhibition market. Japanese-produced newsreels, shorts, educational, and feature films were widely circulated throughout Taiwan from the mid-1920s through 1945 and even after decolonization. As in Japan's other colonial film markets, the Second Sino-Japanese War in 1937 marked the beginning of an era of enhanced mobilization for the Japanese war effort throughout Asia and Taiwan's film markets were purged of American and Chinese films as a result. The Japanese strove to transform the locals into Japanese citizens, giving them Japanese names, a Japanese education, encouraging them to wear Japanese clothes and the men to cut their long hair. Films such as Japanese Police Supervise a Taiwanese Village (1935) illustrated how "proper" imperial subjects should dress and act as well as promoting their superior farming skills thanks to the Japanese overlords. Taiwanese directors would vividly revisit the legacy of this process of cultural annexation in such films as Hou Hsiao-hsien's City of Sadness (1989) and The Puppetmaster (1993), as well as Wu Nien-jen's A Borrowed Life (1994).

== After 1949 ==
Taiwanese cinema grew again after 1949, when the end of the Chinese Civil War brought many filmmakers sympathetic to the Nationalists to Taiwan. Even then, the majority of films were still made in Taiwanese Hokkien and this continued for many years, with over a thousand Taiwanese-language films being made from 1956 to 1981. In 1962, out of a total of 120 films produced, only seven were made in Mandarin; the rest were made in Taiwanese. However, the production of films in Taiwanese began to decline due to a variety of reasons, ranging from limited scope and waning interest for such films, to the Nationalist government's promotion of Standard Chinese in mass media and its deeming of Taiwanese as too "coarse". In 1969, more films were produced in Mandarin than in Taiwanese in the country for the first time. The last movie filmed entirely in Taiwanese was made in 1981.

The 1960s marked the beginning of Taiwan's rapid modernization. The government focused strongly on the economy, industrial development, and education, and in 1963 the Central Motion Picture Corporation (CMPC; see 中影公司) introduced the "Health Realism" melodrama. This film genre was proposed to help build traditional moral values, which were deemed important during the rapid transformation of the nation's socioeconomic structure. During this time, traditional kung fu films as well as romantic melodramas were also quite popular. The author Chiung Yao is especially famous for the movies made in this time period which were based on her widely read romantic novels.

Taiwanese cinema of this period is related to censorship in the Republic of China and propaganda in the Republic of China.

== New Taiwanese Cinema, 1982–1990 ==
By the early 1980s, the popularity of home video made film-watching a widespread activity for the Taiwanese. However, the Taiwanese film industry faced serious challenges, including the entry of Hong Kong films into the Taiwanese market. In order to compete with Hong Kong films, the CMPC began an initiative to support several fresh, young directors. In 1982, the film In Our Time (1982), which featured four young talented directors (Edward Yang, Te-Chen Tao, I-Chen Ko, and Yi Chang), began what would be known as the rejuvenation of Taiwanese cinema: the New Taiwanese Cinema.

In contrast to the melodrama or kung-fu action films of the earlier decades, New Taiwanese Cinema films are known for their realistic, down-to-earth, and sympathetic portrayals of Taiwanese life. These films sought to portray genuine stories of people living either in urban or rural Taiwan, and are often compared stylistically to the films of the Italian neorealism movement. This emphasis on realism was further enhanced by innovative narrative techniques. For example, the conventional narrative structure which builds the drama to a climax was abandoned and the story progressed at the pace as it would in real life.

Due to its honest portrayal of life, New Taiwanese Cinema films examined many of the important issues facing Taiwanese society at the time, such as urbanization, the struggle against poverty, and conflicts with political authority. For instance, Hou Hsiao-hsien's A City of Sadness portrays the tensions and the conflicts between the local Taiwanese and the newly arrived Chinese Nationalist government after the end of the Japanese occupation. Chen Kunhou's 1983 film Growing Up provides a nuanced perspective on the experience of a very young boy, from an ordinary family, getting into progressively more trouble. Edward Yang's Taipei Story (1985) and A Confucian Confusion (1994) talk about the confusion of traditional values and modern materialism among young urbanites in the 1980s and 1990s. His nearly four-hour film A Brighter Summer Day (1991), considered by many to be his masterpiece and the defining work of the New Taiwanese Cinema, deals with Taiwan's struggle in the 1960s to find its identity after the Kuomintang took control of Taiwan and brought numerous Chinese immigrants to the new republic, who expected to return to China once the Communists had been defeated. The New Taiwanese Cinema films therefore create a fascinating chronicle of Taiwan's socio-economic and political transformation in modern times.

== Second New Wave, 1990–2010 ==
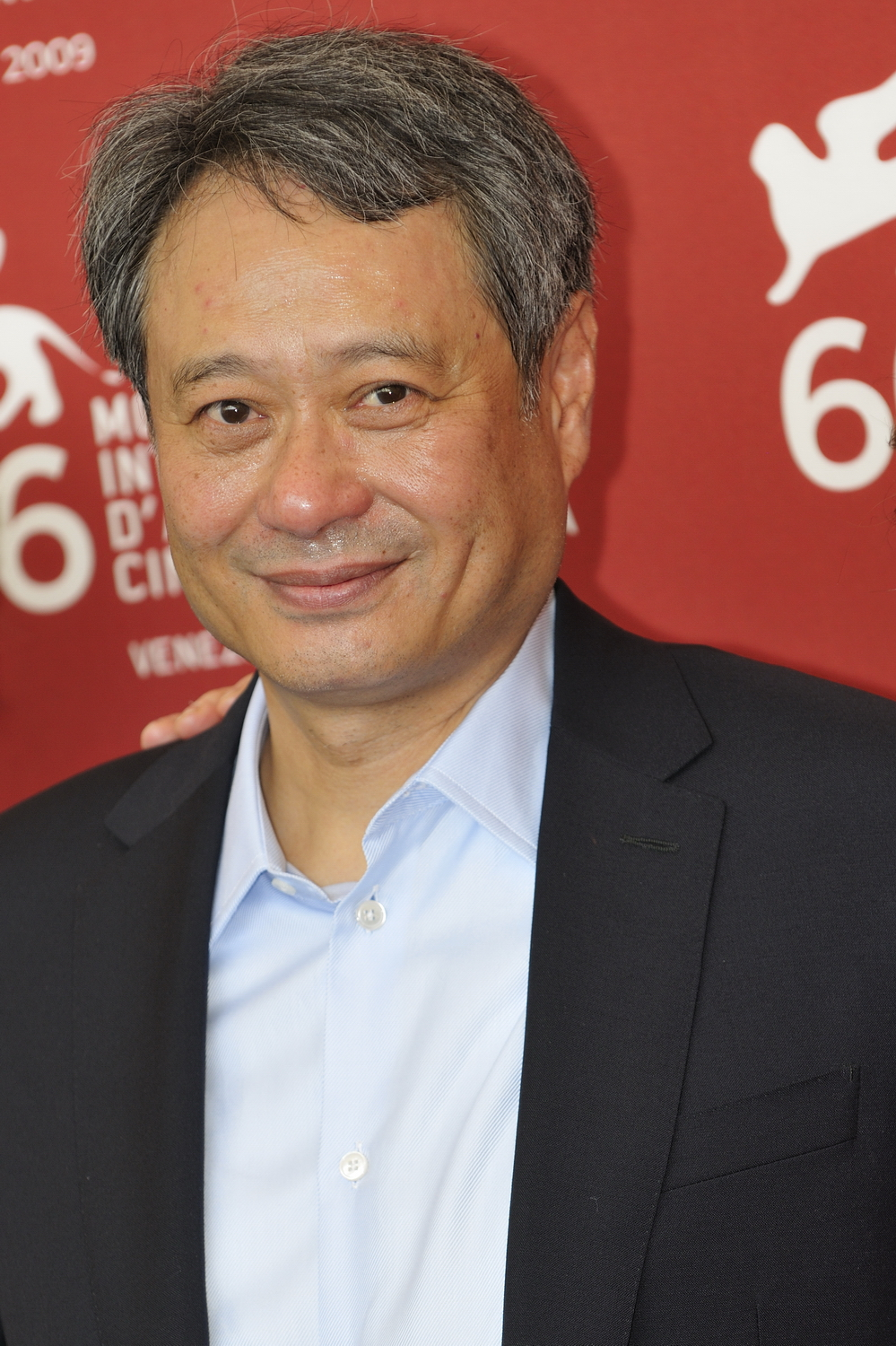
One of Taiwan's leading filmmakers, Ang Lee, in 2009, at the 66th Venice International Film Festival.

The New Taiwanese Cinema gradually gave way to what could be informally called the Second New Wave, which are slightly less serious and more amenable to the populace, although just as committed to portraying the Taiwanese perspective.

For example, Tsai Ming-liang's Vive L'Amour, which won the Golden Lion at the 1994 Venice Film Festival, portrays the isolation, despair, and love of young adults living in the upscale apartments of Taipei. Stan Lai's The Peach Blossom Land (1992) is a tragi-comedy involving two groups of actors rehearsing different plays on the same stage; the masterful juxtaposition and the depth of the play's political and psychological meanings helped it win recognition at festivals in Tokyo and Berlin.

Ang Lee is perhaps the most well-known of the Second New Wave directors. His early films Pushing Hands (1991), The Wedding Banquet (1993), and Eat Drink Man Woman (1994) focus on the generational and cultural conflicts confronting many modern families. His Crouching Tiger, Hidden Dragon (2000) revived the wuxia genre successfully. Although not in the tradition of New Wave or Second New Wave, it is a commercial success which placed Asian films firmly in the international domain. The recent films Eternal Summer (2006), Prince of Tears (2009) and Winds of September (2009) have pushed the boundaries of Taiwanese film-making and broken the island's long-standing taboos about the depiction of controversial subject matter.

Taiwanese cinema faced difficult times competing with Hollywood blockbusters in the late 1990s and early 2000s. Box office for local films dwindled to less than 20 films annually and many Taiwanese viewers preferred watching Hong Kong or Hollywood productions, causing the country's film industry to be dominated by foreign repertoire. Taiwan's film industry went into decline in 1994 and collapsed in 1997 because of the growing popularity of movie piracy. The high box office takings of Cape No. 7 (2008) by Wei Te-sheng and Taiwanese films after 2008 proved that the local film industry had recovered from its slump. Cape No. 7 was so popular in Taiwan that on 1 November 2008 it became its highest grossing domestic film, second in the country's cinematic history to Titanic (1997). It raked in 530 million TWD (US$17.9 million, equivalent to $584,000,000 in 2021 TWD) domestically, setting an all-time box office record for a Taiwanese film, and is currently the highest grossing Taiwanese domestic film of all time. It has won 15 awards to date, such as The Outstanding Taiwanese Film of the Year at the 45th Golden Horse Awards in 2008.

== Revival, 2010–present ==
After the success of Cape No. 7, the Taiwanese movie industry began to recover from a slump that had lasted for about 10 years. Some notable films that led the revival of Taiwanese cinema are Secret (2007), Taipei Exchanges (2010), Monga (2010), Seven Days in Heaven (2010), Night Market Hero (2011), Love (2012). The head of the Government Information Office stated that "2011 will be a brand new year and a new start for Taiwanese films". The director of Cape No. 7, Wei Te-sheng's follow-up movie, Seediq Bale (comprising a part 1 and part 2) was released in September 2011, with part 1 (The Sun Flag) being the 2nd highest grossing Taiwanese domestic film of all time and part 2 (The Rainbow Bridge) being the 7th highest grossing Taiwanese domestic film of all time. It was shown in competition at the 68th Venice International Film Festival and it was selected as a contender for nomination for the 84th Academy Awards for Best Foreign Language Film in 2011 and was one of nine films shortlisted to advance to the next round of voting for nomination.

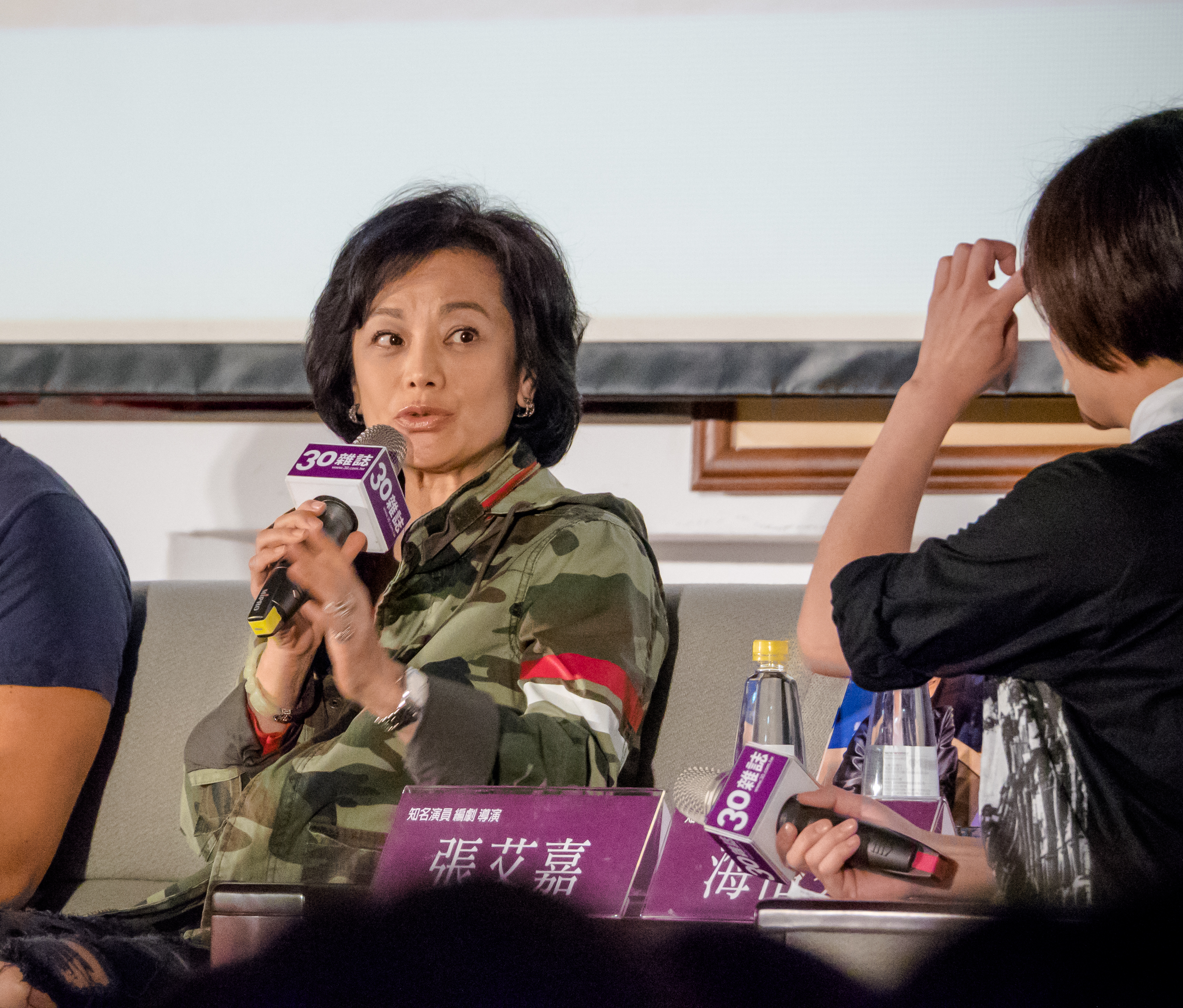
Director, producer, and actress Sylvia Chang has received numerous international awards.

Other notable films include: The Killer Who Never Kills (2011), which is based on a short story in the Killer series written by Giddens Ko. Additionally, the popular 2009 TV series Black & White resulted in two feature films entitled: Black & White Episode I: The Dawn of Assault (2012) (a prequel to the TV series) and Black & White: The Dawn of Justice (2014) (another prequel to the TV series but a sequel to the 2012 film). In 2012, Giddens Ko's romance You Are the Apple of My Eye (2012) earned about NTD 425 million, making it the 4th highest grossing domestic Taiwanese film of all time, followed by Fung Kai's Din Tao: Leader of the Parade (2012) which earned NTD 317 million, making it the 8th highest grossing domestic Taiwanese film of all time. In 2013, Chiu Li-kwan's film David Loman (2013) earned NTD 428 million, making it The 3rd highest grossing domestic Taiwanese film of all time.

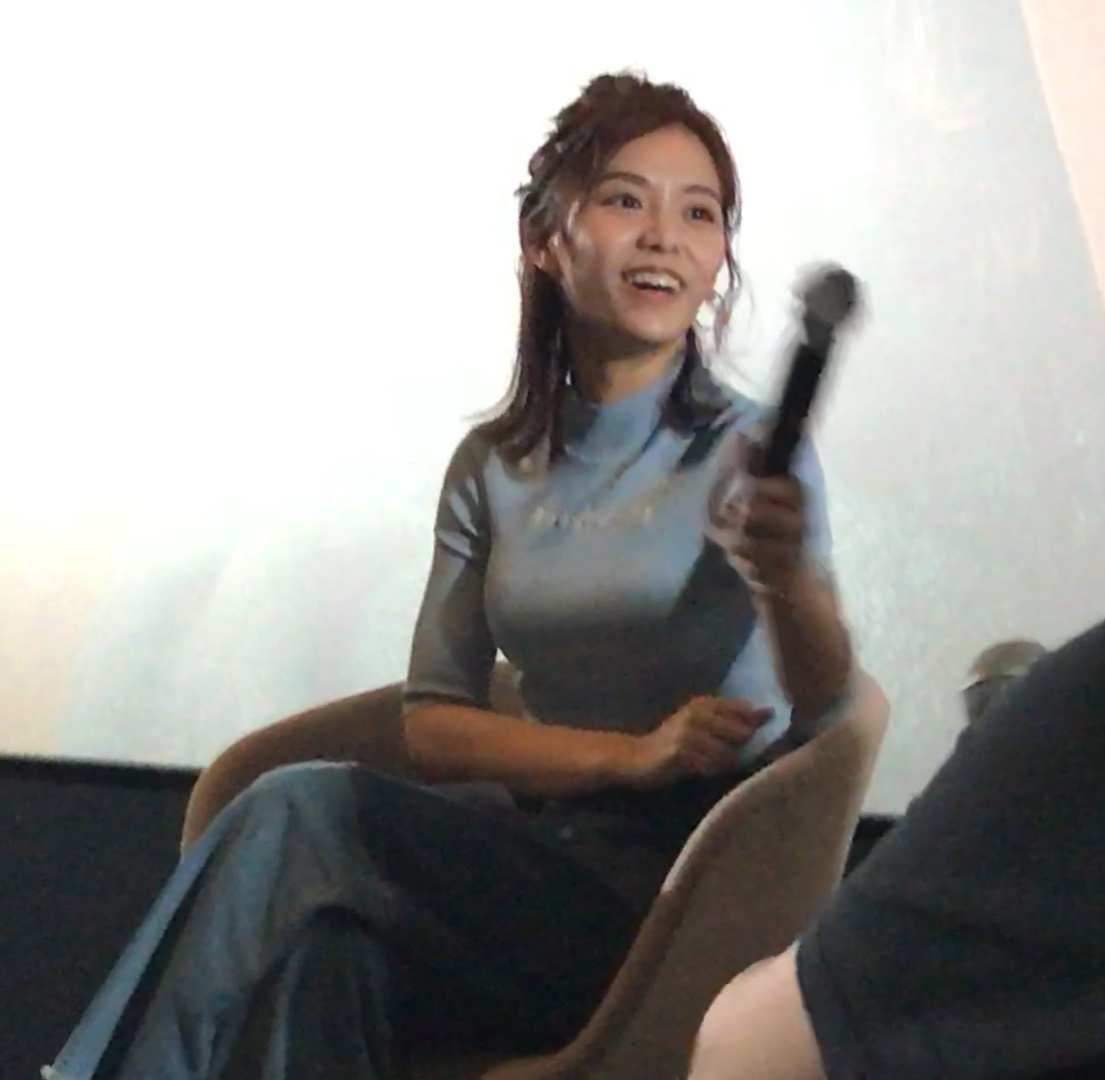
Vivian Sung has starred in several of Taiwan's highest-grossing films, including Our Times and Café. Waiting. Love.

In 2015, female director Yu Shan Chen (a.k.a. Frankie Chen) released a film entitled Our Times (2015), which was the highest-grossing domestic Taiwanese film of the year, grossing over NT$410 million ($17.1 million US dollars), thereby making it the 5th highest grossing domestic Taiwanese film of all time. The film also starred Vivian Sung from another box-office success, Café. Waiting. Love (2014), the 11th highest grossing domestic Taiwanese film of all time. In 2014, Umin Boya directed a baseball film entitled Kano (2014), which ended up grossing over NT$330 million, making it the 6th highest grossing domestic Taiwanese film of all time.

The 9th-15th highest grossing Taiwanese domestic films of all time are, in order: Zone Pro Site (2013) (#9 with NTD 305 million), Ang Lee's Lust, Caution (2007) (#10 with NTD 280 million), Café. Waiting. Love (2014) (#11 with NTD 260 million), Monga (2010) (#12 with NTD 258 million), The Wonderful Wedding (2015) (#13 with NTD 250 million), Beyond Beauty: Taiwan from Above (2013) (#14 with NTD 220 million), and Twa-Tiu-Tiann (2014) (#15 with NTD 210 million).

Taiwanese filmmakers have attempted to cater to the Mainland Chinese market, and any films released on the mainland must comply with censorship that often involves downplaying or removing any indicators that Taiwan is a separate country from China. Such films include Hou Hsiao-hsien's The Assassin (2015), Yu Shan Chen's Our Times (2015), Giddens Ko's You Are the Apple of My Eye (2012), and The Wonderful Wedding (2015). All of these focus on cross-cultural themes marketable on the mainland and other parts of Asia, while purposefully avoiding use of the Taiwanese dialect and common symbols of Taiwanese nationality, like the flag. This is even the case in The Wonderful Wedding, which relies on comedic misunderstandings between the families of a mainland Chinese groom and Taiwanese bride, but attributes them to cultural differences on the regional level not the national level, something that has been described as a 'political whitewash'. Despite this, the film was more successful in Taiwan due to the variety of Taiwanese dialect comedic puns on Mandarin Chinese words. Successful films that focus on Taiwan have therefore predominantly been independent, low-budget, and aimed at the local market, such as John Hsu's Detention, which received five awards including Best Director at the 56th Golden Horse Awards.

=== Profit Sharing ===
Teng Sue-feng used Cape No. 7 as an example to discuss how profit is shared in Taiwan. Teng estimated the revenue to be NTD 520 million, and the production cost to be NTD 50 million. After deducting costs, 60% of the profit goes to movie theaters, and 10% to the distributor. The director gets about NT$140 million.

== Film censorship ==
The first censorship in China under the Beiyang government came in July 1923, when the "Film Censorship Committee of the Jiangsu Provincial Education Association" was established in Jiangsu. It became more pervasive under the Nationalist government.

=== 1949 to 1983 ===
The ROC regained its footing in Taiwan, which was acquired from Japan in 1945 and the 1931 law still applies to the Fujian islands of Kinmen and Matsu. In 1955 (Chinese: 電影檢查法-中華民國44年), 1956 (Chinese: 電影檢查法-中華民國45年), and 1958 (Chinese: 電影檢查法-中華民國47年), four more amendments to the law ensued without revising the main criteria. The law was renamed the Motion Picture Act (Chinese: 電影法-中華民國72年) in November 1983, and expanded the censorship criteria to include the following:

- Hurts national interests or racial pride
- Violates national policy or government ordinance
- Agitates others to commit crimes or disobey laws
- Jeopardizes teenager or children's health both physically or psychologically
- Disrupts public order or impedes good morality
- Advocates ridiculous heresy or misleads public opinion
- Defames persons of virtue from the past or distorts historical facts

Article 30 of the 1983 law lowered the age cutoff line from 12 to 6 to dictate whether the viewing should be restricted or not.

=== 1983 to the present ===
KMT practiced martial law until July 1987. After lifting it, the Executive Yuan, or through its now dissolved Government Information Office (GIO), promulgated regulations to carry out the said revised law starting in 1987 (Chinese: 中華民國七十六年八月三十一日行政院臺七十六聞字第二○二○八號函核定) and 1988 (Chinese: 中華民國七十七年一月一日行政院新聞局（77）銘影二字第○○○○二號令發布). The then regulations revised the motion picture rating system, classifying films into three categories (General Audience/Parental Guidance/Restricted) based on age. The categories were expanded into four (General Audience/Protected/Parental Guidance/Restricted) in 1994 (Chinese: 中華民國八十三年四月一日行政院新聞局(83)強影二字第○四一五八號令發布修正第二條、第三條、第五條至第十一條條文).

The film law rephrased the censorship requirement in June 2015. To control the rating system requirement from a legislative perspective, article 9 of the new Motion Picture Act (Chinese: 電影法-中華民國104年), promulgated by the Legislative Yuan, maintains that motion pictures and their advertisements shall not be screened if not granted a rating by the central competent authority which shall convene a rating commission to rate films. Members of the commission shall be representatives of government agencies, and scholars and experts having academic or practical experience in related fields. The commission's conclusions shall be made public and clear rationales for ratings given be listed. Article 10 maintains if motion pictures and their advertisements violate restrictions or prohibitions laid out in law, the central competent authority shall not grant a rating. The Ministry of Culture established by the Executive Yuan further specifies that not more than one third of the committee members can come from the Bureau of Audiovisual and Music Industry Development.

The rating system was expanded into five categories on October 16, 2015, per regulations (Chinese: 中華民國104年10月16日文影字第10420350091號令修正發布) drawn up in accordance with the Motion Picture Act.

The revised Taiwan motion picture rating system which took effect from October 16, 2015.
- 0+: General Audience (Chinese: 普遍級 or 普) – Viewing is permitted for audiences of all ages.
- 6+: Protected (Chinese: 保護級 or 護) – Viewing is not permitted for children under 6; children between 6 and 11 shall be accompanied and given guidance by parents, teachers, seniors, or adult relatives or friends.
- 12+: Parental Guidance 12 (Chinese: 輔導十二歲級 or 輔12) – Viewing is not permitted for children under 12.
- 15+: Parental Guidance 15 (Chinese: 輔導十五歲級 or 輔15) – Viewing is not permitted for those under 15.
- 18+: Restricted (Chinese: 限制級 or 限) – Viewing is not permitted for those under 18.

Article 9 of the regulations specifically mentions the Restricted rating will be issued under the following scenario:

Where the sale or use of illegal drugs, robbery, kidnapping, killing, or other illegal activities are detailed in the plot; where there is concern that such activity could be mimicked; where terrorism, bloody events, violence, or perversion are particularly vivid and could still be acceptable to persons over age 18; where sexual imagery or innuendo is portrayed vividly in animation, images, language, text, dialogue, or sound, but does not elicit feelings of shame or disgust in persons over the age of 18.

Article 235 of ROC's Criminal Code also penalizes the distribution, broadcasts, sale, publicly displays of obscene video record.

== Notable directors, actors and actresses ==
- Sylvia Chang
- Chen Kuo-fu
- Chang Chen
- Chin Han
- Charlie Chin Hsiang-lin
- Jay Chou
- Chu Ke-liang
- Gwei Lun-mei
- Hou Hsiao-hsien
- Hsu Feng
- King Hu
- Sibelle Hu
- Richie Jen
- Takeshi Kaneshiro
- Cynthia Khan
- Ang Lee
- Li Han-hsiang
- Tom Lin Shu-yu
- Ruby Lin
- Brigitte Lin
- Jimmy Lin
- Joan Lin
- Rene Liu
- Sihung Lung
- Shu Qi
- Alec Su
- Tsai Ming-liang
- Wei Te-sheng
- Jacklyn Wu
- Nicky Wu
- Wu Nien-jen
- Jerry Yan
- Yang Kuei-Mei
- Edward Yang

== Awards ==
- Golden Horse Film Festival and Awards (GHA)
- Taipei Film Festival and Awards
- Golden Harvest Awards for Outstanding Short Films
- South Taiwan Film Festival

== See also ==
- List of cinemas in Taiwan
- Chinese Culture and Movie Center
- Cinema of the world
- Culture of Taiwan
- Golden Horse Film Festival and Awards (Taipei)
- List of Taiwanese actresses
- List of Taiwanese submissions for the Academy Award for Best International Feature Film

== Bibliography ==
- Baskett, Michael (2008). The Attractive Empire: Transnational Film Culture in Imperial Japan. Honolulu: University of Hawai'i Press. ISBN 978-0-8248-3223-0.
