= Growing Up (1983 film) =

- Film poster
- Directed by: Chen Kun-hou
- Written by: Hou Hsiao-hsien; Chu T’ien-wen; Ding Yah-ming; Hsu Shu-Chen
- Produced by: Hou Hsiao-Hsien
- Starring: Doze Niu
- Cinematography: Chen Kun-hou
- Edited by: Liao Ching-sung
- Music by: Lee Tsung-Sheng
- Production company: Central Motion Picture Corporation
- Distributed by: Central Motion Picture Corporation
- Release date: 29 January 1983 (Taiwan)
- Running time: 100 minutes
- Country: Taiwan
- Language: Mandarin

Growing Up (Chinese: 小畢的故事; pinyin: Xiǎobì De Gùshì) is a 1983 drama film by Taiwanese filmmaker Chen Kunhou. The screenplay was the first collaboration between Hou Hsiao-hsien and Chu T’ien-wen. The film made the young star, Doze Niu, "a pop icon and tagged him with a rebellious image."

Growing Up was the film that "first attracted broad critical and popular attention to the movement" known as New Taiwan Cinema. It "established some of the movement's key stylistic approaches and narrative concerns, with its subdued manner in relating the story of an adolescent boy grappling with everyday pangs amid Taiwan's fraught provincial context." The film was selected as the Taiwanese entry for the Best Foreign Language Film at the 56th Academy Awards, but was not accepted as a nominee.

== See also ==
- List of submissions to the 56th Academy Awards for Best Foreign Language Film
- List of Taiwanese submissions for the Academy Award for Best Foreign Language Film
