= Chen Kun-hou =

Taiwanese film director and cinematographer

Chen Kun-hou (陳坤厚) is a veteran cinematographer, who started his career in the 1960s. He won his first best cinematography award at the Golden Horse Awards in 1978 for He Never Gives Up (汪洋中的一條船), directed by Li Hsing. In the early 1980s he began to direct his own films in collaboration with Hou Hsiao-hsien. After series of urban comedies, he made quite a few representative films of the Taiwan New Cinema, such as Growing Up (1983), which won him the best director award at the Golden Horse Awards, His Matrimony (結婚; 1985), which won him the second best cinematography award at Golden Horse Awards, My Favorite Season (最想念的季節; 1985), and Osmanthus Alley (1987). He was awarded for his life achievements in Taiwan cinema at the 60th Golden Horse Awards in 2023.

== Career ==
Chen Kun-hou was born in Taichung in 1939. He was enrolled in Central Motion Picture Corporation in 1962 to learn cinematography. His uncle Lai Cheng-ying was an established cinematographer there at CMPC already. He started as an apprentice and was promoted to cinematographer in 1971. His first film as a cinematographer is Story of Mother (母親三十歲; 1973), in which his cinematography adds a tragic-realistic tone to this highly acclaimed film by Sung Cun-shou (宋存壽). He worked with Li Hsing for many of his films in the late 1970s, including He Never Gives Up, Good Morning Taipei (早安台北; 1979), The Story of A Small Town (1979), and My Native Land (1980). He won his first best cinematography award at the Golden Horse Awards for his cinematography in He Never Gives Up in 1978.

Starting from 1979, Chen Kun-hou and Hou Hsiao-hsien teamed up to produce six romantic urban comedy films by taking turns to be the director, four of which directed by Chen are Spring in Autumn (天涼好個秋; 1980), Lover on the Wave (我踏浪而來; 1980), Longing (蹦蹦一串心; 1981), and Six Is Company (俏如彩蝶飛飛飛; 1982) and the other two directed by Hou are Cute Girl (1980) and Cheerful Wind (1982). These films copied the successful formula of Chiung Yao's literary romantic films to cast popular stars, such as Chin Han, Kenny Bee, Joan Lin, Fong Fei-fei, and Shen Yan (沈雁), to present light-hearted urban romance accompanied by namesake theme songs and other interlude songs. Two of the six films were arranged to premiere in theaters during the Lunar New Year, Cute Girl and Cheerful Wind, both project the new year blessing of “May you be happy and prosperous” (恭喜發財) at the end of the film on the screen.

In 1982, Chen Kun-hou, Hou Hsiao-hsien, Hsu Shu-zhen (許淑真), and Chang Hua-kun (張華坤) formed Evergreen Film Company (萬年青影業公司). The company’s first film Growing Up, a collaboration with CMPC and directed by Chen, was a big success at the box office (NT$6,309,066 in Taipei City), and it won the best feature film, best director, and best script at the Golden Horse Awards in 1983. The company also produced The Boys from Fengkuei (風櫃來的人; 1983), directed by Hou Hsiao-hsien with Chen as the cinematographer. The film was Hou’s important first film with artistic consciousness of film form, but it was also the last film he and Chen collaborated on.

After Chen Kun-hou parted ways with Hou Hsiao-hsien, he was productive as a key director of the Taiwan New Cinema and made six films, mostly adaptations of literary works, from 1984 to 1988, including Out of The Blue (小爸爸的天空; 1984), His Matrimony, My Favorite Season, Drifters (流浪少年路; 1986), Osmanthus Alley, and My Mother's Teahouse (1988). He won another best cinematography award at the Golden Horse Awards in 1985 for His Matrimony.

Starting from 1989, Chen Kun-hou began to be involved in TV productions, especially documentaries, such as Feiyue Qingchun (飛越青春; 1992) and The Story of Confucius (孔子的故事; 1993). He later went to China and helped Chow Ling-Gong (周令剛) establish Fee Tang Stellar Movie-Making Base (飛騰影視城; now Mega Jincheng Movie-Making Base) in Beijing. He directed three more feature films from 2008 to 2012, two of them are made in China: Twin Daggers (雙鏢; 2008) and The Triangle Land (三角地/幸福三角地; 2012) and one Taiwan production: Colorful Mind (新魯冰花：孩子的天空; 2009), a remake of The Dull-Ice Flower (魯冰花; 1989), a popular film based on the namesake novel by Chung Chao-cheng.

== Filmography ==
Director
Year	Chinese title	English title	Notes
1980	《天涼好個秋》	Spring in Autumn	
1980	《我踏浪而來》	Lover on the Wave	
1981	《蹦蹦一串心》	Longing	
1982	《俏如彩蝶飛飛飛》	Six Is Company	
1983	《小畢的故事》	Growing Up	
1984	《小爸爸的天空》	Out of the Blue	
1985	《結婚》	His Matrimony	
1985	《最想念的季節》	My Favorite Season	
1986	《流浪少年路》	Drifters	
1987	《桂花巷》	Osmanthus Alley	
1988	《春秋茶室》	My Mother's Teahouse	
1992	《飛躍青春》		documentary
1993	《孔子的故事》	Confucious	documentary
2008	《雙鏢》	Twin Daggers	
2009	《新魯冰花：孩子的天空》	Colorful Mind	
2012	《三角地》/《幸福三角地》	The Triangle Land	

Cinematographer
Year	Chinese title	English title	Notes
1969	《銀姑》	Silver Maid	
1971	《精忠報國》	The Decisive Battle	
1973	《母親三十歲》	Story of Mother	
1975	《星期六的約會》	A Saturday Date	
1977	《煙水寒》	The Glory of The Sunset	
1978	《煙波江上》	Love on a Foggy River	
1978	《汪洋中的一條船》	He Never Gives Up	
1978	《碎心蘭》		
1979	《悲之秋》	A Sorrowful Wedding	
1979	《早安台北》	Good Morning, Taipei	
1979	《小城故事》	The Story of a Small Town	
1979	《拒絕聯考的小子》	The Boy Who Refused to Take the Entrance Examination	
1980	《西風的故鄉》	The Blind Love	
1980	《天涼好個秋》	Spring in Autumn	
1980	《原鄉人》	My Native Land	
1980	《我踏浪而來》	Lover on the Wave	
1981	《就是溜溜的她》	Cute Girls	
1981	《歡喜冤家》	Intimate But Quarrelsome	
1981	《蹦蹦一串心》	Longing	
1982	《俏如彩蝶飛飛飛》	Six Is Company	
1982	《在那河畔青草青》	Green Green Grass of Home	
1982	《風兒踢踏踩》	Cheerful Wind	
1983	《風櫃來的人》	The Boys from Fengkuei	
1983	《小畢的故事》	Growing Up	
1983	《兒子的大玩偶》	The Sandwich Man	
1984	《冬冬的假期》	A Summer at Grandpa's	
1984	《小爸爸的天空》	Out of the Blue	
1985	《結婚》	His Matrimony	
1985	《最想念的季節》	My Favorite Season	
1988	《春秋茶室》	My Mother's Teahouse	
1988	《海峽兩岸》	People Between Two CHINA	
1990	《祝福》	Promising Miss Bowie	
1992	《飛躍青春》		documentary

== Awards and honors ==
Year	Award	Category	Film	Result	Ref.
1978	15th Golden Horse Awards	Best Cinematography	He Never Gives Up	Won	
1979	16th Golden Horse Awards	Best Cinematography	The Story of a Small Town	Nominated	
1983	20th Golden Horse Awards	Best Director	Growing Up	Won	
1984	21st Golden Horse Awards	Best Cinematography	The Boys from Fengkuei	Nominated	
1985	22nd Golden Horse Awards	Best Cinematography	His Matrimony	Won	
1985	22nd Golden Horse Awards	Best Director	His Matrimony	Nominated	
2023	60th Golden Horse Awards	Lifetime Achievement		Won	
