= Chu Tʻien-wen =

Taiwanese writer

- Chu at the 2008 Taipei International Book Exhibition
- Born: 24 August 1956 (age 70); Taipei, Taiwan
- Education: Tamkang University (BA)
- Relatives: Chu Hsi-ning, father; Liu Musha, mother; Chu Tʻien-hsin, sister
- Writing career
- Language: Chinese

Chinese name
- Chinese: 朱天文
Transcriptions
Standard Mandarin
- Hanyu Pinyin: Zhū Tiānwén
- Wade–Giles: Chu^{1} T'ien^{1}-wen^{2}

Chu Tʻien-wen (Chinese: 朱天文; born 24 August 1956) is a Taiwanese fiction writer. Chu is perhaps best known for writing the screenplays for most Hou Hsiao-hsien films. She is the recipient of the 2015 Newman Prize for Chinese Literature.

Her father Chu Hsi-ning and younger sister Chu Tʻien-hsin are also famous writers.

== Biography ==
Chu Tʻien-wen was born in Taipei, Taiwan. She was born to one of the most prestigious literary family in contemporary Taiwan. She is the daughter of Chu Hsi-ning and the older sister of Chu Tʻien-hsin. Her teacher was Hu Lancheng, and she was also greatly influenced by Eileen Chang. Chu weaves an eclectic tapestry of culture through the personal history and musings of her mentor. Chu published her first novel in 1972. In 1983, Chu adapted the award-winning novel "Growing Up" into a screenplay for the screen. Besides winning the Best Adapted Screenplay Award of the 20th Golden Horse Award, Chu also co-produced the soundtrack.

While attending Tamkang University, Chu served as the chief editor of The Threes journal (Sansan jikan 三三集刊), The Threes magazine (Sansan zazhi 三三雜誌), and co-founded The Threes Bookstore Publisher (Sansan shufang 三三書坊) with her sister and friends. In 1985, she wrote the screenplay "The Time to Live and the Time to Die" and won the best original screenplay award in the 22nd Taiwan Golden Horse Award. Some of her notable novels are Fin-de-Siècle Splendour (世紀末的華麗, 1990), Notes of a Desolate Man (荒人手記, 1994), and Witch's Brew (巫言, 2008). She wrote many of the scripts for the famous Taiwanese director Hou Hsiao-hsien. Her screenwriting credits include movies like Taipei Story, The Puppetmaster, Goodbye South, Goodbye, Millennium Mambo, City of Sadness 悲情城市 (1989), and many more.

Chu was named the winner of the 2015 Newman Prize for Chinese Literature for Fin-de-Siècle Splendour, making her the first female writer to win the award. When Chu came to the University of Oklahoma to receive the Newman Prize in early March 2015, she participated in the Chinese Cinema Salon funded by the Presidential Dream Course on Chinese Cinema. Chu has been awarded Best Screenplay at the international Venice Film Festival and the Tokyo International Film Festival.

== Works translated to English ==
| Year | Chinese title | Translated English title | Translator(s) |
|---|---|---|---|
| 1986 | 炎夏之都 | "The Long Hot Summer" | Ellen Lai-shan Yeung |
| 1986 | 炎夏之都 | "A City of Hot Summer" | Michelle Yeh |
| 1988 | 柴師父 | "Master Chai" | Michelle Yeh |
| 1989 | 肉身菩薩 | "Boddhisattva Incarnate" | Fran Martin |
| 1990 | 世紀末的華麗 | "Fin de Siècle Splendour" | Eva Hung |
| 1994 | 荒人手記 | Notes of a Desolate Man | Howard Goldblatt, Sylvia Li-chun Lin |
| 2006 | 巫言 | "Witch's Brew" | Howard Goldblatt, Sylvia Li-chun Lin |
| 2015 | 我們有義務成為另一些人 | "We All Change into Somebody Else" | Ping Zhu |

== Filmography ==
=== Films ===
| Year | English title | Chinese title | Director | Notes |
|---|---|---|---|---|
| 1983 | Growing Up | 小畢的故事 | Chen Kunhou | co-wrote with Hou Hsiao-hsien, Ding Yah-ming and Hsu Shu-chen |
| 1983 | The Boys from Fengkuei | 風櫃來的人 | Hou Hsiao-hsien | |
| 1984 | A Summer at Grandpa's | 冬冬的假期 | Hou Hsiao-hsien | |
| 1984 | Out of the Blue | 小爸爸的天空 | Chen Kunhou | co-wrote with Wu Nien-jen |
| 1985 | My Favorite Season | 最想念的季節 | Chen Kunhou | co-wrote with Hou Hsiao-hsien, Ding Yah-ming and Hsu Shu-chen |
| 1985 | The Matrimony | 結婚 | Chen Kunhou | co-wrote with Ding Yah-ming and Hsu Shu-chen |
| 1985 | Taipei Story | 青梅竹馬 | Edward Yang | co-wrote with Hou Hsiao-hsien |
| 1985 | The Time to Live and the Time to Die | 童年往事 | Hou Hsiao-hsien | |
| 1986 | Dust in the Wind | 戀戀風塵 | Hou Hsiao-hsien | co-wrote with Wu Nien-jen |
| 1986 | Drifters | 流浪少年路 | Chen Kunhou | co-wrote with Ding Yah-ming and Hsu Shu-chen |
| 1987 | Daughter of the Nile | 尼羅河女兒 | Hou Hsiao-hsien | |
| 1989 | A City of Sadness | 悲情城市 | Hou Hsiao-hsien | co-wrote with Wu Nien-jen |
| 1993 | The Puppetmaster | 戲夢人生 | Hou Hsiao-hsien | co-wrote with Wu Nien-jen |
| 1995 | Good Men, Good Women | 好男好女 | Hou Hsiao-hsien | |
| 1996 | Goodbye South, Goodbye | 南國再見，南國 | Hou Hsiao-hsien | co-wrote with Jack Kao and Lim Giong |
| 1998 | Flowers of Shanghai | 海上花 | Hou Hsiao-hsien | based on The Sing-song Girls of Shanghai |
| 2001 | Millennium Mambo | 千禧曼波 | Hou Hsiao-hsien | |
| 2003 | Café Lumière | 咖啡時光 | Hou Hsiao-hsien | |
| 2005 | Three Times | 最好的時光 | Hou Hsiao-hsien | |
| 2015 | The Assassin | 刺客聶隱娘 | Hou Hsiao-hsien | historical film, co-wrote with niece Hsieh Hai-meng and Ah Cheng |
| 2020 | Unfulfilled Dreams | 願未央 | Chu T'ien-wen | Documentary |

=== TV series (incomplete) ===
- 1982 Guarding Sunlight, Guarding You (守著陽光守著你)?
- 1989 Sweet Baby (甜蜜寶貝)

== Film awards ==
| Year | # | Award | Category | Film | Result |
|---|---|---|---|---|---|
| 1983 | 20th | Golden Horse Awards | Best Adapted Screenplay | Growing Up | Won |
| 1984 | 21st | Golden Horse Awards | Best Adapted Screenplay | A Summer at Grandpa's | Nominated |
| 1985 | 22nd | Golden Horse Awards | Best Original Screenplay | The Time to Live and the Time to Die | Won |
| 1989 | 26th | Golden Horse Awards | Best Original Screenplay | A City of Sadness | Nominated |
| 1995 | 32nd | Golden Horse Awards | Best Adapted Screenplay | Good Men, Good Women | Won |
| 2005 | 42nd | Golden Horse Awards | Best Original Screenplay | Three Times | Nominated |
| 2015 | 52nd | Golden Horse Awards | Best Adapted Screenplay | The Assassin | Nominated |
| 2016 | 13th | International Cinephile Society Awards | Best Adapted Screenplay | The Assassin | Nominated |
