= 31st Golden Horse Awards =

Award ceremony for Chinese-language films of 1993 and 1994

- Date: December 10, 1994
- Site: Sun Yat-sen Memorial Hall, Taipei, Taiwan
- Hosted by: Regina Tsang, Kenny Bee and Chang Shih
- Preshow hosts: Ho Tu-lin and Chen Hsiao-hsuan
- Organized by: Taipei Golden Horse Film Festival Executive Committee

Highlights
- Best Feature Film: Vive L'Amour
- Best Director: Tsai Ming-liang; Vive L'Amour
- Best Actor: Tony Leung Chiu-wai; Chungking Express
- Best Actress: Joan Chen; Red Rose White Rose
- Most awards: Red Rose White Rose (5)
- Most nominations: A Confucian Confusion (12)

Television in Taiwan
- Channel: TTV

The 31st Golden Horse Awards (Mandarin:第31屆金馬獎) took place on December 10, 1994 at the Sun Yat-sen Memorial Hall in Taipei, Taiwan.

== Winners and nominees ==
Winners are listed first and highlighted in boldface.

**Best Feature Film**: **Vive L'Amour**; Eat Drink Man Woman; A Confucian Confusion; A Borrowed Life; Red Rose White Rose; Chungking Express	**Best Documentary Film**: **Introduction to Marionette Play by Grandpa**; Woman of Tu'ban; Taiwan Terns
**Best Animation** -
**Best Director**: **Tsai Ming-liang — Vive L'Amour**; Stanley Kwan — Red Rose White Rose; Wong Kar-wai — Chungking Express; Edward Yang — A Confucian Confusion	**Best Leading Actor**: **Tony Leung Chiu-wai — Chungking Express**; Tsai Chen-nan — A Borrowed Life; Chang Shih — The Wooden Man's Bride; Lee Kang-sheng — Vive L'Amour
**Best Leading Actress**: **Joan Chen — Red Rose White Rose**; Ni Shu-chun — A Confucian Confusion; Veronica Yip — Red Rose White Rose; Faye Wong — Chungking Express	**Best Supporting Actor**: **Wang Bosen — A Confucian Confusion**; Chen Chao-jung — Vive L'Amour; Eric Kot — In Between; Jordan Chan — Twenty Something
**Best Supporting Actress**: **Elaine Jin — A Confucian Confusion**; Gua Ah-leh — Eat Drink Man Woman; Farini Cheung — Twenty Something; Law Koon-lan — Over the Rainbow, Under the Skirt	**Golden Horse Award for Best Original Film Song**: **多桑 by Tsai Chen-nan - A Borrowed Life**; 追 by Leslie Cheung - He's a Woman, She's a man; I have a Date with Spring by Alice Lau - I have a date with Spring
**Audience Choice Award**: **A Borrowed Life**	**Jury's Special Award -** **Honourable Animation Production Award**: **Zen Taipei Ah-Kuan**
**Outstanding Producer Award**: **Hsu Li-kong**	**Lifetime Achievement Award**: **Tung Yueh-chuan**
