= Dust in the Wind (film) =

- Theatrical release poster
- Traditional Chinese: 戀戀風塵
- Simplified Chinese: 恋恋风尘
- Literal meaning: deep love, windblown dust
- Hanyu Pinyin: liàn liàn fēngchén
- Hokkien POJ: loân loân hong-tîn
- Directed by: Hou Hsiao-hsien
- Written by: Chu Tʻien-wen; Wu Nien-jen
- Produced by: Hui San-Chi
- Starring: Wang Chien-wen; Xin Shufen; Li Tian-lu
- Cinematography: Mark Lee Ping-bing
- Edited by: Liao Ching-sung
- Music by: Chen Ming-chang
- Production company: Central Motion Picture Corporation
- Distributed by: Central Motion Picture Corporation
- Release date: May 9, 1986 (Taiwan)
- Running time: 109 minutes
- Country: Taiwan
- Languages: Taiwanese; Mandarin

Dust in the Wind (Chinese: 戀戀風塵; pinyin: Liàn liàn fēngchén) is a 1986 Taiwanese film directed by Hou Hsiao-hsien. It is based on co-screenwriter Wu Nien-jen's own experiences, and is the first of a trilogy of Hou and Wu's collaborations, the others being A City of Sadness (1989) and The Puppetmaster (1993).

The film depicts the bittersweet love story of two village sweethearts, Ah Yuan and Ah Yun, who left hometown Jiufen to work in Taipei city together after graduating from junior high school. It is highly acclaimed for Hou Hsiao-hsien's nostalgic depiction of Taiwan's rural past, when trains were the main transportation in the 1970s. The soundtrack by Chen Ming-chang and the cinematography by Lee Ping-bing won the Best Cinematography and Music Award in Festival des 3 Continents in 1987.

== Plot ==
Ah Yuan and Ah Yun are childhood sweethearts living in Jiufen, a rural town nestled in the hills of northern Taiwan. Their fathers work as coal miners, and the two grow up inseparable, traveling to school together daily by train and walking home along the railway and winding uphill roads. After finishing high school, Ah Yuan moves to Taipei to work at a printing shop. A year later, Ah Yun follows him to the city and takes a job at a tailor shop. Life proves challenging for both, as Ah Yuan barely makes ends meet and has his motorbike stolen, while Ah Yun struggles with intense homesickness. They find comfort in friends who likewise come from the countryside.

Ah Yuan is later drafted into the Republic of China Army and stationed at the Kinmen Defense Command. He writes letters to Ah Yun faithfully, and she replies regularly—until one day, her letters stop, and his are returned unopened. Ah Yuan is left heartbroken when his younger brother writes to tell him that Ah Yun has married a postman without informing her parents, greatly upsetting her mother. Ah Yuan's mother, also heartbroken, has gifted Ah Yun a ring originally meant for her engagement with Ah Yuan.

Ah Yuan eventually recovers from the heartbreak. At the end of his two-year service, he returns to Jiufen wearing a shirt Ah Yun had made for him. At home, he finds his mother peacefully asleep and contently listens to his grandfather's familiar grumbles about the typhoon ruining the sweet potato harvest.

== Cast ==
Actor	Character	Notes
Wang Chien-wen	Xie Wen Yuan (Wan, Yuan in Taiwanese)	Huen's boyfriend
Hsin Shu-fen	Jiang Su Yun (Huen, Yun in Taiwanese)	Wan's girlfriend
Li Tian-lu	Wan's grandfather	
Lawrence Ko	Mrs. Lin's son	
Chen Shu-fang	Huen's mother	
Yang Li-yin	A Ying	Huen's colleagues in the textile factory
Mei Fang	A Qing	Wan's mother
Lin Yang	Wan's father	
Wu Pin Nan	The owner of shipping company	
Danny Teng	chief counselor	Chief counselor of Kinmen Defense Command

== Production ==
The film features the master of glove puppetry Li Tian-lu (李天祿) in the role of the grandfather. Li became an iconic actor in Hou's films after he took a role in this film. This film is Li Tian-lu's debut film performance, and it is also Chen Ming-Chang 's first film soundtrack.

Wang Chien-wen, who played Ah Yuan, joined the production when he was about to graduate from the Department of Theatre Arts of Chinese Culture University in 1985. This is also the only film he ever performed in his life. Unfortunately, Wang died early in 2014.

Dust in the Wind portrays the urbanization of Taiwan in the 1970s, when more and more youngsters left their hometowns to find jobs in the city. The film touches upon social issues such as violence in the workplace some of them have to endure. It also portrays the miners complaining about the ill treatment of the mining company and proposing to go for a strike.

Hou Hsiao-hsien and Wu Nian-chen jointly wrote a letter to James Soong, director of the Information Bureau of the Executive Yuan, requesting his help to obtain assistance from the military department for the scenes involving Ah Yuan’s military service. Central Motion Picture Corporation also submitted the script and applied for military support to go to Kinmen for on-site shooting. However, the military department rejected the request due to the concerns that the plot of Ah Yuan being ditched by his sweetheart during military service might have a negative impact on the soldiers. The scenes in Kinmen thus had to be shot in Xiangshan in Taipei.

The outdoor screening of Beautiful Duckling in the village in this film is considered to be a deliberate tribute to Li Hsing, who is the director of this representative film of Healthy Realism (健康寫實).

The location of the tailor’s shop where Huen worked after arriving in Taipei is now the Red House Theater in Ximending, Taipei. According to Chu T’ien-wen', in the original script Ah Yun was to work in a restaurant, but when Chu T’ien-wen scouted the location at Ximending (西門町), she found that a costume shop very nostalgic, so she changed the script and the film finally was shot in this place.

Hou Hsiao-hsien's 1996 film Goodbye South, Goodbye opens with a return to the Shifen Station where Wan and Huen once stepped on the railway tracks. This time the camera is placed at the rear of the train instead of at the head as in Dust in the Wind, thus conveying a sense of farewell.

Jiufen, once a popular town for gold mining, became one of the most well known tourist attractions in Taiwan because of this film and City of Sadness (1989), whose story is also set here. Hou even regretted that he ever made City of Sadness and caused the ruin of the quiet small town, which was captured in Dust in the Wind.
