= Good Men, Good Women =

1995 Taiwanese film by Hou Hsiao-hsien

- DVD cover
- Chinese: 好男好女
- Literal meaning: Good Men, Good Women
- Hanyu Pinyin: hǎo nán hǎo nǚ
- Directed by: Hou Hsiao-hsien
- Written by: Chu T'ien-wen
- Produced by: Katshuhiro Mizuno
- Starring: Annie Yi; Lim Giong; Jack Kao
- Cinematography: Chen Hwai-en
- Edited by: Liao Ching-sung
- Music by: Chen Hwai-en; Jiang Hsiao-Wen
- Distributed by: Fox Lorber (US DVD)
- Release date: 1995
- Running time: 108 minutes
- Countries: Japan; Taiwan
- Languages: Taiwanese Minnan; Mandarin; Japanese; Cantonese

Good Men, Good Women (Chinese: 好男好女) is a 1995 Taiwanese film directed by Hou Hsiao-hsien, starring Annie Yi, Lim Giong, and Jack Kao. It is the last installment in the trilogy that began with A City of Sadness (1989) and continued with The Puppetmaster (1993). Like its predecessors, it deals with the complicated issues of Taiwanese history and national identity.

== Plot ==
The film depicts the real-life story of Chiang Bi-yu (Annie Yi). In the 1940s, she and her newlywed husband, Chung Hao-tung (Lim Giong), head to mainland China to join the anti-Japanese resistance. During the war, she is forced to give her baby up for adoption. After the war they return to Taiwan, as Chung is to distribute a communist paper called The Enlightenment. However, as the Korean War deepens, Chiang Kai-shek's Kuomintang government intensifies the White Terror and Chung is executed.

The film consists of three intermingling storylines and scattered throughout the film are interludes of an actress (also played by Yi) who prepares for the role of Chiang Bi-yu, and also confronts her deceased boyfriend's past.

== Cast ==
- Annie Yi - Liang Ching / Chiang Bi-yu
- Lim Giong - Chung Hao-tung
- Jack Kao - Ah Wel
- Hsi Hsiang - Ah Hsi
- Lan Bo-chow - Hsiao Dao-ying
- Lu Li-chin - Mrs. Hslao
- Tsai Chen-nan - Ah Nan
- Vicky Wei - Liang Ching's Sister

== Awards ==
Good Men, Good Women won the Golden Horse Award for best director (1995), and was shown in the Cannes Film Festival.
