= 26th Golden Horse Awards =

Award ceremony for Chinese-language films of 1988 and 1989

- Date: December 9, 1989
- Site: National Theater, Taipei, Taiwan
- Hosted by: Ba Ge and Yin Shia
- Organized by: Taipei Golden Horse Film Festival Executive Committee

Highlights
- Best Feature Film: Full Moon in New York
- Best Director: Hou Hsiao-hsien; A City of Sadness
- Best Actor: Chen Sung-young; A City of Sadness
- Best Actress: Maggie Cheung; Full Moon in New York
- Most awards: Full Moon in New York (8)
- Most nominations: Full Moon in New York (11)

Television in Taiwan
- Channel: CTV

The 26th Golden Horse Awards (Mandarin:第26屆金馬獎) took place on December 9, 1989 at the National Theater in Taipei, Taiwan.

== Winners and nominees ==
Winners are listed first and highlighted in boldface.

**Best Feature Film**: **Full Moon in New York**; The Dull Ice Flower; Banana Paradise; Wild Search; Gang of Three Forever; A City of Sadness	**Best Documentary Film** -
**Best Director**: **Hou Hsiao-hsien — A City of Sadness**; Stanley Kwan — Full Moon in New York; Yang Li-kuo — The Dull Ice Flower	**Best Director for a Documentary Film** -
**Best Leading Actor**: **Chen Sung-young — A City of Sadness**; Doze Niu — Banana Paradise; Jackie Chan — Miracles	**Best Leading Actress**: **Maggie Cheung — Full Moon in New York**; Sylvia Chang — Full Moon in New York; Cherie Chung — Wild Search
**Best Supporting Actor**: **Chang Shih — Banana Paradise**; Power Chan — Thank You, Sir; Huang Kun-hsuen — The Dull Ice Flower	**Best Supporting Actress**: **Ann Lee — The Dull Ice Flower**; Chan Cheuk-yan — Wild Search; Pauline Wong — Web of Deception
**Special Awards**: **Gong Jia-nong**; **Chen Yan-yan**; **John Lone**	**Best Foreign Film**: **The Thin Blue Line**; **Black Rain**
**Best Actor in a Foreign Film**: **William Hurt — The Accidental Tourist**	**Best Actress in a Foreign Film**: **Claudia Matschulla — The Philosopher**; **Friederike Tiefenbacher — The Philosopher**; **Adriana Altaras — The Philosopher**
**Best Director for a Foreign Film**: **David Cronenberg — Dead Ringers**
