= A Borrowed Life =

1994 film by Wu Nien-jen

- Film poster
- Directed by: Wu Nien-jen
- Written by: Wu Nien-jen
- Produced by: Wang Ying-hsiang
- Starring: Tsai Chen-nan; Kerris Tsai; Chung Yo-hong; Cheng Kwei-chung; Fu Jun; Peng Wan-chun; Lee Chuo-liang
- Cinematography: Liu Cheng-chuan
- Edited by: Liao Ching-sung
- Music by: Jiang Hsiao-wen
- Production company: Long Shong Pictures
- Release date: 1994
- Running time: 167 minutes
- Country: Taiwan
- Languages: Mandarin; Japanese

A Borrowed Life (Chinese: 多桑; pinyin: Duōsāng) is a 1994 Taiwanese drama film and the directorial debut of Wu Nien-jen. The film depicts cultural and regime change in Taiwan.

The film's running time is 167 minutes. Reviews by Ken Eisner in Variety and Stephen Holden in The New York Times noted that the film was autobiographical and told largely from the perspective of director Wu Nien-jen as a child. Eisner was critical of the film for its excessive focus on the father-son relationship, which left other characters' viewpoints unexplored. Chen Kuan-Hsing examined languages and dialects used in the film, linking differences to the cultural changes portrayed within, as Japanese rule was lifted and the Kuomintang assumed control of Taiwan.

== Selected cast ==
- Tsai Chen-nan as Sega
- Kerris Tsai as Sega's wife
- Chung Yo-hong, Cheng Kwei-chung and Fu Jun as Wen Jian
- Peng Wan-chun as sister
- Lee Chuo-liang as brother
- Akio Chen as Nomu, Sega's neighbor
- Mei Fang as Sega's mother
- Chen Hsi-huang as Sega's father
- Chang Feng-shu, Akiko, Nomu's wife
- Chen Shu-fang, Akiko's mother

== Awards and reception ==
The film won the Grand Prize (Prize of the City of Torino for Best Film - International Feature Film Competition) at the Torino Film Festival in Italy, a FIPRESCI/NETPAC Award at the 1995 Singapore International Film Festival and the Silver Alexander Award as well as the FIPRESCI Prize (International Federation of Film Critics Award) at the 1994 Thessaloniki Film Festival in Greece. It also received the Golden Horse Audience Choice Award.

Martin Scorsese considered A Borrowed Life the third best movie of the 1990s.
