= Taiwan Cinefest =

The Taiwan Cinefest was an annual Taiwanese film festival held in London over a three to five day period from 2009 to 2012. Associated events were held in Glasgow in 2010 and Paris in 2012. The screenings took place in rented cinemas and included feature-length films as well as short films and documentaries over a range of genres and subjects.

Cinefest was founded by British independent film producer, Steven Flynn. His aims were for the festival to be financially self-supporting but non profit-seeking, and independent of outside commercial and governmental influence. Costs were recouped largely through ticket sales and to a lesser extent by commercial sponsorship monies, along with some subsidy provided by the Taipei Representative Office in the United Kingdom. Flynn had to financially support the venture personally in its initial year.

== Festival Edition Summary ==
=== March 17–21 (London) & March 23–31 (Glasgow) ===
- Sorry, I Love You (U premiere)
- A Place of One's Own (UK premiere)
- Island Etude
- How Are You Dad? (UK premiere)
- Yang Yang

=== April 15–19, 2009 ===
Films screened:

- Cape No. 7
- Winds of September
- What on Earth Have i Done!? (UK premiere)
- Parking (Opening Night)
- My So-Called Love (UK premiere)
- The Most Distant Course (Closing Night) (UK premiere)
