= Li Tien-lu =

Taiwan puppeteer

- Traditional Chinese: 李天祿
- Simplified Chinese: 李天禄
Transcriptions
Standard Mandarin
- Hanyu Pinyin: Lǐ Tiānlù
Southern Min
- Hokkien POJ: Thian-lo̍k

Li Tien-lu (24 December 1910 – 13 August 1998) was a Taiwanese puppeteer. He is best known to the international audience for playing principal characters in several Taiwanese films directed by Hou Hsiao-hsien.

== Biography ==
Born in Taiwan in 1910, Li Tien-lu had been trained in glove puppetry by his father since the age of eight. He founded the puppet theatre troupe Almost Like Life in 1932, aged 22. The group ended performances in 1937, soon after the Second Sino-Japanese War began and Japanese authorities censored Taiwanese Hokkien entertainment. Almost Like Life returned to the stage in 1941. Li's troupe premiered one of its most famous performances, 300 Years of Qing Dynasty — Keng Yao, in 1948. They became even more well-known under the Kuomintang government. In 1962, Li's puppet troupe became the first to be featured in a television show. Li considered retirement in the 1970s, as the popularity of glove puppetry lessened. However, both Jacques Pimpaneau and Jean-Luc Penso visited Li from France, and Penso remained in Taiwan to learn the art of glove puppetry. Penso established the Theatre du Petit Miroir troupe in Paris in 1975. Penso later recalled Li's intense and challenging teaching style, and stated that Li refused tuition payments, as he had taught his children glove puppetry for free. Other students of Li included his sons Chen Hsi-huang and Li Chuan-tsan, as well as Huang Wu-shan, Madeleine Beresford, and Margaret Moody.

Li also performed Peking opera, Taiwanese opera, and Hakka opera. He received Taiwan's National Heritage Award in 1985, and the National Cultural Award in 1991, which was bestowed with the title of "living national treasure." In 1995, the government of France named Li a knight of the Ordre des Arts et des Lettres. The Li Tien-lu Hand Puppet Historical Museum is named after Li and opened to the public in 1996. He died at the age of 87 on 13 August 1998.

== Filmography ==
Li featured in the role of the grandfather in Hou Hsiao-hsien's 1986 film Dust in the Wind and 1987 film Daughter of the Nile. He also played the patriarch of the extended Chinese family facing the events surrounding A City of Sadness (1989). The Puppetmaster (1993) tells the true story of Li's life as a master puppeteer, spanning the years from Li’s birth in 1910 to the end of Japan’s fifty-year occupation of Taiwan in 1945. Li was posthumously featured in the 2001 documentary Tug of War: The Story of Taiwan.

== Commemoration ==
Li Tien-lu was the subject of a Google Doodle on the occasion of what would have been his 110th birthday on 24 December 2020.
