= Massagist (film) =

- Poster
- Chinese: 索命暹罗之按摩师
- Directed by: Taweewat Wantha
- Production companies: Beijing Ruisheng Taihe Media; Zhonglian Zhicheng International Media (Beijing)
- Distributed by: Xinyue Pictures
- Release date: December 31, 2015 (China)
- Running time: 92 minutes
- Countries: China; Thailand
- Languages: Mandarin; Thai
- Box office: CN¥2.5 million

Massagist is a 2015 horror film directed by Taweewat Wantha. A Chinese-Thai co-production, the film was released in China on December 31, 2015.

== Plot ==
Chinese girl Moran (Yuan Bai Zi Hui) lost her mother during childhood, but her sudden bizarre death has always been a mystery, which left her heartbroken. Having moved to Thailand, eighteen year-old Moran is perplexed by a variety of bizarre deaths that occur one after another in massage parlours, making her mother's death even more complicated and confusing.

Meanwhile, Thai policeman (Huang Kaijie) has led an in-depth investigation, discovering that the people who died are inextricably linked. Layers of mystery finally expose a cover-up and the shocking truth...

== Cast ==
- Bowie Lam
- Yuan Baizihui
- Jack Kao
- Wesley Wong
- Niu Weiqi
- Gao Xiang
- Ye Yong

== Reception ==
The film grossed US$250,000 on its opening in China.
