= Chu Tʽien-hsin =

Taiwanese writer

- 朱天心
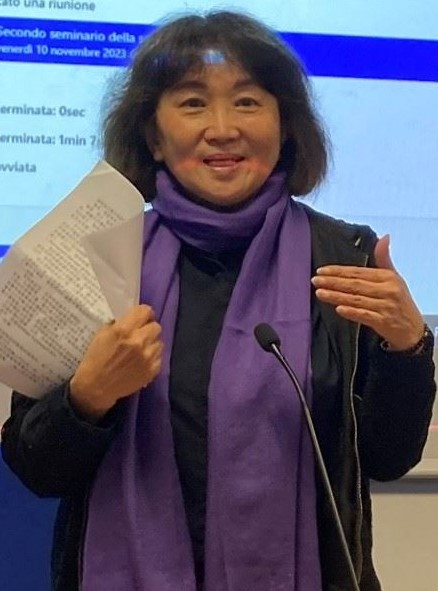
- Born: 12 March 1958 (age 68); Kaohsiung, Taiwan
- Education: National Taiwan University (BA)
- Spouse: Tang Nuo (唐諾)
- Children: Hsieh Hai-meng (謝海盟)
- Relatives: Chu Hsi-ning, father; Liu Mu-sha, mother; Chu Tien-wen, sister
- Writing career
- Language: Chinese

Chinese name
- Chinese: 朱天心
Transcriptions
Standard Mandarin
- Hanyu Pinyin: Zhū Tiānxīn
- Wade–Giles: Chu^{1} T'ien^{1}-hsin^{1}

Chu Tʻien-hsin (Traditional Chinese: 朱天心; born 12 March 1958) is a Taiwanese writer. She is considered Taiwan's foremost author on life in military dependents' villages.

Her father Chu Hsi-ning and older sister Chu Tien-wen are also famous writers.

== Biography ==
The daughter of army writer Chu Hsi-ning and translator Liu Musha, she is the younger sister of writer Chu Tien-wen and elder sister of writer of Chu Tien-yi. Chu began writing in high school and her early short stories and essays were published in 1977 as Fangzhou shang de rizi (Days on the ark) and Jirang ge (Songs of rustic pleasures). She graduated from Taipei First Girls' High School and then studied history at National Taiwan University. In 1984, she married writer and editor Xie Caijun. Their daughter was born in 1986. She wrote a number of articles for the weekly China Times.

Chu was influenced in her development as a writer by her father and also by writer and editor Hu Lancheng. In her work, she explores the challenges of reestablishing and maintaining cultural identity in a modern world.

Chu is a member of the advocacy group The Alliance for Ethnic Equality which opposes the exploitation of ethnic differences for political gain. In 2012, she was part of a group lobbying for the creation of an independent agency responsible for animal protection.

== Works translated to English ==
Year	Chinese title	Translated English title	Translator
1976	浪淘沙	"Waves Scour the Sands"	Fran Martin
1984	淡水最後列車	"The Last Train to Tamshui"	Michelle Yeh
1988	新黨十九日	"Nineteen Days of the New Party"	Martha Cheung
1992	想我眷村的兄弟們	"In Remembrance of My Buddies from the Military Compound"	Michelle Wu
1992	春風蝴蝶之事	"A Story of Spring Butterflies"	Fran Martin
1997	古都	The Old Capital	Howard Goldblatt
2001	李家寶	"Li Chiapao"	Shou-Fang Hu-Moore
2010	偷情	"The Fling"	Chris Wen-chao Li

"The Last Train to Tamshui" was adapted into a 1986 film directed by Ko I-chen, starring Yu An-shun and Fang Wen-lin.
