= Notes of a Desolate Man =

Taiwanese novel

Notes of a Desolate Man (Chinese: 荒人手記; pinyin: Huāng rén shǒujì) is a 1994 queer postmodern novel by Taiwanese writer Chu T'ien-wen (朱天文). It is one of Chu's most well-known works and won the first China Times Million (Taiwan) Dollar Literary Prize in 1994.

== Synopsis ==
The book depicts the journey of a gay man named Xiao Shao, who travels to Japan to attend the funeral of his dear friend, Ah Yao. During the funeral, he reflects on the first half of his life, confessing and repenting the entanglements he had with eight different lovers. He also shares his observations and insights on desire and mortality. The entire book is structured as a diary to portray intimate relationships among gay men, breaking free from traditional narratives to challenge established norms of male literary aesthetics. The book is rich in sensory descriptions and cultural codes, presenting a glimpse of the decadent and lustful aspects of modern urban life.

== Characters ==
- Xiao Shao (Chinese: 小韶; pinyin: Xiǎo sháo) is 40-years-old gay Taiwanese man (later identified as a mainlander) who serves as the narrator for the novel. Is best friends with Ah Yao, who is dying in Japan from complications from AIDS.
- Ah Yao (Chinese: 阿堯; pinyin: Ā yáo) is a gay/queer man and a childhood friend of Xiao Shao. He has been diagnosed with AIDS and is suffering from its complications in Japan, where he lives with his mother. Ah Yao eventually dies.
- Ah Yao’s mother has a close relationship with Xiao Shao and treats him as if he were her own son, in contrast to her relationship with Ah Yao, who does not respect her. She is Buddhist as well.
- Yongjie (Chinese: 永桔; pinyin: Yǒng jú) has been Xiao's partner for seven years. He is a freelance documentary filmmaker who travels to southwest China for work.
- Jay is a Taipei dancer who dates Xiao Shao at first but eventually falls out of love and instead leaves him for Jin.
- Fido dubbed as “Fido” from the Fido Dido logo on his t-shirt, is a handsome young man whom Xiao Shao met at a coffee shop.
- Beibei female friend of Xiao Shao and entrepreneur.

== Style ==
Notes of a Desolate Man is written in a postmodern style of "ontological dislocation," that is "notoriously" intertextual, with numerous cultural allusions, related in a stream of consciousness, and many doubts expressed about the stability of meaning. The narrator-protagonist Xiao Shao responds to his predicament by considering ideas by thinkers such as French anthropologist Claude Lévi-Strauss (especially his study Tristes Tropiques) and philosopher and gay icon Michel Foucault, as well as popular culture texts and figures as diverse as E.T.: The Extra-Terrestrial, Home Alone, Woman Basketball Player No. 5, Dream Lovers, La Dolce Vita, Tokyo Story, The Fly (two versions of the film), Aparajito, T.S. Eliot's The Waste Land, Michael Jackson, pachinko, and the Buddhist text The Diamond Sutra.

== Reception ==
Notes of a Desolate Man is recognized as one of Chu's most significant literary works.

The novel is formatted as a “private” diary, and is often categorized as a postmodern novel. While the surface of the story deals with the struggles of LGBTQ identity, the protagonist's negative attitude towards desire and a tendency to endorse mainstream heterosexual values throughout the book raises questions about whether it truly represents the voice of the LGBTQ community. Literary critic Ng Kim Chew (黃錦樹), on the other hand, believes that the author breaks free from past conventions through its use of urban settings while still carrying the influence of early efforts to revive Chinese culture in the novel, making it a tribute to the author's mentor, Hu Lancheng (胡蘭成).

The novella was awarded the China Times Million (Taiwan) Dollar Literary Prize in 1994, winning grand prize of 1 million New Taiwan Dollars.

Though written by a heterosexual woman, Notes of a Desolate Man has also been recognized as a landmark novel to thematize gay, homosexual, and queer identity, alongside such works as Pai Hsien-yung's Crystal Boys, Qiu Miaojin's Notes of a Crocodile, and Chi Ta-wei's The Membranes.

== Translation ==
In 1999, Columbia University Press published the English translation of the novel by Howard Goldblatt and Sylvia Li-chun Lin. Translators Goldblatt and Lin were awarded the National Translation Award from the American Literary Translators Association (ALTA) for flawlessly recapturing the original text into English. The acquiring editor likened the novel to Fyodor Dostoevsky's novella, Notes from Underground (1864).
