= Mahjong (film) =

- VCD cover
- Directed by: Edward Yang
- Written by: Edward Yang
- Produced by: Yu Wei-yen
- Starring: Tang Congsheng; Chang Chen; Virginie Ledoyen; Nick Erickson
- Cinematography: Li Longyu; Li Yixu
- Edited by: Chen Bo-Wen
- Music by: Forward Records
- Distributed by: Atom Films
- Release date: February 1996 (Berlin)
- Running time: 121 minutes
- Country: Taiwan
- Languages: Mandarin; English

Mahjong (traditional Chinese: 麻將; simplified Chinese: 麻将; pinyin: Májiàng) is a 1996 Taiwanese comedy film written and directed by Edward Yang. The film stars Chang Chen, Nick Erickson and Virginie Ledoyen. The film was entered into the 46th Berlin International Film Festival where it won an Honourable Mention.

== Plot ==
In 1996 Taipei, Winston Chen, a prominent tycoon, has disappeared after owing 30 billion to the underworld. The underworld believes that to find him, they need to first find his son. One evening, a rookie gangster reports to his boss that Winston’s son is in the truck he is tailing. However, the rookie is stunned and loses the truck when it intentionally crashes into a car. The two men in the truck - Winston’s son, the leader of a youth gang, and Luen-Luen, a newcomer to his gang - arrive at Hard Rock, a club where Jay, a hair salon owner and the owner of the crashed car, is introducing Hong Kong, a new employee and a member of Winston’s gang, to Ginger, an old friend and high-class escort, Markus, a British immigrant and the most sought-after interior designer in the city, and Alison, his girlfriend and valuable business asset. When Jay leaves to speak with his friends, Hong Kong is approached by Little Buddha, the fourth member of the gang who has developed a cult of personality as an extremely accurate soothsayer and espouses eccentric superstitions, such as that a man who is kissed by a woman on the lips will face bad luck, when in reality, the gang brings whatever he predicts to fruition. For example, Little Buddha foretold that Jay’s car would be wrecked, so the gang wrecks it. Wandering the club, Luen-Luen comes across Marthe, a young woman from France who has arrived in Hong Kong to find Markus, with whom she had been involved romantically but who left her high and dry. Markus’ employee introduces Marthe to Ginger, Alison, and Markus. Ginger entices Marthe with a chance to work for her (without revealing her occupation); Alison is irate and refuses to communicate with Markus; Markus confronts Marthe and tries to get her to return to Paris, to no avail. Meanwhile, Hong Kong flirts with Alison.

Leaving Hard Rock, Winston’s son and Luen-Luen see a taxi driver trying to charge Marthe extortionary rates and feign genuine protection and support, including putting her up at a hotel for the night, because Winston’s son believes that once they earn her trust, they can make a lot of money off of her. As they leave the hotel, Markus arrives and the two spend the night, but part angrily when Marthe accuses Markus of not knowing what he wants out of their relationship. Meanwhile, Hong Kong has taken Alison back to the gang’s house to spend the night and she is disturbed when she realizes that the gang shares everything, including women. Winston’s son leaves when he receives a call from his mother, who has become even more agitated when something in her house is broken. During her breakdown, she lambasts Winston’s decision to open a kindergarten chain (a money laundering front) and that 10 years ago, he had already bankrupted the family once because of an extramarital affair with a woman named “Angela,” who Winston’s son vows to find and take revenge on. Leaving his mother’s house, Winston’s son is tailed by the rookie and his boss.

Arriving at Jay’s hair salon, Jay expresses admiration over the accuracy of Little Buddha’s prophecy before greeting an elegant middle-aged woman named “Angela,” and his suspicion that she was the woman who defrauded his family is strengthened when he realizes that the man she is with is Mr. Cho, a golfing friend of Winston’s. Seeing Hong Kong’s success, Winston’s son concocts a plan to have him seduce Angela. Believing that she is staying at the new house Cho has bought for her, he orders Little Buddha to make false claims about the house’s feng shui and suggest repairs so costly that Cho will have no choice but to leave her (a decision that Little Buddha will have foretold Angela). At his office, Markus reveals that he went to Marthe’s hotel but discovers that she had left. What he does not know is that the gang had arranged for Marthe to live with them in their house, in the name of familiarizing her with the city. At a restaurant, Winston’s son receives a call from an unknown woman who claims to know his father. When he is told that there is another call for him, he instead asks Luen-Luen to answer it. Unbeknownst to the gang, the rookie and their boss have tailed them to the restaurant and, seeing Luen-Luen answer the call for “Mr. Chen,” mistake him for Winston’s son.

Arriving at Winston’s hideout, his son confronts him about his disappearance and is disappointed when Winston simply replies that he does not want to resurface to make more money because he has realized that what he wants in life cannot be bought. After work, Hong Kong evades a clingy Alison to spend the night with Angela, during which she insists on kissing him on the lips. Meanwhile, at Hard Rock, Winston’s son, Ginger, and Luen-Luen are discussing a business deal over Marthe when Winston’s son asks Luen-Luen to bring her there. Luen-Luen reveals to Marthe that Ginger works in prostitution. Marthe is stunned but is determined to make her own decisions and demands their location, which Luen-Luen accidentally reveals. Marthe storms off to Hard Rock but returns to a distraught Luen-Luen and agrees that she should not prostitute herself, and Luen-Luen decides to put her up at his place, not realizing that the rookie tailed them there. Returning to Hard Rock, Luen-Luen lies that Marthe had left them, embarrassing Winston’s son.

Winston’s son brings Little Buddha to Angela’s place in the morning and, with a little luck and help from Luen-Luen, convinces Angela of his prophetic abilities. Meanwhile, Hong Kong has escaped to Alison’s place but right after having sex, Markus arrives. He initially suspects nothing when Alison locks herself in her room but upon seeing Hong Kong’s boots, decides to break up. Winston’s son meets the mysterious woman, who ends the meeting by cryptically saying that regardless of what happens, Winston loves him. Luen-Luen returns to his place, only to be kidnapped along with Marthe by the rookie and his boss. Hong Kong returns to Angela’s, only to find that she is accompanied by two friends and be disgusted by the realization that they, too, share their lovers. Some time after the boss leaves the rookie to watch over their hostages, the rookie receives a call from his boss saying that they’ve got the wrong people, but go ahead with killing them. During these moments of inattention, Marthe and Luen-Luen free themselves and kidnap the rookie, bringing him to the gang’s place. When the boss arrives, he is neutralized by Winston’s son, who decides that they should all go to his father’s place to confront him. However, upon arrival, they find him and the woman dead in each other’s arms, so they call the police.

At the police station, Markus professes his love to Marthe, followed by Luen-Luen’s more subtle confession; she chooses the former and Luen-Luen leaves. Hong Kong is broken by his encounter and, upon learning that he had kissed Angela on the lips, Little Buddha sees more credibility in his prophecy. Meanwhile, Winston’s son receives a call from Cho, who reveals that the house was not bought for their trysts but to pay off his debts to her, and now that Little Buddha has convinced Angela that spirits inhabit her house, she refuses to accept his payment, leaving him nearly bankrupt. Cho proposes that they make a business out of Little Buddha’s prophecies, but Winston’s son rebukes it, claiming that, like his father, he cares about nothing but money and that such a life is not worth living, so he shoots Cho. Before he dies, Cho reveals the Angela from a decade ago is living in the States and the Angela Winston’s son was trying to take revenge on is just one of the hundreds of women in Taipei who share her name. Devastated, Winston’s son empties his magazine on him, realizing too late that he has left no bullet for himself.

Markus drives Marthe around Taipei, ridiculing the city’s inhabitants and prophesying it as the future center of the economic world. He stops to buy something but, upon returning, finds that Marthe has disappeared from his car. Meanwhile, the emboldened Little Buddha has recruited members to fill in the void left behind by Hong Kong and Winston’s son and yells at Luen-Luen because he appears unwilling to continue being in the gang. Luen-Luen interprets Little Buddha’s yelling as him actually needing him and, remembering how Marthe had yelled at him for not having professed his love earlier, realizes that she, too, needs him and leaves the gang’s place. Returning to his place, he is told that Marthe had just left, prompting him to search through the busy streets. Seemingly resigned to his fate of never reuniting with Marthe, Luen-Luen turns around and leaves, but pauses. When he turns around, he sees Marthe walking towards him and they embrace and kiss in the street.

== Cast ==
- Tang Tsung-sheng as Red Fish
- Chang Chen as Hong Kong
- Lawrence Ko as Lun-lun
- Virginie Ledoyen as Marthe
- Wu Nien-jen as the Older Mobster
- Elaine Jin as Chen's Wife
- Carrie Ng as Angela
- Chang Kuo-chu as Winston Chen
- Nick Erickson as Markus

== Home media ==
The film was released on Blu-ray by The Criterion Collection in 2025, sourced from a new 4K master. It's packaged with A Confucian Confusion in a double feature set.
