= Wild Search =

1989 Hong Kong film by Ringo Lam

- Film poster
- Directed by: Ringo Lam
- Written by: Nam Yin
- Produced by: Ringo Lam
- Starring: Chow Yun-fat; Cherie Chung; Roy Cheung; Tommy Wong; Elaine Jin; Paul Chun; Ku Feng
- Cinematography: Andrew Lau
- Edited by: Chow Tung-lei
- Music by: Lowell Lo
- Production companies: Born Top Productions; Golden Princess Film Production
- Distributed by: Silver Medal Presentations
- Release date: 3 June 1989
- Running time: 98 minutes
- Country: Hong Kong
- Language: Cantonese
- Box office: HK$15,944,333

Wild Search (伴我闖天涯) is a 1989 Hong Kong action drama film directed and produced by Ringo Lam. The film stars Chow Yun-fat, Cherie Chung and Chan Cheuk-yan. Chow plays Lau Chung-pong, a city policeman who becomes emotionally involved with a mainland Chinese immigrant (Chung) and her niece (Cheuk-yan) inside a New Territories village following the death of the immigrant's sister at the hands of a Vietnam-based gunrunning gang. The film was released theatrically in Hong Kong on 3 June 1989. It was nominated at the 26th Golden Horse Awards for Best Feature Film, Best Actress, and Best Supporting Actress.

== Cast and roles ==
- Chow Yun-fat as Lau Chung-pong/'Mew-Mew'
- Cherie Chung as Cher
- Roy Cheung as Bullet
- Paul Chun as Mr. Hung
- Chan Cheuk-yan as Ka-ka
- Ku Feng as Lee
- Tommy Wong as Nam
- Lau Kong as Leong
- Frankie Ng as Cheong
- Elaine Jin as Elaine Lee
- Wan Yeung-ming as Cop
