= Tseng Shu-chin =

Tseng Shu-chin 曾淑勤
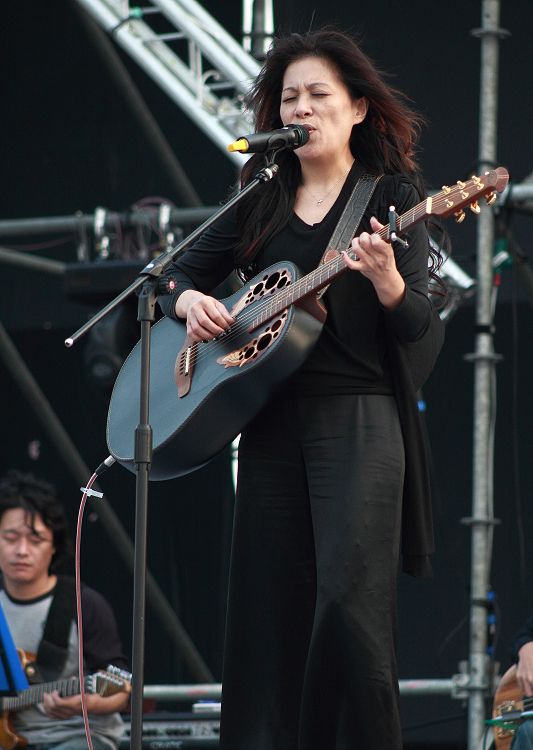
- Born: 14 August 1967 (age 58); Taitung County, Taiwan
- Occupation: Singer
- Years active: 1988–present
- Awards: Golden Melody Awards – 1990 Golden Melody Award; 1990 一個人游游盪盪

Chinese name
- Traditional Chinese: 曾淑勤
Transcriptions
- Musical career
- Origin: Taiwan
- Instrument: Vocals

Tseng Shu-chin (Chinese: 曾淑勤; born 14 August 1967 in Taitung, Taiwan) is a Taiwanese Truku singer-songwriter. She won the 1990 Golden Melody Award for Best Single Producer.

== Discography ==
- 1988: 後浪
- 1989: 裝在袋子裡的回憶
- 1990: 一個人游游盪盪
- 1990: 孤單與自由
- 1992: 不再等待天堂
- 1993: 情生意動
- 1993: 曾淑勤金選集
- 1993: 珍抒情
- 1993: 說唱十二調
- 1993: 不再等待天堂
- 1994: 爱情外的路人
- 1996: 夢橋
- 2000: 曾淑勤
- 2001: A-vai來了
- 2004: 被遺忘的靈魂聲音
- 2013: 微日舞曲

== See also ==
- Chien Yao
- The Dull Ice Flower
