= Baboo (band) =

- Origin: Taiwan
- Genres: Rock
- Years active: 1990s
- Past members: Lin Hui-che, Lee Cincin

Baboo was a seminal 1990s Taiwan rock band led by singer Lin Hui-che (zh:林暐哲) and keyboardist Lee Cincin (zh:李欣芸). They issued the album entitled New Taiwan Dollar (Chinese: 新臺幣) in 1992 and contributed to the Dust of Angels film soundtrack. Lin Hui-che went on to become a producer.
