= National Cultural Award =

The National Cultural Award (行政院文化獎) was established in 1980 by the Executive Yuan of the Republic of China in Taiwan. A lifetime achievement award, it is given to honour " those who have made special contributions to the maintenance or enhancement of culture, and is the highest honor for an individual in the cultural community." Winners of the prize include Huang Chun-ming, Lin Hwai-min, Wu Nien-jen, Hou Hsiao-hsien, Chen Hsi-huang (puppeteer) and Huang Hai-tai.
