= Taiwan Cycling Route No.1 =

Cycle route around Taiwan

Map of Cycle Route No. 1

Taiwan Cycle Route No.1 (環島1號線) is a 968 km (602 mile) bicycle route around the island of Taiwan. The route is intended to facilitate the recreational activity of bicycling around the island of Taiwan, which is called huan-dao (環島) in Mandarin Chinese, and is also translated as a "cycle-the-island-trip". The route was developed by the Taiwan (R.O.C.) Ministry of Transportation and Communications and inaugurated on December 30, 2015. The route is marked with road signs and road markings and it follows a mixture of dedicated bicycle paths, less-traveled country roads, and busier roads with dedicated cycle lanes. Although the route may be started at any point, the initial 0 kilometer marking is at Songshan Station in Taipei. Cycling the entire route generally takes 9–12 days.

== Bicycle culture in Taiwan ==
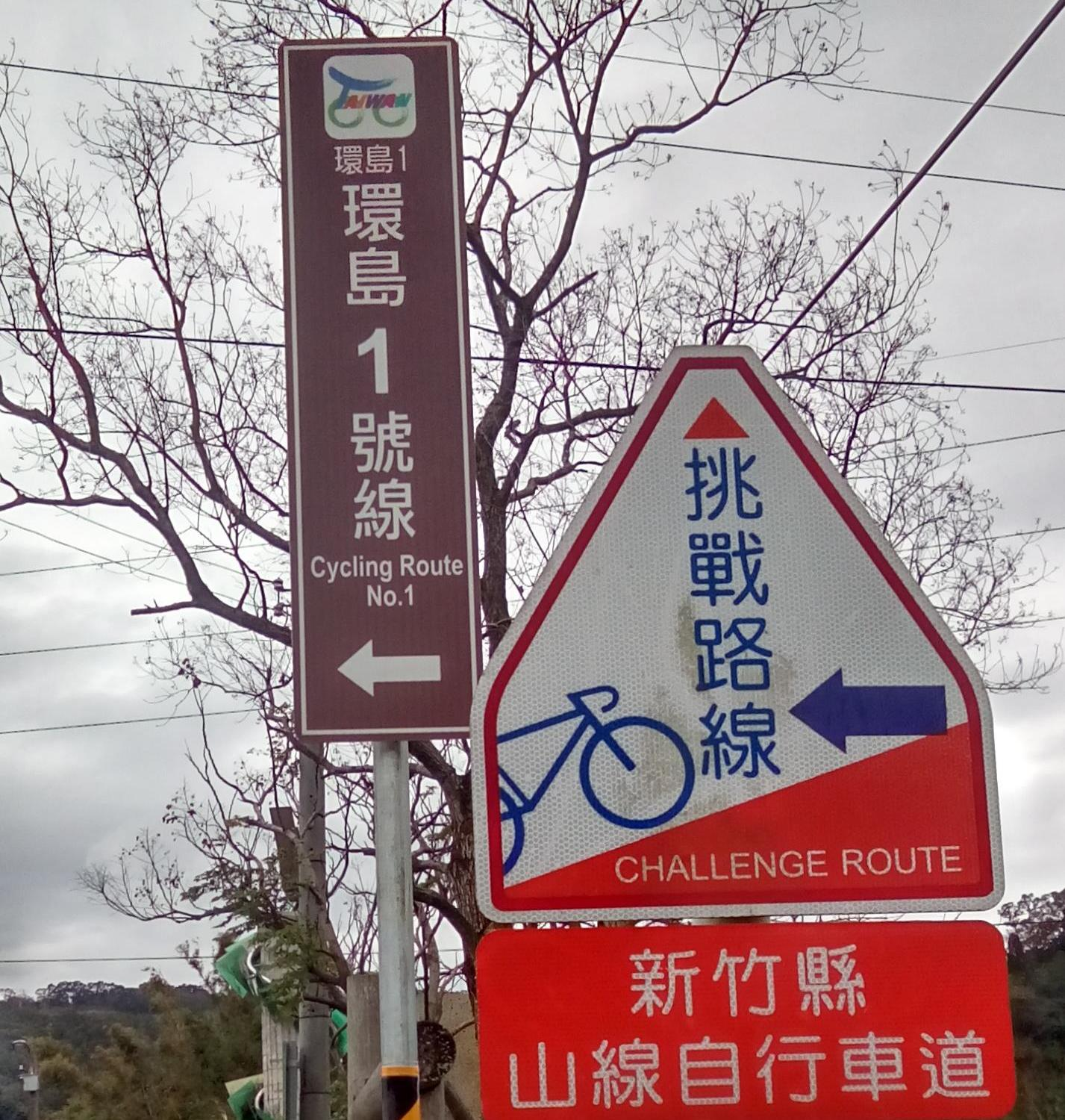
Taiwan Bicycle Route 1 sign 2

In the 1980s, the bicycle manufacturing company Giant Bicycles became a booming enterprise in Taiwan. The rising popularity of bicycle riding in Taiwan led the government to develop better cycling infrastructure in the mid-2000s. In 2006, the film Island Etude was released, which tells the adventurous story of a deaf Taiwanese man who bicycled the 1000 km journey around the island. The movie has been credited with sparking the around-the-island bicycle trip – called "huan-dao" (環島) in Chinese – becoming part of Taiwan's native culture. Cycling around the island became one of the three "Taiwan triathlon" activities, which include hiking the tallest mountain in Taiwan, the Jade Mountain (Yushan), and swimming across the Sun Moon Lake.

== Development of Taiwan Cycle Route 1 ==
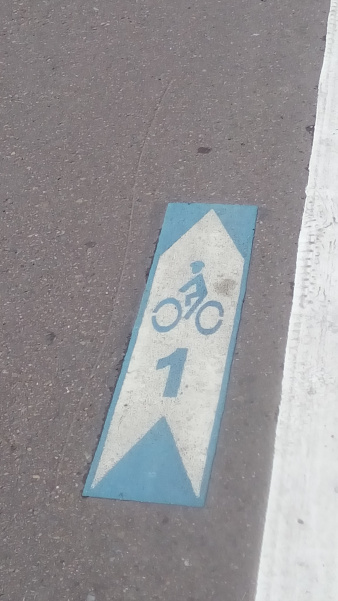
Taiwan Bicycle Route 1 road mark

The Taiwanese Ministry of Transportation and Communications (MOTC) began planning an around-the-island cycling route in 2013. Taiwan Cycle Route No.1 was launched on December 30, 2015. The project's total budget was NT$1.2 billion (36.4 million USD) and organization required collaboration with the Taiwanese Environmental Protection Administration and the Taiwanese Ministries of Education and the Interior. In addition, the MOTC collaborated with the Taiwanese police force to set up rest stops at police stations around the island. In 2015, the MOTC expressed plans to develop a second and third around-island cycle route in the future.

== Route details ==
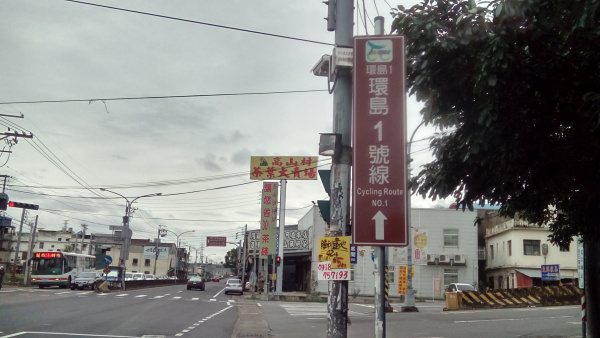
Taiwan Bicycle Route 1 sign

The Taiwan Cycle Route No.1 itinerary recommended by the Taiwanese Institute of Transportation (IOT) takes approximately nine days to ride the total route distance, depending on health and fitness and the quality of the bicycle, which consists of 3 1/2 to 6 1/2 hours of riding per stage, with an optional addition of two to three days for sightseeing at Sun Moon Lake. The highest climb of Taiwan Cycling Route No.1 is the Shouka climb, which rises nearly 500 m (1640.42 ft) up the Southern Taiwanese mountains. According to the Taiwanese Institute of Transportation (IOT), Taiwan Cycle Route No.1 has posted signs bearing white lettering on a brown background with "1" in the middle, and road marks in blue lettering on a white background with a cycle icon and "1" in the middle, placed at major intersections, at the intersection of crossroads greater than 15m, at Y-shape intersections, and bridges. Furthermore, the IOT has provided posted signs or road marks every 2 km of the route, markings every 500m in downtown areas, posted signs around rest stations, and mileage markings signs. The route also includes 122 designated rest-stops for cyclists. The official route is usually traveled counterclockwise around the island, beginning at Songshan station in Taipei, traveling on the western coast, south towards Chechung and then north along the east coast back to Taipei.

Day	Start	End	Total distance km	Total ascent m	Total descent m
Day 1	Taipei City	Hsinchu County	90.61	954	491
Day 2	Hsinchu County	Changhua County	101.88	249	247
Day 3	Changhua County	Chiayi City	84.98	149	139
Day 4	Chiayi City	Kaohsiung City	109.29	112	132
Day 5	Kaohsiung City	Pingtung County	103.67	152	160
Day 6	Pingtung County	Taitung City	115.88	959	878
Day 7	Taitung City	Hualien County	98.23	661	633
Day 8	Hualien County	Yilan County	96.77	348	455
Day 9	Yilan County	Taipei City	115.34	1045	1034

– Source:
