= Chu Hsi-ning =

Chinese writer

- Born: Chu Ch'ing-hai; June 16, 1927; Suqian, Jiangsu, Republic of China
- Died: March 27, 1998 (aged 70); Taipei, Taiwan
- Spouse: Liu Musha
- Children: Chu T’ien-wen, Chu T’ien-hsin, and Chu Tien-yi
- Writing career
- Language: Chinese

Chinese name
- Chinese: 朱西甯
Transcriptions
Standard Mandarin
- Hanyu Pinyin: Zhū Xīníng
- Wade–Giles: Chu^{1} Hsi^{1}-ning^{2}

Birth name
- Chinese: 朱青海
Transcriptions
Standard Mandarin
- Hanyu Pinyin: Zhū Qīnghǎi
- Wade–Giles: Chu^{1} Ch'ing^{1}-hai^{3}

Chu Hsi-ning (born Chu Ch'ing-hai; 16 June 1927 – 27 March 1998) was a Chinese writer based in Taiwan.

His daughters Chu T’ien-wen and Chu T’ien-hsin are also famous writers.

== Life ==
Chu was born in Suqian, China. In 1945, he entered an art college in Hangzhou, but dropped out to join the nationalist army in the struggle against the communists. He reached the rank of colonel. He was one of the soldiers who accompanied Chiang Kai-shek to Taiwan in 1949. He came to prominence as a writer in the 1950s and remained productive until his death.

He can be grouped with anti-communist writers or the soldier writers; his fiction displays an interest in the impact of modernity on ordinary people and in the clash of social forces. These are concerns he inherited from the May Fourth Movement and the writers of the 1930s. However, Chu Hsi-ning, unlike many Chinese writers of the 1930s, was a conservative. His stories reinforce traditional communal values and a morally Christian worldview.

Chu is the father of writers Chu T’ien-wen and Chu T’ien-hsin, together with whom he participated in the Three-Three series of publications in the late 1970s. The "threes" stand for the Three Principles of the People and for the Christian trinity.

== Works translated to English ==
Year	Chinese title	Translated English title	Translator
1959	大布袋戲	"The Great Puppet Show"	Hua-yuan Li Mowry
1961	鐵漿	"Molten Iron"	Nancy Chang Ing
1961	狼	"The Wolf"	Hou Chien
1963	破曉時分	"Dawn"	Hou Chien
1969	冶金者	"The Men Who Smelt Gold"	George Kao
	多少舊事煙塵	"Remembrances of Days Gone By"	Wu Wang Heng-ling
1973	將軍與我	"The General"	David Steelman
1989	我在北京	"I Was in Peking June 3–6, 1989"	Daniel T. Hu

"Dawn" was adapted into a 1968 film directed by Sung Tsun-shou and produced by Li Han-hsiang, starring Peter Yang.
