= Dust of Angels =

- Directed by: Hsu Hsiao-ming
- Written by: Hsu Hsiao-ming
- Produced by: Hou Hsiao-hsien (Executive Producer)
- Starring: Jack Kao; Yen Cheng-kuo; Tan Chih-kang; Vicky Wei; Blackie Ko
- Cinematography: Chang Hui-kung
- Edited by: Liao Ching-sung
- Release date: July 1992 (Taiwan)
- Running time: 106 minutes
- Country: Taiwan (ROC)
- Languages: Mandarin; Hokkien

Dust of Angels (Chinese: 少年吔，安啦！; Pe̍h-ōe-jī: Siàu-liān--ê, an lah!) is a 1992 Taiwanese crime film directed by Hsu Hsiao-ming, executive produced by Taiwanese filmmaker Hou Hsiao-hsien. It was entered into Directors' Fortnight at the 1992 Cannes Film Festival. "An lah" (安啦) is a Taiwanese Hokkien colloquialism; the title in full roughly translates to "take it easy, lad" or "cool it, kid."

This also is the final film acted by Tan Chih-kang before he died due to the traffic accident in September 5, 1993.

== Plot ==
The story depicts the changes in Taiwanese society under the influence of economic growth, particularly portraying the rapid increase of youth violence. The setting ranges from Beigang-zhen, Yunlin County, to Taipei, Wanhua District, Ximending. The simple town is compared with the bustling metropolis as a metaphor of the erosion of society and its changing values.

Beigang teenagers A-guo and A-douzi spend their days fighting and causing trouble in karaoke joints, hanging around in the billiard rooms, taking drugs, and generally loafing and playing all day. Little Gao, bro Jie, their friend from Beigang, has made something of a name for himself in Taipei, and brings his girl Meimei back to Beigang. A-guo and A-douzi accidentally grab a bag with guns and drugs, and head for Taipei looking for brother Jie.

== Cast ==
- Jack Kao as Little Kao, bro Jie (小高／捷哥)
- Yen Cheng-kuo as A-Guo
- Tan Chih-kang as A-Douzi
- Vicky Wei as Mei-Mei
- Chen Sung-young as Guo's brother-in-law
- Lee Hsing-wen as A-Wen
- Tsai Chen-nan as A-Nan
- Chang Shih as Killer
- Blackie Ko
- Lim Giong as Club Singer (cameo appearance)
- Lo Ta-yu as Club Singer (cameo appearance)

== Soundtrack ==
少年吔，安啦！ Siàu-liān-ê Àn-la! Dust of Angels

Soundtrack album
- Released: 1992
- Genre: Soundtrack
- Length: 46:09
- Language: Taiwanese Hokkien
- Label: Mandala Works / Pony Canyon Taiwan (真言社 / 波麗佳音)

The soundtrack features ten Taiwanese, instrumental rock and ambient music songs by performers considered to be alternative or avant-garde in the Taiwanese music scene at the time. Some of the contributors to the album united in the mid-2000s for the series of Taike Rock Concerts (台客搖滾演唱會).

Popular singer Lim Giong's "A Soundless Place" (無聲的所在) performed with Hou Hsiao-hsien (the movie's producer) became a popular Taiwanese staple. Rock singer-songwriter Wu Bai who achieved immense popularity in East Asia the late 1990s and 2000s, contributed two songs including the title track under his given name of Wu Chun-lin. These songs represented Wu Bai's first major commercial music release and featured two of the three members of his band, China Blue. Fellow Taike performers Baboo contributed three songs and had backing roles on several of the others on the album. Chinese jazz saxophonist Liu Yuan also performed one of the album's songs.

For the 29th Golden Horse Awards in 1992, the soundtrack was nominated for a Golden Horse in the category of Best Original Film Music, losing to the soundtrack for Rebels of the Neon God. The song "Dust of Angels" was also nominated for the Best Original Film Song award the same year.

1. "A Soundless Place" (無聲的所在 Bô-siaⁿ ê só·-chāi) by Lim Giong & Hou Hsiao-hsien (林強&侯孝賢)
  Also translated as "A Place of Silence"
2. "Lighting a Cigarette" (點煙 Tiám ian) by Wu Chun-lin (吳俊霖)
3. "You're the Meanest" (你真正上厲害 Lí chin-chiàⁿ siong lī-hāi) by Lim Giong (林強)
4. "Cool It, Boy" (少年安 Siàu-liān an) by Baboo
5. "Dreaming Peach Flowers" (Instrumental) (夢桃花 Bāng thô-hoe) by Liu Yuan (劉元)
6. "Dust of Angels" (少年也，安啦！Siàu-liān-ê àn-la) by Wu Chun-lin (吳俊霖)
7. "All the Lamp-posts" (電火柱仔 Tiān-hé thiāu-á) by Baboo
8. "Come Get Money, Everybody" (赶緊來賺錢 Koáⁿ-kín lâi thàn-chîⁿ) by Lim Giong (林強)
9. "Instrumental" (演奏曲 Ián-chàu khek) by Baboo
10. "The One in My Dream" (夢中人 Bāng-tiong lâng) by Hou Hsiao-hsien (侯孝賢)
