= A Confucian Confusion =

1994 film directed by Edward Yang

- Re-release film poster
- 獨立時代
- Directed by: Edward Yang
- Written by: Edward Yang; Hung Hung
- Produced by: David Sui; Yu Wei-yen
- Starring: Chen Shiang-chyi
- Cinematography: Li Longyu; Hung Wu-Hsiu; Chang Chan; Arthur Wong
- Edited by: Chen Bo-Wen
- Music by: Antonio Lee
- Production company: Atom Films and Theater
- Release date: 13 May 1994 (Cannes Film Festival)
- Running time: 129 minutes
- Country: Taiwan
- Languages: Mandarin; Taiwanese

A Confucian Confusion (Chinese: 獨立時代; pinyin: Dúlì Shídài; lit. 'The Age of Independence') is a 1994 Taiwanese satirical comedy film directed by Edward Yang following the crisscrossing paths of a group of young friends, lovers, and acquaintances in contemporary Taipei over 3 days and 2 nights. It was entered into the 1994 Cannes Film Festival.

A 4K digital restoration was completed in 2022, with a premiere at the 79th Venice Film Festival in 2022.

== Plot ==
In 1994 Taipei, Molly is engaged to Akeem, the son of a wealthy family. Wishing for something to occupy her and prodded by his friend and auditor Larry as part of his plan to force her to marry him, Akeem gives her a small entertainment company to manage. The company has two current projects - 1) a weekly TV talk show about finding happiness in life, hosted by Molly’s sister and 2) a play by Molly’s friend Birdy, who stole the idea for it from an old, pulpy romantic bestseller by Molly’s brother-in-law (“the author” henceforth). He has since moved into an apartment alone to write darker, more pessimistic, and commercially unviable works, and their marriage has consequently deteriorated.

To quiet accusations of infringement of intellectual property rights, Molly asks her secretary and confidant Qiqi to obtain permission from the author, but a busy Qiqi asks new employee Feng to take care of it. Meanwhile, Molly’s sister asks Molly about rumors of her having an affair with Birdy behind Akeem’s back, as he is vacationing in mainland China; Molly dismiss them and downplay their ramifications. Feng returns to tell Qiqi that she was thrown out by the author, so Qiqi agrees to take over the matter. Qiqi’s boyfriend, Ming, is a promising young bureaucrat. That day, he learns from his colleague Liren that he is being harassed by a contractor who finished a project late and wants him to write off those days as weather-related delays. Larry arrives at the company to conduct an audit, which reflects poorly on the company’s financial condition. During it, Larry receives a call from Akeem, who has returned from the mainland ahead of schedule. As Larry leaves, a frustrated Molly fires Feng on a whim. Qiqi knows she aspires to an acting career and suggests that she auditions for Birdy’s play the next day. Molly receives a call from Akeem and delays meeting him until breakfast the next morning. Larry meets Akeem, who claims to be blasé about the rumors but is secretly distraught. Right afterwards, Larry meets up with Molly to spend the evening.

Concurrently, Ming and Liren have just gotten off work and walking past a restaurant, see Qiqi and Feng. Liren enters to flirt with Feng while Qiqi leaves with Ming because they are having dinner with his father and aunt. During the meal, Ming’s father and aunt introduce Qiqi to the former's friend, with whom she will be working should she accept the new public relations job that his aunt has found for her. Ming, though cynical about his aunt’s intentions and not close to his father, persuades her to accept the more lucrative and adventurous offer and leave Molly because he had a confrontation with her and Qiqi frequently complains about having to clean up after Molly, but she is reluctant to part with her on account of their friendship. Meanwhile, Larry accuses Molly of insulting his integrity by asking him whether his relationship with Feng is an amorous one, so Molly kicks him out.

Larry goes to a bar where Akeem is drunkenly yelling out for Molly, calms him down, and reveals the next part of his plan - now that Molly’s company is in shambles, he can reclaim ownership of the company and, by extension, Molly. Larry, who has designs on Molly, also promises to help Akeem identify her secret lover. Molly meets up with Qiqi and she confesses her anxiety over people thinking she fakes her cheerfulness and dismay that Molly seems to be withholding more and more from her. Upon returning home, Ming’s mother tells him that Liren is at a bar. On the way there, he meets the contractor, who wants him to sympathize with his situation. At the bar, Ming convinces Liren to forge the documents. Outside it, he and Feng walk to her home, him spilling his guts about the disappointment of his relationship with Qiqi. Feng claims her roommate will not be back until very late and intimates sex, but upon seeing Larry, puts him on a taxi home, for her roommate is her boyfriend, Larry. Feng presses Larry about his relationship with Molly and he denies pursuing her.

Over breakfast, Akeem agrees to continue funding the company in the hope that some love will blossom between them once it becomes successful. Qiqi meets the author, who is indifferent to the plagiarism of works he now disowns and accuses her of putting on a cheerful appearance. Molly meets Ming for lunch, where she reveals that her sister was betrothed to Akeem but fell in love with the author, so Akeem’s father picked Molly as her replacement, and he discloses Qiqi’s offer and reluctance to tell Molly about it, news that she appears to be happy about and supportive of but is devastated by. Returning to the company, Qiqi tells Molly that her sister is waiting for her at the studio; she confronts her about what Ming said and leaves. Larry meets Akeem and fingers Birdy. At the studio, Molly’s sister and Birdy have just finished filming their episode when Akeem arrives and attacks him, infuriating Molly. Outside Ming’s workplace, Qiqi confronts him about his revelation to Molly, to which he asks her to choose between him and Molly. Returning to his office, he learns that Liren has been fired for forgery. Feng visits the set and catches Birdy’s eye.

Qiqi visits the author again and confides in him about her troubles. He shows her some of his new work, including A Confucian Confusion, a veiled autobiographical novel about the reincarnation of Confucius in a modern world that abides by his teachings and his realization that people think he is a charlatan and his popularity is due to people’s interest in learning how to become a successful one like him. While reading his new work, Molly’s sister arrives and after Qiqi leaves, tries to convince him to return. After trading blows over her optimistic show and his pessimistic work, she assures him that she will always wait for him. A shaken Ming goes to visit his dad but leaves before his aunt can fetch him; his dad throws a tantrum as a result.

While making out with Feng on-set after hours, Birdy is interrupted by the arrival of the script girl, then gets a call that he expected to be from Akeem, but it is from Molly, who is waiting outside in her car. On their drive, he swears retribution against Akeem’s attack. Meanwhile, Feng receives the call from Akeem, who is waiting with Larry outside. Arguing that this may be a sex plot designed by Birdy, Larry decides to go upstairs instead of Akeem to meet Birdy. Right then, Molly and Birdy pull up. Seeing their argument, Akeem realizes that they could not possibly be having an affair. Akeem tells Birdy about Larry and he goes up while the former stays with his car. Moments later, he decides to go upstairs too and after running into Feng in the elevator, finds Larry chasing Birdy with a sword prop. Dismayed that he identified the wrong lover and is being restrained by Akeem, Larry decries that his commitment to their friendship has not been reciprocated; Akeem responds by putting him in an elevator. Wandering the set, Akeem meets the script girl. Outside his house, Ming finds Molly distraught over her falling out with Qiqi; he comforts her and they spend the night. Meanwhile, Qiqi arrives at the author’s place, where he tells her that just as he was about to commit suicide, her face appeared in his mind and she is his only reason for continuing to live. Qiqi leaves when he assumes that she views him similarly and he chases down her taxi. After conversing with the driver, the author realizes that the way to fight the hypocrisy he sees in the modern world is not with death, as he proposes in his recent work, but by living honestly, and walks away. After sex, Molly begs Ming to tell her that he loves her, and when he refuses to lie, she leaves.

Qiqi arrives at the company to find Molly there alone and they reconcile. Akeem arrives to call off the engagement, stating that he does not want to risk having a relationship like Molly’s sister’s, where both parties pretend to be in love, and has fallen in love with someone else (implied to be the script girl). Molly agrees, on the condition that he reclaims the company, which he gladly accepts, since the script girl is also in entertainment. At home, Qiqi receives a phone call that Ming’s father is in an ICU after excessive drinking over missing Ming the previous night; he survives. In the hospital’s elevator, Ming and Qiqi amicably break up and promise to stay in touch, with Ming suggesting that maybe they can get coffee sometime. Qiqi walks towards the exit while Ming returns to the elevator to go back upstairs to his dad. However, he hesitates and instead presses the “open” button and, to his surprise, finds Qiqi standing right outside. She asks if he feels like having that cup of coffee and he hugs her.

== Cast ==
- Chen Shiang-chyi as Qiqi
- Yiwen Chen as Liren
- Danny Dun as Larry
- Hung Hung as Molly's brother-in-law
- Elaine Jin as Auntie
- Chen Limei as Molly's sister
- Richie Li as Feng
- Suk Kwan Ni as Molly
- Bosen Wang as Akeem
- Weiming Wang as Ming
- Yeming Wang as Birdy

== Home media ==
The film was released on Blu-ray by The Criterion Collection in 2025, sourced from the 2022 4K master. It's packaged with Mahjong in a double feature set.
