= Chen Hsi-huang (puppeteer) =

Taiwanese puppeteer (born 1931)

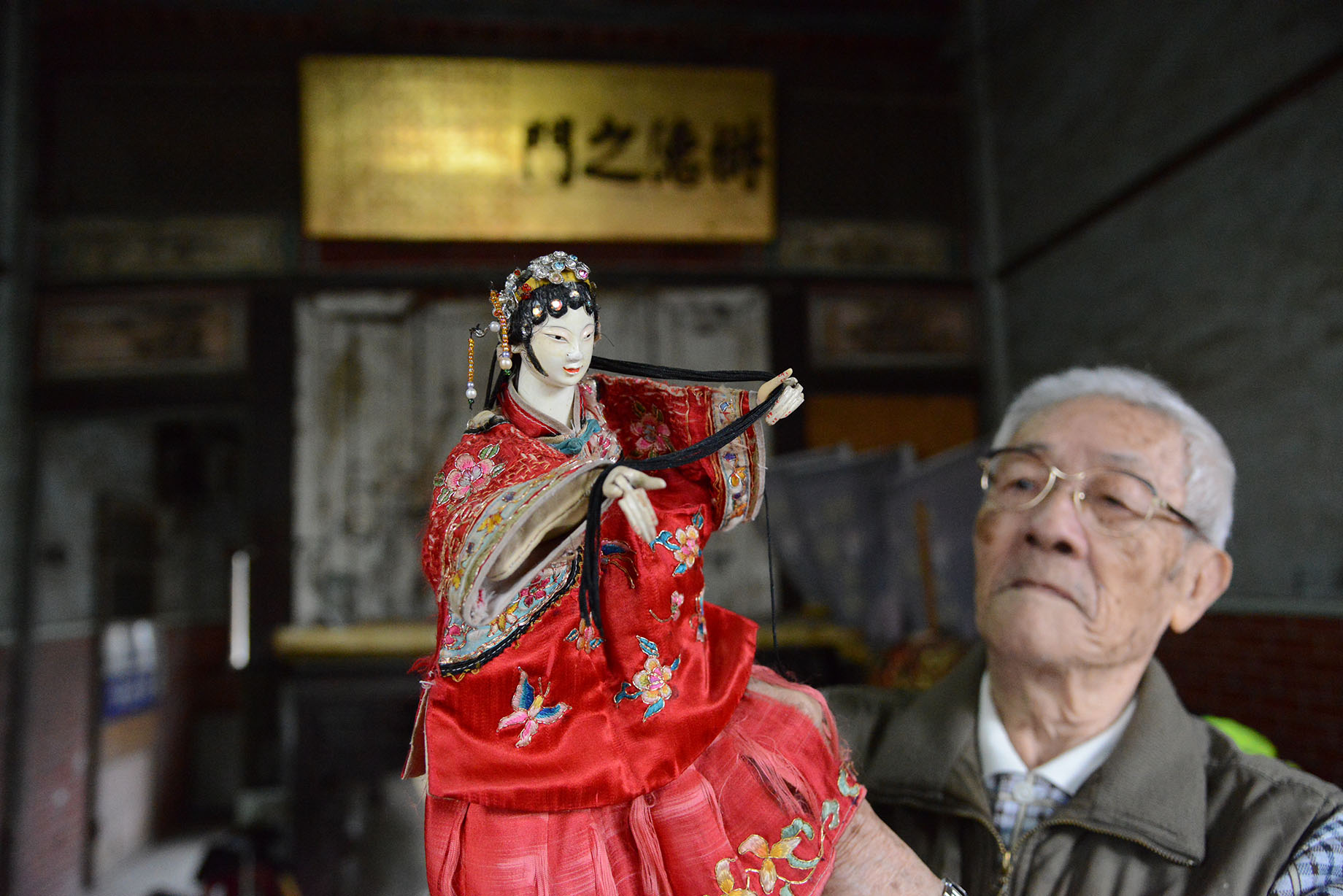
Chen Hsi-huang demonstrating a female hand puppet.

Chen Hsi-huang (Chinese: 陳錫煌; Pe̍h-ōe-jī: Tân Sek-hông; b. Taipei, 1931) is a Taiwanese glove puppeteer based in Taipei.

Chen was born in 1931 as the eldest son of Li Tien-lu. He bears his mother's surname because his father had entered a ruzhui marriage to ensure his parents-in-law had a male heir.

Chen was the subject of a 2018 documentary directed by Yang Li-chou and produced by Hou Hsiao-hsien. Father explored the relationship between Chen and Li Tien-lu.

In 2020, he received the National Cultural Award.
