= Chen Sung-young =

Taiwanese actor (1941–2021)

Chen Sung-young (Chinese: 陳松勇; Pe̍h-ōe-jī: Tân Siông-ióng; 1 July 1941 – 17 December 2021) was a Taiwanese actor. He received the Golden Horse Award for Best Actor in 1989. He died on 17 December 2021, at the age of 80.

== Selected filmography ==
- A City of Sadness (1989)
- The Dull Ice Flower (1989)
- No Risk, No Gain (1990)
- Prison on Fire II (1991)
- Dust of Angels (1992)
- Fong Sai-yuk (1993)
- The Great Conqueror's Concubine (1994)
- Gorgeous (1999)
- Born to Be King (2000)
- Feng Shui Family (2012–2014)
