= Island Etude =

- Film poster
- Traditional Chinese: 練習曲
- Simplified Chinese: 练习曲
- Hanyu Pinyin: Liànxí Qǔ
- Directed by: Chen Hwai-en
- Written by: Chen Hwai-en
- Produced by: Yang Li-yin; Wang Keng-yu
- Starring: Tung Ming-hsiang; Teng An-ning
- Cinematography: Chen Hwai-en
- Edited by: Chen Po-wen; Liu Yue-xing
- Music by: Cincin Lee
- Production company: Zoom Hunt International Productions Company Ltd.
- Release date: November 22, 2006 (Taiwan)
- Running time: 109 minutes
- Country: Taiwan
- Languages: Mandarin; Taiwanese Hokkien; English; Lithuanian

Island Etude (Chinese: 練習曲; pinyin: Liànxí Qǔ) is a 2006 Taiwanese film directed by Chen Hwai-en. It was Taiwan's submission to the 80th Academy Awards for the Academy Award for Best Foreign Language Film, but was not accepted as a nominee.

== Plot ==
A film about a hearing impaired college student who grabs his bike, backpack, and guitar and goes on a 7-day, 6-night round-the-island tour. On the way he discovers the natural and cultural beauty of Taiwan and during his encounters with different people he is exposed to local arts, folk customs, approaches to environmental protection, traditional family values, and a host of other cultural enlightenments.

== Cast ==
- Tung Ming-hsiang as Ming
- Teng An-ning as film director
- Yuen-lun as Canadian biker
- Chen Hsiu-hui as Canadian biker's mother
- Ruta Palionyte as Lithuanian model
- Yang Li-yin as Teacher Liu
- Wu Nien-jen as Your Guide Wu

== See also ==
- Cinema of Taiwan
- List of films about bicycles and cycling
- List of submissions to the 80th Academy Awards for Best Foreign Language Film
- List of films featuring the deaf and hard of hearing
