= Kerris Tsai =

- Born: 20 April 1967 (age 58); Sihu, Yunlin County, Taiwan
- Occupation: Singer
- Years active: 1987–present

Chinese name
- Traditional Chinese: 蔡秋鳳
- Simplified Chinese: 蔡秋凤
Transcriptions
Standard Mandarin
- Hanyu Pinyin: Cài Qiūfèng
- Musical career
- Origin: Taiwan
- Genres: Hokkien pop
- Instrument: Vocals

Kerris Tsai (Chinese: 蔡秋鳳; born 20 April 1967) is a Taiwanese Hokkien pop singer.

== Discography ==
- July 1979: 姐妹情深; Sisterhood
- 1981: 少女的心聲; Girl's Voice
- 1982: 行船人的夢; Boatman's Dream
- June 1983: 大姊頭仔的心聲; Big Brother and Son of the Voice
- May 1984: 傷心的所在—未完成的戀夢; Sad Place – Unfinished Love Dream
- 1987: 袂看破—什麼樂; See the Break / What the Fun?
- 1987: 酒落喉—酒醉的滋味; Wine Drops the Throat / Taste of Drunkenness
- 1988: 船過水無痕—醉袂停; The Boat is not Trace of Water / Stop by Drunk
- 1989: 悲情的運命—酒矸仔伴—甭擱憨; Tragic Fate / Cherry & Companion / Don't say Foolishness
- 1989: 金包銀; Gold & Silver
- 1990: 爛田準路; Rotten Field Road
- 1994: 一步一腳印．新都市戀情; Step by step. New City of romance
- 1995: 世間．菜瓜旋籐; World. Bean Sprouts
- March 1996: 算命; Fortune Teller
- May 1997: 拼輸贏; Fight the Win
- April 1998: 生活影印機; Photocopier of Life
- April 2002: 花落土時; When the flowers are Soiled
- March 2003: 爽到你艱苦到我; Cool to You and it's Hard to Me
- November 2003: 醉英雄—超級賣; Hero of Ebrious / Super Sale
- December 2004: 笑紅塵; Laughing Red Dust
- May 2005: 紅色的玫瑰跨世紀（新歌+精選); The Red Roses Crosses the Century (New Song + Selection)
- May 2005: 粉紅色腰帶; Pink belt
- May 2006: 無情的人誰人了解我; Relentless People Who Know Me
- July 2007: 女人啊女人; Woman, Oh Woman
- July 2008: 一段情; A Situation of Love
- December 2009: 一切攏是空; It's Empty
- January 2011: 一口飯; One Meal
- December 2011: 問韓信; Ask Han Xin
- February 2012: 離別海岸; Off the Coast
- January 2013: 醉李白; Li Bai's Drunk
- October 2014: 快給我愛; Give my Love so Fast
- October 2015: 一寸心; One-Inch Heart
- November 2016: 十全十美; Perfect
- November 2017: 走不知路; I Don't Know the Way to go
- November 2018: 離水的魚; Fish Out of Water
- October 2019: 巷仔口; Hang-a-Khau
- October 2020: 鏡中女人花; Woman's Flower in the Mirror
- December 2022: 憐朱安; Lin-Tsu-An
