= The Dull Ice Flower =

- Film poster
- 魯冰花
- Directed by: Yang Li Kuo
- Written by: Wu Nien-jen
- Produced by: Tu Yu-Ling
- Starring: Huang Kun Hsuan; Lee Shu Chen; Chen Sung-young; Chen Wei sin Yu Han; Lee Yi Hsiung
- Cinematography: Mark Lee Ping Bin
- Edited by: Huang Cheng-hsiang
- Music by: Tseng Shu-chin
- Production company: Cos Group
- Release date: 26 August 1989 (Taiwan)
- Running time: 93 minutes
- Country: Taiwan
- Languages: Mandarin; Taiwanese Hokkien

The Dull Ice Flower (Chinese: 魯冰花, literally translated as lupine flower) is a 1989 Taiwanese drama film based on the novel of the same title by Chung Chao-cheng. Dealing with education and other social issues in rural Taiwan in the deprived 1950s and early 1960s, the story was adapted into a screenplay by Wu Nien-jen.

== Synopsis ==
Ku A-ming (古阿明) is a fourth grader at Chungshan Elementary School in Shuiyu Township. Despite being not very good in most subjects at school, he is very talented in art and has a great imagination, though most teachers cannot understand what he's expressing in his artwork. During a morning assembly, a new art teacher named Mr. Kuo asks if anyone is interested in joining the after school art club. Ku A-ming was the first one to volunteer. During an art competition, the school teachers voted to decide a winner to represent the school in a nationwide competition; most voted the mayor's son for their own interests. Since A-ming lost, Mr. Kuo protested by quitting his job at the school. Before he leaves, he asked A-ming to give him one of his drawings. Sadly, after Mr. Kuo has left, A-ming succumbs to his chronic liver illness, leaving behind an incomplete drawing. Mr. Kuo sends A-ming's drawing to a worldwide children's art competition, with A-ming's winning as the champion. The teachers begin to regret for neglecting A-ming's great artistic talent. During A-ming's funeral, A-ming's father burned his son's drawings to commemorate A-ming's passing.

== Awards ==
At the 26th annual Golden Horse Film Festival, The Dull Ice Flower was nominated for 6 awards, including Best Feature Film, Best Director, Best Leading Actor, and Best Original Film Score. It won 2 awards, namely Best Supporting Actress and Best Original Film Song. The movie was chosen as “My most favourite Taiwan movie” in a poll organised by the Taiwan Film and Audiovisual Institute in 2023. In 2026 Cannes Film Festival, the film's restored version was selected for the Cannes Classics section.

== See also ==
- Chien Yao
- Jenny Tseng
- Tseng Shu-chin
