= A City of Sadness =

1989 Taiwanese film by Hou Hsiao-hsien

- Taiwanese film poster
- Chinese: 悲情城市
- Literal meaning: City of sadness
- Hanyu Pinyin: bēiqíng chéngshì
- Directed by: Hou Hsiao-hsien
- Written by: Wu Nien-jen; Chu T’ien-wen
- Produced by: Chiu Fu-sheng
- Starring: Tony Leung Chiu-wai; Xin Shufen; Chen Sung-young; Jack Kao; Li Tian-lu
- Cinematography: Chen Hwai-en
- Edited by: Liao Ching-sung
- Music by: S.E.N.S.
- Production company: 3-H Films
- Distributed by: Era Communications (Int'l rights)
- Release dates: 4 September 1989 (Venice Film Festival); October 1989 (Taiwan)
- Running time: 157 minutes
- Country: Taiwan
- Languages: Taiwanese; Mandarin; Japanese; Cantonese; Shanghainese

A City of Sadness (Chinese: 悲情城市; pinyin: Bēiqíng chéngshì) is a 1989 Taiwanese historical drama directed by Hou Hsiao-hsien. It tells the story of the Lin family amid the political turmoil surrounding the February 28 Incident of 1947 and the emergence of the political repression that later became known as Taiwan's "White Terror". The film was the first to deal openly with the Kuomintang government's (KMT) authoritarian rule after its 1945 takeover of Taiwan following Japan's defeat in World War II, and the first to depict the February 28 Incident in Taiwanese cinema. Scholars have also regarded the film as an important work in Taiwan's ongoing engagement with the memory and legacy of the White Terror.”

A City of Sadness was the first (of three) Taiwanese films to win the Golden Lion award at the Venice Film Festival, and is often considered Hou's masterpiece. The film was selected as the Taiwanese entry for the Best Foreign Language Film at the 62nd Academy Awards, but was not accepted as a nominee.

This film is regarded as the second installment in the Wu Nien-jen trilogy as well as the first installment in a loose trilogy of Hsiao-Hsien's films that deal with Taiwanese history, which also includes The Puppetmaster (1993) and Good Men, Good Women (1995). These films are collectively called the "Taiwan Trilogy" by academics and critics.

== Plot ==
As Emperor Hirohito announces Japan's unconditional surrender in World War II, the Lin family headed by Lin Ah-lu (Li Tian-lu) is in Keelung, a coastal town near Taipei, to celebrate the opening of their nightclub and gambling house called ‘Little Shanghai’, operated by the first son, Wen-hsiung (Chen Sung-young). The same day, the young nurse Hinomi (Hsin Shu-fen) arrives to take her new position at Kinguichu Miners’ Hospital, where her brother Hinoe has asked his friend, Wen-ching (Tony Leung), the deaf fourth son of the Lin family, to meet her.

As the Japanese are leaving the island, Hinomi parts with her friend, Shizuko (Nakamura Ikuyo), and spends time with Hinoe (Wu Yi-fang) and his socialist friends. Wen-liang, the Lin family’s third son (Jack Kao) returns to Taiwan, shellshocked from his experience serving in the Japanese army. Once he recovers, he links up with Taiwanese gangster ‘Red Monkey’ (Ai Tsu-tu) and a Shanghainese mob, who convince him to take part in a smuggling operation which involves Wen-hsiung’s shipping business. Red Monkey introduces Ah-ga (Kenny Cheung), the brother of Wen-hsiung’s concubine to the bar hostess Ah-tsun, and attempts to involve him in the distribution of counterfeit Japanese money. Shortly thereafter, Red Monkey is killed and the money disappears. Wen-hsiung inadvertently discovers Ah-ga, Wen-liang, and their gangster friends from Shanghai have used his ships and storehouse to smuggle illegal goods, and demands they halt their criminal activities.

Later in a gambling house, Wen-liang recognises Ah-tsun, now under the ‘protection’ of one of the mainland gangsters, Kim-tsua, and unsuccessfully demands she provide his share of Red Monkey's money, leading to the gangsters to beat Wen-liang up. Despite an attempt at mediation, the Shanghai gang use their mainland connections to denounce the Lin brothers as Japanese collaborators. While Wen-hsiung escapes, Wen-liang is arrested by Nationalist soldiers. Wen-hsiung and Ah-ga organise a meeting with the Shanghai gangsters to obtain his release. However, Wen-liang has been tortured in jail, and suffers brain damage as a result.

Hinomi and Wen-ching develop a special friendship as she spends more time with the Lin household. She also befriends Ah-shue (Huang Tsien-ru), one of Wen-hsiung’s daughters.

The February 28 Incident of 1947 occurs, in which thousands of Taiwanese protesting against Kuomintang rule, are massacred. As Chen Yi, the chief executive of Taiwan, declares martial law, Hinomi and Hinoe seek refuge in their parents’ ancestral home, but their father orders Hinoe to find another hiding place. From Hinomi's correspondence with Ah-shue, she learns Wen-ching was arrested at the Kinguichu Miners' Hospital. In prison, Wen-ching learns the Kuomintang are conducting summary trials and executions. He is released and visits the widow of one of his cellmates who was executed, before tracking down Hinoe, who has married and joined an anti-Kuomintang guerilla group in the mountains. Wen-ching attempts to join Hinoe, who refuses and tells Wen-ching Hiromi loves him. Upon Wen-ching's return to the Lin family house, he finds Hinomi involved in domestic chores there.

Wen-ching informs Hiromi he found Hinoe during his trip. Wen-hsiung, restless on account of having closed the business after the events of February and March, scolds him for not proposing to Hinomi and storms out of the house to gamble with Ah-ga. In the gambling house, Ah-ga confronts one of the gangsters responsible for Wen-liang’s arrest, and a fight ensues in which Wen-hsiung is killed. Shortly after Wen-hsiung’s funeral, Hinomi and Wen-ching marry, and Hinomi gives birth to a boy, Ah-chien.

The couple continue to provide covert funding to Hinoe's resistance group, but the government soon defeats and executes almost all of the guerilla forces, including Hinoe. A survivor informs Wen-ching of this, but Hinomi notes they have nowhere to flee to. Wen-ching is arrested and disappeared by the government for his involvement with the guerillas soon after. In a letter to Ah-shue, Hinomi writes she has searched for news of Wen-ching around Taipei, but cannot find him.

== Historical background ==
During the fifty years of Japanese colonial rule (1895-1945), Taiwan's development under Japanese rule differed drastically from that of mainland China. After Japan's defeat in World War II, rule over Taiwan was transferred to the Republic of China (ROC) led by the Kuomintang. This led to significant political, social, cultural, and economic changes for the Taiwanese people. Cultural and social conflicts arose between the native Taiwanese who had experienced fifty years of Japanese colonial rule and the mainlanders who came to Taiwan with the Kuomintang after the war. As political power became increasingly concentrated in the hands of mainland elites in the new government, political distrust further intensified.

Meanwhile, in the late 1940s, the Nationalist government was engaged in a civil war against the Communists on the mainland. The Chinese economy deteriorated rapidly, and the post-war economic situation in Taiwan worsened daily. An increasing number of illegal activities took place across the Taiwan Strait, and social disturbances—resulting from unemployment, food shortages, poverty, and housing issues—became imminent.

=== The February 28th Incident ===
One of the restrictions implemented at the time was the ban of cigarette trading. The immediate story begins in the front of a tea house in Taipei the day before, on February 27, 1947, when agents from the Tobacco Monopoly Bureau confiscated a Taiwanese female cigarette vendor's illegal cigarettes as well as her money, and then beat her over the head with a pistol while attempting to arrest her. An angry crowd swarmed the agents, prompting one official to open fire on the crowd, killing a bystander. The news triggered mass protests the following morning on February 28; more people were killed by the police and it quickly turned into a large-scale riot. While many local Taiwanese took this as an opportunity to seek revenge on mainlanders, Governor Chen Yi issued martial law and requested Nationalist troops from the mainland to suppress the incident. For the following 38 years, Taiwan was placed under martial law in a period now known as the "White Terror", where a generation of Taiwanese local elites were arrested and killed. It was estimated that between 10,000 and 20,000 people died as a result of the 2/28 incident, with more people dying or going missing during the White Terror. The trauma of 2/28 haunted Taiwan's politics and society and soured the relationship between the Taiwanese and mainlanders for several decades.

== Cast ==
- Tony Leung Chiu-wai as Lin Wen-ching (林文清), fourth brother, a photographer. He is deaf-mute because of an accident in his childhood. He communicates with others mainly by writing, especially with Hinomi. He falls in with the anti-Kuomintang intellectuals and is eventually arrested for it.
- Chen Sung-young as Lin Wen-hsiung (林文雄), eldest brother, and owner of a trading company and the Little Shanghai restaurant. After his restaurant is closed down following 2/28, he falls into drinking and gambling, and is shot to death during a spur of the moment revenge attack for Wen-liang.
- Jack Kao as Lin Wen-liang (林文良), third brother, traumatized by his time in the war. After his release from hospital, he goes into business with Shanghai gangsters. After causing them more trouble than he is worth, Wen-liang is framed by the gangsters and goes to prison where he is beaten and suffers brain damage before being released.
- Li Tian-lu as Lin Ah-lu (林阿祿), patriarch of the Lin family.
- Xin Shufen as Wu Hinomi (Japanese pronunciation of her Chinese name: 吳寬美), sister of Hinoe, and is a nurse in the hospital. She knows Wen-ching through her brother Hinoe. She usually communicates with Wen-ching by writing. She marries Wen-ching after he is released from prison and they have a child.
- Wu Yi-fang as Wu Hinoe (Japanese pronunciation of his Chinese name: 吳寬榮), friend of Wen-Ching, brother of Hinomi, and a school teacher. He establishes an anti-government organization in the mountains following the February 28 incident.
- Ai Tsu-tu as Red Monkey, a small-time Taiwanese gangster who recruits Wen-liang into his criminal smuggling enterprise.
- Lin Juh as Kim-tsua, one of the Shanghainese mobsters responsible for imprisoning Wen-liang.
- Nakamura Ikuyo as Shizuko, a friend of Hinomi's.
- Chan Hung-tze as Mr. Lin. A progressive friend of Hinomi.
- Wu Nien-jen as Mr. Wu, the father of Hinomi and Hinoe.
- Zhang Dachun as Reporter Ho.
- Tsai Chen-nan as singer (cameo appearance).

== Music ==
No.	Name
01	悲情城市～A City Of Sadness
02	Hiromi～Flute Solo
03	文清のテーマ
04	Hiromiのテーマ
05	悲情城市～Variation 2
06	凛～Dedicated To Hou Hsiao-Hsien

Sourced from Xiami Music.

== Production ==
A City of Sadness was filmed on location in Jiufen, a former Japanese and declined gold mining town that continued to operate in the postwar period until the 1960s. Jiufen is located in the northeast of Taiwan, an area isolated from the rest of Taipei County and Yilan County. There are only rough county roads and a local commuter railway line connecting Jiufen to the outside world, which designated a low priority for urban revitalization and land development. Jiufen's hillside communities were constructed before the modern zoning codes were put in place, and therefore provided a small Taiwanese town feeling and atmosphere that symbolizes the historical period that is presented in the plot of A City of Sadness.

Hou remembers Jiufen fondly as he traveled to Jiufen through a tourist gaze when he was young. The shooting of the scenes of train travel to Jiufen particularly evoked his nostalgic rhetoric and joyful memories of a high school trip to Jiufen with his school friends. Hou noted that the train in Taiwan is a very important mode of transportation and he would ride the train a lot. It is very hard for him to forget the connection between him and the trains, so the train tracks appear multiple times in the film.

The film's release brought widespread attention to its shooting locations, particularly Jiufen and Jinguashi. These former mining towns, once in decline, became popular tourist destinations in the 1990s, largely due to the film’s portrayal of their nostalgic atmosphere and historical landscape.

=== Background ===
By the 1980s, the New Taiwanese Cinema movement was moving towards not just creating films for the people of Taiwan, but also for a larger, international audience. Directors Hou Hsiao-hsien and Edward Yang noted that they wanted to emulate the popularity of Hong Kong cinema, which revolved around high quality productions with strong star power to back it up. In A City of Sadness, Hou relied primarily on foreign investment, particularly from Japan. Japanese technology, techniques, and facilities were used in the post-production and resulted in what critic and producer Zhan Hongzhi described as an aspect of "high-quality" that could draw in international viewership. Another aspect of this plan was star power, reflected in one of the principal characters, Wen-ching, being played by then rising Hong Kong film star Tony Leung. The intention behind this was to increase Hong Kong and Overseas Chinese viewership. The film also used an array of different languages, chiefly Taiwanese Hokkien, Cantonese, Japanese, and Shanghainese as a way to promote the cultural diversity of the cast and reflectively, of Taiwan to a global audience, which stands in contrast to many earlier films being only in Mandarin Chinese, due to the governments promotion of Mandarin as the national language.

=== Conceptualization ===
Hou Hsiao-hsien was interested in creating a film that could tell a story about a family, specifically during the 228 Incident and the White Terror by a few reasons. He cited how the death of Chiang Ching-kuo in 1988 and the lifting of martial law the year prior made it an appropriate time to address the 228 Incident, which Hou felt had been covered up by the government. He noted how books were not available on the subject and he wanted to provide a vantage point about the story through the lens of a family.

Hou Hsiao-hsien wrote:

"Everybody knew about the 228 Incident. Nobody would say anything, at least in public, but behind closed doors everyone was talking about it, especially in the Tangwai Movement [..] The 228 Incident was already known, so I was more interested in filming a time of transition, and the changes in a family during a change in regime. This was the main thing I wanted to capture... There's been too much political intervention. We should go back to history itself for a comprehensive reflection, but politicians like to use this tragedy as an ATM, making a withdrawal from it whenever they want. It's awful. So no matter what point of view I took with the film, people would still criticize it. I was filming events that were still taboo, I had a point of view, and no matter what, I was filming from the point of view of people and a family... Of course it's limited by the filmmaker's vision and attitude. I can only present a part of the atmosphere of the time."

According to scriptwriter Chu Tien-Wen's book, the original premise of the film was the reunion of an ex-gangster (which Hou Hsiao-Hsien intended to cast Chow Yun-fat for the role) and his former lover (supposedly played by Yang Li-Hua, the top Taiwanese Opera actress in real-life) in 1970s. Hou and Chu then extended the story to involve substantial flashbacks of the calamity of the woman's family in late 1940s (where the woman was the teenage daughter of Chen Song-Yong's character). They then abandoned the former premise and instead focused on the 1940s' story.

"A City of Sadness" is the first film that Hou Hsiao-hsien conducted extensive historical research on, focusing on reconstructing the emotional landscape and atmosphere of postwar Taiwan. By turning private, intimate family experiences into collective memory, the film indirectly reflects the political reality of the late 1940s. Although it engages with the past, it is not trapped by it. Audiences of different generations and backgrounds have found ways to connect with the characters, prompting diverse interpretations and critical reflection.

=== Film techniques ===
Wen-ching's deafness and muteness began as an expedient way to disguise Tony Leung's inability to speak Taiwanese (or Japanese—the language taught in Taiwan's schools during the 51-year Japanese rule), but wound up being an effective means to demonstrate the brutal insensitivity of Chen Yi's ROC administration. As he communicated through other means (photographs, pen and paper) he is often playing the role of an observer. His inability to speak could mirror Taiwan being silenced by its oppressors.

Sound plays an important role in the film. The opening scene is presented in darkness, with Emperor Hirohito's radio broadcast serving as the only sound. Throughout the film, the use of Japanese language is portrayed as cultural rather than political, reflecting the shared experiences and cultural identity of a particular generation of Taiwanese people. Since most mainlanders did not live through the fifty-one years of Japanese rule, they were generally unable to understand Japanese. As a result, the Taiwanese language spoken by the native characters in A City of Sadness is laced with Japanese words and phrases.

Hou Hsiao-hsien's cinematic style has been described by Nornes and Yeh as having few precedents in the history of cinema and as displaying self-restricting characteristics. They argue that A City of Sadness crystallized Hou's approach to cinematic narration. In the film, Hou frequently restricts the camera to predefined axes and emphasizes the geometric organization of space. One notable example is the hospital lobby sequence, where the arched doorway creates a frame within the film frame. At several points, the camera is placed in a darkened room, further reducing the visible screen space and creating an additional internal frame. Nornes and Yeh argue that this frame-within-a-frame composition works with the geometricization of space to emphasize the graphic qualities of the image.

Hou Hsiao-hsien frequently employs long takes in A City of Sadness. According to Nornes and Yeh, the film consists of approximately 223 shots over a running time of 158 minutes, resulting in an average shot length of about 42.4 seconds. Long takes are among the most distinctive features of Hou's stylistic system and are used with remarkable consistency throughout the film. Combined with ellipsis and restrained camera movement, they contribute to the film's measured rhythm and highly stylized approach to cinematic narration.

The film frequently employs silence and non-verbal forms of expression. Wen-ching's deafness and muteness are used symbolically to represent the suppressed condition of Taiwanese people under the social conditions of the time. Through limited dialogue and silent forms of communication, Hou Hsiao-hsien encourages viewers to reflect on history and actively construct meaning from the film's imagery.

The violent scenes in the incident unfold mainly on a train. Taiwanese protesters resist the Mainlander‑led regime in a blunt way: they question travelers first in Minnan (Hokkien) and then in Taiwanese, and anyone unable to answer is assumed to be an outsider and beaten. Wen‑ching was deaf and dumb, so he could not respond, yet he had normal hearing before he was eight. Relying on his remaining memory, he shouted in Taiwanese, “Me, Taiwanese”, which became his only line in the film and also became a meaningful expression of identity. The identity of Taiwanese can help him escape the danger of the riots, but it also further deepens the contradiction between Taiwanese and outsiders.

The editing of the film subverts the conventional montage school techniques and instead adopts different methods of slow single‑scene progress and fast transition connection, so that the freely narrated story has both omissions and jumps, and the speed is staggered. Therefore, the film implies a sense of desolation, and its historical complex is expressed in a particularly vigorous style.

== Reception and impact ==
=== Critical reception ===
A City of Sadness was a major commercial success in Taiwan, but critics were largely ambivalent toward the work. Having been advertised as a film about the February 28 Incident but never explicitly depicting the event, the film was consequently criticized as politically ambiguous, as well as overly difficult to follow. It was also criticized for not depicting the events of February 28 well, instead presenting the events in a subtle and elliptical manner. It is now widely considered a masterpiece, and has been described as "probably the most significant film to have emerged out of Taiwan's New Cinema."

Richard Brody of The New Yorker argued, "Hou's extraordinarily controlled and well-constructed long takes blend revelation and opacity; his favorite trope is to shoot through doorways, as if straining to capture the action over impassable spans of time." In Time Out, Tony Rayns wrote, "Loaded with detail and elliptically structured to let viewers make their own connections, [...] Hou turns in a masterpiece of small gestures and massive resonance; once you surrender to its spell, the obscurities vanish." Jonathan Rosenbaum lauded Hou as "a master of long takes and complex framing, with a great talent for passionate (though elliptical and distanced) storytelling." In the Chicago Tribune, Dave Kehr declared, "A City of Sadness is a great film, one that will be watched as long as there are people who care about the movies as an art."

The review aggregator website Rotten Tomatoes reported that 100% of critics have given the film a positive review based on 13 reviews, with an average rating of 9.30/10. In the British Film Institute's 2012 Sight & Sound poll, 14 critics and two directors named A City of Sadness one of the ten greatest films ever made, placing it at #117 in the critics' poll and #322 in the directors' poll.

Ping-hui Liao was disappointed that the film did not take advantage of the democratization of Taiwan in the 1980s to produce a film with more aggressive political message. However, Long-ren Qi argues Hou’s work has sparked debates and recognition of Taiwan’s nationalist past. The film is now widely considered a masterpiece, and has been described as "probably the most significant film to have emerged out of Taiwan's New Cinema."

=== History, trauma, and reconciliation ===
Critics have noted how this film (as well as the other 2 films that form the trilogy) started a larger discussion into memory and reconciliation for the 228 Incident and the White Terror on Taiwan. Sylvia Lin commented that "literary, scholarly, historical, personal, and cinematic accounts of the past have mushroomed, as the people in Taiwan feel the urgent need to remember, reconstruct, and rewrite that part of their history.” June Yip noted that the Taiwan Trilogy marked a “autobiographical impulse” to reclaim the history that was now acceptable with the lifting of martial law. Another critic, Jean Ma, also noted the method of displaying trauma by Hou felt "real" and could connect to global audiences everywhere from the "Truth and Reconciliation Commission of South Africa, the desaparecidos of Argentina, and the Armenian massacre as instances in which memory bears the ethical burden of a disavowed or denied history."

=== Resurgence of Taiwanese Hokkien (Taiyu) in film ===
A City of Sadness has been touted as one of the few films to bring Taiwanese Hokkien to prominence and to a global audience. The usage of Taiwanese Hokkien in the film has been noted to be in direct conflict with the then-rule regarding national language in Taiwan. As in the late 1900s, the KMT government encouraged the production of films in Mandarin over Taiwanese. A City of Sadness however, was filmed mostly in Taiwanese Hokkien. Hou Hsiao-hsien's film was allowed by the Government Information Office (the office responsible for government censorship/media) to send a copy of the rough cut to Japan for post-production where it was processed and sent directly to the Venice Film Festival without being authenticated by Taiwanese censors from the GIC. The winning of the Golden Lion and Golden Horse Awards marked a first for Chinese-speaking films, but also were controversial, since A City of Sadness violated then rules about national language usage in films. The success of the film however, renewed interest in Taiwanese Hokkien and became part of the Taiyu Language Movement and started a resurgence of films from Taiwan that utilized minority languages such as Hakka alongside other Taiwanese indigenous languages.

=== Contemporary references ===
The term "City Of Sadness" has been used to describe the state of Hong Kong after the 2014 Umbrella Movement by scholars. Academic Tina L. Rochelle has associated the term with how Hong Kong's trajectory mirrors the trajectory of Taiwan during the 228 Incident and the White Terror. Much like in the case of the 228 Incident, the Umbrella movement was fueled by building resentment of the way Hong Kong citizens were being treated after the 1997 handover of Hong Kong to the People's Republic of China. The cause of anger with citizens was the deterioration of freedoms and rights, the increased feeling of policing, and the imposition of a foreign power's sovereignty over a newly integrated location. This is a characteristic Rochelle highlights as similar in both Taiwan and Hong Kong and is what makes Hong Kong a "modern City of Sadness."

Hou Hsiao‑hsien’s "A City of Sadness" (1989) was digitally restored in 2023. A screening of the film took place at the Louis Zoo Cinema, Hong Kong Arts Centre. The 4K restored version of A City of Sadness was hosted at the Melbourne Taiwan Film Festival 2025.

== Awards and nominations ==
- 46th Venice Film Festival
  - Won: Golden Lion
  - Won: UNESCO Prize
- 1989 Golden Horse Film Festival
  - Won: Best Director – Hou Hsiao-hsien
  - Won: Best Leading Actor – Sung Young Chen
  - Nominated: Best Film
  - Nominated: Best Screenplay – Chu T’ien-wen, Wu Nien-jen
  - Nominated: Best Editing – Liao Ching-sung
- 1989 Kinema Junpo Awards
  - Won: Best Foreign Language Film – Hou Hsiao-hsien
- 1991 Mainichi Film Concours
  - Won: Best Foreign Language Film – Hou Hsiao-hsien
- 1991 Independent Spirit Awards
  - Nominated: Best Foreign Film – Hou Hsiao-hsien
- 1991 Political Film Society
  - Won: Special Award

== See also ==
- List of submissions to the 62nd Academy Awards for Best Foreign Language Film
- List of Taiwanese submissions for the Academy Award for Best Foreign Language Film
