= The Puppetmaster (film) =

1993 Taiwanese film by Hou Hsiao-hsien

- DVD cover
- Chinese: 戲夢人生
- Literal meaning: Dream life
- Hanyu Pinyin: Xìmèng rénshēng
- Directed by: Hou Hsiao-hsien
- Written by: Chu T’ien-wen; Wu Nien-jen
- Produced by: Chiu Fu-sheng
- Starring: Lim Giong; Li Tian-lu; Tsai Chen-nan
- Narrated by: Li Tian-lu
- Cinematography: Mark Lee Ping-bin
- Edited by: Liao Ching-sung
- Music by: Chen Ming-chang
- Production companies: ERA; Nian Dai International
- Release date: 1993
- Running time: 142 minutes
- Country: Taiwan
- Language: Hokkien

The Puppetmaster is a 1993 Taiwanese film directed by Hou Hsiao-hsien. Based on the memoirs of Li Tian-lu, Taiwan's most celebrated puppeteer, this story covers the years from Li's birth in 1909 to the end of Japan's fifty-year occupation of Taiwan in 1945.

== Plot ==
The film tells the story of Li Tian-lu (1910-1998), who becomes a master puppeteer but is faced with demands to turn his skills to propaganda during the Japanese occupation of Taiwan in World War II. Scenes from his childhood and early adulthood are intercut with puppet performances and newly-filmed interviews of Li recounting his life as he's swept up in Taiwan's tumultuous history.

The film is the second in Hou's trilogy of historical films about Taiwan in the 20th century. A City of Sadness (1989) covered the four years between the end of World War II and the retreat of the Kuomintang to Taiwan in 1949, when Taipei was declared the “temporary” capital of the Republic of China. Good Men, Good Women (1995) later covered forty additional years of Taiwanese history, from the 50s to the present.

== Cast ==
| Actor | Role |
|---|---|
| Li Tian-lu | Himself |
| Lim Giong | Li Tian-lu (young) |
| Tsai Chen-nan | Ko Meng-dang (father) |
| Yang Li-yin | Lai Hwat (stepmother) |
| Vicky Wei | Lei Tzu |

== Production ==
The Puppetmaster was photographed in Fuzhou, the capital of southeastern China's Fujian province, and in Taiwan. The film is structured around a series of ellipsis, which Hou has compared to traditional Chinese opera: "It simply gives you a scene without much of a clear narrative, unlike Western drama where all the elements must be put in place. Ellipsis and other indirect narrative methods are, ironically, more clear-cut and to the point. It all depends on how you master these methods."

For the shots showing Li himself, he usually appears at a particular location right after it has been introduced dramatically. The shifts between narrative and interview footage and between past and present are frequently accompanied by some narrative clarification that facilitates a change in the audience's perspective. Critic Jonathan Rosenbaum observed that "the only rough parallel I can think of in Hollywood filmmaking is the use of real-life 'witnesses' in Warren Beatty's Reds, but here it's as if John Reed himself, not people remembering him, suddenly appeared on-screen."

Hou has stated that through this film he was “exploring the values of traditional culture which [Taiwan has] lost...We have distanced ourselves from nature and man has become like a puppet – he has lost his power to be his own master. The Puppetmaster represents the lament which I feel for the loss of our culture."

The Puppetmaster premiered in the U.S. at the New York Film Festival in 1993, but like most of Hou's films, it has never been commercially released in America. It was rarely screened until it anchored a comprehensive Hou Hsiao-Hsien retrospective that toured North American cinematheques and museums in the fall and winter of 2014.

== Reception ==
Jim Hoberman of The Village Voice hailed it as the best film of 1993 and one of the ten best of the 1990s, writing later that "it was for The Puppetmaster that Taiwanese master filmmaker Hou Hsiao-hsien first developed a startlingly advanced form of montage that has been compared to the movement of clouds drifting across the sky."

Jonathan Rosenbaum of The Chicago Reader also selected The Puppetmaster as one of the ten best films of the decade, adding that "The Puppermaster is only one of four masterpieces made by Hou in the 90s" and that Hou was "one of the two greatest working filmmakers in the world right now, along with [Abbas] Kiarostami."

Critic and director Kent Jones also praised The Puppetmaster alongside Hou's 1990s work, writing that "the density of Hou's concentration within any given shot is apparently infinite, and there's no such thing as an 'insert' or a 'cutaway' in his work. Which is why a jump in time or a sudden juxtaposition can feel immense. Starting with The Puppetmaster, the logic of each film is built around the effects of these breaks and juxtapositions." Jones also discussed the lack of distribution for Hou's films, observing that "in America [Hou] seems to have become a marked man before making the transition from cult phenomenon to arthouse favorite...Prompting an artist of this magnitude to make his work more accessible is like asking [Karlheinz] Stockhausen to write catchier tunes, or asking John Ashbery to appeal to readers of USA Today. It doesn't make any sense. Because right now, it doesn't get much better than Hou Hsiao-hsien." British Film Institute ranked the film at No. 11 on its list of "90 great films of the 1990s".

== Awards ==
The Puppetmaster was the first Taiwanese film to enter competition at Cannes where it won the Jury Prize at the 1993 Cannes Film Festival and the FIPRESCI Prize at the Istanbul International Film Festival. It has also received the Georges Delerue Award for Best Soundtrack/Sound Design at Film Fest Gent in 1993.
