= Wu Nien-jen =

Taiwanese scriptwriter, film director and author

- 吳念真
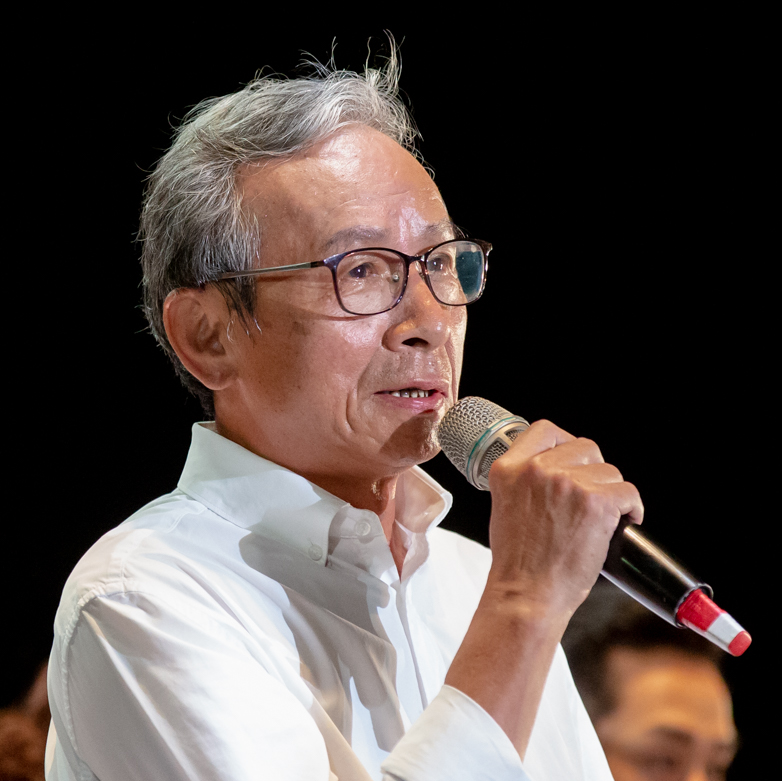
- Born: 5 August 1952 (age 74); Houtong, Ruifang Township, Taipei County, Taiwan (modern-day Ruifang, New Taipei)
- Education: Fu Jen Catholic University
- Awards: Golden Horse Awards – Best Original Screenplay; 1981 Classmates; 1984 Second Spring of Mr. Muo; 1990 Song of the Exile; 1992 Hill of No Return; Best Adapted Screenplay; 1986 Father-son Relationship

Wu Nien-jen (Chinese: 吳念真; pinyin: Wú Niànzhēn; Pe̍h-ōe-jī: Gô͘ Liām-chin; born Chinese: 吳文欽; pinyin: Wú Wēnqīn; Pe̍h-ōe-jī: Gô͘ Bûn-khim; 5 August 1952) is a Taiwanese screenwriter, director, and writer. He is one of the most prolific and highly regarded scriptwriters in Taiwan and a leading member of the New Taiwanese Cinema, although he has also acted in a number of films. He starred in Edward Yang's 2000 film Yi Yi. Wu is a well-known supporter of the Democratic Progressive Party and has filmed commercials for the party.

== Early and personal life ==
Wu was born into a coal miner's family in 1952 and raised in the mining town of Jiufen. He went into the army after high school, and after being discharged in 1976, went to work at a library while pursuing a degree in accounting at the Fu Jen Catholic University night school. He started writing short stories for newspapers in 1975, when he was still an accounting major. After penning his first screenplay in 1978, Wu entered Central Motion Picture Corporation as a creative supervisor and worked with several leading Taiwanese New Wave directors such as Hou Hsiao-hsien and Edward Yang. Wu has since written more than 70 screenplays that were made into films, and has become one of the leading artists of the Taiwanese Cinema of the 1980s. Wu has also set the record for winning the most Golden Horse Awards to date (Taiwan's Film Awards), including a collaboration with the internationally acclaimed Hong Kong director Ann Hui on her film Song of Exile, a.k.a. Ketu Qiuhen (1990). His novels and screenplays have also made him one of Taiwan's best-selling authors.

Currently, Wu runs his own production company, Wu's Productions and actively writes, directs, produces and performs in commercials and television programs. He is a published novelist, author, writer and Taiwanese filmmaker.

Wu's son, Chien-Ting Wu, is also an actor in Taiwan, and has starred in TV shows such as Apple in Your Eye and films such as Arvin Chen's Will You Still Love Me Tomorrow (2013).

== Writing ==
=== Fiction ===
Wu started writing short stories while he was still a college student at the Fu Jen Catholic University in Taipei studying accounting, publishing his first short story in a newspaper at the age of seventeen. In an interview with film scholar Michael Berry, Wu stated that "I was already working in Taipei at that time, and the extra money I earned from publishing my stories in the newspapers actually added up to more than my salary, which made me very happy and inspired me to keep on writing." He started making a name for himself on the Taiwanese literary scene with a series of popular and commercially successful short story collections, including Grab on to Spring (抓住一個春天) (Zhuazhu yige chuntian)(1977). Other popular novels by Wu include: Special of the Day (特別的一天) (1988), Taiwan, Tell The Truth (臺灣念真情) (2002), Year-old a person to travel (八歲一個人去旅行) (2003), These people, those things (這些人，那些事) (2010) and Taiwan, Say the Truth (台灣念真情) (2011).

One of Wu's role models and mentors as a writer was Cheng Ching-wen, who wrote the short story collection Three-Legged Horse. Wu said of the mentorship provided by Cheng:

"Cheng Ching-wen was really a kind of role model for me. I was twenty-something when I was discharged from the military. At the time, it was extremely difficult to find a job if one was not well educated. I knew that taking on an apprenticeship to learn a trade would require much more time than just entering the university, so I decided to do the latter. I knew Cheng Ching-wen and consulted him when I was trying to decide what to study and which universities to apply to. Cheng was working in a bank and writing fiction in his spare time. His job at the bank provided financial stability for him and his family while writing accommodated his own interests. He once told me, "You can only truly enjoy writing as an act of literary creation when there is no financial burden hanging over your head." This really resonated with me, and I decided to apply for something that would eventually help me to find a job - business school became my first choice. But I never went into business because by my senior year I was already working for CMPC, writing screenplays. I did eventually finish my studies, however."

=== Screenwriting ===
Wu's storytelling talents and penchant for realistic dialogue caught the attention of a Taiwanese movie studio named Central Motion Picture Corporation (CMPC), which hired him as a scriptwriter and creative supervisor while he was still finishing his college studies. By 1981, Wu had won his first Golden Horse Best Screenplay Award for writing Ching-chieh Lin's Classmates (Tong ban tong xue) (1981).

Wu would go on to win 5 more Golden Horse "Best Original Screenplay", "Best Adapted Screenplay" or "Best Original Film Song" awards later on in his career, for the films: Lao Mo de di er ge chun tian (1984) (Best Original Screenplay, 1984), The Two of Us (1987) (Best Adapted Screenplay, 1987), Kun Hao Chen's Gui hua xiang (1987) (Best Original Film Song, shared with Yang Chen), Anne Hui's Song of the Exile (1990) (Best Original Screenplay, 1990), and Toon Wang's Wu yan de shan qiu (1992)(Best Original Screenplay, 1992). Wu also ended up winning a Best Screenplay Award from the 1993 Asia-Pacific Film Festival for Toon Wang's historical film, Wu yan de shan qiu (1992). In total, Wu ended up writing over 90 feature film screenplays and numerous TV dramas.

Other notable screenplays Wu has written (some of which are considered integral films of the Taiwanese New Wave or New Taiwanese Cinema movement) include Edward Yang's feature directorial debut, That Day, on the Beach (1983), Hou Hsiao-hsien's films The Puppetmaster (1993), A City of Sadness (1989), and Dust in the Wind (1986), and films directed by Anne Hui including Song of Exile (1990) and My American Grandson (1990), and Taiwanese commercial hits Old Mo's Second Spring (1984) and The Dull Ice Flower (1989). Wu also wrote the screenplay for all the short film segments of the Taiwanese New Wave omnibus film The Sandwich Man (1983) based on stories from the collection by Huang Chunming, with segments directed by Hou Hsiao-hsien, Tseng Chuang-Hsiang and Wan Ren.

== Directed films ==
Wu made his directorial debut in 1994 with A Borrowed Life, which he also wrote. The award-winning movie commemorates Wu's Japanese-educated, hard-working coal-miner father. The film won the Grand Prize (Prize of the City of Torino for Best Film - International Feature Film Competition) at the Torino Film Festival in Italy, a FIPRESCI/NETPAC Award at the 1995 Singapore International Film Festival and the Silver Alexander Award as well as the FIPRESCI Prize (International Federation of Film Critics Award) at the 1994 Thessaloniki Film Festival in Greece. The film also won a Best Original Film Song award (given to Tsai Chen-nan (composer/performer) and Chen Che-cheng (composer) for the song "The Wandering Song") at the 1994 Golden Horse Film Festival and Awards, where it was also nominated for Best Feature Film, Best Leading Actor (Tsai Chen-nan), Best Original Screenplay (Wu Nien-jen), and Best Sound Effects (Tu Duu-chih). Martin Scorsese also has cited A Borrowed Life (Tò-sàng) as one of his favorite films, and ranked it one of the best of the 1990s.

In 1996, Wu wrote and directed his second film Buddha Bless America, a.k.a. 太平天國, Taiping Tianguo (1996), a political satire set in the 1960s which was also nominated and in competition for the prestigious Golden Lion at the 1996 Venice Film Festival.

In 2011, Wu directed a short film segment entitled "A Grocery Called Forever" in the Taiwanese anthology film 10+10 (2011), starring Yung-Feng Lee.

== Acting ==
Besides directing and writing, Wu appears in film cameos from time to time. However, it was not until he acted in several beer and food product commercials that his true acting talent was discovered. He was cast as the lead ("NJ") in Edward Yang's film, Yi Yi (2000), which was critically acclaimed and won several international awards (including Best Director for Yang at Cannes). Wu also collaborated with Yang in the past by being an actor in Yang's previous films Taipei Story (1985) (as the Taxi Driver) and Mahjong (1996) (as the Gangster in a Black Suit) and the writer of the screenplay for Yang's first feature film as a director, That Day, On The Beach (1983). Wu also appeared as an actor in Hou Hsiao-hsien's films Daughter of the Nile (1987) and A City of Sadness (1989).

In 2014, Wu appeared in the film The Boar King and in 2013, Wu played the character "Master Silly Mortal" in the film Zone Pro Site, the 9th highest grossing Taiwanese domestic film of all time. In 2013, Wu played the older mobster character Ho Cheng-Chih in Chien-yu Yu's 2013 (but released 2016) gangster film, Mole of Life. In 2009, Wu had a role as Chen Ting-Ho on the Taiwanese TV series The Year of Happiness and Love (2009-2010). Wu also played the Tour Bus Driver in Huai-en Chen's Island Etude (2006). In 2000, the same year he appeared in Yi Yi, Wu also acted in Chih-yu Hung's Pure Accidents (2000). Wu also appeared as an actor in Buddha Bless America (1996), which he also wrote and directed, and acted in several Taiwanese New Wave films of the 1980s, including Kun Hao Chen's My Favorite Season (1985) and Out of the Blue (1984) and Ko I-chen's I Love Mary (1984).

== Filmography ==
=== Director ===
- A Borrowed Life (1994)
- 太平天國 Buddha Bless America (1996)
- A Grocery Called Forever in anthology film, 10+10 (2011)

=== Executive producer ===
- Somewhere I Have Never Traveled (2009)

=== Screenplays ===
- The Puppetmaster (Dir. Hou Hsiao-hsien, 1993)
- Song of the Exile (Dir. Anne Hui, 1990)
- My American Grandson (Dir. Anne Hui, 1990)
- A City of Sadness (Dir. Hou Hsiao-hsien, 1989)
- Dust in the Wind (Dir. Hou Hsiao-hsien, 1986)
- That Day on the Beach (Dir. Edward Yang, 1983)
- The Sandwich Man (Dir. Hou Hsiao-hsien, Tseng Chuang-Hsiang and Wan Ren, 1983)

=== Actor ===
- The Year of Happiness and Love (TV Series)(Dir. Various, 2009)
- Yi Yi (Dir. Edward Yang, 2000)
- Mahjong (Dir. Edward Yang, 1996)
- A City of Sadness (Dir. Hou Hsiao-hsien, 1989)
- Daughter of the Nile (Dir. Hou Hsiao-hsien, 1987)
- Taipei Story (Dir. Edward Yang, 1985)
- That Day, on the Beach (Dir. Edward Yang, 1983)

== Bibliography ==
- 台灣念真情 (2011)
- 這些人，那些事 (2010)
- 八歲一個人去旅行 (2003)
- 臺灣念真情 (2002)
- 特別的一天 (1988)
- 抓住一個春天 (1977)
