= Tsai Chen-nan =

Taiwanese actor and singer

- 蔡振南
- Born: 26 July 1954 (age 72); Xingang, Chiayi County, Taiwan
- Occupations: actor and singer

Tsai Chen-nan (Chinese: 蔡振南; pinyin: Cài Zhènnán; Pe̍h-ōe-jī: Chhòa Chín-lâm; born 26 July 1954) is a Taiwanese actor and singer.

Tsai was invited by the Hsinkang Foundation of Culture and Education to perform in Xingang, Chiayi, by the organization founder Chen Chin-huang, who sought to mitigate the effects that a widespread gambling craze had on his hometown. Tsai performed alongside the Cloud Gate Dance Theater led by fellow Xingang native Lin Hwai-min in June 1987. Tsai won the Golden Melody Award for best Taiwanese vocalist, and the Golden Melody Award for Album of the Year in 1997. His Hokkien pop songs have received attention from China, where he has been considered a "green performer," supportive of Taiwan independence.

Tsai appeared in several films directed by Hou Hsiao-hsien at the start of his acting career. He portrayed a gang leader in Comes the Black Dog (2004), and Gatao (2015). In 2010, Tsai won best actor at the Rome Asian Film Festival for his portrayal of a police officer in Tears. Tsai was a hunter and love interest of Lu Yi-ching's character, a widow, in Kuo Chen-ti's The Boar King (2014). The next year, he portrayed Chang San-lang, director of the National Theater and Concert Hall, Taipei, in Kara-Orchestra, and uncle of Austin Lin's character in The Missing Piece. In 2017, he appeared in the television drama A Boy Named Flora A alongside Crowd Lu, and was named best actor at the Asian Television Awards for his role on She's Family.

== Selected filmography ==
- A City of Sadness (1989)
- Dust of Angels (1992)
- The Puppetmaster (1993)
- A Borrowed Life (1994)
- Heartbreak Island (1995)
- Good Men, Good Women (1995)
- Connection by Fate (1998)
- Betelnut Beauty (2001)
- The Year of Happiness and Love (2009)
- Tears (2010)
- Monga Yao Hui (2011)
- Garden of Life (2012)
- The Ghost Tales (2012)
- When a Wolf Falls in Love with a Sheep (2012)
- What Is Love (2012)
- Gatao (2015)
- Kara-Orchestra (2015)
- The Missing Piece (2015)
- Youth Power (2015)
- Shia Wa Se (2016)
- She's Family (2017)
- A Boy Named Flora A (2017)
- Man in Love (2021)
- Marry My Dead Body (2023)
