= Jack Kao =

Taiwanese actor

- Born: 23 April 1958 (age 67); Taiwan
- Occupation: Actor

Chinese name
- Traditional Chinese: 高捷
- Simplified Chinese: 高捷
Transcriptions
Southern Min
- Hokkien POJ: Ko Chia̍t
- Musical career
- Also known as: Kao Jai

Jack Kao (Chinese: 高捷; pinyin: Gāo Jié; Pe̍h-ōe-jī: Ko Chia̍t, born 23 April 1958) is a Taiwanese actor.

== Career ==
He began his career in the late 1980s films of Hou Hsiao-hsien. Kao credits his success to the many real-life gangsters he knew when he was young. He appeared in City of Sadness, a film about Taiwan's White Terror, which received the 1989 Golden Lion award the Venice Film Festival. Another of his films about that same period, 2009's Prince of Tears, was also included in the festival. His 2001 film Millennium Mambo was featured in the Film Society of Lincoln Center's 2016 retrospective "Going Steadi: 40 Years of Steadicam".

== Selected filmography ==
- Daughter of the Nile (1987) - Lin Hsiao-fang, the brother
- Rouge of The North (1988)
- A City of Sadness (1989) - Wen Leung
- Mudan niao (1990)
- Island of Fire (1990) - Ho
- Wawa (1991)
- Dust of Angels (1992)
- Wu hu si hai (1992) - Fan Yat Wai
- Treasure Island (1993)
- Sheng nu de yu wang (1993)
- What Price Survival (1994) - Jie
- In The Heat of Summer (1994)
- Dian zhi bing bing: Qing nian gan tan (1994) - Chan Wei-Cheng
- Hao nan hao nu (1995) - Ah Wei
- Yi qian ling yi ye zhi meng zhong ren (1995) - Kwok Ping-Tak
- Te jing ji xian feng (1995) - Jiang Tian
- Modern Republic (1995)
- Goodbye South, Goodbye (1996) - Kao
- Go do gaai bei (1997) - Zang
- Flowers of Shanghai (1998) - Luo
- Du xia 1999 (1998) - Ma Kau Wan
- The Return of the Condor Heroes (1998, TV Series) - Golden Wheel Monk (1998)
- Sing yuet tung wa (1999) - Gene
- Xiang si chen xianzai (2000) - Jie
- Time and Tide (2000) - Police Officer
- Millennium Mambo (2001) - Jack
- Tai Bei wan 9 zao 5 (2002) - Brother Jack
- Moon Child (2003)
- Yau doh lung fu bong (2004) - Mona's Dad
- Gu lian hua (2005)
- Lian ren (2005)
- Ai li si de jing zi (2005)
- Liu lang shen gou ren (2007) - Yellow Bull
- Parking (2008)
- Shinjuku Incident (2009)
- Crazy Racer (2009)
- The Sniper (2009) - Barber
- Feng kuang de sai che (2009)
- Ghosted (2009) - Chen Fu
- Xin Su shi jian (2009) - Gao Jie
- Sun cheung sau (2009) - Tao
- Ba... ni hao ma (2009) - Father (segment "Wish")
- Lei wangzi (2009) - Ah-Chang
- Yi xi zhi di (2009) - Master Lin
- Au Revoir Taipei (2010) - Kai's father
- Lie yan (2010) - Editor
- Red Nights (2010) - Mister Ko
- Wo, 19 sui (2010)
- 10+10 (2011) - Chou Wei-te's father (segment "Reverberation")
- Dian Na Chà (2011)
- Flying Swords of Dragon Gate (2011) - Tartar
- Coming Back (2011)
- Bad Girls (2012) - Matthew
- Zombie-108 (2012) - Swat Commander
- Good-for-Nothing Heros (2012)
- Anywhere Somewhere Nowhere (2012)
- Witness (2012) - Lao Song
- Black & White (2012)
- Taipei Factory (2013) - (segment "Mr. Chang's New Address")
- Scandals (2013)
- Unbeatable (2013) - Lin Yuan Xiang
- My Lucky Star (2013) - Mr. Gao
- The Break-Up Artist (2014) - Hsieh Chun-Tang
- But Always (2014) - Anran's Father
- Zombie Fight Club (2014) - Wu Ming (Teacher / Prison Warden)
- The Crossing (2014)
- One Night in Taipei (2015)
- Two Thumbs Up (2015) - Warden
- Massagist (2015) - Chia-Ching
- The Unbearable Lightness of Inspector Fan (2015)
- Lion Dancing 2 (2015)
- Wild City (2015) - King
- The Crossing (2015)
- The Assassin (2015)
- Inside or Outside (2016)
- Spicy Hot in Love (2016) - Song Ming
- Meng xiang he huo ren (2016)
- One Night Only (2016) - Barth
- Jing xin po (2016) - Ben Lam
- Tian ma (2016) - Mai Zhongren
- Shaowu the Bad (2017) - Keiko
- Missing Johnny (2017) - Uncle Jiao
- Jing Cheng 81 hao 2 (2017) - Ji Chunlong
- Two Wrongs Make a Right (2017) - Qin Rui's father
- Tian sheng bu dui (2017) - Qin Kwai
- Jiao tou 2: Wang zhe zai qi (2018) - President Gui
- Cities of Last Things (2018)
- Project Gutenberg (2018) - Thai General
- Song of the Assassins (2018)
- Kuang tu (2018) - Chen Mu
- Pegasus: On the Brink (2018)
- The Big Shot (2019)
- Han Dan (2019) - Hsieh Chun-Hao
- Gang of Bra (2019)
- The Longest Shot (2019)
