= Chen Hwai-en =

Taiwanese film director and cinematographer

Chen Hwai-en (Chinese: 陳懷恩; born 1959) is a Taiwanese film director and cinematographer.

He began working with Hou Hsiao-hsien in 1983, as a script supervisor. Chen's debut feature film Island Etude (2006) was shown at the Taipei Film Festival, and served as Taiwan's submission to the 80th Academy Awards for the Academy Award for Best Foreign Language Film after Lust, Caution was rejected.

A few of Chen's documentaries have been funded by entrepreneur Tung Tsu-hsien, namely The Untrammeled Traveler (2011) about writer Yu Kuang-chung, and Man-fei (2017), titled for its subject, choreographer Lo Man-fei.
