= 49th Golden Horse Awards =

Award ceremony for Chinese-language films of 2011 and 2012

- Promotional poster designed by Jimmy Liao
- Date: November 24, 2012
- Site: Luodong Cultural Factory, Yilan County, Taiwan
- Hosted by: Huang Bo and Bowie Tsang
- Preshow hosts: Yang Chien-pei and Emerson Tsai
- Organized by: Taipei Golden Horse Film Festival Executive Committee

Highlights
- Best Feature Film: Beijing Blues
- Best Director: Johnnie To; Life Without Principle
- Best Actor: Sean Lau; Life Without Principle
- Best Actress: Gwei Lun-mei; Girlfriend, Boyfriend
- Most awards: Life Without Principle (3); Beijing Blues (3)
- Most nominations: Girlfriend, Boyfriend (7); Mystery (7)

Television in Taiwan
- Channel: TTV

The 49th Golden Horse Awards (Mandarin:第49屆金馬獎) took place on November 24, 2012, at the Luodong Cultural Factory in Yilan County, Taiwan.

== Winners and nominees ==
Winners are listed first and highlighted in boldface.

**Best Feature Film**: **Beijing Blues**; Mystery; Life Without Principle; Girlfriend, Boyfriend; The Bullet Vanishes	**Best Short Film**: **The Home Gleaners**; 6th March; The Present; My Graduation Travel
**Best Documentary**: **China Heavyweight**; Hand in Hand; Voyage in Time; Money and Honey	**Best Animation Feature** -
**Best Director**: **Johnnie To — Life Without Principle**; Gao Qunshu — Beijing Blues; Lou Ye — Mystery; Yang Ya-che — Girlfriend, Boyfriend; Doze Niu — Love	**Best New Director**: **Chang Jung-chi — Touch of the Light**; Yang Yi-chien and Jim Wang — Cha Cha for Twins; Fung Kai — Din Tao: Leader of the Parade; Hero Lin — Silent Code; Tsai Yueh-hsun — Black & White Episode I: The Dawn of Assault
**Best Leading Actor**: **Sean Lau — Life Without Principle**; Nick Cheung — Nightfall; Joseph Chang — Girlfriend, Boyfriend; Chapman To — Vulgaria; Nicholas Tse — The Viral Factor	**Best Leading Actress**: **Gwei Lun-mei — Girlfriend, Boyfriend**; Bai Baihe — Love Is Not Blind; Hao Lei — Mystery; Denise Ho — Life Without Principle; Sandrine Pinna — Touch of the Light
**Best Supporting Actor**: **Ronald Cheng — Vulgaria**; Wu Gang — White Deer Plain; Bryan Chang — Girlfriend, Boyfriend; Kaiser Chuang — Stilt; Chapman To — Diva	**Best Supporting Actress**: **Liang Jing — Design of Death**; Dada Chan — Vulgaria; Amber Kuo — Love; Ivy Chen — Love; Mavis Fan — The Silent War
**Best New Performer**: **Qi Xi — Mystery**; Huang Pei-jia — Cha Cha for Twins; Guo Chun-mei — Flying Dragon, Dancing Phoenix; Zhang Zixuan — Love Is Not Blind; Erek Lin — Starry Starry Night
**Audience Choice Award**: **Girlfriend, Boyfriend**; Beijing Blues; Mystery; Life Without Principle; The Bullet Vanishes	**FIPRESCI Prize** **(award for first and second features)**: **Touch of the Light**
**Outstanding Taiwanese Filmmaker of the Year**: **Huang Yu-siang**; Liao Su-jen; Jimmy Huang; Chen Po-wen	**Lifetime Achievement Award**: **Shih Chun**
