= Yang Ya-che =

Taiwanese director (born 1971)

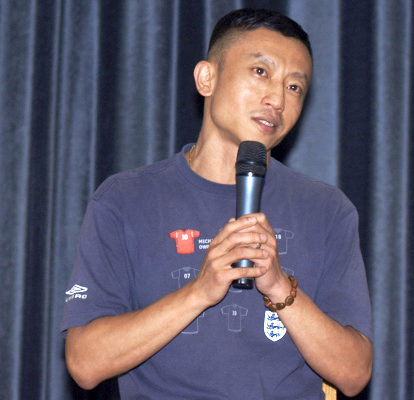
- Yang in 2012
- Born: 17 July 1971 (age 55); Banqiao, Taipei County, Taiwan
- Occupations: Director and screenwriter

Yang Ya-che (Chinese: 楊雅喆; pinyin: Yáng Yǎché; born 17 July 1971) is a Taiwanese film and television director and screenwriter. He was nominated for the Taipei Golden Horse Awards for Best Director two times, for Girlfriend, Boyfriend (女朋友·男朋友) in 2012 and The Bold, the Corrupt, and the Beautiful (血觀音) in 2017.

== Early life ==
Born in Banqiao, New Taipei City, Taiwan, Yang Ya-che graduated from the Taipei Municipal Zhongzheng Senior High School and the Department of Mass Communication at Tamkang University. His works cover a wide range of genres, including stage plays, television dramas, serial dramas, documentaries, and films. Yang Ya-che's father was a fortune teller. While he originally studied French at Tamkang University, he later switched to the Department of Mass Communication to further pursue his interest in journalism and film.

== Career ==
In 2002, Yang won both the Best Director and Best Screenwriter awards for television drama, Wei zhang tian tang (違章天堂), at the Golden Bell Awards. In 2008, his first feature film, Orz Boyz! (囧男孩), was a box office success and became the runner-up in Taiwanese films of the year. It also sold the rights to Japan, becoming the first Taiwanese film purchased by NHK in the past decade. In 2012, his second feature film, Girlfriend, Boyfriend, won multiple film awards, including the Audience Choice Award and the Best Actress at the 49th Taipei Golden Horse Awards. His third feature film, The Bold, the Corrupt, and the Beautiful won the Best Feature Film award at the 54th Taipei Golden Horse Awards.

The female lead characters in Yang's television dramas are frequent Best Actress winners at Golden Bell Awards: June Tsai won the Best Actress award in a TV series at the 36th Golden Bell Awards for Farbidden Love (逆女); Hsieh Yue-hsia won the Best Actress award in a TV series at the 37th Golden Bell Awards for Wei zhang tian tang (違章天堂); and Wanfang won the Best Supporting Actress award in a mini-series at the 43rd Golden Bell Awards for No Practice Love Song (不愛練習曲). The main female characters in his three feature films all won awards at the Taipei Golden Horse Awards: Ivy Mei won the Best Supporting Actress award for Orz Boyz! (囧男孩); Gwei Lun-mei won the Best Actress award for Girlfriend, Boyfriend; and Kara Wai and Vicky Chen won the Best Actress and Best Supporting Actress awards, respectively, for The Bold, the Corrupt, and the Beautiful. For this reason, Yang Ya-che is acclaimed as the "Queen Maker."

In March 2022, Yang became the chairman of Mirror TV after the previous chairman, Lee Yung-feng, founder of the Paperwindmill Theatre, resigned from the position just 11 days after Chen Chien-ping was abruptly removed. Zheng You was announced as the new chairman of Mirror TV two weeks after Yang's appointment.

In May 2022, Yang announced that he would cancel his Netflix subscription due to a Facebook post by Netflix that made fun of Taiwan's inability to purchase rapid COVID-19 tests, which sparked outrage among netizens who accused him of double standards.

== Filmography and publication ==
=== Novel ===
- 2002 - Blue Gate Crossing (藍色大門) - Co-authored with Yee Chi-yen - NewRain Publisher - ISBN 9789577337573. Eslite Bookstore Top 50 Readers Award
- 2012 - Girlfriend, Boyfriend (女朋友・男朋友) - Co-authored with Wanjinyou- China Times Co. ISBN 9789571355832.
- 2012 - Director's Story Book (導演的故事本) - Business Weekly Column

=== Feature film ===
- 2002 - Blue Gate Crossing (藍色大門) - Assistant Director
- 2008 - Orz Boyz! (囧男孩) - Director, Screenwriter
- 2012 - Girlfriend, Boyfriend (女朋友・男朋友) - Director, Screenwriter
- 2017 - The Bold, the Corrupt, and the Beautiful (血觀音) - Director, Screenwriter

=== TV series ===
- 2006 - Dangerous Mind (危險心靈)- Assistant Director - Taiwan Public Television Service
- 2021 - The Magician on the Skywalk (天橋上的魔術師) - Director, Screenwriter - Taiwan Public Television Service

=== Mini series ===
2001

- Farbidden Love (逆女) - Screenwriter - Taiwan Television
- Watching the Moon (看月娘) - Director, Screenwriter - Chinese Television System

2002

- Wei zhang tian tang (違章天堂) - Director, Screenwriter - Public Television Service
- The Pigeon King (鴿子王) - Director, Screenwriter - Public Television Service

2003

- Spring has Come (春天來了) - Director, Screenwriter - Star Chinese Channel

2004

- Guo Le Tian Qiao, Kan Jian Hai/ (過了天橋，看見海) - Director, Screenwriter - Public Television Service
- Youth (青春) - Director, Screenwriter - Public Television Service

2005

- Domain of Murder (偵探物語) - Director - Public Television Service

2006

- Fortunately, We Are all still Here (還好，我們都還在這裡) - Director, Screenwriter - Public Television Service
- Lonely Game (寂寞的遊戲) - Director, Screenwriter - Public Television Service

2008

- No Practice Love Song (不愛練習曲) - Director, Screenwriter - Public Television Service

== Film Awards Jury ==
- 50th Golden Horse Film Awards - Shortlist and Finalist Jury
- 55th Golden Horse Film Awards - Shortlist and Finalist Jury
- 23th Taipei Film Festival Awards - Shortlist and Finalist Jury

== Social participation and political stance ==
- Supported the New Power Party and the Democratic Progressive Party in the 2018 election
- Advocates for the Anti-Nuclear Movement and the Sunflower Movement's Anti-Cross-Strait Service Trade Agreement
- Supports Anti-Nuclear Movement with his short video campaign, Kadao tianwang (卡到天王)
- Stands in Solidarity with the Wang Family against the Shilin District Wenlin Yuan Urban Renewal Project
- Supports Anti-Media Monopoly Movement
- Supports Dapu Incident
- At the 2017 Golden Horse Awards Ceremony, Yang Ya-che supported the Labor Union Association and waved Indigenous Activist "No One is Outsider" towel on stage.

== Awards and honors ==
=== Golden Bell Awards ===
2001

- 36th Golden Bell Award for Best Writing for a Miniseries or Television Film - Farbidden Love (逆女) - Nominated

2002

- 37th Golden Bell Award for Best Directing for a Miniseries or Television Film - Wei zhang tian tang (違章天堂) - Won
- 37th Golden Bell Award for Best Writing for a Miniseries or Television Film - Wei zhang tian tang (違章天堂) - Won

2003

- 38th Golden Bell Award for Best Writing for a Miniseries or Television Film - Spring has Come (春天來了) - Nominated

2005

- 40th Golden Bell Award for Best Directing for a Miniseries or Television Film - Youth (青春) - Nominated

2007

- 42nd Golden Bell Award for Best Directing for a Miniseries or Television Film - Lonely Game (寂寞的遊戲) - Nominated
- 42nd Golden Bell Award for Best Directing for a Miniseries or Television Film - Lonely Game (寂寞的遊戲) - Nominated

2008

- 43rd Golden Bell Award for Best Directing for a Miniseries or Television Film - No Practice Love Song (不愛練習曲) - Nominated

2021

- 56th Golden Bell Award for Best Directing for a Television Series - The Magician on the Skywalk (天橋上的魔術師) - Won
- 56th Golden Bell Award for Best Writing for a Television Series - The Magician on the Skywalk (天橋上的魔術師) - Nominated

=== Taipei Film Awards ===
2008

- 10th Taipei Film Awards - Best Director of a Feature Film - Orz Boyz! (囧男孩) - Won

2012

- 14th Taipei Film Awards - Press Award - Girlfriend, Boyfriend (女朋友・男朋友) - Won

2018

- 20th Taipei Film Awards Best Screenplay - The Bold, the Corrupt, and the Beautiful (血觀音) - Won

=== Golden Horse Awards ===
2008

- 45th Golden Horse Awards Best Original Screenplay - Orz Boyz! (囧男孩) - Nominated

2012

- 49th Golden Horse Awards Best Director - Girlfriend, Boyfriend (女朋友・男朋友) - Nominated
- 49th Golden Horse Awards Best Original Screenplay - Girlfriend, Boyfriend (女朋友・男朋友) - Nominated

2017

- 54th Golden Horse Awards Best Director - The Bold, the Corrupt, and the Beautiful (血觀音) - Nominated
- 54th Golden Horse Awards Best Original Screenplay - The Bold, the Corrupt, and the Beautiful (血觀音) - Nominated
- 54th Golden Horse Awards Best Feature Film Drama - The Bold, the Corrupt, and the Beautiful (血觀音) - Won

=== Asia-Pacific Film Festival ===
2012

- 55th Asia Pacific Film Festival Best Screenplay - Girlfriend, Boyfriend (女朋友・男朋友) - Nominated
