= Golden Horse Award for Best Leading Actress =

Taiwanese film award

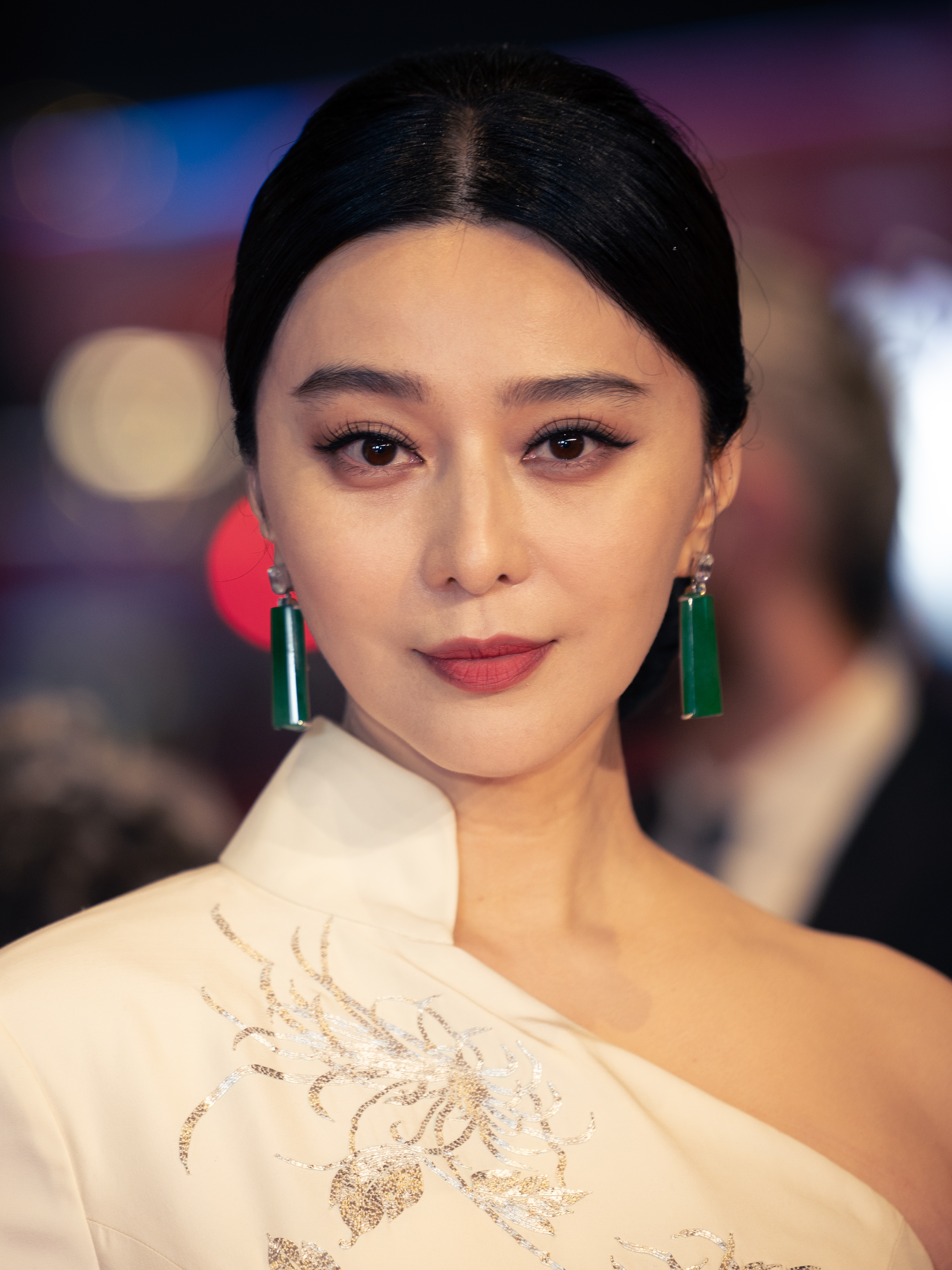
- The 2025 recipient: Fan Bingbing
- Awarded for: Best Performance by an Actress in a Leading Role
- Country: Taiwan
- Presented by: Taipei Golden Horse Film Festival Executive Committee
- First award: 1962
- Currently held by: Fan Bingbing for Mother Bhumi (2025)
- Website: goldenhorse.org.tw

The Golden Horse Award for Best Leading Actress (Chinese: 金馬獎最佳女主角) is presented annually at Taiwan's Golden Horse Film Awards.

Hong Kong actress Maggie Cheung holds the record for the most wins in this category, with four, for her performances in Full Moon in New York (1989), Center Stage (1991), Comrades: Almost a Love Story (1997), and In the Mood for Love (2001). Taiwanese actress Sylvia Chang holds the record for the most nominations, with eleven.

== Winners and nominees ==
indicates the winner

Maggie Cheung won four times for Full Moon in New York (1989), Center Stage (1991), Comrades: Almost a Love Story (1997), and In the Mood for Love (2001)

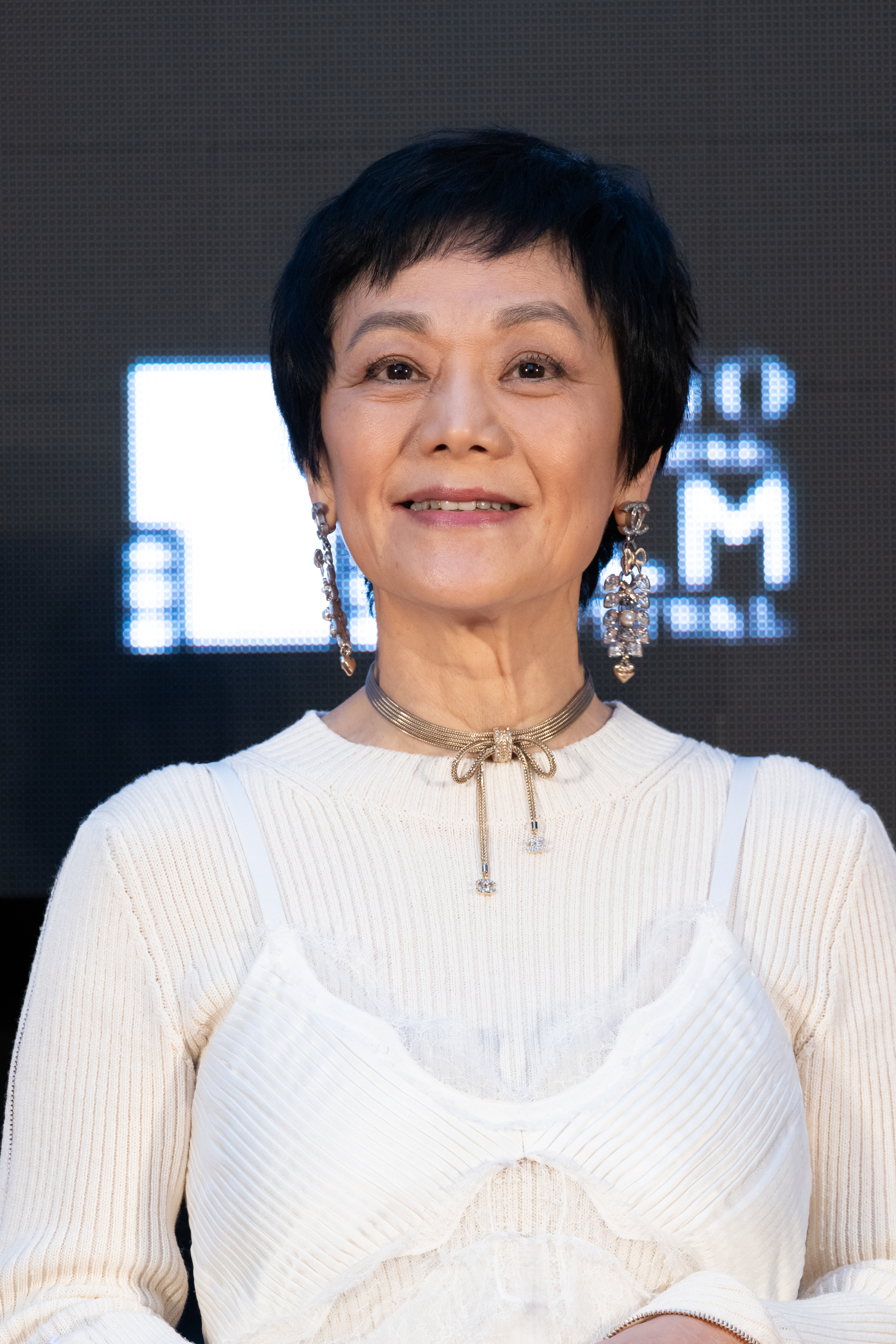
Sylvia Chang won thrice for My Grandfather (1981), Passion (1986), and A Light Never Goes Out (2022)

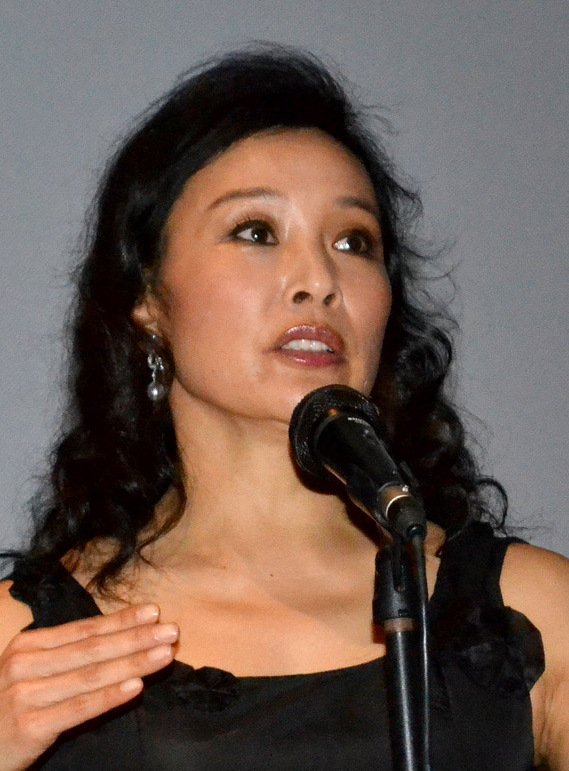
Joan Chen won twice for Red Rose White Rose (1994) and The Home Song Stories (2007)

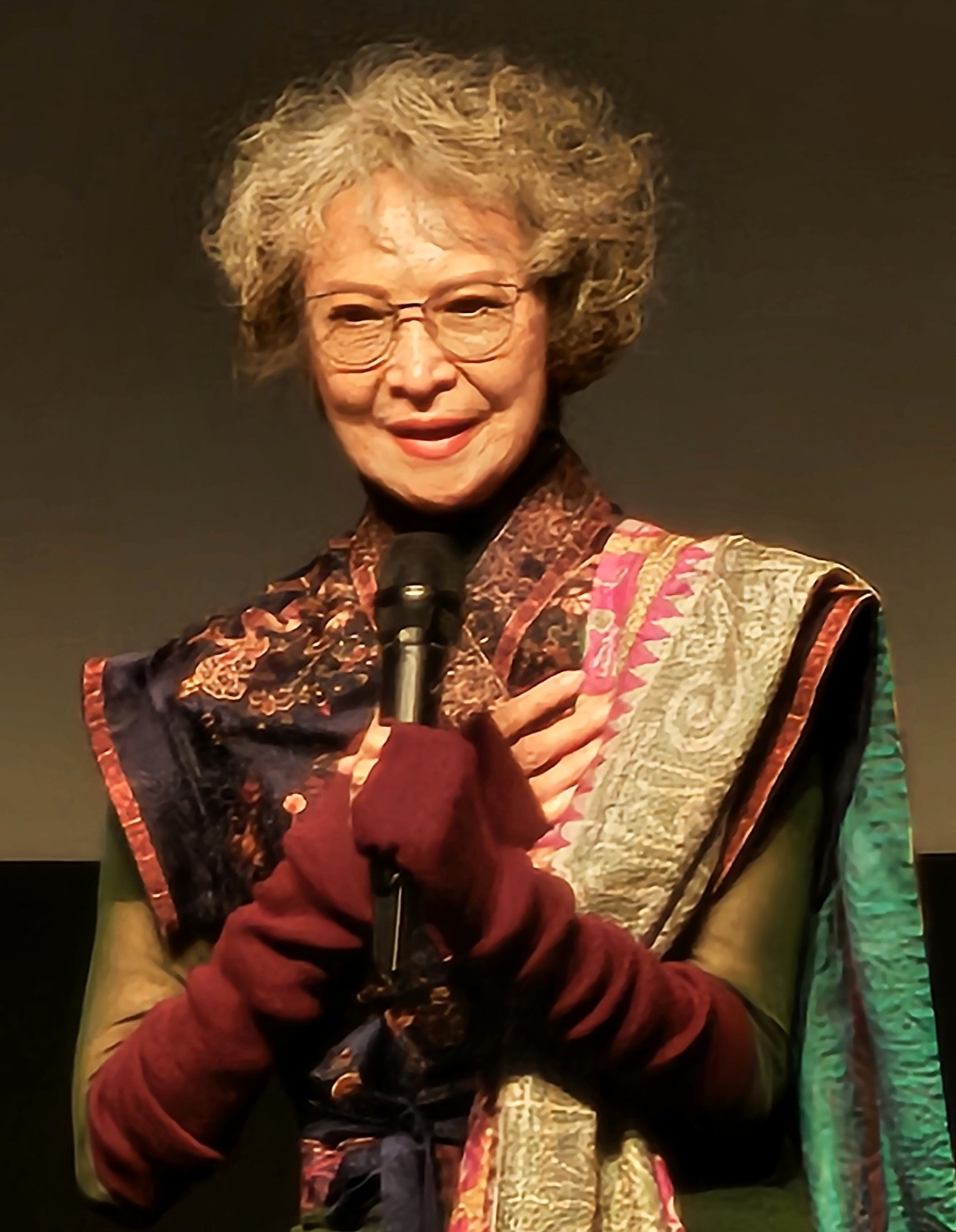
Josephine Siao won twice for Summer Snow (1995) and Hu-Du-Men (1996)

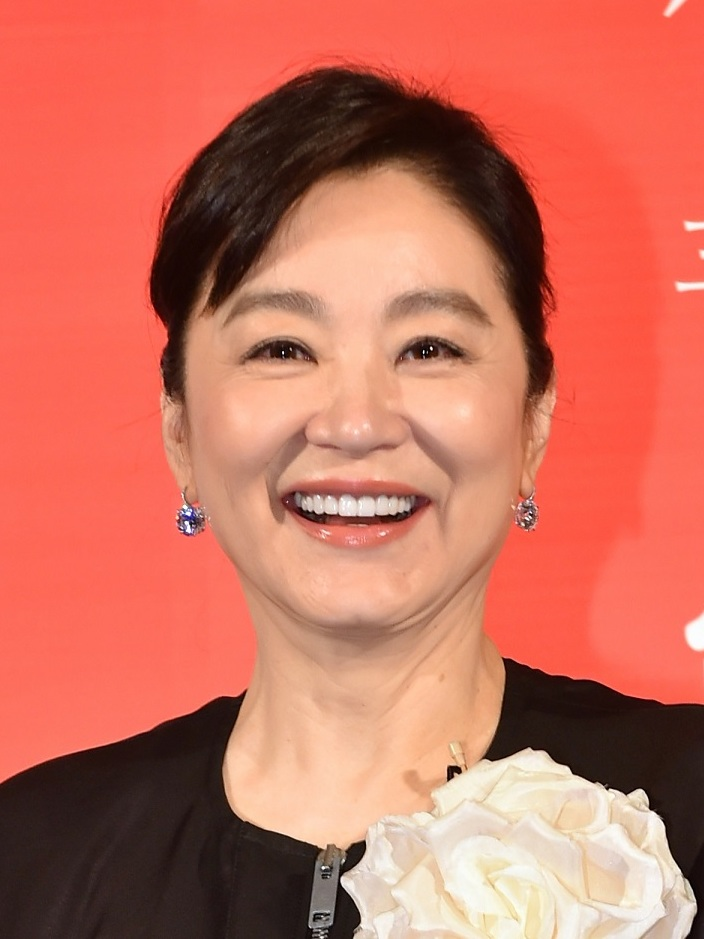
Brigitte Lin won for Red Dust (1990)

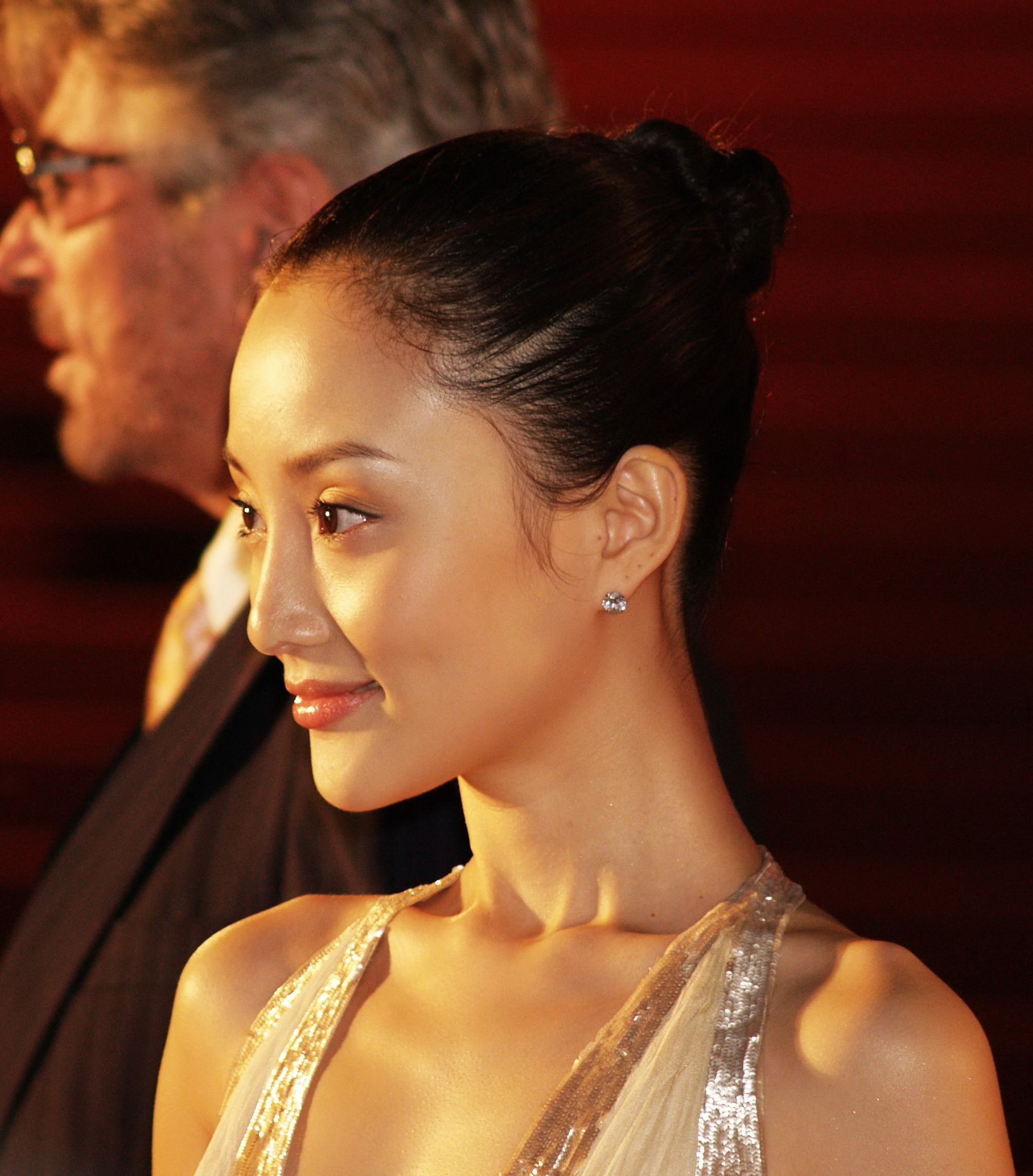
Li Xiaolu won for Xiu Xiu: The Sent Down Girl (1998)

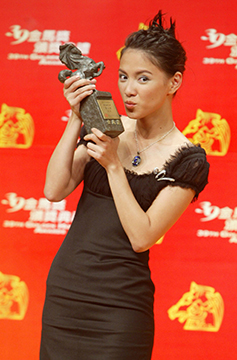
Angelica Lee won for The Eye (2002)

Sandra Ng won for Golden Chicken (2003)

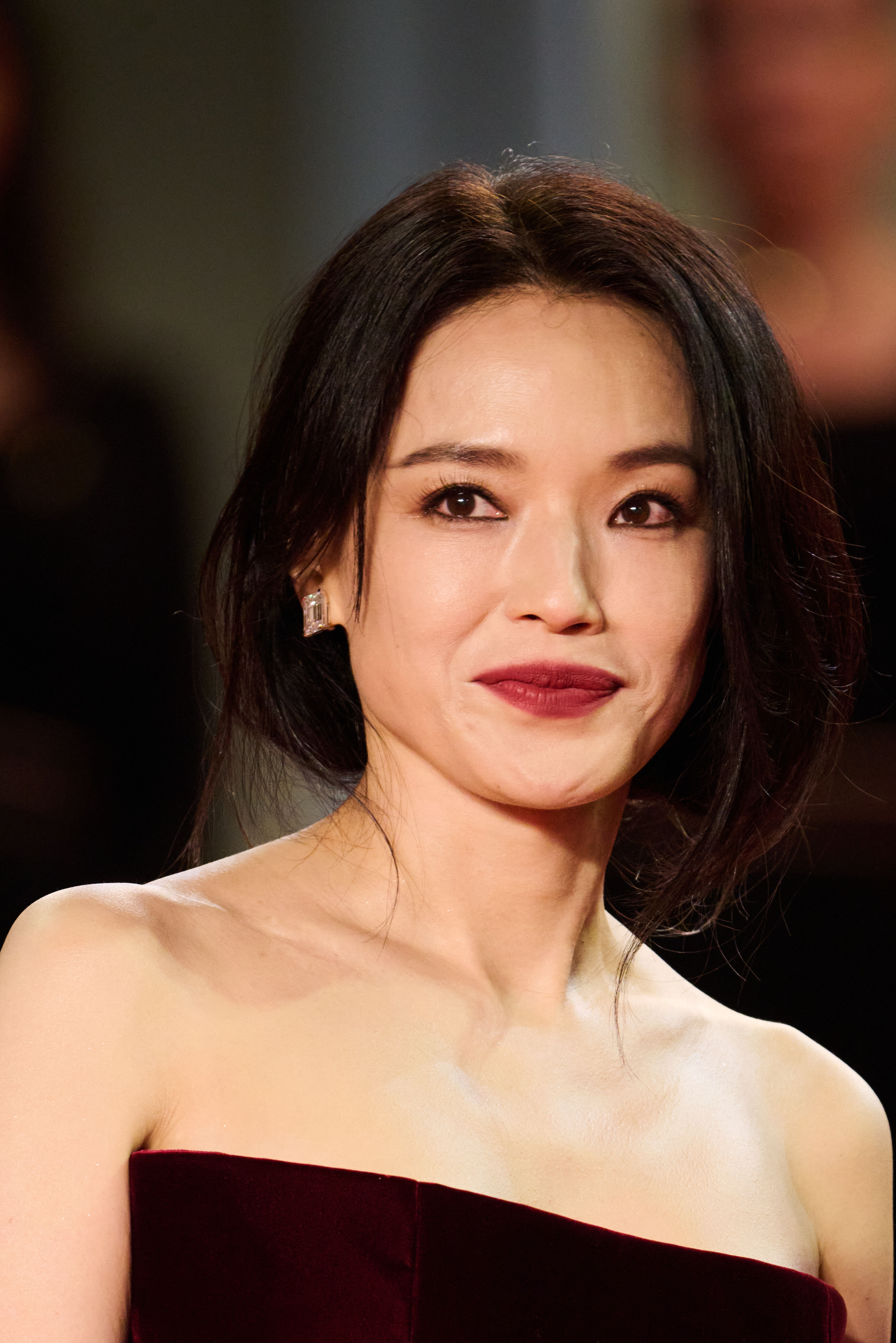
Shu Qi won for Three Times (2005)

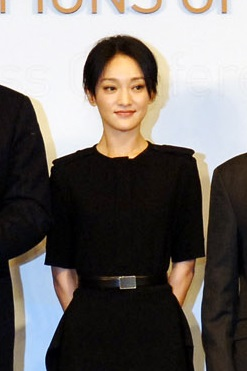
Zhou Xun won for Perhaps Love (2006)

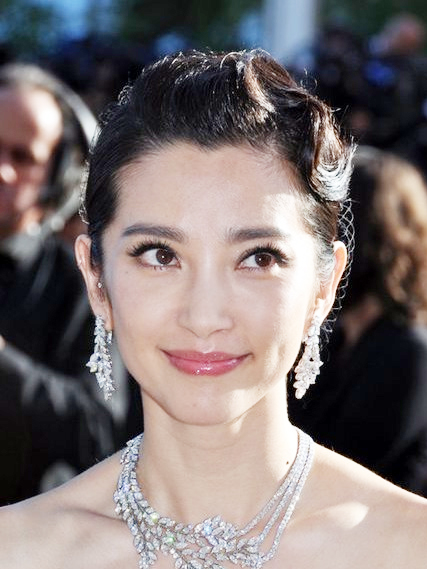
Li Bingbing won for The Message (2009)

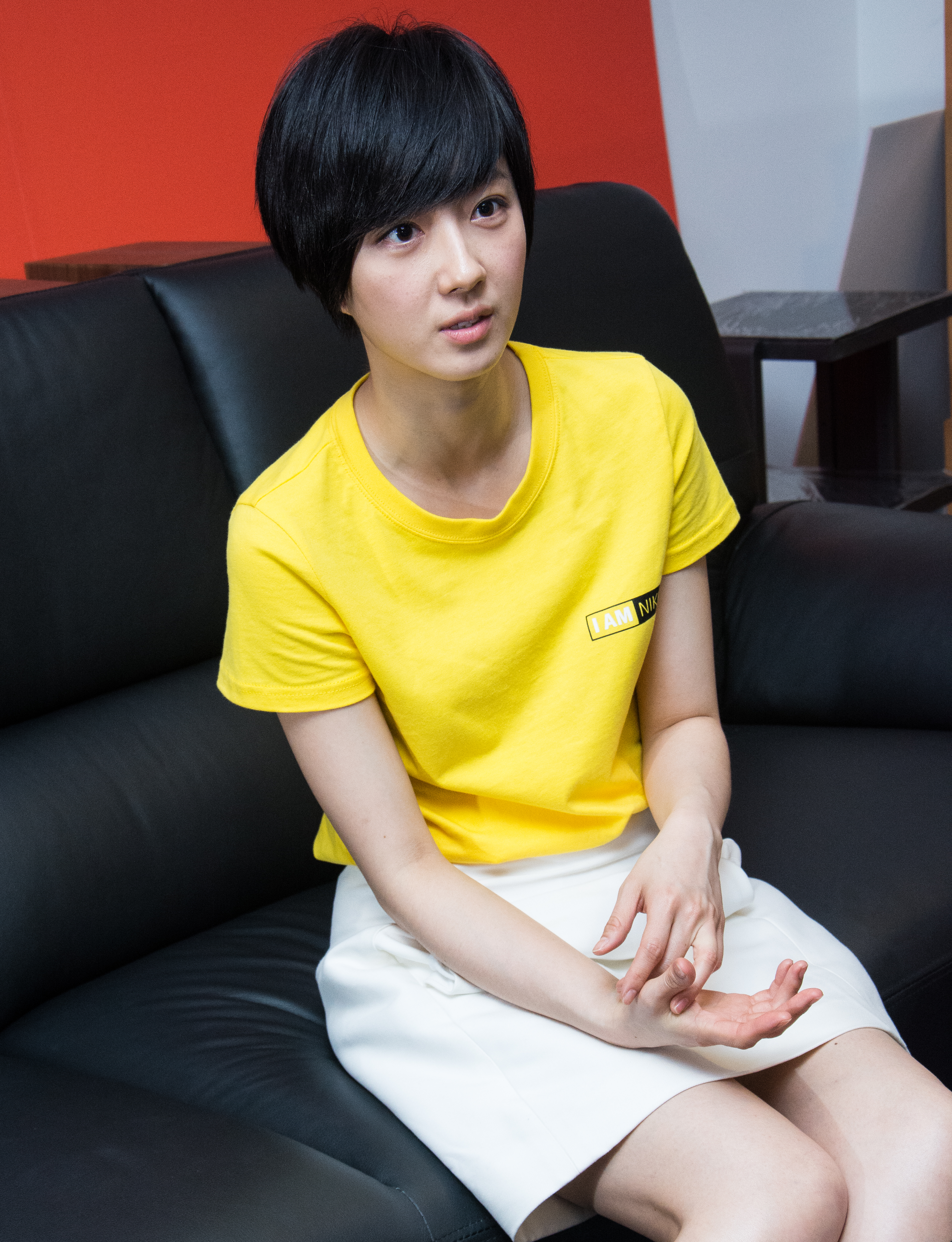
Gwei Lun-mei won for Girlfriend, Boyfriend (2012)

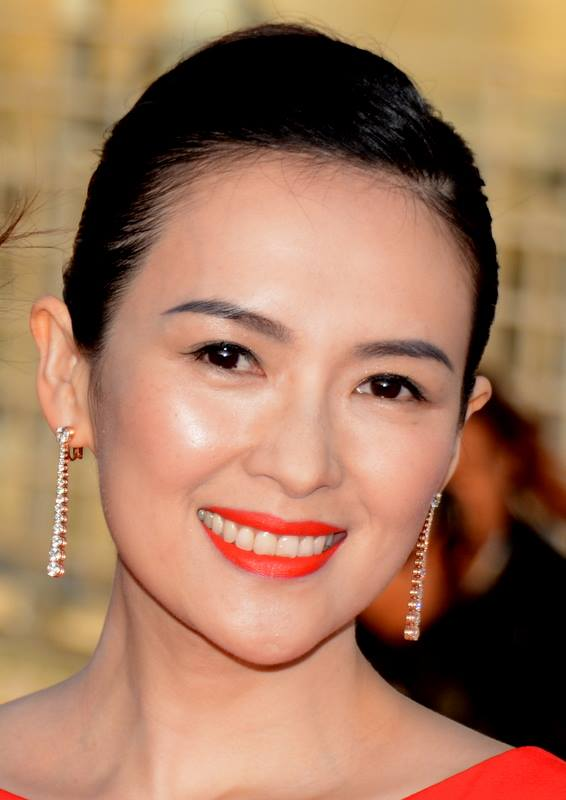
Zhang Ziyi won for The Grandmaster (2013)

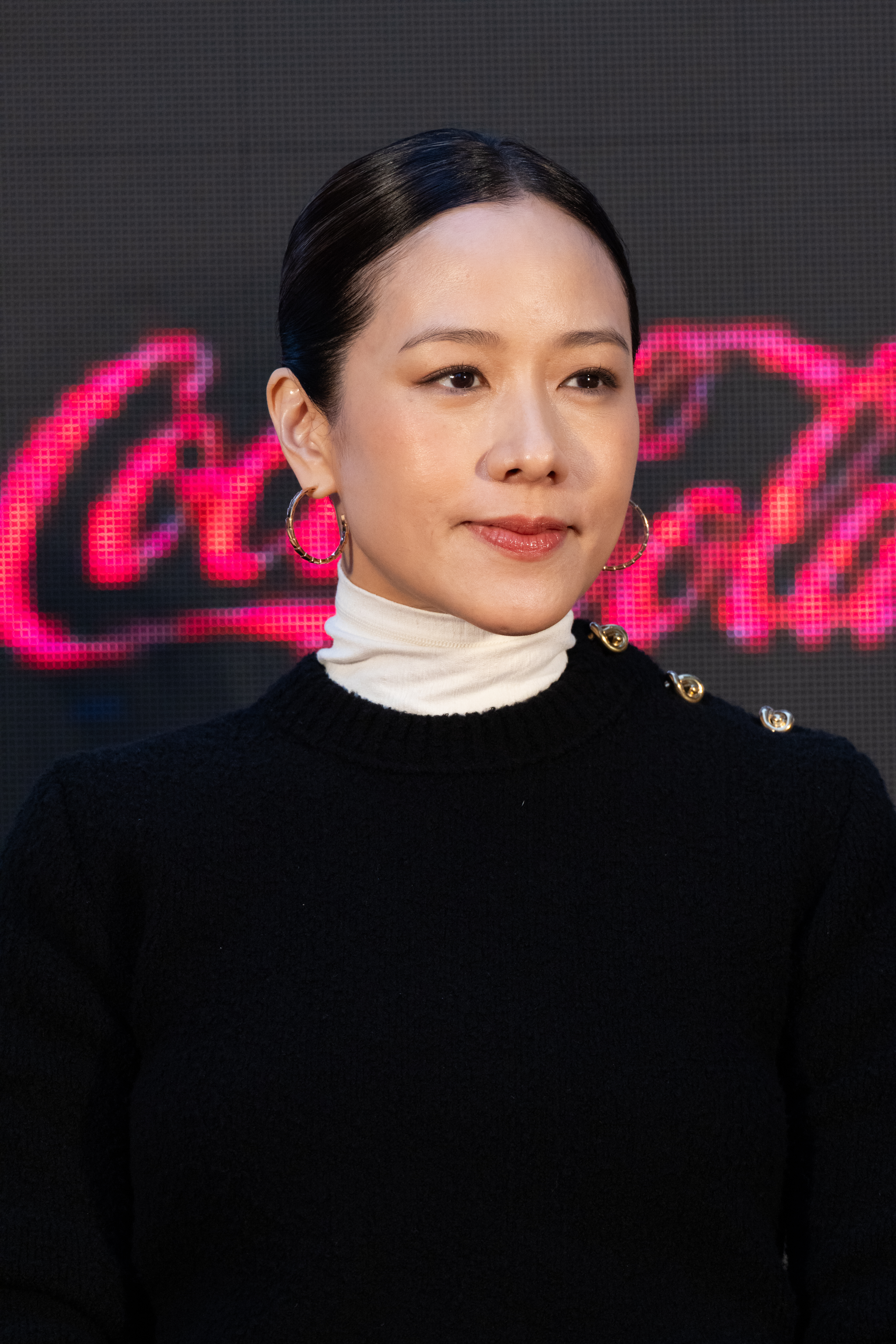
Karena Lam won for Zinnia Flower (2015)

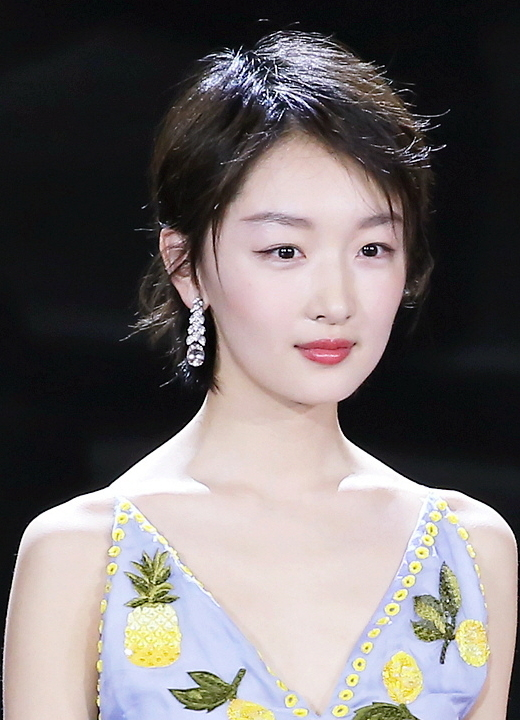
Zhou Dongyu won (ex-æquo) for Soul Mate (2016)

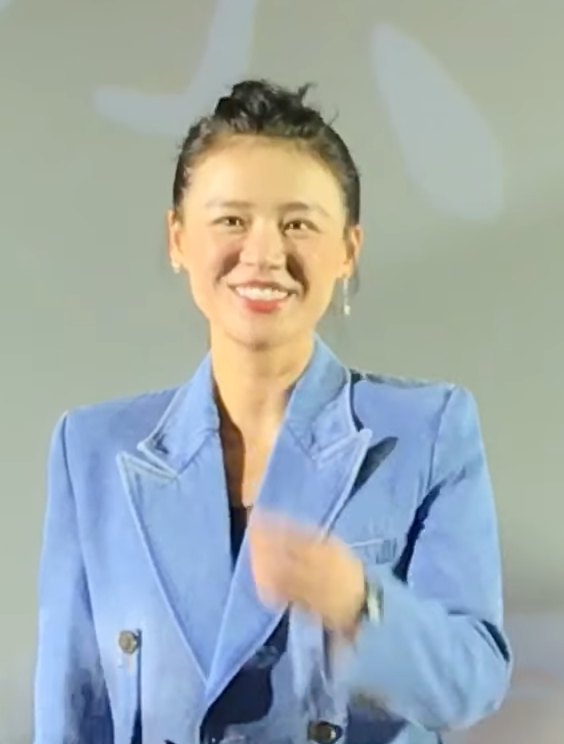
Ma Sichun won (ex-æquo) for Soul Mate (2016)

Kara Wai won for The Bold, the Corrupt, and the Beautiful (2017)

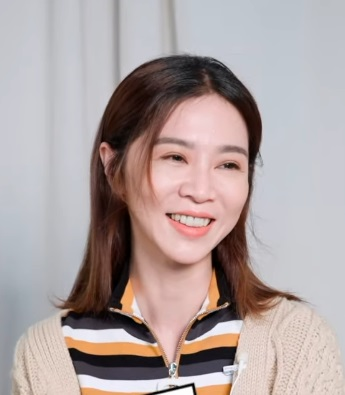
Hsieh Ying-xuan won for Dear Ex (2018)

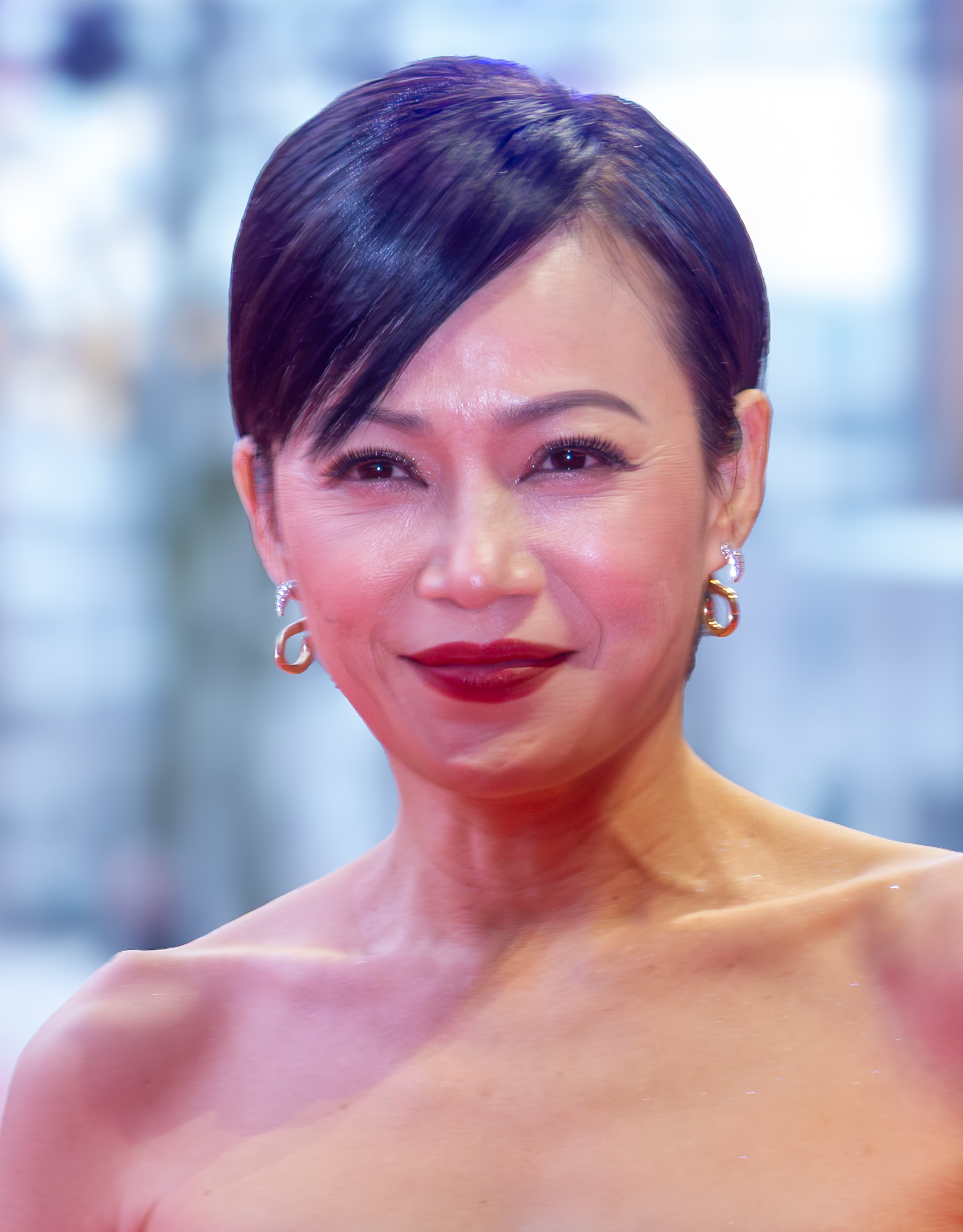
Yeo Yann Yann won for Wet Season (2019)

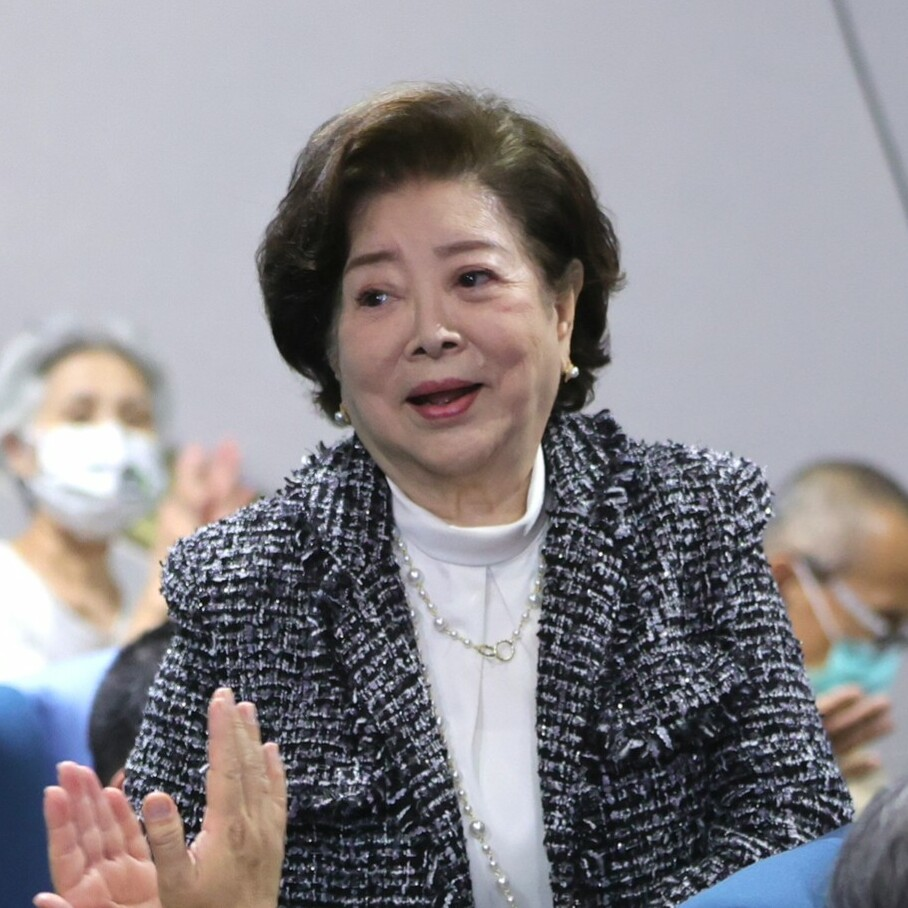
Chen Shu-fang won for Little Big Women (2020)

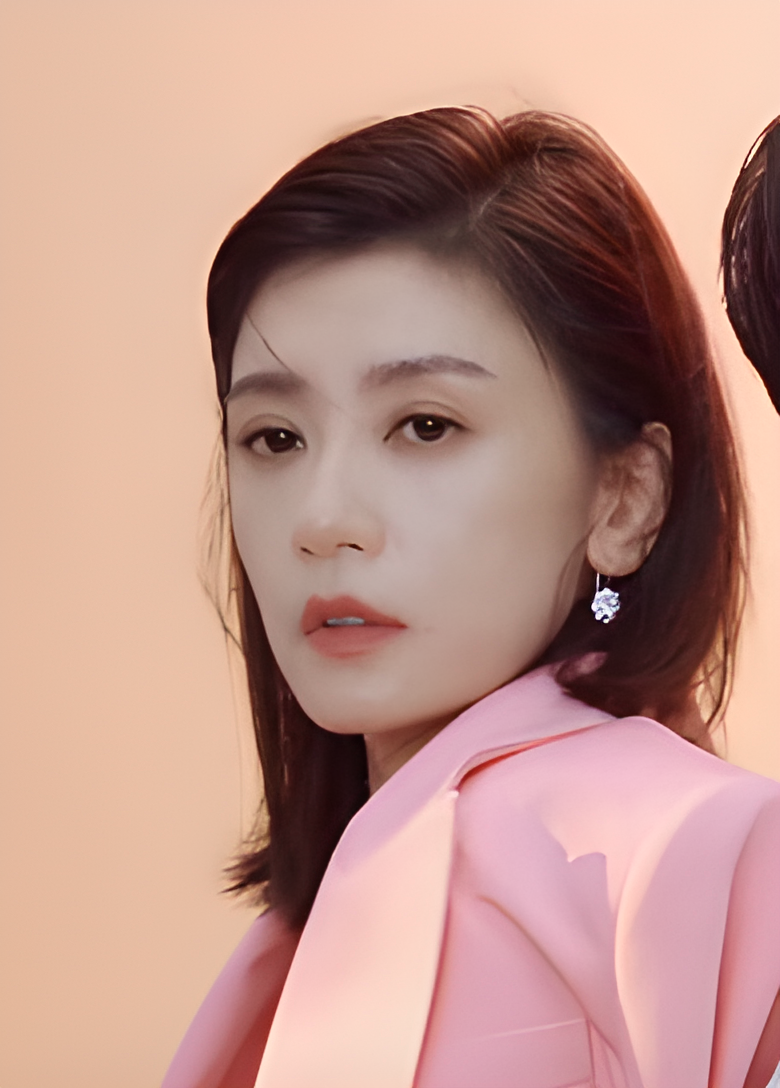
Alyssa Chia won for The Falls (2021)

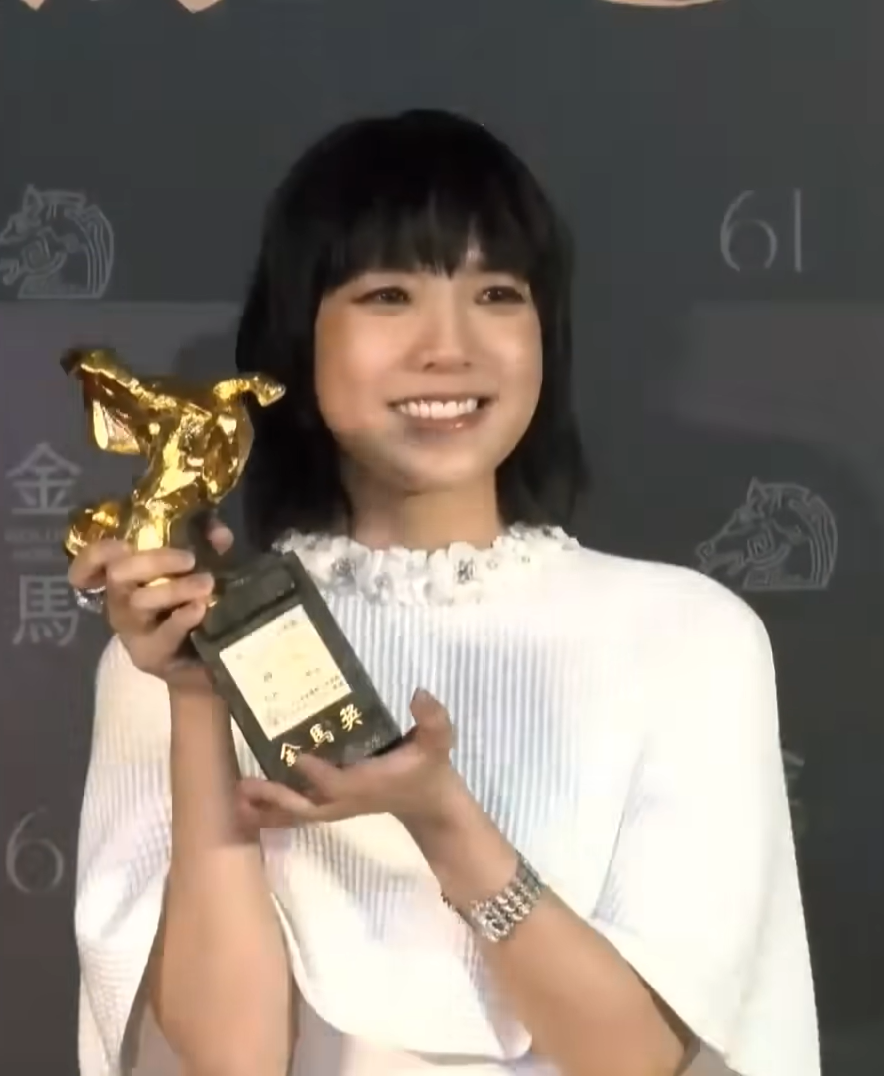
Chung Suet Ying won for The Way We Talk (2024)

Fan Bingbing won for Mother Bhumi (2025)

=== 1960s ===
Year	Recipient(s)	Film	Original title
1962 (1st)	You Min	Sun, Moon and Star	星星月亮太陽
1963 (2nd)	Betty Loh Ti	The Love Eterne	梁山伯與祝英台
1965 (3rd)	Li Li-hua	Between Tears and Laughter	故都春夢
1966 (4th)	Gua Ah-leh	The Rain of Sorrow	煙雨濛濛
1967 (5th)	Chiang Ching	Many Enchanting Nights	幾度夕陽紅
1968 (6th)	Ivy Ling Po	Too Late for Love	烽火萬里情
1969 (7th)	Li Li-hua	Storm over the Yangtze River	揚子江風雲

=== 1970s ===
Year	Recipient(s)	Film	Original title
1970 (8th)	Gua Ah-leh	Home, Sweet Home	家在台北
1971 (9th)	Lisa Lu	The Arch	董夫人
1972 (10th)	Judy Ongg	True and False Daughter	真假千金
1973 (11th)	Polly Shang-Kuan Ling-feng	Back Alley Princess	馬路小英雄
1975 (12th)	Lisa Lu	The Empress Dowager	傾國傾城
1976 (13th)	Hsu Feng	Assassin	刺客
1977 (14th)	Chelsia Chan	Chelsia My Love	秋霞
1978 (15th)	Tien Niu	Didi's Diary	蒂蒂日記
1978 (15th)	Joan Lin	He Never Gives Up	汪洋中的一條船
1978 (15th)	Zhen Zhen	The Glory of the Sunset	煙水寒
1979 (16th)	Joan Lin	The Story of a Small Town	小城故事
1979 (16th)	Sibelle Hu	Your Smiling Face	歡顏
1979 (16th)	Hsu Feng	Legend of the Mountain	山中傳奇

=== 1980s ===
Year	Recipient(s)	Film	Original title
1980 (17th)	Hsu Feng	The Pioneers	源
1980 (17th)	Brigitte Lin	Magnificent 72	碧血黃花
1980 (17th)	Sylvia Chang	White Jasmine	茉莉花
1981 (18th)	Sylvia Chang	My Grandfather	我的爺爺
1981 (18th)	Sibelle Hu	The Coldest Winter in Peking	皇天后土
1981 (18th)	Ying Tsai-ling	The Unsinkable Miss Calabash	小葫蘆
1982 (19th)	Wang Ping	Tiger Killer	武松
1982 (19th)	Brigitte Lin	Hero vs Hero	慧眼識英雄
1982 (19th)	Tien Niu	Girls' School	女子學校
1983 (20th)	Lu Hsiao-fen	A Flower in the Raining Night	看海的日子
1983 (20th)	Chang Chuen-fang	Growing Up	小畢的故事
1983 (20th)	Cherie Chung	Hong Kong, Hong Kong	男與女
1984 (21st)	Loretta Yang	Teenage Fugitive	小逃犯
1984 (21st)	Chang Chuen-Fang	Old Mao's Second Spring	老莫的第二個春天
1984 (21st)	Yao Wei	The Last Night of Madam Chin	金大班的最後一夜
1985 (22nd)	Loretta Yang	Kuei-Mei, a Woman	我這樣過了一生
1985 (22nd)	Chang Ying-chen	Run Away	策馬入林
1985 (22nd)	Cora Miao	Women	女人心
1986 (23rd)	Sylvia Chang	Passion	最愛
1986 (23rd)	Loretta Yang	This Love of Mine	我的愛
1986 (23rd)	Cora Miao	Terrorizers	恐怖分子
1987 (24th)	Anita Mui	Rouge	胭脂扣
1987 (24th)	Cherie Chung	An Autumn's Tale	秋天的童話
1987 (24th)	Hsiao Hung-Mei	Edelweiss	白色酢漿草
1988 (25th)	Carol Cheng	Moon, Star and Sun	月亮星星太陽
1988 (25th)	Chiang Hsia	People Between Two China	海峽兩岸
1988 (25th)	Cora Miao	Love in a Fallen City	傾城之戀
1989 (26th)	Maggie Cheung	Full Moon in New York	三個女人的故事
1989 (26th)	Sylvia Chang	Full Moon in New York	三個女人的故事
1989 (26th)	Cherie Chung	Wild Search	伴我闖天涯

=== 1990s ===
Year	Recipient(s)	Film	Original title
1990 (27th)	Brigitte Lin	Red Dust	紅塵滾滾
1990 (27th)	Cecilia Yip	This Thing Called Love	婚姻勿語
1990 (27th)	Carol Cheng	Her Fatal Ways	表姐，妳好嘢！
1991 (28th)	Maggie Cheung	Center Stage	阮玲玉
1991 (28th)	Anita Mui	Au Revoir, Mon Amour	何日君再來
1991 (28th)	Lisa Yang	A Brighter Summer Day	牯嶺街少年殺人事件
1991 (28th)	Carina Lau	Days of Being Wild	阿飛正傳
1992 (29th)	Lindzay Chan	To Liv(e)	浮世戀曲
1992 (29th)	Yang Kuei-mei	Hill of No Return	無言的山丘
1992 (29th)	Wang Yu-wen	Rebels of the Neon God	青少年哪吒
1992 (29th)	Maggie Cheung	New Dragon Gate Inn	新龍門客棧
1993 (30th)	Carrie Ng	Remains of a Woman	赤祼的誘惑
1993 (30th)	Lu Hsiao-fen	18	十八
1993 (30th)	Anita Yuen	C'est la vie, mon chéri	新不了情
1993 (30th)	Veronica Yip	A Touch of Class	天台的月光
1994 (31st)	Joan Chen	Red Rose White Rose	紅玫瑰，白玫瑰
1994 (31st)	Ni Shu-Chun	A Confucian Confusion	獨立時代
1994 (31st)	Veronica Yip	Red Rose White Rose	紅玫瑰，白玫瑰
1994 (31st)	Faye Wong	Chungking Express	重慶森林
1995 (32nd)	Josephine Siao	Summer Snow	女人四十
1995 (32nd)	Gua Ah-leh	Maiden Rosé	一罈女兒紅
1995 (32nd)	Rene Liu	Siao Yu	少女小漁
1995 (32nd)	Annie Yi	Good Men, Good Women	好男好女
1996 (33rd)	Josephine Siao	Hu-Du-Men	虎度門
1996 (33rd)	Tao Shu	Red Persimmon	紅柿子
1996 (33rd)	Ning Jing	In the Heat of the Sun	阳光灿烂的日子
1996 (33rd)	Sandra Ng	4 Faces of Eve	四面夏娃
1997 (34th)	Maggie Cheung	Comrades: Almost a Love Story	甜蜜蜜
1997 (34th)	Shu Qi	Love Is Not a Game, But a Joke	飛一般的愛情小說
1997 (34th)	Karen Mok	The God of Cookery	食神
1997 (34th)	Annie Yi	Wolves Cry Under the Moon	國道封閉
1998 (35th)	Li Xiaolu	Xiu Xiu: The Sent Down Girl	天浴
1998 (35th)	Rene Liu	The Personals	徵婚啟事
1998 (35th)	Yang Kuei-mei	The Hole	洞
1998 (35th)	Sandra Ng	Portland Street Blues	古惑仔情義篇之洪興十三妹
1999 (36th)	Loletta Lee	Ordinary Heroes	千言萬語
1999 (36th)	Gigi Leung	Tempting Heart	心動
1999 (36th)	Athena Chu	The Boss Up There	生命楂fit人
1999 (36th)	Lee Kang-i	Darkness and Light	黑暗之光

=== 2000s ===
Year	Recipient(s)	Film	Original title
2000 (37th)	Maggie Cheung	In the Mood for Love	花樣年華
2000 (37th)	Zhang Ziyi	Crouching Tiger, Hidden Dragon	臥虎藏龍
2000 (37th)	Michelle Yeoh	Crouching Tiger, Hidden Dragon	臥虎藏龍
2000 (37th)	Sammi Cheng	Needing You...	孤男寡女
2001 (38th)	Qin Hailu	Durian Durian	榴槤飄飄
2001 (38th)	Anita Mui	Midnight Fly	慌心假期
2001 (38th)	Sylvia Chang	Forever and Ever	地久天長
2001 (38th)	Shu Qi	Millennium Mambo	千禧曼波
2002 (39th)	Angelica Lee	The Eye	見鬼
2002 (39th)	Sammi Cheng	My Left Eye Sees Ghosts	我左眼見到鬼
2002 (39th)	Zhou Xun	Hollywood Hong Kong	香港有個荷里活
2002 (39th)	Anita Mui	July Rhapsody	男人四十
2003 (40th)	Sandra Ng	Golden Chicken	金雞
2003 (40th)	Ariel Lin	Love Me, If You Can	飛躍情海
2003 (40th)	Lu Yi-ching	The Missing	不見
2003 (40th)	Chen Shiang-chyi	Goodbye, Dragon Inn	不散
2004 (41st)	Yang Kuei-mei	The Moon Also Rises	月光下，我記得
2004 (41st)	Sylvia Chang	Rice Rhapsody	海南雞飯
2004 (41st)	Zhang Ziyi	2046	2046
2004 (41st)	Wang Chuan	Autumn of Blue	秋天的藍調
2005 (42nd)	Shu Qi	Three Times	最好的時光
2005 (42nd)	Michelle Krusiec	Saving Face	面子
2005 (42nd)	Miriam Yeung	Drink-Drank-Drunk	千杯不醉
2005 (42nd)	Chen Shiang-chyi	The Wayward Cloud	天邊一朵雲
2006 (43rd)	Zhou Xun	Perhaps Love	如果·愛
2006 (43rd)	Siqin Gaowa	The Postmodern Life of My Aunt	姨媽的後現代生活
2006 (43rd)	Angelica Lee	Re-cycle	鬼域
2006 (43rd)	Carina Lau	Curiosity Kills the Cat	好奇害死貓
2007 (44th)	Joan Chen	The Home Song Stories	意
2007 (44th)	Li Bingbing	The Knot	雲水謠
2007 (44th)	Tang Wei	Lust, Caution	色，戒
2007 (44th)	Rene Liu	Kidnap	綁架
2008 (45th)	Prudence Liew	True Women for Sale	我不賣身．我賣子宮
2008 (45th)	Monica Mok	Ocean Flame	一半海水，一半火燄
2008 (45th)	Karena Lam	Claustrophobia	親密
2008 (45th)	Sandrine Pinna	Miao Miao	渺渺
2009 (46th)	Li Bingbing	The Message	風聲
2009 (46th)	Zhou Xun	The Message	風聲
2009 (46th)	Yuan Quan	Like A Dream	如夢
2009 (46th)	Sandrine Pinna	Yang Yang	陽陽

=== 2010s ===
Year	Recipient(s)	Film	Original title
2010 (47th)	Lü Liping	City Monkey	玩酷青春
2010 (47th)	Tang Wei	Crossing Hennessy	月滿軒尼詩
2010 (47th)	Xu Fan	Aftershock	唐山大地震
2010 (47th)	Sylvia Chang	Buddha Mountain	觀音山
2011 (48th)	Deanie Ip	A Simple Life	桃姐
2011 (48th)	Michelle Chen	You Are the Apple of My Eye	那些年，我們一起追的女孩
2011 (48th)	Shu Qi	A Beautiful Life	不再讓你孤單
2011 (48th)	Qin Hailu	The Piano in a Factory	鋼的琴
2012 (49th)	Gwei Lun-mei	Girlfriend, Boyfriend	女朋友。男朋友
2012 (49th)	Bai Baihe	Love Is Not Blind	失恋33天
2012 (49th)	Hao Lei	Mystery	浮城謎事
2012 (49th)	Sandrine Pinna	Touch of the Light	逆光飛翔
2012 (49th)	Denise Ho	Life Without Principle	奪命金
2013 (50th)	Zhang Ziyi	The Grandmaster	一代宗師
2013 (50th)	Cherry Ngan	The Way We Dance	狂舞派
2013 (50th)	Gwei Lun-mei	Christmas Rose	聖誕玫瑰
2013 (50th)	Shu Qi	Journey to the West: Conquering the Demons	西遊·降魔篇
2013 (50th)	Sammi Cheng	Blind Detective	盲探
2014 (51st)	Chen Shiang-chyi	Exit	迴光奏鳴曲
2014 (51st)	Gwei Lun-mei	Black Coal, Thin Ice	白日焰火
2014 (51st)	Gong Li	Coming Home	归来
2014 (51st)	Tang Wei	The Golden Era	黃金時代
2014 (51st)	Zhao Wei	Dearest	親愛的
2015 (52nd)	Karena Lam	Zinnia Flower	百日告別
2015 (52nd)	Sylvia Chang	Office	華麗上班族
2015 (52nd)	Vivian Sung	Our Times	我的少女時代
2015 (52nd)	Shu Qi	The Assassin	刺客聶隱娘
2015 (52nd)	Zhao Tao	Mountains May Depart	山河故人
2016 (53rd)	Zhou Dongyu	Soul Mate	七月與安生
2016 (53rd)	Ma Sichun	Soul Mate	七月與安生
2016 (53rd)	Hsu Wei-ning	The Tag-Along	紅衣小女孩
2016 (53rd)	Fan Bingbing	I Am Not Madame Bovary	我不是潘金莲
2016 (53rd)	Wu Ke-xi	The Road to Mandalay	再見瓦城
2017 (54th)	Kara Wai	The Bold, the Corrupt, and the Beautiful	血觀音
2017 (54th)	Shu Qi	The Village of No Return	健忘村
2017 (54th)	Sylvia Chang	Love Education	相愛相親
2017 (54th)	Vicky Chen	Angels Wear White	嘉年华
2017 (54th)	Ivy Yin	The Island That All Flow By	川流之島
2018 (55th)	Hsieh Ying-xuan	Dear Ex	誰先愛上他的
2018 (55th)	Zhou Xun	Last Letter	你好，之华
2018 (55th)	Sun Li	Shadow	影
2018 (55th)	Zhao Tao	Ash Is Purest White	江湖儿女
2018 (55th)	Chloe Maayan	Three Husbands	三夫
2019 (56th)	Yeo Yann Yann	Wet Season	熱帶雨
2019 (56th)	Angelica Lee	The Garden of Evening Mists	夕霧花園
2019 (56th)	Gingle Wang	Detention	返校
2019 (56th)	Lü Hsueh-feng	The Beloved Stranger	那個我最親愛的陌生人
2019 (56th)	Ko Shu-chin	A Sun	陽光普照

=== 2020s ===
Year	Recipient(s)	Film	Original title	Ref.
2020 (57th)	Chen Shu-fang	Little Big Women	孤味	
2020 (57th)	Gwei Lun-mei	A Leg	腿	
2020 (57th)	Bai Ling	The Abortionist	墮胎師	
2020 (57th)	Hsieh Hsin-ying	I WeirDo	怪胎	
2020 (57th)	Patty Lee	My Missing Valentine	消失的情人節	
2021 (58th)	Alyssa Chia	The Falls	瀑布	
2021 (58th)	Gingle Wang	The Falls	瀑布	
2021 (58th)	Chen Shiang-chyi	Increasing Echo	修行	
2021 (58th)	Karena Lam	American Girl	美國女孩	
2021 (58th)	Caitlin Fang	American Girl	美國女孩	
2022 (59th)	Sylvia Chang	A Light Never Goes Out	燈火闌珊	
2022 (59th)	Cya Liu	Limbo	智齒	
2022 (59th)	Tsai Hsuan-yen	Incantation	咒	
2022 (59th)	Angela Yuen	The Narrow Road	窄路微塵	
2022 (59th)	Hong Huifang	Ajoomma	花路阿朱妈	
2023 (60th)	Audrey Lin	Trouble Girl	小曉	
2023 (60th)	Hu Ling	Carp Leaping Over Dragon's Gate	菠蘿，鳳梨	
2023 (60th)	Chung Suet Ying	The Lyricist Wannabe	填詞撚	
2023 (60th)	Lu Hsiao-fen	Day Off	本日公休	
2023 (60th)	Jennifer Yu	In Broad Daylight	白日之下	
2024 (61st)	Chung Suet Ying	The Way We Talk	看我今天怎麼說	
2024 (61st)	Patra Au	All Shall Be Well	從今以後	
2024 (61st)	Kimi Hsia	Yen and Ai-Lee	小雁與吳愛麗	
2024 (61st)	Sylvia Chang	Daughter's Daughter	女兒的女兒	
2024 (61st)	Sandra Ng	Love Lies	我談的那場戀愛	
2025 (62nd)	Fan Bingbing	Mother Bhumi	地母	
2025 (62nd)	Rene Liu	Unexpected Courage	我們意外的勇氣	
2025 (62nd)	Ariel Lin	Deep Quiet Room	深度安靜	
2025 (62nd)	Alexia Kao	Family Matters	我家的事	
2025 (62nd)	Caitlin Fang	A Foggy Tale	大濛	

== Multiple wins and nominations ==
The following individuals won two or more Golden Horse Awards for Best Leading Actress:

Wins	Actress
4	Maggie Cheung
3	Sylvia Chang
2	Gua Ah-leh
2	Loretta Yang
2	Hsu Feng
2	Lisa Lu
2	Li Li-hua
2	Josephine Siao
2	Joan Chen

The following individuals received four or more Best Leading Actress nominations:

Nominations	Actress
11	Sylvia Chang
7	Shu Qi
5	Maggie Cheung
4	Anita Mui
4	Zhou Xun
4	Gwei Lun-mei
4	Chen Shiang-chyi
4	Sandra Ng
4	Rene Liu

== Age superlatives ==
Record	Actress	Age
Oldest winner / nominee	Chen Shu-fang	81 (2020)
Youngest winner / nominee	Audrey Lin	12 (2023)

== See also ==
- Academy Award for Best Actress
- Asian Film Award for Best Actress
- BAFTA Award for Best Actress in a Leading Role
- Blue Dragon Film Award for Best Actress
- Cannes Film Festival Award for Best Actress
- César Award for Best Actress
- David di Donatello for Best Actress
- Hong Kong Film Award for Best Actress
- Japan Academy Film Prize for Outstanding Performance by an Actress in a Leading Role
- Volpi Cup for Best Actress
