= The Bold, the Corrupt, and the Beautiful =

- Theatrical release poster
- Chinese: 血觀音
- Literal meaning: Guanyin in blood
- Hanyu Pinyin: Xuè Guānyīn
- Directed by: Yang Ya-che
- Written by: Yang Ya-che
- Produced by: Liu Weijian
- Starring: Kara Wai; Wu Ke-xi; Vicky Chen
- Cinematography: Chen Ko-chin
- Edited by: Chen Chun-hong
- Music by: Blaire Ko
- Production companies: Atom Films; CMC Entertainment; CS Productions; Kaohsiung Film Fund
- Distributed by: A Really Happy Film; Vie Vision Pictures
- Release dates: October 15, 2017 (BIFF); November 24, 2017 (Taiwan)
- Running time: 112 minutes
- Country: Taiwan
- Languages: Mandarin; Hokkien; Cantonese; Japanese
- Box office: NT$77.9 million

The Bold, the Corrupt, and the Beautiful (Chinese: 血觀音; pinyin: Xuè guānyīn; Bloody Guanyin) is a 2017 Taiwanese crime drama film written and directed by Yang Ya-che, set in Taiwan in the 1980s. The film stars Kara Wai, Wu Ke-xi and Vicky Chen. It premiered on October 15, 2017, at the 22nd Busan International Film Festival.

== Plot ==
Madame Tang, the wife of a general, is an antique dealer who lives in a mansion with her two daughters. Dealing with high ranking government officials and the rich, their lives are disrupted when the family of their close friend is murdered. Soon, the murder escalates into a game of survival between those who are involved, in which the person with the last laugh is the winner.

== Cast ==
- Kara Wai as Madame Tang
- Wu Ke-xi as Tang Ning
- Vicky Chen as Tang Chen
- Sally Chen as Director
- Ko Chia-yen as Tang Chen (adult)
- Moon Wang as Wife of county magistrate
- Wen Chen-ling as Lin Pien-pien
- Carolyn Chen as Assistant of city councilor
- Mariko Okubo as Legislator Lin's wife
- Jun Fu as Police officer Liao
- Ting Chiang as Secretary-general
- Yin Chao-te as Legislator Lin
- Showlen Maya as Singer
- Ying Wei-min as Gu Xianzong
- Shih Ming-shuai as Duan Yi
- Kenny Yan as Jiayuan
- Lee Chuan as Tang Chen's assistant
- Lin Chih-ju
- Wu Shu-wei
- Yang Hsiu-ching

== Awards and nominations ==
Award	Category	Recipients	Result	Ref.
54th Golden Horse Awards	Best Feature Film	The Bold, the Corrupt, and the Beautiful	Won	
54th Golden Horse Awards	Best Director	Yang Ya-che	Nominated	
54th Golden Horse Awards	Best Leading Actress	Kara Wai	Won	
54th Golden Horse Awards	Best Supporting Actress	Vicky Chen	Won	
54th Golden Horse Awards	Best Original Screenplay	Yang Ya-che	Nominated	
54th Golden Horse Awards	Best Art Direction	Penny Tsai	Nominated	
54th Golden Horse Awards	Best Makeup & Costume Design	Wang Chia-hui	Nominated	
54th Golden Horse Awards	Audience Choice Award	The Bold, the Corrupt, and the Beautiful	Won	
37th Hong Kong Film Awards	Best Film from Mainland and Taiwan	The Bold, the Corrupt, and the Beautiful	Nominated	
20th Taipei Film Awards	Best Supporting Actress	Vicky Chen	Won	
