= Tokyo Girl =

Tokyo Girl may refer to:

- Tokyo Girl (2008 TV series), a 2008–2009 Japanese drama television series that aired on BS-TBS
- Tokyo Girl (2016 TV series), a 2016–2017 Japanese drama television series
- "Tokyo Girl", a song by Swedish group Ace of Base from their 1998 albums Flowers and Cruel Summer
- "Tokyo Girl", a song by Japanese girl group Perfume from their 2018 album Future Pop
