= Joseph Chang =

Taiwanese actor (born 1983)

- 張孝全
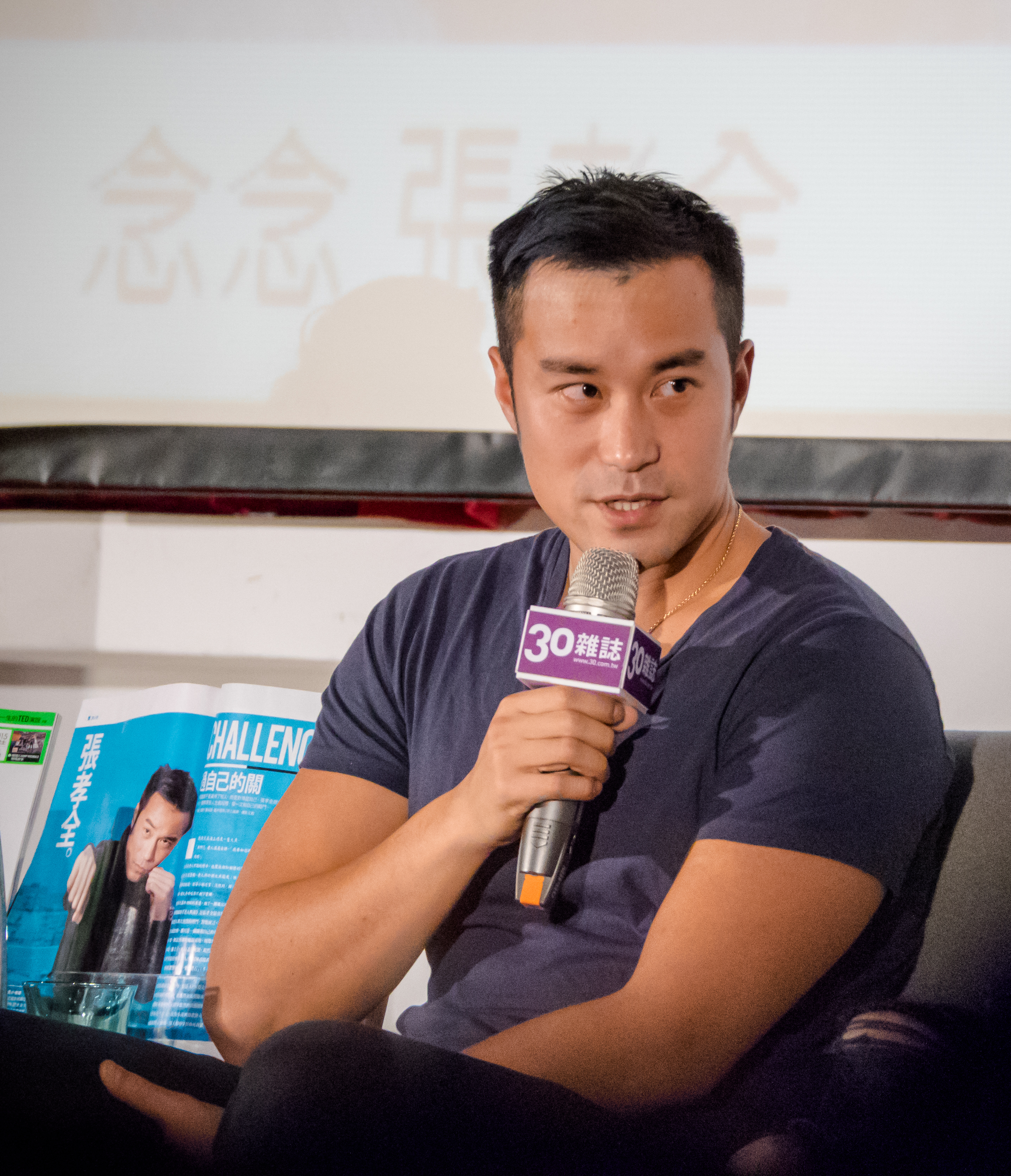
- Chang attending the promotional forum for the film Nian Nian
- Born: 28 December 1983 (age 42); Taiwan
- Other name: Zhang Xiaoquan
- Occupation: Actor
- Years active: 2001–present
- Spouse: Unknown (m. 2018)
- Children: 1

Chinese name
- Traditional Chinese: 張孝全
- Simplified Chinese: 张孝全
- Hanyu Pinyin: Zhāng Xiàoquán
- Jyutping: Zoeng1 Haau3 Cyun4
- Hokkien POJ: Tiuⁿ Hàu-choân

Joseph Chang Hsiao-chuan (Chinese: 張孝全; pinyin: Zhāng Xiàoquán; Pe̍h-ōe-jī: Tiuⁿ Hàu-choân, born 28 December 1983) is a Taiwanese actor. He is best known for his role in the critically acclaimed 2006 Taiwanese film Eternal Summer, which earned him two Golden Horse Awards nominations for Best Supporting Actor and Best New Performer for his role as Yu Shouheng. He was also nominated in 2006, for Best Actor in a Miniseries or Television Film at the 41st Golden Bell Awards for his role as Paul in Corner of Auction World. He attended the Fu-Hsin Trade and Arts School (復興商工) in Taipei.

== Filmography ==
=== Film ===
Year	English title	Original title	Role	Notes/Ref.
2001	Real Star	真實的星空		Japanese film
2002	Drop Me a Cat	給我一隻貓	Ko Tat	
2006	Eternal Summer	盛夏光年	Yu Shou-heng	
2007	Keeping Watch	沈睡的青春	Chen Bai-yu	
2007	Surf's Up	—N/a	Cody Maverick	Mandarin dub (Taiwanese release)
2008	My So Called Love	愛的發聲練習	Xiao Ku	
2009	Ballistic	彈道	Xu Yu-chang	
2009	Step by Step	練戀舞	Liu Bi-ran	
2009	Prince of Tears	淚王子	Sun Han-sheng	
2009	Pinoy Sunday	台北星期天	Celia's boyfriend	Cameo
2010	Au Revoir Taipei	一頁台北	Jiyong	
2010	Cooking Without Clothes	煮持人	Jeff Tay	Television
2011	10+10	—N/a	The Man	Segment "Lane 256"
2012	Joyful Reunion	飲食男女— 好遠又好近	Bei Ming	
2012	Girlfriend, Boyfriend	女朋友 男朋友	Liam	
2012	Lavender	小幸感	Ji Yixiang's partner	Short film
2013	The Stolen Years	被偷走的那五年	Xie Yu	
2013	Soul	失魂	A-chuan	
2013	Dare to Love	勇敢去愛	Actor	Short film
2014	Meeting Dr. Sun	行動代號孫中山	School guard	Cameo
2014	Five Minutes to Tomorrow	深夜前的五分鐘	Ko Tien-lun	
2015	Murmur of the Hearts	念念	Hsiang	
2015	Wild City	迷城	Blackie	
2015	The Laundryman	青田街一號	No 1, Chingtian Street	
2015	Cities in Love	戀愛中的城市	A-chuan	
2016	Sky on Fire	沖天火	Jiajia	
2017	Love Contractually	合約男女	Xiao Bo	
2017	The Village of No Return	健忘村	Master Wan	
2017	A Nail Clipper Romance	指甲刀人魔	Zheng Jiwen	
2017	The Big Call	巨額來電	Lin Yahai	
2022	Fantasy·World	童话·世界	Chang Zheng-xu	
2022	The Post-Truth World	罪後真相	Liu Li-min	
2023	Be With Me	車頂上的玄天上帝		
2024	18×2 Beyond Youthful Days	青春18x2 通往有你的旅程 / 青春18×2 君へと続く道	Liu	Taiwanese-Japanese film

=== Television series ===
Year	English title	Original title	Role	Notes/Ref.
2001	Finding Mr Right	尋找Mr. Right	Wang Ke-ming	
2001	100% Girl	百分百女孩	Chia-jen	
2002	18 True Love	18歲的約定	Chu Ke-feng	
2002	Purple Corner	紫色角落	Lee An-da	
2003	Crystal Boys	孽子	Wu Min	
2003	Volcano	荒城火山	Chun-sheng	
2003	First Love	又見橘花香	Lo Chi-tung	
2003	Heart Train	心動列車	Chiang Yung-wen (A-chui)	
2004	Wish Upon a Star	星願	Yao-tien / Yao-sen	
2004	Legend of Speed	極速傳說	Mars	
2004	Blazing Courage	火線任務	Miao Zi-shou	
2006	Corner of Auction World	拍賣世界的角落	Paul	
2008	Hai Bian De Ren	海邊的人	A-lung	
2009	Life to Step Down	應屆退休生	Chang Fang-liang	
2010	Ni Yada	倪亞達	Wu Tian-liang	Special appearance
2011	Utopia Office	烏托邦辦公室	Qin Ran	Web series
2011	Love You	醉後決定愛上你	Sung Chieh-hsiu	
2018	Trading Floor	香港華爾街	Wei Hang	
2019	Nowhere Man	罪夢者	Ding Chang-quan (A-Quan)	
2019	Midnight Diner: Tokyo Stories	深夜食堂	Lee Pun Fa	Season 2, Episode 9
2020–2024	The Victims' Game	誰是被害者	Fang Yi-Jen	
2021	Pandora's Box	天目危机	Fu Bujie	
2022	Women in Taipei	台北女子圖鑒	Wu Zhi Fu	

=== Music video appearances ===
Year	Song title	Artist
2001	"下一次戀愛" ("Next Love")	Elva Hsiao
2001	"祝我幸福" ("Wish Me Happiness")	Faith Yang
2001	"未來" ("Future")	Sammi Cheng
2001	"戀人未滿" ("Not Yet Lovers")	S.H.E
2001	"有沒有一首歌會讓你想起我" ("Song That Reminds You of Me")	Wakin Chau
2001	"你說得對" ("You Are Right")	Wakin Chau
2003	"揮之不去"	Melody
2004	"局外者"	Chris Yu
2006	"愛了就懂了" ("Love Understand")	Tarcy Su
2006	"觸電" ("Electric Shock")	S.H.E
2006	"自戀" ("Narcissism")	Show Lo
2007	"傻瓜" ("Fool")	Landy Wen
2007	"明白" ("Understood")	Della
2007	"多餘" ("Excess")	Aska Yang
2010	"如果這就是愛情" ("If This is Love")	Jane Zhang
2010	"就這樣好了" ("It Will Be Just Fine")	Jane Zhang
2011	"外．賴"	William Wei
2011	"我們都傻" ("We Are All Silly")	Rainie Yang
2013	"方向" ("Direction")	Michelle Chen
2013	"悄悄告訴你" ("Secretly Telling You")	Christine Fan
2015	"Bird n' Tree"	Amber Kuo
2015	"糾纏" ("Twist")	Luantan Ascent
2015	"Paradise"	Kodabow
2017	"理智與感情" ("Sense And Sensibility")	Sammi Cheng
2021	"各自安好" ("Each Well")	Rene Liu

== Awards and nominations ==
Year	Award	Category	Nominated work	Result
2006	41st Golden Bell Awards	Best Actor in a Miniseries or Television Film	Corner of Auction World	Nominated
2006	43rd Golden Horse Awards	Best Supporting Actor	Eternal Summer	Nominated
2006	43rd Golden Horse Awards	Best New Performer	Eternal Summer	Nominated
2007	Chinese Film Media Awards	Best New Performer	Eternal Summer	Nominated
2011	46th Golden Bell Awards	Best Actor	Love You	Nominated
2012	14th Taipei Film Awards	Best Actor	Girlfriend, Boyfriend	Won
2012	49th Golden Horse Awards	Best Actor	Girlfriend, Boyfriend	Nominated
2012	Asia-Pacific Film Festival	Best Actor	Girlfriend, Boyfriend	Nominated
2012	Asia-Pacific Producers' Network Awards	Outstanding Actor	Girlfriend, Boyfriend	Won
2013	Chinese Film Media Awards	Favorite Actor	Girlfriend, Boyfriend	Nominated
2013	7th Asian Film Awards	Best Actor	Girlfriend, Boyfriend	Nominated
2013	7th Asian Film Awards	People's Choice Award for Favorite Actor	Girlfriend, Boyfriend	Nominated
2015	Osaka Asian Film Festival	Osaka Asia Star Award	—N/a	Won
2018	23rd Asian Television Awards	Best Actor	The Trading Floor	Nominated
2020	55th Golden Bell Awards	Best Leading Actor in a Television Series	The Victims' Game	Nominated
2020	55th Golden Bell Awards	Best Actor in a Miniseries or Television Film	Nowhere Man	Nominated
2022	24th Taipei Film Awards	Best Actor	Fantasy·World	Nominated
2022	59th Golden Horse Awards	Best Leading Actor	The Post-Truth World	Nominated
2026	New York Asian Film Festival	Star Asia Award	Best of Asian cinema	Honored
