= Vicky Chen =

Taiwanese actress

Wen Qi
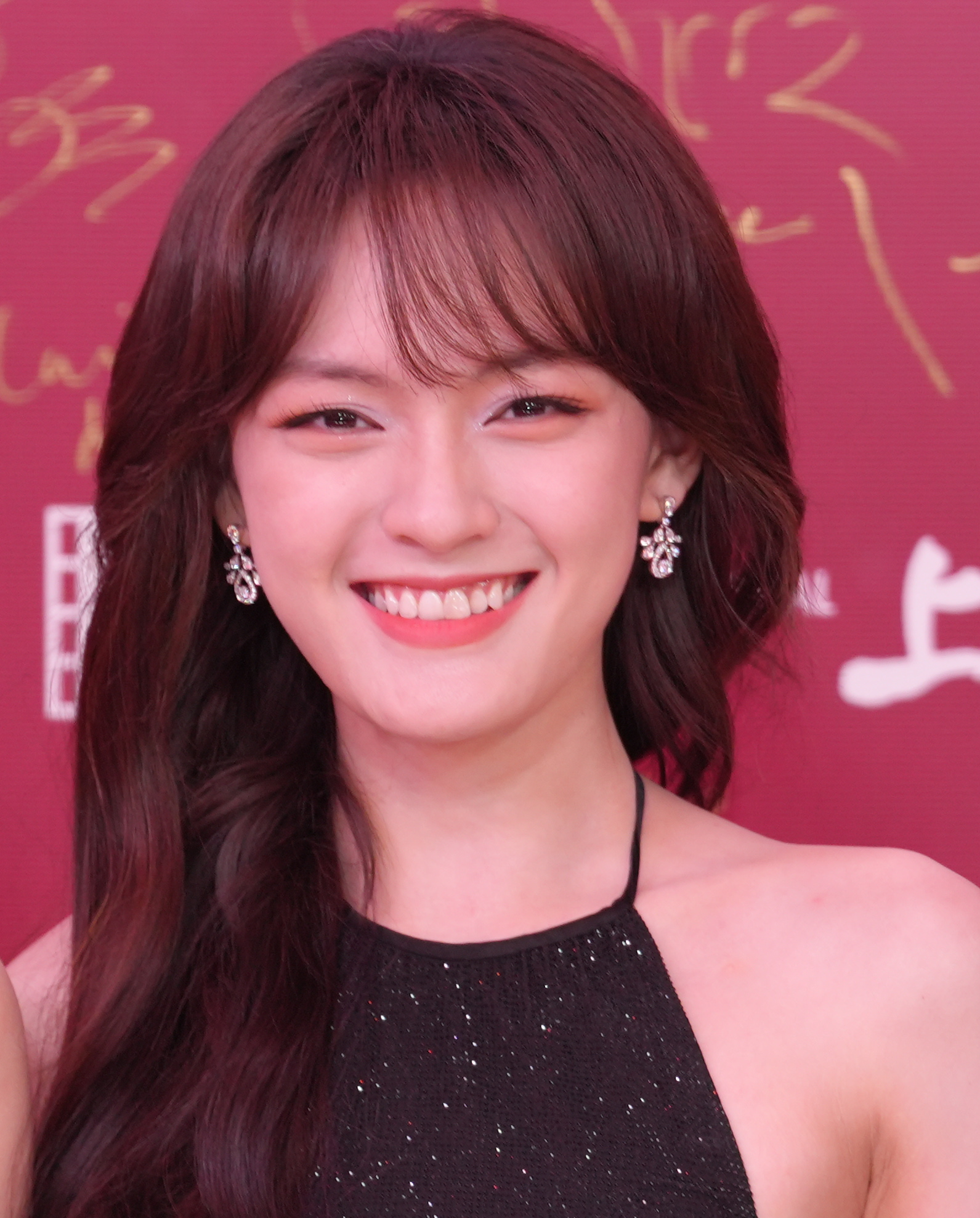
- Chen at 2026 Shanghai International Film Festival
- Born: Chen Wenqi (陈文淇); 10 August 2003 (age 23); Taipei, Taiwan
- Citizenship: Taiwan
- Education: Central Academy of Drama
- Occupation: Actress
- Years active: 2013–present

Chinese name
- Traditional Chinese: 文淇
Transcriptions
Standard Mandarin
- Hanyu Pinyin: Wén Qí

Wenqi "Vicky" Chen (Chinese: 陈文淇; pinyin: Chén Wénqí; born 10 August 2003), better known by her stage name Wen Qi (Chinese: 文淇; pinyin: Wénqí), is a Taiwanese actress. In 2017, she won the Golden Horse Award for Best Supporting Actress for the film The Bold, the Corrupt, and the Beautiful (2017) and became the second youngest actress who was nominated Golden Horse Award for Best Leading Actress for Angels Wear White (2017) when she was 14 years old. In 2019, Chen was named as one of the "New Four Dan actresses of the post-95s Generation" by CCTV-6.

== Filmography ==
=== Film ===
Year	English title	Original title	Role	Ref.
2013	Roller Coaster	过山车	Shasha	
2016	For a Few Bullets	快手枪手快枪手	Girl	
2016	Blood of Youth	少年	Lin Qiao (young)	
2017	Angels Wear White	嘉年华	Mia (Xiaomi)	
2017	The Bold, the Corrupt, and the Beautiful	血观音	Tang Chen	
2017	The Liquidator	心理罪之城市之光	Liao Yafan	
2019	Somewhere Winter	大约在冬季	Yu Xiaonian	
2019	Gone with the Light	被光抓走的人	Wu Xiaolei	
2022	Song of Spring	妈妈！	Zhou Xia	
2025	Girls on Wire	想飞的女孩	Fang Di	
2025	A Touch of Warm	驯鹿		
2026	It's OK	我，许可	Xu Ke	
2026	The Embers	我们仅有一次的人生	Yao Xue	
2026	The Boy Who Counted Cars	我看见两朵一样的云	Xiao Yi	
TBA	Flowers Bloom in the Ashes	尘埃里开花／少年时代		

=== Television / web series ===
Year	English title	Original title	Role	Notes/Ref.
2014	Lady's House	淑女之家	Fang Xiaoxi	
2015	Ku Ba Qiao Ma	酷爸俏妈	Sun Xiao	
2016	Yong Bao Xing Fu	拥抱幸福	Cherry	
2018	The Snow Queen	北国英雄	Guqi Lingyin	
2018	Eagles and Youngster	天坑鹰猎	Cai Gua	
2018	Concerts	音乐会	Jin Yingzi	
2021	My Treasure	生活家	Qiu Dongna	
2021	Wisher	致命愿望	Lu Li	
2023	The Bionic Life	仿生人间	An Qiu / An Qing	
2024	Braveness of the Ming	锦衣夜行	Xie Yufei (young)	
2025	I am Nobody: The Showdown Between Yin & Yang	异人之下之决战！碧游村	Chen Duo	
TBA	The New Version of the Condor Heroes	新神雕侠侣	Guo Xiang	

== Awards and nominations ==
Year	Award	Category	Nominated work	Result	Ref.
2017	54th Golden Horse Awards	Best Supporting Actress	The Bold, the Corrupt, and the Beautiful	Won	
2017	54th Golden Horse Awards	Best Leading Actress	Angels Wear White	Nominated	
2017	54th Antalya Golden Orange Film Festival	Best Actress	Angels Wear White	Won	
2018	9th China Film Director's Guild Awards	Best Actress	Angels Wear White	Nominated	
2018	49th Nashville Film Festival	Special Jury Prize for Best Young Actress	Angels Wear White	Won	
2018	15th Guangzhou College Student Film Festival	Favourite Actress	Angels Wear White	Won	
2018	46th FEST International Film Festival	Best Actress (Jury Prize- Main Program)	Angels Wear White	Won	
2018	23rd Shanghai Film Critics Awards	Best New Actress	Angels Wear White	Nominated	
2018	2nd Malaysia International Film Festival	Best Actress	Angels Wear White	Nominated	
2018	18th Chinese Film Media Awards	Best New Performer	Angels Wear White	Nominated	
2018	18th Chinese Film Media Awards	Audience Award for Best New Performer	Angels Wear White	Won	
2018	20th Taipei Film Awards	Best Supporting Actress	The Bold, the Corrupt, and the Beautiful	Won	
2023	25th Shanghai International Film Festival	Best Live Action Short Film	Questions to Heaven	Nominated	
