= Rhydian Vaughan =

Taiwanese-British actor

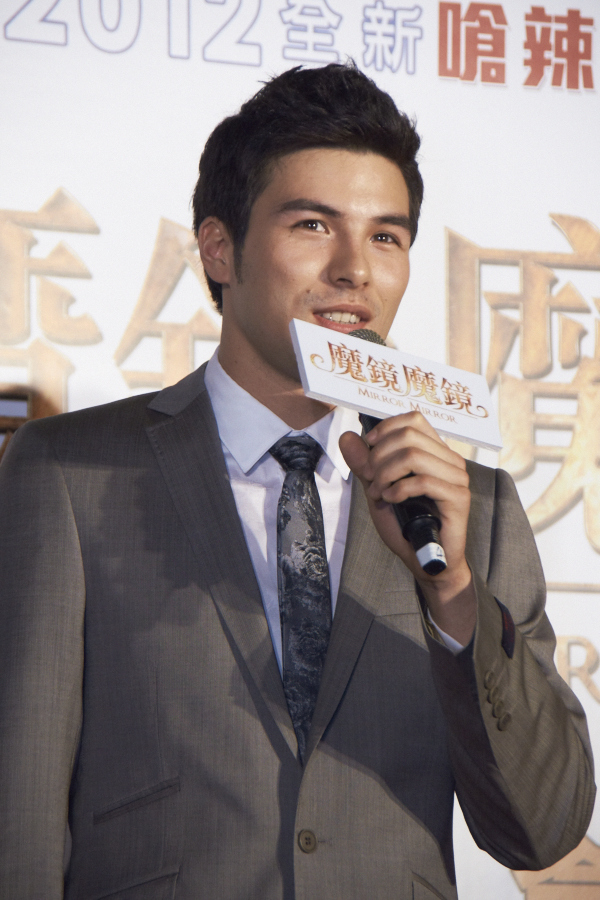
- Rhydian Vaughan in 2012
- Born: 10 March 1988 (age 38); Llanidloes, Wales, United Kingdom
- Education: East 15 Acting School
- Occupation: Actor
- Years active: 2008–present
- Spouse: Jessie Hong (m. 2016)
- Children: 1

Rhydian Vaughan
- Traditional Chinese: 鳳小岳
- Simplified Chinese: 凤小岳
Transcriptions
Standard Mandarin
- Hanyu Pinyin: Fèng Xiǎoyuè
- Wade–Giles: Fêng⁴ Hsiao³-yüeh⁴
Yue: Cantonese
- Jyutping: Fung6 Siu2-Ngok6
Southern Min
- Hokkien POJ: Hōng Siáu-ga̍k

Rhydian Vaughan (born 10 March 1988), also known by his stage name Feng Xiaoyue (鳳小岳), is a Taiwanese-Welsh actor. He is best known for his roles in the films Winds of September (2008), Monga (2010) and Girlfriend, Boyfriend (2012). In 2025, he won the Golden Bell Award for Best Leading Actor in a Miniseries or Television Film for The Cleaner.

== Early life ==
Vaughan is of Eurasian descent; his Taiwanese mother is a performance artist, while his British father is a violinist. Vaughan graduated from East 15 Acting School, a British performing arts school, in 2011.

== Filmography ==
=== Films ===
Year	English title	Original title	Role	Notes
2004	Lamb	神的孩子	Lu	Short film
2008	Winds of September	九降風	Yen	
2010	Monga	艋舺	Dragon Lee	
2012	The World Apart	—N/a	Jay	Short film
2012	Love	愛	Xiao Kuan's colleague	Cameo
2012	Girlfriend, Boyfriend	女朋友。男朋友	Aaron	
2013	Tiny Times	小時代	Gong Ming	
2013	Tiny Times 2	小時代：青木時代	Gong Ming	
2013	Zone Pro Site	總舖師	Street musician	Cameo
2015	Crazy New Year's Eve	一路驚喜	Willie	
2015	Chronicles of the Ghostly Tribe	九層妖塔	Chen Dong	
2015	The Vanished Murderer	消失的兇手	Mao-kin	
2016	My Best Friend's Wedding	我最好朋友的婚禮	Nick Young	
2016	My Egg Boy	我的蛋男情人	A-shi	
2016	Lord of Shanghai	上海王	Yu Qiyang	
2018	Reborn	解碼遊戲		
2018	Hotel Império	—N/a	Chu	

=== Television ===
Year	English title	Original title	Role
2011	Love Recipe	料理情人夢	Ho Hsia
2012	Die Sterntaler	白色之戀	Chu Yung-hsiu
2019	Bureau of Transformer	动物管理局	Qiao Zhi / George (Ep. 18-19)
2021	Dear Diary	我的巴比伦恋人	Murong Jie Lun / Hammurabi
2021	Light the Night	華燈初上	Chiang Han
2022	Women in Taipei	台北女子圖鑑	Allen
2023	Taiwan Crime Stories	台灣犯罪故事	Yu Chen-lang
2024	Let's Talk About CHU	愛愛內含光	Po-Chi
2024	The Cleaner	人生清理員	Chuan Lee

=== Music videos ===
Year	Artist	Song title
2006	Rainie Yang	"Sensitive" 過敏
2006	Rainie Yang	"The Left" 左邊
2006	Penny Tai	"By the Tamsui River" 淡水河邊
2009	Elva Hsiao	"Count Down" 倒數
2019	Jolin Tsai	"Romance" 愛的羅曼死
2021	JJ Lin	"Not Tonight" (Tomorrow Sounds Good Steve Aoki Remix)

== Discography ==
=== Singles ===
Year	Title	Notes
2010	"The Love Affair That Never Happened"	Acoustic guitar; Monga soundtrack
2014	"Everything You Wanted 你想要的一切"	Collaboration with Echo; Lyrics, music, vocals and acoustic guitar

== Awards and nominations ==
Award	Year	Category	Work	Result	Ref.
Asian Film Awards	2013	Best Supporting Actor	Girlfriend, Boyfriend	Nominated	
Golden Bell Awards	2025	Best Leading Actor in a Miniseries or Television Film	The Cleaner	Won	
Golden Melody Awards	2024	Best New Artist	Seven	Nominated	
