= Women in Taipei =

Taiwanese television series

Chinese name
- Traditional Chinese: 台北女子圖鑑
- Simplified Chinese: 台北女子图鉴
Transcriptions
Standard Mandarin
- Hanyu Pinyin: Táiběi nǚzǐ tújiàn
- Genre: Drama
- Directed by: Lee Yun-chan
- Starring: Gwei Lun-mei; Wang Po-chieh; Kimi Hsia; Austin Lin; Rhydian Vaughan; Cosmos Lin
- Country of origin: Taiwan
- Original language: Mandarin
- No. of seasons: 1
- No. of episodes: 11

Production
- Producer: Tung Ting-an
- Running time: 44-55 minutes
- Production company: Sequoia Entertainment

Original release
- Network: Disney+ Star+ Hulu
- Release: 21 September 2022 – November 23, 2022

Women in Taipei (Chinese: 台北女子圖鑑) is a 2022 Taiwanese television series that is an adaptation of the 2016 Japanese series Tokyo Girl. Both series were inspired by the Tokyo Women's Campaign column that appeared in Tokyo Calendar magazine in 2015. The series premiered on September 21, 2022, as an original through Disney+ via Star. The series stars Gwei Lun-mei, Wang Po-chieh, Kimi Hsia, Rhydian Vaughan, and Cosmos Lin.

== Synopsis ==
Lin Yi-shan leaves her old and familiar life in Yongkang District of Tainan, to make a fresh start in Taipei. But her plans go horribly wrong and she increasingly doubts her decision. Luckily, Lin Yi-shan still has the "Tainan Gang", which includes her best friend Xu Hui-ru, her sister Lin Yi-jing, and childhood friend Li Cheng-en. With the gang's support, Lin Yi-shan is able to find new hope and together they face the future, which holds some challenges for them. What will their lives be like in 20 years' time?

== Cast ==
=== Main starring ===
Role	Actor/Actress	Description
Lin Yi-shan	Gwei Lun-mei	A woman who moved from Yongkang, Tainan to Taipei, nicknamed "Sandy".
Li Cheng-en	Wang Po-chieh	Investment consultant researcher whose father owns a pastry shop in Tainan, Lin Yi-shan's childhood sweetheart.
Xu Hui-ru	Kimi Hsia	Real Estate Commissioner, later Headhunter Consultant, Lin Yi-shan's best friend
Lin Yi-jing	Cosmos Lin	E-sports player, sister of Lin Yishan.

== Episodes ==
Episode Number	English Title	Original Title	First Released
1	Shattered Taipei Dream	從台南永康到台北永康，碎了一地的台北夢	21 September 2022
2	The End of Happiness in New Taipei City	新北市的新貧階級，看見小確幸的盡頭	21 September 2022
3	Fast-Food Relationships in Ximending	揮霍愛情中告別青春，在西門町享受著速食愛情	28 September 2022
4	Seesaw of Power in the East District	權力關係的蹺蹺板，用自信妝點東區的女人們	5 October 2022
5	The Romantic Bloodshed in Ren'ai Roundabout	仁愛圓環裡的修羅場，第三者的遊戲規則	12 October 2022
6	The Invisible Tower of Babel in Xinyi District	信義區隱形的巴別塔，三十歲落後人生	19 October 2022
7	The Almost Soulmate on the Road Leaving Dazhi	離開大直的路沒有鋪紅毯，只差一點的靈魂伴侶	26 October 2022
8	The Sweet and Clingy Taste of Chifeng Street	赤峰街甜膩滋味，65天的限定情書	2 November 2022
9	Pros and Cons of Being Single. Marina Bay Adventures, Part 1	一個人，好不好？濱海灣的異國冒險(上)	9 November 2022
10	Where Is Home? Marina Bay Adventures, Part 2	家，在哪裏？濱海灣的異國冒險(下)	16 November 2022
11	This Is Who I Am: A New Woman in Taipei	終於成為了民生社區的台北女子	23 November 2022
