= Hong Kong Film Award for Best Film from Mainland and Taiwan =

Former annual Chinese film award

Hong Kong Film Award for Best Film From Mainland and Taiwan
- Awarded for: Best Film From Mainland and Taiwan
- Country: Hong Kong
- Presented by: Hong Kong Film Awards
- First award: 2012
- Final award: 2019
- Currently held by: Dying to Survive (2019)

The Hong Kong Film Award for Best Film From Mainland And Taiwan is a retired annual Hong Kong industry award presented for a film considered the best of the year. To be eligible for the award films had to be in a Chinese language and have at least one film company legally registered in mainland China or Taiwan.

== History ==
- This award replaced the Hong Kong Film Award for Best Asian Film.
- The first award was presented during the 2012 31st Hong Kong Film Awards ceremony for the film You Are the Apple of My Eye directed by Giddens Ko.
- This award has been replaced by the Hong Kong Film Award for Best Asian Chinese Language Film since the 39th Hong Kong Film Awards.

== Winners and nominees ==
Table key
‡	Indicates the winner

Year	Film	Directed by	Ref.
2012 (31st)	You Are the Apple of My Eye	Giddens Ko	
2012 (31st)	The Flowers of War	Zhang Yimou	
2012 (31st)	If You Are the One 2	Feng Xiaogang	
2012 (31st)	Starry Starry Night	Tom Lin Shu-yu	
2012 (31st)	Warriors of the Rainbow: Seediq Bale	Wei Te-sheng	
2013 (32nd)	Back to 1942	Feng Xiaogang	
2013 (32nd)	Girlfriend, Boyfriend	Ya-che Yang	
2013 (32nd)	Love Is Not Blind	Hua-Tao Teng	
2013 (32nd)	Painted Skin: The Resurrection	Wuershan	
2013 (32nd)	Love	Doze Niu	
2014 (33rd)	So Young	Zhao Wei	
2014 (33rd)	Rock Me to the Moon	Huang Jia Jun	
2014 (33rd)	Lost in Thailand	Xu Zheng	
2014 (33rd)	The Last Supper	Lu Chuan	
2014 (33rd)	Touch of the Light	Chang Jung-Chi	
2015 (34th)	Coming Home	Zhang Yimou	
2015 (34th)	Black Coal, Thin Ice	Diao Yinan	
2015 (34th)	Paradise in Service	Doze Niu	
2015 (34th)	No Man's Land	Ning Hao	
2015 (34th)	Café. Waiting. Love	Chiang Chin-lin Jiang Jinlin	
2016 (35th)	The Assassin	Hou Hsiao-hsien	
2016 (35th)	Mountains May Depart	Jia Zhangke	
2016 (35th)	Our Times	Yu Shan Chen	
2016 (35th)	Wolf Totem	Jean-Jacques Annaud	
2016 (35th)	Blind Massage	Lou Ye	
2017 (36th)	Godspeed	Chung Mong-hong	
2017 (36th)	Chongqing Hot Pot	Yang Qing	
2017 (36th)	Mr. Six	Guan Hu	
2017 (36th)	The Road To Mandalay	Midi Z	
2017 (36th)	I Am Not Madame Bovary	Feng Xiaogang	

== See also ==
- Hong Kong Film Award for Best Asian Chinese Language Film
