= Girlfriend, Boyfriend =

- Theatrical release poster
- Directed by: Yang Ya-che
- Written by: Yang Ya-che
- Produced by: Yeh Ju-feng; Liu Weijan
- Starring: Gwei Lun-mei; Joseph Chang; Rhydian Vaughan
- Cinematography: Jake Pollock
- Edited by: Chen Chung-hung
- Music by: Chung Hsing-min
- Production companies: Atom Cinema; Ocean Deep Films; Central Motion Pictures
- Distributed by: Atom Cinema
- Release date: August 3, 2012
- Running time: 105 minutes
- Country: Taiwan
- Languages: Mandarin; Taiwanese
- Box office: US$64,414 (U.S)

Girlfriend, Boyfriend (also stylized as Gf*Bf) is a 2012 Taiwanese drama film written and directed by Yang Ya-che. The film was released on August 3, 2012.

Of the film, director Yang stated that while he did not intentionally set out to make a "gay movie, but a political one, one which happened to include a gay character"., he further stated that homosexuality and politics "both in fact represent the theme of freedom".

== Synopsis ==
In the 1980s, high school students Aaron, Mabel and Liam are best friends and also caught in a love triangle. As the three friends go through the turbulent times, when social revolution takes hold over martial law, their relationships go through many ups and downs.

== Cast ==
- Gwei Lun-mei as Mabel
- Joseph Chang as Liam
- Rhydian Vaughan as Aaron
- Bryan Chang as Sean
- Serena Fang as Hsiao-bao, Aaron's wife
- Russell Tang as John Hsu, Liam's boyfriend
- Ding Ning as Hanako, Mabel's mother
- Nita Lei as Hsiao Yun
- J.C. Lei as Hsiao Shu

== Reception ==
Critical reception for Girlfriend, Boyfriend has been mixed to positive, with review aggregator Rotten Tomatoes giving the film a rating of 67%, based on 12 reviews. The New York Times cited the performance of Gwei Lun-mei as a highlight, saying that she was "by turns brazen and uncertain, fragile and steely". In comparison, the Los Angeles Times panned the film, stating that it "[failed] to connect" and that it "can't balance its story lines of romance and societal change".

== Awards and nominations ==
Award	Category	Recipients	Result
55th Asia-Pacific Film Festival	Best Actress	Gwei Lun-mei	Won
55th Asia-Pacific Film Festival	Best Actor	Joseph Chang	Nominated
55th Asia-Pacific Film Festival	Best Screenplay	Yang Ya-che	Nominated
55th Asia-Pacific Film Festival	Best Sound	Tu Duu-chih	Nominated
7th Asian Film Awards	Best Actor	Joseph Chang	Nominated
7th Asian Film Awards	Best Actress	Gwei Lun-mei	Nominated
7th Asian Film Awards	Best Supporting Actor	Rhydian Vaughan	Nominated
7th Asian Film Awards	People's Choice Award - Favorite Actor	Joseph Chang	Nominated
7th Asian Film Awards	People's Choice Award - Favorite Actress	Gwei Lun-mei	Nominated
13th Chinese Film Media Awards	Best Actress	Gwei Lun-mei	Nominated
49th Golden Horse Awards	Best Feature Film	Girlfriend, Boyfriend	Nominated
49th Golden Horse Awards	Audience Choice Award	Girlfriend, Boyfriend	Won
49th Golden Horse Awards	Best Director	Yang Ya-che	Nominated
49th Golden Horse Awards	Best Actor	Joseph Chang	Nominated
49th Golden Horse Awards	Best Actress	Gwei Lun-mei	Won
49th Golden Horse Awards	Best Supporting Actor	Bryan Chang	Nominated
49th Golden Horse Awards	Best Original Screenplay	Yang Ya-che	Nominated
49th Golden Horse Awards	Best Cinematography	Jake Pollock	Nominated
32nd Hong Kong Film Awards	Best Film from Mainland and Taiwan	Girlfriend, Boyfriend	Nominated
14th Taipei Film Awards	Best Actor	Joseph Chang	Won
14th Taipei Film Awards	Best Supporting Actor	Bryan Chang	Won
14th Taipei Film Awards	Press Award	Girlfriend, Boyfriend	Won
