= The Big Call (film) =

- Theatrical release poster

Chinese name
- Traditional Chinese: 巨額來電 猜猜我是誰 (Hong Kong and Taiwan)
- Simplified Chinese: 巨额来电
Transcriptions
Standard Mandarin
- Hanyu Pinyin: Jù é lái diàn
- Directed by: Oxide Pang
- Written by: Liu Hua; Oxide Pang
- Produced by: Alvin Lam; Chen Xiangyu; Fu Yexin; Liu Kailuo; Lu Yunlong; Peng Mingyu; Tang Ke; Zhang Huixia
- Starring: Cheney Chen; Joseph Chang; Gwei Lun-mei; Jiang Mengjie
- Cinematography: Chan Wai-Lin
- Edited by: Oxide Pang; Pipat Sawaddee
- Music by: Ittichet Chawang
- Production companies: Universe Entertainment; Hainingzhuoyue Film & Television Investment; HG Entertainment Co. China Movie Channel
- Distributed by: Universe Films Distribution
- Release date: 8 December 2017
- Running time: 123 minutes
- Country: China
- Language: Mandarin

The Big Call (Chinese: 巨額來電; formerly known as Fraud Squad), is a 2017 Chinese crime drama film directed by Oxide Pang, starring Cheney Chen, Joseph Chang, Gwei Lun-mei and Jiang Mengjie.

== Cast ==
- Cheney Chen as Ding Xiaotian
- Joseph Chang as Lin Yahai
- Gwei Lun-mei as Liu Lifang
- Jiang Mengjie as Xu Xiaotu
- Jiang Chao
- Cheung Siu-fai as Tan Sirong
- Tony Ho
- John Ching
- Ken Lok as Lu Chixiong
- Peng Xinchen as Lin Xiaoqin
- Zuo Kan as Qiqi
