= Blue Gate Crossing =

- Blue Gate Crossing DVD cover
- Directed by: Yee Chih-yen
- Written by: Yee Chih-yen
- Produced by: Peggy Chiao; Wang Toon; Hsu Hsiao-ming; Hsu Bing-xi; Zhang Zhi-wei
- Starring: Bolin Chen; Gwei Lun-mei; Yolin Liang
- Cinematography: Qian Xiang
- Edited by: Liao Qing-song
- Music by: Chris Hou
- Distributed by: Arc Light Films; Strand Releasing (USA)
- Release date: 27 September 2002 (Taiwan)
- Running time: 83 minutes
- Country: Taiwan
- Language: Mandarin
- Box office: >NT$5 million

Blue Gate Crossing (Chinese: 藍色大門; pinyin: lánsè dà mén) is a 2002 Taiwanese LGBT coming of age romantic drama film directed and written by Yee Chih-yen. It was screened at the Directors' Fortnight section of the 2002 Cannes Film Festival and was nominated for Best Asian Film at the 23rd Hong Kong Film Awards held in 2004. The film grossed over five million New Taiwan dollars at the box office in Taiwan, which was a rare achievement for a Taiwanese film in the 2000s.

== Plot ==
Meng Kerou and Lin Yuezhen are classmates and best friends. While trying to imagine their future, Yuezhen tells Kerou that she likes Zhang Shihao, a boy from the same grade who's in the swim team and the guitar club, and points him out to her.

Yuezhen calls out Kerou at night and they sneak into the school where Shihao secretly trains in the swimming pool at night. When Yuezhen wonders if he has a girlfriend and if he would be interested in her, Kerou tries to agitate Yuezhen by yelling the questions to Shihao, who is oblivious to Yuezhen also being there. He notices Kerou and they hide from the night guard. Kerou asks him if he is interested in her friend. He thinks she is being shy and inquiring for herself. When Kerou wants to show him Yuezhen, she has disappeared.

Yuezhen has a deep crush on Shihao and asks Kerou to help her deliver a love letter. Kerou does so unwillingly. To her surprise and anger, Yuezhen signed the letter with Kerou's name. Shihao is still convinced that Kerou is into him and has developed a crush on her. After they face a school punishment together and Shihao follows her around, he asks her out. Kerou is not interested in him, but gives him a chance. They go to the beach, where Kerou asks Shihao to kiss her. He gets shy and holds her hand. Later that night, Kerou runs into her gym teacher and also asks him to kiss her. After he fails to respond quickly, she drives off on her bike.

The next day at school, the gym teacher tries to confront her, but Kerou is not interested and runs to Shihao. She grabs his hand to get rid of the teacher. Rumors have already been around about Kerou and Shihao. Yuezhen has been avoiding Kerou, who's hurt but also developing a bond with Shihao. After Kerou and Yuezhen reconcile, Kerou asks Shihao to stop following her around. He is confused and asks her to explain herself. Kerou confesses that she thinks she likes girls and is in love with Yuezhen. She was trying to see if she could feel anything if she kissed a boy.

She tries to set up Yuezhen and Shihao after that. Shihao is not into Yuezhen and turns her down in the end. Shihao advises Kerou to confess to Yuezhen. When she does, Yuezhen gives her the cold shoulder. Kerou is heartbroken. Yuezhen burns all of her Shihao memorabilia on the roof. Shihao calls Kerou to ask her to come to his swimming competition.

Kerou does not go, decides then she does want to go, but is too late. Shihao and Kerou meet later and Shihao says it's okay Kerou didn't show, because he swam badly. They reconcile as friends, but Shihao asks Kerou to let him know first when she starts liking boys, no matter in how many years.

== Cast ==
The filming location for Blue Gate Crossing was the Affiliated Senior High School of National Taiwan Normal University in Taipei, and the three main characters in the story also attend this school.

- Gwei Lun-mei as Meng Kerou

Meng Kerou comes from a single-parent family and helps her family make a living by running a snack bar. She has a crush on Lin Yuezhen and agrees to help her deliver a love letter to Zhang Shihao, but Zhang Shihao misunderstands and thinks that Meng Kerou is the one expressing her own feelings for him.

- Yolin Liang as Lin Yuezhen

Kerou's classmate who likes Zhang Shihao but is too shy to confess her feelings. She asks her friend Meng Kerou to help her express her love to Zhang Shihao, but she runs away at the last minute, causing Zhang Shihao to mistake Kerou as the one writing the letter.

- Chen Bolin as Zhang Shihao

Scorpio with blood type O, Zhang Shihao participates in the guitar club and the swimming team. He is simple-minded, straightforward, and has a liking for Meng Kerou. His biggest wish, besides winning the swimming competition, is to become Kerou's boyfriend.

- Joanna Chou as Mrs. Meng
- Jay Shih (Cameo) as Pipi

== Soundtrack ==
The film's score was composed by Chris Hou. Its soundtrack also features a theme composed specifically for the film, "A Little Step" by Cheer Chen, as well as two additional licensed tracks: "Encouragement of Love" (愛的鼓勵) by Taiwanese band 1976, and "Accidentally Kelly Street" by Australian group Frente!.

=== Main theme: A Little Step ===
- Music and Lyrics Composer: Cheer Chen
- Arrangement: Li Yu-huan
- Performer: Cheer Chen

=== Other licensed tracks ===
- 1976 - "Encouragement of Love" (愛的鼓勵)
- Frente! - "Accidentally Kelly Street"

== Reception ==
The film has been well-received critically. Dennis Lim, in a review for the Village Voice, observed the film's "meticulous framing and haunting use of repeated motifs" reflects the influence of Taiwanese New Wave directors Hou Hsiao-hsien and Edward Yang. The Portland Mercury described the film as "a modern-day Chinese lesbian twist on the old Cyrano story" that "treads new territory in the teen coming of age drama realm," praising Yee Chih-yen's "haiku-like directorial lyricism."

The New York Times film critic, Stephen Holden, praised Blue Gate Crossing as "little more than a vignette elongated into a feature-length movie. Moody and slow moving, it depends on the truthfulness of its performances to carry it." Holden also applauded Gwei Lun-mei's character, Meng Kerou, "the most developed character, [...] a carefully understated portrait of youthful determination and stoic suffering. Meng Kerou doesn't walk so much as she marches around the high school, suppressing her emotions while pondering her future."

Eighteen years after its initial release, Blue Gate Crossing continues to be celebrated by the international film circuits. Asian Movie Pulse writer, Oriana Virone, reported that, the Queer East Film Festival that took place from October 2020 to January 2021 "opened its first edition with a screening of the Taiwanese critically acclaimed film: Blue Gate Crossing. Icing on the cake, it has been shown in 35 mm." To overcome the impact of COVID-19, the festival screened the film with an extended pre-recorded introduction with director Yee Chih-yen.

== Events ==
- 2002：Cannes Film Festival "Directors' Fortnight"
- 2002：Toronto International Film Festival
- 2002：Tokyo International Film Festival
- 2002：Busan International Film Festival
- 2002：Seattle International Film Festival Competition
- 2002：Vancouver Film Festival
- 2003：Bangkok Film Festival
- 2003：Adelaide Film Festival
- 2003：Istanbul International Film Festival
- 2003：San Francisco International LGBT Film Festival
- 2003：Dublin LGBT Film Festival
- 2003：Milwaukee LGBT Film & Video Festival
- 2002：Asia Pacific Film Festival
- 2004：Belgium Holebi LGBT Film Festival

== Anecdotes ==
- The outdoor swimming pool in the film was eventually retired and rebuilt into an indoor swimming pool.
