= Golden Goblet Award for Best Live Action Short Film =

Chinese film award

The Golden Goblet Award for Best Live Action Short Film (Chinese: 金爵奖最佳真人短片) is a highest prize awarded to short films in the live action category of short film competition at the Shanghai International Film Festival since 2017.

== Award winners ==
Year	Film	Country
2017	Baka	(Germany) Arvid Klapper
2018	White Sheep in the Car	(China) Xu Min, Tan Diwen
2019	Nowhere to Put	(China)
