= Gwei Lun-mei =

Taiwanese actress

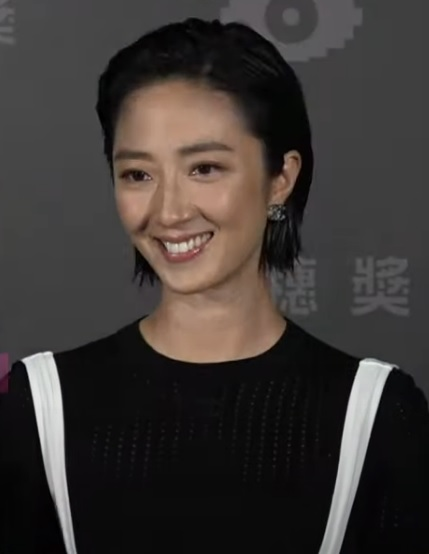
- Gwei in June 2022
- Born: 25 December 1983 (age 42); Taipei, Taiwan
- Other names: Guey Lun-mei; Kwai Lun-mei; Gui Lun-mei; Guei Lun-mei
- Education: Tamkang University; Jean Moulin University Lyon 3
- Occupation: Actress
- Years active: 2002–present
- Awards: Golden Horse Awards – Best Leading Actress; 2012 Girlfriend, Boyfriend

Chinese name
- Traditional Chinese: 桂綸鎂
- Simplified Chinese: 桂纶镁
- Hanyu Pinyin: Guì Lúnměi
- Hokkien POJ: Kùi Lûn-bí

Gwei Lun-mei (Chinese: 桂綸鎂; pinyin: Guì Lúnměi; Pe̍h-ōe-jī: Kùi Lûn-bí; born 25 December 1983) is a Taiwanese actress. She started her acting career in 2002, with the film Blue Gate Crossing. Gwei then appeared in a few more films before achieving wide recognition for the film Secret (2007), directed by Jay Chou, in which Gwei played the character of Lu Hsiao-yu.

In 2012, Gwei starred in Girlfriend, Boyfriend, a coming-of-age drama in which three teenagers navigate their attraction to one another – from their high school years into their adulthood. The film won Gwei a Best Leading Actress award at the 49th Golden Horse Awards.

== Personal life ==
Gwei has been in a long-term relationship with actor and filmmaker Leon Dai since 2004.

== Filmography ==
=== Film ===
Year	English title	Original title	Role	Notes
2002	Blue Gate Crossing	藍色大門	Meng Ke-rou	
2003	Sound of Colors	地下鐵	Zhong Qing's unrequited love	
2004	The Passage	經過	A-ching	
2007	The Most Distant Course	最遙遠的距離	Hsiao-yun	
2007	Secret	不能說的·秘密	Lu Hsiao-yu	
2008	All About Women	女人不壞	Tieh Ling	
2008	Séance familiale	闔家觀賞	Hsiao-fen	Short film; alternative title: Family Viewing
2008	Parking	停車	Wife	
2010	Taipei Exchanges	第36個故事	Doris	
2010	Ocean Heaven	海洋天堂	Lingling	alternative title: Ocean Paradise
2010	The Stool Pigeon	綫人	Dee	
2011	Rest on Your Shoulder	肩上蝶	Bai Lan	
2011	Flying Swords of Dragon Gate	龍門飛甲	Burudu / Chang Hsiao-wen	
2011	Love in Space	全球熱戀	Lily	
2011	Starry Starry Night	星空	Hsiao-mei (adult)	
2011	10+10	十加十	Li, the young woman	Segment "Key"
2012	5 Days After	愛在五日以後	A worker	Short film
2012	Girlfriend, Boyfriend	女朋友。男朋友	Mabel	
2013	Christmas Rose	聖誕玫瑰	Li Jing	
2013	The Mysterious Attraction	神秘吸引力		Short film
2014	Black Coal, Thin Ice	白日焰火	Wu Zhizhen	
2014	Fleet of Time	匆匆那年	Passer-by	Cameo
2014	One Step Away	觸不可及	Ning Dai	
2016	The Moment	我們的那時此刻	Narrator	Documentary
2016	Forêt Debussy	德布西森林	The Daughter	
2017	Beautiful Accident	美好的意外	Li Yuran	
2017	The Big Call	巨額來電	Liu Lifang	
2018	On Happiness Road	幸福路上	Hsiao-chi	Voice
2019	The Wild Goose Lake	南方車站的聚會	Liu Aiai	
2020	City of Lost Things	廢棄之城	GPS	Voice
2020	A Leg	腿	Qian Yuying	
2024	Weekend in Taipei	台北追緝令; Week-end à Taipei	Joey Kwang	

=== Television ===
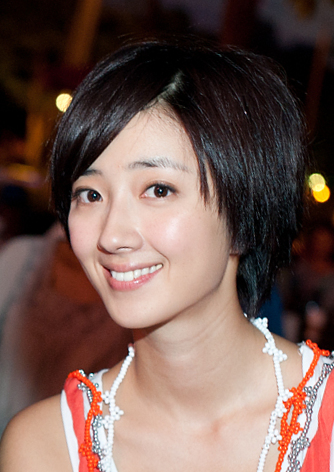
Gwei in 2010

Year	English title	Original title	Role	Notes
2006	Dangerous Mind	危險心靈	Alley Lin	
2008	Police et vous	波麗士大人	Huang Fang-yi	
2018	The Trading Floor	東方華爾街	Anna	
2022	Women In Taipei	台北女子圖鑑	Lin Yishan	Disney+ original series

=== Music video appearances ===
Year	Artist	Song title
2001	Cheer Chen	"A Little Step"
2003	Tanya Chua	"Deep"
2004	F.I.R.	"Our Love"
2006	Michael Wong	"All Is You"
2007	Jay Chou	"Secret"
2010	Jay Chou	"Say Goodbye"
2010	Michael Wong	"So Naive"
2015	Rene Liu	"Wish You Well"

=== Variety and reality show ===
Year	English title	Original title	Network	Notes
2014	Chef Nic	12道鋒味	Zhejiang Television	Season 1, episode 7
2022	Extreme Forest	極島森林	Disney+	Episodes 10-12

== Discography ==
Year	Song title	Album
2006	"I Dream Of"	Dangerous Mind Soundtrack
2008	"Hello Microphone"	All About Women Soundtrack
2009	"Ocean to the Land"	No Puedo Vivir Sin Ti Soundtrack
2010	"Ocean Heaven"	Ocean Heaven Soundtrack
2015	"Wish You Well" (with Rene Liu, Zhou Xun and Tang Wei)	Wish You Well

== Awards and nominations ==
Year	Award	Category	Nominated work	Result
2011	2nd China Film Director's Guild Awards	Best Actress	The Stool Pigeon	Nominated
2011	Hong Kong Film Critics Society Awards	Best Actress	The Stool Pigeon	Nominated
2012	31st Hundred Flowers Awards	Best Supporting Actress	Flying Swords of Dragon Gate	Nominated
2012	31st Hong Kong Film Awards	Best Supporting Actress	Flying Swords of Dragon Gate	Nominated
2012	6th Asian Film Awards	Best Supporting Actress	Flying Swords of Dragon Gate	Nominated
2012	49th Golden Horse Awards	Best Leading Actress	Girlfriend, Boyfriend	Won
2012	Asia-Pacific Film Festival	Best Actress	Girlfriend, Boyfriend	Won
2013	7th Asian Film Awards	Best Actress	Girlfriend, Boyfriend	Nominated
2013	7th Asian Film Awards	People's Choice Award for Favorite Actress	Girlfriend, Boyfriend	Nominated
2013	13th Chinese Film Media Awards	Best Actress	Girlfriend, Boyfriend	Nominated
2013	50th Golden Horse Awards	Best Leading Actress	Christmas Rose	Nominated
2014	21st Beijing College Student Film Festival	Favorite Actress	Black Coal, Thin Ice	Won
2014	21st Beijing College Student Film Festival	Best Actress	Black Coal, Thin Ice	Nominated
2014	51st Golden Horse Awards	Best Leading Actress	Black Coal, Thin Ice	Nominated
2015	6th China Film Director's Guild Awards	Best Actress	Black Coal, Thin Ice	Nominated
2015	Huading Awards	Best Actress in a Motion Picture	Black Coal, Thin Ice	Nominated
2020	57th Golden Horse Awards	Best Leading Actress	A Leg	Nominated
2023	58th Golden Bell Awards	Best Leading Actress in a TV Series	Women in Taipei	Nominated
