= Beijing Blues =

- Film poster
- Directed by: Gao Qunshu
- Written by: Gao Qunshu; Dai Yan
- Cinematography: Wu Di
- Edited by: Yang Hongyu
- Production companies: Beijing Yuanxin International Culture and Media; Shanghai Inlook Media Group; Beijing Enlight Pictures
- Distributed by: Beijing Enlight Pictures
- Release date: July 20, 2012 (China)
- Running time: 114 minutes
- Country: China
- Language: Mandarin Chinese

Beijing Blues (Chinese: 神探亨特张; pinyin: Shéntàn Hēngtè Zhāng; lit. 'Divine Detective Hunter Zhang') is a 2012 Chinese crime drama film directed by Gao Qunshu. It won Best Feature Film, Best Cinematography, and Best Film Editing at the Golden Horse Film Festival and Awards in 2012.
