= Tokyo Girl (2016 TV series) =

- Written by: Hisako Kurosawa
- Country of origin: Japan
- Original language: Japanese

Original release
- Release: 2016 – 2017

Tokyo Girl (東京女子図鑑), or Tôkyô Joshi Zukan, is a Japanese television drama series that aired in 2016–2017, written by Hisako Kurosawa and directed by Yuki Tanada. The show was streamed on Amazon Prime starting in 2018.

== Premise ==
The show follows the life of a woman named Aya, originally from the town of Akita, Japan. The 11 episodes span her life from about the age 18 to age 45. Each episode shows a snapshot of her life, and the episodes are spaced every few years. The title of each episode is the name of the neighborhood in Tokyo where she is living at that point in her life.

== Cast ==
- Asami Mizukawa as Aya
- Tsuyoshi Abe
- Masako Chiba
- Shiina Hanasaka
- Hana Hizuki
- Shôhei Ueki

== Adaptations ==
- Women in Taipei
