= Gao Qunshu =

Chinese film director

- Occupation: Film director

Gao Qunshu (Chinese: 高群书) is a Chinese film director.

== Filmography ==
- The Tokyo Trial (2006)
- Old Fish (2008)
- The Message (2009)
- Wind Blast (2010)
- Beijing Blues (2012)
- Crimes of Passion (2013)
- The New Year's Eve of Old Lee (2016)
- Run for Love (2016)
