= Touch of the Light =

2012 Taiwanese drama film

- Poster
- Directed by: Chang Jung-chi
- Written by: Nyssa Li
- Produced by: Jacky Pang; Cheung Hong-tat
- Starring: Sandrine Pinna; Huang Yu-siang
- Cinematography: Dylan Doyle
- Edited by: Nyssa Li
- Music by: Wen Tzu-chieh; Huang Yu-siang
- Production companies: Block 2 Pictures; Jet Tone Production
- Distributed by: Warner Bros. Pictures
- Release dates: 30 June 2012 (Taipei Film Festival); 21 September 2012 (Taiwan)
- Running time: 110 minutes
- Country: Taiwan
- Language: Mandarin
- Box office: US$1.4 million

Touch of the Light (Chinese: 逆光飛翔; pinyin: Nìguāng fēixiáng) is a 2012 Taiwanese drama film directed by Chang Jung-chi. The film was selected as the Taiwanese entry for the Best Foreign Language Oscar at the 85th Academy Awards, but it did not make the final shortlist.

== Plot ==
The story revolves around a blind music student who excels at piano but faces hardships due to his disability, and an aspiring dancer who works at a bubble tea store. Their friendship becomes mutually uplifting as they pursue their dreams.

== Cast ==
- Sandrine Pinna as Hsiao-chieh
- Huang Yu-siang as Huang Yu-siang
- Lee Lieh as Yu-siang's mother
- Ko Shu-chin as Hsiao-chieh's mother
- Ayugo Huang as Yu-siang's father
- Na Dou as Hsiao-chieh's boss
- Harry Chang as Hsiao-chieh's boyfriend
- Sheu Fang-yi as Teacher Hsu
- Ivy Yin as Teacher Wang
- Hsueh Shih-ling as A-hsien

== Soundtrack ==
Touch of the Light Original Soundtrack

Soundtrack album by Various artists
- Released: 26 October 2012
- Genre: Film soundtrack
- Label: Asia Muse

No.	Title	Performers	Length
1.	"Intro"	Huang Yu-siang, Wen Tzu-chieh	02:54
2.	"啟程"	Huang Yu-siang, Wen Tzu-chieh	01:28
3.	"放不下的牽掛"	Huang Yu-siang, Wen Tzu-chieh	01:40
4.	"擦肩而過"	Huang Yu-siang, Wen Tzu-chieh	00:27
5.	"我在你後面"	Huang Yu-siang, Wen Tzu-chieh	02:37
6.	"風景"	Huang Yu-siang, Wen Tzu-chieh	01:31
7.	"帶著夢想的女孩"	Huang Yu-siang, Wen Tzu-chieh	00:33
8.	"淚如雨下"	Huang Yu-siang, Wen Tzu-chieh	01:15
9.	"Super Music"	Huang Yu-siang, Wen Tzu-chieh	02:20
10.	"我想跳舞"	Huang Yu-siang, Wen Tzu-chieh	03:12
11.	"調色盤"	Lala Hsu	03:58
12.	"家"	Huang Yu-siang, Wen Tzu-chieh	01:27
13.	"跳舞的女孩"	Huang Yu-siang, Wen Tzu-chieh	01:56
14.	"面貌"	Huang Yu-siang, Wen Tzu-chieh	01:52
15.	"給裕翔"	Huang Yu-siang, Wen Tzu-chieh	00:23
16.	"很靠近海"	Tanya Chua	04:19
17.	"那妳應該試試看啊"	Huang Yu-siang, Wen Tzu-chieh	01:20
18.	"絕地大反攻"	Huang Yu-siang, Wen Tzu-chieh	02:02
19.	"逆光飛翔"	Huang Yu-siang, Wen Tzu-chieh	03:44
20.	"X"	SM Band	03:28

== Awards and nominations ==
Award ceremony	Category	Recipients	Result
7th Asian Film Awards	Best Newcomer	Huang Yu-siang	Nominated
17th Busan International Film Festival	KNN Audience Award	Touch of the Light	Won
13th Chinese Film Media Awards	Grand Prix	Touch of the Light	Won
13th Chinese Film Media Awards	Best Actress	Sandrine Pinna	Nominated
13th Chinese Film Media Awards	Best Supporting Actress	Lee Lieh	Won
49th Golden Horse Awards	FIPRESCI Prize	Touch of the Light	Won
49th Golden Horse Awards	Best New Director	Chang Jung-chi	Won
49th Golden Horse Awards	Best Leading Actress	Sandrine Pinna	Nominated
49th Golden Horse Awards	Taiwanese Filmmaker of the Year	Huang Yu-siang	Won
29th Golden Rooster Awards	Best Supporting Actress	Lee Lieh	Nominated
33rd Hong Kong Film Awards	Best Film from Mainland and Taiwan	Touch of the Light	Nominated
2012 Taipei Film Festival	Audience Award	Touch of the Light	Won
2012 Taipei Film Festival	Best Actress	Sandrine Pinna	Won

== See also ==
- List of submissions to the 85th Academy Awards for Best Foreign Language Film
- List of Taiwanese submissions for the Academy Award for Best Foreign Language Film
