= Black Coal, Thin Ice =

2014 Chinese film by Diao Yinan

- Film poster
- Chinese: 白日焰火
- Hanyu Pinyin: Báirì Yànhuǒ
- Directed by: Diao Yinan
- Screenplay by: Diao Yinan
- Produced by: Vivian Qu; Shen Yang; Zhang Dajun; Han Sanping; Wan Juan
- Starring: Liao Fan; Gwei Lun-mei; Wang Xuebing
- Cinematography: Dong Jinsong
- Edited by: Huang Bojun; Yang Hongyu
- Music by: Wen Zi
- Production companies: Omnijoi Studios; Boneyard Entertainment China; China Film Group Corporation
- Release dates: 12 February 2014 (Berlin IFF); 21 March 2014 (China)
- Running time: 106 minutes
- Country: China
- Language: Mandarin
- Box office: US$16.8 million

Black Coal, Thin Ice (Chinese: 白日焰火; pinyin: Báirì Yànhuǒ; lit. 'Daylight Fireworks') is a 2014 Chinese thriller film written and directed by Diao Yinan, and produced by Vivian Qu. The film won the Golden Bear award at the 64th Berlin International Film Festival.

== Plot ==
In 1999, dismembered body parts are found scattered across various coal factories in Heilongjiang Province; the victim is identified as one Liang Zhijun from an ID card found at one of the scenes. Recently divorced detective Zhang Zili is assigned to the case; his investigation leads him to Liu Fayin, a coal truck driver. The police track Liu and his brother to a beauty salon, but they botch the operation, resulting in the deaths of several policemen and the suspects, with Zhang himself being shot, effectively killing the case.

Five years later, Zhang has quit the force and become an alcoholic. Encountering his former partner Xiao Wang on a stakeout, Zhang is told that two similar murders have occurred since the first - with both victims found wearing ice skates, and were romantically linked to Liang's widow Wu Zhizhen, a dry cleaners worker. Zhang himself enters the dry cleaners and hands over his clothes to Wu. He learns from owner Rong Rong that Wu had once damaged an expensive leather coat, with the owner returning to demand compensation for a week before he inexplicably stopped coming. Wu is aware of Zhang tailing her and demands that he stop, but he continues to follow her.

At one such stakeout, Zhang's bike is tampered with by an unknown person. Rong Rong is revealed to be sexually assaulting Wu. Zhang sees Wu with an injury caused by Rong Rong and offers her medicine; he also kicks an unruly customer out of the store. He invites Wu on an ice skating date, which she accepts. At the ice rink, Wu skates away into a remote area, followed by Zhang, who knocks her down and kisses her. Meanwhile, an undercover Wang notices a truck following the two. Wang confronts the driver, who wears a pair of ice skates around his neck, and is cut down.

Zhang discovers a registration plate number Wang had supposedly written down, leading to him boarding a bus, before noticing the skate-slinging truck driver following him. He lures the driver into a crowded nightclub, forcing him to abort his pursuit. Zhang picks up the driver's trail the next day, discovering his employment as an ice delivery man, which he exploits to hide Wang's dismembered remains in ice blocks; Zhang then witnesses him dropping them onto a passing coal train from an overhead bridge. Zhang follows the driver to the ice rink and asks the service desk to page 'Liang Zhijun'; the driver flees upon hearing the announcement. Wu is then brought in for interrogation; she confesses to Zhang that Liang had faked his death to cover up the first killing, which he committed during a robbery, and has since been killing anyone who gets close to her. Using Wu as bait, Liang shows up to meet her before the police gun him down.

Forensics policemen approach Wu, wanting to test the ashes of the first murder victim; she claims that she has scattered them in the river. Having witnessed Wu bury the ashes five years ago, Zhang approaches Rong Rong and demands the leather coat Wu damaged, which leads him to the nightclub Daylight Fireworks. The owner states that the coat belonged to her husband, and he had run away with another woman in 1999. She had reported his disappearance to the authorities a year later, only to be told that he had gone missing. Zhang invites Wu to a date at an amusement park; they ride a ferris wheel, and Zhang points out the flashing sign of Daylight Fireworks to Wu. Zhang goads Wu on; she kisses him and they have sex.

Wu is arrested the following day, where she reveals the truth - she had been unable to pay back the coat's owner and was thus blackmailed into a sexual relationship. Eventually, she killed him and Liang had disposed of his remains along with his own ID card to hide her complicity. Zhang watches as she is driven away. He heads to a dance hall where he has a breakdown, dancing wildly. The police bring Wu back to her old apartment to gather evidence. As they leave, they are interrupted by a drunk man (implied to be Zhang) setting off fireworks in broad daylight, which Wu recognizes before she is taken away.

== Cast ==
- Liao Fan as Zhang Zili
- Gwei Lun-mei as Wu Zhizhen
- Wang Xuebing as Liang Zhijun
- Wang Jingchun as Rong Rong
- Yu Ailei as captain Xiao Wang
- Ni Jingyang as Su Lijuan

== Production ==
The project started from Diao Yinan's idea to film a detective story. Diao spent eight years in total writing the screenplay; the final version that was filmed was the third draft. The film was then laid out into a detective film noir.

Liao Fan gained 44 lb (20 kg) of weight to play the film's protagonist of an alcoholic and suspended police officer.

=== Name ===
The film's English title Black Coal, Thin Ice is different from its Chinese title Bai Ri Yan Huo, which translates literally as Daylight Fireworks. Diao Yinan came across this phrase from a friend of his. Diao further clarified the meaning of "daylight fireworks" as a state of sentiment or a state of condition. For him, the Chinese and English names together helped to construct the difference between reality and fantasy. In an interview he explained, "Coal and ice both belong to the realm of reality, but fireworks in daylight is something fantastic; they are the two sides of the same coin." The English name refers to the two visual clues in the film: coal as "where the body parts were found" and ice as "where the murder was committed". He further explained, "when the two are combined, the reality of this murder is constructed ... while daytime fireworks is a fantasy, it is what we use to coat ourselves from the cruel side of this real world."

== Reception ==
=== Box office ===
Black Coal, Thin Ice grossed US$16.8 million worldwide.

=== Critical response ===
The film was shown in competition at the 64th Berlin International Film Festival, won the Golden Bear prize for Diao. The film's leading actor Liao Fan also won the Silver Bear for Best Actor. The film received critical praise at the Berlin Film Festival, but audience reaction was more divided.

On review aggregator website Rotten Tomatoes, the film has an approval rating of 96% based on 23 reviews, with an average rating of 7.82/10. On Metacritic, which assigns a normalized rating to reviews, the film has a weighted average score 75 out of 100, based on 5 critics, indicating "generally favorable reviews".
