= List of awards and nominations received by Shu Qi =

Shu Qi awards and nominations
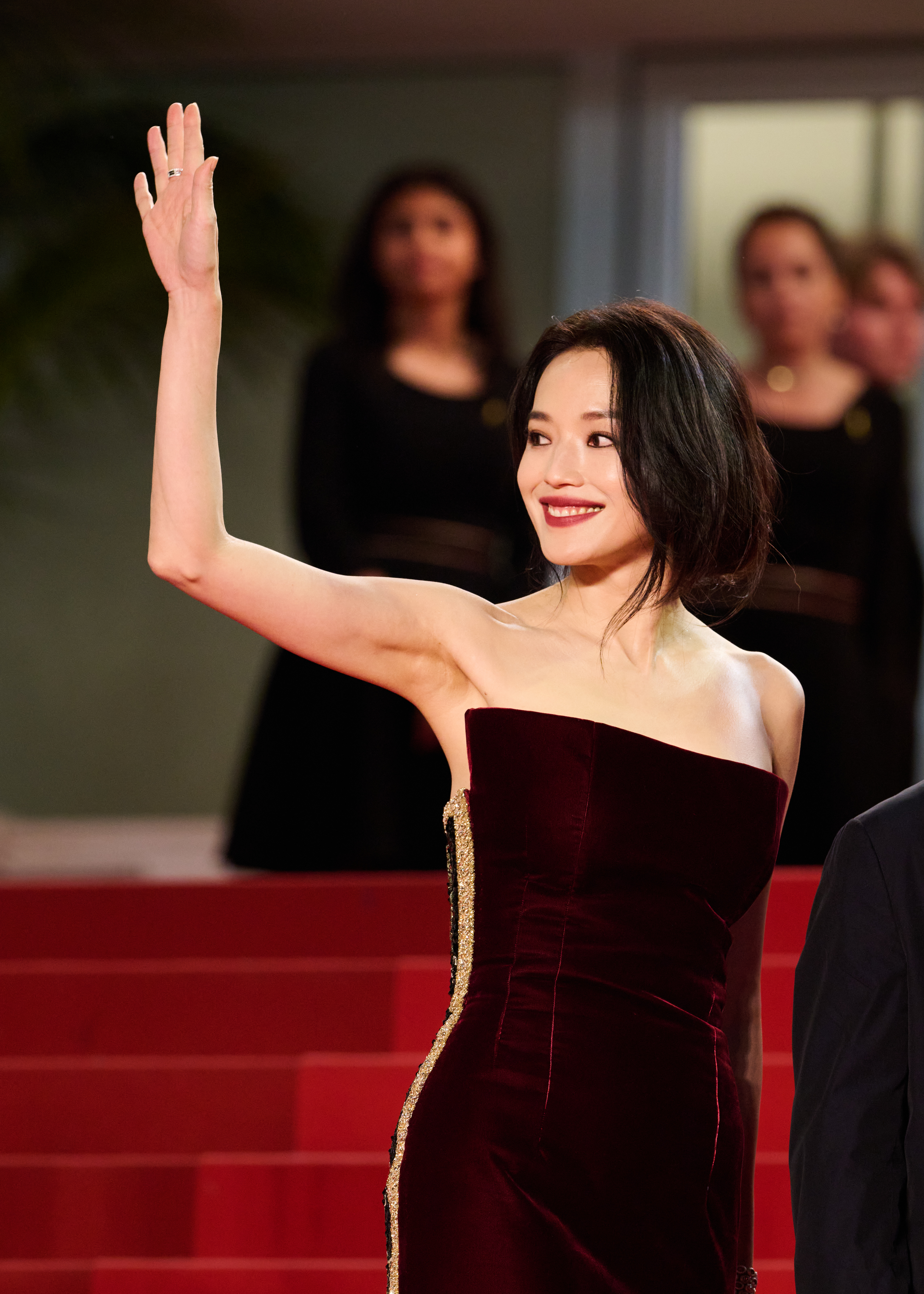
- Shu at the Cannes Film Festival in 2025
Awards and nominations
Award	Wins	Nominations
Asian Film Awards	1	1
Golden Horse Awards	2	10
Hong Kong Film Awards	4	11

This is a list of awards and nominations received by Taiwanese actress Shu Qi.

== Film awards ==
=== Asian Film Awards ===
Year	Category	Work	Result	Ref.
2016	Best Actress	The Assassin	Won	

=== Asia Pacific Screen Awards ===
Year	Category	Work	Result	Ref.
2025	Best Screenplay	Girl	Nominated	

=== Busan International Film Festival ===
Year	Category	Work	Result	Ref.
2025	Busan Award – Best Director	Girl	Won	

=== Camerimage ===
Year	Category	Work	Result	Ref.
2025	Golden Frog in the Directors' Debuts Competition	Girl	Won	

=== Changchun Film Festival ===
Year	Category	Work	Result	Ref.
2005	Best Actress	The Foliage	Nominated	
2012	Best Actress	Love	Nominated	

=== China Film Director's Guild Awards ===
Year	Category	Work	Result	Ref.
2005	Actress of the Year	The Foliage	Nominated	
2012	Actress of the Year	If You Are the One 2	Nominated	
2016	Actress of the Year	The Assassin	Nominated	
2026	Hong Kong and Taiwan Director of the Year	Girl	Won	

=== Chinese Film Media Awards ===
Year	Category	Work	Result	Ref.
2002	Best Actress	Millennium Mambo	Nominated	
2005	Best Actress	The Foliage	Nominated	
2006	Best Actress	Three Times	Nominated	

=== Golden Bauhinia Awards ===
Year	Category	Work	Result	Ref.
1997	Best Supporting Actress	Viva Erotica	Won	
1999	Best Supporting Actress	City of Glass	Won	

=== Golden Horse Awards ===
Year	Category	Work	Result	Ref.
1996	Best Supporting Actress	Viva Erotica	Nominated	
1997	Best Leading Actress	Love Is Not a Game, But a Joke	Nominated	
1998	Best Supporting Actress	Portland Street Blues	Won	
2001	Best Leading Actress	Millennium Mambo	Nominated	
2005	Best Leading Actress	Three Times	Won	
2007	Best Original Film Song	"Blood Brothers"	Nominated	
2011	Best Leading Actress	A Beautiful Life	Nominated	
2013	Best Leading Actress	Journey to the West: Conquering the Demons	Nominated	
2015	Best Leading Actress	The Assassin	Nominated	
2017	Best Leading Actress	The Village of No Return	Nominated	
2026	Best New Director	Girl	Pending	

=== Golden Rooster Awards ===
Year	Category	Work	Result	Ref.
2026	Best Directorial Debut	Girl	Pending	

=== Fantastic Fest ===
Year	Category	Work	Result	Ref.
2013	Best Actress (Comedy Features)	Journey to the West: Conquering the Demons	Won	

=== Hong Kong Film Awards ===
Year	Category	Work	Result	Ref.
1997	Best New Performer	Viva Erotica	Won	
1997	Best Supporting Actress	Viva Erotica	Won	
1998	Best Actress	Love Is Not a Game, But a Joke	Nominated	
1999	Best Supporting Actress	Portland Street Blues	Won	
1999	Best Supporting Actress	The Storm Riders	Nominated	
1999	Best Actress	City of Glass	Nominated	
2010	Best Actress	Look for a Star	Nominated	
2012	Best Actress	A Beautiful Life	Nominated	
2026	Best Director	Girl	Nominated	
2026	Best Screenplay	Girl	Nominated	
2026	Best New Director	Girl	Won	

=== Hong Kong Film Critics Society Awards ===
Year	Category	Work	Result	Ref.
2007	Best Actress	Confession of Pain	Nominated	
2012	Best Actress	A Beautiful Life	Nominated	
2014	Best Actress	Journey to the West: Conquering the Demons	Nominated	
2026	Best Screenplay	Girl	Nominated	

=== Hong Kong Film Directors' Guild Awards ===
Year	Category	Work	Result	Ref.
2026	Best New Director	Girl	Won	

=== Huabiao Awards ===
Year	Category	Work	Result	Ref.
2009	Outstanding Actress (Hong Kong/Taiwan)	If You Are the One	Won	

=== Hundred Flowers Awards ===
Year	Category	Work	Result	Ref.
2010	Best Actress	If You Are the One	Nominated	
2016	Best Actress	Mojin: The Lost Legend	Nominated	

=== Macau International Movie Festival ===
Year	Category	Work	Result	Ref.
2016	Best Actress	My Best Friend's Wedding	Nominated	

=== Shanghai Film Critics Awards ===
Year	Category	Work	Result	Ref.
2004	Best Actress	The Foliage	Won	

=== Taipei Film Awards ===
Year	Category	Work	Result	Ref.
2026	Best Feature	Girl	Nominated	
2026	Best Director	Girl	Nominated	
2026	Best Screenplay	Girl	Nominated	

=== Venice Film Festival ===
Year	Category	Work	Result	Ref.
2025	Golden Lion	Girl	Nominated	

== Miscellaneous awards ==
=== Weibo Awards ===
Year	Category	Work	Result	Ref.
2017	Entertainment Influencer of the Year	—N/a	Won	
2023	Model Actor of the Year	—N/a	Won	
