= 38th Golden Horse Awards =

Award ceremony for Chinese-language films of 2000 and 2001

- Promotional poster
- Date: December 8, 2001
- Site: Hualien Stadium, Hualien County, Taiwan
- Hosted by: Kevin Tsai and Isabel Kao
- Preshow hosts: Ho Kuan-chun and Angela Chow
- Organized by: Taipei Golden Horse Film Festival Executive Committee

Highlights
- Best Feature Film: Durian Durian
- Best Director: Stanley Kwan; Lan Yu
- Best Actor: Liu Ye; Lan Yu
- Best Actress: Qin Hailu; Durian Durian
- Most awards: Lan Yu (4); Durian Durian (4)
- Most nominations: Lan Yu (10)

Television in Taiwan
- Channel: Super TV
- Ratings: 0.95% (average)

The 38th Golden Horse Awards (Mandarin:第38屆金馬獎) took place on December 8, 2001 at the Hualien Stadium in Hualien County, Taiwan.

== Winners and nominees ==
Winners are listed first and highlighted in boldface.

**Best Feature Film**: **Durian Durian**; Beijing Bicycle; What Time Is It There?; Gimme Gimme; Lan Yu	**Best Short Film**: **Summer, Dream**; If You Love Me More; Dinner; Incidental Journey
**Best Documentary**: **Pick of the Litter - Stray Dogs in Taiwan**; Floating Iskands	**Best Animation** -
**Best Director**: **Stanley Kwan — Lan Yu**; Wang Xiaoshuai — Beijing Bicycle; Tsai Ming-liang — What Time Is It There?; Fruit Chan — Durian Durian	**Best Leading Actor**: **Liu Ye — Lan Yu**; Andy Lau — Love on a Diet; Ekin Cheng — Goodbye Mr. Cool; Hu Jun — Lan Yu
**Best Leading Actress**: **Qin Hailu — Durian Durian**; Anita Mui — Midnight Fly; Sylvia Chang — Forever and Ever; Shu Qi — Millennium Mambo	**Best Supporting Actor**: **Patrick Tam — Born Wild**; Victor Ma — The Map of Sex and Love; Simon Yam — Midnight Fly; Shin Ying — A Way We Go
**Best Supporting Actress**: **Yoky Lo — Gimme Gimme**; Risa Junna — Midnight Fly; Lu Yi-ching — What Time Is It There?; Li Show — Summer, Dream	**Best New Performer**: **Qin Hailu — Durian Durian**; Li Bin — Beijing Bicycle; Yoky Lo — Gimme Gimme; Zeny Kwok — Merry-Go-Round
**Audience Choice Award**: **Lan Yu**	**Special Jury Award**: **What Time Is It There?**
**Special Jury Award for Filmmaker**: **Tsai Ming-liang**	**Lifetime Achievement Award**: **Song Chun-so**
