= Chang Chen =

Taiwanese actor (born 1976)

- 張震
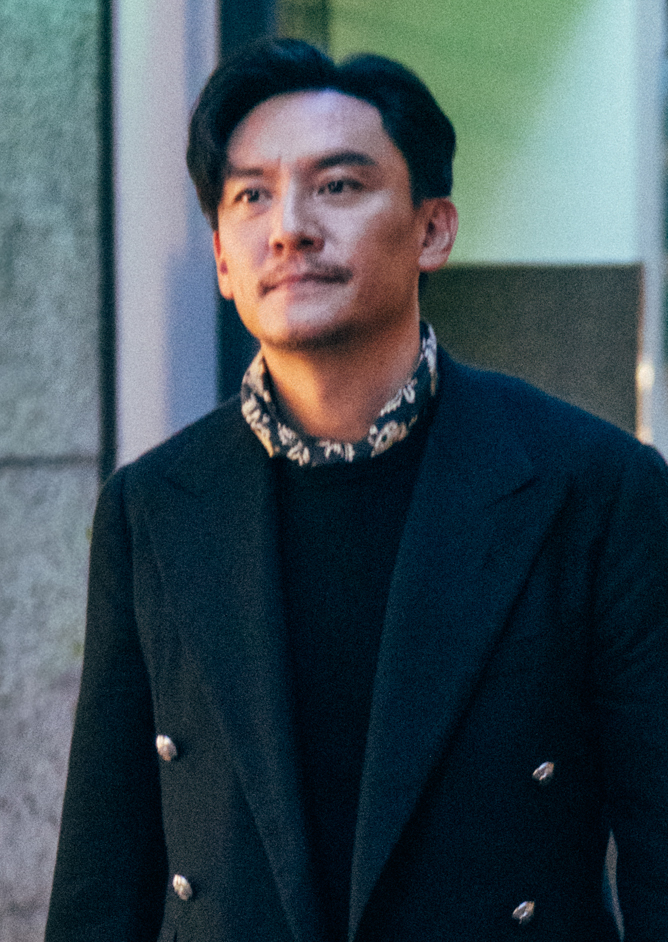
- Chang in 2026
- Born: 14 October 1976 (age 50); Taipei, Taiwan
- Occupations: Actor; singer
- Years active: 1980–present
- Spouse: Zhuang Wen Ru (m. 2013)
- Children: 1
- Parent: Chang Kuo-chu

Chinese name
- Traditional Chinese: 張震
- Simplified Chinese: 张震
- Hanyu Pinyin: Zhāng Zhèn
- Wade–Giles: Chang^{1} Chen^{4}
- IPA: [ʈʂáŋ ʈʂə̂n]
- Yale Romanization: Jeūng Jan
- Jyutping: Zoeng1 Zan3
- IPA: [tsœŋ˥ tsɐn˧]
- Hokkien POJ: Tiuⁿ Chìn

Chang Chen (born 14 October 1976) is a Taiwanese actor. He is best known for his roles in A Brighter Summer Day (1991), Happy Together (1997), Crouching Tiger, Hidden Dragon (2000), Three Times (2005), Brotherhood of Blades (2014), The Assassin (2015) and The Soul (2021). For his performance in The Soul, he won Best Leading Actor prize at the 58th Golden Horse Awards.

== Career ==
Chang started his film career at a young age. He was selected by a Taiwanese film director Edward Yang to be the protagonist of a four-hour-long critically acclaimed film A Brighter Summer Day, which won the Special Jury Prize at the Tokyo International Film Festival. After the first film, he took a part-time job at a film company and worked there for two years until he graduated from high school.

One of the earliest films Chang acted in was Wong Kar-wai's Happy Together (1997). He rose to fame for his role as "Dark Cloud" in the 2000 film Crouching Tiger, Hidden Dragon, directed by Ang Lee. He also featured in Wong Kar-wai's 2046 (2004).

Chang then co-starred with Shu Qi in Hou Hsiao-hsien's Three Times (2005), which competed for the Palme d'Or at the 2005 Cannes Film Festival and won Golden Horse accolades for Outstanding Taiwanese Film of the Year, among other awards. For his performance in that film, Chang was also nominated for Best Leading Actor at the 42nd Golden Horse Awards.

In 2006, Chang was nominated for the Golden Horse Award for Best Leading Actor for his role in The Go Master, a dramatisation of the life of the Go master Wu Qingyuan. The following year, Chang made his Korean debut in Kim Ki-duk's Breath, which competed for the Palme d'Or at the 2007 Cannes Film Festival.

Chang then starred in the historical war epic Red Cliff (2008-2009), portraying the warlord Sun Quan. He was nominated at the Hong Kong Film Awards for Best Supporting Actor. He next starred in the 2012 historical epic The Last Supper directed by Lu Chuan and the 2013 kungfu epic The Grandmaster by Wong Kar-wai.

In 2014, Chang headlined the wuxia film Brotherhood of Blades, which won commercial success and critical acclaim. He earned his third nomination for Best Actor in the Golden Horse Awards.

Chang reunited with Three Times director Hou Hsiao-hsien and co-star Shu Qi in the 2015 wuxia film The Assassin, which competed for the Palme d'Or at the Cannes Film Festival.

In 2017, Chang played the title character in the action film Mr. Long, which was selected to compete for the Golden Bear in the main competition section of the 67th Berlin International Film Festival. The same year, he returned for the second installment of Brotherhood of Blades film.

Chang served as a jury member at the 2018 Cannes Film Festival.

In 2021, Chang played Dr. Wellington Yueh in Denis Villeneuve's epic science fiction film Dune. which premiered at the 78th Venice International Film Festival. In the same year, he won Best Leading Actor at the 58th Golden Horse Awards for his performance in the mystery film The Soul, marking his first Golden Horse Award after three previous nominations without a win.

Chang served as a jury member at the 59th Golden Horse Awards in 2022.

In June 2023, Chang was invited to become a member of the Academy of Motion Picture Arts and Sciences.

== Personal life ==
Chang was born in Taipei, Taiwan. His father Chang Kuo-chu and his brother Chang Han are also actors.

In November 2013, Chang married Ann Zhuang (莊雯如), his girlfriend of four years. The couple registered their marriage on 12 November and held a wedding reception on 18 November at SPOT Cinema in Taipei. Chang and Ann welcomed their daughter, Yuan Yuan, in March 2015.

== Filmography ==
=== Film ===
Year	English title	Original title	Role	Notes	Ref.
1980	Helpless Taste	三角習題	Hsiao-chien		
1986	Dark Night	暗夜	Huang Cheng-te		
1991	A Brighter Summer Day	牯嶺街少年殺人事件	Chang Chen (Xiao Si'r)		
1996	Mahjong	麻將	Hong Kong		
1997	Happy Together	春光乍洩	Chang		
2000	Crouching Tiger, Hidden Dragon	臥虎藏龍	Lo Xiaohu		
2000	Flyin' Dance	第一次的親密接觸	Tai		
2001	Betelnut Beauty	愛你愛我	Feng		
2002	Chinese Odyssey 2002	天下無雙	Emperor Zhengde		
2003	Sound of Colors	地下鐵	Chung Cheng		
2003	Sinbad: Legend of the Seven Seas	—N/a	Sinbad	Taiwanese version, voice	
2004	2046	2046	Cc1966		
2004	Eros	愛神	Zhang	Segment: "The Hand"	
2005	Three Times	最好的時光	Chen / Mr. Chang / Zhen		
2006	Silk	詭絲	Yeh Chi-tung		
2006	The Go Master	吳清源	Wu Qingyuan		
2007	My Blueberry Nights	—N/a	Jeremy	Taiwanese version, voice	
2007	Blood Brothers	天堂口	Mark		
2007	Breath	숨	Jang Jin		
2007	Into the Faraway Sky	遠くの空に消えた	Smith	Cameo	
2008	Red Cliff	赤壁	Sun Quan		
2008	Missing	深海尋人 / 謎屍	Simon		
2008	Parking	停車 / 車位	Chen Mo		
2009	Red Cliff: Part 2	赤壁:決戰天下	Sun Quan		
2010	Here Comes Fortune	財緣萬歲	Cheng Yu		
2011	The Blue Cornflower	藍色矢車菊	William		
2011	The Founding of a Party	建黨偉業	Chiang Kai-shek		
2012	The Last Supper	王的盛宴	Han Xin		
2012	Passion Island	熱愛島	Chuell Kim		
2012	When Yesterday Comes	昨日的記憶	Chen Sheng	Segment: "Healing"	
2013	The Grandmaster	一代宗師	Yi Xian Tian / Razor		
2013	Christmas Rose	聖誕玫瑰	Winston		
2014	Brotherhood of Blades	繡春刀	Shen Lian		
2015	The Assassin	聶隱娘 / 刺客聶隱娘	Tian Ji'an		
2015	Helios	赤道	Gam Dao-nin		
2015	Monk Comes Down the Mountain	道士下山	Boss Zha		
2016	The Secret Life of Pets	—N/a	Snowball	Taiwanese version, voice	
2017	Mr. Long	ミスター・ロン/ 龍先生	Long		
2017	Brotherhood of Blades 2	繡春刀·修羅戰場	Shen Lian		
2018	Forever Young	無問西東	Zhang Guoguo		
2018	Savages	雪暴	Wang Kanghao		
2021	Dune	—N/a	Dr. Wellington Yueh		
2021	A Garden of Camellias	椿の庭	Huang	Japanese film	
2021	The Soul	缉魂	Liang Wenchao		
2024	The Embers	餘燼	Chang Chen-tze		
2025	Lucky Lu				

=== Television series ===
Year	English title	Original title	Role	Ref.
2019	Love and Destiny	三生三世宸汐缘	Jiu Chen	
2022	Narco-Saints	수리남	Chen Jin	

=== As director ===
Year	English title	Original title	Notes
2014	Three Charmed Lives	三生	segment "Inchworm"

=== Music video appearances ===
Year	Artist	Song title
1996	Zheng Zhihua	"Mahjong"
2001	Brown Eyes	"Already One Year"
2001	Brown Eyes	"Bit By Bit"
2002	DJ Shadow	"Six Days"
2020	Tarcy Su	"Eternity and A Day"

== Theater ==
Year	English title	Mandarin title
1986	The Adventures of Pinocchio	木偶奇遇記

== Discography ==
=== Albums ===
Title	Album details	Track listing
Walk Away 一走了之	Released: November 1995; Label: Forward Music; Formats: CD, digital download	Track listing: 1. 一走了之; 2. 只想讓你美麗; 3. 真相大白; 4. 下雨; 5. 無法逃避; 6. 打擾了你對不起; 7. 早熟; 8. 你 9. 箱子呢; 10. 無能為力
Chang Chen 張震就是張震	Released: July 1996; Label: Forward Music; Formats: CD, digital download	Track listing: 1. 無法逃避; 2. 下雨 (I Will Never Change My Love); 3. 箱子呢; 4. 你 5. 無法逃避(練唱版)

== Awards and nominations ==
Year	Award	Category	Nominated work	Result	Ref.
1991	Golden Horse Awards	Best Leading Actor	A Brighter Summer Day	Nominated	
1998	17th Hong Kong Film Awards	Best Supporting Actor	Happy Together	Nominated	
2001	20th Hong Kong Film Awards	Best Supporting Actor	Crouching Tiger, Hidden Dragon	Nominated	
2005	Golden Horse Awards	Best Leading Actor	Three Times	Nominated	
2007	1st Asian Film Awards	Best Actor	The Go Master	Nominated	
2008	Osaka Asian Film Festival	Best Actor	The Go Master	Won	
2010	29th Hong Kong Film Awards	Best Supporting Actor	Red Cliff: Part 2	Nominated	
2014	Golden Horse Awards	Best Leading Actor	Brotherhood of Blades	Nominated	
2018	25th Beijing College Student Film Festival	Best Actor	Brotherhood of Blades 2	Won	
2019	26th Huading Awards	Best Actor (Historical drama)	Love and Destiny	Nominated	
2019	Golden Bud - The Fourth Network Film And Television Festival	Best Actor	Love and Destiny	Nominated	
2021	23rd Taipei Film Awards	Best Actor	The Soul	Nominated	
2021	30th Huading Awards	Best Actor	The Soul	Nominated	
2021	58th Golden Horse Awards	Best Leading Actor	The Soul	Won	
2024	61st Golden Horse Awards	Best Leading Actor	The Embers	Nominated	
2025	62nd Golden Horse Awards	Best Leading Actor	Lucky Lu	Won	
2026	41st Independent Spirit Awards	Best Lead Performance	Lucky Lu	Nominated	
