= Girl (2025 film) =

2025 film by Shu Qi

- International promotional poster

Chinese name
- Simplified Chinese: 女孩
Transcriptions
Standard Mandarin
- Hanyu Pinyin: Nǚhái
- Directed by: Shu Qi
- Written by: Shu Qi
- Produced by: Yeh Jufeng
- Starring: Lai Yu-Fei; Lin Pin-Tung; Roy Chiu; 9m88; Bai Xiao-Ying; Esther Liu; Chen Chu-sheng
- Cinematography: Yu Jing-pin
- Edited by: William Chang
- Music by: Lim Giong
- Production companies: Aranya Pictures; CMC Entertainment; J.Q. Pictures; Mandarin Vision
- Release dates: 4 September 2025 (Venice); 31 October 2025 (Taiwan)
- Running time: 125 minutes
- Countries: Taiwan; China
- Languages: Mandarin; Taiwanese

Girl (Chinese: 女孩, romanized: Nǚhái) is a 2025 coming-of-age drama film written and directed by Shu Qi (in her feature directorial debut), and partly based on her own childhood. Set in the late 1980s, it follows an introverted girl trying to escape her painful past.

The film had its world premiere in the main competition of the 82nd Venice International Film Festival on 4 September 2025, where it was nominated for the Golden Lion. It was theatrically released in Taiwan on 31 October.

== Plot ==
1988, in Taiwan, Hsiao-lee grows up in a joyless environment. She leads a quiet and withdrawn life. This changes one day when she meets Li-li. The child, who is around the same age as Hsiao-lee, inspires her with her lively and carefree nature.

As Hsiao-lee's world begins to open up, her mother Chuan's past reappears and she tries to find her way between her family legacy and her desire for a free life.

== Cast ==
- Bai Xiao-Ying as Lin Hsiao-lee
- Lai Yu-Fei as Little sister
- Lin Pin-Tung as Li-li
- Roy Chiu as Father
- 9m88 as Ajuan
- Esther Liu
- Chen Chu-sheng

== Production ==
Girl is the feature film debut of Taiwanese actress Shu Qi, who is considered one of the country's biggest stars. After 30 years in the film industry, she was encouraged to undertake film-making after she served on the jury of the 80th Venice International Film Festival in 2023, where she enjoyed films made by new directors. She also cited Taiwanese filmmaker Hou Hsiao-hsien as a major influence on Girl; Hou cast Shu Qi in leading roles in his films Millennium Mambo (2001), Three Times (2005) and The Assassin (2015). She has said that Girl would never have been made if not for Hou.

In addition to the two child actresses, Taiwanese actors Roy Chiu and Bai Xiao-Ying as well as singer 9m88 joined the cast of Girl. Filming ended in autumn of 2024.

The film was produced by Yeh Jufeng. The companies CMC Entertainment, Wow Momentum, J.Q. Pictures and Aranya Pictures contributed financially to the project. Mandarin Vision holds the sales rights for Asia. Paris-based Goodfellas is handling international sales outside of Asia.

== Release ==
Girl was selected to compete for the Golden Lion at the 82nd Venice International Film Festival, where it had its world premiere on 4 September 2025. It is the first time a Taiwanese production competed for the top prize in Venice since Tsai Ming-liang's Stray Dogs (2013).

It was presented at the 2025 Toronto International Film Festival on 9 September in the Centrepiece section. It also competed in the Competition section of the 30th Busan International Film Festival on September 21, 2025, for 'Busan Awards'. It was screened at the Grand Lyon Film Festival on 13 October 2025 as part of screenings of Shu Qi films, an invitee to the festival. The film will serve as the opening film at the 36th Singapore International Film Festival on 26 November 2025.

The film was released on 31 October 2025 in Taiwan.

== Reception ==
On the review aggregator website Rotten Tomatoes, 70% of 10 critics' reviews are positive.

== Accolades ==
Award	Date of ceremony	Category	Recipient(s)	Result	Ref.
Venice Film Festival	6 September 2025	Golden Lion	Shu Qi	Nominated	
Busan International Film Festival	26 September 2025	Busan Award - Best Film	Girl	Nominated	
Busan International Film Festival	26 September 2025	Busan Award - Best Director	Shu Qi	Won	
Valladolid International Film Festival	1 November 2025	Golden Spike	Girl	Nominated	
Camerimage Film Festival	22 November 2025	Golden Frog in the Directors' Debuts Competition	Shu Qi	Won	
Asia Pacific Screen Awards	27 November 2025	Best Screenplay	Shu Qi	Nominated	
Hong Kong Film Awards	19 April 2026	Best New Director	Shu Qi	Won	
Hong Kong Film Awards	19 April 2026	Best Director	Shu Qi	Nominated	
Hong Kong Film Awards	19 April 2026	Best Screenplay	Shu Qi	Nominated	
