= He-Man (film) =

- Poster for He-Man
- Directed by: Ding Sheng
- Written by: Ding Sheng
- Produced by: Zhao Haicheng; Yue Yang
- Starring: Liu Ye
- Cinematography: Ding Yu
- Edited by: Ding Sheng
- Music by: Lao Zai
- Release date: 1 April 2011 (China)
- Running time: 86 minutes
- Country: China
- Language: Mandarin

He-Man (Chinese: 硬漢２ 奉陪到底), also known as Underdog Knight 2, is a 2011 Chinese action comedy film directed by Ding Sheng. The film is a sequel to Ding Sheng's 2008 film The Underdog Knight. The plot is set in Qingdao, China where a discharged navy man Lao San (Liu Ye) is caught in the crossfire of a bank robbery. He becomes a crime-fighter for the city by working with the local police using his strong fighting techniques that he learned from his time with the navy.

== Cast ==
- Liu Ye
- Zhang Zilin
- Vincent Chiao
- Yoo Seung-jun
- Liu Hailong

== Release ==
He-Man had its premiere on March 23, 2011 in Beijing. It received a wide release on April 1, 2011. The film took in RMB7.8 million ($1.2 million) over three days on its release in China.
