= Zhang Zilin =

Chinese beauty queen and fashion model (born 1984)

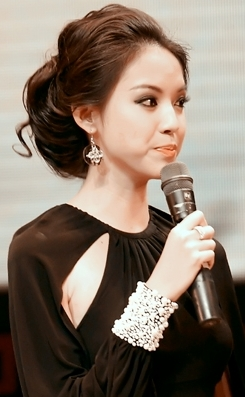
- Zhang as the Miss World winner in 2007
- Born: Zhang Zilin; March 22, 1984 (age 42); Shijiazhuang, Hebei, China
- Education: University of Science and Technology Beijing
- Height: 1.82 m (6 ft 0 in)
- Beauty pageant titleholder
- Title: Miss China 2007; Miss World 2007
- Hair color: Black
- Eye color: Brown
- Major competitions: Miss China World 2007 (Winner); Miss World 2007 (Winner) (Miss World Asia & Oceania) (Miss World Top Model)

Zhang Zilin (simplified Chinese: 张梓琳; traditional Chinese: 張梓琳; pinyin: Zhāng Zǐlín, born 22 March 1984) is a Chinese actress, singer, fashion model and beauty queen who was crowned Miss World 2007; she was previously crowned Miss China World 2007. She was the first Chinese woman to win the Miss World title.

== Biography ==
Zhang was born in Weihai, Shandong, on March 22, 1984. She then moved to Haidian District, Beijing, where she attended high school from 1996 to 2002. She later completed her studies at the University of Science and Technology Beijing and obtained a degree in business administration in 2006. Zhang is now working as a fashion model.

=== Early life ===
Having grown up in an academically oriented family, Zhang has always valued her education and has had many achievements in her studies. Both a scholar and an athlete, Zhang Zilin began training in various types of sports at the age of eight. She excels in the Triple Jump and Hurdles and has undergone professional training in the 100 meter Hurdles, having won in the 10th Beijing City Youth Games in 1999.

In 2002, Zhang finished high school and commenced her studies at the University of Science and Technology Beijing where she graduated in 2006. As an undergraduate, she competed in and won many athletic competitions. In 2005, she won the "Sports Advance Distinction Award" at her university.

=== Modeling career ===
Zhang's career in modeling and pageantry started in 2003 where she participated in a beauty pageant organized by New Silk Road Modeling Agency. As a first timer in pageantry, Zhang only managed to land herself in the top 10 due to lack of experience. However, she was later discovered by the executive manager of the agency, Lee Xiaobai. Since then Zhang has graced the runways in major fashion capitals of the world including Paris and Berlin.

In 2006, she was shortlisted as one of the top ten professional supermodels during the Chinese Fashion and Culture Awards. After that she participated in Giorgio Armani's 2007 Autumn/Winter Collection show in Paris and later earned herself the title of "Top Model of the Year" from New Silk Road modeling agency.

On December 1, 2007, she was crowned Miss World 2007 at the Crown of Beauty Theatre in Sanya, Hainan. During her reign, she traveled to over 80 cities in 20 countries. Some of these countries are the United Kingdom, the United States, Russia, Mexico, Trinidad and Tobago, Vietnam, and South Africa.

=== Film career ===
Zhang made her debut in 2011 film He-Man and 2014 Hong Kong fantasy film The Monkey King.

=== Personal life ===
In 2013, she married Nie Lei in Phuket, Thailand and in April 2016, she gave birth to a daughter.

== Music ==
Zhang lent her voice for the 2008 Summer Olympics soundtrack and also appeared in the music video for the same song entitled Beijing Welcomes You.

== Filmography ==
- He-Man (2011)
- Badges of Fury (2013)
- The Monkey King (2014)
- The Break-Up Artist (2014)
- Bugs (2014)
- Meet Miss Anxiety (2014)
- Spicy Hot in Love (2016)

Awards and achievements
Preceded by (Czech Republic) Taťána Kuchařová	Miss World; 2007	Succeeded by (Russia) Ksenia Sukhinova
Preceded by (Mexico) Yessica Ramírez	Miss World Top Model; 2007	Succeeded by (Russia) Ksenia Sukhinova
Preceded by Liu Duo	Miss China World; 2007	Succeeded by Mei Yanling
