= Sex and Zen III =

1998 Hong Kong film by Aman Chang

- DVD cover
- Traditional Chinese: 玉蒲團III官人我要
- Simplified Chinese: 玉蒲团III官人我要
- Hanyu Pinyin: Ròupútuán Sān Guān rén wǒ yào
- Jyutping: Yuk6 Pou4 Tyun4 Saam1 Gun1 Jan4 Ngo5 Jiu1
- Directed by: Aman Chang
- Written by: Lee Siu-Kei; Wong Jing; Manfred Wong
- Produced by: Wong Jing
- Cinematography: Johnny Choi Shung Fai
- Edited by: Cheung Ka-fai
- Music by: Lincoln Lo Kin
- Distributed by: Gala Film Distribution Limited
- Release date: 23 April 1998
- Running time: 99 minutes
- Country: Hong Kong
- Language: Cantonese

Sex and Zen III (Chinese: 玉蒲團III官人我要, "The Carnal Prayer Mat III - Hubby, I want it") is a 1998 Hong Kong comedy erotic film following Sex and Zen (1991) and Sex and Zen II (1996). The film is an adaptation of the Ming opera Yu Tang Chun (玉堂春) earlier adapted to cinema by King Hu as The Story of Sue San (1964).

== Synopsis ==
Three maidens of poor background during the time of Song dynasty are sold by their families to the brothel Fragrance House run by madame Tall Kau (Lowell Chik). Susan (Karen Yeung) and Chinyun (Jane Chung) become closer during their training, while the third girl, ambitious Fanny (Tung Yi) keeps her distance. Eventually, the virginity of Susan is auctioned and bought by the horse tradesman Lui Tin (Elvis Tsui) from Lin'an but Lui gives Susan to Chu Chi-Ang (Timothy Zao), a young and inexperienced scholar he has befriended at the brothel and takes Fanny instead. Susan and Chi-Ang fall in love and Fanny, although she is taken as a concubine by Lui, knowing that Susan was Lui's first choice, grows increasingly jealous of her. After Chi-Ang runs out of his fortunes and is forced to leave the brothel, Lui buys Susan from Tall Kau and brings her home as a new concubine. Now, Fanny is convinced that Lui has an unmatched affection for Susan and plots for revenge.

== Cast ==
- Karen Yeung: Susan
- Jane Chung: Chinyun
- Tung Yi: Fanny
- Lowell Chik: Tall Kau
- Timothy Zao: Chu Chi-Ang
- Elvis Tsui: Lui Tin
- Ronald Wong Ban: Wong Lin
- Lo Meng: Hung Chi

== Critical reception ==
A review at Love HK film stated: "The first two went over the top to transcend their sleazy genres - and succeeded. This one just goes about its business in an uninteresting manner and only gets sleazier when it attempts to push boundaries. The actresses lack the charisma of those from previous installments, and Zen has been reduced to only a footnote here."

A presentation of a screening of the film at the Far East film festival in 2025 wrote: "There's little sign of on-screen fatigue in this latest entry in the Category III sex-manual series which, though not quite as energetic as the first two, still comes up with plenty of excuses for furious copulation, copious disrobing and plenty of gratuitous violence."
