= Alifu, the Prince/ss =

- Theatrical release poster
- Chinese: 阿莉芙
- Hanyu Pinyin: Ā lì fú
- Hokkien POJ: Ah-nī-hû
- Directed by: Wang Yu-lin
- Written by: Wang Yu-lin; Hsu Hua-chien; Juliana Hsu; Hua Bai-rong; Chen Hui-ling
- Produced by: Gene Yao; Liu Ji-gang
- Starring: Utjung Tjakivalid
- Cinematography: Wang Pan-yun
- Edited by: Hong Dong-ren; Chang Yi-nian
- Music by: Blaire Ko
- Production company: Magnifique Creative Media Production
- Distributed by: Swallow Wings Films
- Release dates: October 26, 2017 (Tokyo); October 27, 2017 (Taiwan)
- Running time: 91 minutes
- Country: Taiwan
- Languages: Taiwanese; Mandarin; Paiwan
- Budget: NT$20 million
- Box office: NT$600,000 (Taipei)

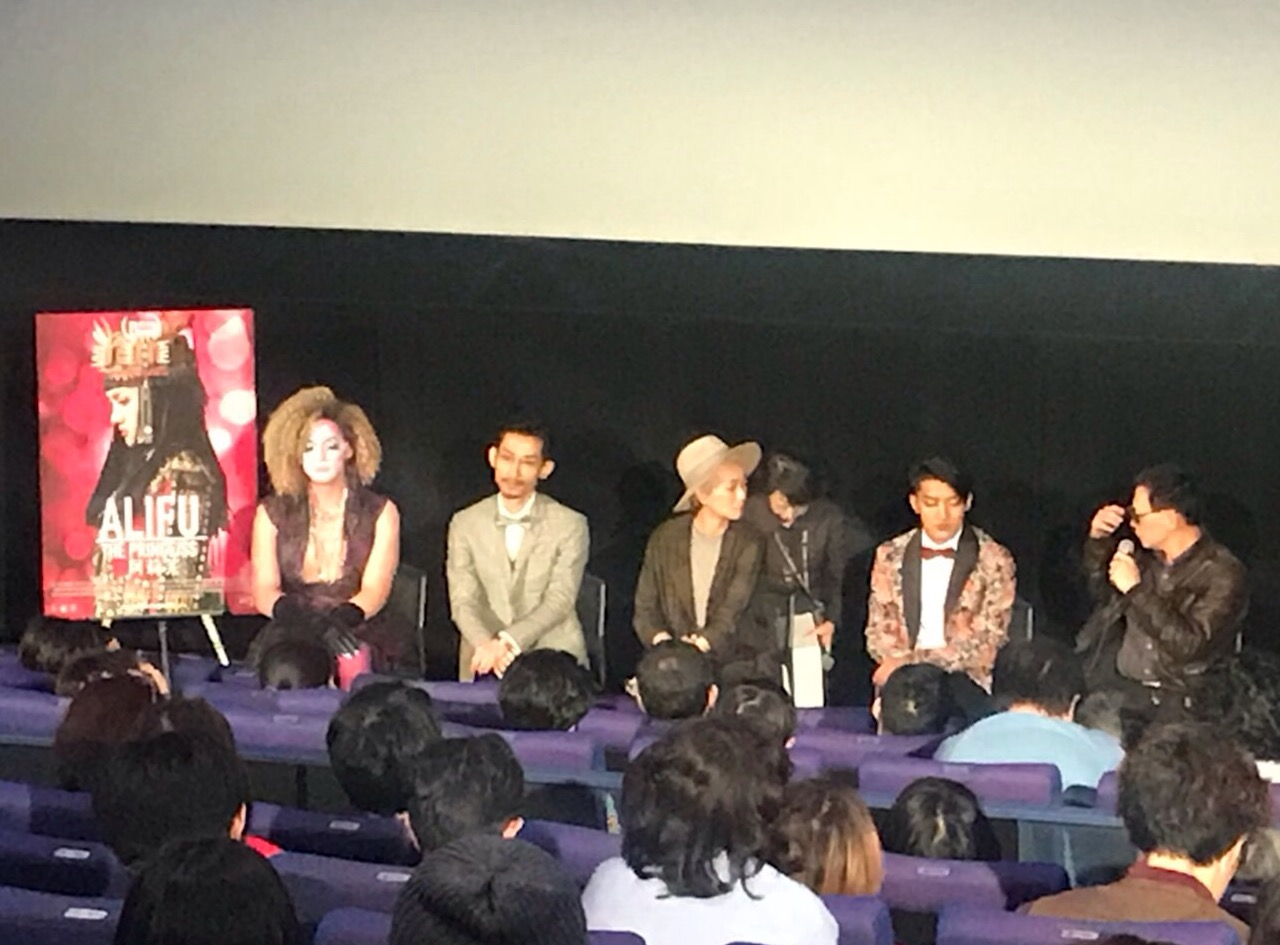
Premier interview at Tokyo International Film Festival

Alifu, the Prince/ss is a 2017 Taiwanese drama film directed by Wang Yu-lin. It premiered at the 30th Tokyo International Film Festival.

== Premise ==
In one of three stories in the film, Alifu is a 25-year-old man who works at a salon in the city. However, as the only son of the chief of the Paiwan, he is torn between realizing his dream of becoming a woman and inheriting the chief position handed down by his father.

== Cast ==
- Utjung Tjakivalid as Alifu
- Chao Yi-lan as Li Pei-zhen
- Wu Pong-fong as Wu
- Bamboo Chen as Sherry
- Cheng Jen-shuo as Chris
- Angie Wang as Angie
- Ara Kimbo as Chief Dakanao
- Matt Fleming as Jonathan

== Awards and nominations ==
Award	Category	Recipients	Result	Ref.
20th Taipei Film Awards	Best New Talent	Utjung Tjakivalid	Won	
54th Golden Horse Awards	Best Supporting Actor	Bamboo Chen	Won	
54th Golden Horse Awards	Best Original Screenplay	Wang Yu-lin, Hsu Hua-chien, Hua Bai-rong, Juliana Hsu and Chen Hui-ling	Nominated	
