= Blood Brothers (2007 Chinese film) =

2007 Taiwanese-Chinese-Hong Kong film by Alexi Tan

- Blood Brothers poster
- Directed by: Alexi Tan
- Written by: Alexi Tan; Jiang Dan; Tony Chan
- Produced by: John Woo; Terence Chang
- Starring: Daniel Wu; Liu Ye; Shu Qi; Sun Honglei; Chang Chen; Lulu Li
- Cinematography: Michel Taburiaux
- Edited by: Chen Long
- Music by: Daniel Belardinelli
- Production companies: Sil-Metropole Organisation; Lion Rock Entertainment
- Distributed by: CMC Entertainment (Taiwan); Fortissimo Films
- Release dates: August 16, 2007 (China); August 17, 2007 (Taiwan); August 23, 2007 (Hong Kong)
- Running time: 95 minutes
- Countries: Taiwan; China; Hong Kong
- Language: Mandarin
- Box office: $4,234,311

Blood Brothers (Chinese: 天堂口; pinyin: Tiān táng kǒu; lit. 'Gate of Heaven') is a 2007 drama film directed by Alexi Tan and starring Daniel Wu, Shu Qi, Sun Honglei, Liu Ye and Tony Yang. The film is co-produced by Taiwan, China, and Hong Kong.

== Plot ==
The film deals with three friends who move from the countryside to 1930s Shanghai to work with the criminal underworld. In Shanghai, the friends become involved in a dangerous love triangle.

== Cast ==
- Daniel Wu as Fung
- Liu Ye as Kang
- Tony Yang as Xiao Hu
- Shu Qi as Lulu
- Chang Chen as Mark
- Li Xiaolu as Su Zhen
- Sun Honglei as Boss Hong
- Zhao Jun
- Zhang Dianlun
- Jet Li

== Influences ==
Blood Brothers is Alexi Tan's first feature film, though Tan has referred to it as "a combination of all my collaborators' work" including costume designer Tim Yip, cinematographer Michel Taburiaux, and of course producer John Woo.

Tan has stated that he draws upon his upbringing as an overseas Chinese, such that his vision of China and Chinese society will at once be Chinese and at the same time "different.". Tan notes that his film is an attempt to combine Eastern and Western influences, in that it is his attempt to transport the style of classic westerns, in particular those of Sergio Leone and Sam Peckinpah, into the setting of 1930s Shanghai.

== Production history ==
The idea for Blood Brothers first began to gain traction when producers John Woo and Terence Chang watched Tan's Double Blade, a music video starring Taiwanese pop star Jay Chou, and contacted Tan expressing interest in producing a feature-length film with the young director. Up to this point, Tan had worked primarily as a fashion photographer. It was co-produced by the Taiwanese production company CMC Entertainment, the mainland Chinese Sil-Metropole Organisation, Terence Chang's Lion Rock Productions and Hong Kong film director John Woo, and is Woo's first time as producer of another director's film.

Once Woo and Chang were on board, however, Tan was able to seriously develop his concept for the film. Given Tan's overseas upbringing and lack of Mandarin speaking and writing ability (he was born in Manila and studied in London), the screenplay was originally written in English. As such, Tan collaborated with native Chinese writer, Jiang Dan to translate his film into natural sounding Chinese. Despite Tan's initial concerns that Jiang Dan would not understand the Leone or Peckinpah influences, he later felt that her contributions to the story helped flesh out the film's romantic elements and in particular expanded upon the feminine perspectives of Shu Qi's and Lulu Li's characters.

Shooting of the film took place entirely within China: primarily in Shanghai, and the outlying town of Zhujiajiao. The main set of the "Paradise Club" (the titular club in the Chinese title), was built in the Shanghai Film and TV Studio under the direction of Production Designer Alfred Yau.

Fight choreography, in particular the film's many gun battles, was done by Hong Kong veteran action director Philip Kwok, who was also involved in the action choreography for John Woo's 1992 Hong Kong film Hard Boiled.

== Release ==
Blood Brothers was selected to close the 64th Venice International Film Festival on September 8, 2007.

The film should not be confused with The Warlords, a 2007 Hong Kong film/Chinese starring Jet Li, Andy Lau and Takeshi Kaneshiro, that was at one point also called Blood Brothers.

=== Box office ===
Blood Brothers earned $4.23 million at the box office worldwide. In China, the film grossed RMB$12m (approximately $1.60 million) on its opening weekend. In an interview with The Hollywood Reporter, producer Terence Chang reflected on the movie's under-performance in Taiwan and Hong Kong, calling it "extremely disappointing".
