= The Underdog Knight =

- Poster for The Underdog Knight
- 硬漢
- Directed by: Ding Sheng
- Written by: Ding Sheng; Liu Tao
- Produced by: Ma Zhong-jun; Wolfgang Wilke; Wong Jing
- Starring: Liu Ye; Anthony Wong; You Yong
- Edited by: Ding Sheng
- Music by: Xiao Ke
- Production companies: Ciwen Pictures; Mega-Vision Pictures Limited
- Release date: 28 November 2008 (China)
- Running time: 95 minutes
- Country: China
- Language: Mandarin

The Underdog Knight (Chinese: 硬漢) is a 2008 Chinese action comedy film directed by Ding Sheng. It was Ding Sheng's second directorial effort, following A Storm in a Teacup (2000). A sequel, He-Man, was released in 2011.

== Plot ==
Wang-tao, known by his nickname Lao-san, is a submarine chief in the People's Liberation Army who nearly drowns while saving a drowning comrade during a training exercise. His girlfriend Daffodil remains by his side as he recovers physically, but the effects of cerebral anoxia lead to progressive mental deterioration. He is discharged from service, but continues to pursue justice as a vigilante driven by the desire to be a good citizen for the nation.

Through his friendship with Smile, the son of a museum employee, Lao-san crosses paths with a gang of thieves led by the Hong Kong criminal Dragon attempting to steal the Dragon-Tongue, a 900-year-old spear from the Song dynasty. When the two are arrested together in an unrelated incident, they become friendly cellmates. Upon their release, Dragon uses Lao-san to unknowingly help him achieve his ends. A hostage situation in the museum provides an opportunity for Lao-san to prove himself a hero.

== Cast ==
- Liu Ye as Lao-san
- Anthony Wong as Dragon
- You Yong as Captain Jiang
- Liu Yang as Cao
- Yu Rongguang as Navy Officer
- Sun Honglei
- Ellen Chan as Nancy
- Cao Hua as Wanted Man
- Yi Jiang as Xiao Hai
- Zheng Hong-tao as Smile
- Zhao Yao-dong as Mr. Wu
- Voltaire as French Collector
- Yan Jian-hua as Museum Director
- Liu Tao as Retard Convict

== Reception ==
Reviewer Kozo of lovehkfilm.com wrote, "The Underdog Knight still works as minor entertainment, though some of that entertainment is unintentionally derived from the odd nature of the production. In addition to Anthony Wong and Ellen Chan, the film also features overacting from Otto Wong of HK boy band EO2. Producer Wong Jing's 'kitchen sink' filmmaking approach can be seen in the numerous clichés (e.g., the barely-developed romantic conflict, the honorable bad guy, the friendship with the young boy). Also, as a Mainland production, the film occasionally serves up crass bits of patriotism. Ultimately, the best thing about The Underdog Knight is probably Liu Ye's intense performance as Wang Tao."

Reviewer Matthew Lee of Screen Anarchy wrote, "The Underdog Knight may not be the film that proves mainland cinema can still captivate a western audience, no reservations; it's nowhere near extrovert enough to pass for cut-rate Bruckheimer, like the flood of blockbuster action movies at the start of the Korean wave. At the same time it is definitely a big-screen matinee production, too flamboyant for arthouse purists – and yet it's frequently a captivating piece of work for all its faults. It's beautifully shot with some tremendous acting from its leads and it wants very much to be different, struggling with the restrictions surrounding its production at every turn, ending up something very distinctive, surprisingly open, even daring – a film it is debatable could ever have happened under a more conventional studio system. Far from perfect, undeniably hampered by circumstances, not for everyone, The Underdog Knight still comes highly recommended."

Reviewer Derek Elley of Variety wrote, "Though it’s a tricky sell beyond festivals and DVD, and doesn’t keep all its plates spinning at the same time, Ding Sheng’s 'The Underdog Knight' is one of the most original movies to come out of China in the past year. A genre-bending mix of psychodrama, action movie, black comedy and aspirational drama, this sophomore outing by writer-director Ding Sheng works primarily due to an utterly convinced perf by young actor Liu Ye as the wacko modern-day knight errant."

Paul Fonoroff of the South China Morning Post wrote, "Imagine Forest [sic] Gump as a sword-wielding martial artist on a mission to destroy society's wickedness, place him among the colourful German architecture of Qingdao, and you have one of the most unusual heroes to appear on the Chinese screen. Liu Ye, whose recent performances have been in marked contrast to the freshness he brought to earlier roles, finds in Underdog Knight an ideal opportunity to combine innocence and artifice. He plays a brain-damaged former PLA member, with a black-and-white view of good and evil. Produced by Wong Jing but with a mainland director and crew, the film has a slightly schizophrenic feel as it careens between character drama and action picture. In the latter half of the proceedings, the plot evolves into a museum heist masterminded by a Hong Kong gangster (well played, as always, by Anthony Wong Chau-sang) and his ruthless girlfriend (Ellen Chan Nga-lun). They make quite a Bonnie and Clyde pairing, and one almost wishes the entire picture had centred on the duo instead. There is a huge disconnect between the publicity trailer and the actual feature. The former gives precedence to the star's glistening muscles as he battles the bad guys, leaving an impression that Underdog Knight is a non-stop vigilante-style justice picture leavened with stellar eye candy. The final product is less action-packed and more introspective, factors that make it a more interesting work but may disappoint a segment of Liu's fan base."
