= Spicy Hot in Love =

- Poster
- Chinese: 爱情麻辣烫之情定终身
- Directed by: Xiao Fei; Zhang Changzheng
- Starring: Peter Ho; Qin Hao; Zhang Zilin; Zhou Yiwei
- Production companies: Xianghao Pictures; Western Movie Group; Changchun Film Group; Yantai Media Investment; Beijing Weiying Shidai Technology; Beijing Dragon Century Media
- Distributed by: Jiangsu Anshi Yingna Movie Distribution; Beijing Anshi Yingna Entertainment; Digital Film Of China Film Group Corporation
- Release date: 8 March 2016
- Running time: 98 minutes
- Country: China
- Language: Chinese
- Box office: CN¥9.8 million

Spicy Hot in Love (Chinese: 爱情麻辣烫之情定终身) is a 2016 Chinese romance film directed by Xiao Fei and Zhang Changzheng. It was released in China on 8 March 2016.

== Plot ==
The film consists of three stories that happened in three cities.

Li Xiaoyang, Liu Jiayi, and Gao Donghua were classmates who lived in the same dormitory in college. Chen Xin was their junior. Ten years after graduation, Li Xiaoyang had always played the role of a male best friend to Chen Xin. Every time Chen Xin quarreled with her boyfriend, she would go to Li Xiaoyang.

In Hangzhou, Liu Jiayi and Yang Fei, who are tour guides, were preparing to get married until Liu Jiayi got a job as a tour guide for Deng Yuqi who came to Hangzhou for a visit. After a few days of getting along, he had a new understanding of marriage.

In Chongqing, Gao Donghua runs a photo studio and has been married to Tian Xiaoya for seven years. He often cheated and thought he had not been discovered until one day he discovered Tian Xiaoya's secret and learned that his friend Li Xiaoyang had cancer. Everything was broken on this day and he began to reflect on himself.

== Cast ==
- Peter Ho
- Qin Hao
- Zhang Zilin Zhou Yiwei
- Zhou Yiwei
- Tian Yuan
- Huang Acan
- Zhang Xinyi
- Hai Yitian
- Ady An
- Jin Zhiwen
- Jack Kao
- Liu Xin
- Lee Hyun Zhen

== Reception ==
The film has grossed CN¥9.8 million in China.
