= 42nd Golden Horse Awards =

Award ceremony for Chinese-language films of 2004 and 2005

- Promotional poster
- Date: November 13, 2005
- Site: Keelung Cultural Center, Keelung, Taiwan
- Hosted by: Woo Gwa and Patty Hou
- Preshow hosts: Mickey Huang, Coco Chiang and Jerry Huang
- Organized by: Taipei Golden Horse Film Festival Executive Committee

Highlights
- Best Feature Film: Kung Fu Hustle
- Best Director: Stephen Chow; Kung Fu Hustle
- Best Actor: Aaron Kwok; Divergence
- Best Actress: Shu Qi; Three Times
- Most awards: Kung Fu Hustle (5)
- Most nominations: Election (11)

Television in Taiwan
- Channel: Azio TV
- Ratings: 3.79% (average)

The 42nd Golden Horse Awards (Mandarin:第42屆金馬獎) took place on November 13, 2005 at the Keelung Cultural Center in Keelung, Taiwan.

== Winners and nominees ==
Winners are listed first and highlighted in boldface.

**Best Feature Film**: **Kung Fu Hustle**; A World Without Thieves; The Wayward Cloud; Election; Three Times	**Best Short Film**: **How's Life**; The Pain of Others; Eros - The Hand
**Best Documentary**: **Jump! Boys**; Taiwan Black Movies	**Best Animation Feature**: **The Fire Ball**; DragonBlade: The Legend of Lang; Ven. Yin Shun
**Best Director**: **Stephen Chow — Kung Fu Hustle**; Tsai Ming-liang — The Wayward Cloud; Hou Hsiao-hsien — Three Times; Johnnie To — Election	**Best Leading Actor**: **Aaron Kwok — Divergence**; Tony Leung Ka-fai — Election; Chang Chen — Three Times; Chen Kun — A West Lake Moment
**Best Leading Actress**: **Shu Qi — Three Times**; Miriam Yeung — Drink-Drank-Drunk; Chen Shiang-chyi — The Wayward Cloud; Michelle Krusiec — Saving Face	**Best Supporting Actor**: **Anthony Wong — Initial D**; Alex Fong — Drink-Drank-Drunk; Wong Tin-lam — Election; Yuen Wah — Kung Fu Hustle
**Best Supporting Actress**: **Yuen Qiu — Kung Fu Hustle**; Teresa Mo — 2 Young; Hsiao Shu-shen — Love's Lone Flower; Lu Yi-ching — Blue Cha Cha	**Best New Performer**: **Jay Chou — Initial D**; Isabella Leong — Bug Me Not!; Race Wong — Ab-normal Beauty; Megan Lai — How's Life
**Audience Choice Award**: **Saving Face**	**Outstanding Taiwanese Film of the Year**: **Three Times**
**Outstanding Taiwanese Filmmaker of the Year**: **Hou Hsiao-hsien**	**Lifetime Achievement Award**: **Ko Hsiang-ting**
