= Three Charmed Lives =

2014 Hong Kong film by Francis Ng, Jung Woo-sung and Chang Chen

- Release date: 15 August 2014 (Hong Kong)
- Country: Hong Kong
- Languages: Mandarin; Cantonese; Korean

Three Charmed Lives (三生) is a 2014 Hong Kong film directed by Francis Ng, Jung Woo-sung and Chang Chen. The film entered into the 2014 Hong Kong International Film Festival. It was released in theaters on 15 August 2014.

== The Tangerine ==
Directed by Francis Ng
Oh Jin-woo depicts the story of a fugitive who is shaken by the kindness he receives from a woman he is seeing for the first time.

=== Cast ===
- Cheng Taishen
- Zhang Xinyuan

== The Killer Behind, the Old Man ==
Directed by Jung Woo-sung
Screenplay by Jung Woo-sung and Lee Yoon-jung

Jung Woo-sung directed the story of a killer who tries to reject the offer to kill his father.

=== Cast ===
- Choi Jin-ho (Andy Choi)
- Woo Sang-jeon
- Yoo In-young
- Seo Hye-won

Critics praised Jung's short The Killer Behind the Old Man as the strongest and most stylish entry. In it, a son hires an ultra-methodical hitman (played by Andy Choi) to assassinate his own father, but the killer however finds himself transfixed by the man's slow-moving and ordered life, and thus hesitates to carry through with his mission. Jung was invited to present The Killer Behind the Old Man at the 9th London Korean Film Festival in November 2014.

== Inchworm ==
Directed by Chang Chen

Zhang Chen tells the story of a man who becomes obsessed with video games after losing his job.

=== Cast ===
- Stone (Shih Chin-hang)
- Wang Hsin-yuan
