= Bamboo Chen =

Taiwanese actor, acting coach and producer

- 陳竹昇
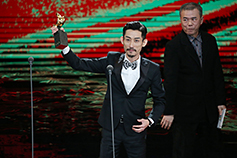
- Chen in 2017
- Born: 6 August 1975 (age 51); Xinzhuang, New Taipei, Taiwan
- Education: Xiehe High School of Industry and Commerce
- Occupations: Actor; acting coach; dialect coach; production designer; producer
- Years active: 1990—present
- Children: 2

Chinese name
- Traditional Chinese: 陳竹昇
- Simplified Chinese: 陈竹升
Transcriptions
Standard Mandarin
- Hanyu Pinyin: Chén Zhúshēng
Yue: Cantonese
- Jyutping: Can4 Zuk1 Sing1
Southern Min
- Hokkien POJ: Tân Tek-seng
- Musical career
- Also known as: Chen Zhusheng

Bamboo Chen Chu-sheng (Chinese: 陳竹昇; pinyin: Chén Zhúshēng; Pe̍h-ōe-jī: Tân Tek-seng; born 6 August 1975) is a Taiwanese actor, acting coach and producer. He is best known for his roles in Zone Pro Site (2013), The Great Buddha+ and Alifu, the Prince/ss (both 2017).

== Personal life ==
Chen is married with 2 daughters.

== Filmography ==
=== As actor ===
==== Film ====
Year	English title	Original title	Role	Notes
2007	Island Etude	練習曲		
2008	Orz Boyz!	囧男孩	Swindler #2	
2010	Rubbish Fish	垃圾魚	A-yung	Television
2009	My Life Book	生命紀念冊	Hsin-hung	Television
2010	Monga	艋舺	Geta's assistant	
2010	The Blackout Village	下落村的來電	Smoker	Television
2011	Night Market Hero	雞排英雄	Repairman	Cameo
2011	Jump Ashin!	翻滾吧！阿信	Mad cow	
2011	Face To You	面交男	Hsiung	Television
2012	The Gaya Affair	神仙谷事件	Chao Wen-chia	Television
2012	My Little Honey Moon	野蓮香	Hsiao Tien-fu	Television
2013	76 Pages of Secret	76頁的秘密		Short film
2013	Zone Pro Site	總舖師	Debt collector A / Stooge A	
2014	B-8F	B棟8樓	Chiang Che-han	Television
2014	Twa-Tiu-Tiann	大稻埕	Ching Shui	
2014	Kano	Kano	Farmer	
2014	The Great Buddha	大佛	Belly Button	Short film
2014	The Crossing	太平輪：亂世浮生	Keelung neighbor	
2015	That Happy Time	一個角落	Chang Tieh-nan	
2015	My Mother	後來		Short film
2016	Ace Of Sales	銷售奇姬	Unhappy customer	Cameo
2016	My Egg Boy	我的蛋男情人	Deliveryman	Cameo
2016	Temptations from the Doll	不倒翁的誘惑	Homeless Man	Short film
2017	The Village of No Return	健忘村	Red Cloud	
2017	All Because of Love	痴情男子漢	Man-li's father	Cameo
2017	The Great Buddha +	大佛普拉斯	Belly Button	
2017	Alifu, the Prince/ss	阿莉芙	Sherry	
2017	Angels Wear White	嘉年華	Motel Manager	Cameo
2018	Back to the Good Times			
2019	A Fool in Love, Love Like a Fool			
2022	Salute	我心我行		Special appearance
2025	Girl	女孩		

==== Television series ====
Year	English title	Original title	Role	Notes
2008	Police et vous	波麗士大人	Lin Li-hsiang (Tang Tang)	
2010	Days We Stared at the Sun	他們在畢業的前一天爆炸	Tsai Chih-liang	
2012	Guang Ming Heng Sheng	光明恆生	A-chieh	
2012	Love in the Wind	你是春風我是雨	Mr. Ting	
2012	Garden Of Life	生命花園	A-yi	
2012	An Innocent Mistake	罪美麗	A-di	
2014	Apple in Your Eye	妹妹	Chou Chi-ju's fiancé	
2015	Reading Time	閱讀時光-後來		
2015	Baby Daddy	長不大的爸爸	Bearded man	Cameo
2015	Back to 1989	1989一念間	General Manager Tien	Cameo
2016	Mysterious Equation	我家的方程式	Hsu Chin-shun	
2017	Days We Stared at the Sun II	他們在畢業的前一天爆炸2	Tsai Chih-liang	
2017	We Are All Family	我綿一家人	Tang Feng-cheng	Cameo

=== As production crew ===
Year	English title	Original title	Role	Notes
2008	Her Story	女．性	Producer	Short film
2008	The Taste of Orange Paste	桔醬的滋味	Art designer	Television series
2010	Monga	艋舺	Acting and dialect coach	Film
2011	Night Market Hero	雞排英雄	Acting and dialect coach	Film
2011	Jump Ashin!	翻滾吧！阿信	Acting coach	Film
2014	Apple in Your Eye	妹妹	Producer	Television series
2014	The Great Buddha	大佛	Acting coach	Short film
2014	The Crossing	太平輪：亂世浮生	Dialect coach	Film
2015	The Laundryman	青田街一號	Dialect coach	Film

== Theater ==
Year	English title	Original title
2000	What's A Life!?	黑道害我真命苦
2001	Human Condition	人間條件-滿足心中缺憾的幸福快感
2003	Wedding Memories	女兒紅
2007	Of Mice & Men	人鼠之間
2007	Human Condition 3	人間條件3-台北上午零時
2017	Ching Ming Season	清明時節

== Awards and nominations ==
Year	Award	Category	Nominated work	Result
2008	43rd Golden Bell Awards	Best Art Direction	The Taste of Orange Paste	Nominated
2012	47th Golden Bell Awards	Best Actor in a Miniseries or Television Film	My Little Honey Moon	Won
2017	54th Golden Horse Awards	Best Supporting Actor	Alifu, the Prince/ss	Won
