= Keelung Cultural Center =

Cultural center in Zhongzheng, Keelung, Taiwan

- 基隆文化中心
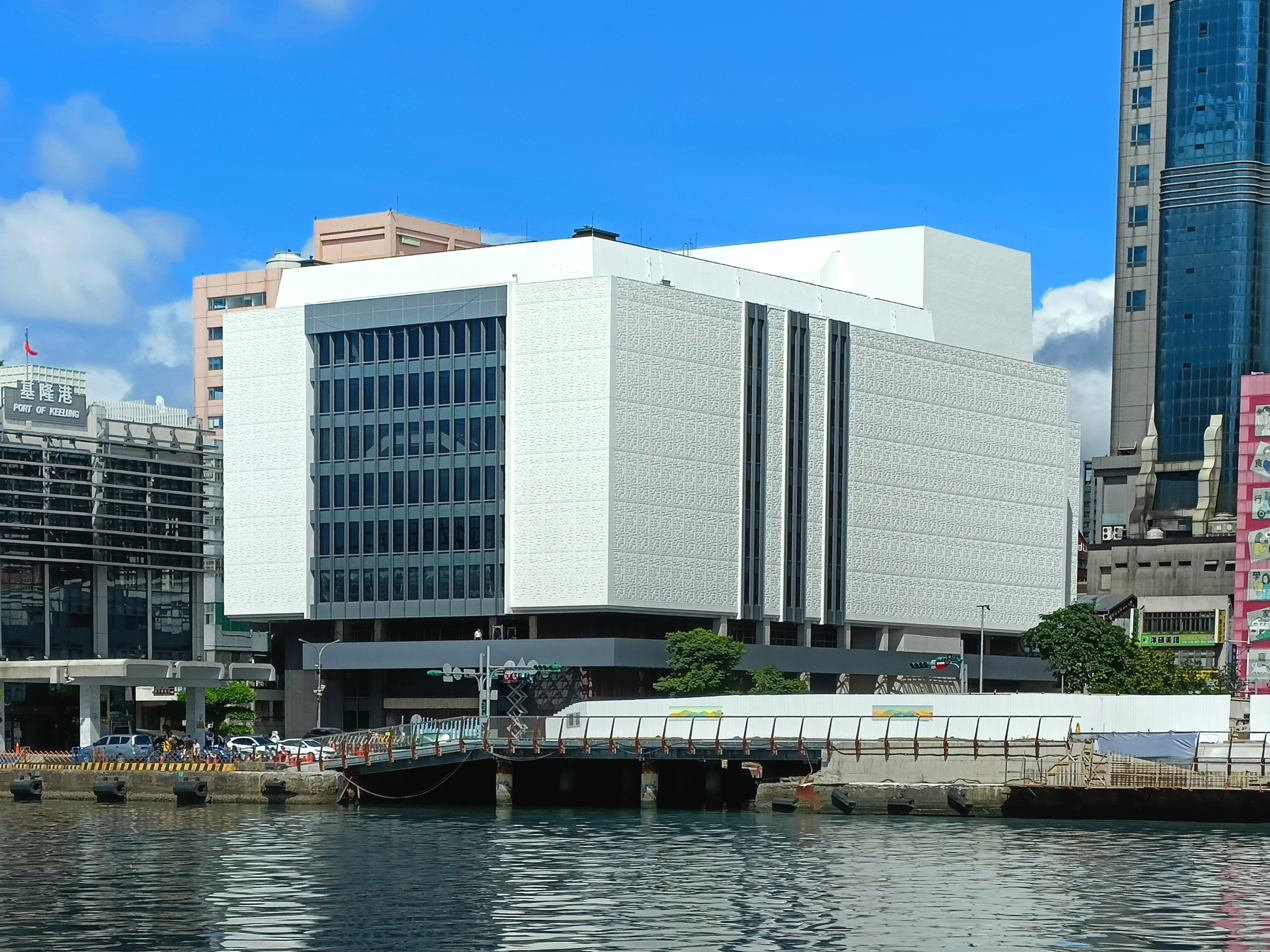
- Interactive map of Keelung Cultural Center
- Location: Zhongzheng, Keelung, Taiwan
- Coordinates: 25°07′52.4″N 121°44′38.3″E
- Owner: Cultural Affairs Bureau of Keelung City Government
- Type: cultural center
- Public transit: Keelung Station

Construction
- Opened: 27 August 1985

The Keelung Cultural Center (Chinese: 基隆文化中心; pinyin: Jīlóng Wénhuà Zhōngxīn) is a cultural center in Zhongzheng District, Keelung, Taiwan.

== History ==
The cultural center was inaugurated on 27 August 1985 as the Keelung City Cultural Center. On 1 December 2004, the cultural center was renamed as Keelung Cultural Center.

== Architecture ==
The building is an 11-story multipurpose building which consists of museum, performance hall, library and other facilities. It also houses the Cultural Affairs Bureau office of the Keelung City Government.

== Notable events ==
- 42nd Golden Horse Awards

== Transportation ==
The cultural center is accessible within walking distance east from Keelung Station of Taiwan Railway.

== See also ==
- List of tourist attractions in Taiwan
