= Liu Ye (actor) =

Chinese actor

- 刘烨
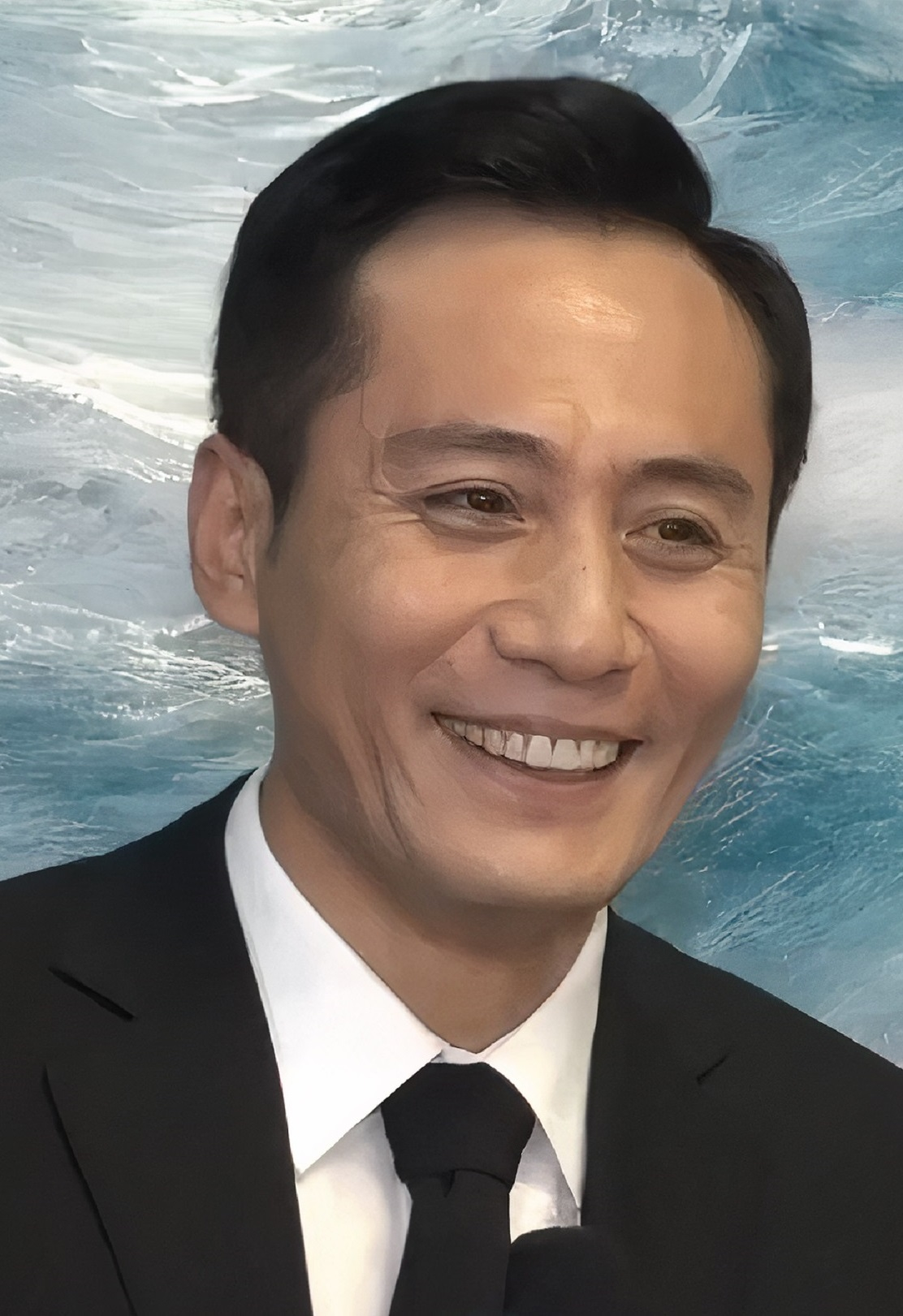
- Liu in 2021
- Born: March 23, 1978 (age 48); Changchun, Jilin, China
- Education: Central Academy of Drama
- Occupation: Actor
- Years active: 1997–present
- Agent: SMI Corporation
- Spouse: Anais Martane (m. 2009)
- Children: 2
- Awards: Golden Horse Award for Best Leading Actor (2001); Golden Rooster Award for Best Actor (2004); Golden Goblet Award for Best Actor (2016)

Chinese name
- Simplified Chinese: 刘烨
- Traditional Chinese: 劉燁
Transcriptions
Standard Mandarin
- Hanyu Pinyin: liú yè

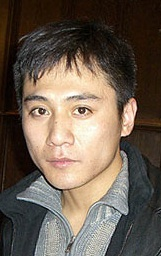
Liu in 2007

Liu Ye (Chinese: 刘烨; pinyin: Líu Yè, born 23 March 1978) is a Chinese actor. He made his feature film debut in Postmen in the Mountains (1999), and rose to fame for his role in Lan Yu (2001), which earned him a Golden Horse Award for Best Leading Actor. His other notable works include the film Cock and Bull (2016), as well as the television series Blood Color Romance (2005) and All Quiet in Peking (2014).

He was ranked 78th on Forbes China Celebrity 100 list in 2013, 48th in 2014, and 89th in 2015.

== Career ==
Liu began his acting career as a student majoring in performing arts at the Central Academy of Drama in Beijing. He made his debut in Postmen in the Mountains (1999) by Huo Jianqi, which won the Best Feature Film Award at China's Golden Rooster Awards and earned Liu a nomination for Best Supporting Actor. Liu then played a young homosexual man in the film Lan Yu (2000) by Stanley Kwan, which earned him the Best Actor award at the Golden Horse Awards. Thereafter, Liu starred in many acclaimed films such as Sky Lovers (2002), which won him the Artistic Contribution Award at the Tokyo International Film Festival; Balzac and the Little Chinese Seamstress (2002), as well as the avant-garde drama film Purple Butterfly (2003), which competed in the 2003 Cannes Film Festival.

Liu's first Hollywood film Dark Matter, based on the 1991 University of Iowa shooting, was filmed in 2006. Starring opposite Meryl Streep, Liu played the role of a Chinese physics postgraduate named Liu Xing. Dark Matter won the Alfred P. Sloan Prize at the 2007 Sundance Film Festival and was released in the United States in April 2008.

Regarded by many as one of mainland's top actors, Liu has appeared on screen in versatile roles, such as a cocky young man in Stanley Kwan's The Foliage (2003), which won him the Best Actor award at the Golden Rooster Awards; a menacing snow wolf in Chen Kaige's The Promise (2005) and a scheming prince in Zhang Yimou's Curse of the Golden Flower (2006); his performance nabbed him a nomination for Best Supporting Actor at the Hong Kong Film Awards. He shed off his melancholic and weak on-screen image to play tougher and more complex roles such as a gangster in John Woo's Blood Brothers (2007) and Ding Sheng's The Underdog Knight (2008), where he played a retired and mentally ill soldier. Liu also took on his first villainous role in Connected (2008), a remake of the American film Cellular.

Liu's brooding onscreen presence came into full view with the nearly simultaneous release of Lu Chuan's tribute to the Nanjing massacre, City of Life and Death, and Yin Li's Iron Man (both in 2009). The leading man in both films, Liu plays a brave soldier in Lu's war epic and a bronzed oil worker in Yin's film about those who struggled to develop China's oil industry in the Taklamakan desert in West China, shedding off his previous screen image.

In the 2011 patriotic tribute, The Founding of a Party, it was reported that Liu was required to gain 10 kg in order to play a 30-year-old Mao Zedong, a feat he achieved by eating 20 eggs a day. After filming Andrew Lau's romantic film A Beautiful Life the same year, Liu reunited with Lu Chuan in The Last Supper (2012), a US$15-million historical epic where he plays Liu Bang.

Liu received the Order of Arts and Letters by the French government in 2013.

In 2014, Liu starred in war drama All Quiet in Peking by novelist Liu Heping. The series, based on the events of the War for Liberation in the late 1940s, earned widespread acclaim for its interesting story and historical accuracy, and was a massive success in China.

Liu won the Golden Goblet Award for Best Actor for his performance as a car mechanic who is unexpectedly involved in a murder case in the film Cock and Bull (2016), his first award in ten years.

== Other activities ==
Liu was named ambassador of the French Riviera in 2016. He has been previously appointed tourism goodwill ambassador for Israel in 2014. On April 6, 2018, Liu received an Honorary Citizen Medal from Nice, where his wife is from, for his contribution to the promotion of the French Riviera region.

== Personal life ==
Liu married French photographer Anais Martane in Beijing on July 5, 2009. Their first child, a son named Noé (Nuoyi in Chinese), was born on October 10, 2010, in France. Two years later, their daughter named Nina was born on January 22, 2012, in Beijing.

== Filmography ==
=== Film ===
Year	English title	Chinese title	Role	Ref.
1998	A Century's Dream	世纪之梦	Zhao Xiling	
1999	Postmen in the Mountains	那山、那人、那狗	Son	
2000	Team Spirit	女帅男兵	Yan Kai	
2001	Lan Yu	蓝宇	Lan Yu	
2002	Flowers Bloom	花儿怒放	Ding Tian	
2002	Sky Lovers	天上的恋人	Wang Jiakuan	
2002	Balzac and the Little Chinese Seamstress	巴尔扎克与小裁缝	Ma Jianling	
2003	The Floating Landscape	恋之风景	Lit	
2003	Purple Butterfly	紫蝴蝶	Szeto	
2003	Sudden Lover	青春爱人事件	Xiaoxie	
2003	The Foliage	美人草	Liu Simeng	
2004	Jasmine Women	茉莉花开	Xiaodu	
2005	The Ghost Inside	疑神疑鬼	Fang Cheng	
2005	The Promise	无极	Snow Wolf	
2005	Mini	米尼	Kang	
2005	Mob Sister	阿嫂传奇	Heung-tung	
2006	Curse of the Golden Flower	满城尽带黄金甲	Crown Prince Wan	
2007	Blood Brothers	天堂口	Kang	
2007	Dark Matter	暗物质	Liu Xing	
2008	The Underdog Knight	硬汉	Laosan	
2008	Connected	保持通话	Fok Tak-nang	
2009	City of Life and Death	南京！南京！	Lu Jianxiong	
2009	Iron Men	铁人	Liu Sicheng	
2009	The Founding of a Republic	建国大业	Red Army old soldier	
2010	Lan	我们天上见	Xiaoqiang	
2010	Driverless	无人驾驶	Zhixiong	
2010	Color Me Love	爱出色	Luan Yihong	
2011	He-Man	硬汉2奉陪到底	Laosan	
2011	A Beautiful Life	不再让你孤单	Fang Zhendong	
2011	The Founding of a Party	建党伟业	Mao Zedong	
2012	The Last Supper	王的盛宴	Liu Bang	
2013	The Chef, the Actor, the Scoundrel	厨子戏子痞子	Chef	
2013	Redemption	杀戒	Xiao Ligun	
2013	Police Story 2013	警察故事2013	Wu Jiang	
2014	The Boundary	全城通缉	Tang Yue	
2015	Beijing, New York	北京，纽约	Lan Yi	
2015	Saving Mr. Wu	解救吾先生	Xing Feng	
2016	Night Peacock	夜孔雀	Jian Min	
2016	Cock and Bull	追凶者也	Song Lao'er	
2016	My War	我的战争	Sun Beichuan	
2017	The Founding of an Army	建军大业	Mao Zedong	
2018	Air Strike	大轰炸	Xue Gangtou	
2021	Island Keeper	守岛人	Wang Jicai	
2022	Steel Will	钢铁意志	Zhao Tiechi	
2024	Tiger Wolf Rabbit	浴火之路	Zhao Zishan	
2025	Moon the Panda	熊猫月亮	Zhao's father	
2026	Crossing	四渡	Mao Zedong	

=== Television series ===
Year	English title	Chinese title	Role	Ref.
1998		十个女囚的自白	Sun Xi'an	
2000	Happy Street	幸福街	Xu Xiaoyang	
2002	Don't Rent a Room	有房别出租	Ding Yufei	
2002	Love & Sword	有情鸳鸯无情剑	Shao Da	
2003	How Can I Rescue My Love	拿什么拯救你，我的爱人	Long Xiaoyu	
2003	Painted Soul	画魂	Tian Shouxin	
2004	Summer's Taste	阳光下的阴影	Zhang Yi	
2004	Assassinator Jing Ke	荆轲传奇	Jing Ke	
2005	Blood Color Romance	血色浪漫	Zhong Yuemin	
2006		一针见血	Su Yan	
2006	Harmony	天和局	Min Huatang	
2006	Surrender to the Innocent Girl	向天真女生投降	Wang Qian / Wang Zhiyuan	
2008	Our Life Time	我们生活的年代	Yuan Haodong	
2009	The Epic of a Woman	一个女人的史诗	Ouyang Yu	
2010	Invisible Target	男儿本色	Zhou Chuanxiong	
2010	The Sniper	神枪手	Peng Kehu	
2013	Fire Line, Three Brothers	火線三兄弟	Tian Erlin	
2014	Red Path	红色通道	Wu Quan	
2014	All Quiet in Peking	北平无战事	Fang Meng'ao	
2018	Old Boy	老男孩	Wu Zheng	
2019	National Treasure Legendary Journey	国宝奇旅	Ren Hongyi	
2019	On the Road	在远方	Yao Yuan	

=== Variety show ===
Year	English title	Chinese title	Role	Ref.
2013	China's Got Talent	中国达人秀	Judge	
2014	Grandpa Over Flowers	花样爷爷	Cast member	
2015	Where Are We Going, Dad?	爸爸去哪儿	Cast member	
2017	The Birth of Actors	演员的诞生	Mentor	

== Awards and nominations ==
Year	Award	Category	Nominated work	Result	Ref.
1999	Golden Rooster Awards	Best Supporting Actor	Postmen in the Mountains	Nominated	
2001	Golden Horse Awards	Best Actor	Lan Yu	Won	
2002	Hong Kong Film Awards	Best Actor	Lan Yu	Nominated	
2002	Golden Bauhinia Awards	Best Actor	Lan Yu	Nominated	
2003	Top Ten China TV Arts	Best Actor	How Can I Rescue My Love	Won	
2004	Chinese Film Media Awards	Best Actor	Purple Butterfly	Nominated	
2004	Chinese Film Media Awards	Most Popular Actor (Mainland China)	Purple Butterfly	Won	
2004	Golden Rooster Awards	Best Actor	The Foliage	Won	
2005	Chinese Film Media Awards	Best Actor	The Foliage	Nominated	
2005	Changchun Film Festival	Best Actor	The Foliage	Nominated	
2005	Golden Phoenix Awards	Society Award	The Foliage	Won	
2006	Changchun Film Festival	Best Actor	Mini	Nominated	
2007	Hong Kong Film Awards	Best Supporting Actor	Curse of the Golden Flower	Nominated	
2007	Golden Bauhinia Awards	Best Supporting Actor	Curse of the Golden Flower	Nominated	
2013	Asian Film Awards	Best Actor	The Last Supper	Nominated	
2014	Chinese Film Media Awards	Most Popular Actor	The Chef, the Actor, the Scoundrel	Nominated	
2016	Macau International Movie Festival	Best Actor	My War	Nominated	
2016	Shanghai International Film Festival	Best Actor	Cock and Bull	Won	
2017	China Film Director's Guild Awards	Best Actor	Cock and Bull	Nominated	
2019	Golden Bud - The Fourth Network Film And Television Festival	Best Actor	National Treasure Legendary Journey, On The Road	Nominated	
2021	Golden Rooster Awards	Best Actor	Island Keeper	Nominated	
2021	Changchun Film Festival	Best Actor	Island Keeper	Won	
2022	Hundred Flowers Awards	Best Actor	Island Keeper	Nominated	
2023	Huabiao Awards	Outstanding Actor	Island Keeper	Won	
