= Sex and Zen II =

1996 Hong Kong film by Chin Man-kei

- Film poster
- Traditional Chinese: 玉蒲團II玉女心經
- Simplified Chinese: 玉蒲团II玉女心经
- Hanyu Pinyin: Ròupútuán Èr Yùnǚxīnjīng
- Jyutping: Yuk6 Pou4 Tyun4 Ji6 Juk6 Jyu5 Sam1 Ging1
- Directed by: Chin Man Kei
- Written by: Elvis Tsui (as "Sai Moon-Gin")
- Produced by: Wong Jing
- Starring: Loletta Lee; Shu Qi; Elvis Tsui
- Cinematography: Cheung Man Po
- Edited by: Ma Go
- Music by: Angus; Yam Lok Leng Wik
- Production companies: Golden Harvest Company; Wong Jing's Workshop Ltd.
- Distributed by: Gala Film Distribution Limited
- Release date: 9 May 1996
- Running time: 89 minutes
- Country: Hong Kong
- Language: Cantonese
- Box office: 8.58 M. HK$ (Hong Kong)

Sex and Zen II (Chinese: 玉蒲團II玉女心經, "The Carnal Prayer Mat II - Jade Maiden Heart Sutra") is a 1996 Hong Kong erotic comedy film directed by Chin Man Kei. The film is a sequel to Sex and Zen (1991), and it was followed by Sex and Zen III (1998).

== Plot ==
Sai Moon-Kin (Tsui) is a rich man who lives with his concubines and his son and a daughter named Yiau (Loletta Lee), who is raised like a boy and is ignorant of the ways of love. Because her brother is intellectually disabled, Yiau wants to be her father's heir but feels that she needs to go to school for the required education. Her desire to attend school leads her to a love affair with a lustful young scholar (Ken Lok). Only after she is equipped by a protective chastity belt, does her father let Yiau go to school, guised in drag.

Sai Moon finds his son's new wife Siu-Tsui (Shu Qi) attractive. He does not realize that she is the evil Mirage Lady, who knows "sucking" magic. Yiau and the Iron Man (Ben Ng) try to stop the Mirage Lady from harming any more people.

== Cast ==
- Loletta Lee as Yiau
- Ken Lok as Fa
- Ben Ng as Ironman
- Shu Qi as Mirage Lady/Siu-Tsui
- Elvis Tsui as Sai Moon-Kin
- Wong Yat Fei as Monk
