= Ding Sheng (filmmaker) =

Chinese film director and screenwriter

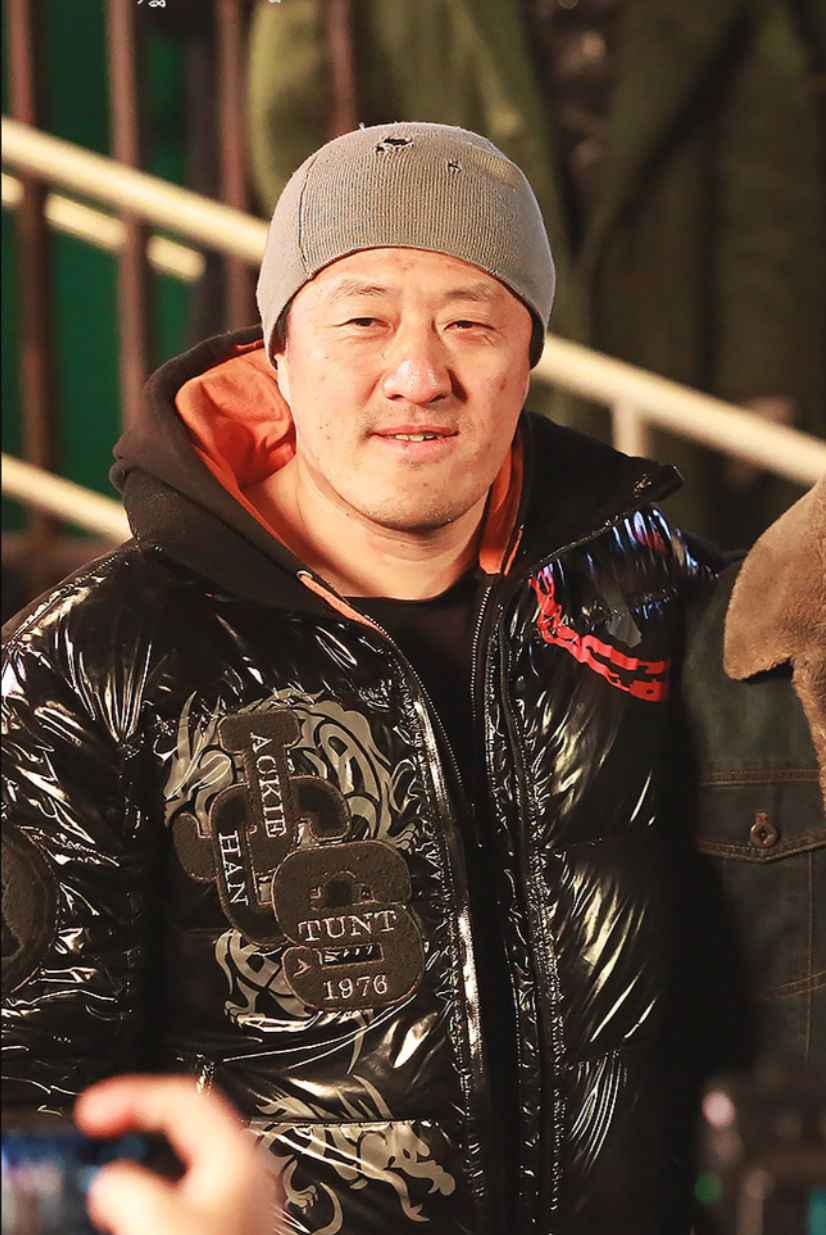
- Sheng on set of A Better Tomorrow 2018 on March 22, 2017
- Born: 1970 (age 54–55); Qingdao, Shandong, China
- Occupation(s): Film director, screenwriter, film editor

Ding Sheng (Chinese: 丁晟) is a Chinese film director and screenwriter. Born in Qingdao, Shandong in 1970, his directorial works include Little Big Soldier, Police Story 2013 and Railroad Tigers (2016), all starring Jackie Chan.

== Filmography ==
- A Storm in a Teacup (2000) (Director)
- The Underdog Knight (2008) (Director)
- Little Big Soldier (2010) (Director)
- He-Man (2011) (Director, screenwriter, editor)
- Police Story 2013 (2013) (Director, screenwriter, editor, actor)
- Saving Mr. Wu (2015) (Director)
- Railroad Tigers (2016) (Director)
- A Better Tomorrow 2018 (2018) (Director)
- S.W.A.T. (2019) (Director)
- Nothing Can't Be Undone by a HotPot (2023) (Director)
