= Lan Yu (film) =

2001 Hong Kong-Chinese film by Stanley Kwan

- Film poster
- Traditional Chinese: 藍宇
- Simplified Chinese: 蓝宇
- Hanyu Pinyin: Lán Yǔ
- Jyutping: Laam4 Jyu2
- Directed by: Stanley Kwan
- Written by: Jimmy Ngai
- Produced by: Zhang Yongning
- Starring: Hu Jun; Liu Ye; Su Jin; Li Huatong; Luo Fang; Zhang Yongning; Li Shuang; Zhao Minfen; Zhang Fan
- Cinematography: Zhang Jian; Tao Yang
- Edited by: William Chang
- Music by: Zhang Yadong
- Distributed by: Yongning Creative Workshop
- Release dates: 18 May 2001 (Cannes); 22 November 2001
- Running time: 86 minutes
- Countries: Hong Kong; China
- Language: Mandarin
- Box office: $3,847,964

Lan Yu is also the Chinese name for Orchid Island.

Lan Yu (Chinese: 蓝宇; pinyin: Lán Yǔ) is a 2001 gay-themed drama film set in Beijing. It was directed by Hong Kong director Stanley Kwan.

== Background ==
The movie is based on a novel published anonymously on the Internet in 1998. The filming itself took place in Beijing, without government permission. The movie, which was directed by Stanley Kwan, tells a romantic and tragic love story of two men. It is based on the Chinese novel 北京故事 ("Běijīng gùshì", [A] Beijing Story) by an author identified only as a 北京同志 ("Běijīng tóngzhì", [A] Beijing Comrade). "Tongzhi" is a term now often used to refer to gay and lesbian identities in China. Since this work contained positive depictions of gay men, explicit (by Chinese standards) gay sex scenes, and resurrected the ghost of Tiananmen Square, at the time, no mainland Chinese publisher would have published it, nor would the author be safe from government reprisals. Hence, its anonymous publication on the Internet. The story is set in Beijing in the late 1980s and early 1990s, and makes vivid reference to the 1989 Tiananmen Square protests and massacre. The film can be counted as a mainland-made movie as most of the crew are from mainland China. Lan Yu received a brief mainland Chinese run during the Film Association of Beijing University-sponsored "China's First Gay Film Festival" at Peking University in December 2001. Although publicity for this film festival was mainly limited to the university's website, all scheduled screenings of this film quickly sold all out.

== Plot ==
In late 1980s, Lan Yu (Liu Ye), a poor architecture student from northeast China, desperately needs money. He meets an acquaintance, Li Zheng (Li Huatong), who persuades Lan engage in prostitution. Naively, Lan agreed. He is introduced by Li to a successful businessman, Chen Handong (Hu Jun). (Li is also Chen Handong's lieutenant and one of the few people knowing of his sexual inclination.) Lan Yu is evidently smitten for he left with the older man rather than the man he was to meet. The night they spent together was not only a sexual, but also an emotional awakening, for the boy. While Lan Yu immediately fell in love with Chen Handong, the older man, who was very closeted, wanted no emotional relationship, only sex. He tried his best to avoid any attachment whatsoever with the youth, instead he showered Lan Yu with money and expensive gifts. His efforts to turn Lan Yu's love for him into a dependent, loveless relationship failed until Lan Yu discovered Chen in the middle of the seduction of a young college athlete. Crushed, Lan Yu left Chen's apartment. They would not meet again until 4 June 1989, when Chen went looking for Lan Yu, fearing for the youth's safety amid the army's Tiananmen Square crackdown. Finding Lan Yu dishevelled and distraught, the incident reunited the two and opened a new chapter in their relationship.

Although Chen Handong still could not commit totally to Lan Yu, he now gave the youth time and attention as well as money, a car, and an expensive villa in the Beijing suburbs. None of the material things were what Lan Yu really wanted although he now accepted them. Chen now lived, somewhat surreptitiously, with Lan Yu and that was all that mattered to the latter. Unfortunately, Chen Handong, being the only son of a top government bureaucrat, was under increasing pressure to marry. After a whirlwind courtship, Chen Handong married Jingping (Su Jin), a translator who helped him negotiate a successful business deal with the Russians. Upon this marriage, Lan Yu moved out of the villa (although it was in his name and legally his) and Chen Handong and he lost all contact. Shortly thereafter, Chen Handong and Jingping divorced.

A chance meeting at the airport and Lan Yu's invitation to a home-cooked meal reunited the pair. Finally, Chen Handong reciprocated the love and commitment Lan Yu had so freely given and the two were truly a couple. But, Chen Handong's company, perhaps because of the Russian deal, had aroused government suspicion. An investigation of charges of smuggling and money-laundering started. With his father dead and no longer able to protect him, Chen Handong faced a long prison term, if not execution. Lan Yu took his savings and the proceeds of the sale of his villa and all of Chen's other gifts and raised enough funds to get Chen Handong out of legal and financial trouble. Unfortunately, just as he realised that the younger man was truly his beloved and his destiny, Lan Yu is killed in a construction accident. Three years later, Chen Handong is still grief-stricken and that is how the film begins with his thinking back on the past and what might have been.

== Cast ==
- Hu Jun as Chen Handong
- Liu Ye as Lan Yu

== Critical reception ==
Lan Yu received positive reviews from critics, and won numerous awards in various movie festivals throughout Hong Kong and Taiwan, including Liu Ye's win for Best Actor at Taiwan's 38th Golden Horse Awards. It was also an official selection at many major film festivals, including the Sundance and the 2001 Cannes Film Festival. However, there has been some negative criticism. Writing in The Film Journal, editor Rick A. Curnutte Jr. admired the performances of Hu and Liu noting that they "are dynamic performers, capturing the evocative nature of the relationship beautifully, and they play-off of each other richly, allowing shared ownership of this mature, fragile love affair." However, he faulted Kwan for not exploring the end of Chen's marriage "which thematically works but doesn't give us any inclinating as to why the marriage ends, something that might have lent more poignancy to the resulting return". Finally and "most disastrous[ly], the film ends with an abrupt, overly tragic ending, seemingly punishing the two principals for their indiscretions, when the entire film coming before suggests that they have earned their love by lamenting their mistakes." Despite these flaws, Curnutte felt the film was successful in its storytelling.

== DVD ==
The film was released on DVD in 2003.

== See also ==
- List of LGBT-related films
- List of LGBT-related films by storyline
- Nudity in film (East Asian cinema since 1929)
