= The Village of No Return =

- Taiwanese theatrical release poster
- Chinese: 健忘村
- Directed by: Chen Yu-hsun
- Written by: Chen Yu-hsun; Chang Yao-sheng
- Produced by: Yeh Jufeng; Lee Lieh
- Starring: Shu Qi; Wang Qianyuan; Joseph Chang; Eric Tsang; Tony Yang
- Cinematography: Yao Hung-i
- Edited by: Cheung Ka-fai; Jerry Kao
- Music by: Owen Wang
- Production companies: Ablaze Image; Wanda Media; 1 Production Film; Mandarin Vision
- Distributed by: Warner Bros. Pictures
- Release dates: 26 January 2017 (Taiwan); 28 January 2017 (China)
- Running time: 116 minutes
- Countries: Taiwan; China
- Language: Mandarin
- Box office: NT$36.6 million (Taiwan) US$2.3 million (China)

The Village of No Return (Chinese: 健忘村) is a 2017 Taiwanese-Chinese action comedy film directed by Chen Yu-hsun, starring Shu Qi, Wang Qianyuan, Joseph Chang, Eric Tsang and Tony Yang. It was released on 26 January 2017 in Taiwan and on 28 January 2017 in China.

== Plot ==
It is an unusual day for the remote and isolated Desire Village. A mysterious Taoist priest brings a magical equipment that can erase one's memory. Since then, all the villagers have forgotten their past, living "happily ever after", while the dangerous plot behind their back is just about to be.

== Boycott ==
Chinese netizens campaigned to boycott the film, stating that director Chen Yu-Hsun was sympathetic towards the Sunflower Movement.

== Cast ==
- Shu Qi as Autumn
- Wang Qianyuan as Fortune Tien
- Joseph Chang as Master Wan
- Lin Mei-hsiu as Dark Cloud
- Eric Tsang as Rock Peeler
- Tony Yang as Dean Wang
- Ku Pao-ming as Chief
- Cheng Yu-chieh as Autumn's father
- Ying Wei-min as Villain
- Hsu Chieh-hui as Golden Lin
- Lawrence Ko as Purple Cloud
- Bamboo Chen as Red Cloud
- Chang Shao-huai as Dr. Liu
- Jag Huang as Blue Cloud

== Awards and nominations ==
Award ceremony	Category	Recipients	Result	Ref.
21st Bucheon International Fantastic Film Festival	NETPAC Award	The Village of No Return	Won	
54th Golden Horse Awards	Best Leading Actress	Shu Qi	Nominated	
54th Golden Horse Awards	Best Art Direction	Huang Mei-ching	Nominated	
54th Golden Horse Awards	Best Makeup & Costume Design	Dora Ng	Nominated	
