= The Foliage (film) =

- Film poster
- Traditional Chinese: 美人草
- Simplified Chinese: 美人草
- Hanyu Pinyin: Meǐrén Cǎo
- Directed by: Lü Yue
- Screenplay by: Huang Jingjing; Frank Shi; Wu Yin; Shi Xiaoke
- Based on: My First Love by Frank Shi
- Produced by: Liu Jing; Joe Ma
- Starring: Liu Ye; Shu Qi; Fang Bin; Qi Huan
- Cinematography: Yao Jianyun; Pan Dawei; Xie Ze
- Edited by: Zhai Ru
- Production companies: Beijing 21 Century Bona Film; Eastern Dragon Film; Wenzhou Teleplay Product Center; Xi'an Meiya Cultural Communication
- Distributed by: Bona Film Group; Mei Ah Entertainment
- Release date: 4 March 2004 (China)
- Running time: 99 minutes
- Country: China
- Language: Mandarin

The Foliage (Chinese: 美人草; pinyin: Meǐrén Cǎo), also known as Years Without Epidemic, is a 2003 Chinese romance film directed by Lü Yue and stars Liu Ye, Shu Qi, Fang Bin, and Qi Huan. The film is an adaptation of Chinese-American writer Frank Shi's novel My First Love. It tells the love story of sent-down youth Liu Simeng and Ye Xingyu. The film premiered in China in 2003.

== Plot ==
On her way back from a family visit, young female intellectual Xing-Yu meets the equally young and rebellious Si-Mong and the two fall in love. When Xing-Yu's childhood friend and lover Yuan gets into a fight with Si-Mong, Xing-Yu tries to make peace between the two jealous rivals. Her attempts for truce further draw her into a forbidden and passionate relationship instead.

== Cast ==
- Liu Ye as Liu Simeng, a sent-down youth who falls in love with Ye Xingyu.
- Shu Qi as Ye Xingyu, Yuan Dingguo's girlfriend, when she meet Liu Simeng, they fall in love. She is in a love triangle with Yuan Dingguo and Liu Simeng.
- Fang Bin as Yuan Dingguo, Ye Xingyu's boyfriend.
- Qi Huan as Wei Hong
- Li Mengnan as Manager Wu
- Zhang Jing as Lian Yun
- Li Chengyuan as the Company Commander
- Liu Yiwei as Master Cui
- Chen Chuang as Lin Shan
- He Yunqing as Supply Chief
- Fu Xiaoyuan as the Political Instructor
- Xi Yang as Shaman
- He Qichao as Goupi (child)
- Cui Jun as Goupi (grown)
- Zhang Shimin as Yuan Xiaoyu (child)
- Li Lucen as Yuan Xiaoyu (grown)
- Zhu Kaige as the Library Curator
- Yao Jianyun as the Bus Driver
- Deng Wei as the Posseman
- Lei Yongda as the Posseman
- Hu Yousheng as Manager Hu

== Production ==
Lü Yue, an Oscar Prize nominee, The Foliage was his second film since he is a photographer turned director.

This film was shot in Honghe Hani and Yi Autonomous Prefecture, Yunnan.

Shu Qi plays a village girl in a love triangle with Liu Ye and Fang Bin's characters.

Principal photography started in July 2003 and wrapped in September 2003.

== Accolades ==
Date	Award	Category	Recipient(s) and nominee(s)	Result	Notes
2004	24th Golden Rooster Awards	Best Actor	Liu Ye	Won	
2004	24th Golden Rooster Awards	Best Supporting Actress	Qi Huan	Nominated	
2004	24th Golden Rooster Awards	Best Recording	Chao Jun	Nominated	
2004	13th Shanghai Film Critics Awards	Best Actress	Shu Qi	Won	
2004	1st China Film Director's Guild Awards	Best Actress	Shu Qi	Nominated	
2005	10th Golden Phoenix Awards	Outstanding Actor	Liu Ye	Won	
2005	8th Changchun Film Festival	Best Actor	Liu Ye	Nominated	
