= A Beautiful Life (2011 film) =

2011 Chinese-Hong Kong film by Andrew Lau

- Hong Kong poster

Chinese name
- Traditional Chinese: 不再讓你孤單
- Simplified Chinese: 不再让你孤单
Transcriptions
Standard Mandarin
- Hanyu Pinyin: Bù Zaì Ràng Ní Gū Dān
Yue: Cantonese
- Jyutping: Bat1 Zoi3 Jeong6 Nei2 Gu1 Daan1
- Directed by: Andrew Lau
- Written by: Theresa Tang
- Produced by: Andrew Lau
- Starring: Shu Qi; Liu Ye; Tian Liang; Feng Danying; Sa Rina; Zhang Songwen; Gao Tian; Anthony Wong
- Cinematography: Andrew Lau; Lai Yiu-fai
- Edited by: Azrael Chung
- Music by: Chan Kwong-wing
- Production companies: Media Asia Films; Beijing Bona Film and Cultural Communication; China Film Media Asia Audio Video Distribution; Basic Pictures
- Distributed by: Media Asia Distributions
- Release dates: 13 May 2011 (China); 26 May 2011 (Hong Kong)
- Running time: 124 minutes
- Countries: China; Hong Kong
- Language: Mandarin
- Box office: $3,707,927

A Beautiful Life (simplified Chinese: 不再让你孤单; traditional Chinese: 不再讓你孤單) is a 2011 romance film directed by Andrew Lau. A Chinese-Hong Kong co-production, its cast includes Shu Qi, Liu Ye, Tian Liang, Feng Danying, Sa Rina, Zhang Songwen, Gao Tian, and Anthony Wong.

== Plot ==
A real-estate agent Li Peiru gets drunk at a karaoke bar and throws up on a lonely cop Fang Zhendong. Zhendong quickly feels a connection to the flirtatious Peiru despite the fact that she is having an affair with her married boss. The affair ends with Peiru finding out that her boss has been cheating on her.

Peiru works hard to get funding for her business idea, and when she repeatedly fails, Fang sells his house and puts up the money to fund her business. The business fails before it can even get started, and she finds herself destitute.

Meanwhile, Fang has found out that an injury is causing him to slowly lose his mental faculties. To make matters worse, Fang loses his job as a police officer after using an official vehicle for personal purposes. As she begins to recover from the loss of her business, Peiru begins to appreciate the selfless support she has received from Fang. She realizes that she has fallen in love with Zhendong, but she is unable to find him since he had moved. One day, when she has established herself in a regular job, Fang's friend comes to see her. She was told of Fang's progressively worsening condition and heads off to look for him. They meet and reconnect. He insists that she move on since he can no longer support her, but will need her support. She stays and they eventually get married.

Fang is aware that his condition is worsening over time. Eventually, he is unable to do his job and gets lost on his way home from work. Upon arriving back at home, he finds out from Peiru that she is pregnant. As Fang's condition worsens, he finds himself forgetting more every day, which makes taking care of his new child difficult and frustrating.

Fang sees a burglar coming out of a home near his, and gives chase. After a run through the back-alleys of his neighborhood, he is hit on the head with a brick and ends up in the hospital with serious head trauma. After days of keeping constant vigil by his bedside, Peiru becomes sick and passes out just as Fang's heart stops beating. They both flash-back to earlier, better times.

She awakens to Fang at her bedside apologizing for making her worry. They live happily ever after.

== Cast ==
Cast	Role
Shu Qi	Li Peiru
Liu Ye	Fang Zhengdong
Tian Liang	Fang Zhencong
Feng Danying	Xiaowan
Sa Rina	Xiaowan's mom
Zhang Songwen	Zhu Tian
Gao Tian	Guiping
Anthony Wong	Zhong
Angelina Lo	Peiru's mom
