= Viva Erotica =

1996 Hong Kong film by Derek Yee and Lo Chi-leung

- DVD Cover
- Directed by: Derek Yee; Lo Chi-Leung
- Written by: Derek Yee; Lo Chi-Leung; Ka Man
- Produced by: Catherine Hun
- Starring: Leslie Cheung; Karen Mok
- Cinematography: Jingle Ma
- Edited by: Kwong Chi-Leung
- Music by: Clarence Hui; Chiu Tsang-Hei; Duck Lau; Anthony Chue
- Distributed by: Golden Harvest
- Release date: 28 November 1996
- Running time: 99 minutes
- Country: Hong Kong
- Language: Cantonese
- Box office: HK$11,615,085

Viva Erotica (Chinese: 色情男女) is a 1996 Hong Kong erotic comedy film co-written and directed by Derek Yee and Lo Chi-Leung. The film is developed as a sex-comedy film, though with a serious subject of how an artist has to compromise his artistic integrity to make a living.

== Synopsis ==
Unsuccessful film director Kwok-wing (Leslie Cheung) has been out of work for over a year, living off of his police officer girlfriend Man-wai (Karen Mok). He struggles with his self-esteem and the shame he feels from not being able to support his family.

Finally, Kwok-wing and his producer Chung (Law Kar-ying) are able to get one of Kwok-wing's scripts financed by local mob boss Pui (Paul Chun), but there are two catches: the film must be a Category III porno and must star Pui's girlfriend Mango (Shu Qi). While he has doubts about compromising his artistic integrity in order to direct a porn film, Kwok-wing agrees with Man-wai's support.

While filming, Kwok-wing faces many hardships. Mango is uncooperative, aggressively protesting the required nudity and sex scenes, and the film is constantly in danger of going over budget. Meanwhile, Man-wai feels neglected as Kwok-wing is focused on both the filmmaking and the beautiful Mango.

Kwok-wing makes a breakthrough while directing Mango and her scene partner Wah, and filming begins to improve. As Kwok-wing's work consumes him and his fantasies of Mango grow, Man-wai declares the two of them have become "more like roommates than lovers" and leaves him. At the same time, despite their mended relationship, Mango gently makes her disinterest in his modest means clear.

On the last day of filming, a devastating fire breaks out on set. Despite a brave crew member's attempt to save the film negatives, they are significantly damaged. Pui won't give the crew additional budget to rebuild the set, and a fight breaks out between the crew and the gangsters. With a newfound solidarity, the crew works together to rebuild a set and finish the film.

Later, Chung becomes a director, crewman Dicky becomes a porn actor, Mango leaves the industry and marries, Kwok-wing and Man-wai reconcile, and Kwok-wing finds a new passion in directing porn films his way.

== Cast ==
- Leslie Cheung as Kwok-wing
- Karen Mok as Man-wai
- Shu Qi as Mango
- Law Kar-ying as Chung
- Paul Chun as Pui
- Elvis Tsui as Wah
- Allen Ting as Chi-chun
- Sean Lau as Wan Tung-sing
- Anthony Wong Chau-Sang as Wong Jing
- Peter Ngor as Kwan
- Teddy Chan as Sum
- Vincent Kok as Chiu

== Reception ==
The film, despite being rated III in Hong Kong for its sexual content, was highly praised by critics and the public alike. The film was hailed for being well-directed and woven in great artistic details.

== Awards and nominations ==
16th Hong Kong Film Awards

=== Won ===
- Best Supporting Actress (Shu Qi)
- Best New Artist (Shu Qi)

=== Nominations ===
- Best Picture
- Best Director (Derek Yee, Lo Chi-Leung)
- Best Actor (Leslie Cheung Kwok-Wing)
- Best Supporting Actor (Tsui Kam-Kong)
- Best Original Music Score (Clarence Hui Yuen, Chiu Jun-Fun, Lau Cho-Tak)
- Best Song ("Sik Ching Nam Nui", performed by Karen Mok and Jordan Chan)

47th Berlin International Film Festival

- Golden Bear (nominated)
