= My Best Friend's Wedding (2016 film) =

- Theatrical release poster
- Chinese: 我最好朋友的婚礼
- Directed by: Chen Feihong
- Based on: My Best Friend's Wedding
- Starring: Shu Qi; Feng Shaofeng; Victoria Song; Ye Qing; Rhydian Vaughan
- Production companies: China Film Group Corporation; Columbia Pictures
- Distributed by: China Film Group Corporation
- Release date: 5 August 2016
- Running time: 91 minutes
- Country: China
- Language: Mandarin

My Best Friend's Wedding is a 2016 Chinese romantic comedy film directed by Chen Feihong and starring Shu Qi, Feng Shaofeng, Victoria Song, Ye Qing, and Rhydian Vaughan. The film is a remake of the 1997 American film of the same name. It was released in China by China Film Group Corporation on 5 August 2016.

== Plot ==
A successful fashion editor, Gu Jia, realizes she has romantic feelings for her childhood best friend, Lin Ran, when he invites her to his lavish London wedding. Gu Jia is determined to win him back.

Gu Jia travels to London and she meets a man named Nick, on a flight. She later brings him to join in the pre-wedding festivities as her boyfriend in hopes of making Lin Ran jealous. Nick plays along and talks about marrying Gu Jia. Out of concern, Lin Ran takes Gu Jia aside to question why she Is moving so fast with Nick, a guy she barely knows. Nick interrupts their conversation and confesses that he and Gu Jia are pretending to date as they are aware that Lin Ran is worried about Gu Jia not having a boyfriend.

On the day of the wedding, Gu Jia confesses her feelings to Lin Ran. He chooses his fiancé, Meng Yi Xuan. Meng Yi Xuan overhears their conversation and runs away. Gu Jia and Lin Ran follow her. Gu Jia catches up to Meng Yi Xuan first and reassures her that Lin Ran is in love with her. Lin Ran catches up to Meng Yi Xuan and proposes to her. The wedding proceeds, and after the ceremony, Lin Ran hands the bride's bouquet of flowers to Gu Jia telling her that she will find her own happiness. The bride and groom drive away. Nick appears from the crowd telling Gu Jia that he is here and she smiles at him.

== Cast ==
The film cast:

- Shu Qi
- Feng Shaofeng
- Victoria Song
- Ye Qing
- Rhydian Vaughan
