= Shu Qi =

Taiwanese actress and filmmaker (born 1976)

- 舒淇
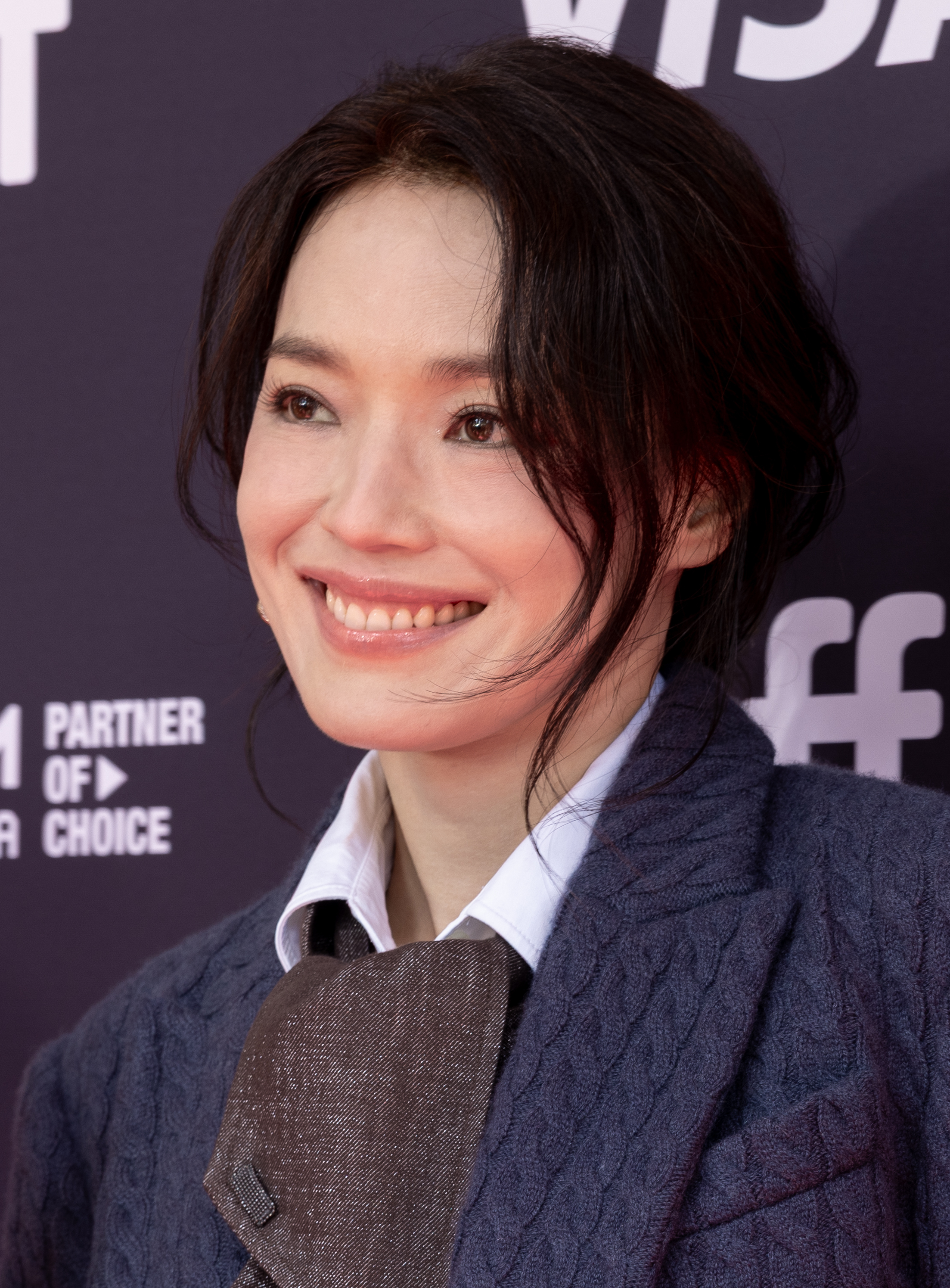
- Shu at the 2025 Toronto International Film Festival
- Born: Lin Li-hui; 16 April 1976 (age 50); Xindian, Taipei County, Taiwan
- Education: New Taipei Municipal Wu Feng Junior High School
- Occupations: Actress; filmmaker; model
- Years active: 1994–present
- Agents: Baiyu Stars; Dongshen Weilai K-Artists (2020–present)
- Spouse: Stephen Fung (m. 2016)
- Partner: Leon Lai (1997–2004)
- Awards: Full list

Chinese name
- Chinese: 舒淇
Transcriptions
Standard Mandarin
- Hanyu Pinyin: Shū Qí
Yue: Cantonese
- Jyutping: Syu^{1} Kei^{4}

Lin Li-hui
- Chinese: 林立慧
Transcriptions
Standard Mandarin
- Hanyu Pinyin: Lín Lìhuì
Southern Min
- Hokkien POJ: Lîm Li̍p-hūi

Lin Li-hui (Chinese: 林立慧), known professionally as Shu Qi (Chinese: 舒淇, born 16 April 1976), is a Taiwanese actress and filmmaker. Widely regarded as one of Asia's most successful actresses, she won four Hong Kong Film Awards, two Golden Horse Awards, an Asian Film Award, and served on the main competition jury at Berlinale, Cannes and Venice Film Festival.

Began the acting career in 1994, Shu first gained recognition in Viva Erotica (1996). Since then, she has collaborated with director Hou Hsiao-hsien on three films: Millennium Mambo (2001), Three Times (2005), and The Assassin (2015). She also starred in the film series If You Are the One (2008-2025), A Beautiful Life (2011), Journey to the West: Conquering the Demons (2013), and Gone with the Bullets (2014). She made her directorial debut with Girl (2025).

Shu ranked 18th on Forbes China Celebrity 100 list in 2013, 23rd in 2014, 32nd in 2015, 48th in 2017, and 90th in 2019.

== Early life ==
Born in Xindian township, Taipei County (now New Taipei City), Shu Qi went to Hong Kong at the age of 17 to seek a film career. She began in the softcore pornography modelling industry, appearing in the Chinese edition of Playboy. She eventually came under the management of Hong Kong film producer Manfred Wong, who signed her to several Hong Kong Category III films such as Sex and Zen II (1996).

== Career ==
=== 1996–1999: Early roles ===
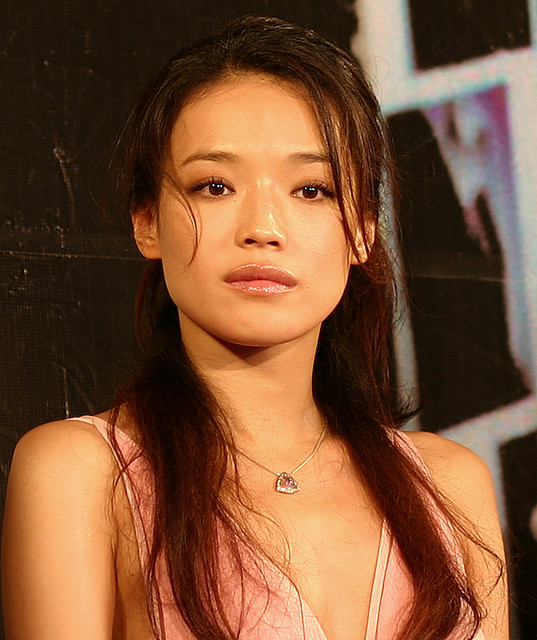
Shu at the premiere of Three Times in Taipei in 2005

Shu starred in Derek Yee's 1996 film Viva Erotica, about the erotic film industry in Hong Kong, opposite Karen Mok and Leslie Cheung. For her performance, she won both Best Supporting Actress and Best New Performer at the 16th Hong Kong Film Awards in 1997. She also starred in Portland Street Blues (1998) opposite Sandra Ng, and won Best Supporting Actress at the 35th Golden Horse Awards for her performance. She has since appeared in Hong Kong films such as City of Glass (1998), the box office hit Gorgeous (1999), Stanley Kwan's The Island Tales (1999) and Hou Hsiao-hsien's Millennium Mambo (2001), making her transition into mainstream acting.

=== 2002–2009 ===
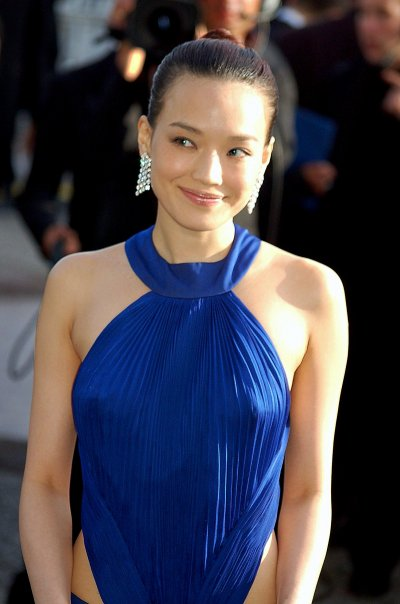
Shu at the 2009 Cannes Film Festival

In 2002, Shu starred in the French film The Transporter, the first installment of the Transporter franchise. This marked her first foray into the American market. Among Shu's earlier notable works were The Foliage (2004), a romance film set in Yunnan during the Cultural Revolution. She won Best Actress at the 13th Shanghai Film Critics Awards for her performance. Shu worked with Hou again in Three Times (2005), which premiered in competition at the 58th Cannes Film Festival and won Shu Best Leading Actress at the 42nd Golden Horse Awards. In 2006, Shu starred in the third installment of the gangster film My Wife Is a Gangster alongside Korean actor Lee Beom-soo.

She then starred alongside Tony Leung Chiu-wai and Takeshi Kaneshiro in the crime drama Confession of Pain (2006). In 2008, she had a small but memorable role in the American romantic comedy New York, I Love You. Shu served as a jury member at the 58th Berlin International Film Festival in 2008, and the 62nd Cannes Film Festival in 2009. The same year, she was honored at the Huabiao Awards as Best Actress for the Taiwan and Hong Kong region for her performance in the romantic comedy film If You Are the One, directed by Feng Xiaogang. The romantic comedy was the highest-grossing Chinese film of the year.

=== 2010–2023 ===
Shu at the 2015 Cannes film festival

Shu starred in Journey to the West: Conquering the Demons (2013), directed by Stephen Chow and loosely based on the Chinese literary classic Journey to the West. The film overtook Lost in Thailand to become the highest-grossing Chinese movie. Shu reunited with Hou in his first wuxia film, The Assassin (2015), starring as the title character. The film received overwhelmingly positive reviews at the 68th Cannes Film Festival, and Shu won Best Actress at the 10th Asian Film Awards for her performance. The film was selected as the Taiwanese entry for Best Foreign Language Film at the 88th Academy Awards. The same year, she starred in the blockbuster film Mojin: The Lost Legend, adapted from popular adventure novel series Ghost Blows Out the Light.

In 2016, Shu, Feng Shaofeng and Victoria Song starred in the Chinese remake of My Best Friend's Wedding. She was also cast in fantasy comedy The Village of No Return, which premiered at the first day of Spring Festival in 2017. In 2017, Shu starred in Stephen Fung's The Adventurers alongside Jean Reno and Andy Lau. Shu appears in the 2019 science fiction film Shanghai Fortress, adapted from the 2006 novel Once Upon a Time in Shanghai. In 2023, Shu served as a jury member at the 80th Venice International Film Festival.

=== 2024–present ===
In June 2024, Shu was invited to join the Actors Branch of the Academy of Motion Picture Arts and Sciences. In 2025, Shu starred in Bi Gan's epic science fiction drama film Resurrection, which won the Prix Spécial at the 78th Cannes Film Festival. In the same year, Shu made her directorial debut with the film Girl, which had its world premiere in competition at the 82nd Venice International Film Festival. The film won her the Best Director Award at the 30th Busan International Film Festival and Best New Director at the 44th Hong Kong Film Awards.

== Modeling and other ventures ==
From 2006 to 2009, Shu was selected by Kenzo Takada to be global spokesperson of the third advertising campaign for its successful fragrance Flower by Kenzo. She also worked as a spokesperson for Shiatzy Chen.

Shu has been representing Frederique Constant in Asia as a brand ambassador since 2008. In 2009, she, along with Frederique Constant and Paint-a-Smile Foundation, repainted the murals on the walls of the cardiology department at the Beijing Children's Hospital.

Shu was also Emporio Armani's Asian ambassador for its Fall/Winter 2010 collection. and is also the brand spokesperson for Bulgari in China. Since 2023, she has been announced as global brand ambassador of Bulgari. In February 2023, Shu has been global spokesperson for American high-end fashion house Michael Kors. In March 2023, American luxury beauty brand Tom Ford Beauty announced Shu as their brand ambassador for Fragrance and Make-up for the China and Asia-Pacific regions. In October 2023, Italian luxury fashion house Bottega Veneta announced Shu Qi as global brand ambassador, which she also appeared in an exclusive campaign of the brand. In September 2024, Tom Ford Beauty named Shu as its global ambassador. In January 2025, American luxury beauty brand Estée Lauder named Shu as its global spokesperson for skincare.

== Personal life ==
Shu married Hong Kong actor-director Stephen Fung in 2016. The two, who met on the set of the romance drama Bishonen in 1997, remained friends for 20 years, but only dated for four years prior to marriage.

== Filmography ==
=== Film ===
Acting roles
Year	English title	Original title	Role	Notes
1995	Unexpected Challenges	灵欲轨道	Sha Sha	
1996	Sex & Zen II	玉蒲團二之玉女心經	Huan Ji	
1996	Street Angels	紅燈區	Ming Ming	
1996	Growing Up	人细鬼大之三个Handsup的少年	Qi Qi	
1996	Till Death Do Us Laugh	怪談協會	Ye	
1996	Viva Erotica	色情男女	Meng Qiao	
1997	Love: Amoeba Style	愛情Amoeba	Boy	
1997	The Fruit is Swelling	蜜桃成熟時1997	Herself	Cameo
1997	L-O-V-E... Love	超級無敵追女仔	Luo Fei	
1997	Those Were the Days	精装难兄难弟	Zhao Fangfang	
1997	My Dad Is a Jerk	對不起，多謝你	Angela	
1997	Love Is Not a Game, But a Joke	飛一般愛情小說	Ah Shan	
1998	The Lucky Guy	行運一條龍	Fang Fang	
1998	Young and Dangerous 5	98古惑仔之龍爭虎鬥	Deng Meiling	
1998	Portland Street Blues	古惑仔情義篇之洪興十三妹	Dao Baqi	
1998	Young and Dangerous: The Prequel	新古惑仔之少年激鬥篇	Ah Fei	
1998	The Storm Riders	風雲雄霸天下	Chu Chu	
1998	Love Generation Hong Kong	新戀愛世紀	Joey	
1998	Bishonen	美少年之戀	Clara	
1998	Extreme Crisis	B計劃	Anita Lee	
1998	City of Glass	玻璃之城	Yue Wen	
1998	Another Meltdown	碧血藍天	Chan Pun	
1999	When I Look Upon the Stars	天旋地戀	Kiki	
1999	Gorgeous	玻璃樽	Ah Bu	
1999	Iron Sister	悍婦崗	Sun Tiemei	
1999	A Man Called Hero	中華英雄	Mu Xiuluo	
1999	Dragon Heat	龍火	Herself	Cameo
1999	Metade Fumaca	半支煙	Ah Nan	
1999	My Loving Trouble 7	我愛777	Julia / 777	
2000	Bruce Law Stunts	特技猛龍	Herself	Documentary
2000	My Name is Nobody	賭聖3無名小子	Ku'er	
2000	The Island Tales	有時跳舞	Mei Ling	
2000	Hidden Whisper	小百無禁忌	Xiao Bai	
2000	Born to Be King	勝者為王	Deng Meiling	
2000	Skyline Cruisers	神偷次世代	June	
2000	Flyin' Dance	第一次的親密接觸	Qing Wu Fei Yang	
2000	For Bad Boys Only	BadBoy特攻	Guan Zheng	
2001	Martial Angels	絕色神偷	Cat	
2001	Millennium Mambo	千禧曼波	Vicky	
2001	Visible Secret	幽靈人間	June	
2001	Love Me, Love My Money	有情飲水飽	Ya Cai	
2001	Beijing Rocks	北京樂與路	Yang Yin	
2002	Home in My Heart	山顶上的钟声	Li Juan	
2002	The Wesley's Mysterious File	衛斯理藍血人	Bai Su	
2002	Women From Mars	當男人變成女人	Messenger of Hell	
2002	So Close	夕陽天使	Chen Ailin	
2002	Haunted Office	Office有鬼	Ah Shan	
2002	Just One Look	一碌蔗	Mysterious girl on balcony	Cameo
2002	The Transporter		Lai Kwai	
2003	Magic & Me	千變魔手	Herself	Documentary
2003	The Foliage	美人草	Ye Xingyu	
2003	Looking for Mr. Perfect	奇逢敵手	Xiao Ling	
2004	The Eye 2	見鬼2	Joey Cheung	
2005	Seoul Raiders	韓城攻略	JJ	
2005	Home Sweet Home	怪物	May	
2005	Three Times	最好的時光	Xiu Mei	
2006	Confession of Pain	傷城	Xi Feng	
2006	My Wife Is a Gangster 3	조폭 마누라 3	Lim Yaling	
2007	Forest of Death	森冤	Xia Songqi	
2007	The Electric Princess House	电姬馆	pregnant woman	Short film
2007	Blood Brothers	天堂口	Lulu	
2008	If You Are the One	非誠勿擾	Liang Xiaoxiao	
2009	Look for a Star	游龍戲鳳	Xue Milan	
2009	New York, I Love You		Chinese herbalist	
2010	City Under Siege	全城戒備	Angel	
2010	Legend of the Fist: The Return of Chen Zhen	精武風雲－陳真	Kiki	
2010	If You Are the One 2	非诚勿扰2	Liang Xiaoxiao	
2011	A Beautiful Life	不再讓你孤單	Li Peiru	
2011	10+10	十加十	young woman	Short film
2012	Love	愛	Fang Rouyi	
2012	The Second Woman	情謎	Huibao / Huixiang	
2012	Tai Chi 0	太極從零開始	Mother Yang	Cameo
2012	Tai Chi Hero	太極II：英雄崛起	Mother Yang	Cameo
2012	CZ12	十二生肖	David's wife	Cameo
2012	Beautiful University			Short film
2013	Journey to the West: Conquering the Demons	西遊·降魔篇	Miss Duan	
2014	Gone with the Bullets	一步之遥	Wan Yanying	
2015	The Assassin	刺客聶隱娘	Nie Yinniang	
2015	All You Need Is Love	落跑吧愛情	Ye Fenfen	Also screenwriter
2015	The Last Women Standing	剩者為王	Sheng Ruxi	
2015	Mojin: The Lost Legend	鬼吹燈之尋龍訣	Shirley Yang	
2016	My Best Friend's Wedding	我最好朋友的婚礼	Gu Jia	
2017	The Village of No Return	健忘村	Chen Yuxun	
2017	Journey to the West: The Demons Strike Back	西遊伏妖篇	Miss Duan	Cameo
2017	The Adventurers	俠盜聯盟	Ye Hong	
2018	The Island	一出好戏	Shanshan	
2019	Shanghai Fortress	上海堡壘	Lin Lan	
2023	Good Autumn, Mommy	寻她	Chen Fengdi	
2023	If You Are the One 3	非诚勿扰3	Liang Xiaoxiao	
2025	Resurrection	狂野时代	The Big Other / Mother / Voiceover	
TBA	Flayer	倒戗刺		
TBA	A Broken Deal	痞子爱人	Hengjie	
TBA		宅男恋河神		Produced by Hou Hsiao-hsien
TBA	Bull Brothers	牛兄牛弟		

Filmmaking credits
Year	Title	Director	Writer	Producer	Ref.
2025	Girl	Yes	Yes	No	

=== Television series ===
Year	English title	Original title	Role	Notes/Ref.
1999	Up Where We Belong	難得有情人	Gui Ping	
2001	The Duke of Mount Deer	小寶與康熙	Little Goldfish	Guest Star
2004	Feel 100%	百分百感覺	Nikki	Cameo
2004	Romance of Red Dust	風塵三俠之紅拂女	Hong Fu Nü	
2006	Stephen's Diary	老馮日記	Lao Ma's ex-girlfriend	Cameo
2025	The Resurrected	回魂計	Wang Hui-chun	Netflix original series

== Discography ==
Year	English title	Original title	Album	Notes
1998	"Frustrated"	心領	Portland Street Blues OST	
1998	"You Don't Know"	你不知道	Portland Street Blues OST	
2005	"Those Years, This Day"	那一年, 這一天	Seoul Raiders OST	with Richie Jen
2007	"Blood Brothers"	天堂口	Blood Brothers OST	
2009	"I Do"	—N/a	Look for a Star OST	with Andy Lau
2010	"Card Door"	卡門	Legend of the Fist: The Return of Chen Zhen OST	
2010	"Faraway Village"	遠方的故鄉	Legend of the Fist: The Return of Chen Zhen OST	
2010	"Goodbye"	再見	Legend of the Fist: The Return of Chen Zhen OST	
2010	"Happy"	快樂吧	Legend of the Fist: The Return of Chen Zhen OST	
2013	"Love in a Life Time"	一生所愛	Journey to the West: Conquering the Demons OST	
