= Millennium Mambo =

2001 Taiwanese film by Hou Hsiao-Hsien

- DVD cover
- Chinese: 千禧曼波
- Literal meaning: Mambo at the Year of the Turn of the Millennium
- Hanyu Pinyin: qiānxī mànbō
- Directed by: Hou Hsiao-hsien
- Written by: Chu T’ien-wen
- Produced by: Chu T’ien-wen; Gilles Ciment; Eric Heumann; Wen-Ying Huang
- Starring: Shu Qi; Jack Kao; Duan Chun-hao
- Narrated by: Shu Qi
- Cinematography: Mark Lee Ping Bin
- Edited by: Liao Ching-sung
- Music by: Giong Lim; DJ Fish; Yoshihiro Hanno
- Distributed by: Palm Pictures (U.S.)
- Release dates: 19 May 2001 (Cannes); 17 November 2001 (Taiwan)
- Running time: 119 minutes
- Country: Taiwan
- Language: Mandarin

Millennium Mambo (Chinese: 千禧曼波) is a 2001 Taiwanese romantic drama film directed by Hou Hsiao-hsien. The film was selected to compete for the Palme d'Or at the 2001 Cannes Film Festival, where Tu Duu-chih won Technical Grand Prize.

== Plot ==
The main character, Vicky (Shu Qi), serves as the principal narrator of this film, revealing to the audience in 2011 details of her life from a decade earlier. She describes her youth and the changes her life undergoes at the beginning of the new millennium. She works as a hostess in a trendy bar. Vicky is torn between two men, Hao-Hao and Jack, and her parallel love affairs showcase her inner life and her attitude towards her fleeting youth.

== Cast ==
Actor	Role
Shu Qi	Vicky
Jack Kao	Jack
Duan Chun-hao	Hao-Hao
Chen Yi-Hsuan	Xuan
Jun Takeuchi	Jun
Doze Niu	Doze
Jenny Tseng Yan Lei	
Pauline Chan	
Huang Xiao Chu	

According to Maggie Cheung, speaking at a press conference for Wong Kar Wai’s In the Mood for Love, she and Tony Leung Chiu-wai were initially tapped to play the main roles in Millennium Mambo.

== Reception ==
Upon release the film received favourable reviews from critics, on Rotten Tomatoes the film has an approval rating of 84% based on 34 critics, with an average rating of 7.4/10. On Metacritic the film has a score of 72% based on 12 critics indicating generally favourable reviews.

Stephen Short of Time Asia perceived the film's depth as shallow, calling the script "feckless" for not developing the relationship between Hao-Hao and Vicky further.

== Awards and nominations ==
- 2001 Cannes Film Festival
  - Won: Technical Grand Prize (Tu Duu-Chih for sound design)
  - Nominated: Palme d'Or
- Chicago International Film Festival
  - Won: Silver Hugo (Hou Hsiao-hsien)
- Ghent International Film Festival
  - Won: Best Director (Hou Hsiao-hsien)
  - Nominated: Grand Prix
- Golden Horse Film Festival
  - Won: Best Cinematography (Pin Bing Lee)
  - Won: Best Original Score (Lim Giong)
  - Won: Best Sound Effects (Tu Duu-Chih)
