= 44th Golden Horse Awards =

Award ceremony for Chinese-language films of 2006 and 2007

- Promotional poster
- Date: December 8, 2007
- Site: Taipei Arena, Taipei, Taiwan
- Hosted by: Pauline Lan, Blackie Chen and Angela Chow
- Preshow hosts: Dennis Nieh and Miranda Lu
- Organized by: Taipei Golden Horse Film Festival Executive Committee

Highlights
- Best Feature Film: Lust, Caution
- Best Director: Ang Lee; Lust, Caution
- Best Actor: Tony Leung Chiu-wai; Lust, Caution
- Best Actress: Joan Chen; The Home Song Stories
- Most awards: Lust, Caution (7)
- Most nominations: Lust, Caution (11)

Television in Taiwan
- Channel: Star Chinese Movies
- Ratings: 3.09 (average)

The 44th Golden Horse Awards (Mandarin:第44屆金馬獎) took place on December 8, 2007 at the Taipei Arena in Taipei, Taiwan.

== Winners and nominees ==
Winners are listed first and highlighted in boldface.

| **Best Feature Film**: **Lust, Caution**; What on Earth Have I Done Wrong?!; Getting Home; The Home Song Stories; Eye in the Sky | **Best Short Film**: **Fly our Blue**; Temptation; Summer of Magic; Father's Finger |
| **Best Documentary**: **Hollywood Chinese**; Exotic WxoticismL Plant Wars | **Best Animation Feature** - |
| **Best Director**: **Ang Lee — Lust, Caution**; Jiang Wen — The Sun Also Rises; Derek Yee — Protégé; Yau Nai-hoi — Eye in the Sky | **Best Leading Actor**: **Tony Leung Chiu-wai — Lust, Caution**; Zhao Benshan — Getting Home; Gurmit Singh — Just Follow Law; Aaron Kwok — The Detective |
| **Best Leading Actress**: **Joan Chen — The Home Song Stories**; Tang Wei — Lust, Caution; Li Bingbing — The Knot; Rene Liu — Kidnap | **Best Supporting Actor**: **Tony Leung Ka-fai — The Drummer**; Wu Jing — Invisible Target; Joel Lok — The Home Song Stories; Louis Koo — Protégé |
| **Best Supporting Actress**: **Fan Bingbing — The Matrimony**; Janine Chang — What on Earth Have I Done Wrong?!; Maggie Shiu — Eye in the Sky; Alice Tzeng — Secret | **Best New Performer**: **Tang Wei — Lust, Caution**; Eddie Peng — My DNA Says I Love You; Joel Lok — The Home Song Stories; Enno Cheng — Summer's Tail |
| **Audience Choice Award**: **Getting Home**; Lust, Caution; What on Earth Have I Done Wrong?!; The Home Song Stories; Eye in the Sky | **FIPRESCI Prize** **(award for first and second features)**: **What on Earth Have I Done Wrong?!** |
| **Outstanding Taiwanese Film of the Year**: **Secret**; What on Earth Have I Done Wrong?!; The Drummer | **Outstanding Taiwanese Filmmaker of the Year**: **Ang Lee**; Jay Chou; Doze Niu |
**Lifetime Achievement Award**: **Edward Yang**
