= 44th Golden Bell Awards =

- Date: October 16, 2009
- Site: Sun Yat-sen Memorial Hall, Taipei, Taiwan
- Hosted by: Hsu Nai-lin; Chen Ya-lan; Vincent Liang; Bianca Bai
- Organized by: Bureau of Audiovisual and Music Industry Development

Television coverage
- Network: TTV

The 44th Golden Bell Awards (Mandarin:第44屆金鐘獎) was held on October 16, 2009 at Sun Yat-sen Memorial Hall in Taipei, Taiwan. The ceremony was broadcast live by TTV.

== Winners and nominees ==
Below is the list of winners and nominees for the main categories.

Program/Award	Winner	Network
Television Broadcasting
Individual Awards
Lifetime Achievement Award	Wenying	
TV Series Actor Award	Mark Chao - "Black and White"	PTS
TV Series Actress Award	Linda Liu - "Hakka Theater - female Sa marriage"	Hakka TV
TV Series supporting actor award	Chen Bor-jeng - "You are my only"	PTS
TV Series Supporting Actress award	Phoebe Huang - "Story of time"	CTV
TV Series Director	Cai Yuexun - "Black and White"	PTS
TV Series Screenplay Award	Wen Yihui - "Hakka Theater - female Sa marriage"	Hakka TV
Comprehensive show host award	廖慶學 - "Chinese Grand Experience"	Eastern Broadcasting Corporation
Variety show host award	Hu Zixiong - "Challenge 101"	CTV
Mini-series/Movie supporting actor award	Chang Kuo-tung - "PTV drama Life Exhibition - Fresh retirement life"	PTS
Miniseries/Movie Supporting Actress	Ding Ye Tian - "PTV drama Life Exhibition - early autumn walk"	PTS
Mini-series/Movie Screenplay Award	Zheng Wan Pin, Ma Ziming - "PTV drama Life Exhibition - My grandmother was astronaut"	PTS
Mini-series/Movie director Award	Wang Zhuanzong - "PTV drama Life Exhibition - My grandmother was an astronaut"	PTS
Mini-series/Movie actor	Xiajing Ting - "PTV drama Life Exhibition - thirty seconds later"	PTS
Mini-series/Movie actress award	Vicky Chen - "test tube immortals"	PTS
Children show host award	Zhao Ziqiang - "Fruity Pie"	PTS
Art and Design Award	Guo Zhen Yu, Chen Xin Ping, Dai Dewei - "Black and White"	PTS
Sound Award	Wang Xiwen, CAO Yuan Feng, Gao Wei Yan - "PTV drama of life ─ sun quilt show good weather"	PTS
Lighting Award	Wang Han Zhang - "Long live the music"	PTS
Cinematography Award	Yang Wei Han - "Hakka TV movie theaters - one thousand eight hundred ninety-five Yi Wei"	Hakka TV
Editing Award	Leizhen Qing - "PTV drama Life Exhibition - love is you"	PTS
Non-drama Director Award	Liu Song, Xie Yan Zhi - "Record view: Formosa's Ring - a dialogue with nature" <Episode III - Harmony>	PTS
Programme Awards
TV Series	Black and White	PTS
Variety Show Award	All the biggest party	CTI
Comprehensive program award	Adventure King	SETTV
Educational and cultural program award	step by step to discover new Taiwan	TVBS
Children Program Award	Math is Fun	TITV
Mini-series/Movie award	Life PTV drama show - my grandmother was astronaut	PTS
Animation Program Award	LaMB detention Angel	American super jump Ltd., Taiwan Branch (Animax)
Traditional drama program award	surging Zheng Chenggong	PTS
Marketing Advertising Awards
Channel Advertising Awards	My Queen	SETTV
Program Marketing Award	Black and White	PTS
Innovative Technology Award	PTV drama Life Exhibition - Lost glass beads	PTS
Research and Development Award	Chen Hou Yu - 現場播出自動側錄分段暨線上借閱系統	TTV
