= Ivy Chen =

Taiwanese actress and model

- 陳意涵
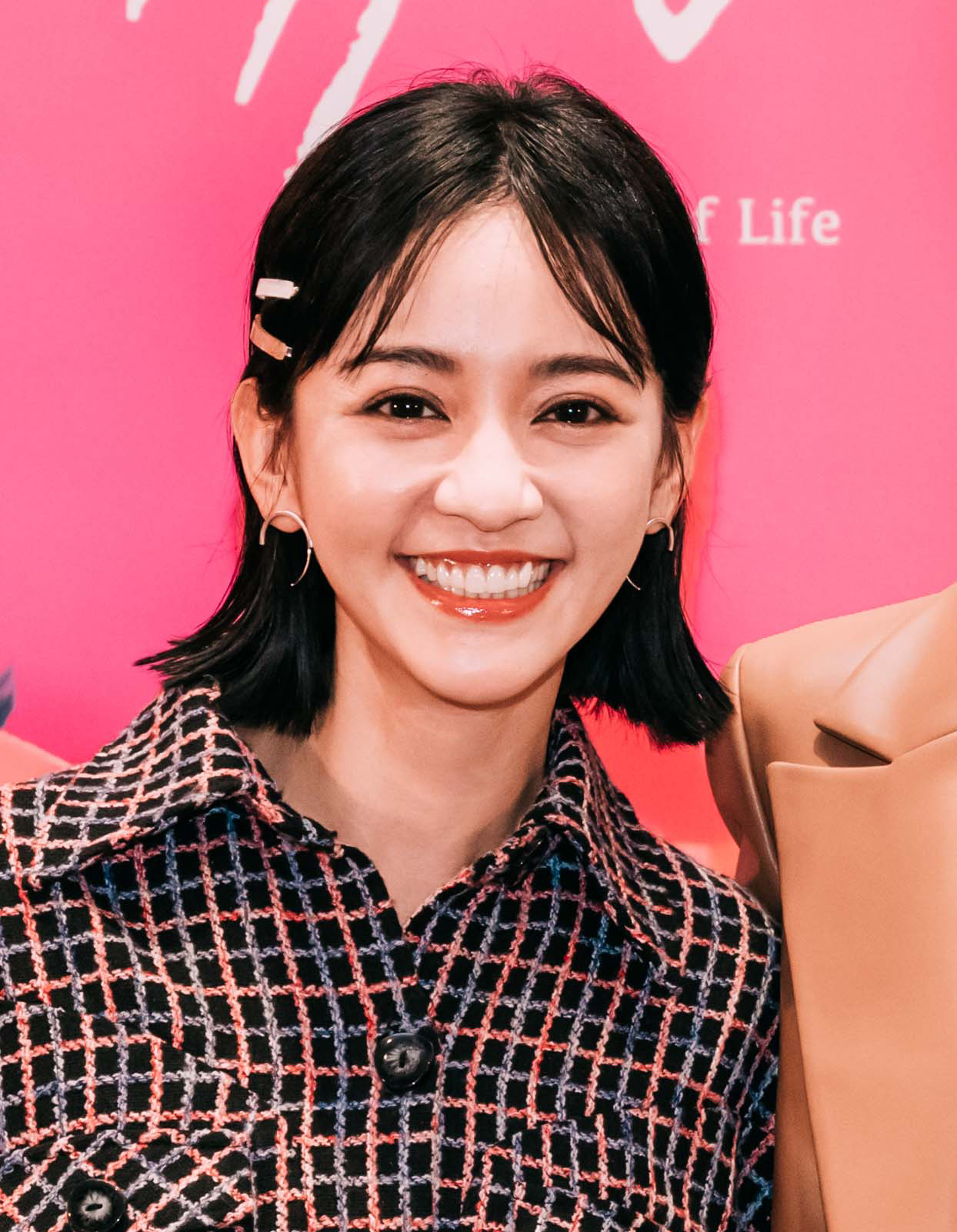
- Chen in 2021
- Born: Taipei, Taiwan
- Education: Jinwen University of Science and Technology (BS)
- Occupations: Actress; commercial model
- Years active: 2005–present
- Spouse: Hsu Fu-hsiang (m. 2018)
- Children: 2

Chinese name
- Traditional Chinese: 陳意涵
- Simplified Chinese: 陈意涵
Transcriptions
Standard Mandarin
- Hanyu Pinyin: Chén Yìhán

Ivy Chen Yi-han (Chinese: 陳意涵; pinyin: Chén Yìhán) is a Taiwanese actress.

In 2002, she appeared in the Taiwanese variety show Guess and was a contestant in the "Do Not Judge a Book by Its Cover" (人不可貌相) segment. She was later signed by a talent agent from Prajna Works and made appearances in many commercials and music videos.

== Early life ==
She graduated with an information management degree from Jinwen University of Science and Technology.

== Personal life ==
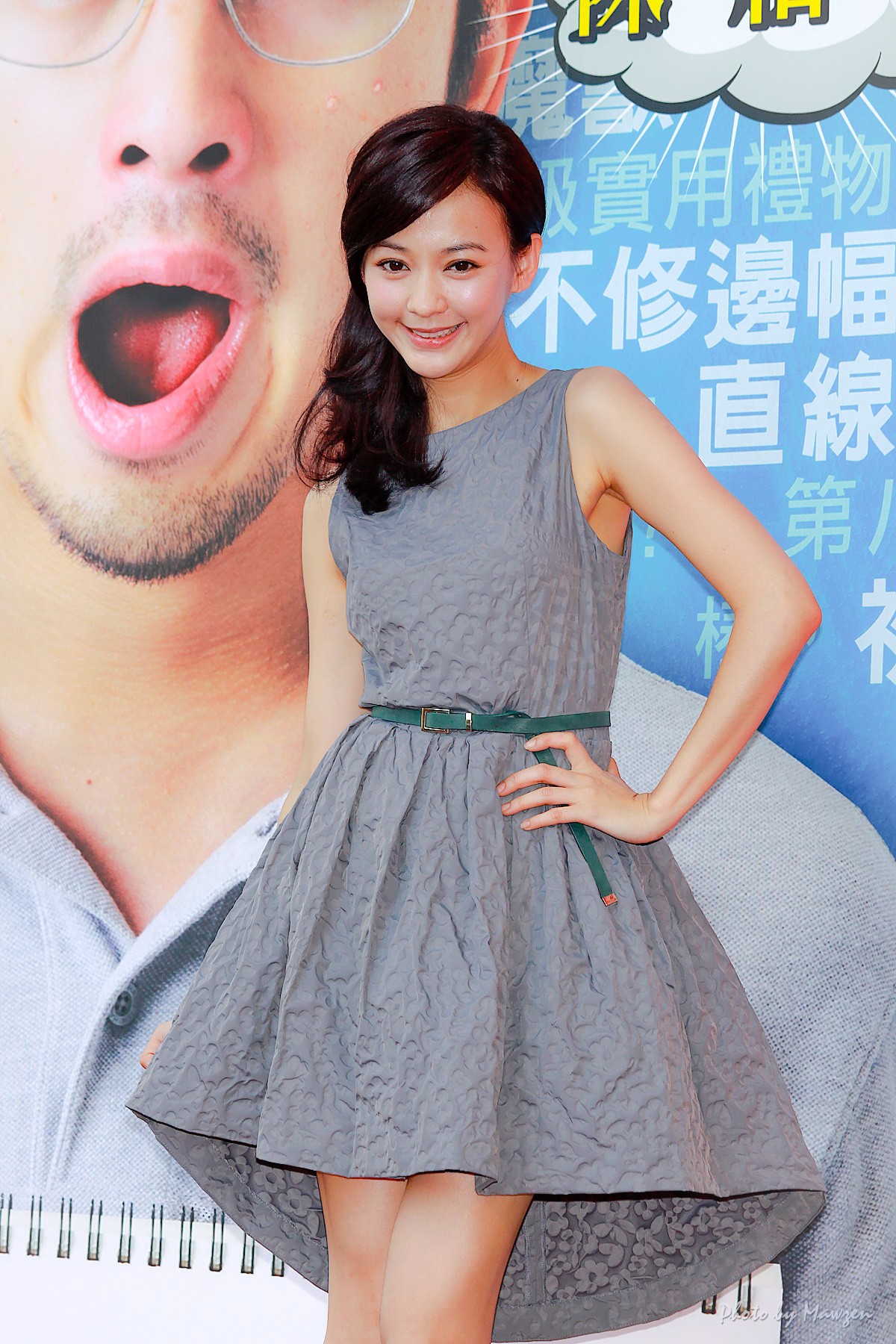
Chen in 2013

In August 2018, Chen married Taiwanese director Hsu Fu-hsiang (許富翔).

In Feb 2019, She has a son named Hsiao Chu (小初).

== Filmography ==
=== Film ===
Year	English title	Original title	Role	Notes
2006	The Road in the Air	單車上路	Mei	Chinese Film Media Awards for Best Newcomer
2007	Spider Lilies	刺青	Zhenzhen	
2009	Our Island, Our Dreams	星月無盡	Huang Xingjun	
2009	Hear Me	聽說	Yangyang	Taipei Film Festival - Best Actress Award; Global Chinese Awards for Best Actress in Film (Taiwan)
2009	Ma Zhuo			
2012	Black & White Episode I: The Dawn of Assault	痞子英雄首部曲: 全面開戰	Chen Lin	Deleted scenes
2012	Love	愛	Lee Yijia	
2012	Silent Code	BBS鄉民的正義	Xiang	
2012	Ripples of Desire	花漾	Bai Xiaoxiang	
2012	Splash 24 Hours Taiwan			
2013	Campus Confidential	愛情無全順	Kiki Liang	
2014	Girls	閨蜜	希汶	
2014	Paradise in Service	軍中樂園	阿娇	
2014	Bad Sister	壞姐姐之拆婚聯盟	黄二珊	
2015	Let's Get Married	咱們結婚吧		
2015	Time to Love	新步步驚心	马尔泰若曦	
2016	The Eight Immortals in School 2			
2018	Girls 2		Xiwen	
2018	Really?			
2018	More than Blue	比悲傷更悲傷的故事	Song Yuan-yuan (Cream)	
2018	Back to the Good Times			
2025	Sunshine Women's Choir	陽光女子合唱團	Li Hui-Jen	
TBA	Guns and Kidneys	枪炮腰花	Xiao Chu	

=== Television series ===
Year	English title	Original title	Role	Notes
2006	Smiling Pasta	微笑Pasta	Tian Xin	Episode 15
2007	Struggle	奮鬥	Fang Ningshan	
2007	I Want to Become a Hard Persimmon	我要變成硬柿子	Sun Shishi	
2008	Changjiang Yi Hao	長江一號	Xiao Dujuan	
2009	Black & White	痞子英雄	Chen Lin	Global Chinese Awards for Best Actress in Television (Taiwan); QQ Star Awards for Best Television Actress of Hong Kong/Taiwan
2010	Butterfly & Sword	新流星蝴蝶劍	Sun Xiao Die	
2011	Lian Ai SOS	戀愛SOS	Su Xiaonan	
2011	Modern People	摩登新人類	Xia Hongguo	
2011–12	Skip Beat!	華麗的挑戰	Gong Xi	Taiwanese adaptation of the manga
2014	You Light Up My Star	你照亮我星球		Guest role
2014	Tiny Times 1.0: Origami Times	小时代之折纸时代	Lin Xiao	
2017	Mr. Delicious Miss Match	火柴小姐和美味先生	Ruan Tang	
2017	Midnight Diner	深夜食堂	Customer (cameo)	Remake of Japanese drama Shinya Shokudo
2017	Love Is In The Air	幸福，近在咫尺	蒋一依	
2017	You Are the One	愛情築夢師	Meng Yimeng	
2021	Road to Rebirth	愛在星空下	Sun Xiao Ai	
2021	The Arc of Life	她們創業的那些鳥事	Xia Zhi	TV series

=== Music video appearances ===
Year	Title	Artist
2005	"Paper Plane" ("紙飛機")	Daniel Chang
2006	"Early Morning Girl" ("清晨女子")	Chou Chuan-huing
2006	"Hurt Without Sound" ("傷痛無聲")	Chou Chuan-huing
2006	"Break Up, Not Apart" ("分手不分開")	Vincent Wong
2009	"Accompany with Me" ("我的依賴")	Jolin Tsai
2011	"Touch My Heart"	Show Lo
2024	"The Moon" ("南方的月亮")	Ella Chen

== Awards and nominations ==
Year	Award	Category	Nominated work	Result
2010	12th Taipei Film Awards	Best Actress	Hear Me	Won
2012	49th Golden Horse Awards	Best Supporting Actress	Love	Nominated
2012	Changchun Film Festival	Best Supporting Actress	Love	Nominated
2014	51st Golden Horse Awards	Best Supporting Actress	Paradise in Service	Nominated
2023	60th Golden Horse Awards	Best Supporting Actress	Trouble Girl	Nominated
2024	5th Taiwan Film Critics Society Awards	Best Actress	Trouble Girl	Won
2024	26th Taipei Film Awards	Best Supporting Actress	Trouble Girl	Won
