= Lin Yixin =

Lin Yixin could be:

- Lin Yixin (politician), Procurator-General of the Fujian Provincial People's Procuratorate, Vice Chairman of the Fujian Provincial Committee of the Chinese People's Political Consultative Conference.
- Shara Lin (Chinese: 林逸欣), a Taiwanese musician, actress, singer, and television host.
