= Monga (film) =

- Film poster
- Directed by: Doze Niu
- Written by: Tseng Li-ting; Doze Niu
- Produced by: Dennis Yu; Chan Ya-wen; Yao Cheng-chung; Chang Hsueh-shun; Alan Tong; Lee Lieh; Doze Niu
- Starring: Ethan Juan; Mark Chao
- Cinematography: Jake Pollock
- Edited by: Ian Lin
- Music by: Sandee Chan
- Production company: Greenday Films
- Distributed by: Warner Bros. Pictures
- Release dates: January 29, 2010 (Berlinale); February 5, 2010 (Taiwan)
- Running time: 141 minutes
- Country: Taiwan
- Languages: Taiwanese Hokkien; Mandarin
- Box office: $4,244,158

Monga (Chinese: 艋舺; Pe̍h-ōe-jī: Báng-kah) is a 2010 Taiwanese gangster film. The film features Ethan Juan, Mark Chao, Ma Ju-lung, Rhydian Vaughan and Ko Chia-yen. Set in the titular district (now known as Wanhua District) of Taipei, the film follows the coming-of-age of Mosquito and initiation into gang life in the 1980s. The film was directed and co-written by Doze Niu, who also appears in the film.

== Plot ==
In 1986, teenager Mosquito (Mark Chao) transfers into a troubled high school in Monga. On his first day, he stands up to harassment from Dog Boy (Chen Han-dian), impressing Dragon (Rhydian Vaughan), the son of Geta (Ma Ju-lung), leader of the Qingshui Temple Front gang. At home, Mosquito is estranged from his single mother Ling-wan (Lin Hsiu-ling), who is financially supported by Grey Wolf (Doze Niu), an old flame and waishengren gangster who frequents her beauty salon. Dragon soon recruits Mosquito into forming the Princes Gang, along with Monk (Ethan Juan), Monkey (Emerson Tsai) and A-po (Frankie Huang), who become his closest friends. Visiting a brothel, Mosquito also forms a relationship with Ning (Ko Chia-yen), a prostitute.

Geta orders the finger severing of Doggy, Dog Boy's father and a member of the rival Back Alley gang, for cheating in games on Temple Front turf. In retaliation, Dog Boy rapes Xiao Hui (Reen Yu), Dragon's girlfriend. The Princes kidnap Dog Boy and accidentally torture him to death. Geta punishes the five and severely beats Monk when he takes the blame out of his loyalty to Dragon. A recovering Monk overhears his father and Back Alley leader Masa (Hsing Feng) discussing Geta; many years ago, Geta had severed the former's arm to seize power.

In 1987, Geta sends the Princes into the mountains where they train in martial arts and weapons combat. At a celebration, Geta runs into Masa and his bodyguard Wim-kian (Wang Shih-hsien), Dog Boy's cousin. Wim-kian had encountered Grey Wolf in prison, who is interested in expanding into Monga; Geta turns down the offer. Gray Wolf meets with Wim-kian, advising him to take down Temple Front due to their dominance over the district. Wim-Kian approaches a disgruntled Monk, convincing him of the inevitability of the waishengren triad's takeover. Wim-kian assassinates Masa, while Monk shoots Geta while he is alone. Mosquito arrives too late and Geta dies in his arms.

Monk convinces the rest of the Princes to lay low in the Philippines while he stays behind, ostensibly to conduct his own investigation. Mosquito confides in Monkey about his suspicions on Wim-kian's culpability. Monkey witnesses Wim-kian and Grey Wolf in a secret meeting one night, but is caught and beaten into a coma. A despondent Mosquito visits Grey Wolf, telling him to look after his mother should anything happen to him; Grey Wolf instead convinces Mosquito go to the Philippines for his mother's sake. Mosquito visits Ning one last time and they kiss; later, he himself catches Monk meeting with Grey Wolf and Wim-kian. It is revealed that the Philippines plan is an ambush to wipe out the Princes. On the night of their departure, Grey Wolf has a crisis of conscience and visits Ling-wan. Through a postcard he sent Ling-wan many years ago, he discovers that he is Mosquito's biological father and rushes to stop the plan.

At Qingshui Temple, Mosquito confronts Monk, which is overheard by a driver loyal to Wim-kian. Wim-kian and his men soon arrive; in the ensuing fight, Monk attacks Wim-kian to save Dragon. A severely wounded Mosquito pursues Monk through the streets and tricks a conflicted Monk into a hug, giving Dragon the chance to kill him from behind. Dragon and A-po drag a delirious Mosquito from the scene, leaving his fate unknown.

In a flashback, the Princes Gang play truant from school. Monk extends a hand to Mosquito to help him over the school walls. Mosquito looks back one last time before joining them.

== Cast ==
- Mark Chao as Mosquito
- Ethan Juan as Monk
- Rhydian Vaughan as Dragon
- Frankie Huang as A-po
- Emerson Tsai as Monkey
- Ma Ju-lung as Boss Geta
- Doze Niu as Grey Wolf
- Wang Shih-hsien as Wim-kian
- Ko Chia-yen as Ning
- Chen Han-dian as Dog Boy
- Hsing Feng as Boss Masa
- Lin Hsiu-ling as Chou Ling-wan, Mosquito's mother
- Reen Yu as Xiao Hui
- Bamboo Chen as Geta's assistant

== Production ==
=== Filming ===
Monga is set in mid-1980s in Wanhua (萬華) (in Basay language, Bangka; in Taiwanese Hokkien, Báng-kah, 艋舺) of Lungshan District, Taipei City (臺北市龍山區) for which it is named. The movie was filmed on location and landmarks such as Bangka Qingshui Temple (艋舺清水巖), Bangka Lungshan Temple (艋舺龍山寺), Snake Alley (華西街夜市), Bopiliao Historic Block (剝皮寮) and Ximending (西門町) appear in the film.

=== Music ===
The majority of the film's original score was composed by Sandee Chan, a Taiwanese singer-songwriter. The theme song of the film is "Making Love Out of Nothing at All" by Nicky Lee (李玖哲). It was originally performed by Air Supply.

== Release ==
Monga premiered at the 60th Berlin International Film Festival on 29 January 2010, in the Panorama section.

The film opened in Taiwan on 5 February 2010, and grossed NT$8.31 million (US$260,000) on its opening day and NT$59.32 million (US$1.85 million) on its opening week, ranking above worldwide hit Avatar on the box-office charts.

China Daily placed the film on their list of the best ten Chinese films of 2010.

English film poster

== Awards and nominations ==
- 2010 Taipei Film Awards

Won: Best Art Direction

Won: Best New Actor (Mark Chao)

Nominated: Best actor (Ethan Juan and Mark Chao)

Nominated: The Grand Prize

- 2010 54th Asia-Pacific Film Festival

Nominated: Best Actor (Mark Chao)

- 2010 Hawaii International Film Festival

Won: Network for the Promotion of Asian Cinema Award

- 2010 Tokyo International Film Festival

Nominated: Best Asian-Middle Eastern Film Award

- 2010 Stockholm International Film Festival

Won: Telia Film Award

- 2010 Golden Horse Awards

Won: Best Leading Actor (Ethan Juan)

Won: The Outstanding Taiwanese Filmmaker of the Year (Lee Lieh)

Won: Best Sound Effects

Nominated: Best Original Film Score (Sandee Chan)

Nominated: Best Art Direction

Nominated: The Outstanding Taiwanese Filmmaker of the Year (Doze Niu)

- 2011 5th Asian Film Awards

Won: Best New Actor (Mark Chao)

- 2011 11th Chinese Film Media Awards

Nominated: Best New Actor (Mark Chao)

The film was selected as the Taiwanese entry for the Best Foreign Language Film at the 83rd Academy Awards but it did not make the final shortlist.

== See also ==
- List of submissions to the 83rd Academy Awards for Best Foreign Language Film
- List of Taiwanese submissions for the Academy Award for Best Foreign Language Film
