= Black & White: The Dawn of Justice =

2014 Chinese-Taiwanese film by Tsai Yueh-hsun

- Film poster
- Directed by: Tsai Yueh-Hsun
- Written by: Tsai Yueh-Hsun; Yu Hsiao-hui
- Based on: Black & White
- Produced by: Tsai Yueh-Hsun; Yu Hsiao-hui
- Starring: Mark Chao; Lin Gengxin; Huang Bo; Janine Chang
- Cinematography: Jai Ip
- Edited by: Chiang Yi-ning
- Music by: Terdsak Janpan
- Production companies: Beijing Hualu Baina Entertainment Co., Ltd; Pulajia International Entertainment Co., Ltd; Yinli Entertainment Investment Co, Ltd; China Film Group Corporation; Beijing Yunqi Media Co., Ltd; Dongyang Hualu Baina Entertainment Co., Ltd; Yinli Entertainment International Co., Ltd
- Release dates: October 1, 2014 (China); October 2, 2014 (Taiwan)
- Running time: 126 minutes
- Countries: China; Taiwan
- Language: Mandarin
- Box office: ¥159.69 million (China)

Black & White: The Dawn of Justice (痞子英雄2：黎明升起) is a 2014 3D crime action film directed by Tsai Yueh-Hsun. Co-produced by China and Taiwan, the film is a prequel to and based on the television series Black & White (2009), and a sequel to Black & White Episode I: The Dawn of Assault (2012).

The film stars Mark Chao, reprising his role from the previous film and television series, with Lin Gengxin, Huang Bo, and Janine Chang also starring.

Black & White: The Dawn of Justice was released on October 1, 2014, in China and on October 2, 2014, in Taiwan.

== Premise ==
Set after the events of Black & White Episode I: The Dawn of Assault, Wu Ying Xiong teams up with Chen Zhen, an officer from the Eastern District with a radically different style, to find and stop the bombers terrorizing Harbor City.

== Cast ==
- Mark Chao as Wu Ying Xiong
- Lin Gengxin as Chen Zhen
- Huang Bo as Xu Da-Fu
- Janine Chang as Lan Hsi-Ying
- Shiou Chieh-kai as Huang Shih-Kai
- Jason Tsou as Cheng Nuo
- Terri Kwan as Du Xiao-Qing
- Guli Nazha as Li Xiao-Mu
- Chin Shih-Chieh as Shih Yung-Kuang
- Moon Wang as Kuo Cheng-Ying
- Tsai Yueh-Hsun as Lan C-En
- Tang Chih-Wei as Chen Chun-Lin
- Fion Hong as Ai Lv
- Hank Wu as Hulk
- Mandy Lieu as Ann
- Christopher Lee as Pu Chih-Kang
- Hu Ting-ting as Lo Yung-Chen
- Chen Han-dian as drug addict (deleted scenes)

== Reception ==
By October 7, the film had earned ¥159.69 million at the Chinese box office.
