= Toast Boy's Kiss =

- Japanese DVD cover art
- Also known as: Toast Man's Kiss
- Traditional Chinese: 吐司男之吻
- Hanyu Pinyin: Tǔsī Nán zhī Wěn
- Created by: Wu Meng-en
- Written by: Chyi Hsi-lin; Lee Hsu-min
- Directed by: Doze Niu
- Starring: Lee Kang-i; Lee Wei; Chang Chia-hui; Tsai Pei-lin; A-Pang; Chen Hsi-feng; Phoebe Huang; Doze Niu
- Opening theme: "Ting Bu Dao Ni" (聽不到你)
- Composers: Tsao Teng-chang; Huang Hui-wen; Hsieh Meng-wei
- Country of origin: Taiwan
- Original languages: Mandarin; some Taiwanese Hokkien
- No. of episodes: 18

Production
- Executive producers: Wang Jun; Chyi Hsi-lin; Chen Hui-ying
- Producer: Hsiao Yeh
- Running time: 75 minutes
- Production company: Full Power Production

Original release
- Network: Taiwan Television
- Release: July 30 – November 26, 2001

Related
- Toast Boy's Kiss 2 (2004)

Toast Boy's Kiss is a 2001 Taiwanese romantic comedy television series produced by Hsiao Yeh and directed by Doze Niu, starring Lee Wei and Lee Kang-i. The show was first broadcast on Taiwan Television, was one of the most popular Taiwanese series in 2001.

A spin-off sequel was broadcast in 2004 on Eastern Television.

== Awards and nominations ==
#	Award	Category	Name	Result
37th	Golden Bell Awards	Best Actor	Lee Wei	Nominated
