= Chien Te-men =

Taiwanese actor

- 乾德門
- Born: Bao'erjigude Qiangutengdemen (Note: Bao'erjigude is another spelling of Borjigid.) (包爾吉古德·錢顧騰德門); 28 August 1943; Hohhot, Suiyuan, Republic of China
- Died: 5 February 2018 (aged 74); New Taipei City, Taiwan
- Occupation: Actor
- Years active: 1970–2018

Chinese name
- Traditional Chinese: 乾德門
Transcriptions
Standard Mandarin
- Hanyu Pinyin: Qián Démén
Hakka
- Romanization: Kôn Tet-mùn
Southern Min
- Hokkien POJ: Khiân Tek-bûn

Chien Te-men (Chinese: 乾德門; pinyin: Qián Démén; Pe̍h-ōe-jī: Khiân Tek-bûn, 28 August 1943 – 5 February 2018) was a Taiwanese actor of Mongol descent.

== Selected filmography ==
- New Legend of Madame White Snake (1992) as Fahai.
- The Heaven Sword and Dragon Saber (1994).
- Spicy Teacher (2000).
- The Rose (2003).
- KO One (2005).
- The Hospital (2006).
- Bull Fighting (2007).
- Sweet Relationship (2007).
- The X-Family (2007).
- Black & White (2009).
- K.O.3an Guo (2009).
- Down with Love (2010).
- Black & White Episode I: The Dawn of Assault (2012).
- Ti Amo Chocolate (2012).
- Deja Vu (2013).
- Angel 'N' Devil (2014).
- Mr. Right Wanted (2014).
- Bitter Sweet (2015).
- Taste of Love (2015).
- KO ONE: RE-CALL (2018).
