= Love (2012 film) =

- Taiwan poster
- Directed by: Doze Niu
- Written by: Doze Niu; Tseng Li-ting; Wang Qi-nan
- Produced by: Jimmy Huang; Wang Zhonglei; Doze Niu
- Starring: Zhao Wei; Shu Qi; Mark Chao; Ethan Juan; Eddie Peng; Amber Kuo; Ivy Chen; Doze Niu
- Cinematography: Mark Lee Ping Bin
- Edited by: Tseng Li-ting
- Music by: Chen Chien-chi
- Production companies: Honto Productions; Huayi Brothers
- Distributed by: Warner Bros. Pictures (Taiwan); Huayi Brothers (China)
- Release dates: February 10, 2012 (Taiwan); February 14, 2012 (China)
- Running time: 150 minutes
- Countries: Taiwan; China
- Languages: Mandarin; Taiwanese Min Nan
- Budget: NT$300 million
- Box office: US$29.3 million

Love is a 2012 Taiwanese-Chinese romance film directed and cowritten by Doze Niu. It stars Zhao Wei, Shu Qi, Mark Chao, Ethan Juan, Eddie Peng, Amber Kuo, Ivy Chen and Doze Niu. Love premiered in the Panorama section of the 62nd Berlin International Film Festival. The film features an ensemble cast, with the stories revealed to be interwoven as the plot progresses.

== Plot ==
Love showcases the different types of relationships: family, friends, lovers, coworkers, and also those between strangers are shown to express the different types of love people have every day. Through the three subplots of eight interwoven characters, the ups and downs of love, what love has to offer and what love has to take, the film shows the relative situations in which love can take hold.

=== Subplot 1: Yi Jia, Xiao Min, and Ah Kai ===
Yi Jia is a simple, ordinary girl that goes along with everybody around her. She is in the Cycling Team of her university, and plays the supportive role called the domestique. Her real life is similar to that of her role on the cycling team: she has no characteristic, no special talents and is not very outstanding in general. When she is with her best friend—Xiao Min—she also assumes a supportive role, just like on the cycling team. Xiao Min is best friends with Yi Jia, and yet is the complete opposite of Yi Jia. Xiao Min is assertive, talented, confident, has a good family background, and has everybody's attention. She also has a boyfriend, Ah Kai. Ah Kai is interested in filming and dreams to be a successful director in the future, but his dream is often tossed around as a joke by people he knows, with the exception of Xiao Min. These three best friends complement each other, forming a strong friendship, but all this comes to a halt when Yi Jia finds herself pregnant.

=== Subplot 2: Mark, Xiao Ye ===
Mark is a young and successful entrepreneur. He is self-indulgent, cool, modern and casual. His motif about woman is, "As long as it is worth it to conquer" and has an attitude represented with the phrase, "If you never have to do it, then you never miss it". On a trip to Beijing, Mark meets Xiao Ye. Xiao Ye is a single mother with a seven-year-old son, Dou Dou, and is Mark's realty estate agent. Their meeting, however, did not go well, as it ended in the police office with Xiao Ye suffering a broken leg and having her son become lost along the way. Eventually, with the help of Mark, Dou Dou is found. Through this experience, and his time with the mother and son, Mark finds himself developing intimate feelings that he never had with people before.

=== Subplot 3: Xiao Kuan, Rou Yi, Chao Ping ===
Xiao Kuan has a simple, pure, boy-next-door personality. Rou Yi is a materialistic woman, dependent on rich men, and mistress of Chao Ping, which leads to her life in the limelight. Chao Ping is an aging man, and CEO of a well-known company. After an unhappy night of partying, Rou Yi and Chao Ping argue on the way home. Rou Yi gets out of the car, continuing the argument, which is rapidly growing more heated, and the ensuing fight is witnessed by Xiao Kuan. In a moment of heroism, Xiao Kuan grabs Rou Yi, running away from Chao Ping and brings her back to his house, which is quiet and serene. From then on, they became acquaintances, and Xiao Kuan's place serves a place of escape for Rou Yi - a place away from the lights and attention. Through Xiao Kuan's simple life, Rou Yi contemplates her life and eventually comes to the conclusion that it is time to change and take control.

== Cast ==
- Shu Qi as Rou Yi
- Ethan Juan as Xiao Kuan
- Ivy Chen as Yi Jia
- Mark Chao as Mark
- Amber Kuo as Xiao Min
- Eddie Peng as Ah Kai
- Zhao Wei as Xiao Ye
- Doze Niu as Chao Ping
- Yu Mei-ren as Mrs. Li
- Lung Shao-hua as Mr. Li
- Yang Kuei-mei as Mark's mother

=== Cameo appearance ===
- Ralf Chiu as Mark's assistant
- Rhydian Vaughan as Xiao Kuan's colleague
- Frankie Huang as Xiao Kuan's colleague
- Emerson Tsai as Xiao Kuan's colleague
- Chen Han-dian as Xiao Kuan's colleague
- Pu Hsueh-liang as Wedding host
- Kang Kang as Cycling coach

== Soundtrack ==
Love : Original Motion Picture Soundtrack

Soundtrack album by Various Artists
- Released: February 10, 2012
- Genre: Film soundtrack
- Label: HIM International Music

No.	Title	Writer(s)	Performer	Length
1.	"Love Preview 愛的預告"	Aki Huang	Hebe Tien	00:50
2.	"Love!"	Aki Huang	Hebe Tien	03:18
3.	"Call 110 愛新覺羅與葉赫那拉的相遇 (instrumental)"	Chen Chien-chi	Chen Chien-chi	01:59
4.	"Flying Bird 飛鳥"	Waa Wei, Han Li-kang	Waa Wei	05:18
5.	"Ài de nuǎn yáng hé xù 愛的暖陽和煦 (instrumental)"	Chen Chien-chi	Chen Chien-chi	03:03
6.	"Two Girls 兩個女孩 (instrumental)"	Chen Chien-chi	Chen Chien-chi	02:42
7.	"Fool 傻子"	Zheng Nan	Yoga Lin	03:34
8.	"Wǒ yě méi yǒu bà ba 我也沒有爸爸 (instrumental)"	Chen Chien-chi	Chen Chien-chi	03:52
9.	"Determination 決心 (instrumental)"	Chen Chien-chi	Chen Chien-chi	03:44
10.	"My Love"	Zheng Nan, Derek Shih	Hebe Tien	05:10
11.	"Falling 墜落 (instrumental)"	Chen Chien-chi	Chen Chien-chi	02:09
12.	"First Kiss 初吻 (instrumental)"	Chen Chien-chi	Chen Chien-chi	02:55
13.	"Dà tài yáng xià de cǎo dì 大太陽下的草地 (instrumental)"	Chen Chien-chi	Chen Chien-chi	01:53
14.	"Old Boy's Counterattack 老男孩的反擊 (instrumental)"	Chen Chien-chi	Chen Chien-chi	02:18
15.	"Us 我們"	Summer Lei	Waa Wei	04:01
16.	"Love Proverbs 愛的箴言"	Lo Wing-keung, Lo Ta-yu	Doze Niu	04:14
17.	"Waiting 等待 (instrumental)"	Chen Chien-chi	Chen Chien-chi	01:52
18.	"Love 愛 (instrumental)"	Chen Chien-chi	Chen Chien-chi	03:38
19.	"Fàng qīng diǎn 放輕點"	Lin Wei-che	Faith Yang	03:39

== Box office ==
In Taiwan, the film grossed more than NT$160 million. In China, the film grossed more than CN¥130 million.

== Awards and nominations ==
Award ceremony	Category	Recipients	Result
2012 Beijing College Student Film Festival	Best Director	Doze Niu	Nominated
13th Chinese Film Media Awards	Best Supporting Actress	Amber Kuo	Nominated
49th Golden Horse Awards	Best Director	Doze Niu	Nominated
49th Golden Horse Awards	Best Supporting Actress	Amber Kuo	Nominated
49th Golden Horse Awards	Best Supporting Actress	Ivy Chen	Nominated
49th Golden Horse Awards	Best Makeup and Costume Design	Hsu Li-wen and Fang Chi-lun	Nominated
49th Golden Horse Awards	Best Original Film Score	Chen Chien-chi	Nominated
2013 Huabiao Awards	Outstanding Coproduced Film	Love	Nominated
2012 Huading Awards	Best Actress in a Motion Picture	Shu Qi	Nominated
32nd Hong Kong Film Awards	Best Film from Mainland and Taiwan	Love	Nominated
2012 Taipei Film Festival	Best Supporting Actress	Amber Kuo	Won
