= Wang Bei =

Chinese actress (1931–2022)

- 王蓓
- Born: 28 April 1931; Nanjing, China
- Died: 1 March 2022 (aged 90)
- Other names: Wong Pui
- Occupation: Actress

Wang Bei (Chinese: 王蓓; 28 April 1931 - 1 March 2022), was a Chinese film actress.

== Biography ==
Wang was born at Nanjing, Jiangsu, China.

In 1948, Wang graduated from Nanjing Normal School and joined the Shanghai Kunlun Film Company as an actress. She made her film debut in same year as the heroine Xiao Tao in the film, The Life of Wu Xun, and has since appeared on the screen.

== Personal life ==
Wang's husband, Bai Hua, was a famous poet, playwright, novelist and essayist.

In 2008, Wang was diagnosed with Alzheimer's disease and lost her memories, only recognising her husband, Bai. Bai died in January 2019.

Wang died on 1 March 2022, at the age of 90.

== Selected filmography ==
- Crows and Sparrows (1949) as A-mei
- The Life of Wu Xun (1951) as Xiao Tao
- The Mights of the People (人民的巨掌) (1952)
- Evergreen (常青树) (1958)
- Ordinary Business (平凡的事业) (1958) as Peiming Lin, new kindergarten teacher
- Nie Er (1959) as Wan Qianhong
- The Magic Aster (马兰花) (1960) as Lan Xiao / Lan Da
- The Knife-Thrower (飞刀华) (1963)
- Great Waves Purify the Sand (大浪淘沙) (1966)

== Awards ==
- 1957 – Ministry of Culture's 1949-1955 Outstanding Film Award for "Crows and Sparrows".
- 2007 – "Special Honor Award" by the China Film and Performing Arts Society.
