= Brando Huang =

Taiwanese actor and television host

- 黃鐙輝
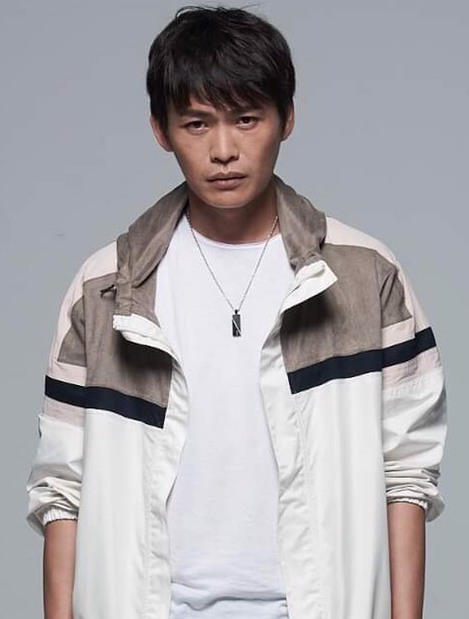
- Huang in 2012
- Born: 22 March 1981 (age 45); Huwei, Yunlin, Taiwan
- Other names: Huang Teng-hui; Huang Denghui; Frankie Huang
- Education: Chien Hsin University of Science and Technology (BS)
- Occupations: Actor; television host; former electronics engineer
- Years active: 2006–present
- Spouse: Lee Chen-chi (m. 2009)
- Children: 3

Chinese name
- Chinese: 黃鐙輝
Transcriptions
Standard Mandarin
- Hanyu Pinyin: Huáng Dènghuī
Southern Min
- Hokkien POJ: N̂g Teng-hui

Brando Huang (Chinese: 黃鐙輝; pinyin: Huáng Dènghuī; Pe̍h-ōe-jī: N̂g Teng-hui; born 22 March 1981) is a Taiwanese actor and television host.

== Early life and education ==
Born in Huwei, Yunlin, Huang attended Chien Hsin University of Science and Technology and graduated with a bachelor's degree in electronic engineering. After graduating, he became an engineer at Hsinchu Science and Industrial Park.

== Career ==
Huang had an interest in performing since young. Discovered by comedian Hsu Hsiao-shun, Huang started out by making numerous appearances in television shows where he is known for impersonating famous personalities such as the comedian Kang Kang and musician Wu Bai.

Huang's first acting role was in the series Your Home is My Home, and he has appeared in several films and television series since, including Monga, Monga Yao Hui, Partners in Crime and At Cafe 6. In 2015, he earned a Golden Bell Award nomination for his role in the television film Let the Sunshine In.

== Filmography ==
=== Television series ===
Year	English title	Original title	Role	Notes
2008	Your Home is My Home	歡喜來逗陣	Frankie	
2010	Rice Family	飯糰之家	Cao B	
2010	Endless Love	愛∞無限	No-Q	
2011	Monga Yao Hui	艋舺燿輝	Yeh Yung-chih	
2011	Hayate the Combat Butler	旋風管家	Kang Tai-lang	
2011	Happy Dandelion	幸福蒲公英	Kao Tsung-hsin	
2011	Wives	牽手	A-hui	Alternative title: The Other Hand
2011	Material Queen	拜金女王	Fang Chih-hui	Episode 2
2012	Office Girls	小資女孩向前衝	Kelly's husband	Episode 22
2012	Skip Beat!	華麗的挑戰	'Brid Rock' program producer	Episode 6
2012	The Woman Is Colored	女人花	Mr. Cheng	Episode 4
2012	Jump! Cheerleader	飆！企鵝里德	Cheng-chun	Cameo
2012	Gung Hay Fat Choy	我們發財了	Elevator maintenance staff	Episode 12
2012	KO One Return	終極一班2	Hsiang Huai-jen	Episode 7-8
2012	The Late Night Stop	小站	Young A-fa	Episode 11
2013	King Flower	金大花的華麗冒險	Hsiao-dao	Alternative title: Princess Stand In
2013	Dragon Legend	天龍傳奇	Bun seller	Cameo
2013	PMAM	—N/a	Director	Cameo
2014	First Kiss	真愛配方	Yu Hsiao-jen	
2014	Chocolat	流氓蛋糕店	A-chuan	
2014	Diva Journey	天后之徵	Chairman Tsai	Webseries
2015	Ba Ji Teenagers	一代新兵之八極少年	Mai Fulung	
2015	To the Dearest Intruder	致，第三者	Sun Chung-hsien	
2015	Be with Me	舞吧舞吧在一起	Yuan Kuang-tai	
2016	My Mother's Wedding	我媽的婚禮	A-chung	
2016	My Class	我的這一班	Pan Di	
2016	Taste of Life	甘味人生	Hsien Ge	Cameo
2016	Love of Sandstorm	植劇場-戀愛沙塵暴	Jogger	Cameo
2016	Miss in Kiss	惡作劇之吻	Chin Yi-chung	
2017	The Masked Lover	我的愛情不平凡	A-kou	Cameo
2017	Wake Up 2	麻醉風暴2	Dr. Chung	
2018	On Children	你的孩子不是你的孩子		
2018	Campus Heroes	高校英雄傳	Ou Chin-hsiung	
2019	Great Times	大時代	Himself	Cameo
2019	Triad Princess	極道千金	Li Jian-dong	Cameo
2019	Endless Love	天堂的微笑	Liu Tian-yao	
2019	Welcome Happy Together	鬥陣來鬧熱	Hsu Ching-pin	
2019	The Teenage Psychic 2	通靈少女2	Bruce	
2019	Wait For The Sun Wait For You	守著陽光守著你	Luo	
2019	The Mirror	鏡子森林	JJ	
2020	In Your Own Hands	人生算什麼	Huang Mu-chun	
2020	The Rootless	無主之子	Li Wen-cheng	
2020	Magic Moment	粉紅色時光	Bartender	Cameo, episode 1
2021	The Arc of Life	她們創業的那些鳥事	James	
2021	The Summer Temple Fair	神之鄉	Wang Da-yi	
2021	Gold Leaf	茶金	Bank Manager Chiu	
2021	The Memory Garden	如果花知道	Wang	
2022	Mom, Don't Do That!	媽，別鬧了！		
2022	Golden Dream On Green Island	茁劇場－綠島金魂		
2022	On Marriage	你的婚姻不是你的婚姻 - 恭請光臨曾賈府喜事		
2024	A Fight for Justice	無罪推定	Yang Ming-ter	

=== Film ===
Year	English title	Original title	Role	Notes
2010	Monga	艋舺	A-po	
2010	Love You 10,000 Years	愛你一萬年	Ta-tou	
2010	Juliets	朱麗葉		
2011	Leaving Gracefully	帶一片風景走	Huang Yen-wei	
2012	Air Man's Confession	空氣男的告白	A-feng	Television; Cameo
2012	Love	愛	Xiao Kuan's colleague	Cameo
2012	The Moonlight in Jilin	吉林的月光	Chou Tai-te	
2013	27°C – Loaf Rock	世界第一麥方	Ponkan	
2013	The Harbor	港都	Hung Hu	
2013	Hide and Seek: The Game Must Go On	躲貓貓	Teng Kuo-chih	Television
2014	Let the Sunshine In	浪子單飛	Wu Yung-feng	Television
2014	My Mandala	原來你還在	Driver	
2014	Lion Dancing	鐵獅玉玲瓏	A-chou	
2014	Partners in Crime	共犯	Police officer	
2014	Mole of Life	黑白	Yen	
2015	Lion Dancing 2	鐵獅玉玲瓏2	Tou-hui	
2015	Maverick	菜鳥	Monkey	
2015	Elena	愛琳娜	Chen Ching-kuei	
2015	We Are Family	我們全家不太熟	Billiard thug	Cameo
2016	White Lies, Black Lies	失控謊言	A-tien	
2016	At Cafe 6	六弄咖啡館	Gangster	
2016	Conqueror	征子	A-nan	Television
2016	My Egg Boy	我的蛋男情人	Supermarket manager	Cameo
2017	The Psychic Duo	胸性大發	Ghost	Television
2017	The Tag-Along 2	紅衣小女孩2	Chang Ming-hao	
2017	Andante	黑白鍵		Short film
2017	Condemned Practice Mode	徐自強的練習題	Animated voice	Documentary
2018	The Rope Curse	粽邪	Police officer	Cameo
2018	Monga Adventures	艋舺之江湖再現		
2019	Onstage Appearance	隨片登台	Director	Television
2019	The Coming Through	奇蹟的女兒	Huang Wen-bang	Television
2019	Mystery in the Mist	疑霧公堂	Lin Wen-ming	Television
2019	Lost and Found	失父招領	Kuo	Television
2020	Leaving Virginia	破處	Police Officer	
2020	After Journey	日後，回家路	Lee Yao-min	Short film
2020	Radio! Ready Oh!	陽光電台不打烊	Jack	Television
2021	Find A Bright Day	遺物清掃員	Chieh	Short film
2021	Moneyboys	金錢男孩	Client Zhang	
2021	American Girl	美國女孩	Liang Chong-hui's friend	
2021	Cuillere	白日夢外送王	Mr. Chuang	Television
2022	Khioh-hah-a	顧巢．抾箬仔	Hsu Tong-rong	Television
2022	Quan Zhi Ren Yuan	拳職人員		Television
2022	Gaga	哈勇家		
2025	Left-Handed Girl	左撇子女孩		

=== Variety show ===
Year	English title	Original title	Notes
2007	The Invincible Iron King	無敵鐵金剛	Assistant host
2007	The Price is Right	估價王	Assistant host
2008	Golden B Class	黃金B段班	Host
2008	Food Tasting	美食鑑定團	Assistant host
2009	Huan Xi Dou Ling Long	歡喜斗玲瓏	Assistant host
2010	Variety Duo	綜藝2人傳	On-location host
2010	Super King	綜藝大國民	Host
2010	Kaka	好神卡卡	Host
2011	Super	超級好神	Host
2013–present	Super Taste	食尚玩家－來去住一晚	Host
2014	We Are Coming	我們都來了	Host
2015	Super Red	超級紅人榜	Stand-in host
2017	Ji Ke Kuai Di	即嗑快遞	Stand-in host
2019	Fiv5	Fiv5鬪！龍虎門	Stand-in host
2021	Golden Era	黃金年代	
2021	Travel Together	請問 今晚住誰家	

=== Music video appearances ===
Year	Artist	Song title
2013	Action Tang	"Happy Farewell"
2016	Jacky Chen	"Sad Song"
2019	EggPlantEgg	"Happy!!! Drivers Love Song"
2019	Justin Su	"We All Have Good Nature"

== Awards and nominations ==
Year	Award	Category	Nominated work	Result
2015	50th Golden Bell Awards	Best Actor in a Miniseries or Television Film	Let the Sunshine in	Nominated
2019	54th Golden Bell Awards	Best Supporting Actor in a Miniseries or Television Film	The Coming Through	Won
2021	25th Asian Television Awards	Best Actor	The Rootless	Nominated
2022	47th Mediart Awards	Best Actor	Lost and Found	Won
