= Portrait of a Fanatic =

- DVD cover
- Traditional Chinese: 苦戀
- Simplified Chinese: 苦恋
- Literal meaning: Bitter Love
- Hanyu Pinyin: Kǔ Liàn
- Directed by: Wang Toon
- Written by: Wu Nien-jen
- Based on: Bitter Love by Bai Hua
- Starring: Muh Sy-Cherng; Hsu Chung-fei; Meng Yuan; Ku Chun; Nancy Hu; Doze Niu; Gua Ah-leh
- Cinematography: Lin Hung-chung
- Edited by: Wang Zhao-Xi; Hsieh Yi-hsiung
- Music by: Huang Mao-Shan
- Production company: Central Motion Picture Corporation
- Release date: October 22, 1982
- Running time: 112 minutes
- Country: Taiwan
- Languages: Mandarin; some English

Portrait of a Fanatic is a 1982 Taiwanese period film directed by Wang Toon, adapted by Wu Nien-jen from Bai Hua's 1980 namesake screenplay, which was first made into a film in mainland China that quickly received a ban there on orders of Deng Xiaoping himself. Part of China's scar literature, Bai Hua's story is set in mainland China and the United States. It follows the turbulent life of a patriotic Chinese painter from the 1930s to the 1970s, as he escapes Japan's bombings during the Second Sino-Japanese War, assassinations by the repressive Nationalist government during the Chinese Civil War, and after the founding of the People's Republic of China, the horrors of the Cultural Revolution when millions of intellectuals and artists were cruelly persecuted on trumped-up charges.

== Awards and nominations ==
- 1982 Golden Horse Awards
  - Won—Best Cinematography (Lin Hung-chung)
  - Nominated—Best Feature Film
