= Ma Ju-lung (actor) =

Taiwanese actor (1939–2019)

Ma Ju-lung (Chinese: 馬如龍; pinyin: Mǎ Rúlóng; 1 April 1939 in Taipei – 9 June 2019 in Taipei) was a Taiwanese actor.

== Biography ==
He played the stepfather of Van Fan's character Aga in the film Cape No. 7, a role that won him Best Supporting Actor at the 45th Golden Horse Awards in 2008. Ma's portrayal of Geta, a triad leader in Monga, won the Best Supporting Actor Award at the 2011 Chinese Film Media Awards.

Ma backed the 2010 Taipei mayoral campaign of Eric Chu.

Ma was admitted to the Shin Kong Wu Ho-Su Memorial Hospital in Taipei to treat an infection and died on 9 June 2019.

== Filmography ==
Year	Title	Role	Notes
1978	Half a Loaf of Kung Fu		
2008	Cape No. 7	Aga's Stepfather	
2010	Monga	Boss Geta	
2011	Warriors of the Rainbow: Seediq Bale	Han Chinese Trader	
2016	Feng yun gao shou		
2017	52Hz, I Love You		
2018	The Outsiders		(final film role)
