= Bai Hua =

Chinese novelist, playwright, and poet (1930–2019)

Chen Youhua
- 陈佑华
- Born: November 20, 1930; Xinyang, Henan, China
- Died: January 15, 2019 (aged 88); Shanghai, China
- Education: Henan Huangchuan High School
- Occupations: Novelist, playwright and poet
- Writing career
- Pen name: Bai Hua
- Language: Chinese
- Period: 1946-2019
- Genres: Novel, play, poem
- Notable work: Portrait of a Fanatic

Chinese name
- Traditional Chinese: 陳佑華
- Simplified Chinese: 陈佑华
Transcriptions
Standard Mandarin
- Hanyu Pinyin: Chén Yòuhuá

Bai Hua
- Traditional Chinese: 白樺
- Simplified Chinese: 白桦
Transcriptions
Standard Mandarin
- Hanyu Pinyin: Bái Huà

Bai Hua (simplified Chinese: 白桦; traditional Chinese: 白樺; pinyin: Bái Huà; 20 November 1930 – 15 January 2019) was a Chinese novelist, playwright and poet. He gained national fame for his plays based on uncompromising historical criticism.

== Early life ==
Bai was born Chen Youhua (陈佑华) in Xinyang, Henan in 1930. His mother was illiterate but able to sing folk songs, which became a lifelong interest for her son. His father, an anti-Japanese activist, was executed by the Japanese by burying him alive in 1938. Bai had a twin brother, Ye Nan (1930–2003), who became a successful movie scriptwriter in the 1980s.

== Career ==
Bai started publishing poems at the age of fifteen. In 1946, he adopted the name Bai Hua ("White Birch"), taking it from a Russian poem. Many of his poems appeared in the Southern Henan Daily. Subsequently, he joined the People's Liberation Army in 1947 and the Chinese Communist Party in 1949. He worked for the Party as a writer specialized in Chinese ethnic minorities, and visited the areas where they lived. From 1952, he was employed by the People's Liberation Army as head of a creative writing group based in Kunming, and worked as secretary of Marshal He Long.

In the mid-1950s, his support of disgraced art critic Hu Feng led him to be investigated and detained for eight months, during which he attempted to commit suicide. Charges against him were dropped in 1956.

He was labeled a "rightist" in 1957, and expelled from the Army and the Party in 1958. He had to work in a factory before being hired as a scriptwriter by Haiyian Film Studios in Shanghai and came back to the army in 1964. He was further marginalized during the Cultural Revolution. After 1976, he was able to publish dramas and novels that were mildly critical of the Cultural Revolution.

He produced several influential dramas and films in the late 1970s and early 1980s. From 1985 to the mid-1990s he was a member of the Shanghai Writers' Association. He was the first intellectual to be denounced again as "rightist" after the Cultural Revolution. His most recent poetry, following a long silence, was published in 2009.

== Unrequited Love ==
Some of his plays were banned because they dealt with the political purges and murders in the Red Army that took place in the 1930s and offered a critical view of traditional patriotic values. Among these the most famous was the film script Unrequited Love (1979), which became a movie by director Peng Ning, The Sun and the People (苦戀, 1980) that was never shown to the public. In 1982, the script was used for the Taiwanese movie Portrait of a Fanatic. In his script, Bai depicted an overseas Chinese painter who returned to China in order to devote his life to his motherland but ended up suffering political persecution and death. The painter's daughter asked her father a highly sensitive question in the film: "You love your motherland, but does the motherland love you?"

The paramount leader Deng Xiaoping was annoyed by Peng Ning's film and personally organized the old guards to launch a political campaign against Bai in the national media for his violation of Deng's political dogma (specifically the leadership of the party). The criticism threatened to become another wave of political prosecution until the General Secretary of the party Hu Yaobang interfered on his behalf. The significance of this episode is that it effectively split the party into two camps. Bai was later allowed to visit Japan and Southeast Asia and delivered public speeches, but his works were generally suppressed. His late epic poem "From Qiu Jin to Lin Zhao" was never published.

== Personal life ==
Bai married Wang Bei, a Chinese actress, and lived in retirement in Shanghai with his wife.

Bai died on 15 January 2019.
