= Monga Yao Hui =

- Also known as: 艋舺燿輝
- Created by: Ma Jin Da; Fei Cheng; Zou Weigang; Linruo Chen; Zheng Yingmin; Chen Xin Yi
- Directed by: Ming Chin-cheng
- Starring: Lee Wei; Michael Zhang; Shara Lin
- Opening theme: "誰公平" (Who's fair) by Lee Wei
- Ending theme: "還愛不夠" (Love not enough) by Lee Wei and Evonne Hsu
- Country of origin: Taiwan
- Original languages: Mandarin; Taiwanese
- No. of episodes: Original air: 73 episodes International: 111 episodes

Production
- Executive producers: Chen Xingguo; Yangsheng Feng
- Producers: Wang Jun; Ma Jin Da
- Editors: Wang Guan; Kang Xi, Wang Qianhe
- Running time: 90~120 minutes

Original release
- Network: CTS
- Release: 12 April – 22 July 2011

Monga Yao Hui (original title: 艋舺燿輝) is a 2011 Taiwanese television series starring Lee Wei and Shara Lin. It tells the story of four childhood friends and the life of gangsters. The production was announced on 11 January 2011, and debut on CTS on April 12, 2011, airing every Monday through Fridays at 8:00pm for two hours. The drama marked the 40th anniversary of CTS in producing drama. It was set to end on July 19 but was extended to July 22 due to problems with its replacement, New My Fair Princess.

Lee Wang Luo was nominated for Best Supporting Actor in 2011 at the 46th Golden Bell Awards

== Plot ==
The story begins about the childhood memories between Chen Yao Hui and his mother, along with his sworn friends, Liu Wen Hao, Xu Fuchen, and Yu Hui Fang. Since in the final episode of the first seasons, Chen Yao Hui lost his memories while taken revenge to the driver who was hired by the gangster group of "Tian Kui" murder his mother on the street. In further episodes, Yao Hui was cheated by the Tian Kui members, saying that the San Lian was the suspect who plan to murder his Yao Hui's mother, until Yao Hui regains their trust, he accept to recruit Tian Kui members to against the leader of San Lian, Jiang Yilang.

Until the semi-final episodes, Yao Hui regains his old memories trying to remember his origins and his true friends. When Yao Hui remembered his personal members was San Lian, Yao Hui plans to become the spy and he believes that he can overthrown the leader of Tian Kui, Liu Jin Bao.

== Cast ==
Actor	Character	Relationships
Lee Wei	Chen Yao Hui	
Shara Lin	Lin Shujun; Haru; Li Xiuqing	
Zhang Xun Jie	Liu Wen Hao	
Li Yunqing	Xu Fuchen	
Liang Youlin	Yu Huifang	
Huang Wen-hsing	Liu Zixian	
Tsai Chen-nan	Liu Jinbao	
Wang Xuan	Cai Xiuping	
Li Luo	Jiang Yilang	
Frankie Huang	Ye Yong Zhi	
Xie Qiong Nuan	陳吳春蘭	
Lin Ruo Ya	Yi Shan	
Zhu Fang Gang	Huang Shiqi	
Yang Ming Wei	Zhuang Zhengguo	
Ya Zi	Qin Tian	
Chen Zhiqiang	Hong Xun	
Xia Jingting	Qin Hao Han	
Chang Qin	Lin Huo-wang	
Chen Qiongmei	Chun hua	
Luo Ting Chen	Cai Qiuxia	
Lee Wang Luo		

== International broadcast ==
Channel	Location	Dates	Times
ntv7	Malaysia	15 August 2011 - 19 January 2012	Mondays to Fridays from 1800 to 1900
