= Black & White Episode I: The Dawn of Assault =

- Theatrical release poster
- Directed by: Tsai Yueh-hsun
- Screenplay by: Kelly Chen; Tsai Yueh-hsun
- Based on: Black & White
- Produced by: Tsai Yueh-Hsun; Yu Hsiao-Hui
- Starring: Mark Chao; Huang Bo; Angelababy
- Cinematography: Mark Lee
- Edited by: Chou Hung-yi
- Music by: Terdsak Janpan
- Production company: Prajna Works Entertainment
- Distributed by: Warner Bros. Pictures
- Release date: January 13, 2012 (Taiwan)
- Running time: 153 minutes
- Country: Taiwan
- Language: Mandarin
- Budget: US$11 million
- Box office: NT$37.6 million (Taipei) ¥89.5 million (Mainland China)

Black & White Episode I: The Dawn of Assault (Chinese: 痞子英雄首部曲：全面開戰) is a 2012 Taiwanese action thriller film directed by Tsai Yueh-hsun. It is a prequel to and based on the television series Black & White (2009).

The film stars Mark Chao as Wu Ying Xiong, reprising his role from the television series, with Huang Bo and Angelababy also starring.

Black & White Episode I: The Dawn of Assault was released on January 13, 2012. A sequel, Black & White: The Dawn of Justice, was released in 2014.

== Premise ==
A brave policeman and a paranoid gangster are forced to team up for 36 hours to resolve a major crisis that could destroy their beloved Harbor City.

== Cast ==
- Mark Chao as Wu Ying Xiong
- Huang Bo as Xu Da-Fu
- Angelababy as Fan Ning
- Terri Kwan as Tu Hsiao-ching
- Leon Dai as Jabar
- Alex To as SIS Captain Ou
- Jack Kao as Yuan
- Ken Lin as Tung
- Dean Fujioka as Li Che-yong
- Dino Acconci
- Julio Acconci
- Lin Yu-chih as Bao
- Fox Hsu as Er Bao
- Hsiu Chieh-kai
- George Wu as Jack
- Matt Wu
- Hsia Ching-ting
- Jason Tsou
- Chien Te-men
- Janine Chang as Lan Hsi-ying (voice)

== Reception ==
The film earned NT$37.6 million at the Taipei box office and ¥89.5 million at the mainland Chinese box office.

On Film Business Asia, Derek Elley gave the film a grade of 3 out of 10 and said: "Taiwan's first action blockbuster is a fiasco, redeemed only by Mainland comic Huang Bo." Taipei Times complemented its action scenes, but criticized its characters and plot lines.
