= Paradise in Service =

2014 film

- Film poster
- Traditional Chinese: 軍中樂園
- Simplified Chinese: 军中乐园
- Hanyu Pinyin: Jūn Zhōng Lèyuán
- Directed by: Doze Niu
- Screenplay by: Doze Niu; Tseng Li-ting
- Produced by: Doze Niu; Huang Chih-ming
- Starring: Ethan Juan; Wan Qian; Chen Jianbin; Ivy Chen
- Cinematography: Charlie Lam
- Edited by: Su Pei-yi; Chen Junhong
- Music by: Cincin Lee
- Production companies: Honto Productions; Atom Cinema
- Release date: 5 September 2014
- Running time: 133 minutes
- Country: Taiwan
- Language: Mandarin

Paradise in Service is a 2014 Taiwanese historical period film directed, co-written and co-produced by Doze Niu. Set in Kinmen in the 1960s and 1970s, the film focuses on Unit 831, a Republic of China Armed Forces military brothel in existence on the island from 1952 to 1990. It was screened in the Panorama section of the 65th Berlin International Film Festival.

== Plot ==
After the Republic of China's army was defeated on the mainland in 1949 in the Chinese Civil War, the Nationalists (led by Chiang Kai Shek) retreated to the Islands along the Taiwan strait, and Taiwan island itself. Chiang Kai Shek called for the restoration of the mainland to "liberate mainland China" and "eliminate the evil communist regime" after they retreated to Taiwan. Kinmen, a key island to ROC to counter-attack the mainland, had heavy troops deployed to it. The story of this movie is based exactly on that. Elements of taking the mainland and political slogans are commonly seen throughout the film. In 1969, physically fit Taiwan native Lo Pao-tai (Ethan Juan) arrives in Kinmen as a new Republic of China Army conscript. He is selected by Sergeant Major Chang Yun-shan (Chen Jianbin) to be part of the 101st Amphibious Reconnaissance Battalion (also known as the Frogmen of the R.O.C. Army) for grueling training, where he underperforms. He helps Chang Yun-shan—an illiterate who twenty years ago was kidnapped by the R.O.C. Army from his Shandong village and forced to leave the mainland—and Chang in turn arranges for his transfer to work in the military brothel known as Unit 831.

Chung Hua-hsing (Wang Po-chieh), a friend of Lo's from back home, works in a damp tunnel and is severely bullied by other soldiers. He eventually escapes with Sasa (Lei Jiexi), a prostitute he likes, and together they try to swim to mainland China. Meanwhile, Chang feels more and more depressed and lonely, and becomes attached to Girl #8, the coquettish Jiao (Ivy Chen). Lo Pao-tai comforts him and offers to write letters for him to his mother. Lo doesn't bother to sleep with the girls since he resolves to save his virginity for his girlfriend back home, but he befriends Girl #7, Nini (Wan Qian), a mysterious but friendly Shanghainese girl who teaches him the guitar. Nini doesn't have many customers because she usually buys tickets out of pocket to meet her daily quota.

Lo accidentally discovers Nini has a son, and is in Unit 831 to work off her sentence after killing her husband. He is unhappy that Nini hasn't told him anything, so he avoids her. But just like him, Nini has also fallen in love. She decides to tell him about her past abusive marriage, and Lo forgives her. One night, she breaks the curfew and takes him to the wheat fields, where they kiss.

Already getting on in years, Chang plans to marry Jiao, get discharged, and open a restaurant in Taiwan. He begins to prepare for their wedding after receiving Jiao's consent. However, Jiao is only using him (and all her other clients) to amass a personal fortune, so she can buy her way out of the brothel. Lo tells her secret to Chang, and Chang furiously confronts her. During the ensuing quarrel, Chang strangles Jiao. Blaming himself for causing Chang to commit murder and his subsequent arrest, Lo is grief-stricken and Nini consoles him.

In 1971, Nini receives a general amnesty and is about to be transferred back to Taiwan. On their last night together, Nini is ready to make love to Lo. But Lo stops, saying he wants to save his virginity for the one he marries. Nini is hurt, but still leaves him the guitar when she departs.

A few years go by. Lo greatly misses Nini, and continues to write her letters but he has no idea where she is. He has already lost his virginity to girls he doesn't care about. Finally, he finishes his service and leaves Unit 831. Unit 831's director Chou Ching-wu (Tuo Yiran) tells him to marry and forget about the brothel.

A pre-credits scene then displays black-and-white scenes of an alternate reality: Lo is married to Nini and they have a young child, Chung and Sasa successfully made it back to the mainland, and Chang opens his dumpling restaurant in Taiwan, having married Jiao and having a baby together.

== Reception ==
Writing for The Hollywood Reporter, Elizabeth Kerr praised the film's technical strength, but criticized the lack of character development with regard to the brothel workers, and described the storyline as a "serviceable tragic romance that shouldn’t be as shallow as it is." The South China Morning Post's Yvonne Teh echoed praise for the film's technical aspects and positively reviewed Juan's performance. In Variety, Maggie Lee opined that the film was "beautifully acted" throughout, and drew attention to the portrayal of supporting characters.

== Cast ==
- Ethan Juan as Lo Pao-tai
- Chen Jianbin as Chang Yun-shan
  - Wang Rui as Chang Yun-shan (teenager)
- Wan Qian as Nini
- Ivy Chen as Jiao
- Wang Po-chieh as Chung Hua-hsing
- Miao Ke-li as A-hsia
- Chen Yi-wen as Colonel Yu
- Tuo Yiran as Chou Ching-wu
- Honduras as Lin Hsin-hung
- Daniel Chen as Che Ta-yung
- Lei Jiexi as Sasa
- Hsu Wan-shan as Yueh-tao
- Liu Kai-chi as Cantonese veteran
- Jag Huang as Training instructor

== Awards and nominations ==
| Award | Category | Name | Result |
|---|---|---|---|
| 51st Golden Horse Awards | Best Supporting Actor | Chen Jianbin | Won |
| 51st Golden Horse Awards | Best Supporting Actress | Wan Qian | Won |
| 51st Golden Horse Awards | Best Supporting Actress | Ivy Chen | Nominated |
| 51st Golden Horse Awards | Best Art Direction | Huang Mei-ching | Nominated |
| 51st Golden Horse Awards | Best Makeup & Costume Design | Fang Chi-lun, Hsu Li-wen, Kao Chia-lin | Nominated |
| 51st Golden Horse Awards | Best Sound Effect | Tu Du-chih | Nominated |
| 34th Hong Kong Film Awards | Best Film From Mainland and Taiwan | | Nominated |
| 9th Asian Film Awards | Best Actor | Ethan Juan | Nominated |
| 9th Asian Film Awards | Best Supporting Actor | Chen Jianbin | Nominated |
| 9th Asian Film Awards | Best Supporting Actress | Wan Qian | Nominated |
| 15th Chinese Film Media Awards | Best Supporting Actor | Chen Jianbin | Won |
| 15th Chinese Film Media Awards | Best Supporting Actress | Wan Qian | Nominated |
