= Mark Chao =

Taiwanese-Canadian actor and model

- 趙又廷
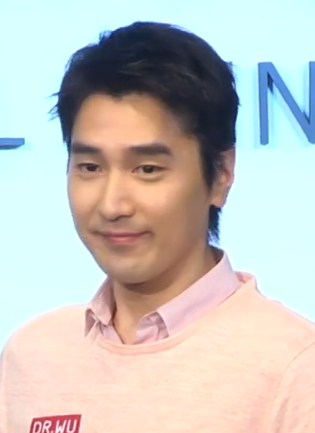
- Chao in 2023
- Born: 25 September 1984 (age 41); Taipei, Taiwan
- Other names: Chao Yu-ting; Zhao Youtíng
- Education: University of Victoria (BA)
- Occupations: Actor; Model
- Years active: 2009–present
- Agent: Easy Entertainment
- Spouse: Gao Yuanyuan (m. 2014)
- Children: Rhea Chao
- Parent: Allen Chao (father)

Chinese name
- Traditional Chinese: 趙又廷
- Simplified Chinese: 赵又廷
Transcriptions
Standard Mandarin
- Hanyu Pinyin: Zhao Yòutíng
Yue: Cantonese
- Jyutping: Ziu6 Jau6 Ting4
Southern Min
- Hokkien POJ: Tiō Iū-têng
- Musical career

Mark Chao (Chinese: 趙又廷; Wade–Giles: Chao Yu-t'ing; Pe̍h-ōe-jī: Tiō Iū-têng, born 25 September 1984) is a Taiwanese-Canadian actor. He made his debut in the television series Black & White (2009), for which he won the Golden Bell Award for Best Actor. After collaborating with director Doze Niu in Monga (2010) and Love (2012), he shifted his career to China, starring in films Caught in the Web (2012), So Young (2013), Young Detective Dee: Rise of the Sea Dragon (2013), Chronicles of the Ghostly Tribe (2015), Her Story (2024) as well as the television series Eternal Love (2017).

Chao ranked 100th on Forbes China Celebrity 100 list in 2011 and 36th in 2017.

== Early life ==
Chao is the son of actor and television host Allen Chao. He graduated from the University of Victoria in Canada, with a double degree in sociology and economics. After he graduated, he started his career in the Taiwanese entertainment industry.

== Career ==
Mark Chao made his debut playing Wu Yingxiong in the television drama Black & White (2009). His role as the rash, righteous and no-nonsense cop shot him to fame and won him the Best Actor award at the 44th Golden Bell Awards. He then starred in his first film, Monga (2010). The gangster flick, directed by Doze Niu, became a critical and commercial success, winning him the Best Newcomer at the Asian Film Awards.

After reuniting with Niu in Love (2012), Chao branched out of Taiwan by starring in First Time opposite Angelababy. He reprised his role of Wu Yingxiong in Black & White Episode I: The Dawn of Assault, the film prequel of Black & White. The same year, he starred opposite Gao Yuanyuan in Caught in the Web directed by Chen Kaige, winning him the Best Actor award for the Hong Kong and Taiwan category at the Huabiao Awards.

Chao then starred in Zhao Wei's directorial debut So Young (2013), playing an ambitious and nerdy China university student. The same year, he played Di Renjie in Young Detective Dee: Rise of the Sea Dragon, directed by Tsui Hark.

Chao once again reprised his role as Wu Yingxiong in Black & White: The Dawn of Justice (2014), the sequel to Black & White Episode I: The Dawn of Assault. He won the Best Actor award at the 16th Huading Awards for his performance.

Chao was then cast to play Hu Bayi in Chronicles of the Ghostly Tribe (2015), adapted from the best-selling tomb raid novel series Ghost Blows Out the Light. The film, directed by Lu Chuan, was a box office hit but received mixed reviews regarding its faithfulness to the novel. The following year, he starred in the Chinese-French film The Warriors Gate, directed by Matthias Hoene.

Chao made his return to television after 8 years in fantasy romance drama Eternal Love (2017). Though Chao's casting as the beautiful male lead was originally met with criticism, he eventually won praise for his acting. After the series aired, he experienced an explosive rise in popularity and increased film offers.

In 2018, Chao starred in the romance film Till the End of the World, which was shot in Antarctica. He is also set to reprise his role in Detective Dee: The Four Heavenly Kings. The same year, Chao was cast in Lou Ye's period drama film Saturday Fiction.

== Personal life ==
From 2009 to 2011, Chao dated his Black & White co-star Ning Chang. They did not acknowledge their relationship until 2014, when they promoted their film Black & White: The Dawn of Justice on talk show Kangsi Coming.

After meeting on the set of Caught in the Web, Chao married Chinese actress Gao Yuanyuan in 2014. They welcomed a daughter, Rhea Chao, in June 2019, one month after announcing that Gao was pregnant.

== Filmography ==
=== Film ===
Year	English title	Chinese title	Role	Ref.
2010	Monga	艋舺	Zhou Yiwen	
2012	Love	愛	Mark Na	
2012	First Time	第一次	Gong Ning / Lu Xia	
2012	Black & White Episode I: The Dawn of Assault	痞子英雄首部曲:全面開戰	Wu Yingxiong	
2012	Caught in the Web	搜索	Yang Shoucheng	
2012	I Love You to Love Me	爱在一起		
2013	So Young	致我們終將逝去的青春	Cheng Xiaozheng	
2013	Young Detective Dee: Rise of the Sea Dragon	狄仁傑之神都龍王	Di Renjie	
2014	Black & White: The Dawn of Justice	痞子英雄之黎明升起	Wu Yingxiong	
2015	Chronicles of the Ghostly Tribe	九层妖塔	Hu Bayi	
2016	The Warriors Gate	勇士之門	Warrior Zhao	
2018	Till the End of the World	南极绝恋	Wu Fuchun	
2018	Detective Dee: The Four Heavenly Kings	狄仁杰之四大天王	Di Renjie	
2019	Saturday Fiction	蘭心大劇院	Tan Na	
2020	The Yin-Yang Master: Dream of Eternity	晴雅集	Qing Ming	
2024	Her Story	好东西	Wang Tiemei's ex-husband	
2025	Resurrection	狂野时代	Commander	

=== Television series ===
Year	English title	Chinese title	Role	Notes
2009	Black & White	痞子英雄	Wu Yingxiong	
2017	Eternal Love	三生三世十里桃花	Ye Hua / Mo Yuan / Zhao Ge	
2017	Midnight Diner	深夜食堂	Customer	Special appearance
2020	Ordinary Glory	平凡的荣耀	Wu Kezhi	
2021	The Ideal City	理想之城	Xia Ming	
2026	Loving Strangers	秋雪漫过的冬天	Jiang Jiaqi	

== Discography ==
Year	English title	Chinese title	Album	Notes
2009	"Rogue Justice"	無賴正義	Black & White OST	with Color Band
2009	"Ruffian and Hero"	痞子英雄	Black & White OST	with Jason Zou
2010	"Tonight Tonight"	—N/a	Monga OST	with Ethan Juan
2012	"Cry Like A Little Child"	哭得像小孩	First Time OST	
2012	"Stand By Me"	—N/a	First Time OST	
2012	"Rock n Roll Man"	—N/a	First Time OST	
2012	"Me and you"	—N/a	First Time OST	
2012	"Little Donkey"	小毛驢	First Time OST	
2012	"We Are Not Opponents"	我們不是對手	First Time OST	

== Awards and nominations ==
Year	Award	Category	Nominated work	Result
2009	44th Golden Bell Awards	Best Actor	Black & White	Won
2010	16th Shanghai Television Festival	Best Actor	Black & White	Nominated
2010	12th Taipei Film Festival	Best Actor	Monga	Nominated
2010	12th Taipei Film Festival	Best New Actor	Monga	Nominated
2010	54th Asia-Pacific Film Festival	Best Actor	Monga	Nominated
2010	5th Asian Film Awards	Best Newcomer	Monga	Won
2011	11th Chinese Film Media Awards	Best New Actor	Monga	Nominated
2013	15th Huabiao Awards	Outstanding Chinese Actor	Caught in the Web	Won
2014	5th China Film Director's Guild Awards	Best Actor	So Young	Nominated
2014	8th Asian Film Awards	Best Supporting Actor	So Young	Nominated
2015	16th Huading Awards	Best Actor	Black & White: The Dawn of Justice	Won
2015	15th Chinese Film Media Awards	Most Anticipated Actor	Black & White: The Dawn of Justice	Nominated
2015	7th China Image Film Festival	Best Actor	Chronicles of the Ghostly Tribe	Won
2017	23rd Shanghai Television Festival	Best Actor	Eternal Love	Nominated
2017	2017 China Quality Television Drama Ceremony	Outstanding Star of the Year	Eternal Love	Won
2021	26th Asian Television Awards	Best Actor in a Leading Role	Ordinary Glory	Won
