= Partners in Crime (2014 film) =

2014 Taiwanese film

- Theatrical release poster
- 共犯
- Directed by: Chang Jung-chi
- Written by: Monica & Shaballe
- Produced by: Wolf Chen; Jacky Pang
- Starring: Wu Chien-ho; Deng Yu-kai; Cheng Kai-yuan
- Cinematography: Yu Kuang-wei
- Edited by: Nyssa Li
- Music by: Wen Tzu-chieh
- Production companies: Double Edge Entertainment; BenQ Entertainment
- Distributed by: Warner Bros. Pictures
- Release dates: 27 June 2014 (Taipei Film Festival); 26 September 2014 (Taiwan)
- Running time: 89 minutes
- Country: Taiwan
- Language: Mandarin

Partners in Crime (Chinese: 共犯; pinyin: Gòngfàn; lit. 'Accomplices') is a 2014 Taiwanese mystery drama film directed by Chang Jung-chi. The film stars Wu Chien-ho, Deng Yu-kai, and Cheng Kai-yuan as three high school students who are drawn together after discovering the body of a classmate who has apparently committed suicide. It premiered at the Taipei Film Festival in the International New Talent Competition on 27 June 2014 and was released theatrically in Taiwan on 26 September 2014.

The film was screened at several international film festivals, including the 2014 Toronto International Film Festival, the 2014 Busan International Film Festival, and the 2014 Tokyo International Film Festival.

== Plot ==
On an ordinary school day, Huang Li-huai (Wu Chien-ho), a lonely teenager who is regularly bullied by his classmates, discovers the body of a girl lying in an alleyway on his way home from school. Two other students from the same high school arrive at the scene almost simultaneously: Lin Yung-chuan (Cheng Kai-yuan), a quiet straight-A student, and Yeh Yi-kai (Deng Yu-kai), a rebellious bad boy. The three boys, who had never met before, learn that the dead girl was Hsia Wei-chiao (Yao Ai-ning), a withdrawn upper-year student whose death is ruled a suicide after she apparently jumped from her fifth-floor apartment.

Brought together by the incident, the three boys form an unlikely friendship and begin investigating Hsia's death on their own, attending her funeral under false pretences and breaking into her apartment to search for clues. Huang discovers a note written by Hsia to a classmate named Chu Ching-yi (Wen Chen-ling) reading "It's all your fault," leading the boys to conclude that Chu bullied Hsia into taking her own life. They devise a plan to take revenge on Chu by luring her into a forest to frighten her.

After carrying out the plan, the three boys celebrate at a lake near the school, where Huang accidentally drowns. Lin flees the scene in a panic, leaving Yeh to face the aftermath alone. Branded a murderer by Huang's vengeful younger sister Huang Yung-chen (Sunny Hung), Yeh is feared and ostracised by the school. As Yeh remains silent about what happened, an unexpected discovery leads him to uncover a tragic secret kept by his deceased friend, revealing that the truth behind both deaths is more complex than anyone had imagined.

== Production ==
Partners in Crime is the second feature film by director Chang Jung-chi, following his critically acclaimed debut Touch of the Light (2012), which won the Golden Horse Award for Best New Director and was selected as Taiwan's submission to the 85th Academy Awards. The screenplay was written by the writing duo Monica & Shaballe (Wu Nu-nu and Xia Pei-er), who had previously collaborated on the film Honey PuPu (2011) and the television drama PS Man (2010). In an interview with the South China Morning Post, Chang described the film as belonging to the detective genre and said that the script, which he did not originate, attracted him because it offered a perspective on youth that was very different from his first film.

The film was produced by Double Edge Entertainment and BenQ Entertainment, with additional involvement from Jet Tone Films (the production company of Hong Kong director Wong Kar-wai) and Fox International Channels. It was shot in widescreen (2.35:1) by cinematographer Yu Kuang-wei, with an atmospheric score by Wen Tzu-chieh, who had also scored Touch of the Light. The sound team included veteran Taiwanese sound designer Du Du-chih. Taiwanese singer-songwriter Cheer Chen and her band The Verse make a cameo appearance in the film as themselves, performing the insert song "Rapid Eye Movement" (快速動眼).

== Release ==
The film premiered at the Taipei Film Festival in the International New Talent Competition on 27 June 2014 and was released in Taiwanese cinemas on 26 September 2014. It subsequently screened at several major international festivals: the 2014 Toronto International Film Festival in the Contemporary World Cinema section (North American premiere), the 19th Busan International Film Festival in the A Window on Asian Cinema section, the 27th Tokyo International Film Festival in the World Focus section, and the 34th Hawaii International Film Festival in the Spotlight on Taiwan section (US premiere). It also screened at the 2015 New York Asian Film Festival as part of the Taiwan Cinema Now! programme. The film was released in Hong Kong on 5 February 2015.

== Reception ==
The film received generally positive reviews from critics. Justin Chang of Variety called it "an artful and absorbing high-school thriller" that works "as a taut, teasing study of loneliness, alienation and the dangerous lure of fantasy," though he noted it felt "stronger on hothouse atmosphere than emotional or psychological depth." Ho Yi of the Taipei Times praised the film's "atmospheric cinematography and tight storytelling," writing that Chang "doesn't seem so much interested in a mystery or a thriller filled with unexpected twists and turns as he is in portraying adolescent angst and loneliness." Derek Elley of Sino-Cinema gave the film a 7 out of 10 rating, noting that it "carves a strong Taiwan personality of its own as well as an adult approach to its subject-matter" and singling out Wu Chien-ho as "especially good as the nerdy dark horse."

== Cast ==
- Wu Chien-ho as Huang Li-huai
- Deng Yu-kai as Yeh Yi-kai
- Cheng Kai-yuan as Lin Yung-chuan
- Yao Ai-ning as Hsia Wei-chiao
- Sunny Hung as Huang Yung-chen
- Wen Chen-ling as Chu Ching-yi
- Ko Chia-yen as School counsellor
- Lee Lieh as Hsia's mother
- Frankie Huang as Police officer
- Vincent Liang as Discipline master
- Huang Tsai-yi as Huang's mother
- Cheer Chen as Singer
