= Half a Loaf of Kung Fu =

1978 Hong Kong film by Chen Chi-hwa

- Original Hong Kong poster

Chinese name
- Traditional Chinese: 一招半式闖江湖
- Simplified Chinese: 一招半式闯江湖
Transcriptions
Standard Mandarin
- Hanyu Pinyin: Yī Zhāo Bàn Shì Chuǎng Jiāng Hú
Yue: Cantonese
- Jyutping: Jat1 Ziu1 Bun3 Sik1 Cong2 Gong1 Wu4
- Directed by: Chen Chi-hwa
- Written by: Jackie Chan; Tang Ming-chi
- Produced by: Lo Wei; Hsu Li-hwa
- Starring: Jackie Chan; Dean Shek; James Tien; Doris Lung; Wu Ma
- Cinematography: Chen Chin-kui
- Edited by: Leong Wing-chan
- Music by: Frankie Chan; Tomita Isao; Winston Sharples; Sammy Lerner (Popeye theme song)
- Distributed by: Lo Wei Motion Picture Company
- Release date: 1 July 1978
- Running time: 98 minutes
- Country: Hong Kong
- Language: Cantonese
- Box office: US$8.3 million (East Asia); 49,652 tickets (France)

Half a Loaf of Kung Fu (Chinese: 一招半式闖江湖) is a 1978 Hong Kong martial arts film directed by Chen Chi-hwa, and starring Jackie Chan, who also wrote the screenplay with Tang Ming-chi. The film co-stars Dean Shek, James Tien, Doris Lung, and Wu Ma. The film was released theatrically in Hong Kong on 1 July 1978. Chan plays a bumbling kung fu student who becomes involved in a series of adventures in one of his first forays into the kung fu acrobatic slapstick comedy style that would become his signature.

In the film, the martial arts student is caught spying on an evil witch. He is later attacked by the witch, but is rescued by his next kung fu teacher. The film is a parody of the stoic depictions of martial artists in "serious" martial arts films.

== Plot ==
A bumbling long-haired acrobat named Jiang desires to practice kung fu. He finds an advertisement for work at the Mansion as a body guard. Jiang does not get the body guard position, but cons his way into a job using his kung fu skills, and gets himself into the middle of some shady business.

Jiang is told not to go near the "guest room" where the special guest is staying. A fellow employee tells Jiang that there is an evil witch who lives in the guest room and is not to be disturbed. Jiang of course is caught spying on her and is run off the land.

He then encounters two kung fu masters fighting in the woods. He watches one kill the other, and when he leaves Jiang takes the body into town to collect the reward. Using the money from the reward, Jiang tries to fulfill his kung fu dreams and find a master. He is suddenly attacked by the crazy witch and is about to lose until a mystery master shows up and beats her. The master turns out to be a bum, and teaches Jiang kung fu. He then goes on a journey with a princess to find a special jade plant.

== Cast ==
- Jackie Chan as Jiang
- Dean Shek as Man with cane
- James Tien as Master Mao
- Doris Lung as Fung's daughter
- Wu Ma as Urinating man
- Kam Kong as Ying Fu
- Kim Jeong-nan as Miss Lu
- Ma Ju-lung
- Miao Tian as Mr. Wan
- Lo Chao-hsiung
- Julie Lee as Snake woman
- Lee Man-tai as Old beggar
- Ko Keung as Man wearing a gold cap
- Kam Sai-yuk as Man wearing leopard skin
- Chiang Chi-ping
- Chui Yuen
- Miu Tak-san
- Ho Kong
- Yu Bong
- Li Min-lang as Man fighting with Whip Hero
- Wong Yiu
- Lam Kwong-wing
- Woo Hon-cheung
- Yeung Lit
- Che Tei
- Chan Kam-chu
- Man Lee-pang
- Lam Man-cheung
- Peng Kong

== Box office ==
In Hong Kong, the film grossed HK$1,526,871.50 (US$326,255) upon release in 1978. In Japan, it was the 16th highest-grossing film of 1983, earning ¥1.89 billion (US$7.96 million). Combined, the film grossed a total of US$8,286,255 (equivalent to $41,000,000 in 2025) in East Asia.

Originally made in Hong Kong in 1978, Half a Loaf of Kung Fu was released in the U.S. in 1985. In France, the film sold 49,652 tickets upon release there in 1987.

== Reception ==
Silver Emulsion Film Reviews says, Half a Loaf of Kung Fu is not a traditional kung fu film, it is an active attempt to parody and make light of the stoic seriousness that the genre is generally built upon.

== See also ==
- Jackie Chan filmography
- List of Hong Kong films
- List of martial arts films
