= Wan Qian =

Chinese actress and singer

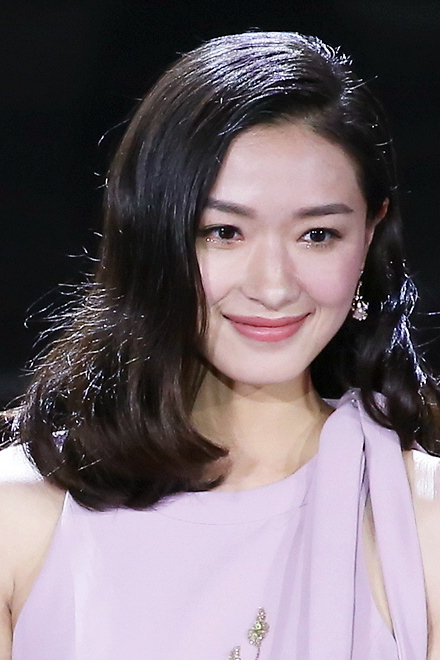
- Wan in 2017
- Born: 14 May 1982 (age 44); Yiyang, Hunan, China
- Other name: Regina Wan
- Education: Shanghai Theatre Academy
- Occupations: Actress; singer
- Years active: 2002–present
- Agent: Beijing Sheng Yi Entertainment Co. Ltd.
- Children: 1

Chinese name
- Traditional Chinese: 萬茜
- Simplified Chinese: 万茜
Transcriptions
Standard Mandarin
- Hanyu Pinyin: Wàn Qiàn
- Musical career
- Genres: Mandopop

Wan Qian (Chinese: 万茜, born 14 May 1982), also known as Regina Wan, is a Chinese actress and singer. She won Golden Horse Award for Best Supporting Actress for the 2014 Taiwanese film Paradise in Service and the Beijing College Student Film Festival for Best Actress for the 2016 film The Insanity. In 2025, she won Golden Goblet Award for Best Actress at the 27th Shanghai International Film Festival for her performance in the film Wild Nights, Tamed Beasts.

== Early life ==
Wan Qian was born in Heshan District, Yiyang, Hunan. She was heavily influenced by her father when she was young. During her childhood, her father always took her to practice vocally, cultivating her love of singing.

A haphazard chance made her enroll into the acting undergraduate program at the Shanghai Theatre Academy (STA). During her student life at the Shanghai Theatre Academy, she represented STA as the leading actress to join the international theatre festivals that were held in Romania, Hong Kong and the United States. After graduation, she was recruited into a record company in Beijing.

== Personal life ==
On 9 November 2017, Wan Qian gave birth to her daughter in Shanghai. She also posted a short video on Weibo and officially announced it on 10 November 2017.

== Filmography ==
=== Film ===
Year	English title	Chinese title	Role	Notes/Ref.
2008	Butterfly Lovers	剑蝶		
2012	Threads of Time	柳如是	Liu Rushi	
2013	Christmas Rose	圣诞玫瑰	Megan	
2013	Paradise in Service	军中乐园	Ni Ni	
2015	The Laundryman	青田街一号	Lin Xiang	
2016	Hide & Seek	捉迷藏	Ping Zhi	
2016	The Insanity	你好，疯子	An Xi	
2017	God of War	荡寇风云	Lady Qi	
2017	Guilty of Mind	心理罪	Qiao Lan	
2019	The Wild Goose Lake	南方车站的聚会	Yang Shujun	
2019	Youthful China in the Headlines	头条里的青春中国		Short film
2021	Endgame	人潮汹涌	Li Xiang (李想)	

=== Television series ===
Year	English title	Chinese title	Role	Notes/Ref.
2002		金锁记	Juan'er	
2005	An Angel's Voice	天使的歌声	Chen Ziwei	
2005	Secret Order 1949	密令1949	Yang Liu	
2007	Justice Department 2	青天衙门II伏魔录	Tan Xiaoyu	
2008		长江一号	Xu Mianchu	
2009	Goddess of Mercy	观世音之观音妙缘	Tian Suzhen	
2009		浴血记者	Fan Xiaoyun	
2010	Shanghai Shanghai	上海上海	Liu Xiaonan	
2010	My Children, My Home	我的孩子我的家	Lin Yuhong	
2010	Bridge of Life & Death	生死桥	Yin Biting	
2011	Naked Wedding	裸婚时代	Chen Jiaojiao	
2012	King for Legend	传奇之王	Jian Ping	
2012	If I Really	假如我是真的	Qian Xiaosui	
2012	The Family and Love	儿女情更长	Zhang Qian	
2012	Before Decisive Battle	决战前	Feng Yufei	
2012	Home, Sweet Home	我家有喜	Bai Muxi	
2013	The Sweet Burden	小儿难养	Jian Ai	
2013	Flowers in Fog	花非花雾非雾	Bai Haihua	
2013	Phoenix Nirvana	我是特种兵之火凤凰	An Ran	
2014	War of Marriage	婚战	Hai Lan	
2014	Ten Rides of Red Army	十送红军	Dai Lan	
2014	The Children Came Home	孩子回国了	Zhang Jiachao	
2015	Say No for Youth	天生要完美	Jiang Danchen	
2016	To Be a Better Man	好先生	Xu Li	Guest appearance
2016	128 Incident	铁血淞沪	Zhou Huping	
2017	Mature Male Develop a Mind	熟男养成记	Shen Yutong	
2017	The Perfect Couple	将婚姻进行到底	Jiang Yifan	
2017	The Glory of Tang Dynasty	大唐荣耀	Dugu Jingyao	
2017	Game of Hunting	猎场	Neng Chunxiong	
2017	Tribes and Empires: Storm of Prophecy	海上牧云记	Nangu Yueli	Special appearance
2018	Secret of the Three Kingdoms	三国机密	Fu Shou	
2018	Lost in 1949	脱身	Huang Liwen	
2020	New World	新世界	Tian Dan	
2020	Young Army Officers	尉官正年轻	Xu Bing	
2020	The Twelfth Second	第十二秒	Hu Jiaying / Xu Han	
2020	The Investigator	商业调查师	Jian Xin	
2024	The Tale of Rose	玫瑰的故事	Su Gengsheng	
2024	The People's Police	人民警察	An Ping	

=== Variety show ===
Year	English title	Chinese title	Role	Notes/Ref.
2020	Sisters Who Make Waves	乘风破浪的姐姐	Cast member	
2020	Lady Land	姐姐的爱乐之程	cast member	

== Discography ==
=== Albums ===
Year	English title	Chinese title	Notes/Ref.
2007	Universal Gratification	万有引力	
2010	Thousand of Words	万语千言	

=== Singles ===
Year	English title	Chinese title	Album	Notes/Ref.
2014	"River of No Return"		Paradise in Service OST	
2016	"Gift"	礼物	The Insanity OST	
2017	"Step Aside for You"	为你成全	The Glory of Tang Dynasty OST	with Li Nan

== Awards and nominations ==
Year	Award	Category	Nominated work	Results	Ref.
2014	51st Golden Horse Awards	Best Supporting Actress	Paradise in Service	Won	
2015	9th Asian Film Awards	Best Supporting Actress	Paradise in Service	Nominated	
2015	15th Chinese Film Media Awards	Best Supporting Actress	Paradise in Service	Nominated	
2017	23rd Beijing Student Film Festival	Best Actress	The Insanity	Won	
2017	8th China Film Director's Guild Awards	Best Actress	The Insanity	Nominated	
2018	24th Shanghai Television Festival	Best Supporting Actress	Game of Hunting	Nominated	
2018	24th Huading Awards	Best Supporting Actress	Game of Hunting	Nominated	
2018	5th The Actors of China Award Ceremony	Outstanding Actress (Sapphire category)	—N/a	Won	
2019	25th Shanghai Television Festival	Best Actress	Lost in 1949	Nominated	
2019	17th Golden Phoenix Awards	Society Award	The Insanity	Won	
2020	Forbes	China Celebrity 100 list	—N/a	98th	
2020	27th Huading Awards	Best Supporting Actress	The Wild Goose Lake	Nominated	
2023	14th Macau International Television Festival	Best Actress	Lady's Character	Nominated	
2023	36th Golden Rooster Awards	Best Supporting Actress	Study Dad	Nominated	
2025	27th Shanghai International Film Festival	Golden Goblet Award for Best Actress	Wild Nights, Tamed Beasts	Won	
2025	30th Shanghai Television Festival	Best Supporting Actress	The Tale of Rose	Nominated	
