= Doze Niu =

Taiwanese actor, director and producer

- 鈕承澤
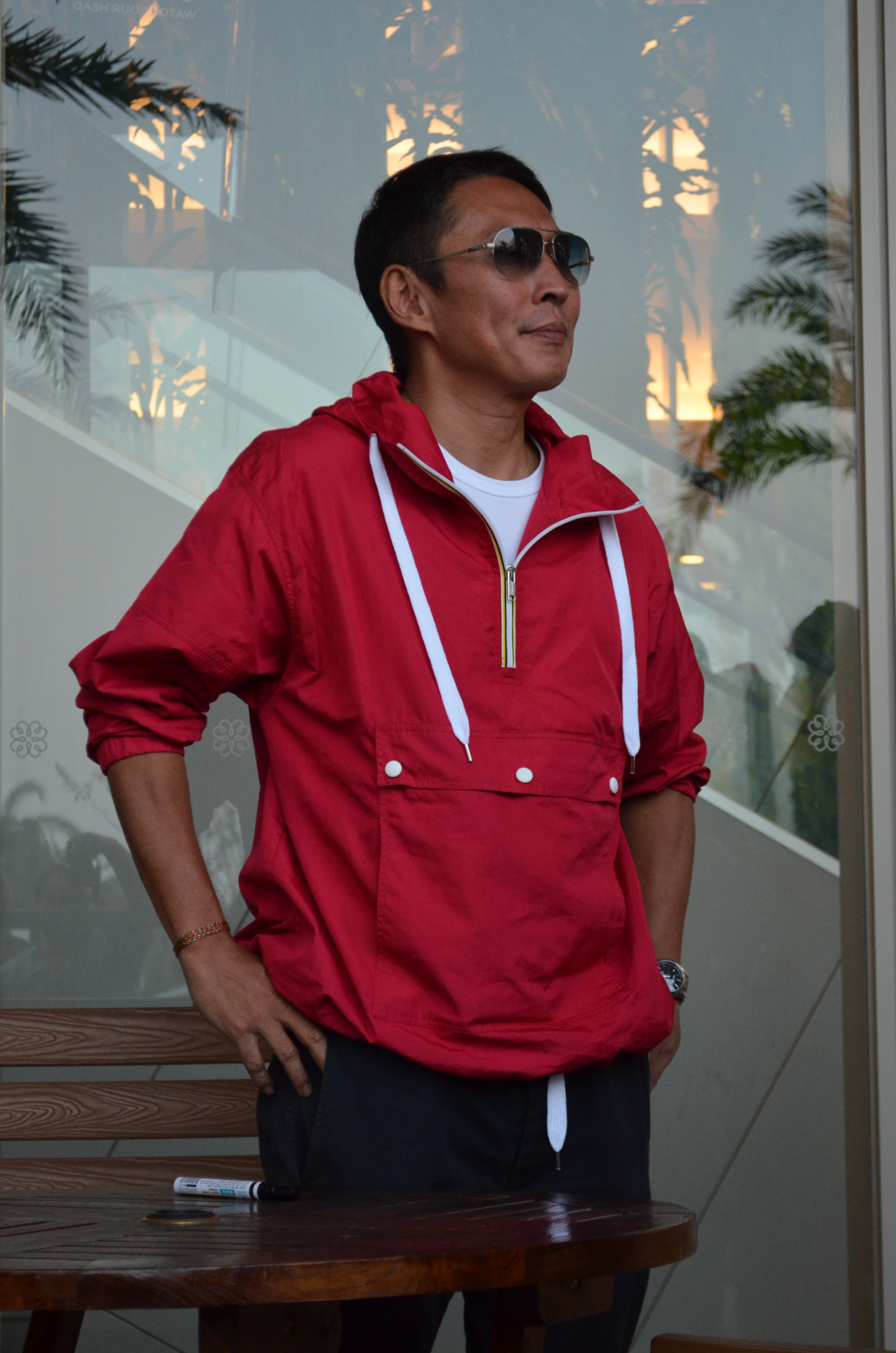
- Niu in 2014
- Born: Niu Chen-zer; June 22, 1966 (age 60); Taipei, Taiwan
- Education: National Taiwan College of Performing Arts
- Occupations: Film director; producer; screenwriter; actor; show host
- Parents: Niu Hua; Zhang Qingqin

Doze Niu (Chinese: 鈕承澤; pinyin: Niǔ Chéngzé; Wade–Giles: Niu Ch'eng-tse; Pe̍h-ōe-jī: Liú Sêng-te̍k, also known as Niu Chen-zer; born June 22, 1966) is a Taiwanese actor and filmmaker, known for Monga (2010), Love (2012), Paradise in Service (2014).

== Early life ==
Niu was born in Taipei, Taiwan on June 22, 1966. He grew up in the military dependents' village in Gongguan, Taipei. His paternal family is from the Manchu Niohuru clan and his maternal family has military background. His grandfather was a general, so he would often accompany him to visit Chiang Kai-shek. When he was 12, his father was diagnosed with amyotrophic lateral sclerosis and became bed-ridden for 25 years until his death.

== Career ==
Niu started acting at the age of 9. In 1983, at 17, he was nominated for the Golden Horse Award for Growing Up. These early successes did not help his career as he grew older. At 19, unable to find film roles, Niu began associating with local gangsters, through whom he also improved his Taiwanese Hokkien.

Niu founded production company Red Bean Production Co in August 2002. He was originally slated to direct the film Pao Ma, which has been abandoned since 2021, when Niu was sentenced to prison in Hualien County for 4 years. He was released in January 2025.

== Controversies ==
=== Carrier intrusion ===
In June 2013, he brought Chinese cinematographer Cao Yu into the Navy base in Zhuoying under a false name. The incident was revealed by their photo together on an aircraft carrier. These actions violated certain laws of the Ministry of National Defense. The Navy command investigated it as possible intrusion, which can carry a five-year sentence. On July 16, 2013, Niu admitted his wrongdoing in the court in Kaoshiong and paid NT$200,000 for bail. He told the media that he did not know he broke the law.

=== Sexual assault conviction ===
On 5 December 2018, a female crew member on the set of Pao Ma filed a police report accusing Niu of sexually assaulting her the previous month. He was subsequently questioned by police officers of the Da'an Precinct and the Taipei District Prosecutors Office, and was indicted in January 2019. Niu was formally charged with rape in February 2019. An appeal to the Taiwan High Court was heard in April 2020, and he was sentenced to four years imprisonment. The High Court ruling was upheld as the Supreme Court rejected Niu's appeal in September 2021.

== Features ==
=== What on Earth Have I Done Wrong?! ===
What on Earth Have I Done Wrong is the first dramatic film that Niu directed. He was also the main actor. Although the movie is not an autobiography, there are a lot of resemblances between him and the character. The character in the movie is also a director attempting to gather enough money to produce a mockumentary film. The film was initially about the politics in Taiwan; however, Niu took a completely different turn with the film and focused the film on the character. A lot of media commented that this film is a half-biography or a documentary. The film was nominated for the best picture award at the Golden Horse Film Festival and it won the FIPRESCI Prize.

=== Monga ===
Monga is a gangster movie that takes place in the Wanhua District of Taipei and has a cast of mainly young actors like Mark Chao and Ethan Juan. Niu also participated in the movie as the head of the gang from the mainland China. The movie was a box office success, grossing more than US$1.8 million in Taiwan.

The film was selected as the Taiwanese entry for the Best Foreign Language Film at the 83rd Academy Awards.

== Filmography ==
=== Film ===
Year	English title	Original title	Role	Notes
1975	A Misty Love	小雨絲絲		
1979	Love Be Forever	我們永遠在一起		
1979	Gone with Honor	香火		
1980	The Story of Daniel Kelly	丹尼爾的故事		
1982	Portrait of a Fanatic	苦戀	Ling Chenguang (teen)	
1983	Growing Up	小畢的故事	Bi Chujia (teen)	
1983	March On to the Troops	小畢從軍去	Bi Chujia (teen)	spin-off sequel to Growing Up
1983	The Boys from Fengkuei	風櫃來的人	Ah Ching	
1983	Sex Education	國中十四章	Tung Ah-lung	
1984	Ann Ann	安安		
1985	Beautiful Men of the Tang Dynasty	唐朝綺麗男	Cui Junnan	
1985	The Sight of Father's Back	背影		
1985	The Youth in the Mud	泥巴中的少年		
1985	The Young Ba Jia Jiang	少年八家將		
1986	The Kinmen Bombs	八二三炮戰	Trumpet	
1987	Yes, Sir!	報告班長		
1987	Pretty Girl	芳草碧連天		
1987	Ah Zhe's Brothers	阿哲的兄弟		
1987	The Game They Called Sex	黃色故事		
1987	Listen to Me	我有話要說		
1989	Banana Paradise	香蕉天堂	Weng Men-shuan	
1990	Young Soldier	少爺當大兵		
1996	Accidental Legend	飛天	Lame Uncle	
1997	Island of Greed	黑金	Ni Chien-kuo	
1997	Rainy Dog	極道黒社会	Sunday	
1998	The Personals	徵婚啓事	himself	
1999	March of Happiness	天馬茶房	Xiao Bao	
1999	Red Rain	驚天動地		
2000	A Chance to Die	想死趁現在		
2000	Hidden Whisper	小百無禁忌	Xiao Bai's boyfriend	
2000	Xiaoguang	曉光	Ma Xiaoguang	TV film, also director and producer
2001	Millennium Mambo	千禧曼波	Doze	
2007	What on Earth Have I Done Wrong?!	情非得已之生存之道	himself	also director, co-producer and co-writer
2010	Monga	艋舺	Grey Wolf	also director, co-producer and co-writer
2011	Kora	轉山	cyclist pal	
2012	Love	愛	Mr. Lu	also director, co-producer and co-writer
2014	Paradise in Service	軍中樂園		director, co-producer and co-writer
2017	Fist & Faith	青禾男高		producer

=== Television ===
Year	English title	Chinese title	Role	Notes
1987	After the Game	遊戲之後		
1989	Awakening	甦醒		
1992	No Regrets This Life	今生無悔	Zhou Xiangui	
1993	Justice Pao	包青天	Pang Yu and multiple other roles	
1994	The Seven Heroes and Five Gallants	七俠五義	Li Yuhou	
1996	Taiwan Paranormal Events	臺灣靈異事件		unrelated characters
1997	Tiger's Tenderness	老虎的溫柔		
1997	Love Is Payable	儂本多情	Da Mi	
1997	Ordinary Men and Women	凡夫俗女		
1997	Sex Scandal Crisis	桃色危機		
1997	The Strange Cases of Lord Shi	施公奇案	Zhou Tong	
1998	The Kingdom and the Beauty	江山美人	Liu Shengxue	
1998	Track	軌跡		
1998	Dahan	大寒		
1998	Once	曾經		
1999	Taiwan's Liao Tianding	台灣廖添丁	Asano	
1999	Hua Mulan	花木蘭	Zhang Xi	
2000	Sunny Piggy	春光燦爛豬八戒	Ao Shun	
2001	Story of a Stone	石頭的故事		
2001	Toast Boy's Kiss	吐司男之吻	Li Xiong	also director
2004	Say Yes Enterprise	求婚事務所	Li Yilong	also director
2004	From Africa, Coming Back	安室愛美惠		sitcom
2007	My Lucky Star	放羊的星星	bar owner	
2007	Wayward Kenting	我在墾丁×天氣晴	Chu Yiyang	also director and co-producer

== Music video directions ==
Niu directed music videos for Richie Ren Xian-QI's "wu ni jiu wu wo" and Jasmine Leong's "di san zhe".

== Awards and nominations ==
- Growing Up (小畢的故事) 1983 Golden Horse Film Festival best supporting actor nomination
- 1984 China Art Film Performance Award Medal
- After the game (遊戲之後) 1987 Golden Bell Award best actor nomination
- Awakening (甦醒) 1989 Golden Bell Award best actor nomination
- Banana Paradise (香蕉天堂) 1989 Golden Horse Film Festival best actor nomination
- Fei Tian (飛天) 1996 Golden Horse Film Festival best supporting actor nomination
- Xiaoguang (曉光) 2000 Golden Bell Award best actor nomination
- What on Earth have I done wrong?! (情非得已之生存之道) 2007 Golden Horse Film Festival FIPRESCI Prize
- Wayward Kenting (我在墾丁*天氣晴) 2008 Golden Bell Award drama director award nomination

== See also ==
- Manchu people in Taiwan
