= Shara Lin =

Taiwanese musician, actress, singer, and television host

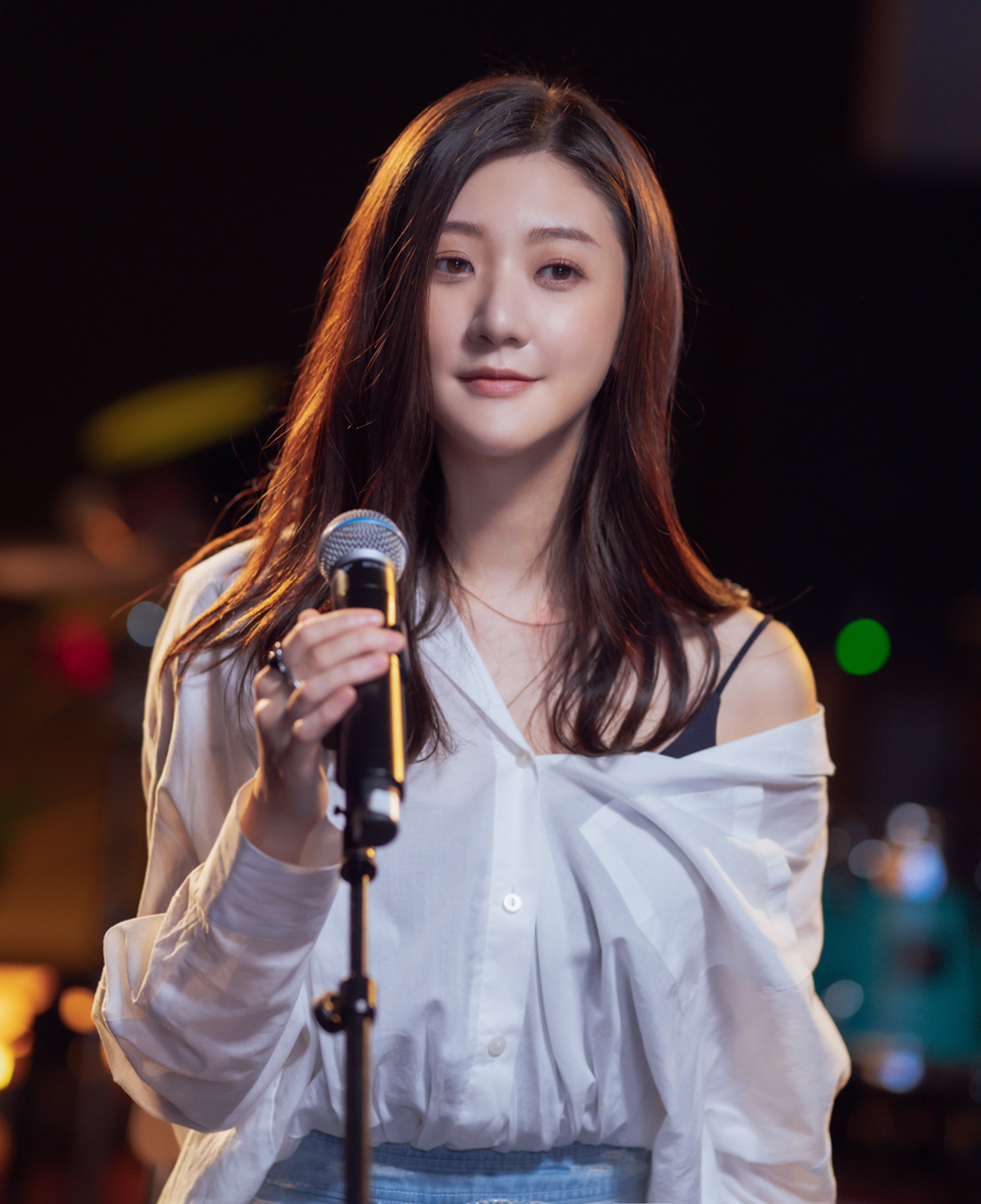
- Lin in September 2022
- Born: 5 November 1985 (age 40); West Central, Tainan, Taiwan
- Education: National Taiwan Normal University
- Occupations: Actress, singer, television host
- Years active: 2005-present

Chinese name
- Chinese: 林逸欣
Transcriptions
Standard Mandarin
- Hanyu Pinyin: Lín Yìxīn
- Musical career
- Also known as: Lin Yixin
- Labels: EMI Music (2017-present); Enjoy Music (2009-2016)

Shara Lin Yi-hsin (born 5 November 1985) is a Taiwanese musician, actress, singer, and television host. She plays mainly violin and piano, but also guzheng and guitar; she is a polyglot (Chinese, English, Taiwanese, Filipino, Korean and Japanese).

== Career ==
At the age of six, Lin played in her first movie. As a violinist, she won at age 12 a first place award in an international competition in Japan. Later, she made her first starring role in the film Summer Times (Chinese: 夏天協奏曲; lit. 'Summer Concerto').

== Filmography ==
=== Films ===
- Summer Times (2009)
- Monga (2011)
- I Love You So Much (2012)
- Piano Trojan (2013)
- A Good Wife 親愛的，我愛上別人了(2013)
- Peace in Love (2014)
- First Kiss (2014)

Year	English title	Mandarin title	Role	Notes
2009	Summer Times	夏天協奏曲	Chen Wen-ching / Chen Wen-ching (Twin sisters)	
2009	Sun flowers	向日葵	Su Hsiao-lin	
2013	Piano Trojan	鋼琴木馬	Li Ching-tzu	
2013	Face Blindness	阿喜的採訪手札	Lin Yi-hsin	Short film
2013	Sail the Sea	航向大海	Lin Hsiao-mi	Short film
2014	Peace In Love	痞子遇到愛	Ouyang Ching	
2015	Calling for You	呼叫少年	Lin Chia-fen	Short film
2016	Close to you	靠近	Li Ying-ju	TV movie

=== Television series ===
Year	English title	Mandarin title	Role	Notes
2011	Monga Yao Hui	艋舺燿輝	Lin Shujun Li Xiuqing Haru	
2012	I Love You So Much	粉愛粉愛你	Cola Wen Hsi	
2013	Blissful Dandelion	幸福蒲公英	Wang Sze-Yu	
2013	A Good Wife	親愛的，我愛上別人了	Han Hsiang-Chi	
2015	Lonely Gourmet Taipei	孤獨的美食家	Lan Xiao Ben	
2015	Moon River	明若曉溪	Coco	
2016	Better Man	我的極品男友	Wu Yi-an	
2017	Taste of Life	甘味人生	Kai-shen	
2018	Meet Me @ 1006	1006的房客	Chen Fan	
2019	The Way We Love	男神時代	Wang Queenie	
2019	A Thousand Goodnights	一千個晚安	Cheng Shan	
2019	Endless Love	天堂的微笑	Han Fang-Ting	
2022	Plus and Minus	正負之間	Nikita	
