= What on Earth Have I Done Wrong?! =

- Film poster
- Chinese: 情非得已之生存之道
- Literal meaning: Involuntary Emotions: The Tao of Survival
- Hanyu Pinyin: Qíng Fēi Dé Yǐ zhī Shēngcún zhī Dào
- Directed by: Doze Niu
- Screenplay by: Doze Niu; Tseng Li-ting; Tsai Tsung-han
- Produced by: Doze Niu; Huang Chih-ming
- Starring: Doze Niu; Janine Chang
- Cinematography: Chou Yi-wen
- Edited by: Su Pei-yi; Tseng Li-ting
- Music by: Mavis Fan
- Production company: Honto Productions
- Release dates: December 2, 2007 (Golden Horse Film Festival); April 11, 2008 (Taiwan)
- Running time: 96 minutes
- Country: Taiwan
- Language: Mandarin

What on Earth Have I Done Wrong?! is a 2007 Taiwanese comedy film directed, co-written, and co-produced by Doze Niu, starring himself as struggling film director-producer "Doze Niu", in his feature film debut. Billed as "an honest outlook inside Doze Niu's life and Taiwan's entertainment industry", the low-budget mockumentary was shot mainly home movie-style with little background music. Most of the actors portrayed themselves (or at least satirized versions).

== Cast ==
- Doze Niu as Doze Niu, film director and owner of the film studio Honto Productions
- Janine Chang as Ningning, actress and Niu's live-in girlfriend
- Ke Huan-ru as Huan-ru, actress and Ningning's best friend
- Chang Ching-chin as Doze Niu's mother (Chang is Niu's real-life mother)
- Tsai Hsin-hung as Hsin-hung (Tsai was also the executive producer of this film)
- Megan Lin as Megan (Lin was also art director of this film)
- Tsang Shu-pei as Pei (Tsang was also editor and production assistant of this film)
- Lien Yi-chi as Lien (Lien was also production coordinator of this film)
- Ke Yi-sen as Yi-sen (Ke was also script supervisor of this film)
- Chen Hsi-sheng as Hsi-sheng
- Lee Ying-yi as Ying-yi
- Wu Kuei-chun as Wu Kuei-chun, a.k.a. "Turtle", mob boss
- Amy Lee as Amy Lee, therapist
- Lin Yi-hao as President Tsai, rich guy
- Ding Ning as Ding Ning, actress
- Wang Li-jen as Wang Li-jen, actress
- Chu Zhong-heng as Chu Zhong-heng, actor
- Xiu Jie-kai as Xiu Jie-kai, actor
- Chiu Yi as himself
- Ella Chen (cameo)
- Dee Hsu (cameo)
- Kevin Tsai (cameo)
- Joe Cheng (cameo)
- Luo Wen-jia (cameo)

== Awards and nominations ==
2007 Golden Horse Film Festival and Awards

- Won—FIPRESCI Prize
- Nominated—Best Feature Film
- Nominated—Best Supporting Actress (Janine Chang)

2008 Rotterdam International Film Festival

- Won—Netpac Award

2008 Taipei Film Festival

- Won—Best Actor (Doze Niu)
- Won—Best Actress (Janine Chang)
- Won—Audience Award
- Nominated—Festival Grand Prize
