= Black & White (TV series) =

- Promotional poster for Black & White
- Also known as: 痞子英雄
- Genre: police drama, action
- Written by: Wu Luo Ying (吳絡纓), Chen Hui Ru (陳慧如)
- Directed by: Cai Yuexun (蔡岳勳)
- Starring: Vic Chou; Mark Chao; Ivy Chen; Janine Chang
- Opening theme: "無賴正義" (Rogue Justice) by CoLoR and Mark Chao
- Ending theme: "Perfect Stranger" by Jason (鄒承恩)
- Country of origin: Taiwan
- Original language: Mandarin
- No. of episodes: 24

Production
- Producers: Yu Xiao Hui (于小惠); Cai Yuexun (蔡岳勳)
- Production locations: Kaohsiung, Taiwan
- Production company: Prajna Works

Original release
- Network: Public Television Service (PTS)
- Release: 11 April – 27 June 2009

Black & White (Chinese: 痞子英雄) is a 2009 Taiwanese drama starring Vic Chou, Mark Chao, Ivy Chen and Janine Chang. It was produced by Prajna Works and directed by Cai Yuexun (蔡岳勳) with location filming in Kaohsiung, Taiwan.

The series was first broadcast in Taiwan on free-to-air Public Television Service (PTS) (公視) from 11 April 2009 to 27 June 2009 and on satellite TV channel TVBS Joy Channel, from 18 April 2009 to 3 July 2009.

The drama was nominated in 2009 for 11 awards at the 44th annual Golden Bell Awards, winning 5: Best Television Series, Best Actor for Mark Chao, Best Directing for a Television Series for Cai Yuexun, Best Art and Design for a Television Series, and Best Marketing Program.

Two prequel films centering around Chao's character, titled Black & White Episode I: The Dawn of Assault and Black & White: The Dawn of Justice, were released in 2012 and 2014 respectively.

== Cast ==
- Vic Chou as Shrek (Pi Zi) 陳在天 (南區分局長)
- Mark Chao as Wu Ying Xiong (吳英雄)
- Janine Chang as Lan Xi Ying (藍西英)
- Allen Chao as South District Director (南區分局長)
- Tang Zhi Wei as Chen Jun Lin (陳俊麟)
- Chien Te-men as Li Jian Guo (Lao Li) 李建國 (老李)
- Hong Chen Ying (洪晨穎) as Ai Lu (Xiao Lu) 艾綠 (小綠)
- Hank Wu as Hao Ke (浩克)
- Chen You Fang as Ling Wen Qi (凌文琦)
- Chin Shih-chieh as Shi Yong Guang (石永光)
- Zhang Fu Jian as Fan Tian Cheng (范天誠)
- Sonia Sui as Lei Mu Sha (雷慕莎)
- Tao Chuan Zheng as Defense secretary
- Kao Ying Hsuan as Senator's assistant
- Jag Huang as Wu Yang (吳洋)
- Fan Kuang-yao as Sergeant Huang
- Zhou Kai Wen (周凱文) as Detective
- Chang Han as Detective
- Lin Jia You (林家佑) as Detective
- Che Guan Cheng (車冠成) as Detective
- Huang Lu Wen (黃綠文) as Forensic Specialist
- Lai Zhen Ze (賴震澤) as Forensic Specialist
- Lin Yi Qian (林伊蒨) as Police
- Tang Zhen (唐臻) as Police
- Qiu Rong Sheng (丘瑢升) as Lieutenant
- Xu Bo Qiang (許柏強) as Uniformed police
- Lin Ju Xian (林均憲) as Uniformed police

SanLianHui

- Ivy Chen as Chen Lin 陳琳
- Paul Chun as Lao Tou 老頭
- Na Wei Xun as Du Wen Yan 杜文雁
- Tang Guo Zhong (唐國忠) as Che Jin 車進

Others in SanLianHui

- Kurt Chou as A Tang 阿唐
- Kageyama Yukihiko (蔭山征彥) as A De 阿得
- Derrick Chang as An Zai 安仔
- Liu Kai Rong (劉開容) as An's brother
- Bu Xue Liang as Logistics manager
- Huang Tai An
- Wu Xiang Zhen(吳翔震)
- Huang Ding Jun (黃鼎鈞)
- Cheng Bo Ren(陳柏仁)
- Wu ming Lun (吳明倫)
- Shao Fu (少甫)
- Zheng Wen Hong (鄭文宏)
- Zou Zhong Xian (鄒仲賢)
- Liu Yi Ru (劉翼儒)
- Li Wei De (李威得)

Other Lawless

- Kingone Wang as Gao Yi 高義
- Irene Hsu as Cheng Yuan 程願
- Jason Zou as Cheng Nuo 程諾

Sarkozy

- Jimmy Hung (洪天祥) as BOSS
- Huang Wen Xuan as P
- Benji as G
- Eric as F
- Yang Xiu Wen (楊琇雯) as K
- Ou Si Ka (奧斯卡) as O
- A Liang as M

The Civilians

- Xiu Jie Kai as Ma Xiao Ming 馬小明 / Huang Shi Kai 黃世楷 / Q
- Reen Yu as He Xiao Mei 何小玫
- Patina Lin as Ling Ke Le 凌可樂
- Lu Yi Jing (陸奕靜) as An's mother
- Zhao Zi Qiang (趙自強) as Attorney Hong
- Bao Zheng Fang (鮑正芳) as Ying Xiong's mother
- Renzo Liu as Jian Da De 簡大德
- Xiao Call (小Call) as Tian Mi Mi 田蜜蜜
- Li Lu (李律)
- Luo Mei Ling (羅美玲)

== International broadcast ==
In February 2013, Malaysia's television station TV2 began broadcasting the series. In December 2021, the series began streaming on Netflix.

Country	Network(s)/Station(s)	Series premiere	Title
Thailand	Channel 3	June 2015	คู่หูฟัดเต็มสปีด (Koo Hu Fad Tem Speed)

== Awards and nominations ==
2009 - 44th Golden Bell Awards (金鐘獎), Taiwan.

- Awarded: Black & White for Best Television Series
- Nominated: Vic Chou for Best Actor
- Awarded: Mark Chao for Best Actor
- Nominated: Kingone Wang for Best Supporting Actor
- Awarded: Cai Yuexun (蔡岳勳) for Best Directing for a Television Series (Golden Bell Awards)|Best Directing for a Television Series
- Nominated: Wu Luo Ying (吳絡纓), Chen Hui Ru (陳慧如) for Best Writing for a Television Series
- Nominated: Carrie Recording Studio for Best Sound for a Television Series
- Nominated: Ceng Kai Lun for Best Lighting for a Television Series
- Awarded: 郭臻鈺、Olivia BUFFETEAU-CHEN(陳昕蘋)、戴德偉 for Best Art and Design for a Television Series
- Awarded: Black & White for Best Best Marketing Programme
- Nominated: Black & White for Best Channel Advertisement for a Television Series

== See also ==
- Black & White Episode I: The Dawn of Assault
- Black & White: The Dawn of Justice
