= Ning Chang =

Taiwanese actress and film producer (born 1982)

- 張鈞甯
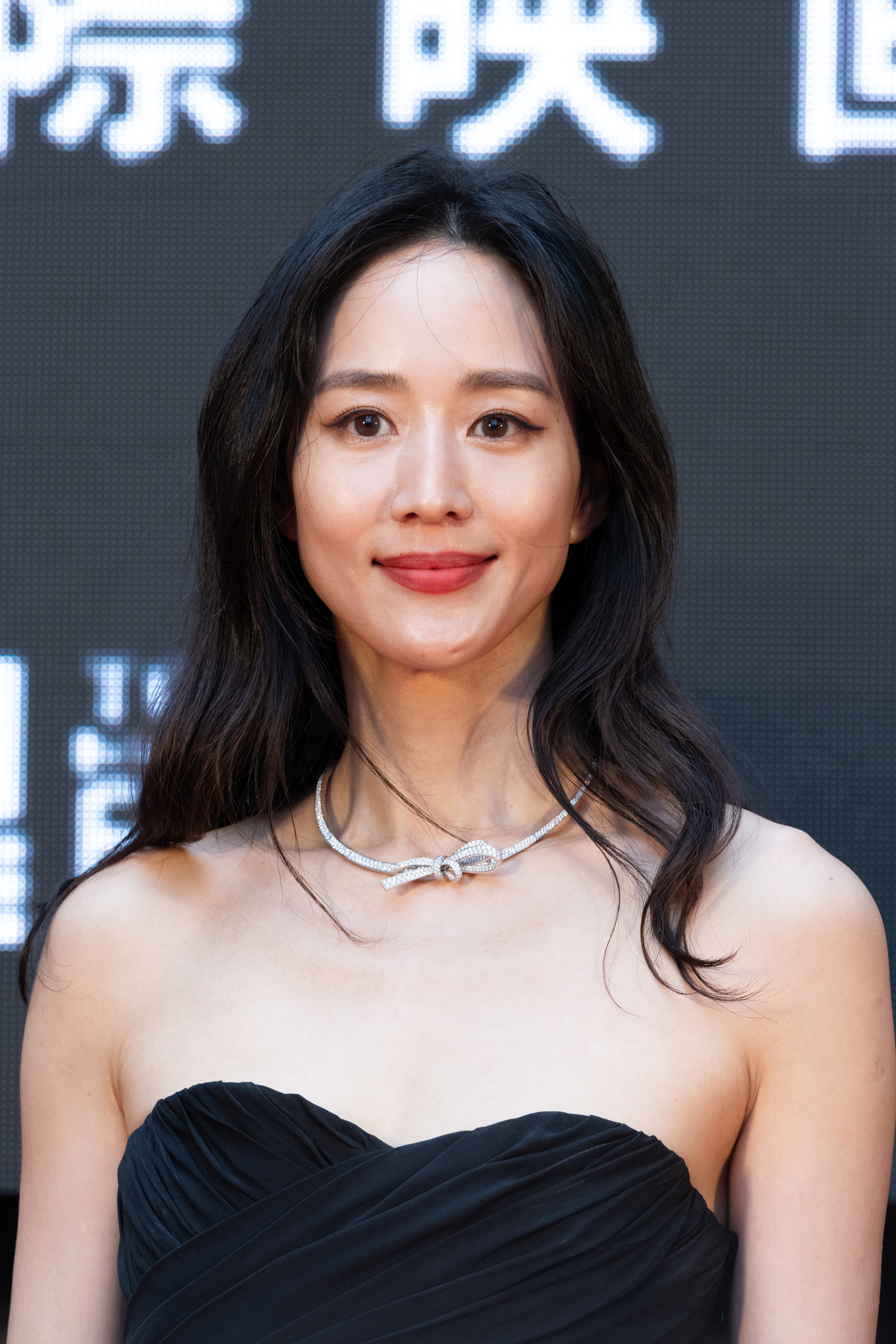
- Chang at the 37th Tokyo International Film Festival in October 2024
- Born: September 4, 1982 (age 44); Munich, Bavaria, West Germany
- Education: National Taipei University (LLB); National Central University (MS)
- Occupations: Actress; film producer
- Years active: 2003–present

Chinese name
- Traditional Chinese: 張鈞甯
- Simplified Chinese: 张钧甯
- Hanyu Pinyin: Zhāng Jūnníng
- Wade–Giles: Chang Chun-ning

Alternative Chinese name
- Traditional Chinese: 張鈞寗
- Simplified Chinese: 张钧寗
- Hanyu Pinyin: Zhāng Jūnníng
- Wade–Giles: Chang Chun-ning
- Website: ningchang.net

Chang Chun-ning (Chinese: 張鈞甯; pinyin: Zhāng Jūnníng; born September 4, 1982), also known as Ning Chang and previously known as Janine Chang, (Note: Ning Chang used to use the name Janine Chang, and although she no longer uses it herself, it is still used by some media outlets.) is a Taiwanese actress and film producer.

Chang is known for portraying Guan Xin in The Hospital and Lan Xi Ying in Black & White.

Since 2010, Chang began working more in Mainland China and earned recognition for her roles in The Empress of China, Ruyi's Royal Love in the Palace, and The Soul.

Chang ranked 78th on Forbes China Celebrity 100 list in 2019.

== Early life and education ==
Chang was born on September 4, 1982 in Munich, West Germany. Her family were prominent businesspeople in Daya, Taichung. Her grandfather, Chang Jui-chen, was the owner of the Miyahara Ice Cream building. Her father, Chang Chih-ming, was a professor of sociology at National Taiwan University. Her mother, Cheng Ju-ching, was a children's book author. Chang and her older sister were born in West Germany while their father was a graduate student at LMU Munich. They moved back to Taiwan in 1986.

After attending Taipei Municipal Jingmei Girls' High School, she graduated from National Taipei University with a bachelor's degree in law. In June 2010, Chang earned a master's degree in industrial economics from National Central University.

== Career ==
Chang started out as an assistant to a talent agent. She began acting in music videos and commercials. In 2006, she got her first career breakthrough in The Hospital.

In 2007, she was nominated for Best Supporting Actress for What on Earth Have I Done Wrong?! at the 44th Golden Horse Awards. She won Best Actress for the same role at the Taipei Film Festival in 2008.

In 2018, she was chosen as an ambassador for the 58th Asia-Pacific Film Festival.

== Endorsements ==
In 2019, Chang was named as the first brand ambassador for Italian high-end jewelry brand Pomellato in Greater China. American beauty brand Elizabeth Arden enlisted her as their Asia brand ambassador for skincare. She was named as brand ambassador for American luxury beauty brand Tom Ford Beauty.

In 2021, French luxury fashion house Chanel announced that Chang became its house ambassador.

== Filmography ==
=== Film ===
Year	English title	Original title	Role	Notes/Ref.
2004	Holiday Dreaming	夢遊夏威夷	Chen Hsin-hsin	
2005	The Strait Story	南方紀事之浮世光影	Lee Kuei-hsiang	
2005	In the Day to Come	五月天概念电影《未來》	Hsiao-ling	Short film
2006	Record	紀錄	Wei Wei	Short film
2006	Silk	詭絲	Ho Mei	
2006	The Song of Spirits	心靈之歌	Tsu-hui	
2007	What on Earth Have I Done Wrong?!	情非得已之生存之道	Ningning	
2008	Tea Fight	鬪茶	Ruhua	
2009	Murderer	殺人犯	Hazel	
2009	The Wingless Swallow	不能飛的鳥	Yuen Yuen	Short film
2009	Monsters vs. Aliens	怪獸大戰外星人	Susan Murphy	Taiwanese release, voice
2010	Zoom Hunting	獵豔	Yang Ruyi	
2011	Black & White Episode I: The Dawn of Assault	痞子英雄首部曲：全面開戰	Lan Hsi-ying	Voice
2011	Racer Legend	赛车传奇	Lin Wei-tung	
2011	A Monster in Paris	巴黎魅影	Lucille	Taiwanese release, voice
2012	Tokyo Newcomer	東京に来たばかり / 初到東京	Nanako	
2012	Of Love and Rain	晴雨之间	Woman with braces	Short film
2013	Dare to Love	勇敢去愛	Chang Chun-ning	
2014	One Minute More	只要一分鐘	Tsai Wan-chen	
2014	Black & White: The Dawn of Justice	痞子英雄2：黎明再起	Lan Hsi-ying	
2016	Alice's Wedding	艾莉絲的婚禮	Alice	
2016	Not Only About a Fish	一条没有变成蓝色的鱼	Fang Ching	Short film
2017	Youth Dinner	六人晚餐	Hsiao-lan	
2018	Girls 2	閨蜜2：无二不作	Chia-lan	
2018	Air Strike	大轰炸	Xian Que	
2020	Love After Love	第一炉香	Ni Er	
2020	Knockout	我們永不言棄	adult Blithe	
2020	Little Big Women	孤味	A Mei	
2021	Detective Chinatown 3	唐人街探案3	Ivy	
2021	The Soul	緝魂	Ah Bao	
2021	Sheep Without a Shepherd 2	误杀2		
2022	The Abandoned	查無此心	Wu Jie	Also as producer
2024	A Place Called Silence	默杀	Li Han	
2024	749 Bureau	749局		

=== Television series ===
Year	English title	Mandarin title	Role	Notes/Ref.
2002	Meteor Garden II	流星花園2	Xi Men's secretary	
2003	Love Train	心動列車	Young Xiaowu	
2003	Banquet	赴宴	Chen Yi-hsin	
2004	Garden - Hero	絕地花園單元五之《英雄》		Miniseries
2006	The Hospital	白色巨塔	Kuan Hsin	
2007	Wayward Kenting	我在墾丁*天氣晴	Ting Hsiao-wei	
2008	Honey and Clover	蜂蜜幸運草	He Yagong	
2009	Black & White	痞子英雄	Lan Hsi-ying	
2010	A Weaver on the Horizon	天涯织女	Huang Qiao'er	
2011	Sunny Happiness	幸福最晴天	Fang Yung-yung	
2011	Ring Ring Bell	真心请按两次铃	Cheng Hsiao-hsiang	alternative title: True Love Doesn't Give Up
2012	Happy Michelin Kitchen	幸福三顆星	Fang Yung-yung	Cameo
2012	Fairytale	童話二分之一	Chao Ting-hsuan / Chao Ting-yu	
2012	Home	回家 / 彼岸1945	Mizoguchi Yukiko	
2013	Unconditional Love	乐俊凯	Li Yeh	webseries
2013	Best Time	最美的時光	Su Man	
2013	Seven Friends	七個朋友	Cut	Cameo
2014	You Light Up My Star	你照亮我星球	Chang Man-ling	
2014	The Empress of China	武則天	Xu Hui	
2015	The Four	少年四大名捕	Chu Yingxue / Chu Limo	
2017	Midnight Diner	深夜食堂	Sun Kewei	Special appearance
2017	Jade	女管家	Dongfang Jingqi	
2017	The Advisors Alliance	军师联盟	Bo Lingyun	
2017	Tribes and Empires: Storm of Prophecy	九州·海上牧雲記	Yin Rong	Special appearance
2018	Here to Heart	温暖的弦	Wen Nuan	
2018	Ruyi's Royal Love in the Palace	如懿传	Keliyete·Hailan	
2020 - 2024	Detective Chinatown	唐人街探案	Ivy	Main Role (Season 1) Cameo (Season 2), 5 Episodes
2021	Never Say Goodbye	不说再见	Ou Kexin	Main Role
2021	Who's By Your Side	誰在你身邊	Zeng Yong Qi	Main Role
2021	The Psychologist	女心理师	Wen He [Wen Liang's sister]	Guest Role (Ep. 31-32)
2025	The Outlaw Doctor	化外之醫	Zheng Wan-ping	Main Role
TBA	River Sunset	长河落日	Ye Biying	Main Role

=== Micro-film ===
Year	English title	Mandarin title	Role	Notes
2020	Palace of Serendipity	故事宮寓	Treasure: Narcissus Basin	Stage: Scissors Finding a Cat

=== Variety show ===
Year	English title	Mandarin title	Notes/Ref.
2015	Survivor Games with Bear Grylls	跟着贝尔去冒险	Season 1, Female winner

=== Music video appearances ===
Year	Song title	Artist
1999	"Hate You"	Shin
2002	"Tile Dance"	Stella Chang
2002	"Perfect"	Z-Chen
2002	"Never Learn"	Francesca Kao
2002	"Coffee"	Jacky Cheung
2002	"Return To The Past"	Jay Chou
2003	"Old Lover"	Michelle Pan
2004	"Not Alone"	Dave Wong
2004	'"Remember"	Roy Chiu
2004	"Flow to Paris"	Wallace Chung
2005	"Jaws"	Mayday
2005	"Snowing"	A-do
2005	"Night Shining Night"	One-Fang
2005	"Springtime for Wild Lilies"	Shaun
2006	"Too Young"	Shadya Lan
2006	"I Promise You"	Power Station
2008	"I Believe In"	T.G.U.S
2009	"Cry Out"	Color
2012	"Anonymous Sadness"	Show Lo
2012	"Significant Others"	Deserts Chang
2012	"Unrequited"	Yoga Lin
2012	"Vulture"	Yoga Lin
2013	"All For You"	Chris Wang
2013	"Wǒ bù zhù fú"	Matilda Tao

== Theater ==
Year	English title	Mandarin title	Notes/Ref.
2008	Turn Left, Turn Right	向左走向右走	
2013	Closer	情迷	

== Discography ==
=== Soundtrack appearances ===
Year	Song title	Album
2008	"The Blessings of Clover" (with Joe Cheng, Eddie Peng, Lego Lee and Chiaki Ito)	Honey and Clover OST
2008	"Not Owing"	Turn Left, Turn Right OST
2008	"Love Sometimes"	Turn Left, Turn Right OST
2014	"Love Gravitation" (with Joe Cheng)	You Light Up My Star OST

== Awards and nominations ==
Year	Award	Category	Nominated work	Result
2007	44th Golden Horse Awards	Best Supporting Actress	What on Earth Have I Done Wrong?!	Nominated
2008	10th Taipei Film Festival	Best Actress	What on Earth Have I Done Wrong?!	Won
2018	24th Huading Awards	Best Supporting Actress	The Advisors Alliance	Won
2018	10th China TV Drama Awards	Best Performance Award	Here to Heart	Won
2023	25th Taipei Film Festival	Best Actress	The Abandoned	Nominated
2023	25th Taipei Film Festival	Best Feature (Note: Shared with the producers of the film)	The Abandoned	Nominated
2024	9th Golden Crane Awards via 37th Tokyo International Film Festival	Best Actress	A Place Called Silence	Won
2025	61st Asia-Pacific Film Festival	Best Actress	A Place Called Silence	Won
2025	60th Golden Bell Awards	Best Leading Actress in a TV Series	The Outlaw Doctor	Nominated
