= Terri Kwan =

Taiwanese actress, model, singer and author

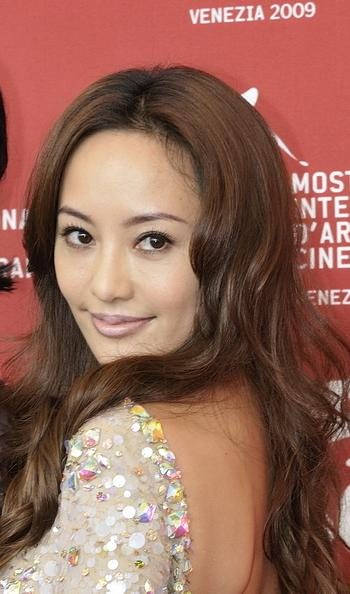
- Kwan in 2010
- Born: Chen Pin-ying (陳品穎); 2 July 1976 (age 50); Tokyo, Japan
- Education: University of the Arts (Philadelphia); New York University
- Occupations: Actress; singer; model; author
- Years active: 2001–present
- Spouse: Christian Chu (m. 2013)
- Children: 3

Chinese name
- Traditional Chinese: 關穎
- Simplified Chinese: 关颖
Transcriptions
Standard Mandarin
- Hanyu Pinyin: Guan Ying

This is a Chinese name; the family name is Chen. In the stage name, the surname is Kwan.

Terri Kwan (Chinese: 關穎; pinyin: Guan Ying; born 2 July 1976) is a Taiwanese actress, singer and socialite.

== Early life ==
Kwan was born in Tokyo, Japan. Her father, Edward Chen Kuo-ho, the former chairman of Jih Sun Financial Holding, while her mother, Tsai Shu-yuan, is the daughter of Tsai Wan-chun, founder of the Lin Yuan Group.

Kwan moved from Japan to Taiwan at 5. She studied dancing at the University of the Arts in Philadelphia before graduating from New York University with a master's degree in arts administration.

== Career ==
In 2001, Kwan began appearing in advertisements and endorsing numerous products, like Tobaby Hair Products and JC Sunglasses. In 2002, she had one of her first leading roles in the Taiwanese film Drop Me a Cat alongside Japanese actor Shinji Takeda. She has also played a part in the first Chinese-language Asian film ever from Warner Bros., Turn Left, Turn Right, as the supporting role of Ruby. For her role, she was nominated for the Best Supporting Actress award at the 40th Golden Horse Award.

In 2007, she appeared alongside Peter Ho in My DNA Says I Love You, where they played lovers. Then, in 2009, she appeared in the television series Starlit, shot in Shanghai, together with Jerry Yan. She played a female patient who suffered from the rare disease of amyotrophic lateral sclerosis. In the same year, she also starred in another Taiwanese film Prince of Tears, which premiered at the 66th Venice Film Festival. She sat as a jury member for the 14th (2009) Pusan International Film Festival's "New Currents" section. Recently, she has also published her own book.

== Filmography ==
=== Film ===
| Year | English title | Original title | Role |
|---|---|---|---|
| 2002 | Southbound Swallow | 小雨之歌 | |
| 2002 | Drop Me a Cat | 給我一隻貓 | |
| 2003 | Turn Left, Turn Right | 向左走·向右走 | Ruby |
| 2005 | The Heirloom | 宅變 | Yo |
| 2007 | Shamo | 軍雞 | Moemi Funato |
| 2007 | Brotherhood of Legio | 神選者 | Ya Zhu |
| 2007 | My DNA Says I Love You | 基因決定我愛你 | Gigi |
| 2008 | Good Will Evil | 兇魅 | Yi-Hsi |
| 2008 | Buttonman | 鈕扣人 | Juan |
| 2009 | Prince of Tears | 淚王子 | Ou Yang Qian Jun |
| 2010 | The Fourth Portrait | 第四張畫 | Huang Laoshi (Teacher Huang) |
| 2012 | Black & White | 痞子英雄首部曲:全面開戰 | Du Xiao-Qing |
| 2012 | Good-for-Nothing Heros | 請叫我英雄 | Susan |
| 2012 | Mother Android II | 瑪德2號 | Hsiao Tieh's aunt |
| 2013 | My Lucky Star | 非常幸运 | Charlize |
| 2014 | Black & White: The Dawn of Justice | 痞子英雄2：黎明升起 | Du Xiao-Qing |

=== Television series ===
| Year | English title | Original title | Role |
|---|---|---|---|
| 2002 | Toast Boy's Kiss II | 吐司男之吻II | |
| 2003 | | 又見橘花香 | Luo Xin Lei |
| 2003 | Dandelion | 蒲公英 | Xia Xue |
| 2003 | Hi Working Girl | Hi 上班女郎 | Cameo |
| 2004 | Love Bird | 候鳥e人 | Xiang Zi/Li Yang Xiang |
| 2004 | Heaven's Wedding Gown | 天國的嫁衣 | Katrina |
| 2005 | | 偷天換日 | |
| 2008 | Wish to See You Again | 這裡發現愛 | Lu Yi |
| 2009 | Starlit | 心星的淚光 | Dong Xiao Lu |
