= 48th Golden Horse Awards =

Award ceremony for Chinese-language films of 2010 and 2011

- Promotional poster
- Date: November 26, 2011
- Site: Hsinchu Performing Arts Center, Hsinchu, Taiwan
- Hosted by: Eric Tsang and Bowie Tsang
- Preshow hosts: Yang Chien-pei and Na Dow
- Organized by: Taipei Golden Horse Film Festival Executive Committee

Highlights
- Best Feature Film: Warriors of the Rainbow: Seediq Bale
- Best Director: Ann Hui; A Simple Life
- Best Actor: Andy Lau; A Simple Life
- Best Actress: Deanie Ip; A Simple Life
- Most awards: Warriors of the Rainbow: Seediq Bale (5)
- Most nominations: Warriors of the Rainbow: Seediq Bale (11)

Television in Taiwan
- Channel: TTV

The 48th Golden Horse Awards (Mandarin:第48屆金馬獎) took place on November 26, 2011, at the Hsinchu Performing Arts Center in Hsinchu, Taiwan.

== Winners and nominees ==
Winners are listed first and highlighted in boldface.

| **Best Feature Film**: **Warriors of the Rainbow: Seediq Bale**; Let the Bullets Fly; A Simple Life; Return Ticket; The Piano in a Factory | **Best Short Film**: **Thief**; The Outsider; Meeting of the Half Moons; Horse with No Name |
| **Best Documentary**: **Hometown Boy**; The Man behind the Book; Young at Heart: Grandma Cheerleaders | **Best Animation Feature** - |
| **Best Director**: **Ann Hui — A Simple Life**; Wei Te-sheng — Warriors of the Rainbow: Seediq Bale; Jiang Wen — Let the Bullets Fly; Zhang Meng — The Piano in a Factory | **Best New Director**: **Wuershan — The Butcher, the Chef and the Swordsman**; Giddens Ko — You Are the Apple of My Eye; Xu Haofeng — The Sword Identity; Du Jia-yi — Kora |
| **Best Leading Actor**: **Andy Lau — A Simple Life**; Eddie Peng — Jump Ashin!; Ge You — Let the Bullets Fly; Wang Qianyuan — The Piano in a Factory | **Best Leading Actress**: **Deanie Ip — A Simple Life**; Michelle Chen — You Are the Apple of My Eye; Shu Qi — A Beautiful Life; Qin Hailu — The Piano in a Factory |
| **Best Supporting Actor**: **Bokeh Kosang — Warriors of the Rainbow: Seediq Bale**; Lawrence Ko — Jump Ashin!; Tony Liu — Revenge: A Love Story; Jimmy Wang Yu — Wu Xia | **Best Supporting Actress**: **Tang Qun — Return Ticket**; Kara Wai — A Chinese Ghost Story; Jiang Wenli — Love for Life; Carina Lau — Let the Bullets Fly |
**Best New Performer**: **Kai Ko — You Are the Apple of My Eye**; Nolay Piho — Warriors of the Rainbow: Seediq Bale; Bokeh Kosang — Warriors of the Rainbow: Seediq Bale; Lin Yuan-jie — Warriors of the Rainbow: Seediq Bale
| **Audience Choice Award**: **Warriors of the Rainbow: Seediq Bale**; Let the Bullets Fly; A Simple Life; Return Ticket; The Piano in a Factory | **FIPRESCI Prize** **(award for first and second features)**: **The Piano in a Factory** |
| **Outstanding Taiwanese Filmmaker of the Year**: **Wong Wei-liu**; Chen Hsiao-tung; Yang Li-chou | **Lifetime Achievement Award**: **Ting Shan-hsi** |
