= You Are the Apple of My Eye =

2011 Taiwanese film directed by Giddens Ko

- Hong Kong theatrical poster
- Directed by: Giddens Ko
- Written by: Giddens Ko
- Based on: The Girl We Chased Together in Those Years by Giddens Ko
- Produced by: Angie Chai; Adam Tsuei
- Starring: Kai Ko; Michelle Chen
- Cinematography: Patrick Chou
- Edited by: Liao Ming-yi
- Music by: Chris Hou
- Production company: Star Ritz Productions
- Distributed by: 20th Century Fox
- Release dates: 25 June 2011 (Taipei Film Festival); 19 August 2011 (Taiwan)
- Running time: 110 minutes
- Country: Taiwan
- Language: Mandarin
- Budget: NT$50 million (approx. US$1.7 million)
- Box office: US$24.5 million

You Are the Apple of My Eye (Chinese: 那些年，我們一起追的女孩, lit. 'Those Years, The Girl We Went After Together') is a 2011 Taiwanese coming-of-age romance film. It is based on the semi-autobiographical novel of the same name by Taiwanese author Giddens Ko, who also made his directorial debut with the film. The film stars Ko Chen-tung as Ko Ching-teng, a prankster and a mischievous student who eventually becomes a writer. Michelle Chen stars as Shen Chia-yi, an honor student who is very popular amongst the boys in her class.

You Are the Apple of My Eye was filmed almost entirely on location in Changhua County, including at the high school Giddens attended. The lyrics of "Those Years", the film's main theme, were written by Giddens. The song, which was well received by the public, was nominated for Best Original Film Song at the 48th Golden Horse Awards.

The film's world premiere was at the 13th Taipei Film Festival on 25 June 2011, and it was subsequently released in Taiwanese cinemas on 19 August. Well received by film critics, the movie set box-office records in Taiwan, Hong Kong, and Singapore. Ko Chen-tung won the Best New Performer award at the Golden Horse Awards for his role in the film.

== Plot ==
The story begins in 1994. An outstanding student, Shen Chia-yi, is popular among her teachers and classmates. Ko Ching-teng, a mischievous and poor student, claims that he has no interest in her, despite being her classmate since junior high school. When Chia-yi forgets her textbook, Ching-teng gives her his, pretending that he is the one who forgot, and is punished by the teacher. Touched, Chia-yi prepares practice exams for him to encourage him to get better grades, and they grow closer, with Ching-teng's grades gradually improving. Chia-yi stands up for Ching-teng against a teacher and is punished, earning Ching-teng's and his friends' respect.

On graduation, Ching-teng enrolls at the National Chiao Tung University. Chia-Yi, who was ill during examinations and performed poorly, only manages to enter the National Taipei University of Education with her mediocre test results. Depressed and upset, she is consoled by Ching-teng, who calls her long-distance almost every night from his university. During the winter holiday season that year, the two go on their first "date", during which Ching-teng asks Chia-yi if she likes him. However, fearing she would say no, he decides that he would rather not hear her answer. Ching-teng later organizes a fight night and invites Chia-yi to watch, hoping to impress her with his strength, but instead she finds it childish and disturbing. This upsets Ching-teng, sparking a quarrel that causes the two to stop speaking.

During the years after their split, Ching-teng has no contact with Chia-yi. He qualifies for a graduate research course at Tunghai University, where he begins writing stories online. The two briefly make contact after the 1999 Jiji earthquake, when Ching-teng calls to see if Chia-yi is okay. They both reflect that they were not fated to become a couple. Ching-teng begins writing a web novel inspired by their relationship.

Years later, in 2005, Chia-yi calls Ching-teng to tell him that she is getting married. All of their old friends gather at the wedding, reminiscing about their youth and friendships. When they gather to congratulate the bride and groom, the friends demand to kiss the bride, and the groom jokingly responds that they must kiss him the way they would kiss her. Ching-teng surprises everyone by kissing the groom passionately. While doing so, he imagines sharing the kiss with Chia-yi instead, with all of the bittersweet memories of their youth being flashed back.

== Cast ==
- Kai Ko as Ko Ching-teng (nicknamed "Ko-teng"), a mischievous schoolboy who later becomes a writer (Ko Ching-teng is the real name of the director, Giddens).
- Michelle Chen as Shen Chia-yi, an outgoing student who consistently scores well in tests. Although she disdains boys less intelligent than herself, she decides to help Ching-teng improve his grades. In the process, she falls in love with him.
- Owodog as Tsao Kuo-sheng (nicknamed "Lao Tsao"), one of Ching-teng's friends. He had a crush on Chia-yi, and once asked Ching-teng to deliver a love letter he had written for her.
- Steven Hao as Hsieh Ming-ho (nicknamed "A-he"), one of Ching-teng's friends. He loves to eat, and is the butt of his friends' jokes due to this. He is the only person in the group who has dated Chia-yi.
- Emerson Tsai as Liao Ying-hung, one of Ching-teng's best friends. He likes to crack jokes and perform magic tricks, and later becomes a librarian.
- Yen Sheng-yu as Hsu Bo-chun (nicknamed "Boner"), one of Ching-teng's friends
- Wan Wan as Hu Chia-wei, Chia-yi's best friend. She likes to draw pictures, and after graduating from school becomes a manga artist known as "The Queen of Blogs".

== Production ==
=== Development ===
You Are the Apple of My Eye is based on Giddens's semi-autobiographical novel of the same name. He changed some details of the story to make the film more dramatic; for example, Ching-teng and Chia-yi's fight actually took place over the phone, not in the rain as depicted. Giddens said, "although some of the reasons for the events in the film were changed, the main storyline remained unchanged". Asked if he was pressured by the recent success of Taiwanese films at the box office, he replied: "No, I am more pressured by whether the film is nice to watch, whether it will succeed in the box office, and whether it will become an embarrassment for me. Also, if the film is not nice, it will be a letdown to Chen-tung and Michelle, who have been working so hard".

At first, the film was on a tight budget; Giddens used his entire savings and mortgaged his house to raise money, saying that he did it to impress ex-girlfriend, who provided the inspiration for this film's female protagonist, Shen Chia-yi. Executive producer Angie Chai also played a key role in raising money for the film.

=== Casting ===
Michelle Chen was the first cast member confirmed by the director. Mypaper reported that Giddens was attracted to her during their first meeting, saying that she resembled the real Shen Chia-yi. Chen had previously starred in Taiwanese television drama series such as Why Why Love and Miss No Good, although she was better known for her 2009 film Hear Me. Chen went on a diet to lose weight for the role, saying she wished to "not disappoint the director". Giddens later used her as a basis to select the other cast members. The selection process for the male lead was the longest, and a series of auditions attracted several celebrities. Giddens chose first-time actor Ko Chen-tung because he felt he showed great improvement in his acting skills in each successive audition. Giddens liked his attitude, having seen Ko Chen-tung hiding in a corner, frantically studying the script just before his audition.

The director chose Ao-chuan, Yen Sheng-yu, Hao Shao-wen, and Tsai Chang-hsien to play the roles of his high school friends. He described Hao Shao-wen as being a persuasive speaker, Tsai Chang-hsien as being a very good prankster, and Ao-chuan as self-confident. Hu Chia-wei played herself as a teenager. Giddens describes the two of them as "the Jay Chou and Jolin Tsai of the [Chinese] publishing world".

Giddens's mother told him that she would like either Lotus Wang or Phoebe Huang to play her in the film. In the end, Giddens settled on Lotus Wang, because she did not have any other work commitments at that time. Ko Chen-tung's real father plays the father in the film.

=== Filming ===
You Are the Apple of My Eye was primarily filmed at Ching Cheng High School (精誠中學), the school Giddens and Shen Chia-yi attended. The director said he chose the school because "he wanted so badly to see Ko Chen-tung and Michelle Chen in the school uniform that he remembered vividly". The filming of the school scenes could only be done during the Taiwanese school holidays. Because the main location was at the school, it was decided to film the remainder of the film on location throughout Changhua County. The filming had a reported budget of NT$50 million (approx. US$1.67M in January 2012).

=== Theme song ===
"Childish" (孩子氣), a song from the film, was written and sung by Michelle Chen. Giddens was so touched by the song that he shed tears "on the spot" after first hearing it; in particular, he liked the song's lyrics. He also praised Michelle's dedication to her role, saying "I believe that the reason that she managed to get inspiration to write this song is because she likes her role [in this film]".

Giddens was also involved in some of this film's theme songs, including "Those Years" (那些年). At first Giddens could not decide on the closing theme for this film; however, after hearing one of Japanese composer Mitsutoshi Kimura's new compositions he chose it and added lyrics. "The Lonely Caffeine" (寂寞的咖啡因) had been composed by Giddens for Shen Chia-Yi when the two were in a relationship. He asked the male lead actor to sing the song in the film, because he felt this would convey the song's original meaning.

"Those Years" was an instant hit. The music video on YouTube logged its ten millionth viewer on 11 November 2011, leading Giddens to note that the song "broke every notable viewership record set by a Chinese-language video on Youtube". In the Taiwanese KKBOX singles daily charts, "Those Years" remained at the top for 64 consecutive days, from 22 August to 22 October 2011, breaking the previous record of 45 consecutive days. The song was nominated for the Best Original Film Soundtrack award at the 48th Golden Horse Awards.

=== Editing ===
You Are the Apple of My Eye was edited over for its various releases due to its controversial content. In Taiwan, the film was initially given a "Restricted" film classification. Giddens was extremely upset by this, and even personally went to Government Information Office to appeal. The film had to be edited 4 times in order to lower its classification. In the end, the film received a "Guidance" classification, meaning that children above 12 are able to watch it. In Malaysia, the scene where the students masturbated in the classroom was deleted. In Singapore, the film remained unedited, but it received a NC-16 rating, thus restricting the film to viewers above 16.

The film was heavily edited for its mainland China release. The scene where a flag-raising ceremony was taking place was edited away, as were the scenes involving masturbation. In total, six scenes involving "negative sexual and pro-Taiwan content" were either edited away or changed. The director also had to add new scenes in order to make the story flow more smoothly after editing.

== Soundtrack ==
You Are the Apple of My Eye Original Soundtrack

Soundtrack album by various artists
- Released: 5 August 2011
- Label: Sony Music Entertainment Taiwan

The original soundtrack album for You Are the Apple of My Eye was released by Sony Music Entertainment Taiwan on 5 August 2011. It contains six songs with vocals and nine instrumental pieces that were used in this film.

CD
No.	Title	Lyrics	Music	Length
1.	"Blue Dot on the Uniform" (制服上的藍點)			0:40
2.	"Never Turning Back" (永遠不回頭)			4:15
3.	"Jerking off" (打手槍)			1:04
4.	"Love Syndrome" (戀愛症候群)		Huang Su-jun	7:23
5.	"That Girl's Ponytail" (女孩的馬尾)			1:13
6.	"The Final Spray" (最後的浪花)			1:41
7.	"Everybody's Own Wings" (各自的翅膀)			1:43
8.	"Childish" (孩子氣)	Michelle Chen	Michelle Chen	4:15
9.	"The Free-Fighting Match that is Dedicated to You" (獻給妳的格鬥賽)			2:17
10.	"Stupid" (笨蛋)			1:36
11.	"The Lonely Caffeine" (寂寞的咖啡因)	Giddens Ko	Ko Chen-tung	4:41
12.	"My Youth Without You" (沒有你的青春)			1:26
13.	"Seeing You in the Crowd" (人海中遇見你)	Yin Cheng-yang (rewrite)	Lin Yu-chun	3:54
14.	"Those Years" (那些年)	Giddens Ko	Hu Xia	6:13
15.	"Memories" (迴憶)			1:32

DVD
No.	Title	Length
1.	"You Are the Apple of My Eye Behind the Scenes Footage"	60:00
2.	"You Are the Apple of My Eye Trailer"
3.	"You Are the Apple of My Eye Trailer (Romantic Version)"

== Release ==
You Are the Apple of My Eye made its debut in competition at the 13th Taipei Film Festival on 25 June 2011. The film made its international debut as the opening film for the sixth Summer International Film Festival in Hong Kong. It then had its general release in Taiwan on 19 August 2011.

The film was screened at the 24th Tokyo International Film Festival on 24 October 2011, where the director and cast were present. It was well-received, with audiences reportedly squeezing into the cinema to the extent that people had to sit in the aisles. Internationally, the film was released in Hong Kong and Macau on 20 October and in Singapore and Malaysia on 10 November 2011.

On 21 December, Giddens announced on his blog that the film passed the censorship board in China and would debut in that country on 6 January 2012. Giddens had previously expressed a wish for the film to be screened in China so Shen Chia-Yi, for whom he had made the film, could see it and comment. Giddens was unhappy when Chinese censors cut much of the film's "negative sexual and pro-Taiwan content". He apologized to viewers in China for being unable to deliver on his promise to show the full story, saying that he "blamed only himself". He added that he "did not think that the China's version was better [than the other overseas versions]."

Giddens revealed that negotiations were ongoing for the film's release in Europe and the United States. The film subsequently made its North American debut at the New York Asian Film Festival on 2 July 2012. It was later screened at the 2012 Fantasia Film Festival in Montreal. Giddens also announced that a sequel will be produced; it will begin production in 2013, and is expected to be released in cinemas in 2014. As of 2024, no sequel has been released and there are no plans for one.

You Are the Apple of My Eye was first aired on television on 24 March 2012 on the STAR Chinese Movies network. It became the most-watched film on television in Taiwan, having attracted an audience of almost 3 million people. In the 15 to 44 years old audience, it had an average rating of 7.14, with the rating peaking at 9.27 during the screening. It was also the most-watched television program on both cable and free-to-air networks in Taiwan. STAR Chinese Movies reportedly purchased the rights to the film for the price of NT$2 million (approx. US$69,000).

== Reception ==
=== Box office ===
You Are the Apple of My Eye grossed more than NT$$20 million at the Taiwanese box office during its soft launch. This makes it the first Taiwanese film to gross over NT$$20 million before its official release date. The film crossed the NT$200 million mark ten days after its official opening. In total, the film earned over NT$420 million at the Taiwanese box office, making it the third-highest-grossing film of 2011 in Taiwan.

In Hong Kong, You Are the Apple of My Eye grossed a total of HK$1,397,571 during its premiere (representing 50.6 percent of Hong Kong box-office earnings) on 20 October 2011. Four days after its release the film had earned a total of HK$11,525,621, breaking the record for the highest-grossing film debuting in the month of October. (Note: The previous record was set in 2003 by Infernal Affairs II, which earned HK$8,941,266.) It also set a record for the highest-grossing opening weekend for a Taiwanese film at the Hong Kong box office, previously held by Lust, Caution in 2007 with a gross of $11,441,946. The film recorded the highest Hong Kong opening-four-day attendance in 2011 with 211,163 attending, breaking 3D Sex and Zen: Extreme Ecstasy's previous record of 143,222. The film also has the highest four-day gross of a 2D film in 2011, and remained the highest-grossing film in Hong Kong cinemas for four consecutive weekends. During the final hours of 2011, it was announced that You Are the Apple of My Eye had grossed over HK$61.28 million, making it the all-time highest-grossing Taiwanese film at the Hong Kong box office. (Note: The record was previously held by the 2004 film Kung Fu Hustle.) At the Macau box office, You Are the Apple of My Eye earned more than HK$100,000 in its opening weekend, with nearly 100-percent attendance.

In Singapore You Are the Apple of My Eye earned a total of SGD$675,000, making it the second-highest-grossing film in Singapore that weekend despite the film's NC-16 rating (which meant that only viewers over age 16 were admitted); this surprised the film's distributor, 20th Century Fox. The film broke the record for highest opening weekend for a Taiwanese film in Singapore, previously held by the 2007 film Secret. It surpassed the performance of other Taiwanese films such as Monga, Cape No. 7 and Lust, Caution. You Are the Apple of My Eye was the highest-grossing Asian film of 2011 at the Singapore box office, with earnings of SGD$2.93 million.

At the Chinese box office, You Are the Apple of My Eye became the most popular Taiwanese film, surpassing the previous record set by Cape No. 7 in 2008. It was the third-highest-earning film on its debut weekend, grossing about 27 million yuan. The film subsequently crossed the 50-million-yuan-gross mark on 13 January 2012.

=== Critical response ===
Maggie Lee of The Hollywood Reporter described the film as a "larky retro coming-of-age confection". She praised the film, saying that it "injects a fresh, tart edge to the genre with a constantly self-mocking boys' angle", which she described as an "alternative to Asian teen movies that tend to be syrupy". She said that "the youthful cast has a limited register but offer enough self-conscious blasé posing." She described the film's texture as "slightly over-bright". Russell Edwards, reviewing for Variety, criticized the second part of this film, which he says is "unable to maintain the outlandish phallocentric humor of its first hour". He further criticized the last quarter of the film, which Edwards says "sees Giddens overestimating the charm of his own story". Edwards praised the film's cast which, he said, were the film's "greatest asset". He also praised the film as "a much more robust production than many similar youth-skewing Taiwanese romancers over the past decade".

Serene Lim, a reviewer for Today, labelled the film a "gentle tale of a teenage romance". She said that "Ko's talents as a novelist are evident", although his "attention to detail can get indulgently long-winded at times". Lim singled out Ko Chen-tung for praise, saying that "[he] thoroughly deserves his Golden Horse nomination for Best Newcomer, given his turn as the impetuous rebel made good"; overall, she gave the film a rating of 3.5 out of 5. Yong Shu Hoong, writing for Singapore-based Mypaper, said that the "flashback sequences can reek of oversentimentality", although the reviewer added that "the thrills, rivalries and heartbreak associated with high school romance are well depicted with nostalgia and humour" and gave it a rating of 3 out of 5. The film was rated by Mtimes Movies as the "2nd Best Chinese Film of 2011".

Film Business Asia gave the film a rating of 7/10, with Derek Elley describing it as "a confident feature" and "slickly packaged in every department", the latter making it "easy to miss the fact there's nothing at all original here". He praised the cast as "well-chosen individually and relaxed as an ensemble". He added, "apart from a slightly draggy second half, the material sustains itself at almost two hours, with generally trim editing by co-executive director Liao." He concluded by summarizing the film's plot as a "simple teenage rom-com, a will-they/won't-they between two opposites, but capped by a neat finale that does deliver some real emotion".

== Accolades ==
Year	Award	Category	Recipient	Result
2011	13th Taipei Film Awards	Audience Award	You Are the Apple of My Eye	Won
2011	48th Golden Horse Awards	Best Actress	Michelle Chen; Also for the film Tempest of First Love	Nominated
2011	48th Golden Horse Awards	Best New Performer	Ko Chen-tung	Won
2011	48th Golden Horse Awards	Best New Director	Giddens Ko	Nominated
2011	48th Golden Horse Awards	Best Original Film Song	Those Years (那些年)	Nominated
2012	6th Asian Film Awards	Best Actress	Michelle Chen	Nominated
2012	6th Asian Film Awards	Best Newcomer	Ko Chen-tung	Nominated
2012	6th Asian Film Awards	People's Choice Award for Favorite Actress	Michelle Chen	Nominated
2012	31st Hong Kong Film Awards	Best Film from China and Taiwan	You are the Apple of My Eye	Won
2012	12th Chinese Film Media Awards	Best New Director	Giddens Ko	Won
2012	12th Chinese Film Media Awards	Best New Actor	Ko Chen-tung	Won
2012	12th Chinese Film Media Awards	Most Anticipated Film	You Are the Apple of My Eye	Won
2012	12th Chinese Film Media Awards	Most-watched Actress	Michelle Chen	Nominated
2012	12th Chinese Film Media Awards	Most Anticipated Performance	Michelle Chen	Won

== Remakes ==
A Japanese remake titled Ano Koro, Kimi o Oikaketa (あの頃、君を追いかけた; lit. 'Back Then, I Chased After You') was released in 2018.

A Thai remake titled My Precious was released in 2023.

A South Korean remake of the same name starring Dahyun and Jung Jin-young premiered at the 29th Busan International Film Festival on 3 October 2024.
