= Everybody's Fine =

Everybody's Fine may refer to:

- Everybody's Fine (1990 film), an Italian film
- Everybody's Fine (2009 film), an American remake of the 1990 Italian film
- Everybody's Fine (2016 film), a Chinese film
