= Pali Road =

- Pali Road Chinese Theatrical Poster
- Directed by: Jonathan Lim
- Written by: Doc Pedrolie; Victoria Arch
- Produced by: Daxing Zhang; Cathy Lee; Kenneth Burke; Jonathan Lim
- Starring: Michelle Chen; Jackson Rathbone; Sung Kang; Henry Ian Cusick
- Cinematography: Quyen Tran
- Edited by: Jason Schmid
- Music by: Jeff Marsh
- Production companies: Crimson Forest Entertainment; Cuixing Media Group; Island Film Group; Dadi Film; China Film Assist
- Release dates: November 16, 2015 (Hawaii Film Festival); November 25, 2016 (China)
- Running time: 95 minutes
- Countries: United States; China
- Language: English

Pali Road is a 2015 romantic mystery thriller film directed by Jonathan Lim, starring Michelle Chen as a young doctor who finds herself in a completely unfamiliar life after waking up from a car accident. The film co-stars Jackson Rathbone, Sung Kang and Henry Ian Cusick.

It was filmed in early 2015 on Oahu, Hawaii. The film had its world premier at the Hawaii International Film Festival in November 2015, where it was nominated for the Halekulani Golden Orchid Award for Best Feature Narrative.

The film earned an honorable mention for Best Feature Film at CAAMFest and was nominated for the Grand Jury Award for Best Feature Film at the Los Angeles Asian Pacific Film Festival. It won the Best Supporting Actress award for Elizabeth Sung and Best New Director award for Jonathan Lim at the 12th Chinese American Film Festival.

The film had its U.S. theatrical release in major cities on April 29. It was released in China on November 25, 2016.

== Synopsis ==
Lily (Michelle Chen), a young doctor, wakes up from a car accident and discovers she is living a completely different life. Now married to her boyfriend's rival, Dr. Mitch Kayne (Sung Kang), and a mother to a 5-year-old son, she has an established life she remembers nothing about.

Everyone around her denies that her boyfriend Neil (Jackson Rathbone) ever existed. As Lily begins to doubt her own sanity, memories of Neil resurface, causing unexplainable incidents. While desperately searching for the truth of her past life, she questions her entire existence.

== Cast ==
- Michelle Chen as Lily Zhang
- Jackson Rathbone as Neil Lang
- Sung Kang as Mitch Kayne
- Henry Ian Cusick as Tim Young
- Tzi Ma as Mr. Zhang
- Elizabeth Sung as Mrs. Zhang
- Lauren Sweetser as Amy Stole
- Maddox Lim as James Kayne
