= Guns and Kidneys =

- Chinese: 枪炮腰花
- Hanyu Pinyin: Qiāng pào yāohuā
- Directed by: Zhang Meng
- Written by: Liu Ya; Zhang Meng
- Produced by: Deng Shuo; Ren Su
- Starring: Wang Qianyuan; Huang Jingyu; Ivy Chen; Zhang Liang; Zhang Lanxin
- Cinematography: Sun Ming
- Country: China
- Language: Mandarin

Guns and Kidneys is an unreleased Chinese black comedy film directed by Zhang Meng, and stars Wang Qianyuan, Huang Jingyu, Ivy Chen, Zhang Liang, and Zhang Lanxin. The film was to be the first of its kind to introduce the combination of black humor with zombie elements into the Chinese film market. The film was expected to be released in 2019.

== Plot ==
Amon attempted to drift back home to hide from debt, only to find creditors at his door. Wounded, he fled into the wasteland and was rescued by Lao Fan. Lao Fan owns a small restaurant called Guns & Kidneys in an abandoned industrial area. About 15 years ago, the area experienced an attempted demolition, but due to the dissatisfied residents, the project was abandoned midway, leaving behind destitution. Amon found that the people here are lively and tough, but numb because business is bleak.

Opportunity arises when a foreign film crew chooses the abandoned industrial area for filming. As the residents look forward to the businesses that the new film could bring into the area, complications arrive when the demolition project revives and creditors close in.

== Cast ==
- Wang Qianyuan as Lao Fan
- Huang Jingyu as Amon
- Ivy Chen as Xiao Chu
- Zhang Liang as Lao San
- Zhang Lanxin as Dong Feifei

== Production ==
=== Filming ===
Principal photography on the film began on August 23, 2016 in Baotou, the largest industrial city in Inner Mongolia, China.
