= Wang Qianyuan =

Chinese actor (born 1972)

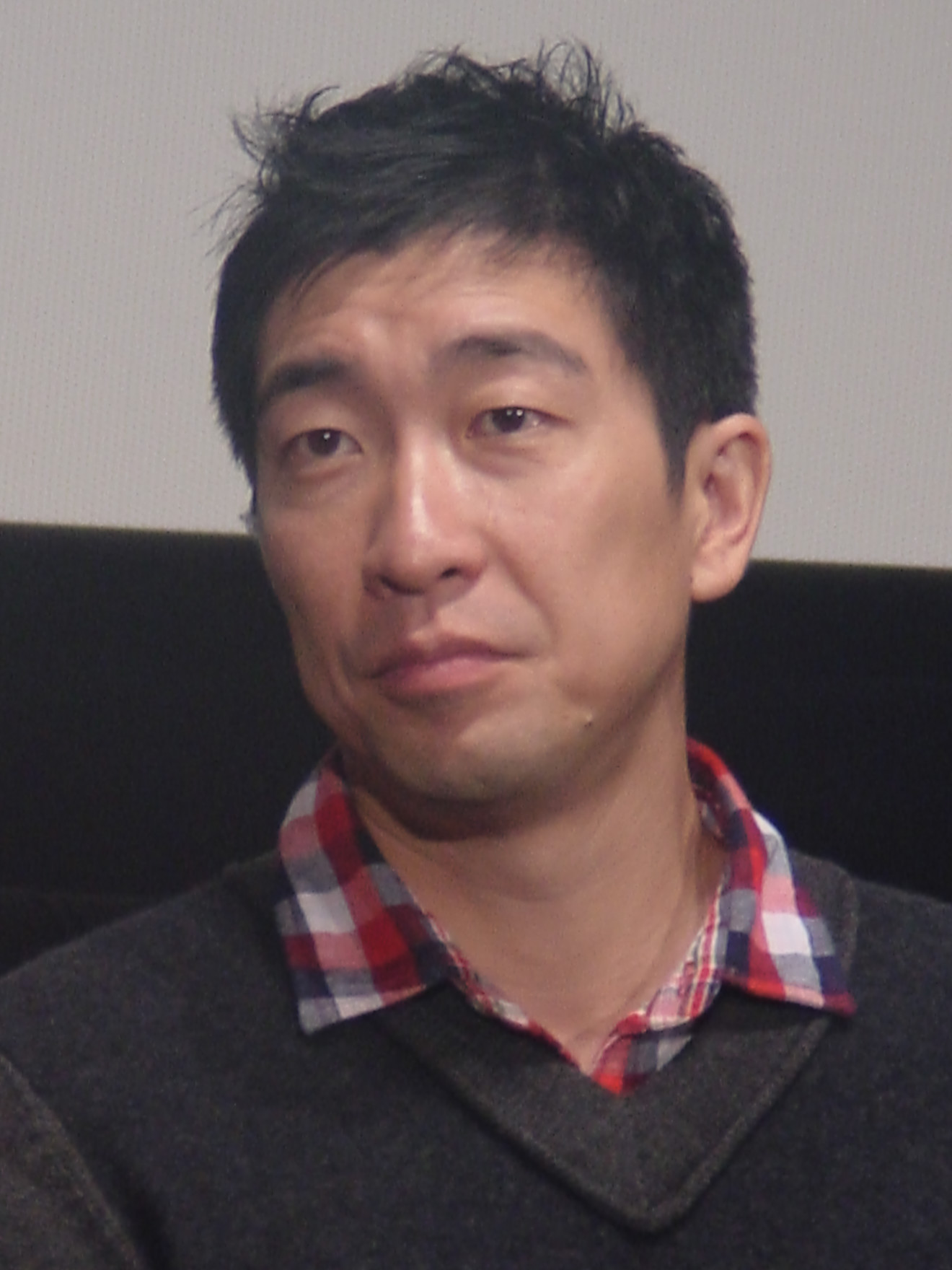
- Wang at the Tokyo International Film Festival 2010
- Born: 27 June 1972 (age 54); Shenyang, Liaoning, China
- Occupation: Actor
- Years active: 1994–present

Chinese name
- Chinese: 王千源
Transcriptions
Standard Mandarin
- Hanyu Pinyin: Wáng Qiānyuán

Wang Qianyuan is a Chinese actor who graduated from the Central Academy of Drama. He won Best Actor at the 23rd Tokyo International Film Festival for his role in the movie, The Piano in a Factory.

== Filmography ==
=== Film ===
Year	English title	Chinese title	Role	Notes/Ref.
1994	Winner	赢家	Xu Yuchuan	
1996		征服死亡地带	Li Xing	
1998	The Emperor and the Assassin	荆轲刺秦王	Zhao Shi	
1998		婚前别恋	Da Lu	
2000	The Happy Princess	欢乐公		
2000	Big and Small Show	大戏小戏		
2000	Breaking the Silence	漂亮妈妈		
2001	All the Way	走到底		
2002	Home in My Heart	山顶上的钟声		
2006	Aspirin	阿司匹林		
2008	Set Off	即日启程	Xiao Xia's boyfriend	
2009	Lao Ding's Spring	老丁的春天	Lao Ding	
2010	The Piano in a Factory	钢的琴	Chen Guilin	
2011	Sweet Journey	云下的日子	Qiang Sheng	
2011	Reviving of Beichuan	北川重生		
2014	Brotherhood of Blades	绣春刀	Lu Jianxing	
2014	The Golden Era	黄金时代	Nie Gannu	
2014	The Crossing	太平轮	Principal Gu	
2015	Saving Mr. Wu	解救吾先生	Zhang Hua	
2016	Run for Love	奔爱	Lu Jie	
2016	Everybody's Fine	一切都好		Cameo
2017	The Village of No Return	健忘村	Tian Gui	
2017	Lost in the Moonlight	月色撩人	Xie Gao	
2017	Sky Hunter	空天猎	Ling Weifeng	
2017	Peace Breaker	破局	Chen Changming	
2018	Goddesses in the Flames of War	那些女人		
2018	Lobster Cop	龙虾刑警	Du Yufei	
2018	Shadow	影	Tian Zhan	
2019	The Big Shot	大人物	Sun Dasheng	
2019	My People, My Country	我和我的祖国		
2019	The Guilty Ones	你是凶手		
2020	The Eight Hundred	八佰	Yang Guai	
2020	Caught in Time	除暴		
2023	Faces in the Crowd	暴风	Wang Liwen	
2023	Flashover	惊天救援		
2023	The Procurator	检察风云		
TBA	The Old Guy	老家伙们		
TBA	Guns and Kidneys	枪炮腰花	Lao Fan	

=== Television series ===
Year	English title	Chinese title	Role	Notes/Ref.
1997		老三届		
1997		危情时刻	Liu Weiwei	
1998	Deadly Encounter	致命邂逅	Cui Ruihai	
1999		有爱的日子		
2000	The Truth	命案十三宗续集之真相		
2001		中关村风云	Ye Qingheng	
2001	Empty Mirror	空镜子	Chen Guoren	
2001	Taste of Love	爱情滋味	Wu Yousheng	
2002	Golden Lock Notes	金锁记	Lu Jianyun	
2004	Romantic Affairs	浪漫的事	Chen Hao	
2004	The Sea and Sky Boundless	海阔天高		
2005	Distance Zero	零距离	Wang Jiandong	
2005		男人女人向前走	Bai Mang	
2005		追赶我可能丢了的爱情	Wei Jinge	
2006	Daddy do not cry	爸爸,别哭		
2006		不能失去你	Ji Xiaodong	
2006		开盘	Business elite	
2007	Supreme Order	红色追击令	Luo Jiang	
2007		五号特工组	Qi Guanxiong	
2007		关中男人	Wang Changan	
2007	National treasure Jin Tianbao Box	国家宝藏之觐天宝匣	Xiao Jiannan	
2008		亲爱的敌人	Zhao Ou	
2009		三七撞上二十一	Gu Yaodong	
2010	Tunnel Warfare	地道战	Gao Chuanbao	
2010	Never Turns Head	永不回头	Zhang Hui	
2010	Resume Marriage	复婚	Xue Siping	
2010	The One	我是真的	Sang Yizhou	
2010	The Lying Lover	说谎的爱人	Song Dan	
2012		五湖四海	Wei Jinglin	
2012	Advance Even	先遣连	Li Qiusan	
2012		买房夫妻	Lan Guicheng	
2013	Editorial Department Story	新编辑部故事	Liu Xiangqian	
2013	Royalty in Blood	异镇	Li Congwen	
2014	Food to Pregnant	食来孕转	Shen Lidong	
2014	The Mekong River	湄公河大案	Gao Ye	
2014	The Honor of Family	家族荣誉		
2015	The Nanny Man	我爱男保姆	Wang Xueming	
2016	Winner	决胜	Kong Fang	
2017	The Battle at the Dawn	黎明决战	Cheng Qiang	
2017	Tribes and Empires: Storm of Prophecy	九州·海上牧云记	Muyun Luan	
2017	Monkey Stamps	猴票	Jian Weiguo	
2017	City of Smoke	决币	Li Daoren	
2019	Seven Days	七日生	Qiu Yongbang	
2020	Sisyphus	在劫难逃	Zhang Haifeng	
2020	The Justice	宣判		

== Awards and nominations ==
Year	Award	Category	Nominated work	Results	Ref.
2010	23rd Tokyo International Film Festival	Best Actor	The Piano in a Factory	Won	
2011	28th Golden Rooster Awards	Best Actor	The Piano in a Factory	Nominated	
2011	48th Golden Horse Film Festival and Awards	Best Actor	The Piano in a Factory	Nominated	
2011	8th China Movie Channel Media Awards	Best Actor	The Piano in a Factory	Won	
2011	18th Beijing College Student Film Festival	Best Actor	The Piano in a Factory	Nominated	
2011	7th Chinese American Film Festival	Best Actor	The Piano in a Factory	Won	
2012	12th Chinese Film Media Awards	Best Actor	The Piano in a Factory	Nominated	
2015	30th Golden Rooster Awards	Best Supporting Actor	Brotherhood of Blades	Nominated	
2015	52nd Golden Horse Film Festival and Awards	Best Supporting Actor	Saving Mr. Wu	Nominated	
2016	7th China Film Director's Guild Awards	Best Supporting Actor	Saving Mr. Wu	Nominated	
2016	16th Chinese Film Media Awards	Best Supporting Actor	Saving Mr. Wu	Won	
2016	23rd Beijing College Student Film Festival	Best Actor	Saving Mr. Wu	Nominated	
2017	31st Golden Rooster Awards	Best Supporting Actor	Saving Mr. Wu	Won	
2019	6th The Actors of China Awards	Best Actor (Sapphire Category)	Seven Days	Nominated	
