= This Is Me (film) =

- Poster
- Chinese: 年少轻狂
- Directed by: Dai Rui
- Starring: Michelle Chen; Zheng Kai; Bao Bei'er
- Production companies: Beijing Huayi Hongtai Media Development; Beijing Huashan Lunjian Entertainment
- Distributed by: Heng Ye Film Distribution; Beijing Huashan Lunjian Entertainment 新经典影视有限公司; Beijing Hengye Time Entertainment
- Release date: 13 November 2015
- Running time: 90 minutes
- Country: China
- Language: Mandarin
- Box office: CN¥12.9 million

This Is Me (Chinese: 年少轻狂) is a 2015 Chinese youth romantic comedy film directed by Dai Rui. It was released on 13 November 2015.

== Cast ==
- Michelle Chen
- Zheng Kai
- Bao Bei'er
- Oscar Sun
- Tang Yixin
- Wang Yongqiang
- Tracy
- Tong Jian-Kong
- Deng Mei-en
- Tom Price

== Reception ==
The film grossed CN¥9.6 million on its opening weekend at the Chinese box office.
