= Who Moved My Dream =

- Directed by: Wang Wei; Jackson Pat
- Written by: Lau Siu Kwan; Chau Ka Wai
- Produced by: Lau Siu Kwan
- Production companies: Ningbo Xingui Entertainment Co., Ltd; Huaxiang Group Co., Ltd; Yofoto Health Industry Co., Ltd. Guangzhou Yaochen Entertainment Co., Ltd
- Release date: December 11, 2014
- Running time: 90 minutes
- Country: China
- Language: Mandarin
- Box office: ¥0.72 million (China)

Who Moved My Dream (Chinese: 谁动了我的梦想) is a 2014 Chinese comedy drama romance film directed by Wang Wei and Jackson Pat. It was released on December 11 in China.

== Cast ==
- Leon Jay Williams
- Zhang Lanxin
- Hu Bing
- He Bin
- Kingdom Yuen
- Law Kar-ying
- Mark Cheng
- Viona Wang Xi-Yao
- Sabrina Qiu
- Zhang Yujie
- Cai Heng

== Box office ==
By December 12, 2014, the film had earned ¥0.72 million at the Chinese box office.
