= Saving Mr. Wu =

- Chinese film poster
- Traditional Chinese: 解救吾先生
- Simplified Chinese: 解救吾先生
- Hanyu Pinyin: Jiějiù Wú Xiānshēng
- Jyutping: Gaai2 Gau3 Ng4 Sin1 Saang1
- Directed by: Ding Sheng
- Screenplay by: Ding Sheng
- Produced by: Xiao Chen'an; Du Yang; Xiong Xiaolan; Preston Lee
- Starring: Andy Lau; Liu Ye; Wu Ruofu; Wang Qianyuan
- Cinematography: Ding Yu
- Edited by: Ding Sheng
- Music by: Lao Zai
- Production companies: Beijing Going Zoom Media; Shanghai New Media Group; Heyi Pictures; Beijing Motianlun Media
- Distributed by: Golden Network Asia (Worldwide)
- Release dates: 26 September 2015 (SRIFF); 30 September 2015 (China)
- Running time: 106 minutes
- Country: China
- Language: Mandarin
- Box office: US$31.2 million

Saving Mr. Wu, (Chinese: 解救吾先生), previously known as The Strongest Competitor (Chinese: 最強對手), is a 2015 Chinese action crime thriller film directed by Ding Sheng and starring Andy Lau, Liu Ye, Wu Ruofu and Wang Qianyuan. The film was based on a true abduction case where cast member Wu Ruofu was the victim.

== Plot ==
Ruthless criminal Zhang Hua (Wang Qianyuan) and his gang impersonate as police officers to abduct wealthy businessmen. Setting a trap outside a Beijing karaoke club, they hit the jackpot with Hong Kong film star Mr Wu (Andy Lau), forcing him into their car on the pretext of being investigated for a hit-and-run.

In the Beijing suburbs, Wu is bound, gagged and beaten into compliance by Zhang's men. Then Wu is made to witness the execution of Xiao Dou (Cai Lu), Zhang's last abducted victim, who failed to have his ransom paid within 24 hours. Wu steps in to save him, promising to pay both men's ransoms.

To ensure he is not delivered as a corpse, Wu makes a call to his old friend Mr. Su (Lam Suet) and asks him to ensure that he is alive before delivering RMB3 million. Wu's calm, intelligence and dignity in the face of death earns Zhang's respect. Zhang leaves for the city in morning, instructing his gang to kill both victims at 9pm if they do not hear from him.

Meanwhile, police vice captain Xing Feng (Liu Ye) and captain Cao Gang (Wu Ruofu) have formed an anti-kidnap task force. After a series of tip-offs, they detain Zhang when he leaves the apartment of his mistress, Chenchen (Vivien Li). But Zhang refuses to give up Wu's location without a pardon. As 9pm approaches, the police stage a final desperate rescue attempt based on an unreliable tip as the kidnapping gang, fearing they'll be Zhang's next victims, decides to kill the hostages before the deadline. The police break into the house as the gang is strangling the hostages, narrowly saving both Wu and Dou.

== Cast ==
- Andy Lau as Mr. Wu (吾先生), a Hong Kong film star and the abducted victim
- Liu Ye as Xing Feng (邢峰), a police vice-captain
- Wu Ruofu as Cao Gang (曹剛), a police captain
- Wang Qianyuan as Zhang Hua (張華), leader of the abductors
- Lam Suet as Mr. Su (蘇先生), a friend of Mr. Wu
- Zhao Xiaoyue as Zhang Yi (張總), a police commander
- Vivien Li as Chenchen (陳晨), Zhang Hua's girlfriend
- Cai Lu as Xiao Dou (小竇), another victim abducted by Zhang Hua
- Yu Ailei as Cang (倉哥), an abductor
- Ma Sichun (cameo)

== Production ==
Production of Saving Mr. Wu was kept at a low profile and was first revealed when actor Liu Ye wrote in his Sina Weibo account that he was working on a film with Andy Lau. In early January 2015, location shots were being filmed in Sanlitun, Beijing. On 26 January, location shoots were done at Pinggu District where Lau was spotted by reporters and fans. On 9 February, it was announced that production of the film had officially wrapped up.

== Release ==
On 8 February 2015, the teaser poster of the film was unveiled at the 65th Berlin International Film Festival. In May 2015, another teaser poster was unveiled 68th Cannes Film Festival displaying an international release date of October 2015.

== Box office ==
As of 27 October 2015, the film has grossed a total of US$31,212,702 worldwide, combining its box office gross from China, Hong Kong, Malaysia, North America and Singapore.

== Awards and nominations ==
Awards and nominations
| Ceremony | Category | Recipient | Outcome |
|---|---|---|---|
| 2nd Silk Road International Film Festival | Feature Film of the Year | Saving Mr. Wu | Won |
| 2nd Silk Road International Film Festival | Best Actor | Andy Lau | Won |
| 52nd Golden Horse Awards | Best Supporting Actor | Wang Qianyuan | Nominated |
| 52nd Golden Horse Awards | Best Film Editing | Ding Sheng | Nominated |
| 12th Chinese American Film Festival | Golden Angel Award Film | Saving Mr. Wu | Won |
| 31st Golden Rooster Awards | Best Supporting Actor | Wang Qianyuan | Won |
| 31st Golden Rooster Awards | Best Cinematography | Ding Yuan | Nominated |
| 31st Golden Rooster Awards | Best Editing | Ding Sheng | Won |
