= CZ12 =

2012 Chinese-Hong Kong film by Jackie Chan

- Theatrical release poster

Chinese name
- Traditional Chinese: 十二生肖
- Simplified Chinese: 十二生肖
Transcriptions
Standard Mandarin
- Hanyu Pinyin: Shí-èr Shēngxiāo
Yue: Cantonese
- Jyutping: Sap6 Ji6 Sang1 Ciu3
- Directed by: Jackie Chan
- Screenplay by: Jackie Chan; Stanley Tong; Frankie Chan; Edward Tang
- Produced by: Jackie Chan; Zhang Dajun; Barbie Tung; Esmond Ren; Albert Lee; Wang Zhonglei
- Starring: Jackie Chan; Kwon Sang-woo; Liao Fan; Anna Yao; Zoe Zhang; Laura Weissbecker; Lay Zhang
- Cinematography: Jackie Chan; Horace Wong; Ng Man-ching; Ben Knott
- Edited by: Yau Chi-wai
- Music by: Nathan Wang; Gary Chase
- Production companies: Huayi Brothers; Emperor Motion Pictures; Jackie & JJ Productions; Shanghai Film Group
- Distributed by: Huayi Brothers Media Corporation; Emperor Motion Pictures
- Release dates: 12 December 2012 (Gala premier); 20 December 2012 (China, Hong Kong)
- Running time: 123 minutes
- Countries: China; Hong Kong
- Languages: Mandarin; English; French
- Budget: US$26 million
- Box office: US$171.3 million

CZ12 (Chinese: 十二生肖; pinyin: Shí-èr Shēngxiāo), also known as Armour of God III: Chinese Zodiac and Chinese Zodiac, is a 2012 action adventure comedy film co-written, co-produced and directed by Jackie Chan, who also starred as the main character in the film. A Chinese-Hong Kong co-production, the film is the third film of a franchise that began with Armour of God (1986) and its sequel, Armour of God II: Operation Condor (1991). The film co-stars Kwon Sang-woo, Liao Fan, Zoe Zhang, Anna Yao and Laura Weissbecker.

The plot follows treasure hunter JC (Chan) and his team who set out on a global quest to find a set of Chinese zodiac bronze heads that were stolen from a Beijing palace in the 19th century. Released on 20 December 2012, the film went on to gross over US$145 million at the Chinese box office and US$171 million worldwide with mixed-to-negative reviews from critics. The film won Best Stunt Action Choreography for Chan at the 32nd Hong Kong Film Awards. Chan also earned two Guinness World Records with the film for "Most Stunts Performed by a Living Actor" and "Most Credits in One Movie".

A sequel, and the fourth film in the Armour of God series, Armour of God IV: Ultimatum, is expected to be released in 2027.

== Plot ==
The Old Summer Palace was looted and burnt by a combined Anglo-French expeditionary force during the Second Opium War. Among the artifacts stolen are twelve bronze heads of the animals of the Chinese zodiac.

In the present day, the bronze heads, supplied by MP Corporation are all auctioned. JC is tasked by MP to find the remaining lost bronze heads, with a promise of a 10 million dollar bonus, if he can recover all of them, including the Dragon. He visits Professor Guan, who had created 12 identical replicas for study purposes with his team of researchers, under the guise of a reporter named Martin from National Geographic.

JC scans the animal heads using special gloves so that his secret organisation can replicate an extremely realistic model of them. After scanning, he goes to Paris to find a woman named Coco, recommended by Guan, for more information on the whereabouts of two bronze heads. JC and his partners infiltrate a mansion to find two of the bronze heads. JC manages to decode the password to a top secret vault and finds the bronze heads, a painting called "The Roses", along with many other valuable national treasures thought to be lost inside and manages to evade capture with all the valuables despite being busted. However, he is spotted by Coco. Having no time to explain himself, he tells Coco to meet him at a boat house while fleeing from the mansion's security.

At the boat house, Martin tells Coco that he is working for a secret corporation that is trying to recover all the lost relics for China. The guards from the mansion storm the boat house and try to attack JC, but the police are called in and they are all arrested. JC, Coco and Simon are cleared of any wrongdoing and are released. JC and his team are invited to a castle owned by a lady named Catherine, unaware that the guards from the mansion are tailing them out of suspicion. It turns out that the captain of the "Indestructible", one of the ships involved in the destruction of the Old Summer Palace, is Catherine's great-great-grandfather. This upsets Coco, who confronts Catherine on it. JC and his team find many treasures in the castle, including the bronze head of the Rooster, and hatch a series of plans to ferry them out.

JC promises Catherine that he will help her locate her great-great-grandfather's remains. The next day, they venture out in search of the Indestructible's treasures, located on a seemingly uninhabited island. JC instructs Coco and Catherine to stay behind while his team explore the island. Coco and Catherine however disobey JC's orders to look for the remains on their own. They get entangled among the vines, forcing JC to rescue them. While exhuming the great-great grandfather's remains, the group accidentally discovers the remains of the Indestructible, several more bronze heads and a large quantity of gold. As they prepare to leave with all the artifacts, the guards from the mansion confront them. In turn, the island's local inhabitants, a group of pirates, appear and promptly capture everyone.

JC and his team fight their way through, escaping the island via a log set up with a pulley system, leaving the five guards with the pirates. On the yacht, Coco accidentally discovers the real motive of JC's ventures and confronts him. The log carrying approximately eight tonnes of gold sinks. Nevertheless, JC and his team still get rewarded for recovering some of the lost bronze heads. The group are enraged when they find out that the supposedly-missing Dragon head was already at the hands of MP Corp all along, thereby making it impossible to claim the large bonus. Coco and her fellow students' protests over the sale of the national treasures escalate quickly and capture worldwide attention. As Coco's students try to find out more about MP Corp, three of them, including Coco's younger brother, are captured.

After Coco asks JC for help, JC contacts MP Corp on the availability of "The Roses" painting and is allowed into the secret premises. Having toured the entire factory where almost exact duplicates of the relics are made to be sold as real relics in auctions, JC deduces the location of the captives. He challenges a long time rival who happens to be there as well — unscrupulous treasure hunter, Vulture, to a fight but it ends in a stalemate. JC bargains with MP Corp to sell "The Roses" at a discounted price and secure the release of the three hostages. When MP Corp refuses, JC fights his way to the chamber. A furnace explodes due to a guard's baton rupturing one of the pipes, destroying most of the facility. JC then settles for the release of the three hostages in exchange for the painting and not paying damages done to the premises.

Meanwhile, the Dragon bronze head is expected to fetch the highest price; however, no one bids for it due to increasing pressure from activist groups. MP Corp, to teach these groups a lesson, threatens to throw the relic into an active volcano, calling the mission "Let the Dragon Fly", if no bids are received by noon the next day. The deadline passes without a single bid and Vulture leads a group of three sky divers to throw the relic into the volcano. JC intervenes in order to save the relic from dropping into the volcano, and is severely injured in the ensuing airborne struggle. As a mark of respect, Vulture hands over the relic to a sprawled JC. MP Corp's owners are arrested on possession of "The Roses" painting. JC is seen recovering in a hospital and on good terms with everyone, including Vulture, and also reunites with his wife, who visits him in the hospital.

== Cast ==
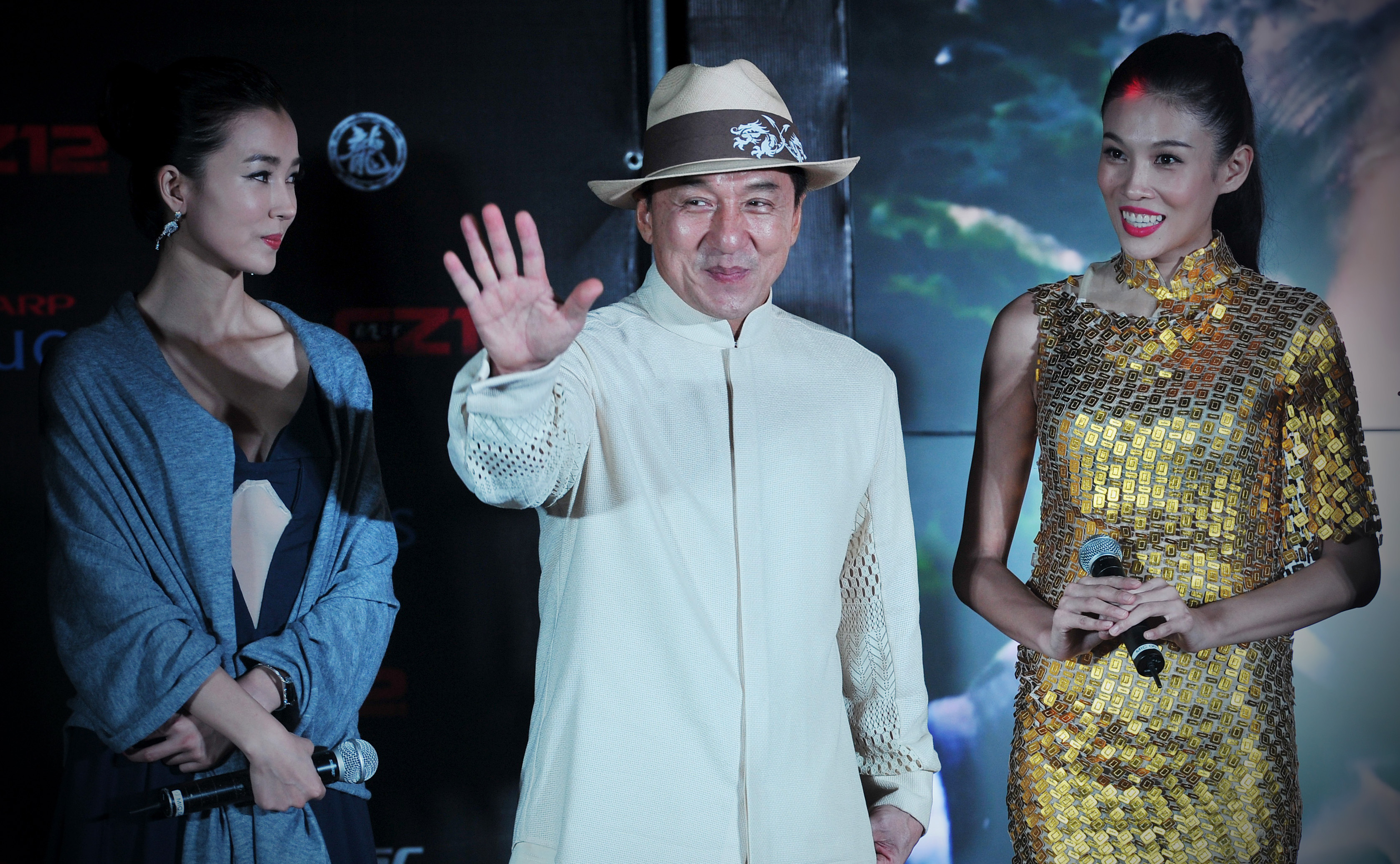
Jackie Chan with co-stars Zhang Lanxin and Helen Yao at a promotional event for CZ12.

- Jackie Chan as JC a.k.a. Martin/Asian Hawk
- Kwon Sang-woo as Simon
- Liao Fan as David
- Helen Yao as Coco
- Zhang Lanxin as Bonnie
- Laura Weissbecker as Catherine de Sichel
- John Paisley as Sir Charlton
- Pierre-Benoist Varoclier as Léon
- Jonathan Lee as Himself
- Vincent Sze as Michael Morgan
- David Torok as Bodyguard of Michael Morgan
- Max Huang as Bodyguard of Michael Morgan
- Alaa Safi as Vulture
- Pierre Bourdaud as Pirate
- Emmanuel Lanzi as Henchman
- Rosario Amadeo as Pierre
- Wilson Chen as Wu Qing
- Steve Yoo as Pirate Chief
- Ken Lo as Pirate
- Oliver Platt as Lawrence Morgan
- David Serero as the bodyguard
- Caitlin Dechelle as Katie
- Marc Canonizado as Marc
- Zheng Wei
- Bo-yee Poon as Lawrence's Assistant
- Abdul Haviz
- Ashok CA
- Shu Qi as David's wife (cameo)
- Daniel Wu as Doctor (cameo)
- Joan Lin as JC's wife (cameo)
- Kenny G as Airplane pilot (cameo)

== Production ==
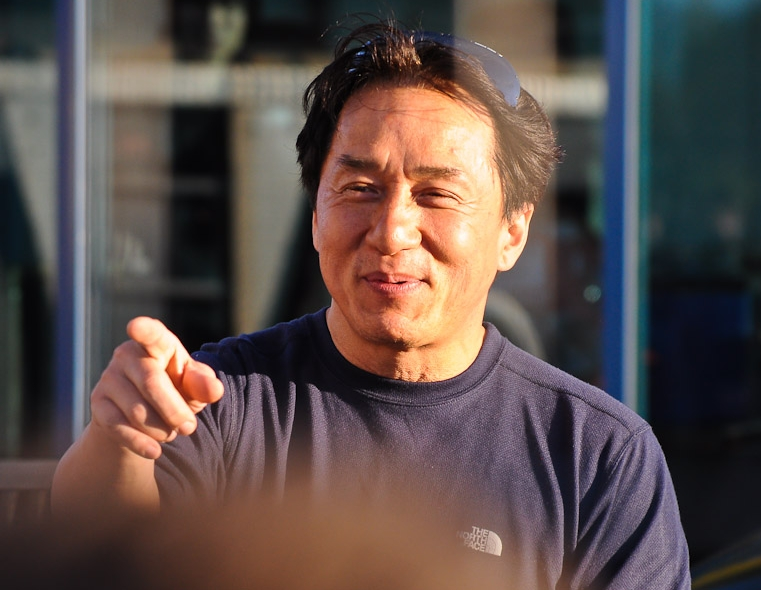
Jackie Chan on the set at Jelgava, Latvia.

Principal photography began on 5 June 2011. From 18 April to 2 May 2012, Jackie Chan filmed several scenes in the Aerodium Latvia vertical wind tunnel in Jelgava, Latvia. Filming also took place in France, China, Taiwan and Vanuatu. Chan did most of the stunts and fight scenes himself with little support from his stunt team. Jean-Yves Blondeau, the inventor of the skate suit, trained Chan to use the suit for the film's body blading sequence. This film was simultaneously made in IMAX 3D. Filming officially wrapped up on 8 May the same year.

== Release ==
The gala premier of the film was held on 12 December 2012; it was released across Asia on 20 December and in India on 28 December.

=== U.S. release ===
CZ12 was originally scheduled for release in U.S. theaters sometime in the summer of 2013 with about 20 minutes edited out by Jackie Chan himself in order to optimize the pace and content for North American audiences. This release date was pushed back to the fall; the re-edited version was released on 18 October for theatrical exhibit exclusively by AMC Theatres.

== Reception ==
In competition with films from abroad CZ12 grossed HK$11.7 million (US$1.5 million), as well as becoming the top-ranked Chinese film at the Taiwan box office. The film debuted second in mainland China (after Lost in Thailand), going on to gross over US$145 million at the box office and emerging to be one of the highest grossing domestic films in China.

=== Awards and nominations ===
- 32nd Hong Kong Film Awards
  - Won: Best Action Choreography (Jackie Chan, He Jun)
  - Nominated: Best New Performer (Zhang Lanxin)
  - Nominated: Best Film Editing (Yau Chi-wai)
  - Nominated: Best Visual Effects (Han Young-woo, Victor Wong, Patrick Chui, Seong Ho-jang)
- Guinness World Records
  - Won: Most credits in one movie (Jackie Chan)
  - Won: Most Stunts by a Living Actor (Jackie Chan)
- 9th Huading Awards
  - Won: Best Director (Jackie Chan)
  - Won: Best Newcomer (Zhang Lanxin)
  - Won: Best Action Choreography (JC Stunt Team)

=== Criticism ===
Time Out Hong Kong gave the film two stars out of five referring to the film as "a pedestrian film by any measure aside from its action design". The South China Morning Post gave the film one and a half stars out of five, noting that "CZ12 lumbers like a cheap DVD knock-off of one of [Jackie Chan's] old classics" and "CZ12 is like watching a former star athlete struggle in a meaningless game".

The Hollywood Reporter also gave a negative review, noting the film's length and the lack of martial arts and stunts that star Chan is known for. Variety gave the film a negative review as well, stating "Jackie Chan emerges a Jackie-of-all-trades and master of none in [CZ12]".

== See also ==
- Jackie Chan filmography
- List of Hong Kong films
