= Run for Love =

- Official poster
- Traditional Chinese: 奔愛
- Simplified Chinese: 奔爱
- Hanyu Pinyin: Bēn Ài
- Directed by: Zhang Yibai; Guan Hu; Zhang Meng; Teng Huatao; Gao Qunshu
- Screenplay by: Bao Jingjing; Gao Qunshu; Ge Rui; Gu Xiaobai; Guan Hu; Tristan Jian; Ya Liu; Yu Pan
- Story by: Megan Tay
- Produced by: Xu Wen; Crystal Gong Chun; Michael Ren; Christy Wang
- Starring: Zhang Ziyi; Eddie Peng; Tong Liya; Zhou Dongyu; Michelle Chen; Zhang Yi; Liang Jing; Wang Qianyuan; Wu Mochou; Ece Aydın
- Cinematography: Liu Yin; Sun Ming; Yu Zhang; Jeremy Zhou; Li Bingqiang
- Music by: An Wei
- Production companies: Beijing Wynn Culture & Media; Shannan Guangxian Pictures; Chuandi Guangnian Entertainment; Huayi Brothers; Shenzhen Huiye Goldstone Management Company; Wuhan Xinghao Film & Culture; Beijing Monster Pictures; Chengdu Zhiyou Culture Communication Company; Wang Yuelun Studio; Beijing Yixiang Tiankai Media
- Release date: February 14, 2016 (China)
- Running time: 137 minutes
- Country: China
- Language: Mandarin

Run for Love is a 2016 Chinese romance anthology film directed by Zhang Yibai, Guan Hu, Zhang Meng, Teng Huatao, and Gao Qunshu, featuring five love stories respectively in Japan, United States, Norway, Turkey and Saipan. It was released in China on February 14, 2016.

== Plot ==
Five different love stories pan out as five different couples run into something that will change their lives.

In “So Long, My Love,” Su Le Qi (Zhang Ziyi) arrives in Japan after reading about the country in her ex's letters. She meets apprentice chef Feng Yu Jian (Eddie Peng), who offers to show her around Hokkaido.

In “Homeward Journey,” couple Tang Jing (Liang Jing) and Zhou Hong Yi (Zhang Yi) are on a family tour in Turkey. While visiting Istanbul, they lose their five-year-old daughter in the gargantuan market of the Grand Bazaar. As they frantically search for their daughter, the true problems of their marriage come to light.

In “Nothing Like Romance,” Chicago resident Guan Yue (Wu Mo Chou) spends life with her American husband Lu Jie (Wang Qian Yuan), whom she married for a green card. When she finds out that she is on her last breaths, Guan Yue convinces Lu Hie to join her on a 2,300 mile drive along Route 66 to Los Angeles, on a journey that will forever change the couple.

In “Artificial Sunlight,” Nurse Lily (Michelle Chen) hasn't visited her homeland in five years. She accepts a nursing job at an old home in Rjukan, Norway. She also meets and develops feelings for local lawyer Andrews (Sebastian Stiger). When one of Lily's dying patients mentions that she just wants to see the sun in the perpetually dark Rjukan, Lily and Andrews decide to find a way to fulfill this final wish.

In “Stolen Heart,” actress Ye Lan (Tong Li Ya) lives in Saipan, a small island near Guam. She is repeatedly haunted by memories of a tragic event from her past. One day, she meets mysterious young woman named Bai Qie Zi (Zhou Dong Yu). Bai Qie Zi claims to know a lot about Ye Lan, and is more than a little interested in the actress. What follows is a blast from Ye Lan's past that she never expected.

== Cast ==
=== Japan ===
- Director: Zhang Yibai
- Zhang Ziyi
- Eddie Peng

=== Norway ===
- Director: Teng Huatao
- Michelle Chen
- Sebastian Stigar
- Per Christian Ellefsen
- Janny Hoff Brekke
- Sigmund Sæverud
- Trond Halbo
- Geir Tangen

=== Saipan ===
- Director: Gao Qunshu
- Zhou Dongyu
- Tong Liya

=== United States ===
- Director: Zhang Meng
- Wang Qianyuan
- Wu Mochou
- Brian Rooney

=== Turkey ===
- Director: Guan Hu
- Liang Jing
- Zhang Yi

== See also ==
- Cities in Love (2015), Chinese film with similar premise
