= Wan Wan =

Taiwanese cartoonist, blogger, illustrator, and actress

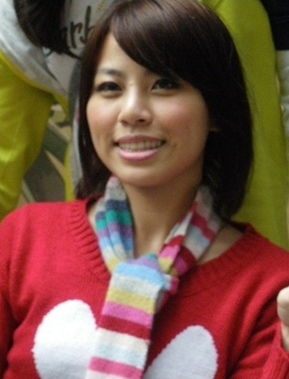
- Born: Hu Chia-wei; 16 August 1981 (age 44); Taiwan
- Occupations: Cartoonist; illustrator; actress

Chinese name
- Traditional Chinese: 彎彎
- Simplified Chinese: 弯弯
Transcriptions
Standard Mandarin
- Hanyu Pinyin: Wān Wān

Hu Chia-wei (Chinese: 胡家瑋; pinyin: Hú Jiāwěi), better known by her pen name Wan Wan (Chinese: 彎彎; pinyin: Wān Wān) is a Taiwanese cartoonist, illustrator, and actress.

One of the most well-known online illustrators in Taiwan. She is also the first blogger to participate in a commercial advertisement and film, You Are the Apple of My Eye.

== Career ==
- 2004 Debuts by creating her stories based on daily office work, and implements them into MSN Live Messenger icons. Soon, it became the first blog with more than a billion views.
- 2005 First Book Wan Wan's Doodle Diary: My Dull Work sold more than 50,000 copies in the first two weeks.
- Winner of China Time Blogger Award
- Winner of Kingstone Person of the year
- Collaborated with Family Mart in sticker collecting for Wan Wan's special magnet sets, a total of 50 million sets of promos being distributed, Family Mart made more one billion dollars of revenue from this collaboration.
- 2006 Winner of the 2nd China Time Blogger Award for Humor and Fun
- 2007 Winner of Best Illustrator by Better Life Monthly
- 2009 Winner of Yahoo! Most Popular Blogger Rewards
- 2010 EU Goodwill Ambassador and published Wan Wan's Travel Journal 2: Let's go to Europe.
- 2010 Supporting Role in Giddens Ko's movie, You are the Apple of My Eye.
- 2011 Happiness- Here I come! Wan Wan's 20 Joyful Ideas was selected as the 10th and 11th Best Book of the Year by Hong Kong Reading City
- 2013 First illustrator launched her own LINE Sticker and Line Camera Stamp Sticker. Until 2013, collaboration with Zespri Kiwifruit on commercial Line Sticker, more than 6 million downloads, later they launched 2 more collections
- 2014 Winner of Outstanding Blogger rewarded by PIXNET.
- Join work with singer Yang Cheng Lin at 2008 publish “Fun Fun: That is how we met” and celebrity Kevin Tsai in 2014 published “Kevin Tsai's Way of Speaking 2” (as Illustrator).
- 2014 First Taiwan illustrator to launch her own paid Line Sticker.
- 2018 Total 11 paid Line stickers, accumulated more than 100 million downloads.

== Works ==
Wan Wan has written 22 titles,
| Year | English title | Mandarin Title | ISBN |
|---|---|---|---|
| Nov 2006 | Wan Wan's Doodle Diary: My Dull Work | 《可不可以不要上班——彎彎塗鴉日記1》 | 978-957-28747-3-8 |
| July 2006 | Wan Wan's Doodle Diary 2 : Every Little things | 《一起蹺班去——彎彎塗鴉日記2》 | 978-957-28747-5-2 |
| Sep 2006 | Wan Wan's Doodle Diary 3 : My High School Life | 《可不可以不要上學——彎彎塗鴉日記3》 | 978-986-83330-0-0 |
| Nov 2006 | Wan Wan's First Anniversary Collection | 還在背書包的時候：彎彎出書一週年紀念畫冊 | 978-957-28747-7-6 |
| Jul 2006 | Fun Fun: That is how we met (Join work with Singer Yang Cheng Lin) | Fun Fun馬後炮 | 978-9861332-4-3-7 |
| Nov 2006 | Wan Wan's Travel Journal: Travel Memories | 《可不可以天天出去玩——彎彎旅行日記1》 | 978-986-83330-1-7 |
| Apr 2008 | Wan Wan's Doodle Diary 4: All the little things | 《要不要來我家——彎彎塗鴉日記4》 | 978-986-83330-1-7 |
| Dec 2009 | Fresher to Work: Say No to Comfortable Jobs | 《可不可以不要鐵飯碗——彎彎各行各業初體驗》 | 978-986-85784-1-8 |
| Jan 2010 | I'm Wan Wan's Mom | 《彎家有娘初長成》與彎娘合作 | 978-986-13331-4-4 |
| Jan 2010 | Wan Wan's Doodle Diary 5: Pardon My Blopper | 《可不可以不要NG——彎彎塗鴉日記5》附DVD | 978-988-19607-1-9 |
| Oct 2010 | Wan Wan's Travel Journal 2 :Let's go to Europe | 《歐洲GO了沒——彎彎旅行日記2》 | 978-986-86839-0-7 |
| Dec 2010 | Wan Wan's Doodle Diary 6: Being Childish!? | 《可不可以繼續幼稚！？——彎彎塗鴉日記6》 | 978-986-86839-8-3 |
| Aug 2011 | Happiness- Here I come ! Wan Wan's 20 joyful ideas | 《轉個彎，怎樣都幸福——彎彎的生活小語》 | 978-986-86839-3-8 |
| Dec 2011 | Wan Wan's School Diary: This is how we grow up | 《我們都是這樣彎大的——彎彎校園抒壓日記》 | 978-986-13339-6-0 |
| Dec 2011 | Wan Wan's Doodle Diary 6: Being Childish!? | 《可不可以繼續幼稚！？——彎彎塗鴉日記6》 | 978-986-86839-8-3 |
| Dec 2012 | Wan Wan's Travel Journal 2: In love with Taipei | 《彎彎不歪腰玩樂筆記》 | 978-986-325-070-8 |
| Jul 2013 | Wan Wan's School Diary: This is how we grow up II A Magic APP | 《我們都是這樣彎大的之彎彎的魔法APP》 | 978-986-13346-3-9 |
| Mar 2014 | Wan Wan's Pet Diary: My Pets | 《可不可以一直在一起：彎彎寵物日記》 | 978-986-88755-7-9 |
| Apr 2014 | Kevin Tsai's Way of Speaking 2 (as Illustrator) | 《蔡康永的說話之道2》 | 978-986-13639-0-5 |
| Aug 2015 | Things to Challenge! | 《可不可以勇敢挑戰：彎彎的應援，為自己Fight again！》 | 978-986-92021-0-7 |
| Jan 2017 | Mini Wan Wan: I'm Mom Now! | 《阿娘喂！我就這樣當媽了：彎兒小圓仔報到日記》 | 978-957-10699-75 |
| Jan 2018 | Wan Wan's Recommendation: Best desert in Taipei! | 《彎彎甜點筆記：彎風正甜！來喔~一起發現台北美味甜食店》 | 978-957-56406-6-8 |

== Filmography ==
=== Film ===
| Year | English title | Original title | Role | Notes |
|---|---|---|---|---|
| 2011 | You Are the Apple of My Eye | 那些年，我們一起追的女孩 | Hu Chia-wei | |
