= Laura Weissbecker =

French-American actress, comedian, writer and producer

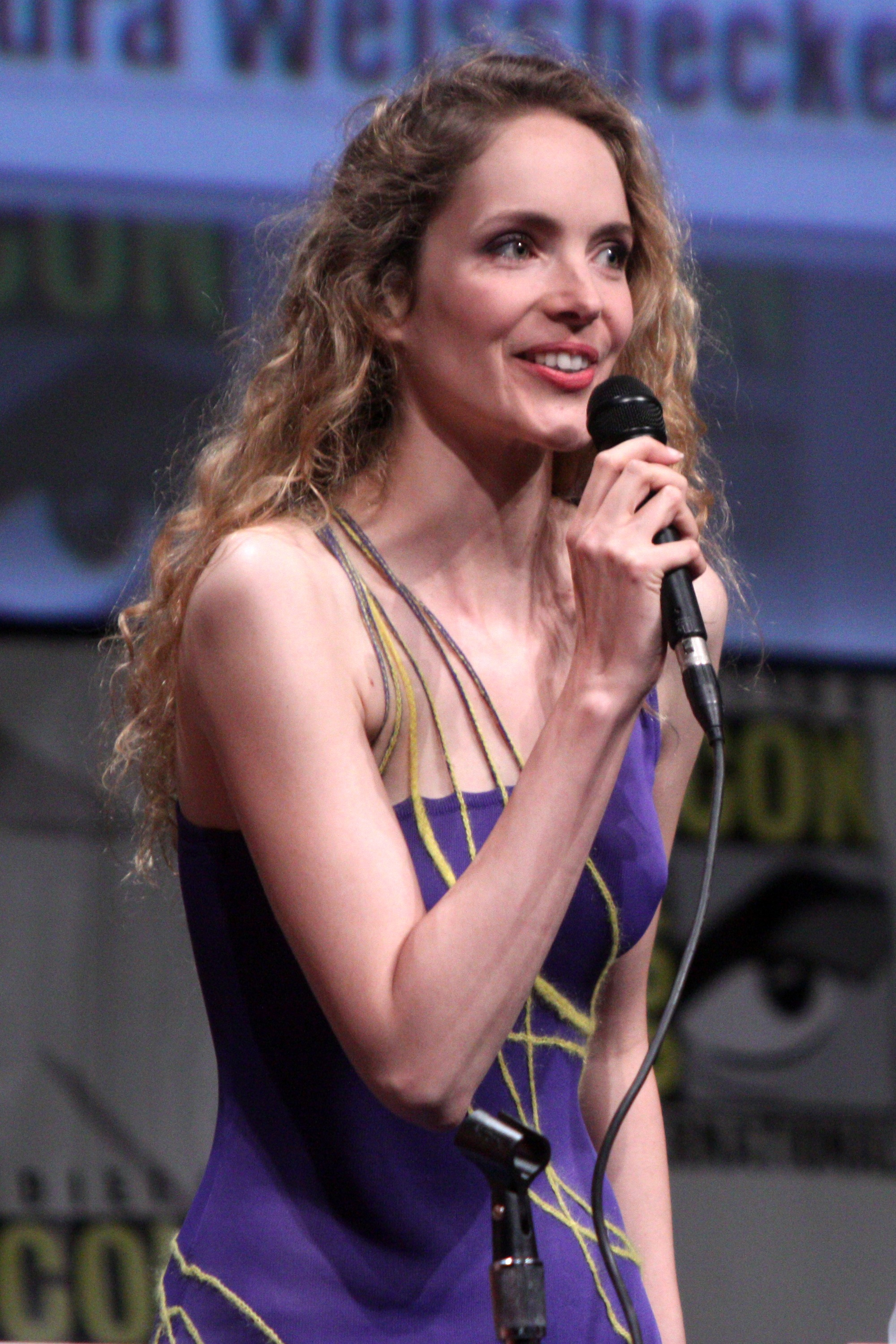
- Weissbecker at San Diego Comic-Con in July 2012
- Born: 3 October 1984 (age 41); Strasbourg, France
- Occupation: Actress
- Years active: 2002–present

Laura Weissbecker (born October 3, 1984) is an international multilingual French-American actress, comedian, writer and producer. She is the recipient of numerous awards, including the Chinese Huading award for best new actress in 2013 for her role in Jackie Chan's CZ12. She has worked in France, Germany, USA and China, with directors such as Jackie Chan, Cedric Klapisch, Elie Chouraqui, Mark Romanek and Tonie Marshall. Weissbecker was chosen by Jackie Chan for one of the leading roles in the film Chinese Zodiac 12, starring and directed by Jackie Chan. The film was a huge commercial success in Asia, in particular in mainland China where it is listed as amongst the top 5 biggest box-office hits for 2012.

== Personal life ==
Weissbecker grew up in the east of France, in the city of Strasbourg, surrounded by a very heteroclite and European environment. She has a brother and a sister, who is a solo aerial artist with Cirque du Soleil.

== Film career ==
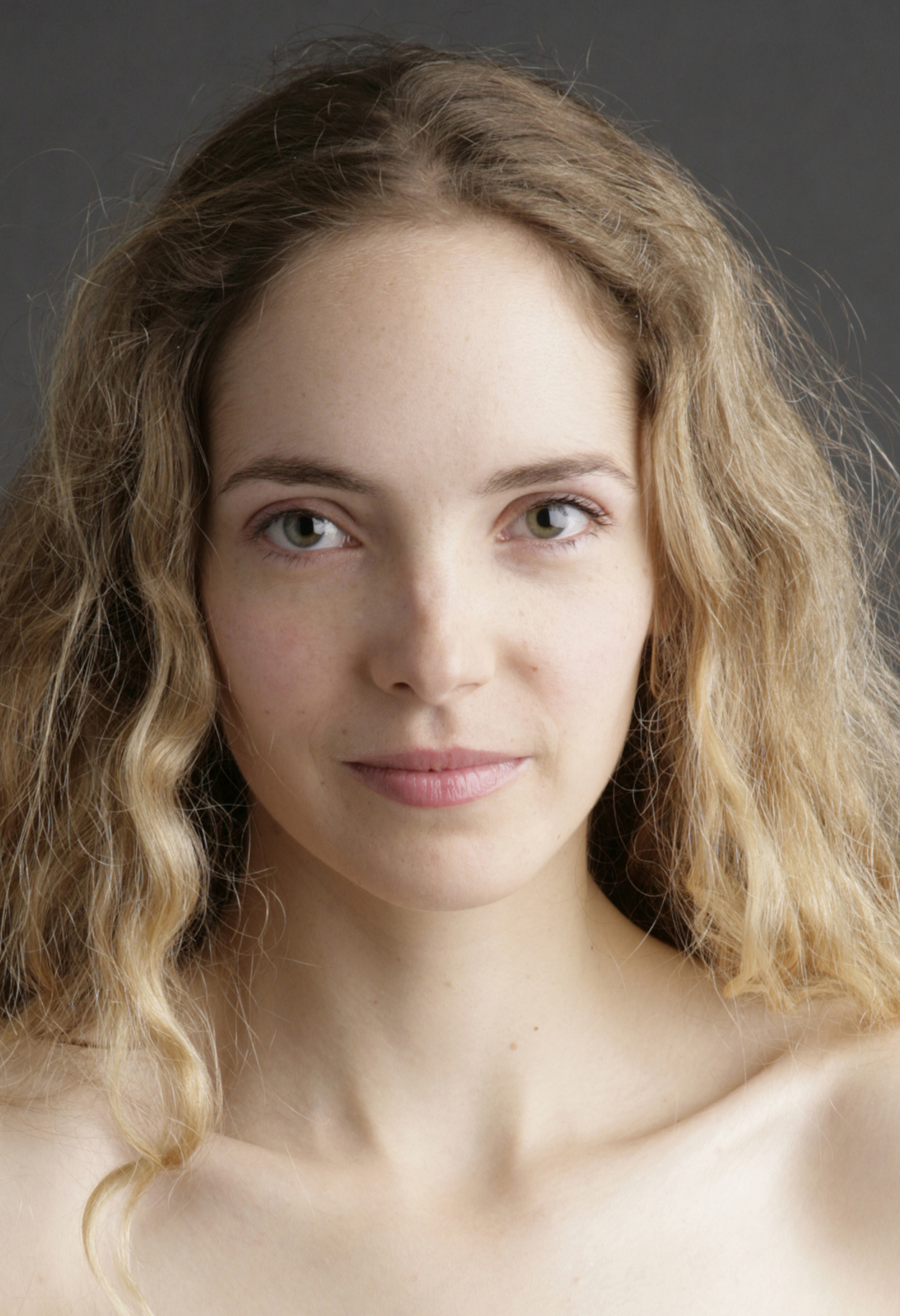
Weissbecker in January 2009

Weissbecker began her film career in 2002, when director Tonie Marshall (winner of the 2000 Cesar French Academy Award for best film, best director and best screenwriter) offered her a small role opposite Francois Cluzet in her feature film ‘’France Boutique’’.

In France, Weissbecker is best known for her role in ‘’Versailles, the Dream of a King’’ directed by Thierry Binisti, a TV movie which aired on France 2, Japan (NHK) and UK (BBC), and her role in ‘’Russian Dolls" directed by Cedric Klapisch (also starring Audrey Tautou, Romain Duris, Cecile de France).

A multilingual actress, Weissbecker was featured in a German TV movie Love Hurts directed by German TV director Rolf Silber, which was shot in Berlin.

She shows her comedic talent starring opposite Jackie Chan in ‘’Chinese Zodiac 12,’’ an international feature film directed by Chan. Weissbecker was awarded ‘’Best New Global Actress’’ at the Chinese Huading awards in Macao in October 2013 for her performance.

In the US, she had a recurring role in the Amazon-Sony TV series "Mad Dogs".

In 2019, she studied boxing and MMA for a role in the Chinese movie "My Hero" directed by Fan Haolun. Weissbecker was awarded Best Supporting Actress at the Vancouver Chinese Film festival for this role.

She also played in Mandarin and French in the movie "the Pink Thief" directed by Mustafa Ozgun.

During the COVID-19 pandemic, Weissbecker has written several comedy sketches in which she executes a parody of Melania Trump.

In 2022, she was in the movie Covid 19 Ground Zero based on the true story of hospital workers in New York City. The movie has been awarded Best Foreign Film at the Sant Andreu de la Barca Festival in Barcelona, Best Cinematography and Best Story at the Focus International Film festival, as well as nominations for Best Actress and other categories. The film made its US premiere at the Chelsea Film Festival in New York. It was included in the Festival of Colmar and the San Diego French Film Festival 2023 of which she was the patron.

== Books ==
Weissbecker's first book, a memoir entitled "How I became Chinese" was published in France end of 2016; the book won the award the Prix du Lys. The book was translated into Mandarin and published in China end of 2018 under the title "Studying to become Chinese"

== Education ==
Weissbecker has a master's degree from one of the top engineering schools in France. She was trained in Los Angeles with leading acting coach Howard Fine and studied as well with Larry Moss, Jack Waltzer and comedy master Gary Austin, founder of the Groundlings, an established improvisation troupe. Weissbecker is fluent in French, English, Chinese and German.

== Awards ==
Weissbecker has been part of the jury of Shanghai film festival 2013.

Laura won the Best Emerging Global Actress of Huading Awards. Nicole Kidman won the Best Global Actress award at the same Huading Awards ceremony.

The 10th Huading Awards Global Entertainment Celebrities Satisfaction Survey Release Ceremony, hosted by Global Talents Media Group and Macao Foundation, was held on 7 October 2013 (Monday) in Macao, China. Great congratulation that Laura has nominated for the "Best Emerging Global Actress" of 10th Huading Awards, and she attended the ceremony where she received her first Chinese award and gave her acceptance speech in Chinese.
