= Durian Durian =

2000 Hong Kong film by Fruit Chan

- Movie poster for Durian Durian

Chinese name
- Traditional Chinese: 榴槤飄飄
- Simplified Chinese: 榴莲飘飘
- Literal meaning: Durian fluttering in the wind
Transcriptions
Standard Mandarin
- Hanyu Pinyin: liúlián piāopiāo
Yue: Cantonese
- Jyutping: Lau4 Lin4 Piu1 Piu1
- Directed by: Fruit Chan
- Written by: Fruit Chan; Chan Wai Keung; Zhi Min Sheng
- Produced by: Carrie Wong
- Starring: Qin Hailu; Mak Wai Fan
- Cinematography: Lam Wah Chuen
- Edited by: Fruit Chan (as Tin Sam Fat)
- Music by: Chu Hing Cheung; Lam Wah Chuen
- Production companies: Golden Network Asia; Nice Top Entertainment; Wild Bunch; Des Films; StudioCanal
- Release date: 16 November 2000
- Running time: 116 minutes
- Country: Hong Kong
- Languages: Cantonese; Mandarin
- Box office: HKD523,015

Durian Durian (Chinese: 榴槤飄飄) is a 2000 Hong Kong film directed by Fruit Chan. The film portrays the experiences of a young girl, Fan (Mak Wai-Fan), and her sex worker neighbour, Yan (Qin Hailu), in Hong Kong. The film was selected to compete for the Golden Lion at the 57th Venice International Film Festival.

== Plot ==
Yan is a prostitute from the mainland in Hong Kong, living near Fan and her family, who are staying in the area illegally. Yan meets Fan in a laneway behind Portland Street and become friends after Yan's pimp is assaulted in front of Fan by an assailant wielding a durian fruit.

Yan services dozens of clients per day and showers compulsively. After her 3-month-stay in Hong Kong, Yan returns to her family and her ex-fiancé in Northeast China to invest what she has earned. Yan remains in contact with Fan, receiving a durian from her as a gift.

== Cast ==
- Qin Hailu as Qin Yan
- Mak Wai Fan as Fan
- Mak Suet Man as Man
- Yeung Mei Kam as Fan's mother
- Chang Kin Yung as Policeman

== Production ==
Fan was featured in Little Cheung, a film which also deals with poverty and life as an immigrant. This film also centres upon Portland Street in Kowloon.

Chan became interested in the topic of prostitution while filming Little Cheung in Kowloon, where he met and interviewed various prostitutes. While filming in mainland China, Chan found the public toilets to be terrible and very different. This served as inspiration for his next film Public Toilet (2002).

== Reception ==
In addition to numerous awards, the film has received critical acclaim. Reviews have praised Chan and actresses Qin Hailu and Mak Wai-Fan, and emphasise themes of contrast, urban squalor, youthful optimism, and alienation. The film has been called "deliberate and brooding".

== Awards ==
At the 20th Hong Kong Film Awards in 2001, Durian Durian was nominated for the Best Film, Best Director (Fruit Chan), Best Screenplay (Fruit Chan), Best Actress (Qin Hailu), Best New Performer (Qin Hailu) and Best Art Direction (Tin Muk) awards. It won the awards for Best Screenplay and Best New Performer. It was awarded Best Film at the 2001 Hong Kong Film Critics Society Awards. The film also won the Best Picture award at the 38th Golden Horse Awards, with Qin winning the Best Actress and Best New Performer awards.

== See also ==
- Prostitution in Hong Kong

Awards and achievements
Preceded by Crouching Tiger, Hidden Dragon	Golden Horse Awards for Best Film; 2001	Succeeded by The Best of Times
