= Qin Hailu =

Chinese actress, screenwriter and singer (born 1978)

- 秦海璐
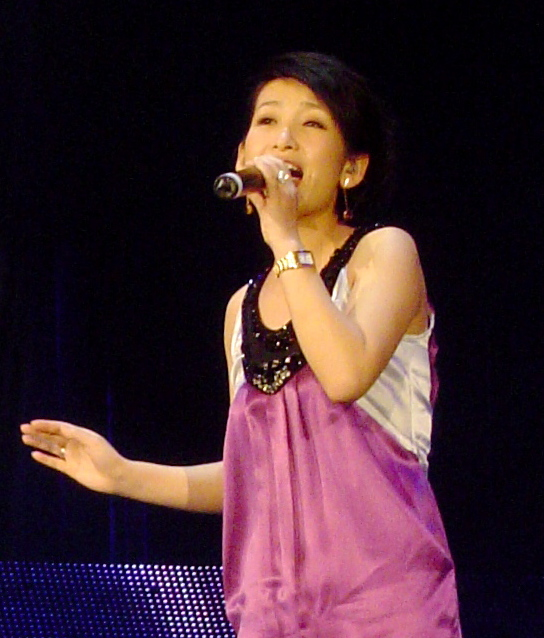
- Qin singing in Shanghai Television Festival, 2006
- Born: 11 August 1978 (age 48); Yingkou, Liaoning, China
- Education: Central Academy of Drama
- Occupations: Actress; Singer; Screenwriter
- Years active: 1999–present
- Musical career
- Also known as: Amanda Qin
- Label: Bravo Stars

Qin Hailu (Chinese: 秦海璐; pinyin: Qín Hǎilù, born 11 August 1978) is a Chinese actress, screenwriter and singer. She has won Best Actress at the Golden Horse Film Festival and Awards, Hong Kong Film Critics Society Award and Golden Bauhinia Awards.

== Early life and education ==
Born with a movie projectionist father and an amateur actress mother, Qin learned to dance at the local Children's Palace when she was still a young child. At the age of 6, she was sent to a Peking Opera school in Yingkou, spending the next ten years training in a strict and harsh environment. She joined a local Peking opera theatre after completing her training. After working for a few years, Qin decided to audition for the Central Academy of Traditional Opera. Though she was late for the auditions, Chang Li, the teacher in charge of recruiting, who later became her instructor, saw for herself Qin's talents and offered her another chance. Yet, only after she had finished all of the tests, did Qin learn that she was at the Central Academy of Drama instead of at the National Academy of Chinese Theatre Arts, and enrolled into the school. In 1999, not long before graduation, Qin was cast by Fruit Chan in her first film.

== Career ==
Qin is best known for her role in the film Durian Durian (2000) by Fruit Chan, which portrays the experiences of a young girl and her sex worker neighbor in Hong Kong. The film won the Best Picture award at the 38th Taiwan's Golden Horse Awards, and Qin won the Best Actress and Best New Performer awards.

Thereafter, Qin starred in Yip Wai Man's film Everlasting Love (2002) with Hong Kong actor Daniel Chan. In the film, Qin plays a country girl who meets and falls in love with a young doctor (played by Chan) who is working for the United Nations. Despite much effort, the film failed to gain much attention and was not well received in theaters. Also in 2002, Qin starred in the film Chicken Poets by Chinese musical director Meng Jinghuai. In the film, Qin plays a colorblind country girl, who dreams of leaving her village in search of a new life.

Qin starred in arthouse comedy The Piano in a Factory (2011) by Zhang Meng, offering to work without pay and supporting the film in post-production work. The film won plaudits from critics and film makers, and numerous awards, including the Best Actress award at the China Movie Channel Media Awards for Qin. Qin also co-wrote and starred in the Taiwanese drama film Return Ticket (2011), based on a true story of a group of village women who rented a bus to go home for the holidays; which earned her the Best Original Screenplay award at the Golden Horse Awards.

Aside from films and dramas, Qin has also participated in numerous stage plays; including Red Rose and White Rose (2010), Four Generations Under One Roof (2012), and Green Snake (2013). In 2012, she won the Outstanding Actress at the China Golden Lion Award for Drama, the highest honor awarded for theater play, for her performance in Four Generations Under One Roof.

Qin starred alongside Zhou Xun in Red Sorghum (2014), based on Nobel laureate Mo Yan's 1986 novel of the same name. She was awarded the Best Supporting Actress at the Shanghai Television Festival for her performance. According to the jury, Qin was able to "handle well her role and figure with a characteristic artistic image."

In 2017, Qin launched her upcoming directorial debut Go It Alone at the Asian New Talent Award.

== Filmography ==
=== Film ===
Year	English title	Chinese title	Role	Notes/Ref.
2000	Durian Durian	榴莲飘飘	Qin Yan (Ah Yan)	
2002	Everlasting Love	停不了的爱	Lu	
2002	Chicken Poets	像鸡毛一样飞	Fang Fang	
2003	The Coldest Day	冬至	Little cabbage	
2004	Love Battlefield	枪林恋曲	Aunty Hua	
2004	Hidden Heroes	追击8月15	Zhang Qi	
2005	Suffocation	窒息	Mei Zi	
2006	Taklimakan	塔克拉玛干	Ya Dan	
2006	Aspirin	阿司匹林	Herself	Cameo
2006	Undercover Tiger	卧虎	Su Fei	
2006	After This Our Exile	父子	Sister Xia	Cameo
2007	Fury Or Love	怒放	Yang Lin	
2007	Call for Love	爱情呼叫转移	Gao Fei	
2007	My Career as a Teacher	我的教师生涯	Zhou Min	
2008	I Am Liu Yuejin	我叫刘跃进	Ma Manli	
2009	Qiu Xi	秋喜	Hui Honglian	
2010	Love Tactics	爱情三十六计	Lu Wanhua	
2011	The Piano in a Factory	钢的琴	Shu Xian	
2011	Return Ticket	到阜阳六百里	Cao Li	
2012	Truth or Dare	真心话大冒险	Tao Ying	Cameo
2012	A Simple Life	桃姐	Ms. Cai	
2013	101st Marriage Proposal	101次求婚	Tao Zi	
2013	Christmas Rose	圣诞玫瑰	Ming Jun	
2013	Young Style	青春派	Teacher San	
2014	The House That Never Dies	京城81号	Psychologist	
2014	The Crossing	太平轮	Xia Shan	
2015	Red Amnesia	闯入者	Wang Lu	
2015	Tale of Three Cities	三城记	Jiu Xiaoling	
2015	The Crossing 2	太平轮		
2016	22nd Catch	购物女王	Chen Meizhi	
2016	Hide & Seek	捉迷藏	Su Hong	
2018	The Pluto Moment	冥王星时刻		
2018	A Fangirl's Romance	迷妹罗曼史	Lulu	Cameo
2018	Impermanence	云水	Su Mei	also producer
2020	The Best Is Yet to Come	不止不休	Mrs. Huang	
2021	Cliff Walkers	悬崖之上	Wang Yu	
2026	It's OK	我，许可	Hu Chunrong	

=== Television series ===
Year	English title	Chinese title	Role	Ref.
2002	Unusual Citizen	非常公民	Wen Xiu	
2003	Yes, I Love You	谁都会说我爱你	Jia Jiaqin	
2004	Legend of Le Ji	骊姬传奇	Le Ji	
2005		桐籽花开	Ba Yuxiang	
2005		偷心之问	Zou Yue	
2006	How Deep is Your Love	爱有多深	Yan Hao	
2006	If the Moon has Eyes	如果月亮有眼睛	Luo Manli	
2007	Thank You for Having Loved Me	谢谢你曾经爱过我	Yin Zhihan	
2007	Women's Choice	女人的选择	Xu Chunni	
2007	Chengdu，leave me alone tonight	成都，今夜请将我遗忘	Zhao Yue	
2007		谁怜天下慈母心	Yuan Haijun	
2008	Women's Flowers	女人花	Lin Xuelian	
2008	Want To Go Home	好想回家	An Xiaoqiu	
2008	Dongfang Shuo	东方朔	Luo Qi	
2009	Shanghai of Bourne	谍影重重之上海	Lin Xuan	
2009	Pigeon Whistle	鸽子哨	Mi Xiaoju	
2010		松花江上	Cheng Xizhen	
2010	Police Meets Soldier	警察遇到兵	Luo's wife	
2010	Golden Wedding	金婚风雨情	Shi Feifei	
2011		盘龙卧虎高山顶	Deng Cao	
2011	Secret History of Empress Wu	武则天秘史	Lady of Han	
2011		金陵秘事	Bai Yanyan	
2012		谍海鹰眼	Li Molan	
2011		再过把瘾	Du Mei	
2012		独立纵队	Li Shuwei	
2012		知足常乐	Sun Fei	
2012	The Fireball	火流星	Liu Xiangmei	
2012	Winter Snow	冬雪	Yang Dongxue	
2012	A World Without Thieves	天下无贼	Xiao Shanghai	
2013	A Family Affair	全家福	Liu Cuilan	
2013	Angel Is Coming	今夜天使降临	Kai Selin	
2013	If By Life You Were Deceived	假如生活欺骗了你	Cheng Zhenzhen	
2013	Glorious Mission	光荣使命	Lin Hai	
2013	Heading For Happiness	向幸福前进	Gao Lihua	
2014		盾神出击	Shi Weilan	
2014	Waits For Happiness	幸福稍后再播	Ye Ling	
2014	Red Sorghum	红高粱	Shu Xian	
2015	Mum Go Go Go	妈妈向前冲	Wang Qing	
2016	Mum Go Go Go 2	妈妈向前冲冲冲	Wang Qing	
2016	Women Must be Stronger	女不强大天不容	Xu Wenjun	
2017	White Deer Plain	白鹿原	Xian Cao	
2018	Only Side by Side with You	南方有乔木	An Ning	
2018		楼外楼	Li Chunxian	
2018	The Years You Were Late	你迟到的许多年	Zhao Yiqin	
2019	The Legendary Tavern	老酒馆	Gu Sanmei	
2020	Dearest, Where Are You	亲爱的，你在哪里	He Xuelin	
2020	The Stage	我待生活如初恋	Shou Qiang	
2020	Love and Lost	最初的相遇，最后的别离		
2021	A Little Mood for Love	小敏家	Li Ping	
2022	Under the Skin	猎罪图鉴	Police Chief	
TBA	Shanghai Picked Flowers	十里洋场拾年花	Ruan Yu	
TBA	Thunder Chaser	雷霆令	Bai Hua	

== Discography ==
=== Albums ===
Year	English title	Chinese title	Language	Ref.
2005	Sweet Aftertaste	幸福回味	Mandarin	
2007	One Way	单行线	Mandarin	

== Awards and nominations ==
Year	Award	Category	Nominated work	Result	Ref.
2000	20th Hong Kong Film Award	Best Actress	Durian Durian	Nominated	
2000	20th Hong Kong Film Award	Best New Performer	Durian Durian	Won	
2000	45th Asia-Pacific Film Festival	Best Actress	Durian Durian	Nominated	
2001	38th Golden Horse Film Festival and Awards	Best Actress	Durian Durian	Won	
2001	38th Golden Horse Film Festival and Awards	Best New Performer	Durian Durian	Won	
2001	7th Hong Kong Film Critics Society Award	Best Actress	Durian Durian	Won	
2001	6th Golden Bauhinia Awards	Best Actress	Durian Durian	Won	
2001	46th Asia-Pacific Film Festival	Best Actress	Chicken Poets	Nominated	
2002	55th Locarno Festival	Best Actress	Chicken Poets	Nominated	
2005	5th Chinese Film Media Awards	Best Supporting Actress	Love Battlefield	Won	
2006	13th Hong Kong Film Critics Society Award	Best Actress	After This Our Exile	Nominated	
2011	2nd New York Chinese Film Festival	Most Popular Asian Artist Award	The Piano in a Factory	Won	
2011	14th Huabiao Awards	Outstanding Actress	The Piano in a Factory	Nominated	
2011	28th Golden Rooster Awards	Best Actress	The Piano in a Factory	Nominated	
2011	48th Golden Horse Awards	Best Leading Actress	The Piano in a Factory	Nominated	
2011	48th Golden Horse Awards	Best Original Screenplay	Return Ticket	Won	
2011	14th China Movie Channel Media Awards	Best Actress	The Piano in a Factory	Won	
2011	18th Beijing College Student Film Festival	Best Actress	The Piano in a Factory	Nominated	
2011	18th Beijing College Student Film Festival	Best Actress	Return Ticket	Nominated	
2012	12th Chinese Film Media Awards	Best Actress	Return Ticket	Nominated	
2012	12th Chinese Film Media Awards	Best Actress	The Piano in a Factory	Nominated	
2012	3rd China Film Director's Guild Awards	Best Actress	The Piano in a Factory	Nominated	
2012	31st Hong Kong Film Award	Best Supporting Actress	A Simple Life	Nominated	
2012	2nd China Golden Lion Award for Drama	Outstanding Actress	Four Generations Under One Roof	Won	
2013	14th Golden Phoenix Awards	Society Award	Young Style	Won	
2013	16th China Movie Channel Media Awards	Best Actress	Young Style	Nominated	
2014	12th Changchun Film Festival	Best Actress	Young Style	Nominated	
2014	5th China Film Director's Guild Awards	Best Actress	Young Style	Nominated	
2014	14th Chinese Film Media Awards	Best Supporting Actress	Young Style	Nominated	
2014	20th Shanghai Television Festival	Best Actress	If By Life You Were Deceived	Nominated	
2015	20th Shanghai Television Festival	Best Supporting Actress	Red Sorghum	Won	
2016	3rd Asia Rainbow TV Awards	Best Supporting Actress	Red Sorghum	Won	
2016	35th Hong Kong Film Award	Best Supporting Actress	Tale of Three Cities	Nominated	
2017	4th The Actors of China Award Ceremony	Best Actress (Sapphire)	—N/a	Won	
2018	31st Flying Apsaras Award	Outstanding Actress	White Deer Plain	Nominated	
2018	24th Shanghai Television Festival	Best Actress	White Deer Plain	Nominated	
2018	24th Huading Awards	Best Actress (Period Drama)	Lou Wai Lou	Nominated	
2019	26th Huading Awards	Best Actress	The Legendary Tavern	Nominated	
2019	26th Huading Awards	Best Actress (Period drama)	The Legendary Tavern	Nominated	
2019	26th Huading Awards	Top Ten Favorite Actors	The Legendary Tavern	Won	
2019	Golden Bud – The Fourth Network Film And Television Festival	Best Actress	The Legendary Tavern, Homeland	Nominated	
2020	26th Shanghai Television Festival	Best Actress	The Legendary Tavern	Nominated	
2020	32nd Flying Apsaras Awards	Outstanding Actress	The Legendary Tavern	Won	
2021	27th Shanghai Television Festival	Best Supporting Actress	The Stage	Nominated	
2021	15th Asian Film Awards	Best Supporting Actress	Cliff Walkers	Nominated	
