= Zhang Lanxin =

Chinese actress (born 1986)

- 张蓝心
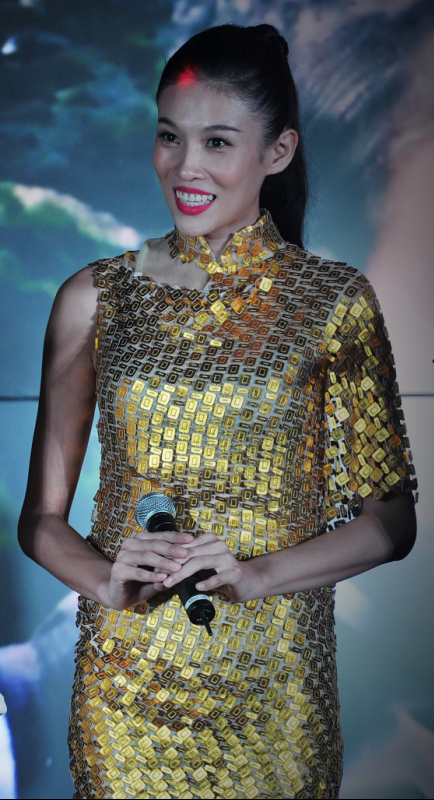
- Zhang Lanxin in 2012.
- Born: 21 July 1986 (age 39); Beijing, China
- Education: Beijing Sport University
- Occupation: Actress
- Years active: 2010–present
- Notable work: Police Story 2013; CZ12; Kung Fu Killer

Chinese name
- Traditional Chinese: 張藍心
- Simplified Chinese: 张蓝心
Transcriptions
Standard Mandarin
- Hanyu Pinyin: Zhāng Lánxīn

Zhang Lanxin (Chinese: 张蓝心; born 21 June 1986) is a Chinese actress. She is noted for her role as Bonnie in the film CZ12.

== Biography ==
Zhang Lanxin was born and raised in Beijing. Lanxin graduated from Beijing Sport University. Lanxin was serving in the China National Taekwondo Team before she entered the entertainment industry. In 2004, she was the champion in the National Taekwondo Championships (55 kilograms).

In 2012, Lanxin made her film debut in CZ12, a Hong Kong-Chinese action film co-produced, written, directed by, and starring Jackie Chan. Lanxin won the Best New Performer at the 9th Huading Awards, and was nominated for the Best New Performer Award at the Beijing College Student Film Festival and the 32nd Hong Kong Film Awards. At the same year, she won the Most Potential Movie Actress Award at the LeTV Awards and the Best New Performer Award at the MSN Fashion Party Awards. Lanxin was cast in Police Story 2013, a Chinese-Hong Kong action crime film directed and written by Ding Sheng, and starring Jackie Chan.

In 2014, Lanxin starred in a romantic comedy film called Who Moved My Dream with Leon Jay Williams and Viona Wang Xi-Yao.

== Filmography ==
=== Film ===
Year	English Title	Chinese Title	Role	Notes
2012	CZ12	十二生肖	Bonnie	
2013	Police Story 2013	警察故事2013		
2014	Who Moved My Dream	谁动了我的梦想		
2015	Money Game	黄金福将		
2015	Who Am I 2015	我是谁2015		
2016	Skiptrace		Ting	
2016	Railroad Tigers	铁道飞虎	Yuko	
2017	Fake Guardians	冒牌监护人之寻宝闹翻天	Lan Fei	
2017	Eternal Wave	密战	Akiyama Masako	
2017	Guns and Kidneys	枪炮腰花	Dong Feifei	
2021	Never Stop	超越	Xie Xiaofang	
TBA	XXX 4	极限特工4		

=== Television ===
Year	English Title	Chinese Title	Role	Notes
2013	Happy Camp	快乐大本营	Herself	
2016	Takes a Real Man	真正男子汉	Herself	

== Awards and nominations ==
Year	Award	Category	Nominated work	Result
2013	9th Huading Award	Best New Performer	CZ12	Won
2013	Hong Kong Film Awards	Best New Performer	CZ12	Nominated
2013	Beijing College Student Film Festival	Best New Performer	CZ12	Nominated
2013	MSN Fashion Party Award	Best New Performer		Won
2013	2013 LeTV Award	Most Potential Movie Actress		Won
