= Zhang Meng (director) =

Chinese director and screenwriter

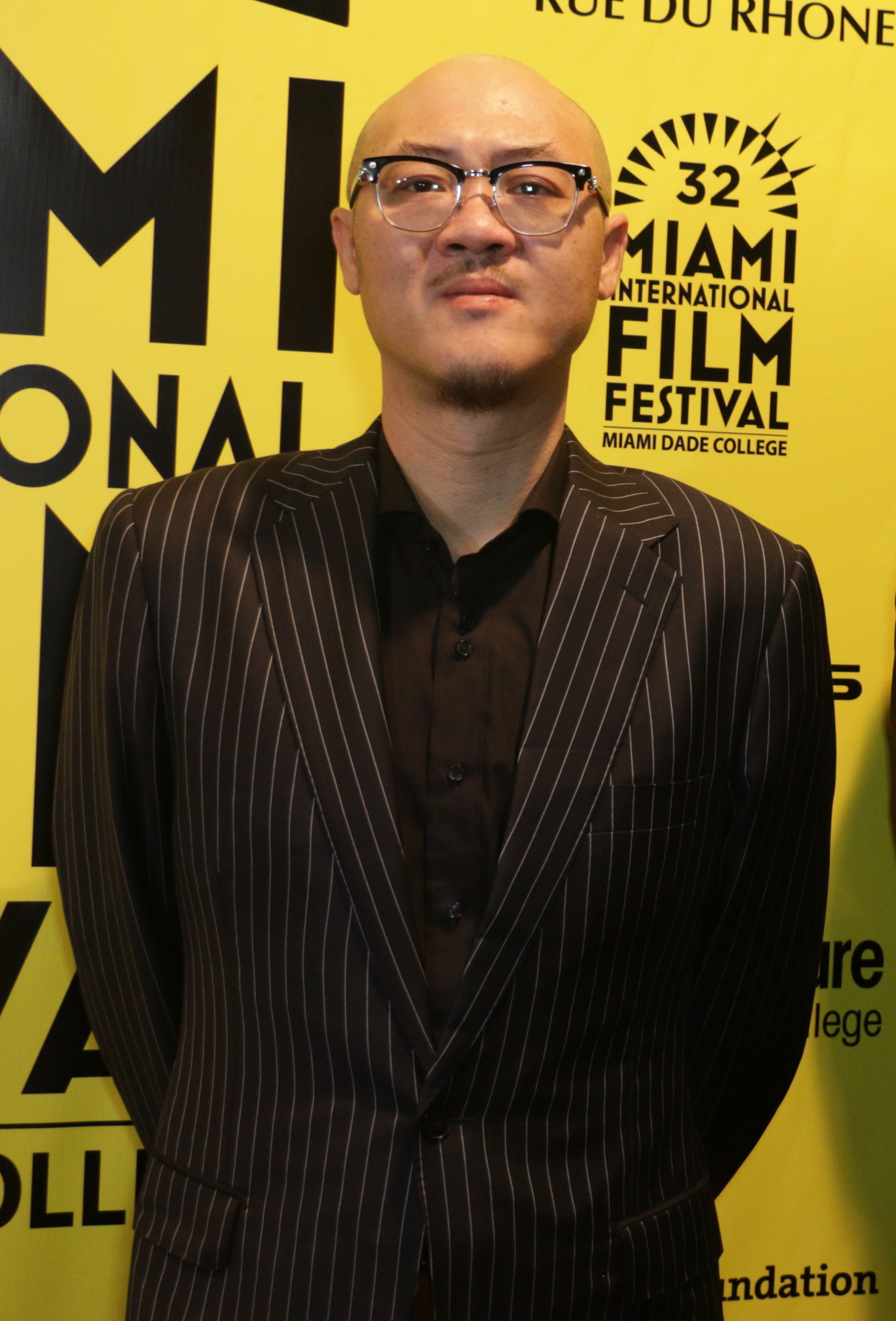
- At the 2015 Miami International Film Festival

Chinese name
- Traditional Chinese: 張猛
- Simplified Chinese: 张猛
Transcriptions

Zhang Meng is a Chinese director and screenwriter.

== Early life and education ==
Zhang Meng is from northeast China.

He graduated from the Chinese Central Academy of Drama.

== Career ==
In 2007, he made his directorial debut with Lucky Dog (Erduo Da You Fu). His first documentary was called Mr. Zhang and His Dog (2008).

The Piano in a Factory (Gang de qin) won the Grand Jury Prize at the Miami International Film Festival in 2011 and the award for best actor, for Wang Qian-Yuan, at the 23rd Tokyo International Film Festival.

== Filmography ==
=== Released films/television series ===
| Year | Film | Director | Writer | Notes |
|---|---|---|---|---|
| 2008 | Mr. Zhang and His Dog | Yes | Yes | documentary |
| 2010 | The Piano in a Factory | Yes | Yes | |
| 2014 | The Piano in a Factory | Yes | Yes | television series |
| 2014 | The Uncle Victory | Yes | | |
| 2016 | Everybody's Fine | Yes | | |
| 2016 | Run for Love | Yes | | |
| 2017 | Guns and Kidneys | Yes | Yes | |
