= Michelle Chen =

Taiwanese actress

Michelle Chen 陳妍希
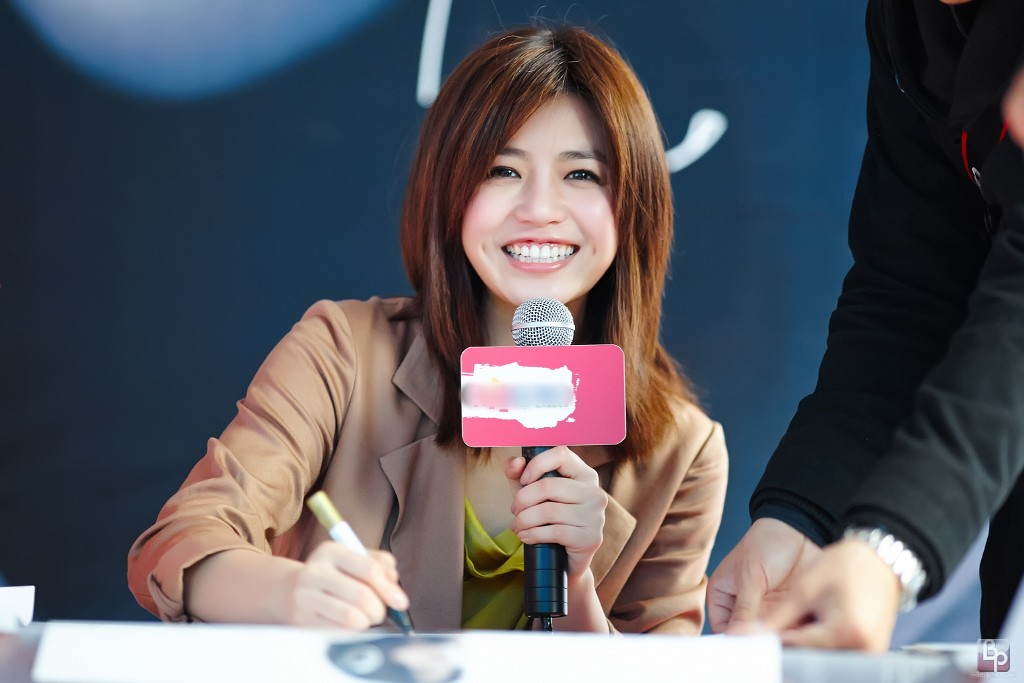
- Chen at an event in Tainan, Taiwan, 2013
- Born: Chen Mei-hsuan (陳玫璇); Taipei, Taiwan
- Education: University of Southern California (BS)
- Occupations: Actress; singer; songwriter
- Years active: 2007–present
- Spouse: Chen Xiao (m. 2016; div. 2025)
- Children: 1

Chinese name
- Traditional Chinese: 陳妍希
- Simplified Chinese: 陈妍希
Transcriptions
Standard Mandarin
- Hanyu Pinyin: Chén Yánxī
Yue: Cantonese
- Jyutping: Can^{4} Jin^{4}-hei^{1}
- Musical career
- Genres: Pop

Michelle Chen Yanxi, born Chen Mei-hsuan, is a Taiwanese actress and singer. Chen rose to fame for her role in the 2011 film You Are the Apple of My Eye, which broke box office records for Taiwanese films in mainland China, Taiwan, Hong Kong and Singapore. Her other notable works include films Hear Me (2009), Badges of Fury (2013), Pali Road (2015), as well as TV series The Romance of the Condor Heroes (2014), Teresa Teng (2024), and Sniper Butterfly (2025).

== Early life and education ==
Chen was born and raised in Taipei. She has an older sister. After middle school, she attended the college-preparatory school Southwestern Academy in San Marino, California. She graduated from the University of Southern California with a Bachelor of Science in business administration in 2005.

In 2006, while visiting family in Taiwan, Chen caught the eye of producer and manager Angie Chai (柴智屏). Chen wanted to break into music at the time, but due to the slow growth of the industry, was persuaded instead by Chai to start her career in acting.

== Career ==
Chen signed a contract with the company Comic Dialogue Theme by Angie Chai. Initially she wanted to be a singer, but the company wanted her to try to advance in the field of cinema. She therefore played supporting roles in several films and television series and caught attention for her lovely and cute looks, but did not leave much impression.

In 2009, she starred in the movie Hear Me as a swimming athlete with hearing disabilities. Her acting captured people's hearts and helped her clinch the nomination for the "Best New Actress Award" at the 46th Golden Horse Film Festival and Awards.

In 2011, after seeing success with her debut film Hear Me, Chen starred in the hit Taiwanese film You Are the Apple of My Eye (2011). The film was written and directed by Giddens Ko, produced by Angie as executive, and based on Ko's novel. In the film, Chen plays the role of Shen Chia-yi. The film broke records at the box office, becoming the 4th highest grossing domestic Taiwanese film. In the film's soundtrack, she also wrote and sang the song Haiziqi (孩子氣). For her performance in the film, Chen was also nominated for a "Best Actress" award at the 46th Golden Horse Film Festival and Awards.

In 2013, due to the success of You Are the Apple of My Eye, Michelle Chen was cast in the lead role of the film Badges of Fury starring Jet Li, Donnie Yen and Simon Yam. In May 2013, Chen released her debut album Me, Myself, and I. Including some self-composed songs, the album received an average response from critics and music listeners.

In 2014, after termination of the contract with the company Comic Voice Tri in 2012, Chen was cast as Xiaolongnü in The Romance of the Condor Heroes. Her casting announcement was met with widespread opposition from the public, with criticisms leveled at her appearance, which is not as light and angelic as the description of Xiaolongnu in the book.

In 2015, Michelle Chen starred in two new series. In the movie Young For You, she played the role of Qiu Zi. In the TV series The Legend of Qin, she portrayed Rong Duanmu.

In 2016, she starred in Pali Road, where she played the role of Lily with actor Jackson Rathbone. The movie, filmed and set in Hawaii, United States.

== Personal life ==
Chen's first boyfriend after entering the entertainment industry was a man by the name of Aron. Both had studied in the U.S. and returned to Taiwan in 2006. After a relationship of 1 year and 4 months, they broke up during Christmas the following year. Aron was later sentenced to 16 years for marijuana trafficking. Chen's single Sorry was written in memory of this relationship.

In 2010, Chen dated Alan Ko for eight months.

In 2015, Chen began dating her The Romance of the Condor Heroes co-star Chen Xiao. On July 5, 2016, they registered their marriage in the city of Beijing and held a wedding ceremony on July 19 at Yanqi Lake (雁栖湖) in Huairou, Beijing. They held the guining banquet (bridal visit to parents) in Chen's hometown of Taipei on July 21, 2016. Chen gave birth to their son in 2016, named Chen Muchen (陈睦辰). On 18 February 2025, the two announced that they were divorced.

== Filmography ==
=== Film ===
Year	English title	Original title	Role	Notes
2009	Hear Me	聽說	Lin Hsiao-peng	
2009	Ego's Mask			
2011	Tempest of First Love	初戀風暴	Chuang Kai-en	
2011	You Are the Apple of My Eye	那些年，我們一起追的女孩	Shen Chia-yi	
2012	The Soul of Bread	愛的麵包魂	Chiu Hsiao-ping	
2012	Ripples of Desire	花漾	Bai Xiaoxue	
2013	Together	在一起	Jojo	
2013	Badges of Fury	不二神探	Angela	
2014	Lock Me Up, Tie Him Down	完美假妻168	Reporter	cameo
2014	Urban Games	城市游戏	Dai Rui	
2014	Café. Waiting. Love	等一個人咖啡	customer	cameo
2015	12 Golden Ducks	12金鴨	Suk-fun	cameo
2015	This Is Me	年少轻狂	Qiu Yingzi	
2015	Go Lala Go 2	杜拉拉II:追婚记	Carrie	cameo
2016	Run for Love	奔爱	Lily	Segment: "Artificial Sunlight" (人造阳光)
2016	Scandal Maker	外公芳龄38	Tang Hui Ru	
2016	Morning, Paris!	巴黎早安	Chantel	
2016	Pali Road	夏威夷之恋	Lily Zhang	
2018	The Shadow Play	风中有朵雨做的云	Lian Ah-yun	
2021	A Trip With Your Wife	跟你老婆去旅行	Xiao Yi	

=== Television series ===
Year	English title	Original title	Role	Notes
2007	Why Why Love	換換愛	Jiang Xiao-nan	
2008	Wish to See You Again	這裡發現愛	Pan Neng-xian	
2008	Miss No Good	不良笑花	Jiang Mi	
2010	Drunken Red Dust	醉紅塵	Lei Jin-yi	
2010	Channel-X	國民英雄	Lo Shan-shan	
2011	Moment in Macau	鏡海風雲	Ni Jing-ya	
2011	Remember, About Us	記得，我們有約	Jiang Mu-yun	
2011	Lin Bei	珍愛林北	Lin Hsiao-ni	
2014	The Romance of the Condor Heroes	神鵰俠侶	Xiaolongnü	
2015	The Legend of Qin	秦時明月	Duanmu Rong	
2016	City Still Believe in Love	北上广依然相信爱情	Huang Yiran	
2021	Got Old Recently	大妈的世界	Sheng Qianshi	
2023	Warm and Sweet	温暖的甜蜜的	Qi Jiayi	
2023	Teresa Teng	但愿人长久	Teresa Teng	
2025	Sniper Butterfly	狙击蝴蝶	Jin Cen	

=== Variety show ===
- 2011–12 Miss Traveler (WOMAN愛旅行) on Chinese Television System — co-host (3 episodes)
- 2015 Yes! Coach (报告！教练) on Dragon Television — reality show contestant

== Discography ==
=== Studio albums ===
Me, Myself, and I

Studio album
- Released: May 2013
- Genre: Pop
- Length: 35:10
- Languages: Mandarin, English
- Label: Linfair Records

All lyrics are written by Michelle Chen

No.	Title	Music	Language	Length
1.	"Shu Gong De Xiao Cheng Gu Shi" (叔公的小城故事; "Great-Uncle's Story of a Small Town")	Michelle Chen & Shih Chia-hao	Mandarin	3:28
2.	"Clueless Boy"	Michelle Chen	English	3:34
3.	"Sorry"	Michelle Chen	English	3:08
4.	"Xuan Ya Shang De Mei Gui" (懸崖上的玫瑰; "The Rose on the Cliff")	Michelle Chen & Stanley Wang	Mandarin	3:37
5.	"Zhijue" (直覺; "Intuition")	Michelle Chen	Mandarin	3:15
6.	"Beautiful"	Michelle Chen	Mandarin & English	3:25
7.	"Fangxiang" (方向; "Direction")	Michelle Chen & Diks Lau	Mandarin	3:48
8.	"I Lost My Sanity"	Michelle Chen	English	3:12
9.	"Wei Guang" (微光; "Faint Light")	Michelle Chen & Lee Shan-hao	Mandarin	3:14
10.	"Dear Friend"	Michelle Chen	Mandarin & English	3:06

=== Other songs ===
All songs are in Mandarin.

Song	Lyrics	Music	Notes
"Gong Xin Ji" (攻心計; "Mind Game") — Lollipop F ft. Michelle Chen	Owodog, 小色, Michelle Chen	Lee Tzu-nung	included in Lollipop F's album Four Dimensions
"Hai Zi Qi" (孩子氣; "Childish")	Michelle Chen		insert song of You Are the Apple of My Eye
"Piao Liu Ping" (漂流瓶; "Drift Bottle") — Ko Chen-tung ft. Michelle Chen	Lee Hsuan-Le		included in Ko Chen-tung's album Be Yourself
"Ai De Mian Bao" (愛的麵包; "The Bread of Love" — ft. Anthony Neely & Chen Han-tien)	Michelle Chen	Skot Suyama	theme song of The Soul of Bread
"Ni Shou Zhong De Jiang Hu" (你手中的江湖; "The Martial World in Your Hands")	Fran		theme song of the mobile game San Jian Hao
"Ni Wo" (你我; "You and Me" — duet with Chen Xiao)	Yu Zheng	Tan Xuan	theme song of The Romance of the Condor Heroes
"Ai Ru Chu Jian" (愛如初見; "Love Like First Sight" — duet with Chen Xiao)	Chen Xi	Dong Dongdong	theme song of the mobile game Shen Diao Xia Lü
"Hua La La" (嘩啦啦)	Michelle Chen	He Liang	theme song of This Is Me

== Awards and nominations ==
Year	Award	Category	Nominated work	Notes
2009	46th Golden Horse Awards	Best New Performer	Hear Me	Nominated
2011	48th Golden Horse Awards	Best Leading Actress	You Are the Apple of My Eye	Nominated
2012	New York Asian Film Festival	Asia Rising Star	—N/a	Won
2012	6th Asian Film Awards	Best Actress	You Are the Apple of My Eye	Nominated
2012	6th Asian Film Awards	Favorite Actress	You Are the Apple of My Eye	Nominated
2012	Changchun Film Festival	Best Actress	You Are the Apple of My Eye	Nominated
2012	Chinese Film Media Awards	Favorite Performance	You Are the Apple of My Eye	Won
2012	Chinese Film Media Awards	Favorite Actress	You Are the Apple of My Eye	Nominated
2012	LeTV Awards	Most Influential Movie Actress	You Are the Apple of My Eye	Won
2012	Chinese Music Awards	Best Movie Actress	You Are the Apple of My Eye	Won
2015	17th Huading Awards	Best Actress (ancient drama)	The Romance of the Condor Heroes	Won
2016	19th Huading Awards	Best Actress (ancient drama)	The Legend of Qin	Nominated
2019	2nd Cultural and Entertainment Industry Congress	Best Supporting Actress (Film)	The Shadow Play	Nominated
