= Hear Me (film) =

- Theatrical release poster
- Directed by: Cheng Fen-fen
- Written by: Cheng Fen-fen
- Produced by: Peggy Chiao; Cheng Fen-fen
- Starring: Eddie Peng; Ivy Chen; Michelle Chen
- Cinematography: Chin Ting-chang
- Edited by: Chen Chih-hsuan
- Music by: BABY-C; Kay Huang
- Production companies: Trigram Films; Great Vision Film & TV
- Release date: August 28, 2009
- Running time: 109 minutes
- Country: Taiwan
- Languages: Mandarin; Taiwan Sign Language

Hear Me (Chinese: 聽說) is a 2009 Taiwanese romantic comedy film written and directed by Taiwanese director Cheng Fen-fen. It stars Eddie Peng, Ivy Chen and Michelle Chen. The film is notable for its use of sign language for the better part of the film.

The movie was filmed in Taipei, Taiwan, and premiered on August 28, 2009, dedicated to the Deaflympics held in Taipei at the same year.

== Plot ==
Tian-Kuo (Eddie Peng) is a genial boy in his early twenties living with his parents, running deliveries for their small family-run restaurant, biking box lunches all over the city. He often stops at the local swimming pool, dropping off orders for the team of deaf athletes who train there. One day he notices Yang Yang (Ivy Chen), a young deaf girl who follows the team to cheer on her older sister Xiao Peng (Michelle Chen), who hopes to make the cut for the forthcoming Deaflympics. Tian-Kuo is instantly smitten with Yang Yang. With the use of sign language, he tries to strike up a friendship with her, hoping it will lead to something more.

As time passes, Tian-Kuo and Yang Yang's friendship develops. Yang Yang reveals her father works as a Christian missionary in Africa, leaving her and her sister on their own in Taiwan. In order to provide for their household and to allow her sister to focus on swimming, Yang Yang works a variety of jobs, including a part-time job as a street performer. One night, Tian-Kuo invites Yang Yang out to dinner, which the latter insists will be her treat. However, when the time comes for the bill to be paid, Tian-Kuo pays instead so as to not hold up the line of waiting customers. Upset, Yang Yang tells Tian-Kuo off for looking down on her and leaves.

That same night, Xiao Peng, who has fallen asleep at home by herself, cannot hear the emergency services come when a fire breaks out in the apartment upstairs. After being found unconscious, she is taken to the hospital, where Yang Yang visits her and discovers that, unbeknownst to Xiao Peng herself, she has sustained damage to her throat and ribs such that she may be unable to participate in the Deaflympics. As Tian-Kuo fruitlessly attempts to reconcile with Yang Yang, Xiao Peng struggles to keep up with her teammates and regain her strength. After being informed that she may be ineligible to participate in the Deaflympics, a distraught Xiao Peng lashes out at Yang Yang for putting her swimming dreams before her own. Later that night, Yang Yang reaches out to Tian-Kuo through MSN and asks if a deaf person can be with a hearing person.

Yang Yang visits Tian-Kuo's family restaurant while he is running deliveries to pay him back in full for the lunchboxes he has been bringing her. Tian-Kuo's parents express approval of Yang Yang and acceptance of her deafness, claiming they are even willing to learn sign language, which encourages Tian-Kuo to pursue Yang Yang until he finds her at the swimming pool. While her back is turned to him, he practices his confession out loud, leading Yang Yang to discover that contrary to her assumption that he was deaf, he is hearing. Under the pretense of giving her a job at his family restaurant, Tian-Kuo invites Yang Yang to meet his parents. Upon meeting them, she reveals that she, too, is hearing, and that the two of them had misunderstood the other to be deaf the whole time. They confess their feelings for each other and begin their relationship. Xiao Peng drops out of the swimming competition, deciding to look for a job and practice on the side until she has regained her strength before competing again. While Yang Yang is hesitant, Tian-Kuo encourages her to be supportive of her sister's decision to live more independently.

Four years later, Tian-Kuo and Yang Yang are shown supporting Xiao Peng in the stands as she competes in the 2013 Deaflympics over closing text stating: "Love and dreams are strange phenomena. They need not be heard, spoken, or translated to be understood."

== Cast ==
- Eddie Peng as Tian-Kuo Huang
- Ivy Chen as Yang Yang
- Michelle Chen as Xiao Peng
- Lo Bei-an as Tian-Kuo's father
- Lin Mei-hsiu as Tian-Kuo's mother

== Production ==
=== Development ===
In 2007, director Cheng wrote the script inspired from a book she read that was said to be written by a hearing person who fell in love with a hearing impaired person.

== Remake ==
A South Korean remake titled Hear Me: Our Summer, was released in South Korea on November 6, 2024.
