= Return Ticket =

2011 film

- Film poster
- Directed by: Teng Yung-shin
- Written by: Yang Nanchian; Teng Yungshin; Qin Hailu; Ge Wenzhe; Xi Ran
- Produced by: Lanping Shan; Hou Hsiao-hsien
- Starring: Li Binbin; Qin Hailu
- Cinematography: Shao-Yu Hsia
- Release date: March 22, 2011 (Hong Kong IFF)
- Running time: 85 minutes
- Country: China
- Language: Mandarin

Return Ticket (Chinese: 到阜陽六百里) is a 2011 Chinese drama film directed by Teng Yung-shin and co-produced by Hou Hsiao-hsien.

== Cast ==
- Li Bin Bin as Guozi
- Qin Hailu as Cai Li
- Yiquan Shen 沈弈铨 as Jiuzi
- Qun Tang 唐群
