= The Piano in a Factory =

2010 film directed by Zhang Meng

- Chinese advertising poster
- Directed by: Zhang Meng
- Written by: Zhang Meng
- Produced by: Kwak Jae-Young; Choi Gwang-suk; Jessica Kam; Henry Fong Ping
- Starring: Qin Hailu; Wang Qianyuan
- Cinematography: Shu Chou (as Jeremy Zhou)
- Edited by: Gao Bo
- Music by: Oh Young-Mook; 17 Hippies
- Production company: Perfect World Pictures
- Release dates: October 23, 2010 (Tokyo International Film Festival); July 15, 2011 (China)
- Running time: 107 minutes
- Country: China
- Language: Mandarin

The Piano in a Factory (Chinese: 钢的琴) is 2010 Chinese drama film. The film is directed by Zhang Meng, and stars Qin Hailu and Wang Qianyuan. It tells the story of a father, Chen Guilin, who works very hard to realize his daughter's dream of owning a piano.

== Plot ==
Set in the 1990s, laid-off worker Chen Guilin was betrayed by his wife, who remarried a rich business man who has much more money than him. The condition for the custody of their daughter is to give their daughter a piano. Chen tries all means to borrow money from his friends, even attempting to steal a piano, but all his attempts fail. Despite these challenges, Chen always maintains an optimistic outlook. Finally, he decides to build a piano with his friends.

The group eventually build a piano which is made of steel. He also organizes a band to make a living and uses his wisdom to create a life which is full of sound and color.

== Cast ==
- Wang Qianyuan as Chen Guilin
- Qin Hailu as Chen's wife

== Music ==
The music is mainly composed and played by Berlin based band 17 Hippies.

== Reception ==
=== Accolades ===
| Year | Award | Category | Result | Recipient |
|---|---|---|---|---|
| 2010 | 23rd Tokyo International Film Festival | Award for Best Actor | Won | Wang Qianyuan |
| 2010 | 7th Hong Kong Asian Film Festival | Best director award | Nominated | Zhang Meng |
| 2011 | 3rd Sydney Chinese Film Festival | Special Recommendation of Jury | Won | The Piano in a Factory |
| 2011 | 28th Miami International Film Festival | Best International Movie | Nominated | The Piano in a Factory |
| 2011 | 18th Beijing College Student Film Festival | Artistic Exploration Award | Won | The Piano in a Factory |
| 2011 | 18th Beijing College Student Film Festival | Best Actress | Nominated | Qin Hailu |
| 2011 | 18th Beijing College Student Film Festival | Best Actor | Nominated | Wang Qianyuan |
| 2011 | 14th Shanghai International Film Festival | Best Director | Nominated | Zhang Meng |
| 2011 | 14th Shanghai International Film Festival | Best Actor | Nominated | Wang Qianyuan |
| 2011 | 14th Shanghai International Film Festival | Best Actress | Nominated | Qin Hailu |
| 2011 | 14th Huabiao Film Award | Best Actress | Nominated | Qin Hailu |
| 2011 | 14th Huabiao Film Award | Outstanding Writer | Nominated | Zhang Meng |
| 2011 | 28th Golden Rooster Award | Best Feature Film | Nominated | The Piano in a Factory |
| 2011 | 28th Golden Rooster Award | Best Director | Nominated | Zhang Meng |
| 2011 | 28th Golden Rooster Award | Best Play-writer | Nominated | Zhang Meng |
| 2011 | 28th Golden Rooster Award | Best Actor | Nominated | Wang Qianyuan |
| 2011 | 28th Golden Rooster Award | Best Actress | Nominated | Qin Hailu |
| 2011 | 28th Golden Horse Award | Best Dramatic Series Movie | Nominated | The Piano in a Factory |
| 2011 | 28th Golden Horse Award | Best Director | Nominated | Zhang Meng |
| 2011 | 28th Golden Horse Award | Best Original Script | Nominated | Zhang Meng |
| 2011 | 28th Golden Horse Award | Best Actor | Nominated | Wang Qianyuan |
| 2011 | 28th Golden Horse Award | Best Actress | Nominated | Qin Hailu |
| 2011 | 28th Golden Horse Award | Best Photography | Nominated | Zhou Shu-Hao |
| 2011 | 28th Golden Horse Award | Best Original Film Music | Nominated | Wu Yong-Mo |
| 2011 | 28th Golden Flower Movie Festival | Special Award of Jury | Won | The Piano in a Factory |
