= Everybody's Fine (2016 film) =

- Poster
- Chinese: 一切都好
- Directed by: Zhang Meng
- Written by: Song Xiao
- Produced by: Ma Ke; Michael Ren; Chen Guoxing; La Peikang; Zhang Han; Zhao Haicheng
- Starring: Zhang Guoli; Yao Chen; Shawn Dou; Ye Yiyun; Chen He
- Music by: Roc Chen
- Distributed by: Beijing Jinsheng Xinma Entertainment
- Release date: January 1, 2016
- Running time: 105 minutes
- Country: China
- Language: Mandarin
- Box office: US$3.71 million

Everybody's Fine (Chinese: 一切都好) is a 2016 Chinese family comedy film directed by Zhang Meng. It was released in China on January 1, 2016. It is the second remake of 1990 Italian film of the same name.

== Plot ==
Zhiguo Guan, a retired geologist, has been communicating with his four children through his wife for years. Although he loves them, he has a difficult time expressing it, as he sits in his home. After his wife died, Guan suddenly realized the distance between himself and his children. He expects to finally see his children at a family reunion, however, none of them are able to attend. He then travels to different part of the country alone to visit his "smug" and "grown" children. There are many funny, tearful stories happened during this experience.

Zhiguo Guan first visits his little son, Hao Guan, who is a photographer in Tianjin. He arrives at his son's studio and finds there is no one in the studio. He waits downstair for a day, but still, nobody appears. It later turns out that Hao Guan travels to Tibet and encounters snow slides. He is in the hospital getting treatments.

Zhiguo Guan then travels to Hangzhou to visit his big daughter, Qin Guan. She divorces with her husbands and Zhiguo Guan finds out this fact only until this visit.

Next, Zhiguo Guan travels to Shanghai to visit his big son, Quan Guan. Quan Guan resigns from his original job and decides to start up a business with his friends. He lives with his friends in small apartments. He has not told Zhiguo Guan, his father about any of these facts.

Zhiguo Guan travels to Macau to visit his youngest daughter, Chu Guan. Zhiguo Guan thinks his youngest daughter is a ballet dancer, but it turns out that Chu Guan works as a dummy ballet doll at a restaurant.

All of Zhiguo Guan's children were hiding their true lives from their father, just like the title of the movie, Everybody's Fine. But at the end of the movie, all the children comes home at Chinese New Year and the family finally reunites.

== Cast ==
- Zhang Guoli as Zhiguo Guan
- Yao Chen as Qin Guan
- Shawn Dou as Quan Guan
- Ye Yiyun as Chu Guan
- Chen He as Hao Guan
- Zhang Yi as Husband of Qin Guan
- Zhang Xinyi as Chu Guan's girlfriend

=== Guest Role ===
- Zhou Dongyu as Taxi passenger
- Zhang Yibai as Scammer Playing Erhu
- Guo Yong Zhen as Guan Quan's neighbour

== Production ==
Ma Ke, a producer of the film, worked with William Kong to gain an adaption copyright license to make the Chinese version of the Italian film.

=== Inspiration ===
Ma Ke stated that after watching the original Italian film, he aimed to create a Chinese version. He believed that the plotline of the film would be successful in China.

== Soundtrack ==
No.	Title	Artist	Length
1.	"一切都好"	Lei Zhang	04:48

== Critical reception ==
Douban, a major Chinese media rating site, rate the movie 6.5/10.

A review article of the movie from Asian Film Strike called it "a visually pleasing fable".

== Box office ==
The film grossed US$2.76 million on the opening weekend, and a total of US$3.80 million.
