= List of Hong Kong films of 2006 =

This article lists feature-length Hong Kong films released in 2006.

== Box office ==
The highest-grossing Hong Kong films released in 2006 by domestic box office gross revenue, are as follows:

Highest-grossing films released in 2006
Rank	Title	Domestic gross
1	Fearless	HK$30,201,600
2	Rob-B-Hood	HK$23.447.278
3	Confession of Pain	HK$20,062,814
4	Curse of the Golden Flower	HK$19,913,259
5	A Battle of Wits	HK$15,597,900
6	Re-cycle	HK$14,188,772
7	Election 2	HK$13,577,947
8	Dragon Tiger Gate	HK$12,108,975
9	McDull, the Alumni	HK$10,653,570
10	2 Become 1	HK$10,236,683

== Releases ==
Title	Director	Cast	Genre	Notes
18 Fingers of Death!	James Lew			
2 Become 1	Law Wing-Cheong	Miriam Yeung, Richie Ren	Romantic comedy-drama	
49 Days	Lam Kin Lung, Tsui Siu-Ming			
A Battle of Wits	Jacob Cheung	Andy Lau, Ahn Sung-ki		
After This Our Exile	Patrick Tam	Aaron Kwok		
Ba Wang	Wei Han Tao			
Bet To Basic	Paul Chung	Jordan Chan, Rain Li, Yuen Wah, Eric Kot, Chin Ka-lok		
Black Night	Patrick Leung			
Cocktail	Ching Long, Herman Yau			
Confession of Pain	Andrew Lau, Alan Mak	Tony Leung Chiu-Wai, Takeshi Kaneshiro, Shu Qi	Drama	
Crazy Stone	Ning Hao			
Curse of the Golden Flower	Zhang Yimou	Chow Yun-fat, Gong Li, Jay Chou		
Daisy	Andrew Lau			
Dating a Vampire	Clarence Fok Yiu-leung			
Diary	Oxide Pang			
Dog Bite Dog	Cheang Pou-Soi			
Don't Open Your Eyes	Clarence Fok Yiu-leung	Alex Fong, Yuen Wah		
Dragon Tiger Gate	Wilson Yip	Donnie Yen, Nicholas Tse, Shawn Yue, Dong Jie, Yuen Wah, Chen Kuan-tai, Louis Koo		
Election 2	Johnnie To	Louis Koo, Simon Yam, Nick Cheung		Screened at the 2006 Cannes Film Festival
Exiled	Johnnie To	Anthony Wong, Francis Ng, Nick Cheung, Josie Ho, Lam Suet, Roy Cheung, Simon Yam		
Fatal Contact	Dennis Law	Wu Jing, Ronald Cheng		
Fearless	Ronny Yu	Jet Li		
Feel It Say It...	Benny Chan Chi Shun			
Half Twin	Yip Wai Ying			
Heavenly Mission	James Yuen	Ekin Cheng, Stephen Fung, Alex Fong, Julian Cheung, Niki Chow, Eric Kot, Wayne Lai, Ti Lung, Carl Ng		
I'll Call You	Lam Chi Chung	Alex Fong, Viann Leung, Gordon Lam, Danny Chan, Lam Suet, Yuen Qiu, Andy Lau		
Isabella	Pang Ho-Cheung	Chapman To, Isabella Leong, Anthony Wong		
Lethal Ninja	Herman Yau			
Love Undercover 3	Joe Ma			
Love @ First Note	Dennis Law Sau-Yiu			
Men Suddenly In Black 2	Qing Zhong	Eric Tsang, Jordan Chan, Cheung Tat-ming, Wong You Nam, Teresa Mo, Marsha Yuen, Josie Ho, Gia Lin		
Marriage with a Fool	Patrick Kong			
McDull, the Alumni	Samson Chiu			
Midnight Running	Wong Chung Ning			
Mr. 3 Minutes	Gordon Chan			
My Kung-Fu Sweetheart	Wong Jing			
My Mother is a Belly Dancer	Lee Kung-Lok	Kristal Tin, Gordon Lam, Monie Tung, Suet Lee, Tan Yan Mei, Andy Lau, Kent Tong		
My Name is Fame	Lawrence Ah Mon	Lau Ching Wan, Huo Siyan, Ekin Cheng Yee-Kin, Kong Hon	Drama	
Nothing Is Impossible	Lam Wah-Chuen			
On the Edge	Herman Yau	Nick Cheung		
Re-cycle	The Pang Brothers			Screened at the 2006 Cannes Film Festival
Rob-B-Hood	Benny Chan	Jackie Chan	action-comedy	
Shaolin Vs Evil Dead Ultimate Power	Douglas Kung			
Silk	Su Chao-Bin			
Superkid	Cha Chuen Yee			
The 601st Phone Call	Zhang Guoli			
The Banquet	Feng Xiaogang	Zhang Ziyi, Ge You, Daniel Wu, Zhou Xun, Ma Jingwu, Huang Xiaoming		
The Heavenly Kings	Daniel Wu			
The Knot	Yin Li			
The Shopaholics	Wai Ka-Fai			
Undercover Hidden Dragon	Gordon Chan, Dante Lam			
Undying Heart	Gary Mak Wing Lun			
We Are Family	Clifton Ko			
Wife From Hell	Law Wai-Tak			
Wo Hu	Marco Mak, Wang Gwang Li	Eric Tsang, Francis Ng, Jordan Chan, Sonija Kwok, Michael Miu, Julian Cheung, Shawn Yue	Crime	aka. Crouching Tiger Undercover Tiger
