= 26th Hong Kong Film Awards =

2007 Hong Kong Film Awards

- Promotional poster for the 26th Hong Kong Film Awards ceremony
- Date: 15 April 2007
- Site: Hong Kong Cultural Center
- Hosted by: Bowie Tsang; Nick Cheung; Lam Chi-chung

The 26th Hong Kong Film Awards ceremony was held on 15 April 2007 in the Hong Kong Cultural Centre and hosted by Bowie Tsang, Nick Cheung and Lam Chi-chung. Twenty-six winners in nineteen categories were unveiled, with film After This Our Exile being the year's biggest winner. The ceremony also featured performances by Jay Chou, Eason Chan, Alive and Jane Zhang.

The nominees were announced on 1 February 2007. Over a hundred nominees contested for seventeen categories of awards. The front runners were Curse of the Golden Flower and After This Our Exile, with fourteen and ten nominations respectively.

== Awards ==
In the Best Asian Film category, nominee Still Life (China) was withdrawn as it failed to meet the election criteria, which stipulate that nominees for the category must be released by means of 35 mm film. The vacancy was filled by I Not Stupid Too (Singapore).

Winners are listed first, highlighted in boldface, and indicated with a double dagger (‡).

| **Best Film**: **After This Our Exile**‡; Exiled; Election 2; Curse of the Golden Flower; Fearless | **Best Director**: **Patrick Tam — After This Our Exile**‡; Johnnie To — Exiled; Johnnie To — Election 2; Zhang Yimou — Curse of the Golden Flower; Jacob Cheung — A Battle Of Wits |
| **Best Screenplay**: **Patrick Tam and Tian Koi-Leong — After This Our Exile**‡; Sylvia Chang, Mathias Woo and Theresa Tang — Happy Birthday; James Yuen, Jessica Fong and Lo Yiu-Fai — My Name is Fame; Yau Nai-Hoi, Yip Tin-Shing — Election 2; Felix Chong and Alan Mak — Confession Of Pain | **Best Actor**: **Lau Ching-Wan — My Name is Fame**‡; Aaron Kwok — After This Our Exile; Tony Leung Chiu Wai — Confession Of Pain; Chow Yun-fat — Curse of the Golden Flower; Jet Li — Fearless |
| **Best Actress**: **Gong Li — Curse of the Golden Flower**‡; Teresa Mo — Men Suddenly In Black 2; Rene Liu — Happy Birthday; Isabella Leong — Isabella; Angelica Lee — Re-cycle | **Best Supporting Actor**: **Ian Iskandar — After This Our Exile**‡; Simon Yam — Election 2; Nick Cheung — Election 2; Jay Chou — Curse of the Golden Flower; Liu Ye — Curse of the Golden Flower |
| **Best Supporting Actress**: **Zhou Xun — The Banquet**‡; Kelly Lin — After This Our Exile; Isabella Leong — Diary; Candice Yu — My Name Is Fame; Kristal Tin — My Mother Is a Belly Dancer | **Best New Performer**: **Ian Iskandar — After This Our Exile**‡; Huo Siyan — My Name Is Fame; Pei Pei — Dog Bite Dog; Betty Sun — Fearless; Matthew Medvedev — Rob-B-Hood |
| **Best Cinematography**: **Andrew Lau and Lai Yiu-fai — Confession of Pain**‡; Mark Lee — After This Our Exile; Charlie Lam — Isabella; Cheng Siu-Keung — Exiled; Zhao Xiaoding — Curse of the Golden Flower | **Best Film Editing**: **Eric Kong — A Battle of Wits**‡; Patrick Tam — After This Our Exile; David Richardson — Exiled; Azrael Chung — Confession of Pain; Virginia Katz and Richard Learoyd — Fearless |
| **Best Art Direction**: **Huo Tingxiao — Curse of the Golden Flower**‡; Patrick Tam and Cyrus Ho — After This Our Exile; Man Lim-Chung — Isabella; Timmy Yip — The Banquet; Man Lim-Chung — Confession of Pain | **Best Costume Make Up Design**: **Yee Chung-Man — Curse of the Golden Flower**‡; Stephanie Wong — Isabella; Timmy Yip — The Banquet; Man Lim-Chung — Confession of Pain; Tong Huamiao — A Battle of Wits |
| **Best Action Choreography**: **Yuen Wo-ping — Fearless**‡; Tony Ching — Curse of the Golden Flower; Stephen Tung — A Battle of Wits; Donnie Yen — Dragon Tiger Gate; Jackie Chan, Li Chung Chi and Jackie Chan Stunt Team — Rob-B-Hood | **Best Original Film Score**: **Peter Kam — Isabella**‡; Tan Dun — The Banquet; Chan Kwong Wing — Confession of Pain; Shigeru Umebayashi — Curse of the Golden Flower; Kenji Kawai — A Battle of Wits |
| **Best Original Film Song**: **菊花台 — Curse of the Golden Flower**‡; Composer: Jay Chou; Lyricist: Vincent Fang; Singer: Jay Chou; 阿當的抉擇 — The Heavenly Kings; Composer: Davy Chan; Lyricist: Li Jin-Yi; Singer: Alive; 生日快樂 — Happy Birthday; Composer: Chan Fai-Yeung; Lyricist: Albert Leung; Singer: Rene Liu; 我用所有報答愛 — The Banquet; Composer: Tan Dun; Lyricist: Fan Xueyi; Singer: Jane Zhang; 霍元甲 — Fearless; Composer: Jay Chou; Lyricist: Vincent Fang; Singer: Jay Chou | **Best Sound Design**: **Nakom Kositpaisal — Re-cycle**‡; Wang Danrong — The Banquet; Tao Jing and Roger Savage — Curse of the Golden Flower; Steve Burgess and He Wei — A Battle of Wits; Richard Yawn — Fearless |
| **Best Visual Effects**: **Ng Yuen Fai, Chas Chau, Emil Yee** **and Alex Lim — Re-cycle**‡; Jiang Yanming — The Banquet; Angela Barson, Frankie Chung, John Leonti and Sze Cheuk Wah — Curse of the Golden Flower; Clement Cheng, Victor Wong and Eddy Wong — A Battle of Wits; Koan Hui — Dragon Tiger Gate | **Best New Director**: **Daniel Wu — The Heavenly Kings**‡; Law Wing-Cheong — 2 Become 1; Patrick Kong — Marriage With A Fool |
| **Best Asian Film**: **Riding Alone for Thousands of Miles (China)**‡; I Not Stupid Too (Singapore); Death Note(Japan); Crazy Stone(China); The Host (South Korea) | **Century Achievement**: **Run Run Shaw**‡ |
**Professional Achievement**: **Man Yun-Ling**‡

The Century Achievement Award was an award presented at the 26th Hong Kong Film Awards to entertainment mogul Sir Run Run Shaw for his 80 years of contributions to the film industry.

Hong Kong Film Award Century Achievement Award
- Country: Hong Kong
- Presented by: Hong Kong Film Awards
- First award: 2007
