= 43rd Golden Horse Awards =

Award ceremony for Chinese-language films of 2005 and 2006

- Promotional poster
- Date: November 25, 2006
- Site: Taipei Arena, Taipei, Taiwan
- Hosted by: Kevin Tsai and Patty Hou
- Preshow hosts: He Rong and Coco Chiang
- Organized by: Taipei Golden Horse Film Festival Executive Committee

Highlights
- Best Feature Film: After This Our Exile
- Best Director: Peter Chan; Perhaps Love
- Best Actor: Aaron Kwok; After This Our Exile
- Best Actress: Zhou Xun; Perhaps Love
- Most awards: Perhaps Love (4)
- Most nominations: Perhaps Love (12)

Television in Taiwan
- Channel: Azio TV
- Ratings: 1.08% (average)

The 43rd Golden Horse Awards (Mandarin:第43屆金馬獎) took place on November 25, 2006 at the Taipei Arena in Taipei, Taiwan.

== Winners and nominees ==
Winners are listed first and highlighted in boldface.

**Best Feature Film**: **After This Our Exile**; Crazy Stone; Exiled; Silk; Perhaps Love	**Best Short Film**: **The Secret in the Wind**; Next Door; 53 Flower House; Days on the Crosswalk
**Best Documentary**: **My Football Summer**; Doctor	**Best Animation Feature** -
**Best Director**: **Peter Chan — Perhaps Love**; Johnnie To — Exiled; Su Chao-bin — Silk; Ning Hao — Crazy Stone	**Best Leading Actor**: **Aaron Kwok — After This Our Exile**; Sam Lee — Dog Bite Dog; Francis Ng — Wo Hu
**Best Leading Actress**: **Zhou Xun — Perhaps Love**; Siqin Gaowa — The Postmodern Life of My Aunt; Angelica Lee — Re-cycle; Carina Lau — Curiosity Kills the Cat	**Best Supporting Actor**: **Ian Gouw — After This Our Exile**; Chapman To — Moonlight in Tokyo; Matt Wu — The Touch of Fate; Joseph Chang — Eternal Summer
**Best Supporting Actress**: **Nikki Hsieh — Reflections**; Amy Chum — My Mother Is a Belly Dancer; Zhao Wei — The Postmodern Life of My Aunt	**Best New Performer**: **Ray Chang — Eternal Summer**; Matt Wu — The Touch of Fate; Ian Gouw — After This Our Exile; Joseph Chang — Eternal Summer
**Audience Choice Award**: **Exiled**; After This Our Exile; Crazy Stone; Silk; Perhaps Love	**Formosa Film Award**: **Do Over**; Days on the Crosswalk; The Touch of Fate
**Formosa Filmmaker Award**: **Kuo Li-chi**; Pan Ziyuan; Chen Bolin	**Special Award**: **Chen Tzu-fu**
