= One Take Only =

2001 film by Danny Pang Phat, Oxide Pang Chun

Som and Bank: Bangkok for Sale
- Thai theatrical poster.
- Directed by: Oxide Pang
- Written by: Oxide Pang
- Produced by: Kittikorn Liasirikun; The Pang Brothers; Udom Piboonlapudom
- Starring: Pawarith Monkolpisit; Wanatchada Siwapornchai
- Cinematography: Krisorn Buramasing; Decha Srimantra
- Edited by: Oxide Pang
- Music by: Orange Music
- Distributed by: Film Bangkok; Tartan Films
- Release date: February 14, 2001
- Running time: 88 minutes
- Country: Thailand
- Language: Thai

One Take Only (Thai: ส้ม แบงค์ มือใหม่หัดขาย, also Som and Bank: Bangkok for Sale) is a 2001 crime-drama film written and directed by Oxide Pang.

== Plot ==
Bank is a small-time hoodlum in Bangkok. He uses drugs, and sometimes works for some local gangsters, smuggling guns and drugs. One day he meets Som, a teenage girl who works as a prostitute. The pair fall in love, and in a bid to better their lives, they get into a drug deal that is too big for either of them.

== Production and release ==
Originally named Som and Bank: Bangkok for Sale, the film is part of the loose "Bangkok trilogy" by the Pang Brothers, which includes their Bangkok Dangerous and Danny Pang's 1+1=0 (Nothing to Lose).

Som and Bank had been completed in 2001 before production commenced on their ghost film, The Eye. The film had screened in November 2001 at the Bangkok Film Festival, but the studio, Film Bangkok, then shelved the film until February 2003, releasing it after Oxide Pang had re-edited it. The Board of Censors objected to the title of the film, so it was renamed One Take Only.

The film was also screened at the International Film Festival Rotterdam, the Hong Kong International Film Festival, the San Francisco International Film Festival, the Asiatica Film Mediale and the NatFilm Festival in 2002.

The film was released on DVD by Tartan Films on August 22, 2006. Confusingly, it has also been released on DVD in Thailand as Som and Bank: Bangkok for Sale.
