= Pathé Exchange =

Former film production and distribution company

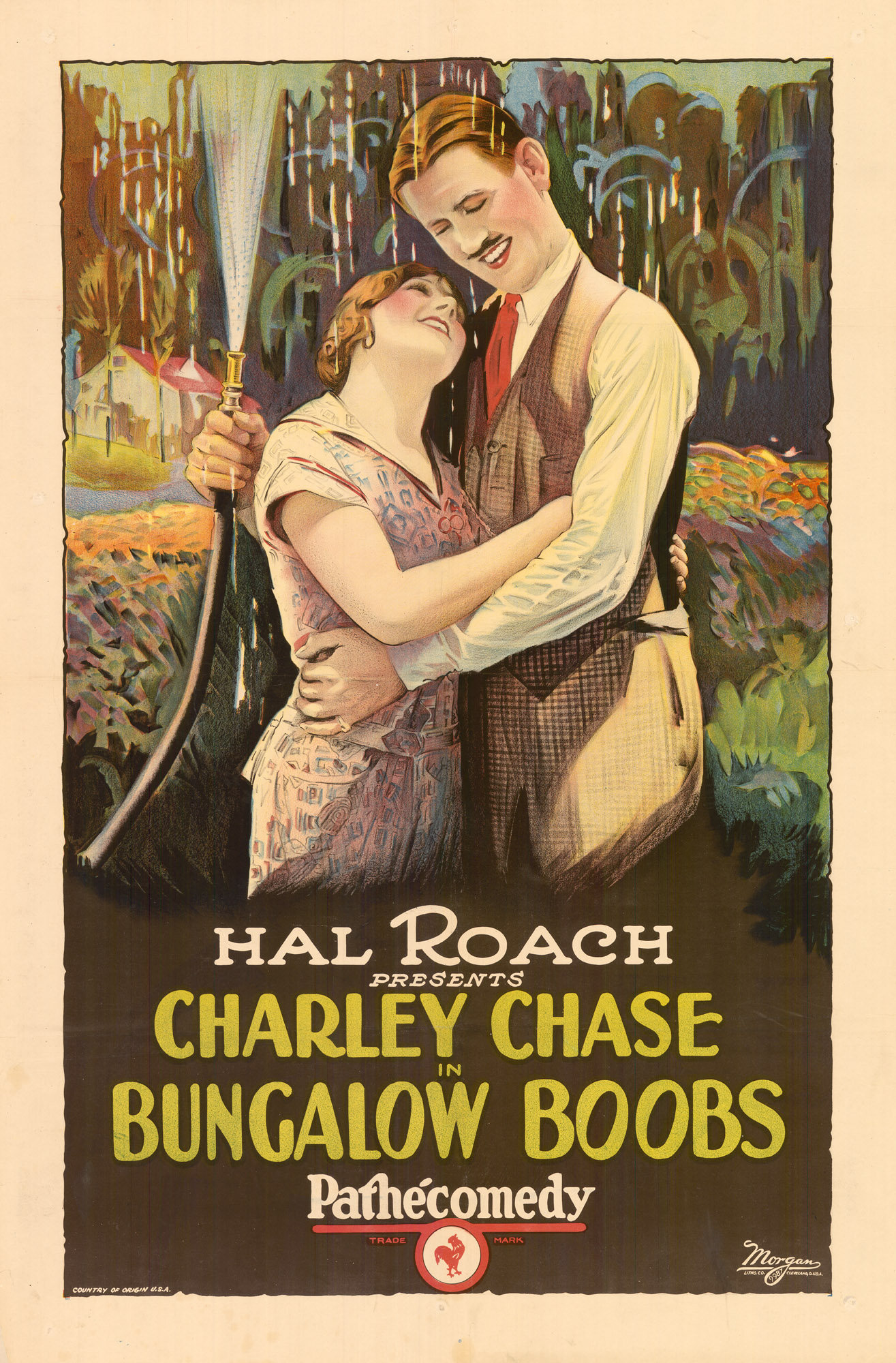
Poster for the comedic short Bungalow Boobs (1924), with the genre brand "Pathécomedy" and global Pathé rooster logo at the bottom

Pathé Exchange was the American branch of the major French film production and distribution studio Pathé. The branch emerged during the silent era in Hollywood. At its peak, it held nearly 50% of the American film production and distribution market. Known for its trailblazing newsreel and wide array of shorts, it grew out of the American division of the major French studio Pathé Frères, which began distributing films in the United States in 1904.

Ten years later, it produced the enormously successful The Perils of Pauline, a twenty-episode serial that came to define the genre. The operation was incorporated as Pathé Exchange toward the end of 1914 and spun off as an independent entity in 1921; the Merrill Lynch investment firm acquired a controlling stake. The following year, it released Robert J. Flaherty's groundbreaking documentary Nanook of the North. Other notable feature releases included the controversial drama Sex (1920) and director/producer Cecil B. DeMille's box-office-topping biblical epic The King of Kings (1927/28). During much of the 1920s, Pathé distributed the shorts of comedy pioneers Hal Roach and Mack Sennett and innovative animator Paul Terry. For Roach and then his own production company, acclaimed comedian Harold Lloyd starred in many feature and short releases from Pathé and the closely linked Associated Exhibitors, including the 1925 smash hit The Freshman.

In late 1926, controlling interest in the studio was acquired by investment banker Elisha Walker's Blair & Co. firm, which soon allied it with the Keith-Albee and Orpheum theater chains and in 1928 brought in financier and Hollywood maestro Joseph P. Kennedy to manage it. Under Kennedy, Pathé contracted with RCA Photophone for conversion to sound film and took over the assets of Producers Distributing Corporation, DeMille's former outlet. Finally, in January 1931, the studio was acquired by the much larger RKO Pictures. It continued making features as the semiautonomous division RKO Pathé into 1932, when all feature production was subsumed under the "RKO Radio Pictures" banner; the RKO Pathé unit and brand were maintained for short subjects and the trademark newsreel. The latter was purchased in 1947 from RKO by Warner Bros., which rebranded it Warner Pathé News. RKO Pathé, which in its final decade produced industrials and TV commercials along with theatrical shorts, closed its doors in 1956; Warners ended the newsreel the same year.

Pathé Exchange had survived as a small holding company for the few assets, including an East Coast film lab and a home-movie operation, that RKO had declined to acquire; the business was subsequently reorganized, first as Pathé Film Corporation and ultimately as Pathé Industries. The company reentered the movie production and distribution business for nearly a decade beginning in 1942 with the purchase of Poverty Row studio Producers Releasing Corporation (PRC) and Pathé's subsequent establishment of Eagle-Lion Films. Among the historically significant releases from this period are the film noir Detour (1945, PRC) and the science-fiction film Destination Moon (1950, Eagle-Lion). By 1951, Pathé Industries was out of the motion picture business. In 1961, its successor company, the America Corporation, briefly revived the brand with a distribution subsidiary, Pathé-America. It was sold the following year to Astor Pictures and soon dissolved.

== History ==
=== From silents to the early sound era ===
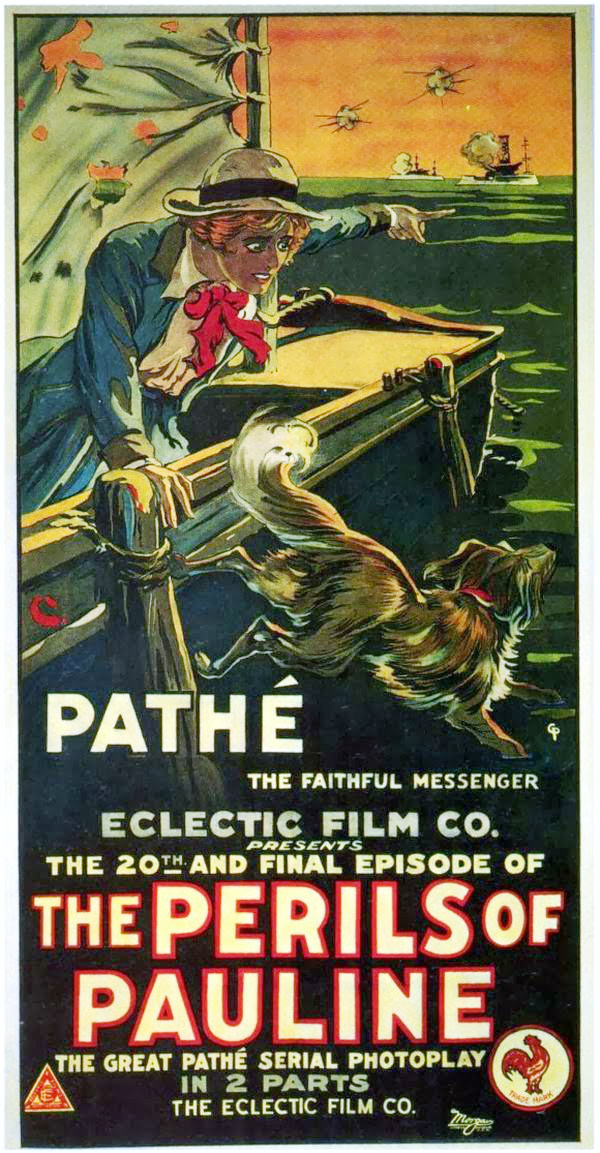
Poster for the final episode of The Perils of Pauline (1914), the genre-defining serial

Pathé Frères, founded in 1896 and by the middle of the next decade France's leading film studio, began distributing its films in the United States in 1904. By October 1906, its films commanded as much as 50 percent of the entire U.S. market. In 1908, Pathé Frères was invited to join the Motion Picture Patents Company (MPPC), created by a combine of production firms that aimed to lock up the American market completely. As a result, Pathé utilized MPPC's General Film Company distribution company to release its films. Pathé Frères established production facilities in New Jersey—first in East Bound Brook, then Jersey City—and leased an outdoor spread in Edendale, an L.A. suburb, for the shooting of Westerns. In 1911, the company launched the first ever newsreel produced in the United States, the Pathé Weekly; by early 1914, the renamed Pathé News was coming out five days a week. The year prior, alongside its General Film releases, Pathé also began distributing through the recently founded Eclectic Film Company, in which Pathé Frères was evidently a major investor.

In March 1914, from its studio in Jersey City (with many climactic scenes shot in the nearby film hub of Fort Lee), Pathé Frères entered the market for serials. Its initial such effort, The Perils of Pauline, starring Pearl White and codirected by company veteran Louis Gasnier, was a massive success, with popular demand so great that the original plan for thirteen episodes was extended to twenty and a record-breaking number of release prints were struck to supply exhibitors around the country. Several sequels followed, as the original, in the words of film historian Richard Lewis Ward, "became the hallmark for the genre". As of August 1914, Pathé's American release schedule, aside from its weekday newsreel, encompassed a Perils of Pauline chapter every other Monday, alternating with a "Cartoon Comedy or Comedy and Short Scenic Educational subjects in Natural Colors"; on Tuesdays, a one- or two-reel comedy; and on Wednesdays and Fridays, features of three reels or more. Later in the year, Pathé stopped releasing its films through General Film Company, acquired the Eclectic Film distribution exchanges, and formally incorporated an American subsidiary: Pathé Exchange. Investors Charles Merrill and Edmund Lynch, then just starting their careers, joined the company's board of directors in early 1915.

Released in April 1920, the drama Sex, starring Louise Glaum, was a hit across much of the country, though it caused controversy in some prudish precincts; the Pennsylvania Board of Censors required it be retitled Sex Crushed to Earth for distribution within the state. Pathé Frères cofounder Charles Pathé retired from the presidency of Pathé Exchange in September, and the following year the business was spun off from its French parent company, with a controlling stake acquired by Merrill Lynch. For many years, Pathé was closely associated with the distribution company Associated Exhibitors, which handled independent productions. Among Pathé's independent releases were the influential documentary feature Nanook of the North (1922), the first major commercial success in the genre. Its regular release schedule during this period revolved around its newsreel (now coming out twice a week), the "Pathéserials", cartoons by animator Paul Terry, and comedy shorts from Hal Roach and Mack Sennett. Trailblazing film comedians Laurel and Hardy (Roach), the Our Gang troupe (Roach), and Harry Langdon (Sennett) all first reached movie screens under the "Pathécomedy" banner.

By far Pathé's biggest star of this era, comedian Harold Lloyd, made many shorts for Roach, originally released by Pathé and then, beginning in May 1921, Associated Exhibitors. Lloyd shifted to features with the joint Pathé/Associated Exhibitors release A Sailor-Made Man that December. After four more full-length pictures with Roach—and a return to exclusive Pathé distribution—he launched his own production company with Girl Shy (1924). Following two further Pathé releases, including the massive hit The Freshman (1925), Lloyd departed for the major Paramount studio. Of the six feature films in Pathé Exchange history to reap $1 million or more in North American rentals, five were Lloyd vehicles. In October 1926, the ailing Associated Exhibitors was largely subsumed into Pathé. That same month, Merrill Lynch sold its controlling interest in the studio to fellow New York investment firm Blair & Co., headed by Elisha Walker.

Walker's firm proceeded to invest in Producers Distributing Corporation (PDC), known as star director Cecil B. DeMille's studio, and exchange Pathé stock interests with the Keith-Albee theater chain, which already owned 50 percent of PDC's holding company and had a national footprint through its alliance with the Orpheum circuit. In March 1927, an agreement was reached to merge Pathé and PDC under the former's aegis, with their films given preferential entrée to the Keith-Albee and Orpheum theaters; the arrangement was designed to allow the interlocked companies to compete with the production-distribution-exhibition combines that now ruled the movie industry: Paramount–Famous–Lasky, Loews–MGM, Stanley–First National–West Coast Theatres, and Fox Film and Theatres. Keith-Albee general manager John J. Murdock was named president of Pathé two months later. Hal Roach negotiated an exit from his Pathé contract and began putting out films through MGM in September, though he also produced a dozen pictures for Pathé's 1927–28 season as part of the exit deal.

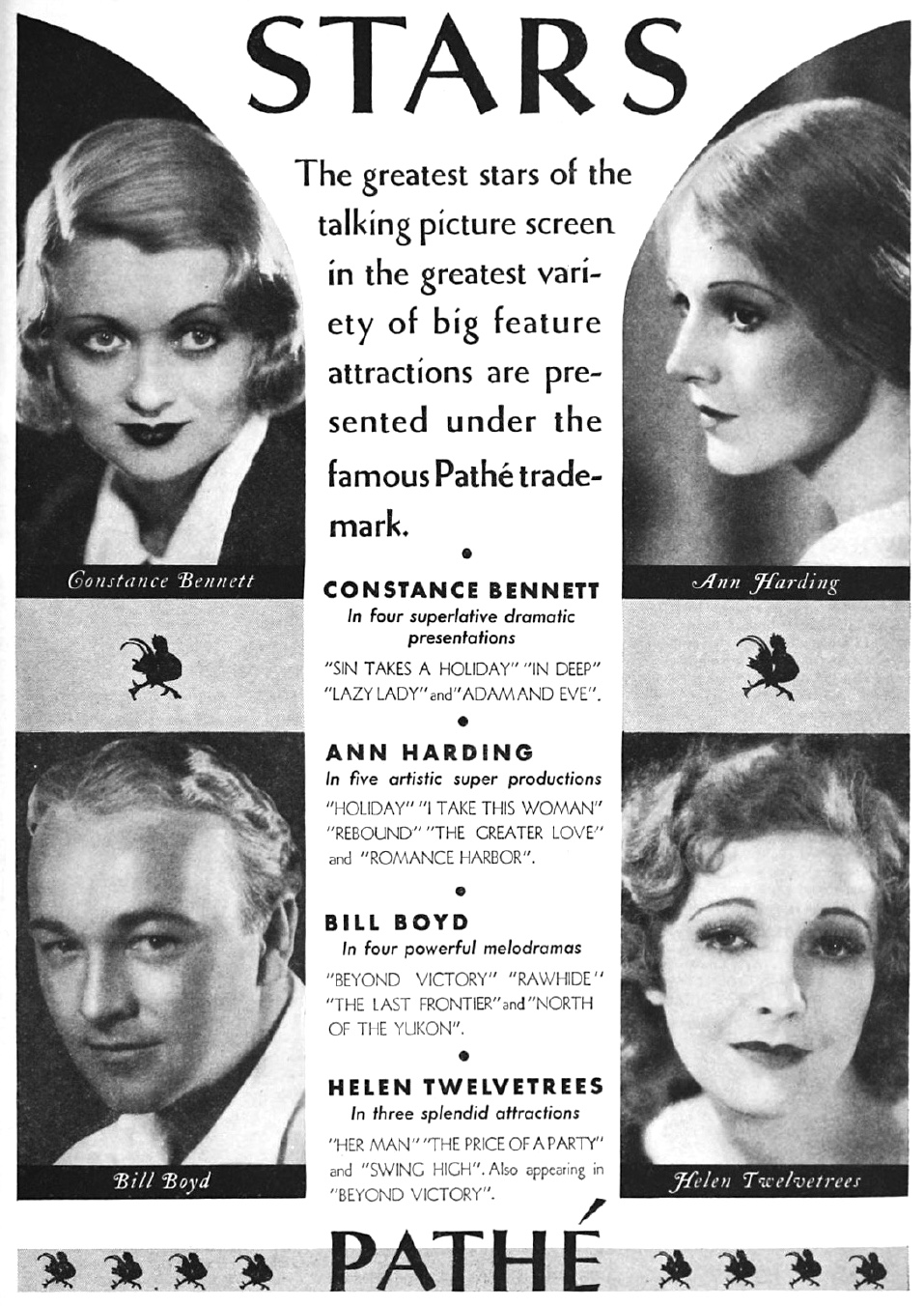
December 1930 Photoplay ad showing Pathé's top stars during the studio's final days

Early in 1928, Walker and Murdock turned to financier Joseph P. Kennedy, head of midsized studio Film Booking Offices of America (FBO), to help reorganize the debt-ridden Pathé business. One of Kennedy's first moves was to terminate the distribution deals with all of the studio's outside producers, including Mack Sennett. PDC was dissolved and its assets, including DeMille's Culver City production facility and the long-term lease on the adjacent backlot, were folded into Pathé. For the conversion to sound film production now understood as necessary across the industry, Kennedy contracted both Pathé and FBO to RCA Photophone, run by his sometime ally David Sarnoff.

On September 30, 1928, Pathé debuted its first partial sound film: a shortened version of The King of Kings, DeMille's epic about the last weeks of Jesus. The movie had been critically lauded the previous year as a silent road-show attraction handled by PDC; now in general release with music and sound effects, about forty minutes shorter, and playing across the recently united Keith-Albee-Orpheum (KAO) circuit, it was a major hit at the box office. The KAO merger had been formalized in January and by May the theater chain was largely under Walker and Kennedy's control. Pathé first true feature "talkie", Strange Cargo, opened on March 31, 1929. The following month, Kennedy had himself elected as chair of the Pathé board. A fire at Pathé's New York production facility that December killed eleven people and precipitated a shift of the studio's short-comedy unit to the West Coast, joining the feature productions in Culver City. Pathé struggled through 1930, putting out just a single feature each month between June and November; the July release, Holiday, managed to garner Academy Award nominations for lead actress Ann Harding and screenwriter Horace Jackson.

=== Later incarnations ===
In late 1930, Kennedy arranged for Pathé Exchange to be acquired by RKO Pictures, which had been built by Sarnoff in part on the bones of FBO, sold off by Kennedy and dissolved early the previous year; the official merger took place on January 31, 1931. The central assets involved were Pathé Exchange's motion picture production facilities, employee contracts, and distribution exchanges; four films completed by Pathé Exchange, two already in release, were included as well. The Pathé headliners who joined the RKO roster and starred in films from the new semiautonomous RKO Pathé production unit were led by Constance Bennett, Ann Harding, Helen Twelvetrees, William Boyd, Eddie Quillan, Robert Armstrong, and James Gleason. Around the time of the takeover, Pathé's range of shorts included its twice-weekly newsreel, a weekly "audio review", three biweekly series—Grantland Rice Sportlights, Aesop's Sound Fables, and Vagabond Adventure Series—the seasonal Knute Rockne Football Series, and an array of humorous two-reelers under the banners of Manhattan Comedies, Whoopee Comedies, Rainbow Comedies, Folly Comedies, Rodeo Comedies, Melody Comedies, Checker Comedies, Campus Comedies, and Capitol Comedies.

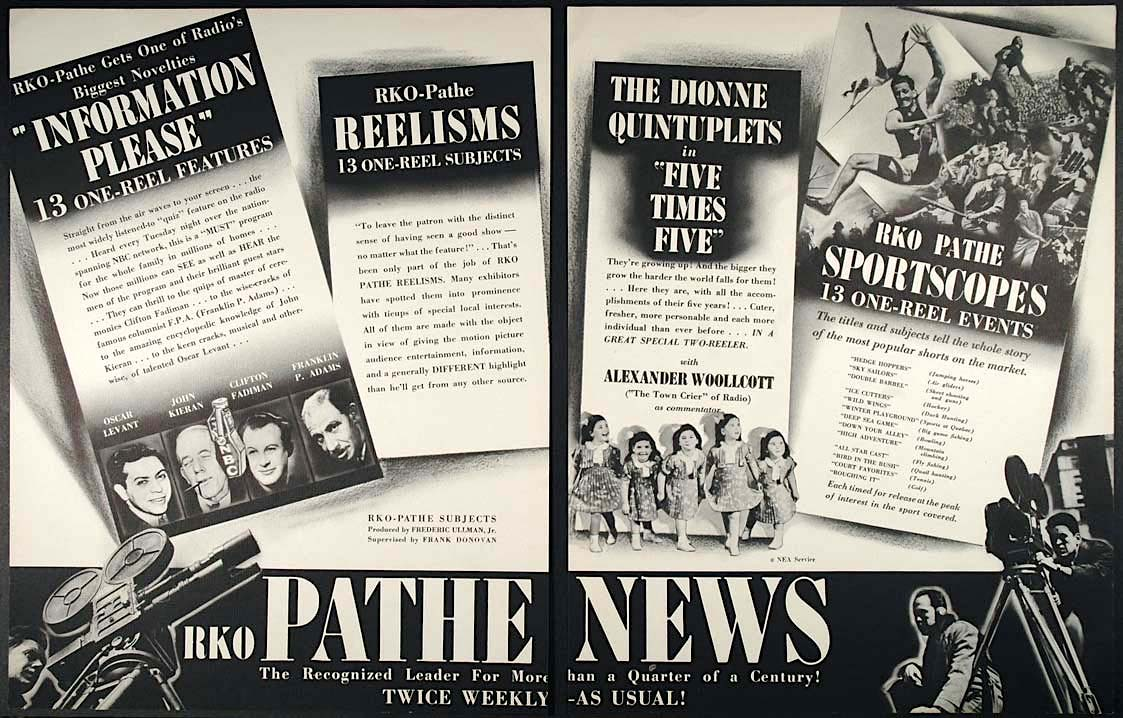
Flyer promoting RKO Pathé's 1939 releases—at this point, most of its shorts were one-reelers. Even within this single promotional item, a hyphen came and went in the brand name.

By the beginning of 1932, feature production had been shifted almost entirely from Culver City to RKO's main Hollywood studio, and in February the company announced that as of the 1932–33 exhibition season (beginning in September 1932) all of its features would come out under the RKO Radio Pictures banner. One of the last RKO Pathé features, What Price Hollywood?, with Bennett in the lead, came out on June 24; it was the first screen version of the story that would be filmed multiple times as A Star Is Born. In fact, due to extensive reshoots and recutting, the final feature release bearing the RKO Pathé emblem—the signature Pathé rooster standing proudly atop the RKO logo's spinning globe—Rockabye, didn't reach theaters until late November. The RKO Pathé brand was thenceforth limited to newsreels and shorts (plus one feature-length documentary in 1953). In 1947, RKO sold the Pathé newsreel operation to Warner Bros., which rebranded it Warner Pathé News. RKO Pathé continued to put out a reduced roster of theatrical shorts, along with industrials and TV commercials, until early 1956, when its doors closed for good. Later that year, Warners shut down the newsreel.

Pathé Exchange Inc. continued as a small holding company for the few assets that had not been part of the RKO acquisition, including most of the studio's film library, a film processing lab in New Jersey, a 49 percent stake in DuPont's raw film manufacturing operation, and a nontheatrical division that focused on the production of shorts for retail customers with home projectors. Kennedy, who had originally aimed to sell the company's remnants and dissolve it, instead stepped down from the board in April 1931. In 1935, the company was reorganized as Pathé Film Corporation (PFC), and most of the film library was sold to Columbia Pictures, which used the accompanying remake rights to produce such classics as The Awful Truth (1937) and Holiday (1938). The following year, after the completion of a hiatus imposed in the RKO deal, PFC reentered the filmmaking field in a small way, acquiring 8 percent of the recently established Grand National Films. The venture met with little success, and Grand National was dissolved in early 1940. In 1939, Pathé Film Corporation had bought a second film processing and printing facility, in Los Angeles, and established Pathé Laboratories Inc. of California as its operating subsidiary. The following year, financier Robert Young (no relation to the actor) acquired PFC; he officially dissolved the holding company while maintaining control of its various businesses.

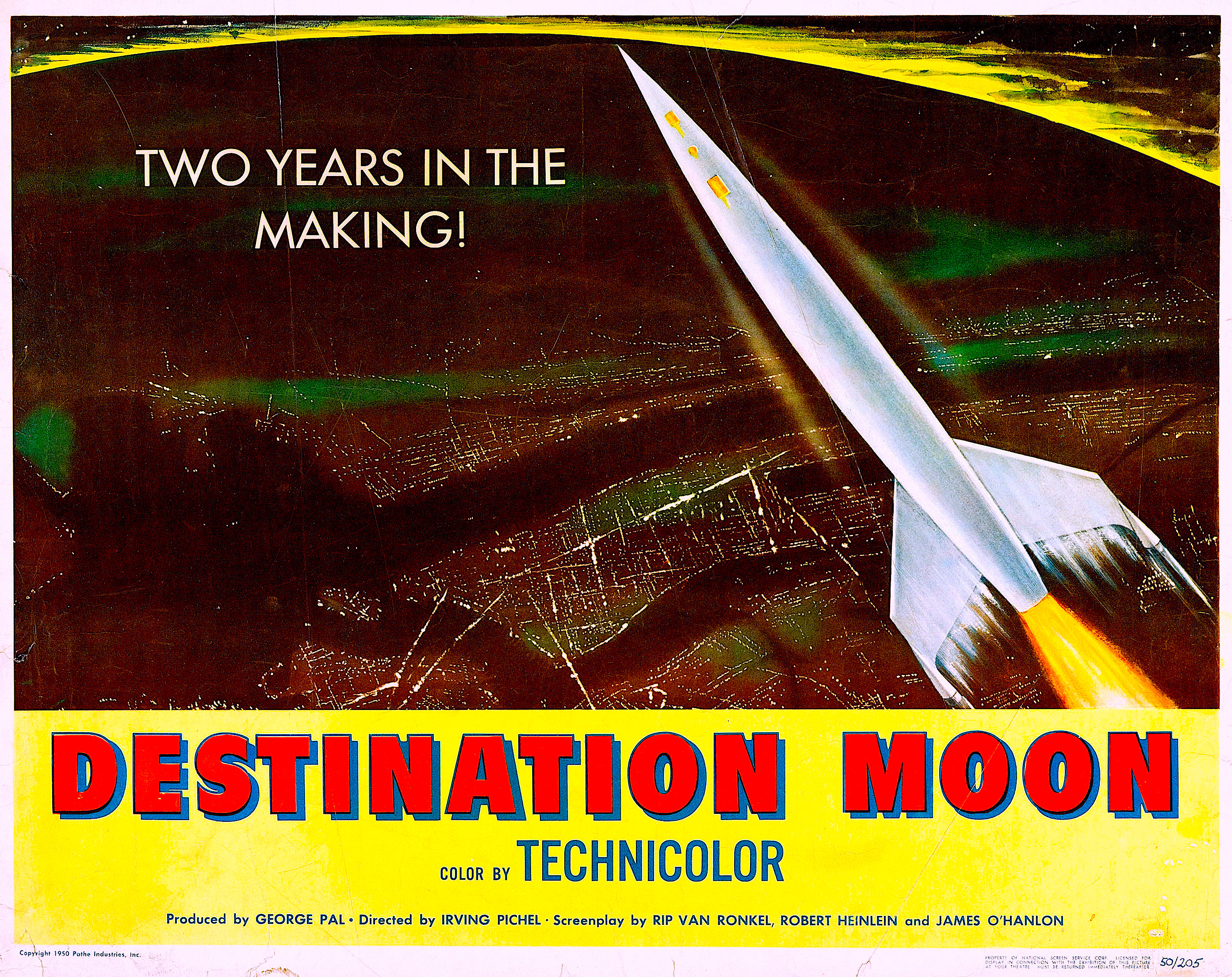
Poster for sci-fi classic Destination Moon (1950), a pioneering depiction of space travel. The George Pal production was a box-office hit for Eagle-Lion in Pathé Industries' last full year in the movie distribution business.

Pathé returned more fully to filmmaking in 1942, when Pathé Laboratories of California acquired Producers Releasing Corporation (PRC), a struggling Poverty Row studio notorious for the threadbare production values of its output. While PRC relied on independent producers for its release slate, Pathé management wanted to focus on in-house production, and a Sunset Boulevard production facility was purchased. PRC's initial "directly produced" feature, Jive Junction, was released in December 1943. Its director, Edgar G. Ulmer, already responsible for multiple PRC releases from outside producers, would make several more films at the studio, including the now renowned film noir Detour (1945). In June 1944, Young set up a new holding company, Pathé Industries, for the Pathé and PRC assets. Late the following year, Pathé Industries arranged to collaborate with British movie magnate J. Arthur Rank on the reciprocal release of Pathé and Rank productions; Pathé set up a new production subsidiary distinct from PRC, Eagle-Lion Films, while the American distribution firm Rank had established in 1944 under that name relinquished it.

The new Eagle-Lion Films was officially established in April 1946; entertainment lawyer Arthur B. Krim was brought on as studio president. An ambitious program of A-level productions was promised, although it was the former head of Warners' B unit, Bryan Foy, who was hired as studio chief. The first Eagle-Lion picture, It's a Joke, Son!, reached theaters in January 1947 and the firm soon became Pathé Industries' sole Hollywood flagship, with the announcement in August that PRC would be absorbed into Eagle-Lion. The studio's rare hits included an overachieving noir, Anthony Mann's T-Men (1947), and a Rank import, Michael Powell and Emeric Pressburger's The Red Shoes (1948). In late 1949, Eagle-Lion announced that it was ending in-house production, as Krim departed. N. Peter Rathvon, former president of RKO, joined the company to handle financing for the independent producers who would now provide all of its domestic output, such as George Pal, whose Destination Moon, released in June 1950, was a major success. That same month, Pathé merged Eagle-Lion with an independent distributor that focused on reissues, Film Classics, to create Eagle-Lion Classics. In October, the company sued the RKO and Loew's exhibition circuits for keeping its product out of New York theaters. With the suit still pending, in March 1951, Eagle-Lion Classics reported that 1950–51 would be its first profitable year, with the prospect that in-house production would resume. The next month, however, the studio was sold to United Artists, which had come under the control of Krim and his partner Robert Benjamin, former head of Rank's U.S. operations. Pathé was once again out of the movies. In 1953, Young replaced the Pathé Industries name with that of Chesapeake Industries. Three years later, the suit against the theater chains was dismissed.

After Young's death in 1958, Chesapeake was acquired by real estate developer William Zeckendorf. Redubbed the America Corporation, the firm revived the Pathé brand with a distribution subsidiary, Pathé-America, that handled independent productions from both the U.S. and Great Britain. During its brief 1961–62 existence, it released seven films under America Corporation ownership, including Sam Peckinpah's feature directorial debut, The Deadly Companions (1961), and Roger Corman's pathbreaking drama about racial demagoguery, The Intruder (1962). In late June 1962, Pathé-America was sold to Astor Pictures; after one more release in December, the brand was dropped.

== Filmography ==
The List of RKO Pictures films includes all of the RKO Pathé feature releases, but does not distinguish them from the films made by RKO's main production division, then branded as "Radio Pictures". For the RKO Pathé features, see The Early Sound Films of Pathé (1931–32).

Pathé Laboratories Inc. acquired a controlling interest in PRC in early January 1942 and purchased it outright by late February.

=== List of Pathé-America films ===
- The Deadly Companions (June 1961, Carousel Productions)
- Run Across the River (November 1961, Cameo Productions)
- Fear No More (November 1961, Scaramouche Productions)
- Victim (February 1962, Allied Film Makers (AFM) [UK])
- Whistle Down the Wind (April 1962, AFM/Beaver Films [UK])
- Paradise Alley (c. April/May 1962, Sutton Pictures)
- The Intruder (May 1962, Los Altos Productions)
- Out of the Tiger's Mouth (December 1962, Ruggles-Whelan Enterprises)
