= Forest of Death =

2007 Hong Kong film by Danny Pang

- Hong Kong theatrical poster

Chinese name
- Traditional Chinese: 森冤
- Simplified Chinese: 森冤
Transcriptions
Standard Mandarin
- Hanyu Pinyin: Sēn Yuān
Yue: Cantonese
- Jyutping: Sum1 Jyun1
- Directed by: Danny Pang
- Written by: Cub Chin; Danny Pang
- Produced by: Pang brothers; Alvin Lam; Cheung Hong-tat
- Starring: Shu Qi; Ekin Cheng
- Cinematography: Choochart Nantitanyatada
- Edited by: Curran Pang
- Music by: Payont Permsith
- Production companies: Universe Entertainment; Sil-Metropole Organisation; Magic Heart Film Production
- Distributed by: Universe Films
- Release date: 22 March 2007
- Running time: 85 minutes
- Country: Hong Kong
- Language: Cantonese

Forest of Death is a 2007 Hong Kong horror film directed, co-produced and co-written by Danny Pang, starring Shu Qi and Ekin Cheng.

== Plot ==
Police detective Ha Chun-chi is investigating a rape and murder that took place in a mysterious forest that has also been the scene of many suicides. The main suspect in the murder case is Patrick Wong, but he denies committing the crime.

Ha's investigation leads her to botanist Shum Shu-hoi, who has been experimenting with plants from the forest. Shum's girlfriend, May, feigns interest in the forest to gain information for a tabloid television show she works for.

Shum's experiments reveal that the plants can act as witnesses in the murder case, and sets up a re-enactment of the crime in the forest, where the plants will act as lie detectors.

== Cast ==
- Shu Qi as Detective Ha Chun-chi
- Ekin Cheng as Shum Shu-hoi
- Rain Li as May
- Lau Siu-ming as Mr. Tin, the forest ranger
- Lam Suet as Commissioner Wong
- Tommy Yuen as Shu-hoi's assistant
- Lawrence Chou as Patrick Wong
- Cub Chin as Producer

== Release ==
Forest of Death was released on Region 3 DVD in Hong Kong by Universe Laser on 10 May 2007. It also screened out of competition at the 2007 Bangkok International Film Festival.
