= Pang brothers =

Filmmaking duo of screenwriters and film directors

Danny Pang Phat Oxide Pang Chun
- Born: Danny Pang Phat; 1965 (age 60–61); British Hong Kong Oxide Pang Chun; 1965 (age 60–61); British Hong Kong
- Years active: 1997–present
- Spouse: Oxide: Angelica Lee
- Awards: Asia-Pacific Film Festival; Best Editing; 2004 Infernal Affairs II; Hong Kong Film Awards – Best Editing; 1999 The Storm Riders; 2003 Infernal Affairs

Chinese name
- Traditional Chinese: Danny: 彭發 Oxide: 彭順
- Simplified Chinese: Danny: 彭发 Oxide: 彭顺
Transcriptions
Standard Mandarin
- Hanyu Pinyin: Danny: Péng Fā Oxide: Péng Shùn
Yue: Cantonese
- Jyutping: Danny: Pang4 Fat3 Oxide: Pang4 Sun6

Danny Pang Phat and Oxide Pang Chun, collectively known as the Pang Brothers, are a filmmaking duo of screenwriters and film directors. The pair are twins, born in Hong Kong in 1965. Among their films is the hit Asian horror film, The Eye, which has spawned two sequels, as well as a Hollywood version also titled The Eye and a Hindi film called Naina. Besides working in Hong Kong, the pair frequently work in the Thai film industry, where they made their directorial debut as a team, Bangkok Dangerous.

== Early life ==
The Pang brothers grew up at Ka Wai Chuen in Hung Hom when they were young and studied at Kiangsu-Chekiang College (Shatin). The elder brother, Oxide, graduated from New Method College later.

== Early career ==
Oxide, the older of the two by 15 minutes, started his career in Bangkok, at Kantana Group's film labs as a telecine colorist. He made his first film, the experimental karmic thriller, Who Is Running?, in 1997. It was Thailand's entry for Academy Award for the Best Foreign Film for the 71st Academy Awards in 1998.

Danny is well known as a film editor, and has worked on a number of Hong Kong films, including The Storm Riders and the Infernal Affairs series.

They first teamed up to write and direct the Thai film, Bangkok Dangerous, in 1999. The film won the FIPRESCI Award at the 2000 Toronto International Film Festival and was nominated for best film and best editing at the Thailand National Film Association Awards.

They then made The Eye, which gained the Pangs wider critical acclaim. They made two sequels, The Eye 2 and The Eye 10. An American remake of The Eye was produced by Tom Cruise and Paula Wagner and stars Jessica Alba.

Aside from The Eye and other horror films, the Pangs made two more edgy Thai crime films in the same vein as Bangkok Dangerous, Danny with 1+1=0 and Oxide with Som and Bank: Bangkok for Sale. Together the three crime films form a loose "Bangkok Trilogy".

== Working style ==
When the Pangs work together, they direct scenes in the film independently of each other. Oxide Pang explains:

In a shooting location there is always only one Pang at a time; it helps us save our energy. One day I'll be shooting, the other, Danny will. I know a lot of people are amazed, but we do have a strong connection, I guess, as twins. And we have a lot of meetings on the script, we sit down in front of a storyboard and we have the same visuals conception.

== Other films ==
Their 2006 horror film, Re-cycle, was the closing film in the Un Certain Regard competition at the 2006 Cannes Film Festival. The film reunited the brothers with Angelica Lee, the star of The Eye.

Among their other projects are a Hollywood-backed, English-language film, a thriller called The Messengers, starring John Corbett, which was released in theatres on 2 February 2006, and a remake of Bangkok Dangerous starring Nicolas Cage.

Oxide produced a remake of Who Is Running? in 2005, called The Remaker, with Mona Nahm directing. He has completed a solo project, Diary, released in 2006. Another solo project for Oxide is The Detective, starring Aaron Kwok, about a detective trying to find a woman, with the only clue being a photograph of her.

Danny also completed a solo project, Forest of Death, a thriller about an enchanted forest. Another solo project by Danny, In Love with the Dead, opened in Hong Kong cinemas on 29 November 2007.

Both Diary and Forest of Death, as well as Re-cycle, were picked up for distribution in the United Kingdom by Image Entertainment. Currently they are working on the Thailand horror flick The Child's Eye, which is shot in 3D. Danny Pang directed solo the Chinese thriller film Fairy Tale Killer.

== Personal lives ==
In February 2010, Oxide Pang married Angelica Lee, the award-winning actress from The Eye, after dating for 7 years. Their wedding was held at the Pangkor Laut Resort. Together, the couple has twin boys, born on 8 July 2016.

Oxide also has a 13-year-old daughter from his previous marriage.

== Filmography ==
=== Danny and Oxide Pang ===
- Bangkok Dangerous (1999)
- The Eye (2002)
- Sung horn (Omen) (2003)
- The Eye 2 (2004)
- The Eye 10 (2005)
- Re-cycle (2006)
- The Messengers (2007)
- Bangkok Dangerous (remake, 2008)
- The Storm Warriors (2009)
- The Child's Eye (2010)
- Out of Inferno (2013)

=== Oxide Pang ===
==== As director ====
- Who Is Running? (1997)
- One Take Only (Som and Bank: Bangkok for Sale) (2001)
- Bangkok Haunted (2001)
- The Tesseract (2003)
- Ab-normal Beauty (2004)
- Diary (2006)
- The Detective (2007)
- Basic Love (2009)
- The Detective 2 (2011)
- Sleepwalker (2011)
- Conspirators (2013)
- Detective Gui (2015)
- My War (2016)
- The Big Call (2017)
- Flashover (2022)
- High Forces (2024)

=== Danny Pang ===
==== As director ====
- 1+1=0 (Nothing to Lose) (2002)
- Leave Me Alone (2004)
- Forest of Death (2007)
- In Love with the Dead (2007)
- Fairy Tale Killer (2012)
- The Strange House (2015)

==== As editor ====
- The Storm Riders (1998)
- Infernal Affairs (2002)
- Infernal Affairs II (2003)
- Infernal Affairs III (2003)
- The Park (2003)
- Sung horn (Omen) (2003)
- The Eye 2 (2004)
- Bar Paradise (2005)
- The Messengers (2007)
