= The Heavenly Kings =

2006 Hong Kong film by Daniel Wu

- Traditional Chinese: 四大天王
- Simplified Chinese: 四大天王
- Hanyu Pinyin: si da tian wang
- Jyutping: sei dai tin wong
- Directed by: Daniel Wu
- Written by: Daniel Wu
- Produced by: Conroy Chan; Andrew Lin; Daniel Wu; Terence Yin; Patrick Lee
- Starring: Daniel Wu; Terence Yin; Andrew Lin; Conroy Chan
- Cinematography: Kim Chan; Phat Chan
- Edited by: Kim Chan; Phat Chan
- Music by: Jun Kung
- Distributed by: Golden Scene
- Release date: 20 April 2006
- Running time: 86 minutes
- Country: Hong Kong
- Language: Cantonese

The Heavenly Kings (四大天王) is a 2006 Hong Kong film directed by Daniel Wu.

== Background ==
In 2005, Chinese media began to report that Daniel Wu had formed a boyband, Alive, with Terence Yin, Andrew Lin and Conroy Chan. Wu and his band mates posted information, updates, personal thoughts (including slamming Hong Kong Disneyland, for which they were spokespersons) and the band's music, at their official website. In 2006, Wu made his writing and directorial debut with The Heavenly Kings, which chronicles Alive's formation and exploits. After the film's release, however, it was revealed that The Heavenly Kings was actually a mockumentary of the Hong Kong pop music industry and Alive was constructed purely as a vehicle to make the movie; the film's characters represented only 10-15% of their real-life counterparts and much of the footage blurred the line between fiction and reality. Wu admitted his own singing voice "sucked really bad," and the band had their voices digitally enhanced for its music, to prove that "it's easy to fake it."

== Cast and roles ==
- Conroy Chan Chi-Chung - Himself
- Jackie Chan - Cameo (uncredited)
- Jaycee Chan - Cameo
- Jacky Cheung - Cameo
- Stephen Fung - Cameo
- Josie Ho - Cameo (uncredited)
- Tony Ho
- Ella Koon - Cameo (uncredited)
- Jo Kuk - Kei Kei (as Jo Koo)
- Andrew Lin - Himself
- Candy Lo - Cameo
- Karen Mok - Cameo
- Jason Tobin - Sandy
- Nicholas Tse - Cameo
- Paul Wong - Cameo
- Daniel Wu - Himself
- Miriam Yeung - Cameo
- Terence Yin - Himself

== Reception ==
Despite some backlash from the media over being intentionally fed false information in the movie about illegal downloads of the band's music, Wu won the best new director award for the film at the 26th Hong Kong Film Awards, an achievement he called "a group effort." The film has also been nominated for Best Original Film Song at the same Awards ceremony: Composer: Davy Chan; Lyricist: Li Jin Yi and Singer: Alive.
