= My Name Is Fame =

2006 Hong Kong film by Lawrence Ah Mon

- Chinese film poster
- Traditional Chinese: 我要成名
- Simplified Chinese: 我要成名
- Hanyu Pinyin: Wǒ Yào Chéng Míng
- Jyutping: Ngo2 Jiu3 Sing4 Ming4
- Directed by: Lawrence Ah Mon
- Written by: James Yuen; Jessica Fong; Law Yiu-fai
- Produced by: Henry Fong; Shan Dong-bing
- Starring: Lau Ching-wan; Huo Siyan
- Cinematography: Choi Shung-fai; Tam Chi-wai; Ng Man-ching
- Edited by: Angie Lam
- Music by: Henry Lai Wan-man
- Production companies: BMA Motion Pictures; Polybona Films
- Release date: 1 September 2006 (Hong Kong)
- Running time: 94 minutes
- Country: Hong Kong
- Language: Cantonese

My Name Is Fame is a 2006 Hong Kong comedy-drama film starring Lau Ching-wan as a has-been actor and newcomer Huo Siyan as an aspiring actress and his apprentice.

The movie is considered by many as a humorous reflection of Lau's actual career, which is highly regarded but almost unrewarded (Lau has never won a Hong Kong Film Award before this film which won him the Best Actor award).

While it is often compared to the three A Star Is Born films, My Name Is Fame departs from many of Star's clichés, notably dispensing with the romance of the old man-young girl relationship and the destructive spiral of the old man's career. While the girl does go onto great success, the man does redeem himself of bad habits (getting sober, offering constructive instead of abrasive criticism) and returns to being a well-renowned actor. Due to their busy film schedules, they never have time to meet. But at the end, she presents a best supporting actor award for which he has been nominated.

Many famous actors and filmmakers make cameo appearances, notably Tony Leung Ka-fai, who plays himself and tells Lau's character to return to acting, saying that while good roles are difficult to find, perseverance will be rewarded.

== Plot ==
Poon Kar-Fai (Lau Ching-wan) is an actor who was once in the lime light and ended up throwing it all away through arrogance.

== Cast ==
=== Main cast ===
- Lau Ching-wan as Poon Ka-fai
- Huo Siyan as Faye Ng
- Candice Yu as Qiqi
- Wayne Lai as Wai
- Kong Hon as Ka-fai's father
- Leung San as Ka-fai's mother
- Derek Tsang as Lok

=== Guest appearances ===
==== Actors ====
- Tony Leung Ka-fai as himself
- Ekin Cheng as himself
- Fiona Sit as herself
- Niki Chow as herself
- Remus Choi as himself
- Calvin Choi as himself
- Edmund So as himself
- Lau Dan as himself
- Jo Kuk as herself
- Ku Feng as himself

==== Directors ====
- Ann Hui as herself
- Gordon Chan as himself
- Samson Chiu as himself
- Stephen Tung as himself
- Fruit Chan as himself
- Vincent Chui as himself
- Jamie Luk as himself
- Matthew Tang as himself

=== Other cast ===
- Elena Kong as Ms. Hung
- Henry Fong as Marco
- Tsui Na as Shopkeeper
- To Ting-ho as Andy
- Muk Sing as Photographer
- Wai Wai as May
- Law Yiu-fai as TV director
- Four Tse as Gaffer
- Almert Mak as Assistant director
- Jimmy Wong as Assistant director
- Jimmy Wong as Production manager
- Julie Lau as Production manager
- Keith Chan as Production manager
- Lai Ka-ho as Production manager
- Jin Hui as TV production assistant
- Lau Ka-fai as Cinematographer

== Awards and nominations ==
Awards and nominations
Ceremony	Category	Recipient	Outcome
26th Hong Kong Film Awards	Best Actor	Lau Ching-wan	Won
26th Hong Kong Film Awards	Best Supporting Actress	Candice Yu	Nominated
26th Hong Kong Film Awards	Best Screenplay	James Yuen, Jessica Fong, Law Yiu-fai	Nominated
26th Hong Kong Film Awards	Best New Performer	Huo Siyan	Nominated
