= Xi Xi =

Hong Kong author and poet (1937–2022)

Cheung Yin
- 張彥
- Born: 7 October 1937; Shanghai, China
- Died: 18 December 2022 (aged 85)
- Education: Heep Yunn School, Grantham College of Education
- Occupations: Teacher; novelist; poet
- Writing career
- Pen name: Xi Xi
- Notable works: Shops; My City; A Woman Like Me; Mourning a Breast

Xi Xi (Chinese: 西西; Cantonese Yale: sāi sāi; pinyin: Xī Xī; 7 October 1937 – 18 December 2022) was the pseudonym of the Hong Kong author and poet Ellen Cheung Yin (Chinese: 張彥; Cantonese Yale: jēung yin; pinyin: Zhāng Yàn). She was born in Shanghai, and moved to Hong Kong at the age of twelve. She was formerly a teacher and had been a Hong Kong–based writer. Her works are also popular in Taiwan and mainland China. She had become a rather well-known figure to many secondary school students in Hong Kong. This was due in particular to one of her essays, "Shops" (店鋪), which was adopted as reading material for the Chinese Language paper in the Hong Kong Certificate of Education Examination (HKCEE) by the Hong Kong Examinations Authority of the time. In 2019, Xi Xi was the recipient of the Newman Prize for Chinese Literature.

== Childhood ==
Cheung Yin
- Traditional Chinese: 張彥
- Cantonese Yale: jēung yìn
- Jyutping: Zoeng1 Jin6
Transcriptions
Standard Mandarin
- Hanyu Pinyin: Zhāng Yàn
Yue: Cantonese
- Yale Romanization: jēung yìn
- Jyutping: Zoeng1 Jin6

Pseudonym
- Chinese: 西西
- Cantonese Yale: sāi sāi
- Jyutping: Sai1 Sai1
Transcriptions
Standard Mandarin
- Hanyu Pinyin: Xī Xī
- Wade–Giles: Hsi^{1} Hsi^{1}
Yue: Cantonese
- Yale Romanization: sāi sāi
- Jyutping: Sai1 Sai1

Xi Xi's ancestors came from Xiangshan County in Guangdong. She was born in Pudong, Shanghai, where she would go on to attend primary school. Xi Xi was born in 1937, though her Hong Kong identity card showed her year of birth as 1938. She thus believed that 1938 was her year of birth over the course of her life, until she consulted family documents following the death of her sister in the 2010s, and found out that she was actually born in 1937. In 1950, she immigrated to Hong Kong with her parents. Her father worked at Kowloon Motor Bus Company (KMB) as a ticket checker. Additionally, he had been a coach for a Division A football club, later becoming a referee since he was in Shanghai, thus Xi Xi developed an immense interest in football when she was young. Xi Xi was born as one of five children of her parents, two brothers and two sisters.

Xi Xi attended secondary school at Heep Yunn School, where lessons were taught in Cantonese; she started her English-instructed lessons from Form 4. As a junior secondary school student, she began to write for the local newspapers and magazines.

According to her in A Girl Like Me, the character 西 in her pen name is a pictogram symbolizing a girl playing hopskotch, which was her favourite game during childhood.

== Early writing career ==
Xi Xi's first piece of published writing, a fourteen-line modern Chinese poem, was published in Everyone's Literature (人人文學) in the 1950s. When Xi Xi was studying in Form 3, she won the first prize in the senior section of a writing competition organised by Learn-Mates (學友). In 1957, she continued her studies at the Grantham College of Education (later merged with other constitute colleges to form the Hong Kong Institute of Education), and became a teacher at Farm Road Government Primary School after graduation. Besides poetry, novels, essays, fairy tales and translated literature, Xi Xi also wrote TV screenplays in the 1960s, like The Dark Green Age (黛綠年華) and The Window (窗), as well as numerous film reviews. She was a pioneer in the field of experimental film in Hong Kong.

As well as contributing to multiple newspaper and magazine columns, she was the editor of Chinese Students' Weekly poetry section (1960s), as well as Thumb Weekly (大拇指周報) (1975–1977) and Plain Leaf Literature (素葉文學) (1981–1984), which was the 68-volume magazine first published in 1980 by Su Yeh Publications, a publishing company founded by Xi Xi and her friends. Su Yeh Publications dedicated itself to publishing works by Hong Kong authors. Up until 1984, the publishing company had produced books in 22 categories, including A Loafer Who Burnt His Guitar (焚琴的浪子), a collection of Ma Lang's (馬朗) poems; A Tour in Mirrors (鏡遊), a Chinese movie critic's collection by Lin Nian-Tong (林年同); and My Resplendence (我的燦爛), an essay and poem collection by Zhong Ling-Ling (鍾玲玲). The publishing company continued its paper-based publishing until 2015.

== Novels and short stories ==
My City was published in 1979. Originally a serial on the newspaper Hong Kong Express, she presented the world as seen through young people's eyes. She also illustrated the serial with her own drawings, attached along with each publication in the newspaper. While the serial was not an attempt to critique social issues, it nevertheless tackled issues such as overcrowded spaces and overloading academic pressure. It has now become a staple in Hong Kong literature, ranked 51st by the Yazhou Zhoukan as one of the 100 best Chinese novels in the 20th century. It also became the inspiration for the 2015 documentary My City directed by Fruit Chan.

Deer Hunt, published in 1982, was inspired by the history during the Qing Dynasty when Qianlong was emperor. The novel described a plan of assassinating the emperor, and the remembrance of the emperor to his grandfather Kangxi. It was reprinted twice in Taiwan, once in 1986 and once in 1999.

Xi Xi enjoyed travelling; she visited many countries in Eastern Europe, as well as Turkey, Egypt, Greece, and, most frequently, mainland China. Travelling to these places did much to inspire her writing. In 1983, United Daily News published Xi Xi's A Woman Like Me (像我這樣的一個女子), a collection of short stories written between 1976 and 1982, and it was the first time her works were introduced to Taiwanese people. The collection won Xi Xi the Recommended Novella Prize, the highest honour in the United Daily News 8th Novel awards.

The 1992 novel Mourning a Breast (哀悼乳房) was written in order to document her feelings, thoughts, and encounters during her treatment with breast cancer, which she was diagnosed with in 1989. Due to the complications of her cancer surgery, she lost the function of her right hand by 1999 and had to write with her left hand. The novel was nominated by the China Times in 1992 as one of the ten best books of the year. It also provided the inspiration for the 2006 movie 2 Become 1 starring Miriam Yeung.

== Later writing career ==
"Shops" is an essay written by Xi Xi, which was adopted as the reading material for the Chinese language paper of the HKCEE. This passage depicted the ageing buildings, squatters, and old-fashioned traditional shops in Central and Western District, particularly in Sheung Wan and Sai Ying Pun, as well as other activity in this hustling district. She expressed her nostalgia towards her childhood, and the reminiscence towards the disappearing old shops due to the drastic urban development.

Flying Carpet (飛氈), a novel inspired by the history of Hong Kong in the past one hundred years, was published in 1999. In the novel, Hong Kong was given the name of Fertillia (肥土鎮), a town at the edge of Dragonland (巨龍國), a projection of China, and the novel described how the town transformed in three generations.

In 2009, Xi Xi published the essay and photograph collection, The Teddy Bear Chronicles (縫熊志). She donated the teddy bears sewn and photographed in the book to the Chinese University of Hong Kong Library in 2018. In 2016, a collection of poems by Xi Xi was published in English under the title Not Written Words, which received the Lucien Stryk Asian Translation Prize in 2017. In 2019, Xi Xi was awarded the Newman Prize for Chinese Literature and the Cikada Prize.

== List of works ==
=== Novels ===
- My City (1979), trans. Eva Hung (Renditions, Hong Kong, 1993)
- Deer Hunt (1982)
- Mourning a Breast (哀悼乳房) (1992), trans. Jennifer Feeley (New York Review Books, 2024)
- Flying Carpet (飛氈) (1999), trans. Diana Yue (Hong Kong University Press, 2000)

=== Short stories ===
- A Woman Like Me (像我這樣的一個女子) (1983) [translated into English by Stephen C. Soong as A Girl Like Me and other stories (Renditions, Hong Kong, 1986]

=== Poetry collection ===
- Not Written Words
- Carnival of Animals: Xi Xi’s Animal Poems (2023). Edited by Fuk-yan Ho, translated by Jennifer Feeley.

=== Newspaper and magazine columns ===
- A fairytale column in Tin Tin Daily (天天日報)
- "Movies and Me" (電影與我) in Chinese Students' Weekly (中國學生周報)
- "Bull's Eye and Me" (牛眼和我) in Express Daily (快報)
- "My Scrawling Room" (scrapbook) (《我之試寫室》剪貼冊) in Express Daily
- "Notes on Reading" (閱讀筆記) in Express Daily
- "The Flower Column" in Sing Tao Daily
- "Four Pieces of Jade" (四塊玉) in United Daily News
- "Siu Ming Chow" (小明周) in Ming Pao
- "Ear-man" (隨耳想) in Sing Tao Daily
- "How Xi Xi Views Soccer" (西西看足球) in Ming Pao

=== Essays ===
- Shops
- The Teddy Bear Chronicles (縫熊志) (2009)

== Portrait ==
- Xi Xi. A Portrait by Kong Kai Ming at Portrait Gallery of Chinese Writers (Hong Kong Baptist University Library).
