= Isabella (2006 film) =

2006 Hong Kong film by Pang Ho-cheung

- Promotional poster
- Traditional Chinese: 伊莎貝拉
- Simplified Chinese: 伊莎贝拉
- Directed by: Pang Ho-Cheung
- Screenplay by: Pang Ho-Cheung; Kearen Pang; Derek Tsang; Jimmy Wan
- Story by: Pang Ho-Cheung
- Produced by: Pang Ho-Cheung; Chapman To; Jin Zhongqiang
- Starring: Chapman To; Isabella Leong; Anthony Wong
- Cinematography: Charlie Lam
- Edited by: Wenders Li
- Music by: Peter Kam
- Production companies: Media Asia Films; China Film Group; Not Brothers Inc.
- Distributed by: Media Asia Distribution Ltd. (Hong Kong)
- Release date: 6 April 2006
- Running time: 109 minutes
- Country: Hong Kong
- Languages: Cantonese; Mandarin
- Box office: $269,556

Isabella (traditional Chinese: 伊莎貝拉; simplified Chinese: 伊莎贝拉; pinyin: yī shā bèi lā; Cantonese Yale: Yi Sa Bui Lai) is a 2006 Hong Kong film directed by Pang Ho-Cheung and starring Chapman To, Isabella Leong and Anthony Wong. It played in competition at the 56th annual Berlin International Film Festival, where it won the Silver Bear for best film music (it was nominated for the Golden Bear as well). The film is set in Macau.

== Plot ==
On the eve of the Portuguese handover of Macau, a single cop, Shin (To), under suspicion of corruption, meets in a bar the teenage daughter he didn't know he had, Yan (Leong). She insists on moving in with him and he has to get to know her and help sort out her problems and amend his promiscuous lifestyle.

== Cast ==
- Chapman To
- Isabella Leong
- Anthony Wong
- Josie Ho
- Jim Chim
- Steven Cheung
- Shawn Yue
- Wan Yeung-ming

== Awards ==
- Silver Bear, Film Music – 2006 Berlin International Film Festival
- Golden Bear, Best Film – 2006 Berlin International Film Festival (Nominated)
- Best original film score of 26th Hong Kong Film Awards

== See also ==
- List of Hong Kong films
- List of films set in Macau
