= Sleepwalker (2011 film) =

2011 Hong Kong film by Oxide Pang

Sleepwalker 夢遊3D
- Film poster
- Directed by: Oxide Pang
- Screenplay by: Oxide Pang; Thomas Pang
- Produced by: Oxide Pang; Alvin Lam
- Starring: Angelica Lee; Charlie Yeung; Huo Siyan
- Cinematography: Ng Man-Ching; Decha Srimantra
- Edited by: Curran Pang
- Production companies: Universe Entertainment; Beijing Enlight Pictures
- Release date: 3 November 2011 (Hong Kong)
- Running time: 105 minutes
- Country: Hong Kong
- Language: Cantonese

Sleepwalker (Chinese: 夢遊3D) is a 2011 Hong Kong horror crime film produced, written and directed by Oxide Pang. It premiered in Hong Kong on 3 November 2011.

== Plot ==
Yi is repeatedly haunted by a mysterious dream in which she encounters an unfamiliar man. When the man eventually appears in her waking life, Yi's past resurfaces as she becomes a suspect in the murder of her former husband. As the dream continues to unfold, its events increasingly seem connected to the crime, leaving Yi uncertain about what is real and what she has merely dreamed.

== Cast ==
- Angelica Lee
- Charlie Yeung
- Huo Siyan
- Li Zhonghan
- Paw Hee-ching
- Kent Cheng
