= Delusion (2016 film) =

2016 Chinese-Hong Kong film by Danny Pang

- Poster
- Traditional Chinese: 妄想症
- Jyutping: Mong^{5} Soeng^{2} Zing^{3}
- Directed by: Danny Pang Phat
- Written by: Li Yongqin
- Produced by: Karen Fu; Danny Pang Phat
- Starring: Pakho Chau; An Hu; Cici; Cheng Yuanyuan
- Cinematography: Zhang Ruigeng
- Edited by: Danny Pang Phat; Li Yongqin
- Music by: Wong Kin-Wai
- Production companies: Beijing Weishi Brother Entertainment; Huace Pictures (Tianjing); Shenyang Weishi Brother Media; Guangzhou Pinjing Film & Television Production
- Distributed by: Huace Pictures (Tianjing)
- Release date: 6 May 2016 (China)
- Running time: 90 minutes
- Countries: China; Hong Kong
- Language: Mandarin
- Box office: CN¥1.6 million

Delusion (Chinese: 妄想症) is a 2016 suspense thriller film directed by Danny Pang Phat and starring Pakho Chau, An Hu, Cici and Cheng Yuanyuan. A Chinese-Hong Kong co-production, it was released in China by Huace Pictures on 6 May 2016.

== Plot ==
The heroine played by Charlene Choi has the habit of keeping a diary. One day she meets Yu Wenle on the street, who looks like the‘him’ in her diary, so she doesn't care who he is or whether he has a girlfriend or not, she brings him home, cooks for him, and falls in love with him.

In the first third of the film, everything seems normal, but the atmosphere is a bit strange, and Charlene Choi's demeanour is sometimes like amnesia and sometimes like sleepwalking, just like many girls who long for love but have no one to love them. Her family and colleagues do not appear in the film, and her relationship with her neighbours is not good. Except for Leung Loh Sze, who occasionally talks to her, she spends most of the time alone, cooking, making puppets, writing in her diary, and staying in a daze. When the audience could not explain the doubts in their minds, the voice-over said that modern people often suffer from paranoia due to loneliness and anxiety, producing hallucinations and hallucinations, and in serious cases, developing into schizophrenia.

The film tells three intertwined stories of psychologist Li Yulin, writer Lin Zichen, and police officer Li Wei. Li Yulin treats a delusional patient who believes they are being followed by a mysterious organization. Lin Zichen, while writing a novel about delusion, gradually blurs the lines between reality and fantasy. Li Wei, investigating a series of bizarre murders, discovers clues related to delusional patients. As the plot progresses, the three storylines converge, revealing a shocking truth: behind Lin Zichen's novel and Li Wei's cases lies a massive psychological experiment. The boundaries between reality and delusion gradually disappear, and the three are drawn into a complex vortex of psychology and reality.

== Cast ==
- Pakho Chau
- An Hu
- Cici
- Cheng Yuanyuan
- Timmy Hung

== Reception ==
The film grossed CN¥1.6 million at the Chinese box office.
