= Who Is Running? =

Ta fa likit
- Film poster
- Directed by: Oxide Pang Chun
- Written by: Oxide Pang Chun
- Produced by: Exsun Binhasun; Jareuk Kanjareuk
- Starring: Sanya Kunakorn; Nattarika Thumpridanun; Suchao Pongwilai; Vichitra Triyakul; Asa Hasin; Yawtchai Phaikhayaat
- Cinematography: Sintop Soporn
- Edited by: Danny Pang
- Music by: Jinglebell
- Distributed by: Kantana Motion Picture Company
- Release date: 4 October 1997
- Running time: 105 minutes
- Country: Thailand
- Language: Thai

Who is Running? (Thai: ท้าฟ้าลิขิต or Ta fa likit) is a 1997 Thai drama film directed by Oxide Pang Chun. The directorial debut of Oxide Pang, it was Thailand's official entry to the Academy Awards in 1998.

== Plot ==
The story follows Daeng (Ray MacDonald), a young man living a mundane life in Bangkok until he discovers a mysterious newspaper that arrives at his doorstep every morning. However, the newspaper is not for the current day; it is dated for the following day, accurately reporting events—including accidents and deaths—before they happen.

Initially, Daeng is skeptical, but after witnessing a predicted fatal accident occur exactly as described, he realizes he has the power to intervene. He begins a frantic, one-man mission to save the people listed in the "obituaries" of the future. His interventions successfully change the course of fate for several strangers, but he soon notices a disturbing pattern: every time he saves a life, the "universe" attempts to correct itself, often leading to more chaotic or unforeseen consequences.

As Daeng becomes obsessed with his role as a savior, his mental and physical health begin to decline. The tension reaches a climax when he opens the newspaper to find his own name and photo listed in the following day's death notices. The film explores themes of predestination, the ethics of interference, and the Thai concept of Kamma (Karma), as Daeng must decide whether to accept his fate or attempt one final, desperate run against time.

== Cast ==
- Sanya Kunakorn as Jiab
- Nattarika Thumpridanun as Wan
- Suchao Pongwilai
- Vichitra Triyakul
- Asa Hasin
- Yawtchai Phaikhayaat

== See also ==
- List of submissions to the 71st Academy Awards for Best Foreign Language Film
- List of Thai submissions for the Academy Award for Best Foreign Language Film
