= Koma (film) =

2004 Hong Kong film by Law Chi-leung

- Theatrical poster
- Directed by: Law Chi-Leung
- Screenplay by: Susan Chan
- Story by: Yeung Sin-Ling
- Produced by: Lawrence Cheng
- Starring: Karena Lam; Angelica Lee; Andy Hui
- Cinematography: Chan Chi-Ying
- Edited by: Eric Kwong Chi-Leung
- Music by: Chan Kwong-wing
- Production companies: Filmko Entertainment; Camera Media
- Release date: April 22, 2004
- Running time: 88 minutes
- Country: Hong Kong
- Language: Cantonese

Koma (Chinese: 救命) is a 2004 Hong Kong psychological thriller directed by Law Chi-Leung, starring Karena Lam and Angelica Lee.

== Plot ==
Having attended a wedding party held in a hotel and became drunk, a young woman, wakes to realize in horror that her kidney has been surgically removed. Socialite Ching (Angelica Lee), who also attended the party, identified Ling (Karena Lam) as the prime suspect because she found out that Ling was the only stranger presented in the ball room. She is unknown to everyone in the party, even to the hotel staff. During the police investigation, Ching discovers that Ling has been secretly involved with her boyfriend Wai (Andy Hui Chi-On), and this is the very reason why she was in the hotel when the crime was committed. Ling was released uncharged due to insufficient evidence as police believed Ching could be framing her for cheating with her boyfriend. Rather than quickly disappear, Ling starts stalking Ching, apparently jealous that Ching could have everything Ling wanted without an effort while Ling has to fight for it. Ching, at the beginning, sees that as a form of harassment, but soon twists it around and follows Ling instead. Ling seems accepting of this, showing her the darker side of life living as a poor girl compared to Ching's rich-girl background. The two engage in a subtle cat-and-mouse game, and Ching begins to fear for her life when Ling starts making threats to remove her kidney too.

One night, Ching is kidnapped by a mysterious man that seems to be an ally of Ling's. Here, Ching reveals that her kidney is weak, and the man will not be able to sell it for much. She passes out, and wakes to find Ling injured beside her. Ching takes her to the hospital, and it isn't long before Ching finds out that Ling is actually a kind person, more true then the friendships Ching shares with her superficial socialite friends. She learns that Ling has a childhood sweetheart, whose identity she does not reveal.

Ching and Ling then make a deal with the mysterious man so that Ching can get a kidney. However Ching informs the police beforehand, and when they arrive, the man holds Ling hostage. However, Ling supposedly kills the man. Wai begins to suspect Ling, and breaks into her house. Meanwhile, Ching invites Ling to her house where she learns that the man who was killed was none other than Ling's childhood sweetheart. Ling tells her that since she was in need of money for her mother, she and the man planned to make a living selling kidneys. However, because of Ching's 'betrayal', the man killed himself. Ling then discovers that Wai has been searching her house. She holds Wai hostage and asks Ching to come to her workplace, a research center, and give her kidney. Ching, armed with an axe chases Ling, her anger intensifying when she learns that Wai is dead. But Ling suffocates her with plastic.

In the end, Ching wakes up in hospital, where a doctor tells her that she was in critical condition, but saved by a kidney that belonged to the dead at the scene where she was found. She realizes that Ling hacked herself to death to give her the kidney she always wanted. Unable to digest this information, she starts screaming, begging the doctor to remove her kidney, as the camera cuts to a shot of Ching telling Ling they will always be together, and another of Ling lying dead with her voiceover saying, "You'll owe me this forever." There is a final shot of Ching, under the effect of sedatives, falling unconscious.

== Cast and roles include ==
- Karena Lam as Suen Ling
- Angelica Lee as Fung Chi Ching
- Andy Hui Chi-On as Wai
- Roy Chow as Chi Ming
- Liu Kai-chi as Lee Wah-Biu
- Annie Man as Ah-Shan
- Raymond Wong Ho-Yin as Ah-Keung
