= Nothing to Lose (2002 film) =

- Theatrical poster
- Directed by: Danny Pang
- Written by: Danny Pang
- Produced by: Titus Ho; Carrie Wong; Udom Piboonlapudom
- Starring: Arisara Wongchalee; Pierre Png; Yvonne Lim; Nimponth Chaisirikul
- Cinematography: Witcha Intranoi
- Edited by: Curran Pang
- Music by: Payont Permsith
- Distributed by: Film Bangkok
- Release date: 27 September 2002
- Running time: 94 minutes
- Country: Thailand
- Language: Thai

Nothing to Lose (Thai: 1+1 เป็นสูญ, or Neung buak neung pen soon, literally, 1+1=0) is a 2002 Thai crime-comedy-drama film written and directed by Danny Pang of the Pang Brothers. It is Danny Pang's solo directorial debut, and is part of the loose "Bangkok Trilogy" by the Pangs that also includes Bangkok Dangerous (1999) and One Take Only (2003).

== Plot ==
Somchai, a debt-ridden gambling addict, goes to the top of a building to commit suicide and finds a young woman, Go-go, standing on the ledge ready to do the same.

Rather than going through with the plans for death, the two talk and decide that there's nothing they can't do, since they had decided to die.

So they embark on a crime spree, starting out by eating in a restaurant and not paying the bill, then stealing a car and crashing it for fun.

They rob a convenience store, and are pursued by the police, and the gangsters Somchai pursue the couple as well.

== Cast ==
- Arisara Wongchalee as Gogo
- Pierre Png as Somchai
- Yvonne Lim as Daderufang
- Nimponth Chaisirikul

== Release ==
Nothing to Lose has been issued on DVD in Thailand, but despite what the package says, it has no English subtitles.

== Awards ==
The film won two awards at the Thailand National Film Association Awards: Best Actress for Arisara Wongchalee, and Best Costumes.
