= Chen Tzu-fu =

Taiwanese film poster artist (1926–2022)

Chen Tzu-fu (or Chen Zi-fu; Chinese: 陳子福; pinyin: Chén Zǐfú; October 1926 – 25 October 2022) was a Taiwanese artist known for his long career in painting film posters by hand, reportedly being Taiwan's most prolific film poster artist before the use of digital photo editing and mass printing.

== Biography ==
Chen was born in October 1926 on Taiwan during Japanese rule in Ximending, Taipei (then Seimon-chō, Taihoku in Japanese). He showed skill in drawing from a young age. He was sent to a naval school in Japan during World War II. However, when he was actually drafted into the imperial Japanese Navy at the age of 19, his ship was sunk on the way to Nagasaki; he was one of 88 survivors in the 303 recruits on board who arrived in the city. He returned to Taiwan in 1946 and got hired by the billboard advertising company White Day Studio, which he left after a month to join the film producer Cathay Organisation (Hong Kong) Limited. He was also offered an opportunity to join the Republic of China Navy as a lieutenant, which he denied.

In addition to his existing knowledge of art, he took the film poster painting position with his friends' help as it did not require much writing; due to his education in the Japanese system, he was not fluent in written Chinese. He redrew posters as they became damaged through their traversal of Taiwan alongside the film reels. He made his first original poster for a film that did not already have existing promotional material, which was credited with making the film commercially successful and kick-started his career in the 1950s as he left the company and became a freelancer in the wake of the issuance of the New Taiwan dollar reducing his salary.

Throughout his life, it is estimated that Chen painted 5,000 posters. He made posters for both Taiwanese and foreign films of a variety of genres during their release in the country, and was particularly known for his vivid colors and "bold, clear-cut, and direct" style. As he was unable to watch the films originally and did not want to imitate other promotional art, Chen applied significant artistic license and produced posters based on a cursory summary and stills of the actors' faces. In 1994, he made his last hand-drawn poster for the Taiwanese release of The House of the Spirits, but continued to make posters using photo editing tools. In 2006, he received a special award at the 43rd Golden Horse Awards. The Taiwan Film and Audiovisual Institute received 1,172 pieces from him in 2018 and 2019 for preservation. According to Chen, all of the posters he created are preserved in some form.

Chen died on 25 October 2022 at the age of 96.
