= After This Our Exile =

2006 Hong Kong film by Patrick Tam

- International poster
- Directed by: Patrick Tam
- Written by: Patrick Tam; Tian Koi-leong
- Produced by: Chiu Li-kuang; Eric Tsang; Yu Dong
- Starring: Aaron Kwok; Charlie Yeung; Gouw Ian Iskandar
- Cinematography: Pin Bing Lee
- Edited by: Patrick Tam
- Music by: Robert Ellis-Geiger
- Production companies: Vision Films; Polybona Films; Black & White Films
- Release date: 30 November 2006
- Running time: 121 minutes 160 minutes (director's cut)
- Country: Hong Kong
- Language: Cantonese

After This Our Exile (父子, literally Father-Son) is a 2006 Hong Kong drama film directed by Patrick Tam. A critical hit, the film won both the Hong Kong Film Award for Best Film and the Golden Horse Award for Best Feature Film awards, as well as netting Aaron Kwok his second consecutive win for the Golden Horse Award for Best Actor, after having won the award for his performance in Divergence the previous year.

== Plot ==
Chow Cheung-Sheng is in a dysfunctional relationship with his girlfriend Lee Yuk-Lin and their son Chow "Boy" Lok-Yun in Malaysia. Tired of the abuse, Lin repeatedly tries to leave the relationship. The three plan a cruise vacation, but on the day of departure, Lee seemingly falls ill and Sheng asks Lin to stay home for the trip. After Sheng and Boy return, they learn that Lin has left. Sheng speaks with Lin's friend Jennifer who denies knowledge of Lin's whereabouts but admits that Lin had been planning to leave and that she could be having an affair.

A scorned Sheng is fired from his restaurant job after losing his temper and is unable to pay his debts, including Boy's school bus fees, causing him to miss school. While at his classmate's house, Boy secretly steals a watch to give to Sheng; they move to a hotel in a different city to escape loan sharks. Sheng enters a sexual relationship with an escort Fong at the hotel he is staying at. Desperate for money, Sheng acts as a pimp for Fong to attract clients, but their relationship soon deteriorates as they argue over the money. Sheng gives the hotel manager the stolen watch in lieu of rent.

Meanwhile, Boy secretly returns to his old neighbourhood to look for Lin. He meets with Jennifer who reveals that she has contact with Lin. Boy reconnects with Lin, now remarried and pregnant with her new partner. Although Lin pleads with him to stay with her, Boy is angry at her abandonment and returns to Sheng. Outraged at Lin's affair, Sheng contemplates leaving to England, abandoning Boy with Lin, but is halted when his loan sharks track him down and beat him.

Unable to work due to his injuries, Sheng starts instructing Boy to burglarize houses, starting with the same classmate's house from which he stole the watch. While hiding inside a wealthy family's house, Boy is caught after he breaks down in tears while observing a pair of loving parents caring for their sick child. Sheng enters the house and convinces the family that his son was angry with him and fled into a random home. Angry at his failure to steal anything, Sheng abandons Boy. Alone, Sheng plots to steal a woman's purse before running into Boy again; he tells Boy that he will no longer force him to steal and will find a job. However, as they pass through a neighbourhood, he abruptly forces Boy into breaking into another house. Boy is caught by an angry homeowner, causing a scene in front of the entire neighbourhood.

Sheng is jailed; while visiting him, Boy bites Sheng's ear off in anger. A few years later, an adult Boy returns to the hotel and asks the manager to sell him back the stolen watch. Boy finds his former classmate's father and returns the watch to him. Boy returns to his old neighbourhood, seemingly spotting Sheng, and reminisces on his childhood.

== Cast ==
- Aaron Kwok as Chow Cheung-Sheng
- Charlie Yeung as Lee Yuk-Lin
- Gouw Ian Iskandar as Chow Lok-Yun
- Kelly Lin as Fong
- Qin Hailu as Ha Je
- Valen Hsu as Jennifer
- Lester Chan as Strong Man
- Lan Hsin-mei
- Allen Lin as Sick boy's father
- Qin Hao as School bus driver
- Chui Tien-you as Chow Lok-yun (young adult)
- Wang Yi-xuan as Sick boy's mother
- Xu Liwen as Rich boy's mother
- Faith Yang
- Mak Kwai-Yuen
- Mok Kam-Weng
- Daniel Yu

== Release ==
The movie runs for 121 minutes, but a 159 minutes long director's cut has been released in Hong Kong. The director's cut was also shown at the Asia Society in New York City on Friday, 20 July 2007, as a part of the Asian American International Film Festival.

== Awards and nominations ==
1st Rome Film Festival

- Competition Section

11th Busan International Film Festival

- Official Selection

Tokyo International Film Festival

- Best Artistic Contribution
- Best Asian Film

10th Toronto Reel Asian International Festival

- Opening Film

43rd Golden Horse Awards

- Won: Best Feature Film
- Won: Best Actor (Aaron Kwok)
- Won: Best Supporting Actor (Gouw Ian Iskandar)
- Nominated: Best New Performer
- Nominated: Best Original Screenplay
- Nominated: Best Cinematography
- Nominated: Best Makeup & Costume Design

26th Hong Kong Film Awards

- Won: Best Picture
- Won: Best Director (Patrick Tam)
- Won: Best Supporting Actor (Gouw Ian Iskandar)
- Won: Best Screenplay
- Won: Best New Performer (Gouw Ian Iskandar)
- Nominated: Best Actor (Aaron Kwok)
- Nominated: Best Supporting Actress (Kelly Lin)
- Nominated: Best Cinematography
- Nominated: Best Editing

== See also ==
- Astro Boy (film) - Best "Sequel" of the film

Awards
Preceded by Kung Fu Hustle	Golden Horse Awards for Best Film; 2006	Succeeded by Lust, Caution
Preceded by Election	Hong Kong Film Awards for Best Film; 2007	Succeeded by The Warlords
