= Stars Are Born =

1950s US television series

Stars Are Born is an early American television series which aired in New York City during 1951. A local series, it aired on DuMont Television Network's flagship station WABD, and like most WABD series was likely considered eligible to be picked up as a network series. It ran for several months, and aired in a 30-minute time-slot. It is not known if the series had a sponsor (surviving kinescopes of DuMont and WABD series suggest that, if it had a sponsor, the running time was about 24–25 minutes excluding commercials). It debuted February 4 and ran into May. The series featured dance numbers performed by children enrolled in various dancing schools in New York City. The program is likely lost, as most "local" shows of the 1950s are lost.

== Reception ==
Bob Lanigan for the Brooklyn Eagle newspaper said the program was "far from dull" and "had plenty of sparkle and imagination".
