= Re-cycle =

2006 Hong Kong-Thai film by the Pang brothers

- The Singaporean Re-cycle poster.
- Directed by: The Pang Brothers
- Written by: The Pang Brothers; Cub Chin; Sam Lung; Thomas Pang
- Produced by: Sa-Nga Chatchairungruang; Alvin Lam; Danny Pang Phat; Oxide Pang Chun
- Starring: Angelica Lee; Lawrence Chou; Siu-Ming Lau; Rain Li
- Cinematography: Decha Srimantra
- Edited by: Danny Pang Phat; Oxide Pang Chun; Curran Pang
- Music by: Payont Permsith
- Distributed by: Matching Motion Pictures; Universe Entertainment
- Release dates: 1 July 2006 (Hong Kong); 6 July 2006 (Singapore); 14 July 2006 (Taiwan)
- Running time: 108 minutes
- Countries: Hong Kong; Thailand
- Language: Cantonese
- Budget: 200 million baht
- Box office: $2,263,016

Re-cycle (Cantonese: 鬼域, Gwai wik) is a 2006 horror film directed by the Pang Brothers and starring Angelica Lee. The film was the closing film in the Un Certain Regard program at the 2006 Cannes Film Festival. It was also a reunion for the Pangs and the actress Lee, who starred in the Pangs' 2002 hit The Eye. It is a Hong Kong/Thai co-production.

== Plot ==
Ting-yin, a young novelist, is struggling to come up with a follow-up to her best-selling trilogy of romance novels. She has not even started on the book yet and her agent has already announced that the next title, The Recycle, will deal with the supernatural.

After drafting her first chapter, she stops and deletes the file from her computer. She then starts seeing strange, unexplainable things and finds that she is experiencing the supernatural events that she described in her novel-to-be.

== Cast ==
- Angelica Lee as Ting-yin/Chu Xun
- Lawrence Chou as Abby
- Siu-Ming Lau
- Rain Li
- Jetrin Wattanasin
- Cheang Pou-soi

== Controversy ==
Ting-yin finds herself in a parallel universe where abandoned things end up, including aborted fetuses, which combined with the portrayal of the main character's personal demons regarding her own aborted child leads some critics to believe the film carries an anti-abortion message. "That just happens to be one of the topics in the movie. We are not out to say if abortion is right or wrong", Oxide Pang said in one interview.
