= Ian Gouw =

Chinese-Canadian actor

Ian Iskandar Gouw
- Born: 9 April 1997 (age 29); Hong Kong
- Education: Hong Kong International School
- Occupation: Actor
- Years active: 2005–present

Ian Iskandar Gouw (traditional Chinese: 吳澋滔; simplified Chinese: 吴澋滔; pinyin: Wú Jǐngtāo; Cantonese Yale: Ng King-to, born 9 April 1997) is an actor, artist, and producer from Hong Kong.

== Career ==
At the age of eight, Gouw was cast as a lead role in the film Fu zi (also known as "After This Our Exile"), directed by Patrick Tam. Gouw modelled for DKNY Children's Clothing as well as for Disney Clothing in 2006. At age nine, Gouw went on to become the youngest actor ever to win and receive the Taipei Golden Horse Film Festival for Best Supporting Actor. Gouw also went on to become the youngest ever to win two Hong Kong Film Festival awards for his debut film Fu zi for Best New Performer, and Best Supporting actor respectively.

In the fall of 2009, Gouw also voiced the Cantonese version of Astro Boy.

== Personal life ==
Ian Gouw's mother is the late Hong Kong actress Michelle Sima and his father, Togi Gouw, is a Dutch businessman of Chinese Indonesian descent.

== Filmography ==
Year	Film	Role	Notes
2006	After This Our Exile	Lok Yun	
2009	Astro Boy	Astro Boy	Cantonese dubbing
2020	Septet: The Story of Hong Kong		segment: "Tender Is the Night"

== Awards ==
Awards
Golden Horse Award
- 2006 - Best Supporting Actor for After This Our Exile
Hong Kong Film Award
- 2007 - Best New Performer for After This Our Exile
- 2007 - Best Supporting Actor for After This Our Exile
Golden Bauhinia Awards
- 2007 - Best New Performer for After This Our Exile
- 2007 - Best Supporting Actor for After This Our Exile
