= A Star Is Born =

A Star Is Born may refer to:

== Film ==
- A Star Is Born (1937 film), starring Janet Gaynor and Fredric March, directed by William A. Wellman

=== Remakes ===
- A Star Is Born (1954 film), starring Judy Garland and James Mason, directed by George Cukor
- A Star Is Born (1976 film), starring Barbra Streisand and Kris Kristofferson, directed by Frank Pierson
- A Star Is Born (2018 film), starring Lady Gaga and Bradley Cooper, directed by Bradley Cooper

== Music ==
- A Star Is Born (1954 soundtrack), performed by Judy Garland
- A Star Is Born (1976 soundtrack), performed by Barbra Streisand and Kris Kristofferson
  - "Evergreen (Love Theme from A Star Is Born)", from the 1976 film; performed and co-written by Barbra Streisand
- A Star Is Born (2018 soundtrack), performed by Lady Gaga and Bradley Cooper
- "A Star Is Born" (Jay-Z song), 2009 song by Jay-Z
- "A Star Is Born", a song from the Hercules soundtrack

== Television ==
- "A Star Is Born (Canada's Drag Race)", a 2024 television episode
- Kokhav Nolad (Hebrew for A Star Is Born), Israeli television series
- Star Tanjō! (Japanese for A Star Is Born), Japanese television series
- "Stars Are Born", 1951 American television series first aired by DuMont Television Network's flagship station WABD
- "A Star Is Born", an episode of Leave it to Charlie
- A Star is Born, an episode of the PBS Kids animated series WordWorld

== See also ==
- "A Star Is Born Again", a 2003 episode of The Simpsons
- A Moon Star Is Born, an episode of Sailor Moon
- What Price Hollywood?, a 1932 film starring Constance Bennett and Lowell Sherman, directed by George Cukor; a possible (but not proven) basis for the films
- "Star Born", a 1957 novel by Andre Norton
- Gravitational collapse, the astronomical phenomenon for star formation
- "A Star Is Burns", a 1995 episode of The Simpsons
- Aashiqui 2, a 2013 Indian film adaptation of A Star Is Born films
- A Star is Hatched, a 1938 animated short that parodies the trope
