= Huo Siyan =

Chinese actress (born 1981)

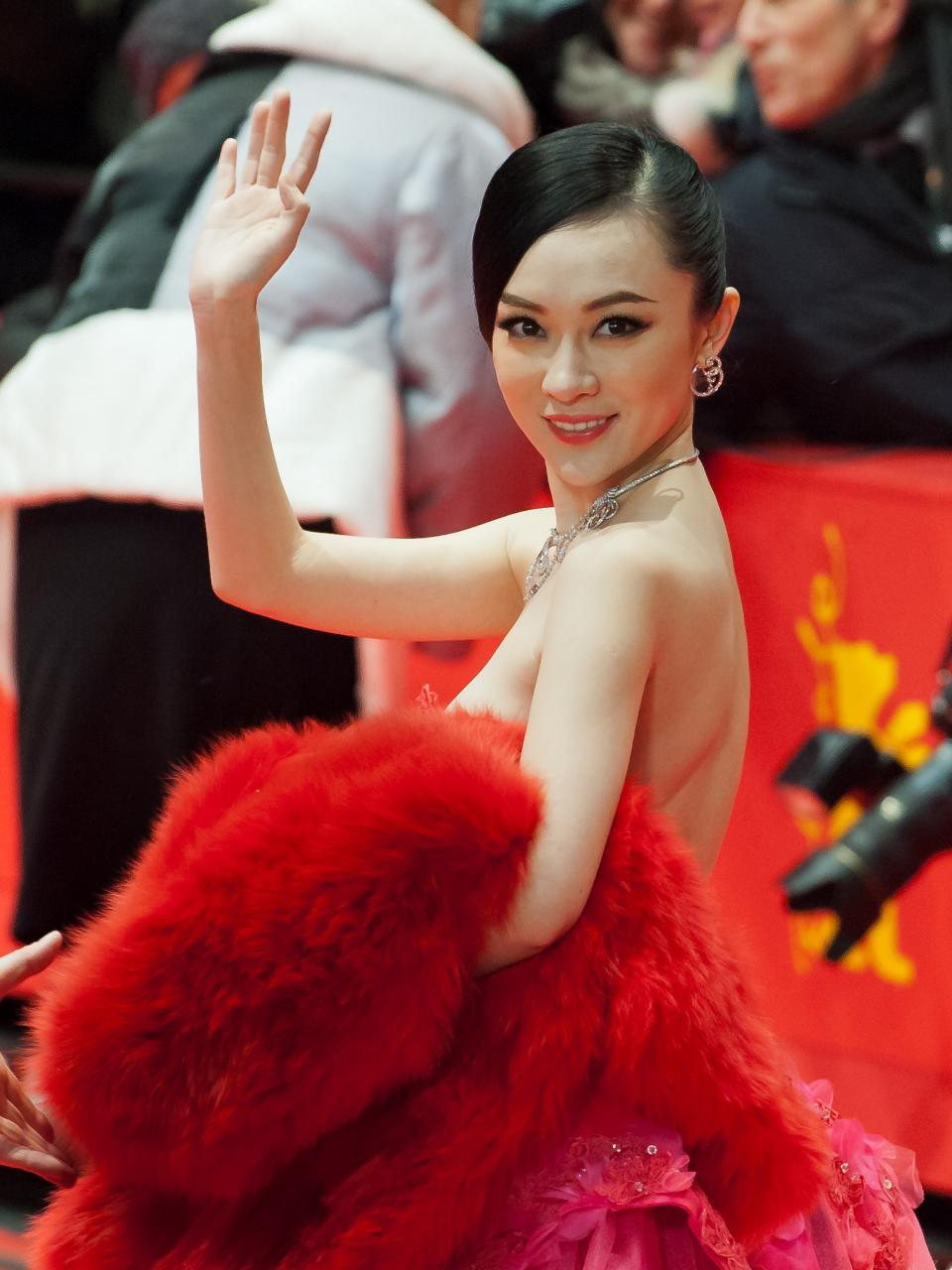
- Huo at the 62nd Berlin International Film Festival
- Born: October 23, 1981 (age 44); Beijing, China
- Other name: Huo Siyan (霍思彥)
- Occupations: Actress; singer
- Years active: 1998–present
- Spouse: Du Jiang (m. 2013)
- Children: 1

Chinese name
- Simplified Chinese: 霍思燕
Transcriptions
Standard Mandarin
- Hanyu Pinyin: Huò Sīyàn
Yue: Cantonese
- Jyutping: Fok3 Si1-jin3
- Musical career

Huo Siyan (born October 23, 1981) is a Chinese actress.

== Biography ==
Huo was born in a middle-class family in Beijing. Both her parents were university dons. She made her debut in an advertisement during 11th grade in school, and entered showbiz as she was invited to participate in a selection test for acting in a television series. After taking the college entrance examination, Huo chose to become a professional actress and started working on some television series. Her film debut was My Name Is Fame, in which she co-starred with Hong Kong actor Sean Lau.

== Filmography ==
=== Film ===
Year	English title	Chinese title	Role	Notes/Ref.
2006	My Name Is Fame	我要成名	Ng Hiu-fei	
2006	Heavenly Mission	天行者	Ngok Chung-wai	guest star
2008	Smiling Bracelet	微笑圈	Haixing	charity film
2010	Distant Thunder	迷城	Gan Xiu	alternative Chinese title Yuanlei (远雷)
2010	Legend of the Fist: The Return of Chen Zhen	精武风云·陈真	Weiwei	
2010	The Island	绝命岛		
2010	Adventure of the King	龙凤店	Princess Changci	
2010	The Player	大玩家	Yun	
2011	Sleepwalker	梦游3D	Ou Biyi	
2011	The Ultimate Winner	赢家	Huo Xiaoyan	
2011	Father	父亲	Huo Yanyan	
2012	Joyful Reunion	饮食男女2：好近又好远	Zhen'er	
2012	The Last Supper	王的盛宴	Concubine Qi	
2012	Double Xposure	二次曝光	Xiaoxi	
2013	Midnight Train	午夜火车	Yang Jie	
2016	The Wasted Times	罗曼蒂克消亡史	Prostitute	
2018	Operation Red Sea	红海行动		Cameo
2018	Kill Mobile	手机狂响	Li Nan	
2020	English	英格力士		

=== Television series ===
Year	English title	Chinese title	Role	Notes/Ref.
1998	The Happy Life of Talkative Zhang Damin	贫嘴张大民的幸福生活	Zhang Daxue	
1999		生死两周半	Zhou Yali	guest star
1999		京都神探	Ping'er	
1999		罪证	Luo Jianing	
1999		而立左右	Ye Xiao	
2000		九九归一	Zheng Xiu'er	
2000		屈原	Zhuang Die	
2000	Sword Master	三少爷的剑	Ji Qing	
2000	The Eloquent Ji Xiaolan	铁齿铜牙纪晓岚	Xiangcao	
2001	Chen Zhen	陈真后传	Princess	
2001	Affection	非常情网	Meng Fei	guest star
2001		星梦恋人	He Shanshan	
2001	Sun Zhong Shan	孙中山	Ou Xiaomei	guest star
2002		钱王	Wang Xiaomei	
2002		换个活法	Yi Xiaofan	
2002	Woman's Hotspring	女人汤	Gao Zi	
2003	The Young Emperor	少年天子	Consort Donggo	
2004	Happy 7 Fairies	欢天喜地七仙女	Zi'er	
2004	Strange Tales of Liaozhai	聊斋	Qiurong	
2004		六面埋伏	Xiaona	
2005		杨乃武与小白菜	Xiaobaicai	
2005	Jiaqing Emperor	嘉庆皇帝	Gua'er	
2005	Concubines of the Qing Emperor	大清后宫	Shen Yinqiu	
2005		像风一样离去	Qiao Kexin	
2006	Xi'an Incident	西安事变	Zhao Yihuo	
2006		江湖往事	Zhao Xiaoling	alternative Chinese title Dongfang Bazhu (东方霸主)
2007	The Last Princess	最后的格格	Yunxiang	
2007	Healing Souls	生命有明天	Sun Li	
2008	A Husband and Wife	夫妻一场	Ning Xiaoyan	
2008	Rose Martial World	玫瑰江湖	Jun Qiluo	
2009	Ghost Catcher Legendary Beauty	天师钟馗	Daji	
2009	Good Wife and Mother	贤妻良母	Mimi	guest star
2009		爱要有你才完美	Xu Mengfei	
2009		孽缘	Wang Hailing	
2010	Detective Tang Lang	唐琅探案	Su Yingying	
2010	The Brother Hero	兄弟英雄	Su Zhenyu	
2010	Windmill	风车	Shu Zhaoxin	
2012	The Girls	女人帮·妞儿	Meimei	guest star
2013	Protect Love Fearlessly	爱情面前谁怕谁	Yu Xiaoyu	
2014	Strawhat Police	草帽警察	Zhao Xiaojing	
2014	The Young Doctor	青年医生	Li Dan	guest star
2015	My Wife Is the Queen	我的媳妇是女王	Kai Xin	
2015	The Nanny Man	我爱男保姆	Tao Le	
2015	See You My Wife	再见，老婆大人	Zhen Meiren	
2016	Would You Marry Me	追婚记	Bai Shao	

== Awards and nominations ==
Year	Award	Category	Nominated work	Results	Ref.
2007	Hong Kong Film Directors' Guild Awards	Best New Performer (Silver)	My Name Is Fame	Won	
2007	26th Hong Kong Film Awards	Best New Performer	My Name Is Fame	Nominated	
2010	13th Shanghai International Film Festival	Best Actress	Distant Thunder	Nominated	
2011	24th Tokyo International Film Festival	Best Actress	Sleepwalker	Nominated	
