= Confession of Pain =

2006 Hong Kong film by Andrew Lau and Alan Mak

- Theatrical release poster

Chinese name
- Traditional Chinese: 傷城
- Simplified Chinese: 伤城
Transcriptions
Standard Mandarin
- Hanyu Pinyin: Shāng Chéng
Yue: Cantonese
- Jyutping: Seong1 Sing4
- Directed by: Andrew Lau; Alan Mak
- Written by: Felix Chong; Alan Mak
- Produced by: Andrew Lau; Cheung Hong-tat
- Starring: Tony Leung; Takeshi Kaneshiro; Shu Qi; Xu Jinglei
- Cinematography: Andrew Lau; Lai Yiu-fai
- Edited by: Azrael Chung
- Music by: Chan Kwong-wing
- Production companies: Media Asia Films; Sil-Metropole Organisation; Basic Pictures
- Distributed by: Media Asia Distribution
- Release date: 21 December 2006
- Running time: 110 minutes
- Country: Hong Kong
- Language: Cantonese
- Box office: US$14.2 million

Confession of Pain is a 2006 Hong Kong crime drama film directed by Andrew Lau and Alan Mak, starring Tony Leung, Takeshi Kaneshiro, Shu Qi and Xu Jinglei.

== Plot summary ==
Police inspectors Lau Ching-hei and Yau Kin-bong arrest a rapist in 2003. When Yau returns home later, he sees that his pregnant girlfriend has committed suicide by slitting her wrists. Yau is so depressed with her death that he indulges in alcohol and turns in his police badge to work as a private investigator. He becomes obsessed with finding out the reason for his girlfriend's suicide.

Three years later, Yau discovers that his girlfriend had actually cheated on him and she was waiting at a bar for her secret lover on the night she died. Her secret lover did not show up that night because he was involved in a car accident. Yau initially thought that he will be angry with his girlfriend's lover, but he ends up taking care of the comatose man in the hospital. Yau gets over the unhappy incident and falls in love with Hung, a girl who sells beer in the same bar.

Lau's wife, Susan, is the daughter of the billionaire Chow Yuen-sing. One night, Lau and two accomplices break into his father-in-law's residence, where they kill Chow and his butler, Uncle Man. Later, Lau lures his partners-in-crime to a rundown house and murders them, after which he attempts to make the scene seem as though the two of them killed each other in a dispute over the loot. Susan is not convinced that only the two killers were involved, so she hires Yau to help her investigate further. She has also become paranoid after her father's murder, so Lau has to discreetly give her pills to calm her down and put her to sleep.

After a long investigation, which includes a few dangerous confrontations with a "suspect", Yau discovers Lau's secret and dark past. Chow Yuen-sing, who was involved in drug trafficking, had murdered Lau's father, who was an officer in the anti-drug department, and all his other family members in Macau 25 years ago when Lau was still a child, and he bribed the police to close the case. Lau survived, took on a new identity, and grew up in an orphanage before moving to Hong Kong, where he became a police officer. Lau seeks vengeance on Chow and he pretended to fall in love with Susan and married her to get close to Chow. Lau wants to kill all Chow's family members just like Chow has done with his own family, so he attempts to kill Susan by drugging her and locking her inside the kitchen after turning on the gas. At the last moment, Lau is informed that Susan was not Chow's daughter but only a stepdaughter, which eliminates his reason to avenge her, but it is too late. Susan survives the explosion, but she is badly injured and ends up in hospital.

Lau visits Susan in hospital and mentally confesses the truth to her. She reveals that she already knows he tried to murder her because she was still partially conscious when he drugged her and locked her in the kitchen. She then asks him if he ever really loved her. Lau realises that, in his desire for revenge, he has destroyed a new family he created with Susan. Susan does not believe him, loses her will to live, and dies. Yau meets Lau outside the hospital and tells him his conclusion. Lau returns to Susan's room, where he feels overwhelmed by guilt and eventually commits suicide by shooting himself in the head.

== Cast ==
- Tony Leung as Lau Ching-hei
- Takeshi Kaneshiro as Yau Kin-bong
- Shu Qi as Hung
- Xu Jinglei as Susan Chow
- Chapman To as Tsui Wing-kwong
- Elliot Ngok as Chow Yuen-sing
- Emme Wong as Rachel
- Wan Yeung-ming as Uncle Man
- Wayne Lai as Chan Wai-keung
- Ricky Chan as Lai Sun-wah
- Ben Yuen as Wong Ming
- Cheung Kam-ching as Chan Wing-fu
- Rebecca Chan as Tsui Wing-kwong's mother
- Elena Kong as Chan Wing-fu's wife

== Soundtrack ==
Ayumi Hamasaki performed the theme song Secret, which appears in the international release of the film. The Mandarin theme song in the Chinese version, Secret of a Forlorn City (傷城秘密), was performed by Denise Ho.

== Distribution ==
Confession of Pain was released in Hong Kong theatres on 21 December 2006. The two-disc DVD edition, two-disc DVD special edition (with postcard book) and VCD edition were all released in Hong Kong on 14 February 2007. The DVD editions feature audio in DTS-ES and a second disc featuring a documentary of the making of the movie, photo galleries and other bonus features. The Japanese release rights went to Avex Trax, with the title "Kizudarake no Otokotachi" (傷だらけの男たち), which roughly translates as Heavily Scarred Men.

Sponsors of the film include: Giorgio Armani, Ayumi Hamasaki, 1010, San Miguel, Citicall, Philip Stein, D-Link, Neway and APM.

== Reception ==
=== Box office ===
Confession of Pain opened in Hong Kong in the same week as Zhang Yimou's Curse of the Golden Flower and was beaten on the opening day, but was still able to generate box office revenues of HK$3 million on its opening weekend.

=== Critical reception ===
Critical reception towards the film was mixed. Most critics positively reviewed the performances by Tony Leung and Takeshi Kaneshiro, but criticized the script as being weak or lacking suspense because it gives away too much too soon.

Andrew Chan of the Film Critics Circle of Australia writes, "Ultimately the film is too predictable to be a thriller, too few “Chapman To” to be a comedy and far too much Shu Qi to be not entirely annoying. With that being said, the most important element that this film lacks is the almost non-existent connection with the audience and the effect is leaving the audience muddled up and confused."

Screen Anarchy described the film as a visually polished crime drama marked by a pervasive tone of melancholy and strong performances by Tony Leung and Takeshi Kaneshiro. The review noted that while the film’s cinematography, musical score, and atmosphere were effective, its narrative revealed key elements too early, reducing suspense. Supporting characters were seen as underdeveloped, with several actors underutilized.

== Awards and nominations ==
The film was nominated for seven awards in the 26th Hong Kong Film Awards, including Best Screenplay, Best Actor, Best Cinematography, Best Film Editing, Best Art Direction, Best Costume and Make-Up Design, and Best Original Film Score. However, it only won one award for Best Cinematography.

Awards and nominations
Ceremony	Category	Recipient	Outcome
26th Hong Kong Film Awards	Best Screenplay	Alan Mak, Felix Chong	Nominated
26th Hong Kong Film Awards	Best Actor	Tony Leung	Nominated
26th Hong Kong Film Awards	Best Cinematography	Andrew Lau, Lai Yiu-fai	Won
26th Hong Kong Film Awards	Best Film Editing	Azrael Chung	Nominated
26th Hong Kong Film Awards	Best Original Film Score	Chan Kwong-wing	Nominated
26th Hong Kong Film Awards	Best Art Direction	Man Nim-chung	Nominated
26th Hong Kong Film Awards	Best Costume and Make Up Design	Man Nim-chung	Nominated
13th Hong Kong Film Critics Society Awards	Film of Merit	Confession of Pain	Won

== Remake ==
A Hollywood remake of Confession of Pain was announced by Warner Bros. who bought the rights of the film, with Leonardo DiCaprio's production company, Appian Way, set to produce the film alongside Roy Lee, who brokered the remake deals on Asian movies from The Ring to Infernal Affairs. However, it was not yet known if DiCaprio, who also starred in the Hollywood remake of Infernal Affairs (another Lau/Mak film), The Departed, will also star in the film. William Monahan, who won a Best Adapted Screenplay Oscar for The Departed, was set to work on the script. However since 2007, further developments in production or shooting have not been reported, hinting that the project may have now been slated.
