= 2 Become 1 (film) =

2006 Hong Kong film by Law Wing-cheong

- Promotional poster
- Hanyu Pinyin: 天生一對
- Directed by: Law Wing-Cheong
- Screenplay by: Fung Chi-Keung
- Story by: Ivy Ho
- Based on: Mourning for Breasts by Xi Xi
- Produced by: Johnnie To
- Starring: Miriam Yeung; Richie Ren; Justin Lo; Maggie Shiu
- Cinematography: Lai Yiu-Fai
- Edited by: Law Wing-Cheong
- Music by: Ben Cheung
- Production companies: Media Asia Films; Beijing Silver Dream; China Film Media Asia; Milkyway Image; China Film Co-Production Corporation
- Distributed by: Media Asia Distribution
- Release date: 28 June 2006
- Country: Hong Kong
- Languages: Cantonese; English
- Box office: $1,312,395

2 Become 1 (Chinese: 天生一對 Literal Title: Perfect Match) is a 2006 Hong Kong romantic comedy-drama film directed by Law Wing-Cheong and produced by Johnnie To. The film stars Miriam Yeung as Bingo Leung, a working-class woman who discovers she has breast cancer. The film is based on Xi Xi's published diary Mourning For Breasts (哀悼乳房), which chronicled her own experiences.

== Synopsis ==
Bingo Leung, an advertising executive, lives a carefree life with her friends until she bumps into a doctor, V, who becomes infatuated with her after she rejects him. His interference leads to her discovery of a malignant lump on her breast and a medical scam targeting her orchestrated by her long-lost boyfriend. Everything begins to fall apart as she tries to cope with the loss of femininity in a series of bittersweet events. With the help of V and a shy but talented teenage singer Sing, Bingo is able to cope with her cancer, revive her career and strengthen her bonds with her family. The epilogue shows Bingo years later at a shop buying a bra for her daughter.

== Cast ==
- Miriam Yeung as Bingo Leung
- Richie Ren as Dr Vincent 'V' Cheung
- Justin Lo as Fung Sing-Ping
- Maggie Shiu as Dr. Kong
- Hui Shiu-Hung as Mr. Hui
- Lam Suet as Police Officer
- Lam Ka-Tung as Hook
- Cheung Siu-Fai
- Guo Tao
- Jo Kuk
- Bonnie Wong
- Courtney Wu

== Production ==
The film is based on Xi Xi's diary Mourning For Breasts, which was based on her experiences with breast cancer. After Milkyway Image gained film rights, a first draft of the script was written by Ivy Ho, who relied on the diary's structured writings. After producers felt that the diary did not have a complete story, they hired screenwriter Fung Chi-Keung to rewrite the story.

== Marketing ==
The controversial teaser poster for 2 Become 1 was banned from Hong Kong's subway system.

2 Become 1 first gained controversy with the film's original theatrical poster, which showed a computer-altered photograph of a woman's upper torso. MTR, which runs Hong Kong's subway system, concluded that the poster was not suitable for the public and banned it from all subway stations, which were traditionally the most important locations for displaying movie posters in the city. The posters were replaced with a more traditional design, showing portraits of the leading actors. Miriam Yeung reacted strongly to the ban, and noted that there was no nudity in the film.

Reaction to the teaser poster differed in Mainland China. The Chinese Film Bureau, which is in charge of movie censorship, praised the design for its social value. The film's Mainland Chinese distributor, Polybona Films used the breasts design in various promotional materials.

== Reception ==
=== Awards and nominations ===
Hong Kong Film Awards

- Nominated: Best New Director (Law Wing-Cheong)
