= Elisha Walker =

American businessman and author (1879–1950)

Elisha Walker (October 8, 1879 – 1950) was an American businessman and writer. He was born in New York City. Isaac Walker was his father. He studied at Hotchkiss School, Yale and Massachusetts Institute of Technology.

He was an officer in a railroad. He was involved in a battle for control of Transamerica Corporation. He became a partner at Kuhn, Loeb & Co.

== Writings ==
- "A Design for a Shipyard" 1902, M. I. T. B.S. thesis
- "Concerning iron making, with special reference to the Buffalo and Susquehanna Iron Company" 1903
- "Industrial Mississippi, with Special Reference to the Gulf and Ship Island Railroad" 1904
