= Angelica Lee =

Malaysian-Chinese actress and singer

Sinje Lee
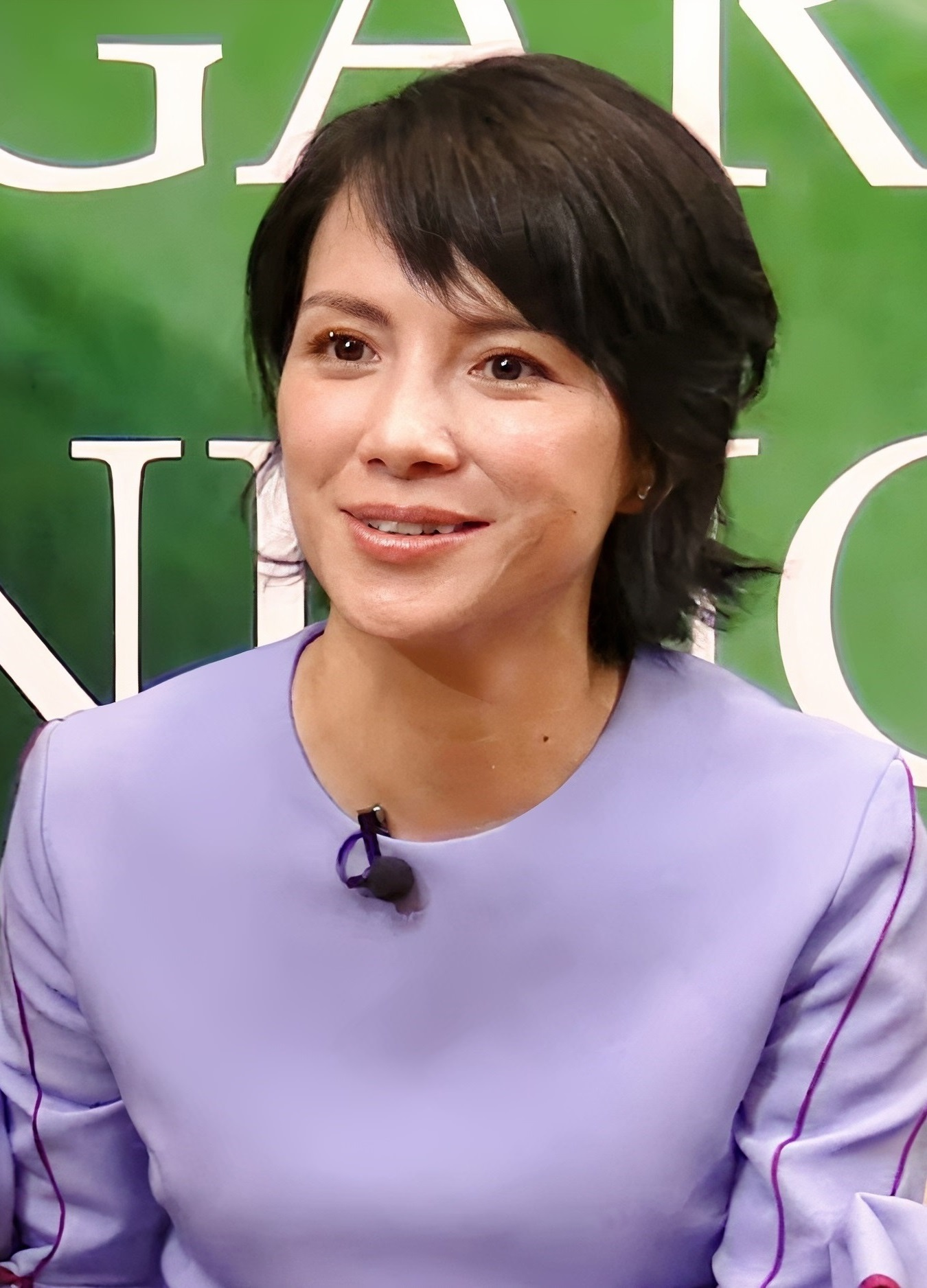
- Lee in 2018
- Born: 23 January 1976 (age 50); Alor Setar, Kedah, Malaysia
- Occupations: Actress, singer, director, producer
- Years active: 1995—present
- Spouse: Oxide Pang (m. 2010)
- Children: 2
- Awards: Berlin International Film Awards; New Talent Award; 2001 Betelnut Beauty; Hong Kong Film Awards – Best Actress; 2003 The Eye Golden Bauhinia Awards – Best Actress; 2003 The Eye Golden Horse Awards – Best Actress; 2002 The Eye

Chinese name
- Traditional Chinese: 李心潔
- Simplified Chinese: 李心洁
Transcriptions
Standard Mandarin
- Hanyu Pinyin: Lǐ Xīnjié
Southern Min
- Hokkien POJ: Lí Sim-kiat
- Musical career
- Also known as: Lee Sin Chet; Lee Sinje; Lee Sinjie
- Origin: Malaysia

Lee Sinje (Chinese: 李心潔; pinyin: Lǐ Xīnjié; Pe̍h-ōe-jī: Lí Sim-kiat; born 23 January 1976) is a Malaysian film actress and pop singer. She started her career in singing and later moved on to acting in Taiwan, Hong Kong and Malaysia. Lee starred in The Eye, the hit Asian horror film by the Pang Brothers, winning her the Golden Horse Award for Best Actress, Best Actress at the Hong Kong Film Awards and a Hong Kong Golden Bauhinia Awards. She is among the very few Asian artists to be awarded Best Newcomer Awards at the Berlin Film Festival in 2001 for her role in Betelnut Beauty.

Lee has also starred in the films 20 30 40 (where she co-starred with the person who discovered her, Sylvia Chang), and Koma. She worked with the Pangs again on Re-cycle, which was screened at the 2006 Cannes Film Festival. In 2025, she made her debut in a Chinese-language series on Netflix, The Resurrected .

Lee is also a visual artist. In her 20s, she began painting in Taiwan to cope emotionally with the loss of her grandmother. Since then, Lee has had several solo exhibitions in Taipei, including Hum, in 2011 at Tina Keng Gallery and Beyond Silence in 2023 at the Liang Gallery. Her first solo exhibition in Hong Kong was in December 2025, Childtopia at New Street Art Gallery.

== Early life ==
On 23 January 1976, Lee was born in Alor Setar, Kedah, Malaysia to a motorcycle shop owner and a homemaker. During her years in primary school, Lee was an active participant in singing competitions, where she won numerous awards, and in various sport-related activities. At Keat Hwa Secondary School, she was the head of her school's drama club. In 1995, at 19 years old, Lee was discovered by Sylvia Chang at a Kuala Lumpur film audition.

== Philanthropy ==
In 2006, Sinje and friends Charlie Yeung, Gigi Leung and Valen Hsu formed "Little Yellow Flower Education Foundation," a non-profit organization serving children in need.

== Personal life ==
She is married to Hong Kong born Thai director Oxide Pang. Together, the couple has twin boys, born on 8 July 2016.

== Filmography ==
Film
Year	English title	Original title	Role	Notes/Ref.
1999	The Sunshine Cops	陽光警察	Katy Lam	
2001	Betelnut Beauty	愛你愛我	Fei Fei	Best Newcomer, Berlin Film Festival Awards
2002	Princess D	想飛	Ling	
2002	The Eye	見鬼	Wong Kar-mun	Won Golden Horse Award for Best Leading Actress; Won Hong Kong Film Award for Best Actress; Won Golden Bauhinia Awards for Best Actress; Nominated Fangoria Chainsaw Awards for Best Actress; Won Chinese Film Media Awards for Best Actress (Hong Kong/Taiwan)
2003	Robinson's Crusoe	魯濱遜漂流記	Hsiao Fei	
2003	Golden Chicken 2	金雞2	Wife of Mr. Chan	
2004	20 30 40		Xiao Jie	Nominated Golden Horse Award for Best Supporting Actress
2004	Koma	救命	Fung Chi-ching	
2004	A-1 Headline	A-1頭條	Elaine Tse	
2005	Divergence	三岔口	Siu Fong / Amy	
2005	Love's Lone Flower	孤戀花	Wubao	
2006	Re-cycle	鬼域	Tsui Ting-yin	Nominated Golden Horse Award for Best Leading Actress; Nominated Hong Kong Film Award for Best Actress; Nominated Golden Bauhinia Awardsfor Best Actress
2007	Road to Dawn	夜。明	Xu Danrong	
2007	Mini	米尼	Mini	
2007	The Drummer	戰‧鼓	Hong Dou	
2008	Missing	深海尋人	Dr. Gao Jing	
2010	Ice Kacang Puppy Love * heroin: Ah niu	初戀紅豆冰	Fighting Fish	Best Actress, 1st Golden Wau Awards
2011	Sleepwalker	夢遊	Cheng Chi-yee	
2012	Melody	腳趾上的星光	Melody	
2012	The Thieves	도둑들	Julie	
2013	Out of Inferno	逃出生天	Si-lok	
2015	Murmur of the Hearts	念念	Yu-mei	Nominated Hong Kong Film Award for Best Supporting Actress; Nominated Hong Kong Film Critics Society Awards for Best Actress
2019	The Garden of Evening Mists	夕霧花園	Teoh Yun Ling (younger)	Movie adaptation of award-winning novel, The Garden of Evening Mists. Nominated Golden Horse Award for Best Leading Actress; Won; 31st Malaysia Film Festival for Best Actress
2023	Abang Adik			Also as producer

Television
Year	English title	Original title	Role	Notes/Ref.
2002	Never Ending Summer	沒完沒了的夏天	Mango	
2003	Si Shui Nian Hua	似水年華		
2005	Love's Lone Flower	孤戀花	Wubao	
2007	Big Shot	大人物	Tian Sisi	
2014	The Election	選戰	Yip Ching	
2025	The Resurrected	回魂計		Netflix

== Discography ==
- 1996: 同一個星空下
- 1998: Bye Bye 童年
- 1999: 第三代李心潔 裙擺搖搖
- 2000: 愛像大海
- 2003: Man & Woman
