= Diary (2006 film) =

2006 Hong Kong-Thai film by Oxide Pang

- The Hong Kong theatrical poster.
- Directed by: Oxide Pang
- Written by: Oxide Pang; Thomas Pang
- Produced by: The Pang Brothers
- Starring: Charlene Choi; Shawn Yue; Isabella Leong
- Cinematography: Anuchit Chotrattanasiri
- Edited by: Curran Pang
- Music by: Payont Permsith
- Distributed by: Universe Films; Image Entertainment
- Release date: 26 October 2006 (Hong Kong)
- Running time: 85 minutes
- Countries: Hong Kong; Thailand
- Language: Cantonese
- Box office: $749,981

Diary (also known as Mon seung) is a 2006 thriller film directed by Oxide Pang.

== Synopsis ==
Winnie Leung (Charlene Choi), a dour loner of a young woman, spends her days in her apartment, cooking meals, carving wooden dolls and waiting for her boyfriend, Seth Lau (Shawn Yue) to come home. One day, she records in her diary, "Today Seth left, without a sound."

She then ventures outside and sees a man named Ray (also Shawn Yue), and invites him back to her apartment for a meal. She says that her ex-boyfriend, Seth, died in a car accident and asks him to stay with her. Ray took pity and ended up living with her. But in spite of this, Winnie was in the habit of mentioning Seth every time much to Ray's annoyance. She even goes as far as comparing Seth's police academy failure when Ray showed intention.

A scene on the market shows us Winnie having a hard time dealing with short-term memory. She went in a petty argument with a fish vendor claiming to have given a 500 bill even though she hasn't. She left feeling cheated, only to come back to the same vendor and later on realizing she already has bought fish. Coming back to their house, Ray is found sitting on the sofa. Winnie tried to start a conversation with him only to be met with coldness like as if she isn't there.

Dinner came. She resumed engaging in small talk until Ray started to accuse her of lying. Their voices started to rise, agitating Winnie that to prove her point, she procured her diary facing open to Ray's face. Her confidence on the truth she knows was met with skepticism when she saw the fear in Ray's eyes. She read the entry herself and was equally shocked at what she wrote. She tried to calm herself by resuming her meal and encouraging Ray to do the same. Winnie promised that they leave as soon as they finish their meal but Ray went limp, not attempting to do as told. This act made her go into another episode of rage. She started shoving food on his face onto which he didn't attempt to fight. The reality she knows started to fade and melt in with what is currently happening, revealing the instances on how she have lured Ray and detaining him. Eventually, Winnie's instability made her kill Ray assuming that he's having an affair with a lady voice over the phone.

Later on Winnie's neighbors began to smell something foul coming from her apartment. She was reported to the police for questioning. Winnie cited an Yvonne Ho being the mastermind. When the police came for Yvonne we are then showed the exact faces of Winnie and Ray. Apparently, the psychotic Winnie assumes the personality of her former classmate and her ex-boyfriend, now husband of Yvonne. Winnie resumes her fantasy, claiming how the reporter on the TV sends her personal messages through his reporting.

== Cast ==
- Charlene Choi as Winnie / Yee
- Shawn Yue as Seth/Ray
- Isabella Leong as Yee / Winnie
