= The Eye (2002 film) =

2002 Hong Kong-Singaporean film by the Pang brothers

- Hong Kong theatrical release poster
- 見鬼
- Directed by: Pang brothers
- Written by: Jojo Hui; Pang brothers
- Produced by: Peter Chan; Lawrence Cheng
- Starring: Angelica Lee; Lawrence Chou; Chutcha Rujinanon
- Cinematography: Decha Srimantra
- Edited by: Pang brothers
- Music by: Orange Music
- Production company: Applause Pictures
- Distributed by: Mediacorp Raintree Pictures
- Release dates: 9 May 2002 (Hong Kong); 27 June 2002 (Singapore)
- Running time: 95 minutes
- Countries: Hong Kong; Singapore
- Languages: Cantonese; Mandarin; Thai
- Budget: S$4,500,000
- Box office: HK$13,733,856

The Eye (見鬼), also known as Seeing Ghosts, is a 2002 Hong Kong–Singaporean supernatural horror film directed by the Pang brothers. The film spawned two sequels by the Pang brothers, The Eye 2 and The Eye 10. There are three remakes of this film, including Adhu, made in 2004 in Tamil, Naina made in 2005 in Hindi and The Eye, a 2008 Hollywood production starring Jessica Alba.

== Synopsis ==
Blind since the age of 5, 20-year-old classical violinist Wong Kar-mun undergoes an eye cornea transplant after receiving a pair of new eyes from a donor. Initially, she is glad to have her sight restored but becomes troubled when she starts seeing mysterious figures that seem to foretell gruesome deaths. The night before her discharge from the hospital, she sees a shadowy figure accompanying a patient out of the room, and the next morning, the patient is pronounced dead.

Kar-mun goes to see Dr. Wah, a psychotherapist, about the strange entities that she has been seeing. He is initially sceptical, but as he gradually develops a closer relationship with her, he decides to accompany her to northern Thailand to find Ling, the eye donor. When they ask a village doctor about Ling and her family, he is unwilling to reveal anything but becomes more cooperative when Kar-mun tells him that she sees what Ling used to see. Ling had a psychic ability that allowed her to foresee death and disaster. However, her fellow villagers misunderstood her as a jinx and refused to trust her. Once, Ling tried to warn the people about an imminent disaster, but they drove her away in disbelief. When her vision came true, she felt guilty about the tragedy and hanged herself. Ling's mother is both depressed and angry with her daughter and has never forgiven Ling for committing suicide until one night, Ling's spirit possesses Kar-mun and attempts suicide. Ling's mother saves Kar-mun and breaks down, saying she has forgiven Ling, and Ling's spirit leaves in peace.

On the return journey, their bus is caught in a traffic jam, and Kar-mun sees hundreds of ghostly figures lumbering on the road. Believing that a catastrophe is approaching, she runs out of the bus and tries to warn everyone to leave, but no one understands her and thinks she is insane. The traffic jam is due to a tank truck that has toppled over and is blocking the road. The truck starts leaking natural gas, but nobody notices it. A driver restarts his engine and ignites the gas, causing a chain explosion. Dr. Wah saves Kar-mun from death by shielding her with his body, but Kar-mun is already blinded by glass fragments. In the epilogue, a blind Kar-mun is seen roaming the streets of Hong Kong. Although she has lost her sense of sight again, she is happy that she now has the support and friendship of Dr. Wah.

== Cast ==
- Angelica Lee as Wong Kar-mun
  - Cusnithorn Chotiphan as Wong Kar-mun (younger)
- Lawrence Chou as Dr. Wah
- Chutcha Rujinanon as Ling
  - Tassanana Nuntasaree as Ling (4 years old)
  - Damronowiseeatpanich as Ling (8 years old)
- So Yat-lai as Yingying
- Candy Lo as Wong Kar-yee
  - Dampcingcingtrakulsawadee as Wong Kar-yee (younger)
- Ko Yin-ping as Wong Kar-mun's grandmother
- Pierre Png as Dr. Eak
- Edmund Chen as Dr. Lo

== Production ==
The Eye is a co-production between Singapore's MediaCorp Raintree Pictures and Hong Kong's Applause Pictures, and was shot in Hong Kong and Thailand with a pan-Asian cast and crew, including Malaysian actress Angelica Lee, Chinese-Canadian singer Lawrence Chou, Singaporean actor Pierre Png and Thai actress Chutcha Rujinanon. The crew included Thai cinematographer Decha Seementa, and the Thai music collective Orange Music provided the score.

Danny and Oxide Pang said they were inspired to write the screenplay for The Eye by a report they had seen in a Hong Kong newspaper 13 years before, about a 16-year-old girl who had received a corneal transplant and committed suicide soon after.

Oxide Pang said in an interview: "We'd always wondered what the girl saw when she regained her eyesight finally and what actually made her want to end her life".

At the end, the scene with the accident, is based on the 1990 Bangkok gas explosion on New Petchburi Road. It killed 88 people, injured 36 people, destroyed 67 cars, and caused 215 million baht in damage.

== Release ==
The Eye was released in Hong Kong on 9 May 2002 and in Singapore on 27 June. In the Philippines, the film was released on 5 February 2003.

=== Critical reception ===
The review aggregation website Rotten Tomatoes offers an approval rating of 64% based on 104 reviews, with an average rating of 6.1/10. The site's critical consensus reads: "Conventional ghost tale with a few genuine scares". The film has a score of 66 out of 100 on Metacritic based on 26 critics, indicating "generally favorable reviews".

=== Box office ===
The film was released in the United States and Canada in 13 cinemas on 6 June 2003, grossing $122,590 its opening weekend. In those countries, the film's widest release was 23 theatres and it eventually grossed a total $512,049.

== See also ==
- List of ghost films
- Adhu
- Kokila, a 1990 Telugu movie with similar plot
