= Isabella Leong =

Macanese actress (born 1988)

- 梁洛施
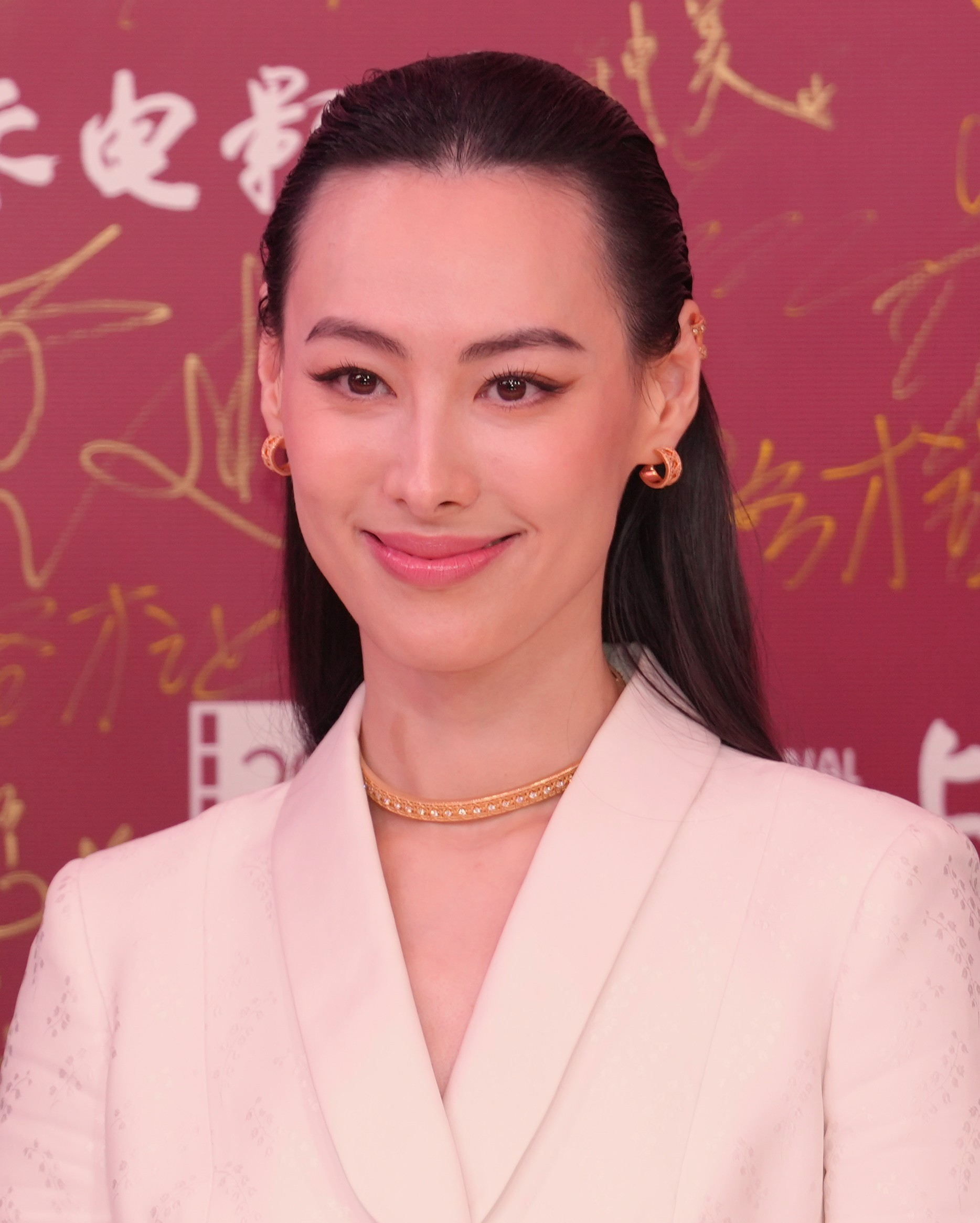
- Leong at 2026 Shanghai International Film Festival
- Born: Leong Lok-yiu (梁樂瑤); Luisa Isabella Nolasco da Silva; 23 June 1988 (age 38); Macau
- Partner: Richard Li (2008–2011)
- Children: 3
- Parent: Luís Nolasco da Silva
- Awards: Golden Bauhinia Awards – Best New Performer; 2006 Isabella

Chinese name
Transcriptions
Standard Mandarin
- Hanyu Pinyin: Liáng Luòshī
Yue: Cantonese
- Jyutping: Loeng4 Lok3-si1
- Musical career
- Also known as: Isabella Leong; Isabella Leung; Luisa Isabella Leung; Leung Lok-si
- Origin: Hong Kong
- Genre: Cantopop
- Instruments: Vocals; Piano; Guitar; Erhu; Flute

Luísa Isabella Nolasco da Silva or Leong Lok-yau (born 23 June 1988), better known as Isabella Leong, is a Macanese actress and former singer.

== Early life ==
Luísa Isabella Nolasco da Silva was born on 23 June 1988 to Luís Alberto Marques Nolasco da Silva (b. Sé, 8 August 1951; d. São Lourenço, 20 January 1989) and a croupier. She has a sister who is seven years older.

Leong's father was a descendant of one of the most prominent and long-established Macanese families, the Nolasco da Silva. Her father was a Eurasian born to Frederico João Moreira de Sousa Teles de Menezes, a Portuguese father and Terry Marques Nolasco, a Chinese woman living in Portugal. Frederico Joao is the sixth generation of the family and former President of the Macau Football Association. Leong's father has two elder brothers, Henrique and Frederico and one younger brother, Jose Manuel.

Leong's father had a secret drug addiction and died from an overdose when she was six months old. She had never received recognition from her paternal family, so she took her mother's surname. Leong's mother worked as a croupier in Casino Lisboa and Leong was responsible for contributing to the family's finances.

In 1993, she moved from Macau to Hong Kong and enrolled in Po Leung Kuk Camões Tan Siu Lin Primary School, after which she went to several schools in Hong Kong and Macao. She attended Macau Sam Yuk Middle School in 1999 but dropped out.

== Career ==
To help provide for her family, Leong abandoned school at age 12 to become a model for Emperor Entertainment Group.

She later began singing and released her debut album, Isabella, when she was 16 years old. Isabella did not achieve the success hoped for and Leong subsequently debuted with acting. From 2005 to 2007, she made a string of films including The Eye 10, Bug Me Not!, Isabella, Diary, and Spider Lilies.

Leong won her first American film role in The Mummy: Tomb of the Dragon Emperor, which was released in 2008.

=== EEG contract dispute ===
Emperor Entertainment Group filed a lawsuit in the High Court on 3 April 2008, to seek damages from Leong for breaking a 10-year contract which Leong's mother signed for her when she was only 12 years old. Leong filed a writ against the company on 27 April. In November 2008, the legal battle between Leong and EEG ended in an out-of-court settlement, with the star "free to pursue her career".

== Personal life ==
In 2008, Leong met Hong Kong businessman Richard Li, son of billionaire Li Ka-shing, on a movie set, when she was 20 and he was 41. In April 2009, Leong gave birth to their first son Ethan Li Cheung Tsz. For this, Leong was allowed to use Li's family mansions in San Francisco. They also provided her with an entourage of caregivers, including five bodyguards, four full-time nannies and a personal attendant.

In June 2010, Leong gave birth to Li's twin sons in San Francisco.

In March 2011, Leong announced that she and Li had ended their relationship. They both declared that the split was amicable and that they would both take care of their children.

== Discography ==
Album #	Album information
1st	Isabella – First Album Versions A, B, C: Release Date : 3 September 2004; Language : Cantonese; Package Weight: 300 g; Publisher : Emperor Entertainment Group (HK)
2nd	I am Isabella (EP): Release Date : 8 July 2005; Language : Cantonese; Package Weight: 260 g; Publisher : Emperor Entertainment Group (HK)
3rd	To Find Love (EP): Release Date : 8 July 2005; Language : Cantonese; Package Weight: 210 g; Publisher : Emperor Entertainment Group (HK)
4th	I am Isabella (Complete Version): Release Date : 16 September 2005; Language : Cantonese; Subtitle : Traditional Chinese; Package Weight: 380 g; Publisher : Emperor Entertainment Group (HK); Other Information: CD + VCD
5th	Say Goodbye... Luisa (DualDisc) (CD+DVD): Release Date : 15 August 2006; Language : Cantonese; Subtitle : Traditional Chinese; Package Weight: 210 g; Publisher : Emperor Entertainment Group (HK)

== Publication ==
Product
Isabella Photo Album
- Format : 80 Pages
- Language : Traditional Chinese
- Publisher : Megalink International Communications Ltd ISBN 988-98130-6-8
- Release Date : 12 August 2005
EEG Artiste Crystal – Isabella
- Release Date : 29 May 2006
- Package Weight: 510 g
- Publisher : Emperor Entertainment Group Showroom (HK)
Post Card – Isabella
- Release Date : 5 May 2005
- Package Weight: 20 g
- Publisher : Emperor Entertainment Group (HK)
Isabella Artiste Profile
- Release Date : 6 May 2005
- Package Weight: 20 g
- Publisher : Emperor Entertainment Group (HK)

== Filmography ==
Year	Title	Role
2004	Sunshine Heartbeat 赤沙印记@四叶草2	Girl asking for fortune
2005	The Eye 10 見鬼 10	April
2005	Bug Me Not! 虫不知	Moon (小月)
2005	Dragon Squad 猛龍	Kong's daughter (江綽芝)
2005	A Chinese Tall Story 情癲大聖	Red Child (紅孩兒)
2006	McDull, the Alumni 春田花花同學會	Wing Yan (詠思)
2006	Isabella 伊莎貝拉	Cheung Bik-Yan (張碧欣)
2006	Dragon Tiger Gate 龍虎門	voice
2006	Diary 妄想	Leung Wing Na/Ho Lai Yee (梁詠娜/何麗儀)
2006	The Knot 云水谣	Wang Xiao-rui (王曉芮)
2007	Simply Actors 戲王之王	Guest
2007	Spider Lilies 刺青	Takeko (竹子)
2008	Missing 深海尋人	Chen Xiao-Kai (陳小凱)
2008	The Mummy: Tomb of the Dragon Emperor	Lin (小林)
2015	12 Golden Ducks	CEO woman (cameo)
2015	Murmur of the Hearts	Yu-mei
2019	Missbehavior	Boss
2020	Love After Love	Ji Jie
2023	Bursting Point 爆裂點	Ying Xiu (膺秀)

== Awards ==
Fantasporto (2006)

- Best Actress for Isabella

Golden Bauhinia Awards (2006)

- Best New Performer for Isabella

=== Nominations ===
Hong Kong Film Awards (2005)

- Best New Performer for Bug Me Not

Hong Kong Film Awards (2007)

- Best Actress for Isabella

Hong Kong Film Awards (2007)

- Best Supporting Actress for Diary

Golden Bauhinia Awards (2007)

- Best Supporting Actress for Diary
