= Danny Pang Phat =

Film director and editor from Hong Kong; one of the Pang brothers

- Born: 11 November 1965 (age 60); British Hong Kong
- Occupations: Film director; film editor
- Relatives: Oxide Pang Chun (brother)

Danny Pang Phat (born 1965) is one of the Pang brothers. The twin brothers Oxide and Danny Pang started their career in Hong Kong, where Oxide worked as colourist and Danny as editor. After moving to Bangkok, Oxide made Who Is Running? which was edited by Danny. Bangkok Dangerous is the first film in which the brothers combine their talents.

== Career ==
Pang started his career as an editor working on numerous Hong Kong films such as The Storm Riders and the Infernal Affairs series, he also wrote and directed Neung Buak Neung Pen Soon (also known as 1+1=0 or Nothing To Lose), which was released in 2002. He also directed the Chinese horror thriller The Strange House.

== Filmography ==
- Neung Buak Neung Pen Soon (2002)
- The Strange House (2015) as director
- The Mirror (2015) as director
- Blind Spot (2015) as director
- Delusion (2016) as director
