= List of Taiwanese films of the 2000s =

This is a list of films produced in Taiwan ordered by year of release. For an alphabetical list of Taiwanese films see Category:Taiwanese films

== 2000 ==
Title	Director	Cast	Genre	Notes
Crouching Tiger, Hidden Dragon	Ang Lee	Chow Yun-fat, Michelle Yeoh, Zhang Ziyi, Chang Chen	martial arts	Academy Award for Best Foreign Language Film
Legend of the Sacred Stone	Chris Huang		Glove puppetry action	
Yi Yi	Edward Yang	Wu Nien-jen, Elaine Jin	drama	Taiwan-China-Japan co-production; Won the Best Director award at the 2000 Cannes Film Festival Copyright notice: 1999.
The Cabbie	Yiwen Chen, Huakun Zhang	Chung-heng Chu, Rie Miyazawa, Leon Dai	comedy	

== 2001 ==
Title	Director	Cast	Genre	Notes
Millennium Mambo	Hou Hsiao-hsien	Shu Qi, Jack Kao	drama	Entered into the 2001 Cannes Film Festival
What Time Is It There?	Tsai Ming-liang	Lee Kang-sheng, Chen Shiang-chyi	drama	Entered into the 2001 Cannes Film Festival
Betelnut Beauty	Lin Cheng-sheng	Chang Chen, Angelica Lee	drama/romance	Won the Silver Bear for Best Director at the 2001 Berlin International Film Festival
The Best of Times	Chang Tso-chi	Wing Fan	drama	Entered into the 2002 Venice Film Festival

== 2002 ==
Title	Director	Cast	Genre	Notes
Double Vision	Chen Kuo-fu	Tony Leung Ka-Fai, David Morse, Rene Liu, Leon Dai	horror/suspense	Screened at the 2002 Cannes Film Festival
Blue Gate Crossing	Yee Chin-yen	Wilson Chen, Gwei Lun-mei	drama	
The Skywalk Is Gone	Tsai Ming-liang	Lee Kang-sheng, Chen Shiang-chyi, Lu Yi-ching	drama	Short film

== 2003 ==
Title	Director	Cast	Genre	Notes
Goodbye, Dragon Inn	Tsai Ming-liang	Lee Kang-sheng, Chen Shiang-chyi	drama	

== 2004 ==
Title	Director	Cast	Genre	Notes
Formula 17	Chen Yin-jung	Tony Yang, Duncan Lai	comedy	
20 30 40	Sylvia Chang	Angelica Lee, Rene Liu, Sylvia Chang	comedy	Entered into the Berlin Film Festival
Love of May	Hsu Hsiao-ming	Wilson Chen, Liu Yifei	romance	

== 2005 ==
Title	Director	Cast	Genre	Notes
Dragon Eye Congee	Chang Kuo-fu	Fann Wong, Shaun Tam	romance	
Fall... in Love	Ming-Tai Wang	Lan Cheng-lung, Kang-i Lee, Fang Wan, Kuei-Ying Hsu, Jack Kao	romance	Entered into the 62nd Venice International Film Festival
One Stone and Two Birds	Kevin Chu	Jacky Wu, Ruby Lin, Eric Tsang	comedy	
Three Times	Hou Hsiao-hsien	Shu Qi, Chang Chen	romance	Entered into the 2005 Cannes Film Festival
The Wayward Cloud	Tsai Ming-liang	Lee Kang-sheng, Chen Shiang-chyi	drama/musical	Won the Sliver Bear, Alfred Bauer Award and FIPRESCI Prize at the Berlin International Film Festival
The Strait Story	Huang Yu-shan	Freddy Lim, Vivian Hsu, Janine Chang, How-Jie Ho, Hong-Shiang Lin, Tsai-Yi Huang	drama	
The Heirloom	Leste Chen	Terri Kwan	horror	

== 2006 ==
Title	Director	Cast	Genre	Notes
Eternal Summer	Leste Chen	Joseph Chang, Bryant Chang	drama	
My Football Summer	Yang Li-Chou, Chang Rong-ji		documentary	
Silk	Su Chao-Bin	Chang Chen, Yōsuke Eguchi, Karena Lam, Wilson Chen, Janine Chang, Barbie Shu	horror/suspense	Screened at the 2006 Cannes Film Festival

== 2007 ==
Title	Director	Cast	Genre	Notes
The Most Distant Course	Lin Jing-jie	Gwei Lun-mei, Mo Tz-yi, Jia Siao-guo	drama	
Spider Lilies	Zero Chou	Rainie Yang, Isabella Leong	drama	Won the Teddy Award for Best feature film at the Berlin International Film Festival
Secret	Jay Chou	Jay Chou, Gwei Lun-mei, Anthony Wong	romance	
Summer's Tail	Cheng Wen-tang	Bryant Chang, Dean Fujioka, Enno, Hannah Lin	drama	
Island Etude	Chen Hwai-en	Easton Dong, Wu Nien-jen	drama	
What on Earth Have I Done Wrong?!	Doze Niu	Doze Niu, Janine Chang	drama	
The Drummer	Kenneth Bi	Jaycee Chan, Tony Leung Ka Fai, Angelica Lee	drama	With Hong Kong production, entered into the 2007 Sundance Film Festival
Help Me Eros	Lee Kang-sheng	Lee Kang-sheng	drama	Executive produced by Tsai Ming-liang, entered into the 2007 Venice Film Festival
Lust, Caution	Ang Lee	Tony Leung Chiu-Wai, Tang Wei, Leehom Wang, Joan Chen, Tou Chung-hua, Lawrence Ko	drama	Won the Golden Lion award at the 2007 Venice Film Festival
The Song of Cha-tian Mountain	Huang Yu-shan	-------	Drama	

== 2008 ==
Title	Director	Cast	Genre	Notes
Kung Fu Dunk	Kevin Chu	Jay Chou	comedy	
Winds of September	Tom Lin Shu-yu	Rhydian Vaughan	drama	
Cape No. 7	Wei Te-sheng	Van Fan, Tanaka Chie, Kousuke Atari	drama/comedy	The 2nd top-grossing film in the Taiwanese cinematic history
Candy Rain	Chen Hung-I	Karena Lam, Cyndi Wang	drama	
Beautiful Crazy	Chi Y. Lee	Amiya Lee, Chien-hui Liao, Angel Yao		
Good Will Evil	Lin Yu-Fen, Wang Ming-Chan	Terri Kwan, Tammy Chen, Leon Dai, Lu Yi-Ching, Cindy Chi and Chen Wen-Cheng	horror	
Blue Brave: The Legend of Formosa in 1895	Hong Zhiyu	Cheryl Yang, James Wen, Lee Chia-yin	drama/historical fiction	First Hakka feature-length film ever made
Parking	Chung Mong-hong	Chang Chen, Leon Dai, Gwei Lun-mei, Jack Kao, Tou Chung-hua	drama/comedy	Screened at the 2008 Cannes Film Festival

== 2009 ==
Title	Director	Cast	Genre	Notes
Invitation Only	Kevin Ko	Bryant Chang, Maria Ozawa	horror	
Face	Tsai Ming-liang	Mathieu Amalric, Jeanne Moreau, Lee Kang-sheng	drama	Entered into the 2009 Cannes Film Festival
No Puedo Vivir Sin Ti	Leon Dai	Akira Chen	drama	Won the Best Film and Best Director at Golden Horse Awards
Miss Kicki	Håkon Liu	Pernilla August, Huang He	drama	With Sweden production
Hear Me	Zheng Fen Fen	Eddie Peng, Chen Yi Han	drama	
Prince of Tears	Yonfan	Joseph Chang, Wing Fan, Terri Kwan	drama	Entered into the 2009 Venice Film Festival
Somewhere I Have Never Traveled	Fu Tian-yu	Lin Bo-hong, Yu Shin, Li Yun-yun	drama	
The Treasure Hunter	Kevin Chu	Jay Chou, Lin Chi-ling, Eric Tsang, Chen Daoming	Action/Adventure	
South(ern) Night	Huang Yu-shan	-------	Drama	
