= List of Taiwanese actresses =

The following is a list of notable actresses from Taiwan

== A ==
- Ady An

== B ==
- Bai Bai
- Bianca Bai

== C ==
- Chan Tzu-hsuan
- Angela Chang
- Chang Hsiao-yen
- Janine Chang
- Sylvia Chang
- Winnie Chang
- Joyce Chao
- Annie Chen
- Buffy Chen
- Ella Chen
- Michelle Chen
- Chen Shiang-chyi
- Chen Shu-fang
- Ivy Chen
- Joe Chen
- Sally Chen
- Vicky Chen (文淇)
- Vicky Chen (陳孝萱)
- Chen Yu
- Lyan Cheng
- Alyssa Chia
- May Chin
- Amanda Chou
- Amanda Chu
- Chung Hsin-ling
- Genie Chuo

== D ==
- Ding Ning

== F ==
- Mavis Fan
- Beatrice Fang
- Caitlin Fang
- Fang Wen-lin
- Abby Fung

== G ==
- Gua Ah-leh
- Gwei Lun-mei

== H ==
- Elva Hsiao
- Hsieh Hsin-ying
- Hsieh Ying-xuan
- Hsieh Yue-hsia
- Barbie Hsu
- Beatrice Hsu
- Dee Hsu
- Hsu Wei-ning
- Valen Hsu
- Vivian Hsu
- Yuki Hsu
- Terry Hu
- Albee Huang
- Esther Huang
- Kelly Huang
- Huang Pei-jia
- Lü Hsueh-feng
- Lynn Hung

== J ==
- Selina Jen
- Jian Man-shu
- Elaine Jin

== K ==
- Amber Kuo
- Francesca Kao
- Sharon Kao
- Ko Chia-yen
- Ko Shu-chin
- Claire Kuo
- Kuo Shu-yao

== L ==
- Megan Lai
- Karena Lam
- Pauline Lan
- Lee Chien-na
- Moon Lee
- Tia Lee
- Lee Yi-chieh
- Ann Li
- Li Li-hua
- Jane Liao
- Ariel Lin
- Brigitte Lin
- Lin Mei-hsiu
- Penny Lin
- Ruby Lin
- Zaizai Lin
- Esther Liu
- Leanne Liu
- Rene Liu
- Lu Hsiao-fen
- Joelle Lu
- Lu Yi-ching

== M ==
- Ma Shih-yuan
- Miao Ke-li

== O ==
- Mariko Okubo
- Judy Ongg

== P ==
- Pai Bing-bing
- Sandrine Pinna

== R ==
- Selina Ren

== S ==
- Polly Shang-Kuan Ling-feng
- Barbie Shu
- Sun Ke-fang
- Dee Shu
- Shu Qi
- Shih Szu

== T ==
- Queenie Tai
- Tang Pao-yun
- Teresa Teng
- Janel Tsai
- Pets Tseng
- Vicky Tseng
- Hebe Tien
- Tien Hsin
- Lily Tien
- Betty Ting
- Jolin Tsai
- Tsai Tsan-te
- Tsai Yi-chen
- Joanne Tseng
- Alice Tzeng

== W ==
- Cyndi Wang
- Gingle Wang
- Wang Yu-xuan
- Wanfang
- Wen Chen-ling
- Annie Wu
- Wu Ching-hsien
- Emma Wu
- Jacklyn Wu
- Pace Wu

== Y ==
- Cheryl Yang
- Yang Chieh-mei
- Yang Kuei-mei
- Yang Li-yin
- Rainie Yang
- Eleven Yao
- Annie Yi
- Ivy Yin
- Angela Yu Chien

== Z ==
- Rima Zeidan
