= Slow cinema =

Genre of art cinema

Slow cinema (sometimes called contemplative cinema) is a genre of art cinema characterised by a style that is minimalist and observational, with frequent use of long takes, emphasis on extended duration, and sparse narrative elements. Films in this style frequently use minimal dialogue and may employ nonprofessional actors. The term first came into use among cinephile communities during the 21st century, although early examples of the style date back to the postwar era.

== Characteristics ==
Works of slow cinema have been said to commonly feature the following characteristics:

- use of long takes and emphasis on duration
- understated storytelling methods
- emphasis on stillness and the mundane
- minimal dialogue
- use of nonprofessional actors

== History ==
The roots of slow cinema lie in postwar era trends such as the Italian neorealist movement, with its emphasis on observation. According to the British Film Institute, the genre's "ancestors" included Italian filmmakers Michelangelo Antonioni, Roberto Rossellini, and Vittorio De Sica as well as Russian filmmaker Andrei Tarkovsky. Yasujiro Ozu and Robert Bresson have also been identified as precursors. Antonioni has often been characterized as the "first master" of the approach, with his depictions of alienated industrial modernity extending duration beyond what was required for the narrative. The minimalist 1960s "anti-films" of pop artist Andy Warhol, such as Empire (1965), and Chantal Akerman's 1975 film Jeanne Dielman, 23, quai du Commerce, 1080 Bruxelles were also influential on the style.

Before the postwar trends commonly cited as the genre's origins, isolated precursors existed outside Europe. The Argentine film La vuelta al nido (1938), written and directed by Leopoldo Torres Ríos, has been described by critics and historians as an anomaly of its era for its intimate style, sparse dialogue, long takes, and focus on psychological interiority over external action. A commercial and critical failure on release, it was reassessed decades later as anticipating cinematic modernity by twenty years, and described by historian Domingo Di Núbila as "the first cursed film of Argentine cinema."

In the 1990s, the approach of slow cinema became more prominent across the globe and saw increased focus on sustained durations. Directors such as Béla Tarr, Lav Diaz, Tsai Ming-liang, and Pedro Costa came to prominence within this tradition. Tarr's seven-hour 1994 film Sátántangó became representative of the movement. In the 2010s, slow cinema works saw critical acclaim and award recognition, including Semih Kaplanoglu's Honey and Apichatpong Weerasethakul's Uncle Boonmee Who Can Recall His Past Lives (2010). The style reached large American audiences via Terrence Malick's The Tree of Life (2011).

The AV Festival held a Slow Cinema Weekend at Newcastle's Star and Shadow Cinema in 2012, including the films of Ben Rivers, Lav Diaz, Lisandro Alonso, and Fred Kelemen.

== Term ==
The first usage of the term "slow cinema" was likely by critic Jonathan Romney in reference to Tsai Ming-liang's 2003 film Goodbye, Dragon Inn. That year, critic Michel Ciment used the phrase "cinema of slowness" to refer to films by Tsai, Béla Tarr, and Abbas Kiarostami. In 2008, Matthew Flanagan took up the concept in the influential essay "Towards an Aesthetic of Slow in Contemporary Cinema", which identified some of the basic qualities of the slow cinema style. By the 2010s, the term had begun to catch on among Anglo-Saxon film communities, inspiring writing in Sight & Sound such as Nick James's controversial article "Passive-Aggressive", which questioned the merits of the style and prompted much debate.

== Reception ==
Sight & Sound noted of the definition of slow cinema that "The length of a shot, on which much of the debate revolves, is a quite abstract measure if divorced from what takes place within it". The Guardian contrasted the long takes of the genre with the two-second average shot length in Hollywood action movies, and noted that "they opt for ambient noises or field recordings rather than bombastic sound design, embrace subdued visual schemes that require the viewer's eye to do more work, and evoke a sense of mystery that springs from the landscapes and local customs they depict more than it does from generic convention." The genre has been described as an "act of organized resistance" similar to the Slow food movement.

=== Critique ===
Slow cinema has been criticized as indifferent or even hostile to audiences. A backlash by Sight & Sound's Nick James, and picked up by online writers, argued that early uses of long takes were "adventurous provocations created by extremists", whereas recent films are "operating within a recognized, default artistic idiom." In 2007, Steven Shapiro criticized the modern trend as backward-looking and nostalgic. The Guardian's film blog concluded that "being less overweeningly precious about films that are likely to be impenetrable to even the most well-informed audiences would seem an idea." Dan Fox of Frieze criticized both the dichotomy of the argument into "philistine" vs "pretentious" and the reductiveness of the term "slow cinema".

The American director Paul Schrader wrote about slow cinema in the new introduction to a 2018 edition of his 1972 book Transcendental Style in Film: Ozu, Bresson, Dreyer, and called it an aesthetic tool. He argues that most viewers find slow cinema boring, but that a "slow film director keeps his viewer on the hook, thinking there's a reward, a payoff just around the corner."

Recently, film scholars Katherine Fusco and Nicole Seymour have written that the slow cinema movement's supporters and detractors have both mischaracterized it. As they argue, much "commentary posits slow cinema as a kind of pastoral for the present moment, a respite from our technologically saturated ... Hollywood-blockbuster-centered era." Such commentary therefore associates the movement with pleasure and relaxation. But in reality, slow cinema films often focus on down-and-out laborers; as Fusco and Seymour argue, "for those on the fringes of society, modernity is actually experienced as slowness, and usually to their great detriment."

== Examples ==
Practitioners of the genre include Andrei Tarkovsky, Michelangelo Antonioni, Robert Bresson, Franco Piavoli, Philippe Garrel, Marguerite Duras, Aleksandr Sokurov, Béla Tarr, Chantal Akerman, Sohrab Shahid–Saless, Theo Angelopoulos, Abbas Kiarostami, Victor Erice, Jacques Rivette, Edward Yang, Hou Hsiao-hsien, Ermanno Olmi, František Vláčil, Lav Diaz, Pedro Costa, Tsai Ming-liang, Carlos Reygadas, Sharunas Bartas, Sergei Loznitsa, Hirokazu Koreeda, Naomi Kawase, Ingmar Bergman, Aleksei German and Konstantin Lopushansky.

Greek director Theo Angelopoulos has been called an "icon of the so-called Slow Cinema movement". Examples of the style include Ben Rivers's Two Years at Sea, Michelangelo Frammartino's Le Quattro Volte, and Shaun Wilson's 51 Paintings.

Recent underground film movements such as Remodernist film share the sensibility of slow or contemplative cinema.

G. Aravindan was a filmmaker whose works such as Kanchana Sita, Thampu and Esthappan have been regarded as embodying a uniquely original style of contemplative cinema where the aesthetic sensibility and philosophical insights of Indian culture could find a meditative mode of expression within more universal contexts of humanism and transcendentalism.

Recent examples of slow cinema include films by Kelly Reichardt, Bruno Dumont, Lucrecia Martel, Angela Schanelec, Albert Serra, Apichatpong Weerasethakul, Bas Devos, Jia Zhangke, Roy Andersson, Ulrich Seidl, Kim Ki-duk, Aki Kaurismaki, Pablo Stoll, Tsai Ming-Liang, Lav Diaz, Sergei Loznitsa, Carlos Reygadas, Vimukthi Jayasundara, Semih Kaplanoglu, Benedek Fliegauf, Amat Escalante, Lisandro Alonso, Kim Ki-duk, Claire Denis, Roberto Minervini, Nuri Bilge Ceylan, Fernando Eimbcke, Sharunas Bartas, Aleksei German Jr., Andrey Zvyagintsev, Scott Barley, Pedro Costa, Nicolás Pereda, Michelangelo Frammartino, Fred Kelemen, and Anocha Suwichakornpong.

=== List of notable films ===
- La vuelta al nido (1938)
- Les Dames du Bois de Boulogne (1945)
- A Man Escaped (1956)
- Pickpocket (1959)
- L'Avventura (1960)
- La Notte (1961)
- Il Posto (1961)
- Ivan's Childhood (1962)
- L'Eclisse (1962)
- The Trial of Joan of Arc (1962)
- The Fiances (1963)
- Red Desert (1964)
- Empire (1965)
- Andrei Rublev (1966)
- Au hasard Balthazar (1966)
- Blowup (1966)
- Mouchette (1967)
- Marketa Lazarová (1967)
- The Valley of the Bees (1968)
- Zabriskie Point (1970)
- La Cicatrice intérieure (1972)
- Solaris (1972)
- Still Life (1974)
- Jeanne Dielman, 23, quai du Commerce, 1080 Bruxelles (1975)
- The Passenger (1975)
- Mirror (1975)
- The Psychotronic Man (1979)
- Stalker (1979)
- Blue Planet (1982)
- L'Argent (1983)
- Nostalghia (1983)
- The Time to Live and the Time to Die (1985)
- The Sacrifice (1986)
- Terrorizers (1986)
- Dead Man's Letters (1986)
- The Lonely Voice of Man (1987)
- Kárhozat (1988)
- Landscape in the Mist (1988)
- Nostos: The Return (1989)
- A Brighter Summer Day (1991)
- Whispering Pages (1994)
- Vive l'amour (1994)
- Sátántangó (1994)
- A Couch in New York (1996)
- Voices Through Time (1996)
- The River (1997)
- Mother and Son (1997)
- Taste of Cherry (1997)
- Eternity and a Day (1998)
- The Wind Will Carry Us (1999)
- The Isle (2000)
- Yi Yi (2000)
- In Vanda's Room (2000)
- Werckmeister Harmonies (2000)
- What Time Is It There? (2001)
- Russian Ark (2002)
- Uzak (2002)
- Spring, Summer, Fall, Winter... and Spring (2003)
- Goodbye Dragon Inn (2003)
- Evolution of a Filipino Family (2004)
- Trilogy: The Weeping Meadow (2004)
- Colossal Youth (2006)
- Old Joy (2006)
- Still Life (2006)
- Syndromes and a Century (2006)
- Silent Light (2007)
- The Man from London (2007)
- Melancholia (2008)
- Wendy and Lucy (2008)
- Hadewijch (2009)
- Once Upon a Time in Anatolia (2011)
- The Turin Horse (2011)
- Hors Satan (2011)
- Uncle Boonmee Who Can Recall His Past Lives (2011)
- Post Tenebras Lux (2012)
- Norte, the End of History (2013)
- Stray Dogs (2013)
- Hard to Be a God (2013)
- Jauja (2014)
- Winter Sleep (2014)
- From What Is Before (2014)
- Horse Money (2014)
- Cemetery of Splendour (2015)
- The Assassin (2015)
- The Woman Who Left (2016)
- Hannah (2017)
- Zama (2017)
- Grain (2017)
- Sleep Has Her House (2017)
- Twin Peaks: The Return (2017)
- Vitalina Varela (2019)
- Days (2020)
- Memoria (2021)
- Pacifiction (2022)
- Skinamarink (2022)
- The Zone of Interest (2023)
- Perfect Days (2023)
- The Mastermind (2025)
- Her Private Hell (2026)

== See also ==
- Dogme 95
- List of longest films
- Slow food and the Slow movement
- Art film
- Slow cutting
- Slow television
- Structural film
- Extreme cinema
- Still image film
- Non-narrative film
- Experimental film
- Shutter speed
- American Eccentric Cinema
- Minimalist film
- Modernist film
- Postmodernist film
- Working class culture
- List of American independent films
