= 34th Golden Horse Awards =

Award ceremony for Chinese-language films of 1996 and 1997

- Date: December 13, 1997
- Site: Sun Yat-sen Memorial Hall, Taipei, Taiwan
- Hosted by: Hsui Hao-ping and Sandra Ng
- Preshow hosts: Ellen Chu and Paul Fonoroff
- Organized by: Taipei Golden Horse Film Festival Executive Committee

Highlights
- Best Feature Film: Comrades: Almost a Love Story
- Best Director: Fruit Chan; Made in Hong Kong
- Best Actor: Tse Kwan-ho; The Mad Phoenix
- Best Actress: Maggie Cheung; Comrades: Almost a Love Story
- Most awards: The Mad Phoenix (3); The Soong Sisters
- Most nominations: Wolves Cry Under the Moon (8)

Television in Taiwan
- Channel: ETTV

The 34th Golden Horse Awards (Mandarin:第34屆金馬獎) took place on December 13, 1997, at the Sun Yat-sen Memorial Hall in Taipei, Taiwan.

== Winners and nominees ==
Winners are listed first and highlighted in boldface.

**Best Feature Film**: **Comrades: Almost a Love Story**; The Mad Phoenix; Such a Life!; Made in Hong Kong; Wolves Cry Under the Moon; The River	**Best Short Film**: **Too Young**; Child, Scribble, Photograph; Oh, My Gush!; The Olfactory System
**Best Documentary**: **Homesick Eyes**; Birds of Prey in Yangmingshan National Park; Coming Home; Personal Memoir of Hong Kong: Still Love You After All These	**Best Animation**: **A Chinese Ghost Story: The Tsui Hark Animation**; Annie's Magic Raccoon; The Key to Heaven; Two Dogs, One Fish
**Best Director**: **Fruit Chan — Made in Hong Kong**; Clifton Ko — The Mad Phoenix; Wong Kar-wai — Happy Together; Ho Ping — Wolves Cry Under the Moon	**Best Leading Actor**: **Tse Kwan-ho — The Mad Phoenix**; Sam Lee — Made in Hong Kong; Leslie Cheung — Happy Together; Miao Tien — The River
**Best Leading Actress**: **Maggie Cheung — Comrades: Almost a Love Story**; Shu Qi — Love Is Not a Game, But a Joke; Karen Mok — The God of Cookery; Annie Yi — Wolves Cry Under the Moon	**Best Supporting Actor**: **Chen Jin-hsing — Love Go Go**; Poon Chan-leung — The Mad Phoenix; Ku Pao-ming — Wolves Cry Under the Moon; Eric Tsang — Comrades: Almost a Love Story
**Best Supporting Actress**: **Jane Liao — Love Go Go**; Tang Meiyun — Such a Life!; Theresa Lee — Intimates; Lah Sheau-lin — The River
**Audience Choice Award**: **Such a Life!**	**Grand Jury Award**: **Such a Life!**
**Special Jury Award**: **Ho Ping — Wolves Cry Under the Moon**	**Lifetime Achievement Award**: **Lo Wei**; **King Hu**; **Li Han-hsiang**
