= Cruisy, Sleepy, Melancholy =

2022 non-fiction book by Nicholas de Villiers

Cruisy, Sleepy, Melancholy: Sexual Disorientation in the Films of Tsai Ming-liang
- Author: Nicholas de Villiers
- Publisher: University of Minnesota Press
- Publication date: September 27, 2022
- Pages: 216
- ISBN: 9781517913182
- OCLC: 1325678329

Cruisy, Sleepy, Melancholy: Sexual Disorientation in the Films of Tsai Ming-liang is a non-fiction book by Nicholas de Villiers. Published in 2022 by the University of Minnesota Press, it analyses the queer themes in the films of Tsai Ming-liang.

== Reception ==
Cruisy, Sleepy, Melancholy was received positively by reviewers for the way in which it incorporated and built from pre-existing analysis of Tsai's work by Sara Ahmed, Kevin Moon, and José Esteban Muñoz. However, reviewers also felt that the book could be, at times, overly broad, with one saying that there were "surprising omissions" and another saying that they wished there the author had expanded more on his analysis of Brechtian alienation and ecocriticism in Tsai's work.

A review in QLQ claimed that, in spending an entire chapter analyzing the relationship between Tsai Ming-liang and actor Lee Kang-sheng, de Villiers had created foundation for the reader to understand his analysis of Tsai's 2015 film Afternoon.

Cruisy, Sleepy, Melancholy was reviewed in Film Quarterly.
