= The Hole (1998 film) =

- Directed by: Tsai Ming-liang
- Written by: Tsai Ming-liang; Yang Pi-ying
- Produced by: Cheng Su-ming; Chiu Shun-Ching; Jiang Feng-Chyt
- Starring: Yang Kuei-mei; Lee Kang-sheng
- Cinematography: Liao Pen-Jung
- Edited by: Hsiao Ju-kuan
- Music by: Grace Chang
- Distributed by: Fox Lorber
- Release date: 16 May 1998 (Cannes Film Festival)
- Running time: 95 minutes 69 minutes (Taiwan)
- Country: Taiwan
- Languages: Mandarin; Taiwanese
- Box office: $82,779

The Hole (Chinese: 洞; pinyin: dòng; lit. 'hole'), also known as The Last Dance, is a 1998 Taiwanese drama-musical film directed by Tsai Ming-liang. It stars Yang Kuei-mei and Lee Kang-sheng.

== Plot ==
Just before the turn of the new millennium, a strange disease hits Taiwan that causes people to crawl on the floor and search for dark places. It also rains constantly. Despite evacuation orders, tenants of a rundown apartment building stay put, including Hsiao Kang (Lee Kang-sheng). Hsiao Kang runs a food store with few customers.

One day, a plumber arrives at Hsiao Kang's apartment to check the pipes. He drills a small hole into the floor which comes down through the ceiling of the woman downstairs (Yang Kuei-mei). The woman, who maintains her flooded apartment while stockpiling toilet paper, becomes annoyed by Hsiao Kang's antics on the other side of the hole. She confronts him at his store.

However, the hole remains there, and the two continue to get on each other's nerves. The woman sprays her room, creating a smell that Hsiao Kang cannot stand; Hsiao Kang's alarm clock goes off, waking the woman. In spite of this, the two begin forming a connection. Someone rings Hsiao Kang's doorbell, but he does not answer. He lies down next to the hole and sticks his leg into it.

The woman catches the disease and crawls into the toilet paper fort that she made. Hsiao Kang gets distraught. He bangs on the floor near the hole with a hammer. Eventually, the woman emerges from the fort. Hsiao Kang offers her a glass of water through the hole, and she drinks it. Hsiao Kang then pulls her up through the hole. In the final scene, the two slow dance with each other.

== Cast ==
- Yang Kuei-mei - the woman downstairs
- Lee Kang-sheng - Hsiao Kang / the man upstairs
- Miao Tien - the customer
- Tong Hsiang-Chu - the plumber
- Lin Hui-Chin - a neighbor
- Lin Kun-huei - the kid

== Production ==
The Hole was made for the 2000, Seen By... project, initiated by the French company Haut et Court to produce films depicting the approaching turn of the millennium seen from the perspectives of 10 different countries.

The film was directed by Tsai Ming-liang and starred two actors he had worked with before, Yang Kuei-mei and Lee Kang-sheng. According to Tsai, Yang needed a lot of direction from him, while Lee did not need any. The two actors "never really clicked in a creative way." When they had to shoot scenes together, Yang often complained to Lee about his acting, saying that he was not working with her. Lee told Tsai on set that he did not want to be in any more of Tsai's films, but Lee went on to star in Tsai's next film, What Time Is It There? (2001). They would continue to collaborate for over 30 years.

== Reception ==
Variety described the film as an "eerie, dank, claustrophobic mood piece."

The Hole was entered into the 1998 Cannes Film Festival. It was nominated for the Palme d'Or award and won the FIPRESCI Prize (competition) "for its daring combination of realism and apocalyptic vision, desperation and joy, austerity and glamour." The film won the Gold Hugo for best feature at the 1998 Chicago International Film Festival. It also won three Silver Screen Awards at the 1999 Singapore International Film Festival - for best Asian feature film, best Asian feature film director (Tsai Ming-liang), and best actress (Yang Kuei-mei).

On the review aggregator website Rotten Tomatoes, 85% of 20 critics' reviews are positive. The website's consensus reads: "Hauntingly surreal and refreshingly original, The Hole finds love and horror in the humdrum rhythm of quarantine life."
