= Atun =

Atun may refer to:

People

- Hakkı Atun, former prime minister of the Turkish Republic of Northern Cyprus
- Norman Atun, Malaysian actor

Fish

- Leionura atun (also "snoek" or "Cape snoek"), a perch-like commercial food fish in the family Gempylidae
- Atún, Spanish for tuna (e.g. Comisión Interamericana del Atún Tropical)

Other

- Atum (also Atem or Tem), deity in Egyptian mythology
- Kabushiki-Gaisha Ātūn; see Artoon
- Atun Zaitun, a character in the Indonesian television series Si Doel Anak Sekolahan
