= The Skywalk Is Gone =

The Skywalk is Gone
- Film poster
- Directed by: Tsai Ming-liang
- Written by: Tsai Ming-liang
- Starring: Chen Shiang-chyi; Lee Kang-sheng; Lu Yi-ching
- Cinematography: Liao Pen-jung
- Production companies: Homegreen Films; Le Fresnoy
- Release date: 8 October 2002 (Canada)
- Running time: 25 minutes
- Country: Taiwan
- Language: Mandarin

The Skywalk is Gone (Mandarin name: Tianqiao bu jian le) is a 2002 Taiwanese short film directed by Tsai Ming-liang and starring Chen Shiang-chyi and Lee Kang-sheng.

== Plot ==
Shiang-chyi has returned to Taipei from her trip to Paris. She goes to the skywalk where she first met Hsiao-kang, the salesman who sold her a watch, but some construction has taken place and the skywalk is gone. She stares at a large video screen for a while and then wanders around aimlessly. After crossing a street illegally, she is stopped by a police officer, who checks her ID card. Shiang-chyi then stops at a coffee shop for a short while. She realizes that her card is missing, so she goes back to the officer to ask if he still has it. He replies that he does not.

Meanwhile, Hsiao-kang is smoking in a public toilet stall. After he finishes, he washes his hands and leaves the restroom. He then walks up some stairs on the underpass. Shiang-chyi is walking down the same flight of stairs, and they pass each other. Hsiao-kang pauses at the top of the staircase to look back down at her, but Shiang-chyi does not notice him.

Hsiao-kang then goes to audition for a new job as a pornographic actor. The director asks him a few questions and then tells him to take off his clothes. Hsiao-kang hesitates but eventually complies. He then puts on a doctor's uniform and steps out onto the balcony to start filming.

The short ends with music playing over a scene of clouds moving in real-time.

== Cast ==
- Chen Shiang-chyi
- Lee Kang-sheng
- Lu Yi-ching

== Background ==
Actors Chen Shiang-chyi and Lee Kang-sheng both reprised their roles from Tsai Ming-liang's previous film What Time Is It There? Their characters would also appear in Tsai's next film, The Wayward Cloud.

One of the principal locations of What Time Is It There? was the skywalk in front of the New Railway Station. The skywalk was torn down after shooting the film, and this short is based on that fact. Director Tsai Ming-liang later joked that "It seems that many places that I shot for my films have vanished. This is kind of worrying!"

A major theme of this film is the urbanization of Taipei. The song playing at the end of it is called "Nanping Bell".

== Release and reception ==
The Skywalk Is Gone was the first short film to ever get a theatrical commercial run in Taiwan. However, it was shown in only one theater. It was included on the DVD for the film Goodbye, Dragon Inn.

The short was generally well received by critics. It won the Grand Prize at the 2003 Vila do Conde International Short Film Festival. According to the Taipei Times: "Its self-referential natures makes Skywalk somewhat difficult to understand, but Tsai maintains high production values and the short film is filled with precise shots, beautiful photography and good performances."
