= The River (1997 film) =

1997 film by Tsai Ming-liang

- DVD cover
- Chinese: 河流
- Literal meaning: river
- Hanyu Pinyin: héliú
- Hokkien POJ: hô-liû
- Directed by: Tsai Ming-liang
- Written by: Tsai Ming-liang; Tsai Yi-chun; Yang Pi-ying
- Produced by: Shiu Shun-ching; Chung Hu-ping; Hsu Li-kong
- Starring: Lee Kang-sheng; Miao Tien; Lu Yi-ching
- Cinematography: Liao Pen-jung
- Edited by: Chan Sing-Cheong; Lei Chen-ching
- Distributed by: Strand Releasing
- Release date: August 27, 1997 (France)
- Running time: 115 minutes
- Country: Taiwan
- Languages: Taiwanese Mandarin; Taiwanese Hokkien

The River is a 1997 Taiwanese film directed by Tsai Ming-liang and starring Lee Kang-sheng, Miao Tien, and Lu Yi-ching. The plot centers on a family who has to deal with the son's neck pain. In 2003, a critic called it Tsai's "bleakest film."

== Plot ==
Hsiao-Kang (Lee Kang-sheng), a young man in his 20s, is going up an escalator in Taipei when he meets an old girlfriend of his (Chen Shiang-chyi). She convinces him to accompany her to a film shoot that she is working on. While eating lunch, Hsiao-Kang is spotted by the film's director (Ann Hui). The scene that they are currently shooting needs an actor to pretend to be a floating dead body in the river, Hsiao-Kang reluctantly agrees to step in. He lies face down in the dirty Tamsui River for a few seconds, pretending to be a dead body.

After the scene is completed, he and his old girlfriend get a room in a hotel so Hsiao-Kang can take a shower. The two then have sex. Hsiao-Kang drives home on his motorcycle and begins to feel some soreness in his neck. He eventually falls off the bike, and a man, later shown to be his father (Miao Tien), tries to help him up, but Hsiao-Kang ignores him and drives the rest of the way back. During the night, water from the room above leaks into his father’s bedroom; he tries using buckets but can’t fix it.

By that night, his neck pain is even worse. He goes to his mother (Lu Yi-ching), and she rubs some lotion on him. However, the pain does not go away. The family tries different methods of healing, including acupuncture, but nothing works, and Hsiao-Kang begins to wish he were dead. Meanwhile, it is apparent that the family is fractured, with communication problems. Hsiao-Kang's father regularly visits a bathhouse and has sexual encounters with other young men. The mother is having an affair with a pornographer.

Finally, Hsiao-Kang and his father travel to see a provincial healer. The healer is not able to foresee anything on their first visit, so they rent a hotel room. That night, they both go to the same bathhouse, separately. Hsiao-Kang eventually walks into his dad's room in the dark, and his father gives him a handjob. When his father turns the light on and sees his son, he slaps him, and Hsiao-Kang runs out. They meet back at the hotel room. Meanwhile his mother notices the leakage and fixes it by climbing to the upper floor where the source of the leakage is revealed to be a running faucet.

The next morning, the father receives a phone call from the healer, who says that he cannot help them. The father then wakes Hsiao-Kang up and says that they're leaving. Hsiao-Kang walks out onto the hotel room balcony, while clutching his neck and grimacing in pain.

== Cast ==
- Lee Kang-sheng as Hsiao-Kang (小康 Xiǎokāng)
- Miao Tien as Father
- Lu Hsiao-ling as Mother
- Ann Huei as Film director
- Chen Shiang-chyi as Hsiao-Kang's girlfriend
- Chen Chao-jung as Young man at sauna
- Lu Chiao-lin as Mother's lover
- Yang Kuei-Mei as Girl in hotel

== Production ==
The family configuration in this film also appeared in director Tsai Ming-liang's previous film, Rebels of the Neon God, and would appear again in What Time Is It There?, with the same three actors. Tsai decided to incorporate neck pain into The River when his star actor, Lee Kang-sheng, had a similar neck problem for nine months prior to shooting Tsai's Vive L'Amour. After Vive L'Amour was completed, they immediately began work on The River.

According to Tsai, he had a difficult time convincing actor Miao Tien (who plays the father) to appear in the film. Miao was reluctant because his character was homosexual. However, he eventually agreed to take the part and ended up doing some research for it by visiting gay bars and saunas.

The film was first released in 1997 and opened in the United States in 2001.

== Reception ==
The River won the Silver Bear - Special Jury Prize award at the 47th Berlin International Film Festival.

Overall, it was well received by critics and has a 70% rating at Rotten Tomatoes based on 10 reviews. The New York Times' A. O. Scott wrote that, "Whether or not The River is, as some critics have claimed, Mr. Tsai's masterpiece, it is an excellent introduction to his oblique narrative style, his favored themes and his careful, lyrical visual sensibility." Critics focused on the film's themes of loneliness, alienation, and isolation, as well as the lack of dialogue and action which represented the family members' disconnect with each other. Allmovie said that: "Perhaps the most harrowing of Tsai Ming-Liang's meditations on urban isolation and communication breakdown, The River is a reliably demanding exponent of the Taiwanese filmmaker's cinema ... The movie trains the director's unblinking gaze on the breakdown of the nuclear family."

Critics also commented on the film's slow pace, calling it "punishing" and "difficult," but still praised Tsai Ming-liang's style of directing. According to Edward Guthmann of the San Francisco Chronicle: "Tsai is so adept at pacing and mood, and so good at capturing a sense of yearning, that his film draws us in despite its unusually long takes and sparse cutting." A. O. Scott concluded his review with:

"[The film is] worth waiting for. The pace of The River is slow, and Mr. Tsai's minimal camera movement and deliberate editing may take some getting used to, especially in an era of hectic cutting and hand-held hyperactivity. But he is one of those filmmakers whose visions, once encountered, are hard to shake, a rare director who seems, even at this late date, to be reinventing the medium and rediscovering the world."

Tsai himself said that he received a lot of criticism for The River. He said that, in addition to some people disliking it because of the incest scene, homosexuals and feminists also disliked it for other reasons. Lee Kang-sheng's father called it a "porn movie."

In the British Film Institute's 2012 Sight & Sound polls of the greatest films ever made, The River received top-10 votes from two critics and two directors.
