= I Don't Want to Sleep Alone =

- The Taiwanese theatrical release poster
- Chinese: 黑眼圈
- Literal meaning: black eye circles
- Hanyu Pinyin: Hēiyǎnquān
- Directed by: Tsai Ming-liang
- Written by: Tsai Ming-liang
- Produced by: Bruno Pésery; Vincent Wang
- Starring: Lee Kang-sheng; Norman Atun; Chen Shiang-chyi; Pearlly Chua
- Cinematography: Liao Pen-jung; Tsai Ming-liang
- Edited by: Chen Sheng-chang
- Distributed by: Axiom Films (UK and Ireland); Fortissimo Films; Strand Releasing
- Release dates: 4 September 2006 (Venice Film Festival); 23 March 2007 (Taiwan); 17 May 2007 (Malaysia)
- Running time: 115 minutes
- Countries: Malaysia; Taiwan
- Languages: Taiwanese Hokkien; Cantonese; Malay; Mandarin; Bengali

I Don't Want to Sleep Alone is a 2006 Malaysian-Taiwanese romantic drama film written and directed by Tsai Ming-liang. Lee Kang-sheng stars in a dual role as a brain-dead patient and as an injured homeless man. The film also stars Norman Atun and Chen Shiang-chyi.

== Plot ==
The film tells two parallel stories. A brain-dead man, or Paralyzed Guy (as identified in the credits; played by Lee) is abused by his mother and cared for by his family's maid (Chen). Meanwhile, a homeless day laborer, or Homeless Guy (as identified in the credits; also played by Lee) is severely beaten by a mob before being carried home on a mattress around the streets in Kuala Lumpur by a group of men, including Rawang (Atun), a Bangladeshi migrant worker.

Rawang slowly nurses Homeless Guy back to health. We follow the routine of their everyday life: Rawang cares for him, cleans him, and sleeps next to him. They share the newly salvaged mattress together in their makeshift home in an abandoned, flooded construction site. Rawang himself begins to fall in love with Homeless Guy and is thwarted in his attempts to show his affections by a heavy, choking smog that has affected Kuala Lumpur.

The movie switches scenes to show us Paralyzed Guy, who is immobile from the neck down and is cared for by a family maid. Like Rawang, the family maid is tasked to attend to Paralyzed Guy's daily needs. At the same time, strangers began entering the house and it is slowly revealed that the house is being put on sale.

Upon Homeless Guy's recovery, he begins sneaking out at night where he has sexual encounters with an older woman and the family maid, for whom he is developing feelings. Rawang is seemingly oblivious to his relationship, or even if he is aware, has chosen not to interfere with Homeless Guy's romantic attractions.

However, when Homeless Guy decides to move in with the family maid, taking along the mattress that he shares with Rawang, Rawang spirals into a jealous rage. He threatens Homeless Guy with a sharp tin can lid on his throat. The camera itself breaks away from habit. At this point, it ceases to be a distanced observer and instead, focuses on Rawang's and Homeless Guy's faces, displaying anger and guilt. Rawang is ultimately unsuccessful with his vengeance, to which Homeless Guy responds by wiping away Rawang's tears.

The film ends with a "dream" shot where the three lovers, the family maid, Homeless Guy and Rawang, share the same mattress and they descend down the screen. Homeless Guy embraces them both as the mattress floats across the surface of the water.

== Cast ==
- Lee Kang-sheng as Paralyzed Guy and Homeless Guy
- Chen Shiang-chyi as Family Maid
- Norman Atun as Rawang
- Pearlly Chua as Coffee-Shop Boss
- Lee-Lin Liew as Coffee-Shop Tea Maker
- Leonard Tee as Light Seller
- Su-Yee Toh as Boss's Second Son
- Kok-Fai Chiew as Boss's Grandson
- Rong-Sin Chan as Estate Agent
- Kok-Choy Loh as Financier
- Shiva as Worker
- Mohammad Rani Bin Baker as Magician
- Rusli Bin Abdul Rahim as Hooligan
- Azman Hassan as Hooligan
- Hariry Jalil as Hooligan

== Release ==
I Don't Want to Sleep Alone was among several films commissioned by Peter Sellars' New Crowned Hope Festival in Vienna in 2006, to commemorate the 250th anniversary of the birth of Wolfgang Amadeus Mozart.

The film had its world premiere on 4 September 2006 at the 64th Venice International Film Festival. It made its North American premiere on 11 September at the 2006 Toronto International Film Festival. It was also screened at the Vancouver International Film Festival, the Pusan International Film Festival, the London Film Festival, the Festival of Three Continents, the London Lesbian and Gay Film Festival, the Deauville Asian Film Festival, and the Hong Kong International Film Festival.

It opened in general release in Taiwan on 23 March 2007, and after a censorship controversy in Malaysia, a version specially edited by director Tsai Ming-liang opened in Malaysian cinemas on 17 May 2007. The film had a limited release in New York City on 9 May 2007, and was released in the United Kingdom on 16 November 2007.

== Reception ==
On review aggregator website Rotten Tomatoes, I Don't Want to Sleep Alone has an approval rating of 87% based on 39 reviews, with an average rating of 7.1/10. The website's critical consensus reads, "With little dialogue, Tsai Ming-liang takes the viewer through a powerful journey of loneliness and longing". On Metacritic, the film has a weighted average score of 78 out of 100, based on 6 critics, indicating "generally favorable".

A. O. Scott of The New York Times praises Tsai's direction, in particular, his choice of silence and camera movement (or lack of). He writes, "Tsai's meticulously composed fables of longing and disconnection are lurid and comical as well as poignant", and calls Tsai a "reigning genius of camera placement" in his ability to introduce a dreamlike quality to everyday routine. The Guardian's Peter Bradshaw gave the film 3/5 stars, tracing the film's inception as nurtured specifically for the purpose of the film festival circuit, but failed to be as compelling, and "tend dangerously towards self-parody". Writing for The New Yorker, Richard Brody praises Tsai's capacity to show empathy for his characters: "this record of grinding frustration and fleeting tenderness, composed mainly of static long takes, plays out in a deadened, polyglot, pan-urban landscape of globalization's unfulfilled promise—instead of a world brought together".

== Censorship in Malaysia ==
The Malaysian Censorship Board on 4 March 2007 decided to ban this film, which was shot in Malaysia, based on 18 incidences shown in the film depicting the country "in a bad light" for cultural, ethical and racial reasons. However, they later allowed the film to be screened in the country after Tsai agreed to censor parts of the film according to the requirements of the Censorship Board.
