= On Happiness Road =

- Chinese: 幸福路上
- Hanyu Pinyin: Xìng fú lù shàng
- Directed by: Sung Hsin-yin
- Screenplay by: Sung Hsin-yin
- Produced by: Sylvia Feng
- Starring: Gwei Lun-mei; Chen Bor-jeng; Jane Liao; Wei Te-sheng
- Music by: Wen Tzu-chieh
- Production company: Happiness Road Productions
- Distributed by: Ablaze Image
- Release dates: October 15, 2017 (BIFF); January 5, 2018 (Taiwan)
- Running time: 110 minutes
- Country: Taiwan
- Languages: Taiwanese Hokkien; Mandarin; English
- Budget: NT$50 million
- Box office: NT$13 million (Taiwan)

On Happiness Road is a 2017 Taiwanese animated film written and directed by Sung Hsin-yin, her directoral debut. The film is based on her own animated short of the same name which won start-up funding at the Golden Horse Awards in 2013. It was screened at the Busan International Film Festival on October 15, 2017, and saw a theatrical release in Taiwan on January 5, 2018. The film has won numerous awards, including Best Feature Film during the 2018 Tokyo Anime Award Festival, Best Animation Feature at the 2018 Golden Horse Awards, as well as Grand Prize, Best Animation, and Audience Choice Award at the 2018 Taipei Film Festival, and was also submitted for nomination to the 2018 Academy Awards in the Animated Feature Film category. The theme song under the same title was sung by pop star Jolin Tsai.

== Plot ==
Chi was born in Taiwan on April 5, 1975, the day Chiang Kai-shek died, and so she grew up during a time when Taiwan slowly transformed from a single-party dictatorship to a democracy. After immigrating to the United States, she receives news of her grandmother's death. When she returns to Taiwan for the funeral, memories from her childhood and adolescence return to her. As she reconnects family, friends, neighbors and acquaintances from her childhood, she begins to reflect on the nature of her unhappiness. As she reminisces about her childhood and the political backdrop of her upbringing, she sees how her native land has changed in her absence and reflects on how she had changed during that time as well.

== Cast ==
- Gwei Lun-mei as adult Chi
- Bella Wu as young Chi
- Chen Bor-jeng as Chi's father
- Jane Liao as Chi's mother
- Giwas Gigo as Chi's grandmother
- Wei Te-sheng as Wen
- Chia-hsiu Li as adult Betty
- Penny Huang as young Betty
- Alan Hsu as young Hsu Sheng-en

== Production ==
Sung was inspired to tell her personal story of growing up in Taiwan in film school at Columbia College Chicago after the film Persepolis (film) during a class. After graduation, she created a 13-minute short animation which won the grand prize at the Golden Horse Film Project Promotion in 2013. The award of 1 million NTD allowed her to start expanding the short into a full-length feature. Securing further funding for the film was difficult, since many Chinese investors would not invest in a film which covered Taiwan's political history. In support of the project, director Wei Te-sheng and actress Gwei Lun-mei worked as voice actors in the film for free.

The film is entirely hand-drawn, with some of the animation done in Indonesia.

== Awards and nominations ==
Award	Category	Recipients	Result	Ref.
55th Golden Horse Awards	Best Animation Feature	On Happiness Road	Won	
55th Golden Horse Awards	Best Adapted Screenplay	Sung Hsin-yin	Nominated	
2018 Tokyo Anime Awards Festival	Best Feature Film	On Happiness Road	Won	
2018 Taipei Film Festival	Grand Prize	On Happiness Road	Won	
2018 Taipei Film Festival	Best Animation	On Happiness Road	Won	
2018 Taipei Film Festival	Audience Choice Award	On Happiness Road	Won	
2018 Asia Pacific Screen Awards	Best Animated Feature Film	On Happiness Road	Nominated	
2018 Stuttgart International Film Festival	Animovie Award	On Happiness Road	Won	
