= Journey to the West (2014 film) =

- Film poster
- Directed by: Tsai Ming-liang
- Written by: Tsai Ming-liang; Wu Cheng'en
- Based on: Journey to the West (inspiration)
- Produced by: Frédéric Bellaïche; Vincent Wang
- Starring: Lee Kang-sheng; Denis Lavant
- Cinematography: Antoine Héberlé
- Edited by: Lei Chen-ching
- Music by: Sébastien Mauro
- Production company: House on Fire
- Release date: 9 February 2014 (Berlin International Film Festival)
- Running time: 56 minutes
- Countries: France; Taiwan
- Language: None

Journey to the West (Chinese: 西遊; pinyin: Xīyóu) is a 2014 French-Taiwanese film directed by Tsai Ming-liang. The title is inspired by the 16th century Chinese literary classic of the same name. It had its world premiere at the Panorama section of the 64th Berlin International Film Festival in February 2014. It is an entry in Tsai's "Walker series" of films.

== Synopsis ==
The film content consists almost entirely of long, minimalist sequences showing a Buddhist monk in saffron robe walking very (almost imperceptibly) slowly — according to the Zen kinhin (walking meditation) practice — through public spaces in Marseille, France, while passersby swarm around him. It begins, however, with a long, extreme closeup on the French actor Denis Lavant, who is later seen following the monk and matching his every move.

== Release ==
Journey to the West is included among the "Extras" on the Stray Dogs Blu-ray from Cinema Guild.
