= The Bold Three =

1972 Hong Kong film by Fu Ching-hua

- Film poster
- Traditional Chinese: 龍虎豹
- Simplified Chinese: 龙虎豹
- Hanyu Pinyin: Lóng Hǔ Pào
- Jyutping: Lung4 Fu2 Paau3
- Directed by: Fu Ching-hua
- Screenplay by: Hsiang Yang
- Produced by: Fu Ching-hua
- Starring: Chan Hung-lit; Yik Yuen; Miao Tien; Doris Lung
- Production companies: Eng Wah & Co. HK; Lucky Star Film Company
- Distributed by: Eng Wah & Co. HK
- Release date: 1972
- Running time: 89 minutes
- Country: Hong Kong
- Language: Mandarin

The Bold Three is a 1972 Hong Kong martial arts film produced by and directed by Fu Ching-hua and starring Chan Hung-lit, Yik Yuen, Miao Tien as titular trio protagonists.

== Cast ==
- Chan Hung-lit as Leung Tse-john (Dragon)
- Yik Yuen as Chiao Tien-hou (Leopard)
- Miao Tien as Boss Tiger Shih Hou
- Doris Lung as Sung Sung
- Wong Jun as Uncle Chen Chie-hao
- Lu Bi-yun as Mama Leung
- Mei Fang-yu as Japanese samurai
- Chen Chien-ping as Master Leung
- Su Chin-lung
- Yueh Feng as Shih's thug
- Wong Chau-hung as Shih's thug
- Chiang Tao as Shih's thug
- Ma Cheung as Shih's thug
- Lee Hae-ryong as Chang Lieh

== Crew ==
- Action Director: Yen Yu-lung
- Production Manager: Lee Po-tong
- Executive Director: Cheng Yi-nan

== Production ==
The Bold Three was filmed on location in Taiwan.
