= Help Me Eros =

Help Me, Eros
- Homegreen Films poster for Help Me, Eros
- Directed by: Lee Kang-sheng
- Written by: Lee Kang-sheng
- Produced by: Tsai Ming-liang; Vincent Wang
- Starring: Lee Kang-sheng; Jane Liao; Dennis Nieh; Ivy Yin
- Cinematography: Liao Pen-jung
- Edited by: Lei Chen-ching
- Music by: Yasuda Fumio
- Distributed by: Homegreen Films
- Release dates: September 4, 2007 (Venice); January 11, 2008 (Taiwan)
- Running time: 120 minutes
- Country: Taiwan
- Language: Mandarin

Help Me, Eros (Chinese: 幫幫我，愛神) is the second film from director Lee Kang-sheng, following his directorial debut in 2003, The Missing.

The film centers on the lives of three socially isolated characters – the newly unemployed Ah Jie (Lee Kang-sheng), the call center counsellor he depends on for support, Chyi (Jane Liao), and Shin (Ivy Yin), one of the team of provocatively dressed girls employed in selling betel nuts and cigarettes to passing customers at a street kiosk below his apartment.

== Plot ==
The film is set in modern Kaohsiung, Taiwan. The infamous opening sequence depicts the protagonist lying on the designer sofa in his apartment watching a cookery segment on his TV, in which a carp is swiftly scaled, gutted, cooked and served alive, its mouth still slowly opening and closing.

Jie ambles around his almost bare apartment, cooking instant noodles, tending his treasured marijuana plants in their closet nursery and explaining his problems to counsellor Chyi on the suicide hotline. A former stockbroker, recently fired, he resorts to selling off his remaining designer furniture at a nearby pawn shop to maintain his paltry existence.

Chyi, the counsellor he compulsively requests from the hotline call center, is a young but overweight woman. Jie pleads with her over the line for more satisfying contact, but she is reluctant to accede. Jie fantasises about Chyi, idealising her as beautiful girl in a revealing costume pleasuring herself to the sound of his voice and exhaling the marijuana smoke he breathes onto the telephone handset. When she leaves work for her marital home she finds her husband in a frenzy of activity, preparing an enormous gourmet meal for her. She eats alone whilst he watches TV with his conspicuously attractive friend, who he informs her will be staying with them for a while. He fills the bathtub with live eels whilst she sits watching in her underwear. She attempts to maneuver her husband into sex, but he flinches away from her touch. Left alone in the bathroom, Chyi playfully pushes them around with her toes. Later in the evening, as she walks past the two of them playing pool on her way to the kitchen for a tub of ice cream, the camera pans to reveal that both men are naked from the waist down.

In the street kiosk below, the betel nut beauties sit at a counter above street level and wait for customers. The newest employee, Shin, struggles to fit in with the more established girls. Jie pays her for cigarettes with an out-of-circulation coin and earns her a reprimand. One night, as she tries to remove her scooter from the crowded rank outside the building, Jie stops to assist her. In return he asks her to drive her somewhere.

They arrive at a used-car lot, and whilst Shin waits on the scooter Jie slips into the lot and opens one of the cars using a key he has brought with him, revealing it to be yet another piece of property he has given up since losing his job. He and Shin drive around the city, taking their own photograph using a speed camera, and eventually park up somewhere in the city for Jie to smoke a joint of his home-grown marijuana. He cups his hands around his and Shin's faces to allow her to breathe his exhaled smoke.

Abruptly, the couple are shown copulating in a number of extraordinarily acrobatic positions, most of which involve Jie suspending Shin completely in his arms. As they relax in bed afterwards, Jie at his laptop and Shin lying next to him, Chyi contacts Jie on MSN. Her personal image is of her and a thinner co-worker who Jie assumes must be her. Chyi is too ashamed to deny it and plays along. The next day Jie waits outside the hotline office for the woman in the photo, who he follows around the city for a while. He mentions the details of her itinerary to Chyi when he next calls in, provoking confused denials.

At the street kiosk one of the more established girls, who has formed a more personal relationship with a regular client in an expensive car, leans in on the promise of another gift and the man attempts to drive off with her. She is dragged along the road for a few feet before she finally falls back to the street and the car speeds off. The other girls take her inside to console her and Jie brings her some of his marijuana, which he then shares with all of the betel nut girls. This scene implies that his plants produce a powerful sexually intoxicating effect. Jie ends up on the roof of the apartment building in a languid threesome with two betel nut girls. Brand logos are projected across their entangled bodies from an unseen source.

The next morning Shin comes up to Jie's apartment. He had asked her to bring water, and she has brought two small bottles of mineral water. She quickly realizes that the apartment's water and power have been turned off due to his non-payment of his bills. She offers to help him pay his bills, implying a furtherance of their relationship, and he stubbornly refuses to discuss it. He becomes aggressive with her, angry that she has misunderstood his request for water – he needs industrial quantities to keep his marijuana plants alive. Shin is outraged by his attitude and pulls his plants out of the cupboard, smashing the pots underfoot and trampling them into the floor with her patent leather boots.

Shin takes a bus back to a rural area and finds work on a large plantation. Back at the apartment building, Jie appears remorseful and hangs around the kiosk, asking after her. When he begs one of the other girls to text Shin, she informs him that Shin does not want to speak to him. He sells the rest of his possessions, including his TV and sofa, and uses the proceeds to buy lottery tickets.

Jie calls the hotline and leaves a message for Chyi, who is eating at a roadside restaurant and watching the cooking program that demonstrated the live carp preparation in the opening sequence of the film. It is her husband and his lover presenting it, on location at an ostrich farm. They are attempting to cook an ostrich egg omelette, but when they break the egg into the pan, a dead baby ostrich is released into the hot oil. At the sight of this gruesome image, Chyi runs to the riverside to be sick. As she recovers, she receives a text from her office saying that Jie has called to say that he plans to kill himself. He has left an address and she hurries to his apartment building.

Shin watches the shower of lottery tickets

In his apartment, Jie attempts to kill himself by turning on the gas canister for his stove and lying on the floor. He awakes later, dazed but alive, to discover that the canister is empty. He opens the street-side windows and steps onto the windowsill as Chyi hurries up the stairs. Meanwhile, Shin returns and approaches the street kiosk.

Chyi bursts into the apartment to find it empty. Standing on the street below, Shin is suddenly covered in a shower of lottery tickets. Jie has apparently disappeared somewhere between the window and the street.

== Cast ==
- Lee Kang-sheng
- Jane Liao
- Ivy Yin
- Dennis Nieh
- Tracy Chou

== Title ==
The literal translation of the Taiwanese title is 'Help Me, God of Love', since Eros is an artifact of Greece-Roman mythology. The exclamation is a wry reference to the film's comically cynical perspective on human relationships, in which a wide variety of unlikely subjects – food, marijuana and live eels, amongst others – become substitute objects of comfort and affection for the protagonists. The plea for help is also a strong theme in the form of the suicide hotline.

== Awards and nominations ==
Help Me Eros was nominated for two 2008 Asian Film Awards in the categories of Best Cinematographer (which DP Pen-Jung Liao won) and Best Production Designer (Tsai Ming-Liang), and for the Golden Lion at the Venice Film Festival in 2007. It won the Grand Prix Asturias award in the Gijón International Film Festival for Best Feature. The film also won a Best Actor award (for Lee Kang Sheng) and an ADF Cinematography Award for Cinematography Pen-Jung Liao at the Buenos Aires International Festival of Independent Cinema, where it was also nominated for Best Film. The film was also nominated for the Golden Montgolfiere at the 2007 Nantes Three Continents Festival, the Festival Prize of Grand Prize at the 2008 Taipei Film Festival and the Grand Prize at the 2007 Tokyo Filmex.
