= Days (2020 film) =

2020 film

- Film poster
- Traditional Chinese: 日子
- Hanyu Pinyin: Rìzi
- Directed by: Tsai Ming-liang
- Written by: Tsai Ming-liang
- Produced by: Claude Wang
- Starring: Lee Kang-sheng
- Cinematography: Chang Jhong-yuan
- Edited by: Chang Jhong-yuan
- Production companies: Homegreen Films; Taiwan Public Television Service
- Release date: 27 February 2020 (Berlinale)
- Running time: 127 minutes
- Country: Taiwan
- Language: Mandarin

Days (Chinese: 日子; pinyin: Rìzi) is a 2020 Taiwanese drama film directed by Tsai Ming-liang. Typical of slow cinema and many Tsai films, Days is minimalist, slowly paced, and features little dialogue, without subtitles. Lee Kang-sheng plays Kang, and Non is portrayed by Anong Houngheuangsy, a Laotian immigrant to Thailand in his first film role.

Days was selected to compete for the Golden Bear in the main competition section at the 70th Berlin International Film Festival, where it won the Teddy Award.

== Plot ==
Minimalist long takes of daily life show the middle-aged and middle class Kang (Lee), and the younger Non (Houngheuangsy). Kang lives alone, relaxing in his big house with a view of a goldfish pond in his backyard. Non lives in a spartan apartment. His day begins with religious worship at an altar. He then completes chores, namely the washing of vegetables. Kang travels to the city, seeking treatment for pain in his head and neck. After an acupuncture session, he schedules a massage at the parlor where Non works. Kang pays Non after the full body massage ends, and also gives him a gift, a small music box. Kang watches Non use the box, then shares a meal with him at the fast food restaurant nearby. Kang returns to his home where he tends to his fish and sleeps alone. In the street one night, Non sits on a bench and takes the music box out of his backpack. He plays it again, but it can hardly be heard over the roadway noise.

== Cast ==
- Lee Kang-sheng as Kang
- Anong Houngheuangsy as Non

== Production ==
Principal photography took place starting in 2014, during and after Tsai Ming-liang, Lee Kang-sheng, Claude Wang, and a cinematographer attended a theatre tour in Europe, followed by medical treatment in Hong Kong for Lee, which was also filmed. The film's opening scene was shot in Tsai's living room in Taiwan. In 2017, Tsai met Houngheuangsy and the two maintained contact via videotelephony, through which Tsai recognized Houngheuangsy's skill in cooking. Some earlier scenes featuring Lee were not used, and Tsai traveled to Bangkok to film on location, including scenes of Houngheuangsy making food. Tsai discussed with his cinematographer about ways to incorporate the captured footage into a film. The film underwent a long-term post-production in Taiwan. In May and June 2019, Tsai secured funding from the Public Television Service to complete post-production. Prior to the release of Days, Tsai Ming-liang discussed the film without naming it, stating that he was working without a concept for film in mind, adding only that it was to feature Lee Kang-sheng and another actor.

== Release ==
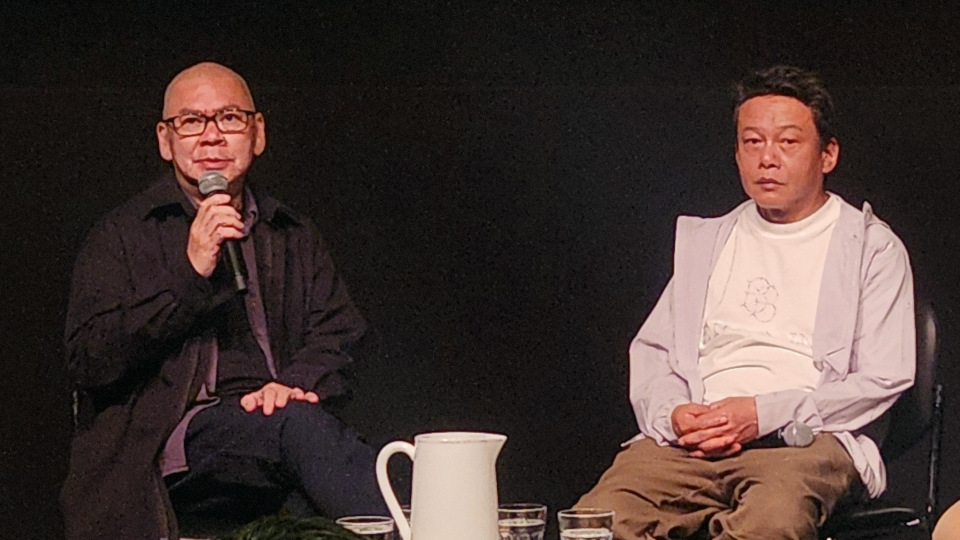
Director Tsai Ming-liang (left) and actor Lee Kang-sheng presenting Days in 2025

Days was selected to compete for the Golden Bear in the main competition section at the 70th Berlin International Film Festival. It won the jury Teddy Award at the 70th Berlinale.

Its premiere in the United States was scheduled for April 2020, at the Museum of Modern Art. Due to the COVID-19 pandemic, that showing was cancelled. The film was shown at the 2020 New York Film Festival.
