= Stray Dogs (2013 film) =

- Theatrical release poster
- Directed by: Tsai Ming-liang
- Written by: Peng Fei; Tsai Ming-liang; Tung Cheng Yu
- Produced by: Vincent Wang
- Starring: Lee Kang-sheng
- Cinematography: Liao Pen-jung; Lu Ching-hsin; Shong Woon-chong
- Edited by: Lei Chen-ching
- Distributed by: Cinema Guild (USA)
- Release date: September 4, 2013 (Venice Film Festival)
- Running time: 138 minutes
- Countries: Taiwan; France
- Language: Mandarin

Stray Dogs (Chinese: 郊遊, French: Les Chiens errants) is a 2013 drama film written and directed by Tsai Ming-liang. The Mandarin title of the film is Jiaoyou, which means "excursion." An international co-production of Taiwan and France, the film stars Lee Kang-sheng.

== Plot summary ==
A man and his two young children, a boy and a girl, are homeless in Taipei. During the day, the father has a job holding up a sign advertising real estate along a busy thoroughfare. The children spend their time wandering around stores and the cityscape, which appears to be mostly depopulated. The family meets at night to wash in public bathrooms and sleep in a makeshift shelter they have established in an abandoned building. Only occasional casual conversations are overheard. Long wordless sequences pass of the man performing daily activities: eating, drinking, sleeping, smoking, urinating, defecating, sometimes weeping. Obviously depressed, he violently assaults, then eats, an anthropomorphic cabbage that his daughter has kept as a toy. A woman, the kids' mother or at least a mother-like figure, stealthily observes the family. She "rescues" them from the rainstorm-drenched punt where the father has tried to take them, and later joins the family in an abandoned building assuming her maternal role.

== Cast ==
- Lee Kang-sheng – father
- Lu Yi-ching – woman
- Chen Shiang-chyi – woman
- Yang Kuei-mei – woman
- Lee Yi-cheng – Yi-cheng, son
- Lee Yi-chieh – Yi-chieh, daughter
- Wu Jin-kai – Wang

== Background ==
Stray Dogs was the 10th feature film directed by Tsai. The film was written by Tsai, Peng Fei, and Tung Cheng Yu, and it was produced by Vincent Wang. It starred Tsai's regular lead actor, Lee Kang-sheng, as the father. The two siblings in the film were played by actual siblings, who are Lee's nephew and niece and Tsai's godchildren.

== Themes ==
Stray Dogs is similar to Tsai's previous films in some ways. According to J. Hoberman of The New York Times, "Like other films by Mr. Tsai, it has a postapocalyptic feel. Torrential rain is virtually constant, and Taipei feels depopulated — a place where events, mostly concerning food and shelter, may be staged in situ."

Tony Rayns of Film Comment wrote that, unlike Tsai's previous films, Stray Dogs "does away almost completely with continuity editing. Most of its scenes are single shots, and there's no causal link between one and the next. Some shots are so realist that they could have been taken with a hidden camera. Others are so stylized that they might well represent dreams."

== Reception ==
Stray Dogs has an 86% rating on Rotten Tomatoes. It won the Grand Jury Prize at the 70th Venice International Film Festival.

Stephen Holden of The New York Times wrote a mixed review for the film. Calling it a "glum, humorless exercise in Asian miserablism", he wrote that "Stray Dogs, with its glacial pace and disconnected narrative, often feels more like an art installation than like a movie." He added that the film "sustains a hypnotic intensity anchored in exquisite cinematography that portrays the modern industrial cityscape as a chilly wasteland."

== Release ==
Stray Dogs was released in theaters on September 12, 2014.

It was released on DVD and Blu-ray by the Cinema Guild on February 10, 2015. The film Journey to the West was also included.
