= Norman Atun =

Malaysian actor

- Occupation: Actor
- Years active: 2006 - present

Norman Atun is a film actor from Kuala Lumpur, Malaysia.

== Career ==
Since 2006, Atun has appeared in two films, both directed by Tsai Ming-liang.

While working as a food vendor, Atun was spotted by Tsai and later, with no prior acting experience, had a starring role as Rawang in the comedy-drama film I Don't Want to Sleep Alone (2006). He followed that role with an appearance as Man in the Boat in the comedy-drama film Face (2009).

=== Filmography ===
Year	Title	Genre	Role	Notes
2006	I Don't Want to Sleep Alone	comedy-drama	Rawang	
2009	Face	comedy-drama	Man in the Boat	
