= Tsai Ming-liang =

Malaysian-Taiwanese filmmaker (born 1957)

- 蔡明亮
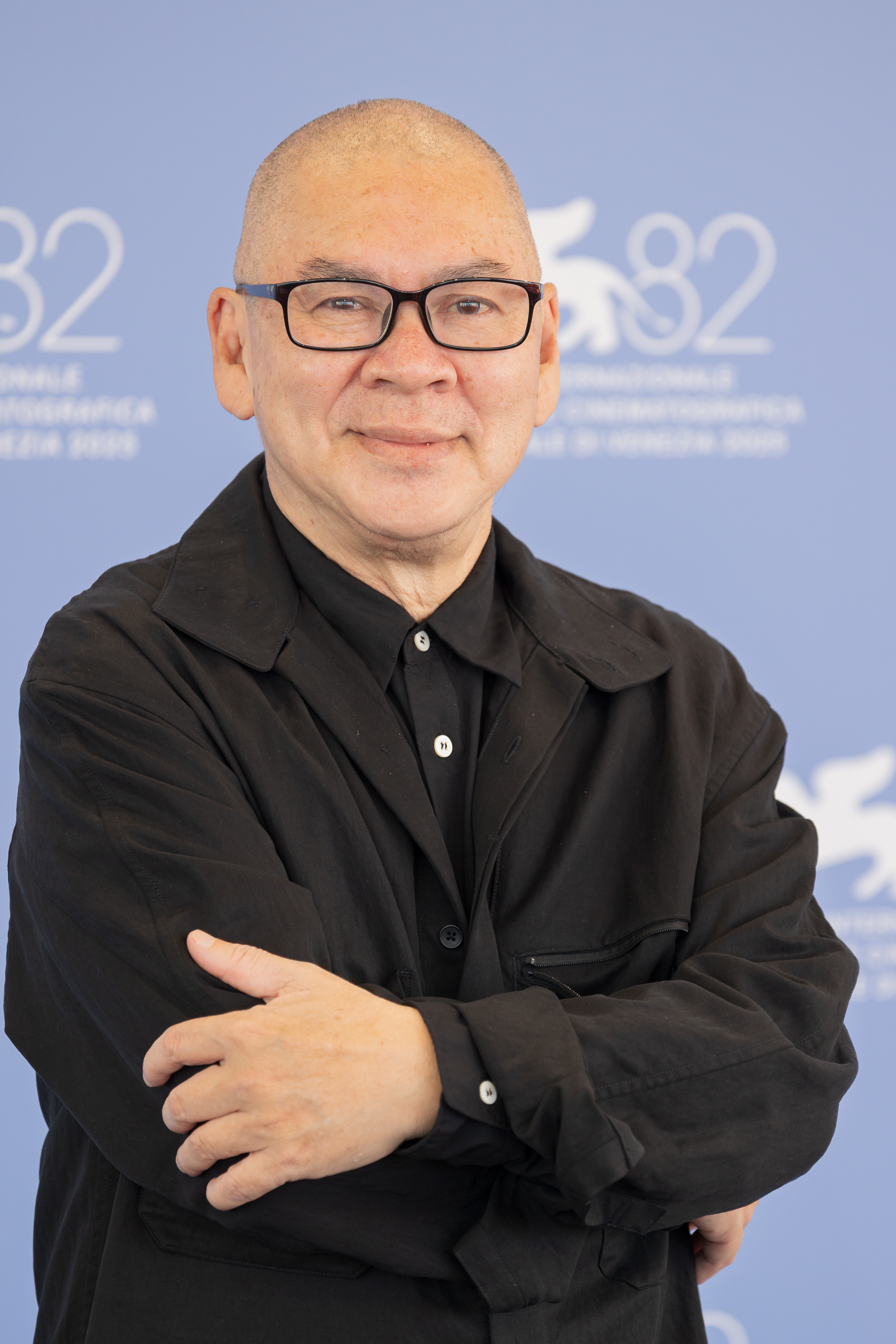
- Tsai in 2025
- Born: 27 October 1957 (age 68); Kuching, Crown Colony of Sarawak, British Empire (present-day Sarawak, Malaysia)
- Education: Chinese Culture University (BA)
- Occupations: Film director, screenwriter
- Years active: 1989–present
- Awards: Venice Film Festival – Golden Lion; 1994 – Vive L'Amour; Grand Jury Prize; 2013 – Stray Dogs Berlin Film Festival; Silver Bear; 1997 – The River Golden Horse Awards – Best Feature Film; 1994 – Vive L'Amour; Best Director; 1994 – Vive L'Amour; 2013 – Stray Dogs

Chinese name
- Chinese: 蔡明亮
- Hanyu Pinyin: Cài Míngliàng

Tsai Ming-liang (Chinese: 蔡明亮; born 27 October 1957) is a Malaysian filmmaker based in Taiwan and one of the most celebrated directors in the Slow Cinema genre and the "Second New Wave" of Taiwanese cinema.

Tsai has written and directed 11 feature films and many short films and television films. He is best known for his feature films Vive L'Amour (1994, for which he won the Golden Lion), The River (1997), Goodbye, Dragon Inn (2003) and Stray Dogs (2013). All of his productions star Lee Kang-sheng.

== Early life ==
Tsai was born in Malaysia. He is of Chinese descent, born to Hakka Chinese farmers, and spent his first 20 years in Kuching, Sarawak, after which he moved to Taipei, Taiwan. This, he said, had "a huge impact on [his] mind and psyche". "Even today", Tsai has said, "I feel I belong neither to Taiwan nor to Malaysia. In a sense, I can go anywhere I want and fit in, but I never feel that sense of belonging."

Tsai graduated from the Drama and Cinema Department of the Chinese Culture University of Taiwan in 1982 and worked as a theatrical producer, screenwriter, and television director in Hong Kong. From 1989 to 1991, he directed several telefilms. One of these, Boys, starred his muse, Lee Kang-sheng.

== Career ==
=== 1990s ===
Tsai's first feature film was Rebels of the Neon God (1992). A film about troubled youth in Taipei, it starred Lee as the character Hsiao-Kang. Lee went on to appear in all of Tsai's feature films as of 2023. Tsai's second feature, Vive L'Amour (1994), is about three people who unknowingly share an apartment. The film is slow-paced, has little dialogue, and is about alienation; all of these became Tsai's trademarks. Vive L'Amour was critically acclaimed and won the Golden Horse Awards for best picture and best director.

Tsai's next film was The River (1997), in which a family has to deal with the son's neck pain. The family is similar to one that appears in Rebels of the Neon God and is played by the same three actors. The Hole (1998) is about two neighbors in an apartment. It features several musical numbers.

=== 2000s ===
In Tsai's next film, What Time Is It There? (2001), a man and a woman meet in Taipei before the woman travels to Paris. This was Tsai's first film to star Chen Shiang-chyi, who starred in his next few films alongside Lee. Goodbye, Dragon Inn (2003) is about people inside an old cinema that is closing down. For this film, Tsai included even longer shots and fewer lines of dialogue than in previous films, a trend that continued in his later work. The Wayward Cloud (2005) is a sequel to What Time Is It There? in which Hsiao-Kang and Shiang-chyi meet again and start a relationship while Hsiao-Kang works as a pornographic film actor. This film, like The Hole, features several musical numbers.

Tsai's next film, I Don't Want to Sleep Alone (2006), was his first set in Malaysia and is about two different characters, both played by Lee. In 2007, the Malaysian Censorship Board banned the film based on incidents shown depicting the country "in a bad light" for cultural, ethical, and racial reasons, but later allowed it to be screened in the country after Tsai agreed to censor parts of the film according to the board's requirements. Tsai's next film, Face (2009), is about a Taiwanese director who travels to France to shoot a film.

=== 2010–present ===
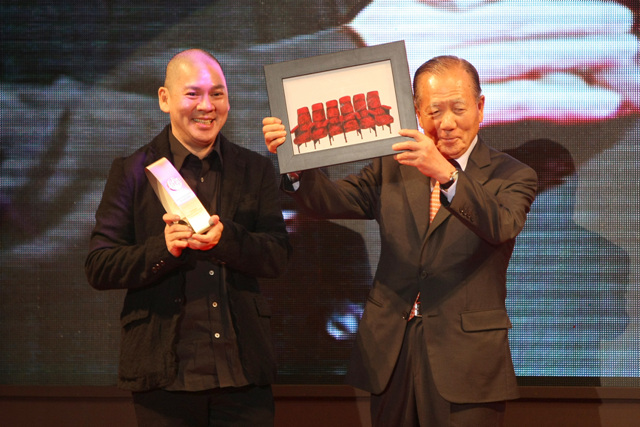
Tsai (left) was named Asian Filmmaker of the Year at the 2010 Busan International Film Festival.

Tsai's next feature film was Stray Dogs (2013), about a homeless family.

Most of Tsai's output in the 2010s was dedicated to his exhibition films, in particular the Walker series (2012–24), the subject of which was a monk played by Lee who travels by walking slowly, usually surrounded by a busy background.

In 2020, Tsai released Days, which competed for the Golden Bear at the Berlinale film festival.

In 2021, Tsai released Wandering, a short installation film with no dialogue, which follows a woman visiting an exhibition of Tsai's "Walker" series in Taiwan.

In December 2024, Tsai made his Australian in-person debut at an "In Conversation" event at the Australian Cinémathèque, Gallery of Modern Art (GOMA) in Brisbane. This event coincides with a special retrospective of Tsai's work as part of QAGOMA's Asia Pacific Triennial of Contemporary Art.

=== Honours ===
Tsai's honours include a Golden Lion (best picture) for Vive L'Amour at the 51st Venice International Film Festival; the Silver Bear – Special Jury Prize for The River at the 47th Berlin International Film Festival; the FIPRESCI award for The Hole at the 1998 Cannes Film Festival; and the Alfred Bauer Prize and Silver Bear for Outstanding Artistic Achievement for The Wayward Cloud at the 55th Berlin International Film Festival; the Grand Jury Prize at the 70th Venice International Film Festival for Stray Dogs. In 1995, he was a member of the jury at the 45th Berlin International Film Festival.

In 2003, The Guardian voted Tsai No. 18 of the 40 best directors in the world. In 2014, he was named an officer of the Order of Arts and Letters by the government of France.

== Personal life ==
Tsai is openly gay and has incorporated queer themes into his films. Since 2021, he has lived in the mountainous Xindian District of New Taipei City, where he partially renovated an abandoned apartment complex constructed in 1973 under the guidance of Jiang Changwen, a then-prominent Taiwanese actor and media personality. Much of the complex remains in disrepair. Tsai shares his living spaces with his long-term collaborator, Lee Kang-sheng, in a platonic relationship. They occupy only a small part of the development and are the last remaining residents on that road. Tsai's 2017 film The Deserted was largely shot at his residence.

Tsai is an avid painter, having taking up the hobby during the COVID-19 pandemic.

== Filmography ==
=== Feature films ===
Year	English title	Original title	Notes/Ref.
1992	Rebels of the Neon God	青少年哪吒	
1994	Vive l'amour	愛情萬歲	Golden Lion winner
1997	The River	河流	
1998	The Hole	洞	
2001	What Time Is It There?	你那邊幾點	
2003	Goodbye, Dragon Inn	不散	
2005	The Wayward Cloud	天邊一朵雲	
2006	I Don't Want to Sleep Alone	黑眼圈	
2009	Face	臉	
2013	Stray Dogs	郊遊	
2020	Days	日子	

=== Documentaries ===
Year	Title
2008	Sleeping on Dark Waters
2015	Nà gè xià wu [That Afternoon, aka Afternoon]
2018	Your Face
2025	Back Home

=== "Walker" series ===
Year	English Title
2012	No Form
2012	Walker
2012	Diamond Sutra
2012	Sleepwalk
2013	Walking on Water
2014	Journey to the West
2015	No No Sleep
2018	Sand
2022	Where
2024	Abiding Nowhere
2026	Dust

=== Other exhibition works ===
Year	Title
2001	Fish, Underground (or A Conversation with God)
2002	The Skywalk Is Gone
2008	Madame Butterfly– part of the Lucca Film Festival project "Twenty Puccini"
2015	Xiao Kang
2017	The Deserted
2019	Light
2021	Màn bù jīng xīn [Casually] [aka Wandering]
2021	Liang ye bu neng liu / The Night
2021	The Moon and the Tree
2022	Where do you stand, Tsai Ming-Liang?

=== Segments ===
Year	Title	Notes/Ref.
2004	Welcome to São Paulo	"Aquarium"
2007	To Each His Own Cinema	"It's a Dream"
2012	Beautiful 2012	"Walker"
2013	Letters from the South	"Walking on Water"
2015	Beautiful 2015	"No No Sleep"

=== TV films ===
Year	Title
1989	Endless Love
1989	The Happy Weaver
1989	Far Away
1989	All Corners of the World
1990	Li Hsiang's Love Line
1990	My Name is Mary
1990	Ah-Hsiung's First Love
1991	Give Me a Home
1991	Boys
1991	Hsio Yueh's Dowry
1995	My New Friends

=== Casting ===
Tsai frequently recasts actors he has worked with on previous films:

Actor	Rebels of the Neon God (1992)	Vive L'Amour (1994)	The River (1997)	The Hole (1998)	What Time Is It There? (2001)	Goodbye, Dragon Inn (2003)	The Wayward Cloud (2005)	I Don't Want to Sleep Alone (2006)	Face (2009)	Stray Dogs (2013)	Days (2020)
Lee Kang-sheng	✓	✓	✓	✓	✓	✓	✓	✓	✓	✓	✓
Lu Yi-ching	✓	✓	✓		✓		✓		✓	✓	
Yang Kuei-mei		✓	✓	✓		✓	✓		✓	✓	
Chen Shiang-chyi			✓		✓	✓	✓	✓	✓	✓	
Chen Chao-jung	✓	✓	✓		✓	✓			✓		
Miao Tien	✓		✓	✓	✓	✓					
Norman Atun								✓	✓		
