= Goodbye, Dragon Inn =

2003 film by Tsai Ming-liang

- North American release poster
- Chinese: 不散
- Literal meaning: No leaving
- Hanyu Pinyin: Bú sàn
- Directed by: Tsai Ming-liang
- Written by: Tsai Ming-liang; Sung Hsi (additional narrative)
- Produced by: Hung-Chih Liang; Vincent Wang
- Starring: Lee Kang-sheng; Chen Shiang-chyi; Kiyonobu Mitamura
- Cinematography: Liao Pen-Jung
- Edited by: Chen Sheng-chang
- Distributed by: Homegreen Films
- Release date: December 12, 2003
- Running time: 81 minutes
- Country: Taiwan
- Languages: Mandarin; Taiwanese
- Box office: $1 million

Goodbye, Dragon Inn (Chinese: 不散) is a 2003 Taiwanese comedy-drama slow cinema film written and directed by Tsai Ming-liang. It shows the staff and patrons of a dying movie theater, which screens the 1967 wuxia film Dragon Inn as its final performance.

== Title ==
The Chinese title, "不散", is literally translated as "No leaving" or "Don't scatter." However, the title of the film references the Chinese idiom "不见不散", which is loosely translated as "I'll wait for you" or "I won't leave until I see you." The same year, Tsai produced the film 不见, which was translated as "The Missing" (not to be confused with the other 2003 film The Missing); Goodbye, Dragon Inn actor Lee Kang-sheng directed the film, and Miao Tien appears in both films. In addition, several years before the film's release, a Chinese comedy film was released under the full name "不见不散", which was translated into English as "be there or be square".

== Plot ==
The Fu He Grand Theater is a run-down movie palace in Taipei. The roof leaks, the toilets are dirty, and the theater appears to have only two full-time employees, a male projectionist and a female ticket attendant. It is implied that the theater is primarily known as a gay cruising spot (which it was in real life). On its last day of business, the proprietors choose to screen King Hu's 1967 classic Dragon Inn. (Note: In 2016, academic Elizabeth Wijaya visited the now-abandoned theater, which still had props from the film. The props indicated that on the final day of screening, the two films in the theater were Dragon Inn and Michelangelo Antonioni's L'Avventura.) Almost nobody is in attendance, and there is no fanfare for the occasion.

The ticket attendant slowly limps through the hallways to give the projectionist a steamed bun. When she arrives in the projection room, the projectionist has temporarily left. She waits for him and thinks about leaving the bun on the table for him, but eventually takes it and walks away.

A Japanese tourist attempts to cruise in the theater and the men's toilets. Although he meets some men, he is unsuccessful. He follows Chen Chao-jung to a storage room and silently requests a light for his cigarette. Chen tells him the theater is haunted. The tourist propositions him for sex, but Chen declines.

Back in the nearly empty auditorium, a female patron sits two rows behind the tourist, who gave up on cruising and returned to watching the movie. She rests her legs over the backrest of the empty seat in front of her but drops her shoe, climbs over the seat, and crawls to the seat right behind the tourist. Startled by the sound of her eating sunflower seeds behind him, he rises, stumbles, and hurriedly leaves the theater. The camera rests on the virtually static scene for almost two more minutes.

As Dragon Inn builds up to its climax, the film shifts to Miao Tien and Shih Chun, two actors from the original Dragon Inn film, who are watching the final screening. Miao visits with his grandson. Shih's eyes well up with tears.

After the film ends, the ticket attendant dutifully turns on the lights and sweeps the floor. When she is done, the camera stays on the rows of empty seats of theater, again for about two minutes. Miao and Shih recognize each other in the lobby and talk about how nobody goes to the movies or remembers them anymore.

The projectionist and ticket attendant close up the theater for the night. They rewind the film, take out the trash, and empty the rain buckets, even though the theater will never open again. They spend much of this time lost in thought. The ticket attendant stares at a poster saying "Temporarily out of business" and gives her booth one last look before walking away. She leaves half of the steamed bun for the projectionist. From the shadows, she wistfully watches the projectionist drive away, bun in hand. She then walks home by herself in the rain.

== Cast ==
- Lee Kang-sheng as the projectionist
- Chen Shiang-chyi as the ticket woman
- Mitamura Kiyonobu as the Japanese tourist
- Shih Chun as himself
- Miao Tien as himself
- Chen Chao-jung as himself
- Yang Kuei-mei as the peanut-eating woman

== Production ==
In his prior film, What Time is it There?, Tsai set a scene in the old Fu-Ho theater at the edge of Taipei. Reminded of the super-cinemas and the poetic King Hu films of his youth, he shot a scene in the theater and premiered the film there. After the premiere, Tsai approached the owner to shoot an entire film there, fearing the soon-to-close theater would be lost forever. What was envisioned as a short soon turned into a feature due to the long takes.

== Release ==
A 4K restoration was released on DVD and Blu-ray by Second Run on November 23, 2020, and digitally by Metrograph on December 18, 2020.

In 2025, the film was showcased in the section 'Decisive Moments in Asian Cinema' at the 30th Busan International Film Festival, as part of the special "Asian Cinema 100", being the signature work of the director Tsai Ming-liang.

== Reception ==
On review aggregator website Rotten Tomatoes, Goodbye, Dragon Inn has an approval rating of 81% based on 44 reviews, with an average rating of 7.30/10. The website's critical consensus reads, "Deliberately paced yet absorbing, Goodbye, Dragon Inn offers an affectionate—and refreshingly unique—look at a fading theater that should strike a chord with cineastes." Metacritic, which uses a weighted average, assigned the film a score of 83 out of 100, based on 16 critics, indicating "universal acclaim". A. O. Scott of The New York Times praised the film, writing, "Goodbye, Dragon Inn has a quiet, cumulative magic, whose source is hard to identify. Its simple, meticulously composed frames are full of mystery and feeling; it's an action movie that stands perfectly still." J. Hoberman of The Village Voice also liked the film: "And because Tsai is the director, Goodbye, Dragon Inn is also a movie of elegant understatement and considerable formal intelligence."

Tsai considers it one of his best films and chose it as one of his entries of the 10 greatest films of all time in the 2012 Sight & Sound Directors' Poll. Directors Monte Hellman and Apichatpong Weerasethakul also voted for it in that poll. In 2020, Weerasethakul called Goodbye, Dragon Inn "THE best film of the last 125 years". The film won several awards, including the FIPRESCI Prize at the 60th Venice International Film Festival and the Best Feature Gold Plaque at the Chicago International Film Festival.

In July 2025, it was one of the films voted for the "Readers' Choice" edition of The New York Times' list of "The 100 Best Movies of the 21st Century," finishing at number 270.
