= Yang Kuei-mei =

Taiwanese actress

- 楊貴媚
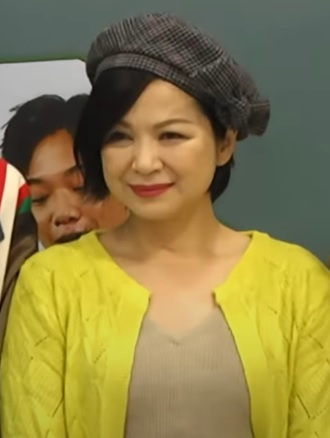
- Yang in March 2020
- Born: 6 September 1959 (age 67); Wanhua, Taipei, Taiwan
- Other name: Yang Guimei
- Occupations: Actress; television host
- Years active: 1980–present

Chinese name
- Traditional Chinese: 楊貴媚
- Simplified Chinese: 杨贵媚
- Hanyu Pinyin: Yáng Guìmèi
- Hokkien POJ: Iûⁿ Kùi-bī
- Tâi-lô: Iûnn Kuì-bī

Yang Kuei-mei (Chinese: 楊貴媚; Pe̍h-ōe-jī: Iûⁿ Kùi-bī; born 6 September 1959) is a Taiwanese actress and television host. She has had starring roles in Eat Drink Man Woman, Vive L'Amour, and The Hole.

Yang has received several awards and a lot of nominations for her acting. She was named Best Asian Actress at the 1999 Singapore International Film Festival for The Hole ("For the subtlety and sophistication of her performance in the role of a woman determined to hurdle the stresses of urban life"). She also won the Best Actress award at the 2004 Golden Horse Film Festival for her role in The Moon Also Rises. She won Golden Bell Awards Best Leading Actress in a Television Series for Heaven Loves Good Men in 1999. In 2023, Yang holds the record for the most Best Performance awards winner at the Singapore International Film Festival after winning it four times.

== Filmography ==
=== Film ===
Year	English title	Original title	Role	Notes
1980	Everlasting Chivalry	俠影留香		
1980	Another Spring	又見春天		alternative title: Once Again with Love
1986	Wu Fu Qian Sui Yu Ying Zi Gong	五府千歲與嬰仔公		
1986	Feng Kuang Da Zuo Xiu	瘋狂大作秀		
1988	Gunman from Nowhere	轟天雙雄		
1988	Strawman	稻草人	Wide mouth's wife	
1988	The Green Trees	校樹青青		
1988	My Beloved	媽媽再愛我一次		
1989	We Are in the Same Boat	咱們都是台灣人		
1990	Hua Ji	花祭		
1992	Hill of No Return	無言的山丘	A-jou	
1994	Lonely Hearts Club	寂寞芳心俱樂部		
1994	Eat Drink Man Woman	飲食男女	Chu Chia-chen	
1994	Vive L'Amour	愛情萬歲	May Lin	
1995	Sun Valley	日光峽谷	Hong Liu	
1995	Modern Republic	摩登共和國		
1996	Tonight Nobody Goes Home	今天不回家	Qin Zhen	
1996	In a Strange City	在陌生的城市	Jane Yu	
1997	The River	河流	Girl in hotel	
1998	A Little Life-Opera	一生一台戲 / 一生愛著戲	Xueyan	
1998	The Hole	洞	The woman downstairs	
2000	100 Reasons for Loving You	愛你的一百個理由		
2002	Double Vision	雙瞳	Coroner	
2002	Robinson's Crusoe	魯濱遜漂流記	Billie	
2003	Goodbye, Dragon Inn	不散	Peanut-eating woman	
2004	The Moon Also Rises	月光下，我記得	Chen Pao-chai	
2005	The Wayward Cloud	天邊一朵雲	News presenter	
2005	Moonlight in Tokyo	情義我心知	Yan	
2005	The Fire Ball	紅孩兒:決戰火焰山	Princess Fan	Voice
2005	Blue Cha Cha	深海		
2006	The Knot	雲水謠	Xu Fengniang	
2007	Pleasure Factory	快樂工廠	Linda	
2008	Detours to Paradise	歧路天堂	Fei Man-guan	
2009	Face	臉		
2009	Young Spirit of a Taiwanese Opera Singer	青春歌仔		Television
2009	Our Island, Our Dreams	星月無盡	Huang Te-yue	
2012	Love	愛	Mark's mother	
2013	Stray Dogs	郊遊	Woman	
2014	Lion Dancing	鐵獅玉玲瓏		
2014	Taipei Factory II: Alla scoperta di Taipei	臺北工廠 II		segment "The Thrill is Gone"
2014	The Crossing	太平輪	Yan's mother	Part 1 & Part 2
2015	Jupiter's Choice	愛神卡拉OK	Hsueh Hung	Television
2015	Love You So	牡丹		Short film
2016	A Trip with Mom	親旅行		Short film
2016	Summer Wind	夏風		Television
2017	The Mad King of Taipei	西城童話	Wu Kuei-mei	
2017	Hanky Panky	大釣哥	Pai Hsiu-chuan	
2017	Damn Mother	媽的！一百種死法	A-man	Short film
2020	Tigertail	—N/a	Minghua	
2020	The Silent Forest	無聲	Principal	
2024	Yen and Ai-Lee	小雁與吳愛麗	Ai-Lee	
2025	Double Happiness	雙囍	Carina Bai	

=== Television series ===
Year	English title	Original title	Role	Notes
	Needle and Thread	針線情		
	Duo Qing Cuo	多情厝		
	Lily of the Valley	火中蓮		
	Women's Story	女人的故事之旅情		
	Chocolate	濃情巧克力		
1984	Ku Xin Lian	苦心蓮	Kuo Yu-chun	
1989	Golden Chair	金交椅	Chu Piao-hung	
1990	Reincarnated Flower	再生花		
1991	Two Moons	兩個月亮		
1991	Career Master	草地狀元		
1992	Liang Ren	良人		
1993	The Journey Toward Blessings	路長情更長	Ou Mei-yi	
1998	Ai Ni Ru Gu	愛你入骨		
2002	Everlasting Smile	永遠的微笑	Lin's mother	
2003	Great Love on the Street	大愛一條街		
2003	Quartet	四重奏	Chen Mei-yue	
2007	Stars Know My Heart 2007	星星知我心2007	Lin Ming-yu	
2008	I Do?	幸福的抉擇	Fu Ming-chu	
2009	The Grass Green Sky	芳草碧連天	Kao Chen A-wang	
2011	Taste of Happiness	人間渡系列-幸福的滋味	Kuo Tsai A-min	
2011	Facing Life with a Smile	微笑面對	Hou Mei-ying	
2012	Dong Men Si Shao	東門四少	Chu Piao-hsiang	
2012	Home	回家	Su-liao Ching-mei	
2012	Alice in Wonder City	給愛麗絲的奇蹟	Lisa King	
2014	Sun After the Rain	雨後驕陽	Chin Mu-dan	
2014	Brave Lover	加油愛人	Lin Shu-yuan	
2016	Where the Heart Belongs	歸·娘家	Wu Chia-lin	
2016	Life List	遺憾拼圖	Yu Chiu-lan	
2016	Reborn from the Dust	蘇足	Su Zu (middle-aged)	
2017	Go Home	企業戰士回家記	Chao An-pang's wife	
2017	She's Family	媽媽不見了	Chen Chin-hsiu	
2020	April Rain	四月望雨-月夜愁	Older Lin Li-ru	
2022	Witty Wu Zhao	天下第一招	Yang Wu-zhao	
2022	Women in Taipei	台北女子圖鑑		
2023	Living	有生之年	Chen Li-ying	
2024	Born for the Spotlight	影后		

=== Variety and reality show ===
Year	English title	Original title	Notes
2019	Three Piglets	阮三个	Host
2020	Three Piglets 2	阮三个2	Host
2022	Travel Together with Stars Family	花甲少年趣旅行	Host; season 1
2022	Three Piglets 3	阮三个3	Host
2022	Hey Girls, Adventure!	老少女奇遇記	Host, executive producer

== Awards and nominations ==
Year	Award	Category	Nominated work	Result
1992	29th Golden Horse Awards	Best Actress	Hill of No Return	Nominated
1993	Singapore International Film Festival	Best Actress	Hill of No Return	Won
1995	Singapore International Film Festival	Best Actress	Vive L'Amour	Won
1998	35th Golden Horse Awards	Best Actress	The Hole	Nominated
1999	Singapore International Film Festival	Best Actress	The Hole	Won
1999	34th Golden Bell Awards	Best Leading Actress in a Television Series	Heaven Loves Good Men	Won
2002	39th Golden Horse Awards	Best Actress	Robinson's Crusoe	Nominated
2004	41st Golden Horse Awards	Best Actress	The Moon Also Rises	Won
2004	39th Golden Bell Awards	Best Leading Actress in a Television Series	Quartet	Nominated
2004	Asia-Pacific Film Festival	Best Supporting Actress	Goodbye, Dragon Inn	Won
2010	15th Asian Television Awards	Best Actress	The Grass Green Sky	Nominated
2017	52nd Golden Bell Awards	Best Leading Actress in a Television Series	Life List	Nominated
2017	52nd Golden Bell Awards	Best Supporting Actress in a Miniseries or Television Film	She's Family	Nominated
2018	22nd Asian Television Awards	Best Actress in a Supporting Role	She's Family	Won
2019	54th Golden Bell Awards	Best Host in a Reality or Game Show	Three Piglets	Nominated
2019	23rd Asian Television Awards	Best Actress in a Leading Role	The Mad King of Taipei Town	Nominated
2020	55th Golden Bell Awards	Best Host in a Reality or Game Show	Three Piglets 2	Nominated
2022	57th Golden Bell Awards	Best Host in a Reality or Game Show	Three Piglets 3	Won
2023	34th Singapore International Film Festival	Best Performance	A Journey in Spring	Won
2024	26th Taipei Film Festival	Best Actress	A Journey in Spring	Nominated
2024	35th Singapore International Film Festival	Screen Icon Award	—N/a	Honored
2024	59th Golden Bell Awards	Best Leading Actress in a Television Series	Living	Won
2024	61st Golden Horse Awards	Best Supporting Actress	Yen and Ai-Lee	Won
2025	18th Asian Film Awards	Best Supporting Actress	Yen and Ai-Lee	Won
2025	27th Taipei Film Festival	Best Supporting Actress	Yen and Ai-Lee	Won
2026	61st Golden Bell Awards	Best Leading Actress in a Television Series	The World Between Us: After The Flames	Won
