= Jane Liao =

Taiwanese actress

- 廖慧珍
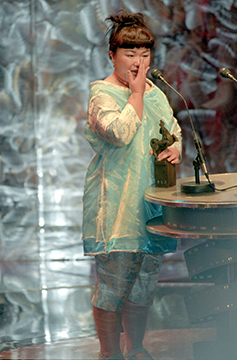
- Liao in December 1997
- Born: Liao Hui-jen; Taiwan
- Occupation: Actress
- Years active: 1997–present

Jane Liao Hui-jen (Chinese: 廖慧珍) is a Taiwanese actress best known for her role as Lily Wu in Love Go Go (1997), which earned her Best Supporting Actress in the 34th Golden Horse Awards. She has also starred in the films Help Me Eros (2007), and On Happiness Road (2017), as well as television series Two Fathers (2013), My Goddess (2018), and The Arc of Life (2021).

== Early life and education ==
Liao grew up in Hengchun, Pingtung County, with two older brothers. She was predisposed to being overweight due to genes and polyendocrine metabolic ovarian syndrome (PMOS). Despite trying various sports during her school years, most notably tennis, where she served as her university's tennis club president, she was unable to lose weight. Liao's father managed one of the only two cinemas in Hengchun, and she described her family in early years as "wealthy". During her childhood, she was exposed to films while accompanying her father to work. To avoid shift work, her father later resigned and opened a hardware store, but the business failed when she was in junior high school, leading the family to face a financial crisis. Shortly afterward, her mother opened a lou mei restaurant. The restaurant, Qu Cun Rice Noodle Duck, is still operating in Hengchun and Liao returns to help run the store every Lunar New Year. Liao continued her studies in northern Taiwan and joined a film production company after graduation.

== Career ==
She landed her debut role as Lily Wu, one of the three protagonists and a food-guzzling roommate of Chen Ching-hsin's character, in the 1997 romantic comedy film Love Go Go. The role earning her Best Supporting Actress in the 34th Golden Horse Awards. She pursued a career as a character actress, often portraying overweight women, and landed the female lead role in the 2007 romance film Help Me Eros, as well as recurring roles in the 2011 and 2013 television series Sunny Happiness and Two Fathers. She then took on main roles in the 2015 drama series Be With Me, the 2016 family drama Smile is a Best Medicine, and the 2017 drama series Their Heaven. Liao went on to star in the 2016 romance film Welcome To The Happy Days and voice a lead character in the 2017 animated film On Happiness Road. Liao appeared as farmer Chen Yong-zheng in the 2018 romantic comedy series My Goddess and played a troublesome colleague May in the 2021 drama series The Arc of Life. She also secured supporting roles in the 2023 drama film Big and the 2024 romance film 18×2 Beyond Youthful Days.

== Filmography ==
=== Films ===
Year	Title	Role	Notes/Ref.
1997	Love Go Go	Lily Wu (吳莉莉)	
2007	Help Me Eros	Biscuit (小餅乾)	
2013	Zone Pro Site	Feast host	Cameo
2016	The Thin Blue Lines	The Landlord	
2016	Welcome To The Happy Days	Hsiao Rong-nu (蕭蓉女)	
2017	On Happiness Road	Chi's mother	
2023	Big	Horsie (馬馬)	
2024	18×2 Beyond Youthful Days	Shu-yi (淑宜)	

=== Television ===
Year	Title	Role	Notes/Ref.
2004	Taiwan Lilies	Hsiang Ping (項萍)	Recurring role
2010–2011	Lee's Family Reunion	Li Duo-mei (李多美)	Guest role
2011	Sunny Happiness	Fang Jin Wen (方金雯)	Recurring role
2011	Love You	Chuen's wife	Guest role
2012	The Woman Is Colored	Li Duo-wei (李多惠)	Recurring role
2013	Two Fathers	Jia Mei-nu (賈美女)	Recurring role
2015	Be With Me	Shi Zhe-ai (史喆愛)	Main role
2016	Smile is a Best Medicine	The Daughter-in-law	Main role
2017	Their Heaven	Ching Hsia (青霞)	Main role
2018	My Goddess	Chen Yong-zheng (陳永媜)	Recurring role
2021	The Arc of Life	May	Recurring role
2022	Shards of Her	Fang Mei-yin (方美茵)	Cameo

== Awards and nominations ==
Year	Award	Category	Work	Result	Ref.
1997	34th Golden Horse Awards	Best Supporting Actress	Love Go Go	Won	
