= Lee Kang-sheng =

Taiwanese actor, film director and screenwriter

- 李康生
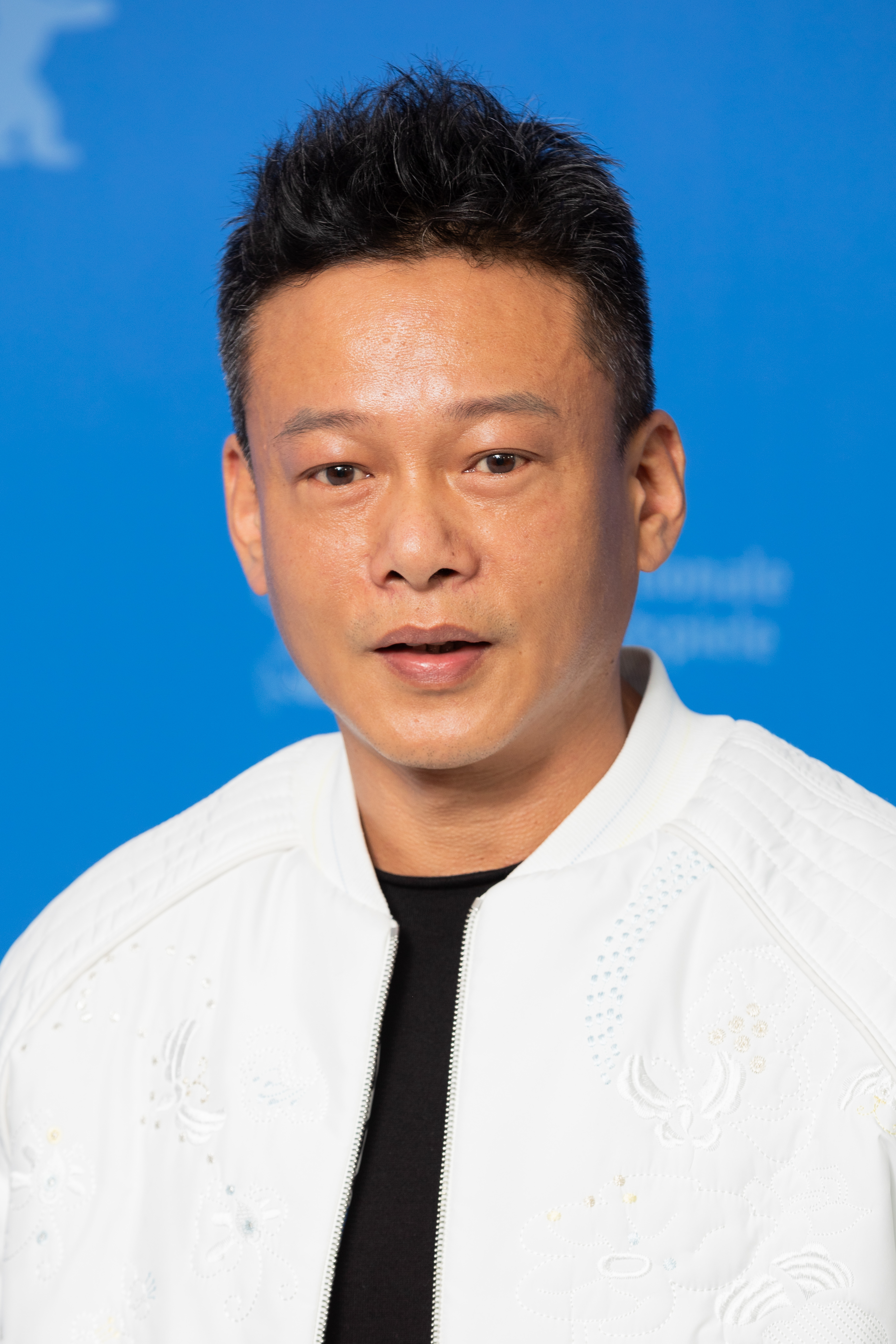
- Lee in 2020
- Born: October 21, 1968 (age 57); Taipei, Taiwan
- Occupations: Actor; film director; screenwriter
- Years active: 1989–present
- Awards: Golden Horse Awards – Best Actor; 2013 - Stray Dogs

Lee Kang-sheng (Chinese: 李康生; pinyin: Lǐ Kāngshēng; Pe̍h-ōe-jī: Lí Khong-seng; born 21 October 1968) is a Taiwanese actor, film director and screenwriter. He has appeared in all of Tsai Ming-liang's feature films. Lee's directorial efforts include The Missing in 2003 and Help Me Eros in 2007.

== Career ==
Lee was working at an arcade when he was asked by Tsai Ming-liang to act in his TV film Boys. This started a working relationship that has lasted over 30 years; Tsai has said that he would never make another movie without Lee.

=== Awards ===
Lee has received recognition for his acting by winning the Best Actor Award at the 2002 Cinemanila International Film Festival for What Time Is It There? and getting nominated for a Golden Horse Award in 1994 for Vive L'Amour.

Lee won several awards with his directorial debut, The Missing. At the 2004 Rotterdam International Film Festival, he won the KNF Award, the NETPAC Award and the Tiger Award. The film also won the New Currents Award at the 2004 Pusan International Film Festival, a special mention at the Ljubljana International Film Festival and the City of Athens Award at the Athens International Film Festival.

His second directorial effort, Help Me Eros in 2007, was nominated for a Golden Lion at the Venice Film Festival. It won a special jury award at the 2007 World Film Festival of Bangkok.

== Filmography ==
=== As actor ===
Year	Title	Role
1991	Boys	
1992	Rebels of the Neon God	Hsiao-kang
1994	Vive L'Amour	Hsiao-kang
1996	A Drifting Life	
1997	Sweet Degeneration	Chun-sheng
1997	The River	Hsiao-kang
1998	The Hole	The Man Upstairs
1999	Ordinary Heroes	Tung
2000	Sunny Doll	
2001	What Time Is It There?	Hsiao-kang
2002	A Way We Go	Ah Hui
2002	The Skywalk Is Gone (short)	Hsiao-kang
2003	Goodbye, Dragon Inn	Projectionist
2005	The Wayward Cloud	Hsiao-kang
2006	I Don't Want to Sleep Alone	Hsiao-kang
2007	Help Me Eros	Ah Jie
2009	Face	Kang, the director
2013	Stray Dogs	Hsiao-kang
2014	Journey to the West	Monk
2015	No No Sleep (short)	
2015	Sashimi	
2016	The Tenants Downstairs	Guo Li
2018	The Deserted	
2019	Your Face	
2020	Days	Kang
2022	The Rope Curse 2	Huo-ge
2023	Kuro no Ushi	
2024	Abiding Nowhere	
2024	Stranger Eyes	Lao Wu
2024	Blue Sun Palace	Cheung
2026	The House on the Moon	Yue Lao
2026	Fuxi: Joy in Four Chapters	

=== As screenwriter-director ===
Year	Title
2003	The Missing
2007	Help Me Eros
2009	Taipei 24H
