= The Wayward Cloud =

2005 film by Tsai Ming-liang

- Promotional release poster
- Traditional Chinese: 天邊一朵雲
- Simplified Chinese: 天边一朵云
- Literal meaning: one cloud on the horizon
- Hanyu Pinyin: tiānbiān yī duǒ yún
- Directed by: Tsai Ming-liang
- Written by: Tsai Ming-liang
- Produced by: Bruno Pésery
- Starring: Lee Kang-sheng; Chen Shiang-chyi
- Cinematography: Liao Pen-jung
- Edited by: Chen Sheng-chang
- Distributed by: 20th Century Fox
- Release date: March 18, 2005
- Running time: 112 minutes
- Country: Taiwan
- Language: Mandarin

The Wayward Cloud is a 2005 Taiwanese film directed by Tsai Ming-liang and starring Lee Kang-sheng and Chen Shiang-chyi.

== Plot ==
There is a water shortage in Taiwan, and watermelons are abundant. Television programs teach various water-saving methods and encourage the drinking of watermelon juice instead of water. Hsiao-kang, a pornographic actor, films sex scenes with watermelons and water. Shiang-chyi is a woman who lives nearby.

One day, while Shiang-chyi is out collecting water bottles, she sees watermelons in a river and takes a watermelon. She passes Hsiao-kang sleeping on a bench and uses his water bottle to wash her watermelon. She sits down on the bench across from him. He wakes up, and they realize that they know each other from when he was a watch salesman. She does not know that he now works in porn. The two start a relationship. She feeds him watermelon, they cook food together, and he smokes on the floor under her table. They go to a video store and make out in the adult film section.

Shiang-chyi finds an unconscious porn actress in an elevator. She helps a porn crew member take her to a room where they are filming. Hsiao-kang is there, and she is upset to see him working in porn. The crew films Hsiao-kang raping the unconscious woman, and Shiang-chyi watches them. As Hsiao-kang climaxes, he pulls out of the unconscious woman and pushes his penis inside Shiang-chyi's mouth.

== Cast ==
- Lee Kang-sheng as Hsiao-kang
- Chen Shiang-chyi as Shiang-chyi
- Lu Yi-ching as Porn actress
- Yang Kuei-mei as Porn actress
- Sumomo Yozakura as Porn actress

== Production ==
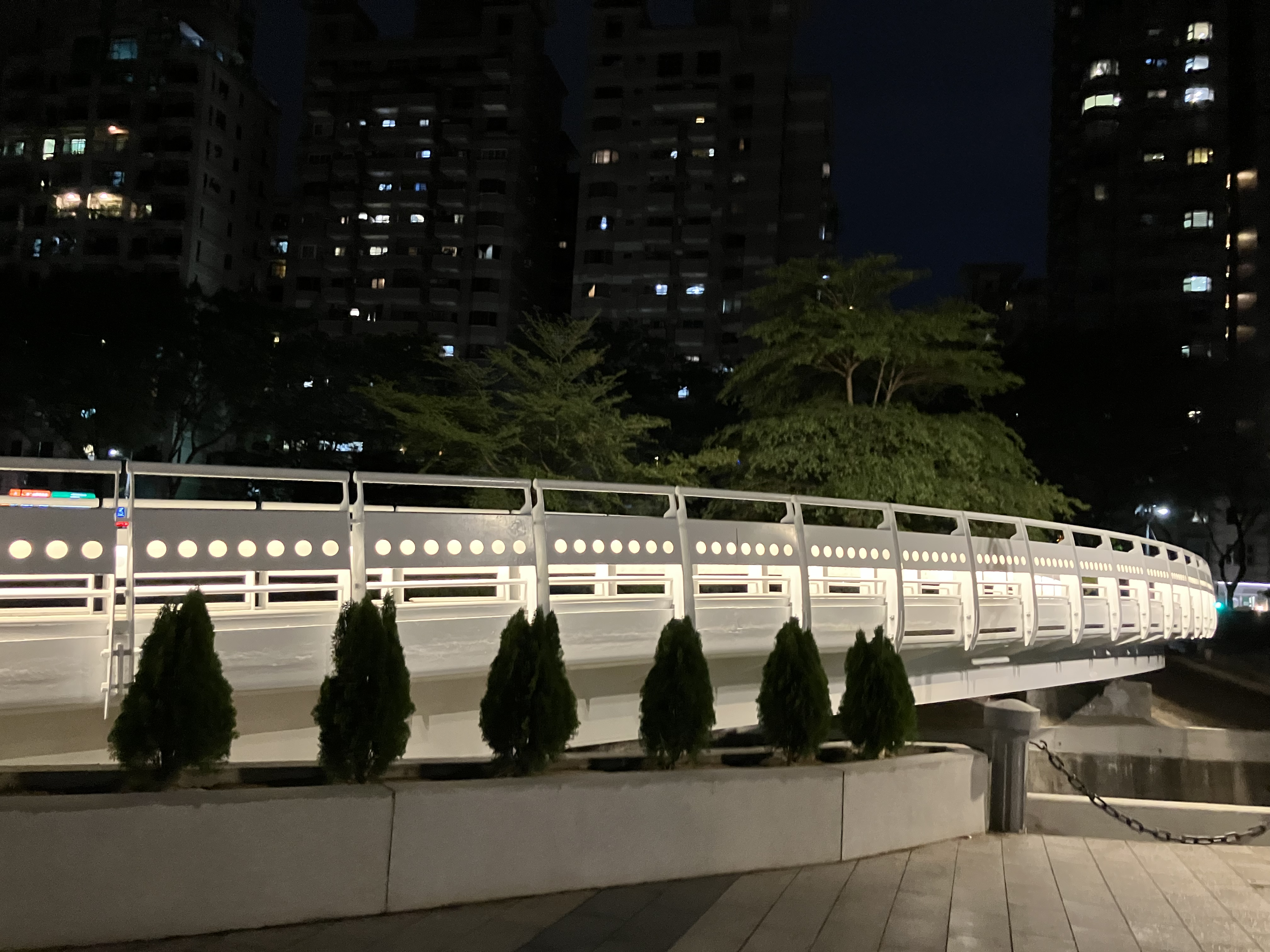
Bridge of Light, where some scenes of the film were shot.

This was the sequel to one of Tsai's previous films, What Time Is It There? The Wayward Cloud was filmed in Kaohsiung, Taiwan. It was shot in various landmark locations in the area, including Dragon and Tiger Pagodas and Love River.

== Release ==
The film grossed more than NT$20 million in its theatrical release in Taiwan; it was a big commercial achievement for the Taiwan film industry since most Taiwan films' ticket sales totaled under NT$1 million at the time. It has a 78% rating on Rotten Tomatoes based on 27 reviews, with a weighted average of 6.96/10. The site's consensus reads: "The Wayward Cloud may baffle more literally minded viewers, but its surreal pleasures will resonate with fans of thoroughly unique cinema." The film was Taiwan's official entry for the 78th Academy Awards in the foreign-language category. It was released on DVD by Strand Home Video in 2008.

== Awards ==
- 55th Berlin International Film Festival (2005) - Silver Bear for Outstanding Artistic Contribution
