= Face (2009 film) =

- Film poster
- Traditional Chinese: 臉
- Simplified Chinese: 脸
- Literal meaning: face
- Hanyu Pinyin: liǎn
- Directed by: Tsai Ming-liang
- Written by: Tsai Ming-liang
- Produced by: Jacques Bidou
- Starring: Fanny Ardant; Laetitia Casta; Jean-Pierre Léaud; Lee Kang-sheng
- Cinematography: Liao Pen-jung
- Edited by: Jacques Comets
- Release date: May 23, 2009 (Cannes)
- Running time: 138 minutes
- Countries: Taiwan; France
- Languages: Mandarin Chinese; French

Face (Chinese: 臉 Liǎn; French: Visage) is a 2009 Taiwanese-French film written and directed by Tsai Ming-liang.

== Plot ==
Hsiao-Kang, a Taiwanese filmmaker, travels to France to shoot a film in the Louvre. As he is not fluent in French, the director encounters some difficulties. Then, he learns that his mother has died.

== Cast ==
- Fanny Ardant - The producer / Queen Herodias
- Laetitia Casta - The star / Salomé
- Jean-Pierre Léaud - Antoine / King Herode
- Lee Kang-sheng - Hsiao-Kang, the director
- Lu Yi-ching - Hsiao-Kang's mother
- Mathieu Amalric - Man in the bushes
- Nathalie Baye
- Samuel Ganes
- Olivier Martinaud
- Jeanne Moreau
- François Rimbau
- Norman Atun
- Chen Shiang-chyi
- Chen Chao-jung

== Background ==
Face was written and directed by Tsai Ming-liang. It is set in the Louvre, as the museum had invited Tsai to make a film there. The Louvre contributed 775,000 euros, which was around 20 percent of the entire budget. The film is also inspired by director François Truffaut, and the cast includes several actors who worked with Truffaut.

Face was described as a "meditation on the cinematic process." Like Tsai's other films, Face is about people who are incredibly alienated.

== Reception ==
Face has a 71% rating on Rotten Tomatoes. It was nominated for the Golden Palm at the 2009 Cannes Film Festival. According to Eric Kohn of Indiewire, the film's story is "a bit difficult to follow". He added that "on a visual level, however, it's undoubtedly the prettiest movie in the festival's main competition."
