= Miao Tien =

Chinese actor

- Born: Miao Yanlin; December 6, 1925; Tongshan District, Jiangsu, China
- Died: February 19, 2005 (aged 79); Taipei, Taiwan
- Occupation: Film actor
- Years active: 1966–2003
- Musical career
- Also known as: Miao Tian

Miao Tien (Chinese: 苗天, 6 December 1925 – 19 February 2005) was a Chinese film actor mostly active in Hong Kong and Taiwan.

== Biography ==
Miao graduated at the Teachers College in Xuzhou and was working as an elementary school teacher when the civil war erupted. He joined the National Revolutionary Army and after the Communist victory moved to Taiwan. He continued to work for the army, which assigned him to be an actor in educational films. In 1956 the authorities asked him to join the government-owned Central Motion Picture Corporation (CMPC), where he started a career as a professional actor. Miao was not particularly successful at CMPC and moved to the privately owned Union Film Company. There, he achieved success with martial arts films. By the end of his career, he had starred in more than 100 such films and had become a recognizable name in the field. He died of cancer in 2005.

== Selected filmography ==
- Du mei gui (1966)
- Dragon Inn (1967)
- Diao Chan yu Lu Bu (1967)
- The Swordsman of All Swordsmen (1968) – Chou Fu
- Jiang hu ke (1969)
- Tie niang zi (1969)
- The Seisure Soul Sword of a Blind Girl (1970)
- Yin juan nu xia (1970)
- Lie huo (1970)
- Hei bai dao (1971)
- Shuang qiang Wang Ba Mei (1971)
- Xia yi shuang xiong (1971)
- Du hang da biao ke (1971)
- Duo ming jin jian (1971)
- Jian (1971)
- A Touch of Zen (1971)
- Zhui ming qiang (1971) – Prime Minister Sing Pa Tou
- Yi fu dang guan (1971)
- Wan li xiong feng (1971)
- Shi wan jin shan (1971)
- Long hu da jue dou (1971)
- Da sha xing (1971)
- Da mo ying xiong zhuan (1971) – Jiu Ching
- Ci man wang (1971)
- Da di long she (1972) – Tsao Ming Chiu
- Ba wang quan (1972)
- Yan zi Li San (1972)
- Tie san jiao (1972)
- Nu quan shi (1972)
- Ying peng ying (1972)
- The Bold Three (1972) – Boss Tiger Shih Hou
- Jiang hu nu er (1972)
- Bi hu you long (1972)
- Chao Zhou nu han (1973)
- Gan jin sha jue (1973)
- Qi sha jie (1973)
- Heng chong zhi zhuang nu sha xing (1973)
- Nu wang feng (1973) – Hsiung Yi Tien
- Shuang tian zhi zun (1973) – Lung, Casino Owner
- Ye hu (1973)
- Tu bo guo ji si wang xian (1973)
- Tie han jing hun (1973)
- Ying xiong bang (1974)
- Gui ma liang jin gang (1974)
- Hu wa er (1974)
- Zhu Jiang da feng bao (1974)
- Hei shou jin gang (1974)
- Wu long da zhui sha (1974)
- Hu dan zhui hun (1974)
- Guangdong hao han (1974)
- Da yin mou (1974)
- Da mo tian ling (1974)
- Chu zu zuo shou di ren (1974)
- Fei che long hu dou (1975)
- The Empress Dowager (1975) – Eunuch Li Lien-ying
- Da qian shi jie (1975)
- Pai an jing ji (1975)
- Qi mian ren (1975) – 1st leg
- Qiang yu hen (1975)
- Da jiang nan bei (1975) – Beret
- The Last Tempest (1976) – Li Lien Ying
- Ba dao lou zi (1976) – Hsi Yi
- Ba bai zhuang shi (1976)
- Ying lie qian qiu (1976)
- Bao biao (1976)
- Shaolin Wooden Men (1976)
- Hei long hui (1976)
- Fu chou zhe (1976)
- Feng yun ren wu (1977)
- Shui ling long (1977)
- Long she xia ying (1977)
- Jin luo han (1977)
- Leng yue gu xing jian wu qing (1977)
- Sheng jian feng yun (1977)
- Jiao jiao bing tuan (1977)
- Ren ba zhao (1977)
- Tuo gu gui jian lang yan (1977)
- Bai Yu Jing (1977)
- Snake & Crane Arts of Shaolin (1978) – Leader Gu
- Tian ya wei gui ren (1978)
- Yi zhao ban shi chuang jiang hu (1978) – Mr. Wan
- Zhan tian shan (1978)
- Bai zhan bao shan he (1978)
- Zhen bai she zhuan (1978)
- Yu qing ting (1978)
- Qi shi er sha xing (1978)
- You ling shen (1979)
- Du jiao he (1979)
- Xiang ye qi tan (1979)
- Hu tu fu xing chuang jiang hu (1979)
- Zui hou nu (1979)
- Mang han dou lao qian (1979)
- La shou xiao xi (1979)
- Jin yi wei (1979)
- Cheng gong ling shang (1979)
- Bi xue huang hua (1980)
- Di yu tian tang (1980)
- Cai yang nu bang zhu (1980) – Dragon Master
- You wo wu di (1980)
- Shi wan shan feng yun (1980)
- Ling ling wu shi (1980)
- Lang zi de yan lei (1980)
- Huang di yu tai jian (1981)
- Shou zhi ao chu (1981)
- Xin hai shuang shi (1981)
- Shen yong tu ji dui (1981)
- Tian ya guai ke yi zhen feng (1981)
- The Wandering Dragon (1981)
- Nu zei (1982) – Hu Chi
- Hei juan tao (1982)
- Jui gwai chat hung (1983)
- Tang Chao qi li nan (1985)
- Ninja Dragon (1986)
- Du mo (1991)
- Rebels of the Neon God (1992) – Father
- Sheng nu de yu wang (1993)
- Man hua wang (1996)
- Fei tian (1996)
- The River (1997) – Father
- San shi er li (1997)
- The Hole (1998) – A Shopper
- What Time Is It There? (2001) – Father
- Goodbye, Dragon Inn (2003) – Himself (final film role)
