= Chen Shiang-chyi =

Taiwanese actress

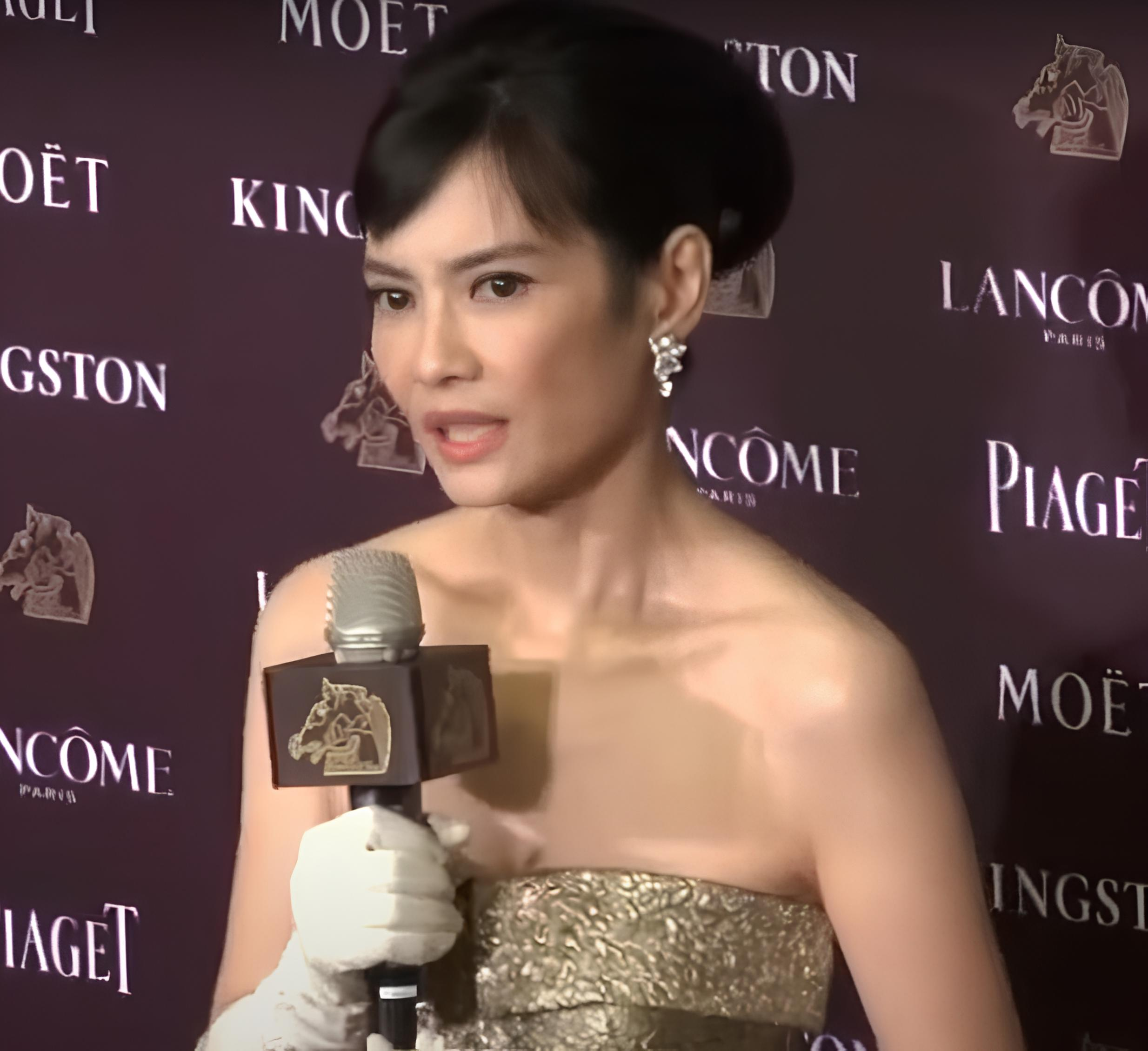
- Chen at the 51st Golden Horse Awards in November 2014
- Born: 27 November 1969 (age 56); Kaohsiung, Taiwan
- Occupations: Actress, director, and professor
- Years active: 1991–present
- Awards: Golden Horse Awards – Best Leading Actress; 2014 Exit

Chinese name
- Traditional Chinese: 陳湘琪
Transcriptions
Standard Mandarin
- Hanyu Pinyin: Chén Xiāngqí

Chen Shiang-chyi (Chinese: 陳湘琪; pinyin: Chén Xiāngqí; born 27 November 1969) is a Taiwanese actress who has starred in 24 different films since 1991. She is best known for her long-lasting collaboration with critically acclaimed film maker Tsai Ming-liang.

== Career ==
When she was studying at the Taipei National University of the Arts, Chen was spotted by Edward Yang when he walked by her acting class. She then appeared in two of Yang's films. After her performance in A Confucian Confusion, which was premiered in the competition section of the 1994 Cannes Film Festival, she decided to go to New York City to study performing arts. She graduated from the Educational Theatre master's program in the Department of Music and Performing Arts Professions at New York University.

After Chen returned to Taiwan, she had starring roles in many of Tsai Ming-liang's films. She also appeared in Lin Cheng-sheng's Sweet Degeneration (1997), which was entered into the 48th Berlin International Film Festival. In 2014, she won the Best Actress award at the Golden Horse Film Festival for her performance in Exit.

Chen teaches at the Taipei National University of the Arts as an assistant professor of theatre.

== Filmography ==
| Year | English title | Original title | Role | Director | Notes |
|---|---|---|---|---|---|
| 1991 | A Brighter Summer Day | 牯嶺街少年殺人事件 | Little doctor's fiancée | Edward Yang | |
| 1994 | A Confucian Confusion | 獨立時代 | Qiqi | Edward Yang | |
| 1997 | Yours and Mine | 我的神經病 | | Wang Shau-di | |
| 1997 | The River | 河流 | Girl | Tsai Ming-liang | |
| 1997 | Sexy Story | 浮世繪－捉姦 | | Ho Ping | Short |
| 1997 | Sweet Degeneration | 放浪 | | Lin Cheng-sheng | |
| 1998 | Restless | 夏日情動 | Lin Qing Qing | Jule Gilfillan | |
| 1999 | Half of Heaven | La Moitié du ciel | Anyi | Alain Mazars | |
| 2001 | What Time Is It There? | 你那邊幾點？ | Shiang-chyi | Tsai Ming-liang | |
| 2002 | Robinson's Crusoe | 魯賓遜漂流記 | Hsui-ling | Lin Cheng-sheng | |
| 2002 | The Skywalk Is Gone | 天橋不見了 | Shiang-chyi | Tsai Ming-liang | Short |
| 2002 | Southbound Swallow | 小雨之歌 | Li Yen | Lien Chin-hua | |
| 2003 | Goodbye, Dragon Inn | 不散 | Ticket woman | Tsai Ming-liang | Nominated - Golden Horse Award for Best Leading Actress |
| 2004 | Bear Hug | 擁抱大白熊 | Fang Chin | Wang Shau-di | |
| 2005 | The Wayward Cloud | 天邊一朵雲 | Shiang-chyi | Tsai Ming-liang | Nominated - Golden Horse Award for Best Leading Actress |
| 2006 | I Don't Want to Sleep Alone | 黑眼圈 | Coffee-shop waitress | Tsai Ming-liang | |
| 2008 | Farewell, Edward Yang | 再見，楊德昌 | | Hsiao Chu-chen | Documentary |
| 2008 | Sleeping on Dark Waters | 沉睡在黑水中 | | Tsai Ming-liang | Documentary |
| 2009 | Face | Visage / 臉 | | Tsai Ming-liang | |
| 2013 | Soul | 失魂 | Yun | Chung Mong-hong | |
| 2013 | Stray Dogs | 郊遊 | Woman | Tsai Ming-liang | |
| 2013 | Past Present | 昨天 | Herself | Tiong Guan Saw | Documentary |
| 2014 | Exit | 迴光奏鳴曲 | Ling-tzu | Chienn Hsiang | Golden Horse Award for Best Leading Actress; Taipei Film Award for Best Actress; Vesoul International Film Festival of Asian Cinema NETPAC Special Mention; Nominated - Chinese Film Media Award for Best Actress |
| 2014 | The Clearstream Affair | L'Enquête | Mme Yin | Vincent Garenq | |
| 2016 | The Receptionist | 接線員 | Sasa | Jenny Lu | Nominated - Golden Horse Award for Best Supporting Actress |
| 2017 | The Deserted: VR | 家在蘭若寺 | female ghost | Tsai Ming-liang | |
| 2018 | Your Face | 你的臉 | herself | Tsai Ming-liang | documentary film |
| 2021 | Increasing Echo | 修行 | Mrs. Yan | Chienn Hsiang | Nominated - Golden Horse Award for Best Leading Actress; Taipei Film Award for Best Actress |
