= Vive l'amour =

1994 Taiwanese New Wave romantic drama by Tsai Ming-Liang

- DVD cover

Chinese name
- Traditional Chinese: 愛情萬歲
- Simplified Chinese: 爱情万岁
- Literal meaning: Long live love
Transcriptions
Standard Mandarin
- Hanyu Pinyin: Àiqíng wànsuì
- Directed by: Tsai Ming-liang
- Written by: Tsai Ming-liang; Tsai Yi-chun; Yang Pi-ying
- Produced by: Chung Hu-pin; Hsu Li-kong
- Starring: Yang Kuei-mei; Lee Kang-sheng; Chen Chao-jung
- Cinematography: Liao Pen-jung; Lin Ming-kuo
- Edited by: Sung Shia-cheng
- Production company: Central Motion Pictures
- Distributed by: Central Motion Pictures
- Release date: 2 September 1994 (Venice)
- Running time: 118 minutes
- Country: Taiwan
- Language: Mandarin

Vive L'Amour (traditional Chinese: 愛情萬歲; simplified Chinese: 爱情万岁; pinyin: Àiqíng wànsuì; lit. 'long live love') is a 1994 Taiwanese New Wave romantic drama film directed by Tsai Ming-liang, starring Lee Kang-sheng, Yang Kuei-mei and Chen Chao-jung.

The film had its world premiere at the 51st Venice International Film Festival, where it won the Golden Lion, the festival's top prize.

While the film was widely critically acclaimed by most film critics and cinephiles when it was first released, its vague storyline, slow pace and cinematic techniques resulted in an average box office turnout.

== Plot ==
Hsiao-kang, a young salesman for commercial ossuaries, notices a key to a vacant apartment, forgotten by a real estate agent, dangling in its locks and promptly pockets it while no one else is around. He soon moves into one of the bedrooms. One night he attempts to commit suicide by slitting his wrists while lying on the bed, but gets distracted by a noise coming from another corner of the apartment.

Meanwhile, Ah-jung is having coffee at a food court when an attractive real estate agent, May Lin, sits at the table next to his. Intrigued after they share a glance, he follows her as she walks down the street. Lin catches on and eventually joins him. She leads him to a vacant apartment that she has on the market—the same apartment that Hsiao-kang is secretly staying in—and they have sex in one of the bedrooms. Hsiao-kang, who is contemplating suicide in another room, hears them and tries to stop the bleeding from his wrists.

Ah-jung steals the key to the apartment from May Lin and later returns with his belongings. He moves into one of the adjoining bedrooms. Hsiao-kang also goes to the apartment to spend the night, carrying a melon which he subsequently makes out with and uses as a bowling ball smashing the melon against a wall. Ah-jung and Hsiao-kang encounter each other in the apartment and have a short argument.

May Lin spends her day trying to sell property. While taking a break, she returns to the apartment when Hsiao-kang and Ah-jung are both there. The two sneak out quietly together and soon form a friendship.

One night, Hsiao-kang goes out for a walk and meets Ah-jung selling dresses on the street. May Lin walks past but does not notice them. Soon, Ah-jung joins her at a food stand and the two return to the apartment and sleep together in the same room as they did the first time. Unbeknownst to them, Hsiao-kang is hiding under the bed the entire time, masturbating himself as the bed creaks above him.

The next morning, May Lin gets dressed and leaves. Hsiao-kang lies next to the sleeping Ah-jung and kisses him before slowly pulling away. Lin goes to her car but cannot start it, so instead she walks on a path in the unfinished Daan Forest Park. She then sits down on a bench and starts to cry uncontrollably.

== Cast ==
- Yang Kuei-mei (楊貴媚) as May Lin – a real estate agent and a heavy smoker, who uses the empty apartment for sexual affairs. She brings Ah-hung to one of the properties she has been trying to sell and has sex with him.
- Lee Kang-sheng (李康生) as Hsiao-kang – a salesman for commercial ossuaries (納骨塔), who discovers an apartment key and secretly moves into the apartment.
- Chen Chao-jung (陳昭榮) as Ah-jung – a street vendor, who steals the key to the apartment May Lin brings him to and later moves into the apartment. Sharing the absurd life situations together, he forms a friendship with Hsiao-kang after having a quarrel with him at the apartment where they both secretly live in.
- Lu Yi-ching (陸弈靜) as a coffee shop owner (uncredited)

== Reception ==
Vive l'amour won the Golden Lion award at the 51st Venice International Film Festival. It also won three Golden Horse Awards, for Best Picture, Best Director, and Best Sound Effects, Tsai Ming-liang won Best Director among Edward Yang for A Confucian Confusion, Wong Kar-wai for Chungking Express, and Stanley Kwan for Red Rose White Rose. He received the award from Ang Lee and Tsui Hark. In his speech, Tsai humorously noted that the Golden Horse Awards has the highest number of jury members and is arguably the most difficult award to win.

On AllMovie, reviewer Jonathan Crow praised the film, writing that "[director Tsai Ming-liang] presents Taipei as a soulless, ultra-modern labyrinth where individuals cannot communicate other than in one-night stands or business transactions. The film's style is masterful in both economy and emotional power. With very long takes, little narrative tension, and almost no dialogue, the style reinforces the cold, alienating world in which the characters live."

On the review aggregator website Rotten Tomatoes, 86% of 14 critics' reviews are positive, with an average rating of 8/10. In the 2012 Sight & Sound polls it received two critics' votes and three directors' votes.

In a recent review following Vive l'amour's 2K restoration, Film Inquiry critic Lee Jutton praised, "Very few filmmakers portrays the hunger for human connection with as much humor and pathos as Tsai Ming-liang." She concluded her review with the note that, "Even when they are placed in the most absurd situations, Tsai Ming-liang's characters convey feelings so incredibly universal that it’s impossible to not relate to them. Vive L'Amour is one of the best and brightest examples of this; it's never looked better to feel so alone."

Also following Vive l'amour's 2K restoration, Washington Square News Arts Editor Nicolas Pedrero-Setzer described Vive l'amour as "not a mere three-fold character study, but a blown-up portrait of a soul draped in sorrow that Ming-liang generously decided to make into a movie."

A German magazine was not that positive:

Vive l'Amour - Es lebe die Liebe, "Eine in die Länge gezogene Studie über Ziellosigkeit und Unbeheimatetsein, die Lebensgefühl zu spiegeln vorgibt. Die bewußt wortkarge Inszenierung, formal allenfalls mittelmäßig, endet in einem Slapstickfinale." [A lengthy study of aimlessness and unhomeliness, pretending to reflect an awareness of life. The deliberately tight-lipped production, formally at most mediocre, ended in a slapstick finale.]

== Legacy ==
On New Year's Eve in 2023—as inspired by a viral Facebook post—a flash mob gathered at Daan Forest Park at midnight to re-enact the closing scene of Vive l'amour. The gathering was seen as being symbolic of the emotions felt by revellers on New Year's Eve (who were seen dancing, crying, and socializing with others); an attendee told CNN that the event was reflective of the belief that "there isn't a uniform way of living and expressing emotions". The following year, the Taiwan Film and Audiovisual Institute organised the gathering as a formal event to mark the 30th anniversary of Vive l'amour and the park's opening; the event featured a screening of the film before midnight, and special guest appearances by Tsai Ming-liang, Yang Kuei-mei and Lee Kang-sheng. The event was attended by around 2,500 people.
