= Lu Yi-ching =

Taiwanese actress

- Born: Lu Hsiao-ling; 23 October 1958 (age 67); Taiwan
- Occupation: Actress
- Years active: 1992–present

Chinese name
- Traditional Chinese: 陸弈靜
- Simplified Chinese: 陆弈静
Transcriptions
Standard Mandarin
- Hanyu Pinyin: Lù Yìjìng

Lu Yi-ching (born 23 October 1958) is a Taiwanese actress. She has appeared in several films directed by Tsai Ming-liang, such as What Time Is It There? and The Wayward Cloud, and films by Cheng Wen-tang, including Blue Cha Cha. Lu lives in Taipei.

== Filmography ==
=== Film ===
- Will You Still Be My Friend (2026)
- Weekend in Taipei (2024)
- Hello Ghost (2023)
- We Are Champions (2019)
- Han Dan (2019)
- Pigeon Tango (2017)
- Turn Around (2017)
- Forêt Debussy (2016)
- Rookie Chef (2016)
- When Miracle Meets Maths (2015)
- The Boar King (2014)
- Stray Dogs (2013)
- Blowfish (2011)
- Face (2009)
- A Place of One's Own (2009)
- Drifting Flowers (2008)
- Shen xuan zhe (2007), English title: Brotherhood of Legion
- Xiatian de weiba (2007), English title: Summer's Tail
- Tian tang kou (2007) (under "Lu Xiao Lin"), English title: Blood Brothers
- Ai li si de jin zi (2005), English title: Reflections
- Blue Cha Cha (2005)
- Zhaibian (2005), English title: The Heirloom
- The Wayward Cloud (2005)
- Bu jian (2003), English title: The Missing
- The Skywalk Is Gone (2002)
- What Time Is It There? (2001)
- The River (1997) (as Hsiao-Ling Lu)
- Vive L'Amour (1994)
- Rebels of the Neon God (1992) (as Hsiao-Ling Lu)

=== Music video appearances ===
Year	Artist	Song title
2017	Stefanie Sun	"Windbreaker"

== Awards and nominations ==
Year	Award	Category	Nominated work	Result
1997	34th Golden Horse Awards	Best Supporting Actress	The River	Nominated
2001	38th Golden Horse Awards	Best Supporting Actress	What Time Is It There?	Nominated
2001	Asia-Pacific Film Festival	Best Supporting Actress	What Time Is It There?	Won
2003	40th Golden Horse Awards	Best Actress	The Missing	Nominated
2005	42nd Golden Horse Awards	Best Supporting Actress	Blue Cha Cha	Nominated
2006	Asia-Pacific Film Festival	Best Supporting Actress	Blue Cha Cha	Won
2009	46th Golden Horse Awards	Best Supporting Actress	A Place of One's Own	Nominated
2016	53rd Golden Horse Awards	Best Supporting Actress	Forêt Debussy	Nominated
2018	53rd Golden Bell Awards	Best Leading Actress in a Miniseries or Television Film	A-Tsuí & Kok-Siông	Won
2019	54th Golden Bell Awards	Best Supporting Actress in a Miniseries or Television Film	3 Days 2 Nights	Won
2023	58th Golden Bell Awards	Best Leading Actress in a Miniseries or Television Film	To the Sea	Nominated
