= What Time Is It There? =

2001 film

- DVD cover

Chinese name
- Traditional Chinese: 你那邊幾點
- Simplified Chinese: 你那边几点
- Literal meaning: What time is it there?
Transcriptions
Standard Mandarin
- Hanyu Pinyin: Nǐ nà biān jǐ diǎn
- Directed by: Tsai Ming-liang
- Written by: Tsai Ming-liang; Yang Pi-ying
- Produced by: Bruno Pesery; Laurence Picollec
- Starring: Lee Kang-sheng; Chen Shiang-chyi; Lu Yi-Ching
- Cinematography: Benoît Delhomme
- Edited by: Chan Sing-Cheong
- Distributed by: WinStar Cinema (United States)
- Release date: May 17, 2001 (Cannes Film Festival)
- Running time: 116 minutes
- Country: Taiwan
- Languages: Mandarin; Taiwanese; French; English

What Time Is It There? is a 2001 Taiwanese film directed by Tsai Ming-liang. It stars Lee Kang-sheng, Chen Shiang-chyi, and Lu Yi-ching.

== Plot ==
Hsiao-kang is a street vendor in Taipei who sells watches out of a briefcase. His father dies. Soon afterwards, Shiang-chyi stops by his stand to buy a dual-time watch, as she is taking a trip to Paris the following day. She likes the watch on Hsiao-kang's wrist, which is out of stock. At first, he refuses to sell his watch, explaining that a recent death in his family would mean bad luck for her, but he gives her his phone number and says he will call if he finds another. She is persistent and eventually, on the day of her departure, convinces him to sell the watch to her.

Hsiao-kang seeks out films set in Paris, and watches The 400 Blows. During his daily routines, he changes every watch and clock he encounters to Paris time. He takes a clock to a movie theater; a man sits close to him, steals the clock and exits. When Hsiao-kang follows the man to the bathroom, he finds the man suggestively covering his crotch with the clock, and Hsiao-kang leaves agitated. Meanwhile, in Paris, Shiang-chyi experiences deep loneliness in her hotel room, shops, restaurants, and the subway, partly due to her inability to speak French. She attempts to make a call at a phone booth, but is put off by a man shouting angrily in the booth opposite. Hsiao-kang's mother mourns her husband's death; she leaves out food and water for him, obsesses over possible signs of his reincarnation and, noticing that the clock in her common space has changed time, concludes that her husband is back. She turns off the lights in the apartment, blocks all the windows and shifts her daily routine to align with the clock's time. When Hsiao-kang raises a fuss, she tells him that his father’s spirit fears the light, and the two argue.

Shiang-chyi visits Père Lachaise cemetery and has a chance encounter with a man on a bench, speaking to him in English. She rummages around in her bag and says she is looking for a phone number; the man gives her his number and his name, revealing he is Jean-Pierre Léaud, the lead actor of The 400 Blows, now an adult. Shiang-chyi vomits in a restaurant bathroom, and a woman closes her stall door for her; later, in the restaurant, they converse in Mandarin, and the woman says she is from Hong Kong. She takes Shiang-chyi to her apartment, along with her suitcase. They sleep in the same bed and kiss before the woman turns away; in the morning, Shiang-chyi leaves with her suitcase amidst awkward silence. Hsiao-kang's mother dresses up and seats herself at the dining table, where a plate of food is set out for her husband. She downs several shots of liquor and retires to her bedroom, where she uses the casket containing her husband's ashes to masturbate. Hsiao-kang spends the night out and then has sex with a prostitute in his car. While he is sleeping, the prostitute steals his briefcase full of watches.

Hsiao-kang goes home, strips away the blankets blacking out the apartment balcony, gazes at his father’s portrait, covers his sleeping mother with his jacket, and lies down next to her. In one of Paris’s parks, Shiang-chyi cries while sitting on a bench by a pool. She takes medication to fall asleep, and some children take her suitcase and put it in the pool. Hsiao-kang's father appears. He takes the suitcase out of the water and walks away from the camera, heading toward a giant Ferris wheel.

== Cast ==
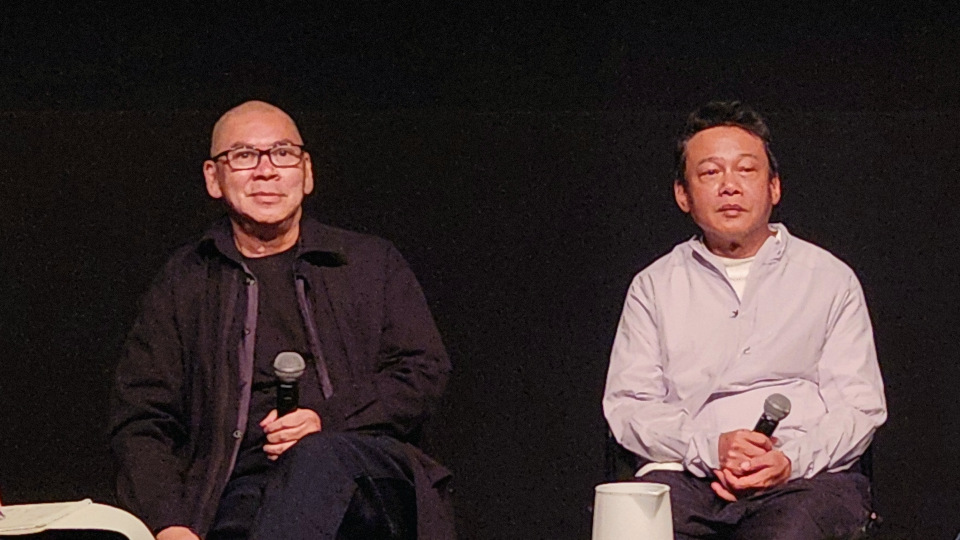
Actor Lee Kang-sheng (right) presenting What Time Is It There? with director Tsai Ming-liang in 2025

- Lee Kang-sheng as Hsiao-kang
- Chen Shiang-chyi as Shiang-chyi
- Lu Yi-ching as Hsiao-kang's mother
- Miao Tien as Hsiao-kang's father
- Cecilia Yip as Chinese woman in Paris
- Chen Chao-jung as Chinese man in subway
- Tsai Guei as Prostitute
- Jean-Pierre Léaud as Jean-Pierre / Man at cemetery
- Arthur Nauzyciel as Man at telephone booth
- David Ganansia as Man at restaurant
- Tsai Chao-yi as Clock store owner

== Production ==
The film was followed by an epilogue, The Skywalk Is Gone, which connects the characters Hsiao-Kang and Shiang-Chyi to Liang's later film, The Wayward Cloud.

== Reception ==
On review aggregator website Rotten Tomatoes, the film has an approval rating of 85% based on 54 reviews and an average rating of 7.1/10. The website's critical consensus reads, "Though it requires patience to view, What Time Is It There?'s exploration of loneliness is both elegant and haunting." On Metacritic, the film has a weighted average score of 79 out of 100 based on 20 critics, indicating "generally favorable reviews".

=== Awards ===
- Cannes Film Festival: Technical Grand Prize (Tu Duu-Chih for sound design)
- Chicago International Film Festival: Grand Jury Prize, Best Director, Best Cinematography
- Golden Horse Awards: Special Jury Award
