= Murmur of Youth =

- Film poster
- Directed by: Lin Cheng-sheng
- Written by: Lin Cheng-sheng; Ko So-ching
- Produced by: Hsu Li-kong; Chiu Shun-Ching
- Starring: Rene Liu; Jing Tseng
- Cinematography: Tsai Cheng-hui
- Edited by: Chen Hsiao-Tong; Chen Li-Yu
- Music by: Bobby Chen; Chang Hong-Yee
- Production company: Central Motion Picture Corporation
- Release date: 1997
- Running time: 106 minutes
- Country: Taiwan
- Languages: Min Nan; Mandarin Chinese

Murmur of Youth (Chinese: 美麗在唱歌) is a 1997 Taiwanese coming-of-age film directed by Lin Cheng-sheng. Stars Rene Liu and Jing Tseng shared the Best Actress award at the 1997 Tokyo International Film Festival.

== Plot ==
The film follows the parallel stories of Chen Mei-Li (Rene Liu), a middle-class suburban girl from a materialistic dysfunctional family, and the shyer, more introverted Ling Mei-li (Jing Tseng), a working-class girl being raised by her father and grandmother in a ramshackle home on the outskirts of town. The two meet when Ling, after dropping out of college when the boy she has a crush on begins dating another girl, takes a job at a local movie theater working the ticket booth with Chen. First bonding over their shared name, a close friendship slowly develops between them.

== Cast ==
- Rene Liu as Mei-li Chen
- Jing Tseng as Mei-li Ling
- Chin-Hsin Tsai as Chen's father
- Hsiu Li as Chen's mother
- Grandma Pi as Grandma
- Pi-tung Lien as Lin's dad
- Shih-Hsine Wang as Baker
- Vicky Wei as Fen baker's girlfriend
- Chao-jung Chen as Lin's schoolmate
- Jen-Feng Cheng as Chen's brother
- Chiung-hua Chen as Chen's sister-in-law
