= 22nd Hong Kong Film Awards =

2003 Hong Kong Film Awards

- Date: 6 April 2003
- Site: Hong Kong Cultural Centre
- Hosted by: Eric Tsang; John Shum; Athena Chu; Anna Yau

The 22nd Hong Kong Film Awards ceremony was held on 6 April 2003 in the Hong Kong Cultural Centre, hosted by Eric Tsang, John Shum, Athena Chu and Anna Yau. Twenty-seven winners in nineteen categories were unveiled. The year's biggest winner turned out to be Infernal Affairs, which won seven awards, including Best Film, Best Director, Best Screenplay, Best Actor, Best Supporting Actor, Best Film Editing and Best Original Film Song. Besides the eighteen regular awards, the 22nd Hong Kong Film Awards also presented veteran actors Cho Tat Wah and Shek Kin with the Professional Achievement Award.

== Awards ==
Winners are listed first, highlighted in boldface, and indicated with a double dagger (‡).

**Best Film**: **Infernal Affairs**‡; Hero; Three; Golden Chicken; Hollywood Hong Kong	**Best Director**: **Andrew Lau and Alan Mak — Infernal Affairs**‡; Peter Chan — Three; Fruit Chan — Hollywood Hong Kong; Zhang Yimou — Hero; Law Chi-Leung — Inner Senses
**Best Screenplay**: **Alan Mak and Felix Chong — Infernal Affairs**‡; Li Feng, Zhang Yimou and Wang Bin — Hero; Fruit Chan — Hollywood Hong Kong; Su Chao-pin, Chen Kuo-fu — Double Vision; Jo Jo Hui and Matt Chow — Three	**Best Actor**: **Tony Leung Chiu-Wai — Infernal Affairs**‡; Leon Lai — Three; Tony Leung Kai Fai — Double Vision; Leslie Cheung — Inner Senses; Andy Lau — Infernal Affairs
**Best Actress**: **Angelica Lee — The Eye**‡; Faye Wong — Chinese Odyssey 2002; Maggie Cheung — Hero; Sandra Ng — Golden Chicken; Karena Lam — Inner Senses	**Best Supporting Actor**: **Anthony Wong — Infernal Affairs**‡; Eric Tsang — Infernal Affairs; Chapman To — Infernal Affairs; Anthony Wong— Just One Look; Anthony Wong — Princess-d
**Best Supporting Actress**: **Rene Liu — Double Vision**‡; Zhang Ziyi — Hero; Eugenia Yuan — Three; Krystal Tin — Golden Chicken; Cecilia Yip — May & August	**Best New Performer**: **Eugenia Yuan — Three**‡; Wong You Nam — Just One Look; Wong You Nam — Hollywood Hong Kong; Barbara Wong — The Runaway Pistol; Kate Yeung — Demi-Haunted
**Best Cinematography**: **Christopher Doyle — Hero**‡; Andrew Lau and Lai Yiu-fai — Infernal Affairs; Christopher Doyle — Three; Arthur Wong — Double Vision; Peter Pau — The Touch	**Best Film Editing**: **Danny Pang and Pang Ching-Hei — Infernal Affairs**‡; Eric Kong — Three; Zhai Ru and Angie Lam — Hero; Pang Brothers — The Eye; Man Chi-Ming — Double Vision
**Best Art Direction**: **Huo Ting-Xiao and Yi Zhen-Zhou — Hero**‡; Tony Au — Chinese Odyssey 2002; Kenneth Yee and Pater Wong — Golden Chicken; Timmy Yip — Double Vision; Kenneth Yee — Three	**Best Costume Make Up Design**: **Emi Wada — Hero**‡; Lee Pik-Kwan — Infernal Affairs; Yee Chung-Man and Dora Ng — Golden Chicken; Jessie Dai — Hollywood Hong Kong; William Chang — Chinese Odyssey 2002
**Best Action Choreography**: **Tony Ching — Hero**‡; Dion Lam — Infernal Affairs; Cory Yuen and Guo Jianyong — So Close; Philip Kwok — The Touch; Stephen Tung — Princess-d	**Best Original Film Score**: **Tan Dun — Hero**‡; Peter Kam and Cho Sung-Woo — Three; Frankie Chan and Roel Garcia — Chinese Odyssey 2002; Carlton Chu and Lam Wah-Chuen — Hollywood Hong Kong; Comfort Chan — Infernal Affairs
**Best Original Film Song**: **Infernal Affairs**‡; Composer: Ronald Ng; Lyricist: Albert Leung; Singer: Andy Lau and Tony Leung Chiu-Wai; Today Next Year — If U Care; Composer: Chan Siu Ha; Lyricist: Albert Leung; Singer: Eason Chan; Hero — Hero; Composer: Zhang Yadong; Lyricist: Albert Leung; Singer: Faye Wong; I Fly — Princess-d; Composer: Jonathan Lee and Sakae Tetsuo; Lyricist: Jonathan Lee and Yamazaki Shigeru; Singer: Angelica Lee; 你會不會 — Visual Secret II; Composer: Eason Chan; Lyricist: Albert Leung; Singer: Eason Chan	**Best Sound Design**: **Tao Jing — Hero**‡; Kinson Tsang — Inner Senses; Kinson Tsang — Infernal Affairs; Sunit Asvinikul — Three; Sansab Team and Oxide Pang — The Eye
**Best Visual Effects**: **Ellen Poon, Murray Pope, Christopher Horvath** **and Jonathan Rothbart — Hero**‡; Wu Jian-Rong, Chiu Cheng-Ning, Daniel Ho and Alan Tuan — Princess-d; Jack Ho, Ronald To, Leung Wai-Kit and Wong Hing-Leung — The Eye; Christopher Doyle — Infernal Affairs; Peter Webb — Double Vision	**Best Asian Film**: **My Sassy Girl (South Korea)**‡; Joint Security Area (South Korea); I Not Stupid (Singapore); Big Shot's Funeral (China); The Way Home (South Korea)
**Professional Achievement**: **Walter Tso**‡; **Shek Kin**‡

== Others ==
The ceremony featured a performance by the "Four Heavenly Kings"—Andy Lau, Jacky Cheung, Leon Lai and Aaron Kwok—in memory of Leslie Cheung, who committed suicide on 1 April 2003. Cheung, an established actor and singer, was best remembered for his portrayal of homosexual men in films such as Farewell My Concubine and Happy Together. He was also nominated for Best Actor in this year's Hong Kong Film Awards for his role in Inner Senses.

The ceremony also paid tribute to the local health care workers battling the SARS virus, which hit Hong Kong on 11 March 2003 and would eventually claim 299 deaths there within the subsequent three months. Some audience members who were present at the ceremony were seen wearing surgical masks to prevent infection.
