= 29th Golden Horse Awards =

Award ceremony for Chinese-language films of 1991 and 1992

- Date: December 12, 1992
- Site: Sun Yat-sen Memorial Hall, Taipei, Taiwan
- Hosted by: Lawrence Cheng and Chang Hsiao-yen
- Organized by: Taipei Golden Horse Film Festival Executive Committee

Highlights
- Best Feature Film: Hill of No Return
- Best Director: Wang Toon; Hill of No Return
- Best Actor: Jackie Chan; Police Story 3: Super Cop
- Best Actress: Lindzay Chan; To Live
- Most awards: Hill of No Return (5)
- Most nominations: Hill of No Return (11)

Television in Taiwan
- Channel: CTV

The 29th Golden Horse Awards (Mandarin:第29屆金馬獎) took place on December 12, 1992 at the Sun Yat-sen Memorial Hall in Taipei, Taiwan.

== Winners and nominees ==
Winners are listed first and highlighted in boldface.

**Best Feature Film**: **Hill of No Return**; Justice, My Foot!; To Liv(e); Supercop; The Noblest Way to Die; The Peach Blossom Land	**Best Documentary Film**: **Little Grebe**; Mikado in the Mist; A Century of Taiwan Wild Birds
**Best Animation** -	**Best Director**: **Wang Toon — Hill of No Return**; Tsai Ming-liang — Rebels of the Neon God; Evans Chan — To Liv(e); Chou Tan — The Noblest Way to Die
**Best Leading Actor**: **Jackie Chan — Supercop**; Jet Li — Once Upon a Time in China II; Stephen Chow — Justice, My Foot!; Shao Xing — The Noblest Way to Die	**Best Leading Actress**: **Lindzay Chan — To Liv(e)**; Yang Kuei-mei — Hill of No Return; Wang Yu-wen — Rebels of the Neon God; Maggie Cheung — New Dragon Gate Inn
**Best Supporting Actor**: **Ku Pao-ming — The Peach Blossom Land**; Max Mok — Once Upon a Time in China II; Kevin Lin — The Noblest Way to Die; Jen Chang-bin — Hill of No Return	**Best Supporting Actress**: **Josephine Koo — To Liv(e)**; May Lo — Girls Without Tomorrow 1992; Wern Ying — Hill of No Return; Mayko Chen — Hill of No Return
**Audience Choice Award**: **Hill of No Return**	**Jury's Special Award -** **Honourable Animation Production Award**: **In Quest Magic Power**
**Special Contribution Award**: **Ho Chi-ming**
