= The Personals (1998 Taiwanese film) =

1998 film

- DVD cover art
- Traditional Chinese: 徵婚啓事
- Simplified Chinese: 征婚启事
- Literal meaning: Marriage Wanted
- Hanyu Pinyin: Zhēng Hūn Qǐ Shì
- Directed by: Chen Kuo-fu
- Screenplay by: Chen Kuo-fu; (Chen Shih-chieh)
- Based on: Marriage Wanted by Jade Y. Chen
- Produced by: Hsu Li-kong
- Starring: Rene Liu
- Cinematography: Ho Nan-hong
- Edited by: Chang Dar-lung
- Music by: Steve Liu
- Production company: Central Motion Pictures
- Release date: 13 March 1998 (Taiwan)
- Running time: 104 minutes
- Country: Taiwan
- Language: Mandarin

The Personals is a 1998 Taiwanese comedy-drama film directed and co-written by Chen Kuo-fu, based on Jade Y. Chen's 1992 novel of the same name. The film follows a career woman (Rene Liu) as she encounters a diverse bunch of men after placing a personal advertisement in the newspaper. It was screened in the Un Certain Regard section at the 1999 Cannes Film Festival. Liu won Best Actress at the 1999 Asia-Pacific Film Festival.

== Cast ==
- Rene Liu as Du Jia-zhen, an ophthalmologist
- Lo Pei-an as Lo Pei-an, Du Jia-zhen's former college instructor
- Chen Chao-jung
- Wu Bai
- Ku Pao-ming
- Chin Shih-chieh
- Shih Yi-nan
- Pu Hsueh-liang
- Sisy Chen as herself
- Doze Niu as himself

== See also ==
- Mr. Right Wanted, a 2014 Taiwanese TV series based on the same novel
