= Double Vision (2002 film) =

2002 film by Chen Kuo-fu

- Theatrical release poster
- Directed by: Chen Kuo-fu
- Written by: Chen Kuo-fu; Su Chao-pin
- Produced by: Chen Kuo-fu; Huang Chih-ming
- Starring: Tony Leung Ka-fai; David Morse; Rene Liu
- Cinematography: Arthur Wong; Han Yun-chun
- Edited by: Man Chi-ming; Wei Te-sheng; Chen Kuo-fu
- Music by: Cincin Lee
- Production companies: Columbia Pictures Film Production Asia; Nan Fang Film Production
- Distributed by: Columbia TriStar Film Distributors International
- Release dates: 20 May 2002 (Cannes Film Festival); 25 October 2002 (Taiwan)
- Running time: 113 minutes 110 minutes (USA)
- Countries: Taiwan; Hong Kong
- Languages: Mandarin; Taiwanese; English
- Box office: US$1.5 million

Double Vision (Chinese: 雙瞳; pinyin: Shuang tong) is a 2002 mystery horror film directed by Chen Kuo-fu. The plot is about an FBI agent working with a troubled Taiwanese cop to hunt for a serial killer who is embedding a mysterious black fungus in the brains of the victims. It was screened in the Un Certain Regard section at the 2002 Cannes Film Festival.

== Plot ==
Police detective Huang Huo-tu, a Waisheng ren (Mainland Chinese) in Taiwan, has relegated himself to a mundane job as a Foreign Affairs Officer as self-punishment for blowing the whistle on corruption in the force, and his colleagues have turned their backs on him. His young daughter is left traumatized after being taken hostage in a gun battle, and his wife Ching-fang is filing for divorce. Huang is on the verge of a severe nervous breakdown.

A series of bizarre deaths in Taipei baffle local investigators, including a Christian preacher of foreign nationality found disemboweled. The priest is involved in the Taiwan-US military trade, so FBI agent Kevin Richter is called in to help. Huang, who can speak English, is made his liaison. Kevin, the topmost serial killer expert in the field, was previously investigating a series of murders in US in which all victims appeared willing to die.

The crime scenes imply the involvement of supernatural forces. In one case a businessman froze to death in his office in the middle of a heatwave; in another the mistress of a prominent official called the fire department and was later found burned to death - with no sign of a fire ever occurring in her apartment. Richter is skeptical but Huang, who is more receptive to supernatural possibilities, suggests they investigate a local cult. After consulting a scholar in Academia Sinica, Huang and Kevin find that the killings follows a form of Taoist belief that one must fulfill five types of suffering required to become a Xian, an immortal being. According to legend, having double pupils allows a person to see the sins of another. The scholar tells them that there is a legend of a person who had double pupils, he used his ability to send these sinners to hell, and subsequently acquired immortality through his actions.

They also find that all victims have done something against their conscience, and that a kind of fungus was used to induce hallucination, pleasure and guilt which made the victims kill themselves. An advanced technology was used to spread the fungus, and the Police traced this technology to two bosses of an electronics company in Hsinchu Science Park. The men spent their fortune to move a Taoist temple into their company, where many cultists gather. The police enter the building and finds the temple. They start to arrest everyone but the cultists fight back. There is a massacre and many officers and cultists die. After the massacre Kevin and Huang finds a seemingly innocent girl hidden inside a chamber at the back of the temple. The case is closed.

The next day Huang finds Kevin dead, having pulled out his own tongue, which is the fifth suffering required. Huang finds that both he and Kevin were infected with the fungus. Huang begins to hallucinate, tormented by the guilt he feels for his wife and daughter. He sees the girl survivor beckoning to him so he goes off in search of her. He visits the hospital but is informed that the girl left. He then goes to the temple where the girl is waiting for him. It is revealed that the girl, Hsieh Ya-li, is the actual cult's leader who has the double pupils in her eye and believes that by having Huang kill her, she can complete the final and last requirement to become immortal. Hsieh puts Huang through a series of hallucinations, his guilt building and eating away at his consciousness, until it finally culminates into Huang killing her.

There are two endings to the film. Both using Buddhist Gatha. The happy ending reveals that "love is immortal" (有愛不死), hinting to us that Huang doesn't die and he is saved because of the love for his family. The other version from the DVD reveals that he dies.

== Cast ==
- Tony Leung Ka-fai as Huang Huo-tu
- David Morse as Kevin Richter
- Rene Liu as Ching-fang
- Leon Dai as Li Feng-bo
- Yang Kuei-mei as Coroner
- Huang Wei-han as Mei-mei
- Sihung Lung as Dr. Sheng
- Hannah Lin as Hsieh Ya-li
- Ray Chang as Plainclothes police officer

== Influence ==
The film is a Columbia Pictures production, and the director Chen Kuo-fu, at the time, was the head of Columbia Pictures' Asian branch. It is one of a series of attempts by Columbia Pictures to invest and produce Asian movies with its Asian branch. The film impressed Taiwanese directors with its "Hollywood way" of filmmaking. With this film the director Chen Kuo-fu accumulated his experience in international collaboration and went on to work in China. The film's assistant director Wei Te-sheng and producer Jimmy Huang said they were stimulated by the big-budget effects of the film, and determined to make a movie on big budget. They later collaborated in local hit Cape No. 7 and big budget epic Seediq Bale. The film's screenwriter Su Chao-Pin later directed Silk. Leon Dai, a supporting actor, later directed No Puedo Vivir Sin Ti. They said that they were stimulated by this production.

== Awards and nominations ==
List of Accolades
Award / Film Festival	Category	Recipient(s)	Result
22nd Hong Kong Film Awards	Best Screenplay	Chen Kuo-fu, Su Chao-pin	Nominated
22nd Hong Kong Film Awards	Best Actor	Tony Leung Ka-fai	Nominated
22nd Hong Kong Film Awards	Best Supporting Actress	Rene Liu	Won
22nd Hong Kong Film Awards	Best Cinematography	Arthur Wong	Nominated
22nd Hong Kong Film Awards	Best Film Editing	Man Chi-ming	Nominated
22nd Hong Kong Film Awards	Best Art Direction	Timmy Yip	Nominated
22nd Hong Kong Film Awards	Best Visual Effects	Peter Webb	Nominated
39nd Golden Horse Awards	Best Supporting Actor	David Morse	Nominated
39nd Golden Horse Awards	Best Sound Effects	Paul Pirola, Tu Duu-chih	Nominated
39nd Golden Horse Awards	Best Visual Effects	Patrick Wang, Peter Webb	Nominated
4th Asian Film Critics Association Awards	Best Supporting Actress	Rene Liu	Won
