= Rene Liu =

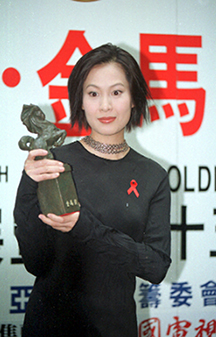
- Liu at the 35th Golden Horse Awards
- Born: 1 June 1969 (age 57); Taipei, Taiwan
- Education: California State University, Fullerton
- Occupations: Singer; songwriter; actress; writer; film director
- Years active: 1995-present
- Spouse: Zhong Shi (m. 2011)
- Children: 1

Chinese name
- Traditional Chinese: 劉若英
- Simplified Chinese: 刘若英
Transcriptions
Standard Mandarin
- Hanyu Pinyin: Liú Ruòyīng
Southern Min
- Hokkien POJ: Lâu Jio̍k-eng
- Musical career
- Also known as: Liu Jo-ying 奶茶 (Nǎichá; milk tea)
- Genre: Mandopop
- Instruments: Guitar, Vocals
- Labels: Rock Records; Music Nation Group; AsiaMuse; B'in Music
- Website: www.bin-music.com.tw/artist/1006/劉若英-RENÉ%20LIU

Rene Liu Ruo-ying (Chinese: 劉若英; Pe̍h-ōe-jī: Lâu Jio̍k-eng; born 1 June 1969), also known by her nickname "Milk Tea", is a Taiwanese singer-songwriter, actress, and director.

== Career ==
Liu was born in Taipei, Taiwan on June 1, 1969, to an affluent family from Liling, Hunan. Liu's grandfather was a KMT general. Her parents divorced when she was young and she grew up with her grandparents. Liu attended California State University, Fullerton with a bachelor's degree in music.

After college, Liu returned to Taiwan and became an assistant for singer Bobby Chen. Chen served as the producer for Liu's debut album in 1995.

In 2012, Liu directed her first short film, "Love Limited Edition," where she wrote, produced, directed, and starred in. In 2018, Liu directed her first feature film, Us and Them, gaining $157 million in box office revenue and making Liu the highest grossing female director for Chinese films at the time.

== Personal life ==
On August 8, 2011, Liu married businessman Zhong Xiaojiang (Zhong Shi) in Beijing. In 2015, she gave birth to a son.

== Discography ==
=== Studio albums ===
- 1995: René's Selected Theme Songs (少女小漁的美麗與哀愁)
- 1995: Raining Season (雨季)
- 1996: Walk Around (到處亂走)
- 1998: Love You More & More (很愛很愛你)
- 2000: Waiting for You (我等你)
- 2001: Those Were the Days (年華)
- 2002: Love and the City
- 2003: My Failures and Glory (我的失敗與偉大)
- 2004: I've Heard? (聽說?)
- 2005: All Night Long (一整夜)
- 2008: I'm Fine (我很好)
- 2010: Together (在一起)
- 2013: For The Loved (親愛的路人)
- 2015: Wish You Well (我要你好好的)
- 2021: Each Well (各自安好)

=== Compilation albums ===
- 2001: Harvest (收穫)
- 2003: Rock Hong Kong 10th Anniversary - René Liu Greatest Hits (滾石香港黃金十年-劉若英精選)
- 2008: René

=== Live albums ===
- 2003: 單身日誌 演唱會LIVE全紀錄
- 2012: 劉若英脫掉高跟鞋世界巡迴演唱會 (One Night Stand by Rene 2010–2011)
- 2017: 劉若英 Renext 我敢 世界巡迴演唱會 LIVE
- 2020: 2020劉若英陪你 獻上錄音專輯

=== Soundtrack albums ===
- 2004: 20 30 40 (20.30.40 愛得精采)
- 2007: Happy Birthday (《生日快樂》 電影原聲帶)
- 2008: Run Papa Run (《一個好爸爸》 電影原聲帶)
- 2012: C'est Quoi L'Amour? (愛情限量版)

=== Singles and EPs ===
- 1992: 在這恬靜的暗晡頭 (featuring Ayugo Huang)
- 1992: 遊子
- 1992: 思鄉 (featuring Bobby Chen)
- 1992: 達邦!我的鄉 (featuring Bobby Chen, Ayugo Huang, 劉佳慧)
- 1992: 黑水溝 (featuring Bobby Chen)
- 1995: 兩個世界
- 1997: 男人港 (featuring Bobby Chen)
- 1998: 大地之歌 (featuring Alex To, Bobby Chen, Chyi Yu, Fish Leong, Karen Mok, Mayday, Michael Wong, Richie Jen, Victor Wong, Wakin Chau, Wanfang, Winnie Hsin, Angelica Lee, Fengie Wang, Bobby Dou, Tarcy Su, Walkie Talkie)
- 1998: 種子 (featuring Bobby Chen, Michael Wong, Victor Wong, Sylvia Chang, 蕭言中, 阿von, 陳傑漢)
- 2001: 候鳥
- 2001: 年華(unplugged)
- 2002: 一輩子的孤單
- 2002: 大家來戀愛 (featuring Jeffrey Kung, Yuki Hsu)
- 2004: 聽!是誰在唱歌? (featuring Kay Huang)
- 2004: 聽說? (台灣預購限定盤)
- 2007: 不能跟情人說的話 (featuring FanFan)
- 2007: 最好的未來 (featuring 乔木楠)
- 2008: 分开旅行(Remixed) (featuring Stanley Huang)
- 2011: 沒有旋律配得上你 (featuring Yen-j)
- 2014: 半路
- 2015: 念念 (電影原聲帶)
- 2015: 我敢在你懷裡孤獨
- 2016: 你有沒有深愛過 (湖南衛視《青雲志》主題曲)
- 2017: 粉絲 (電影《二代妖精之今生有幸》片尾曲)
- 2020: 媽媽
- 2020: 快樂天堂
- 2020: 不營業的日常
- 2020: 每天的不理想 (featuring Kowen Ko)
- 2021: 黃金年代
- 2021: 人潮裡
- 2021: 所有相愛的人啊(熱情版)

== Filmography ==
=== Film ===
Year	English title	Original title	Role	Notes
1995	Peony Pavilion	我的美麗與哀愁	Liu Yu-mei	
1995	Siao Yu	少女小漁	Lin Siao-yu	
1995	Don't Cry, Nanking	南京1937	Shuqin	
1996	Tonight Nobody Goes Home	今天不回家	Xiaoqi	
1996	Accidental Legend	飛天		
1996	Red Persimmon	紅柿子	Wang Kuang-hui	Cameo
1996	Thunder Cop	新喋血雙雄/ 狹路險情	Liu Mei-ying	
1997	Murmur of Youth	美麗在唱歌	Chen Mei-li	
1997	A Chinese Ghost Story: The Tsui Hark Animation	小倩	Xiaodie	Mandarin dub
1998	The Personals	征婚啟事	Dr. Du Jia-zhen	
2000	Fleeing by Night	夜奔	Wei Ying-er	Also known as Feeling by Night
2001	Migratory Bird	侯鳥	Chen Fang-ning	
2001	X-Roads	新十字街頭	Yang Shao	
2002	Double Vision	雙瞳	Ching-fang	
2004	A World Without Thieves	天下無賊	Wang Li	
2004	20 30 40	20:30:40	Xiang Xiang	
2004	The Butterfly Lovers	蝴蝶夢－梁山伯與祝英台	Zhu Yingtai	Voice
2007	Kidnap	綁架	Inspector Ho Yuan-chun	
2007	The Matrimony	心中有鬼	Sansan	
2007	Happy Birthday	生日快樂	Mi	
2008	Run Papa Run	一個好爸爸	Mabel Chan	
2010	Hot Summer Days	全城熱戀	Li Yan	
2011	Speed Angels	極速天使	Han Bing	
2011	Mayday 3DNA	3DNA: 五月天 3D 演唱會電影	Xiao Nai	
2011	Love in Space	全球熱戀	Rose Huang	
2011	Mr. and Mrs. Single	隱婚男女	Mandy	
2011	Starry Starry Night	星空	Mei's mother	
2017	Love Education	相愛相親	Mrs. Wang	Cameo
2018	Us and Them	後來的我們	—N/a	Director
2022	Welcome home	家家	Lo Chia-chia	
2025	Unexpected Courage	我們意外的勇氣	Love (Le-fu)	

=== Television series ===
Year	English title	Original title	Role	Notes
1996	Sunset in Forbidden City	日落紫禁城	Shanggong Yiner	
1996	Cracker	—N/a	Su Lin Tang	Series 4, episode "White Ghost"
2000	April Rhapsody	人間四月天	Zhang Youyi	
2000	Daily Growing	住在十字架裡的母親	Hsia Bi-he	
2002	Hot Ladies	澀女郎	Fang Hsiao-ping	
2003	Si Shui Nian Hua	似水年華	Ying	
2003	Pink Ladies	粉红女郎	Jie Hunkuang	
2004	The Legend of Eileen Chang	她從海上來 - 張愛玲傳奇	Eileen Chang	
2004	Double Sounding Cannon	雙響炮	Sherry	
2006	New Age Of Marriage	新結婚時代	Gu Xiaoxi	
2014	He and His Sons	半路父子	Jiang Xin	
2025	Forget You Not	忘了我記得	—N/a	Director

== Awards and nominations ==
Year	Award	Category	Nominated work	Result
1995	32nd Golden Horse Awards	Best Leading Actress	Siao Yu	Nominated
1995	Asia-Pacific Film Festival	Best Actress	Siao Yu	Won
1997	Tokyo International Film Festival	Best Actress	Murmur of Youth	Won
1998	35th Golden Horse Awards	Best Leading Actress	The Personals	Nominated
1998	35th Golden Horse Awards	Special Jury Award	The Personals	Won
1998	Taipei Film Awards	Best Actress	The Personals	Won
2000	Paris Film Festival	Press Award-Special Mention	The Personals	Won
1999	Asia-Pacific Film Festival	Best Actress	The Personals	Won
2000	35th Golden Bell Awards	Best Actress	Daily Growing	Won
2003	22nd Hong Kong Film Awards	Best Supporting Actress	Double Vision	Won
2003	Asian Film Critics Association Awards	Best Supporting Actress	Double Vision	Won
2004	Hong Kong Film Critics Society Awards	Best Actress	20 30 40	Nominated
2005	10th Golden Bauhinia Awards	Best Actress	A World Without Thieves	Won
2005	5th Chinese Film Media Awards	Best Actress	A World Without Thieves	Won
2005	12th Beijing College Student Film Festival	Best Actress	A World Without Thieves	Nominated
2006	28th Hundred Flowers Awards	Best Actress	A World Without Thieves	Won
2007	26th Hong Kong Film Awards	Best Actress	Happy Birthday	Nominated
2007	26th Hong Kong Film Awards	Best Original Film Song	Happy Birthday - "Happy Birthday" (as performer)	Nominated
2007	26th Golden Rooster Awards	Best Actress	Kidnap	Nominated
2007	44th Golden Horse Awards	Best Leading Actress	Kidnap	Nominated
2007	12th Golden Bauhinia Awards	Best Actress	Kidnap	Nominated
2007	13th Shanghai Television Festival	Best Actress	New Age Of Marriage	Won
2008	27th Hong Kong Film Awards	Best Actress	Kidnap	Nominated
2008	Hong Kong Society of Cinematographers Awards	Most Charismatic Actress		Won
2016	35th Hong Kong Film Awards	Best Original Film Song	Murmur of the Hearts - "Murmur of the Hearts" (as performer)	Nominated
2018	55th Golden Horse Awards	Best New Director	Us and Them	Nominated
2018	55th Golden Horse Awards	Best Adapted Screenplay	Us and Them	Nominated
2019	32nd Golden Rooster Awards	Best Directorial Debut	Us and Them	Nominated
2019	32nd Golden Rooster Awards	Best Picture	Us and Them	Nominated
2019	32nd Golden Rooster Awards	Best Writing	Us and Them	Nominated
2023	58th Golden Bell Awards	Best Theme Song	"Epitome" (from Women in Taipei)	Nominated
2025	55th Golden Horse Awards	Best Leading Actress	Unexpected Courage	Nominated
2026	61st Golden Bell Awards	Best Directing for a Miniseries or TV Film	Forget You Not	Nominated
2026	61st Golden Bell Awards	Best Writing for a Miniseries or TV Film	Forget You Not	Nominated
