= 41st Golden Horse Awards =

Award ceremony for Chinese-language films of 2003 and 2004

- Promotional poster
- Date: December 4, 2004
- Site: Zhongshan Hall, Taichung, Taiwan
- Hosted by: Kevin Tsai and Lin Chi-ling
- Preshow hosts: Blackie Chen and Tony Fish
- Organized by: Taipei Golden Horse Film Festival Executive Committee

Highlights
- Best Feature Film: Kekexili: Mountain Patrol
- Best Director: Johnnie To; Breaking News
- Best Actor: Andy Lau; Infernal Affairs III
- Best Actress: Yang Kuei-mei; The Moon Also Rises
- Most awards: New Police Story (4)
- Most nominations: 2046 (8)

Television in Taiwan
- Channel: TVBS-G
- Ratings: 5.30% (average)

The 41st Golden Horse Awards (Mandarin:第41屆金馬獎) took place on December 4, 2004 at Zhongshan Hall in Taichung, Taiwan.

== Winners and nominees ==
Winners are listed first and highlighted in boldface.

| **Best Feature Film**: **Kekexili: Mountain Patrol**; Breaking News; The Moon Also Rises; 2046; One Nite in Mongkok | **Best Short Film**: **The Magical Washmachine**; Stars by the Window; Lamb |
| **Best Documentary**: **Chronicle of the Sea, Nan-Fang-Ao**; Stone Dream; Shihkang Story | **Best Animation Feature**: **McDull, Prince de la Bun**; The Butterfly Lovers |
| **Best Director**: **Johnnie To — Breaking News**; Lu Chuan — Kekexili: Mountain Patrol; Derek Yee — One Nite in Mongkok; Fruit Chan — Dumplings | **Best Leading Actor**: **Andy Lau — Infernal Affairs III**; Jacky Cheung — Golden Chicken 2; Tony Leung Chiu-wai — 2046; Tobgyal — Kekexili: Mountain Patrol |
| **Best Leading Actress**: **Yang Kuei-mei — The Moon Also Rises**; Sylvia Chang — Rice Rhapsody; Zhang Ziyi — 2046; Wang Chuan — Autumn of Blue | **Best Supporting Actor**: **Daniel Wu — New Police Story**; Cheung Siu-fai — Throw Down; Eric Kot — A-1 Headline; Tony Leung Ka-fai — A-1 Headline |
| **Best Supporting Actress**: **Bai Ling — Dumplings**; Kate Yeung — 20 30 40; Angelica Lee — 20 30 40; Eugenia Yuan — The Eye 2 | **Best New Performer**: **Chloe Hong — Bear Hug**; **Tony Yang — Formula 17**; James Chen — Splendid Float; Tian Yuan — Butterfly |
| **Audience Choice Award**: **New Police Story** | **Outstanding Taiwanese Film of the Year**: **Splendid Float** |
| **Outstanding Taiwanese Filmmaker of the Year**: **Chen Po-wen** | **Lifetime Achievement Award**: **Ah Pi Po** |
