= 20 30 40 =

2004 film

- Hong Kong Poster
- Directed by: Sylvia Chang
- Screenplay by: Sylvia Chang
- Produced by: Patricia Cheng; Hsu Li-kong; Chen Kuo-fu
- Starring: Sylvia Chang; Rene Liu; Angelica Lee
- Cinematography: Chien Hsiang
- Edited by: Liao Ching-sung
- Music by: Kay Huang
- Production companies: Columbia Pictures Film Production Asia; Red on Red; Tang Moon International Productions
- Distributed by: Columbia TriStar Film Distributors International
- Release date: March 5, 2004 (Taiwan)
- Running time: 113 minutes
- Country: Taiwan
- Language: Mandarin
- Box office: US$704,550

20 30 40 is a 2004 Taiwanese film directed by Sylvia Chang. It was nominated for the Golden Bear at the 2004 Berlin International Film Festival, and was Taiwan's submission to the 77th Academy Awards for the Academy Award for Best Foreign Language Film, but was not accepted as a nominee.

== Plot ==
The film tells the stories of three women aged 20, 30, and 40, in different stages of their lives.

Xiao Jie, a Malaysian girl who just turned 20, has arrived in Taipei for the first time to make her dream of being a pop star come true. Xie Jie makes friends with Yi Tong, a Hong Kong girl who pursues a music career as well. When they meet with reverses and realize the facts of life, they find themselves in the mire.

Xiang Xiang is a 30-years-old flight attendant. During a conversation with her colleague, Xiang Xiang says she is caught between two men. One is a mature doctor but already married, and the other one is a young recorder who is still ignorant. However, she still retains the memory of her ex-boyfriend in New York. Xiang Xiang is confused and does not know who her true love is.

Lily is a 40-year-old woman who is divorced. Facing life as a single woman in her middle-age, Lily tries out a new lifestyle while learning how to get along with her own company and what a middle-aged woman really needs before love and success.

== Cast ==
- Sylvia Chang as Lily
- Rene Liu as Xiang Xiang
- Angelica Lee as Xiao Jie
- Kate Yeung as Tong Yi
- Tony Leung Ka-fai as Shi-Jie 'Jerry' Zhang
- Anthony Wong Chau-sang as Shi Ge
- Richie Ren as Wang, the tennis instructor
- Bolin Chen as Rock musician
- Joanne Tseng as Lily's daughter
- Chang Hung-Liang

== Soundtrack ==
The theme song of the movie which is called "20 30 40" as well was sung by Sylvia Chang, Rene Liu and Angelica Lee. The song expresses how women want and need in modern society, telling the audience that no matter what stage of life you are arriving, the way you choose to live is the most important. Happiness and beauty are not restricted by age.

== Release ==
The film was originally released in 2004 in Germany, and then was released on screens in Taiwan, Hong Kong and Korea. The film was released on DVD in 2005 in Argentina by Columbia TriStar Films de Argentina, Italy and Hungary.

== See also ==
- Cinema of Taiwan
- List of submissions to the 77th Academy Awards for Best Foreign Language Film
