= Wang Yuwen =

Wang Yuwen or Wang Yu-wen may refer to:

- Wang Yu-wen (Taiwanese actress) (王渝文; born 1971)
- Wang Yuwen (Chinese actress) (王玉雯; born 1997)
