= Hu Chien-chung =

Chinese newspaper editor and politician

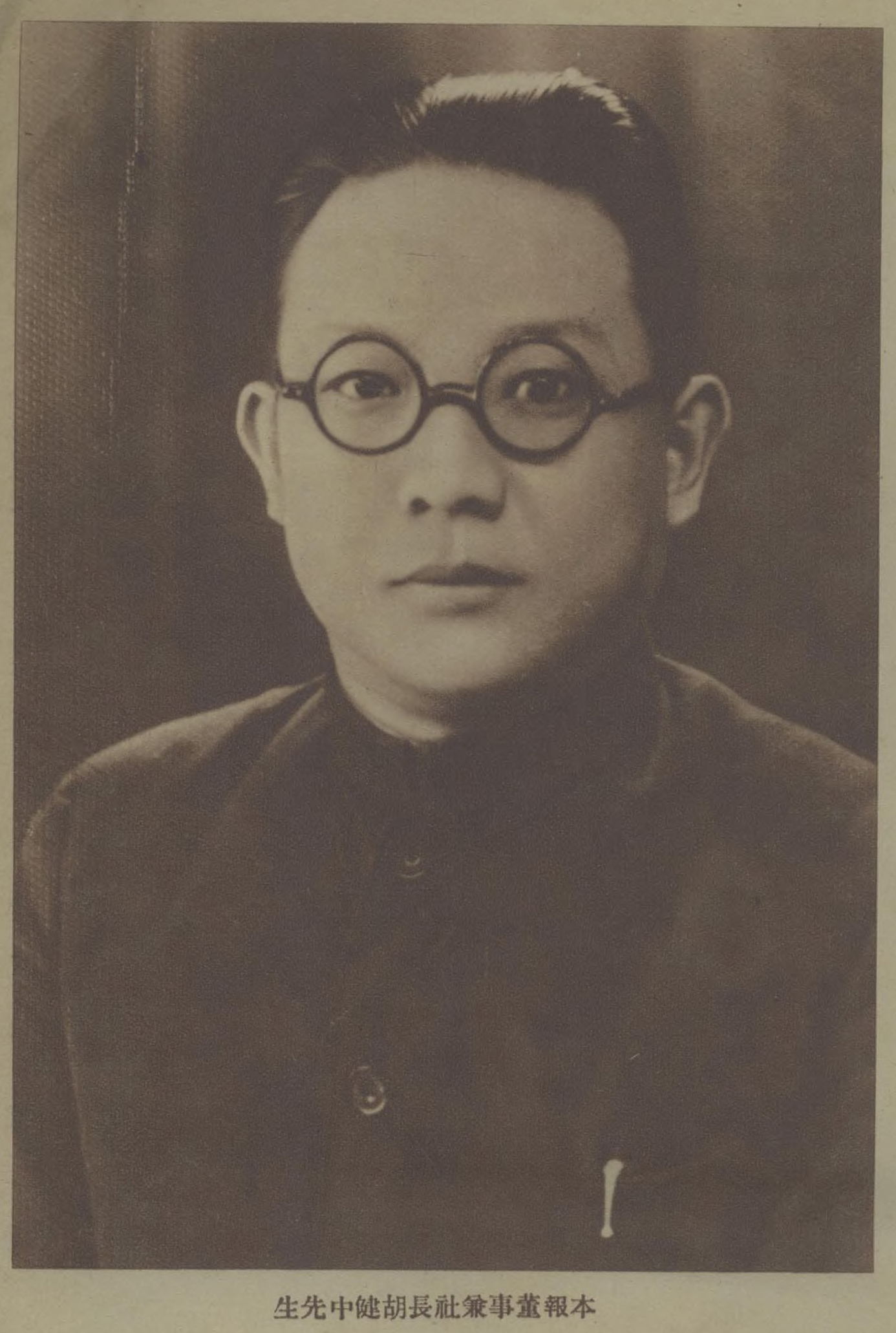

Hu Chien-chung (Chinese: 胡健中; 1 February 1904 – 26 September 1993) was a Chinese newspaper editor and politician. He was a member of the National Political Assembly from 1938, elected to the Constituent National Assembly in 1946, and served on the Legislative Yuan as a representative of the press from 1948.

== Life and career ==
Born Hu Ching-ya (胡經亞) in Nanjing, he was also known as Chen-ou (震歐), by the courtesy name Hsu-jou (絮若), or the pen name Hung-tzu (蘅子). After graduating from the Department of English at Fudan University, Hu taught at a middle school in Jiangsu, then at his alma mater before accepting a lectureship in journalism at the Central School of Governance. In 1928, Hu became the chief editor of the Republican Daily in Hangzhou. The newspaper was renamed the Southeastern Daily in 1934. After the Second Sino-Japanese War broke out, Hu moved the newspaper to Jinhua, and later established editions of the Southeastern Daily in Yanping and Lishui. From 1943 to 1946, he worked concurrently for the Central Daily News and the Southeastern Daily. Hu resigned his position at the Central Daily News to establish the Shanghai edition of the Southeastern Daily and the affiliated Southeastern Journalism Company, which focused on the Hangzhou and Shanghai editions of the newspaper.

He moved to Taiwan with the Chiang Kai-shek-led government of the Republic of China. Outside of his legislative service, Hu was elected to several terms as a member of the Central Standing Committee of the Kuomintang during the 1960s, led the Central Motion Picture Corporation, and chaired the 1965 Chia Hsin Awards committee.
