= Tonight Nobody Goes Home =

1996 film

- Film poster
- Directed by: Sylvia Chang
- Written by: Sylvia Chang; Khan Lee
- Produced by: Hsu Li-Kong; Chung Hu-pin
- Starring: Sihung Lung
- Cinematography: Chang Ta-lung
- Edited by: Mei Fung
- Music by: Richard Yuen
- Production company: Central Motion Picture Corporation
- Release date: 10 September 1996 (TIFF)
- Running time: 120 minutes
- Country: Taiwan
- Language: Mandarin

Tonight Nobody Goes Home (Chinese: 今天不回家, Jin tian bu hui jia) is a 1996 Taiwanese comedy film directed by Sylvia Chang. The film was selected as the Taiwanese entry for the Best Foreign Language Film at the 69th Academy Awards, but was not accepted as a nominee.

== Cast ==
- Sihung Lung as Dr. Chen Pinyan
- Gua Ah-leh as Mrs. Chen
- Winston Chao as Chen Siming
- Rene Liu as Chen Xiaoqi
- Jordan Chan as Changgang
- Yang Kuei-mei as Qin Zhen
- Alex To as Longlong

== See also ==
- List of submissions to the 69th Academy Awards for Best Foreign Language Film
- List of Taiwanese submissions for the Academy Award for Best Foreign Language Film
