= Ming Ji =

Taiwanese film director

Ming Ji (Chinese: 明驥; 24 January 1923 – 15 June 2012) was a Taiwanese film director. As the general manager of the Central Motion Picture Corporation, Ming worked extensively with many prominent Taiwanese New Wave directors such as Hsiao Yeh, Hou Hsiao-hsien, Wu Nien-jen and Edward Yang. Ming received the Golden Horse Award for lifetime achievement in 2009.

He died of organ failure at Tri-Service General Hospital on 15 June 2012, at the age of 89.
