= Siao Yu =

- Poster
- Directed by: Sylvia Chang
- Written by: Sylvia Chang; Ang Lee; Geling Yan
- Produced by: Dolly Hall; Hsu Li-kong; Ang Lee
- Starring: Rene Liu; Marj Dusay
- Cinematography: Joe DeSalvo
- Edited by: Mei Feng
- Music by: Bobbi Dar
- Distributed by: EDKO Film (Hong Kong)
- Release date: September 11, 1995 (Toronto Film Festival)
- Running time: 104 minutes
- Country: Taiwan
- Languages: English, Mandarin, Cantonese

Siao Yu (Chinese: 少女小漁) is a Taiwanese film directed by Sylvia Chang, written by Sylvia Chang and Ang Lee, starring Rene Liu in her debut film role, released in 1995.

Rene Liu was nominated for the Golden Horse Award Best Actress in 1994, and won the Asia-Pacific Film Festival Best Actress award in 1995.

== Cast ==
- Rene Liu (as “Joyin Liu”) as Lin Siao Yu
- Marj Dusay as Rita
- Tou Chung-hua as Giang Wei
- Daniel J. Travanti as Mario Moretti
- Connie Tai-Fung Hsia as Baoshu
- Ajay Mehta as Photo clerk
- Daxing Zhang as Lao Chai
- Joseph Ricca as Frank
- Nunzio Sapienza as Mike
- Stephen Daly as Tino
- Di Cheng as Shelley
