= Terry Hu =

Taiwanese actress, writer and translator (born 1953)

- 胡因夢
- Born: Hu Yinyin (胡因因); 21 April 1953 (age 73); Taichung, Taiwan
- Other names: Hu Yinzi (胡因子); Hu Yinmeng (胡茵夢)
- Education: Fu Jen Catholic University; Seton Hall University
- Occupations: Actress; writer; translator
- Years active: 1975–present
- Notable work: The Life God; Far Away From Home; A Teacher of Great Soldiers
- Spouse(s): Li Ao (1980.05.06–08.28)
- Children: 1
- Parent(s): Hu Gengnian; Qu Shifang
- Awards: Golden Horse Award for Best Supporting Actress; 1977 Far Away From Home

Chinese name
- Traditional Chinese: 胡因夢
- Simplified Chinese: 胡因梦
Transcriptions
Standard Mandarin
- Hanyu Pinyin: Hū Yīnmèng

Hu Yinyin
- Chinese: 胡因因
Transcriptions
Standard Mandarin
- Hanyu Pinyin: Hū Yīnyīn

Hu Yinzi
- Chinese: 胡因子
Transcriptions
Standard Mandarin
- Hanyu Pinyin: Hū Yīnzĭ

Terry Hu (Chinese: 胡因夢; pinyin: Hū Yīnmèng; born 21 April 1953) is a Taiwanese actress, writer and translator.

== Life ==
=== Early life ===
Hu was born Hu Yinyin in Taichung, Taiwan on April 21, 1953, with her ancestral home in Shenyang, Liaoning, the only daughter of Qu Shifang (璩詩芳), and Hu Gengnian (胡賡年), a member of the Legislative Yuan of the Republic of China. Hu was raised in Taichung and Taipei. When she was 15, her parents divorced.

Hu attended the Christchurch School. She graduated from Fu Jen Catholic University in 1971, where she majored in German language. When she left Fu Jen Catholic University, her university students said: "Fu Jen Catholic University have no spring from now on." After graduation, Hu went abroad to study at Seton Hall University, majoring in mass communication, she also studied at a modeling school in New York City.

=== Acting career ===
Hu returned to Taiwan in 1975. At the same year, Hu first rose to prominence for playing in The Life God, a film starring Brigitte Lin.

In 1977, Hu appeared in Bai Jingrui's Far Away From Home, which earned her a Golden Horse Award for Best Supporting Actress. One year later, Hu acted in the historical film A Teacher of Great Soldiers, a film starring Chun Hsiung Ko.

Hu studied at HB Studio, majoring in acting.

In 2003, Hu attended the 40th Golden Horse Awards.

At the age of 35, Hu withdrew from entertainment industry, she appeared in 42 films during her 15 acting years.

=== Writing and translating career ===
In 1986, Hu gave up her acting career to focus on writing and translating, and became one of the pioneers of the New Age in Taiwan. She has translated the works of Jiddu Krishnamurti, Pema Chödrön, A. H. Almaas and Ken Wilber. She has emerged as "a leading figure of Taiwan's New Age and an inventive individual in the New Age's global dissemination," and has described "women as being particularly receptive to New Age thought and having a vital role to play in planetary transformation."

== Personal life ==
On May 6, 1980, Hu married Taiwanese writer, historian and politician Li Ao. Their love story was even featured by Time. Their wedding was held in Li's living room. Hu chose her pajama as her wedding dress.

But the couple divorced on August 28, 1980, after about three months of marriage (115 days in total). Since their divorce, the two often have had mutual criticism.

On November 25, 1994, Hu gave birth to her only daughter, Hu Jiesheng (胡潔生), as a single mother. Hu has never publicly revealed the child's biological father.

== Works ==
=== Book ===
- Death and the Maiden (Chinese: 死亡與童女之舞), ISBN 978-957-607-378-6.
- Ancient Future (Chinese: 古老的未來), ISBN 957968510X.
- Immensee (Chinese: 茵夢湖)
- Hu Yan Meng Yu (Chinese: 胡言夢語)

=== Translation ===
- When Life Falls Apart (Chinese: 當生命陷落時), ISBN 978-957-30163-1-1.
- Grace and Grit (Chinese: 恩寵與勇氣), ISBN 9576933803.
- Freedom, Love and Action (Chinese: 自由、愛、行動), ISBN 9576794412.
- The Only Revolution and The Urgency of Change (Chinese: 人類的當務之急), ISBN 9576790328.
- Krishnamurti: A Biography (Chinese: 克裡希那提傳), ISBN 9576791391.
- Exploration into Insight (Chinese: 般若之旅), ISBN 9579685436.
- Respect for Acting (Chinese: 尊重表演藝術), ISBN 957629116X.
- The Ending of Time (Chinese: 超越時空), ISBN 9579685681.

=== Film ===
Year	English title	Chinese title	Role	Notes
1986	Parking Service	代客泊車		
1986	Reunion	我們都是這樣長大的		
1985	Even the Sun Is Sobbing	太陽也哭泣		
1985		智勇三寶		
1983	That Day, on the Beach	海灘的一天		
1982		南十字星		
1982		酒色財氣		
1982		大手王		
1981	A Maiden and Wanderer	大小姐與流浪漢		
1981		帶槍過境		
1981	Say You Love Me	跟我說愛我		
1981		七月幽靈		
1980		鬼靈		
1979	Off to Success	成功嶺上		
1979		牆內牆外		
1979	The Legend of Six Dynasty	六朝怪談		
1979	Where Is My Home	何處是兒家		
1979		瀟瀟秋水寒		
1979		寧靜海		
1978	The Phoenix	無字天書		
1978		第二道彩虹		
1978	A Teacher of Great soldiers	黃埔軍魂		
1978		鸚鵡傳奇		
1978	Wild Flower In the Storm	花非花		
1978		你追她也追		
1977		秋詩篇篇		
1977	The Youthful Delinquents	發往追蹤		
1977		愛情大進擊		
1977	The True Love	真真的愛		
1977	The Brave Ones	強渡關山		
1977	Far Away From Home	人在天涯		
1976	The Star	星語		
1976	Warmth in the Autumn	溫暖在秋天		
1976	Heroes of the Eastern Skies	筧橋英烈傳		
1976		蝴蝶穀		
1976		小玲瓏		
1976		追入天地		
1976		佳期假期		
1976		我是一片雲		
1976	Golden Leaves	秋纏		
1975	Victory	梅花		
1975		海誓山盟		
1975	The Life God	雲深不知處		

=== Television ===
Year	English title	Chinese title	Role	Notes
1980	The Biography of Empress Dowager Cixi	慈溪外傳		
1980	Bihai Qingtao	碧海情濤		
1976	Daye Xiongfeng	大野雄風		

== Awards ==
Year	Work	Award	Result	Notes
1977	Far Away From Home	Golden Horse Award for Best Supporting Actress	Won	
