= Mayday 3DNA =

Mayday 3DNA (C: 五月天追夢3DNA, P: Wǔyuè Tiān Zhuī Mèng 3DNA) is a 2011 Taiwanese film directed by Wen Yen Kung (孔玟燕) with additional work from Charlie Chu (曲全立).

Within the pan-Chinese community it is the first 3D concert feature film. The film is about three fictional stories revolving around characters who wish to attend a concert in Shanghai from the band Mayday. Filming took two years and there was a production budget of $200 New Taiwan dollars. Post-production work took 17 months.

One story is set in Guangzhou, one story is set in Taipei, and one story is set in Shanghai.

== Cast ==
- Zhang Yujian
- Rene Liu
- Richie Jen
