= The Ultimate Winner =

2011 Singaporean film

- Malaysian theatrical release poster
- Traditional Chinese: 贏家
- Simplified Chinese: 赢家
- Hanyu Pinyin: Yíngjiā
- Directed by: Li Nanxing
- Screenplay by: Harry Yap
- Produced by: Harry Yap; Chan Yee Man
- Starring: Li Nanxing; Constance Song; Rebecca Lim; Chen Chao-jung; Dai Xiangyu
- Cinematography: Kenny Tse
- Edited by: Chan Yee Man; Zhao Danyao
- Music by: Lincoln Lo
- Production companies: Cornerstone Pictures; He Productions
- Distributed by: mm2 Entertainment
- Release date: 14 April 2011
- Running time: 101 minutes
- Country: Singapore
- Language: Mandarin

The Ultimate Winner (Chinese: 赢家) is a 2011 Singaporean Christian drama film directed by and starring Li Nanxing in his directorial debut. The film also stars Constance Song, Rebecca Lim, Chen Chao-jung and Dai Xiangyu. The film revolves around the struggles of a habitual gambler who is drawn into a life of pain by his gambling addiction. However, he is brought to a realisation through his religious wife and turns over a new leaf.

== Cast ==
- Li Nanxing as Shi Tiancai
- Constance Song as Honey Ma
- Rebecca Lim as Zhang Zhihui
- Chen Chao-jung as Li Guanjun
- Dai Xiangyu as Sky
- Zheng Geping as Datuk Ong
- Rayson Tan as Zheng Youyi
- Phyllis Quek as Zhang Zhifang
- Huang Shinan as Tiancai's father
- Chen Shucheng as Uncle Lim
- Chen Liping as Staff Sergeant
- Jiang Jiaxi as Manager
