= Chinese Culture and Movie Center =

Chinese Culture and Movie Center 中影文化城
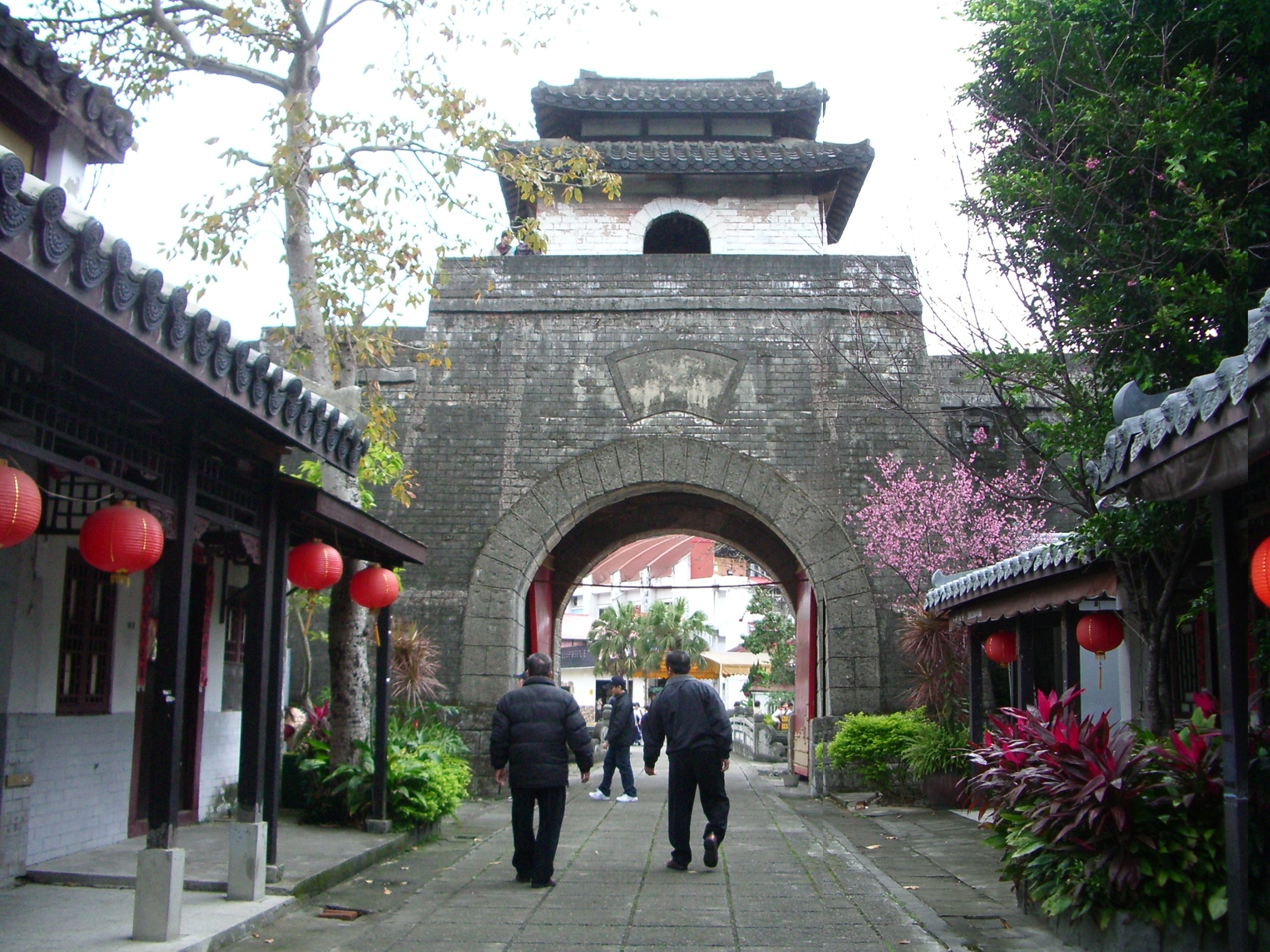
- Interactive map of Chinese Culture and Movie Center 中影文化城
- Location: Taipei, Taiwan
- Coordinates: 25°5′49.12″N 121°32′43.25″E
- Opened: 10 February 1975
- Owner: Central Motion Picture Corporation
- Website: http://www.movie.com.tw/

The Chinese Culture and Movie Center (Chinese: 中影文化城; pinyin: Zhōngyǐng Wénhuàchéng) is a former movie studio and tourist attraction located in the Shilin District of Taipei, Taiwan. It is owned by the Central Motion Picture Corporation. In its early period, it functioned as a film and TV drama filming location and studio. After the Republic of China government lifted martial law, many of the TV dramas and movies produced by the Center began filming in Hong Kong and mainland China. The Chinese Culture and Movie Center closed indefinitely in 2008.

== History ==
On 31 December 1974, the Central Motion Picture Corporation began construction of a studio in the Shilin District of Taipei adjacent to Soochow University and the National Palace Museum. The studio was built in imitation of classical Chinese architecture.

On 10 February 1975, the Chinese Culture and Movie Center officially opened to visitors.

On 28 February 2006, the Chinese Culture and Movie Center suspended business for internal renovations

On 26 July 2008, Taipei City Government resumed trial operation of the Chinese Culture and Movie Center. After the test operation and spending millions of NT Dollars, the park is closed indefinitely.

== Gallery of Images ==
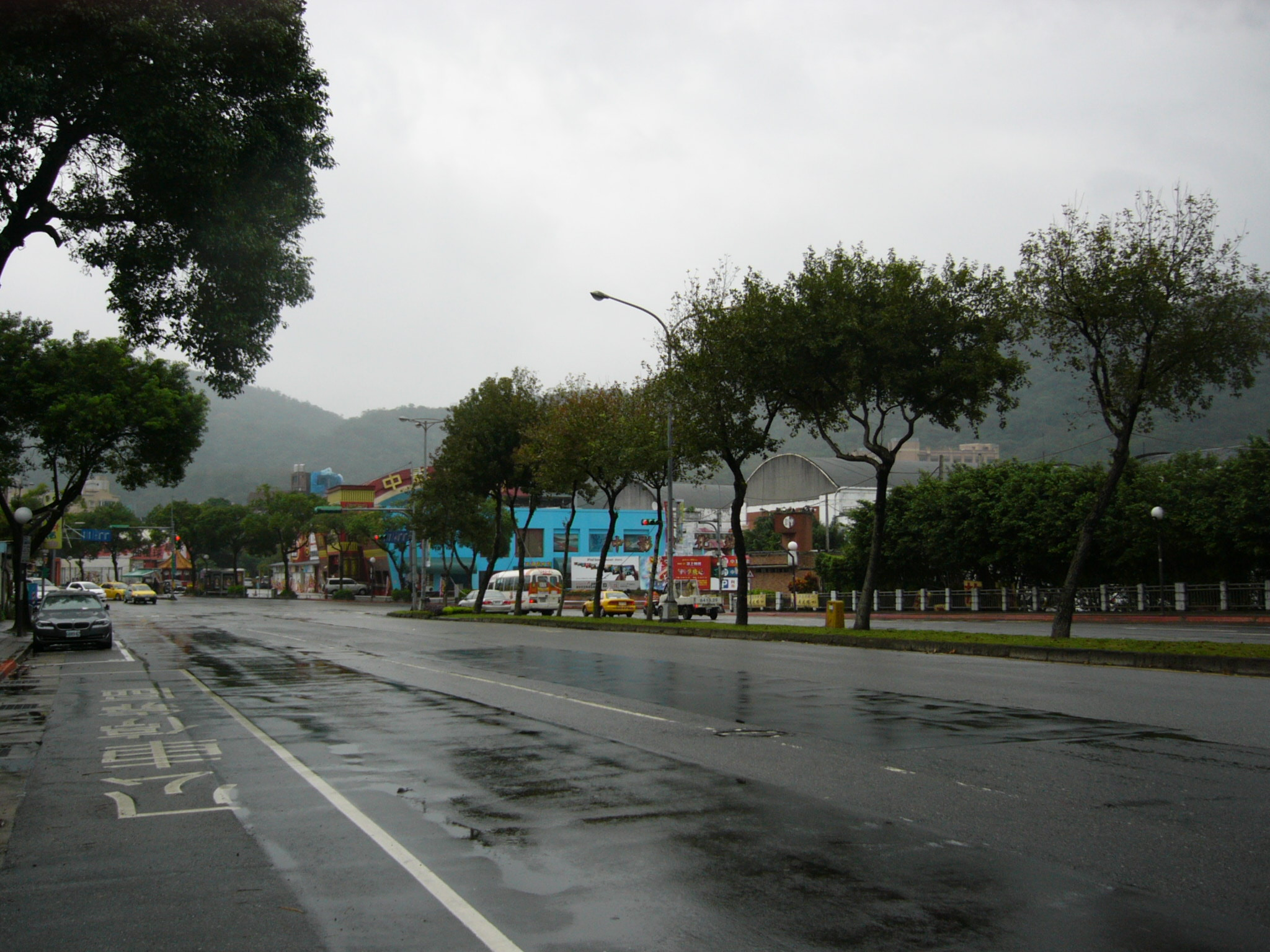
Overview

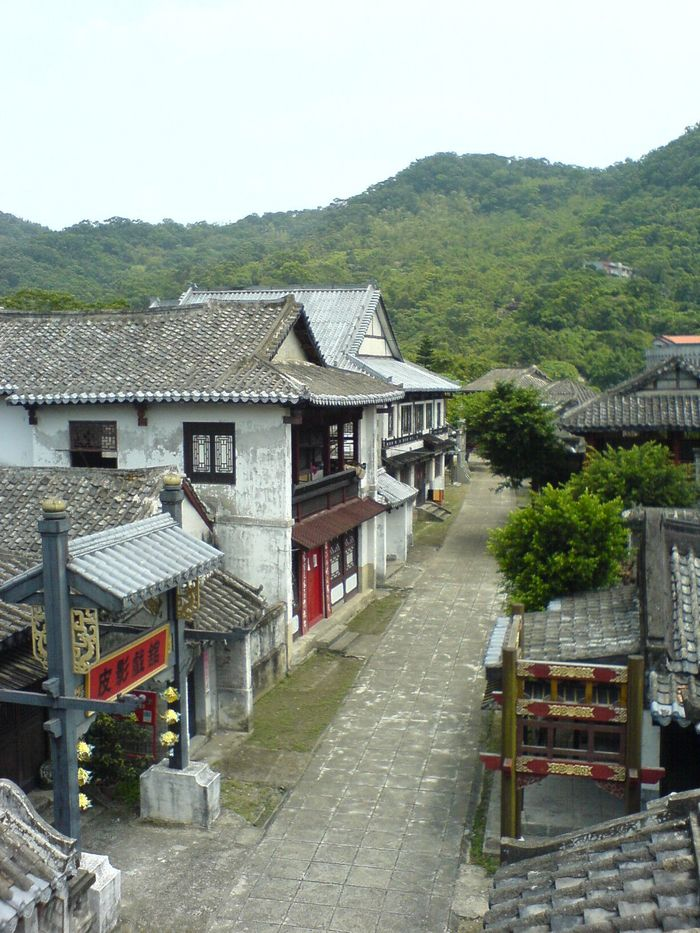
Reproduction of traditional Chinese street.

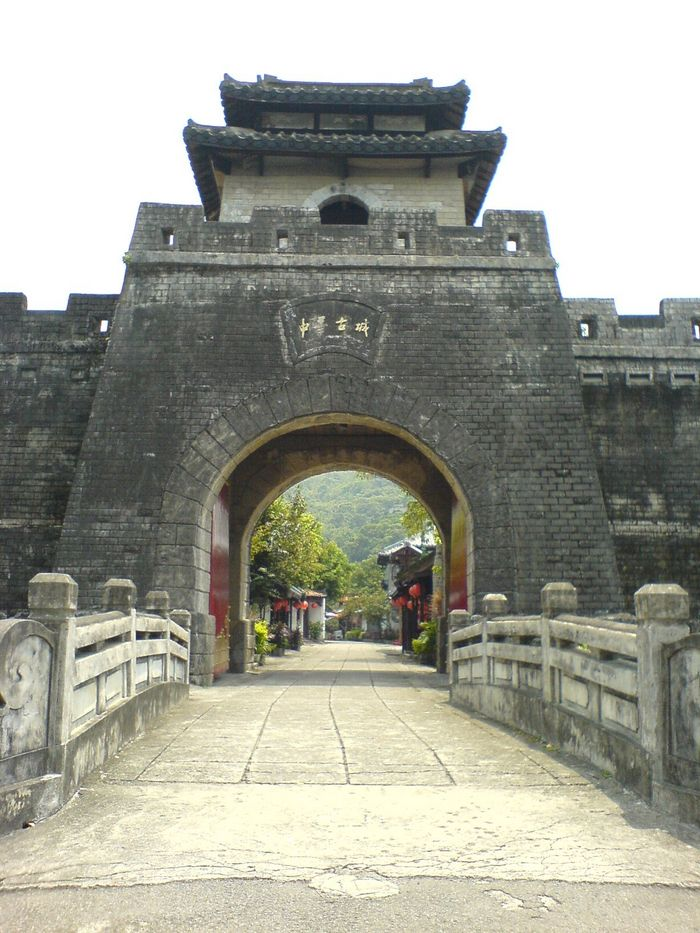
Reproduction of ancient Chinese gate.

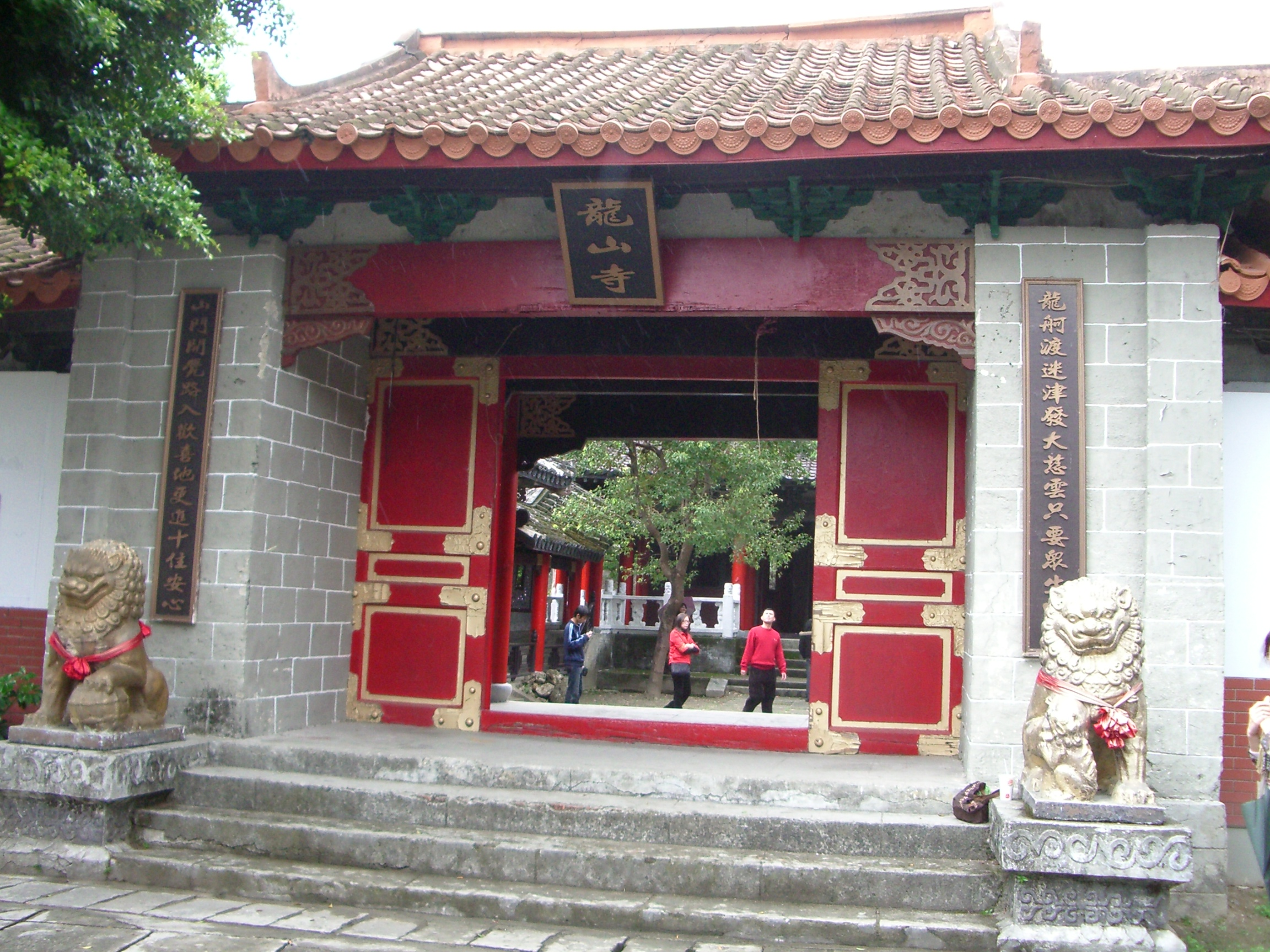
Reproduction of ancient Chinese Temple.

== See also ==
- Cinema of Taiwan
- Culture of Taiwan
- List of museums in Taiwan
- Sinicization
