= Rebels of the Neon God =

1992 film by Tsai Ming-liang

- U.S. DVD cover

Chinese name
- Chinese: 青少年哪吒
- Literal meaning: Adolescent Nezha
Transcriptions
Standard Mandarin
- Hanyu Pinyin: Qīngshàonián Nuózhà
- Wade–Giles: Chʻing^{1}-shao^{4}-nien^{2} No^{2}-cha^{4}
- Tongyong Pinyin: Cingshàonián Nuójhà
- Directed by: Tsai Ming-liang
- Written by: Tsai Ming-liang
- Produced by: Hsu Li-kong
- Starring: Wang Yu-wen; Chen Chao-jung; Lee Kang-sheng; Jen Chang-bin; Miao Tien; Lu Hsiao-ling
- Cinematography: Liao Pen-jung
- Edited by: Wang Chi-yang
- Music by: Huang Shu-jun
- Production company: Central Pictures
- Release date: December 1992 (Golden Horse Film Festival)
- Running time: 106 minutes 127 minutes (Canada)
- Country: Taiwan
- Languages: Mandarin; Hokkien

Rebels of the Neon God (Chinese: 青少年哪吒; pinyin: Qīngshàonián Nuózhà; lit. 'Adolescent Nezha') is a 1992 Taiwanese drama film written and directed by Tsai Ming-liang in his feature film directorial debut. It stars Wang Yu-wen, Chen Chao-jung, Lee Kang-sheng, Jen Chang-bin, Miao Tien, and Lu Hsiao-ling.

== Plot ==
A young man, Hsiao Kang (Chinese: 小康; lit. 'Little Kang', a nickname derived from Lee Kang-sheng's full name), attends a cram school and lives with his parents. In a parallel storyline, Tze and Ping are petty thieves. After a night out, Tze returns to his flooded apartment. The next morning, he meets Kuei, a young woman who had just had a one-night stand in the neighboring room with Ah Tze's brother, a car salesman. Kuei does not know where she is, and Tze gives her a ride on his motorcycle. Meanwhile, Hsiao Kang's motorcycle is impounded. His father, a taxi driver, spots him and gives him a ride to school. During an altercation in traffic, Tze intentionally breaks the side mirror on Hsiao Kang's father's taxi.

Tze, Ping, and Kuei hang out together at night and get drunk. Kuei passes out, and the two men leave her in a hotel room. In the morning, Kuei calls Tze and asks to see him again. Meanwhile, Hsiao Kang drops out of school and gets a refund. Rather than going home, he stays out, runs into Tze, and stalks him for a while. Hsiao Kang watches Tze and Ping rob an arcade by taking motherboards out of the machines.

Tze meets Kuei, who is angry that he stood her up. The two get a hotel room and have sex. Meanwhile, Hsiao Kang finds Tze's motorcycle and vandalizes it. He then tries to return home after being away for a few days, but his parents, who have discovered that he dropped out of school, refuse to let him in. He ends up staying in the same hotel where Tze and Kuei spent the night and watches gleefully as Tze discovers his trashed bike.

Later, Tze and Ping try to sell the motherboards to an arcade owner, but the men they stole from confront them, chase them into the street, and beat Ping up. That night, Tze brings Ping back to his apartment, by chance in Hsiao Kang's father's taxi. Kuei also shows up there. She tells Tze that she wants to go away with him, and the two embrace. Hsiao Kang's father drives back home, and he leaves the apartment door ajar. Hsiao Kang visits a phone dating service but does not answer any calls. After a few minutes, he leaves.

== Cast ==
- Wang Yu-wen as Ah Kuei
- Chen Chao-jung as Ah Tze
- Lee Kang-sheng as Hsiao Kang
- Jen Chang-bin as Ah Ping
- Miao Tien as Hsiao Kang's father
- Lu Hsiao-ling as Hsiao Kang's mother

== Production ==
Rebels of the Neon God was Tsai's first feature film. He had taken a liking to Lee Kang-sheng when the two worked together on a television film. At the time, Lee was studying for college entrance exams. Tsai later said, "It was by spending time with Hsiao Kang as he went through the whole experience that I decided that I wanted to make a simple film about a kid trying to get into college, which became Rebels of the Neon God. I wanted to explore what a kid would do if he couldn't get in. Where would he go? What would he do?"

=== Title ===
The film's Chinese title refers to Nezha (Nuozha in Taiwanese pronunciation), a powerful child god in Chinese classical mythology who was born into a human family. Nezha is impulsive and disobedient. He tries to kill his father, but is brought under control when a Taoist immortal (Nezha's spiritual mentor) gives the father a miniature pagoda that enables him to control his rebellious son. This resonates in the film a number of ways: Hsiao Kang's mother believes he is Nezha reincarnated, and Tze and Ping try to pawn off some stolen goods to an arcade proprietor named Nezha. Before the pawning of the stolen goods, Hsiao Kang vandalizes Tze's motorcycle and writes "Nezha was here" on the adjacent sidewalk.

== Reception ==
On review aggregator website Rotten Tomatoes, the film has an approval rating of 100% based on 32 reviews, with a weighted average of 8.55/10. The site's consensus reads: "Rebels of the Neon God announces writer-director Ming-liang Tsai as a fully formed talent—and remains one of the more accomplished debuts of the decade". On Metacritic, the film has a score of 82 out of 100 based on 10 reviews, indicating "universal acclaim".

In a retrospective review for The New York Times, A. O. Scott compared the film with Tsai's later work and wrote: "The camera movements are minimal and precise, turning what might seem like ordinary shots into sly jokes. There is water everywhere—torrential downpours sweeping the streets and a mysterious flood in a main character’s apartment. … Above all, there are performers who would become fixtures of this director's imaginative universe. Chief among them is Lee Kang-sheng, a slender, nearly silent man with a Keatonesque deadpan who has appeared in all 10 of Mr. Tsai's features so far."

=== Awards ===
The film won a Golden Horse Award for Best Original Score, a Prize of the City of Torino for Best Film at the Torino International Festival of Young Cinema, and the Bronze Award at the Tokyo International Film Festival.

== See also ==
- List of films with a 100% rating on Rotten Tomatoes
