= Crazy Romance =

1985 Hong Kong film by Tommy Leung

- Film poster
- Traditional Chinese: 求愛反斗星
- Simplified Chinese: 求爱反斗星
- Hanyu Pinyin: Qiú Ài Fǎn Dǒu Xīng
- Jyutping: Kau4 Ngoi3 Faan2 Dau2 Sing1
- Directed by: Tommy Leung
- Screenplay by: Wing-Scope Screenwriter Team
- Produced by: Alan Tang
- Starring: Natalis Chan; Sylvia Chang; Leslie Cheung
- Cinematography: Yuen Bing-tong
- Edited by: Mak Chi-tat
- Music by: Sherman Chow
- Production company: The Wing-Scope Co.
- Distributed by: Golden Harvest
- Release date: 1 August 1985
- Running time: 89 minutes
- Country: Hong Kong
- Language: Cantonese
- Box office: HK$3,735,388

Crazy Romance (求愛反斗星) is a 1985 Hong Kong romantic comedy film directed by Tommy Leung and starring Natalis Chan, Sylvia Chang and Leslie Cheung.

== Cast ==
- Natalis Chan as Hung Ka-po
- Sylvia Chang as Cheung Ka-ka
- Leslie Cheung as Leslie Cheung
- Siu Kwok-wah as Mak Chiu
- David Wu as Hui Koon-yan
- Charlie Cho as Prison Officer Lau
- Fung King-man as Killer Wahle
- Hoi Sang Lee as Prison guard in van
- Michelle Sze-ma as Ka-po's fake girlfriend
- Tam Chuen-hing as Officer Tam
- Ng Ha-ping as Monica
- Alan Chan as Piggy
- Lee Ka-ting as Ting
- Benz Kong as Gay pedestrian
- Wong Ying-kit as Gay pedestrian
- Shing Fui-On as Angry car driver
- Ha Miu-yin as Leslie's new interest in pub
- Shun Wai as Driving test
- Tommy Leung as Learner driver
- Chan Chuen as Traffic cop
- Ng Man-tat as Inspector at airport
- Yue Tau-wan as Man eyeing Ka-ka's wallet on the street
- Siao San-yan as Fortune teller
- Wong Nga-man as One of Leslie's girlfriend
- Chiu Jun-chiu as Biker challenging Ka-po
- Garry Chan as Piggy's thug
- Lee Yeung-to as Policeman chasing Ka-po in alley
- Fok Ka-lai as Policeman chasing Ka-po in alley
- Cheung Kwok-wah as Prisoner
- Lam foo-wai as Prisoner
- Fei Pak as Prison officer
- Alric Ma as Policeman
