= That Day, on the Beach =

- Film poster
- Directed by: Edward Yang
- Written by: Wu Nien-jen; Edward Yang
- Produced by: Raymond Wong; Wu Ching-Ling
- Starring: Sylvia Chang; Terry Hu
- Cinematography: Christopher Doyle; Chang Hui-Kung
- Music by: Violet Lam
- Production companies: Central Motion Picture Corporation; Cinema City Enterprises
- Release date: April 11, 1983 (Taiwan)
- Running time: 166 minutes
- Country: Taiwan
- Languages: Mandarin; German; Japanese; Taiwanese Hokkien

That Day, on the Beach (Chinese: 海灘的一天; pinyin: Hǎitān de yītiān) is a 1983 Taiwanese New Wave drama and the first feature film by Edward Yang. The film deals with two old friends, played by Sylvia Chang and Terry Hu, who encounter each other in Taipei. Yang had to convince the film's production company to allow Christopher Doyle to shoot the film; Doyle would go on to win the Best Cinematography prize at the 1983 Asia-Pacific Film Festival for his work on That Day, on the Beach. Yang's fellow Taiwanese New Wave director Hou Hsiao-hsien also plays a role in the film.

The film is sometimes cited as the first in the Taiwanese New Wave.

== Plot ==
The film opens with a radio announcement that pianist Tan Weiqing will be performing in her hometown of Taipei after being abroad for thirteen years. While preparing for her concert, Weiqing receives a message from an old friend Jiali, whom she has not seen since college. She reluctantly cancels an appointment with the press to have lunch and catch up.

After a hesitant introduction, their conversation initially centres on Weiqing and her decision to leave Taipei and study abroad after a failed romance with Jiali’s brother Jiasen, who was in love with Weiqing but forced into a marriage arranged by his father.

The conversation then turns to Jiali, who shares that she is married now by her own choice. After Weiqing left Taipei, she was introduced by a friend to Dewei, whom she fell in love with before he left for military service. After finishing college, Jiali left her family to live in Taipei with Dewei.

Dewei soon secured a position as a manager at a large corporation run by his college friend Ah-Tsai. They lived a comfortable life, but the demanding nature of Dewei’s work and social life left him with little time for their relationship, and Jiali began to feel neglected. Jiali made numerous attempts to rekindle their relationship, but Dewei resisted, pressured by Ah-Tsai to perform at work and by the romantic advances of a coworker, deepening the rift between them.

At lunch with Weiqing, Jiali reveals that, three years earlier, Dewei went missing and was presumed dead after his belongings were found abandoned on a beach.

Before his disappearance, Dewei faced further pressure to perform at work, while Jiali spent time with an old college friend and went on a date with a writer. After passing out one day in a flower arranging class, she ended up in the hospital, where she received flowers and a visit from Dewei. She began to grow optimistic that they could work things out, though she also had a premonition that Dewei was going through something.

During the investigation into Dewei’s disappearance, Ah-Tsai showed up and told Jiali that a large sum of money was missing from the company and that Dewei travelled to Japan two days earlier. He expressed bewilderment as to what happened and speculated that Dewei might still be alive.

Jiali visited her brother, who had taken over their father’s family clinic since he passed away. The practice was struggling due to advances in technology and the monopoly of resources in larger hospitals. They discussed their paths in life and the importance of self-reliance.

During the investigation on the beach, a body was found in the water, but Jiali left before discovering whose it was.

At lunch, seeing Jiali is emotional, Weiqing decides not to press Jiali on what the investigations turned up. Jiali receives a phone call for a work meeting, and the lunch ends. Outside the restaurant, Weiqing asks what happened to Jiasen, and it is revealed that he died of cancer the previous winter. The two friends say goodbye.

== Cast ==
- Sylvia Chang as Jiali
- Terry Hu as Tan Weiqing
- Hou Hsiao-hsien
