= Wang Yu-wen (Taiwanese actress) =

Taiwanese actress

- Born: 29 July 1971 (age 54) [Taiwan]
- Other names: 王渝文
- Occupation: Actress
- Years active: 1990-2005

Wang Yu-wen (Chinese: 王渝文; pinyin: Wáng Yúwén; born 29 July 1971) is a Taiwanese actress. She appeared in Tsai Ming-liang's 1992 film Rebels of the Neon God, which earned her the nomination for Best Leading Actress at the 29th Golden Horse Awards. She also starred in Ang Lee's 1994 film Eat Drink Man Woman.

== Selected filmography ==
=== Television ===
Year	Title	Chinese title	Role	Notes
1998	Cherish Our Love Forever	将爱情进行到底	Ruo Tong	
2000	Eldest Son's Daughter-in-law	長男的媳婦	Su Li-ling	
2001	Legendary Fighter: Yang's Heroine	杨门女将—女儿当自强	Lady Luo	
2002	Fiery Thunderbolt	台灣霹靂火	Lin Hsiu-ju	
2004	Taiwan Tornado	台灣龍捲風	Kao Wen-ling	
2008	JUSTICE FOR LOVE	天平上的馬爾濟斯	Shih Pi-yun	

=== FIlm ===
Year	Title	Chinese title	Role	Notes
1991	Five Girls and a Rope	五個女子和一根繩子	Ruo Tong	
1992	Rebels of the Neon God	青少年哪吒	A-kuei	
1994	Eat Drink Man Woman	飲食男女	Zhu Jia-Ning	
1995	Footsteps in the Rain	春花夢露	Kun Cheng-chi / A-hsiu	
