= Timmy Yip =

Hong Kong art director and designer

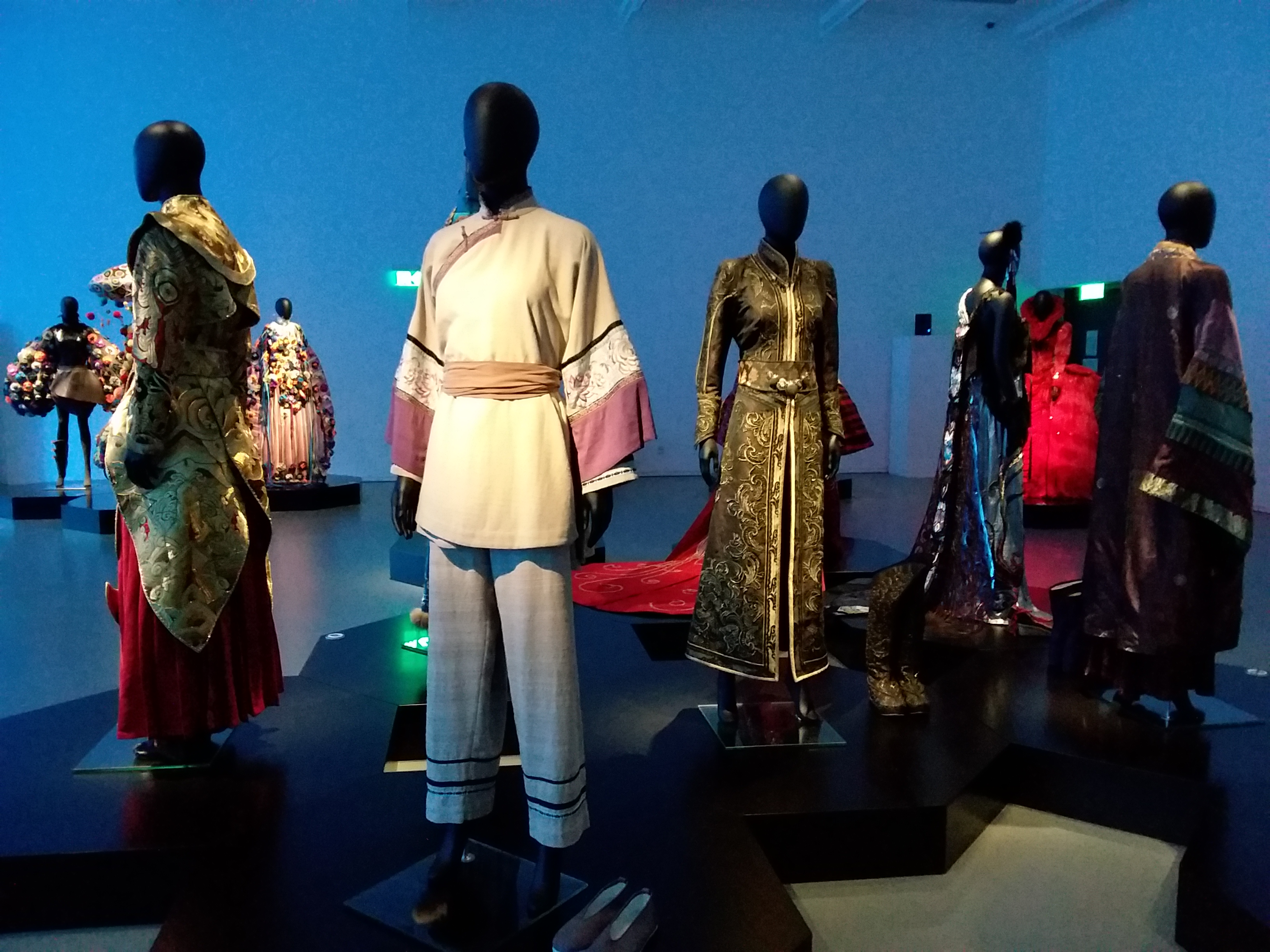
His art works

Timothy Yip Kam-tim (Chinese: 葉錦添; born 1967) is a Hong Kong art director and designer for fiction films. He is best known for his work on the 2000 martial arts film Crouching Tiger, Hidden Dragon, for which he won an Academy Award for Best Art Direction. Yip also won a BAFTA award for the film's costume design. He has been alternatively credited as Tim Yip Kam-tim, Kam Tim Yip, Kam-tim Yip, and Tim Yip.

== Biography ==
A renowned artist, Tim Yip has multidisciplinary works in costume design, visual and contemporary art. For his work in Crouching Tiger, Hidden Dragon, Tim won the Oscar for Best Art Direction and Costume Design in 2000 and he won the British Academy Film Award for Best Costume Design in 2000.

Tim graduated from Hong Kong Polytechnic with a degree in photography. Since working on his first film A Better Tomorrow directed by John Woo in 1986, he has accomplished costume designs and art direction for many film and theatrical performances over the past two decades. In addition to Woo, Tim has collaborated with other film directors of international acclaim such as Ang Lee, Tsai Ming Liang, Tian Zhuangzhuang, Li Shaohong, Stanley Kwan, Chen Kuo-fu, Chen Kaige, and Feng Xiaogang. Tim has also worked with many renowned Taiwanese theatrical groups such as Cloud Gate Dance Theatre, Contemporary Legend Theatre, Han Tang Yue-fu Dance Ensemble, Tai-Gu Tales Dance Theatre, and U Theatre, with performances that have toured China, Austria, France, the United States, the United Kingdom, and Singapore. His striking costume design and art direction for the theatre production Medea, television drama Oranges Turn Ripe, and feature films Temptation of a Monk and Double Vision have further attracted worldwide attention to his work.

In earlier works, Tim introduced his concept of the "New Orientalism" aesthetic, making him an important artist in helping the world understand the beauty of Chinese culture and arts. Since 2002, he has held many costume exhibitions such as Faces of the Time at the Taiwan National Palace Museum, Bourges Maison de la Culture in France and a special photography exhibition in Spain, conveying his interpretation of beauty in Oriental art to Western audiences. In 2004, Tim Yip was the art and costume director for the Beijing handover performance at the Olympic Games closing ceremony in Athens. In recent years, he has held various solo art exhibitions in New York, Beijing and Shanghai, and in 2005 he was invited by the John F. Kennedy Center for the Performing Arts to participate in the China Red exhibition. The Beijing Today Art Museum organized his solo art exhibition Illusions of Silence in late 2007. Tim has several publications including Lost in Time, Flower of the Wind, Floating, Circulation, Rouge: L’art de Tim Yip (published in both French and English), Illusions of Silence and Passage. He is the art director for a production of "The Dream of the Red Chamber," produced by the San Francisco Opera in September 2016.

Tim Yip was set and costume designer for the Metropolitan Opera's new production of "Lohengrin" that premiered in 2023.

Tin Yip also did the costume design and scenography for the Royal Danish Ballet's production of "Lady Mabeth" that premiered at the Royal Danish Theatre in Kobenhavn (Copenhagen) in 2026.
