= Jade Y. Chen =

Taiwanese novelist

- 陳玉慧
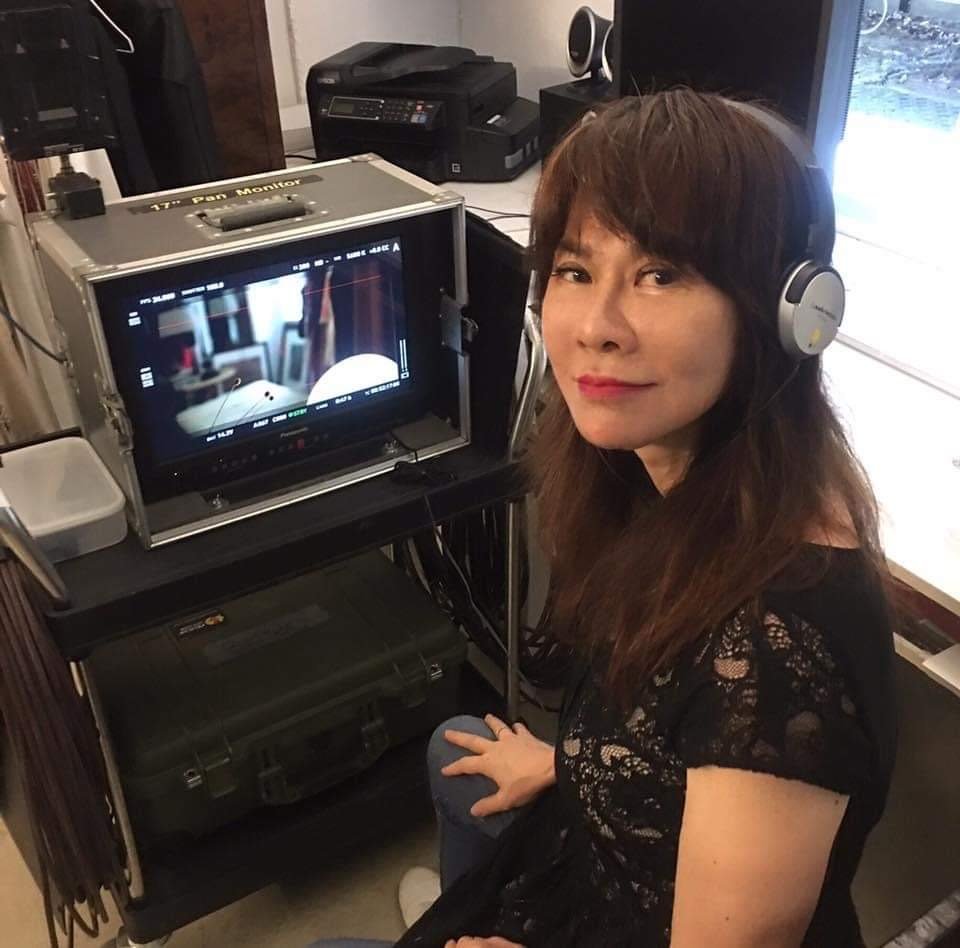
- Occupation: Novelist

Jade Y. Chen (Chinese: 陳玉慧; pinyin: Chén Yùhuì) is a novelist, journalist, theatre director and playwright from Taiwan. She is best known for her book, China, which won the Taiwan Golden Text Award (金典獎) for best novel and the Hong Kong Baptist University’s Dream of the Red Chamber Award Jury Prize.

== Professional career ==
Her 2004 bestselling novel Mazu's Bodyguards was adapted into a musical, presented at the National Theater in Taipei in December 2009. In Taiwan Today, it was described as a "bold attempt to explore Taiwan’s complex ethnic, cultural and political history".

Her works have been translated in German and English.
