= Chen Chao-jung =

Taiwanese actor and businessman

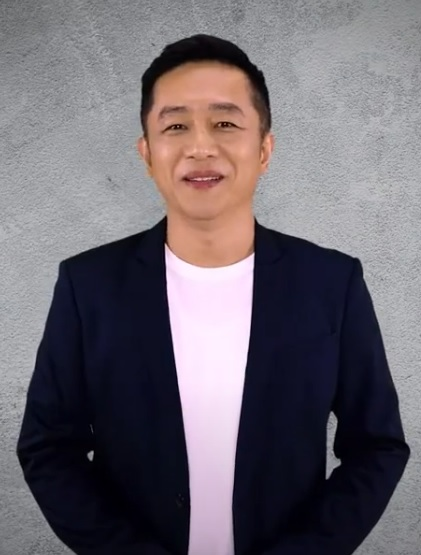
- Chen in September 2022
- Born: Yuli, Hualien, Taiwan
- Other name: Aaron Chen
- Education: St. John's & St. Mary's Institute of Technology
- Occupations: Actor, businessman
- Years active: 1980–present
- Spouse: Chang Ching-wen (m. 1995; div. 2020)
- Children: 2

Chinese name
- Traditional Chinese: 陳昭榮
- Simplified Chinese: 陈昭荣
- Hanyu Pinyin: Chén Zhāoróng

Chen Chao-jung, also known as Aaron Chen, is a Taiwanese actor and businessman.

He is known for starring in several of Tsai Ming-liang's films, including Rebels of the Neon God and Vive L'Amour. He is also considered a household name in Taiwan in the early 2000s as a television actor, starring in numerous long-running Taiwanese Hokkien series.

== Selected filmography ==
- The Ultimate Winner (2011)
- Comedy Makes You Cry (2010)
- 20th Century Boys 3: Redemption (2009)
- Face (2009)
- Goodbye, Dragon Inn (2003)
- What Time Is It There? (2001)
- Cop Abula (1999)
- The Personals (1998)
- The River (1997)
- Vive L'Amour (1994)
- Eat Drink Man Woman (1994)
- Rebels of the Neon God (1993)
- Year of the Dragon (1985)
- Blood of Dragon Peril (1980)
