= Sylvia Chang =

Taiwanese actress, writer, singer, producer and director

- 張艾嘉
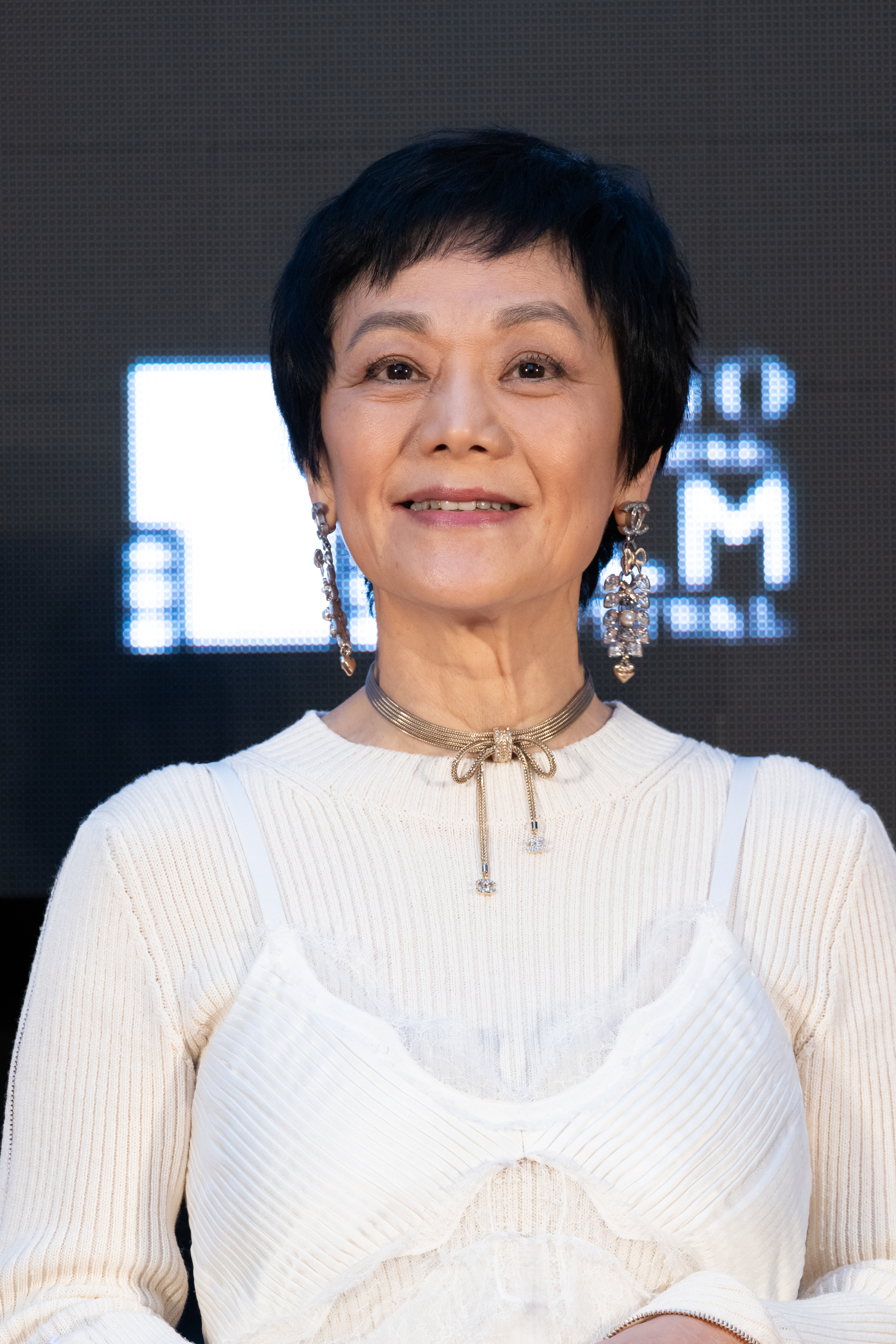
- Chang at the 37th Tokyo International Film Festival in October 2024
- Born: 21 July 1953 (age 73); Dalin, Chiayi County, Taiwan
- Other name: Zhang Aijia
- Occupations: Actress; writer; director; singer; producer
- Years active: 1973–present
- Spouses: Bob Liu (m. 1978; div. 1984) Billy Wang (m. 1991)
- Children: 1

Chinese name
- Traditional Chinese: 張艾嘉
- Simplified Chinese: 张艾嘉
- Hanyu Pinyin: Zhāng Àijiā
- Jyutping: Zoeng1 Ngaai6gaa1

Sylvia Chang (born 21 July 1953) is a Taiwanese actress, singer, director, screenwriter, and producer.

== Early life ==
Chang was born in Chiayi, Taiwan. She dropped out of school when she was 16 and started her career as a radio DJ. When she was 18 years old she acted in her first film.

== Career ==
Chang acted in her first film, The Tattooed Dragon (龍虎金剛) (1973), at the age of 18. Chang often attempted to do her own stunts in the four-part film series Aces Go Places.

She stated in an interview with film editor Clarence Tsui, "I still think Hong Kong's film industry is male-dominated". She also believes that "There aren't many male filmmakers who would write scripts for women". She helped write the script for Run Papa Run, based on the novel by Benny Li Shuan Yan, that follows a man who belongs to the Triad and the relationships he has with his mother, wife, and daughter. Chang said, "I thought why don't I explore the gentler side of men".

Chang first began performing in theatre productions more than 30 years ago. She returned to the stage in the production of Design For Living (華麗上班族之生活與生存) that premiered in November 2008 and went on into 2009. Chang stated in an interview, "The reason for me to take on a stage play again after 20 years is because I was lured by the director, he has invited handsome guys like Zheng Yuan Chang [sic] and David Huang into the play". Critics have remarked on the versatility in her roles along with her willingness to always try for something new.

Chang is also a singer and her music has become popular in karaoke, where her song "The Cost of Love" is commonly sung.

In the 1980s, the second film Chang directed, Passion, which she wrote and also starred in, won the Hong Kong Film Award for Best Actress. She has stated, "I never went to any school as a director or a filmmaker, so all my film education actually was from the set".

For a time, Chang was the head producer of New Cinema City in Taiwan, but she left a few years after joining. For 20 30 40, she not only played the 40-year-old woman protagonist but also wrote and directed it.

In 1992, she served as a jury member at the 42nd Berlin International Film Festival.

In August 2010, Chang joined the board of the Hong Kong International Film Festival Society as its vice-chair.

In June 2018, she was invited to become a member of the Academy of Motion Picture Arts and Sciences. In the same year, she served as a jury member at the 75th Venice International Film Festival.

=== Critical reception ===
Chang once said of her films that "I've always felt that animation or special effects shouldn't just be limited to science-fiction films and their ilk. Dramas can also play around with them". One critic wrote of her: "In an industry that kisses young actresses with celebrity, then swallows them and spits them out, Chang has a sequoia's longevity. She is the only Hong Kong actress of her generation -— the early '70s —-to keep starring in movies".

Chang's films have been selected to screen at the BFI London Film Festival, Toronto International Film Festival, Busan International Film Festival, and Tokyo Filmex. She has served as a jury member at the Berlin International Film Festival, as well as the Venice Film Festival. She also holds the record for the most nominations for the Hong Kong Film Award for Best Actress, with ten nominations and two wins.

At the 49th Toronto International Film Festival, Chang received an honourable mention from the Platform Prize jury for her performance in the film Daughter's Daughter—the first time in the history of the award that the Platform jury has recognized an individual performer. The film also earned Chang a nomination for Best Leading Actress at the 61st Golden Horse Awards.

== Personal life ==
Chang married Hong Kong-based journalist Bob Liu in 1979. They divorced in 1984. Chang married Taiwanese businessman Billy Wang Jing-xiong in 1991, and they have one son, Oscar. She also has two stepsons.

In July 2000, Chang's nine-year-old son Oscar was kidnapped and held for a ransom of HK $15 million. The police found him after a few days, safe, and arrested the kidnappers. Chang stated, "With your life, you have to move on, there's no other choice; so, out of no choice, then, it's a matter of your attitude".

=== Philanthropy ===
Chang is an advocate and a "life-long volunteer" for World Vision International, the humanitarian aid, development, and advocacy organization. She created an advertisement, sponsored by World Vision, to promote the company World Vision Advertisement on YouTube. She is a member of and advocate for the World Vision-sponsored "30 Hour Famine."

== Filmography ==
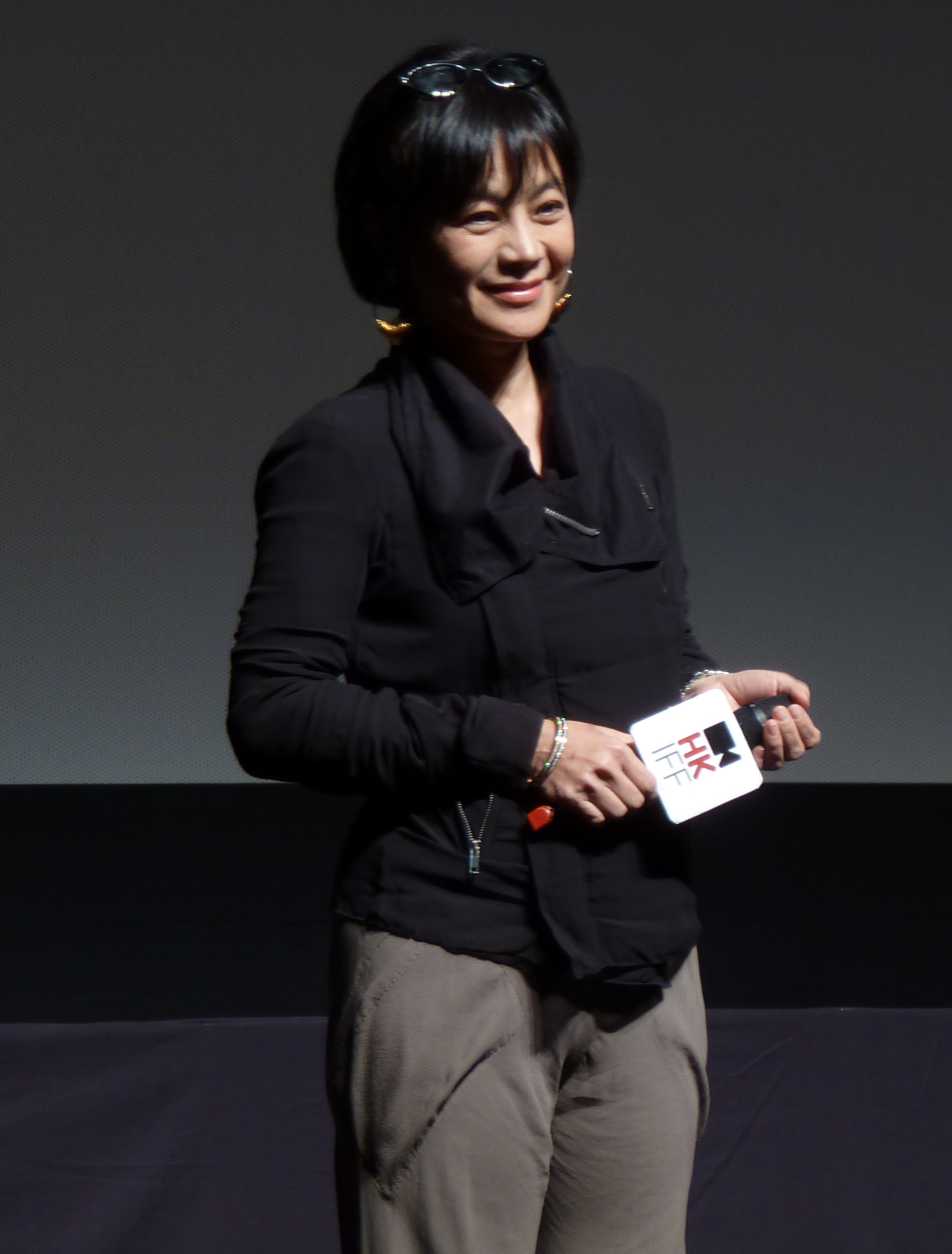
Chang at the 2011 Hong Kong International Film Festival

=== As actress ===
- Kong zhong wu shi (1973)
- The Tattooed Dragon (1973) as Ai-Chia
- Xiao ying xiong da nao Tang Ren jie (1974) as Lin Hsiu-yin
- Slaughter in San Francisco (1974)
- Shi qi shi qi shi ba (1974)
- Bruce: Hong Kong Master (1975)
- The Story of Four Girls (1975)
- A Mao zheng chuan (1976)
- Bi yun tian (1976)
- Victory (1976)
- Wen nuan zai qiu tian (1976) as Hsu Hsiao-hui
- Eight Hundred Heroes (1976)
- Warmth in Autumn (1976)
- Qiu chan (1976)
- Lang hua (1976)
- Xing yu (1976)
- Luo ye piao piao (1976)
- The Lady Killer (1976)
- Mitra (1977) as Mitra
- The Longest Bridge (1977)
- The Golden Age (1977)
- A Pirate of Love (1977)
- Zuo ri chong chong (1977)
- Qing se shan mai (1977)
- Shan liang de ri zi (1977)
- Tai bei qi qi (1977)
- Taibei liu shi liu (1977)
- Jin yu liang yuan hong lou meng (1977) as Lin Daiyu
- Feng yu zhao yang (1977)
- Dan dan san yue qing meng long (1977)
- Ai qing wo zhao dao le (1977)
- Shuo huang shi jie (1978)
- M*A*S*H (1979, TV Series) as Sooni
- The Secret (1979) - Lin Jeng-ming.
- Legend of the Mountain (1979) as Cloud
- Crazy Disaster (1979) as Lin Jeng-ming
- Ma feng nu (1979)
- Tian xia yi da xiao (1980)
- The Imperious Princess (1980) as Princess Sheng Ping
- White Jasmine (1980)
- Da xiao jiang jun (1980)
- Xue jian leng ying bao (1980)
- Yuan (1980)
- Attack Force Z (1981) as Chien Hua
- The Juvenizer (1981) as Chu Wei
- The Funniest Movie (1981)
- My Grandfather (1982)
- Aces Go Places (1982) as Supt. Nancy Ho
- Nan xiong nan di (1982)
- Xue jian gui xiang lu (1982)
- He Lives by Night (1982) as Sissy
- In Our Time (1982)
- Aces Go Places 2 (1983) as Supt. Nancy Ho
- 1938 Da jing qi (1983) as Su San
- Cabaret of the Streets (1983)
- That Day, on the Beach (1983) as Jiali
- Cabaret Tears (1983)
- Aces Go Places 3 (1984) as Supt. Nancy Ho
- Funny Face (1984)
- Shanghai Blues (1984) as Shu-Shu
- Double Trouble (1984)
- The Story in Sorghum Field (1984)
- My Favorite Season (1985) as Liu Xiang‑mei
- Crazy Romance (1985) as Cheung Ka-ka
- Ba Fan keng kou de xin niang (1985)
- Aces Go Places IV (1986) as Supt. Nancy Ho
- Lucky Stars Go Places (1986) as Quito
- Passion (1986) as Wendy Pai
- Immortal Story (1986) as Chang Mei Ling
- Sister Cupid (1987)
- Kidnapped (1987)
- Seven Years Itch (1987) as Sylvia
- Soursweet (1988) as Lily
- Yellow Story (1988) as Mrs. Hui
- Chicken and Duck Talk (1988) as Mrs. Hui
- All About Ah-Long (1989) as Sylvia Poon / 'Por-Por'
- Full Moon in New York (1989) as Wang Hsiung-Ping
- Eight Taels of Gold (1989) as Odds and Ends
- Two Painters (1989)
- The Fun, the Luck & the Tycoon (1990) as Hung Leung-yuk
- Queen of Temple Street (1990) as Big Sis Wah
- My Mother's Tea House (1990)
- A Rascal's Tale (1991)
- Sisters of the World Unite (1991) as Sylvia Lau
- The Banquet (1991) as Herself
- The Twin Dragons (1992) as Mrs. Ma (Twins' Mother)
- Lucky Encounter (1992) as Pregnant Woman
- C'est la vie, mon chéri (1993) as Deputy Director of Hospital
- Huan ying (1993)
- In Between (1994) as Anna Lau (segment "Yuan fu julebu")
- Eat Drink Man Woman (1994) as Jin-Rong
- Killer Lady (1995) as Show Show
- I Want to Go on Living (1995) as Pui Yan
- The Fragile Heart (1996, TV Series) as Dr. Zhao Quing
- A Chinese Ghost Story: The Tsui Hark Animation (1997) as Shine (Mandarin version, voice)
- The Red Violin (1998) as Xiang Pei (Shanghai)
- King of Stanley Market (1998)
- Tempting Heart (1999) as Cheryl
- Forever and Ever (2001) as Mrs. Tam Li Min-Chun
- 20 30 40 (2004) as Lily
- Rice Rhapsody (2004) as Jen
- American Fusion (2005) as Yvonne
- The Go Master (2006) as Shu Wen - Wu's mother
- Buddha Mountain (2010) as Chang Yueqin
- Mountains May Depart (2015) as Mia
- Office (2015) as Winnie Chang
- Shuttle Life (2017) as Li Jun
- Love Education (2017) as Qiu Huiying
- Long Day's Journey into Night (2018)
- Jìyuántái qihào (2019) as Mrs. Mei
- The Garden of Evening Mists (2019) as Older Teoh Yun Ling
- Are You Lonesome Tonight? (2021) as Liang's mother
- A Light Never Goes Out (2021) as Mei-heung
- Daughter's Daughter (2024)
- Ai's Kitchen (2024)

=== As filmmaker ===
Year	Title	Role	Notes
1981	Once Upon a Time	Co-director, co-writer	
1986	Passion	Director, writer	
1987	Yellow Story	Director	
1989	All About Ah-Long	Co-writer (story)	
1991	Sisters of the World Unite	Director, co-writer, producer	
1992	Mary from Beijing	Director, writer	
1992	Three Summers	Co-writer, producer	
1994	In Between	Director, writer, producer	also known as Conjugal Affairs or The New Age of Living Together; segment "Unwed Mother"
1995	Siao Yu	Director, co-writer	
1995	I Want to Go on Living	Co-writer	
1996	Tonight Nobody Goes Home	Director, co-writer	
1998	Bishonen	Executive producer	
1999	Tempting Heart	Director, co-writer	
2002	Princess D	Director, co-writer, producer	
2004	20 30 40	Director, co-writer	
2008	Run Papa Run	Director, co-writer	
2007	Happy Birthday	Co-writer	
2011	10+10	Writer	segment "The Dusk of the Gods"
2012	My Way	Executive producer	Documentary
2015	Murmur of the Hearts	Director, co-writer	
2015	Office	Writer	
2017	Love Education	Director, co-writer	
2021	Hero	Director	segment "Hong Kong"

== Discography ==
Kolin Records (歌林)

- 1973 Never Say Goodbye 別說再見
- 1974 Tearfully Say to You 含淚向你說
- 1977 Farewell (惜別)
- 1980 Maybe / We Were Young (也许 / 我們曾經年輕)

Rock Records

- 1981 Childhood (童年)
- 1985 Busy and Blind (忙與盲)
- 1986 Do You Love Me? (你愛我嗎)
- 1987 Xi shuo (細說), lit. "clarify" or "elaborate"
- 1992 The Price of Love (愛的代價)

== Awards and nominations ==
Year	Award	Category	Nominated work	Result
1976	13th Golden Horse Awards	Best Supporting Actress	Posterity and Perplexity	Won
1980	17th Golden Horse Awards	Best Actress	White Jasmine	Nominated
1981	18th Golden Horse Awards	Best Actress	My Grandfather	Won
1983	2nd Hong Kong Film Awards	Best Actress	Aces Go Places	Nominated
1985	4th Hong Kong Film Awards	Best Actress	Shanghai Blues	Nominated
1986	23rd Golden Horse Awards	Best Feature Film	Passion	Nominated
1986	23rd Golden Horse Awards	Best Director	Passion	Nominated
1986	23rd Golden Horse Awards	Best Actress	Passion	Won
1986	23rd Golden Horse Awards	Best Original Screenplay	Passion	Nominated
1987	6th Hong Kong Film Awards	Best Actress	Passion	Won
1989	26th Golden Horse Awards	Best Actress	Full Moon in New York	Nominated
1990	9th Hong Kong Film Awards	Best Actress	Eight Taels of Gold	Nominated
1990	9th Hong Kong Film Awards	Best Actress	All About Ah-Long	Nominated
1991	10th Hong Kong Film Awards	Best Actress	Queen of Temple Street	Nominated
1995	32nd Golden Horse Awards	Best Feature Film	Siao Yu	Nominated
1995	32nd Golden Horse Awards	Best Adapted Screenplay	Siao Yu	Nominated
1995	Asia-Pacific Film Festival	Best Film	Siao Yu	Won
1995	Asia-Pacific Film Festival	Best Screenplay	Siao Yu	Won
1996	33rd Golden Horse Awards	Best Feature Film	Tonight Nobody Goes Home	Nominated
1996	33rd Golden Horse Awards	Best Original Screenplay	Tonight Nobody Goes Home	Nominated
1996	Asia-Pacific Film Festival	Best Screenplay	Tonight Nobody Goes Home	Won
1999	1st Jutra Awards	Best Actress	The Red Violin	Nominated
1999	36th Golden Horse Awards	Best Feature Film	Tempting Heart	Nominated
2000	19th Hong Kong Film Awards	Best Director	Tempting Heart	Nominated
2000	19th Hong Kong Film Awards	Best Screenplay	Tempting Heart	Won
2001	38th Golden Horse Awards	Best Actress	Forever and Ever	Nominated
2002	7th Golden Bauhinia Awards	Best Actress	Forever and Ever	Won
2002	21st Hong Kong Film Awards	Best Actress	Forever and Ever	Won
2002	2nd Chinese Film Media Awards	Best Actress	Forever and Ever	Nominated
2002	Asian Film Critics Association Awards	Best Actress	Forever and Ever	Won
2004	41st Golden Horse Awards	Best Actress	Rice Rhapsody	Nominated
2004	54th Berlin International Film Festival	Golden Bear	20 30 40	Nominated
2005	24th Hong Kong Film Awards	Best Actress	20 30 40	Nominated
2005	5th Chinese Film Media Awards	Best Film	20 30 40	Nominated
2005	5th Chinese Film Media Awards	Best Director	20 30 40	Nominated
2005	5th Chinese Film Media Awards	Best Actress	20 30 40	Nominated
2005	Asian Film Critics Association Awards	Best Actress	20 30 40	Won
2005	Newport Beach Film Festival	Best Actress	Rice Rhapsody	Won
2006	25th Hong Kong Film Awards	Best Actress	Rice Rhapsody	Nominated
2007	26th Hong Kong Film Awards	Best Screenplay	Happy Birthday	Nominated
2008	45th Golden Horse Awards	Best Director	Run Papa Run	Nominated
2009	28th Hong Kong Film Awards	Best Screenplay	Run Papa Run	Nominated
2009	Hong Kong Film Critics Society Awards	Best Screenplay	Run Papa Run	Nominated
2010	47th Golden Horse Awards	Best Actress	Buddha Mountain	Nominated
2012	12th Chinese Film Media Awards	Best Supporting Actress	Buddha Mountain	Nominated
2015	52nd Golden Horse Awards	Best Actress	Office	Nominated
2015	52nd Golden Horse Awards	Best Adapted Screenplay	Office	Nominated
2016	35th Hong Kong Film Awards	Best Actress	Office	Nominated
2016	Hong Kong Film Critics Society Awards	Best Director	Murmur of the Hearts	Nominated
2016	Hong Kong Film Critics Society Awards	Best Screenplay	Murmur of the Hearts	Won
2016	Hong Kong Film Critics Society Awards	Best Actress	Office	Nominated
2016	16th Chinese Film Media Awards	Best Supporting Actress	Mountains May Depart	Nominated
2017	54th Golden Horse Awards	Best Feature Film	Love Education	Nominated
2017	54th Golden Horse Awards	Best Director	Love Education	Nominated
2017	54th Golden Horse Awards	Best Leading Actress	Love Education	Nominated
2017	54th Golden Horse Awards	Best Original Screenplay	Love Education	Nominated
2018	12th Asian Film Awards	Best Director	Love Education	Nominated
2018	12th Asian Film Awards	Best Actress	Love Education	Won
2018	12th Asian Film Awards	Best Screenplay	Love Education	Nominated
2018	12th Asian Film Awards	Lifetime Achievement Award	—N/a	Honored
2018	37th Hong Kong Film Awards	Best Director	Love Education	Nominated
2018	37th Hong Kong Film Awards	Best Actress	Love Education	Nominated
2018	37th Hong Kong Film Awards	Best Screenplay	Love Education	Won
2018	9th China Film Director's Guild Awards	Best Actress	Love Education	Nominated
2018	9th China Film Director's Guild Awards	Best Screenwriter	Love Education	Won
2018	9th China Film Director's Guild Awards	Best Hong Kong / Taiwan Director	Love Education	Won
2018	23rd Huading Awards	Best Director	Love Education	Nominated
2018	23rd Huading Awards	Best Actress	Love Education	Nominated
2018	29th Hong Kong Film Directors' Guild Awards	Best Director	Love Education	Won
2018	18th Chinese Film Media Awards	Best Actress	Love Education	Nominated
2018	18th Chinese Film Media Awards	Best Screenplay	Love Education	Nominated
2018	18th Chinese Film Media Awards	Best Director	Love Education	Nominated
2018	25th Beijing College Student Film Festival	Best Screenplay	Love Education	Won
2018	25th Hong Kong Film Critics Society Awards	Best Screenplay	Love Education	Nominated
2018	25th Hong Kong Film Critics Society Awards	Best Director	Love Education	Won
2022	59th Golden Horse Awards	Best Leading Actress	A Light Never Goes Out	Won
2023	29th Hong Kong Film Critics Society Awards	Best Actress	A Light Never Goes Out	Nominated
2023	41st Hong Kong Film Awards	Best Actress	A Light Never Goes Out	Nominated
2024	49th Toronto International Film Festival	Platform Award – Honourable Mention	Daughter's Daughter	Won
2024	61st Golden Horse Awards	Best Leading Actress	Daughter's Daughter	Nominated
2025	18th Asian Film Awards	Best Actress	Daughter's Daughter	Nominated
2025	27th Taipei Film Awards	Best Actress	Daughter's Daughter	Nominated
2025	30th Busan International Film Festival	Camellia Award	Women in film industry	Honoured
