= Bobby Chen =

Taiwanese singer

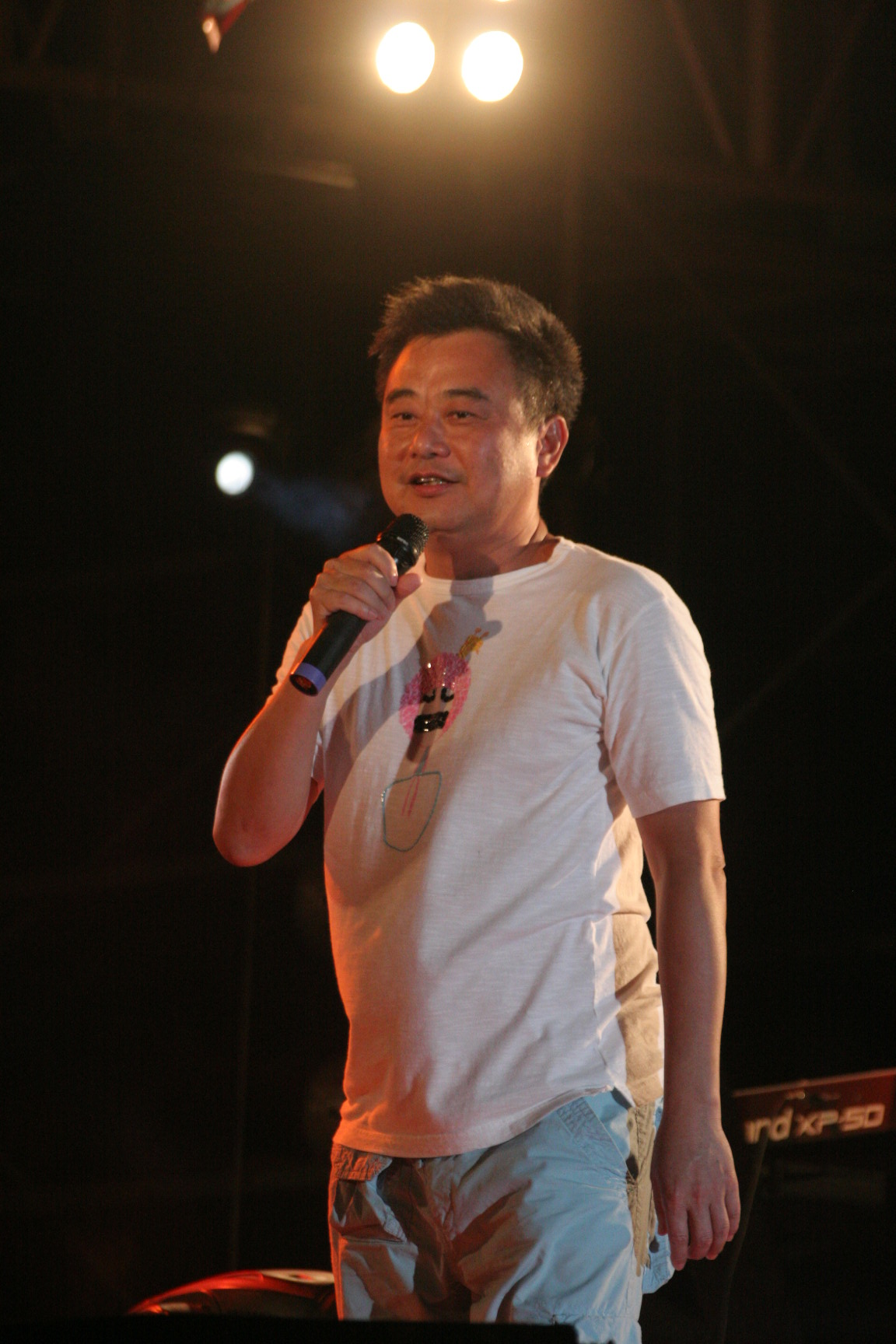
- Chen in 2008
- Born: 陳志昇; 29 October 1958 (age 67); Xizhou, Changhua County, Taiwan
- Occupations: Singer, songwriter, producer
- Years active: 1987–present

Chinese name
- Traditional Chinese: 陳昇
- Simplified Chinese: 陈升
Transcriptions
Standard Mandarin
- Hanyu Pinyin: Chén Shēng
- Musical career
- Origin: Taiwan
- Genres: Mandopop
- Instruments: Vocals; harmonica; guitar
- Label: Rock Records

Bobby Chen (Chinese: 陳昇; pinyin: Chén Shēng; born 29 October 1958) is a Taiwanese singer and record producer.

== Career ==
Chen was born in Xizhou, Changhua County in Taiwan. In elementary school, he was the only boy who took part in a singing competition and represented the entire school choir. When he was younger, he had wanted to be a painter. His interest in making music sparked much later in life. After he graduated, Chen moved to Taipei. There he engaged in multiple jobs like car repairing, elevator maintenance, art design and much more. He tried to enter Zhong Yi recording company (綜一唱片) three times. He finally got into the company after he changed his name. Chen began behind-the-scene production in the year of 1982. He work as Liu Chia-chang's assistant. After a few years, he decided to compose his own music. He finally made an entrance to Rolling Stone Records with the help of Xu Chongxian (徐崇憲), the owner of Li Feng Studios (麗風錄音室). In 1988, Chen released his first solo album entitled "Crowded Paradise".

Chen joined Huang Lianyu (Ayugo Huang) in 1992 and together they created New Formosa Band (Chinese: 新寶島康樂隊), composing songs in Taiwanese and Hakka. The duo introduced a third band member during the release the fourth album. Huang Lianyu left the group for some time and returned in 2011.

Chen has written many songs and has worked as a successful producer for many singers like Rene Liu (Chinese: 劉若英), Takeshi Kaneshiro and Richie Jen (Chinese: 任賢齊), to name a few. Chen has also written magazine columns, published novels, music books and has directed shows for MTV. He has a strong affiliation with environmental protection and public welfare activities. Since 2009, the music trio have held many concerts over the worlds and have been met with unanimous praise.

For 24 consecutive years (1994 – 2018), Chen used to perform on New Year's Eve every year as a tradition. In the beginning on 2019, Chen was diagnosed with mouth tumour. This brought a halt to his yearly performances.

== Controversial incidents ==
=== Assault on Chen ===
On 27 June 2002, Chen was at the Lai Kwai Fong Pub in Taipei. A guest at the adjacent table name Xiao Jiewen felt offended that Chen did not toast him after giving a speech. In a fit of anger, he grabbed a few wine bottles and iron kettles from other tables and smashed them on Chen's head. An ambulance was immediately called. Chen was sent to the nearby Cathay General Hospital for emergency treatment. A CT scan was performed and it was revealed that there was blood stasis in the brain. He was rushed to the operating room. Although his injury did not worsen, he went into a vegetative state. The court hearing for this incident went on for 5 years. During these hearings, Chen could only sign his name with his left hand.

=== Banned from China ===
On 11 May 2014, Chen expressed his thoughts and opposition against the Cross-Straits Service Trade Agreement. In an exclusive interview with Freedom Times, he stated that signing the agreement would make Taiwan "marginalized" and this would lower the "quality of life" of the Taiwanese population. He also added that he did not want mainlanders to visit Taiwan. Chen casually added that while he has a lot of mainland friends, he often tells them that he will talk about unity "when they learn to close bathroom doors". His statement was met with disappointment, anger and offence from mainland netizens. He was subsequently banned from performing live in mainland China. Sales of his CDs were also stopped. As a result, his works were banned from the majority of mainland Chinese streaming music platforms.

== Discography ==
=== Studio albums ===
- 3 May 1988 ─ 擁擠的樂園
- 18 April 1989 － 放肆的情人
- 14 September 1990 － 貪婪之歌
- 14 August 1991 － 私奔
- 20 November 1992 － 別讓我哭
- 2 September 1994 － 風箏
- 18 May 1995 － 恨情歌
- 12 July 1996 － Summer
- 17 July 1997 － 六月
- 30 July 1998 － 鴉片玫瑰
- 18 May 2000 － 思念人之屋
- 20 December 2001 － 50米深藍
- 21 October 2005 － 魚說
- 29 December 2006 － 這些人那些人
- 2 August 2007 － 麗江的春天
- 19 December 2008 － 美麗的邂逅
- 11 June 2010 － P.S.是的 我在台北
- 23 December 2011－ 家在北極村
- 18 October 2013 － 我的小清新
- 27 December 2013 － 延安的秋天
- 29 October 2015 － 是否，你還記得
- 1 September 2016 － 烏蘭巴托在遠方
- 14 July 2017 － 歸鄉
- 15 December 2017 － 南機場人
- 20 July 2018 － 華人公寓
- 7 December 2018 – 無歌之歌
- 25 October 2019 – 七天
- 9 December 2022 – Nostalgia

=== Live ===
- 25 June 2002 – My Destiny

=== Collections ===
- 26 April 1994 – 魔鬼的情詩
- October 1996 – Elle 特別專輯
- December 1997 – 24K
- 16 December 1998 – 魔鬼的情詩
- 26 December 2000 – 布魯賽爾的浮木之音樂故事
- 26 December 2003 – 魔鬼A春天
