= Lindzay Chan =

Lindzay Chan (Chinese: 陳令智) is a former chief dancer of the Hong Kong Ballet, and an actress in the Hong Kong cinema and theatre.

chan born in Hong Kong, her ancestral hometown is wenchang county, Hainan province.

Chan's grandfather was Chan Chak, an admiral of the Republic of China Navy.

As a long working partner of Hong Kong film director Evans Chan, she was named Best Actress at the Golden Horse Film Festival for her performance in To Liv(e) (1992) for the role of Rubie, who writes a letter to Norwegian actress Liv Ullmann against her criticism of Hong Kong's policy in expelling Vietnamese boat people.

== Filmography ==
- Datong: The Great Society (2011)
