= Hsu Li-kong =

Taiwanese film producer

Hsu Li-kong (Chinese: 徐立功; pinyin: Xú Lìgōng; born December 27, 1943) is a Taiwanese film producer. He is known for co-producing the successful wuxia film Crouching Tiger, Hidden Dragon (2000), which earned him an Academy Award nomination for Best Picture, a BAFTA Award for Best Film Not in the English Language, and an Independent Spirit Award for Best Film. He also won the Golden Horse Award for his work on the film Vive L'Amour (1994).

== Filmography ==
Producer
Year	Film	Association	Other notes
2011	Eat Drink Man Woman: So Far, Yet So Close	writer	filming
2011	Cha-cha for Twins	executive producer	pre-production
2010	Bei Yi Wang De Shi Guang	executive producer	(documentary)
2010	Great Wall Great Love	executive producer, producer	
2008	My So-called Love	producer	
2005	Fall... in Love	producer	
2004	Black Dog Is Coming	producer	
2002	Brave 20	producer	
2001	Human Comedy	producer	
2001	Migratory Bird	producer	
2000	Ye ben	producer, director	
2000	Ren jian si yue tian	producer	TV mini-series
2000	Crouching Tiger, Hidden Dragon	producer	
1998	Ai qing lai le	producer	
1998	The Personals	producer, supervising producer	
1997	Mei li zai chang ge	producer	
1997	The River	producer	
1997	Hong shi zi	producer	
1997	Fang lang	producer	
1996	Tonight Nobody Goes Home	producer	
1996	Fei tian	producer	
1996	Chun hua meng lu	producer	
1996	In a Strange City	producer	
1995	Wo de mei li yu ai chou	producer	
1995	Shao nu xiao yu	producer	
1995	Re dai yu	consulting producer	
1995	Kangaroo Man	executive producer	
1994	Vive L'Amour	producer	
1994	Eat Drink Man Woman	producer	
1994	In Between	producer	
1993	Rebels of the Neon God	producer	
1993	The Wedding Banquet	associate producer	
1992	Pushing Hands	executive producer	
1991	Wawa	producer	
