= Central Motion Picture Corporation =

Taiwanese film studio

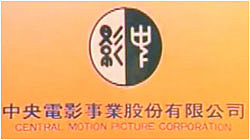
- Logo in 1950s and currently in use

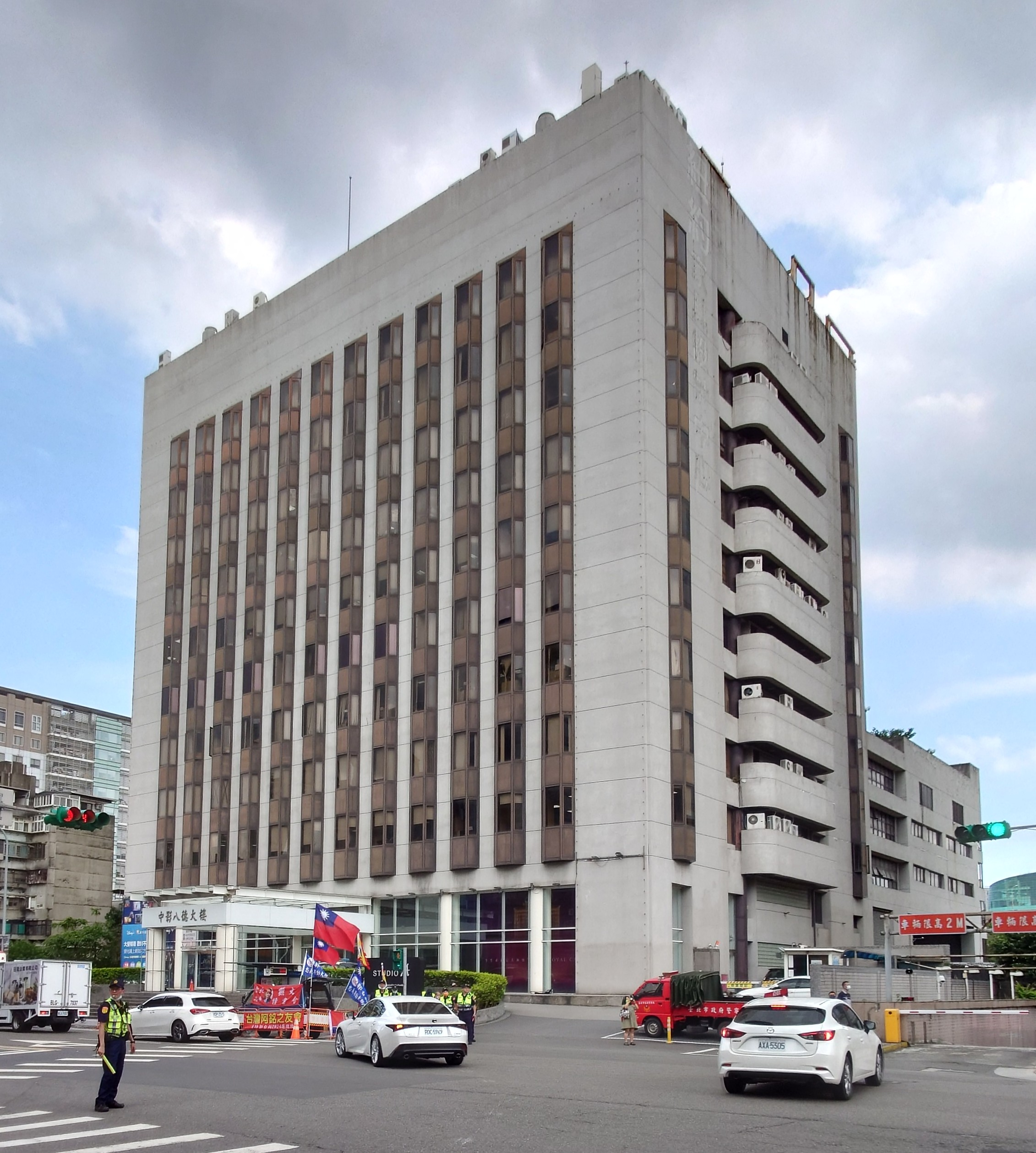
- CMPC's headquarters
- Native name: 中影股份有限公司
- Type: Private
- Industry: Film production
- Predecessor: Taiwan Film Corporation Limited; Agricultural Education Film Company
- Founded: 1 September 1954
- Headquarters: Taipei, Taiwan
- Website: www.movie.com.tw

Central Motion Picture Corporation (Chinese: 中影股份有限公司; pinyin: Zhōngyǐng Gǔfèn Yǒuxiàn Gōngsī), or CMPC (Chinese: 中影), is a film production company in Taiwan. Established in 1954 through merging two film companies, CMPC was once a state-controlled media which made films that closely aligned with government's policies, at a time when Kuomintang was the sole ruling party, until it was sold by the party in 2005. It remains one of the largest movie companies in Taiwan, having produced numerous notable films.

== History ==
=== Pre-merger ===
After the end of World War II and the end of Japanese colonial rule in Taiwan, 19 movie theatres operated by the Japanese were taken over by the propaganda commission under the Chief Executive Office of Taiwan Province, and then Taiwan party branch of the Kuomintang. On 1 October 1947, Taiwan Film Corporation Limited (臺灣電影事業股份有限公司) was established to distribute films and operate the theatres that were transferred to the company. The company was officially registered on 13 November 1953.

Meanwhile, the Agricultural Education Film Company was founded in March 1946 to promote education in the countryside. It was relocated to Taipei in August 1949 from Nanjing, and became the most developed movie production company in Taiwan, as well as the first publicly owned. A studio was built in Taichung at the site of the former residence of Matsuo Okawa, president of Taiwan News during the colonial period. Agricultural Educational Film Company began its film production and made its first feature film, Nightmare Awakening (惡夢初醒), in collaboration with the China Film Studio.

=== Incorporation ===
The two companies began discussing a merger in August 1954, hoping to support domestic film production with boxoffice revenue. Chiang Ching-kuo and Hsieh Tung-min, later President and Vice-Preseident of Taiwan, were amongst those involved in the discussion. The Agricultural Educational Film Company and Taiwan Film Corporation officially merged on 1 September 1954 as Central Motion Picture Corporation. Tai An-kuo served as the first chairman, and Li Ye (李葉) as the first president. Shortly afterwards, Li brought back the 35mm film equipment from Hong Kong that was ordered from the United States in 1949. Later that year, CMPC released its debut feature film, By the Hillside (梅崗春回), followed by its first commissioned film Shan Di Gu Niang (山地姑娘) on 1 October 1955. CMPC began filiming Taiwanese language films in 1956, such as Craving for the Spring Wind (望春風). CMPC moved their new studio to Shilin, Taipei in 1960, after the fire a year ago burnt down their Taichung studio. In the early 1960s, CMPC also strengthened their collaboration with Japanese film industry.

CMPC's initial foray into color film production began with the production of Oyster Girl in 1963, which earned the Best Drama Award at the Asia Pacific Film Festival. This film not only marked the inception of CMPC's "Healthy Realism" approach but also paved the way for a new era in Taiwan cinema and presented a fresh cultural identity to the global audience. In 1972, Koo Chen-fu became the chairman and planned to establish a new studio. In January 1975, Chinese Culture and Movie Center was completed, occupying an area of 16,000 square meters. It was the largest professional outdoor shooting base in Asia at that time. CMPC made a series of patriotic films in the 1970s, when Taiwan suffered devastating setbacks of foreign relations, including the expel from the United Nations in 1975. Most of these films depict national heroes or heroic actions taken by soldiers or ordinary people against the Japanese during World War II, such as Everlasting Glory (1974), Victory (梅花; 1976), and Eight Hundred Heroes (1976). Starting in 1982, CMPC began to produce small-budgeted films about contemporary life instead of genre films. Films such as In Our Time (1982), That Day on the Beach (1983), Growing Up (1983), The Sandwichman (1983), and Looking out at the Sea (看海的日子; 1984), etc., and helped create the new wave of New Taiwan Cinema.

=== Present ===
Under the Chen Shui-bian administration, in 2005, Kuomintang sold its shares of CMPC to the holding company of China Times, ending the KMT-era of the company. It then suspended their production until 2009 when Gou Tai-chiang succeeded as the chairman of the new CMPC. The company abbreviated its Chinese name from "中央電影事業股份有限公司" to its current form of "中影股份有限公司", and the post-production center was restored. The new company revitalized the original film resources and restored the existing film post-production center by upgrading to digital photography, Dolby recording, digital editing, and digital printing, while placing all of its 947 films to the Chinese Taiwan Film and Audiovisual Institute for preservation. It invested in and produced many films, including Jump Ashin! (2011), Seediq Bale (2011), Girlfriend Boyfriend (2012), Zone Pro Site (2013), KANO (2014), and The Assassin (2015).

In July 2019, the Taiwan Studio City in Wufeng, Taichung was revamped into the "Central Taiwan Film Studios", which became the largest indoor soundstage and the only water tank shooting facility in Taiwan. It is operated by the Taichung City Government through a public-private partnership, with CMPC acquiring 15-year operation rights. In August 2021, CMPC and the Ill-gotten Party Assets Settlement Committee signed an administrative settlement agreement, where CMPC would pay NT$950 million to the government for the understated assets of the company when it was sold in 2005. The copyrights of the 330 Taiwan films it owned were transferred to National Development Council and then donated to Taiwan Film and Audiovisual Institute in 2023.

CMPC operates two cinemas throughout Taiwan, Pingtung Cinema (Chinese: 屏東影城) and Taipei Wonderful Theatre (Chinese: 台北真善美劇院). Blossom Cinema (Chinese: 梅花數位影院) and Tainan Wonderful Theatre (Chinese: 台南真善美劇院) were closed in 2024 and 2025. Its film and television production studio is still in operation, although the cultural theme park closed in 2015.

== Leadership ==
| Chaiman | Years | President |
|---|---|---|
| Tai An-kuo | 1953–1958 | Li Ye (李潔) |
| Tai An-kuo | 1958–1959 | Wang Shin-jou (王星舟) |
| Shen Chi | 1959–1961 | Li Jie (李潔) |
| Tsai Meng-jian (蔡孟堅) | 1961–1963 | Li Jie (李潔) |
| James Shen | 1963–1965 | Gong Hong (龔弘) |
| Hu Chien-chung | 1965–1972 | Gong Hong (龔弘) |
| Koo Chen-fu | 1972–1977 | Mei Chang-ling (梅長齡) |
| Koo Chen-fu | 1977–1984 | Ming Ji |
| Koo Chen-fu | 1984–1990 | Lin Teng-fei (林登飛) |
| Koo Chen-fu | 1990–1995 | Jiang Feng-chyi (江奉琪) |
| Koo Chen-fu | 1995–1996 | Hsu Li-kong |
| Koo Chen-fu | 1996–1999 | Chiu Shun-ching (邱順清) |
| Yeh Qian-zhao (葉潛昭) | 1999–2006 | Chiu Shun-ching (邱順清) |
| Alex Tsai | 2006–2007 | Chiu Shun-ching (邱順清) |
| Lin Li-chen | 2007–2009 | Chiu Shun-ching (邱順清) |
| Gou Tai-chiang | 2009–2010 | Chiu Shun-ching (邱順清) |
| Gou Tai-chiang | 2010–? | Lin Kun-huang (林坤煌) |
