= Chen Kuo-fu =

Taiwanese film director

- Born: 13 May 1958 (age 68); Taiwan
- Occupations: Film director Screenwriter; Film producer
- Years active: 1989-present

Chinese name
- Traditional Chinese: 陳國富
- Simplified Chinese: 陈国冨
Transcriptions
Standard Mandarin
- Hanyu Pinyin: Chén Guófù

Chen Kuo-fu (born 13 May 1958) is a Taiwanese film director, screenwriter and producer. His film The Personals was screened in the Un Certain Regard section at the 1999 Cannes Film Festival.

== Biography ==
Born in 1958, Chen worked as a film critic before debuting as a director in 1989 with School Girl. In the 1990s, he continued to explore the female perspective with Treasure Island, The Peony Pavilion (inspired by traditional drama of the same name) and anti-romantic comedy The Personals. The latter, in which a single woman searches for Mr. Right on a series of blind dates, screened in Cannes' Un Certain Regard sidebar and was distributed in Asia, Europe and North America.

In 2000, Chen became the head of the production unit of the Asian branch of Columbia Pictures. Here he accumulated experience in international film making and connections to young Chinese directors such as Feng Xiaogang. Later, he would join Huayi Brothers Media Corporation and continue his work in China.

In 2001, Chen began to concentrate on feature film production beginning with Su Chao-Bin's youth comedy Better Than Sex through his company Nan Fang Film Productions. The following year, he directed and produced the supernatural thriller Double Vision. The film was distributed internationally by co-producer Columbia Pictures.

In 2009, Chen served as an executive producer of China's then highest grossing domestic film of all time, Feng Xiaogang's romantic drama If You Are the One. He became the first Chinese director to earn more than 1 billion yuan in the box office.

== Filmography ==
- School Girl (1989)
- Treasure Island (1993)
- The Peony Pavilion (1996) (Chinese: 我的美麗與哀愁; pinyin: Wǒ de měilì yǔ āichōu)
- The Personals (1998)
- Double Vision (2002)
- The Message (2009 - co-dir: Gao Qunshu
- Detective Dee and the Mystery of the Phantom Flame (2010 - writer only)
- Young Detective Dee: Rise of the Sea Dragon (2013 - writer and producer only)
- Detective Dee: The Four Heavenly Kings (2018 - producer only)
- The Yinyang Master (2021 - producer only)
