= List of Taiwanese films of the 1990s =

This is a list of films produced in Taiwan ordered by year of release. For an alphabetical list of Taiwanese films see Category:Taiwanese films

== 1990 ==
Title	Director	Cast	Genre	Notes
A Home Too Far	Kevin Chu	Tou Chung-hua, Andy Lau	drama/war	Based on a novel by Bo Yang
Island of Fire	Kevin Chu	Jackie Chan, Andy Lau, Sammo Hung, Tony Leung Ka-fai, Jimmy Wang Yu	Action	
Peony Birds	Huang Yu-shan		Drama	

== 1991 ==
Title	Director	Cast	Genre	Notes
A Brighter Summer Day	Edward Yang	Chang Chen, Elaine Jin	drama	
Island of Fire	Kevin Chu	Jackie Chan, Sammo Hung		

== 1992 ==
Title	Director	Cast	Genre	Notes
Dust of Angels	Hsu Hsiao-ming	Jack Kao	drama/crime	Executive produced by Hou Hsiao-hsien, Screened at the 1992 Cannes Film Festival
Pushing Hands	Ang Lee	Sihung Lung	drama	
Rebels of the Neon God	Tsai Ming-liang	Lee Kang-sheng, Chen Chao-jung	drama	Tsai's first full-length feature film
Hill of No Return	Wang Tung	Huang ping-yuan, Kuei-mei Yang, Wen Ying	drama	Won the Best Film at Golden Horse Awards and the Golden Goblet Award for Best Feature Film at Shanghai International Film Festival
Secret Love in Peach Blossom Land	Stan Lai	Brigitte Lin	drama	

== 1993 ==
Title	Director	Cast	Genre	Notes
The Wedding Banquet	Ang Lee	Winston Chao, Sihung Lung	drama	Won the Golden Bear at the 43rd Berlin International Film Festival, and nominated for the 1993 Academy Award for Best Foreign Language Film
The Puppetmaster	Hou Hsiao-hsien	Lim Giong, Li Tian-lu	drama/biography	Jury Prize at Cannes

== 1994 ==
Title	Director	Cast	Genre	Notes
A Confucian Confusion	Edward Yang	Chen Shiang-chyi	drama/comedy	Entered into the 1994 Cannes Film Festival
Eat Drink Man Woman	Ang Lee	Sihung Lung, Chien-lien Wu, Kuei-mei Yang, Chen Chao-jung	drama/comedy	Entered into the 1994 Academy Award for Best Foreign Language Film
Vive L'Amour	Tsai Ming-liang	Lee Kang-sheng, Chen Chao-jung, Kuei-mei Yang	drama	Won the Golden Lion award at the 1994 Venice Film Festival
A Borrowed Life	Wu Nien-jen	Tsai Chen-nan	drama	Executive produced by Hou Hsiao-hsien, won the Best Film at the 1994 Torino Film Festival
The Red Lotus Society	Stan Lai		drama	

== 1995 ==
Title	Director	Cast	Genre	Notes
Good Men, Good Women	Hou Hsiao-hsien	Annie Shizuka Inoh, Lim Giong, Jack Kao, Tsai Chen-nan	drama	Taiwan-Japan co-production; Entered into the 1995 Cannes Film Festival, won the Best Director at Golden Horse Awards
Siao Yu	Sylvia Chang	Rene Liu, Marj Dusay, Tou Chung-hua	drama	Won the Best Film at the Asia-Pacific Film Festival
Super Citizen Ko	Wan Jen			
Tropical Fish	Chen Yu-hsun	Lin Cheng-sheng, Wen Ying	drama/comedy	Nominated for a Golden Leopard at the Locarno International Film Festival

== 1996 ==
Title	Director	Cast	Genre	Notes
Goodbye South, Goodbye	Hou Hsiao-hsien	Jack Kao, Lim Giong, Annie Shizuka Inoh	drama	Taiwan-Japan co-production; Entered into the 1996 Cannes Film Festival
Mahjong	Edward Yang	Chang Chen, Virginie Ledoyen, Wu Nien-jen, Lawrence Ko, Tang chong-sheng, Chang Kuo-shu	drama/comedy	Won an Honourable Mention at the 46th Berlin International Film Festival
Red Persimmon	Wang Tung		drama	
Buddha Bless America	Wu Nien-jen		drama	Entered into Venice Film Festival

== 1997 ==
Title	Director	Cast	Genre	Notes
Wolves Cry Under the Moon	Ho Ping	Annie Shizuka Inoh, Shih Chang		
The River	Tsai Ming-liang	Lee Kang-sheng, Chen Chao-jung, Lu Yi-ching, Chen Shiang-chyi	drama	Won the Silver Bear - Special Jury Prize at the 47th Berlin International Film Festival
Sweet Degeneration	Lin Cheng-sheng			Entered into the 48th Berlin International Film Festival
Love Go Go	Chen Yu-hsun		drama/comedy	Screened at the Tokyo International Film Festival
Yours and Mine	Shaudi Wang			

== 1998 ==
Title	Director	Cast	Genre	Notes
Flowers of Shanghai	Hou Hsiao-hsien	Tony Leung Chiu-Wai, Carina Lau, Hada Michiko, Jack Kao, Annie Shizuka Inoh	drama	Asia-Pacific Film Festival, entered into Cannes
Heavenly Legend
The Hole	Tsai Ming-liang	Lee Kang-sheng, Kuei-Mei Yang	drama/musical	Entered into the 1998 Cannes Film Festival
The Personals	Chen Kuo-fu	Rene Liu, Chen Chao-jung, Wu Bai	drama/comedy	Screened at the 1999 Cannes Film Festival
Jam	Yiwen Chen		drama/comedy	Won the Special mention award at the Vancouver International Film Festival
Grandma and Her Ghosts	Wang Shau-di		drama/comedy	Full-length animated film

== 1999 ==
Title	Director	Cast	Genre	Notes
March of Happiness	Lin Cheng-sheng	Lim Giong, Doze Niu	drama	Screened at the 1999 Cannes Film Festival
Darkness and Light	Chang Tso-chi	Wing Fan	drama	Won the Tokyo Sakura Grand Prix at the Tokyo International Film Festival
Spring Cactus	Huang Yu-shan		Drama	
