= 32nd Golden Horse Awards =

Award ceremony for Chinese-language films of 1994 and 1995

- Date: December 9, 1995
- Site: Sun Yat-sen Memorial Hall, Taipei, Taiwan
- Hosted by: Chang Hsiao-yen and Sylvia Chang
- Organized by: Taipei Golden Horse Film Festival Executive Committee

Highlights
- Best Feature Film: Summer Snow
- Best Director: Hou Hsiao-hsien; Good Men, Good Women
- Best Actor: Lin Yang; Super Citizen Ko
- Best Actress: Josephine Siao; Summer Snow
- Most awards: Summer Snow (4)
- Most nominations: Summer Snow (9)

Television in Taiwan
- Channel: CTV; Star Chinese Movies

The 32nd Golden Horse Awards (Mandarin:第32屆金馬獎) took place on December 9, 1995, at the Sun Yat-sen Memorial Hall in Taipei, Taiwan.

== Winners and nominees ==
Winners are listed first and highlighted in boldface.

**Best Feature Film**: **Summer Snow**; Good Men, Good Women; Siao Yu; Daughter-in-Law; Super Citizen Ko; Tropical Fish	**Best Documentary** **no winner**: Dudu Wu, the Story of Lanyu Scops Owl
**Best Animation**: **Post Human**
**Best Director**: **Hou Hsiao-hsien — Good Men, Good Women**; Ann Hui — Summer Snow; Wan Jen — Super Citizen Ko; Chen Yu-hsun — Tropical Fish	**Best Leading Actor**: **Lin Yang — Super Citizen Ko**; Roy Chiao — Summer Snow; Tony Leung Ka-fai — Evening Liaison; Lee Li-chun — Daughter-in-Law
**Best Leading Actress**: **Josephine Siao — Summer Snow**; Gua Ah-leh — Maiden Rose; Rene Liu — Siao Yu; Annie Yi — Good Men, Good Women	**Best Supporting Actor**: **Law Kar-ying — Summer Snow**; Kuo Tzu-chien — Daughter-in-Law; Lin Cheng-sheng — Tropical Fish; Jacky Cheung — High Risk
**Best Supporting Actress**: **Wern Ying — Tropical Fish**; Law Koon-lan — Summer Snow; Jaclyn Chu — Formosa Sisters; Su Ming-ming — Super Citizen Ko
**Audience Choice Award**: **Summer Snow**	**Mainland Chinese Filmmaker Award**: **Jet Li**
**Lifetime Achievement Award**: **Li Hsing**
