= List of Taiwanese films =

This is a list of films produced in Taiwan ordered by year of release. For an alphabetical list of Taiwanese films see Category:Taiwanese films

== List of films by decade ==
- List of Taiwanese films before 1970
- List of Taiwanese films of the 1970s
- List of Taiwanese films of the 1980s
- List of Taiwanese films of the 1990s
- List of Taiwanese films of the 2000s
- List of Taiwanese films of the 2010s
- List of Taiwanese films of the 2020s

== See also ==
- List of Taiwanese submissions for the Academy Award for Best Foreign Language Film
- Cinema of Taiwan
