= Betelnut Beauty (film) =

2001 film by Lin Cheng-sheng

- Film poster
- Directed by: Lin Cheng-sheng
- Written by: Lin Cheng-sheng
- Produced by: Peggy Chiao; Hsu Hsiao-ming
- Starring: Chang Chen; Angelica Lee; Leon Dai
- Cinematography: Han Yun-chung
- Edited by: Liao Ching-sung
- Music by: A-Ji
- Distributed by: Arc Light Films; Pyramide Distribution (France)
- Release date: 19 May 2001
- Running time: 105 minutes
- Country: Taiwan
- Language: Mandarin

Betelnut Beauty (Chinese: 愛你愛我; pinyin: Ài Nǐ Ài Wǒ; lit. 'Love You Love Me') is a 2001 Taiwanese film directed by Lin Cheng-sheng. It depicts the love story between a betel nut beauty and a young man, who failed to survive in Taipei City. The film is nominated for the Golden Bear at the 51st Berlin International Film Festival. Director Lin Cheng-sheng won the Silver Bear for Best Director and the leading actress Angelica Lee won the Piper Heidsieck New Talent Award for the best young actress. In 2001, President Chen Shui-bian met the crew of Betelnut Beauty to praise their success at the 51st Berlin International Film Festival.

== Plot ==
Fei-fei, who tried to run away from a broken family, met Feng for the first time on the street of Taipei. She was caught by her mother and was screaming her lungs out to release the pressure. Feng, just discharged from the military, came to Taipei to make a living. He saw Fei-fei screaming in the rain and joined her to scream too. She found him weird and left with her mother but he had already fallen in love with her.

After she returned home, Fei-fei found out that her mother had secretly read her diary, which she had started writing since her father left home. She was angry that she ran away from her family again and went to find her friend Yi-li. Yi-li recommended her to work at the betel nut stall of her ex-boyfriend Guang with her. She subsequently became a betel nut beauty, wearing sexy clothing to attract drivers passing by to stop and make purchases. The location of the betel nut stall happened to be near the building where Feng rented a small hut on the rooftop. They met again and Fei-fei saw his drawing of her in his wallet. They began to see each other and later live together.

Despite his old friend's invitation and willingness to help, Feng refused to go back to his old job as a baker, which was too demanding and too greasy for him. Instead he hung out with Guang. In the meantime, Fei-fei got a chance to act, a small role in a movie, which led to her being discovered by a scout and had the prospect of becoming a singer. Encouraged by Guang, Feng agreed to steal the money in an ATM by using Guang's car to pull it down but failed. Feng decided to work at the bakery with his friend for Fei-fei's sake. Guang asked Feng to be the driver to help him ambush Tiger because he could no longer tolerate his harassment of Yi-li and rude attitude towards him. They did not find Tiger at his gambling house and, seeing lots of money on the table, they turned the ambush into robbery.

Feng came back home very late that night, which made Fei-fei very unhappy. They quarreled. Fei-fei told him that she did not want to be a woman like her mom, who kept waiting for her man to come back and left him. The next day they were trying to reach each other. But Feng and Guang were kidnapped by Tiger, who believed they were the robbers. Infuriated by Guang's denial and provocations regarding Yi-li, Tiger pointed his gun at him but dared not pull the trigger because of his uncle-in-law Ming, who was his boss. When Feng's cell phone rang with Fei-fei's call, Tiger turned to Feng and shot him to death.

== Cast ==
- Chang Chen as Feng, Fei-fei's boyfriend, who used to be a baker and later became a gangster who worked with Guang.
- Angelica Lee as Fei-fei, a betel nut beauty and Feng's girlfriend.
- Leon Dai as Tiger, Yi-li's boyfriend and a gangster.
- Kao Ming-chun as Guang, Yi-li's ex-boyfriend and a gangster.
- Tsai Chen-nan as Ming, the gangster boss of Tiger and Guang.
- Kuo Chin-chun (郭靜純) as Yi-li, Fei-fei's friend, who is Tiger and Guang's beloved one

== Production ==
Before he started his film career, Director Lin Cheng-sheng had been a baker for ten years. Other than being a feature film and documentary director, he also writes film scripts and acts. Although he had never thought about being an actor, the director of Tropical Fish, Chen Yu-hsun encouraged him to give it a try and he made his acting debut in Tropical Fish (熱帶魚; 1995) as a supporting actor and later took the leading role Buddha Bless America (太平天國; 1996) and Yours and Mine (我的神經病; 1997).

Betelnut beauty was a part of Taiwanese culture in the 1990s. Betel nuts had been a stimulating snack popular among the lower-class laborers in Taiwan since early times. After industrialization and urbanization in the 1970s, drivers of transportation industries became the main consumers of betel nuts, which were sold in stalls on roadside near traffic intersections. The history of selling betel nuts by beautiful girls could be traced to the Xie family in Shuangdong (雙冬), one of the main area where betel nuts were produced, when the three young daughters of the family joined their mother in the stall to sell the betel nuts and made the news 40 years ago. When the business became competitive in the early 1990s, the betel nut sellers, started to decorate the stalls with neon lighting and hired beautiful young girls wearing sexy revealing clothing to attract customers.

== Awards ==
The film premiered in competition at the 51st Berlin International Film Festival, where it was also nominated for the Golden Bear award. Lin won the Silver Bear for Best Director, and Angelica Lee won the Piper Heidsieck New Talent Award for the best young actress.
