= 51st Berlin International Film Festival =

2001 film festival in Berlin, Germany

- Festival poster
- Opening film: Enemy at the Gates
- Closing film: 2001: A Space Odyssey
- Location: Berlin, Germany
- Founded: 1951
- Awards: Golden Bear: Intimacy
- No. of films: 304 films
- Festival date: 7–18 February 2001
- Website: http://www.berlinale.de

Berlin International Film Festival chronology
- 52nd 50th

The 51st annual Berlin International Film Festival was held from February 7 to 18, 2001. The festival opened with war-drama film Enemy at the Gates by Jean-Jacques Annaud. A 70 mm restored version of Stanley Kubrick's 1968 science fiction film 2001: A Space Odyssey was the closing film of the festival.

The Golden Bear was awarded to Intimacy, directed by Patrice Chéreau.

The retrospective section was dedicated to German-Austrian filmmaker Fritz Lang.

== Juries ==
The following people were announced as being on the jury for the festival:

=== Main Competitions ===
- Bill Mechanic, American producer - Jury President
- Jacqueline Bisset, British actress
- Diego Galán, Spanish director and film critic
- Kyoko Hirano, Japanese writer
- Fatih Akın, German filmmaker, producer and actor
- Dario Argento, Italian filmmaker and producer
- Xie Fei, Chinese filmmaker
- Héctor Babenco, Brazilian-Argentine filmmaker and producer
- Dominique Blanc, French actress

== Official Sections ==
=== Main Competition ===
The following films were in competition for the Golden Bear and Silver Bear awards:

English title	Original title	Director(s)	Country
Bamboozled		Spike Lee	United States
Beijing Bicycle	十七岁的单车	Wang Xiaoshuai	China, Taiwan
Betelnut Beauty	愛你愛我	Lin Cheng-sheng	Taiwan, France
Chocolat		Lasse Hallström	United States, United Kingdom
La Ciénaga		Lucrecia Martel	Argentina, France, Spain
The Claim		Michael Winterbottom	United Kingdom, France, Canada
Fat Girl	À ma soeur!	Catherine Breillat	Italy, France
Félix et Lola		Patrice Leconte	France
Finding Forrester	Finding Forrester	Gus Van Sant	United States
The Ignorant Fairies	Le fate Ignoranti	Ferzan Özpetek	France, Italy
Intimacy		Patrice Chéreau	United Kingdom, France, Germany, Italy
Inugami	犬神家の一族	Masato Harada	Japan
Italian for Beginners	Italiensk for begyndere	Lone Scherfig	Denmark, Sweden
Joint Security Area	공동경비구역 JSA	Park Chan-wook	South Korea
Chloe	クロエ	Gō Rijū	Japan
Little Senegal		Rachid Bouchareb	Algeria, France, Germany
Malèna		Giuseppe Tornatore	Italy
My Sweet Home		Filippos Tsitos	Greece, Germany
The Tailor of Panama		John Boorman	United States, Ireland
Traffic		Steven Soderbergh	United States
Weiser		Wojciech Marczewski	Poland, Switzerland, Germany
Wit		Mike Nichols	United Kingdom, United States
You're the One	Una historia de entonces	José Luis Garci	Spain

=== Retrospective ===
2001 Retrospective poster, dedicated to Fritz Lang

The following films were shown in the retrospective:

English title	Original title	Director(s)	Country
American Guerrilla in the Philippines	American Guerrilla in the Philippines	Fritz Lang	United States
Artificial Paradise	Umetni Raj	Karpo Godina	Yugoslavia
Beyond a Reasonable Doubt		Fritz Lang	United States
The Big Heat	The Big Heat	Fritz Lang	United States
The Blue Gardenia	The Blue Gardenia	Fritz Lang	United States
La Chienne		Jean Renoir	France
Clash by Night		Fritz Lang	United States
Cloak and Dagger		Fritz Lang	United States
Contempt	Le Mépris	Jean-Luc Godard	France, Italy
Destiny	Der müde Tod	Fritz Lang	Germany
Die Nibelungen		Fritz Lang	Germany
Die Nibelungen: Siegfried		Fritz Lang	Germany
Dr. M	Docteur M	Claude Chabrol	France, West Germany
Dr. Mabuse the Gambler – Part I — The Great Gambler: An Image of the Age	Dr. Mabuse, der Spieler Part I – Der große Spieler: Ein Bild der Zeit	Fritz Lang	Germany
Dr. Mabuse the Gambler Part II – Inferno: A Game for the People of our Age	Dr. Mabuse, der Spieler Part II – Inferno: Ein Spiel von Menschen unserer Zeit	Fritz Lang	Germany
Encounter with Fritz Lang	Begegnung mit Fritz Lang	Peter Fleischmann	West Germany
Fritz Lang Interviewed by William Friedkin		William Friedkin	United States
Four Around a Woman	Kämpfende Herzen (Die Vier um die Frau)	Fritz Lang	Germany
For Example Fritz Lang	Zum Beispiel Fritz Lang	Erwin Leiser	West Germany
Fury		Fritz Lang	United States
Hangmen Also Die!		Fritz Lang	United States
The Human Beast	La Bête Humaine	Jean Renoir	France
Hilde Warren and Death	Hilde Warren und der Tod	Joe May	Germany
House by the River		Fritz Lang	United States
Human Desire		Fritz Lang	United States
The Indian Tomb	Das Indische Grabmal	Fritz Lang	West Germany, France
Liliom		Fritz Lang	France
M		Fritz Lang	Germany
M		Joseph Losey	United States
Madame Butterfly	Harakiri	Fritz Lang	Germany
Man Hunt		Fritz Lang	United States
Metropolis		Fritz Lang	Germany
Ministry of Fear		Fritz Lang	United States
Moonfleet		Fritz Lang	United States
People to Each Other	Menschen untereinander	Gerhard Lamprecht	Germany
The Plague of Florence	Die Pest in Florenz	Otto Rippert	Germany
Rancho Notorious		Fritz Lang	United States
The Return of Frank James		Fritz Lang	United States
Scarlet Street		Fritz Lang	United States
Secret Beyond the Door		Fritz Lang	United States
Spies	Spione	Fritz Lang	Germany
The Testament of Dr. Mabuse	Das Testament des Dr. Mabuse	Fritz Lang	Germany
The Tiger of Eschnapur	Der Tiger von Eschnapur	Fritz Lang	France, Germany
The Thousand Eyes of Dr. Mabuse	Die 1000 Augen des Dr. Mabuse	Fritz Lang	West Germany, France
The Wandering Image	Das wandernde Bild	Fritz Lang	Germany
Western Union		Fritz Lang	United States
While The City Sleeps		Fritz Lang	United States
Woman in the Moon	Frau Im Mond	Fritz Lang	Germany
The Woman in the Window		Fritz Lang	United States
You And Me		Fritz Lang	United States
You Only Live Once		Fritz Lang	United States

=== Panorama ===
The following films were shown:

== Official Awards ==
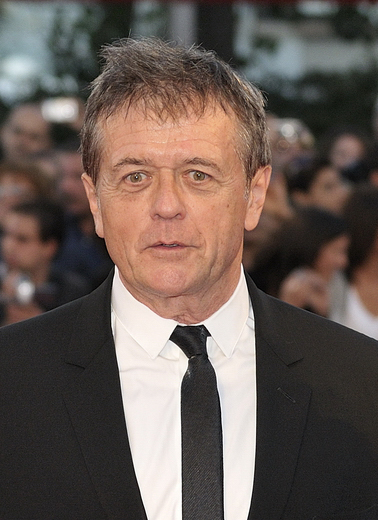
Patrice Chéreau, winner of the Golden Bear at the festival

=== Main Competition ===
The following prizes were awarded by the Jury:

- Golden Bear: Intimacy by Patrice Chéreau
- Silver Bear Special Jury Prize: Beijing Bicycle by Wang Xiaoshuai
- Silver Bear for Best Director: Lin Cheng-sheng for Betelnut Beauty
- Silver Bear for Best Actress: Kerry Fox for Intimacy
- Silver Bear for Best Actor: Benicio del Toro for Traffic
- Silver Bear for an Outstanding Artistic Contribution: Raúl Pérez Cubero for You're the One
- Silver Bear Jury Prize: Lone Scherfig for Italian for Beginners
- Alfred Bauer Prize: La Ciénaga by Lucrecia Martel

=== Honorary Golden Bear ===
- Kirk Douglas

=== Berlinale Camera ===
- Kei Kumai

== Independent Awards ==
=== Blue Angel Award ===
- Intimacy by Patrice Chéreau

=== FIPRESCI Award ===
- Italian for Beginners by Lone Scherfig
