= Connection by Fate =

- Film poster
- Chinese: 超級公民
- Directed by: Wan Jen
- Written by: Cheng Wen-tang; Chen Fang-ming; Wan Jen
- Produced by: Fan Chien-you (范健祐)
- Starring: Tsai Chen-nan; Chang Chen-yue
- Cinematography: Shen Jui-yuan (沈瑞源)
- Edited by: Hsiao Ju-kuan (蕭汝冠); Lin Chih-ju (林志儒)
- Music by: Fan Tsung-pei; Pairang Pavavaljung
- Production companies: Wan Jen Films Co., Ltd.
- Distributed by: Wan Jen Films Co., Ltd.
- Release date: 1998
- Running time: 103 minutes
- Country: Taiwan
- Languages: Mandarin, Taiwanese, Paiwan

Connection by Fate (1998) is the third film of Wan Jen’s “super trilogy” (超級三部曲), the other two being Super Citizen (超級市民; 1985) and Super Citizen Ko (1994). The film depicts the last days of a taxi driver Ah-de, who used to be a political activist but had now lost his faith in politics. He is depicted as a ghost accompanied by the ghost of an aboriginal worker, before he actually turned into one after he committed suicide. Adopting the form of Ah-de’s subjective viewpoint, the film is a complex reflection on the meaning of politics, social movement, memory, and life itself.

== Plot ==
Ma Le (played by Chang Chen-yue), an aboriginal youth who left his hometown to work in Taipei, was a construction worker. The construction director’s exploitation of workers provoked him to kill the director on impulse and was sentenced to death. Ah-de (played by Tsai Chen-nan) was a middle-aged taxi driver who was an activist in the social movements in the 1980s. He became suicidal, ever since his young son’s accidental death. He became a taxi driver and, instead of recording the protests, he began to record his daily life with a camera placed on the dashboard of his car. He often reviewed the videos of the social movements he participated and recorded and got totally frustrated by the fact that they had become forgotten history for the new generation. He had lost his faith in political movements and the memories of the death of his son and his grandfather kept haunted him.

On the night he committed the crime, Ma Le happened to take Ah-de’s taxi and left a one thousand NT dollar bill stained with blood. After the night, Ma Le’s ghost often showed up in Ah-de’s life. Taking care of Ah-li, the 19 year-old daughter of a fellow activist, who had died, was the only purpose of his life. She was a college student, who took a part-time job at a bar. She would like Ah-de to go abroad with her but Ah-de told her it was impossible because they lived in two different generations. One day Ah-de committed suicide by jumping out of the building where he lived as his son accidentally did and became a ghost himself. He and Ma Le wandered in the ruins of Taipei city and an abandoned playground and on the seventh day he and Ma Le went back to Ma Le’s tribal homeland in the mountains to be led to the underworld for reincarnation.

== Production ==
Connection by Fate was adapted from Cheng Wen-tang’s script, The Poet and Ah-de (詩人與阿德), which was also the original title of the film. It was the third film in Wan Jen’s “super trilogy” after Super Citizen (1985), Super Citizen Ko (1994). The story of the aboriginal worker in the film is often linked to the ''Tang Ying-sheng incident” (湯英伸事件) that shocked the society in 1986, a tragedy about a Tsou youth who killed the whole family of his employer because he was mistreated and had to work long hours. Tang Ying-sheng was executed when he was only 19 years old.

The story in this film unfolds through many different languages, including Mandarin, Taiwanese, and Paiwan. The poetic Taiwanese lines uttered by Tsai Chen-nan deal with serious issues, such as death, were written by Chen Fang-Ming, who was dedicated to Taiwanese language education. The film also invited Paiwan artist Sakuliu Pavavaljung and writer Ahronglong Sakinu as supervisors, displaying Paiwan culture through language, clothing, music, etc.

Both Chang Chen-yue and Tsai Chen-nan are famous singers in Taiwan. Chang Chen-yue is Amis. Tsai Chen-nan speaks authentic Taiwanese, which makes the voiceover sound poetic. He said that he liked the soliloquy at the end of film the most, which to him was very inspiring.

The film attempts to discuss issues related to different cultures and beliefs of aboriginal people and Han people. A lot of video tapes which recorded the social movements around the time the martial law was lifted in 1987 were also put into the film, shedding light on Taiwan’s political history. It points out the limits and potential problems in the Han-centered indigenization and democratic movements. Director Wan Jen made a TV series about the aboriginals called Dana Sakura (風中緋櫻：霧社事件) in 2003, which also dealt with history of aboriginal people.

Artist Lin Yao-tang’s (林耀堂) artwork entitled The Poet and Ah-De is painted in 1998. It was a painting based on the story of Connection by Fate.

Wan Jen’s “super trilogy” consists of Super Citizen (1985), Super Citizen Ko (1994), and Connection by Fate, (1998). The word “super (超級)” appears in the Chinese title of these three of the films, and the director Wan Jen had said that it was used to convey a sarcastic attitude.

Regarding the music of Connection by Fate, there are two common incorrect pieces of information on the internet in Taiwan. One is that Fan Tsung-pei is the only name mentioned when referring to the best music award the film won at 1998 Asia-Pacific Film Festival. In fact Fan Tsung-pei and Pairang Pavavaljung, who is responsible for the aboriginal music, such as the nose flute in the film, is also listed next to Fan Tsung-pei.

The other mistake is that when Pairang Pavavaljung died in 2023, several news articles stated that he won the Best Music Award at 2000 Asia Pacific Film Festival. The correct information should be that Pailang won the award at 1998 Asia Pacific Film Festival together with Fan Tsung-pei for the music of Connection by Fate.

== Cast ==
Actor/Actress	Role	Ref.
Chang Chen-yue	Ma Le (馬勒)	
Tsai Chen-nan	Tsai Cheng-de/Ah-de (蔡政德)	
Chang Hui-chun (詹蕙純)	Ah-Li (阿麗)	
Chen Chiu-yen (陳秋燕)	Wife of Ah-de	
Li Mu-ming (李牧明)	Son of Ah-de	
Ou Chin-yu (歐金玉)	Grandmother of Ma Le	
Hung Yi-liang (洪議喨)	Father of Ma Le	
Lee Niao-tien (李鳥甜)	Mother of Ma Le	
Du Mu (杜牧)	Little sister of Ma Le	
Tu Yu-ju (杜玉如)	Female dancer	
Lien Bi-tung (連碧東)	Ah-cai (阿財)	

== Awards ==
Connection by Fate won Best Music at 1998 Asia-Pacific Film Festival.
