= Tracing to Expo '70 =

- Directed by: Hsiang-hsiong Liao
- Written by: Chen Hsush-huai; Kan Chuan
- Story by: Kan Chuan
- Produced by: Henry Kung
- Starring: Judy Ongg; Feng Hai
- Edited by: Shen Yeh-kang; Miyazawa Zenkou
- Music by: Li Lin
- Production company: Central Motion Picture Corporation
- Release date: 1970
- Country: Taiwan
- Language: Taiwanese Mandarin

Tracing to Expo '70 or Wan Bo Zhui Zong (Taiwanese Traditional Chinese: 萬博追蹤 Traditional Chinese: 萬博追踪), known as Bampaku Tsuiseki (Japanese: 万博追跡) in Japan, is a 1970 Taiwanese musical film starring Judy Ongg. Its story takes place at Expo '70. The film was theatrically released in Taiwan in 1970 and in Japan in 2026. It was shown at the 21st Osaka Asian Film Festival in 2025 and the 55th International Film Festival Rotterdam in 2026.

== Cast ==
- Judy Ongg
- Feng Hai

== Reception ==
The film was praised by Yasuko Onda.

== See also ==
- List of Taiwanese films of the 1970s
