= List of Taiwanese films of the 1970s =

This is a list of films produced in Taiwan ordered by year of release. For an alphabetical list of Taiwanese films see Category:Taiwanese films

== 1970 ==
Title	Director	Cast	Genre	Notes
The End of the Track	Mou Tun-fei	Donald Chua, David Meyer	drama	
Tracing to Expo '70		Judy Ongg		

== 1971 ==
Title	Director	Cast	Genre	Notes
A Touch of Zen	King Hu	Hsu Feng, Shih Jun	Wuxia	Won the Technical Prize at the 1975 Cannes Film Festival

== 1972 ==
Title	Director	Cast	Genre	Notes
Blood Of The Leopard	Kim Lung		Kung fu action	With Hong Kong

== 1974 ==
Title	Director	Cast	Genre	Notes
Gone With The Cloud	Liu Chia-chang	Tang Pao-Yun, Guan Shan Liu, Chia-chang, Brigitte Lin Ming, Lun Ku Ma Chi-Chun Chien Te-Men Li Jiushou	Romance	

== 1976 ==
Title	Director	Cast	Genre	Notes
Master of the Flying Guillotine	Jimmy Wang Yu	Jimmy Wang Yu	martial arts	

== 1977 ==
Title	Director	Cast	Genre	Notes
Eight Hundred Heroes	Ting Shan-hsi			
Cloud of Romance	CHEN Hung-lieh	Lin Qingxia, Qin Han, Qin Xianglin, Ma Yonglin	Romance	

== 1979 ==
Title	Director	Cast	Genre	Notes
Raining in the Mountain	King Hu	Hsu Feng, Shih Jun, Tien Feng	Wuxia	
The Story of a Small Town	Li Hsing	Kenny Bee	drama	
Good Morning, Taipei	Li Hsing	Kenny Bee	drama	
The Wild Goose On The Wing	Liu Li Li	Brigitte Lin (Actor), Chin Han (Actor), Xie Ling Ling, Ma Yong Lin	Romance	
