= Fan Tsung-pei =

Taiwanese cellist and composer (1961–2026)

Fan Tsung-pei (Chinese: 范宗沛; 6 January 1961 – 12 February 2026) was a Taiwanese cellist and composer.

== Life and career ==
Fan graduated from National Taiwan Academy of Arts and was the lead cellist of National Concert Hall Symphony Orchestra for nine years, until 1997.

In 1997, Fan and Lee Shou-chuan shared the Golden Horse Award for Best Original Film Score for the soundtrack to Super Citizen Ko. In that same year, Fan's Sound of Armour won the Golden Melody Award for Best Instrumental Album. The following year, Fan and Pairang Pavavaljung received the best music award at the Asia Pacific Film Festival for Connection by Fate. In 2000, Fan won his first Golden Bell Award for Formerly. He contributed to the 2002 independent film Voice of Waves, which was shortlisted for the Golden Horse Award for Best Live Action Short Film and for three prizes at the 38th Golden Bell Awards. Fan's work with Public Television Service included Once Upon a Time, Boat in a Stormy Sea and The General's Stone Tablet. For The General's Stone Tablet, Fan was nominated for the Golden Bell Award for Best Sound Effects. In 2003, Pai Hsien-yung's 1983 novel Crystal Boys was adapted for television, for which Fan won the Golden Melody Award for Best Instrumental Album.

As a solo artist, Fan's music has been published by the label Wind Music. He has performed at the Riverside Cafe and Live House, and covered the works of Teng Yu-hsien at Bopiliao Historic Block.

Fan died of a heart attack at Taipei Veterans General Hospital on 12 February 2026, at the age of 65.
