= Silver Bear for Best Director =

Award presented annually by the Berlin International Film Festival

- Silberner Bär/Beste Regie (German)
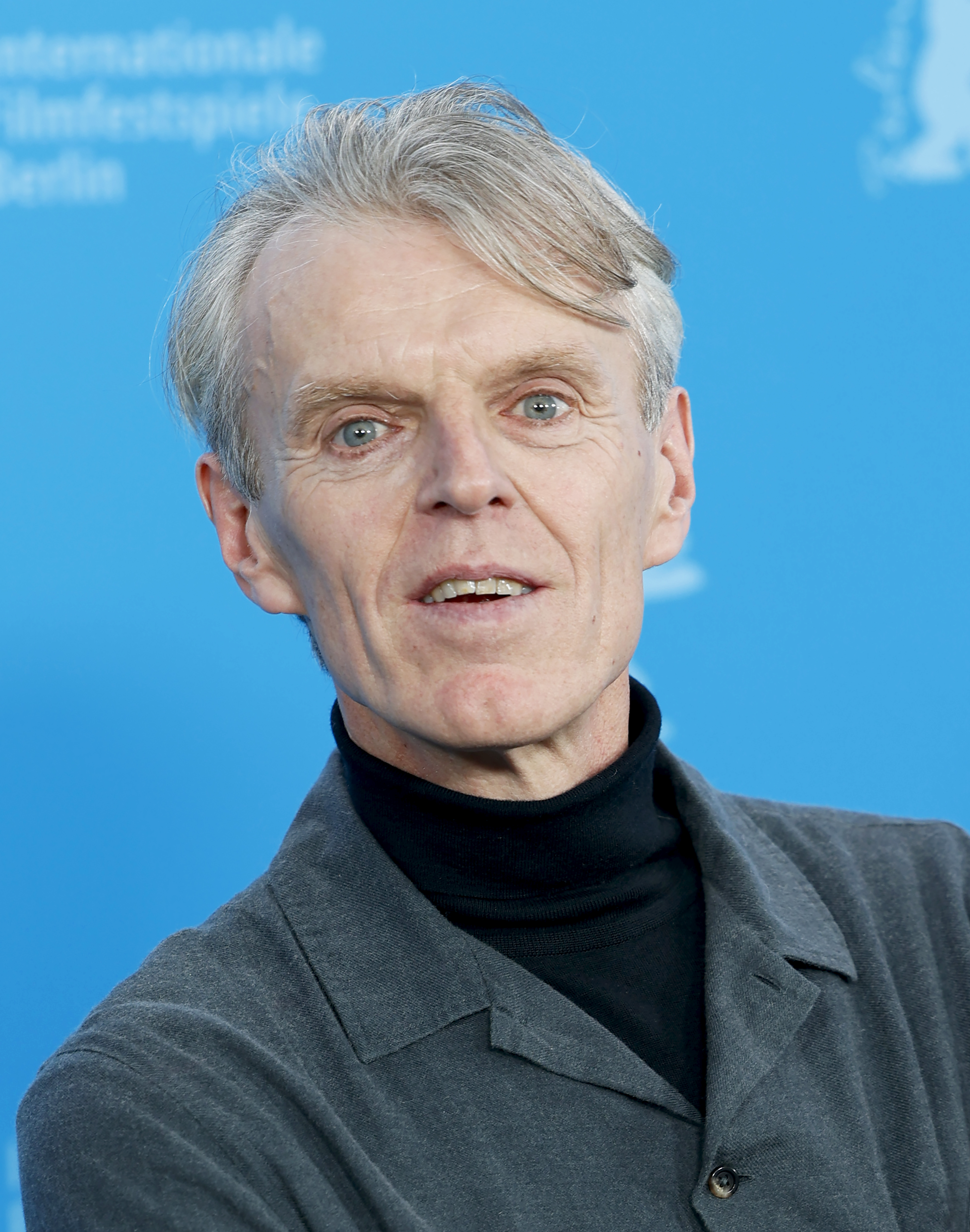
- 2026 recipient: Grant Gee
- Awarded for: Best Achievement in Direction
- Country: Germany
- Presented by: Berlin International Film Festival
- First award: 1956
- Currently held by: Grant Gee; Everybody Digs Bill Evans (2026)
- Website: www.berlinale.de

The Silver Bear for Best Director (German: Silberner Bär/Bester Regie) is an award presented annually at the Berlin International Film Festival since 1956. It is given for the best achievement in directing and is chosen by the International Jury from the films in the Competition slate at the festival.

Grant Gee is the most recent winner for his work on Everybody Digs Bill Evans (2026) at the 76th Berlin International Film Festival.

== History ==
The award was first presented in 1956. The prize was not awarded on five occasions (1969, 1971, 1973–74, and 1981). In 1970, no awards were given as the festival was called off mid-way due to the controversy over official selection film, o.k. by Michael Verhoeven, which led to the resignation of the international jury.

At the 6th Berlin International Film Festival held in 1956, Robert Aldrich was the first winner of this award for his work on Autumn Leaves,

Mario Monicelli has received the most awards in this category, with three. Satyajit Ray is the only director to win the award in consecutive years, for Mahanagar (1964) and Charulata (1965). One directing team has shared the award: Michael Winterbottom and Mat Whitecross for The Road to Guantánamo (2006). Astrid Henning-Jensen became the first woman to win the award, for Winterborn (1979).

== Winners ==
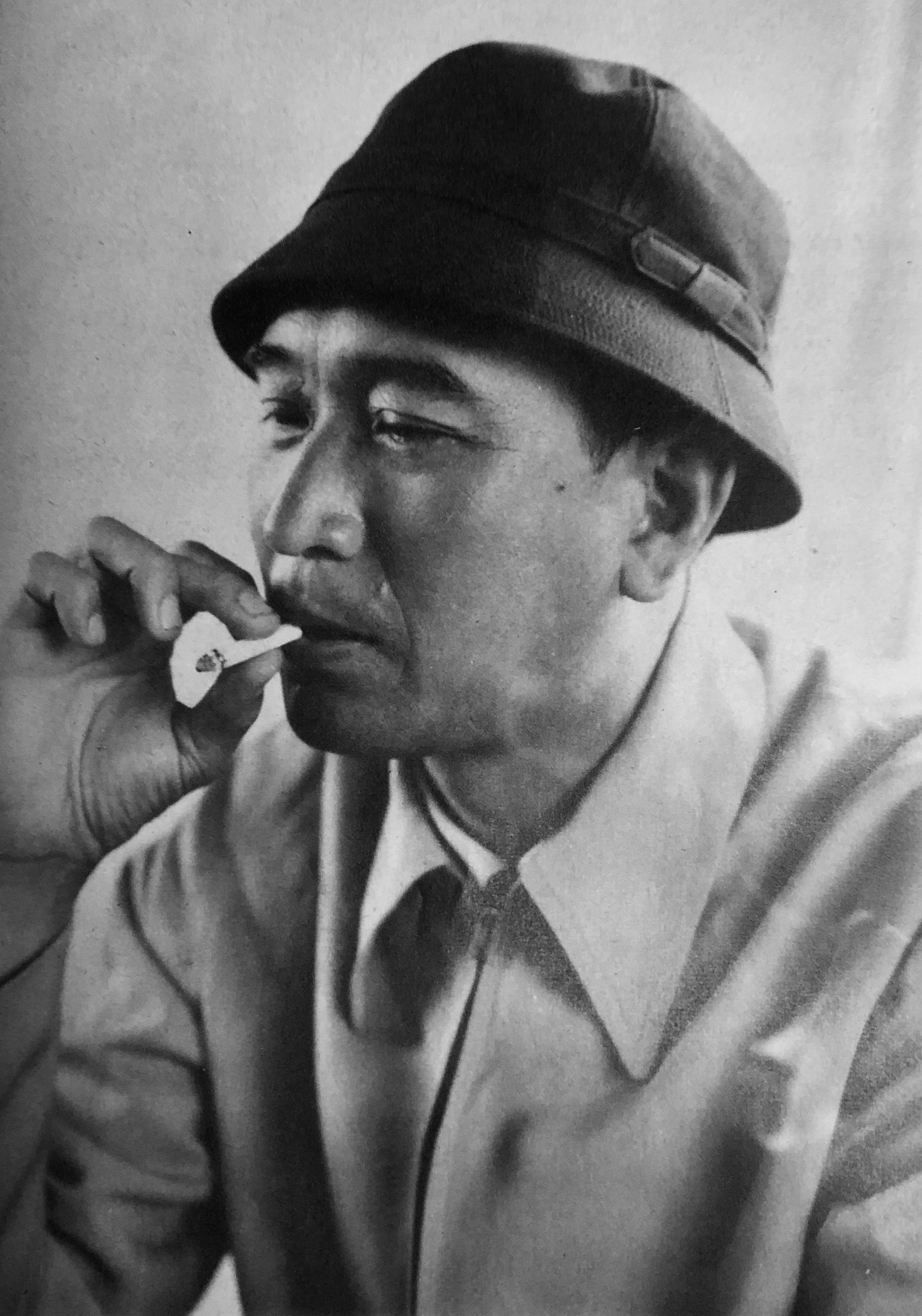
Akira Kurosawa won for The Hidden Fortress (1956)

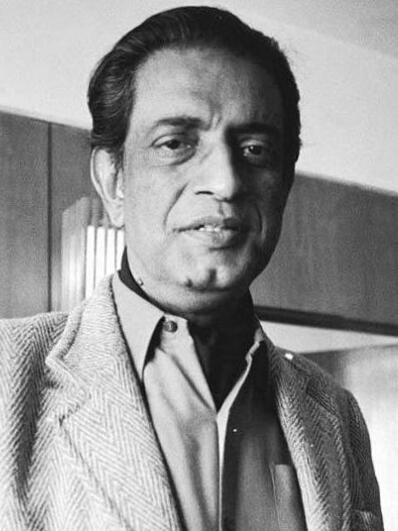
Satyajit Ray won twice for Mahanagar (1964) and Charulata (1965)

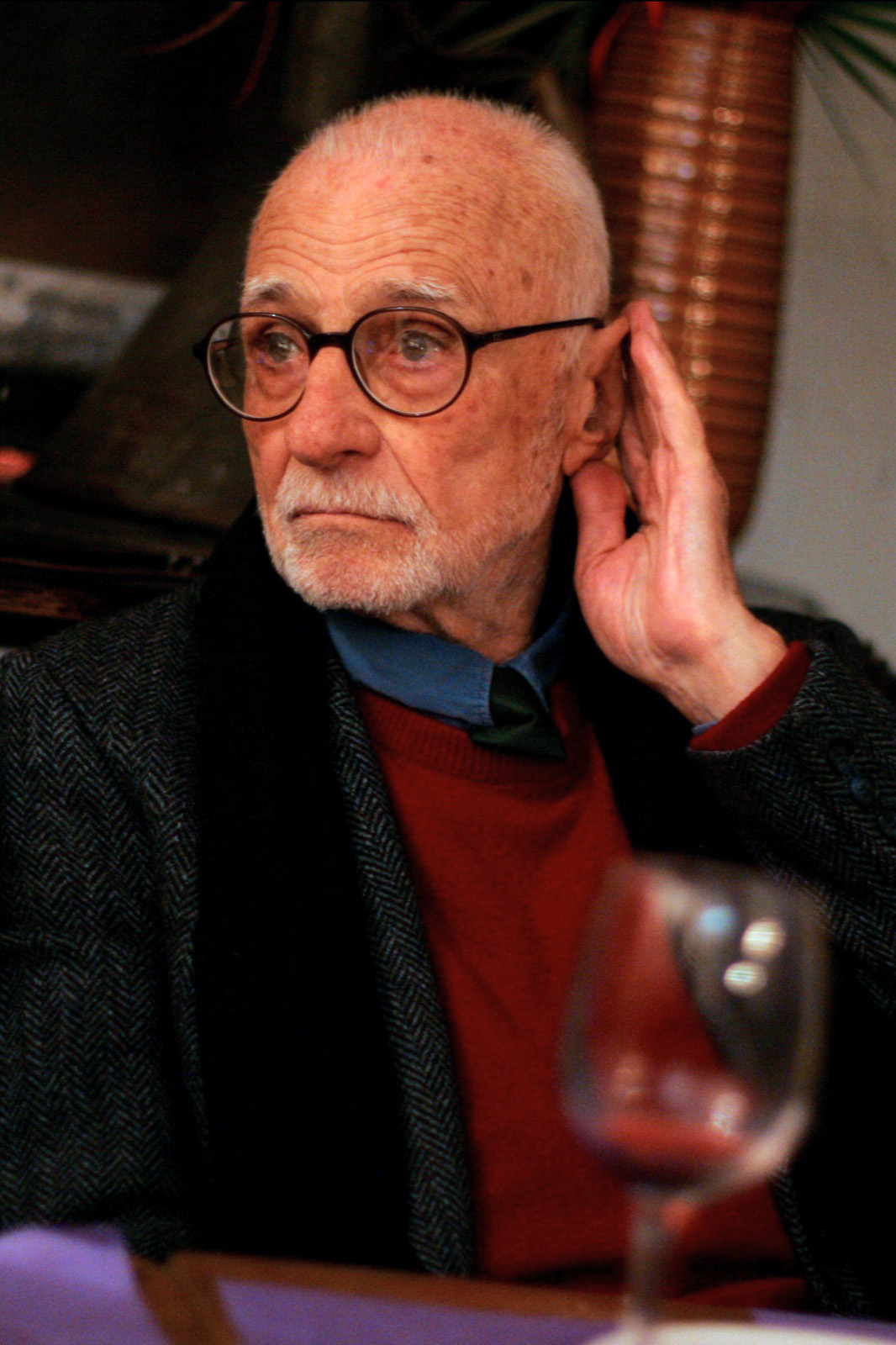
Mario Monicelli won thrice Fathers and Sons (1957), Caro Michele (1976), and Il Marchese del Grillo (1982)

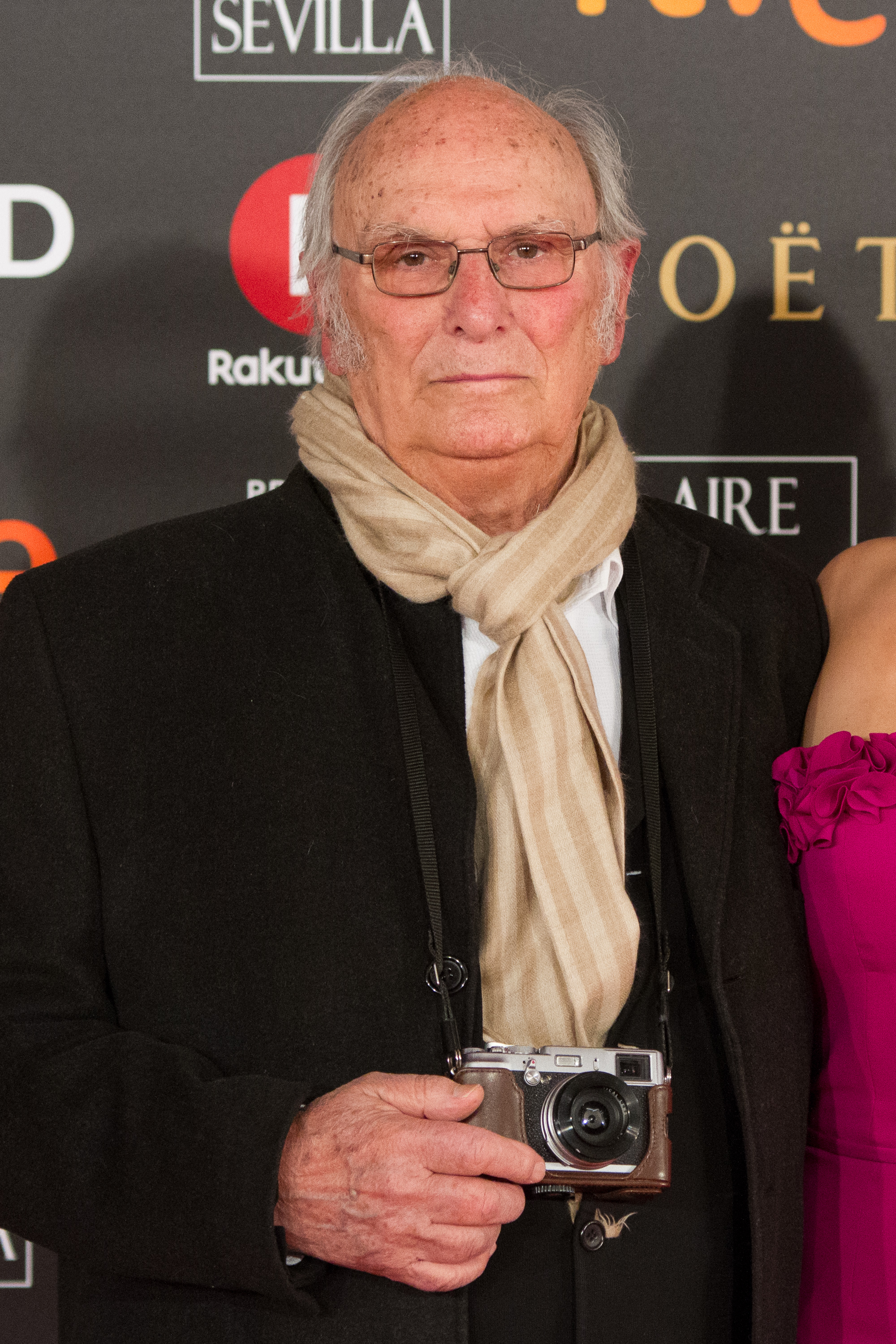
Carlos Saura won twice for The Hunt (1966) and Peppermint Frappé (1968)

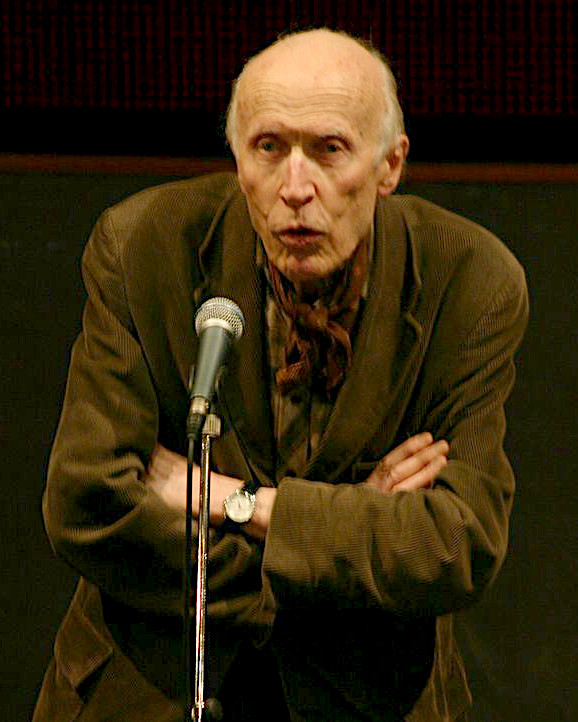
Eric Rohmer won for Pauline at the Beach (1983)

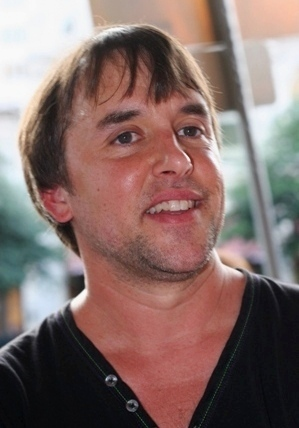
Richard Linklater won twice for Before Sunrise (1995) and Boyhood (2014)

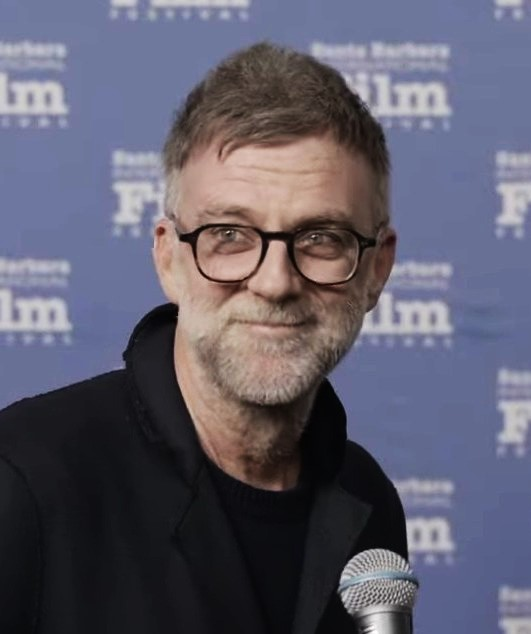
Paul Thomas Anderson won for There Will Be Blood (2007)

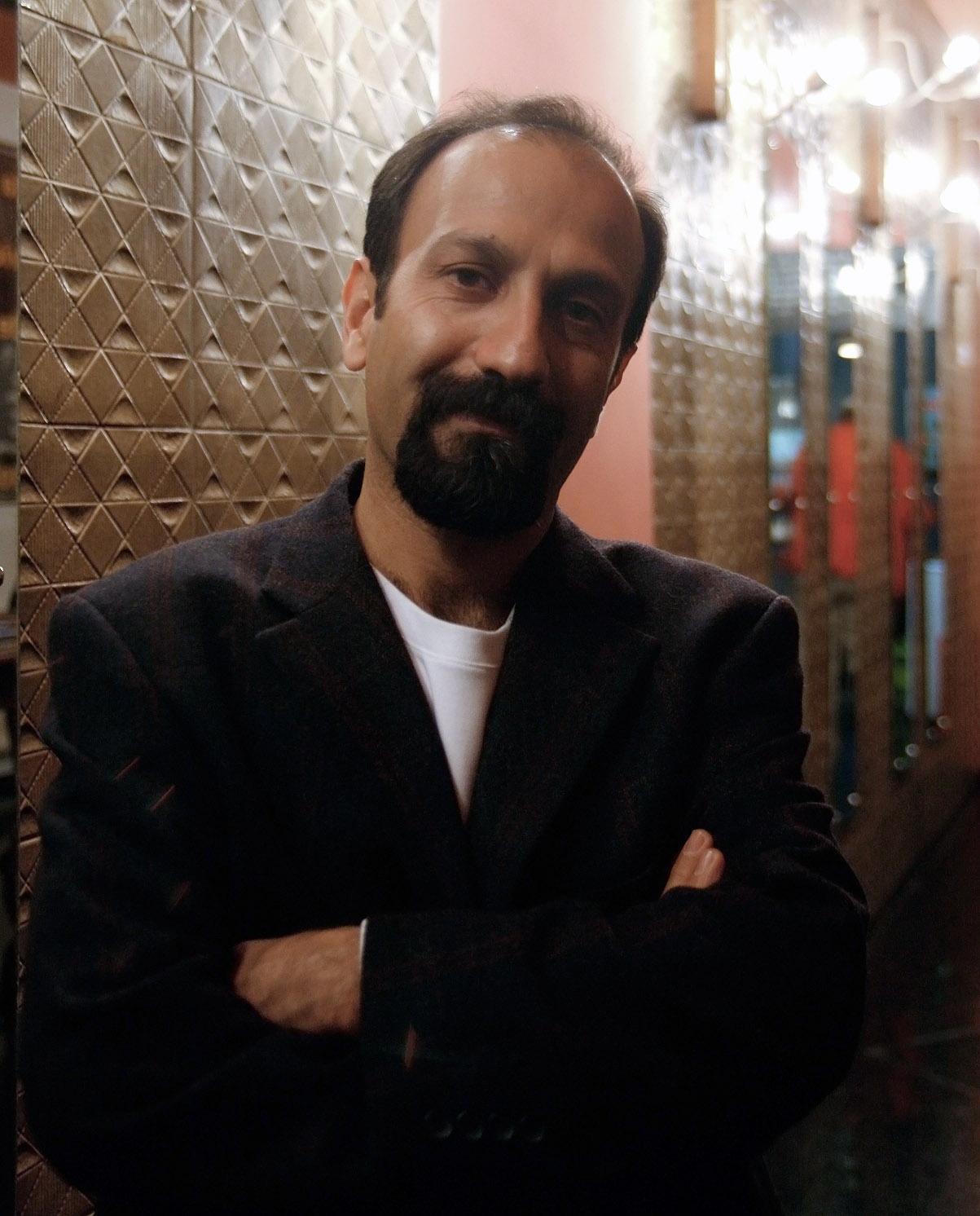
Asghar Farhadi won for About Elly (2009)

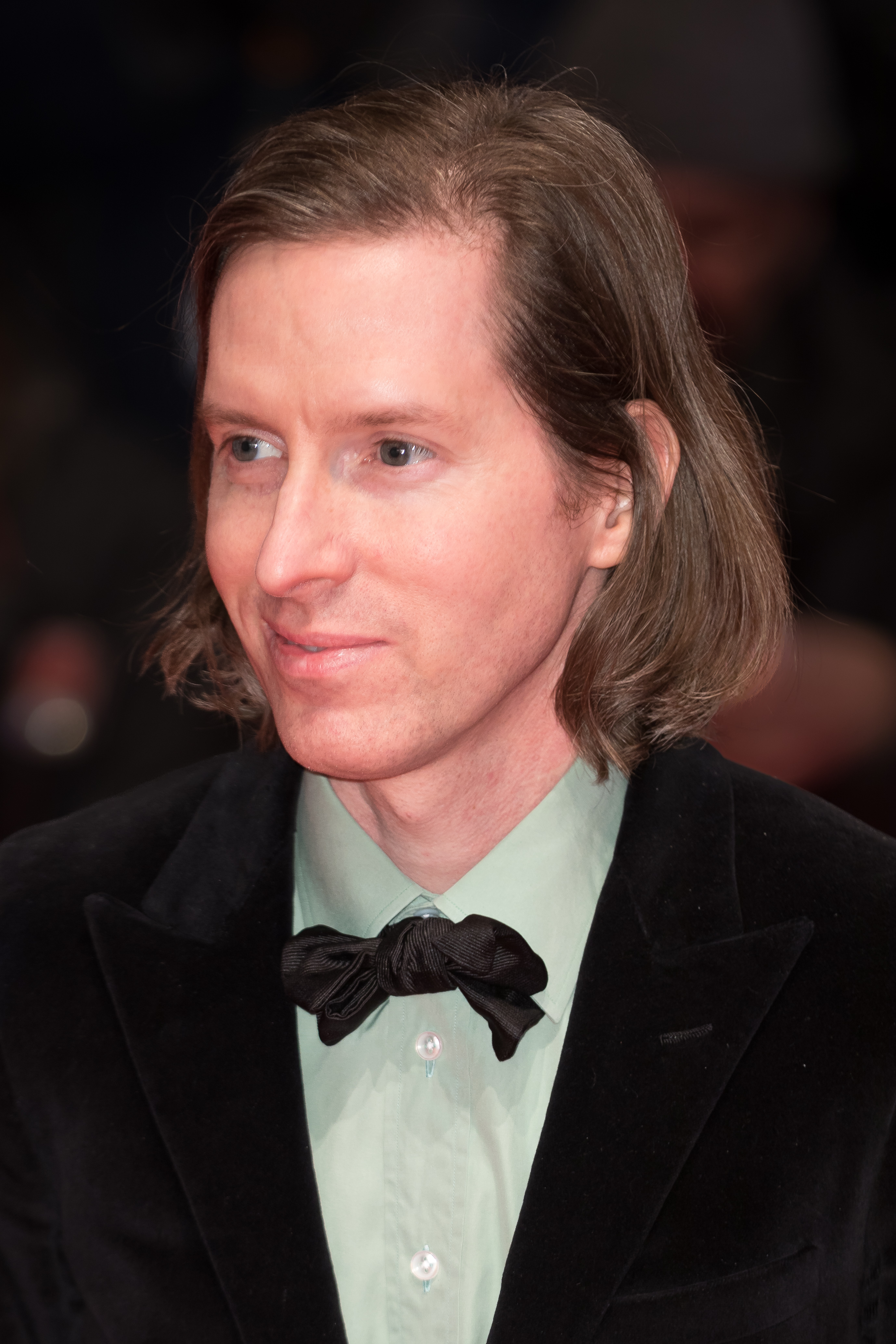
Wes Anderson won for Isle of Dogs (2018)

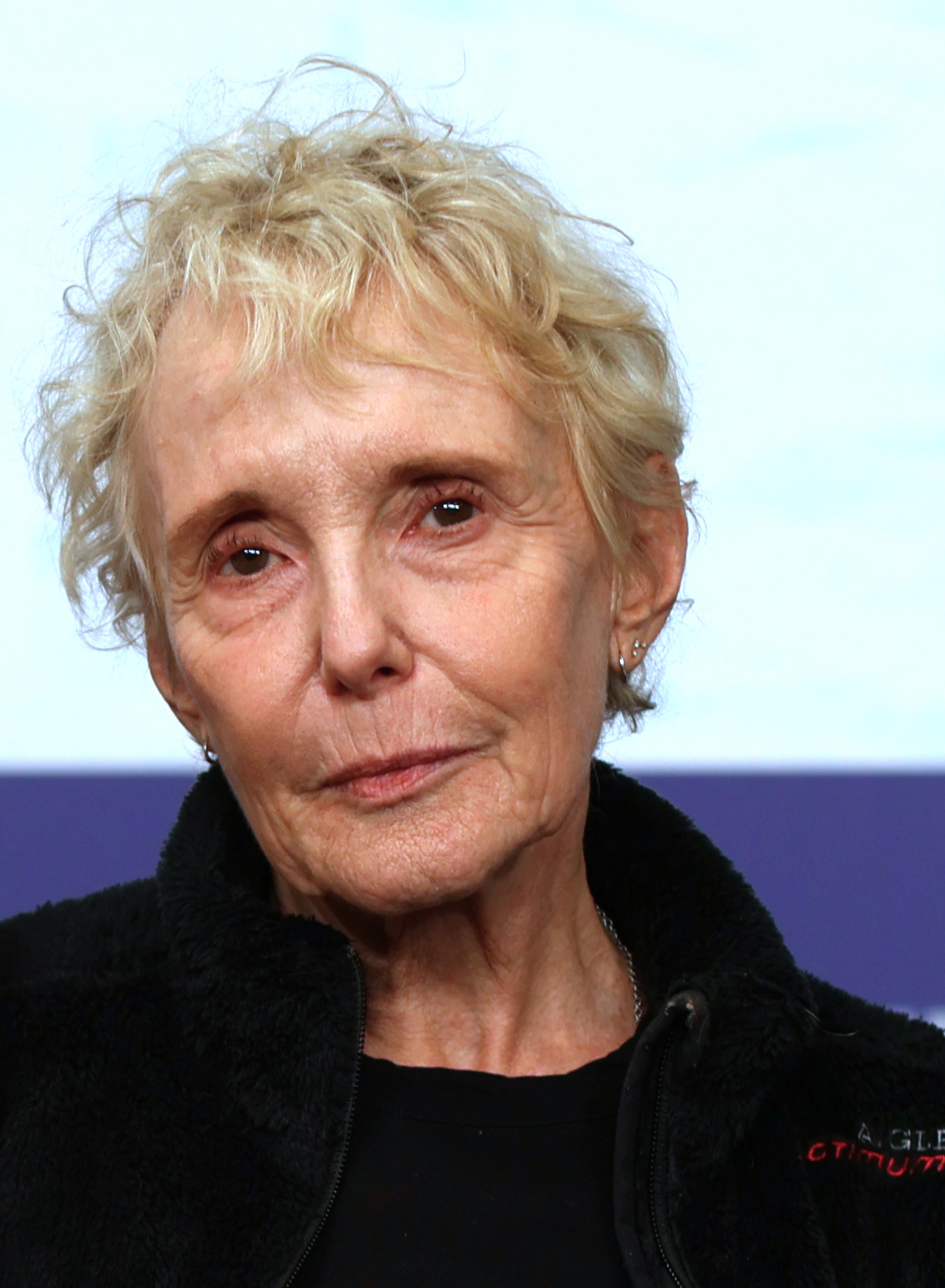
Claire Denis won for Both Sides of the Blade (2022)

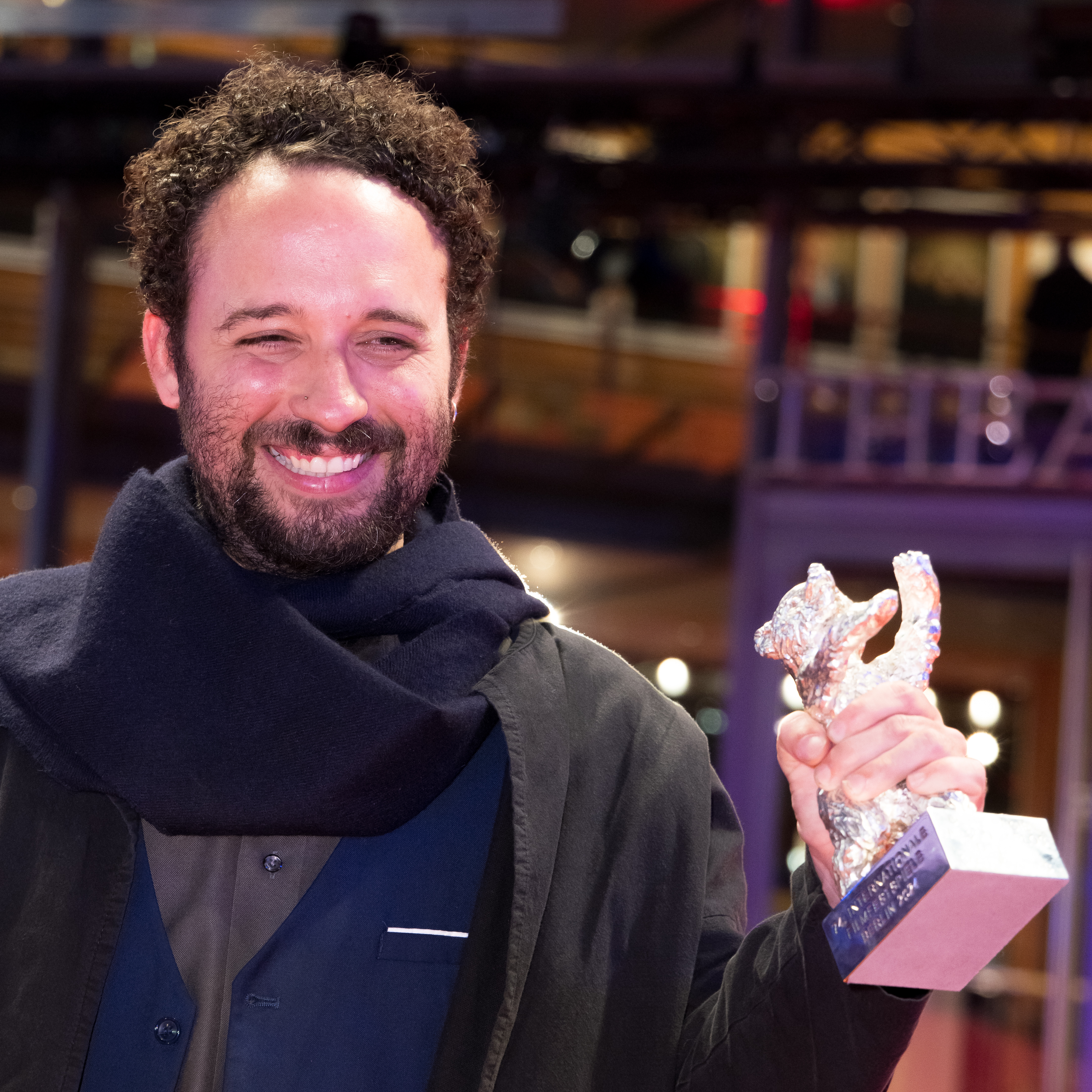
Nelson Carlo De Los Santos Arias won for Pepe (2024)

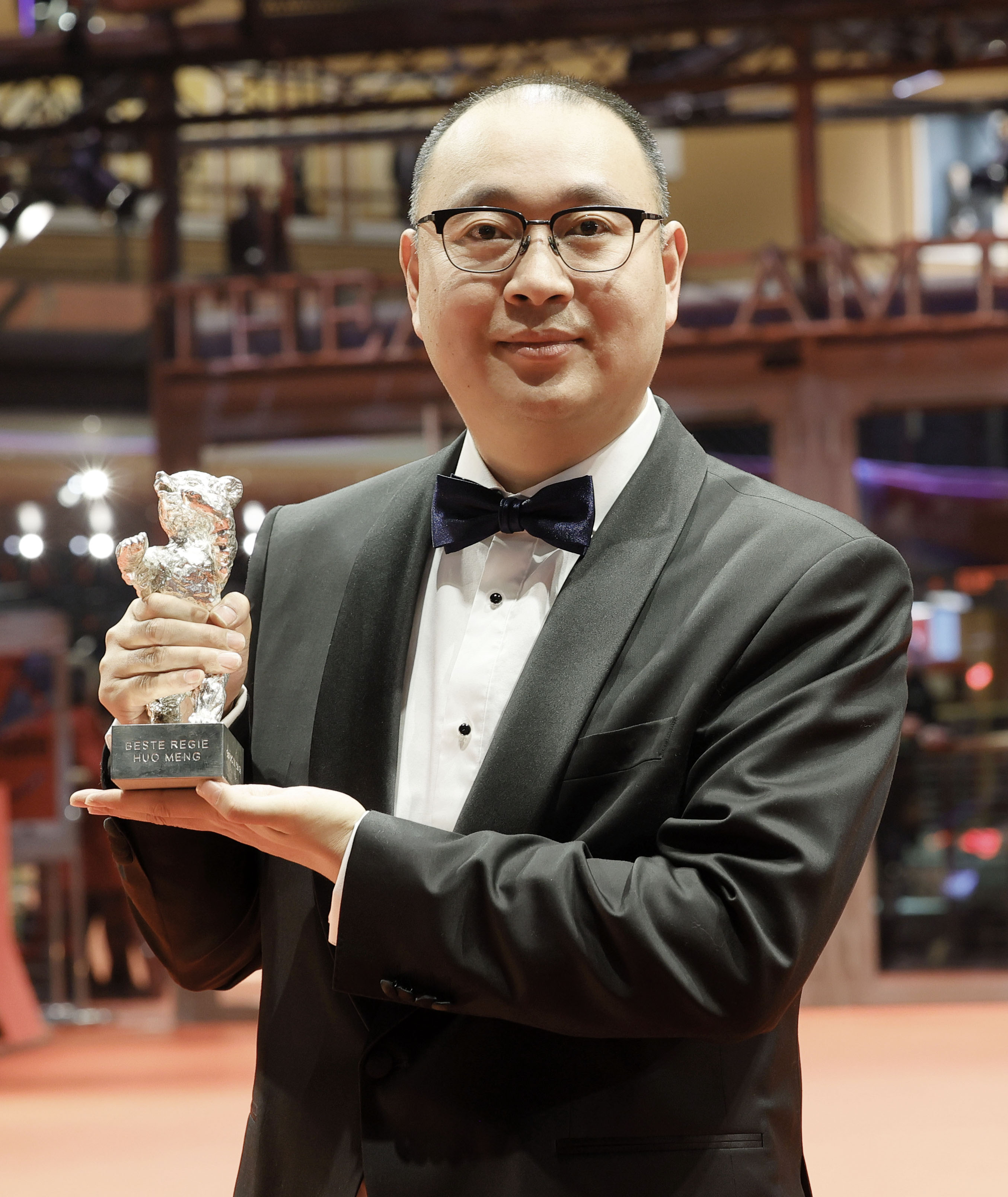
Huo Meng won for Living the Land (2025)

=== 1950s ===
Year	Director	English Title	Original Title
1956	Robert Aldrich	Autumn Leaves	
1957	Mario Monicelli	Fathers and Sons	Padri e figli
1958	Tadashi Imai	Jun'ai Monogatari	純愛物語
1959	Akira Kurosawa	The Hidden Fortress	隠し砦の三悪人

=== 1960s ===
Year	Director	English Title	Original Title
1960	Jean-Luc Godard	Breathless	À bout de souffle
1961	Bernhard Wicki	The Miracle of Father Malachia	Das Wunder des Malachias
1962	Francesco Rosi	Salvatore Giuliano	
1963	Nikos Koundouros	Young Aphrodites	Μικρές Αφροδίτες
1964	Satyajit Ray	Mahanagar	মহানগর
1965	Satyajit Ray	Charulata	চারুলতা
1966	Carlos Saura	The Hunt	La Caza
1967	Živojin Pavlović	The Rats Woke Up	Buđenje pacova
1968	Carlos Saura	Peppermint Frappé	

=== 1970s ===
Year	Director	English Title	Original Title
1972	Jean-Pierre Blanc	The Old Maid	La Vieille Fille
1975	Sergei Solovyov	One Hundred Days After Childhood	Сто дней после детства
1976	Mario Monicelli	Caro Michele	
1977	Manuel Gutiérrez Aragón	Black Litter	Camada negra
1978	Georgi Djulgerov	Advantage	Авантаж
1979	Astrid Henning-Jensen	Winterborn	Vinterbørn

=== 1980s ===
Year	Director	English Title	Original Title
1980	István Szabó	Bizalom	
1982	Mario Monicelli	Il Marchese del Grillo	
1983	Éric Rohmer	Pauline at the Beach	Pauline à la plage
1984	Costas Ferris	Rembetiko	Ρεμπέτικο
1984	Ettore Scola	Le Bal	Ballando ballando
1985	Robert Benton	Places in the Heart	
1986	Giorgi Shengelaya	The Journey of a Young Composer	ახალგაზრდა კომპოზიტორის მოგზაურობა
1987	Oliver Stone	Platoon	
1988	Norman Jewison	Moonstruck	
1989	Dušan Hanák	I Love, You Love	Ja milujem, ty miluješ

=== 1990s ===
Year	Director	English Title	Original Title
1990	Michael Verhoeven	The Nasty Girl	Das schreckliche Mädchen
1991	Jonathan Demme	The Silence of the Lambs	
1991	Ricky Tognazzi	Ultra	Ultrà
1992	Jan Troell	Il Capitano: A Swedish Requiem	Il Capitano
1993	Andrew Birkin	The Cement Garden	
1994	Krzysztof Kieślowski	Three Colours: White	Trois couleurs : Blanc
1995	Richard Linklater	Before Sunrise	
1996	Richard Loncraine	Richard III	
1996	Yim Ho	The Sun Has Ears	太陽有耳
1997	Eric Heumann	Port Djema	
1998	Neil Jordan	The Butcher Boy	
1999	Stephen Frears	The Hi-Lo Country	

=== 2000s ===
Year	Director	English Title	Original Title
2000	Miloš Forman	Man on the Moon	
2001	Lin Cheng-sheng	Betelnut Beauty	愛你愛我
2002	Otar Iosseliani	Monday Morning	Lundi matin
2003	Patrice Chéreau	Son frère	
2004	Kim Ki-duk	Samaritan Girl	사마리아
2005	Marc Rothemund	Sophie Scholl - The Final Days	Sophie Scholl - Die letzten Tage
2006	Michael Winterbottom and Mat Whitecross	The Road to Guantánamo	
2007	Joseph Cedar	Beaufort	בופור
2008	Paul Thomas Anderson	There Will Be Blood	
2009	Asghar Farhadi	About Elly	درباره الی

=== 2010s ===
Year	Director	English Title	Original Title
2010	Roman Polanski	The Ghost Writer	
2011	Ulrich Köhler	Sleeping Sickness	Schlafkrankheit
2012	Christian Petzold	Barbara	
2013	David Gordon Green	Prince Avalanche	
2014	Richard Linklater	Boyhood	
2015	Radu Jude	Aferim!	
2015	Malgorzata Szumowska	Body	Ciało
2016	Mia Hansen-Løve	Things to Come	L'Avenir
2017	Aki Kaurismäki	The Other Side of Hope	Toivon tuolla puolen
2018	Wes Anderson	Isle of Dogs	
2019	Angela Schanelec	I Was at Home, But	Ich war zuhause, aber

=== 2020s ===
Year	Director	English Title	Original Title	Ref.
2020	Hong Sang-soo	The Woman Who Ran	도망친 여자	
2021	Dénes Nagy	Natural Light	Természetes fény	
2022	Claire Denis	Both Sides of the Blade	Avec amour et acharnement	
2023	Philippe Garrel	The Plough	Le grand chariot	
2024	Nelson Carlo De Los Santos Arias	Pepe		
2025	Huo Meng	Living the Land	生息之地	
2026	Grant Gee	Everybody Digs Bill Evans		

== Multiple winners ==
The following individuals received two or more Best Director awards:

Number of Wins	Director(s)	Nationality	Films
3	Mario Monicelli	Italy	Fathers and Sons (1957), Caro Michele (1976), Il Marchese del Grillo (1982)
2	Satyajit Ray	India	Mahanagar (1964), Charulata (1965)
2	Carlos Saura	Spain	The Hunt (1966), Peppermint Frappé (1968)
2	Richard Linklater	United States	Before Sunrise (1995), Boyhood (2014)

== See also ==
- Cannes Film Festival Award for Best Director
- Silver Lion
