= Wang Shaudi =

Taiwanese director, writer and film producer

- 王小棣
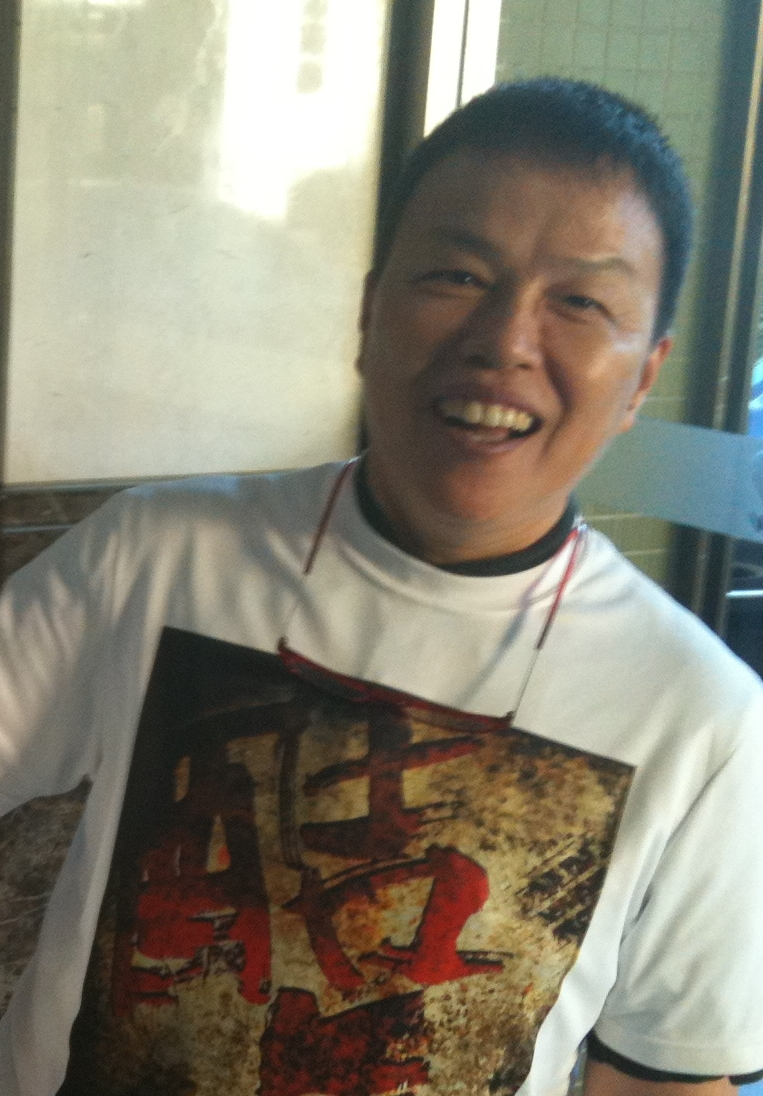
- Wang in 2010
- Born: 15 August 1953 (age 73); Taipei, Taiwan
- Education: Chinese Culture University (BFA); Trinity University; University of San Francisco (MFA)
- Occupations: Director; producer; screenwriter
- Parent: Wang Sheng (Father)

Wang Shaudi (Chinese: 王小棣; pinyin: Wáng Xiǎodì) is a Taiwanese film and television director, writer, and producer. She also taught film courses previously at the Taipei National University of the Arts (TNUA) and the Chinese Culture University (CCU). She works in both documentary filmmaking and fictional storytelling. Her works mostly focus on depicting local society and personal connections through dramatic storytelling. She has been involved in productions such as Life Plan A and B, 1000 Walls in Dream, and Tropical Fish. She has won multiple awards for her works including Yours and Mine for Best Screenplay at the Taipei Golden Horse Film Festival and Grandma and Her Ghosts for Best Film at the Taipei Film Festival. In 2014 she was presented with the Taiwan National Award for Arts for her contributions to filmmaking.

== Biography ==
Wang Shaudi was born in Taipei, Taiwan, in 1953. She completed her undergraduate degree in Theater Arts at the Chinese Culture University (CCU) before pursuing a master's degree in Theatre at the Trinity University in Texas, US. She later transferred to the University of San Francisco to major in film. Upon graduation, in 1979, she returned to Taiwan and started her own company, Min Xin Studio, where she worked as assistant director and screenwriter for The Battle of Erdan (1982), and later as screenwriter for Wang Toon's Strawman (1987) and Banana Paradise (1989). On February 10, 1992, she co-founded, with fellow director Huang Li-ming, Rice Film International, a company primarily produces television series and feature length television films for the Public Television Service of Taiwan. Winning numerous Golden Bell Awards, including Best Television Series, Best Television Film, Best Directing, and Best Writing, Wang Shaudi has become a household name for commoner television series of the 1980s and 1990s Taiwan and is most well-known for her television productions: Quanjiafu (全家福), Jiajiafu (家家福), Muji dai aiaoya (母雞帶小鴨), and Nasanmagu wodejia (納桑麻谷我的家). After working on a number of television productions, she wrote and directed her first feature-length film, Accidental Legend, which was released in 1996. Two years later, she directed the feature length animation, Grandma and Her Ghosts, which went on to win awards at the Taipei Film Festival, the Hong Kong International Film Festival, and the Vancouver International Film Festival.

== Social Participation ==
During an interview with the Public Television Service of Taiwan, Wang Shaudi drew an analogy between film directors and sociology students. For Wang Shaudi, cinema is a form of interaction between art and society. Due to the government incompetence in recent years, artists are compelled to engage in social activism and express public opinions. When the Ma Ying-jeou government was criticized by the public advocating for the Dapu Incident, Wang Shaudi expressed publicly that, "Why demolish Dapu? Everyone should watch closely. Who would attempt to take down a government for no reason? Only when its governance is way out of line. In a democratic society, good public servants are supposed to take care of its people rather than making them suffer. Taiwan has come a long way and no one could bear to see it go backward. We are all commoners, but everyone bears responsibility for the prosperity of society." "It is with heavy hand that we are all witnessing Taiwan taking backward steps. What is even more unbearable is that Taiwan has gone through a series of unstoppable prosecution that constantly challenges our bottom line, like what we have seen in the Shilin Wang Family Incident and the Dapu Incident. (「為什麼拆大埔？大家要看清楚。誰沒事拆政府？它做事太離譜。民主本該有好公僕，讓人民享福不是吃苦。台灣走了這麼長的路，誰能忍心看它退步？我們都是小人物，但是天下興亡就是看匹夫。」「大家都感受到台灣的退步，令人痛心。更重要是，台灣發生了一系列無法停止的迫害事件，已經令人無法安心工作，這觸及到身為一個人的底線了，例如士林王家、大埔的事情都是一樣。」)"

In the same context, Wang Shaudi also pointed out that the previous generations have experienced extreme trauma in social revolutions to fight for justice and freedom for Taiwan's posterities, which should not be defied by the current government's lack of transparency and rational reflexivity concerning its urban development and nuclear power policies. She criticized the government for their ignorance of the pain experienced by the factory workers. She has also been in solidarity with the Dapu Incident protesters' demand to take down the government. Wang Shaudi also shared that the government has failed to respond in details the public concerns over nuclear power, yet has continued to implement nuclear power plants. She expressed in anger, "This is unbelievable. Our government is horrible. I am on the verge of wanting to run for President myself! (「我的媽呀！我們國家好爛啊！…我被逼得快要想選總統了！」)" In the same interview, she also emphasized the importance of having a mature civil society and rejoiced seeing more and more young participants joining civil activism.

== Anecdote ==
- Both Wang Shaudi and the late director Liu Lili (May 6, 1938 – April 22, 2018) are known for their cross-dressing.
- Wang Shaudi was diagnosed with breast cancer in 2001.

== Selected filmography ==
- 1987 – Huangse gushi, co-directed with Sylvia Chang (Taiwanese actress, writer, singer, producer and director)
- 1988 – Give Me One More Chance, promotional video commissioned by the Taiwan's Ministry of Justice
- 1994 – Tropical Fish, first feature-length film produced by the Rice Film International. The film was awarded a Taiwan's Mistry of Culture subsidy of ten million New Taiwan Dollars
- 1995 – Accidental Legend, the first feature-length film directed by Wang Shaudi
- 1997 – Yours and Mine, a four-episode comedy genre film
- 1997 – Grandma and Her Ghosts, first feature-length animated film based on local Taiwanese storybook
- 2004 – Bear Hug, featuring themes on children's topics
- 2010 – Fantôme, Où es-tu
- 2011 – 10+10, an omnibus cinematic production commissioned by the Taipei Golden Horse Film Festival and Awards. Wang Shaudi directed the "Destined Eruption" segment.

Title	Title	Medium	Role	Reference
1982	The Battle of Erdan (血戰大二膽)		Co-writer	
1987	Strawman (稻草人)		Co-writer	
1988	Huangse gushi (黃色故事)	Feature film	Director; Screenwriter	
1989	Banana Paradise (香蕉天堂)		Screenwriter	
1996	Accidental Legend (飛天)		Director; Screenwriter	
1997	Yours and Mine (我的神經病)		Director; Screenwriter	
1998	Grandma and Her Ghosts (魔法阿媽)	Animated Feature	Director	
2003	Fu Yan (赴宴)	Television Series	Director; Screenwriter	
2004	Yingxiong (少年與英雄)	Feature film	Director; Screenwriter	
2004	Bear Hug (擁抱大白熊)		Screenwriter	
2007	Qingfeideyi zhi shengcunzhidao (情非得已之生存之道)		Producer	
2007	Wayward Kenting (我在墾丁*天氣晴)	Television Series	Screenwriter	
2009	Police et vous (波麗士大人)	Television Series	Director; Screenwriter	
2009	Seeing Off 1949 - Lunh Yingtai’s Journey (目送一九四九：龍應台的探索)	Documentary film	Producer	
2010	Fantôme, Où es-tu (酷馬)		Director; Screenwriter	
2011	10+10		Director	
2011	Count to 365 Days (倒數365天)		Director; Screenwriter	
2013	Boys Can Fly (刺蝟男孩)		Director; Screenwriter	
2013	Falling (含苞欲墜的每一天)	Television Mini Series	Director	
2014	Friends or Foes (剪刀石頭布)	Short	Director	
2015	Those Days When We Were Young	Short	Director; Screenwriter	
2015	The Elephant Apartments (大象)	Short	Director; Screenwriter	
2015	Baby Daddy (長不大的爸爸)	Television Series	Screenwriter; Producer	
2015	End of A Century: Miea’s story	Short	Producer	
2016	Life Plan A and B (荼蘼)	Television Mini Series	Screenwriter; Producer	
2016	Q series: Love of Sandstorm (戀愛沙塵暴)	Television Series	Producer	
2016	Jiang Teacher, You Talked About Love It (姜老師，你談過戀愛嗎?)	Television Mini Series	Screenwriter; Producer	
2016-17	Tienhei qing biyan (天黑請閉眼)	Television Mini Series	Producer	
2017	Meng|i de yiqing dao qiang (夢裡的一千道牆)	Television Series	Director; Screenwriter; Producer	
2017	A Boy Named Flora A (花甲男孩轉大人)	Television Mini Series	Producer	
2017	Cloudy (順雲)		Producer	
2017	Jimu zhi jia (積木之家)	Television Mini Series	Producer	
2017	Wuweibazhen de suiyue: What She Put on the Table (五味八珍的歲月)	Television Mini Series	Producer	
2018	20 Zhihou (二十之後)	Television Series	Screenwriter; Producer	
2019	All is Well (你那邊怎樣，我這邊ok)	Television Series	Director; Producer	
2022	Who Says that Momma like the Moon? (誰說媽媽像月亮？)	Television Mini Series	Director; Screenwriter	
2022	The Leaking Bookstore (滴水的推理書屋)	Television Series	Producer	

== Awards and honors ==
- 1987 - Strawman - Golden Horse Film Festival - Best Original Screenplay Winner
- 1989 - Banana Paradise - Golden Horse Film Festival - Best Original screenplay Nominee
- 1990 - Strawman - Bogotá Film Festival - Golden Precolumbian Circle Winner
- 1996 - Accidental Legend - Busan International Film Festival - New Currents Award Nominee
- 1997 - Yours and Mine - Best Original screenplay Nominee
- 2004 - Bear Hug - Golden Horse Film Festival - Best Original screenplay Nominee
- 2005 - Bear Hug - Chinese Film Media Awards - Best Screenplay Winner
- 2008 - Wayward Kenting - Golden Bell Awards - Best Script for a TV series Winner
- 2009 - Police et vous - Golden Bell Awards - Best writing for a television series, Best Directing for a Television series Nominee
- 2011 - Count to 365 Days - Golden Bell Awards - Best Directing in a Mini-Series/TV Movies
- 2014 - Boys Can Fly - Golden Bell Awards - Best Writing for a Television Series Winner, Best Directing for a Television Series nominee
