= Judy Ongg =

Taiwanese-Japanese singer and actress (born 1950)

- Ongg in 2026
- Born: 24 January 1950 (age 76); Taipei, Taiwan
- Occupations: Singer, actress, author
- Years active: 1961–present
- Musical career
- Origin: Taipei, Taiwan
- Genres: Japanese pop, Mandopop
- Instrument: Vocals
- Labels: Columbia Records; CBS Sony; Toshiba EMI
- Website: judyongg.com

Judy Ongg (Chinese: 翁倩玉; Pe̍h-ōe-jī: Ong Chhèng-gio̍k; born 24 January 1950) is a Taiwanese-Japanese singer, actress, author, and woodblock printing artist. Born in Taipei, she graduated from The American School in Japan in 1969 and later from Sophia University in Tokyo, Japan, after which she became a naturalized Japanese citizen. Her career has spanned more than four decades.

== Biography ==
Ongg made her film debut in the 1961 Japan-U.S. production The Big Wave, based on the Pearl S. Buck novel. She enjoyed great popularity in Chinese-speaking countries, and won the Best Actress honor at the ninth Taipei Golden Horse Film Festival. She later won the Special Prize at the 19th Asia Film Festival.

She has recorded for Columbia Records, CBS Sony and Toshiba EMI. Her 1979 hit Miserarete sold two million copies and won the Japan Record Award at the 21st Japan Record Awards. Ongg has had at least one song appear on the NHK program Minna no Uta, and has appeared on the New Year's Eve spectacular Kōhaku Uta Gassen with songs "Miserarete" in 1979 and "Reika no Yume" in 1980. One of her most popular songs is "The Story of O-Shin", the Cantonese opening song for the hit drama, Oshin.

Other songs by Judy Ongg include her 1967 songs Tasogare no Akai Tsuki (English: "Red Moon at Dusk") and Yūhi No Koi, and her 1975 song Ai Wa Seimei.

In television, Ongg took roles in contemporary dramas and jidaigeki, including Edo o Kiru. She has also appeared in several stage productions. Judy was offered the role of Mariko (Lady Toda Buntaro) in the television miniseries Shogun, but declined the part. It was eventually played by Yoko Shimada.

In 1999, Ongg organized and produced the "Heart Aid" charity concert at the Tokyo International Forum to raise money for survivors of the Chi-Chi earthquake in Taiwan. Her film credits run to nine titles; television dramas, 31; variety, 11; radio, 2; commercials, 7. Her music credits include over 40 singles and albums. Judy has written five books. Her prints have received numerous awards.

== Filmography ==
=== Film ===
- The Big Wave (1961)
- Cyborg 009 (1966)
- Cyborg 009: Underground Duel (1967)
- Flying Phantom Ship (1969)
- Oiroke komikku (1970)
- Tracing to Expo '70 (1970)
- Zu Mountain: New Legend of the Zu Mountain Swordsmen (1983)
- Robby the Rascal (1985)
- Tanba Tetsuro no daireikai shindara odoroita!! (1990)
- The Pillow Book (1996)
- Vampire Hunter D: Bloodlust (2000)
- American Pastime (2007)
- Sunshine Women's Choir (2025)

=== Television series ===
- Oshizamurai Kiichihōgan (1973–74)
- Shin Hissatsu Karakurinin (1977–78)
- Spirit Chaser Aisha (1986)
- Storm Riders (1988)
- Kaseifu ha mita! 19 (2001)
- Tweeny Witches (2003)
- Doctor-X Season 3 (2014)
- Zeni no Sensou (2015)
- Sunny (2024)

== See also ==
- Taiwanese art
