= Yours and Mine =

1997 film

- Film poster
- Directed by: Shaudi Wang
- Written by: Shaudi Wang
- Produced by: Huang i-Ming; Wang Ming-Tai
- Starring: Shiang-chyi Chen; Ku Pao-ming; Cheng-sheng Lin; Liang-Tso Liu; Pai Bing-bing
- Cinematography: Tsai Cheng-tai
- Edited by: Tu Duu-chih; Tang Shiang-chu
- Production company: Rice Film International
- Release date: 21 June 1997 (Taiwan)
- Running time: 114 minutes
- Country: Taiwan
- Languages: Mandarin; Taiwanese Hokkien; English

Yours and Mine (Chinese: 我的神经病, Wo de shen jing bing) is a 1997 Taiwanese comedy film directed by Shaudi Wang. The film was selected as the Taiwanese entry for the Best Foreign Language Film at the 70th Academy Awards, but was not accepted as a nominee.

== Cast ==
- Shiang-chyi Chen
- Ku Pao-ming
- Cheng-sheng Lin
- Liang-Tso Liu
- Pai Bing-bing

== See also ==
- List of submissions to the 70th Academy Awards for Best Foreign Language Film
- List of Taiwanese submissions for the Academy Award for Best Foreign Language Film
