= Sweet Degeneration =

1997 Taiwanese drama film

- Film poster
- Directed by: Lin Cheng-sheng
- Written by: Lin Cheng-sheng
- Produced by: Hsu Li-kong
- Starring: Pen-yu Chang
- Cinematography: Cheng-hui Tsai
- Edited by: Chen Po-Wen
- Production companies: Zoom Hunt International; NHK
- Release date: January 1, 1997 (Taiwan)
- Running time: 118 minutes
- Country: Taiwan
- Language: Taiwanese

Sweet Degeneration (Chinese: 放浪; pinyin: Fang lang) is a 1997 Taiwanese drama film written and directed by Lin Cheng-sheng. It was entered into the 48th Berlin International Film Festival.

== Cast ==
- Pen-yu Chang as Mei-li
- Shiang-chyi Chen as Ju-feng
- Shih-huang Chen as Father
- Leon Dai as Ah-hai
- Chao-yin Hsiao as Hsiao-lien
- Tze-min Hsiao as Mei-li's friend
- Kang-sheng Lee as Chun-sheng
- Su-feng Lee as Motel chef
- Chih-long Lin as Ah-ching
- Li-jung Lu as Prostitute
- Ming-Ching Lu as Ah-biao
- Mei-fong Yen as Motel chef
