= Buddha Bless America =

- Film poster
- Chinese: 太平天國
- Hanyu Pinyin: Tàipíng Tiānguó
- Directed by: Wu Nien-jen
- Written by: Wu Nien-jen
- Produced by: Pi Jian-xin
- Cinematography: Mark Lee Ping-Bing
- Edited by: Chen Po-wen
- Music by: Jiang Hsiao-wen
- Production companies: Taiwan Film Center 聯登國際股份有限公司
- Distributed by: Upland Films Corporate Limited
- Release date: 20 July 1996
- Running time: 109 minutes
- Country: Taiwan
- Language: Taiwanese

Buddha Bless America (Chinese: 太平天國; Pinyin: Tàipíng Tiānguó) is a 1996 Taiwanese feature film directed by Wu Nien-jen, a scriptwriter turned director. It is a sarcastic comedy set in the early 1960s about a Sino-American joint military exercise in a small village in southern Taiwan. The encounter between the villagers and the unfamiliar American soldiers in the film provides comic incidents of cultural clashes as well as critical reflection on American imperialism and cultural colonialism. This film was selected to be in competition for the Golden Lion award of the 53rd Venice International Film Festival.

== Plot ==
A Sino-American joint military exercise was chosen to be held in a small village in southern Taiwan. When the military representative came to the village to negotiate, based on past experience the villagers were not willing to cooperate. Wen-sheng, nicknamed “Teacher” by the villagers, was a fired teacher from the elementary school, who admired everything American. He was asked by the military officer to convince the villagers. He told them that the government would do what it was determined to do so it was futile to object. But since it involved the Americans he believed that there would surely be compensation this time. Persuaded, the villagers all moved into an elementary school’s classrooms for temporary shelters. A nightclub with local bar girls was also built to make a profit while the American soldiers were around. The damage caused by the military exercise proved to be worse than anticipated, even ancestral graves were crushed by the tanks. The villagers were so angry that they blamed Wen-sheng for cheating them into the deal and swarmed to the American military camp to protest but the soldiers’ gunshots chased them away. Frustrated and desperate, they decided to steal from the American military camp for compensation. Wen-sheng’s brother, Wen-xian, had lost two of his fingers in an accident in the Japanese factory he worked in, which Wen-sheng had preserved in salty water. Believing in the advancement of American technology, Wen-sheng was hoping the arriving Americans could stitch them back for his brother so he took him to the American military camp to see the doctor. Due to the Taiwanese translator’s deliberate mistranslation, the doctor thought the two brothers were begging for money. Wen-sheng asked the translator to tell the American doctor that they were no beggars and left, giving up on this wishful thinking. The villagers’ stealing was busted and an American officer came to the shelter with military policemen. Once again his apology for causing the inconvenience of the villagers was mistranslated as a threat of death penalty and national shame. Meanwhile, Wen-sheng and his brother also went to steal two hug boxes from the military camp for revenge, which turned out to be two coffins with dead bodies in them, which they brought back and gave them blessings before leaving them on the roadside near the camp. When the Americans finally left after the military exercise was over, the film’s intertitle asks: “Have Americans really left?”

== Cast ==
Role	Actor
Lin Wen-sheng (林文盛/仙仔)	Lin Cheng-sheng(林正盛)
Wen-cheng’s wife	Jiang shu-na (江淑娜)
Lin Wen-xian (林文憲)	Ken Yang (楊宗憲)
Ah Zong(阿宗)	Li Xin-zong (李信宗)
Ah Po (阿婆)	Bai Ming-hua(白明華)
Village Chief	Wu Tian-luo (吳天羅)
Village Chief’s Wife	Li Xiu (李秀)
Principal	Cai Jin-xing (蔡進興)
Soldier	Chen Zi-wei (陳自為)
Interpreter	Chen Yong-de (陳永德)
American Soldier	Paul Baker
American Military Surgeon	Gregory Silas

== Production ==
The title of the film, Buddha Bless America in English is not directly translated from its Chinese name, Taiping Tianguo. In Chinese history, Taiping Tianguo refers to an anti-imperialist rebellion, led by Hong Xiuquan in the Qing Dynasty. The literal meaning of the movie, Taiping Tianguo, refers to “a peaceful kingdom from heaven.” Nicole Huang suggests that "the film visualizes how a destructive force, in the name of peace and prosperity, descends from the sky/heaven."

The cabbage field in the film was not a real location but a set constructed by the crew and supporting army soldiers, which took three hours to complete. In total, a hundred thousands kilograms of cabbage were placed on the field.

Wu Nien-Jen also released a 2-CD album of the film entitled Buddha Bless America: Nien-jen Love (太平天國念真情) distributed by Rock Records (滾石唱片) in 1996, including his monologues about the shooting locations of the movies. In one of the soundtracks, he mentioned that some of the American soldiers were played by students who came from Hungarian.

The following information about the film’s production can be found in Wu Nien-jen’s book In Search of Buddha Bless America (1996):

- The main shooting location of Buddha Bless America is Hengchun and Jiu Ru, Pingtung in southern Taiwan. Some of the scenes of the military base were filmed in the Chunrih Elementary School at Pingtung. The scenery shot of the sea was filmed at Jiupeng (九棚) to key the American navy on the movie.
- Chiang Shu-Na started her film career with Buddha Bless America as the wife of Wen-sheng. Wu Nien-jen originally had Lin Cheng-sheng (林正盛) and Ke Shu-qing (柯淑卿), who are a couple in real life, to play the couple in the film and the casting was announced to the press before the production. It was the producer Yang Deng-kui (楊登魁) who recommended that Chiang Shu-Na (江淑娜) play the role. Ke Shu-qing still participated in the production of the film as a crew member.
- In the beginning, The Ministry of National Defense (國防部) refused to provide military assistance to the production due to the concern that the comedy would present a negative image of the army. After the negotiation, the militaries engaged in the production as actors and also crews. They provided military vehicles and artillery for the construction of the scenes.

== Awards ==
The movie was nominated for the Golden Lion award of the 53rd Venice International Film Festival.
