= Super Citizen Ko =

1995 film

- Film poster
- Directed by: Wan Jen
- Written by: Wan Jen; Liao Ching-sung; Wu Nien-jen
- Produced by: Liao Ching-sung
- Starring: Ko I-chen; Lin Yang; Sean Su; Ming-Ming Sue
- Cinematography: Stone Shen (Shen Rei-Yuan)
- Edited by: Liao Ching-sung
- Music by: Fan Tsung-pei; Lee Shou-Chuan
- Production company: Wan Jen Films
- Release date: 1995 (Taiwan)
- Running time: 104 minutes
- Country: Taiwan
- Language: Taiwanese

Super Citizen Ko (Chinese: 超級大國民; pinyin: Chāo jí dà guó mín; lit. 'Superpower Citizen') is a 1995 Taiwanese drama film directed by Wan Jen. The film was selected as the Taiwanese entry for the Best Foreign Language Film at the 68th Academy Awards, but was not accepted as a nominee.

== Synopsis ==
After being imprisoned during the White Terror for over 30 years between the 1950s and the 1990s, Ko is released and searches for his best friend Chen, a fellow political prisoner who, unbeknownst to Ko, was executed. As he learns more about what happened to Chen, he also discovers more about himself as he visits his former associates, manages his relationship with his daughter, and his idealistic nature clashes with the period's political corruption.

== Cast ==
- Ko I-chen as Chen Cheng-l
- Lin Yang as Ko L-Sheng
- Sean Su
- Ming-Ming Sue as Ko Hsu-Chin

== See also ==
- List of submissions to the 68th Academy Awards for Best Foreign Language Film
- List of Taiwanese submissions for the Academy Award for Best Foreign Language Film
