= Lin Cheng-sheng =

Taiwanese film director

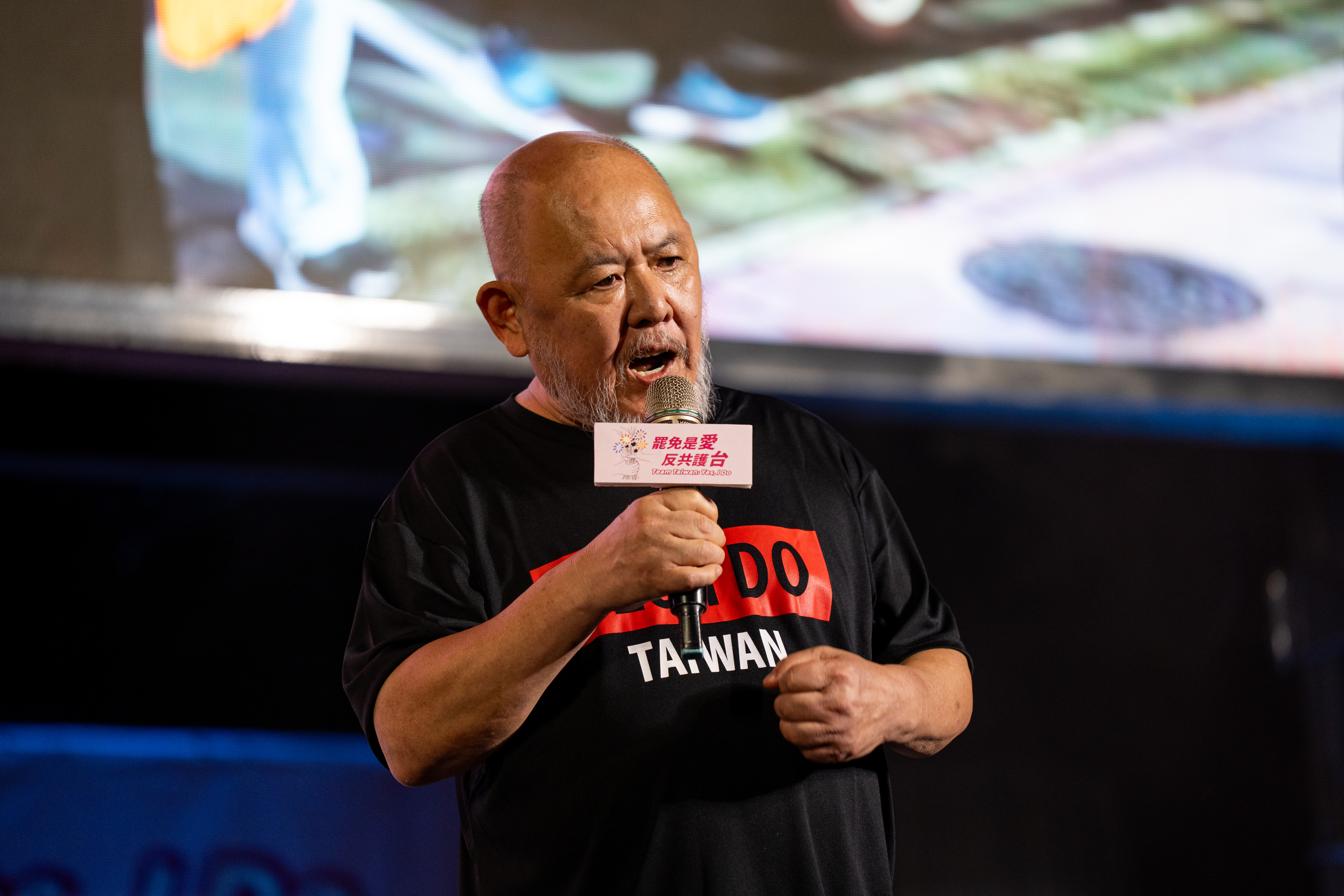
- Lin Cheng-sheng during a protest- 2025
- Born: 31 March 1959 (age 67); Taitung, Taiwan
- Occupation: Film director
- Awards: Silver Bear for Best Director; 2001 Betelnut Beauty

Lin Cheng-sheng (Chinese: 林正盛; pinyin: Lin Zheng Sheng; born 31 March 1959) is a Taiwanese film director. His 1997 film Sweet Degeneration was entered into the 48th Berlin International Film Festival. He won the Silver Bear for Best Director for Betelnut Beauty in 2001.

== Filmography ==
=== Director ===
==== Narratives ====
- 1996: A Drifting Life (春花夢露)
- 1997: Murmur of Youth (美麗在唱歌)
- 1998: Sweet Degeneration (放浪)
- 1999: March of Happiness (天馬茶房)
- 2001: Betelnut Beauty (愛你愛我)
- 2003: Robinson's Crusoe (魯賓遜漂流記)
- 2005: The Moon Also Rises (月光下，我記得)
- 2013: 27°C – Loaf Rock (世界第一麥方)
- TBA: The Future keeps coming and coming: goodbye to the age of solitude (literally translated from 未來一直來一直來之告別孤寂年代; in production)

==== Documentaries ====
- 2008: My Ocean (海洋練習曲)
- 2010: Twinkle Twinkle Little Stars (一閃一閃亮晶晶)
- 2015: One journey, one mission (有任務的旅行)

=== Actor ===
- Tropical Fish (1995)
- Buddha Bless America (1996)
- Yours and Mine (1997)
