= Tropical Fish (film) =

Tropical Fish 熱帶魚 Rèdài Yú
- Taiwanese DVD cover
- Directed by: Chen Yu-hsun
- Written by: Chen Yu-hsun
- Produced by: Chung Hu-pin; Jiang Feng-Chyt
- Starring: Lin Cheng-sheng; Lin Chia-hung; Wen Ying
- Cinematography: Liao Pen-jung
- Edited by: Lei Chen-ching
- Music by: Wu Bai & China Blue; Yu Kuang-Yen (as Max Yu)
- Production company: Central Pictures Company
- Release date: August 1, 1995 (Taiwan)
- Running time: 108 minutes
- Country: Taiwan
- Languages: Taiwanese; Mandarin Chinese

Japanese cover

Japanese cover

Tropical Fish (Chinese: 熱帶魚; pinyin: Rèdài Yú; Pe̍h-ōe-jī: Jia̍t-tài Hî) is a 1995 Taiwanese comedy-drama film written and directed by Chen Yu-hsun. It is an example of New Taiwanese Cinema.

== Plot ==
The movie tells the story of Liu Chih-chiang (played by Lin Chia-hung [林嘉宏]), a disaffected Taipei high school student who is kidnapped and taken by Ah Ching (played by the filmmaker Lin Cheng-sheng) to rural Chiayi County in southern Taiwan.

== Cast ==
- Lin Cheng-sheng
- Lin Chia-hung
- Wen Ying

== Locations ==
Chih-chiang's school scenes were filmed at Bailing Senior High School (百齡高中) in Shilin, Taipei, while several other scenes were filmed in Daan District. The kidnappers hold Chih-chiang in Dongshi, a coastal Chiayi County township noted for its oyster production. The end of the film shows the business district of Dunhua Road in Taipei.

== Music ==
In addition to the music score, two songs by Wu Bai & China Blue, "This Continuous Sinking" (繼續墮落) (from their 1994 album Wanderer's Love Song) and "Go to the Graveyard" (墓仔埔也敢去) are featured in the movie. Different (live) versions of both songs were released on Wu Bai & China Blue's 1995 live album (伍佰的LIVE).

== Awards ==
At Taiwan's 1995 Golden Horse Film Festival, Chen Yu-hsun won the award for Best Screenplay Originally Written for the Screen and Wen Ying (文英) won Best Supporting Actress for her role as Ah Yi (阿姨). Chen Yu-hsun was also nominated for a Golden Leopard for the film at the 1995 Locarno International Film Festival.
