= 4th Asian Film Awards =

2010 edition of award ceremony

- Date: March 22, 2010

Highlights
- Best Film: Mother (2009 film)
- Most awards: Mother (2009 film) (3)
- Most nominations: Bodyguards and Assassins (6)

The 4th Asian Film Awards was given in a ceremony on 22 March 2010 as part of the Hong Kong International Film Festival.

== Nominees and winners ==
=== Best Film ===
- Winner: Mother (South Korea)
  - City of Life and Death (China)
  - Lola (Philippines)
  - Parade (Japan)
  - No Puedo Vivir Sin Ti (Taiwan)
  - Bodyguards and Assassins (Hong Kong)

=== Best Director ===
- Winner: Lu Chuan, City of Life and Death (China)
  - Brillante Mendoza, Lola (Philippines)
  - Yonfan, Prince of Tears (Hong Kong/Taiwan)
  - Sono Sion, Love Exposure (Japan)
  - Bong Joon-ho, Mother (South Korea)
  - Asghar Farhadi, About Elly (Iran)

=== Best Actor ===
- Winner: Wang Xueqi, Bodyguards and Assassins (Hong Kong)
  - Asano Tadanobu, Villon's Wife (Japan)
  - Huang Bo, Cow (China)
  - Song Kang-ho, Thirst (South Korea)
  - Matsumoto Hitoshi, Symbol (Japan)

=== Best Actress ===
- Winner: Kim Hye-ja, Mother (South Korea)
  - Li Bingbing, The Message (China)
  - Bae Doona, Air Doll (Japan)
  - Sandrine Pinna, Yang Yang (Taiwan)
  - Matsu Takako, Villon's Wife (Japan)

=== Best Newcomer ===
- Winner: Ng Meng Hui, At the End of Daybreak (Malaysia/Hong Kong/South Korea)
  - Zhu Xuan, Prince of Tears (Taiwan/Hong Kong)
  - Li Yuchun, Bodyguards and Assassins (Hong Kong)
  - Kim Sae-ron, A Brand New Life (South Korea)
  - Sonam Kapoor, Delhi 6 (India)

=== Best Supporting Actor ===
- Winner: Nicholas Tse, Bodyguards and Assassins (Hong Kong)
  - Eita, Dear Doctor (Japan)
  - Huang Xiaoming, The Message (China)
  - Won Bin, Mother (South Korea)
  - Tou Chung-hua, The Warrior and the Wolf (China)

=== Best Supporting Actress ===
- Winner: Kara Hui, At the End of Daybreak (Malaysia/Hong Kong/South Korea)
  - Yan Ni, Cow (China)
  - Kim Kkot-bi, Breathless (South Korea)
  - Ryōko Hirosue, Villon's Wife (Japan)
  - Sakura Ando, A Crowd of Three (Japan)

=== Best Screenwriter ===
- Winner: Bong Joon-ho and Park Eun-kyo, Mother (South Korea)
  - Hong Sang-soo, Like You Know It All (South Korea)
  - Phan Đăng Di, Adrift (Vietnam)
  - Wai Ka-fai and Au Kin-yee, Written By (Hong Kong)
  - Asghar Farhadi, About Elly (Iran)

=== Best Cinematographer ===
- Winner: Cao Yu, City of Life and Death (China)
  - Cheng Siu-keung, Vengeance (Hong Kong)
  - Chung Chung-hoon, Thirst (South Korea)
  - Ly Thai Dung, Adrift (Vietnam)
  - Jake Pollock, Yang Yang (Taiwan)

=== Best Production Designer ===
- Winner: Alain-Pascal Housiaux and Patrick Deche, Face (Taiwan)
  - Kenneth Mak, Bodyguards and Assassins (Hong Kong)
  - Hayashida Yuji, Yatterman (Japan)
  - Xiao Haihang, The Message (China)
  - Ryu Seong-hie, Thirst (South Korea)

=== Best Composer ===
- Winner: Lo Ta-Yu, Vengeance (Hong Kong)
  - Jang Young-gyu and Lee Byung-hoon, Running Turtle (South Korea)
  - Liu Tong, City of Life and Death (China)
  - Saito Kazuyoshi, Fish Story (film) (Japan)
  - Hoang Ngoc Dai, Adrift (Vietnam)

=== Best Editor ===
- Winner: Lee Chatametikool, Karaoke (Malaysia)
  - Kong Chi-leung and Chan Chi-wai, Overhead (Hong Kong)
  - Moon Sae-kyung, Mother (South Korea)
  - Kats Serraon, Lola (Philippines)
  - Tang Hua, Zhang Yifan and Du Yuan, Crazy Racer (China)

=== Best Visual Effects ===
- Winner: Yi Zeonhyoung, Thirst (South Korea)
  - Wang Jianxiong, Jimmy Chen and Li Liping, Crazy Racer (China)
  - Seshita Hiroyuki, Symbol (Japan)
  - Fujita Takuya and Nozaki Koji, Goemon (Japan)
  - Ng Yuen-fai, Tam Kai-kwan and Chas Chau Chi-shing, The Storm Warriors (Hong Kong)

=== Best Costume Designer ===
- Winner: Christian Lacroix, Anne Dunsford and Wang Chia-Hui, Face (Taiwan)
  - Dora Ng, Bodyguards and Assassins (Hong Kong)
  - Shim Hyun-soeb, The Sword with No Name (South Korea)
  - Tina Kalivas and Vaughan Alexander, Goemon (Japan)
  - Wada Emi, The Warrior and the Wolf (China)

=== Special awards ===
- Lifetime Achievement Award: Amitabh Bachchan (India)
- Asian Film Award for Outstanding Contribution to Asian Cinema: Zhang Yimou (China)
- The Asian Film Awards for 2009’s Top-Grossing Film Director: John Woo, Red Cliff Part II (China)
