= 46th Golden Horse Awards =

Award ceremony for Chinese-language films of 2008 and 2009

- Promotional poster
- Date: November 28, 2009
- Site: New Taipei City Hall, New Taipei City, Taiwan
- Hosted by: Matilda Tao
- Preshow hosts: Pink Yang and Tang Tsung-sheng
- Organised by: Taipei Golden Horse Film Festival Executive Committee

Highlights
- Best Film: Cannot Live Without You
- Best Actor: Nick Cheung / Huang Bo; The Beast Stalker / Cow
- Best Actress: Li Bingbing; The Message
- Most awards: Cannot Live Without You (5)
- Most nominations: Like a Dream (9)

Television in Taiwan
- Network: Azio TV
- Ratings: 2.05 (average)

The 46th Golden Horse Awards was held on November 28, 2009.

== Winners and nominees ==
Winners are listed first and highlighted in boldface.

**Best Feature Film**: **Cannot Live Without You**; Cow; Crazy Racer; Face; Like a Dream	**Best Short Film**: **Sleeping With Her**; Invisible Loneliness; Ending Cut
**Best Documentary**: **KJ - Music and Life**; Baseball Boys; Let The Wind Carry Me	**Best Animation Feature** -
**Best Director**: **Leon Dai − Cannot Live Without You**; Guan Hu — Cow; Tsai Ming Liang — Face; Clara Law — Like a Dream	**Best Leading Actor**: **Nick Cheung − The Beast Stalker**; **Huang Bo − Cow**; Akira Chen — Cannot Live Without You; Daniel Wu — Like a Dream
**Best Leading Actress**: **Li Bingbing − The Message**; Sandrine Pinna — Yang Yang; Yuan Quan — Like a Dream; Zhou Xun — The Message	**Best Supporting Actor**: **Wang Xueqi − Forever Enthralled**; Tsai Chen-nan — Ending Cut; Jag Huang — Yang Yang; Zhang Hanyu — The Equation of Love and Death
**Best Supporting Actress**: **Kara Wai — At the End of Daybreak**; Liu Yin-shang — Sleeping With Her; Lu Yi-ching — A Place of One's Own; Zhang Ziyi — Forever Enthralled	**Best New Performer**: **Yu Shaoqun — Forever Enthralled**; Akira Chen — Cannot Live Without You; Her Sy-Huoy — Yang Yang; Michelle Chen — Hear Me
**Best Original Screenplay**: **Leon Dai and Akira Chen — Cannot Live Without You**; Cui Siwei, Xing Aina, Wang Hongwei, Wang Yao, Zhou Zhiyong, Yue Xiaojun and Zhang Cheng — Crazy Racer; Cheng Wen-tang, Cheng Jin-fen and Chang I-feng — Tears; Eddie Fong and Clara Law — Like a Dream	**Best Adapted Screenplay**: **Guan Hu — Cow**; Chen Kuo-fu and Zhang Jialu — The Message; Gu Xiaoni — Death Dowry
**Best Cinematography**: **Cao Yu — City of Life and Death**; Song Xiaofei — Cow; Sion Michel ACS — Like a Dream; Zhao Xiaoshi — Wheat	**Best Visual Effects**: **Wang Jianxiong, Jimmy Chen and Li Liping — Crazy Racer**; Jiang Weibin and Lei Zaixing — Da Ming Palace; Don Ma — City of Life and Death; Hu Xuan and Xiao Yang — The Message
**Best Art Direction**: **Lee Tian-jue, Patrick Dechesne and Alain-Pascal Housiaux — Face**; HuaTa-Hua — Cannot Live Without You; Yee Chung-man and Penny Tsai — Like a Dream; Shi Haiying and Yang Haoyu — The Message	**Best Makeup & Costume Design**: **Christian Lacroix, Wang Chia-hui and Anne Dunsford — Face**; Emi Wada — The Warrior and the Wolf; Chen Tong Xun — Forever Enthralled; Ye Jingtian — The Message
**Best Action Choreography**: **Sammo Hung and Leung Siu-hung — Ip Man**; Tung Wai and Bruce Law — The Beast Stalker; Chen Guanlong and Qin Haiqiang — Cow; Philippe Decouflé — Face	**Best Original Film Score**: **Dou Wei and Bi Xiaodi — The Equation of Love and Death**; Lim Giong — Yang Yang; Paul Grabowsky — Like a Dream; Liu Xing — Wheat
**Best Original Film Song**: **"For My Heart" — Death Dowry**; **Lyrics： Zeng Yan**; **Composer： Zeng Yan**; **Performers： Tao Hong and Tan Weiwei**; "Sayonala" — Tears; Lyrics： Yang Ta-Cheng and ENNO; Composer： ENNO; Performer： ENNO; "The Flow of Clouds" — Young Spirit of a Taiwanese Opera Singer; Lyrics： Peng Zhang-zhan; Composer： Peng Zhang-zhan; Performer： Christine Shu	**Best Film Editing**: **Cheung King-wai — KJ - Music and Life**; Leon Dai — Cannot Live Without You; Kong Jinlei — Cow; Zhang Yifan, Du Yuan and Tang Hua — Crazy Racer
**Best Sound Effects**: **Cheung King-wai — KJ - Music and Life**; Tu Duu-chih — Yang Yang; Tu Duu-chih — Like a Dream; Wang Changrui — Wheat	**Outstanding Taiwanese Film of the Year**: **Cannot Live Without You**; Let The Wind Carry Me; Yang Yang
**FIPRESCI Prize** **(award for first and second features)**: **Yang Yang**	**Outstanding Taiwanese Filmmaker of the Year**: **Lee Lung-yue**; Jack Kao; Leon Dai
**Lifetime Achievement Award**: **Ming Ji**	**Special Contribution Award**: **George Wang**
