= Edison Song =

Taiwanese actor (born 1994)

- 宋柏緯
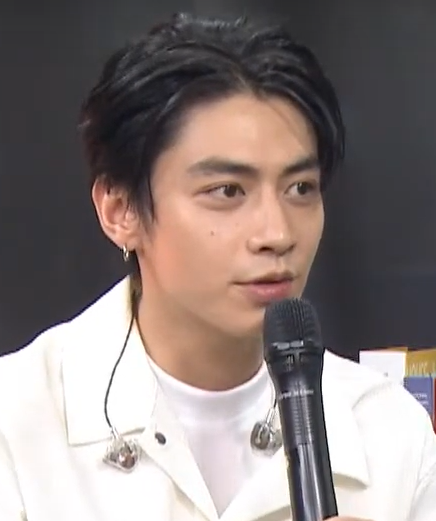
- Song in November 2023
- Born: Song Po-wei; 4 November 1994 (age 31); Taiwan
- Education: Jinwen University of Science and Technology (BBus)
- Occupation: Actor
- Years active: 2014–present

Edison Song Po-wei (Chinese: 宋柏緯; born 4 November 1994) is a Taiwanese actor. He made his acting debut with a minor role in Partners in Crime (2014), and gained public recognition for his role as Ho Shih-jung in the PTS series Days We Stared at the Sun II (2017), for which he received a nomination for Best Supporting Actor in the 53rd Golden Bell Awards. He also landed starring roles in the films Killed by Rock and Roll (2018), Stand By Me (2019), Bad Education (2022), and Love Is a Gun (2023).

== Early life and education ==
Song was born on 4 November 1994. He has an older sister, and grew up in Taipei. In high school, he aspired to become a jazz musician and was a member of the school's rock music club, but was discovered by a talent scout while accompanying his girlfriend to a casting audition. He was initially cast in Shen Ko-shang's Siren Song, a drama film adapted from Chang Kuei-hsing's novel of the same name, but the project did not materialize. Due to his parents' objections to studying performing arts, Song attended and later graduated from Jinwen University of Science and Technology with a degree in international commerce. However, he developed an interest in acting and persuaded his parents to support him, beginning to film advertisements and music videos at the age of 19 while still at university.

== Career ==
Song made his acting debut in 2014 alongside his girlfriend in the crime film Partners in Crime, and he had a minor role as a student arguing with Austin Lin's character in the romance film At Cafe 6. He began his acting career in earnest in 2017, starring as Ho Shih-jung, an idealistic high school student involved in social activism, in the PTS series Days We Stared at the Sun II. Director Cheng Yu-chieh approached Song after watching a 2015 short film Laser in which he starred, inviting him to join the project a year before production began. Since Song did not participate in the Sunflower Student Movement, he prepared for his role by reading books and watching documentaries about the protest. He subsequently landed starring roles in the homosexual-themed web series HIStory as Feng He, who falls in love with his stepbrother (played by Duke Wu), as well as in the horror web series Ghost High School. Song received nominations for Best Leading Actor in a Miniseries for Ghost High School and Best Supporting Actor in a Miniseries for Days We Stared at the Sun II in the 53rd Golden Bell Awards. He also had supporting roles in the drama films The Gangsters Daughter and The App from Heaven that same year.

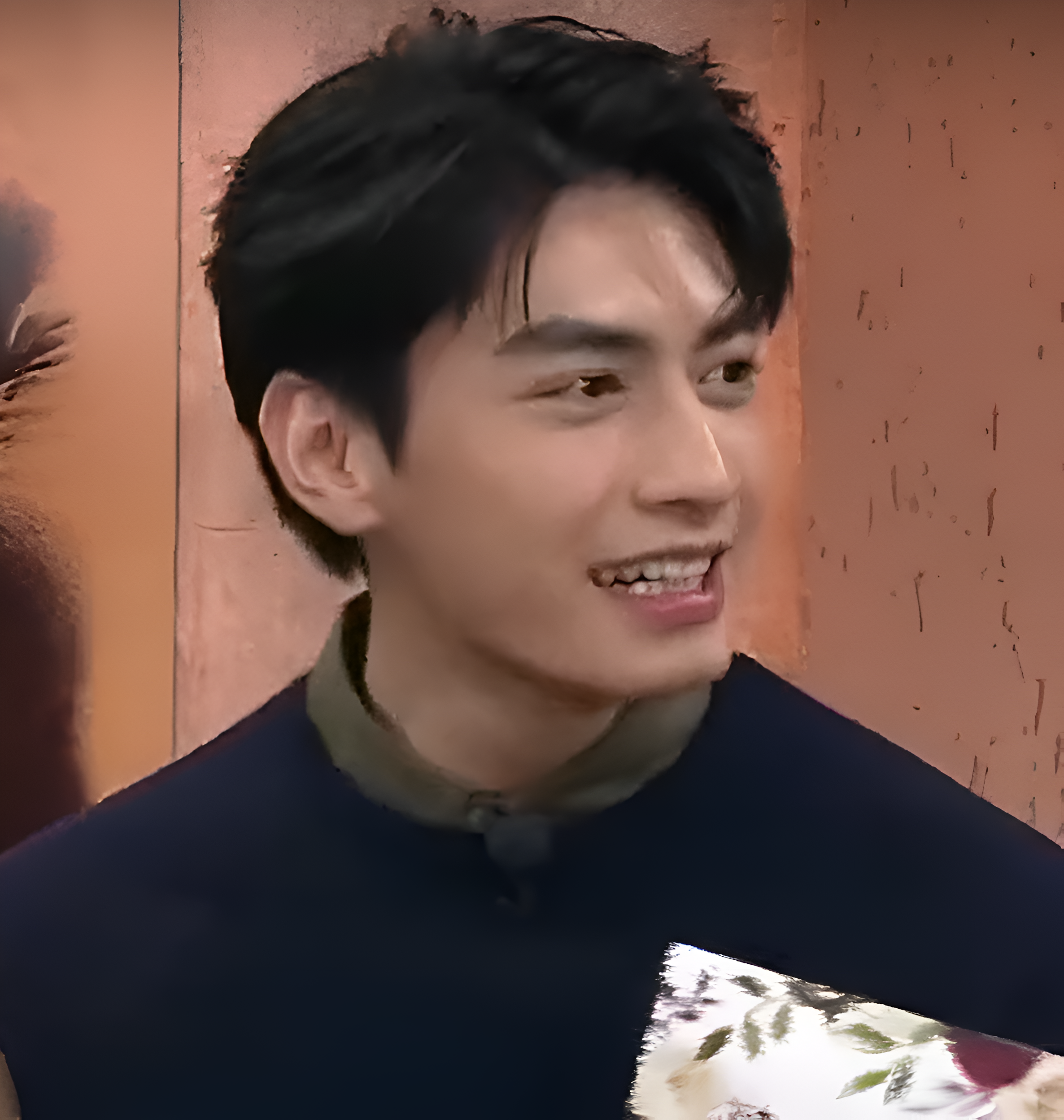
Song interviewed by Elle Taiwan in March 2020

In 2018, Song starred as Xiaosi, the lead singer of the fictional band Dictator, in the drama film Killed by Rock and Roll. Han Cheung of Taipei Times remarked on his casting, noting that all the band members in the film were played by real-life musicians except for Song, whom he described as a "heartthrob". In 2019, Song was cast as the male lead, Qu Shou-zhi, in the coming-of-age romance series Brave to Love alongside Gingle Wang. He then took on another lead role as Mai-zi, a university student who develops a relationship with a junior played by Ivy Shao, in the romance film Stand By Me. Song appeared as one of the three leads in the fantasy series Moonlight Romance, and as part of a love triangle in the romance series I, Myself, alongside Sun Ke-fang and Sam Lin. He also had a supporting role as Huang Li-tse in the thriller series The Magician on the Skywalk, and made cameo appearances in the Netflix series Light the Night and the Disney+ series Women in Taipei.

In 2022, Song played Yuan-shou, the chairman of a high school guitar club who is secretly loved by the female lead (played by Moon Lee), in the film My Best Friend's Breakfast. That same year, he received his breakout role as Han, an enabler of a high school gang, alongside Kent Tsai and Berant Zhu in Kai Ko's crime film Bad Education. John Berra of Screen Daily praised the "fresh-faced leads" and commended Song for distinctly portraying his character's enabling nature. He also had a starring role as a friend of Sweet Potato (played by Lee Hong-chi) in the 2023 drama film Love Is a Gun, although John Berra of Screen Daily described his role as an "inconsequential cameo". He is set to star in the upcoming horror series Bloody Smart.

== Filmography ==
=== Film ===
Year	Title	Role	Notes/Ref.
2014	Partners in Crime	Rui-teng (瑞騰)	
2016	At Cafe 6	Zhang Zheng-ting (張正延)	
2017	The Gangsters Daughter	Sen (阿森)	
2017	The App from Heaven	Huang Hsing-che (黃星徹)	
2018	Killed by Rock and Roll	Little Four (小四)	
2019	Stand By Me	Mai-zi (麥子)	
2022	My Best Friend's Breakfast	Yuan-shou (張元碩)	
2022	Bad Education	Han (韓吉)	
2023	Love Is a Gun	Sweet Potato's friend	

=== Television ===
Year	Title	Role	Notes/Ref.
2017	HIStory	Feng He (豐河)	Main role (season 1)
2017	Ghost High School	Lai Guan-yin (賴冠霖)	Main role
2017	Days We Stared at the Sun II	Ho Shih-jung (何士戎)	Main role
2019	Brave to Love	Qu Shou-zhi (瞿守治)	Main role
2020	Moonlight Romance	You Tian-le (游天樂)	Main role
2020	I, Myself	Ting Chih-ming (丁志明)	Main role
2021	The Magician on the Skywalk	Huang Li-tse (王立澤)	Recurring role
2021	Light the Night	Mountain climbing student	Guest appearance
2022	Women in Taipei	Shen Hua-ching (沈華慶)	Cameo
2025	Tabloid	TBA	Main role
TBA	Bloody Smart	TBA	Main role

== Awards and nominations ==
Year	Award	Category	Work	Result	Ref.
2018	53rd Golden Bell Awards	Best Leading Actor in a Miniseries or Television Film	Ghost High School	Nominated	
2018	53rd Golden Bell Awards	Best Supporting Actor in a Miniseries or Television Film	Days We Stared at the Sun II	Nominated	
