= 30th Hundred Flowers Awards =

Chinese film awards ceremony in 2010

The 30th Hundred Flowers Awards was a ceremony held on October 16, 2010 in Jianyin, Jiangsu province. The nominees were announced on September 22.

== Awards and nominations ==
=== Best Film ===
Winner	Winning film	Nominees
N/A	The Founding of a Republic	* Runner-up: Mulan * Runner-up: Jing Tian Dong Di * If You Are the One * The Message

=== Best Director ===
Winner	Winning film	Nominees
Feng Xiaogang	If You Are the One	* Han Sanping, Huang Jianxin for The Founding of a Republic * Chen Kuo-fu, Gao Qunshu for The Message * Teddy Chan for Bodyguards and Assassins * Wang Jia, Shen Dong for Jing Tian Dong Di

=== Best Actor ===
Winner	Winning film	Nominees
Chen Kun	Painted Skin	* Zhang Guoli for The Founding of a Republic * Huang Xiaoming for The Message * Donnie Yen for Ip Man * Hou Yong for Jing Tian Dong Di

=== Best Actress ===
Winner	Winning film	Nominees
Zhao Wei	Mulan	* Zhou Xun for Painted Skin * Bai Jing for Iron Man * Shu Qi for If You Are the One * Fan Bingbing for Bodyguards and Assassins

=== Best Supporting Actor ===
Winner	Winning film	Nominees
Alec Su	The Message	* Jaycee Chan for Mulan * Feng Yuanzheng for If You Are the One * Huang Bo for Iron Man

=== Best Supporting Actress ===
Winner	Winning film	Nominees
Xu Qing	The Founding of a Republic	* Sun Li for Painted Skin * Che Xiao for If You Are the One * Ma Su for Iron Man
