= Zero Day Attack =

Taiwanese television series

- Chinese: 零日攻擊
- Hanyu Pinyin: Língrì Gōngjī
- Genre: Speculative fiction
- Written by: Cheng Hsin-mei; Cheng Wan-pi; Huang Pen-jen; Lin Chih-ju; Meng Pai; Su I-hsuan; Ting Chi-wen; Wu Zi-en
- Directed by: Hung Po-hao; Wu Zi-en; Su I-hsuan; Diana Hsuan Chao; Yi Liu; Cheng Hsin-mei; Hung Po-hao; Lo Ging-zim; Lin Chih-ju; Akira
- Starring: Issey Takahashi; Cindy Lien; Chapman To; Kaiser Chuang; Ko I-chen; Chen Yuu; Akira Chen; Yu An-shun; Cheng Yu-Chieh
- Country of origin: Taiwan
- Original languages: Mandarin; Taiwanese; Japanese; English
- No. of episodes: 10

Production
- Executive producer: Lin Shih-ken
- Producer: Cheng Shin-mei
- Production location: Taipei
- Production companies: Zero Day Cultural and Creative Co., Ltd.
- Budget: NT$230,000,000

Original release
- Release: August 2 (Taiwan) – October 4, 2025 (Taiwan)

Zero Day Attack (Chinese: 零日攻擊) is a 2025 Taiwanese speculative fiction television series, set against the backdrop of a hypothetical invasion of Taiwan by China's People's Liberation Army. It aired at 9:00 PM (UTC+8) on August 2, 2025, in Taiwan, and aired in Japan via Amazon Prime on August 15, 2025, the 80th anniversary of the announcement of the surrender of Japan.

== Plot ==
The elderly incumbent president of Taiwan loses to a younger female challenger (Janet Hsieh). As the political transition is underway and inauguration day approaches, a PLANAF Shaanxi Y-8 antisubmarine warfare aircraft goes down in the waters southeast of Taiwan (implied to be an act of surreptitious internal sabotage as part of a false flag operation), with the plane's sole surviving injured crewman being rescued and picked up by a nearby ROCN warship. Under the guise of conducting a search and rescue operation for the missing plane, the People's Republic of China implements a naval blockade surrounding Taiwan, leading to the complete halt of international shipping to the island, and a subsequent stock market crash and bank run. The United States and Japan increase their military readiness levels as the Taiwanese military mobilizes in preparation for invasion, with foreign governments starting to evacuate their citizens from Taiwan.

== Production ==
The series was announced at a press conference on July 23, 2024, with the first trailer released on the same day. Preparation for the series began in December 2022, inspired by the ongoing Russo-Ukrainian War and the Chinese military exercises around Taiwan conducted in protest of Nancy Pelosi's 2022 Taiwanese state visit. Principal filming commenced in March 2024, with plans to finish by November 2024. The series is supported by the Taiwanese Ministry of Culture's "1 plus 4-T-content plan", and is produced by Zero Day Cultural and Creative Co., Ltd., with funding provided by the Taiwan Creative Content Agency, Chunghwa Telecom, Kaohsiung Film Fund, and Robert Tsao. Cheng Shin-mei (Chinese: 鄭心媚) is the producer and screenwriter of the show, while Lin Shih-ken (Chinese: 林仕肯) serves as executive producer. Filming was also assisted by the Republic of China Armed Forces, with a ROCN warship and real CM-32 armoured vehicles appearing in some scenes.

The show features ten episodes and ten directors in the first season. Producer Cheng Hsin-mei also wrote one of the episodes.

Director Lo Ging-zim explains that after the Russian invasion of Ukraine, he considers Taiwan to be "the most likely next flashpoint... drama is not presenting the truth but metaphor as to how we might react to the challenges in reality", and that Zero Day aims to show the public how to face a potential invasion. The director made the decision to weaken Taiwan's government and society in their portrayal, setting a worst-case scenario which they hope to empower the audience to avoid. Lo said “I believe every Taiwanese person has their own version of Zero Day attack in their mind. We were just the first to make it into a series.”

Hong Kong actor Chapman To, who plays the character of "Big John" (Brother Qiang), a Chinese Communist Party operative, expressed in a media interview that "it is embarrassing to play the role of a Hongkonger sent by the People's Republic of China to infiltrate Taiwan, but acting such a role is not difficult because there are many such people in Hong Kong".

== Release ==
The series consists of ten episodes, released at 9:00 PM on August 2, 2025, in Taiwan and August 15, 2025, in Japan, the 80th anniversary of the end of World War II. Each of the episodes will be filmed by different directors.

A 17-minute trailer was released in July 2024 during simulated air raids in Taiwan's Han Kuang Exercise.

== Episodes ==
No.	Title	Directed by	Written by	Original release date
1	"War or Peace"	Hung Po-hao	Cheng Hsin-mei	August 2, 2025
Taiwan elects a new president as China threatens invasion.
2	"Snake Boy"	Wu Zi-en	Cheng Hsin-mei, Wu Zi-en	August 9, 2025
A desperate young man is recruited by a violent fifth column.
3	"On Air"	Su I-hsuan	Su I-hsuan	August 16, 2025
A TV news presenter reveals pervasive Chinese tech surveillance and sabotage.
4	"Mind Fuck"	Diana Hsuan Chao	Ting Chi-wen	August 23, 2025
An online influencer is recruited by Horizon to support surrender to China.
5	"Miss"	Yi Liu	Cheng Hsin-mei, Meng Pai	August 30, 2025
A policeman helps an old girlfriend who has technology that both sides are pursuing.
6	"Money from Hell"	Cheng Hsin-mei	Cheng Wan-pi	September 6, 2025
A funeral shop owner organises a ceremony to protect Taiwan from invasion, while his wife wants him to join her in China.
7	"Vote for Pig"	Hung Po-hao	Cheng Hsin-mei, Huang Pen-jen	September 12, 2025
A politician bribes voters to win an election, and a goddess gives the corrupt ironic justice.
8	"The Separation of Anti-separation"	Lo Ging-zim	Cheng Hsin-mei	September 20, 2025
A businessman plans to move his family to Shanghai ahead of the invasion, but they choose allegiance to Taiwan.
9	"Breakout"	Lin Chih-ju	Cheng Hsin-mei, Lin Chih-ju	September 27, 2025
Big John organises a prison break and firefight to create chaos.
10	"Flame of Peace"	Akira	Cheng Hsin-mei	October 4, 2025
A major suspects a traitor in the high command as the PLA begins an assault on Dadan Island, where his brother is on the front line.

== Reactions ==
Zero Day Attack premiered at the 2025 Copenhagen Democracy Summit in May, where it received a standing ovation.

A review in Small Wars Journal said the series "perfectly illustrates the multifaceted nature of modern hybrid warfare... blend[ing] conventional military tactics with cyber operations, psychological manipulation, and exploitation of societal vulnerabilities". Writing in The Wall Street Journal, Walter Russell Mead said it "offers both an intimate look at Taiwanese society and an invaluable introduction to a looming great power conflict that could upend all our lives."

Nikkei Asia said Zero Day Attack was considered the first series in Taiwan to break the taboo within the country's entertainment industry of openly discussing a Chinese invasion of Taiwan. Yu-Hui Tai, a Taiwanese academic, said the show was part of a trend where the topic of a Chinese invasion had gone "from something we didn't want to talk about to something we can now imagine and even simulate."

Kuomintang politicians criticized the series for creating "an atmosphere of panic" and blurring "reality and fiction excessively." They also implied that the show was propaganda produced by the Democratic Progressive Party administration. Legislator Wang Hung-wei expressed concerns about the use of government subsidies to produce the drama. Cheng responded to allegations of improper funding by saying government subsidies were common for most local film and TV projects.

The Ministry of National Defense of the People's Republic of China criticized the show for stoking "war anxiety". The Institute for the Study of War said the ministry's comments served "ongoing PRC information operations to demoralize and isolate Taiwan diplomatically."

Chinese political commentator Luo Shanji compared the drama with CCTV's Silent Honor and worried both dramas will cause a further rift in cross-strait relations.

== See also ==
- 2045 (game)
- Conflict (Finnish TV series)
