= Bad Education =

Bad Education may refer to:

- Bad Education (TV series), a 2012 British comedy television series
  - The Bad Education Movie, a 2015 film based on the TV series
- Bad Education (2004 film), a Spanish film directed by Pedro Almodóvar
- Bad Education (2019 film), an American film starring Hugh Jackman and Allison Janney
- Bad Education (2022 film), a Taiwanese film directed by Kai Ko
- "Bad Education", a song by Tilly and the Wall
