= Berant Zhu =

Taiwanese actor (born 1999)

- 朱軒洋
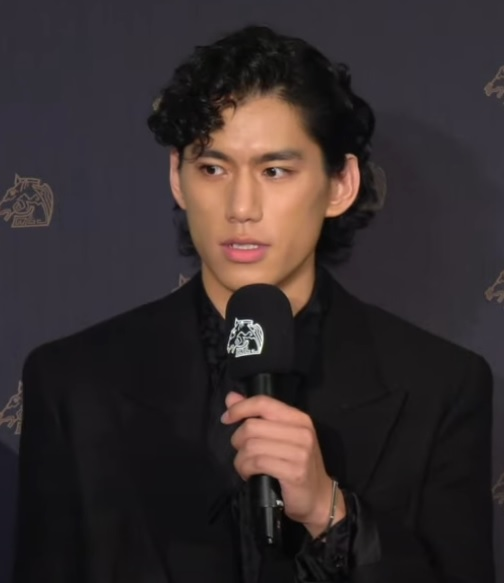
- Zhu in November 2022
- Born: Zhu Xuan-yang; 4 April 1999 (age 27); Taichung, Taiwan
- Education: Shih Chien University (BFA)
- Occupation: Actor
- Years active: 2018–present

Berant Zhu Xuan-yang (Chinese: 朱軒洋; born 4 April 1999) is a Taiwanese actor best known for his role as Chang in the crime mystery film Bad Education (2023), for which he won Best Supporting Actor in the 59th Golden Horse Awards.

== Early life and education ==
Zhu was born on 4 April 1999 in Taichung, Taiwan. He studied at Shin Min High School and took horticulture classes due to the influence of his father, who was interested in gardening. When he was in high school, a junior student recommended him to an artist agent who visited their school to look for talents. He was chosen and made his debut in a minor role in the 2018 romance film How to Train Our Dragon. He moved to Taipei alone at the age of eighteen to pursue studies at Shih Chien University, majoring in fashion design.

== Career ==
Zhu auditioned while studying in university and landed a lead role as Tung-hao, a high school basketball player competing with his half-brother on a rival team played by Fandy Fan, in the 2019 sports film We Are Champions. He received nominations for both Best Supporting Actor and Best New Talent in the 22nd Taipei Film Awards and began receiving film role offers after the release of the film. He then starred as Jim, a young husband searching for his wife when a virus that caused people to become cannibalistic broke out, in the 2021 horror film The Sadness. The same year, he was cast as Pi Tse, a tuxedo tailor, in the fantasy series The Magician on the Skywalk, and credited his performance as drawing inspiration from Tony Leung Chiu-wai's character in the 1990 film Days of Being Wild. He was nominated for Best Supporting Actor in a Television Series in the 56th Golden Bell Awards. Zhu was also cast as the co-leading actor in the crime thriller series Danger Zone later in the same year. He portrayed Ren Fei, a rookie police detective alongside Christopher Lee, who played his veteran supervisor. Zhu performed his own stunts in the series and earned a nomination for Best Male Lead in a Television Series in the 57th Golden Bell Awards the following year. Zhu suspended his university studies after the production of Danger Zone to focus on his acting career. He landed a main role as Lin Shan-jun in the 2022 medical drama Mad Doctor alongside Janel Tsai, and is set to reprise his role in the upcoming sequel.

In 2022, Zhu received his breakout role in the crime mystery film Bad Education as Chang, a high school graduate who becomes entangled with a gang boss alongside his two friends played by Kent Tsai and Edison Song. John Berra of Screen Daily noted that despite being a fresh-faced lead, Zhu acquitted himself well with his "ringleader" character traits, and lauded the collective strength of the trio's performance. Hai Nan, writing for The News Lens, praised Zhu's performance in the final scenes of the film, which maintained the momentum of the entire "bad education" narrative. Zhu won Best Supporting Actor in the 59th Golden Horse Awards and received a nomination for Best Actor in the 25th Taipei Film Awards for his role. In 2023, Zhu starred in the Netflix romance anthology series At The Moment alongside Gingle Wang as a pair of young bird lovers in a pandemic era. He is also set to star in a lead role alongside Kai Ko and Leon Dai in Giddens Ko's upcoming fantasy action film Kung Fu.

== Personal life ==
Zhu splits his time and work between Taipei and Taichung. Zhu began dating media personality Cindy He prior to his acting debut. On 28 March 2024, Zhu was spotted by paparazzi dating singer Julia Wu in Taipei while He was out of Taiwan for work. Zhu ended his five-year relationship with He before the news was publicly released in April.

== Filmography ==
=== Film ===
Year	Title	Role	Notes/Ref.
2018	How to Train Our Dragon	Wang Yun-yi (王雲逸)	
2019	We Are Champions	Chiang Tung-hao (姜桐豪)	
2021	The Sadness	Jim (廖俊喆)	
2022	Bad Education	Chang (張博偉)	
2024	Tales of Taipei	Ken (阿肯)	
2026	Kung Fu †	TBA	

=== Television ===
Year	Title	Role	Notes/Ref.
2021	The Magician on the Skywalk	Pi Tse (謝派恩)	Main role
2021	Danger Zone	Ren Fei (任非)	Main role
2022	Mad Doctor	Lin Shan-jun (林山君)	Main role
2023	At The Moment	Chang Yung (張永)	Main role

== Awards and nominations ==
Year	Award	Category	Work	Result	Ref.
2020	22nd Taipei Film Awards	Best Supporting Actor	We Are Champions	Nominated	
2020	22nd Taipei Film Awards	Best New Talent	We Are Champions	Nominated	
2021	56th Golden Bell Awards	Best Supporting Actor in a Television Series	The Magician on the Skywalk	Nominated	
2022	57th Golden Bell Awards	Best Male Lead in a Television Series	Danger Zone	Nominated	
2022	59th Golden Horse Awards	Best Supporting Actor	Bad Education	Won	
2023	25th Taipei Film Awards	Best Supporting Actor	Bad Education	Nominated	
2024	5th Taiwan Film Critics Society Awards	Best Actor	Bad Education	Nominated	
