= The Message (2009 film) =

- Official poster
- Directed by: Chen Kuo-fu; Gao Qunshu
- Written by: Chen Kuo-fu; Chang Chia-lu
- Based on: The Message by Mai Jia
- Produced by: Chen Kuo-fu; Feng Xiaogang; Zhang Dajun; Wang Tianyun
- Starring: Zhou Xun; Li Bingbing; Zhang Hanyu; Huang Xiaoming; Alec Su
- Cinematography: Jake Pollock
- Edited by: Yang Xiao
- Music by: Michiru Ōshima
- Production companies: Huayi Brothers; Shanghai Film Group
- Distributed by: Huayi Brothers
- Release date: 29 September 2009
- Running time: 118 minutes
- Country: China
- Languages: Mandarin; Japanese
- Budget: $7 million
- Box office: CN¥205.2 million

The Message (Chinese: 风声; pinyin: Fēngshēng; lit. 'The Sound of the Wind') is a 2009 Chinese espionage thriller film set in 1942 Nanking, featuring a cast including Zhou Xun, Li Bingbing, Huang Xiaoming, Zhang Hanyu and Alec Su. The film was adapted from Mai Jia's 2007 novel, The Message (Chinese: 风声; pinyin: Fēngshēng), and was co-directed by Chen Kuo-fu and Gao Qunshu.

The film had its international premiere at the 14th Busan International Film Festival, and was released in China on September 29, 2009.

== Plot ==
April 26, 1940, former Nationalist vice president Wang Jingwei made peace with Japan and set up a Japanese-supported regime during World War II, a puppet government in Nanking. Oct 10, during an anniversary ceremony of the government, a Wang government high official was assassinated, the last in a series of such attacks. Taketa, chief intelligence officer of the Japanese Imperial Army, believed that it was an action of an underground anti-Japan group and that there was a mole, nicknamed "the Phantom", inside the Wang government's Anti-Communist Command.

Determined to catch the mole, Taketa sends out a telegram with false information about an opportunity to assassinate a high-ranking officer. When it is apparent that the underground group knows its contents, he arrests the five personnel who saw the telegram, bringing them to the closely guarded fortress Qiu Castle for interrogation. They are:

- Anti-Communist squad captain Wu Zhiguo,
- Bai Xiaonian, an aide to the commander,
- chief telegraph decoder Li Ningyu,
- mailroom staff Gu Xiaomeng, and
- military intelligence director Jin Shenghuo

Taketa and Wang Government's intelligence chief Wang Tianxiang need to identify the Phantom in five days. After the suspects are tormented by constant interrogations, they began informing against each other for their own survival. Increasingly horrific physical tortures are used as the interrogators become impatient, while the tormented suspects come close to losing their sanity. A tense game of cat and mouse ensues as the Chinese agent attempts to send out a crucial message while protecting their own identity.

== Casting ==
=== Main cast ===
- Zhou Xun as Gu Xiaomeng
- Li Bingbing as Li Ningyu
- Zhang Hanyu as Wu Zhiguo
- Huang Xiaoming as Takeda (Wutian)
- Alec Su as Bai Xiaonian
- Wang Zhiwen as Wang Daoxiang
- Ying Da as Jin Shenghuo

=== Supporting cast ===
- Ai Dai
- Liu Jiajia
- Liu Weiwei
- Shi Zhaoqi
- Wu Gang as Liu'ye
- Zhu Xu
- Zhang Yibai
- Duan Yihong
- Ni Dahong

== Reception ==
=== Box office ===
The film earned CN¥205.195 million at the Chinese box office.

=== Critical response ===
The Message received generally positive reviews from critics, who praised its acting and production values, though some criticized its showy effects. Derek Elley of Variety called it "a classic potboiler mystery-thriller, as the suspects quarrel, scheme and are picked off one by one. ... [The] labyrinthine plot is both clever and highly unlikely, but realism is hardly the issue in what is basically an old-fashioned multistar vehicle in which the thesps strut their stuff." In a review for Screen Daily, Darcy Paquet wrote, "The two leading women [Zhou Xun] and [Li Bingbing] stand out in particular, with Zhou bringing her usual dynamism to the role of Ms. Gu and Li giving emotional depth to a more subdued performance. But across the board, the ensemble cast is solid."

The Hollywood Reporter's Maggie Lee disliked the film's "CGI overkill" and "ostentatious cinematography", as did Paquet, who wrote, "The end result is sometimes slightly over-exuberant, with swooping cameras and an overdone opening credits sequence, but never short of energy."

The film was nominated for a total of thirteen awards at the 46th Golden Horse Awards, 4th Asian Film Awards, 29th Hong Kong Film Awards, and 30th Hundred Flowers Awards. It won the award for best film at the 17th Beijing College Student Film Festival. Li Bingbing won the award for best leading actress at the Golden Horse Awards for her role as the code-breaker chief.
