= 52nd Golden Horse Awards =

2015 Taiwanese film awards ceremony

- Poster
- Date: 21 November 2015
- Site: Sun Yat-sen Memorial Hall, Taipei, Taiwan
- Hosted by: Mickey Huang; Lin Chi-ling
- Organized by: Taipei Golden Horse Film Festival Executive Committee

Highlights
- Best Feature Film: The Assassin
- Best Director: Hou Hsiao-hsien; The Assassin
- Best Actor: Feng Xiaogang; Mr. Six
- Best Actress: Karena Lam; Zinnia Flower
- Most awards: The Assassin (5)
- Most nominations: The Assassin (11)

Television in Taiwan
- Channel: Taiwan: TTV; Hong Kong: Star Chinese Movies; Mainland China: Sina Online; Malaysia: Astro AEC and Astro AEC HD; Singapore: E City

The 52nd Golden Horse Awards (Mandarin： 第52屆金馬獎) honored the best Chinese-language films and filmmakers of 2014–15 and took place on 21 November 2015 at Sun Yat-sen Memorial Hall in Taipei, Taiwan. The ceremony presented 23 categories of Golden Horse Awards and was televised in Taiwan by TTV. Mickey Huang and Lin Chi-ling were the hosts of the ceremony.

== Winners and nominees ==
Winners are listed first, highlighted in boldface.

**Best Feature Film**: **The Assassin**; Thanatos, Drunk; Port of Call; Tharlo; Mountains May Depart	**Best Documentary**: **The Chinese Mayor**; 32 and 4; On the Rim of the Sky; The Verse of Us; Wansei Back Home
**Best Animation Feature**: **McDull: Me & My Mum**; Monkey King: Hero Is Back	**Best Short Film**: **The Death of A Security Guard**; Under the Sun; No No Sleep; Filial Piety Award; Time to Die
**Best Director**: **Hou Hsiao-hsien — The Assassin**; Chang Tso-chi — Thanatos, Drunk; Tsui Hark — The Taking of Tiger Mountain; Pema Tseden — Tharlo; Jia Zhangke — Mountains May Depart	**Best Leading Actor**: **Feng Xiaogang — Mr. Six**; Lee Hong-chi — Thanatos, Drunk; Aaron Kwok — Port of Call; Deng Chao — The Dead End; Dong Zijian — De Lan
**Best Leading Actress**: **Karena Lam — Zinnia Flower**; Sylvia Chang — Office; Vivian Sung — Our Times; Shu Qi — The Assassin; Zhao Tao — Mountains May Depart	**Best Supporting Actor**: **Michael Ning — Port of Call**; Cheng Jen-shuo — Thanatos, Drunk; Lawrence Ko — Murmur of the Hearts; Michael Chang — The Laundryman; Wang Qianyuan — Saving Mr. Wu
**Best Supporting Actress**: **Lü Hsueh-feng — Thanatos, Drunk**; Elaine Jin — Port of Call; Ma Sichun — The Left Ear; Jian Man-shu — Maverick; Jiang Wenli — The Final Master	**Best New Director**: **Bi Gan — Kaili Blues**; Alec Su — The Left Ear; Lee Chung — The Laundryman; Xiang Guoqiang — Young Love Lost; Frankie Chen — Our Times
**Best New Performer**: **Lee Hong-chi — Thanatos, Drunk**; Jessie Li — Port of Call; Michael Ning — Port of Call; Cecilia So — She Remembers, He Forgets; Ado' Kaliting Pacidal — Panay	**Best Original Screenplay**: **Jia Zhangke — Mountains May Depart**; Chang Tso-chi — Thanatos, Drunk; Tom Lin Shu-yu and Liu Wei-jan — Zinnia Flower; Philip Yung — Port of Call; Guan Hu and Dong Runnian — Mr. Six
**Best Adapted Screenplay**: **Pema Tseden — Tharlo**; Sylvia Chang — Office; Acheng, Chu T’ien-wen and Hsieh Hai-meng — The Assassin; Xu Haofeng — The Final Master; Cheng Yu-chieh and Lekal Sumi Cilangasan — Panay	**Best Cinematography**: **Mark Lee Ping Bin — The Assassin**; Hsu Chih-chun and Chang Chih-teng — Thanatos, Drunk; Christopher Doyle — Port of Call; Yu Lik-wai — Mountains May Depart; Lu Songye — Tharlo
**Best Visual Effects**: **Kim Wook — The Taking of Tiger Mountain**; Victor Wong and Bryan Cheung — Rise of the Legend; Guo Jianquan and Christian Rajaud — Wolf Totem; Jason Snell, Ellen Poon and Tang Bingbing — Monster Hunt; Rick Sander and Christoph Zollinger — Gone with the Bullets	**Best Art Direction**: **William Chang and Alfred Yau — Office**; Yohei Taneda and Lee Kin-wai — Monster Hunt; Yi Zhenzhou — The Taking of Tiger Mountain; Hwarng Wern-ying — The Assassin; Liu Qing — Gone with the Bullets
**Best Makeup & Costume Design**: **Hwarng Wern-ying — The Assassin**; Yee Chung-man — Monster Hunt; William Chang and Lui Fung-shan — Office; William Chang — Gone with the Bullets; Zhai Tao and Chen Yuye — De Lan	**Best Action Choreography**: **Xu Haofeng — The Final Master**; Corey Yuen — Rise of the Legend; Li Chung-chi — SPL II: A Time for Consequences; Yuen Bun — The Taking of Tiger Mountain; Liu Mingzhe — The Assassin
**Best Original Film Score**: **Lin Shangde and Tseng Yun-fang — Thanatos, Drunk**; Kung Yu-chi — Zinnia Flower; Chen Yang — Murmur of the Hearts; Lim Giong — The Assassin; Yoshihiro Hanno — Mountains May Depart	**Best Original Film Song**: **"Aka Pisawad" — Panay**; Composer： Suming; Lyrics: Suming; Performer： Suming; "Darkness on the Sea" — Port of Call; Composer： Ding Ke; Lyrics： Ding Ke; Performer： Ding Ke; "Twist" — The Laundryman; Composer： Luantan Ascent; Lyrics： Luantan Ascent; Performer： Luantan Ascent; "He Bi Ne" — Office; Composer： Lo Ta-yu; Lyrics： Lin Xi; Performer: Eason Chan; "A Little Happiness" — Our Times; Composer： JerryC; Lyrics： Hsu Shi-chen and Wu Hui-fu; Performer： Hebe Tien
**Best Film Editing**: **Chang Tso-chi — Thanatos, Drunk**; Zhong Renbo — The Verse of Us; Chen Po-wen — Murmur of the Hearts; Ding Sheng — Saving Mr. Wu; Liao Ching-sung — The Assassin	**Best Sound Effects**: **Tu Duu-chih, Chu Shih-yi and Wu Shu-yao — The Assassin**; Kuo Li-chi — The Laundryman; Kinson Tsang, George Lee and Yiu Chun-hin — Monster Hunt; Tu Duu-chih, Wu Shu-yao and David Richardson — Office; Zhang Yang — Mountains May Depart
**Outstanding Taiwanese Filmmaker of the Year**: **Hou Hsiao-hsien**	**Audience Choice Award**: **Mountains May Depart**
**FIPRESCI Prize**: **Kaili Blues**	**Piaget Award**: **Mr. Six**
**Lifetime Achievement Award**: **Li Li-hua**
