= Reversed Front =

Game developed by ESC Taiwan

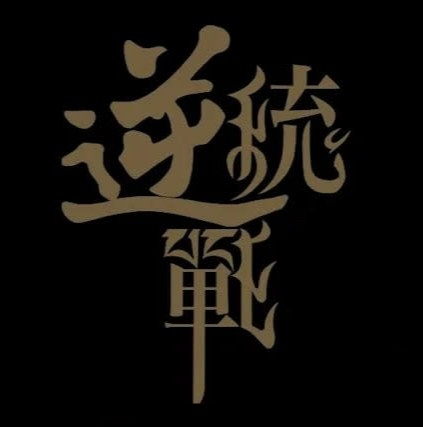
- Genres: Board game
- Players: 1－4（can extend to 9 when using two boxes of games）
- Playing time: 80 minutes
- Age range: 15+
- Skills: Negotiation; Resource management; Strategy

Reversed Front
- Traditional Chinese: 逆統戰：致地與海的革命者
- Simplified Chinese: 逆统战：致地与海的革命者
Transcriptions
Standard Mandarin
- Hanyu Pinyin: Nìtǒngzhàn: Zhì Dì Yǔ Hǎi Dè Gémìngzhě
- Bopomofo: ㄋㄧˋ ㄊㄨㄥˇ ㄓㄢˋ ：ㄓˋ ㄉㄧˋ ㄩˇ ㄏㄞˇ ㄉㄧˋ ㄍㄜˊ ㄇㄧㄥˋ ㄓㄜˇ

Reversed Front: Bonfire
- Traditional Chinese: 逆統戰：烽火
Transcriptions
Standard Mandarin
- Hanyu Pinyin: Nìtǒngzhàn: Fēnghuǒ
- Bopomofo: ㄋㄧˋ ㄊㄨㄥˇ ㄓㄢˋ ：ㄈㄥ ㄏㄨㄛˇ

Reversed Front: Dear Revolutionaries (Chinese: 逆統戰：致地與海的革命者) is a board game created by ESC Taiwan (Chinese: 臺灣境外戰略溝通工作小組) in 2020. The game involves roleplaying as different underground factions in East Asia opposed to the rise of the People's Liberation Army.

A mobile version of the game, Reversed Front: Bonfire (Chinese: 逆統戰：烽火) was launched in April 2025. On 5 June of the same year, it was banned in Hong Kong for violating the territory's national security law.

More than NT$20 million was raised during the board game’s initial crowdfunding stage, sparking interest from the gaming community.

== In-game factions ==
Box Cover art of Reversed Front

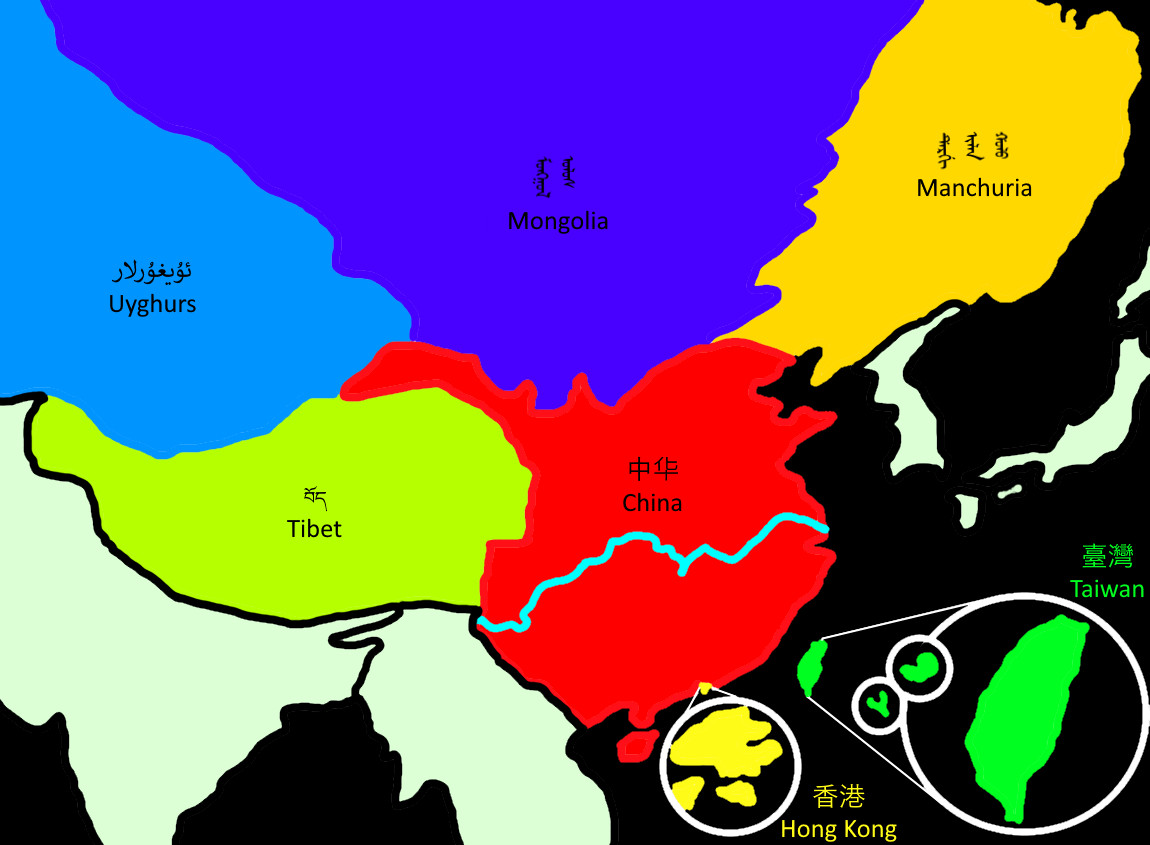
The official release of the standard positions of different powers. The green and yellow ones on the bottom-right (southeast) corner are Taiwan and Hong Kong respectively.

In the game, players can roleplay different factions in the East Asia region.

Available authority	Source position of initiation	Specialty
Red Force	Beijing	Strongest in strength and capability. With special power to distract others in game, but is surrounded from all directions, hence requires careful planning of power distribution.
Taiwan	Taipei	With abundant resources and ability in terms of supporting others. However, internal conflict is severe especially with regards to appeasing China. The Red Force can exploit this vulnerability to attack Taiwan from the inside.
Hong Kong	Victoria	Good at forming organizations, finding external assistance, and spreading information. Can migrate authority to places like Taiwan, United Kingdom, the United States, etc.
Tibet	Dharamsala / Dehradun / Chushul	Maintains close relations with India and receives substantial Indian support. Has two strategic options: the Central Tibetan Administration, which cannot use force but excels in propaganda; or groups like Four Rivers and Six Ranges and the Special Frontier Force, which rely on Indian backing and are more militant, able to confront the Red Army.
Uyghurs	Istanbul/Almaty/Munich/Washington, D.C.	Skilled at using military strength to destroy enemy operations, but less capable of establishing organized movements within the Great Firewall (i.e., inside China).
Manchuria	Tokyo/San Francisco/Vladivostok	Enjoys greater freedom, with the option of collaborating with various foreign allies (East Asia, Anglo-American powers, or Europe), allowing for diverse strategies.
Kazakhs	Almaty	Representing both Eastern and Western Turkic Kazakhs, they possess a unique victory condition—the "Three Districts Revolution." Their potential for development is stronger outside the firewall, with more flexible tactics.
Mongolia	Ulanbaatar/Tokyo/New York City	Backed by Russia and in direct confrontation with the Red Army. Excels in stronghold warfare, particularly in blocking enemy actions during territorial conflicts.
Anti-CCP Dissidents	Based in various Chinese cities depending on the faction	A vast array of groups including reformists, republicans, federalists, neo-leftists, Falun Gong, democracy activists, gender revolutionaries, underground churches, as well as regionalist movements from areas like Wan, Wu-Yue, and Bashu, and ethnic groups like Hui and Miao. Though confined in hostile territory and with limited mobility, they can share networks and mutually support each other with Taiwanese and Hong Kong organizations.

Players roleplaying as Taiwan can decide on multiple routes for global diplomatic development:

- Green Route (named after the Pan-Green Coalition): Support Taiwanization, assist Chinese provinces in gaining independence, assist multiple anti-communism initiatives, and export party-external movement experiences.
- Blue Route (named after the Pan-Blue Coalition): "Free China", reviving overseas anti-communist organizations supported by the Republic of China in the early past and supporting anti-communism in China and all over the world.

=== Global Superpowers ===
- Northern Commonwealth: Composed of Mongolia, other Turkic entities and Russia. Relatively good at infiltrating organisations and espionage.
- Anglosphere Commonwealth: The Commonwealth of Nations and the United States. At the center of the global economy, offering funding opportunities.
- Japanese Monarchy and Korean Confederation: Japan and South Korea, wealthy in cultural development and strength and can assist others in developing underground bodies.
- Nusantarian League: Vietnam, Philippines, and other Southeast Asia nations. Located at the hub of transportation, it gives the players a bonus in terms of operation efficiency.
- India: India, Bhutan and Nepal. Heavily populated, strong in terms of power and is skilled at restraining the enemy.
- Tianfang (alternate name for Western Regions): A group of Islamic countries, stretching from Pakistan and Afghanistan to the Arab world and Turkey. Can offer military assistance and disrupting enemy operations.
- Europe: European countries such as Germany and France. The birthplace of democracy and an intellectual hub. Can help to spread ideals and ideologies.

== Related developments ==
- Steam game: The PC version's servicing page has been uploaded onto Steam, though the content is still under development.
- Mobile game: It was declared on November 9, 2022, that the mobile game version had entered the internal testing phase. Later, the start of pre-registration was announced. Official external testing was initiated on January 26, 2025 with official release being scheduled for April 5 of the same year. During this period, the official website received eight DDoS attacks from People's Republic of China. On April 5, the day of release, the game experienced another series of DDoS attacks, with the game server being flooded and blocked from service causing the release to be suspended once more.

== Reception ==
Chinese state media outlet Global Times ran an article criticizing the game for supporting the Taiwanese and Hong Kong independence movements, citing this as a potential threat to the healthy development of teenagers as well as China's one country, two systems principle. ESC Taiwan published a Facebook post in response, sarcastically congratulating their supporters for having successfully forced Chinese state media to rebuke the game. Commenters replied with remarks such as "a nation of 1.4 billion threatened by a board game" and "thankful to the free advertisements of Global Times". It was later reported that the game had been sold for some 1000 RMB a piece in the Chinese black market.

On 5 June 2025, Hong Kong invoked its national security law against Reversed Front: Bonfire, making it the first mobile game to be banned by the law. Authorities told residents who had downloaded the app to uninstall it immediately, but when asked refused to provide more detail. The ban led to international media coverage and boosted the popularity of the game due to the Streisand effect, as shortly after the ban, the game became the most searched term on Google among Hong Kong inhabitants.

== See also ==
- 2045 (game)
