= Thanatos, Drunk =

- Theatrical release poster
- Directed by: Chang Tso-chi
- Written by: Chang Tso-chi
- Produced by: Kao Wen-hung
- Starring: Lee Hong-chi; Cheng Jen-shuo; Huang Shang-ho
- Cinematography: Hsu Chih-chun; Chang Chi-teng
- Edited by: Chang Tso-chi
- Music by: Lin Shang-te; Tseng Yun-fang
- Production companies: Simple View Production; Chang Tso-chi Film Studio
- Distributed by: Swallow Wings Films
- Release dates: 10 February 2015 (Berlin); 7 August 2015 (Taiwan)
- Running time: 107 minutes
- Country: Taiwan
- Languages: Taiwanese; Mandarin

Thanatos, Drunk (Chinese: 醉.生夢死; pinyin: Zuì Shēng Mèng Sǐ) is a 2015 Taiwanese drama film directed by Chang Tso-chi. It was screened in the Panorama section of the 65th Berlin International Film Festival.

== Plot ==
Rat and his elder gay brother Shanghe live in an old house on the fringe of Taipei City. Rat works at a market vegetable stall and goes out with a mute woman who gets up to all sorts of craziness. Shanghe works for an entertainment company and dances in a gay nightclub. He is attracted to his cousin's boyfriend, Shuo, who is a gigolo. Shuo gets beaten up by his ex-client's brother, Ah Xiang, and his men at the behest of his sister. Ah Xiang, out for revenge because of a scar left by Rat, uses Rat's mute girlfriend to catch him. When alone with Ah Xiang, he attacks and stabs him suddenly with a hooked knife that he keeps around in his sling bag. Back at his home after escaping from Ah Xiang, he remembers the incident when he found his decomposing mother's corpse on the floor of her home. The movie ends with a silhouette of him hugging his mother at the river bank.

== Cast ==
- Lee Hong-chi as Rat
- Cheng Jen-shuo as Shuo
- Huang Shang-ho as Shanghe
- Lü Hsueh-feng as Mother
- Wang Ching-tingas Da-xiong
- Chang Ning as The Mute
- Lin Chin-yu as Ah Xiang
- Andrew Chen
- Chin Tzu-yen as Zi-yan

== Accolades ==
Award/Ceremony	Category	Recipients	Result
10th Asian Film Awards	Best Supporting Actor	Cheng Jen-shuo	Nominated
10th Asian Film Awards	Best Newcomer	Lee Hong-chi	Nominated
65th Berlin International Film Festival	ELSE - The Siegessäule Readers' Jury Award	Thanatos, Drunk	Won
16th Chinese Film Media Awards	Best Supporting Actress	Lu Hsueh-feng	Won
17th Taipei Film Awards	Grand Prize	Thanatos, Drunk	Won
17th Taipei Film Awards	Best Narrative Feature	Thanatos, Drunk	Won
17th Taipei Film Awards	Best Actor	Lee Hong-chi	Won
17th Taipei Film Awards	Best Supporting Actor	Cheng Jen-shuo	Won
17th Taipei Film Awards	Best Supporting Actress	Lu Hsueh-feng	Won
17th Taipei Film Awards	Press Award	Thanatos, Drunk	Won
52nd Golden Horse Film Awards	Best Feature Film	Thanatos, Drunk	Nominated
52nd Golden Horse Film Awards	Best Director	Chang Tso-chi	Nominated
52nd Golden Horse Film Awards	Best Leading Actor	Lee Hong-chi	Nominated
52nd Golden Horse Film Awards	Best Supporting Actor	Cheng Jen-shuo	Nominated
52nd Golden Horse Film Awards	Best Supporting Actress	Lu Hsueh-feng	Won
52nd Golden Horse Film Awards	Best New Performer	Lee Hong-chi	Won
52nd Golden Horse Film Awards	Best Original Screenplay	Chang Tso-chi	Nominated
52nd Golden Horse Film Awards	Best Cinematography	Chang Chih-teng, Hsu Chih-chun	Nominated
52nd Golden Horse Film Awards	Best Music	Lin Shang-te, Tseng Yun-fang	Won
52nd Golden Horse Film Awards	Best Film Editing	Chang Tso-chi	Won
16th Tokyo Filmex	Grand Prize	Thanatos, Drunk	Nominated
37th Three Continents Festival	Golden Montgolfiere	Thanatos, Drunk	Nominated
Youth Film Handbook	Top 10 Films	Thanatos, Drunk	Won
