= 2045 (game) =

Board game

2045 is a board game produced by Taiwanese company Mizo Games which centers on a military confrontation between Taiwan and China in the year 2045.

== History ==
In August 2024 Mizo Games started a crowdfunding campaign eventually raising ~US$120,000. This was 4,000% more than their initial crowdfunding goal.

== Gameplay ==
The game is set in the year 2045 and has a cyberpunk theme. Gameplay takes place over a ten-day period. The AFP calls the game a "zero-sum contest of military strategy." Players can choose characters representing different factions such as soldier, collaborator, and arms dealer.

== Reception ==
The game was controversial in Taiwan where popular depictions of a potential military conflict with China have been taboo. Mizu Game's founder KJ Chang said "We can't predict the future, but if a conflict is unavoidable I hope this game gives people a chance to experience war on the tabletop before it reaches us."

== See also ==
- Cross-strait relations
- Geostrategy in Taiwan
- Reversed Front
- Zero Day (Taiwanese TV series)
