= John Paisley (actor) =

Scottish actor

- Born: 1938 (age 87–88); Scotland
- Died: 25 December 2023 (aged 85)
- Occupation: Actor
- Years active: 1959 - 2012
- Spouse: Zheng Keying

John Paisley (born 1938) was a Scottish actor, drama teacher, director and writer.

== Early life and acting career ==
Paisley was born in Scotland in 1938. He graduated from Edinburgh College of Speech and Drama, followed by the Royal Scottish Academy of Music and Drama in 1959. He initially worked as an actor and stage manager as part of a repertory in England. He emigrated to Australia in 1961, working as an actor, teacher, writer, and playwright. in Melbourne he appeared as Sir J. M. Barrie in the acclaimed production of "The Death of Peter Pan", (Seasons 1 & 2). He relocated to China to lecture at the Beijing University Department of Foreign Languages from 1999 to 2005, before returning to film work in Chinese productions. He married the painter Zheng Keying, his third wife, in 2005.

His most significant recent role was as John Rabe in the 2009 movie City of Life and Death.

Paisley died peacefully at a nursing home on Christmas Day in 2023 and is survived by his wife and a daughter from an earlier marriage.

== Filmography ==
=== Film ===
Year	Title	Role	Notes
2006	Fearless	English Businessman	
2008	Last Hour	Monk's father	
2009	Empire of Silver	Dr. Wilson	
2009	City of Life and Death	John Rabe	
2009	Gasp	American	
2012	CZ12	Sir Charlton	

=== Television ===
Year	Film	Role	Notes
1968	Contrabandits	Mate	1 episode
1970	Skippy	Rix	1 episode
1994	A Country Practice	Turps	1 episode
1994	Janus	Provis	1 episode
1995	Blue Heelers	Bill Dwyer	1 episode

=== Screenplays ===
Year	Film	Format	Notes
1989	Die Didi-Show	TV series	10 episodes
1998	Durch dick & dünn	TV movie	
2006	Felix 2 - Der Hase und die verflixte Zeitmaschine	TV movie	
