= The Conformist (2017 film) =

2017 film

- Film poster
- Directed by: Cai Shangjun
- Written by: Gu Xiaobai
- Produced by: Cai Shangjun; Li Xudong; Li Xing
- Starring: Huang Bo; Song Jia
- Cinematography: Yu Lik-wai
- Edited by: Kong Jinlei
- Release dates: 23 June 2017 (Shanghai IFF); 11 September 2017 (China)
- Running time: 126 minutes
- Country: China
- Language: Mandarin

The Conformist (冰之下) is 2017 Chinese drama film directed by Cai Shangjun. It was screened in the Special Presentations section at the 2017 Toronto International Film Festival.

== Cast ==
- Huang Bo as Wang Haibo
- Song Jia as Bing Bing

== Awards and nominations ==
Awards	Category	Recipient	Result	Ref.
54th Golden Horse Awards	Best Leading Actor	Huang Bo	Nominated	
54th Golden Horse Awards	Best Sound Effects	Wen Bo	Nominated	
