= Aka Pisawad =

2015 song by Suming

"不要放棄"

Song by Suming

from the album Wawa No Cidal Movie Soundtrack
- English title: Aka Pisawad
- Length: 5:07
- Songwriter: Suming

"Aka Pisawad" (Mandarin: 不要放棄) is a song written and sung by Suming, an Amis singer, and is the theme song of the 2015 Taiwanese film Wawa No Cidal. The song won the Best Original Song for a Movie at the 52nd Golden Horse Awards in 2015, and the Best Song of the Year award at the 27th Golden Melody Awards in 2016, marking the first time a song in its native language has won the Best Song of the Year award at the Golden Melody Awards.

== Background ==
=== Conceptualization ===
Wawa No Cidal was co-written and directed by Zheng Youjie (鄭有傑) and Lekal Sumi, and Suming was invited to compose the title song. The title of the song "Aka Pisawad" is Suming's commentary on the entire movie, and is the centerpiece of the film, which depicts the story of the East Coast's virgin rice fields encountering tourism development.

=== Song Versions ===
In addition to the Amis version, there is also a Mandarin version of this song, both of which are included in the Wawa No Cidal Movie Soundtrack, with piano accompaniment.

== Awards ==
- Suming performed this song at the 52nd Golden Horse Awards.

Year	Award	Finalist	Result
2015	Best Original Song for a Movie Aka Pisawad	Aka Pisawad	Won

- The 27th Golden Melody Awards, the first time an Aboriginal song has won the Golden Melody Award for Best Song of the Year.

Year	Award	Finalist	Result
2016	Best Song of the Year	Aka Pisawad	Won
