= Symbol (film) =

- Film poster
- Directed by: Hitoshi Matsumoto
- Written by: Hitoshi Matsumoto; Mitsuyoshi Takasu
- Produced by: Akihiko Okamoto
- Starring: Hitoshi Matsumoto; David Quintero; Luis Accinelli; Lilian Tapia; Adriana Fricke; Carlos C. Torres
- Cinematography: Yasuyuki Tōyama
- Edited by: Yoshitaka Honda
- Music by: Yasuaki Shimizu
- Production companies: Yoshimoto Kogyo; Phantom Film; AOI Promotion
- Distributed by: Shochiku
- Release date: September 12, 2009 (Japan)
- Running time: 93 minutes
- Country: Japan
- Languages: Japanese; Spanish; English; Russian

Symbol (Japanese: しんぼる, Hepburn: Shinboru) is a 2009 Japanese surrealist comedy film directed by and starring Hitoshi Matsumoto. It was nominated for the Asian Film Awards in the categories of Best Actor and Best Visual Effects, and has not received an official U.S. release.

The film was greeted negatively by Japanese audiences; however, it received a surprisingly warmer reaction in the West, despite not being commercialized outside Japan.

== Plot ==
The film contains two major story lines. The first takes place in Mexico and centers around a masked wrestler called Escargot Man and his family as they prepare for a match that night. His family worries about him since the luchador is growing older and his slated opponent is stronger and younger than him. Nevertheless, his son and father are excited to see the match. These portions of the film are realistic, with dialogue in Spanish.

In the second, more surreal storyline, a Japanese man wakes up in an empty white room with no apparent ceiling from which he struggles to escape. Both story lines eventually indirectly converge.

== Cast ==
- Hitoshi Matsumoto as the Man
- David Quintero as Escargot Man / Antonio's Father
- Luis Accinelli as Antonio's Uncle
- Lilian Tapia as Antonio's Mother
- Adriana Fricke as Karen
- Carlos C. Torres as Antonio
- Ivana Wong as Antonio's Sister
- Arkangel De La Muerte as Aguila De Plata
- Matcho Panpu as Tequila Joe
- Dick Togo as El Super Demonio
- Salam Diagne as African Tribesman

== Production ==
Matsumoto not only wrote the script and directed the film, he also stars as the man trapped in the white room. Being that large parts of the narrative are based on non-verbal communication and set in a singular space, Symbol is comparable to films like Aragami (Ryuhei Kitamura) and the Cube film series.
