= Panay (film) =

- Film poster
- 太陽的孩子
- Directed by: Cheng Yu-chieh; Lekal Sumi
- Written by: Cheng Yu-chieh; Lekal Sumi
- Produced by: Cheng Yu-chieh
- Starring: Ado' Kaliting Pacidal; Dongi Kacaw; Rahic Gulas; Kaco Lekal; Bokeh Kosang
- Cinematography: Liao Ching-yao
- Edited by: Liu Yue-xing
- Music by: Suming
- Production company: Filmosa Production
- Release date: 25 September 2015
- Running time: 99 minutes
- Country: Taiwan
- Language: Mandarin

Panay (Amis: Wawa No Cidal; Chinese: 太陽的孩子) is a 2015 feature film directed by Taiwanese director Cheng Yu-chieh and Lekal Sumi Cilangasan. It is inspired by a true story.

"Panay" is a very common female name among the Taiwanese Indigenous tribe, it simply stands for the beautiful spike of rice.

This is one of the few Taiwanese movies that was filmed from an indigenous perspective, through the cross-ethnic cooperation between two directors, Cheng Yu-chieh (Han) and Lekal Sumi (Pangcah). The actors were mostly inexperienced; critics found their performances to be fresh yet persuasive. The film was awarded the Audience Choice Award from the Taipei Film Festival. Panay's theme song "Aka Pisawad" won the Best Original Film Song of the 52nd Golden Horse Awards.

== Plot ==
Panay worked in the city as a journalist. One day, she found her tribe has been overdeveloped and changed by tourism. They were losing their land and their culture, so she decided to return home to bring back the abandon terrace. In the process, she found it's not only about the land, but also about who she really is.

== Cast ==
Ado' Kaliting Pacidal	as Panay
Yi-Fan Hsu (credited as Bokeh Kosang)	as Liu Sheng-Hsiung
Kaco Lekal	as Grandfather
Dongi Kacaw	as Nakaw
Rahic Gulas	as Sera

== Productions ==
Production Credits

Cheng Yu-chieh, Lekal Sumi Cilangsan	: directors	Suming	: music / music supervisor
Cheng Yu-chieh, Lekal Sumi Cilangsan	: screenplay writers	Wu Jo-yun, Lai Hsiang-kuei	: production designers
Liao Ching-yao	: camera (colour, widescreen, HD)	Dongi Sawmah Ciwidian	: costume designer
Liu Yue-xing	: editor	Tu Duu-chih	: sound (dolby 5.1)

== Reception ==
Three general comments from three media about the movie are as follow:

This heartfelt drama illuminates many of the complex issues faced by Taiwan's Aboriginal communities.

— Taipei Times,

The story of a Taipei news reporter who returns to her indigenous village and joins a campaign to stop outsiders taking farmland for development is nothing new, but its setting is idyllic and the acting naturalistic.

— South China Morning Post,

and

This saccharine, prettily shot family drama is destined for further festival play.

— Variety,

and the movie also received a number of accolades.

== Awards ==
Award/Ceremony	Category	Name	Outcome
2015 Taipei Film Festival	Audience Choice Award	Panay	Won
5th Social Justice Awards	Social Justice Award	Panay	Won
52nd Golden Horse Awards	Best Original Film Song	"Aka Pisawad" by Suming	Won
52nd Golden Horse Awards	Best Adapted Screenplay	Cheng Yu-chieh, Lekal Sumi	Nominated
52nd Golden Horse Awards	Best New Performer	Ado' Kaliting Pacidal	Nominated
46th ICFT-UNESCO	Fellini Award	Panay	Nominated
2016 Taiwan international children's Film Festival	Taiwan Award	Panay	Nominated
8th CMS Int'l Children's Film Festival	Best children's Feature Film award	Panay	Won
27th Golden Melody Awards	Song of the Year	"Aka pisawad" by Suming	Won

Festival	Accolades	Outcome
The 26th Singapore International Film Festival	Singapore International Film Festival opening film	Selected
Chinese Visual Festival (London, UK)	London Chinese Video Festival closing film	Jury Grand Prize
Tenth Taiwan Vancouver Film Festival		Selected
