= Fall of Ming =

2013 film

- Film poster
- Directed by: Wang Jing (王竞)
- Written by: Xiaodong Xie
- Starring: Yuanzheng Feng; Leon Dai; Bo Feng
- Release date: October 25, 2013
- Running time: 110 minutes
- Country: China
- Language: Chinese

Fall of Ming (Chinese: 大明劫; pinyin: Dà Míng Jié) is a 2013 Chinese historical drama film directed by Wang Jing (王竞).

== Plot ==
In 1642, after almost three hundred years of existence, the Ming dynasty is on the verge of collapse. Li Zicheng's rebel-forces have already surrounded Kaifeng, the capital of Henan province, but their attack on the city has been temporarily repelled. The politically persecuted Marshal Sun Chuanting (Leon Dai) is released from prison and ordered by Chongzhen Emperor (Yu Shaoqun) to defeat the rebels with only 5,000 troops. Arriving in Tongguan with his wife (Feng Bo) and child, he is greeted by the corrupt garrison-commander He Renlong, who does not know that Sun has come to execute him and his men for their dereliction of duty. Meanwhile, the itinerant physician Wu Youke (Feng Yuanzheng) is put on trial for allegedly poisoning a patient with his unconventional treatments. The case is dismissed but the magistrate forbids him from practicing within that jurisdiction. Wu decides to visit his former teacher in Tongguan, but is forced by Ming troops to attend to the wounds of Li Tianyou (Sun Qiang), a disillusioned scholar who contemplated joining the rebellion. He then stays with his former teacher, the master-physician Zhao Chuan (Qian Xuege), who is told to treat the Ming soldiers when more and more of them mysteriously start falling ill, but Master Zhao is unable to stop the spread of the epidemic among the soldiers and later dies of the plague himself. When all the other physicians flee in fear, an understanding develops between Wu and the Field Marshal Sun, who allows Wu to test out his unconventional medical theories of airborne disease. Wu isolates the sick in dedicated camps and orders everyone in contact to cover their face, and manages to contain the plague for the moment. The rebels hear of the success and attempt to kidnap Wu to treat their troops, but Field Marshal Sun's troops rescue him.

Meanwhile, Field Marshal Sun finds that Tongguan's grain supplies are seriously low and the grain bags are filled with sand instead, so he angrily executes the registrar for covering up the fact. The local garrison is poorly trained, and the firearm equipments are malfunctional due to lack of maintenance. The besieged Ming troops in Kaifeng are now starving, and the Ming court is sending urgent orders telling Sun to attack the rebels. Sun however is having great trouble procuring rations and funds from the local gentries, who selfishly refuse to contribute anything for the army. When Sun attempts to confiscate public lands stolen from the local garrison by the gentries, they bribe his deputy Ren Qi (Hu Xiaoguang) to burn down the government archive storing the evidence. In fury and desperation, Sun summarily executes all the gentries in a surprise move and seized their assets by force.

Under pressure from the emperor, the Field Marshal sets out to engage the rebels. The night before he leaves, he arranges for the isolation camp to be burned and kills all within, so that the sick will not hinder his campaign. Disillusioned with the government, Wu Youke leaves with Master Zhao's widowed daughter and grandson and goes back to his hometown in Suzhou. He then spends the rest of his life compiling his knowledge and experiences treating the plague into the book On Plague Diseases, the theory of which regarding infectious diseases is two centuries ahead of its time.

With an under-prepared army, Field Marshal Sun is defeated and killed in the subsequent battle outside Tongguan. After his death, Li Zicheng's forces successfully invades Guanzhong and establishes the short-lived Shun dynasty at Xi'an, and the Ming dynasty collapses two years later.

== Cast ==
- Yuanzheng Feng
- Leon Dai
- Bo Feng
- Yang Yang
- Xuege Qian
