= Mulan (2009 film) =

2009 Chinese film directed by Jingle Ma

Mulan: Rise of a Warrior
- Official poster
- Directed by: Jingle Ma
- Screenplay by: Zhang Ting
- Produced by: Jingle Ma; Wang Tian-yun; Jeffrey Chan; Ni Ying; Li Li
- Starring: Zhao Wei; Yu Rongguang; Chen Kun; Hu Jun; Jaycee Chan; Nicky Lee; Vitas
- Cinematography: Tony Cheung
- Edited by: Kwong Chi-leung
- Music by: Lee Shih Shiong; Lee Wei Song; Yi Jiayang; Cheung Ah-tung; Tan Dun; Xiao Ke
- Production companies: Starlight International; Media Group; Beijing Galloping Horse; Film & TV Production; Hunan TV & Broadcast Intermediary Co., Ltd. Shanghai Film Group; PKU Starlight Group; Beijing Polybona Film Publishing Co., Ltd.
- Release dates: 26 November 2009 (Malaysia); 27 November 2009 (China)
- Running time: 114 minutes
- Country: China
- Language: Mandarin
- Budget: $6.75 million
- Box office: $304 million

Mulan: Rise of a Warrior (simplified Chinese: 花木兰; traditional Chinese: 花木蘭; pinyin: Huā Mùlán), also known as Mulan: Legendary Warrior, is a 2009 Chinese action war film starring Zhao Wei as the titular protagonist. The director, Jingle Ma, explained that the film is vastly different from the 1998 Walt Disney animated film and stated, "Zhao Wei's appearance is closer to that in my imagination". Zhao Wei was cast by Ma as Hua Mulan over previously considered actresses Zhang Ziyi, Michelle Yeoh, and Liu Yifei, the latter of whom would later play the titular character in Disney's remake of the 1998 animated film. (Note: Yifei would portray the character in the 2020 live-action remake of the 1998 animated film.)

== Plot ==
In 450 A.D., the ruling Chinese Wei Dynasty is under constant threat from the Rouran tribes. The Chinese army conducts a nationwide draft. A retired soldier named Hua Hu insists on enlisting again to serve his country. Mulan (Zhao Wei), his young daughter, is quite intelligent and skilled in various martial arts, but because she is a woman, she cannot enlist. Mulan tricks her father, steals his armor and weapon, disguises herself as a man and enters the Wei army in her father's place.

Through rigorous military training, Mulan demonstrates courage, resourcefulness, and determination, frequently helping her fellow soldiers confront their aggressors. Her abilities attract the attention of Wentai (Chen Kun), the battalion’s deputy commander. The two subsequently develop a friendship and a mutual affection for one another.

One night, when Wentai is taking a bath in a hot spring, he accidentally runs into Mulan. After a brief skirmish, Mulan escapes without exposing her identity. However, Wentai becomes determined to uncover the woman hiding among the troops. To make things worse, the army bully loses a jade pendant and a strip-search is ordered. Terrified to reveal herself as a woman and tarnish her father's reputation, Mulan admits that she committed the theft. The battalion commander orders Mulan to be executed the following day.

In prison, she tells Wentai the truth and he promises to keep her secret until the very end. When the Rouran launch a surprise attack, Wentai releases Mulan from jail and tells her to escape, but Mulan stays behind to fight. Her life is spared and she is promoted to sub-commander, with Wentai promoted to battalion commander after the previous commander was killed in the battle.

The two fight alongside each other, earning several great victories and are promoted to generals, but lose friends and comrades along the way. During one encounter with Rouran forces, a messenger tells Mulan that Wentai and his unit have been ambushed while scouting, but he has ordered her to stay behind and guard the supply wagons. Mulan, concerned for her Wentai's safety, rides out to reinforce him, leaving some men behind to watch the supplies. The two return to find the other part of their troops ambushed, resulting in many deaths and part of their supplies burned. Wentai admonishes Mulan for allowing her emotions to cloud her judgment.

Later, in another battle with Rouran forces, Wentai is seriously injured, but survives. He instructs Mulan's childhood friend, Tiger, to tell her he died and to give her his name tag, wanting to teach her a lesson on the importance of letting go of her emotional ties to become a more capable leader. Mulan becomes depressed and despondent, and starts drinking heavily. She stops giving orders and training her soldiers, leading to a breakdown in discipline and morale. Frustrated by her selfishness, Tiger angrily confronts her, and tells her the soldiers still need her. A remorseful Mulan affirms her commitment to being a better leader to her men. Wentai, having recovered from his injuries, rejoins the battalion in disguise. Mulan continues leading campaigns against the Rouran for several years, scoring many victories for the Wei.

Unhappy that the Rouran tribes have not joined forces to create a powerful army to fight against the Wei forces, the greedy Prince Mendu murders his own father to seize the throne for himself. He coerces the other Rouran leaders to join forces and continue the fight against the Wei.

Battling against the combined forces of the Rouran under Mendu, Mulan's troops then fight strongly against the Rourans despite being outnumbered, but many, including Mulan, are injured in a volley of arrows. Suddenly, a huge dust storm known as the Poison Dragon appears, and everyone on the battlefield is consumed by it. When they regain consciousness, Mulan is reunited with Wentai and she orders a retreat back into a closed canyon. Mendu wants to see how Mulan copes without any provisions and sets up a siege at the entrance of the canyon.

Without access to food or water, many of Mulan's soldiers perish in the canyon. Mulan herself becomes sick and weak, but is kept alive by Wentai, who gives her his own blood to drink when the provisions of water run out.

When Mulan realizes that the Commander-in-Chief - jealous of her success - isn't bringing his troops and has left them to die, she prepares her troops to fight to the death for their country. Wentai goes to the front line and announces he is the 7th Prince of Wei, and offers to be taken prisoner in return for Mulan and her soldiers' freedom. Mendu takes him as prisoner and delivers provisions and medical supplies to Mulan and her troops.

When she regains her strength, Mulan orders her officers to lead the battalion home while she infiltrates the Rouran camp, wearing the clothing of a Rouran woman, to save Wentai. Talking to the Rouran princess, she shows the princess that she is also a woman, and tells the princess she would help her fulfill her dream of stopping the war and making peace. Mulan saves Wentai with the help of the princess and returns to the Wei capital, where she at last sheds her disguise and reveals herself as a woman. The Emperor wants to make Mulan the new commander-in-chief and grants her a pardon for breaking the law stating women are not allowed to enlist, but Mulan asks to only return to her village to take care of her ill father after twelve long years of war. The Emperor agrees to her request, and announces the engagement of the Rouran Princess and Wentai to bring peace to the two empires. Mulan returns home and is reunited with her father.

Back in Mulan's hometown, Wentai visits her to ask her to runaway with him, but Mulan chooses the country of China over their feelings for each other. He respects her decision, and the two share a long passionate embrace, reaffirming their love for one another, before Wentai departs.

== Cast ==
- Zhao Wei as Hua Mulan, a young woman determined to keep her family safe and ready to take her father's place in protecting China.
  - Xu Jiao as young Hua Mulan
- Chen Kun as Wentai
- Hu Jun as Mendu
- Jaycee Chan as Fei Xiaohu
- Nicky Lee as Hu Kui
- Liu Yuxin as the Rouran princess
- Yu Rongguang as Hua Hu
- Vitas as Gude
- Sun Zhou as the Wei emperor

This was the second collaboration between Beijing Film Academy classmates Zhao Wei and Chen Kun after Painted Skin.

== Reception ==
On the film's opening day Beijing Screen, the Chinese government recognized Mulan: In 2011, Mulan earned the 9th Henan province governmental award - movie category of Achieving Five Top Project Prize

=== Home media ===
In the United Kingdom, it was 2020's third-best-selling foreign language film on physical home video formats (below Parasite and Weathering with You).

== Theme song ==
The end theme song performed by Stefanie Sun, "Mulan Qing" (木蘭情; "Mulan Love") was composed by Lee Shih Shiong with lyrics by Kevin Yi. It was nominated for Best Original Song at the 29th Hong Kong Film Awards. Vitas covered it in English as "Beneath the Glory".

An insert song, "Mulan Xing" (木蘭星; "Mulan Star"), was performed by Jane Zhang.

== Awards ==
Awards
Award	Category	Name	Result
10th Changchun Film Festival	Best Actress	Zhao Wei	Won
21st Golden Melody Awards	Best Producer for a Single Melody	Li Shih Song, Yee Kar Yeung	Nominated
29th Hong Kong Film Awards	Best Actress	Zhao Wei	Nominated
29th Hong Kong Film Awards	Best Original Film Song	Li Shih Song, Yee Kar Yeung and Stefanie Sun	Nominated
30th Hundred Flowers Awards	Best Picture		Won-Runner Up
30th Hundred Flowers Awards	Best Actress	Zhao Wei	Won
30th Hundred Flowers Awards	Best Supporting Actor	Jaycee Chan	Nominated
19th Shanghai Film Critics Awards	Best Actress	Zhao Wei	Won
Vietnam DAN Movie Awards	Favorite Chinese Movie		Won
Vietnam DAN Movie Awards	Favorite Chinese Actress	Zhao Wei	Won

== See also ==
- Hua Mulan
- Mulan (2020 film)
