= Love Is a Gun (2023 film) =

2023 Taiwanese-Hong Kong film by Lee Hong-chi

- Directed by: Lee Hong-chi
- Screenplay by: Lee Hong-chi; Cheng-Hsun Lin
- Starring: Lee Hong-chi; Patricia Lin
- Cinematography: Ying-Rong Zhu
- Edited by: Yanan Qin
- Music by: Bruce Su
- Release date: 2023
- Countries: Taiwan; Hong Kong
- Language: Mandarin Chinese

Love Is a Gun (Chinese: 愛是一把槍, "Ai shi yi ba qiang") is a 2023 crime drama film co-written and directed by Lee Hong-chi in his directorial debut. A Taiwanese-Hong Kong co-production, the film premiered at the 80th edition of the Venice Film Festival, in the Venice International Critics' Week sidebar, where it was awarded the Lion of the Future Award for a Debut Film.

== Cast ==
- Lee Hong-chi as Sweet Potato
- Patricia Lin as Seven
- Qing-Yu Zheng
- Edison Song
