= Jake Pollock =

American cinematographer

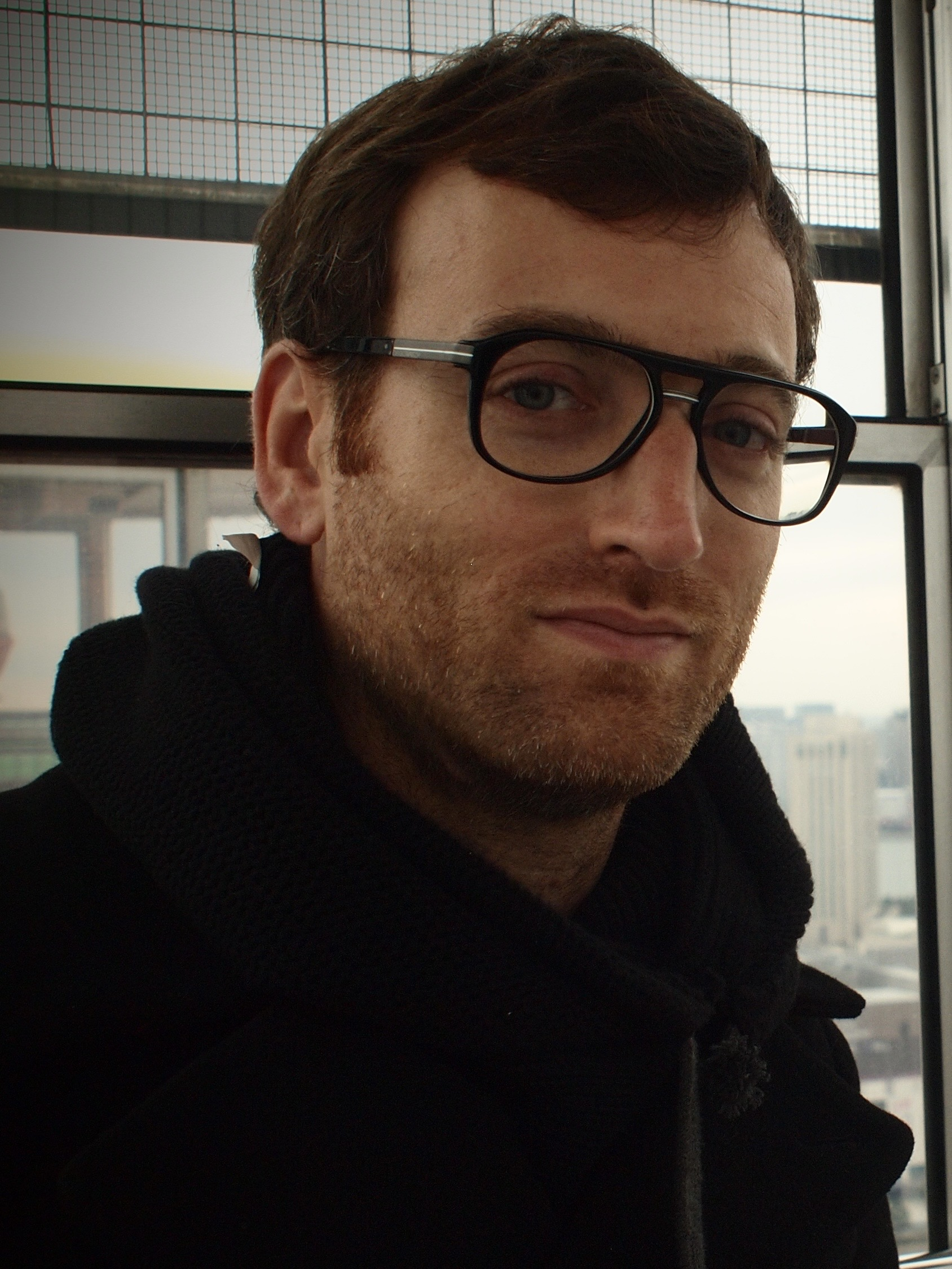
- Occupation: Cinematographer
- Years active: 2005–present (cinematographer)

Chinese name
- Traditional Chinese: 包軒鳴
- Simplified Chinese: 包轩鸣
Transcriptions

Jake Pollock (simplified Chinese: 包轩鸣; traditional Chinese: 包軒鳴) is an American cinematographer based in Taiwan, whose work covers feature films, short films, commercials and music videos. He has collaborated with internationally acclaimed directors such as Wong Kar Wai, Peter Chan, Lou Ye, and Derek Tsang.

In 1993, he studied Film Production at New York University Tisch School of the Arts, and at the same time entered the New York independent film circle to work. Because of his love for Asian culture, he settled in Taiwan in 2002. He is proficient in Chinese and English, and his understanding of Asian and Western cultures has created his unique photography aesthetics.

== Awards ==
Jake Pollock's Award achievements include Best Cinematography Award at the 31st Hong Kong Film Awards and the 6th Asian Film Awards for Dragon; the 22nd Shanghai International Film Festival Golden Goblet Award for Best Cinematography for Spring Tide; Best Cinematography Award at the 55th Asia-Pacific Film Festival for Starry Starry Night. In addition, he was awarded the Special Jury Award at the 8th Taipei Film Awards for his cinematography on three very different films Do Over, The Pain of Others, and Respire. He has multiple nominations at the Hong Kong Film Awards and Golden Horse Awards with films such as The Shadow Play, Soul Mate, and Girlfriend, Boyfriend. Monga and Yang Yang were both nominated for Best Cinematography at the Asian Film Awards.

== Filmography ==
=== Feature films ===
Year	Title	Director	Awards and nominations	Category	Result	Ref.
1998	Whatever Happened to Kathy	Chris Cain				
2006	Do Over	Cheng Yu-Chieh	Taipei Film Awards	Special Jury Award	Won	
2007	Amour-Legende	Mi-sen Wu				
2007	The Wall-Passer	Hung Hung				
2009	Yang Yang	Cheng Yu-Chieh	Asian Film Awards	Best Cinematography	Nominated	
2009	The Message	Chen Kuo-fu; Gao Qunshu				
2010	Pinoy Sunday	Ho Wi-ding				
2010	Monga	Doze Niu	Asian Film Awards	Best Cinematography	Nominated	
2010	Monga	Doze Niu	Asia Pacific Screen Award	Best Cinematography	Nominated	
2011	Starry Starry Night	Tom Lin Shu-yu	Asia-Pacific Film Festival	Best Cinematography	Won	
2011	Dragon	Peter Chan	Hong Kong Film Awards	Best Cinematography	Won	
2011	Dragon	Peter Chan	Asian Film Awards	Best Cinematography	Won	
2011	Dragon	Peter Chan	Asia Pacific Screen Award	Best Cinematography	Nominated	
2012	Girlfriend, Boyfriend	Yang Ya-che	Golden Horse Film Awards	Best Cinematography	Nominated	
2014	The Truth About Beauty	Aubrey Lam				
2014	Second Chance	Yann Kung				
2014	Women Who Flirt	Pang Ho-cheung				
2015	Mojin: The Lost Legend	Wuershan				
2016	Soul Mate	Derek Tsang	Hong Kong Film Awards	Best Cinematography	Nominated	
2017	Goldbuster	Sandra Ng				
2019	Integrity	Alan Mak				
2019	The Shadow Play	Lou Ye	Golden Horse Film Awards	Best Cinematography	Nominated	
2019	Spring Tide	Tian-yi Yang	Shanghai International Film FestivalGolden Goblet Awards	Best Cinematography	Won	
2019	Remain Silent	Zhou Ke				
2021	Schemes in Antiques	Derek Kwok	Macau International Movie Festival	Best Cinematography	Nominated	
2022	Mama Boy	Arvin Chen				
2023	Eye of the Storm	Chun-Yang Lin	Taipei Film Awards	Best Cinematography	Nominated	
2023	Eye of the Storm	Chun-Yang Lin	Golden Horse Film Awards	Best Cinematography	Nominated	
2023	Love in Taipei	Arvin Chen				
2023	Hello Ghost	Pei-Ju Hsieh				
2024	She's Got No Name	Peter Chan				

=== Short films ===
Year	Title	Director	Awards and nominations	Category	Result	Ref.
1998	The Census Taker	Aaron Cohen				
1998	Still	Ho Wi-ding				
2000	Landscape	Nick Regalbuto				
2005	Respire	Ho Wi-ding	Taipei Film Awards	Special Jury Award	Won	
2005	The Pain of Others	Tom Lin Shu-yu	Taipei Film Awards	Special Jury Award	Won	
2008	Summer Afternoon	Ho Wi-ding				
2008	Viva la Diva	Mi-sen Wu				
2009	Taipei 24H：Save the Lover	程孝澤				
2011	10+10：100	Ho Wi-ding				
2011	10+10：The Debut	Chen Kuo-fu				
2012	When Yesterday Comes： I Wake Up In A Strange Bed	Ho Wi-ding				

=== Other works ===
Year	Title	Director	Awards and nominations	Category	Result	Note	Ref.
2008	No Practice Love Song	Yang Ya-che	Golden Bell Awards	Best Cinematography	Won	TV Movie	
2009	Tibet‧Taipei	Mi-sen Wu				Documentary	
2018	A Documentary on the Shadow Play	Yingli Ma				Performance	
2019	SAINT LAURENT - SELF 05	Wong Kar-wai、Wing Shya				TVC	
2021	Sony Alpha You are Alpha	孔玟燕				TVC	
2023	Jay Chou X Beneunder 2023	孔玟燕				TVC	
