= Geostrategy in Taiwan =

Geostrategy in Taiwan refers to the foreign relations of Taiwan in the context of the geography of Taiwan. Taiwan is an island country in East Asia, while it is also located at the center of the first island chain and commands the busy traffic of Taiwan Strait and Bashi Channel.

== History ==
In 1683 the Qing dynasty's Kangxi Emperor commented on the strategic value of Taiwan, saying "Taiwan is nothing but a tiny island. The empire earns nothing with it and loses nothing without it."

After the Sino-French War of 1884–1885, the Qing dynasty started to notice the strategic importance of Taiwan. After the First Sino-Japanese War of 1894–1895, the Qing dynasty yielded the sovereignty of Taiwan to Japan by Treaty of Shimonoseki, which is opposed by Russian, French and German, who also have interests in taking over Taiwan island, but in vain. Taiwan has gone from a natural barrier of Qing dynasty to Japan's bridgehead of expansion after Japan acquiring Ryukyu Islands.

In the scope of a larger geostrategic picture, Taiwan is also located in the rimland of the East Asia inner sea, the so-called Asiatic Mediterranean, which is described by Nicholas John Spykman's book, The Geography of the Peace (1944), as Formosa. Spykman provided the insight that it is the rimland that the real struggle for mastery has taken place since the great naval battle in Asia-Pacific ocean during World War II happened largely in the inner sea. Halford John Mackinder also modified his earlier Heartland Theory and published an article The round world and the winning of the peace in 1943 Foreign Affairs to emphasize the importance of rimlands and marginal seas.

The Third Taiwan Strait Crisis in 1996 and the 1997 Asian financial crisis show that the safety, security and stability of Taiwan does affect the steadiness of the East Asia region.

In terms of its geostrategic importance Randall Schriver called Taiwan “today’s Indo-Pacific Fulda Gap.” However, its importance has been questioned by other American scholars.

== Values ==
After political transition from one party authoritarian to modern democracy, there are now multiple parties participating in competitive campaigns in local and national elections in Taiwan, including but not limited to municipal mayors and the president of Taiwan. The economy of Taiwan is highly dependent on foreign trade utilizing the sea lane.

=== International Environmental Partnership ===
In April 2014, the International Environmental Partnership was founded in Taipei, Taiwan by Environmental Protection Administration Taiwan, with founding partner from U.S. Environmental Protection Agency to address the following environmental challenges:

- expanding mercury monitoring
- air quality protection
- managing electronic waste
- establish eco-campus school partnership between U.S. and Taiwan
- support Global Environmental Education Partnership

=== Global Cooperation and Training Framework ===
The Global Cooperation and Training Framework is initiated by the American Institute in Taiwan and the Taiwan Council for U.S. Affairs for broader U.S.-Taiwan cooperation, which allow Taiwan to engage in the Asia Pacific region and the world with the United States. The GCTF cooperation address issues on international humanitarian assistance, public health, environmental protection, energy, technology, education and regional development.

The Framework is a milestone for Taiwan to transform from an international aid recipient to an aid provider.

==== Technology ====
American Institute in Taiwan cohost with Japan to open GCTF on Network Security and emerging technologies, which is a multilateral platform for Taiwan to cooperate with Japan, Chile, Mexico, Federal Communications Commission and United States Department of Homeland Security experts and law enforcements, including endorsing the Prague Proposal of 5G network security.

==== Democracy ====
American Institute in Taiwan cohost with Taiwan Foundation for Democracy to open GCTF on Defending Democracy through Media Literacy. National Security Strategy (United States) describes a geopolitical competition between free and repressive visions of governance is being played out in Taiwan and United States. There are foreign actors using social media to interfere elections in United States. Taiwan is also on the frontlines to marshal academic, policy, and technical resources to confront external pressures.

Second GCTF on media literacy discuss the implementation of media literacy education in curriculums and how governments and private enterprises can cooperate to combat disinformation, among other challenges.

== Challenges ==
Modern China's attitude towards Taiwan also reflects the need for China to compete with the United States in terms of security. To People's Liberation Army Navy's naval planners the control of Taiwan has strategic value as a gateway to the Pacific Ocean. Analysts point out that control over Taiwan and its deeper eastern waters would provide China's ballistic missile submarines with less detectable access to the wider Pacific where they would serve as an important component of a credible second strike capability.

According to Yuan-kang Wang Taiwan should synchronize security interests with the United States in current context, including President Obama's Asia rebalancing strategy and President Trump's "free and open Indo-Pacific" strategy. The minimum defense requirement for Taiwan is to withstand the first wave of PRC attack before the U.S. assistance. It is also critical for Taiwan to build a consensus on how to deal with China.

== See also ==
- 2045 (game)
- Geostrategy
- Geostrategy in Central Asia
- Cross-Strait relations
- Island Chain Strategy
- New Southbound Policy
- United States foreign policy toward the People's Republic of China
