= Zeng Yan =

- Born: Chinese: 曾檐, English: Kykko Zeng; July 28, 1985 (age 40); Sichuan, China
- Origin: Chengdu/Sichuan, China
- Genres: Neofolk, electronica, ambient, new-age
- Occupation(s): Singer-songwriter, composer
- Instrument: Vocals
- Years active: 2010–present
- Labels: Pacific Music
- Website: http://blog.sina.com.cn/u/1706475904

Zeng Yan (Chinese: 曾檐; born July 28, 1985), is a Chinese neo-folk musician from Chengdu, Sichuan. So far, she has released 3 studio albums and one soundtrack LP. She is known for her whisperish vocals and for her experimental folk sound.

== Discography ==
=== Studio albums ===
- 2010: I Am Singing A Dream
- 2011: One
- 2023: Wake

=== Mini albums ===
- 2012: Vie

=== Soundtrack album ===
- 2011: Great Wall My Love Original Soundtrack

=== Singles ===
- 2009: "Song For Home Pray For Soul"
