= Yang Yang (film) =

- Film poster
- Directed by: Cheng Yu-chieh
- Written by: Cheng Yu-chieh
- Produced by: Khan Lee
- Starring: Sandrine Pinna; Chang Ruei-Jia; Huang Chien-Wei; Her Sy-Huoy; Chu Lu-Hao; Yu Tai-Yan
- Cinematography: Jake Pollock
- Edited by: Cheng Yu-chieh
- Music by: Lim Giong
- Production company: A Khan Entertainment
- Distributed by: Zeus International Production; A Khan Entertainment
- Release date: 7 August 2009 (Taiwan)
- Running time: 111
- Country: Taiwan
- Language: Mandarin
- Box office: NT$1.66 million

Yang-Yang is a 2009 Taiwanese drama film directed by Cheng Yu-chieh. It is the director’s second feature film, and also the first film in Ang Lee and Khan Lee's Tui Shou Ji Hua (Pushing Hands Project, 推手計畫). The film stars Sandrine Pinna, Chang Ruei-Jia, and Huang Chien-Wei to tell the story of a Taiwanese-French biracial girl Yang-Yang, who struggles to balance the image of a nice girl expected of her in the society and her true self longing for love.

== Plot ==
Yang-Yang, a Taiwanese-French biracial girl, has never seen his French biological father, nor can she speak French. Her high school life was disrupted when her mom decided to marry her track and field team coach for she has to adjust to living in a new family with her coach, and her teammate, Xiao-Ru, who is the coach’s daughter. The ambiguous relationship Yang-Yang has with Xiao Ru’s boyfriend has turned the two into rivals not only on the track but also in real life. Out of jealousy, Xiao-Ru plots against Yang-Yang to disqualify her for competition, which forces her to leave her home. She turned to show-biz with the help from Ming-Ren, who graduated from the same school and was now a talent manager. Yang Yang’s biracial appearance gave her an advantage in her career, but at the same time she was constantly forced to play the role of a French, which she has distasted since she was little. From an athlete to a movie star, challenges and frustrations in Yang-Yang’s life never stop causing her pains. Could she always present herself as a sunny girl as her Chinese name implies? The eternal question of “Who am I?” to her is both a philosophical question and a literal one as a biracial and a female in Taiwan’s conservative society.

== Cast ==
Actor	Role
Sandrine Pinna (Chang Jung-Jung)	Yang-Yang
Chang Ruei-Jia	Shawn/Huang Shao-An
Huang Chien-Wei	Ming-Ren
Her Sy-Huoy	Xiao-Ru
Chu Lu-Hao	Coach Chen /Xiao Ru’s father
Yu Tai-Yan	Yang-Yang’s mother

== Production ==
Yang-Yang (2009) is the second feature film of Cheng Yu-chieh after Do Over (1995). The film was subsidized by the Bureau of Audiovisual and Music Industry Development (BAMID) for NT$ 8 million, nominated for the Pusan Promotion Plan (PPP) by Busan International Film Festival, and also had the director, Ang Lee, as its consultant. The film is also the first feature film in Ang Lee and Khan Lee's Tui Shou Ji Hua (Pushing Hands Project, 推手計畫).

The film took two and a half years for its production due to its lack of sufficient budget. Even with the NT$ 8 million subsidy from BAMID and other fundings, it was still difficult for the film to find investment due to the 2008 financial crisis. The film was eventually made with the producer Khan Lee throwing in his own money to make up for the shortage.

The script had been rewritten almost entirely by Cheng Yu-chieh, who would like the film to be as realistic as possible. He removed all the scenes he considered too dramatic. He had also mentioned that Yang-Yang was a film about characters rather than plot, and that it was against the usual 3-act structure.

The shooting of Yang-Yang is the second collaboration between director Cheng Yu-chieh and actress Chang Jung-Jung’s after Cheng’s first feature film, Do Over. Since the character Yang-Yang and actress Chang Jung-Jung are both Taiwanese-French mixed race, the film is assumed by many to be based on Chang’s personal story; however, the director emphasizes that the only similarity the two have is their ethnicity. Zhen and Chang had known each other for a long time before the production of the film and Chang actually participated in the process of writing the script. According to Zheng their friendship had enabled him to trust her very much on the set. Because of her involvement in the scriptwriting, Chang has mentioned in the interview that she empathized with the character very deeply during shooting, and even shed tears for her character Yang-Yang.

In order to break free from her stereotypical role as the sweet girl next door Chang Jung-Jung received physical training for the film in order to portray the athletic character. Chang Jung-Jung won Best Actress in the 11th Taipei Film Festival for her leading role in Yang-Yang.

The cinematography of the film, especially the frequent uses of hand-held shots and long takes is often pointed out as a distinguished stylistic feature of the film.

Before releasing the film, director Cheng Yu-chieh cooperated with the Taiwanese photographer, Kuo Cheng-Chang, to publish the movie book of Yang-Yang. The book is a collection of the director's thoughts throughout the making of Yang-Yang and includes stills from the film.

== Awards and nominations ==
- 59th Berlin International Film Festival, Panorama
- 33th Hong Kong International Film Festival (HKIFF)
- 11th Taipei Film Festival opening film
- 2009, Taipei Film Awards: winner of Special Jury Prize, Best Actress (Chang Jung-Jung), Best Film Score(Lim Giong), and the first prize of International Young Director Competition(國際青年導演競賽)
- Locarno International Film Festival
- Vancouver International Film Festival (VIFF)
- Ghent International Film Festival
- Tokyo International Film Festival
- Busan International Film Festival
- San Diego Asian Film Festival
- Hawaii International Film Festival
- Torino International Film Festival
- 2010 Asian Film Awards – nominated for Best Actress and Best Cinematographer
- 46th Taipei Golden Horse Film Festival: nomination for Best Leading Actress (Chang Jung-Jung), nomination for Best Supporting Actor (Huang Chien-Wei), nomination for Best New Performer (Her Sy-Huoy)、Best Original Film Score (Lim Giong)、Best Sound Effects (Tu Du-Chih)、Outstanding Taiwanese Film of the Year; winner of Prix FIPRESCI
- Pan-Asia Film Festival, closing film

== Music/soundtrack ==
- Tanya Chua, If You See Him (蔡健雅《若你碰到他》)
