= Akira Chen =

Taiwanese actor and film director

- 陳文彬
- Born: 10 March 1969 (age 56); Taiwan

Akira Chen (Chinese: 陳文彬; pinyin: Chén Wénbīn; Pe̍h-ōe-jī: Tân Bûn-pin; born 10 March 1969) is a Taiwanese actor and film director.

== Career ==
Chen was commissioned by Shei-Pa National Park to direct a film about the Atayal people and culture. The work became Msgamil: Once Upon a Time, also known as A Thousand Years of Atayal, and premiered in 2008. Chen first feature film, Everlasting Moments, was released in 2011, and portrayed the Amis and the Atayal.

Chen was first credited as an actor in Leon Dai's 2009 film Cannot Live Without You. Chen's leading role as Li Wu-hsiung won him the Taipei Film Award for best actor. Chen has also appeared on stage, in The Waste Land (2010), and Taipei Singer (2011).

Chen contested the 2016 legislative elections as a member of the Democratic Progressive Party from Changhua County's first district, losing to Kuomintang incumbent Wang Huei-mei. Chen was subsequently appointed to lead the Changhua County Cultural Affairs Bureau.
