= Cow (2009 film) =

- Film poster
- Directed by: Guan Hu
- Written by: Guan Hu
- Story by: Zhao Dongling
- Starring: Huang Bo; Yan Ni
- Cinematography: Song Xiaofei
- Edited by: Kong Jinlei
- Music by: Li Ke
- Distributed by: United Star Corp.
- Release dates: 10 September 2009 (Venice); 11 September 2009 (China)
- Running time: 93 minutes
- Country: China
- Languages: Mandarin (Shandong dialect); Japanese

Cow (simplified Chinese: 斗牛; traditional Chinese: 鬥牛; pinyin: Dòu Niú; lit. 'Fighting for the cow') is a 2009 Chinese film directed by Guan Hu. A black comedy, Cow takes place during the Second Sino-Japanese War. A villager, played by Huang Bo, has been entrusted to care for a Dutch cow when a Japanese attack leaves him and the cow the only survivors.

The film premiered at the 66th Venice International Film Festival as part of its "Horizons" program.

== Plot ==
The film takes its story from oral traditions of Shandong. A bumbling villager, Niu'er (Huang Bo), is charged with caring for a Dutch cow, considered an object of awe to the village given its larger size and ability to produce large amounts of milk, they forced Niu'er to take care of the cow, when the village head and members of 8th Route Army members that holds out the village before retreating. When the village is bombed by the Japanese, Niu'er flees from his home, only to return to devastation and a mass grave, containing all villagers killed by a Japanese unit, including Niu'er's love, Jiu. The cow, however, has survived, and the two make their way across the landscape, although they return to the village, just holding on, avoiding Japanese troops, hungry survivors and mountain bandits before eventually meeting with the Communist 8th Route Army.

A group of soldiers meet first some Japanese wounded, unaware that there is a survivor of the village. Niu'er is almost killed by the squad leader by bayonet until some 8th Route Army soldiers attack the village, killing the holdouts, except one and some Chinese soldiers. The soldiers depart, leaving the Japanese corpses and Niu'er's body covered in uniform. Some time later, they Niu'er and the cow meet some refugees, and Niu'er gives the villagers some milk, resulting in the cow being over-milked and becoming sick. Some refugees want to kill the cow by any means possible, dying due to the landmines and tripwire that are left by Japanese troops. He enters a tunnel, when he spots a surviving soldier. He is prepared to kill the soldier until he sees the Japanese soldier trying to heal the cow's inflammation by massaging the udder. While on a pass, they see some 8th Route Army and Japanese corpses and meet a wounded Kuomintang soldier. When a Nationalist soldier finds the Japanese soldier, he shoots him, wounding Niu'er and killing both of them. He buried both of them in a grave. Upon returning to the village, he was thrown on a well, and forcing the cow to mate a Chinese cow. He later exits the well, prepared to die in a final stand, holding a bomb, while the village is in chaos, bandits fighting somebody. The cow uses itself as cover while the firefight intensifies. Flashbacks occur, including Jiu singing while wearing his bracelet and taking it to her dead body while covering her with sand. After the fight forced to make the cow stand up, while sobbing. He decided to leave village for good, having only the cow, the document, some seeds and the payment money. He travels the area, settling at a mountain for 7 years until he was found by People's Liberation Army troops leaving the area. The commander refuses to take the cow. The commander took his fingerprint on the document. He also made words "in memory of Niu'er" in a paper.

== Cast ==
- Huang Bo - Niu'Er
- Yan Ni - Jiu
- Liu Jie
- Tenma Shibuya
- Gao Hu
- Shang Tie Long
- Hu Xiao Guang

== Reception ==
The film was well received by English-language critics during its screening in Venice. Derek Elley of Variety for example, felt the film was strong enough to deserve a competitive spot in the festival and extolled both the film's aesthetic and its lead performer in Huang. The Shanghai-based City Weekend also praised the film, noting that as a return to film after five years in television, Guan Hu's Cow "couldn’t have turned out better." Notably, several critics favorably compared the film to Jiang Wen's similarly themed black comedy, Devils on the Doorstep.

The reception in Asia was similarly positive. Given its small budget, the film's release in China was a strong 7.7 million RMB box office for the opening weekend, particularly in light of the film's competition, the highly publicized The Founding of a Republic. Cow was also nominated in seven categories for Taiwan's 46th Golden Horse Film Awards, including Best Director. The film would go on to win Best Actor for Huang Bo and Best Adapted Screenplay for Guan Hu.

== Style ==
Despite its seemingly simple story, Guan Hu's presentation of Cow has been described as both "hyper-realistic and surreal" and "magical-realist" by critics, particularly in its use of a non-linear narrative structure. The film also uses personal point of view, like making the character hold a small hidden camera while taking in some scenes.
