= Feng Yuanzheng =

Chinese actor

- 冯远征
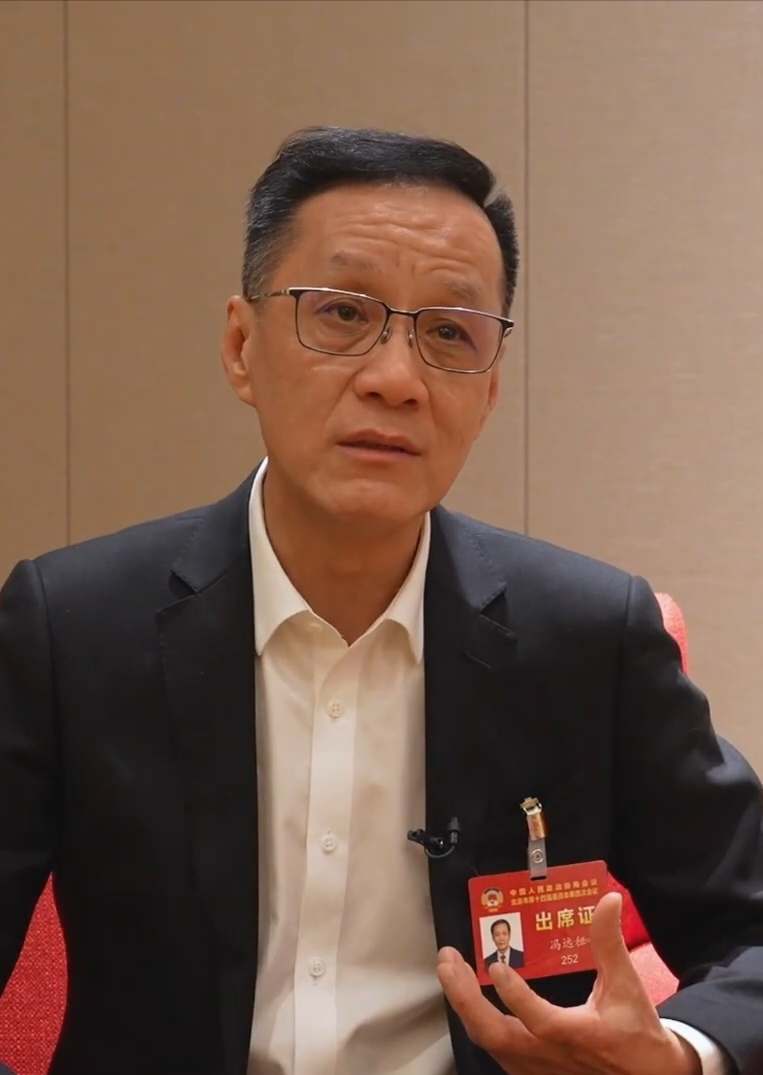
- Feng in 2026
- Born: 16 November 1962 (age 63); Beijing, China
- Occupation: Actor
- Years active: 1997–present
- Political party: Chinese Communist Party

Chinese name
- Simplified Chinese: 冯远征
- Traditional Chinese: 馮遠征
Transcriptions
Standard Mandarin
- Hanyu Pinyin: Féng Yuǎnzhēng

Feng Yuanzheng (Chinese: 冯远征; born November 16, 1962) is a Chinese actor.

== Selected filmography ==
- 1995: Postman
- 1998: Records of Kangxi's Travel Incognito
- 2003: Purple Butterfly
- 2004: A World Without Thieves
- 2004: Shanghai Story
- 2008: If You Are the One
- 2009: The Founding of a Republic
- 2011: The Founding of a Party
- 2011: Legend of a Rabbit (voice)
- 2012: Back to 1942
- 2012: The Next 11 Days
- 2013: Fall of Ming
- 2014: Red Amnesia
- 2016: The Bombing
- 2017: Six Years, Six Days
