= Cannot Live Without You =

- Taiwan movie poster
- Directed by: Leon Dai
- Written by: Leon Dai; Akira Chen
- Produced by: Akira Chen; Lin Chih-ju
- Starring: Chao Yo Hsuan; Akira Chen; Lin Chih-Ju
- Cinematography: Chang Hsiang-yu; Chou Yi-wen
- Edited by: Leon Dai
- Music by: Yukihiko Kageyama
- Production companies: Partyzoo Film; Luminoso Film
- Distributed by: Atom Cinema
- Release dates: April 18, 2009 (CPHPIX Film Festival); August 14, 2009 (Taiwan)
- Running time: 85 minutes
- Country: Taiwan
- Languages: Hakka, Taiwanese, Mandarin

Cannot Live Without You (Chinese: 不能没有你) is a 2009 Taiwanese drama film directed by Leon Dai, a professional Taiwanese actor. It was his second film as a director. This film was also selected as the official entry for 82nd Academy Awards for Best Foreign Language Film. Dai also acted as the co-screenwriter and editor of the film.

Cannot Live Without You was filmed entirely in black and white in digital format, then transferred to film for distribution. The film has a somewhat unconventional structure, beginning at the halfway point. It is based on a true story.

== Plot ==
The story concerns a poor Hakka dock worker Li Wu Hsiung fighting to reclaim the custody of his seven-year-old girl. Unsuccessful and clinging to the faithful daughter, he threatens to jump off a bridge.

As the film progresses, Li (played by the movie's co-screenwriter and first-time actor Akira Chen) gets embroiled in bureaucratic red tape and does all he can to get his daughter back from government institutional care.

== Awards and nominations ==
46th Golden Horse Awards

- Won: Best Film
- Won: Best Director (Leon Dai)
- Won: Best Original Screenplay (Leon Dai and Akira Chen)
- Won: The Outstanding Taiwanese Film of the Year
- Nominated: Best Actor (Akira Chen)
- Nominated: Best New Performer (Akira Chen)
- Nominated: Best Art Direction (HuaTa-Hua)
- Nominated: Best Editing (Leon Dai)

Asia-Pacific Film Festival

- Won: Best Director (Leon Dai)
- Won: Best cinematography (Chang Hsiang-yi)

Macau International Movie Festival

- Won: Best Film

40th International Film Festival of India

- Won: Golden Peacock (Best Film)

Durban International Film Festival

- Won: Best Feature Film

Vesoul International Film Festival of Asian Cinema

- Won: Best Film
