= Lee Hong-chi =

Taiwanese actor

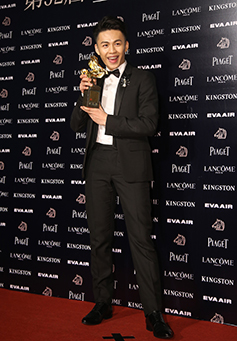
- Lee in 2015
- Born: 10 May 1990 (age 36); Jinshan Township, Taipei County, Taiwan (now Jinshan District, New Taipei, Taiwan)
- Other name: Li Hongqi
- Education: Chinese Culture University
- Occupations: Actor; drummer
- Years active: 2015–present

Chinese name
- Traditional Chinese: 李鴻其
- Simplified Chinese: 李鸿其
Transcriptions
Standard Mandarin
- Hanyu Pinyin: Lǐ Hóngqí
Southern Min
- Hokkien POJ: Lí Hông-kî

Lee Hong-chi (Chinese: 李鴻其; pinyin: Lǐ Hóngqí; Pe̍h-ōe-jī: Lí Hông-kî; born 10 May 1990) is a Taiwanese actor. He is best known for starring in the 2015 film Thanatos, Drunk, for which he was named Best New Performer at the 52nd Golden Horse Awards. In 2023, he won Lion of the Future Award at the 80th Venice International Film Festival for his film directorial debut, Love Is a Gun.

== Early life and education ==
Lee was born in Jinshan District, New Taipei. He was educated at the Taipei Hwa Kang Arts School and at the Chinese Culture University.

== Filmography ==
=== Film ===
Year	English title	Chinese title	Role	Notes/Ref.
2015	Thanatos, Drunk	醉·生梦死	Rat	
2016	Love After Time	愛在世界末日	Army officer	Short film
2017	City of Rock	缝纫机乐队	Dynamite	
2017	Namiya	解忧杂货店	Qin Lang	
2018	Cities of Last Things	幸福城市	Chang	
2018	Baby	宝贝儿	Xiao Jun	
2019	Long Day's Journey into Night	地球最后的夜晚	Bai Mao	
2019	Synapses	那个我最亲爱的陌生人	Qiang Shou	
2020	Tigertail	虎尾	young Pin-Jui	
2020	Back to the Wharf	风平浪静	Li Tang (adult)	
2020	Love You Forever	我在时间尽头等你	Lin Ge	
2020	I Remember	明天你是否依然爱我	Fei Li	
2023	Love Is a Gun	愛是一把槍	Fan Shu	also director and screenwriter
2023	Last Suspect	拯救嫌疑人	Jin Zhixiong	
2026	Fuxi: Joy in Four Chapters	腹喜		

=== Television series ===
Year	English title	Chinese title	Role	Notes/Ref.
2013	Boys Can Fly	刺猬男孩	Ah Zhong	Cameo
2019	Go Go Squid!	亲爱的，热爱的	Mi Shaofei (Xiao Mi) 米邵飞（小米）	
2019	The Code of Siam	异域档案之暹罗密码	Li Tang	Cameo
2023	The Bionic Life	仿生人间	Yin Tianhong	

=== Music video appearances ===
Year	Artist	Song title	Notes/Ref.
2015	Roger Yang	"Slap" ("冷耳光")	

== Awards and nominations ==
Year	Award	Category	Nominated work	Result	Ref.
2015	17th Taipei Film Awards	Best Actor	Thanatos, Drunk	Won	
2015	52nd Golden Horse Awards	Best Leading Actor	Thanatos, Drunk	Nominated	
2015	52nd Golden Horse Awards	Best New Performer	Thanatos, Drunk	Won	
2016	10th Asian Film Awards	Best Newcomer	Thanatos, Drunk	Nominated	
2016	16th Chinese Film Media Awards	Best Actor	Thanatos, Drunk	Nominated	
2016	16th Chinese Film Media Awards	Best Newcomer	Thanatos, Drunk	Nominated	
2018	26th Shanghai Film Critics Awards	Best New Actor of the Year	City of Rock	Won	
2018	21st Shanghai International Film Festival	Asian New Talent Award for Best Actor	City of Rock	Nominated	
2018	55th Golden Horse Film Festival and Awards	Best Supporting Actor	Cities of Last Things	Nominated	
2019	21st Taipei Film Festival	Best Actor	Cities of Last Things	Nominated	
2019	19th Chinese Film Media Awards	Best Supporting Actor	Cities of Last Things	Nominated	
2023	80th Venice International Film Festival	Grand Prize in the Venice International Critics' Week section	Love Is a Gun	Nominated	
2023	80th Venice International Film Festival	Lion of the Future – "Luigi De Laurentiis" Venice Award for a Debut Film	Love Is a Gun	Won	
2023	60th Golden Horse Awards	Best New Director	Love Is a Gun	Nominated	
2023	60th Golden Horse Awards	FIPRESCI Prize	Love Is a Gun	Nominated	
2023	47th São Paulo International Film Festival	New Directors Competition	Love Is a Gun	Nominated	
2024	25th BAFICI Buenos Aires International Festival of Independent Cinema	Best Feature Film in the International Competition	Love Is a Gun	Nominated	
