= Bad Education (2022 film) =

- Promotional poster
- Chinese: 黑的教育
- Literal meaning: "Black education"
- Hanyu Pinyin: Hēi de Jiàoyù
- Directed by: Kai Ko
- Written by: Giddens Ko
- Produced by: Ko Yao-zong; Lu Wei-chun; Giddens Ko; Midi Z Molly Fang
- Starring: Kent Tsai; Edison Song; Berant Zhu
- Narrated by: Huang Hsin-yao
- Cinematography: Chen Ta-pu
- Edited by: Shieh Meng-ju; Lee Huey
- Music by: Wong Kin-wai
- Production companies: Harvest 9 Road Entertainment; Machi Xcelsior Studios; Seashore Image Productions
- Distributed by: Machi Xcelsior Studios
- Release date: November 4, 2022 (Taipei Golden Horse)
- Running time: 77 minutes
- Country: Taiwan
- Language: Mandarin

Bad Education (Chinese: 黑的教育) is a 2022 Taiwanese crime mystery action film directed by Kai Ko in his directorial debut. The film received four nominations at the 59th Golden Horse Awards, including Best New Director for Ko. The film stars Kent Tsai, Edison Song and Berant Zhu.

== Premise ==
On the night of their high school graduation, three delinquents decide to exchange their darkest, most unspeakable secret.

== Cast ==
- Kent Tsai
- Edison Song
- Berant Zhu
- Leon Dai as Xing
- Daniel Hong as Tai
- Chang Ning
- Huang Hsin-yao as Police officer

== Production ==
In January 2020, it was reported that Giddens Ko was attached to Bad Education, and the project was one of the 33 projects shortlisted for that year's Hong Kong-Asia Film Financing Forum (HAF). The film was budgeted at around US$1.1 million and Molly Fang from Crystal Clear Co was attached to produce.

Principal photography began in January 2022, with Kai Ko replacing Giddens Ko as the director. Filming concluded in April 2022.

== Awards and nominations ==
Awards	Category	Recipient	Result	Ref.
59th Golden Horse Awards	Best Supporting Actor	Berant Zhu	Won	
59th Golden Horse Awards	Best New Director	Kai Ko	Nominated	
59th Golden Horse Awards	Best Visual Effects	ArChin Yen	Nominated	
59th Golden Horse Awards	Best Film Editing	Shieh Meng-ju and Lee Huey	Nominated	
59th Golden Horse Awards	FIPRESCI Prize	Bad Education	Nominated	
59th Golden Horse Awards	NETPAC Award	Bad Education	Nominated	
59th Golden Horse Awards	Observation Missions for Asian Cinema Award	Bad Education	Nominated	
