= Cheng Yu-chieh =

Taiwanese film director

- 鄭有傑
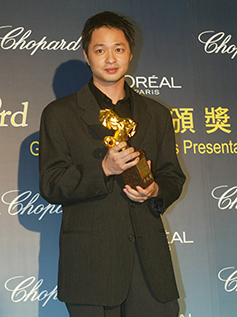
- Cheng in November 2006
- Born: November 27, 1977 (age 48)
- Education: National Taiwan University
- Occupations: Film director; screenwriter; actor
- Years active: 2000–present
- Spouse: Dai Hai-lun (戴海倫) (m. 2008)
- Children: 3

Cheng Yu-chieh (born November 27, 1977) is a Taiwanese director, a screenwriter and an actor. His first feature film Do Over (一年之初) in 2006 won the top prize in Taipei Film Festival and was invited to various international film festivals and gained Cheng international attention.

Besides being a screenwriter and director, Cheng is also known as an actor. In 2008 his portrayal of the police officer, Pan Shi-yuan, in Wang Shaudi's TV drama Police et vous (波麗士大人) was highly appreciated by the audience. Additionally, in 2009, he played Xu Fang-Guo in Chen Hui-Ling's TV drama Autumn's concerto (下一站，幸福) .

Cheng Yu-chieh's second feature film, Yang Yang (陽陽), was released on August 7, 2009, and was selected for the Berlin Film Festival. In 2010, Cheng Yu-chieh wrote and directed a five-episode mini-series entitled They explode the day before graduation (他們在畢業的前一天爆炸), which premiered on Public Television Service (公視). The mini-series received eight nominations at the 46th Golden Bell Awards in 2011, winning five major awards, including Cheng Yu-chieh's Mini-Series/Movie Screenplay Award.

On April 5, 2012, Cheng founded the Filmosa Pictures Production Company (一期一會影像製作有限公司), producing films, stage shows, music videos, etc.

== Early life ==
Cheng Yu-chieh began to participate in filmmaking while he was a student at National Taiwan University majoring in Economics. He starred in a few student films and attempted scriptwriting. His then wrote, directed, and acted in his first short film Baby face, which won the Special Jury Prize at the 2002 Taipei Film Festival for Student Film Golden Lion Awards. His 2001 short film Summer, dream (石碇的夏天) won multiple awards, including Best Short Film at the 38th Golden Horse Awards and Best Narrative Feature at the 2002 Taipei Film Awards.

Cheng was able to procure NT$8 million of subsidy from the Taiwanese government's film funding program to make his first feature film Do over, which is based on his award winning script (the 26th Excellent Screenplay Awards in 2003).

Cheng Yu-chieh and his wife Dai Hai-lun were married in June 2008. Dai Hai-Lun also works in the film industry and has served as the Director of the Domestic Affairs Department of the Golden Horse Awards.

Cheng Yu-chieh's father is an overseas Chinese living in Japan. Cheng learned Japanese from a young age and is fluent in the language. He is also the translator of the Chinese version of the Japanese novel Still Walking.

== Filmography ==
Short film
Year	Chinese title	English title
2000	私顏	Baby Face
2001	石碇的夏天	Summer, Dream
2011	潛規則（10+10）	Unwritten rules in Ten Plus Ten

Film
Year	Chinese title	English title
2006	一年之初	DO OVER
2009	陽陽	Yang Yang
2015	太陽的孩子	Panay
2020	親愛的房客	Dear Tenant
2025	南方時光	Before the Bright Day

TV show
Year	Chinese title	English title
2010	他們在畢業的前一天爆炸	Days we stared at the sun
2017	他們在畢業的前一天爆炸2	Days we stared at the sun II

Television film
Year	Chinese title	English title
2012	野蓮香	My Little Honey Moon
2017	老海人洛馬比克	Old Seafarer

== Acting ==
Short film
Year	Chinese title	English title	Role
2000	私顏	Baby Face	
2001	愛我在今宵	Love Me Tonight	
2005	海巡尖兵	The Pain of Others	The senior soldier
2007	爸爸的手指頭	Father's Finger	Grown-up A-Gui (阿貴)
2017	繁花盛開	Blossom	Lena
2018	再會！方舟	Farewell to the Ark	Jie (阿杰)
2019	最後一眼	The Last Gaze	The husband
2019	小洋	The Child of Nowhere	Li Ying-Shen (李英伸)
2019	陽關太平	Rest in Mist	Axiong (阿雄)
2021	錦鯉墜落	Falling Koi	
2021	午後的懸涯	Afternoon on the Cliff	

TV series
Year	Chinese title	English title	Role
2008	波麗士大人	Police et Vous	Pan Shih-yuan (潘士淵)
2009	下一站，幸福	Autumn's Concerto	Xu Fang-kuo (許方國)
2014	流氓蛋糕店	CHOCOLAT	Ye Da-ren (葉達人)
2019	鏡子森林	The Mirror	Huang Kuo-wei (黃國偉)
2021	超感應學園	Sometimes When we Touch	Chief Chang
2021	天橋上的魔術師	The Magician on the Skywalk	The special agent
2022	我願意	The Amazing Grace of Σ	President Chang
2025	零日攻擊	Zero Day	

Television
Year	Chinese title	English title	Role
2009	公視人生劇展－垃圾魚	Life story: Le-se yu/Garbage fish	Hao Fu-zu (郝富足)
2011	公視學生劇展－我的拼湊家庭	Innovative story: My Transformed Family	A-Ming (阿銘)
2011	公視學生劇展－下落村的來電	Innovative story: The Blackout Village	Worker of Taiwan Power Company
2014	公視學生劇展－大象的手指會跳舞	Innovative story: Lemon Grass	Teacher Zhou (周老師)
2020	格瑞特真相	The Greater Good	Chao Si-yuan 趙思源
2021	公視人生劇展－濱西小鎮	Life Stories: Left Behind	Zhang Yan-bo (張彥博)

Stage show
Year	Chinese title	English title	Role
2019	時光の手箱：我的阿爸和卡桑	A Suitcase of Memories	Yan Hui-min (顏惠民)

== Awards and honors ==
Year	Award	Category	Work	Outcome
2001	38nd Golden Horse Awards	Best short film	Summer, dream	Won
2002	Taipei Film Awards	Best narrative feature	Summer, dream	Won
2006	Taipei Film Awards	Audience Choice Award	DO OVER	Won
2006	Taipei Film Awards	NT$1 million Grand Prize	DO OVER	Won
2006	43rd Golden Horse Awards	Formosa Film Award	DO OVER	Won
2009	Taipei Film Awards	Special Jury Award	Yang Yang	Won
2011	46th Golden Bell Awards	Mini-Series/Movie Screenplay Award	Days we stared at the sun	Won
2015	Taipei Film Awards	Audience Choice Award	Wawa no cidal	Won
2018	53rd Golden Bell Awards	Best Miniseries	Days we stared at the sun II	Won
2018	53rd Golden Bell Awards	Best Directing for a Miniseries or Television Film	Days we stared at the sun II	Won
2020	57th Golden Horse Awards	Best original screenplay	Dear tenant	Nominated

== Political concerns ==
Cheng Yu-chieh is straightforward with his political views in his films in interviews. In 2011, his short film Unwritten rules in Ten Plus Ten, which was supported by Taipei Golden Horse Film Festival Executive Committee, revealed his concern about the inevitable political consequences of embracing China's film market: loss of creative freedom. Wawa No Cidal (2015), a film Cheng co-directed with Lekal Sumi Cilangasan, is critical of the government's economic development plan that did not take into consideration the destruction of the environment and the indigenous people in the east coast of Taiwan. His TV series, Days We Stared at The Sun II, is set between 2013 and 2017, after the Sunflower Student Movement. When being asked whether he would compromise or revise his future works due to political considerations, he answered that “What motivated me is faith, not fear. I would not let fear decide my future.”
