= Crazy Racer =

- Film poster
- Traditional Chinese: 瘋狂的賽車
- Simplified Chinese: 疯狂的赛车
- Hanyu Pinyin: fēngkuáng de sàichē
- Directed by: Ning Hao
- Written by: Ning Hao
- Produced by: Peter Lam; Han Sanping
- Starring: Huang Bo; Jiu Kong; Rong Xiang; Jack Kao; Wang Shuangbao
- Cinematography: Du Jie
- Edited by: Tang Hua
- Music by: Dong Dongdong; Ma Shangyou; Evan Chan
- Production companies: Beijing Film Studio; Warner China Film HG Corporation
- Distributed by: China Film Group
- Release date: 20 January 2009 (China)
- Running time: 110 minutes
- Country: China
- Languages: Standard Mandarin; Various Mandarin dialects Hokkien

Crazy Racer, also known in some countries as Silver Medalist, is a 2009 Chinese black comedy film directed and written by Ning Hao and stars Huang Bo. It was filmed mostly in the southern coastal city of Xiamen.

== Plot ==
The plot follows four seemingly separate stories that intersect and converge at points throughout the movie. It begins with the protagonist Geng Hao, an up-and-coming cyclist from Xiamen, losing a must-win race and subsequently being tricked into sponsoring an energy drink containing illegal performance-enhancing substances by corrupt businessman Li Fala, which causes him to forfeit the winnings from his silver medal. Disgraced and outlawed from ever participating again in the sport, Geng's coach suffers from a heart attack, prompting Geng to seek retribution from Li, who he believes is the cause. In the process of obtaining the money for his coach's funeral, Geng crosses the paths of local criminals, perpetually confused policemen and even Taiwanese gangsters.

== Cast ==
- Huang Bo
- Jiu Kong
- Rong Xiang
- Jack Kao
- Wang Shuangbao
- Ba Duo
- Xu Zheng
- Wang Xun

== Reception ==
The film garnered mostly positive reviews from the Chinese press although it has remained relatively unknown outside of mainland China.

Perry Lam of Muse praises Ning Hao's direction: 'the movie leaps from scene to scene with such an athletic deftness and comic inevitability that the many unlikely curves and switches in the plot and the same setups feel almost like the machinery of fate.'
