= Leon Dai =

Taiwanese actor and film director

- 戴立忍
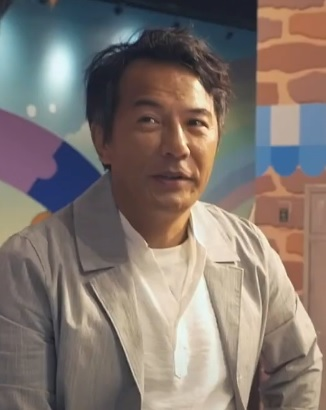
- Dai in 2020
- Born: 27 July 1966 (age 60)
- Awards: Golden Horse Awards – Best Supporting Actor; 1999 A Chance to Die; Best Short Film; 2002 Two Summers; Best Director; 2009 Cannot Live Without You; Best Film; 2009 Cannot Live Without You; Best Original Screenplay; 2009 Cannot Live Without You; Outstanding Taiwanese Film of the Year; 2009 Cannot Live Without You; Best Popularity Film; 2009 Cannot Live Without You

Chinese name
- Chinese: 戴立忍
- Hanyu Pinyin: Dài Lìrěn
- Hokkien POJ: Tè Li̍p-jím

Leon Dai (Chinese: 戴立忍; pinyin: Dài Lìrěn; Pe̍h-ōe-jī: Tè Li̍p-jím, born 27 July 1966) is a Taiwanese actor and film director. His film Cannot Live Without You (2009) was Taiwan's submission to the 82nd Academy Awards for Best Foreign Language Film. The film also won two awards at the 46th Golden Horse Film Awards.

== Career ==
In 2016, Dai faced public anger in China over remarks perceived as supportive of the Taiwan independence movement, although he denied any such sympathies. Shooting for the film No Other Love had already been completed; he was fired and his scenes were dropped.

== Selected filmography ==
Year	Title	Role	Notes/Ref.
2023	Tomorrow Is a Long Time	Chua	
2022	Bad Education	Xing	
2021	Tomorrow Is a Long Time	Not yet confirmed	
2020	Your Name Engraved Herein	middle aged Chang Jia-han	
2017	The Great Buddha+	Kevin	
2016	Peaceful Island		
2015	The Master		
2015	Where's the Dragon?		
2015	Sentence Me Guilty		
2015	The Assassin		
2015	Hot Blood Band		
2015	Elena		
2014	Love Evolutionism		
2014	Secret Sharer	Captain Wang	
2014	(Sex) Appeal		
2013	Control	Devil	
2013	Fall of Ming	Sun Chuanting	
2009	Cannot Live Without You	Director	
2008	Parking		
2002	Double Vision		
2001	Betelnut Beauty		
1999	March of Happiness		
1999	Tempting Heart		
1997	Sweet Degeneration		

== Awards and nominations ==
Year	Name	Category	Nominated work	Result	Ref.
2020	Osaka Asian Film Festival	Best Supporting Actor		Won	
2020	Taipei Film Awards	Best Supporting Actor		Nominated	
2023	58th Golden Bell Awards	Best Supporting Actor in a Miniseries or Television Film	Wave Makers	Nominated	
