= Huang Bo =

Chinese actor and singer

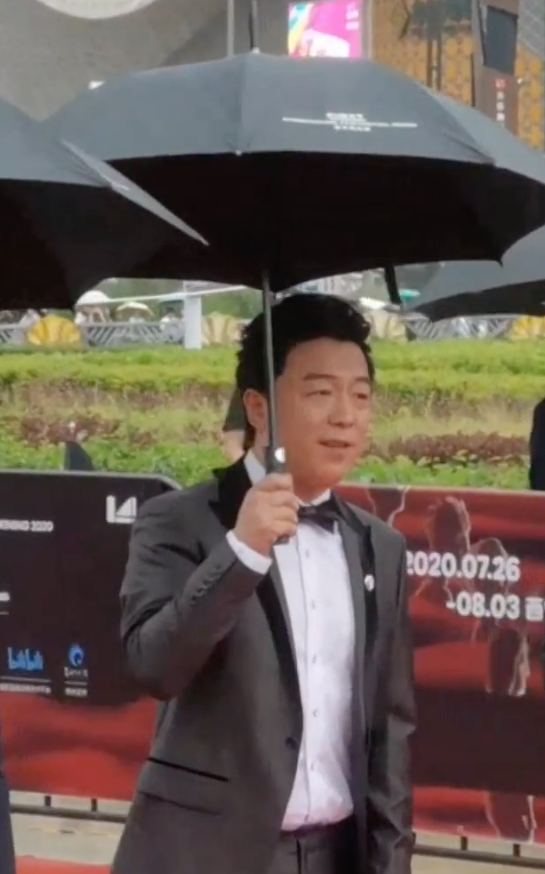
- Huang in 2020
- Born: 26 August 1974 (age 51); Qingdao, Shandong, China
- Education: Beijing Film Academy
- Occupations: Actor, singer
- Years active: 2000–present
- Height: 172.5 cm (5 ft 7.9 in)
- Awards: Golden Horse Awards – Best Leading Actor; 2009 'Cow'

Chinese name
- Traditional Chinese: 黃渤
- Simplified Chinese: 黄渤
Transcriptions
Standard Mandarin
- Hanyu Pinyin: Huáng Bó

Huang Bo (Chinese: 黄渤; pinyin: Huáng Bó; born August 26, 1974) is a Chinese actor and singer. After unsuccessfully pursuing a singing career for many years, he rose to fame with the surprise hit Crazy Stone (2006) and went on to build a film career known for his grassroots, street-smart comedic roles.

Huang ranked 34th on Forbes China Celebrity 100 list in 2013, 62nd in 2014, 22nd in 2015, 30th in 2017, 2nd in 2019, 52nd in 2020.

== Early life ==
Huang was born on August 26, 1974, in Jiuquan, Gansu, and raised in Qingdao, Shandong, although his hail originally was Lintao County, Gansu. Both of his parents worked as civil servants in the government. Before Huang became an actor, he was a bar singer, dance instructor, film dubber and factory owner. During his time singing in bars, he even had his own band named "Blue Sand Wind" (蓝色风沙)，performed throughout the country and worked as a dance coach for 7 years.

In 2000, Huang's friend since junior high school, actor Gao Hu, introduced him to director Guan Hu by chance, which started Huang's acting career. Huang wanted to study in the Beijing Film Academy, however he didn't receive the admission for the first time he applied. In 2002, Huang finally got admitted to the Academy, studying in Dubbing.

== Career ==
Two years later in 2004, Huang graduated from the Academy and became a professional voice actor. Before Huang's breakout role two years later, he had several small roles in different TV series.

In the year of 2006, Huang participated in director Ning Hao's low-budget black comedy film Crazy Stone, which proved to be a runaway hit and garnered him much exposure. In 2007, Huang won his first major award, for Best Supporting Actor at the 7th Chinese Film Media Awards. Moreover, his performance in the film Cow won him the Best Actor award at the 46th Golden Horse Awards.

Huang was considered one of the top actors in China in 2010. During the two years between 2010 and 2011, Huang performed in 5 films, and also started his music career.

In 2012, Huang's comedy film Lost in Thailand became the top-grossing domestic film at the Chinese box-office. He also starred in the suspense film Design of Death, which earned him Best Actor awards at the Beijing College Student Film Festival and China Film Directors' Guild Award.

In 2013, Huang starred in Stephen Chow's shenmo blockbuster film, Journey to the West: Conquering the Demons playing Sun Wukong. He appeared for free in the comedy film The Chef, the Actor, the Scoundrel directed by Guan Hu, and the noir film thriller No Man's Land where he played a killer. With his films, Huang became the top-grossing actor of 2013.

In 2014, Huang starred in Peter Chan's film on child-abduction, Dearest as a devastated father whose son was abducted; which earned him Best Actor nominations at several film awards. The same year he starred alongside Xu Zheng in the comedy film Breakup Buddies, which became one of the top-grossing domestic films at the Chinese box-office. On January 30, 2014, he appeared on the 2014 CCTV Spring Festival Gala and sang "My Requirements Are Not Too High" while walking.

In 2015, Huang co-starred in the fantasy blockbuster Mojin: The Lost Legend, which became one of the highest-grossing films in China.

In 2017, Huang won the Golden Goblet Award for his performance in the crime film The Conformist. The same year he headlined the science fiction film Battle of Memories.

In 2018, he launched his directorial debut The Island, also known as "A Good Play".

In 2019, it was announced that Huang will play Jiang Ziya in the upcoming fantasy film series Fengshen Trilogy directed by Wuershan. The film is based on the novel Investiture of the Gods.

In August 2021, the first solo album, Songs Saved for You Over the Years, was released.

On November 25, 2023, the new drama "Crossing the Sea of Anger" directed by Cao Baoping and starring Huang was released.

On June 19, 2024, the film "A Man and a Woman" starring Huang was premiered in the main competition section of the 26th Shanghai International Film Festival Golden Jubilee Awards.

== Personal life ==
The nickname of Huang's wife is Xiao Ou, and they married in 2007. Huang's daughter was born in July 2011.

== Filmography ==
=== Film ===
Year	English title	Chinese title	Role	Notes/Ref.
2000	Get In, and Go	上车，走吧	Gao Ming	
2006	Crazy Stone	疯狂的石头	Heipi	
2006	The Jimmy Hat	新街口	Er Zi	
2006	Big Movie	大电影之数百亿	Pan Zhiqiang	
2006	A Promise That Will Be Kept	一诺千金	Xi Liang	
2007	Hooked on You	每当变幻时	Porky	
2007	Air Diary	飞行日志	Lao Xian'er	Cameo
2008	Kung Fu Dunk	功夫灌籃	Master Huang	
2008	Fit Lover	爱情呼叫转移2：爱情左右	Male angel	
2009	Happy	高兴	Shi Renao	
2009	Iron Man	铁人	Zhao Yilin	
2009	Radish Warrior	倔强萝卜	Luo	
2009	Crazy Racer	疯狂的赛车	Geng Hao	
2009	Cow	斗牛	Niu Er	
2009	Tiny Dust，True Love	寻找微尘	Liang Bo	
2010	Just Another Pandora's Box	越光宝盒	Zhou Yu	
2010	Legend of the Fist: The Return of Chen Zhen	精武风云·陈真	Inspector Huang Hao Long	
2011	The Pretending Lovers	假装情侣	Chen	
2011	The Story of David	蛋炒饭	David	
2012	Black & White Episode I: The Dawn of Assault	痞子英雄之全面开战	Xu Dafu	
2012	Crazy Dinner Party	饭局也疯狂	Jia Ming	
2012	Guns and Roses	黄金大劫案	Agent	Cameo
2012	Design of Death	杀生	Niu Jieshi	
2012	Lost in Thailand	人再囧途之泰囧	Gao Bo	
2013	Journey to the West: Conquering the Demons	西游·降魔篇	Sun Wukong	
2013	Say Yes	101次求婚	Huang Da	
2013	The Chef, the Actor, the Scoundrel	厨子戏子痞子	Pi zi (Scoundrel)	
2013	No Man's Land	无人区	Killer (Lao'er)	
2014	Dearest	亲爱的	Tian Wenjun	
2014	Breakup Buddies	心花路放	Geng Hao	
2014	Black & White: The Dawn of Justice	痞子英雄2	Xu Dafu	Cameo
2014	I Am a Wolf	我是狼之火龙山大冒险		Voice actor
2015	Mojin: The Lost Legend	鬼吹灯之寻龙诀	Wang Kaixuan	
2016	Royal Treasure	极限挑战之皇家宝藏	Huang Bo	
2017	Buddies in India	大闹天竺	Tang Chasu	Cameo
2017	Battle of Memories	记忆大师	Jiang Feng	
2017	The Conformist	冰之下	Wang Haibo	
2018	The Island	一出好戏	Ma Jin	Director
2019	Crazy Alien	疯狂的外星人	Geng Hao	
2019	My People, My Country	我和我的祖国		
2019	Gone with the Light	被光抓走的人		
2020	Lost in Russia	囧妈		Cameo
2020	My People, My Homeland	我和我的家乡	Huang Dabao	
2021	Back to the Wharf	风平浪静		
2021	Embrace Again	穿过寒冬拥抱你	Ayong	
2023	Creation of the Gods I: Kingdom of Storms	封神第一部：朝歌风云	Jiang Ziya	
2023	One and Only	热烈	Ding Lei	
2023	Papa	学爸	Lei Dali	
2023	Across the Furious Sea	涉过愤怒的海	Lao Jin	
2025	Creation of the Gods II: Demon Force	封神第二部：战火西岐	Jiang Ziya	
2025	Endless Journey of Love	时间之子	Shi Qi	Voice only

=== Television ===
Year	English title	Chinese title	Role	Notes/Ref.
2002	Black Hole	黑洞	Tang Wenjun	
2002	Servant Girls in the Red Mansions	红楼丫头	Xing'er	
2005	Labor of the Survival	生存之民工	Xue Liu	
2007	Dead End Heaven	幻想之旅	Hu Anzhi	
2007	Fuwa	福娃	Pixiu (Voice role)	
2008	Being Alive	活着真好	Xue Liu	
2010	The Outlander	外乡人	Ququ	
2012	A Unique Militiaman	民兵葛二蛋	Ge Erdan	
2013	Troubled Times Three Brothers	火线三兄弟	Tian Sanlin	
2014	Blade	锋刃	Shen Xilin	
2015	Once Upon a Time in Qingdao	青岛往事	Wang Mancang	

== Accolades ==
Year	Award	Category	Nominated work	Ref.
2007	7th Chinese Film Media Awards	Best Supporting Actor	Crazy Stone	
2009	46th Golden Horse Film Festival and Awards	Best Actor (with Nick Cheung)	Cow	
2009	12th Golden Phoenix Awards	Society Award	Cow	
2010	17th Beijing College Student Film Festival	Best Actor	Cow	
2013	4th China Film Director's Guild Awards	Best Actor	Design of Death	
2013	20th Beijing College Student Film Festival	Best Actor	Design of Death	
2013	1st China International Film Festival London	Best Supporting Actor	Lost in Thailand	
2014	8th Asian Film Awards	Best Supporting Actor	No Man's Land	
2014	1st Vancouver Chinese Film Festival	Best Actor	No Man's Land	
2014	14th Chinese Film Media Awards	Most Anticipated Actor	Journey to the West: Conquering the Demons	
2015	15th Golden Phoenix Awards	Society Award	—N/a	
2017	20th Shanghai International Film Festival	Best Actor	The Conformist	
