= List of Taiwanese male actors =

The following is a list of notable male actors from Taiwan

== B ==
- Bai Run-yin
- Bokeh Kosang

== C ==
- Bryan Chang
- Chang Chen
- Chang Chen-kuang
- Chang Feng
- Chang Fu-chien
- Joseph Chang
- Chang Kuo-chu
- Chang Kuo-tung
- Ray Chang
- Mark Chao
- Akio Chen
- Akira Chen
- Bamboo Chen
- Chen Bolin
- Chen Sung-young
- Chen Yi-wen
- Joe Cheng
- Roy Chiu
- Vic Chou
- Kaiser Chuang

== D ==
- Leon Dai

== F ==
- Fandy Fan
- Fan Kuang-yao
- Fu Meng-po

== H ==
- He Yi-hang
- Hsueh Shih-ling
- Hu Jhih-ciang
- Brando Huang
- Huang Di-yang
- Jag Huang
- River Huang
- Sean Huang

== J ==
- Jin Chao-chun
- Ethan Juan

== K ==
- Jack Kao
- Ko Chun-hsiung
- Ko Hsiang-ting
- Lawrence Ko
- Ku Pao-ming

== L ==
- Lan Cheng-lung
- Christopher Lee
- Lee Hong-chi
- Lee Lee-zen
- Lee Kang-sheng
- Lee Tien-chu
- Toby Lee
- Austin Lin
- Da-her Lin
- Liu Kuan-ting
- Crowd Lu
- Lung Shao-hua
- Sihung Lung

== M ==
- Ma Ju-lung
- Mo Tzu-yi

== N ==
- Doze Niu

== O ==
- Ou Wei

== P ==
- Wilber Pan

== S ==
- Shih Ming-shuai
- Suming

== T ==
- Tai Chih-yuan
- Tang Chuan
- Ting Chiang
- Tsai Chen-nan
- Tsao Yu-ning
- Tseng Jing-hua
- Tsui Fu-sheng
- Tuo Tsung-hua

== V ==
- Rhydian Vaughan

== W ==
- Wang Jui
- Kingone Wang
- Wang Po-chieh
- Jimmy Wang Yu
- James Wen
- Wu Chien-ho
- Wu Kang-ren
- Wu Pong-fong

== Y ==
- Tony Yang
- Weber Yang
- Yao Chun-yao
- Yi Ming
- Yu An-shun

== Z ==
- Berant Zhu
