= Bai Run-yin =

Taiwanese actor (born 2009)

- 白潤音
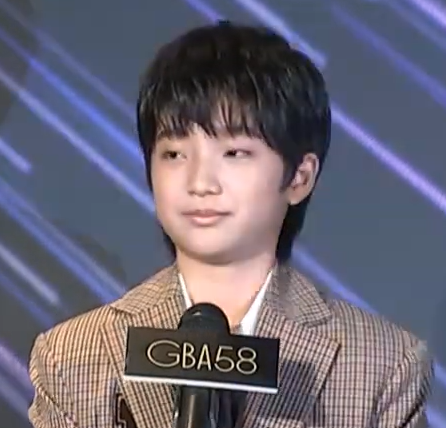
- Bai in September 2023
- Born: Bai Run-yin; 3 July 2009 (age 17); Taiwan
- Occupation: Actor
- Years active: 2015–present
- Family: Bai Xiao-ying (sister)

Bai Run-yin (Chinese: 白潤音; born 3 July 2009) is a Taiwanese actor. He made his feature film debut with A Fish Out of Water (2017) and gained public recognition for his roles in Mr. Long (2017) and Dear Tenant (2020). He won Best Supporting Actor in a Miniseries in the 57th Golden Bell Awards for his performance in the Netflix series More Than Blue: The Series (2022) and received a nomination for Best Actor in the 26th Taipei Film Awards for his leading role as Liao Je in Old Fox (2023).

== Early life ==
Bai was born on 3 July 2009, and grew up in Taipei. He has an older sister Bai Xiao-ying, who is two years his senior and also pursued a career as a child actress. They were born to a Japanese mother who works as a translator and a Taiwanese father who was a photographer but became the agent for the Bai siblings as they entered acting. Bai began filming television advertisements at the age of five, after his father's friend who worked in the advertising industry saw photos of him taken by his father. He began martial arts training in Bajiquan at six, inspired by his interest in wuxia novels and comics.

== Career ==
In 2015, Bai made his acting debut in the PTS period drama The Best of Youth, portraying the younger version of Austin Lin's character when he was five years old. He started appearing in music videos and television series regularly from the age of six, including minor roles in the PTS series House of Toy Bricks and the TVBS series Family Time. In 2017, he made his feature film debut with a leading role as Yi-an, a preschooler struggling with family relationships, in the drama film A Fish Out of Water, on the recommendation of his The Best of Youth co-star Wu Chien-ho. Guy Lodge of Variety praised Bai for his ability to "impressively navigate the prickliest aspects of Yi-an's psychology", evoking sympathy from the audience. He then secured a starring role as Jun, a child who saves an assassin played by Chang Chen, in the Japanese film Mr. Long. He was cast by director Sabu due to his martial arts background and Japanese ancestry. He also appeared in a minor role in the horror comedy film Secrets in the Hot Spring the following year.

In 2020, Bai landed another starring role as You-yu, the son of a landlord (played by Chen Shu-fang) who is cared for by a tenant suspected of murdering the landlord (played by Mo Tzu-yi) in the drama film Dear Tenant. Han Cheung of Taipei Times described Bai's performance as "no slouch", noting that he matched the talents of his co-star Mo, "deftly portraying a shy and reserved kid who is emotionally intelligent and wise beyond his years"; Tay Yek Keak of Today complimented Bai and Mo's chemistry and considered him a "very good" actor; while Lee Mei of HK01 also praised Bai for "delivering heartfelt emotions to the audience". In 2021, Bai starred as An Ke-le, the terminally ill son of Ivy Shao's character, in the Netflix romance series More Than Blue: The Series, and his performance in his character's death scene garnered online acclaim. Lim Yian Lu noted in her Yahoo! Lifestyle review for the first two episodes that Bai's performance maintained the standards he set in Dear Tenant, and he won Best Supporting Actor in a Miniseries or Television Film in the 57th Golden Bell Awards for his role. He also appeared in the HBO Asia fantasy series Twisted Strings as part of the ensemble cast, playing a young boy who befriends Tony Yang's character while hospitalized. In 2021, Bai announced a hiatus from acting to focus on junior high school, concluding with his role as Keat, the son of a fisherman (played by Lee Lee-zen) who fantasizes about mythical creatures, in the 2022 fantasy film Hello! Tapir which he filmed at the age of eight. Han Cheung of Taipei Times commended Bai for his "nuanced portrayal of an introspective yet strong-willed child" and acknowledged his rapid improvement since Dear Tenant.

Bai's hiatus lasted about two years, before he returned in late 2022, landing the male lead role Liao Je in Hsiao Ya-chuan's drama film Old Fox, where he cited the screenplay as "irresistible". Chien Ying-jou, writing for Yahoo! Lifestyle, praised the decision to use Bai as the viewpoint character and described his performance as "magical" and refreshingly different from the stereotypical crying kids often seen; Alex Chung of HK01 called Bai's performance "outstanding and natural", stating that he "grasped the character's development and delivered it precisely"; while Andrew Tomoe of The News Lens remarked on his performance as "brilliant". Bai received a nomination for Best Actor in the 26th Taipei Film Awards for his performance. In 2024, Bai appeared in the horror film Them Behind the Door, playing Bai Ling's grandson, both of whom fall victim to a demon.

== Filmography ==
=== Film ===
Year	Title	Role	Notes/Ref.
2017	A Fish Out of Water	Yi-an (怡安)	
2017	Mr. Long	Jun	
2018	Secrets in the Hot Spring	Boy in haunted house	
2020	Dear Tenant	Wang You-yu (王悠宇)	
2022	Hello! Tapir	Keat (阿吉)	
2023	Old Fox	Liao Jie (廖界)	
2024	Them Behind the Door	A-di (阿弟)	
2025	Mother Bhumi	Koon (阿坤)	

=== Television ===
Year	Title	Role	Notes/Ref.
2015	The Best of Youth	Young Tian-ming (天明)	Guest role
2017	House of Toy Bricks	Ghost kid	Guest role
2017	Family Time	Bao-ru's nephew	Guest role
2021	More Than Blue: The Series	An Ke-le (安可樂)	Recurring role
2022	Twisted Strings	Lun (倫倫)	Co-starring
2025	The World Between Us	Luo Yu (羅譽)	Co-starring (season 2)

== Awards and nominations ==
Year	Award	Category	Work	Result	Ref.
2022	57th Golden Bell Awards	Best Supporting Actor in a Miniseries or Television Film	More Than Blue: The Series	Won	
2023	26th Taipei Film Awards	Best Actor	Old Fox	Nominated	
