= Taipei Film Awards =

Taiwanese cultural awards

The Taipei Film Awards (Chinese: 台北電影獎; pinyin: Táiběi Diànyǐng Jiǎng; Pe̍h-ōe-jī: Tâi-pak Tiān-iáⁿ-chióng) are given by the Taipei Film Festival to honor achievements in Taiwanese cinema. Winners are selected from Taiwanese films which are presented in the competition section at the festival.

== Grand Prize winners ==
Year	Film	Director	Genre
2002	Summers	Leon Dai	Short Film
2003	Stardust 15749001	Hou Chi-jan	Short Film
2003	Exit	Chen Lung-wei	Animation
2004	Farewell 1999	Wuna Wu	Documentary
2005	Let It Be	Yen Lan-chuan and Juang Yi-tzeng	Documentary
2006	Do Over	Cheng Yu-Chieh	Narrative Feature
2007	I Don't Want to Sleep Alone	Tsai Ming-liang	Narrative Feature
2008	Cape No. 7	Wei Te-sheng	Narrative Feature
2009	Cannot Live Without You	Leon Dai	Narrative Feature
2010	Let the Wind Carry Me	Kwan Pung-leung and Chiang Hsiu-chiung	Documentary
2011	Taivalu	Huang Hsin-yao	Documentary
2011	A Gift for Father's Day-The Tragedy of Hsiaolin Village Part 1	Luo Hsing-chieh	Documentary
2012	Hometown Boy	Yao Hung-I	Documentary
2013	A Rolling Stone	Shen Ko-shang	Documentary
2014	Unveil the Truth II：State Apparatus	Kevin H.J. Lee	Documentary
2015	Thanatos, Drunk	Chang Tso-chi	Narrative Feature
2016	Lokah Laqi	Laha Mebow	Narrative Feature
2017	The Great Buddha +	Huang Hsin-yao	Narrative Feature
2018	On Happiness Road	Sung Hsin-yin	Animation
2019	Last Year When the Train Passed by	Huang Pang-Chuan	Documentary
2020	Detention	John Hsu	Narrative Feature
2021	The Catch	Hsu Che-chia	Documentary Short Film
2022	A Holy Family	Elvis Lu A-liang	Documentary
2023	Diamond Marine World	Huang Hsiu-yi	Documentary

== Film awards ==
Year	Best Narrative Feature	Best Documentary	Best Short Film	Best Animation	Press Award	Audience Choice Award
1998	Grandma and Her Ghosts	—	—	—	—	—
1999	Darkness and Light	—	—	—	—	—
2000	Mirror Image	—	—	—	—	—
2001 (not held)	—	—	—	—	—	—
2002	—	Corner's	—	—	—	—
2003	Badu's Homework	Echo	—	Meteor	—	—
2004	Goodbye, Dragon Inn	The Spirit of Eight River	—	Innocent Life	Goodbye, Dragon Inn	Ocean Fever
2005	The Wayward Cloud	Biographies of the Macaques	—	The Man of the Hour	Let It Be: The Last Rice Farmers	Jump! Boys
2006	The Pain of Others	Doctor	—	Contagion	An Encounter with Chungliao	Do Over
2007	The Secret in the Wind	Rock the Boat	—	Check Mate	Island Etude	The Soul of Bread
2008	—	They Are Flying	The End of the Tunnel	—	Winds of September	What on Earth Have I Done Wrong?!
2009	—	Yellow Sheep River	Panic House	—	Cannot Live Without You	A Place of One's Own
2010	The Fourth Portrait	Let The Wind Carry Me	Dad's Not Home	A Piece of Cake	A Piece of Cake	Taipei Exchanges
2011	When Love Comes	Taivalu; A Gift for Father's Day-The Tragedy of Hsiaolin Village Part 1	The Blackout Village	The Other Side	Jump Ashin! The Man Behind the Book	Jump Ashin!
2012	Cha Cha for Twins	Hometown Boy	I Wake Up in a Strange Bed	The Present	Girlfriend, Boyfriend	Touch of the Light
2013	Soul	A Rolling Stone	The Coward	On Happiness Road; Breathe	Together	Rock Me to the Moon
2014	Exit	Unveil the Truth II: State Apparatus	The Busy Young Psychic	Unknown Memory	Ice Poison	Kano
2015	Thanatos, Drunk	A Life That Sings	The Death of a Security Guard	The Vending Machine	Thanatos, Drunk	Panay
2016	Hang in There, Kids!	Hebei Taipei	Anchorage Prohibited	Crash Testing	The Taste of Apple	The Tenants Downstairs
2017	The Great Buddha +	Small Talk	True Emotion Behind the Wall	Stories About Him	The Road to Mandalay	Condemned Practice Mode
2018	Dear Ex	Our Youth, in Taiwan	02-06	On Happiness Road; Neon	Dear Ex	On Happiness Road
2019	Dad's Suit	Your Face	Last Year When the Train Passed by	Where Am I Going?	Turning 18	The Age of Awakening
2020	Detention	The Good Daughter	In This Land We're Briefly Ghosts	Grand Adventure Railroad	Whale Island	We Are Champions
2021	My Missing Valentine	The Catch	Piano Lessons	Night Bus	A Lean Soul	The Silent Forest
2022	American Girl	A Holy Family	Good Day	DEMIGOD：The Legend Begins	DEMIGOD：The Legend Begins	A Holy Family
2023	Gaga	Diamond Marine World	Big Day	The Egret River	Be Myself	Good Morni MIT

== Individual awards ==
Year	Best Director	Best Screenplay	Best Actor	Best Actress	Best Supporting Actor	Best Supporting Actress	Best New Talent
1998	Hou Hsiao-hsien for Flowers of Shanghai	—	—	Rene Liu for The Personals	—	—	June Tsai for Jam
1999	—	—	—	Tsai Tsan-te for Bad Girl Trilogy	—	—	Lee Kang-i for Darkness and Light
2000	Chen Yi-wen for The Cabbie	—	Alex Fong for Red Rain	Lee Kang-i for Sunny Doll	Wang Jui for Forgive and Forget; Cheung Ka-nin for The Cabbie	Chao Mei-ling for Lament of the Sand River	Leslie Hsiang for Pure Accidents
2001 (not held)	—	—	—	—	—	—	—
2002	—	—	—	—	—	—	Jag Huang for Summer, Dream
2003	—	—	—	—	—	—	—
2004	—	—	—	—	—	—	—
2005	—	—	—	—	—	—	—
2006	—	—	—	—	—	—	—
2007	—	—	—	—	—	—	—
2008	Yang Ya-che for Orz Boyz	Henry Tsai and Tom Lin Shu-yu for Winds of September	Doze Niu for What on Earth Have I Done Wrong?!	Janine Chang for What on Earth Have I Done Wrong?!	—	—	Wang Po-chieh for Winds of September
2009	Chung Mong-hong for Parking	Chung Mong-hong for Parking	Akira Chen for Cannot Live Without You	Sandrine Pinna for Yang Yang	Lin Chih-ju for Cannot Live Without You	Lu Yi-ching for A Place of One's Own	Peggy Tseng for Parking
2010	Cheng Wen-tang for Tears	Essay Liu for Seven Days in Heaven	Bi Xiao-hai for The Fourth Portrait	Ivy Chen for Hear Me	Tsai Chen-nan for Ending Cut	Cheung Si-yin for Seven Days in Heaven	Amber Kuo for Au Revoir Taipei
2011	Chen Hung-i for Honey Pupu	Chang Tso-chi for When Love Comes	Wu Pong-fong for Ranger	Nikki Hsieh for Honey Pupu, Make Up	Lawrence Ko for Jump Ashin!	He Zi-hua for When Love Comes	Li Yi-jie for When Love Comes
2012	Yao Hung-i for Hometown Boy	Yang Yi-chien for Cha Cha for Twins	Joseph Chang for Girlfriend, Boyfriend	Sandrine Pinna for Touch of the Light	Bryan Chang for Girlfriend, Boyfriend	Amber Kuo for Love	Eric Lin for Starry Starry Night
2013	Chan Ching-lin for A Breath from the Bottom	Lin Chen-hao for Forever Love	Jimmy Wang for Soul	Lin Yen-Cheng for My Last Homework	Tsai Ming-shiou for A Breath from the Bottom	Ivy Yin for The Will To Power	Huang Shao-yang for Together
2014	Midi Z for Ice Poison	Yee Chin-yen for Meeting Dr. Sun	Lee Kang-sheng for Stray Dogs	Chen Shiang-chyi for Exit	Tsao Yu-ning for Kano	Lin Mei-hsiu for Zone Pro Site	Yu Pei-jen for The Busy Young Psychic
2015	Tsai Ming-liang for No No Sleep	Doze Niu and Tseng Li-ting for Paradise in Service	Lee Hong-chi for Thanatos, Drunk	Hiromi Nagasaku for The Furthest End Awaits	Cheng Jen-shuo for Thanatos, Drunk	Lü Hsueh-feng for Thanatos, Drunk	Wilson Hsu for Spring Awakening
2016	Laha Mebow for Hang in There, Kids!	Huang Ya-li for Le Moulin	River Huang for The Tag-Along	Hsu Wei-ning for The Tag-Along, White Lies, Black Lies, End of A Century: Miea's Story	Kaiser Chuang for Maverick	Jian Man-shu for Maverick	Ensemble cast of Hang in There, Kids!
2017	Lu Po-shun for Wild Tides	Huang Xi for Missing Johnny	Chris Wu for White Ant	Ivy Yin for The Island That All Flow By	Sean Huang for Missing Johnny	Liu Yin-shan for Cloudy	Rima Zeidan for Missing Johnny
2018	Hsiao Ya-Chuan for Father to Son	Gilles Yang for The Bold, the Corrupt, and the Beautiful	Roy Chiu for Dear Ex	Hsieh Ying-hsuan for Dear Ex	Cheng Jen-Shuo for GATAO 2-The New Leader Rising	Wen Qi for The Bold, the Corrupt, and the Beautiful	Utjung Tjakivalid for Alifu, the Prince/ss
2019	Tsai Ming-liang for Your Face	Lin Hao-pu for 3 Days 2 Nights	Hou Tao-hsiao for Dad's Suit	Lee Yi-chieh for Wild Sparrow; Liu Yin-shang for A Trip with Mom	Da-her Lin for Secrets in The Hot Spring	Phoebe Huang for Dad's Suit	Tsai Jia-yin for Heavy Craving
2020	Chang Jung-chi for We Are Champions	Kao Pin-Chuan, Birdy Fong and Tsai Yi-ho for The Gangs, the Oscars, and the Walking Dead	Mo Tzu-yi for Dear Tenant	Gingle Wang for Detention	Li Ying-chuan for Synapses	Eleven Yao for The Gangs, the Oscars, and the Walking Dead	Li Li-jung for See You, Sir
2021	Chen Yu-hsun for My Missing Valentine	Mag Hsu for I Missed You	Roy Chiu for Man in Love	Peace Yang for Wrath of Desire	Liu Kuan-ting for Treat or Trick	Bai Bai for Treat or Trick	Buffy Chen for The Silent Forest
2022	Giddens Ko for Till We Meet Again	Lou Yi-an, Singing Chen for Goddamned ASURA	Kai Ko for Till We Meet Again	Chen Shiang-chyi for Increasing Echo	Kao Ying-hsuan for Incantation	Wang Yu-xuan for Goddamned Asura	Caitlin Fang for American Girl
2023	Lin Chun-yang for Eye of the Storm	Cheng Wei-hao, Sharon Wu Chin-jung for Marry My Dead Body	Wang Po-chieh for Eye of the Storm	Lu Hsiao-fen for Day Off	Fu Meng-po for Day Off	Yang Li-yin for Coo-Coo 043	Wilang Lalin for Gaga; Yeh Hsiao-fei for Who'll Stop the Rain
2024	Hsiao Ya-chuan for Old Fox	Hsiao Ya-chuan, Chan I-wen for Old Fox	Ethan Juan for The Pig, the Snake and the Pigeon	Audrey Lin for Trouble Girl	Lee Lee-zen for The Pig, the Snake and the Pigeon	Ivy Chen for Trouble Girl	Zheng Fei-fei for BIG
2025	John Hsu for Dead Talents Society	Tom Lin Shu-yu for Yen and Ai-Lee	Wanlop Rungkumjad for Mongrel	Alexia Kao for Family Matters	Lee Kang-sheng for Stranger Eyes	Yang Kuei-mei for Yen and Ai-Lee	Alisia Liang for The Chronicles of Libidoists

== Outstanding Artistic Contribution awards ==
Year	Music	Editing	Cinematography	Sound Design	Art Direction	Visual Effects
1998	—	—	—	—	Huang Wen-ying for Flowers of Shanghai	—
1999	—	—	—	—	—	—
2000	—	—	—	—	—	—
2001 (not held)	—	—	—	—	—	—
2002	—	—	—	—	Tang Shu-fen, Jyu Zih and Jiang Wun-cih for A Garden in the Sky	—
2003	—	—	—	Nail	—	Dreams Are Floating
2004	—	—	—	—	—	—
2005	—	—	—	—	—	—
2006	—	—	—	—	—	—
2007	—	—	—	—	—	—
2008	Lu Sheng-fei and Luo Chii for Cape No. 7	—	Chin Ding-Chang for Cape No.7	—	Weng Kuei-pang for Orz Boyz	—
2009	Lim Giong for Yang Yang	William Chang for Miao Miao	Kwan Pun Leung for Miao Miao	—	Huang Mei-chin for A Place of One's Own	—
2010	Summer Lei and Ho Zhi-jian for Taipei Exchanges	Kwan Pun-leung and Hsu Hung-yuan for Let The Wind Carry Me	Liao Peng-jung for Face	—	Huang Mei-chin and Chen Po-jen for Monga	—
2011	Chang Wu-wu for Honey Pupu	Lin Wei-chih and Ko Meng-rong for My Buddies	Fisher Yu for Honey Pupu	—	Tseng Chia-chi for Libangbang	—
2012	Soler for Young Dudes	Adong Chen and Chiang Yi-ning for Cha Cha for Twins	Patrick Chow for Young Dudes	—	—	Xiao Yang, Chang Song, A Law, Li Ming-hsung, Li Jin-hui for Starry Starry Night
2013	Tseng Si-ming for Soul	Huang Kuan-Chun for A Rolling Stone	Nagao Nakashima for Soul	—	—	—
2014	—	Hung Chun-hsiu for The Lost Sea	Yao Hung-i for Pusu Qhuni	—	Huang Mei-ching for Zone Pro Site	Chen Ming-ho for Rock Rabbit
2015	—	Xu Wei-yao for A Life That Sings	Chen Hyin-gen and Chang Hao-jan for A Life That Sings	—	Huang Mei-ching for Paradise in Service	—
2016	Lim Giong for City of Jade	Kenji Chen for Hang in There, Kids!	Zhao Fei for The Left Ear	Huang Ya-li and Yannick Dauby for Le Moulin	—	—
2017	Lin Sheng-xiang for The Great Buddha +	Lai Hsiu-hsiung for The Great Buddha +	Yao Hung-i for Missing Johnny	—	Chao Shih-hao for The Great Buddha +	—
2018	Chris Ho, Summer Lei for Father to Son	Chen Chun-hong for The Bold, the Corrupt, and the Beautiful	Chung Mong-Hong for Xiao Mei	—	Hwang Wen-ying, Wang Chih-cheng for Father to Son	—

=== Outstanding Contribution Award ===
Year	Recipient
2010	—
2011	Alphonse Perroquet / Parrot Caille / Quail Youth-Leigh
2012	Tsao Yuan-feng
2012	Funscreen Weekly
2013	Peggy Chiao
2014	Jiing Yng-ruey
2015	Ko I-chen
2016	Taipei Documentary Filmmakers' Union
2017	Jan Hung-tze
2018	Chen Kuo-fu

=== Other prizes ===
==== Lifetime Achievement Award ====
Year	Recipient
2009	Li Hsing
2009	Ming Chi
2010	Ko Hsiang-ting
2010	Wen Ying

==== Best Individual Achievement ====
Year	Recipient
2003	Li Jing-huei for The Ballads of Grandmothers

==== Special Mention, Actress ====
Year	Recipient
2008	Mei Fang for Orz Boyz and Summer of Magic

==== Special Grand Award of the Year ====
Year	Recipient
1999	Mickey Chen for Boys for Beauty

==== Special Jury Award ====
Year	Recipient
1998	Tsai Ming-liang for The Hole
1999	Darkness and Light (cast of non-professional actors)
2000	The Cabbie
2008	Tom Lin Shu-yu for Winds of September
2009	Cheng Yu-Chieh for Yang Yang
2015	Huang Da-wang for TPE-Tics

==== Special Mention ====
Year	Recipient
2004	Chen Shang-po for Flyway
2004	Chen Lung-nan for Ocean Fever
2004	Wu Mi-sen for Experimental Taiwanese
2004	Tsai Yi-feng for To See or Not to See
2005	Chou I-wen for Go Out to Sea
2005	Wang Hsiu-ling and Lo Shin-chieh for Plan of Regeneration
2005	Pan Hsin-ping for Small and Deep, Love Stories
2005	Chen Po-wen for Grandpa's Mountain Ballad
2005	Lin Yu-hsien for Jump! Boys
2006	Huang Shu-mei for An Encounter with Chungliao
2006	Ho Wi-ding for Respire
2006	Kuo Liang-yin for SHONENKO: The Untold Stories of Taiwanese Child Laborers in WWII
2006	Jake Pollock (photographer)
2007	Lin Ching-chieh for The Most Distant Course and Street Survivor
2007	Tang Wei-hsuan and Chang Keng-hua (art designers) for The Wall-Passer
2007	En Chen (photographer) for Island Etude
2007	Sean Kao for A Starry Silent Night and The Soul of Bread
2007	Lin Shih-yung for Woodman 2: BBS Fighting

==== Industry Award for Narrative Feature ====
Year	Recipient
2010	Ho Wi Ding for Pinoy Sunday

==== Non-Narrative Feature, Jury Prize ====
Year	Recipient
2009	Chiang Hsiu-chiung for Hopscotch

==== Best Experimental Film ====
Year	Recipient
2003	Wu Jyun-huei and Sin Jian-zong for Sentimental Journey
2003	Siao Li-siou for Copy : Copy
2004	Wu Chun-hui for Noah Noah
2006	Tzou Nien-tsu for One Less American
2007	Chang Hao-chuan for Follow Me, Please

==== Documentary Special Prize ====
Year	Recipient
2002	Chen Lung-nan for The Lost Two Years
2007	Huang Shu-mei for Formosa Dream, Disrupted
2008	Ho Chao-ti for El Salvador Journal
2009	Chou Yu-hsin, Han Chung-han, Wang Chen-yu for Teen Patron

==== Creative Genre Film Award ====
Year	Recipient
2003	PaPa Blue

==== Best Fictional Film-Video Award ====
Year	Recipient
2002	Summer, Dream

==== Best Animated Film-Video Award ====
Year	Recipient
2002	The Toilet Republic

==== Industry Award for Short ====
Year	Recipient
2010	Cheng Wei-hao for Real Sniper

==== Narrative Short – Jury Special Award ====
Year	Recipient
2008	DJ Chen for My Superpower Girl

==== Best Animation Short ====
Year	Recipient
2008	Jack Shih for Fly Out Blue
2009	Lu Wen-chung for Ketchup

==== Animation Short – Special Mention ====
Year	Recipient
2008	Christy Chang for Fuji Shogun

==== Audience's Choice Award (2nd and 3rd place) ====
Year	Recipient
2007	Eternal Summer (2nd)
2007	Formosa Dream, Disrupted (3rd)

==== Best Animation Directors Award ====
Year	Recipient
2002	Chiou Yu-feng for Travel
2002	Jimmy Feng for Mystery Series

==== Pro-Film Industry Award, Promising Talent Award ====
Year	Recipient
2009	Doze Niu for Monga

==== Most Promising Director of the Year ====
Year	Recipient
1999	Lin Jing-jie for Bad Girl Trilogy
2002	Hsiao Ya-chuan for Mirror Image
2002	Chen Yi-hsiung for Sunny Doll

==== Dedicative Independent Documentary Filmmaker Award ====
Year	Recipient
2002	Lo Shin-chieh for Love It More Than I Can Say

==== Independent Spirit Award of the Year ====
Year	Recipient
2000	Lament of the Sand River

==== Best Technical Achievements ====
Year	Recipient
2013	Patrick Chou, Tu Dun-chih, Wenders Li, Chiang Yi-ning, Owen Wwang, Penny Tsai, Wei Hsiang-jung, Chau Chi-shing, Chas, Chan Chi-ho, Johnny Lin, Shaun Su for When a Wolf Falls in Love with a Sheep

==== Award of Outstanding Technique of the Year ====
Year	Recipient
2000	Legend of the Sacred Stone

==== Best Documentary Photography ====
Year	Recipient
2003	Carry the Paramount of Jade Mountain on My Back
