= Bojie =

Bojie may refer to:

- Cai Yong, courtesy name Bojie, 2nd century Chinese astronomer, calligrapher and writer
- Wang Po-chieh (born 1989), Taiwanese actor
- Bojie Dy (Faustino De Guzman Dy III, born 1961), Filipino politician
