= Yeh Yung-chih incident =

Controversial 2000 death in Taiwan

The Yeh Yung-chih incident was a campus incident involving sexual diversity issues in Taiwan. Yeh Yung-chih (葉永鋕), a third-grade student of Gao-Shu Junior High School in Gaoshu Village, Gaoshu Township, Pingtung County, was bullied by some classmates because of his gender nonconformity. On April 20, 2000, at 11:42, Yeh left the classroom early to go to the bathroom. He was later found seriously injured and lying in a pool of his own blood. He later died at a local hospital. This incident incited a discussion about gender education in Taiwanese society, which led to the revision of the original "Both Genders Equality Education Act" to "Gender Equity Education Act" in 2004. The education policy was also altered from a traditional view of sex into a more universal gender equality education system.

== Background ==
According to Yeh Yung-chih's mother, Chen Chun-ju, Yeh was “too feminine” since he was a child and liked “playing make-believe”. In junior school, he was bullied by his classmates for those reasons. For example, his pants were forcibly taken off by several students in junior high school. Although this incident was reported to the school, the situation did not improve. According to the investigation, Yeh could only use the toilet safely while avoiding others if possible.

== Incident ==
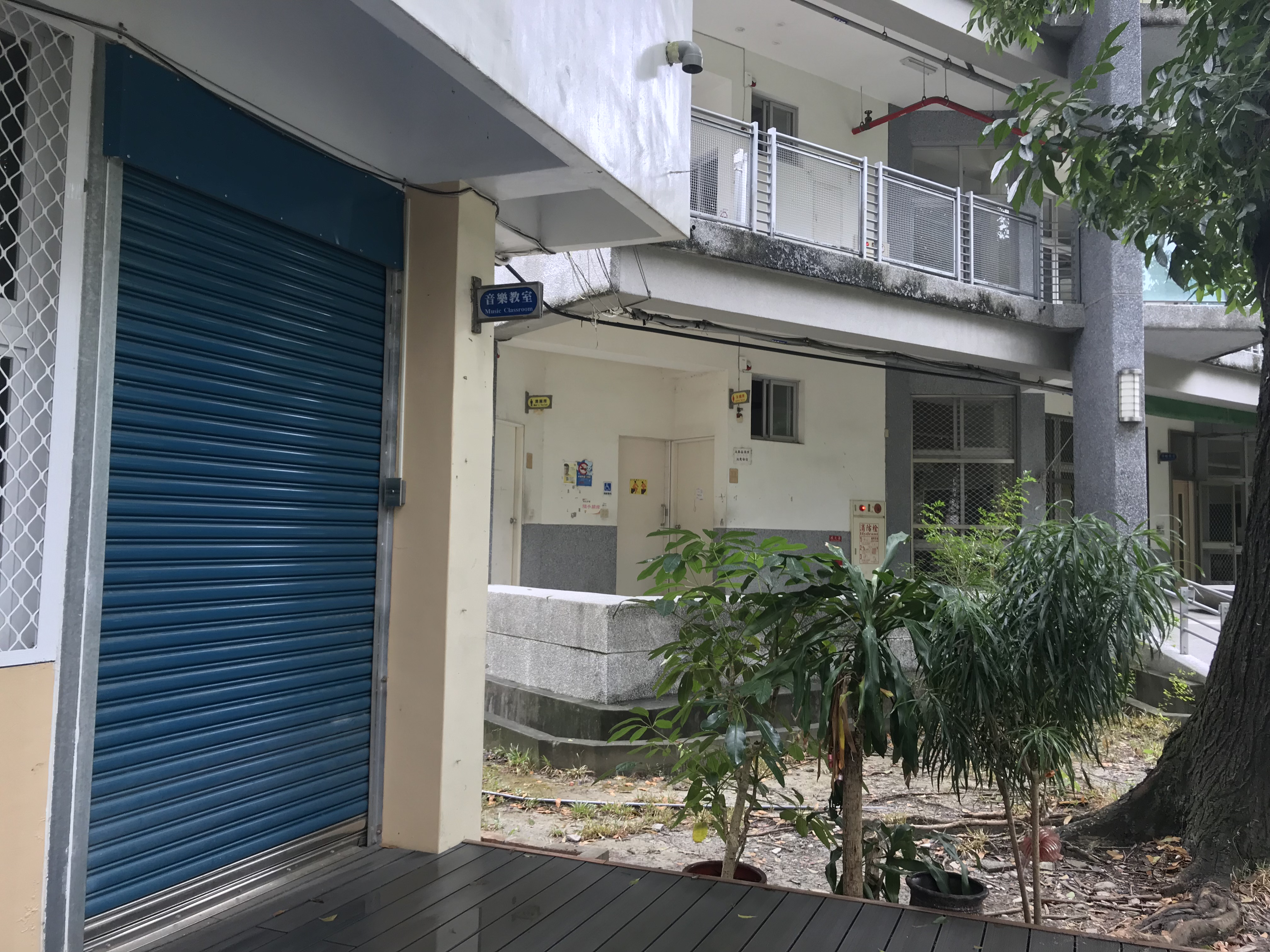
Music classroom and toilets in the present-day campus. According to a member of Humanistic Education Foundation participating in the investigation, this toilet was blocked to prevent students from smoking, forcing Yeh to pass through woods to reach the nearest toilet hundred meters away.

At 11:42 am on April 20, 2000, Yeh Yung-chih raised his hand during the fourth music class to express his need to use the bathroom. The teacher consented and Yeh left the classroom. Yeh did not return and was later found by other students in the men's room, meters away from the music classroom. His head and nose were bleeding. The zipper of his pants was open. He could only make a faint sound and tried to crawl away. The student who found Yeh immediately notified the school and took him to the health room. After treatment from the nurse, he was sent to the local Tung-Ching Hospital (now Da-Sin Hospital), and he was later transferred to Pingtung Christian Hospital. Yeh suffered severe intracranial injuries and remained in a coma. He was pronounced dead at 4:45 am the next day.

== Cause of death ==
On June 10, 2000, the autopsy certificate from the Institute of Forensic Medicine of the Ministry of Justice concluded that Yeh Yongyun had no protective abrasions on his body. During the autopsy, it was found that Yeh had high-grade tracheal pneumonia. Therefore, it was determined that Yeh lost consciousness in the toilet, which caused him to fall and fracture his skull. It was believed that it was his own disease that caused the fainting.

In 2001, the Kaohsiung Branch of the High Court of Taiwan issued a hypothetical question to the affiliated hospital of the National Taiwan University School of Medicine, asking whether high-grade tracheal pneumonia would cause patients to faint. The hospital responded in a letter stating that "bronchial pneumonia" in general should not cause fainting unless it is compounded by pre-existing conditions.

On September 6, 2005, the Medical Review Committee of the Executive Yuan Department of Health found that Yeh had tracheal pneumonia and cardiomyopathy during autopsy. Therefore, he may still have had temporary loss of consciousness due to sudden cardiac death. Intracranial hemorrhage occurred during the impact. Moreover, the deceased's brother confessed that Yeh had fainted at home while going to the toilet at night. The possibility of an existing heart or brain condition being involved cannot be ruled out.

== Judicial proceedings ==
In June 2000, Prosecutor Chiang Chung-i of the Prosecutors Office of the Pingtung District Court filed a public prosecution against Gao-Shu Junior High School President Lin Sheng-li, General Affairs Director Lin Chih-hui, and General Affairs Team Leader Li Bao-shu for the crime of negligence leading to death.

On January 19, 2001, the Pingtung District Court acquitted the principal and the other three persons based on the forensic medical examination report.

On August 21, 2001, the Kaohsiung Branch of the Taiwan High Court found that the prosecutor's appeal was unreasonable and upheld the verdict of not guilty in the first instance.

On July 23, 2004, the Supreme Court of Taiwan held that the forensic doctor's appraisal report did not appear to be the same as the response letter from the National Taiwan University School of Medicine. The original trial did not ask other medical institutions for appraisal, and Yeh Yongrong was then suspected of fainting on his own due to illness. The original judgment was revoked and sent back to the Kaohsiung Branch of the Taiwan High Court.

On October 31, 2005, the Kaohsiung Branch of the High Court of Taiwan rejected the prosecutor's appeal by dismissing the prosecutor's appeal based on the appraisal of the Medical Review Committee of the Department of Health of the Executive Yuan.

On May 11, 2006, the Supreme Court of Taiwan used the second-instance court and the Executive Yuan Department of Health Medical Affairs Review Committee appraisal to be unable to rule out a possibility of fainting. Failure to state the reasons for the selection and determination of the evidence in the reasons, the original judgment was revoked and sent back to the Kaohsiung Branch of the Taiwan High Court.

On September 12, 2006, the Kaohsiung Branch of the High Court of Taiwan concluded an appeal. It was determined that the deceased was eager to return to the classroom after urinating. He slipped on the wet floor when he walked down the steps. His center of gravity was suddenly thrown out of balance and caused him to faint and fall to the ground. At that time, his head hit the ground and he died, and the water on the ground was absorbed by the deceased's clothing. The principal, general affairs director, general affairs team leader and other administrative directors of Gaoshu Junior High School were judged to be negligent in repairing the school's water tank. In order to protect the personal safety of the students while at school, the principal, general affairs director, and general affairs team leader were sentenced to five months, four months, and three months imprisonment respectively. This case was decided in accordance with the first paragraph of Article 376 of the Criminal Procedure Law, which cannot be appealed at the third instance.

== Influence and controversy ==
In Taiwan, Yeh Yung-chih is known as the rose boy, after the Chinese translation of the 1997 French film Ma vie en rose.

Views of Yeh Yung-chih's death vary based on the testimony of various parties and unconfirmed speculation. Some people believe that the incident was caused by the school's failure to respect Yen's gender nonconformity and teach progressive values.

Soon after the incident, the Ministry of Education formed an investigation team composed of members of the Gender Equality Education Committee; Ji Hui-jung, Wang Li-jung, Su Chien-ling, Bi Heng-ta, and others. After recording the incident and follow-up actions, they called on the Ministry of Education to pay attention to gender issues on campus in the report.

In October 2000, the Ministry of Education launched the "New Campus Campaign: Anti-Gender Violence" campaign, emphasizing that in addition to respecting gender conforming men and women, people of different sexual orientations and gender identities should also be respected, and stereotyping should be eliminated.

On December 16, 2000, Taiwan's Ministry of Education announced that the “Gender Equality Education Committee” was renamed to the “Gender Equality Education Committee”, and the education policy was extended to include more inclusive policy.

In 2000, the gay documentary director Mickey Chen planned to shoot Yeh Yung-chih's documentary.

In 2001, the theme of the Ministry of Education's promotion of gender education was set as "multiple genders" and "campus safety".

In 2004, the "Gender Equity Education Act" was created in order to give more attention to educational content about sexual orientation, gender characteristics, and gender identity.

In 2006, the Taiwan Gender Equality Education Association published Give Rose Boy a Hug to record the Yeh Yung-chih incident and explore its implications.

In 2007, the Taiwan's Ministry of Education filmed the documentary En Rose. In 2009, En Rose was released and used at high schools nationwide as teaching materials. On November 7, 2015, the documentary short film We Are All Different, Yet the Same (Story of Yeh Yung-chih) directed by Taiwanese director Hou Chi-jan was played during Taiwanese singer Jolin Tsai’s "Play World Tour" in different cities. Tsai called on the public to pay attention to the issue of gender bullying in schools.

On December 26, 2018, Tsai included the song "Womxnly" (玫瑰少年) on her 14th studio album Ugly Beauty in memory of Yeh Yung-chih. The song won the Song of the Year award at the 30th Golden Melody Awards in the following year.

21 years after the death of Yeh Yung-chih, his school, Gao Shu Junior High, installed a series of metal wall decorations depicting roses and trees, in commemoration. These were placed at the male student toilets and symbolize that regardless of gender, “a person can be as beautiful and gentle as a rose, and as strong and steadfast as a tree”.

The government designated 20 April 2022 as the first Gender Equality Education Day.
