= Golden Horse Award for Best Supporting Actress =

Taiwanese film award

- Awarded for: Best Performance by an Actress in a Supporting Role
- Country: Taiwan
- Presented by: Taipei Golden Horse Film Festival Executive Committee
- First award: 1962
- Currently held by: Vera Chen for The Waves Will Carry Us (2025)
- Website: goldenhorse.org.tw

The Golden Horse Award for Best Supporting Actress (Chinese: 金馬獎最佳女配角) is presented annually at Taiwan's Golden Horse Film Awards.

== Winners and nominees ==
indicates the winner

=== 1960s ===
Year	Recipient(s)	Film	Original title
1962 (1st)	Tang Pao-yun	Typhoon	颱風
1963 (2nd)	Margaret Tu	Wu Shan Chun Hui	巫山春回
1965 (3rd)	Wang Lai	Ren Zhi Chu	人之初
1966 (4th)	Lu Pi-yun	The Rain of Sorrow	煙雨濛濛
1967 (5th)	Angela Yu	The Blue and the Black	藍與黑
1968 (6th)	Ouyang Sha-fei	Too Late for Love	烽火萬里情
1969 (7th)	Chang Ping-yu	Spring in a Small Town	小鎮春回

=== 1970s ===
Year	Recipient(s)	Film	Original title
1970 (8th)	Hsia Tai-feng	Ge Sheng Mei Ying	歌聲魅影
1971 (9th)	Sally Chen	The Ammunition Hunters	落鷹峽
1972 (10th)	Fu Pi-hui	Execution in Autumn	秋決
1973 (11th)	Lisa Lu	The 14 Amazons	十四女英豪
1975 (12th)	Josephine Siao	Girl Friend	女朋友
1976 (13th)	Sylvia Chang	Posterity and Perplexity	碧雲天
1977 (14th)	Terry Hu	Far Away from Home	人在天涯
1978 (15th)	Gua Ah-leh	The Diary of Di-Di	蒂蒂日記
1978 (15th)	Lisa Lu	Everlasting Love	永恆的愛
1978 (15th)	Chin Chi-min	Love of the White Snake	真白蛇傳
1979 (16th)	Shen Shih-hua	Fly Up with Love	一個女工的故事
1979 (16th)	Terry Hu	Rainbow in My Heart	第二道彩虹
1979 (16th)	Gua Ah-leh	Love in Chilly Spring	春寒

=== 1980s ===
Year	Recipient(s)	Film	Original title
1980 (17th)	Shao Pei-ling	White Jasmine	茉莉花
1980 (17th)	Chen Chiu-yen	Wo Ta Lang Er Lai	我踏浪而來
1980 (17th)	Yang Jo-lan	To You with Love	候鳥之愛
1981 (18th)	Wang Lai	The Unsinkable Miss Calabash	小葫蘆
1981 (18th)	Wu Su-chu	Sailing for Tomorrow	明天只有我
1981 (18th)	Gua Ah-leh	The Story of Daniel	丹尼爾的故事
1982 (19th)	Deanie Ip	Cream, Soda and Milk	奶油溝鮮奶
1982 (19th)	Jue Sing-choi	Cream, Soda and Milk	奶油溝鮮奶
1982 (19th)	Shih An-ni	In Our Time	光陰的故事
1983 (20th)	Ying Ying	A Flower in the Raining Night	看海的日子
1983 (20th)	Li Tai-ling	Send in the Clowns	臺上臺下
1983 (20th)	Chiang Hsia	Papa, Can You Hear Me Sing	搭錯車
1984 (21st)	Chen Chiu-yen	Ah Fei	油麻菜籽
1984 (21st)	Lam Hoi-ling	An Amorous Woman of Tang Dynasty	唐朝豪放女
1984 (21st)	Cheng Hsiu-ying	Teenage Fugitive	小逃犯
1985 (22nd)	Tang Ruyun	The Time to Live and the Time to Die	童年往事
1985 (22nd)	Chan Yuen-lai	Hong Kong Graffiti	女人風情話
1985 (22nd)	Deanie Ip	My Name Ain't Suzie	夢鎖香江
1986 (23rd)	Cora Miao	Passion	最愛
1986 (23rd)	Lisa Chiao Chiao	Why Me?	何必有我
1986 (23rd)	Li Tai-ling	Crystal Boys	孽子
1987 (24th)	Lin Shan-yu	Be My Lovely Child Again	期待你長大
1987 (24th)	Lin Hsiu-ling	Osmanthus Alley	桂花巷
1987 (24th)	Wen Ying	Strawman	稻草人
1988 (25th)	Wang Lai	The Third Bridge	海峽兩岸
1988 (25th)	Chang Ying-chen	Rouge of the North	怨女
1988 (25th)	Elaine Jin	People's Hero	銀行風雲
1989 (26th)	Lee Shu-chen	The Dull Ice Flower	魯冰花
1989 (26th)	Wong Siu-fung	Deception	驚魂記
1989 (26th)	Chan Cheuk-yan	Wild Search	伴我闖天涯

=== 1990s ===
Year	Recipient(s)	Film	Original title
1990 (27th)	Maggie Cheung	Red Dust	滾滾紅塵
1990 (27th)	Shaw Tswe-fen	The Man from Island West	西部來的人
1990 (27th)	Lau Yuk-chui	Queen of Temple Street	後街人生
1990 (27th)	Siqin Gaowa	A Woman and Seven Husbands	販母案考
1991 (28th)	Rebecca Pan	Days of Being Wild	阿飛正傳
1991 (28th)	Wang Lai	Pushing Hands	推手
1991 (28th)	Elaine Jin	A Brighter Summer Day	牯嶺街少年殺人事件
1991 (28th)	Chiang Hsiu-chiung	A Brighter Summer Day	牯嶺街少年殺人事件
1992 (29th)	Josephine Koo	To Liv(e)	浮世戀曲
1992 (29th)	May Lo	Girls Without Tomorrow 1992	現代應召女郎
1992 (29th)	Wen Ying	Hill of No Return	無言的山丘
1992 (29th)	Chen Hsien-mei	Hill of No Return	無言的山丘
1993 (30th)	Gua Ah-leh	The Wedding Banquet	喜宴
1993 (30th)	Fung Bo Bo	C'est la vie, mon chéri	新不了情
1993 (30th)	Deanie Ip	Murder	危險枕邊人
1993 (30th)	Yang Chieh-mei	Five Girls and a Rope	五個女子和一根繩子
1994 (31st)	Elaine Jin	A Confucian Confusion	獨立時代
1994 (31st)	Gua Ah-leh	Eat Drink Man Woman	飲食男女
1994 (31st)	Cheung Yui-ling	Twenty Something	晚九朝五
1994 (31st)	Law Koon-lan	Over the Rainbow, Under the Skirt	記得香蕉成熟時II之初戀情人
1995 (32nd)	Wen Ying	Tropical Fish	熱帶魚
1995 (32nd)	Law Koon-lan	Summer Snow	女人四十
1995 (32nd)	Chu Hui-chen	Formosa Sisters	流浪舞台
1995 (32nd)	Sue Ming-ming	Super Citizen Ko	超級大國民
1996 (33rd)	Chiu Hsiu-min	Ah Chung	忠仔
1996 (33rd)	Liu On-lai	Floating Life	浮生
1996 (33rd)	Cecilia Lee	Floating Life	浮生
1996 (33rd)	Shu Qi	Viva Erotica	色情男女
1997 (34th)	Jane Liao	Love Go Go	愛情來了
1997 (34th)	Tang Mei-yun	Such a Life!	一隻鳥仔哮啾啾
1997 (34th)	Theresa Lee	Intimates	自梳
1997 (34th)	Lu Yi-ching	The River	河流
1998 (35th)	Shu Qi	Portland Street Blues	洪興十三妹
1998 (35th)	Kwan Sau-mei	Your Place or Mine!	每天愛你八小時
1998 (35th)	Amanda Lee	9413	
1998 (35th)	Tsai Tsan-te	Bad Girl Trilogy	惡女列傳
1999 (36th)	Deanie Ip	Crying Heart	笨小孩
1999 (36th)	Elaine Jin	Tempting Heart	心動
1999 (36th)	Wang Yueh	Woman Soup	女湯
1999 (36th)	Josie Ho	Purple Storm	紫雨風暴

=== 2000s ===
Year	Recipient(s)	Film	Original title
2000 (37th)	Chao Mei-ling	Lament of the Sand River	沙河悲歌
2000 (37th)	Cheng Hsiu-ying	The Cabbie	運轉手之戀
2000 (37th)	Hsiao Shu-chen	Pure Accidents	純屬意外
2000 (37th)	Teresa Mo	And I Hate You So	小親親
2001 (38th)	Lo Wai-ying	Gimme, Gimme	愛上我吧
2001 (38th)	Risa Junna	Midnight Fly	慌心假期
2001 (38th)	Lu Yi-ching	What Time Is It There?	你那邊幾點
2001 (38th)	Li Hsiu	Summer, Dream	石碇的夏天
2002 (39th)	Karena Lam	July Rhapsody	男人四十
2002 (39th)	Yang Kuei-mei	Crusoe's Robinson	魯賓遜漂流記
2002 (39th)	Wu Wai-man	Hollywood Hong Kong	香港有個荷里活
2002 (39th)	Zhao Wei	Chinese Odyssey 2002	天下無雙
2003 (40th)	Lin Mei-hsiu	Comes the Black Dog	黑狗來了
2003 (40th)	Kara Wai	Night Corridor	妖夜迴廊
2003 (40th)	Candy Lo	Truth or Dare: 6th Floor Rear Flat	六樓后座
2003 (40th)	Terri Kwan	Turn Left, Turn Right	向左走‧向右走
2004 (41st)	Bai Ling	Dumplings	餃子．三更2之一
2004 (41st)	Kate Yeung	20 30 40	
2004 (41st)	Angelica Lee	20 30 40	
2004 (41st)	Eugenia Yuan	The Eye 2	見鬼2
2005 (42nd)	Yuen Qiu	Kung Fu Hustle	功夫
2005 (42nd)	Teresa Mo	2 Young	早熟
2005 (42nd)	Hsiao Shu-shen	Love's Lone Flower	青春蝴蝶孤戀花
2005 (42nd)	Lu Yi-ching	Blue Cha Cha	深海
2006 (43rd)	Hsieh Hsin-ying	Reflections	愛麗絲的鏡子
2006 (43rd)	Amy Chum	My Mother Is a Belly Dancer	師奶唔易做
2006 (43rd)	Zhao Wei	The Postmodern Life of My Aunt	姨媽的後現代生活
2007 (44th)	Fan Bingbing	The Matrimony	心中有鬼
2007 (44th)	Alice Tzeng	Secret	不能說的‧祕密
2007 (44th)	Maggie Shiu	Eye in the Sky	跟蹤
2007 (44th)	Janine Chang	What on Earth Have I Done Wrong?!	情非得已之生存之道
2008 (45th)	Mei Fang	Orz Boyz!	囧男孩
2008 (45th)	Nora Miao	Run Papa Run	一個好爸爸
2008 (45th)	Lai Meng	Money No Enough 2	錢不夠用2
2008 (45th)	Wu Li-chi	Detours to Paradise	歧路天堂
2009 (46th)	Kara Wai	At the End of Daybreak	心魔
2009 (46th)	Liu Yin-shang	Sleeping With Her	片刻暖和
2009 (46th)	Lu Yi-ching	A Place of One's Own	一席之地
2009 (46th)	Zhang Ziyi	Forever Enthralled	梅蘭芳

=== 2010s ===
Year	Recipient(s)	Film	Original title
2010 (47th)	Hao Lei	The Fourth Portrait	第四張畫
2010 (47th)	Winnie Chang	Seven Days in Heaven	父後七日
2010 (47th)	Lü Hsueh-feng	When Love Comes	當愛來的時候
2010 (47th)	Zhang Jingchu	Aftershock	唐山大地震
2011 (48th)	Tang Qun	Return Ticket	到阜陽六百里
2011 (48th)	Kara Wai	A Chinese Ghost Story	倩女幽魂
2011 (48th)	Jiang Wenli	Love for Life	最爱
2011 (48th)	Carina Lau	Let the Bullets Fly	让子弹飞
2012 (49th)	Liang Jing	Design of Death	杀生
2012 (49th)	Amber Kuo	Love	愛
2012 (49th)	Ivy Chen	Love	愛
2012 (49th)	Mavis Fan	The Silent War	聽風者
2012 (49th)	Dada Chan	Vulgaria	低俗喜劇
2013 (50th)	Yeo Yann Yann	Ilo Ilo	爸媽不在家
2013 (50th)	Lee Xin Qiao	Unbeatable	激戰
2013 (50th)	Siu Yam-yam	Tales from the Dark 1	李碧華鬼魅系列:迷離夜
2013 (50th)	Lin Mei-hsiu	To My Dear Granny	親愛的奶奶
2013 (50th)	Xue Hong	Longing for the Rain	春夢
2014 (51st)	Wan Qian	Paradise in Service	軍中樂園
2014 (51st)	Ivy Chen	Paradise in Service	軍中樂園
2014 (51st)	Hao Lei	The Golden Era	黃金時代
2014 (51st)	Paw Hee-ching	Insanity	暴瘋語
2014 (51st)	Lang Tsu-yun	Sweet Alibis	甜蜜殺機
2015 (52nd)	Lü Hsueh-feng	Thanatos, Drunk	醉‧生夢死
2015 (52nd)	Elaine Jin	Port of Call	踏血尋梅
2015 (52nd)	Ma Sichun	The Left Ear	左耳
2015 (52nd)	Jian Man-shu	Maverick	菜鳥
2015 (52nd)	Jiang Wenli	The Master	師父
2016 (53rd)	Elaine Jin	Mad World	一念無明
2016 (53rd)	Sophia Li	The Tenants Downstairs	樓下的房客
2016 (53rd)	Liu Bei	Someone to Talk To	一句頂一萬句
2016 (53rd)	Lu Yi-ching	Forêt Debussy	德布西森林
2016 (53rd)	Wu Yanshu	Book of Love	北京遇上西雅圖之不二情書
2017 (54th)	Vicky Chen	The Bold, the Corrupt, and the Beautiful	血觀音
2017 (54th)	Wu Yanshu	Love Education	相愛相親
2017 (54th)	Chen Shiang-chyi	The Receptionist	接線員
2017 (54th)	Deanie Ip	Our Time Will Come	明月幾時有
2017 (54th)	Hsu Wei-ning	The Tag-Along 2	紅衣小女孩 2
2018 (55th)	Ding Ning	Cities of Last Things	幸福城市
2018 (55th)	Kara Wai	Tracey	翠絲
2018 (55th)	Xu Qing	Hidden Man	邪不压正
2018 (55th)	Zhang Zifeng	Last Letter	你好，之华
2018 (55th)	Phoebe Huang	Dad's Suit	老大人
2019 (56th)	Winnie Chang	The Teacher	我的靈魂是愛做的
2019 (56th)	Eleven Yao	The Gangs, the Oscars, and the Walking Dead	江湖無難事
2019 (56th)	Lu Yi-ching	3 Days 2 Nights	3天2夜
2019 (56th)	Patra Au	Suk Suk	叔·叔
2019 (56th)	Wen Chen-ling	A Sun	阳光普照

=== 2020s ===
Year	Recipient(s)	Film	Original title	Ref.
2020 (57th)	Chen Shu-fang	Dear Tenant	親愛的房客	
2020 (57th)	Francesca Kao	Get the Hell Out	逃出立法院	
2020 (57th)	Chang Ya-ling	Mickey On The Road	迷走廣州	
2020 (57th)	Hsieh Ying-xuan	Little Big Women	孤味	
2020 (57th)	Vera Chen	The Rope Curse 2	馗降：粽邪2	
2021 (58th)	Wang Yu-xuan	Goddamned Asura	該死的阿修羅	
2021 (58th)	Chung Hsin-ling	Man in Love	當男人戀愛時	
2021 (58th)	Loletta Lee	Drifting	濁水漂流	
2021 (58th)	Annie Chen	Terrorizers	青春弒戀	
2021 (58th)	Wen Chen-ling	Leave Me Alone	不想一個人	
2022 (59th)	Kagaw Piling	Gaga	哈勇家	
2022 (59th)	Jennifer Yu	Far Far Away	緣路山旮旯	
2022 (59th)	Caitlin Fang	The Post-Truth World	罪後真相	
2022 (59th)	Yang Li-yin	Coo-Coo 043	一家子兒咕咕叫	
2022 (59th)	Rimong Ihwar	Coo-Coo 043	一家子兒咕咕叫	
2023 (60th)	Beatrice Fang	Day Off	本日公休	
2023 (60th)	Eugenie Liu	Old Fox	老狐狸	
2023 (60th)	Ivy Chen	Trouble Girl	小曉	
2023 (60th)	Wanfang	Snow in Midsummer	五月雪	
2023 (60th)	Rachel Leung	In Broad Daylight	白日之下	
2024 (61st)	Yang Kuei-mei	Yen and Ai-Lee	小雁與吳愛麗	
2024 (61st)	Eugenie Liu	Daughter's Daughter	女兒的女兒	
2024 (61st)	Sandrine Pinna	Dead Talents Society	鬼才之道	
2024 (61st)	Pets Tseng	BIG		
2024 (61st)	Lu Yi-ching	Mongrel	白衣蒼狗	
2025 (62nd)	Vera Chen	The Waves Will Carry Us	人生海海	
2025 (62nd)	Janel Tsai	Left-Handed Girl	左撇子女孩	
2025 (62nd)	Nina Ye	Left-Handed Girl	左撇子女孩	
2025 (62nd)	Queena Huang	Family Matters	我家的事	
2025 (62nd)	Elizabeth Tang Tao	Girlfriends	女孩不平凡	

== Superlatives ==
Superlative	Actress	Record set
Oldest winner / nominee	Chen Shu-fang	81 years old (2020)
Youngest winner	Lin Shan-yu	10 years old (1987)
Youngest nominee	Chan Cheuk-yan	4 years old (1989)

== Multiple wins and nominations ==
The following individuals won two or more Golden Horse Awards for Best Supporting Actress:

Wins	Actress
4	Wang Lai
2	Elaine Jin
2	Gua Ah-leh
2	Deanie Ip

The following individuals received three or more Best Supporting Actress nominations:

Nominations	Actress
7	Lu Yi-ching
6	Elaine Jin
5	Gua Ah-leh
5	Deanie Ip
4	Wang Lai
4	Kara Wai
3	Wen Ying

== See also ==
- Academy Award for Best Supporting Actress
- Asian Film Award for Best Supporting Actress
- BAFTA Award for Best Actress in a Supporting Role
- Blue Dragon Film Award for Best Supporting Actress
- Hong Kong Film Award for Best Supporting Actress
- Japan Academy Film Prize for Outstanding Performance by an Actress in a Supporting Role
