= More Than Blue: The Series =

Taiwanese television series

- Chinese: 比悲傷更悲傷的故事：影集版
- Literal meaning: A Story Sadder than Sadness: The TV Series Version
- Hanyu Pinyin: Bǐ Bēishāng Gèng Bēishāng De Gùshì: Yǐngjí Bǎn
- Genre: Romance drama
- Based on: More Than Blue
- Written by: Hermes Lu; Emma Chen; Fei Kung-yii; Tsai Fang-yun
- Directed by: Hsieh Pei-ju
- Starring: Gingle Wang; Fandy Fan; Wang Po-chieh; Shao Yu-wei; Eleven Yao; Figaro Tseng
- Opening theme: "Beyond the Sea" by Accusefive
- Ending theme: "You Don't Belong to Me" by Eric Chou
- Composers: George Chen; Annie Lo; Sun Lin-chien; Tang Shih-ting; Thomas Chuang; Tomm Matthews
- Country of origin: Taiwan
- Original language: Mandarin
- No. of series: 1
- No. of episodes: 10

Production
- Executive producers: Chen Chi-yuan; Chuang Kuo-feng
- Producers: Melvin Ang; Rita Chuang; Gavin Lin; Icha Liu
- Cinematography: Randy Che
- Editor: Chiang Yi-ning
- Running time: 42-50 minutes
- Production companies: mm2 Entertainment; Good Movie

Original release
- Network: Netflix
- Release: 22 October 2021

More Than Blue: The Series (Chinese: 比悲傷更悲傷的故事：影集版) is a Taiwanese romance drama. It is an adaptation of the eponymous 2009 South Korean film More Than Blue and the Taiwanese remake More Than Blue. The series premiered on Netflix on October 22, 2021. It received 9 nominations at the 57th Golden Bell Awards and went on to win Best Directing for a Miniseries or Television Film for Hsieh Pei-ru and Best Supporting Actor in a Miniseries or Television Film for Bai Run-yin.

== Summary ==
Wang Bohan, a producer of E Shine Records, and his subordinate An Yiqi try to track down the copyright owner of a song. Wang Bohan knows that the composer, K, died of leukemia three years ago, and has heard that the lyricist Cream has also died. After learning that K gave some of his belongings to a photographer, Cindy, An Yiqi finds K's diary in Cindy's studio and learns the whole story.

K's father had leukemia, and his mother abandoned him because she could not bear the pressure of taking care of him and paying off the father's debts. When K was 16, his father killed three people in a car accident. The heavy sense of guilt and the huge pay-out made the family struggle. His father's condition worsened and he died. At the same time, K found out that he also had leukemia. Cream's parents and sister are the victims of K's father's car accident. She tried to get close to K to exact revenge, but discovered that K also lost his parents, like her. The two high school students gradually came to understand each other's grief, saw each other as their closest friend, and lived together like a family.

After graduating from college, K joined a record company and started composing music, with Cream as lyricist. Their work was appreciated by singer Bonie. Although K liked Cream, he knew that he would not live long due to his leukemia diagnosis, so he decided to hide his illness and try his best to play the role of a family member. He also introduced Cream to his dentist Yang Youxian, whose relationship with girlfriend Cindy was at a low point. K begged Cindy to let Yang Youxian go in exchange for being the model for her next creation. Cream and Yang Youxian fell in love and walked on the red carpet. Soon after, K died. Cream disappeared after holding his funeral.

Wang Bohan and Ady An resolve the copyright issue and learn the other half of the story.

While tracing the copyright, Wang Bohan discovers that An Yiqi was raising a son with congenital heart disease on her own. She devotes all her energy to taking care of the child, but in the end she still loses him. Bohan feels sorry for Yiqi; K and Cream's sacrifice for each other makes Bohan realize that love should not have to wait.

== Cast ==
=== Main ===
- Fandy Fan as Chang Che-kai (a.k.a. K), a composer
- Gingle Wang as Sung Yuan-yuan (a.k.a. Cream), a lyricist
- Wang Po-chieh as Wang Po-han, a music producer
- Shao Yu-wei as An Yi-chi (a.k.a. An-an), E SHINE's employee
- Eleven Yao as Yu Chen-hsi (a.k.a. Cindy), a photographer, Yu-hsien's girlfriend
- Figaro Tseng as Yang Yu-hsien, a dentist, Cindy's boyfriend

=== Recurring ===
- Ma Nien-hsien as Mr. Chi, the owner of Pop-Hit
- Tsai Jia-yin as Bonnie, a famous singer
- Bai Run-yin as An Ke-le, An-an's son
- Yuan Ai-fei as Huang Shu-hui (a.k.a. Kung Li-na), an actress, Po-han's ex-girlfriend
- Oscar Chiu as Oscar, E SHINE's employee, Po-han's assistant
- Wu Kun-da as Chang Kun-cheng, Che-kai's father
- Vera Chen as Cream's aunt
- Li Guan-yi as Pang, K's friend
- Wang Ke-yuan as Su Kuo-pei, Che-kai's friend
- Winnie Chang as Tseng Yu-hsia, Che-kai's mother
- Chiu Hao-chi as Lai Chun-chieh, Yi-chi's ex-boyfriend, Ke-le's bio father
- Lu Wen-hsueh as Yang Yao-lung, Yu-hsien's father
- Ahn Zhe as Jen Kuang, Cindy's ex-boyfriend

=== Special appearance ===
- A-Lin as herself, a famous singer
- Chen Yu as Chen Xian-an (a.k.a. Hsiao-kuai), Cindy's assistant

== Episodes ==
No.	Title	Original release date
1	"The Diary"	October 22, 2021
2	"Those Left Behind"	October 22, 2021
3	"K & Cream"	October 22, 2021
4	"Forever"	October 22, 2021
5	"For Your Happiness"	October 22, 2021
6	"Stranded Relationships"	October 22, 2021
7	"Variation"	October 22, 2021
8	"Cream & K"	October 22, 2021
9	"Disorientation"	October 22, 2021
10	"The Other Side of the Shore"	October 22, 2021
