= Forêt Debussy =

- Theatrical release poster
- Directed by: Kuo Cheng-chui
- Written by: Kuo Cheng-chui
- Produced by: Aileen Li; Steven Tu
- Starring: Gwei Lun-mei; Lu Yi-ching
- Cinematography: Antoine Héberlé
- Edited by: Nyssa Li; Yannis Polinacci
- Music by: Evgueni Galperine
- Production companies: 1 Production Film Company; You Love Agent & PR Executive; Filmagic Pictures
- Distributed by: Warner Bros. Pictures
- Release dates: 21 October 2016 (Kaohsiung Film Festival); 28 October 2016
- Running time: 94 minutes
- Country: Taiwan
- Language: Mandarin
- Budget: NT$10 million
- Box office: NT$1.3 million (Taipei)

Forêt Debussy (Chinese: 德布西森林) is a 2016 Taiwanese drama film written and directed by Kuo Cheng-chui. Starring Gwei Lun-mei and Lu Yi-ching, the film is about a mother who takes her daughter away from the city to the mountains to help her recover from a traumatic past.

Forêt Debussy world premiered at the 2016 Kaohsiung Film Festival, and was released in theaters on 28 October 2016.

The film's title refers to French composer Claude Debussy, whose compositions were notably inspired by nature.

== Premise ==
Far away from the city area in the mountains, a mother and a daughter live a simple and isolated life. The Daughter used to be a well-known pianist. After her husband and son were murdered for reasons relating to an influence-peddling case, The Daughter fell into despair and becomes indifferent to her surroundings. The Mother then decided to hide her daughter and herself deep in a forest where no one could ever find them, believing it is the only possible way for her daughter to heal herself and survive. However, despite living in seclusion, they can never escape from themselves. In the wilds, their journey has just begun.

== Cast ==
- Gwei Lun-mei as The Daughter
- Lu Yi-ching as The Mother

== Production ==
The film was partially financed through a production grant from the Ministry of Culture. Filming took place in the mountains of Alishan, Chiayi, Taiwan.

== Soundtrack ==
Forêt Debussy : Original Motion Picture Soundtrack

Soundtrack album by Various artists
- Released: 20 October 2016
- Genre: Film soundtrack
- Label: Seed Music

No.	Title	Performer	Length
1.	"Rêve (夢境)"	Cinéma-Orchestre de Paris	02:26
2.	"Sonata for Violin and Piano in G Minor 1st : Allegro Vivo (小提琴奏鳴曲：第一樂章)"	Hsu Shu-ting, Liao Chiao-han	06:02
3.	"Piano Trio in G Major 1st : Andantino con moto allegro (鋼琴三重奏：第一樂章)"	Yuyu Chu, Liao Chiao-han, Ou Yang Ling-yi	09:42
4.	"Piano Trio in G Major 2nd ： Scherzo Intermezzo (鋼琴三重奏：第二樂章)"	Yuyu Chu, Liao Chiao-han, Ou Yang Ling-yi	03:24
5.	"Golliwog's Cakewalk (黑娃娃步態舞)"	Various	00:58
6.	"Nuit (夜)"	Cinéma-Orchestre de Paris	02:05
7.	"String Quartet in G minor Op. 10, 1st ： Animé et très décidé (弦樂四重奏：第一樂章)"	Yuyu Chu, Liao Chiao-han, Ou Yang Ling-yi, Hsu Shu-ting	07:21
8.	"String Quartet n G minor Op. 10, 2nd ： Assez vif et bien rythmé (弦樂四重奏：第二樂章)"	Yuyu Chu, Liao Chiao-han, Ou Yang Ling-yi, Hsu Shu-ting	04:01
9.	"Feu / La mort (火和死神)"	Cinéma-Orchestre de Paris	02:58
10.	"Enterrement (葬禮)"	Cinéma-Orchestre de Paris	02:34
11.	"Clair de lune (月光)"	Anastasya Terenkova	05:20
12.	"Alone in the Forest 一個人的森林"	Koala Liu	03:56

== Awards and nominations ==
Award ceremony	Category	Recipients	Result
53rd Golden Horse Awards	Best Supporting Actress	Lu Yi-ching	Nominated
