= Eleven Yao =

Taiwanese actress (born 1986)

- 姚以緹
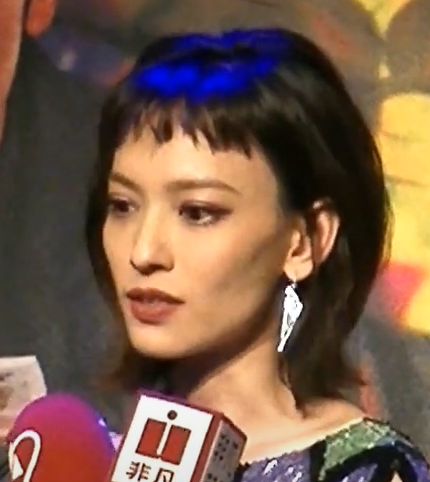
- Yao in September 2019
- Born: Yao Yi-ti; 25 February 1986 (age 40); Taitung City, Taiwan
- Education: Taipei Physical Education College
- Occupation: Actress
- Years active: 2006–present

Eleven Yao Yi-ti (Chinese: 姚以緹; born 25 February 1986) is a Taiwanese actress best known for her dual roles as Shanny and Hsiao Ching in the black comedy film The Gangs, the Oscars, and the Walking Dead (2019), for which she won Best Supporting Actress in the 22nd Taipei Film Awards. She went on to star in lead roles in the television series Code 2 (2019) and More Than Blue: The Series (2022), the latter earning her a nomination for Best Supporting Actress in the 57th Golden Bell Awards. Yao has also garnered recognition in Asia for her performances in the Japanese crime film Mr. Long (2017) and Korean action film Yaksha: Ruthless Operations (2022).

== Biography ==
Yao was born on 25 February 1986, in Taitung City, Taiwan. Her father is an Amis native. She attended and graduated from the Department of Ball Sports at Taipei Physical Education College, specializing in handball. Yao was elected as a reserve member of the national team and participated in several Asian tournaments. She was discovered by an agent, who was seeking new actors with a unique vibe, while playing basketball at TPEC in her freshman year. Yao began her acting career in 2006 while continuing her training as a handball player, initially considering acting as a hobby. She landed a major role in the 2007 Chinese Television System television series Daughter of the Sun. She became tired of the monotonous routine of sports training and developed a passion for performance, leading her to quit her athletic career and pursue acting when she was 20.

In 2014, Yao made her feature film debut as Chiao Chien-wei, a coolheaded military pilot, in the war film Dream Flight. She subsequently starred in leading roles in the 2015 television series Leo and the 2016 television movie The Cat in the Closet. Yao was also invited to star in the Japanese crime film Mr. Long alongside Chang Chen in 2016, an experience that deeply impacted her emotionally, as she found it challenging to detach from her character's emotions even two months after filming had ended. In 2018, Yao co-starred with Wu Kang-ren in the mystery film High Flash, and took on a leading role in the 2019 sci-fi thriller series Code 2.

In 2019, Yao garnered recognition for her performance in dual roles as Shanny, the spouse of a crime lord, and Hsiao Ching, an eccentric drag queen, in the black comedy film The Gangs, the Oscars, and the Walking Dead. She won Best Supporting Actress in the 22nd Taipei Film Awards, and received a nomination for Best Supporting Actress in the 56th Golden Horse Awards with her roles. She also appeared in the 2019 drama series Yong-Jiu Grocery Store, and took on a leading role in the 2020 drama series Amensalism. In 2021, Yao starred as Cindy Yu, a photographer engaged in a romantic relationship with a dentist played by Figaro Tseng, in the Netflix romance series More Than Blue: The Series. Her performance earned her a nomination for Best Supporting Actress in a Miniseries or Television Film in the 57th Golden Bell Awards. In 2022, Yao portrayed a Shenyang-based crime lord in the Korean action film Yaksha: Ruthless Operations. She also starred in the sci-fi film S–Girl, playing dual roles as a deceased mother and her AI clone, and took on triple roles in the anthology drama series Twisted Strings. Yao landed a main role in the 2023 drama series Trick or Love. In 2024, Yao starred in a lead role as Jessica, an underworld ghost diva alongside Sandrine Pinna, in the horror comedy film Dead Talents Society.

== Filmography ==
=== Film ===
Year	Title	Role	Notes/Ref.
2014	Dream Flight	Chiao Chien-wei (喬千惠)	
2017	Mr. Long	Lily	
2018	High Flash	Jin Min-Zhao (金敏照)	
2019	The Gangs, the Oscars, and the Walking Dead	Shanny/Hsiao Ching (香耐鵝/小青)	
2022	Yaksha: Ruthless Operations	Eleven	
2022	S–Girl	Tsai Yi-Chun (蔡宜君)	
2024	Dead Talents Society	Jessica (潔西卡)	
2026	96 Minutes	Yang Ting-juan (楊婷娟)	

=== Television ===
Year	Title	Role	Notes/Ref.
2007	Daughter of the Sun	Yumar (尤瑪)	Main role
2012	Man‧Boy	Hsia Hsiu-Min (夏秀敏)	Recurring role
2012	Gung Hay Fat Choy	Hsu An-lun (徐安倫)	Recurring role
2015	Leo	He Xin-jie (何心潔)	Main role
2016	Memory	Lei Lei (雷蕾)	Recurring role
2016	The Cat in the Closet	Fan Ching-Ching (范晴晴)	Television movie
2017	Magic Showdown	Lin Ming Jie (林明潔)	Main role
2017	The Last Verse	Yu Ting (雨婷)	Television movie
2019	Code 2	Lee Yuan (李媛)	Main role
2019	Yong-Jiu Grocery Store	A Wei (阿慧)	Guest role
2020	Amensalism	Xu Ming Fei (徐明菲)	Main role
2021	Danger Zone	Wu Yu-hsing (吳玉馨)	Guest role
2021	More Than Blue: The Series	Cindy Yu Chen-hsi (余晨曦)	Main role
2022	Women in Taipei	Ge An-he (郭安禾)	Guest role
2022	Twisted Strings	Limin/Su/Zian (莉敏/小蘇/子安)	Main role
2023	Trick or Love	Liang Jing-fen (梁靜雰)	Main role
2023	Living	Nao (奈緒)	Recurring role
2024	The Accidental Influencer	You Qian (游倩)	Recurring role
2024	Born for the Spotlight	Jie-mi (潔宓)	Special appearance

== Awards and nominations ==
Year	Award	Category	Work	Result	Ref.
2019	56th Golden Horse Awards	Best Supporting Actress	The Gangs, the Oscars, and the Walking Dead	Nominated	
2020	22nd Taipei Film Awards	Best Supporting Actress	The Gangs, the Oscars, and the Walking Dead	Won	
2022	57th Golden Bell Awards	Best Supporting Actress in a Miniseries or Television Film	More Than Blue: The Series	Nominated	
