= Golden Horse Lifetime Achievement Award =

Taiwanese film award

- Awarded for: Lifetime Achievement
- Location: Taiwan
- Presented by: Taipei Golden Horse Film Festival Executive Committee
- First award: 1993
- Currently held by: Chen Shu-fang (2025)
- Website: www.goldenhorse.org.tw

The Golden Horse Lifetime Achievement Award (Chinese: 金馬獎終身成就獎) is an award presented annually at the Golden Horse Awards by the Taipei Golden Horse Film Festival Executive Committee. The latest ceremony was held in 2025, with Chen Shu-fang receiving the honor.

== Recipients ==
Year	Ceremony	Recipient(s)
1993	30th	Wong Cheuk-hon (黃卓漢)
2019	56th	Wang Toon, Jimmy Wang
2023	60th	Brigitte Lin, Chen Kun-hou
2024	61st	Cheng Pei-pei, Lin Wen-chin
2025	62nd	Chen Shu-fang
