= Wang Lan (novelist) =

Taiwanese painter (1922–2003)

Wang Lan (Chinese: 王藍; 1922–2003) was a Taiwanese writer, artist and a National Assembly of the Republic of China deputy. He is famous for the novel The Blue and the Black, which is considered one of four major novels about the anti-Japanese war. In this novel, Lan "rewrites the political and historical period of the [Chinese] war against the Japanese, and the civil war between nationalists and the communists, by locating it firmly in the ideology of the fifties".

== See also ==
- Taiwanese art
