= Old Fox (film) =

2023 film by Hsiao Ya-chuan

- Theatrical release poster

Chinese name
- Chinese: 老狐狸
Transcriptions
Standard Mandarin
- Hanyu Pinyin: lǎo hú li
- Directed by: Hsiao Ya-chuan
- Written by: Hsiao Ya-chuan; Chan I-wen
- Produced by: Michael Wang
- Starring: Bai Run-yin; Liu Kuan-ting; Akio Chen; Eugenie Liu; Mugi Kadowaki; Jag Huang
- Cinematography: Lin Tse-chung
- Edited by: Chu-Chun Tao
- Music by: Chris Hou
- Production companies: BIT Production Co., Ltd.; Tomorrow Together Capital; Bossdom Digiinnovation Co., Ltd.; Toei Video Co., Ltd. (Japan); Angelic-Founder Co., Ltd.; Dream Mall Showtime Cinema Co., Ltd.; Sky Films Entertainment Co., Ltd.; Backer-Founder Co., Ltd.
- Distributed by: Sky Films Entertainment Co., Ltd.; Shine Time Entertainment Co., Ltd.
- Release dates: 27 October 2023 (Tokyo International Film Festival); 24 November 2023 (Taiwan)
- Running time: 112 minutes
- Countries: Taiwan; Japan
- Languages: Mandarin; Taiwanese

Old Fox (Chinese: 老狐狸, romanized: lǎo hú li) is a 2023 drama film directed by Hsiao Ya-chuan. The film follows a young boy who befriends his landlord, nicknamed Old Fox, and tells the story of Taiwan's rapidly changing society of the late 1980s. The cast includes Bai Run-yin, Liu Kuan-ting, Akio Chen, Mugi Kadowaki, and Eugenie Liu. The film is dedicated to the director's mother.

The film premiered on 27 October 2023 at the 36th Tokyo International Film Festival. It was released in Taiwan on 24 November 2023. At the 60th Golden Horse Awards, the film received seven nominations and won a leading four awards: Best Director, Best Original Film Score, Best Makeup & Costume Design and Best Supporting Actor (for Akio Chen). The film was chosen as the Taiwanese entry for the Best International Feature Film at the 97th Academy Awards, but was not nominated.

== Plot ==
In 1989, a time in which Taiwanese society is experiencing rapid change, Liao Tai-Lai is a single father who works in a restaurant. He and his 11-year-old son Liao Jie, the film's protagonist, live together in a rental house. They work hard to save money in the hope of buying a house of their own. Although socially disadvantaged, his father is a considerate man who is dedicated to his duties and strives to earn an honest living. Although buying a home is his father's goal, this hope creates a stronger driving force in his son Liao Jie.

One day by chance, the boy meets his landlord, Boss Xie, also known as the "Old Fox". A clever and cunning shopping mall tycoon, Boss Xie sees the reflection of his own past in the boy. He teaches the boy how to become a strong man and how to leverage inequality to succeed. A ruthless realist, Boss Xie's approach to life begins to influence the boy's mindset. How will Liao Jie, who suffers from frustration and bullying, let Old Fox's insightful comments affect his state of mind and behavior? For the boy, he was forced to grow up much more quickly than most of his peers. The figure he looked up to was always his hardworking father. Unexpectedly, the appearance of Boss Xie challenges his father.

The boy faces a choice between poverty and wealth, between the values of honesty and deceit. How will a boy who yearns to become stronger and long for wealth choose? Will they choose to be loyal to their conscience or bow to reality? This question divides the father and son into a conflict between the harsh realities of the world and the simplicity of its traditions.

The film presents a child's transformation from following the rules to gradually crossing the moral boundaries. As time unfolds, the audience sees Liao Jie's fear when he first met Boss Xie, to his later acceptance, and finally to his self-doubt and return to the values of his father.

== Cast ==
- Bai Run-yin as Liao Jie
- Liu Kuan-ting as Liao Tai-Lai
- Akio Chen as Boss Xie (Old Fox)
- Eugenie Liu as Lin Chen-Chen
- Mugi Kadowaki as Yang Jun-Mei
- Jag Huang
- James Wen

== Production ==
Old Fox was produced by BIT Production Co., Ltd. with Tomorrow Together Capital; Bossdom Digiinnovation Co., Ltd.; Toei Video Co., Ltd. (Japan); Angelic-Founder Co., Ltd.; Dream Mall Showtime Cinema Co., Ltd.; Sky Films Entertainment Co., Ltd.; Backer-Founder Co., Ltd. It was executive produced by Hou Hsiao-Hsien, Osaka Fumiko, and Elisa Y.H. Lin.

== Release ==
Old Fox was selected to be screened in the World Focus (Taiwan Cinema Renaissance) section at the 36th Tokyo International Film Festival, where the film had its world premiere on 27 October 2023. It was theatrically released in Taiwan on 24 November 2023.

== Accolades ==
Award	Date of ceremony	Category	Recipient(s)	Result	Ref.
Golden Horse Awards	25 November 2023	Best Director	Hsiao Ya-chuan	Won	
Golden Horse Awards	25 November 2023	Best Supporting Actor	Akio Chen	Won	
Golden Horse Awards	25 November 2023	Best Makeup & Costume Design	Wang Chih-cheng, Shirley Kao	Won	
Golden Horse Awards	25 November 2023	Best Original Film Score	Chris Hou	Won	
Golden Horse Awards	25 November 2023	Best Supporting Actress	Eugenie Liu	Nominated	
Golden Horse Awards	25 November 2023	Best Art Direction	Wang Chih-cheng, You Li-wen	Nominated	
Golden Horse Awards	25 November 2023	Best Original Film Song	"Fledgling", Composer: Chris Hou; Lyrics: Hsu Hui-ting; Performer: Power Station	Nominated	
Hong Kong Film Awards	27 April 2025	Best Asian Chinese Language Film	Old Fox	Won	
Taipei Film Awards	6 July 2024	Best Feature Film	Old Fox	Won	
Taipei Film Awards	6 July 2024	Best Director	Hsiao Ya-chuan	Won	
Taipei Film Awards	6 July 2024	Best Screenplay	Hsiao Ya-chuan and Chan I-wen	Won	
Taipei Film Awards	6 July 2024	Best Actor	Bai Run-yin	Nominated	
Taipei Film Awards	6 July 2024	Best Supporting Actress	Eugenie Liu	Nominated	
Taipei Film Awards	6 July 2024	Best Original Score	Chris Hou	Nominated	
Taipei Film Awards	6 July 2024	Best Cinematography	Lin Tse-chung	Won	
Taipei Film Awards	6 July 2024	Best Editing	Chu-Chun Tao	Nominated	
Taipei Film Awards	6 July 2024	Best Production Design	Wang Chih-Cheng and Li-Wen You	Nominated	
Taipei Film Awards	6 July 2024	Best Costume Design	Wang Chih-Cheng and Kao Hsien-Ling	Won	

== See also ==
- List of submissions to the 97th Academy Awards for Best International Feature Film
- List of Taiwanese submissions for the Academy Award for Best International Feature Film
