= Chang Kuo-tung =

Taiwanese actor (1929–2021)

Chang Kuo-tung (Chinese: 張國棟; Pe̍h-ōe-jī: Tiuⁿ Kok-tòng; 1929 – 31 October 2021) was a Taiwanese actor who received the Golden Bell Award for Best Supporting Actor in a Miniseries or Television Film in 2009.

== Life ==
Chang Kuo-tung was accepted into the Chinese Youth Army alongside Sun Yueh. Chang's acting career began in the 1950s, as a member of a stage acting troupe. He later joined China Television as an actor and costume designer. Chang became known for appearing in comedies, with a breakout role in a 1979 series. He was the narrator for the 1990 series Wonders of the Mainland. Chang received a nomination at the Golden Bell Awards in 1993, and eventually won the award in 2009. He was known for sense of humor, crediting Public Television Service with recycling him during his Golden Bell Award acceptance speech in 2009.

Chang's son followed him into the television industry, working for VL Sports.

Chang died on 31 October 2021, aged 92.
