= 60th Golden Horse Awards =

Award ceremony for Chinese-language films of 2022 and 2023

- Promotional poster
- Date: November 25, 2023
- Site: Sun Yat-sen Memorial Hall, Taipei, Taiwan
- Hosted by: Lulu Huang Lu Zi Yin
- Preshow hosts: Pink Yang and Tsao Yu-ning
- Organized by: Taipei Golden Horse Film Festival Executive Committee

Highlights
- Best Feature Film: Stonewalling
- Best Director: Hsiao Ya-chuan; Old Fox
- Best Actor: Wu Kang-ren; Abang Adik
- Best Actress: Audrey Lin; Trouble Girl
- Most awards: Old Fox (4)
- Most nominations: Snow in Midsummer (9)

Television in Taiwan
- Network: TTV myVideo and Line Today (online streaming)

The 60th Golden Horse Awards (Chinese: 第60屆金馬獎) took place on November 25, 2023, at the Sun Yat-sen Memorial Hall in Taipei, Taiwan. Organized by the Taipei Golden Horse Film Festival Executive Committee, the awards honored the best in Chinese-language filmography of 2022 and 2023. Nominations were announced on October 3, 2023.

Stonewalling from husband-and-wife duo Ryuji Otsuka and Huang Ji won Best Narrative Feature (along with Best Editing), awhile Old Fox get the most win with 4 awards despite Snow in Midsummer received most of the nomination (in which, they only won Best Sound Effects). One of the big headline during the award ceremony was Audrey Lin, who became the youngest actress ever to won the Best Leading Actress at the age of 12.

== Ceremony information ==
- Due to changes in the maintenance schedule, the awards ceremony took place once again at the Sun Yat-sen Memorial Hall in Taipei.
- Taiwanese filmmaker Ang Lee who is the former Chair of the Taipei Golden Horse Film Festival Executive Committee (2018−2022), serves as president of the jury for the second time, ten years after he served in the 50th edition in 2013.

== Winners and nominees ==
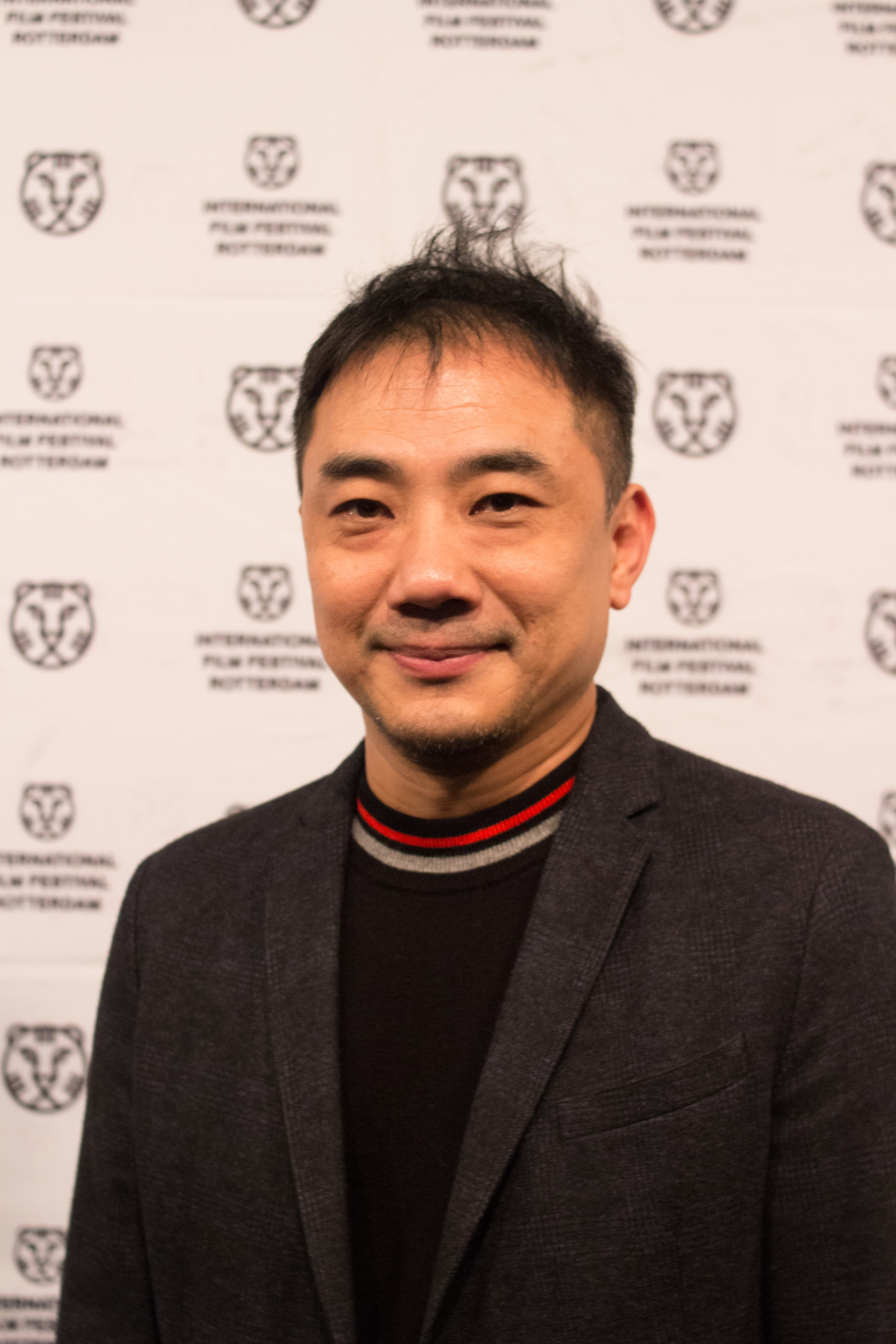
Hsiao Ya-chuan, Best Director winner

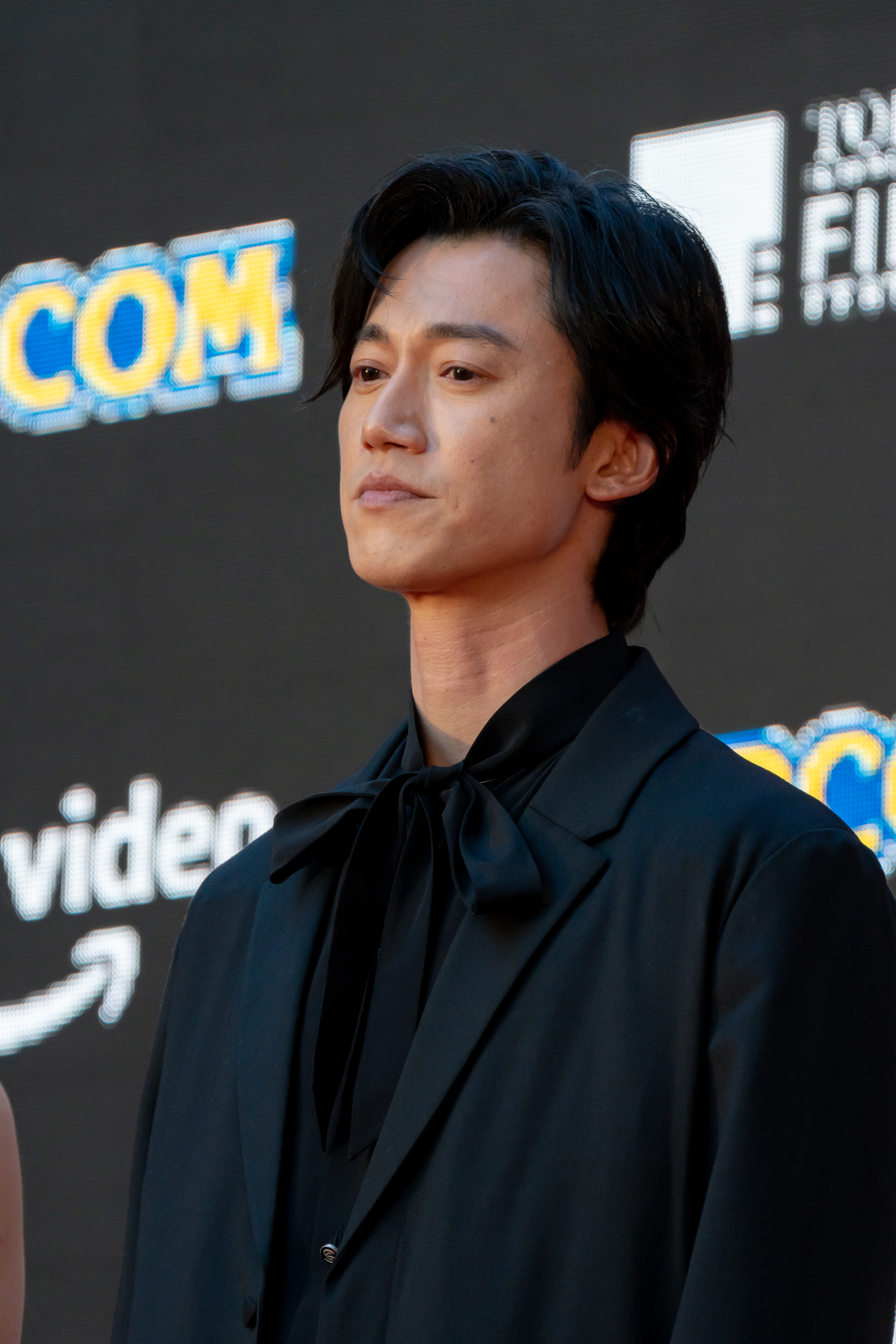
Wu Kang-ren, Best Leading Actor winner

Yoyo Tse, Best New Performer winner

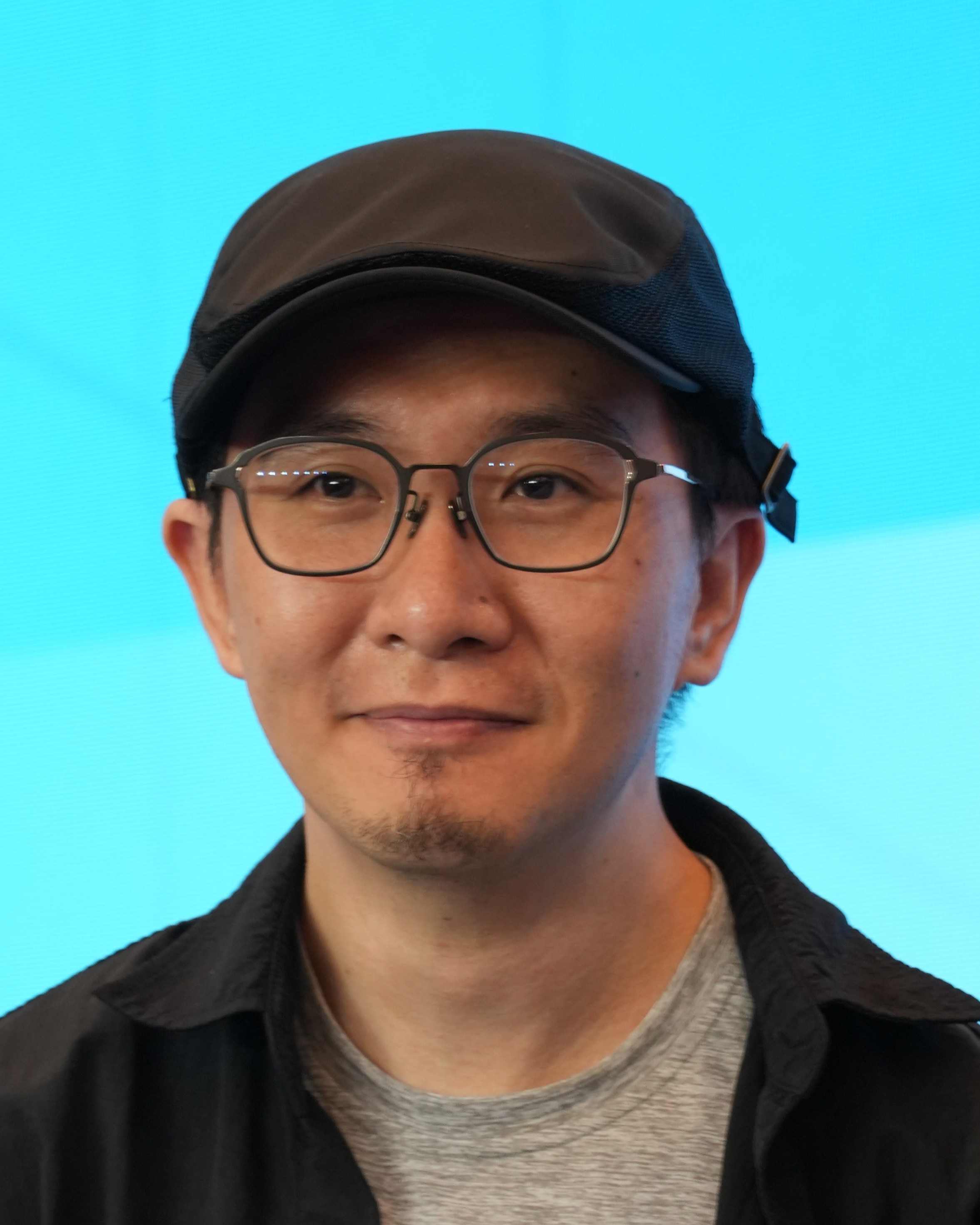
Nick Cheuk, Best New Director winner

Cheng Wei-hao, Best Adapted Screenplay co-winner

Wang Bing, Best Documentary Feature winner

Brigitte Lin, Lifetime Achievement Award recipient

Winners are listed first and highlighted in boldface.

**Best Narrative Feature**: **Stonewalling**; Marry My Dead Body; Time Still Turns the Pages; Eye of the Storm; Snow in Midsummer	**Best Director**: **Hsiao Ya-chuan – Old Fox**; Huang Ji and Ryuji Otsuka – Stonewalling; Cheng Wei-hao – Marry My Dead Body; Chong Keat Aun – Snow in Midsummer; Wong Ching-po – The Pig, The Snake and The Pigeon
**Best Leading Actor**: **Wu Kang-ren – Abang Adik**; Ethan Juan – The Pig, The Snake and The Pigeon; Wang Po-chieh – Eye of the Storm; Greg Hsu – Marry My Dead Body; Austin Lin – Marry My Dead Body	**Best Leading Actress**: **Audrey Lin – Trouble Girl**; Hu Ling – Carp Leaping Over Dragon's Gate; Chung Suet Ying – The Lyricist Wannabe; Monica Lu – Day Off; Jennifer Yu – In Broad Daylight
**Best Supporting Actor**: **Akio Chen – Old Fox**; Jack Tan – Abang Adik; Sean Wong – Time Still Turns the Pages; Fu Meng-po – Day Off; Bowie Lam – In Broad Daylight	**Best Supporting Actress**: **Beatrice Fang – Day Off**; Eugenie Liu – Old Fox; Ivy Chen – Trouble Girl; Wanfang – Snow in Midsummer; Rachel Leung – In Broad Daylight
**Best New Director**: **Nick Cheuk – Time Still Turns the Pages**; Alan – This Woman; Jin Ong – Abang Adik; Lee Hong-chi – Love Is a Gun; Sun Jie – The Mountain Is Coming	**Best New Performer**: **Yoyo Tse – Fly Me to the Moon**; Tan Kim-wang – Abang Adik; Daniel Hong – Miss Shampoo; Travis Hu – A Boy and a Girl; Yeh Hsiao-fei – Who'll Stop the Rain
**Best Original Screenplay**: **Sun Jie – The Mountain Is Coming**; Yan Xiaolin – Carp Leaping Over Dragon's Gate; Huang Ji and Ryuji Otsuka – Stonewalling; Nick Cheuk – Time Still Turns the Pages; Chin Chia-hua – Trouble Girl	**Best Adapted Screenplay**: **Wu Chin-jung and Cheng Wei-hao – Marry My Dead Body**; Wong Yee-lam – The Lyricist Wannabe; Chong Keat Aun – Snow in Midsummer; Sasha Chuk – Fly Me to the Moon
**Best Documentary Feature**: **Youth (Spring)**; Elegies; Where; Free Beats: The Musical Journey of Chen Ming Chang; The Clinic	**Best Animated Feature**: **Pigsy**
**Best Live Action Short Film**: **Before the Box Gets Emptied**; Reclaim My Summer; Boys on the Bridge; Al Niente; The Stag	**Best Documentary Short Film**: **The Memo**; Of Dreams in the Dream of Another Mirror; Hearing from the Dolphin; Eviction and Beyond; Girl of Wind
**Best Animated Short Film**: **Monsoon Blue**; The Egret River; Ever-Changing Clouds, Like My Ever-Changing Life; Ghost of the Dark Path; Braided	**Best Cinematography**: **Yu Jing-pin – Fish Memories**; Kartik Vijay – Abang Adik; Jake Pollock – Eye of the Storm; Hsu Chih-chun – Snow in Midsummer; Chen Chi-wen – Who'll Stop the Rain
**Best Visual Effects**: **Archin Yen – Eye of the Storm**; Tu Wei-ting – Trouble Girl; Lin Chi-feng, Bala Lin, Liu Jia-xuan and Aben Lee – The Bridge Curse: Ritual; Tomi Kuo, Hulk Chen and Gareth Wang – The Pig, The Snake and The Pigeon	**Best Art Direction**: **Huang Mei-ching and Tu Shuo-feng – Eye of the Storm**; Wang Chih-cheng and You Li-wen – Old Fox; Huang Mei-ching and Cheng Chia-cheng – Trouble Girl; Wu Jo-yun – Miss Shampoo; Albert Poon Yick-sum and Kate Tse – In Broad Daylight
**Best Makeup & Costume Design**: **Wang Chih-cheng and Shirley Kao – Old Fox**; Elaine Ng – Abang Adik; Elaine Ng – Snow in Midsummer; Karen Yip, Hsiao Pai-chen and Liu Hsien-chia – Miss Shampoo; Albert Poon Yick-sum and Chan Hau-sin – In Broad Daylight	**Best Action Choreography**: **Hung Shih-hao – The Pig, The Snake and The Pigeon**; Chiu Li-wei and Tony Wang – Pigsy; Hung Shih-hao – Marry My Dead Body; Hung Shih-hao – Miss Shampoo; Wu Jun-xi – The Bridge Curse: Ritual
**Best Original Film Score**: **Chris Hou – Old Fox**; Thomas Foguenne – Trouble Girl; Luming Lu – Eye of the Storm; Yii Kah-hoe and Chong Keat Aun – Snow in Midsummer; Luming Lu, Lin Hsiao-chin, Lin Sih-yu and Baobu Badulu – The Pig, The Snake and The Pigeon	**Best Original Film Song**: **"The Usual" – Day Off**; **Composer: George Chen**; **Lyrics: Wu Nien-jen**; **Performer: Hung Pei-yu**; "Untitled" – Marry My Dead Body; Composer: Jolin Tsai and Kay Liu; Lyrics: Vison Chen and David Ke; Performer: Jolin Tsai; "A Walk to Remember" – Abang Adik; Composer: Ryota Katayama; Lyrics: Aki Huang and Ryota Katayama; Performer: Ryota Katayama; "Fledgling" – Old Fox; Composer: Chris Hou; Lyrics: Hsu Hui-ting; Performer: Power Station; "May Threnody" – Snow in Midsummer; Composer: Aki Huang; Lyrics: Chong Keat Aun; Performer: Wanfang
**Best Film Editing**: **Liao Ching-sung and Ryuji Otsuka – Stonewalling**; Chen Chun-hung – Marry My Dead Body; Keith Chan Hiu-chun and Nick Cheuk – Time Still Turns the Pages; Shieh Meng-ju – Eye of the Storm; Wong Ching-po – The Pig, The Snake and The Pigeon	**Best Sound Effects**: **Tu Duu-chih, Wu Shu-yao and Chen Kuan-ting – Snow in Midsummer**; Sidney Hu and Li Chun-yi – Trouble Girl; Book Chien, Sun Sy-yuan and Tang Hsiang-chu – Eye of the Storm; Tu Duu-chih and Huang Yuan-tse – A Boy and a Girl; Book Chien, Chen Jia-li, Yang Jia-shen and Tang Hsiang-chu – The Pig, The Snake and The Pigeon

=== Honorary awards ===
**Lifetime Achievement Award**: **Brigitte Lin**; **Chen Kun-hou**	**Outstanding Taiwanese Filmmaker of the Year**: **Lin Shih-ken**

=== External awards ===
**Audience Choice Award** **(picked by audience members who watched the Best Narrative Feature nominated entries in its entirety)**: **Time Still Turns the Pages**; Stonewalling; Marry My Dead Body; Eye of the Storm; Snow in Midsummer	**FIPRESCI Prize** **(award for first and second features)**: **Fly Me to the Moon**; This Woman; Abang Adik; Time Still Turns the Pages; Love Is a Gun; A Boy and a Girl; Who'll Stop the Rain; The Mountain Is Coming
**NETPAC Award** **(award for feature films by Asian new talent)**: **Fly Me to the Moon**; Time Still Turns the Pages; Abang Adik; Dreaming & Dying; Trouble Girl; The Mountain Is Coming; A Tour Guide; Guras; Solids by the Seashore; In My Mother's Skin; After the Fever	**Observation Missions for Asian Cinema Award** **(picked from NETPAC Award nominated entries)**: **The Mountain Is Coming**; Time Still Turns the Pages; Fly Me to the Moon; Abang Adik; Dreaming & Dying; Trouble Girl; A Tour Guide; Guras; Solids by the Seashore; In My Mother's Skin; After the Fever

== Jury ==
Winners are jointly decided by the final stage jurors.

=== Final stage jurors ===
- Ang Lee, Taiwanese filmmaker (Jury President)
- Eric Shih, Taiwanese film distributor
- Mo Tzu-yi, Taiwanese actor
- Anthony Chen, Singaporean filmmaker
- Kay Huang, Taiwanese musician
- Liu Wei-jan, Taiwanese film producer and screenwriter

=== Shortlist and final stage jurors ===
- Sung Wen-chung, Taiwanese cinematographer
- Chris Shum Wai-chung, Hong Kong lyricist
- Boo Junfeng, Singaporean filmmaker
- John Hsu, Taiwanese filmmaker
- Umin Boya, Taiwanese film director and actor
- Ma Hsin, Taiwanese film critic
- Chen Po-jen, Taiwanese production designer
- Laha Mebow, Taiwanese filmmaker
- Heiward Mak, Hong Kong filmmaker
- Joe Hsieh, Taiwanese animation director

=== Preliminary, shortlist, final stage and documentary juror ===
- Jill Li, Taiwanese documentary filmmaker

=== Preliminary and documentary jurors ===
- Hung Chun-hsiu, Taiwanese documentary filmmaker
- Stefano Centini, Italian filmmaker
- Huang Yi-ling, Taiwanese film editor
- Lau Kek Huat, Malaysian filmmaker

=== Preliminary and animation jurors ===
- Yu Yu, Taiwanese animation director
- Wu De-chuen, Taiwanese animation director
- Wong Ping, Hong Kong animation artist

=== Preliminary and live action short film jurors ===
- Lam Sum, Hong Kong filmmaker
- Hsu Kuo-lun, Taiwanese film producer
- Tseng Ying-ting, Taiwanese filmmaker
- Huang Xi, Taiwanese filmmaker
- Ryan Cheng, Taiwanese film critic
- Hsieh Pei-ju, Taiwanese filmmaker

=== Preliminary and narrative feature jurors ===
- Fiona Roan, Taiwanese filmmaker
- Ko Chen-nien, Taiwanese filmmaker
- Chan Ching-lin, Taiwanese filmmaker
- Chienn Hsiang, Taiwanese cinematographer and director
- Cora Yim, Hong Kong producer

=== External awards ===
==== FIPRESCI Prize jury ====
- Paolo Bertolin, Italian film critic, film programmer and film producer
- Kalash Nanda Kumar, Malaysian film critic, film programmer and filmmaker
- Wang Chun-chi, Taiwanese film academic

==== NETPAC Award jury ====
- Jo Ji-hoon, South Korean film programmer and film producer
- Loïc Valceschini, Swiss film programmer and film critic
- Chen Huei-yin, Taiwanese film programmer and film critic

== See also ==
- 41st Hong Kong Film Awards
- 17th Asian Film Awards
