= Tang Chuan =

Taiwanese actor (1952–2022)

Tang Chuan (Chinese: 唐川; Pe̍h-ōe-jī: Tn̂g Chhoan; Pha̍k-fa-sṳ: Thông Chhon; 19 April 1952 – 13 March 2022) was a Taiwanese actor.

Tang was raised in the Hakka community of Nanzhuang, Miaoli. He began his acting career in 1972, after graduating from an acting program. He received the Golden Bell Award for Best Supporting Actor in a Miniseries or Television Film in 2008 and won the Golden Bell Award for Best Actor in a Miniseries or Television Film. In 2021, Tang was nominated for a second Best Actor in a Miniseries or Television Film Award. He sought medical treatment in March 2021, after two strokes and a subsequent lung infection. He died on 13 March 2022, at age 69..

== Selected filmography ==
- The Unforgettable Memory (2005)
- All in 700 (2016)
- Let's Go Crazy on LIVE! (2019–2020)
- Gold Leaf (2021)
