= The Accidental Influencer =

2024 Taiwanese television series

Chinese name
- Traditional Chinese: 何百芮的地獄毒白
Transcriptions
Standard Mandarin
- Tongyong Pinyin: Hé bǎi ruì de dìyù dú bái
Southern Min
- Tâi-lô: Hô Pik-juī ê Tē-ga̍k To̍k-pe̍k
- Genre: Comedy; Family love
- Written by: Lu Hui-Hsin; Pei-Ju Hsieh
- Directed by: Pei-Ju Hsieh
- Starring: Kuo Shu-yao; Aviis Zhong; Sun Ke-fang; Ken Lin; Ray Chang; Eleven Yao
- Country of origin: Taiwan
- Original language: Taiwanese Mandarin
- No. of seasons: 1
- No. of episodes: 13

Production
- Producers: Liu Wan-Ling; Chen Yu-Chia
- Production companies: Each Other Films, Inc.

Original release
- Network: HBO Go
- Release: February 10, 2024 – present

The Accidental Influencer (Chinese: 何百芮的地獄毒白) is a Taiwanese comedy series that premiered on HBO Go and was directed by Pei-Ju Hsieh. The series stars Kuo Shu-yao, Aviis Zhong, Sun Ke-fang, Ray Chang, Eleven Yao and Ken Lin.
