= Mr. Long =

- Theatrical release poster
- Kanji: ミスター・ロン
- Directed by: Sabu
- Written by: Sabu
- Produced by: Stephan Holl; Shôzô Ichiyama; Koki Kageyama; Jacky Pang; Yoichi Shimizu
- Starring: Chang Chen; Sho Aoyagi; Eleven Yao; Bai Run-yin
- Cinematography: Kôichi Furuya
- Edited by: Georg Petzold
- Music by: Junichi Matsumoto
- Release dates: 13 February 2017 (Berlin); 16 December 2017 (Japan)
- Running time: 129 minutes
- Countries: Japan; Hong Kong; Taiwan; Germany
- Languages: Mandarin; Japanese; Taiwanese

Mr. Long is a 2017 internationally co-produced crime drama film directed by Sabu. It was selected to compete for the Golden Bear in the main competition section of the 67th Berlin International Film Festival.

== Cast ==
- Chang Chen as Long
- Sho Aoyagi as Kenji
- Eleven Yao as Lily
- Bai Run-yin as Jun
- Masashi Arifuku as Heisuke
- Taro Suwa as Tadao
- Ritsuko Okusa as Kumiko
- Shiiko Utagawa as Machiko
- Yusuke Fukuchi as Jiang
- Tetsuya Chiba as Sakata
