= Haunted House Secrets =

2026 Taiwanese horror drama television series

- Promotional poster

Chinese name
- Traditional Chinese: 凶宅專賣店
Transcriptions
Standard Mandarin
- Tongyong Pinyin: Syōngjhái jhuānmài diàn
Southern Min
- Tâi-lô: ok-tshù tsuan-bē-tiàm
- Genre: Horror; Thriller
- Written by: Lin Pin-chun; Yeh Ching-ju
- Directed by: Lester Hsi; Hao Fang-wei
- Starring: Christopher Lee; Hong Huifang; Shih Ming-shuai; Fandy Fan; Buffy Chen; Allison Lin
- Country of origin: Taiwan
- Original languages: Taiwanese Mandarin, Taiwanese Hokkien
- No. of seasons: 1
- No. of episodes: 10

Production
- Producer: Lo Pei-yi
- Production company: True Fun Entertainment

Original release
- Network: Disney+
- Release: January 16, 2026 – present

Haunted House Secrets (Chinese: 凶宅專賣店) is a 10-episode original Taiwanese horror television series that premiered on Disney+ on January 16, 2026. The series was inspired by real-life events.

== Plot ==
Haunted House Secrets follows the protagonist A-Ze, who decides to sell the haunted house he has lived in for many years in order to raise money for his younger sister Hsin Ai's heart transplant. However, by chance, he becomes a rookie real estate agent at "Yi-Sheng Realty", a shop specializing in selling haunted houses. This haunted house specialty store is home to a group of partners with distinct personalities, who partners with a psychic team to resolve the lingering obsessions, regrets, and grudges of restless spirits attached to these homes.

== Cast ==
Actor	Role	Description
Christopher Lee	Tseng Kuo-hsiung	Owner of "Yi-Sheng Realty".
Fandy Fan	A-Ze	A rookie real estate agent who decides to sell the haunted house he has lived in for many years in order to raise money for his sister's heart transplant.
Buffy Chen	Hsiao Mo	Psychic girl
Hong Huifang	Pi Ying-hsüeh	Psychic granny.
Shih Ming-shuai	Chen Yung-jen	Estate agent.
Allison Lin	Chiu Wan-yü	Chen Yung-jen's wife, who is also a police officer.

== Production ==
Director Lester Hsi stated that his creative inspiration came partly from the South Korean film Along with the Gods: The Two Worlds. He pointed out that as an Asian country that also values funeral rites and folk beliefs, Taiwan also has the cultural foundation to develop its own narratives on the themes of life and death. Hsi believes that in addition to creating a suspenseful atmosphere, the work also hopes to convey emotional warmth and guide the audience to view themes such as haunted houses and the dead from different perspectives.

The principal photography of the film began in March 2024.

== Release ==
On 27 June 2025, the first two episodes of Haunted House Secrets premiered at the Taipei Film Festival at Zhongshan Hall. An illustrated poster designed by visual artist Steven Tung was also unveiled on the same day. The two directors, producer Lo Pei-yi, and the main cast attended the premiere. A media tea party was held on 24 January, where the main cast members gave interviews.

The series premiered on Disney+ on 16 January, 2026, with two episodes released every Friday. Within 48 hours of its release, the show ranked number one on Disney+'s trending charts in Taiwan.
