= Wang Po-chieh =

Taiwanese actor

- 王柏傑
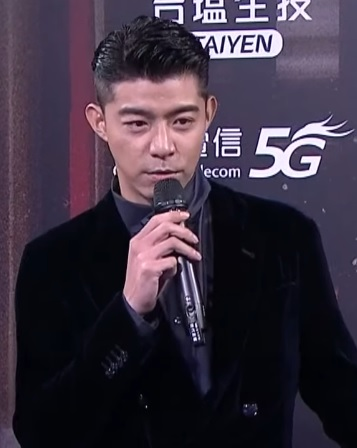
- Wang at the 57th Golden Bell Awards in October 2022
- Born: 25 September 1989 (age 37); Beitou District, Taipei, Taiwan
- Other names: Jacob Wang; Edison Wang; Wang Bo-chieh
- Education: Asia-Pacific Institute of Creativity
- Occupation: Actor
- Years active: 2006–present

Chinese name
- Traditional Chinese: 王柏傑
- Simplified Chinese: 王柏杰
- Hanyu Pinyin: Wáng Bòjié
- Hokkien POJ: Ông Peh-kia̍t

Wang Po-chieh (Chinese: 王柏傑; Pe̍h-ōe-jī: Ông Peh-kia̍t; born 25 September 1989) is a Taiwanese actor. Known for his roles in both film and television, he has won two Taipei Film Awards and been nominated for a Hundred Flowers Award, a Golden Horse Award and three Golden Bell Awards.

== Career ==
Wang debuted in 2006, starring in a Cyndi Wang music video. He won the Award for Best New Talent at the 2008 Taipei Film Awards for his performance in Winds of September.

== Filmography ==
=== Film ===
Year	English title	Original title	Role	Notes
2008	Winds of September	九降風	Lee Yao-hsing	
2009	Bodyguards and Assassins	十月圍城	Li Chongguang	
2010	Juliets	茱麗葉	Luo Wei	
2011	The Lost Bladesman	關雲長	Emperor Xian of Han	
2011	The Founding of a Party	建黨偉業	Xiao Zisheng	
2011	Mr. & Mrs. Incredible	神奇俠侶	Grandmaster Blanc	
2011	Somebody to Love	我們約會吧	Lu Jia-sen	
2011	Pick the Youth	皮克青春	Eatery boss	
2012	Life of Pi	—N/a	Sailor	
2012	Young Dudes	騷人	Wu An-liang	
2013	Forever Love	阿嬤的夢中情人	Wan Bao-long	
2014	Paradise in Service	軍中樂園	Chung Hua-hsing	
2014	A Fantastic Ghost Wedding	非常婚事	Wu Shan-peng	
2015	The Laundryman	青田街一號		
2016	Rookie Chef	神廚	Wu Zhi-ming	
2016	White Lies, Black Lies	失控謊言	Su Jun-jie	
2018	Omotenashi	盛情款待	Jacky	
2019	One Headlight	絕世情歌	Qiu Wen-kai	
2023	Eye of the Storm	疫起	Xia Zheng	
2024	The Embers	餘燼	Huang Chun-sheng	
2025	96 Minutes	96 分鐘	Liu Kai	
2025	Tristes Tropiques	슬픈 열대		

=== Television series ===
Year	English title	Original title	Role	Notes
2008	You Are My One And Only	你是我的唯一	Wu Qi-gang	
2018	Women in Beijing	北京女子圖鑑	Yu Yang	
2018	Befriend	人際關係事務所	Ding Shao-en	
2019	Yong-jiu Grocery Store	用九柑仔店	Young Yang Chin-te	
2019	Nowhere Man	罪夢者	Xiao Sha	
2021	More than Blue: The Series	比悲傷更悲傷的故事：影集版	Wang Po-han	
2021	Light the Night	華燈初上	Henry	
2022	Women in Taipei	台北女子圖鑑	Li Cheng-en	
2023	Taiwan Crime Stories	台灣犯罪故事－生死困局		
2026	Million-Follower Detective	百萬人推理		
2026	Agent from Above	乩身	San Tai Zi	

== Awards and nominations ==
Year	Award	Category	Nominated work	Result
2008	10th Taipei Film Awards	Best New Talent	Winds of September	Won
2010	30th Hundred Flowers Awards	Best Newcomer	Bodyguards and Assassins	Nominated
2010	45th Golden Bell Awards	Best Supporting Actor in a Miniseries or Television Film	Birthday Wish	Nominated
2020	55th Golden Bell Awards	Best Supporting Actor in a Miniseries or Television Film	Nowhere Man	Nominated
2022	57th Golden Bell Awards	Best Leading Actor in a Miniseries or Television Film	More Than Blue: The Series	Nominated
2023	25th Taipei Film Festival	Best Actor	Eye of the Storm	Won
2023	60th Golden Horse Awards	Best Leading Actor	Eye of the Storm	Nominated
