= Dear Tenant =

2020 Taiwanese film

- Film poster
- Traditional Chinese: 親愛的房客
- Hanyu Pinyin: Qīn'ài De Fángkè
- Hokkien POJ: Chhin‑ài-ê-pâng‑kha
- Directed by: Cheng Yu-chieh
- Written by: Cheng Yu-chieh
- Produced by: Yang Ya-che; Cheng Yu-chieh
- Starring: Mo Tzu-yi; Chen Shu-fang; Bai Run-yin
- Cinematography: Meteor Cheung
- Edited by: Chen Hsiao-Tong; Cheng Yu-chieh
- Music by: Frandé
- Production companies: Filmosa Production; Outland Film Production
- Release dates: July 4, 2020 (2020 Taipei Film Festival); October 23, 2020 (Taiwan)
- Running time: 106 minutes
- Country: Taiwan
- Languages: Mandarin; Taiwanese Hokkien

Dear Tenant (Chinese: 親愛的房客) is a 2020 Taiwanese drama film directed by Cheng Yu-chieh starring Mo Tzu-yi, Chen Shu-fang and Bai Run-yin. It was primarily filmed in Keelung city and contains themes such as homosexuality, euthanasia and adoption rights. The film won both Best Leading Actor for Mo and Best Supporting Actress for Chen at the 57th Golden Horse Awards.

== Cast ==
- Mo Tzu-yi as Lin Jian-yi (林健一)
- Chen Shu-fang as Zhou Xiu-yu (周秀玉)
- Bai Run-yin as Wang You-yu (王悠宇)
- Yao Chun-yao as Wang Li-wei (王立維)
- Jay Shih as Wang Li-gang (王立綱)

== Awards and nominations ==
Year	Awards ceremony	Category	Nominee	Result	Ref
2020	57th Golden Horse Awards	Best Feature Film	Dear Tenant	Nominated	
2020	57th Golden Horse Awards	Best Director	Cheng Yu-chieh	Nominated	
2020	57th Golden Horse Awards	Best Leading Actor	Mo Tzu-yi	Won	
2020	57th Golden Horse Awards	Best Supporting Actress	Chen Shu-fang	Won	
2020	57th Golden Horse Awards	Best Original Screenplay	Cheng Yu-chieh	Nominated	
2020	57th Golden Horse Awards	Best Original Film Score	Fran Chen	Won	
