= Mickey Chen =

Taiwanese LGBTQ documentary filmmaker

Mickey Chen (1967 - December 10, 2018) was a Taiwanese documentary director, writer, and LGBTQ rights activist. He was known for his works that focused on marginalized issues, especially the life stories of LGBTQ individuals. He was also a significant figure in the history of the LGBTQ movement in Taiwan. He died of cardiogenic shock at his home on December 10, 2018.

== Biography ==
Chen was born in 1967 in Taiwan. He graduated from the Department of Radio and Television at National Chengchi University in 1991. He started his career as a journalist and a film critic. He later became a documentary director and a writer. He was also an active participant and organizer of LGBTQ events and campaigns in Taiwan.

== Works ==
Chen's works mainly explored the themes of gender, sexuality, identity, and human rights. He used his camera to document the lives and struggles of LGBTQ people in Taiwan and abroad. He also wrote books and articles on LGBTQ issues and culture. Some of his works were adapted for stage shows or inspired other filmmakers.

=== Documentary films ===
Some of Chen's documentary films are:

- Not Simply a Wedding Banquet (1997): A film that follows the lives of four gay couples in Taiwan and their families.
- Boys for Beauty (1999): A film that examines the phenomenon of male beauty salons and the subculture of young gay men in Taiwan. It was the first LGBTQ documentary to be screened in theaters in Taiwan.
- War of the Roses (2002): A film that depicts the conflicts and negotiations between the LGBTQ community and the conservative religious groups in Taiwan over the issue of same-sex marriage.
- Memorandum on Happiness (2003): A film that chronicles the experiences of four gay men who travel to Thailand for sex reassignment surgery.
- My Friend With AIDS (2004): A film that portrays the stories of four people living with HIV/AIDS in Taiwan and their friends and families.
- Scars on Memory (2005): A film that investigates the history and impact of the White Terror era in Taiwan through the personal memories of Chen and his family.
- Queers on Stage (2006): A film that showcases the performances and interviews of various LGBTQ artists and activists in Taiwan.
- Taipei Dad, New York Mom (Unfinished): A film that traces the life of Chen's father, who left Taiwan for New York in the 1970s and married a Jewish woman.

=== Video poetry ===
- Fragile in Love (2007): A video poem that expresses the emotions and thoughts of a gay man who falls in love with a straight man.

=== Books ===
Chen also wrote two books based on his personal experiences and observations:

- The death of the youth from Gaoshu〈人間．失格──高樹少年之死〉（2008）: A book that recounts the tragic suicide of a gay teenager in a rural town in Taiwan and the social and cultural factors that led to his death.
- Taipei Dad, New York Mom《臺北爸爸，紐約媽媽》 （時報文化，2011）: A book that narrates the story of Chen's father, who left Taiwan for New York in the 1970s and married a Jewish woman, and the impact of his decision on his family and himself.

=== Related works ===
Some of Chen's works were adapted for stage shows or inspired other filmmakers:

- After School (2023): A film directed by Blue Lan that is based on Chen's documentary Boys for Beauty. Three former high school friends reunite to visit their ailing teacher, Mickey. Revisiting their old cram school in the 1990s, they recall their rebellious youth. Known for its strict rules, the school had been a challenge until Mickey arrived as a new teacher. He not only tamed the troublemakers but became their close friend. Mickey opened their minds by discussing relationships, sexuality, and advocating for the gay community, helping his students understand both themselves and broader issues of identity .
- Taipei Dad, New York Mom (2012): A stage show adapted by Li Huan-hsiung from Chen's book of the same name. The show depicts the cross-cultural and intergenerational conflicts and connections between Chen's father and his family in Taiwan and New York.

== Awards ==
Chen received several awards and recognitions for his works and contributions:

- 2000 Taiwan International Documentary Festival - Audience Award for Boys for Beauty
- 2008 China Times Literary Award for The death of the youth from Gaoshu
- 2012 Taipei International Book Exhibition Book Prize - non-fiction category for Taipei Dad, New York Mom
- 2019 Taipei Film Awards - Yang Shih-chi Outstanding Contribution Award for his achievements in documentary filmmaking and LGBTQ activism

== Commemorations ==
On March 1, 2023, Google featured a doodle on its homepage with the theme "In Honor of Mickey Chen." On this day in 1999, his film Boys for Beauty became Taiwan's first LGBTQ+ documentary to be screened in theaters.
