= Akio Chen =

Taiwanese actor

- 陳慕義
- Born: 29 September 1956 (age 69); Taipei, Taiwan
- Awards: Golden Bell Award for Best Actor in a Miniseries or Television Film

Akio Chen (Chinese: 陳慕義; pinyin: Chén Mùyì; Pe̍h-ōe-jī: Tân Bō͘-gī; born 29 September 1956) is a Taiwanese actor. He won the Golden Bell Award for Best Actor in a Miniseries or Television Film in 2006.

He played the role of Lih in the 2004 film Come the Black Dog directed by Stan Yin. In 2009, Chen appeared in The Sight of Father’s Back, a segment of Chang Tso-chi's anthology film How Are You, Dad. In The Boar King (2014), directed by Kuo Chen-ti, Chen's character dies during Typhoon Morakot. Prior to taking a leading role on the 2017 television drama The Teenage Psychic, Chen had appeared in several supporting roles on television. At the 60th Golden Horse Awards, he won Best Supporting Actor for his performance in Old Fox.
