= The Blue and the Black =

1958 novel by Wang Lan

The Blue and the Black (Chinese: 藍與黑) is a novel written by the Republic of China writer Wang Lan, published in 1958 and regarded as one of the four major novels of the Second Sino-Japanese War. The novel has been adapted into films, television dramas, and other media.

The story tells of a love story between the protagonist Chang Hsing-ya, the orphan Tang Chi, and Cheng Mei-chuang from a prominent family. It spans from the beginning of the Second Sino-Japanese War through the Second Chinese Civil War and continues until the government of the Republic of China retreated to Taiwan. The Blue and the Black is renowned for its tightly constructed narrative interwoven with historical events, which contributes to its enduring popularity and makes it more readable within the context of anti-communist literature of its time, and continues to be in circulation to this day.

The novel has a word count of 420 thousand. The background timeframe in the story begins with the outbreak of the Second Sino-Japanese War in 1937 and culminates in the migration of the Republic of China government to Taiwan in 1949.

== Plot ==
As time goes by, the story unfolds in China including T'ien-chin, Pei-ching, Ch’ung-ch’ing, Shanghai, and even Taipei Taiwan during the standoff between the Kuomintang and the Chinese Communist Party. These transitions coincide with the government relocation footprint of the Republic of China.

The story finishes in T'ien-chin, where the protagonist Chang Hsing-ya and Tang Chi, who joined an anti-communism act in the Yunnan-Burma border region, reunite after they promised to meet here again after the triumphant call of anti-communist cause. It implies that the government's aspiration, “retake the mainland and revive the nation”, will ultimately be realized.

== Evaluation ==
That the novel holds a distinctive position for its narrative is in line with Taiwan's anti-communist literary policies of the 1950s and is regarded as a representative work of anti-communist literature in Taiwan.
