= Fandy Fan =

Taiwanese actor

- 范少勳
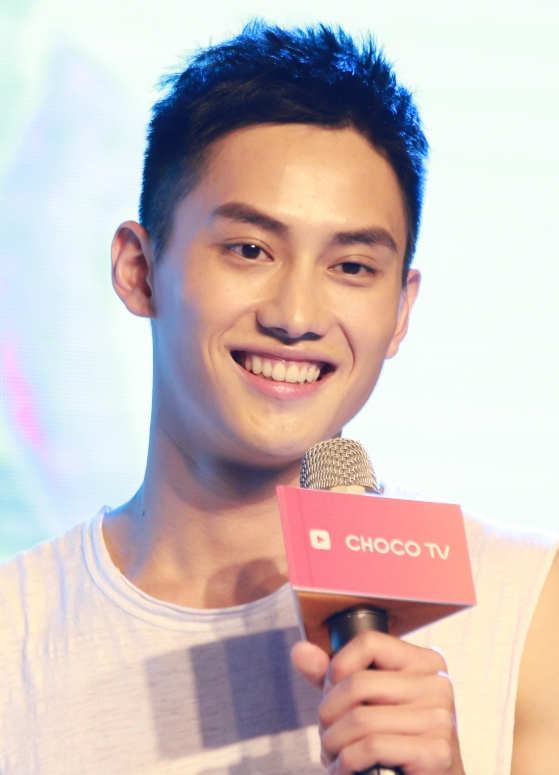
- Fan in 2018
- Born: Fan Shao-hsun; November 4, 1993 (age 32); Taiwan
- Education: Hwa Hsia University of Technology
- Occupations: Actor; model
- Years active: 2012–present

Chinese name
- Traditional Chinese: 范少勳
- Simplified Chinese: 范少勋
Transcriptions
Standard Mandarin
- Hanyu Pinyin: Fàn Shǎoxūn
Southern Min
- Hokkien POJ: Hoān Siáu-hun

Fandy Fan Shao-hsun (born November 4, 1993) is a Taiwanese actor and model. Some of his most notable works include Crossing the Line, a popular boys' love drama, and We Are Champions, a film.

== Career ==
Fan debuted in 2012, starring in the series As the Bell Rings. In 2019, he won the 56th Best New Performer, for his performance in We Are Champions.

== Filmography ==
=== Film ===
Year	English title	Original title	Role	Notes
2016	At Cafe 6	六弄咖啡館	Lin Zi-Ming	
2017	Northeast Transfer Student	东北插班生	Xiao-Gui Wu	Telefilm
2018	Love Scams	我的刁蠻女明星	Ah K	Telefilm
2018	Northeast Transfer Student 2	东北插班生2虎啸风声	Xiao-Gui Wu	Telefilm
2018	Code of Brotherhood	艋舺之赤女英雄	Zhi-Ren Li	Telefilm
2019	Bad Boy Symphony	樂獄		
2019	We Are Champions	下半場	Chiang Hsiu-Yu	
2021	Leave Me Alone	不想一個人	Loong	
2022	Mama Boy	初戀慢半拍	Wei Jie	
2024	A Balloon's Landing	我在這裡等你	A-Xiang	Netflix

=== Television series ===
Year	English title	Original title	Role	Notes
2012	As the Bell Rings	課間好時光 1年2班	Ding Liang	
2014		歡喜相逢	Lin Kai-chun	
2016	Mission Perfection	超完美任務	Chen Hsiao-ching	
2018	HIStory2: Crossing the Line	HIStory2-越界	Yu-Hao Hsia	
2019	The Teenage Psychic 2	通靈少女2	Yu-xuan Zhang	
2021	More than Blue: The Series	比悲傷更悲傷的故事：影集版	Che-kai Chang	
2021	Heaven on the 4th Floor	四樓的天堂	Yu Chou	
2022	Women in Taipei	台北女子圖鑑	Hsiao-feng Chiu	
2023	Copycat Killer	模仿犯	Jia-wun Shen	
2023	Oh No! Here Comes Trouble	不良執念清除師	Lin Yong-chuan	
2026	Haunted House Secrets	凶宅專賣店	A-Ze	
TBA	The Way You Shine	因為你如此耀眼		
TBA		X！又是星期一		
TBA		人浮於愛		

=== Variety and reality show ===
Year	English title	Original title	Notes
2013–2015	University	大學生了沒	Regular
2020	Three Piglets S2	阮三个2	Host
2021	Three Piglets SP2	阮三个：環島餐車發大財2	Host
2022	Welcome My Home 1	歡迎光臨-等你來家1	Host
