= Chen Shu-fang =

Taiwanese actress

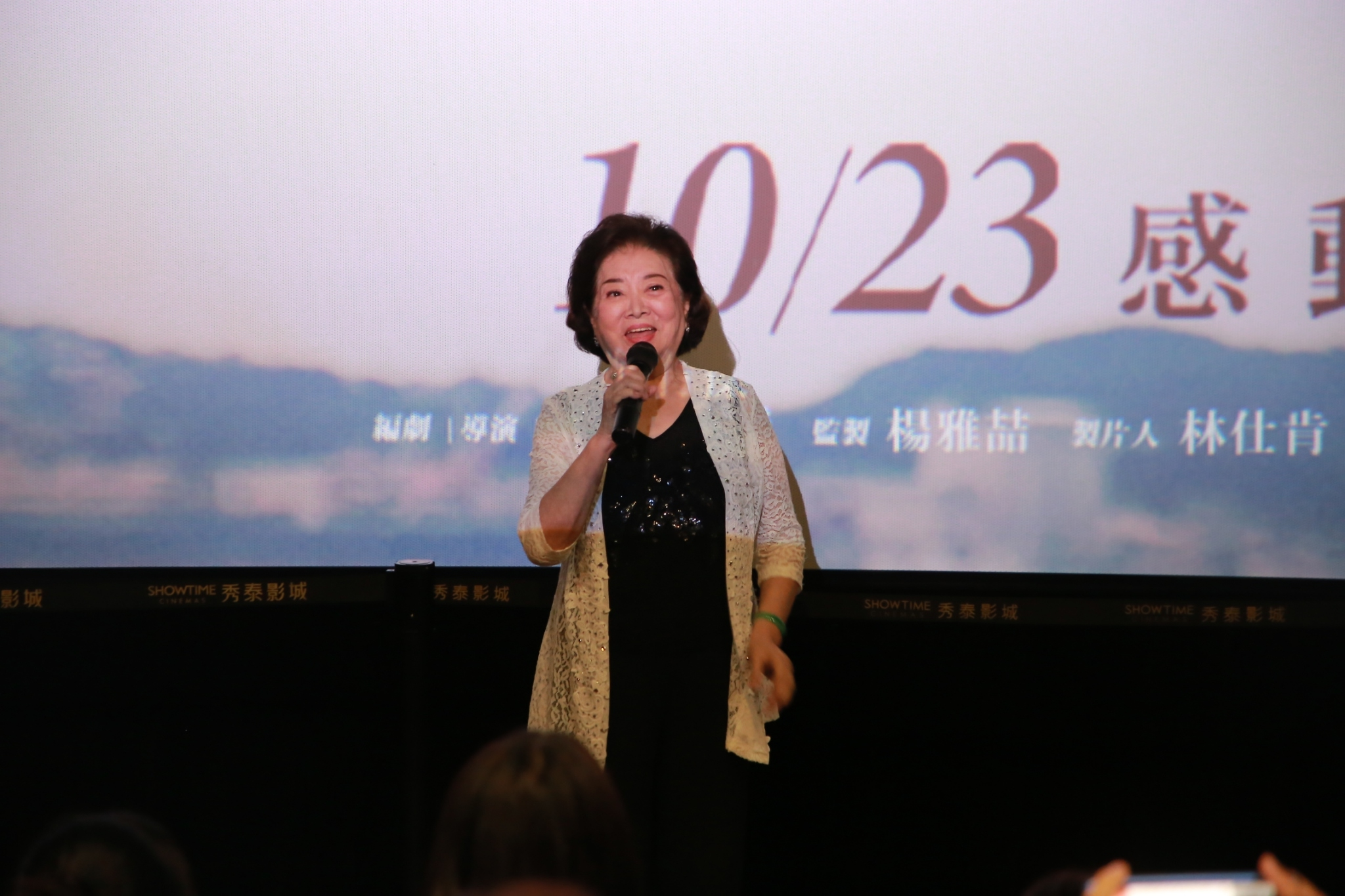
- Chen in 2020
- Born: 2 July 1939 (age 87); Jiufen, Taiwan
- Other name: Grandmother of Taiwan
- Occupation: Actress
- Years active: 1957–present
- Children: 1
- Awards: Golden Horse Awards – 57th Best Actress

Chinese name
- Traditional Chinese: 陳淑芳
- Hanyu Pinyin: Chén Shúfāng

Chen Shu-fang (Chinese: 陳淑芳; pinyin: Chén Shúfāng; born July 2, 1939) is a Taiwanese actress. She made her film debut in 1957 and television debut in 1971. In 2020, she was the recipient of the Best Actress and Best Supporting Actress at the 57th Golden Horse Awards.

== Early life and education ==
Chen Shu-fang was born Siao Chen (陳笑) on July 2, 1939, in Káu-hūn (九份), Taiwan. Siao means "smile" in Chinese, and was chosen by her grandfather in the hopes that she would smile often. She later chose the stage name Shu-Fang, a combination of her virtuous personality and her hometown, Ruifang. Her father was in charge of the town's quarries, while her uncle was the town's mayor.

Chen's grandfather opposed her dreams of becoming an actor, so she instead studied to be a director at the National Taiwan University of Arts, giving her access to the entertainment industry. However, after her father’s death, Chen dropped out of school to support her family financially, taking small roles in films to earn money.

At the National Taiwan University of Arts, Chen's passion for dancing was noticed by her instructor, Zhang-Ying, and he invited her to perform in a stage show that he was directing. During the performance, she was noticed by a talent scout and invited to act the leading role in Whose Sin (1957), which would be her starring debut. She was a prominent actress in the first heyday of the Taiwanese film industry. With a fair and beautiful appearance, Chen was known as the “pocket beauty” of the Taiwanese film industry. In her early career, she also taught dancing when not filming movies.

== Career ==
Chen has appeared in numerous film and television productions, including television series such as Flying Dragon in the Sky (飛龍在天), Perfect Neighbors (親戚不計較), and Taiwan Tornado (台灣龍捲風), and acclaimed movies like A Borrowed Life (1994), A City of Sadness (1989), and Taipei Story (1985).

== Public image ==
=== "Grandmother of Taiwan" ===
Since her first role as a mother in Whose Sin, Chen has received positive reviews for her portrayal of mother and grandmotherhood, continuing to play these roles throughout her career. This has led to a long-lasting public image as a mother or grandmother, and as she became a senior actress in the late part of her career, the nickname "Grandmother of Taiwan" solidified.

=== Philanthropist ===
Chen has appeared in many public service announcements, including for anti-fraud, anti-drug, and health awareness causes. She also participates in charity, most notably donating money and food to single elderly people in the Chinese New Year, as well as highly-needed masks during the COVID-19 pandemic.

== Personal life ==
Chen became pregnant in her early 20s. The child's father was already married.

In 1978, she met Tuching Liang in Australia, and in 1980 migrated to Australia to marry him. However, the marriage was abusive and she returned to Taiwan, unwillingly followed by Liang. Their relationship would remain contentious until the divorce was finalized in 2009 and Liang remarried.

She has a grandson and a granddaughter, who both studied at the National Taiwan University.

According to the Mirror Media's report on 2021 October 13, her endorsement of iVENOR's health food NMN EX was accused of being an unfair and deceptive advertisement.

== Accolades ==
Year	Organizations	Recipients	Category	Result	Ref.
2020	Pingtung Film Festival	After Journey	Best Actress	Won	
2020	57th Golden Horse Awards	Dear Tenant	Best Supporting Actress	Won	
2020	57th Golden Horse Awards	Little Big Women	Best Leading Actress	Won	
2021	15th Asian Film Awards	Little Big Women	Best Actress	Nominated	
2025	62nd Golden Horse Awards		Lifetime Achievement	Won	
