= Hsiao Ya-chuan =

Taiwanese film director

- 蕭雅全
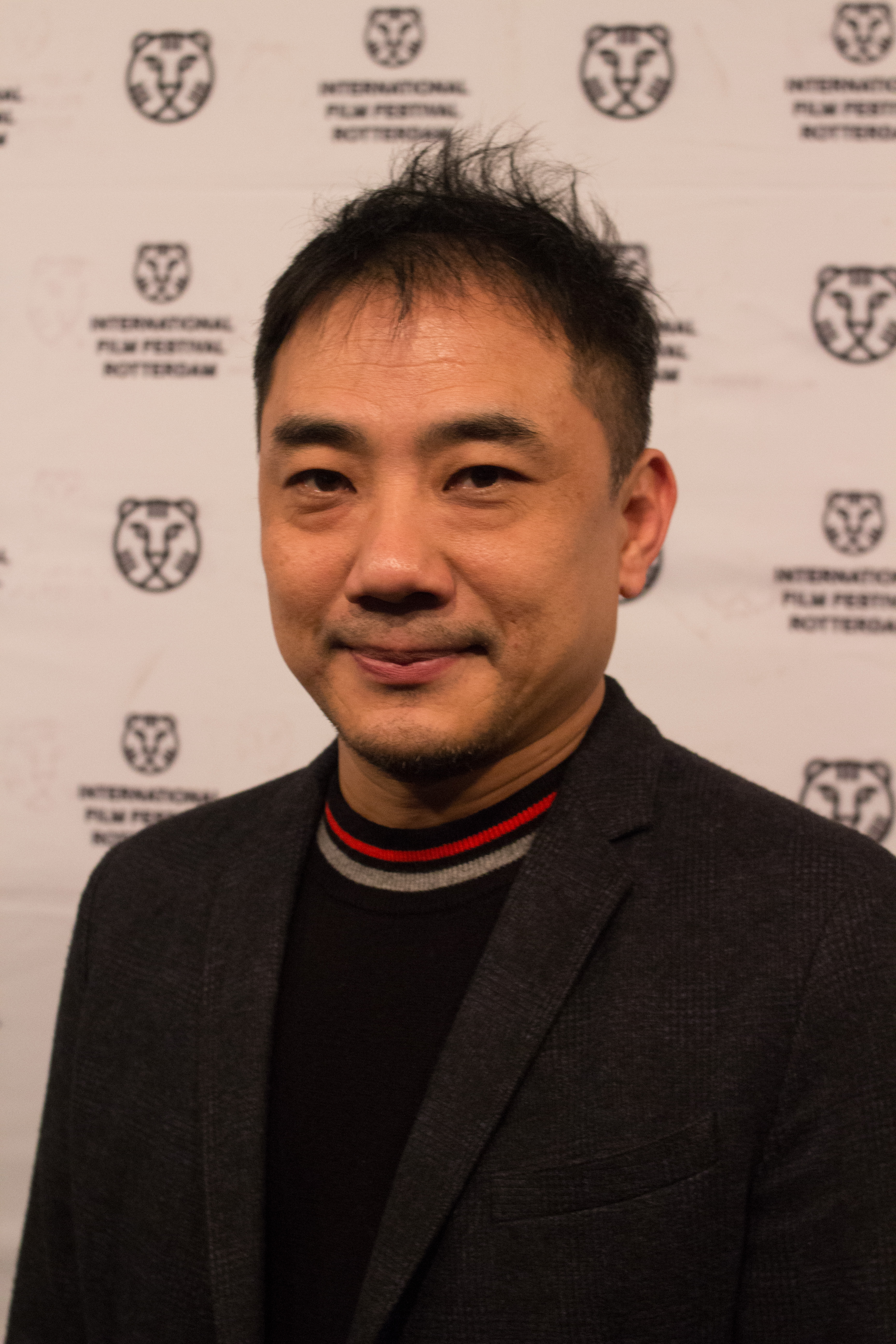
- Hsiao in January 2018 at the International Film Festival Rotterdam
- Born: 20 December 1967 (age 58); Changhua County, Taiwan
- Education: Taipei National University of the Arts
- Occupation: Film director
- Children: 2

Chinese name
- Traditional Chinese: 蕭雅全
- Simplified Chinese: 萧雅全
Transcriptions
Standard Mandarin
- Hanyu Pinyin: Xiāo Yǎquán

Hsiao Ya-chuan (Traditional Chinese: 蕭雅全; born 20 December 1967) is a Taiwanese film director.

== Career ==
Born in 1967, Hsiao attended what later became Taipei National University of the Arts. Commenting on his upbringing in 2018, Hsiao stated, "My father’s frugality created a sense of insecurity in me, as if the family could run out of money anytime. There was a feeling of poverty, where we never had enough to do the same things other people could." He began working closely with Hou Hsiao-hsien, and served as assistant director on Hou's Flowers of Shanghai (1998). Hou has produced several of Hsiao's films, including Mirror Image (2001), Taipei Exchanges (2010), Father to Son (2018), and Old Fox (2023).

Hsiao first feature film, Mirror Image, won the Best Film Award at the 2001 Taipei Film Festival and another prize at the Fukuoka Film Festival. It was also shown at the Cannes Film Festival in May. The next year, Mirror Image was shown as the opening feature at the Taipei Film House. Hsiao worked for a time directing television commercials, before releasing Taipei Exchanges in 2010. The production, commissioned by the Taipei City Government, was shown at the Taipei Film Festival. In 2012, Hsiao directed Something’s Gotta Give, a segment of the anthology film 10+10, which screened at the Berlin International Film Festival and Stockholm International Film Festival. Hsiao's third feature film Father to Son was nominated for a 2018 VPRO Big Screen Award. It premiered at the 2018 International Film Festival Rotterdam. For his 2023 film Old Fox, Hsiao won Best Director at the 60th Golden Horse Awards.

== Personal life ==
He has two children.
