= Wang Jui =

Taiwanese actor

- 王瑞
- Born: Wang Hsi-jui 王錫瑞; 25 July 1930; Taiwan
- Died: 1 June 2016 (aged 85); Taipei, Taiwan
- Spouse: 张秀芳
- Children: 1 daughter

Wang Hsi-jui (Chinese: 王錫瑞; 25 July 1930 – 1 June 2016), known by his stage name Wang Jui (王瑞), was a Taiwanese actor. He won the Golden Bell Award three times. Wang died in Taipei of heart and lung failure on 1 June 2016 at the age of 85.

== Selected filmography ==
- A Touch of Zen (1971)
- Eat Drink Man Woman (1994)
- Super Citizen Ko (1995)
- Island of Greed (1997)
