= Golden Bell Award for Best Supporting Actor in a Miniseries or Television Film =

- Location: Taiwan
- Presented by: Golden Bell Awards
- Currently held by: Huang Di-yang for To the Sea (2023)

This is a list of winners and nominees of the Golden Bell Award for Best Supporting Actor in a Miniseries or Television Film (Chinese: 金鐘獎迷你劇集(電視電影)男配角獎).

== Winners and nominees ==
=== 2010s ===
Year	Actor	English title	Original title	Ref
2017; 52nd Golden Bell Awards
2017; 52nd Golden Bell Awards	Wu Kun-da	Time to Say Goodbye	愛別離	
2017; 52nd Golden Bell Awards	Kao Meng-chieh	The Last Verse	最後的詩句	
2017; 52nd Golden Bell Awards	Chang Han	Upstream	濁流	
2017; 52nd Golden Bell Awards	Tsai Chen-nan	She's Family	媽媽不見了	
2017; 52nd Golden Bell Awards	Hsieh Fei	Their Heaven	TMD天堂	
2018; 53rd Golden Bell Awards
2018; 53rd Golden Bell Awards	Edison Song	Days We Stared at the Sun II	他們在畢業的前一天爆炸2	
2018; 53rd Golden Bell Awards	Lee Fu-chiun	PTS Innovative Story: The Stranger	公視學生劇展 — 一步之遙	
2018; 53rd Golden Bell Awards	Jay Shih	Ching's Way Homes	阿青,回家了	
2018; 53rd Golden Bell Awards	Jason King	Nguyen Thi Bich Hoa and Her Two Men	華視金選劇場 — 阮氏碧花與她的兩個男人	
2018; 53rd Golden Bell Awards	Lan Wei-hua	PTS Originals: Ping Pong	公視新創電影 — 乒乓	
2019; 54th Golden Bell Awards
2019; 54th Golden Bell Awards	Wu Hung Hsui	PTS Innovative Story: Vanquished	公視學生劇展－人鬼	
2019; 54th Golden Bell Awards	Jason King	PTS Life Story: Lady CaCa	公視人生劇展－淚滴卡卡	
2019; 54th Golden Bell Awards	Brando Huang	The Coming Through	奇蹟的女兒	
2019; 54th Golden Bell Awards	Tsai Ming-hsiu	A Cold Summer Day	華視金選劇場－夏之橘	
2019; 54th Golden Bell Awards	Soda Voyu	PTS Originals: Mystery in the Mist	公視新創電影－疑霧公堂	

=== 2020s ===
Year	Actress	English title	Original title	Ref
2020; 55th Golden Bell Awards
2020; 55th Golden Bell Awards	Tai-Bo Cheung	PTS Life Story: Viatical Settlement	公視人生劇展－殘值	
2020; 55th Golden Bell Awards	Po-chieh Wang	Nowhere Man	罪夢者	
2020; 55th Golden Bell Awards	Sean Sun	The Rootless	無主之子	
2020; 55th Golden Bell Awards	Yu An-shun	PTS Life Story: Ah Chin	公視人生劇展 — 盲人阿清	
2020; 55th Golden Bell Awards	Liao Chin-Liang	PTS Original Shorts: Lucky Draw	新創電影短片 — 大吉	
2021; 56th Golden Bell Awards
2021; 56th Golden Bell Awards	Hsueh Shih-ling	Workers	做工的人	
2022; 57th Golden Bell Awards
2022; 57th Golden Bell Awards	Bai Run-yin	More Than Blue: The Series	比悲傷更悲傷的故事：影集版	
2022; 57th Golden Bell Awards	Huang Guan-zhi	Undercurrent	降河洄游	
2022; 57th Golden Bell Awards	Duan Chun-hao	Twisted Strings	良辰吉時	
2023; 58th Golden Bell Awards
2023; 58th Golden Bell Awards	Pu Hsueh-liang	Wave Makers	人選之人—造浪者	
2023; 58th Golden Bell Awards	Hu Jhih-ciang	Revolting with Dragon	龔囝	
2023; 58th Golden Bell Awards	River Huang	The Leaking Bookstore	茁劇場-滴水的推理書屋	
2023; 58th Golden Bell Awards	Huang Di-yang	To the Sea	看海	
2023; 58th Golden Bell Awards	Leon Dai	Wave Makers	人選之人—造浪者	
2024; 59th Golden Bell Awards
2024; 59th Golden Bell Awards	Kai Ko	Imperfect Us	不夠善良的我們	
2024; 59th Golden Bell Awards	Wu Chien-ho	Let's Talk About Chu	愛愛內含光	
2024; 59th Golden Bell Awards	Lego Lee	Trade War	商魂	
2024; 59th Golden Bell Awards	Huang Di-yang	Hotel Saltwater	鹽水大飯店	
2024; 59th Golden Bell Awards	Yang Lie	Port of Lies	八尺門的辯護人	
