= 22nd New York Asian Film Festival =

Asian film festival in New York

- Official poster
- Opening film: Killing Romance by Lee Won-suk
- Location: Film at Lincoln Center, New York
- Founded: 2002
- Awards: Uncaged Award: Abang Adik by Jin Ong; Audience Award: Marry My Dead Body by Cheng Wei-hao; Star Asia Award: Ryohei Suzuki
- Hosted by: New York Asian Film Foundation Inc.
- Artistic director: Samuel Jamier
- No. of films: 78 films
- Festival date: Opening: 14 July 2023; Closing: 30 July 2023
- Language: International
- Website: NYAFF

New York Asian Film Festival
- 23rd 21st

The 22nd New York Asian Film Festival was held in New York on 14 July with North American premiere of South Korean film Killing Romance by Lee Won-suk, who attended the screening in person. In the 22nd edition seventy eight titles were screened in person. The lineup included eight world premieres, nine international premieres, thirty-two North American premieres, three U.S. premieres, and sixteen East Coast/New York premieres. Films from various genres from Hong Kong, Japan, China, South Korea, the Philippines, Malaysia, Indonesia, Taiwan, Thailand, Kazakhstan, Kyrgyzstan, Singapore, Vietnam, the United Kingdom, and the United States were screened.

In Star Asia Awards category, Asian stars were honoured with various awards such as: Louis Koo a Hong Kong actor, singer and film producer with Extraordinary Star Asia Award; Junji Sakamoto, a Japanese film director, with Screen International Star Asia Lifetime Achievement Award; Ryohei Suzuki, a Japanese actor, with Screen International Rising Star Asia Award; and Lee Hanee a South Korean actress, model, classical musician, with Best from the East Award.

The festival was closed on 30 July with Anthony Stacchi's animated Netflix film The Monkey King. It is the first time the festival has partnered with Netflix for the world premiere of a film, which was held before the August 18 worldwide release on Netflix. Malaysian film Abang Adik by Jin Ong won the Uncaged Award for best feature film. It is a directorial debut feature of Jin Ong and follows two orphaned brothers whose bond is tested after a brutal accident. The Audience Award was awarded to Taiwanese film Marry My Dead Body, a LGBTQ+ story from director Cheng Wei-hao. In his closing speech the NYAFF Executive Director and President of the New York Asian Film Foundation Samuel Jamier said, "2023 marked a giant leap forward for the festival, in terms of audience size (with a 35% increase in attendance, and the largest number of sold out screenings), numbers of films and guest filmmakers and actors (over 100 guests from Asia), a major partnership with Netflix and a whole new, expanded pool of donors."

== Jury ==
- Po-Chih Leong: British-Chinese film director. He has worked in England, Hong Kong, and the United States.
- Rebecca Choi: VP, Narrative Film at Archer Gray, a media company in New York City, New York.
- Anna Isabella Matutina: A filmmaker, documentarian and editor based in the Philippines.
- Chieko Murata: Co-producer at The Japan Broadcasting Corporation, (NHK)
- Donsaron Kovitvanitcha: A film writer, critic, journalist and independent film producer based in Thailand.
- Ko Mori: A film producer and the founding CEO of Los Angeles-based Eleven Arts Studio.
- Lauren Yee: An American playwright, screenwriter and TV writer whose many acclaimed plays include Cambodian Rock Band and The Great Leap (2018).

== Screening venues ==
- Film at Lincoln Center
- Barrymore Film Center, Fort Lee, New Jersey

== Films showcase ==
Year	Title	Original Title	Country	Director	Premiere Status
Opening film
2023	Killing Romance	킬링 로맨스	South Korea	Lee Won-suk	North American Premiere
Beyond Borders
2022	Mountain Woman	山女	Japan	Takeshi Fukunaga	North American Premiere
2022	The Sunny Side of the Street	白日青春	Hong Kong	Lau Kok-rui	New York Premiere
2022	A Tour Guide	믿을 수 있는 사람	South Korea	Kwak Eun-mi	North American Premiere
Centerpiece Presentation
2023	Dream	드림	South Korea	Lee Byeong-heon	International Premiere
China On the Move
2023	Art College 1994	艺术学院	China	Liu Jian	North American Premiere
2022	The Cord of Life	脐带	China	Qiao Sixue	New York Premiere
2020	Empty Nest	空巢	China	Zhang Wei	New York Premiere
2014	Factory Boss	打工老板	China	Zhang Wei	Special Screening
2023	Flaming Cloud	三贵情史	China	Liu Siyi	World Premiere
2023	Redemption with Life	兄弟	China	Zhang Wei	World Premiere
2018	The Rib (Director's Cut)	肋骨	China	Zhang Wei	Special Screening
2022	A Woman	孔秀	China	Wang Chao	North American Premiere
Closing film
2023	The Monkey King		United States	Anthony Stacchi	World Premiere
Crowd Pleasers
2023	Bear Man	웅남이	South Korea	Park Sung-kwang	North American Premiere
2022	Gaga	웅남이	Taiwan	Laha Mebow	East Coast Premiere
2022	I Love You, Beksman	Mahal Kita, Beksman	Philippines	Percival Intalan	North American Premiere
2022	Marry My Dead Body	關於我和鬼變成家人的那件事	Taiwan	Cheng Wei-hao	East Coast Premiere
2023	Rebound	리바운드	South Korea	Jang Hang-jun	New York Premiere
Diasporic Discoveries
2023	A-Town Boyz		USA	Eunice Lau	World Premiere
2023	The Effects of Lying		United Kingdom	Isher Sahota	North American Premiere
2023	Shaky Shivers		USA	Sung Kang	East Coast Premiere
Frontlines
2022	12 Weeks		Philippines	Anna Isabelle Matutina Estein	International Premiere
2022	December	赦し	Japan	Anshul Chauhan	North American Premiere
2023	Eye of the Storm	疫起	Taiwan	Lin Chun-Yang	International Premiere
2022	Glorious Ashes	Tro Tàn Rực Rỡ	Vietnam	Bui Thac Chuyên	North American Premiere
2023	In Broad Daylight	白日之下	Hong Kong	Lawrence Kan	North American Premiere
2023	Vital Signs	送院途中	Hong Kong	Cheuk Wan-chi	North American Premiere
Genre Masters
2023	#Manhole	#マンホール	Japan	Kazuyoshi Kumakiri	East Coast Premiere
2022	Geylang	芽籠	Singapore	Boi Kwong	North American Premiere
2023	Kitty the Killer	อีหนูอันตราย	Thailand	Lee Thongkham	International Premiere
2023	Mad Fate	命案	Hong Kong	Cheang Pou-soi	North American Premiere
2023	Miss Shampoo	請問，還有哪裡需要加強	Taiwan	Giddens Ko	North American Premiere
2023	The White Storm 3: Heaven or Hell	掃毒3人在天涯	Hong Kong	Herman Yau	North American Premiere
Narrative Shorts Showcase - Animation
2022	What We Leave Behind		South Korea	Kang Nam-jin	International Premiere
2022	Borderline		South Korea	Kong Son-hee	World Premiere
2023	Confusion of the Afternoon	午後的迷茫	Taiwan	Yung-Chieh Lee	East Coast Premiere
2023	Goose Mountain	鹅鹅鹅	China	Hu Rui, Chen Liaoyu	
2022	Handwritten		USA	Jaime Sunwoo	New York Premiere
2023	Hidari	HIDARI	Japan	Iku Ogawa, Masashi Kawamura	
Narrative Shorts Showcase - Live Action
2022	All Your Fault, PD	피디님이 책임지세요	South Korea	Kim Sun-yeun	North American Premiere
2022	Fix Anything		Vietnam	Lê Lâm Viên	North American Premiere
2022	Infant (Perzent)		Kyrgyzstan	Karash Zhanyshov	U. S. Premiere
2023	Kumbang (Bugs)		Malaysia	Gwai Lou	World Premiere
2023	Neo Portraits		Japan	Gazebo	International Premiere
2023	Pufferfish		Iran	Mohamad Kamal Alavi	World Premiere
2022	Resellers	대리구매	South Korea	Lee Seung-ju	International Premiere
2023	A Roadside Banquet	鸡毛掸子	United States, China	Peiqi Peng	East Coast Premiere
2023	Sweet Refuge		United States	Maryam Mir	East Coast Premiere
2022	Will You Look At Me	当我望向你的时候	China	Shuli Huang	
Next/Now
2022	Bad Education	黑的教育	Taiwan	Kai Ko	North American Premiere
2022	The Cord of Life	脐带	China	Qiao Sixue	New York Premiere
2023	Extreme Festival	익스트림 페스티벌	South Korea	Kim Hong-ki	International Premiere
2022	Hail to Hell	지옥만세	South Korea	Lim Oh-jeong	North American Premiere
2022	A Light Never Goes Out	燈火闌珊	Hong Kong	Anastasia Tsang	U.S. Premiere
2022	Mayhem Girls	メイヘムガールズ	Shinichi Fujita	Japan	International Premiere
2023	You & Me & Me	เธอกับฉันกับฉัน	Thailand	Wanweaw and Weawwan Hongvivatana	North American Premiere
Standouts
2023	Art College 1994	艺术学院	China	Liu Jian	North American Premiere
2023	Egoist	エゴイスト	Japan	Daishi Matsunaga, Daishi Matsunaga	New York Premiere
2022	A Hundred Flowers	百花	Japan	Genki Kawamura	New York Premiere
2022	Motherhood	母性	Japan	Ryuichi Hiroki	U.S. Premiere
2023	Phantom	유령	South Korea	Lee Hae-young	North American Premiere
2022	A Woman	孔秀	China	Wang Chao	North American Premiere
Vanguards
2023	Everyphone Everywhere	全個世界都有電話	Hong Kong	Amos Why	North American Premiere
2022	In Her Room	ひとりぼっちじゃない	Japan	Chihiro Ito	North American Premiere
1982	Nomad (Director's Cut)	烈火青春（導演版）	Hong Kong	Patrick Tam	East Coast Premiere
2023	Okiku and the World	せかいのおきく	Japan	Junji Sakamoto	North American Premiere
2023	Where Is The Lie?	Marupok AF	Philippines	Quark Henares	North American Premiere

== Films by country or region ==
Year	Title	Original Title	Director	Premiere status
Hong Kong Panorama
2023	Back Home	七月返歸	Nate Ki	World Premiere
2023	Everyphone Everywhere	全個世界都有電話	Amos Why	North American Premiere
2023	In Broad Daylight	白日之下	Lawrence Kan	North American Premiere
2022	A Light Never Goes Out	燈火闌珊	Anastasia Tsang	U.S. Premiere
2023	Mad Fate	命案	Cheang Pou-soi	North American Premiere
1982	Nomad (Director's Cut)	烈火青春（導演版）	Patrick Tam	East Coast Premiere
2022	The Sunny Side of the Street	白日青春	Lau Kok-rui	New York Premiere
2023	The White Storm 3: Heaven or Hell	掃毒3人在天涯	Herman Yau	North American Premiere
2023	Vital Signs	送院途中	Cheuk Wan-chi	North American Premiere
New Cinema from Japan
2023	#Manhole	#マンホール	Kazuyoshi Kumakiri	East Coast Premiere
2022	December	赦し	Anshul Chauhan	North American Premiere
2023	Egoist	エゴイスト	Daishi Matsunaga, Daishi Matsunaga	New York Premiere
2023	Home Sweet Home	スイート・マイホーム	Takumi Saitoh	North American Premiere
2022	A Hundred Flowers	百花	Genki Kawamura	New York Premiere
2022	In Her Room	ひとりぼっちじゃない	Chihiro Ito	North American Premiere
2022	Mayhem Girls	メイヘムガールズ	Shinichi Fujita	International Premiere
2022	Motherhood	母性	Ryuichi Hiroki	U.S. Premiere
2022	Mountain Woman	山女	Takeshi Fukunaga	North American Premiere
2023	Okiku and the World	せかいのおきく	Junji Sakamoto	North American Premiere
South Korea at the Forefront
2023	Bear Man	웅남이	Park Sung-kwang	North American Premiere
2023	Dream	드림	Lee Byeong-heon	International Premiere
2023	Extreme Festival	익스트림 페스티벌	Kim Hong-ki	International Premiere
2022	Greenhouse	비닐하우스	Lee Sol-hui	North American Premiere
2022	Hail to Hell	지옥만세	Lim Oh-jeong	North American Premiere
2006	The Host	괴물	Bong Joon Ho	Special Screening
2023	Killing Romance	킬링 로맨스	Lee Won-suk	North American Premiere
2023	Phantom	유령	Lee Hae-young	North American Premiere
2023	Rebound	리바운드	Jang Hang-jun	New York Premiere
2022	A Tour Guide	믿을 수 있는 사람	Kwak Eun-mi	North American Premiere
Taiwan Transcendent
2022	The Abandoned	查無此心	Tseng Ying-ting	North American Premiere
2022	Bad Education	黑的教育	Kai Ko	North American Premiere
2023	Eye of the Storm	疫起	Lin Chun-Yang	International Premiere
2022	Gaga	웅남이	Laha Mebow	East Coast Premiere
2022	Marry My Dead Body	關於我和鬼變成家人的那件事	Cheng Wei-hao	East Coast Premiere
2023	Miss Shampoo	請問，還有哪裡需要加強	Giddens Ko	North American Premiere

Year	Title	Original Title	Country	Director	Premiere status
Southeast Asia On the Rise
2022	12 Weeks		Philippines	Anna Isabelle Matutina Estein	International Premiere
2023	Abang Adik	富都青年	Malaysia	Jin Ong	North American Premiere
2023	Faces of Anne	แอน	Thailand	Rasiguet Sookkarn, Kongdej Jaturanrasmee	North American Premiere
2022	Geylang	芽籠	Singapore	Boi Kwong	North American Premiere
2022	Glorious Ashes	Tro Tàn Rực Rỡ	Vietnam	Bui Thac Chuyên	North American Premiere
2022	I Love You, Beksman	Mahal Kita, Beksman	Philippines	Percival Intalan	North American Premiere
2023	Kitty the Killer	อีหนูอันตราย	Thailand	Lee Thongkham	International Premiere
2023	Where Is the Lie?	Marupok AF	Philippines	Quark Henares	North American Premiere
2023	You & Me & Me	เธอกับฉันกับฉัน	Thailand	Wanweaw and Weawwan Hongvivatana	North American Premiere

== Uncaged Award for Best Feature Film Competition ==
Highlighted title indicates the Uncaged Award for best feature film winner.

Year	Title	Original Title	Country	Director	Premiere Status
The Uncaged Award nominees
2022	The Abandoned	查無此心	Taiwan	Tseng Ying-ting	North American Premiere
2023	Abang Adik	富都青年	Malaysia	Jin Ong	North American Premiere
2023	Back Home	七月返歸	Hong Kong	Nate Ki	World Premiere
2023	Faces of Anne	แอน	Thailand	Rasiguet Sookkarn, Kongdej Jaturanrasmee	North American Premiere
2023	Flaming Cloud	三贵情史	China	Liu Siyi	World Premiere
2022	Greenhouse	비닐하우스	South Korea	Lee Sol-hui	North American Premiere
2023	Home Sweet Home	スイート・マイホーム	Japan	Takumi Saitoh	North American Premiere
2022	Mountain Onion	Gornyi Luk	Kazakhstan	Eldar Shibanov	North American Premiere
2023	Redemption with Life	兄弟	China	Zhang Wei	World Premiere

== Awards and winners ==
=== Uncaged Award for Best Feature Film ===
Year	Title	Original Title	Country	Director/Actor	Ref.
2023	Abang Adik	富都青年	Malaysia	Jin Ong	
Special Mention
2022	Greenhouse	비닐하우스	South Korea	Lee Sol-hui	
2023	Flaming Cloud	三贵情史	China	Liu Siyi	

=== Audience Award ===
Year	Title	Original Title	Country	Director/Actor	Ref.
2022	Marry My Dead Body	關於我和鬼變成家人的那件事	Taiwan	Cheng Wei-hao	

=== Daniel Craft Award for Excellence in Action Cinema ===
Actor	Country	Film/s	Ref.
Lee Thongkham	Thailand	Kitty the Killer	

=== Star Asia Awards ===
Image	Recipient	Country	Ref.
Extraordinary Star Asia Award
	Louis Koo	Hong Kong	
Screen International Star Asia Lifetime Achievement Award
	Junji Sakamoto	Japan	
Screen International Rising Star Asia Award
	Ryohei Suzuki	Japan	
Best from the East Award
	Lee Hanee	South Korea	
