= Kissing the Ground You Walked On =

- Promotional poster
- Traditional Chinese: 海鷗來過的房間
- Simplified Chinese: 海鸥来过的房间
- Literal meaning: "The room where the seagulls came"
- Hanyu Pinyin: Hǎi ōu lái guò de fáng jiān
- Directed by: Hong Heng-fai
- Starring: Wong Pak-hou; Lam Sheung
- Production company: Dayday Studio
- Distributed by: Swallow Wings Films (Taiwan)
- Release date: 11 November 2022 (Taiwan)
- Running time: 93 minutes
- Country: Macau
- Language: Cantonese

Kissing the Ground You Walked On (Chinese: 海鷗來過的房間) is a 2022 Macanese drama film directed by Hong Heng-fai. It received three nominations at the 59th Golden Horse Awards, including Best New Director for Hong Heng-fai. Hong became the first Macanese director to be nominated for the award. In an interview, Taipei Golden Horse Film Festival's Executive Committee head Wen Tien-hsiang described Hong's directorial style as "Ryusuke Hamaguchi meets Tsai Ming-liang".

== Premise ==
A story revolving around two men: a half-retired young novelist and his tenant. There is a day when the novelist gets an opportunity to write a new book. While he is contemplating his new masterpiece, he has an internal struggle as to what his ideal is like. Here comes his tenant, a young man who eventually gives him inspirations not only on his upcoming book, but also on his vision of life, through an intriguing relation intertwining the two men.

— Macau Daily Times

== Cast ==
- Wong Pak-hou
- Lam Sheung

== Awards and nominations ==
Awards	Category	Recipient	Result	Ref.
59th Golden Horse Awards	Best New Director	Hong Heng-fai	Nominated	
59th Golden Horse Awards	Best Cinematography	Charlie Sou	Nominated	
59th Golden Horse Awards	Best Sound Effects	Ellison Lau Chi-keong	Nominated	
59th Golden Horse Awards	FIPRESCI Prize	Kissing the Ground You Walked On	Nominated	
59th Golden Horse Awards	NETPAC Award	Kissing the Ground You Walked On	Nominated	
59th Golden Horse Awards	Observation Missions for Asian Cinema Award	Kissing the Ground You Walked On	Nominated	
47th Hong Kong International Film Festival	Firebird Awards (Chinese-language)	Kissing the Ground You Walked On	Nominated	
