= The Abandoned (2022 film) =

- Promotional banner
- Traditional Chinese: 查無此心
- Simplified Chinese: 查无此心
- Literal meaning: "No trace of the heart"
- Hanyu Pinyin: Chá wú cǐ xīn
- Directed by: Tseng Ying-ting
- Written by: Tseng Ying-ting; Yang Yi-chien; Lin Pin-chun; Hsu Shih-hui
- Produced by: David Tang; Janine Chang
- Starring: Janine Chang; Ethan Juan
- Production company: Renaissance Films et.al
- Distributed by: Netflix (United States)
- Release dates: October 22, 2022 (London East Asia); September 8, 2023 (Taiwan)
- Running time: 128 minutes
- Country: Taiwan
- Languages: Mandarin; Thai

The Abandoned (Chinese: 查無此心) is a 2022 Taiwanese mystery crime thriller film directed and co-written by Tseng Ying-ting.

== Premise ==
On New Year's Eve, a corpse washed up on the shore stops Wu Jie, the police officer, when she is ready to kill herself. The victim was a migrant worker without her heart and a finger. It is obviously a murder. Police get no more clues from the body. In the meantime, they get an anonymous call, which complicates the case. Wu Jie concludes that whoever abandoned the body is not the killer. Lin You-sheng is in trouble because a female dead body has been found in a factory. To avoid the police, he buries the body in the mountains by himself. In the meantime, his girlfriend, Waree, has lost touch. Wu Jie finds Lin and asks him to identify a body that turns out to be Waree's. Lin is seen as the prime suspect of the serial murders.

== Cast ==
- Janine Chang as Wu Jie
- Ethan Juan as Lin You-sheng
- Chloe Xiang as Wilson
- Sajee Apiwong
- Hsueh Shih-ling as Huang Dong-qi
- Chen Wei-min as Sheriff

== Release ==
The film was screened in the London East Asia Film Festival (LEAFF)'s Competition section on October 22, 2022, followed by its Taiwanese premiere at the Taipei Golden Horse Film Festival on November 5.

== Awards and nominations ==
Awards	Category	Recipient	Result	Ref.
59th Golden Horse Awards	Best New Director	Tseng Ying-ting	Nominated	
59th Golden Horse Awards	Best Art Direction	Yeh Tzu-wei	Nominated	
59th Golden Horse Awards	Best Makeup & Costume Design	Lore Shih and Chang Fu-chen	Nominated	
59th Golden Horse Awards	Best Action Choreography	Hung Shih-hao	Nominated	
59th Golden Horse Awards	Best Sound Effects	R.T Kao, Tsai Doit and Kenny Cheng	Nominated	
59th Golden Horse Awards	FIPRESCI Prize	The Abandoned	Nominated	
Taipei Film Awards 2023
Taipei Film Awards 2023	Best Feature Film	The Abandoned	Nominated	
Taipei Film Awards 2023	Best Director	Tseng Ying-ting	Nominated	
Taipei Film Awards 2023	Best Screenplay	Yang Yi-Chien, Lin Pin-jun, Xu Shihui, Tseng Ying-ting	Nominated	
Taipei Film Awards 2023	Best Actress	Ning Chang	Nominated	
Taipei Film Awards 2023	Best Supporting Actor	Chen Wei-min	Nominated	
Taipei Film Awards 2023	Best Cinematography	Liu Zhihuan, Liu Chenwei	Nominated	
Taipei Film Awards 2023	Best Editing	Liao Ching-Sung, Li Junhong	Nominated	
Taipei Film Awards 2023	Best Original Score	Yang Wanqian	Won	
Taipei Film Awards 2023	Best Art Design	Yeh Tzu-wei	Nominated	
Taipei Film Awards 2023	Best Design	Lore Shih, Victor Chang	Won	
Taipei Film Awards 2023	Best Sound Design	R.T Kao, Tsai Doit and Kenny Cheng	Nominated	
Taipei Film Awards 2023	Best Visual Effects	Jonah West, Wang Baixin	Nominated	
