= He Shuming =

Singaporean director and screenwriter

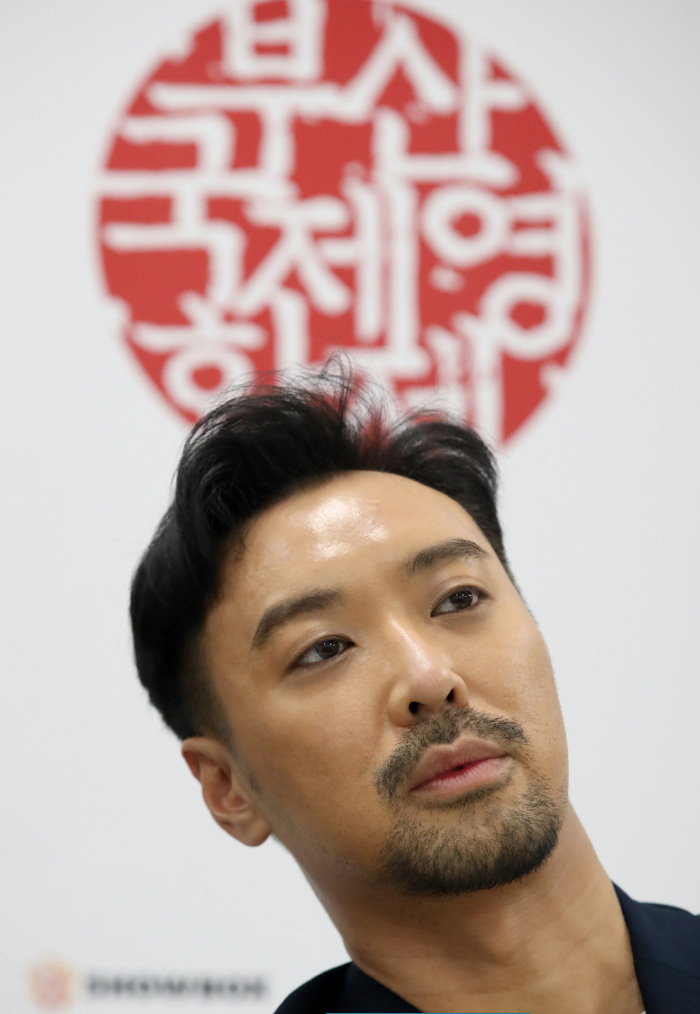
- He at the 27th Busan International Film Festival
- Born: 31 December 1985 (age 40); Singapore
- Education: LASALLE College of the Arts (BA), AFI Conservatory (MFA)
- Occupations: Film director; screenwriter
- Years active: 2010–present

He Shuming (Chinese: 何书铭; born 31 December 1985) is a Singaporean film director and screenwriter. He is known for his 2022 feature film Ajoomma.

His debut feature film, Ajoomma, premiered in competition in the New Currents section at the 27th Busan International Film Festival. It was nominated for 4 Golden Horse Awards, including Best New Director and Best Original Screenplay. The film was selected as the Singaporean entry for the Best International Feature Film at the 95th Academy Awards.

== Early life and education ==
He was born 31 December 1985 in Singapore. He attended Maris Stella High School. After serving his National Service, he attended Puttnam School of Film and Animation at the LASALLE College of the Arts where he received his Bachelor's in Film in 2010. He received his Master of Fine Arts from AFI Conservatory as a Directing Fellow.

== Career ==
He enrolled in the AFI Conservatory as Directing Fellow in 2012, where he made several short films. He also began developing Ajoomma at the Conservatory.

=== Ajoomma ===
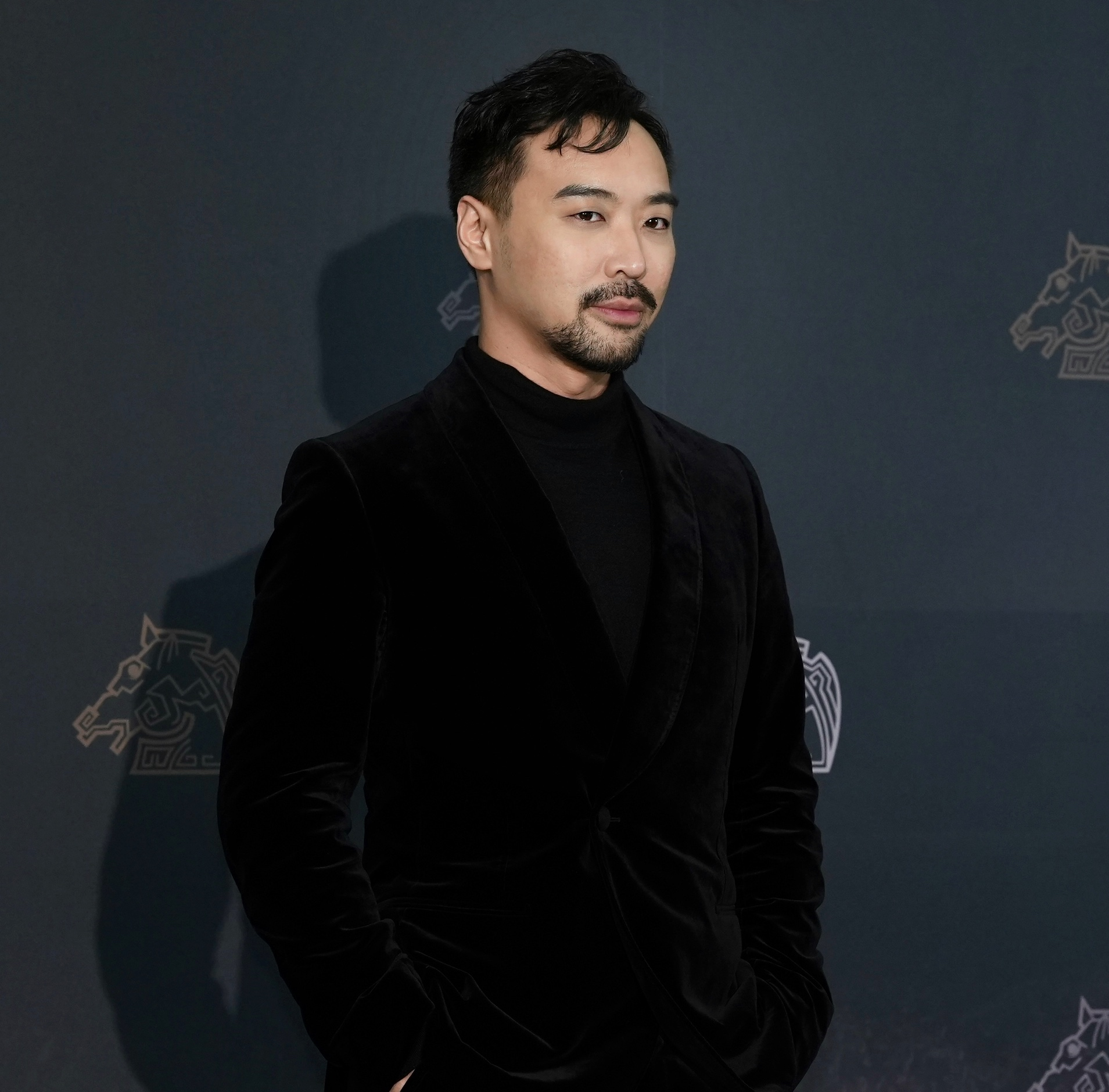
He at the 59th Golden Horse Awards

Ajoomma was developed when he was living in Los Angeles while attending AFI Conservatory. He was inspired by his mother, who was a huge fan of Korean dramas. He submitted a treatment to the Southeast Asian Film Lab at the 25th Singapore International Film Festival, where it won Most Promising Project. Anthony Chen, whom he's known for many years prior, boarded the project as a producer.

He cast Hong Huifang as the lead, and the film went into production early 2022, before premiering at the 22nd Busan International Film Festival in the New Currents Competition section. The film also received 4 nominations at the 59th Golden Horse Awards, including Best New Director, Best Original Screenplay, Best Leading Actress and Best Supporting Actor.
