= Sharon Kao =

Taiwanese actress

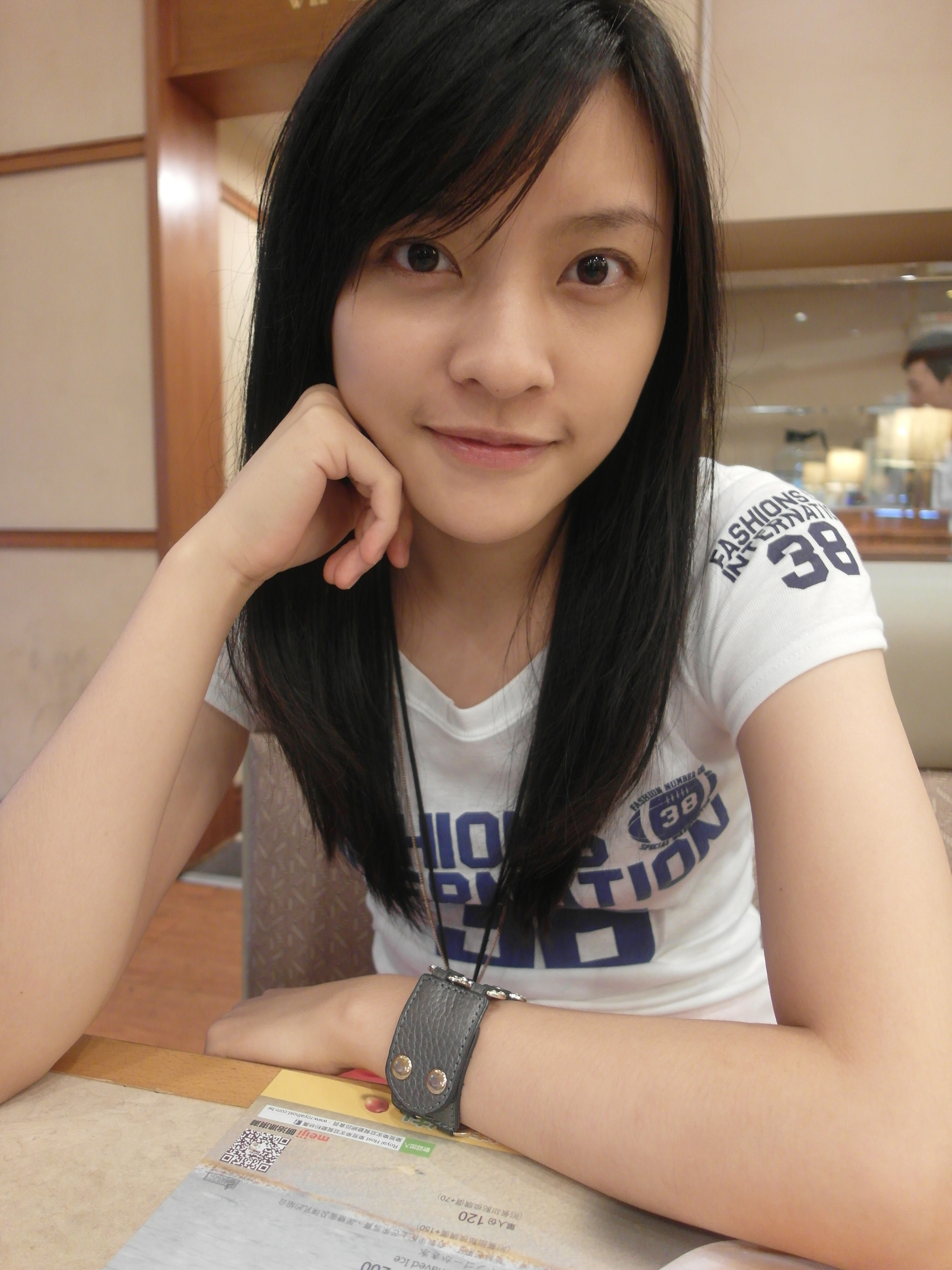
- Kao in 2013
- Born: 高靖榕; Kao Sharon; 22 August 1991 (age 34); Taipei, Taiwan
- Citizenship: Taiwan; United States
- Occupation: Actress
- Years active: 2006–present
- Spouse: Daniel Liu (m. 2017)
- Awards: Best New Talent of Taipei Film Awards (2016)

Chinese name
- Traditional Chinese: 高靖榕
Transcriptions
Standard Mandarin
- Hanyu Pinyin: Gāo Jìng-Róng

Sharon Kao (Chinese: 高靖榕; pinyin: Gāo Jìng-Róng; Wade–Giles: Kao Jing-rong; born 22 August 1991) is a Taiwanese actress. She is mixed with Bunun descent (Austronesian) and Chinese. In 2006, she starred in a TV series Curly Hair produced by Public Television Service Taiwan. She starred in Leaving Gracefully in 2011. In 2014, she made a cameo appearance in Lucy as a TV News Reporter which directed by Luc Besson. In 2016, she starred in Lokah Laqi and won Best New Talent at the 18th Taipei Film Awards. She got married in 2017 in California. Her aunt is Taiwanese singer Sammi Kao.

== Filmography ==
=== Film ===
Year	Title	Director	Role
2011	Leaving Gracefully	Peng Qia-Qia	Huang Xiao-Chi
2014	Lucy	Luc Besson	TV Reporter
2016	Hang in There, Kids!	Laha Mebow	Lin En-ya

=== Television series ===
Year	Title	Role
2006	Curly Hair	Qian Yun
2009	Happy Together	Wang Yi-qian
2009	Night Market Life	A hua
2010	Let Love Fly	Hsiao-jun
2010	Year of the Rain	Ya
2012	In Between	Wen Xiang-jun
2013	The Dangerous City	Hsiao-juan
2013	My Summer Adventure	Hsiao-wei
2014	Family Matter	Hsiao-mon
2014	I'm Beautiful	TV anchor
2014	Love Mile	Wan Xiu-feng
2014	Psychic Partner	Hsiao-Yo
2014	Brave Forward	Tseng Su-min
2015	Until Sunlight	Yuma
2015	Sunset	Liu Hsiao-hung

=== Animation shows ===
Year	Title	Role
2018	Kitty is a Not Cat	Kitty
