= Coo-Coo 043 =

- Promotional poster
- Traditional Chinese: 一家子兒咕咕叫
- Simplified Chinese: 一家子儿咕咕叫
- Literal meaning: "A family that coos"
- Hanyu Pinyin: Yī jiā zǐ er gū gū jiào
- Directed by: Chan Ching-lin
- Written by: Chan Ching-lin
- Produced by: Lin I-Ling; Lin Shih-ken
- Starring: Yu An-shun; Yang Li-yin; Hu Jhih-ciang; Rimong Ihwar
- Cinematography: Chen Chi-wen
- Edited by: Chan Ching-lin; Ian Lin; Chen Pei-ying
- Music by: Point Hsu
- Production company: Atom Cinema
- Distributed by: A Really Happy Film (Taipei)
- Release dates: November 2, 2022 (Taipei Golden Horse); November 18, 2022
- Running time: 135 minutes
- Country: Taiwan
- Languages: Mandarin; Taiwanese

Coo-Coo 043 (Chinese: 一家子兒咕咕叫) is a 2022 Taiwanese drama film written and directed by Chan Ching-lin. Set in the world of pigeon racing, it revolves around a struggling family who relies on the sport for a living, as they face the threat of an economic downturn and the disappearance of their son. It was selected as the opening film of the 2022 Taipei Golden Horse Film Festival.

It won Best Narrative Feature at the 59th Golden Horse Awards.

== Cast ==
- Yu An-shun as Ching
- Yang Li-yin as Min
- Hu Jhih-ciang as Hsiao-hu
- Rimong Ihwar as Meng-lu
- Yang Ching-huang as Priest

== Production ==
Coo-Coo 043 was chosen as one of the Golden Horse Film Project Promotion Work-In-Progress Projects in 2021. It is the follow-up work to Chan's debut feature The Island That All Flow By which scored Best New Director and Best Leading Actress nominations at the 54th Golden Horse Awards. Chan was also previously nominated for Golden Horse Award for Best Live Action Short Film for A Breath from the Bottom in 2013.

== Awards and nominations ==
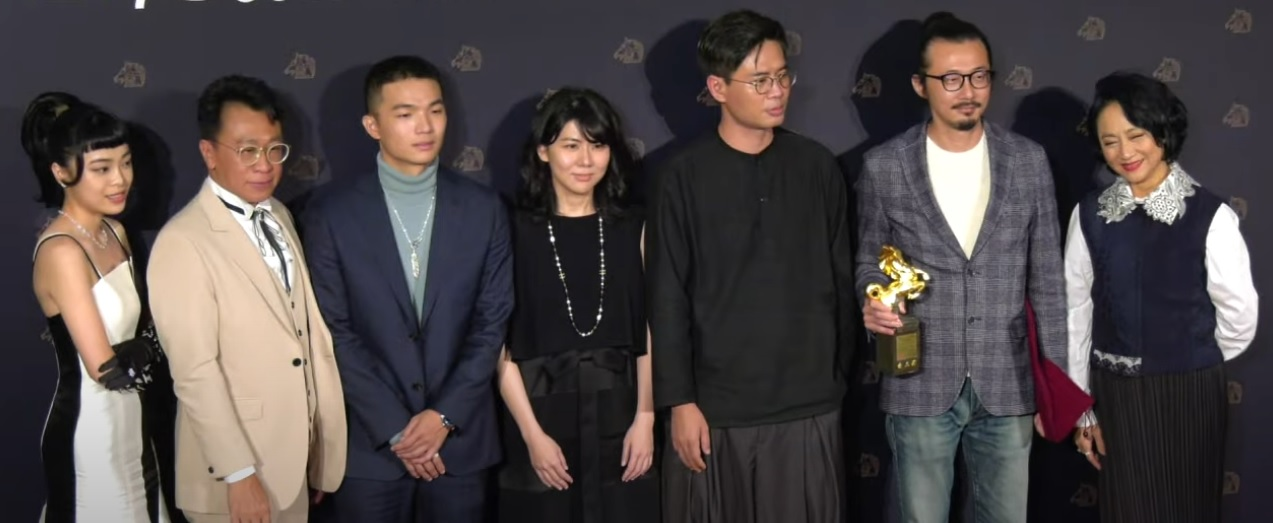
Cast and crew members at the 59th Golden Horse Awards

| Awards | Category | Recipient | Result | Ref. |
|---|---|---|---|---|
| 59th Golden Horse Awards | Best Narrative Feature | Coo-Coo 043 | Won | |
| 59th Golden Horse Awards | Best Director | Chan Ching-lin | Nominated | |
| 59th Golden Horse Awards | Best Leading Actor | Yu An-shun | Nominated | |
| 59th Golden Horse Awards | Best Supporting Actor | Hu Jhih-ciang | Nominated | |
| 59th Golden Horse Awards | Best Supporting Actress | Yang Li-yin | Nominated | |
| 59th Golden Horse Awards | Best Supporting Actress | Rimong Ihwar | Nominated | |
| 59th Golden Horse Awards | Best New Performer | Hu Jhih-ciang | Won | |
| 59th Golden Horse Awards | Best Original Screenplay | Chan Ching-lin | Nominated | |
| 59th Golden Horse Awards | Best Art Direction | Chang Yi-feng | Nominated | |
| 59th Golden Horse Awards | Best Makeup & Costume Design | Emma Chen | Nominated | |
| 59th Golden Horse Awards | Best Original Film Score | Point Hsu | Nominated | |
| 59th Golden Horse Awards | Best Film Editing | Chan Ching-lin, Ian Lin and Chen Pei-ying | Nominated | |
| 59th Golden Horse Awards | Best Sound Effects | Tu Duu-chih, Chiang Yi-chen, Chen Yu-chieh | Nominated | |
| 59th Golden Horse Awards | Audience Choice Award | Coo-Coo 043 | Nominated | |
| 59th Golden Horse Awards | FIPRESCI Prize | Coo-Coo 043 | Won | |
| 59th Golden Horse Awards | NETPAC Award | Coo-Coo 043 | Nominated | |
| 59th Golden Horse Awards | Observation Missions for Asian Cinema Award | Coo-Coo 043 | Nominated | |
