= Art College 1994 =

2023 animated film

- Promotional poster
- Directed by: Liu Jian
- Screenplay by: Lin Shan; Liu Jian
- Produced by: Yang Cheng; Shen Lihui; Gao Shiming
- Starring: Jia Zhangke
- Edited by: Liu Jian
- Music by: David Wen-Wei Liang; Sun Yunfan; Cui Jian; Alex Liu; Chen Li
- Animation by: Li Jiajia
- Production companies: Nezha Bros. Pictures Company Limited; Modern Sky Entertainment Company Limited; China Academy Of Art's School of Animation and Game
- Distributed by: Memento International
- Release dates: 24 February 2023 (Berlinale); 21 June 2025 (China)
- Running time: 118 minutes
- Country: China
- Language: Mandarin

Art College 1994 (Chinese: 艺术学院1994; pinyin: Yìshù Xuéyuàn 1994) is a 2023 Chinese animated drama film directed by Liu Jian. Set on the campus of the Chinese Southern Academy of Arts in the early 1990s, featuring a group of art students caught between tradition and modernity, as love and friendships are intertwined with their artistic pursuits, ideals and ambitions. The film features the voices of Jia Zhangke, Zheng Dasheng, Xu Lei, film producer Wang Hongwei, musicians Peng Lei and Ren Ke, academic Xu Zhiyuan, and Shen Lihui.

It was selected to compete for the Golden Bear at the 73rd Berlin International Film Festival, where it had its world premiere on 24 February 2023.

== Voice cast ==
- Jia Zhangke
- Zheng Dasheng
- Xu Lei
- Wang Hongwei
- Peng Lei
- Ren Ke
- Xu Zhiyuan
- Shen Lihui
- Dong Zijian
- Zhou Dongyu
- Chizi
- Papi Jiang
- Huang Bo
- Bai Ke
- Bi Gan
- Kevin Tsai

== Production ==
Art College 1994 is the third animated film by Chinese artist and filmmaker Liu Jian. The animated film is produced by Yang Cheng, who produced Liu's previous film Have a Nice Day (2017), and backed by the production companies Nezha Bros. Pictures, Modern Sky Entertainment, and the Animation and Game Development Department of the China Academy of Art, where Liu teaches as a professor. Commenting on the film, producer Yang Cheng said, "It took director Liu Jian five years to create this film with his iconic artistic style and true sensibility," He further said, "Both as an animated film and as an arthouse film, it's very unique."

The film is a 2D hand-drawn animated film produced by a team of teachers and students at the China Academy of Art. According to the academy, the film possesses "aesthetics that exhibit distinctive Chinese elements, and is a significant creative and pedagogical product of Academy's pursuit of ‘neorealistic animation'".

== Release ==
The film had its world premiere at the 73rd Berlin International Film Festival on 24 February 2023. Paris-based Memento International has secured global sales rights for the film.

In July 2023 it had its North American Premiere in 'China on the move' section at the 22nd New York Asian Film Festival on July 16, 2023. It was also selected in Animation section of the 36th Tokyo International Film Festival and was screened on 25 October 2023.

== Reception ==
Wendy Ide for ScreenDaily wrote in review, that the film, "evokes a specific time and a place so vividly that you can almost taste the stale cigarette smoke and cheap beer." Ide added, "But perhaps the most pertinent message is Rabbit's claim that anything can be art, something that Liu demonstrates throughout the picture, with the beauty he finds in the banality of the everyday object: the peeling paint, the broken windows, the stag beetle's futile attempts to scale a wall." James Mottram of South China Morning Post rated the film with 3 stars out of 5 and wrote, "Liu's unique animation style is stunning, made more so with odd artistic flourishes such as a painting of Lili filled with babies, fish, cameras and more." Mottram added, "And for all its flaws, it's still a one-off in the world of animation." Leslie Felperin reviewing at the Berlin Film Festival for The Hollywood Reporter called the film "Endearing, if you can take the dorm-room philosophizing." Concluding, Felperin talked about Liu's urge of using computers for expediency, and opined, "but trying to maintain a handmade vibe that fits the material, making this feel altogether like a lost graphic novel you find in a dive bar and love until the pages fall apart."

== Accolades ==
| Award | Date | Category | Recipient | Result | Ref. |
|---|---|---|---|---|---|
| Berlin International Film Festival | 16–26 February 2023 | Golden Bear | Art College 1994 | Nominated | |
| Sydney Film Festival | 18 June 2023 | Best Film | Art College 1994 | Nominated | |
| Annecy International Animation Film Festival | 17 June 2023 | Cristal for a Feature Film | Art College 1994 | Nominated | |
