= Ajoomma (film) =

- Theatrical release poster
- Directed by: He Shuming
- Written by: He Shuming; Kris Ong
- Screenplay by: He Shuming; Kris Ong
- Produced by: Anthony Chen; Huang Wenhong; Joonhan Lee
- Starring: Hong Hui Fang; Kang Hyung-suk; Jung Dong-hwan; Yeo Jin-goo; Shane Pow
- Cinematography: Hwang Gyeong-hyeon
- Edited by: Jasmine Ng Kin Kia; Armiliah Aripin
- Music by: Si Hao Ting
- Production companies: Giraffe Pictures; Rediance; Singapore Film Commission; Korean Film Council; Seoul Film Commission
- Distributed by: Golden Village Pictures
- Release dates: 7 October 2022 (Busan); 27 October 2022 (Singapore)
- Running time: 90 minutes
- Countries: Singapore; South Korea
- Languages: Mandarin; Korean; English
- Box office: $718,000

Ajoomma (Korean: 아줌마; RR: Ajumma; simplified Chinese: 花路阿朱妈; traditional Chinese: 花路阿朱媽) is a 2022 Singaporean-South Korean drama film directed by He Shuming and produced by Anthony Chen. It stars Hong Hui Fang, Kang Hyung-suk and Jung Dong-hwan.

The film garnered four nominations at the 59th Golden Horse Awards and Hong became the first Singaporean to be nominated for the Best Leading Actress award. It premiered at the 2022 Busan International Film Festival on 7 October 2022 and opened in local cinemas on 27 October 2022. The film was selected as the Singaporean entry for the Best International Feature Film at the 95th Academy Awards.

== Cast ==
- Hong Hui Fang as Auntie
- Kang Hyung-suk as Kwon-Woo
- Jung Dong-hwan as Jung Su
- Yeo Jin-goo as Yeo Jin-goo
- Shane Pow as Sam

== Production ==
The film is touted as the first official Singapore-South Korean co-production. The filming was interrupted by the COVID-19 pandemic. It was mostly shot in South Korea, with Hong filming there between end of December 2021 and February 2022. Filming was completed by early April 2022.

== Reception ==
=== Box Office ===
The film grossed $718,000 in Singapore.

=== Accolades ===
Award	Year	Category	Recipients	Result	Ref.
27th Busan International Film Festival (2022)	2022	New Currents Award	Ajoomma	Nominated	
BaliMakarya Film Festival (2022)	2022	Best Film	Ajoomma	Won	
Golden Horse Film Festival and Awards	2022	Best Leading Actress	Hong Huifang	Nominated	
Golden Horse Film Festival and Awards	2022	Best Supporting Actor	Jung Dong-hwan	Nominated	
Golden Horse Film Festival and Awards	2022	Best New Director	He Shuming	Nominated	
Golden Horse Film Festival and Awards	2022	Best Original Screenplay	He Shuming, Kris Ong	Nominated	
Golden Horse Film Festival and Awards	2022	FIPRESCI Prize	Ajoomma	Nominated	
Golden Horse Film Festival and Awards	2022	NETPAC Award	Ajoomma	Nominated	
Golden Horse Film Festival and Awards	2022	Observation Missions for Asian Cinema Award	Ajoomma	Nominated	
QCinema International Film Festival	2022	Best Screenplay	He Shuming, Kris Ong	Won	
Asian World Film Festival	2022	Snow Leopard Best Actress Award	Hong Huifang	Won	
Red Sea International Film Festival	2022	Film AlUla Audience Award (Best Film)	Ajoomma	Won	

== See also ==
- List of submissions to the 95th Academy Awards for Best International Feature Film
- List of Singaporean submissions for the Academy Award for Best International Feature Film
