= American Girl (2021 film) =

2021 Taiwanese film

- Theatrical release poster
- Traditional Chinese: 美國女孩
- Simplified Chinese: 美国女孩
- Hanyu Pinyin: Měiguó Nǚhái
- Directed by: Fiona Roan Feng-i
- Written by: Fiona Roan Feng-i; Li Bing
- Produced by: Clifford Miu; Amy Ma
- Starring: Karena Lam; Kaiser Chuang; Caitlin Fang; Audrey Lin
- Cinematography: Giorgos Valsamis
- Edited by: Mao Zekun
- Music by: Wu Peilin
- Production companies: Media Asia Films; Splash Pictures; JVR Music; GHY Culture and Media
- Distributed by: Clover Films; Golden Village Pictures; Netflix (international)
- Release dates: October 31, 2021 (Tokyo International Film Festival); December 3, 2021 (Taiwan)
- Running time: 101 minutes
- Country: Taiwan
- Languages: Mandarin; English

American Girl is a 2021 Taiwanese drama film directed as the debut feature by Fiona Roan Feng-i. It depicts the semi-autobiographical story of Fen Liang, who returns to Taiwan from the United States with her mother and younger sister after their mother is diagnosed with breast cancer, during the 2002–2004 SARS outbreak. The film is executive produced by acclaimed director Tom Shu-Yu Lin, and is now exclusively available in over 190 countries and territories on Netflix.

== Cast ==
- Karena Lam Wang Li-li (Lily)
- Kaiser Chuang as Liang Chong-hui
- Caitlin Fang as Liang Fang-yi (Fen)
- Audrey Lin as Ann
- Winnie Chang as Ting's mom
- Kimi Hsia as Ms. Su
- Brando Huang as Liu
- Bowie Tsang as Dr. Han

== Critical reception ==
American Girl was officially selected in the 2021 Tokyo International Film Festival’s Asian Future competition section. The film won five Golden Horse Awards, including Best New Performer for Caitlin Fang, Best New Director for Fiona Roan Feng-i, Best Cinematography for Giorgos Valsamis, the Audience Choice Award, and the FIPRESCI Prize during the 58th Golden Horse Awards.

== Accolades ==
Year	Award	Category	Recipient(s)	Result	Ref.
2022	Hong Kong Film Awards	Best Film from Mainland and Taiwan	American Girl	Won	
