= Lau Kok Rui =

Malaysian director and screenwriter (born 1990)

- 劉國瑞
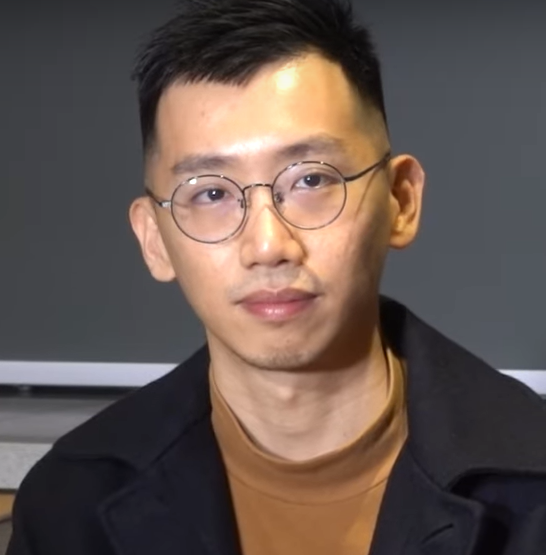
- Lau in December 2022
- Born: Lau Kok Rui; 1990 (age 35–36); Muar, Johor, Malaysia
- Education: City University of Hong Kong (BBA)
- Occupations: Director; screenwriter
- Years active: 2017–present

Lau Kok Rui (Chinese: 劉國瑞; born 1990) is a Hong Kong–based Malaysian film director and screenwriter best known for his feature film debut The Sunny Side of the Street (2022), for which he won Best New Director and Best Original Screenplay in the 59th Golden Horse Awards.

== Biography ==
Lau was born in 1990 in Muar, Johor, Malaysia. He is of Chinese descent with ancestral roots from Fujian, China, and has an elder brother and sister who later pursued studies in Taiwan. Lau, describing his hometown as lacking in entertainment, spent most of his childhood immersed in reading and watching movies, including books beyond his age owned by his siblings and Chinese films owned by his classmates. He later attended and graduated from Chung Hwa High School in 2008. Upon graduation, Lau intended to studying abroad. However, since he didn't want to follow his siblings and found Singapore too similar to his home country, he sought for places that are unpopular for Malaysian graduates. He was then informed by his high school teachers about a full scholarship program offered by City University of Hong Kong, and he applied despite not knowing Cantonese and having only a limited knowledge of Hong Kong through films like Infernal Affairs. He subsequently moved to Hong Kong alone at the age of 18 and resided in Kowloon Tong. He studied marketing at CityU and graduated with a Bachelor of Business Administration in 2011. After graduation, he became a research assistant at Chinese University of Hong Kong for a year. Initially considering postgraduate studies in political science, he eventually found himself lacking interest in the extensive essay writing involved. During that time, he attended a filmmaking workshop at the University of Hong Kong and became interested in film production. He then applied for a documentary directing course organised by Tammy Cheung and was mentored by Cheang Pou-soi and Steve Yuen. In 2013, he entered the film industry and began producing documentaries. He became a permanent resident of Hong Kong in 2015, and began working in advertisement production and as a volunteer at Pathfinder International in 2017.

In 2017, Lau marked his television series debut as a writer for ViuTV drama series Afterlife Firm. He then produced an RTHK documentary The Sea Gypsies, and made his directorial debut in 2019 with the ViuTV romance series Till Death Do Us Part. He started to pen a screenplay which later evolved into The Sunny Side of the Street in the same year, which themes about South Asian ethnic minorities in Hong Kong that was influenced by his own experiences as an outsider residing in Hong Kong. The screenplay was enlisted in the 2019 Hong Kong-Asia Film Financing Forum, and went into production with Lau serving as the director and scriptwriter. Lau was originally admitted for a postgraduate program at Columbia University in 2020, but he rejected the offer to focus on the film project. Lau's debut feature film was theatrically released in 2022 and received numerous awards, with Lau himself winning Best New Director and Best Original Screenplay in the 59th Golden Horse Awards and received nominations for Best New Director and Best Screenplay in the 41st Hong Kong Film Awards. Lau is currently working on a second feature film project which is based in Malaysia.

== Personal life ==
Lau is married to a Hong Kongese woman.

== Filmography ==
=== Film ===
Year	Title	Writer	Director	Notes/Ref.
2022	The Sunny Side of the Street	Yes	Yes	

=== Television ===
Year	Title	Writer	Director	Notes/Ref.
2017	Afterlife Firm	Yes	No	
2019	Till Death Do Us Part	Yes	Yes	
2019	Showman's Show	Yes	No	

== Awards and nominations ==
Year	Award	Category	Work	Result	Ref.
2022	59th Golden Horse Awards	Best New Director	The Sunny Side of the Street	Won	
2022	59th Golden Horse Awards	Best Original Screenplay	The Sunny Side of the Street	Won	
2023	41st Hong Kong Film Awards	Best New Director	The Sunny Side of the Street	Nominated	
2023	41st Hong Kong Film Awards	Best Screenplay	The Sunny Side of the Street	Nominated	
