= Lost (South Korean TV series) =

2021 South Korean television series

- Promotional poster
- Also known as: Disqualified as a Human; No Longer Human
- Hangul: 인간실격
- Lit.: Human Disqualification
- RR: Ingan silgyeok
- MR: In'gan silkyŏk
- Genre: Melodrama
- Created by: JTBC
- Written by: Kim Ji-hye
- Directed by: Hur Jin-ho; Park Hong-soo
- Starring: Jeon Do-yeon; Ryu Jun-yeol; Park Byung-eun; Kim Hyo-jin
- Music by: Cho Seong-woo
- Country of origin: South Korea
- Original language: Korean
- No. of episodes: 16

Production
- Executive producers: Park Jong-cheol; Jeong Seung-soon; Hong Seong-hwa
- Producers: Baek Chang-joo; Park Jun-seo; Jo Jun-hyeong
- Editors: Choi Jae-eun; Seon Soo-ji
- Running time: 70 minutes
- Production companies: C-JeS Entertainment; Drama House

Original release
- Network: JTBC
- Release: September 4 – October 24, 2021

Lost (Korean: 인간실격) is a 2021 South Korean television series starring Jeon Do-yeon, Ryu Jun-yeol, Park Byung-eun and Kim Hyo-jin. Labelled as "JTBC's Tenth Anniversary Special Project", it aired from September 4 to October 24, 2021 every Saturday and Sunday at 22:30 (KST). It is also available for streaming on iQIYI.

== Synopsis ==
It tells the story of ordinary people who have worked hard all their lives to see the spotlight, but have to face the reality that "nothing has happened" while realizing they are now in the middle of the downhill road of life.

== Cast ==
=== Main ===
- Jeon Do-yeon as Bu-jeong, a ghostwriter who wants to write an original work in her own name. She has tried her best in life, but suddenly encounters a failure and loses reason to live.
- Ryu Jun-yeol as Kang-jae, a man facing the end of his youth who is afraid of "being nothing". He grew up poor and dreams to become rich. He runs a service company that organizes people to take on different roles required by clients.
- Park Byung-eun as Jung-soo, Bu-jeong's husband who is a food store management team leader in a department store.
- Kim Hyo-jin as Kyung-eun, Jung-soo's first love.

=== Supporting ===
==== People around Bu-jeong ====
- Park In-hwan as Chang-suk, Bu-jeong's father.
- Shin Shin-ae as Min-ja, Jung-soo's mother.
- Park Ji-young as Ah-ran, an actress and a best-selling author.

==== People around Kang-jae ====
- Yoo Su-bin as Tak / Sun-joo (real name), Kang-jae's best friend.
- Son Na-eun as Min-jung, Kang-jae's friend who is a former idol trainee.
- Jo Eun-ji as Sun-gyu, a pharmacist.
- Yang Dong-geun as Woo-nam, a nurse in the intensive care unit.
- Kang Ji-eun as Mi-sun, Kang-jae's mother.
- Lee Seo-hwan as Jang-gyu, Mi-sun's housemate.
- Ryu Ji-hun as Jong-hun, host team leader.
- Na Hyun-woo as Jung-woo, a host.

==== Others ====
- Oh Kwang-rok as Jin-seop, an actor.
- Lee Se-na as Ji-na, Jin-seop's lover.
- Kang Hyung-suk as Jun-hyuk, Jung-soo's co-worker.

== Production ==
Lost is the first-ever television project of film director Hur Jin-ho. It also marks lead stars Jeon Do-yeon and Ryu Jun-yeol's small screen comeback after five years.

It was reported that the first script reading of the cast was held on January 6, 2021.

== Viewership ==
Lost : South Korea viewers per episode (thousands)

Season	Episode number															
Season	1	2	3	4	5	6	7	8	9	10	11	12	13	14	15	16
1	930	827	728	566	N/A	543	N/A	426	N/A	N/A	N/A	N/A	N/A	N/A	N/A	468

Source: Audience measurement performed nationwide by Nielsen Korea

Average TV viewership ratings
Ep.	Original broadcast date	Average audience share (Nielsen Korea)	
Ep.	Original broadcast date	Nationwide	Seoul
1	September 4, 2021	4.191% (3rd)	4.071% (2nd)
2	September 5, 2021	3.752% (2nd)	4.023% (2nd)
3	September 11, 2021	3.308% (3rd)	3.531% (3rd)
4	September 12, 2021	2.784% (7th)	3.472%(3rd)
5	September 18, 2021	1.696% (N/A)	N/A
6	September 19, 2021	2.269% (9th)	2.729% (4th)
7	September 25, 2021	1.356% (N/A)	N/A
8	September 26, 2021	2.101% (N/A)	2.605% (9th)
9	October 2, 2021	1.168% (N/A)	N/A
10	October 3, 2021	1.904% (N/A)	N/A
11	October 9, 2021	1.052% (N/A)	N/A
12	October 10, 2021	1.848% (N/A)	N/A
13	October 16, 2021	1.656% (N/A)	N/A
14	October 17, 2021	1.642% (N/A)	N/A
15	October 23, 2021	1.210% (N/A)	N/A
16	October 24, 2021	2.435% (10th)	2.631% (5th)
Average		2.148%	— (Note: Due to some unpublished ratings, the exact average rating is unknown.)
In the table above, the blue numbers represent the lowest ratings and the red numbers represent the highest ratings.; N/A denotes that the rating/ranking is not known.; This series aired on a cable channel/pay TV which normally has a relatively smaller audience compared to free-to-air TV/public broadcasters (KBS, SBS, MBC and EBS).
