= Hu Jhih-ciang =

Taiwanese actor

- 胡智強
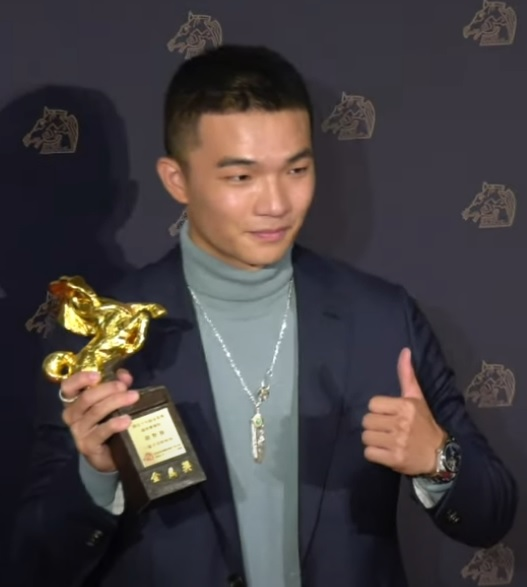
- Hu at the 59th Golden Horse Awards in November 2022
- Born: November 12, 1997 (age 28); Douliu, Yunlin County, Taiwan
- Other name: Hu Zhiqiang
- Education: Taipei National University of the Arts (BFA)
- Occupation: Actor
- Years active: 2020–present

Chinese name
- Traditional Chinese: 胡智強
- Simplified Chinese: 胡智强
- Hanyu Pinyin: Hú Zhìqiáng
- Hokkien POJ: Ô͘ Tì-kiông

Hu Jhih-ciang (Chinese: 胡智強; Pe̍h-ōe-jī: Ô͘ Tì-kiông; born November 12, 1997) is a Taiwanese actor. He received double nominations at the 59th Golden Horse Awards, namely Best Supporting Actor and the Best New Performer award, for his performance in the 2022 drama film Coo-Coo 043; and eventually winning the latter. In the same year, Hu was also named Best Actor at the 44th Golden Harvest Awards for his role in the short film Revolting with Dragon.

== Filmography ==
=== Television series ===
Year	English title	Original title	Role	Notes
2022	About Youth	默默的我，不默默的我們	Restaurant manager	
2023	Taiwan Crime Stories	台灣犯罪故事－黑潮之下		

=== Film ===
Year	English title	Original title	Role	Notes/Ref.
2020	The Rooftop	頂樓的自習課	Hsu Jing-hao	Short film
2020	A Lock with No Key	把風		Short film
2020	Three Steps	三步	Yong-mu	Short film
2021	Revolting with Dragon	龔囝	Yen-yun	Short film
2021	Waiting for My Cup of Tea	一杯熱奶茶的等待	Wu Yu-fan	
2022	Missing	小緯回來過，在他離開之後	Lin Shao-bin	Television
2022	Little Blue	小藍	Liu Wen-zhi	
2022	Coo-Coo 043	一家子兒咕咕叫	Hsiao-hu	
2022	On Another's Sorrow	送行		Short film
2023	Miss Shampoo	請問，還有哪裡需要加強	Young Tai	

=== Music video appearances ===
Year	Artist	Song title
2020	G5SH	"Back to Heaven"
2022	Insecteens	"In a Flash"

== Awards and nominations ==
Year	Award	Category	Nominated work	Result
2022	44th Golden Harvest Awards	Best Actor	Revolting with Dragon	Won
2022	59th Golden Horse Awards	Best Supporting Actor	Coo-Coo 043	Nominated
2022	59th Golden Horse Awards	Best New Performer	Coo-Coo 043	Won
2023	58th Golden Bell Awards	Best Supporting Actor in a Miniseries or Television Film	Revolting with Dragon	Nominated
