= Kang Hyung-suk =

South Korean actor (born 1992)

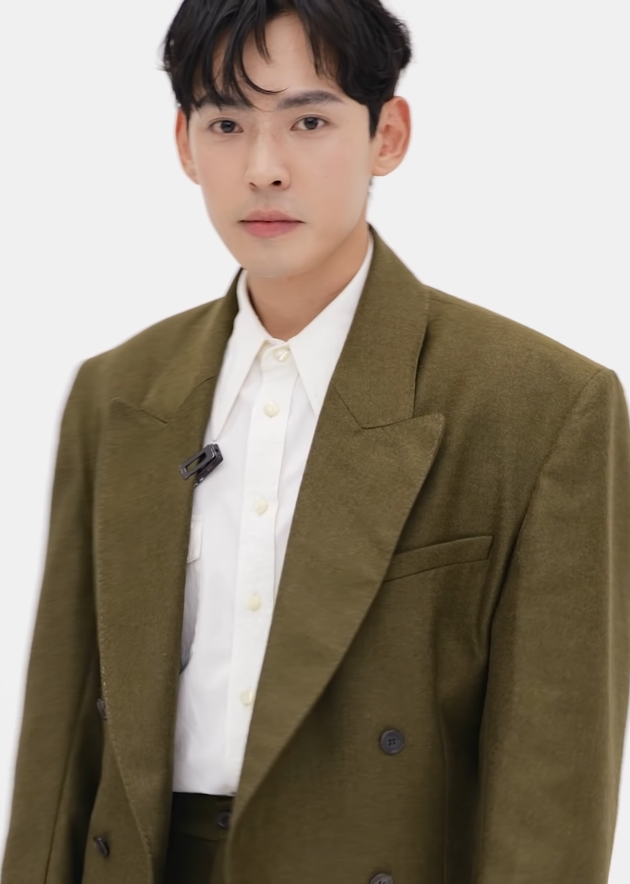
- Kang in December 2021
- Born: January 1, 1992 (age 34); South Korea
- Occupation: Actor
- Years active: 2004–present
- Agent: Gram Entertainment
- Known for: Hometown Cha-Cha-Cha

Korean name
- Hangul: 강형석
- RR: Gang Hyeongseok
- MR: Kang Hyŏngsŏk

Kang Hyung-suk (Korean: 강형석; born January 1, 1992) is a South Korean stage, movie and television actor. He is best known for his role in drama Do Do Sol Sol La La Sol (2020), Hometown Cha-Cha-Cha (2021), Lost (2021) and movie Ajoomma (2022).

== Career ==
=== 2016–2021: Beginnings ===
After graduating from the Department of Theater and Film, Kang began his professional career on stage. He debuted in 2016 in the play Crazy Romance, followed by the 2018 production Re-meet and the musical Evil Dead. His transition to television occurred in 2019 after a meeting with a casting manager for the tvN drama Crash Landing on You. This meeting led to his television debut as a North Korean soldier in the series.

Throughout 2020, Kang appeared in several minor roles across various networks, including KBS Drama Special, JTBC's Itaewon Class and SBS's Dr. Romantic 2. He secured his first significant supporting role as Ahn Jung-ho in the Netflix and KBS2 simulcast drama Do Do Sol Sol La La Sol. His performance in this series led to an exclusive contract with AM Entertainment.

Kang made his film debut in 2020 with a supporting role as Kim Eui-song in the independent film Value Capsida. Directed by Cho Seung-won, the feature film was based on the director's personal experiences as a KATUSA soldier and received a theatrical release in October 2021.

In 2021, Kang successfully auditioned for the role of Choi Eun-cheol, a police officer at the Gongjin Police Station, in the tvN drama Hometown Cha-Cha-Cha. During the same year, he appeared in the JTBC drama Lost in the role of Jun-hyeok.

=== 2022–present: Leading roles and international recognition ===
In 2022, Kang starred alongside Singaporean actress Hong Huifang in the Korean-Singapore joint film Ajoomma. The film premiered in the "New Currents" competition section of the 27th Busan International Film Festival (BIFF). The film follows the story of a Singaporean housewife who is obsessed with Korean dramas and travels to Korea alone. Kang portrayed Kwon-woo, a Chinese-speaking tour guide struggling with debt and family separation.

In 2023, Kang was appointed as the Public Relations Ambassador for the 3rd ASEAN Film Week. The event was co-hosted by the ASEAN Cultural Center, operated by the Korea Foundation, and the Korea Film Center.

== Filmography ==
=== Film ===
Year	Title		Role	Ref.
Year	English	Korean	Role	Ref.
2021	We Go Together (Value Capsida)	가치 캅시다	Kim Ui-seong	
2022	Ajoomma	아줌마	Kwon-woo	
2024	Officer Black Belt	무도실무관	Writer Kang	

=== Television ===
Key
†	Denotes television productions that have not yet been released

Year	Title		Role	Ref.
Year	English	Korean	Role	Ref.
2019–2020	Crash Landing on You	사랑의 불시착	North Korean soldier	
2020	Itaewon Class	이태원 클라쓰	Minor role	
2020	Dr. Romantic 2	낭만닥터 김사부	Minor role	
2020	Do Do Sol Sol La La Sol	도도솔솔라라솔	Ahn Jung-ho	
2021	Hometown Cha-Cha-Cha	갯마을 차차차	Choi Eun-cheol	
2021	Lost	인간실격	Jun-hyeok	
2022	Love in Contract	월수금화목토	Woo Kwang-nam	
2025	Second Shot at Love	금주를 부탁해	Bong Seon-wook	
2026	Dive into You	너에게 다이브	Yang Jun-mo	

== Stage ==
=== Musical ===
Year	Title		Role	Venue	Date	Ref.
Year	English	Korean	Role	Venue	Date	Ref.
2018	Evil Dead	이블데드	Rudolph/Multi-roles	Uniflex Hall 1 (Large Theater)	June 12 to August 26	
2018	2018 Starlight Musical Festival – Incheon	2018 스타라이트 뮤지컬 페스티벌 – 인천	Himself	Paradise City, Incheon	October 20 to 21	

=== Theater ===
Year	Title		Role	Venue	Date	Ref.
Year	English	Korean	Role	Venue	Date	Ref.
2016	Crazy Romance	발칙한 로맨스	Gu Bong-pil	Busan BNK Art Hall	June 23 to September 25	
2018	Re-meet	리미트	Gu Bong-pil	JTN Art Hall	August 8 (open run)	
2019	Crazy Romance	발칙한 로맨스	Gu Bong-pil	CK Art Hall Ulsan	January 4 to 31	

== Ambassadorship ==
- Public relations ambassador for the 3rd ASEAN Film Week (2023)
