= Incantation (film) =

2022 film by Kevin Ko

- Official release poster
- Original title: 咒
- Directed by: Kevin Ko
- Screenplay by: Chang Che-wei; Kevin Ko
- Produced by: Push Yang; Kevin Ko; Chen Chun-lin
- Starring: Tsai Hsuan-yen; Huang Sin-ting; Kao Ying-hsuan; Sean Lin; RQ
- Cinematography: Chen Ko-chin
- Edited by: Kevin Ko
- Music by: Rockid Lee
- Distributed by: Netflix
- Release date: March 18, 2022
- Running time: 111 minutes
- Country: Taiwan
- Languages: Mandarin; Taiwanese Hokkien; Tai Lue
- Budget: $1 million
- Box office: $5.7 million

Incantation (Chinese: 咒; pinyin: Zhòu) is a 2022 Taiwanese found footage supernatural folk horror film directed by Kevin Ko, who also co-wrote the screenplay with Chang Che-wei. The film was released in Taiwan on 18 March 2022, and it became the highest-grossing Taiwanese horror film. It received an international distribution from Netflix on 8 July 2022.

== Plot ==
A woman named Li Ronan implores the viewer to memorize an insignia and chant an incantation to send blessings and lift the curse afflicting her six-year-old daughter, Dodo. The insignia and incantation are interspersed frequently throughout the film to encourage the viewer to play along. The events are presented as found footage in a non-linear manner. The written plot is presented in chronological order.

Six years earlier, a newly pregnant Ronan, her boyfriend Dom, and Dom's cousin Yuan break a serious religious taboo while documenting a ritual for their online video channel. They visit Dom and Yuan's relatives in a remote clan mountain village, where the villagers practice an esoteric Yunnan religion centered around an ancestral deity called Mother-Buddha. They spy on the clan preparing a young girl for sacrifice for a ritual. The unconscious child, whose body is covered in runes, is left in front of a tunnel that the clan has expressly forbidden the trio from entering. After hearing children's voices inside, Dom and Yuan enter the tunnel; Yuan soon emerges screaming, while Dom's dead body is carried out by the villagers. The footage shot within the tunnel by Dom and Yuan has since become damaged, and the camera used to film the footage is cursed, killing whoever views the footage within. After Dodo is born, Ronan leaves her at a foster care home and seeks psychiatric help after losing her parents to a car accident, both of whom viewed the footage filmed inside the tunnel.

In the present, Ronan has recovered and is preparing to bring Dodo to live with her, feeling ready for this new chapter in her life. However, Dodo becomes troubled by a malevolent presence and develops a debilitating illness. When social workers arrive to take Dodo away, believing Ronan to be an unfit guardian, the mother and daughter escape with the help of Ming, the sympathetic manager of the foster home. They bring Dodo to a shrine, where a priest and his wife instruct her not to eat for the next seven days. However, when runes begin appearing all over Dodo's body, Ronan desperately feeds her. The priest and his wife are then violently killed, and Dodo's condition worsens.

Ming steals the cursed camera and travels to Yunnan to consult an elder monk who specializes in translating esoteric Buddhist scriptures and has the damaged tunnel footage professionally restored. After watching the restored footage, he becomes possessed and kills himself. The footage reveals that Dom and Yuan encountered disturbing ritualistic objects throughout the tunnel, which eventually led them to the altar of Mother-Buddha. When Dom removes the veil covering Mother-Buddha's face, he becomes possessed and kills himself. Yuan manages to escape but is driven insane by witnessing Dom's suicide, and the powers of Mother-Buddha. The villagers burn Dom's body, and their own bodies are likewise covered in runes.

Ronan confesses that she has been deceiving the viewers all along. The priest whom Ming visited in Yunnan revealed that Mother-Buddha is, in fact, a malevolent entity brought from Southeast Asia to Yunnan. Submitting one's name along with the incantation signifies agreement to bear her curse. Rather than conveying blessings, the incantation actually serves to dilute the curse; as more people chant it, the curse spreads, reducing the burden on any single individual and resulting in fewer misfortunes befalling them. Mother-Buddha's face must remain covered because it is the source of the curse.

Ronan returns Dodo to the foster home and travels back to the tunnel in the now-abandoned village. At the altar, she reveals Mother-Buddha's face on camera, intending to curse the viewers to save her daughter. She then becomes possessed and kills herself. The film concludes with a happy and healthy Dodo, implying that the burden of her curse has been shared with everyone who watched the film, thereby lessening its effects.

== Cast ==
- Tsai Hsuan-yen (蔡亘晏) as Li Ronan
- Huang Sin-ting (黃歆庭) as Dodo
- Kao Ying-hsuan (高英軒) as Ming
- Sean Lin (林敬倫) as Dom
- RQ (Wen Ching-yu) (溫慶禹) as Yuan

== Production ==
=== Background ===
The film is inspired by an incident in Gushan District, Kaohsiung in 2005. A family of six had claimed that they were possessed by various Chinese folk religion deities and accused each other of being possessed by demons masquerading as deities. They burned each other with incense, hit each other with sticks and spirit tablets, and splashed feces and urine on each other in an attempt to expel the demons. In the end, they singled out the eldest daughter and attacked her until she died of her injuries. The five remaining members of her family were subsequently charged with the offense of "abandoning a helpless person resulting in the person's death". The case was considered one of mass hysteria.

=== Design ===
Kevin Ko explained that the Mother Buddha, hand gestures, chant, symbols, and everything associated with the religion in the film are all fictitious. Much of the budget was spent on the design and production of the props, especially the large statue of the Mother Buddha.

The image of the Mother Buddha incorporated elements from Tibetan Buddhism and Hinduism.

== Release ==
Incantation was showcased at the Network of Asian Fantastic Films (NAFF) project market during the 2019 Bucheon International Fantastic Film Festival before entering production and going on to become the highest-grossing Taiwanese horror film. The film was released in Taiwan on March 18, 2022, and also screened at the Far East Film Festival. In June 2022, Netflix announced that it would distribute the film worldwide on July 8, 2022.

== Reception ==
=== Box office ===
As of June 2022, Incantation has grossed NT$170,000,000 (US$5,700,000), making it the highest-grossing 2022 film in Taiwan. It became the highest-grossing Taiwanese horror film of all time.

=== Critical response ===
On the review aggregator website Rotten Tomatoes, the film has an approval rating of 75% based on 12 reviews, with an average rating of 6.8/10.

== Awards and nominations ==
Awards	Category	Recipient	Result	Ref.
24th Taipei Film Awards	Best Narrative Feature	Incantation	Nominated	
24th Taipei Film Awards	Best Director	Kevin Ko	Nominated	
24th Taipei Film Awards	Best Actress	Tsai Hsuan-yen	Nominated	
24th Taipei Film Awards	Best Supporting Actor	Kao Ying-hsuan	Won	
24th Taipei Film Awards	Best Cinematography	Chen Ko-chin	Nominated	
24th Taipei Film Awards	Best Art Design	Otto Chen	Won	
24th Taipei Film Awards	Best Visual Effects	MoonShine Animation	Nominated	
59th Golden Horse Awards	Best Narrative Feature	Incantation	Nominated	
59th Golden Horse Awards	Best Director	Kevin Ko	Nominated	
59th Golden Horse Awards	Best Leading Actress	Tsai Hsuan-yen	Nominated	
59th Golden Horse Awards	Best Supporting Actor	Kao Ying-hsuan	Nominated	
59th Golden Horse Awards	Best New Performer	Huang Sin-ting	Nominated	
59th Golden Horse Awards	Best Original Screenplay	Chang Che-wei and Kevin Ko	Nominated	
59th Golden Horse Awards	Best Cinematography	Chen Ko-chin	Nominated	
59th Golden Horse Awards	Best Visual Effects	Huang Min-pin, Hsieh Meng-cheng, Lu Kuan-sang and Li Che-cheng	Nominated	
59th Golden Horse Awards	Best Art Direction	Otto Chen	Nominated	
59th Golden Horse Awards	Best Makeup & Costume Design	Dong Yan-xiu and Chu Chia-yi	Nominated	
59th Golden Horse Awards	Best Original Film Score	Rockid Lee	Nominated	
59th Golden Horse Awards	Best Film Editing	Kevin Ko	Won	
59th Golden Horse Awards	Best Sound Effects	R.T Kao, Rockid Lee and Richard Hocks	Won	
59th Golden Horse Awards	Audience Choice Award	Incantation	Nominated	
