= Hang in There, Kids! =

2016 film

- Film poster
- Directed by: Laha Mebow
- Written by: Laha Mebow
- Produced by: Chu Ai-lun
- Starring: Albee Huang
- Cinematography: Ming Wang
- Edited by: Chen Chien-chih
- Music by: Baobu Badulu
- Production companies: Sun Moon Stars Entertainment; Sky Films Entertainment
- Release date: 18 March 2016
- Running time: 90 minutes
- Country: Taiwan
- Languages: Mandarin; Atayal

Hang in There, Kids! (Atayal: Lokah Laqi; Chinese: 只要我長大) is a 2016 Taiwanese drama film directed by Laha Mebow. It was selected as the Taiwanese entry for the Best Foreign Language Film at the 89th Academy Awards but it was not nominated.

== Cast ==
- Albee Huang
- Sharon Kao
- Buya Watan
- Watan Silan
- Suyan Pito

== Awards and nominations ==
Award ceremony	Category	Recipients	Result
17th Chinese Film Media Awards	Best New Performer	Chen Yu	Nominated

== See also ==
- List of submissions to the 89th Academy Awards for Best Foreign Language Film
- List of Taiwanese submissions for the Academy Award for Best Foreign Language Film
