= Gaga (film) =

- Promotional poster
- Traditional Chinese: 哈勇家
- Simplified Chinese: 哈勇家
- Literal meaning: "Ha-yong's home" / "Ha-yong's family" / "Ha-yong and family"
- Hanyu Pinyin: Hā yǒng jiā
- Directed by: Laha Mebow
- Written by: Laha Mebow; Hsieh Hui-ching
- Produced by: Chu Yu-ning; Liang Hung-chih
- Starring: Wilang Noming; Kagaw Piling; Lin Ting-li; Esther Huang; Wilang Lalin; Yukan Losing
- Cinematography: Aymerick Pilarski
- Edited by: Chen Chien-chih
- Music by: Baobu Badulu
- Production company: Skyfilms Entertainment
- Distributed by: Swallow Wings Films
- Release dates: November 5, 2022 (Taipei Golden Horse); November 11, 2022
- Running time: 112 minutes
- Country: Taiwan
- Languages: Mandarin; Atayal; Taiwanese

Gaga (Atayal for "tribal laws", stylized in all uppercase; Chinese: 哈勇家) is a 2022 Taiwanese comedy-drama film co-written and directed by Laha Mebow. The film revolves around a granddaughter whose return from abroad brings about a chain of events that will change the family; with one family member entering the local village chief election, and the matriarch dreaming of the family's possible new life. The film was released in theaters on November 11, 2022.

== Cast ==
- Wilang Noming as Grandpa Ha-yong
- Kagaw Piling as Grandma Ya-meng
- Lin Ting-li
- Esther Huang
- Wilang Lalin
- Yukan Losing as Yi-nuo
- Buya Watan
- Gaki Baunay
- Andy Huang
- Brando Huang

== Awards and nominations ==
Awards	Category	Recipient	Result	Ref.
59th Golden Horse Awards	Best Narrative Feature	Gaga	Nominated	
59th Golden Horse Awards	Best Director	Laha Mebow	Won	
59th Golden Horse Awards	Best Supporting Actress	Kagaw Piling	Won	
59th Golden Horse Awards	Best New Performer	Yukan Losing	Nominated	
59th Golden Horse Awards	Best Original Screenplay	Laha Mebow and Hsieh Hui-ching	Nominated	
59th Golden Horse Awards	Best Original Film Song	"Around The Hearth"; Composer: Baobu Badulu; Lyrics: Laha Mebow and Baobu Badulu; Performer: Ali Batu	Nominated	
59th Golden Horse Awards	Audience Choice Award	Gaga	Nominated	
