= Angela Yuen =

Hong Kong model and actress

- 袁澧林
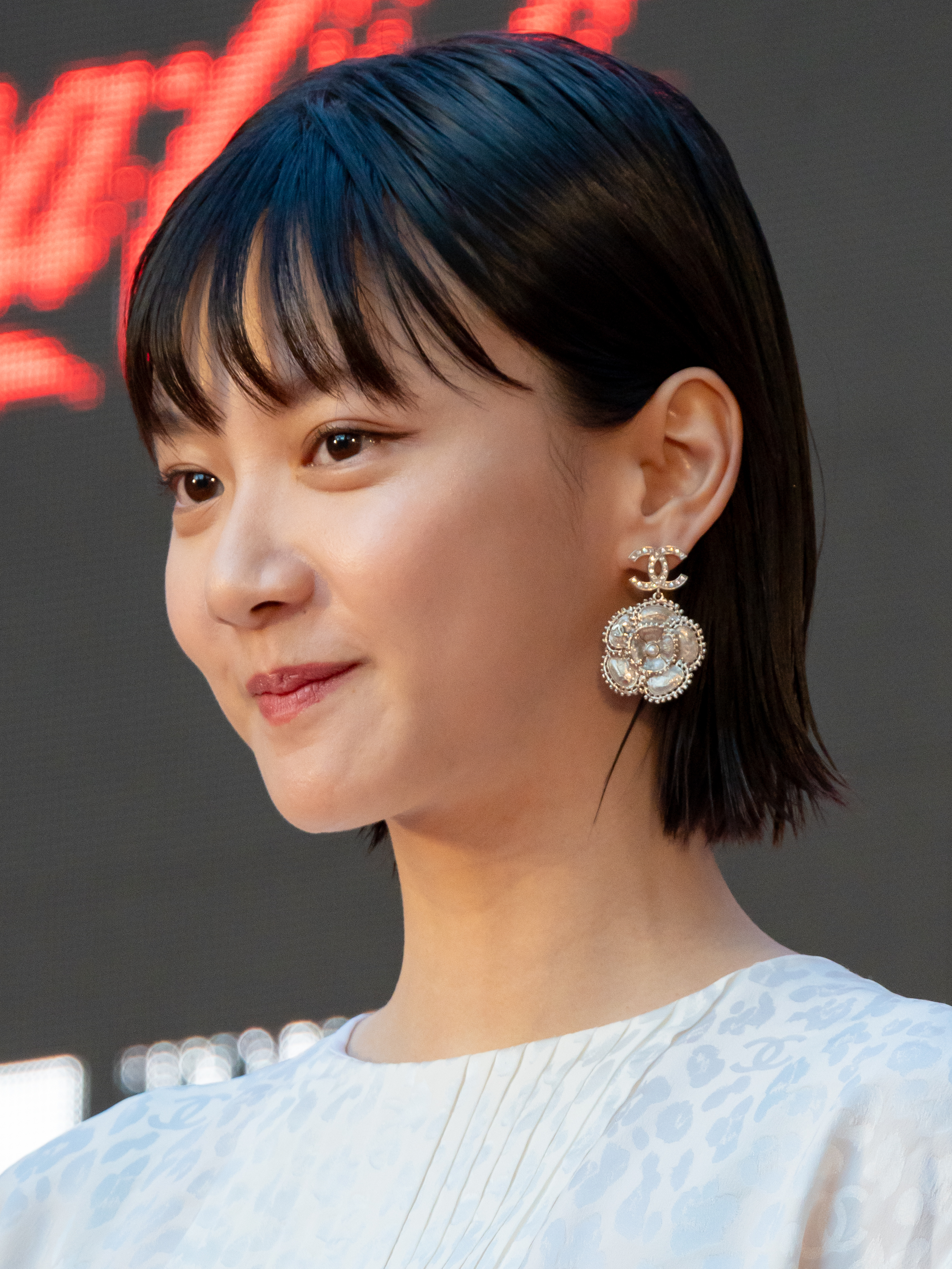
- Yuen at the 36th Tokyo International Film Festival in 2023
- Born: 25 October 1993 (age 32); British Hong Kong
- Education: Degree - BBA (ACCT)
- Alma mater: Hong Kong Baptist University
- Occupations: Actress; model
- Years active: 2013–present

Angela Yuen Lai-lam (Chinese: 袁澧林; born 25 October 1993) is a Hong Kong fashion model and actress. She was nominated for Best Leading Actress at the 59th Golden Horse Awards in 2022 and Best Actress at the 41st Hong Kong Film Awards in 2023 for The Narrow Road.

== Filmography ==
=== Film ===
Year	Film	Role	Notes/Ref.
2015	Are You Here		
2016	Our Seventeen		Main Role
2017	Love Off the Cuff		Cameo
2017	The White Girl	The White Girl	Main Role
2019	Little Q		
2019	Lion Rock	Cathy	
2022	Chilli Laugh Story	Sam	
2022	Hong Kong Family	Joy	
2022	The Narrow Road	Candy	Main Role
2023	Fly Me to the Moon	Lam Tsz Kuet	
2025	Measure in Love	An Ching	Main Role
2026	Gamer Girls	Summer	Main Role

=== Drama ===
Year	Title	Role	Network	Notes/Ref.
2016	We I U	Angela	ViuTV	Main Role
2016	3 X 1	Jolie	ViuTV	
2017	Margaret & David - Ex	Margaret	ViuTV	Main Role
2019	Listening Snow Tower	Ming He	Tencent Video	Supporting Role
2019	Haters Gonna Stay	University student	ViuTV	Cameo (EP7)
2022	I SWIM	Sze Wing	ViuTV	Supporting Role
2023	Killing Procedures		ViuTV	Main Role
2026	Fired Up!	Chao Yi-hsuan	HBO Max	Main Role; Taiwanese drama debut

=== Educational TV show ===
Year	Title	Network
2015	Newton's law of universal gravitation	ETV

=== Music video appearances ===
Year	Title	Notes/Ref.
2022	Ian Chan - "留一天與你喘息"	
2023	Vaundy - "Tokimeki"	

== Awards and nominations ==
Award	Year	Nominee / Work	Category	Result	Ref.
Golden Horse Awards	2022	The Narrow Road	Best Leading Actress	Nominated	
Hong Kong Film Critics Society Awards	2023	The Narrow Road	Best Actress	Nominated	
Hong Kong Film Awards	2023	The Narrow Road	Best Actress	Nominated	
New York Asian Film Festival	2026	Fastest-rising actors	Screen International Rising Star Asia Award	Won	
