= The Post-Truth World =

- Theatrical release poster
- Traditional Chinese: 罪後真相
- Simplified Chinese: 罪后真相
- Literal meaning: "Truth after crime"
- Hanyu Pinyin: Zuì hòu zhēn xiàng
- Directed by: Chen I-fu
- Produced by: Dennis Wu
- Starring: Joseph Chang; Edward Chen; Caitlin Fang; Aviis Zhong; Amber An
- Production companies: Bole Film; Type.Writers Co.
- Distributed by: Bole Film; Vie Vision Pictures
- Release date: October 28, 2022
- Running time: 120 minutes
- Country: Taiwan
- Language: Mandarin

The Post-Truth World (Chinese: 罪後真相) is a 2022 Taiwanese crime mystery film directed by Chen I-fu, starring Joseph Chang, Edward Chen, Caitlin Fang, Aviis Zhong, and Amber An.

== Premise ==
Chang, a former rising sports star who has been jailed for murdering his girlfriend seven years prior, escapes from the prison and brazenly takes hostage of Liu, once a top media personality. As public attention on the case continues to heighten, Liu decides to investigate Chang as a way to get back in the spotlight.

== Cast ==
- Joseph Chang as Liu Li-min
- Edward Chen as Chang Cheng-yi
- Caitlin Fang as Liu Chen-chen
- Aviis Zhong as Hsu Ya-ching
- Amber An as Chang Cheng-yi's sister
- Shih Chih-tian as Fu Lin
- Chan Tzu-hsuan as Wang Shih-yun

== Awards and nominations ==
Awards	Category	Recipient	Result	Ref.
59th Golden Horse Awards	Best Leading Actor	Joseph Chang	Nominated	
59th Golden Horse Awards	Best Supporting Actress	Caitlin Fang	Nominated	
59th Golden Horse Awards	FIPRESCI Prize	The Post-Truth World	Nominated	
