= Yang Ching-huang =

Taiwanese singer and actor

- Born: 10 August 1960 (age 65); Changhua County, Taiwan
- Occupation(s): Actor, singer, show host
- Years active: 1984–present
- Spouse: 3
- Children: 2

Chinese name
- Traditional Chinese: 楊慶煌
- Simplified Chinese: 杨庆煌
- Hanyu Pinyin: Yáng Qìnghuáng
- Hokkien POJ: Iûⁿ Khèng-hông
- Musical career
- Genres: Mandopop

Yang Ching-huang (Chinese: 楊慶煌; Pe̍h-ōe-jī: Iûⁿ Khèng-hông; born 10 August 1960) is a Taiwanese singer and actor. He released 5 Mandopop albums in the 1980s and 1990s.

Ching-huang has been married three times and has two children.

== Selected filmography ==
=== Film ===
Year	English title	Original title	Role	Notes
1984	The First Stitch	在室男		
1984	Finding the Way	細雨春風		
1985	One Bright Day	好個翹課天		
1985	The Matrimony	結婚		
1986	Breadline Blues	母牛一條		
1986	Gallery of Fools	哥們的糗事		
1986	Drifters	流浪少年路		
1986	Secondhand Goods	二手貨		
1988	Yes, Sir!	報告班長		
1988	Autumn Tempest	落山風		
1988	Struggle	奮鬥		
1989	Yes, Sir! 2	報告班長2		
1989	Spirit Love	飛越陰陽界		
1989	Hell Can't Wait	人鬼一家親		
1990	Fraternity	兄弟珍重		
1990	Young Soldier	少爺當大兵		
1997	L'Air du Temps	豪門聖女		
2022	Coo-Coo 043	一家子兒咕咕叫		

== Television series ==
Year	English title	Chinese title	Role	Notes
1992	Continued Fate of Love	再世情緣		
1993	The Legend of Empress Dowager Cixi	戲說慈禧	Zaitian	
1993	Justice Pao	包青天		unrelated characters
1994	The Seven Heroes and Five Gallants	七俠五義	He Mutian	
2006	Unique Flavor	天下第一味		
2008	Love Above All	真情滿天下		
2009	My Family My Love	天下父母心		
2010	Lee Family Reunion	家和萬事興		
2012	The Heart of Woman	天下女人心		
2015	Taste of Life	甘味人生		

== Awards and nominations ==
Year	#	Award	Category	Work	Result
1990	27th	Golden Horse Awards	Best Supporting Actor	Fraternity	Nominated
