= The Resurrected (TV series) =

Taiwanese Netflix television series

- Teaser poster

Chinese name
- Traditional Chinese: 回魂計
Transcriptions
- Genre: Revenge drama; Crime thriller
- Written by: Shen Yang; Yi Shuai-jie; Luo Hsiao-rui
- Directed by: Chao-jen Hsu; Leste Chen
- Starring: Shu Qi; Lee Sinje
- Country of origin: Taiwan
- Original languages: Mandarin (Guoyu), Thai, English
- No. of episodes: 9

Production
- Producers: Bernard T. K. Yang; Emma Duan
- Running time: 46–69
- Production company: Guliguo Pictures Ltd.

Original release
- Network: Netflix
- Release: 9 October 2025

The Resurrected (Chinese: 回魂計) is a 2025 Taiwanese Netflix original series directed by Chao-jen Hsu and Leste Chen. The series starring Shu Qi and Lee Sinje, set in the fictional city of Benkha is about two grieving mothers, who revive a scam ringleader to avenge their daughters, one who is deceased, and the other who is in a coma. The first two episodes of the series premiered at the 30th Busan International Film Festival in the 'On Screen' section on September 18, 2025. It was made available to stream on Netflix on October 9, 2025 globally.

== Cast ==
=== Main ===
- Shu Qi as Wang Huijun, a mother whose daughter is kidnapped and forced to work in a scam center
- Lee Sinje as Zhao Jing, a mother whose daughter is kidnapped and forced to work in a scam center
- Fu Meng-po as Zhang Shikai, the head of the scam center who in a court of law is sentenced to the death penalty for his crimes. He is later revived by Zhao Jing and Wang Huijun in order to exact their revenge.
- Chung Hsin-ling as the mother of Zhang Shikai, and who is a high ranking member of a religious cult
- Caitlin Fang as Hsu Xin-Yi, daughter of Zhao Jing. Kidnapped and forced to work in a scam center.
- Suri Lin as Huang Yizhen's daughter. Kidnapped and forced to work in a scam center.
- Liu Chu-Ping as the sister of Zhang Shikai. She is a wealthy socialite.
- Vivi Chen as the comatose daughter of Wang Huijun. She was also working in the scam center.
- Rexen Cheng as Wang Huijun's ex husband
- Patrick Nattawat Finkler as Eason

=== Special Appearance ===
- Alyssa Chia as Huang Yizhen, a lawyer
- Sukollawat Kanaros as Pong

== Production ==
In February 2025, the Netflix announced five new series in Chinese-language in 2025 slate including, The Resurrected.

== Release and reception ==
The Resurrected is selected for the 'On Screen section' at the 30th Busan International Film Festival, where 2 episodes of the series were screened on September 18, 2025. Following its festival release, the series is available to stream worldwide on Netflix from October 9.

The series became the most-watched show on Netflix Taiwan and entered the top 10 daily rankings in Hong Kong, Thailand, Malaysia, Singapore, and Vietnam. Since its global release on October 9, it has stayed in the top 10 in all six countries. In the weekly rankings for non-English shows (October 6 to 12), it is also doing good, landing in the top 10 in each country, including No. 2 in Taiwan and other high spots elsewhere.
