= The Sunny Side of the Street (film) =

2022 Hong Kong film by Lau Kok Rui

- Promotional poster
- Traditional Chinese: 白日青春
- Simplified Chinese: 白日青春
- Literal meaning: Daytime Youth
- Hanyu Pinyin: Bái rì qīng chūn
- Directed by: Lau Kok Rui
- Written by: Lau Kok-rui
- Produced by: Vinod Sekhar; Winnie Tsang; Soi Cheang; Peter Yam
- Starring: Anthony Wong; Sahal Zaman; Inderjeet Singh; Kiranjeet Gill; Sohail Saghir
- Cinematography: Leung Ming Kai
- Edited by: Matthieu Laclau; Tsai Yann-shan
- Music by: Julian Chan; Kwan Fai Lam
- Production companies: Petra Films; Thousand Sails Pictures; 70 Plus Production Company
- Release date: 15 November 2022 (Taipei Golden Horse)
- Running time: 111 minutes
- Country: Hong Kong
- Languages: Cantonese; Urdu

The Sunny Side of the Street (Chinese: 白日青春) is a 2022 Hong Kong drama film written and directed by Lau Kok Rui. The feature debut of Malaysia-born Lau Kok-rui, the film tells the story of a Hong Kong-born Pakistani refugee boy who forms an unexpected bond with a local taxi driver.

== Cast ==
- Anthony Wong
- Sahal Zaman
- Endy Chow
- Inderjeet Singh
- Kiranjeet Gill
- Sohail Saghir
- Lawrence Lau Shek Yin
- Tai Bo
- Joe Cheung
- Felix Lok
- Patra Au
- Fire Lee
- Yuvraj Singh

== Production ==
The Sunny Side of the Street was produced mainly by Petra Films, a production company under Petra Group, a global conglomerate run by Malaysian businessman Vinod Sekhar. Produced for an estimated cost of around US$1 million, the film was the studio's debut project.

== Release ==
The film's New York Premiere was at the 22nd New York Asian Film Festival in the 'Beyond Borders' section on 17 July 2023.

== Awards and nominations ==
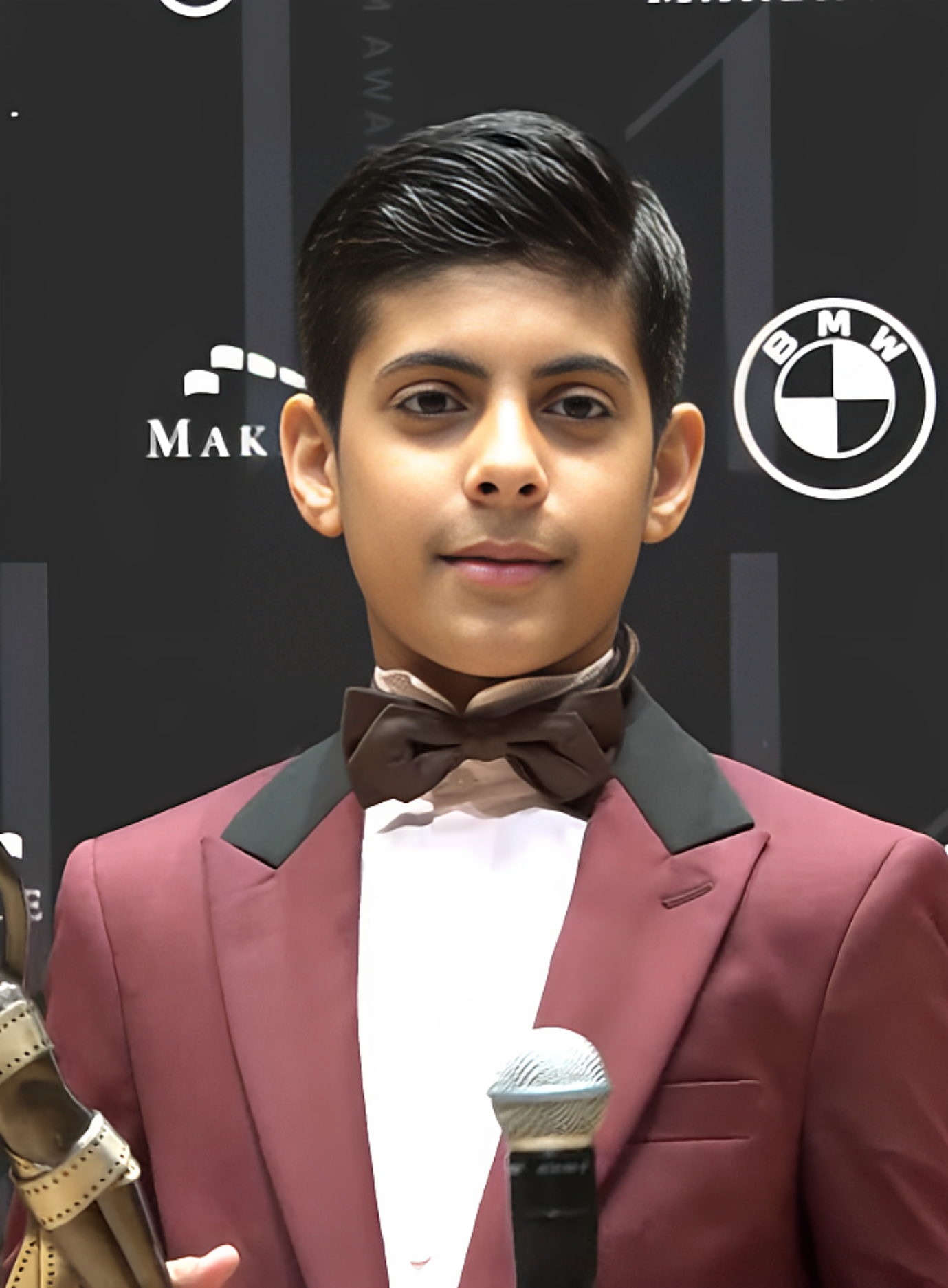
Sahal Zaman won the Hong Kong Film Award for Best New Performer for his role in The Sunny Side of the Street

Awards	Category	Recipient	Result	Ref.
59th Golden Horse Awards	Best Narrative Feature	The Sunny Side of the Street	Nominated	
59th Golden Horse Awards	Best Leading Actor	Anthony Wong	Won	
59th Golden Horse Awards	Best New Director	Lau Kok Rui	Won	
59th Golden Horse Awards	Best New Performer	Sahal Zaman	Nominated	
59th Golden Horse Awards	Best Original Screenplay	Lau Kok-rui	Won	
59th Golden Horse Awards	Best Cinematography	Leung Ming Kai	Nominated	
59th Golden Horse Awards	Audience Choice Award	The Sunny Side of the Street	Nominated	
59th Golden Horse Awards	FIPRESCI Prize	The Sunny Side of the Street	Nominated	
59th Golden Horse Awards	NETPAC Award	The Sunny Side of the Street	Nominated	
59th Golden Horse Awards	Observation Missions for Asian Cinema Award	The Sunny Side of the Street	Nominated	
41st Hong Kong Film Awards	Best Actor	Anthony Wong	Nominated	
41st Hong Kong Film Awards	Best New Performer	Sahal Zaman	Won	
41st Hong Kong Film Awards	Best Screenplay	Lau Kok Rui	Nominated	
41st Hong Kong Film Awards	Best New Director	Lau Kok Rui	Nominated	
