= The Narrow Road (2022 film) =

2022 Hong Kong film by Lam Sum

- Promotional poster
- Traditional Chinese: 窄路微塵
- Simplified Chinese: 窄路微塵
- Literal meaning: "Tiny dust on narrow road"
- Hanyu Pinyin: Zhǎi lù wéi chén
- Jyutping: Zaak3 lou6 mei4 can4
- Directed by: Lam Sum
- Written by: Fean Chung
- Produced by: Mani Man
- Starring: Louis Cheung; Angela Yuen
- Cinematography: Meteor Cheung
- Edited by: Emily Leung
- Music by: Wong Hin-yan
- Production company: MM2 Studios
- Release dates: 19 August 2022 (Edinburgh); 22 December 2022 (Hong Kong)
- Running time: 115 minutes
- Country: Hong Kong
- Language: Cantonese

The Narrow Road (Chinese: 窄路微塵) is a 2022 Hong Kong drama film and the second full-length feature directed by Lam Sum. Set during the early days of the COVID-19 pandemic, it tells the story of Chak (Louis Cheung) who struggles to keep his cleaning company afloat. In the midst of the challenge, he develops a bond with a newly hired cleaner Candy (Angela Yuen) who is his neighbour and also a single mother. The film had its world premiere at the Edinburgh International Film Festival on 19 August 2022.

== Plot ==
In the early days of the pandemic, Chak, struggling to keep his cleaning company afloat, hires single mother Candy. But as the chemistry between them develops, Candy finds it hard to abandon the survival tactics of deception she's always needed to get by.

== Cast ==
- Louis Cheung as Chak (Chan Hon-fat)
- Angela Yuen as Candy
- Patra Au as Wong Ying, Chak's mother
- Chu Pak Hong as a car mechanic/friend of Chak's
- Chu Pak Him as a car mechanic/friend of Chak's
- Tung On-na as Chu, Candy's daughter

== Reception ==
Writing for Deadline Hollywood, Anna Smith called the film "a thought-provoking insight into Hong Kong lockdown life, with terrific performances and a tangible atmosphere." At Screen International, Fionnuala Halligan described The Narrow Road as a "tender, thoughtful film" that "deliver[s] a subtle and affecting portrait of a difficult time in a unique place", and "a love song to [the director's] city and the low-paid labour on which it was founded".

== Awards and nominations ==
Awards	Category	Recipient	Result	Ref.
59th Golden Horse Awards	Best Leading Actor	Louis Cheung	Nominated	
59th Golden Horse Awards	Best Leading Actress	Angela Yuen	Nominated	
59th Golden Horse Awards	Best Original Film Score	Wong Hin-yan	Won	
59th Golden Horse Awards	FIPRESCI Prize	The Narrow Road	Nominated	
59th Golden Horse Awards	NETPAC Award	The Narrow Road	Nominated	
59th Golden Horse Awards	Observation Missions for Asian Cinema Award	The Narrow Road	Nominated	
29th Hong Kong Film Critics Society Awards	Best Film	The Narrow Road	Nominated	
29th Hong Kong Film Critics Society Awards	Best Director	Lam Sum	Won	
29th Hong Kong Film Critics Society Awards	Best Screenplay	Fean Chung	Nominated	
29th Hong Kong Film Critics Society Awards	Best Actor	Louis Cheung	Won	
29th Hong Kong Film Critics Society Awards	Best Actress	Angela Yuen	Nominated	
29th Hong Kong Film Critics Society Awards	Films of Merit	The Narrow Road	Won	
41st Hong Kong Film Awards	Best Film	The Narrow Road	Nominated	
41st Hong Kong Film Awards	Best Director	Lam Sum	Nominated	
41st Hong Kong Film Awards	Best Screenplay	Fean Chung Chu Fung	Nominated	
41st Hong Kong Film Awards	Best Actor	Louis Cheung	Nominated	
41st Hong Kong Film Awards	Best Actress	Angela Yuen	Nominated	
41st Hong Kong Film Awards	Best Supporting Actress	Patra Au	Nominated	
41st Hong Kong Film Awards	Best Cinematography	Meteor Cheung Yu Hon	Nominated	
41st Hong Kong Film Awards	Best Costume & Make Up Design	Bonnie Ho	Nominated	
41st Hong Kong Film Awards	Best Original Film Score	Wong Hin Yan	Won	
41st Hong Kong Film Awards	Best New Director	Lam Sum	Nominated	
