= Piercing I =

- Film poster
- Directed by: Liu Jian
- Written by: Liu Jian
- Produced by: Lynne Wang; Liu Jian
- Edited by: Liu Jian
- Release date: 12 June 2010 (Annecy Animation Film Festival)
- Running time: 73 minutes
- Country: China
- Language: Chinese

Piercing I (Chinese: 刺痛我) is a 2010 Chinese animated film directed by Liu Jian.

== Plot ==
Due to the financial crisis, many factories in China are forced to close their doors in late 2008.

Zhang Xiaojun loses his job in a shoe factory. One day, a supermarket guard beats him up, thinking Zhang is a thief. In vain, he asks the supermarket manager for financial redress. Zhang's dearest wish is to return to his village and become a farmer. But right before his departure, the police arrest him. The supermarket manager also has his problems. On a moonlit night, the storylines converge in a teahouse near the city rampart.

== Reception ==
It won the Asia Pacific Screen Award for Best Animated Feature Film at the 4th Asia Pacific Screen Awards.

== See also ==
- Have a Nice Day (film)
