= Compound Eyes of Tropical =

2022 stop motion animated film

Compound Eyes of Tropical (Chinese: 熱帶複眼) is a stop motion animated film by Zhang Xu-zhan. It was first presented at the Taipei Fine Arts Museum and had its world premiere at the Golden Horse Film Festival in the same year. The film was awarded the Best Animated Short Film at the 59th Golden Horse Awards.

== Plot ==
The film was adapted from the Southeast Asian folk story The Mouse and the Deer Crossing the River (Chinese: 鼠鹿過河). It is presented from the perspective of a fly's eyes, observing how the mouse and the deer navigate through the treacherous crocodile-infested river to reach the other side.

== Production ==
Compound Eyes of Tropical uses puppets made by a traditional Taiwanese paper art technique for death and funeral ceremonies and was shot by a stop motion technique frame-by-frame. The animation is around 16 minutes long and the film took three years to shoot. Through a fly's eyes, the image creates a multi-perspective montage. The film uses Taiwanese folk dance to reimagine the Southeast Asian folk story, presenting a cross-cultural interpretation with multiple viewpoints, using mirrors and shadows as metaphorical symbols for various themes. It highlights the underlying structural similarities in seemingly distinct world cultures.

== Awards ==
Year	Award	Category	Name	Outcome	Ref.
2022	45th Golden Harvest Awards	Best Music & Sound Design	Prairie WWWW, Feng Zi-ming	Won	
2022	45th Golden Harvest Awards	Grand Prize	Compound Eyes of Tropical	Won	
2022	45th Golden Harvest Awards	Critics Choice Award	Compound Eyes of Tropical	Won	
2022	59th Golden Horse Awards	Best Animated Short Film	Compound Eyes of Tropical	Won	
2023	21nd Taishin Art Awards	Visual Arts Award	Jungle Jungle—ZHANG XU zhan Solo Exhibition	Nominated	
2023	Animafest Zagreb World Festival of Animated Film	Special Award	Compound Eyes of Tropical	Won	
2023	25th Taipei Film Awards	Best Animation	Compound Eyes of Tropical	Nominated	
2023	25th Taipei Film Awards	Award for Outstanding Artistic Contribution - Performance/ Action Design	ZHANG XU Zhan, Raito LOW, CHEN Liang-jie	Nominated	

== Exhibitions ==
- 2023 Roppongi Art Night
- 2022 Jungle Jungle—ZHANG XU zhan Solo Exhibition at the Taipei Fine Arts Museum
