= Yu An-shun =

Taiwanese actor (born 1967)

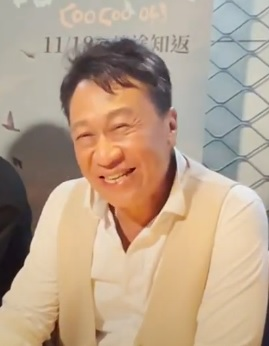
- Yu in November 2022
- Born: 5 November 1967 (age 57); Taipei, Taiwan
- Occupation: Actor
- Years active: 1985–present
- Spouses: Chang Chien (m. 1995; div. 2001) Chen Hsin-yu (m. 2009)
- Children: 2

Chinese name
- Traditional Chinese: 游安順
- Simplified Chinese: 游安顺
- Hanyu Pinyin: Yóu Ānshùn
- Hokkien POJ: Iû An-sūn

Yu An-shun (Chinese: 游安順; Pe̍h-ōe-jī: Iû An-sūn; born 5 November 1967) is a Taiwanese actor. He was the lead actor in Hou Hsiao-hsien's The Time to Live and the Time to Die (1985).

== Filmography ==
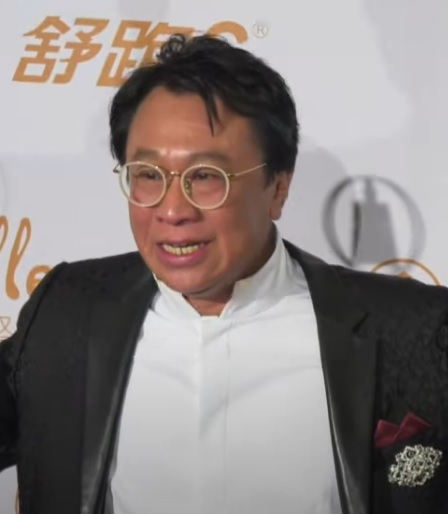
Yu at the 55th Golden Bell Awards in 2020

=== Film ===
Year	English title	Original title	Role	Notes
1985	The Time to Live and the Time to Die	童年往事	Hsiao-yen (teen)	
1986	Last Train to Tan Shui	我們的天空	Huang Rui	
1986	When Dreams Return	天倫夢回時		
1986	Terrorizers	恐怖分子	criminal	
1987	Daughter of the Nile	尼羅河女兒	Hsiao-yang's classmate	
1987	Farewell to the Channel	惜別海岸	Liu Fu-cheng	
1990	Whampoa Blues	壯志豪情	cadet	
1990	Flower Heart Hit Ghost	花心撞到鬼		
1992	Dust of Angels	少年吔，安啦！		
1996	Hi Sir	超級班長	Chen Wen-bin	
1997	Wolves Cry Under the Moon	國道封閉	semi-trailer owner	
2000	Everyone's Mistress	萬人情婦		TV film
2007	The Wall	牆之魘	Yee	
2013	Good Luck! Boy	加油!男孩	guard	
2013	Get Together	逗陣ㄟ	Mrs. Liu's brother	
2014	Kano	嘉農	Tsai	
2014	Exit	迴光奏鳴曲	Ling-tzu's brother-in-law	
2014	Taipei Factory II	台北工廠II	taxi driver	Segment 3: "The Thrill" (顫慄)
2015	Maverick	菜鳥	Brother Dong	
2016	The Tenants Downstairs	樓下的房客	Wang Ming-kai	
2017	The Great Buddha +	大佛普拉斯	Police officer	
2019	Nina Wu	灼人秘密	Uncle Wang	
2022	Coo-Coo 043	一家子兒咕咕叫	Ching	

=== Television series ===
Year	English title	Original title	Role	Notes
1990	Yes, Sir	大兵日記		
1993	Justice Pao	包青天		
1994	The Seven Heroes and Five Gallants	七俠五義	Han Zhang	
1996	Taiwan Paranormal Events	台灣靈異事件		
1997	The Strange Cases of Lord Shi	施公奇案		unrelated characters
1998	Gods Are Watching over You	舉頭三尺有神明		
2006	Unique Flavor	天下第一味		
2007	I Shall Succeed	我一定要成功		
2010	Year of the Rain	那年，雨不停國		
2010	Gloomy Salad Days	死神少女		
2011	Inborn Pair	真愛找麻煩		
2012	Feng Shui Family	風水世家		
2025	Zero Day	零日攻擊		

== Awards and nominations ==
Year	Award	Category	Work	Result
2007	42nd Golden Bell Awards	Best Actor		Nominated
2009	44th Golden Bell Awards	Best Actor		Nominated
2017	52nd Golden Bell Awards	Best Supporting Actor in a Television Series	Abula	Won
2022	59th Golden Horse Awards	Best Leading Actor	Coo-Coo 043	Nominated
2023	58th Golden Bell Awards	Best Supporting Actor in a Television Series	Oxcart Trails	Nominated
