= Caitlin Fang =

Taiwanese-American actress (born 2006)

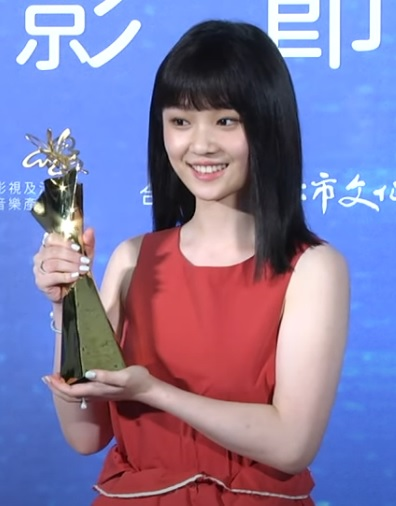
- Fang in 2022
- Born: May 17, 2006 (age 20); United States
- Education: Columbia University; Taipei American School
- Occupations: Student; actress
- Years active: 2021–present

Chinese name
- Traditional Chinese: 方郁婷
- Simplified Chinese: 方郁婷
- Hanyu Pinyin: Fāng Yùtíng

Caitlin Fang (Chinese: 方郁婷; born May 17, 2006) is a Taiwanese-American actress. She won the Golden Horse Award for Best New Performer and the Taipei Film Award for Best New Talent for her role in the film American Girl (2021). In 2022, at age 16, Fang became the youngest actor in the history of the Golden Horse Awards to receive nominations in all three acting categories; namely, Best Leading Actress, Best New Performer and Best Supporting Actress − with the former two for American Girl and the latter for The Post-Truth World (2022). She was also named as a SSR-level (Superior Super Rare) newcomer actress.

In June 2023, Caitlin Fang was selected, from over one hundred award-winning actors in the film and television industry of Taiwan, to be included in the Top Talents program; a collaboration between Taipei Film Festival and Taiwan Creative Content Agency (TAICCA) to promote Taiwanese talent to the world.

== Personal life ==
Caitlin Fang was born in the United States and moved back to Taipei when she was two years old. She graduated high school from Taipei American School and is currently pursuing a degree at Columbia University. Although she is a native English speaker, she worked closely with a Chinese language teacher to refine her Mandarin accent for her role in The Post-Truth World.

== Filmography ==
=== Film ===
| Year | English title | Original title | Role | Notes/Ref. |
|---|---|---|---|---|
| 2021 | American Girl | 美國女孩 | Liang Fang-yi (Fen) | |
| 2022 | The Post-Truth World | 罪後真相 | Liu Chen-chen | |
| 2023 | Tales of Taipei | 愛情城事 | Elise | |
| 2025 | A Foggy Tale | 大濛 | A-Yue | |
| 2026 | Bliss:Beyond the Edge of Time | 極樂 | Dorothy (voice role) | Episode: Paradise L05T |

=== Short film ===
| Year | English title | Original title | Role | Notes/Ref. |
|---|---|---|---|---|
| 2021 | Enchanted | 著迷 | Popcorn girl | Short film (58th Golden Horse Awards opening act) |
| 2023 | Cry Me Through Hell | 地獄催淚部 | Wei Chong | |
| 2023 | Be Natural | 自然一點 | | |

=== Television ===
| Year | English title | Original title | Role | Notes/Ref. |
|---|---|---|---|---|
| 2024 | Not a Murder Story | 茁劇場－非殺人小說 | Chen Zi-Jie | Released on Catchplay+, iQIYI & GTV |
| 2025 | The Resurrected | 回魂計 | Hsu Hsin-Yi | Released on Netflix |

=== Music video appearances ===
| Year | Artist | Song title |
|---|---|---|
| 2020 | Wendy Wander | "Rang Wo Zhu Jin Ni Xin Li" |
| 2022 | 831 | "Wo Bu Xiang Ni Xiang Ni Le" |
| 2022 | JJ Lin | "We Will" |

== Awards and nominations ==
| Year | Award | Category | Nominated work | Result | Ref. |
|---|---|---|---|---|---|
| 2021 | 58th Golden Horse Awards | Best Leading Actress | American Girl | Nominated | |
| 2021 | 58th Golden Horse Awards | Best New Performer | American Girl | Won | |
| 2022 | 3rd Taiwan Film Critics Society | Best Actress | American Girl | Nominated | |
| 2022 | 24th Taipei Film Awards | Best Actress | American Girl | Nominated | |
| 2022 | 24th Taipei Film Awards | Best New Talent | American Girl | Won | |
| 2022 | 59th Golden Horse Awards | Best Supporting Actress | The Post-Truth World | Nominated | |
| 2023 | 25th Taipei Film Awards | Best Supporting Actress | The Post-Truth World | Nominated | |
| 2025 | 62nd Golden Horse Awards | Best Leading Actress | A Foggy Tale | Nominated | |
| 2026 | 7th Taiwan Film Critics Society | Best Actress | A Foggy Tale | Nominated | |
| 2026 | 28th Taipei Film Awards | Best Actress | A Foggy Tale | Nominated | |
| 2026 | 61st Golden Bell Awards | Best Supporting Actress in a Miniseries or Television Film | The Resurrected | Nominated | |
