= Liu Jian (director) =

Chinese animator and film director

- Education: Nanjing University of the Arts
- Occupations: Film director; producer; screenwriter; animator
- Years active: 1995–present

Liu Jian (simplified Chinese: 刘健; traditional Chinese: 劉健; pinyin: Liú Jiàn) is a Chinese animator and film director based in Nanjing.

== Life and career ==
Having originally studied painting at Nanjing University of the Arts, he began making animations in 1995. In 2007 he founded Le-joy Animation Studio. His first full-length animation Piercing I premiered at the Holland Animation Film Festival. His second feature-length film, the black comedy Have a Nice Day premiered in competition at the 2017 Berlin International Film Festival and won Best Animation Feature at the 54th Golden Horse Awards.

== Filmography ==
- Piercing I (2010)
- Have a Nice Day (2017)
- Art College 1994 (2023)

== See also ==
- Independent animation
- Arthouse animation
- Cinema of China
