= 59th Golden Horse Awards =

Award ceremony for Chinese-language films of 2021 and 2022

- Promotional poster
- Date: November 19, 2022
- Site: Sun Yat-sen Memorial Hall, Taipei, Taiwan
- Hosted by: Hsieh Ying-xuan
- Preshow hosts: Pink Yang; Wu Nien-hsuan
- Organized by: Taipei Golden Horse Film Festival Executive Committee

Highlights
- Best Feature Film: Coo-Coo 043
- Best Director: Laha Mebow; Gaga
- Best Actor: Anthony Wong; The Sunny Side of the Street
- Best Actress: Sylvia Chang; A Light Never Goes Out
- Most awards: Limbo (4)
- Most nominations: Limbo (14)

Television in Taiwan
- Network: TTV; Taiwan Mobile myVideo (Internet)

The 59th Golden Horse Awards (simplified Chinese: 第59届金马奖; traditional Chinese: 第59屆金馬獎; pinyin: Dì 59 jiè jīnmǎ jiǎng) was held on November 19, 2022, at the Sun Yat-sen Memorial Hall in Taipei, Taiwan. Organized by the Taipei Golden Horse Film Festival Executive Committee, the awards honored the best in Chinese-language films of 2021 and 2022. Nominations were announced on September 27, 2022. Despite receiving the warning from Chinese authorities, Hong Kong action thriller Limbo led the nominations with 14, while Taiwanese films Incantation and Coo-Coo 043 each received 13 nominations.

Taiwanese drama Coo-Coo 043 won Best Narrative Feature, while Limbo was the biggest winner overall with 4 awards, mostly won technical categories, followed by The Sunny Side of the Street with 3, including Best Leading Actor.

== Winners and nominees ==
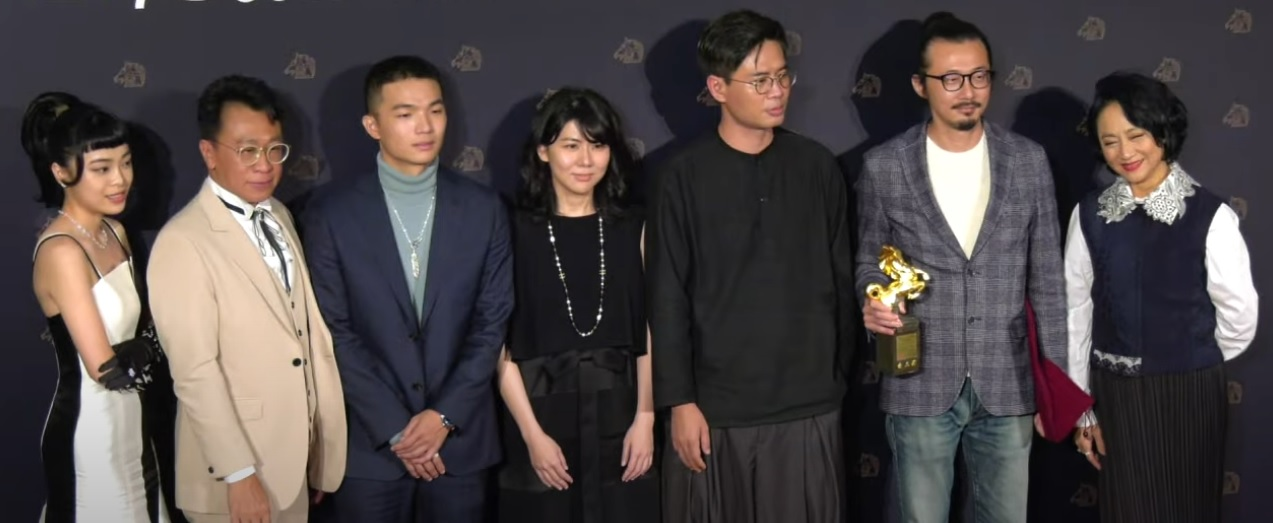
Cast and crew members of Coo-Coo 043 (winner for Best Narrative Feature)

Winners are listed first and highlighted in boldface.

**Best Narrative Feature**: **Coo-Coo 043**; Incantation; Gaga; Limbo; The Sunny Side of the Street	**Best Documentary Feature**: **And Miles to Go Before I Sleep**; Silence in the Dust; A Holy Family; The King of Wuxia; Blue Island
**Best Animated Feature** -	**Best Live Action Short Film**: **Can You Hear Me?**; To the Sea; Big Day; Frontier; The Thing with Feathers
**Best Documentary Short Film**: **Will You Look at Me**; The Lighting; Between the Stars and Waves; Kaohsiung City, Yancheng District, Fubei Rd., No. 31; The Black Wall	**Best Animated Short Film**: **Compound Eyes of Tropical**; The Loach; A Dog Under Bridge; The Island of Us; A Night with Moosina
**Best Director**: **Laha Mebow — Gaga**; Kevin Ko — Incantation; Chang Tso-chi — Flotsam and Jetsam; Cheang Pou-soi — Limbo; Chan Ching-lin — Coo-Coo 043	**Best Leading Actor**: **Anthony Wong — The Sunny Side of the Street**; Louis Cheung — The Narrow Road; Gordon Lam — Limbo; Joseph Chang — The Post-Truth World; Yu An-shun — Coo-Coo 043
**Best Leading Actress**: **Sylvia Chang — A Light Never Goes Out**; Tsai Hsuan-yen — Incantation; Angela Yuen — The Narrow Road; Cya Liu — Limbo; Hong Huifang — Ajoomma	**Best Supporting Actor**: **Berant Zhu — Bad Education**; Kao Ying-hsuan — Incantation; Mason Lee — Limbo; Jung Dong-hwan — Ajoomma; Hu Jhih-ciang — Coo-Coo 043
**Best Supporting Actress**: **Kagaw Piling — Gaga**; Jennifer Yu — Far Far Away; Caitlin Fang — The Post-Truth World; Yang Li-yin — Coo-Coo 043; Rimong Ihwar — Coo-Coo 043	**Best New Director**: **Lau Kok Rui — The Sunny Side of the Street**; Kai Ko — Bad Education; He Shu-ming — Ajoomma; Tseng Ying-ting — The Abandoned; Hong Heng-fai — Kissing the Ground You Walked On
**Best New Performer**: **Hu Jhih-ciang — Coo-Coo 043**; Huang Sin-ting — Incantation; Yukan Losing — Gaga; Eric Chou — My Best Friend's Breakfast; Sahal Zaman — The Sunny Side of the Street	**Best Original Screenplay**: **Lau Kok Rui — The Sunny Side of the Street**; Chang Che-wei and Kevin Ko — Incantation; Laha Mebow and Hsieh Hui-ching — Gaga; He Shu-ming and Kris Ong — Ajoomma; Chan Ching-lin — Coo-Coo 043
**Best Adapted Screenplay**: **Au Kin-yee and Shum Kwan-sin — Limbo**; Ryan Tu — My Best Friend's Breakfast	**Best Cinematography**: **Cheng Siu-Keung — Limbo**; Chen Ko-chin — Incantation; Leung Ming Kai — The Sunny Side of the Street; Yao Hung-i — Salute; Charlie Sou — Kissing the Ground You Walked On
**Best Visual Effects**: **Garrett Lam, Ho Man-lok and Diu King-wai — Limbo**; Huang Min-pin, Hsieh Meng-cheng, Lu Kuan-sang and Li Che-cheng — Incantation; ArChin Yen — Bad Education; Dennis Yeung — A Light Never Goes Out	**Best Art Direction**: **Mak Kwok-keung and Renee Wong — Limbo**; Otto Chen — Incantation; Lin Tien-yu, Tseng Hao-ming and Lin Chih-wei — Demigod: The Legend Begins; Yeh Tzu-wei — The Abandoned; Chang Yi-feng — Coo-Coo 043
**Best Makeup & Costume Design**: **Ken Fan and Chen You-feng — Demigod: The Legend Begins**; Dong Yan-xiu and Chu Chia-yi — Incantation; Bruce Yu Ka-on and Karen Yip — Limbo; Lore Shih and Chang Fu-chen — The Abandoned; Emma Chen — Coo-Coo 043	**Best Action Choreography**: **Sheu Fang-yi — Salute**; Liao Jia-sheng, Lin Kuei-hsieh and Chuang Jen-ming — Demigod: The Legend Begins; Jack Wong Wai-leung — Limbo; Hung Shih-hao — The Abandoned; Sunny Pang — Geylang
**Best Original Film Score**: **Wong Hin-yan — The Narrow Road**; Rockid Lee — Incantation; Kenji Kawai — Limbo; Lee Che-yi and Lim Giong — Salute; Point Hsu — Coo-Coo 043	**Best Original Film Song**: **"What's on Your Mind" — My Best Friend's Breakfast**; **Composer: Eric Chou**; **Lyrics: Eric Chou and Wu I-wei**; **Performer: Eric Chou**; "Là vì em" — And Miles to Go Before I Sleep; Composer: Shih Min-chieh; Lyrics: Nguyen Quoc-phi; Performer: Lai Hsueh-ching; "Around The Hearth" — Gaga; Composer: Baobu Badulu; Lyrics: Laha Mebow and Baobu Badulu; Performer: Ali Batu; "A Place of Eternity" — Untold Herstory; Composer: Olivia Tsao; Lyrics: Olivia Tsao; Performer: Olivia Tsao
**Best Film Editing**: **Kevin Ko — Incantation**; Huang Yi-ling — A Holy Family; David Richardson — Limbo; Shieh Meng-ju and Lee Huey — Bad Education; Chan Ching-lin, Ian Lin and Chen Pei-ying — Coo-Coo 043	**Best Sound Effects**: **R.T Kao, Rockid Lee and Richard Hocks — Incantation**; Nopawat Likitwong — Limbo; R.T Kao, Tsai Doit and Kenny Cheng — The Abandoned; Ellison Lau Chi-keong — Kissing the Ground You Walked On; Tu Duu-chih, Chiang Yi-chen, Chen Yu-chieh — Coo-Coo 043
**Audience Choice Award** **(picked by 423 audience members who watched the Best Narrative Feature nominated entries in its entirety)**: **Limbo**; Incantation; Gaga; The Sunny Side of the Street; Coo-Coo 043	**FIPRESCI Prize** **(award for first and second features)**: **Coo-Coo 043**; My Best Friend's Breakfast; The Narrow Road; Bad Education; A Light Never Goes Out; The Sunny Side of the Street; Ajoomma; The Abandoned; The Post-Truth World; Geylang; Kissing the Ground You Walked On
**NETPAC Award** **(award for feature films by Asian new talent)**: **Autobiography**; Coo-Coo 043; Bad Education; The Sunny Side of the Street; The Narrow Road; Ajoomma; Kissing the Ground You Walked On; Jeong-sun; Roleless; Arnold Is a Model Student	**Observation Missions for Asian Cinema Award** **(picked from NETPAC Award nominated entries)**: **Autobiography**; **Jeong-sun**; Coo-Coo 043; Bad Education; The Sunny Side of the Street; The Narrow Road; Ajoomma; Kissing the Ground You Walked On; Roleless; Arnold Is a Model Student
**Outstanding Taiwanese Filmmaker of the Year**: **Chen Ming-ze**	**Lifetime Achievement Award**: **Lai Cheng-ying**; **Chang Chao-Tang**

== The ceremony ==
- Cinematographer Mark Lee Ping-bing leads the awards executive committee for the first time, taking over the duties of former head Ang Lee.
- The 59th Golden Horse Awards is tentatively the last edition held at the Taipei Sun Yat-sen Memorial Hall, as the venue undergoes refurbishment til 2025.
- The Narrow Road was disqualified from the Best Original Film Song nomination ("On the Road"), after the awards executive committee was informed by the film distributor MM2 Studios that the song had been publicly performed prior to the film production.
- The 17-person jury unanimously decided Anthony Wong (The Sunny Side of the Street) as the winner for Best Leading Actor, Hu Jhih-ciang (Coo-Coo 043) for Best New Performer, and Limbo for Best Cinematography and Best Adapted Screenplay, among others.
- There were also 7 award categories where the winners were a close call (9 votes versus 8 votes), the most categories in the awards history. They were:
  - Coo-Coo 043 winning Limbo (Best Narrative Feature)
  - Laha Mebow (Gaga) winning Cheang Pou-soi (Limbo) for Best Director
  - Sylvia Chang (A Light Never Goes Out) winning Cya Liu (Limbo) for Best Leading Actress
  - Kagaw Piling (Gaga) winning Yang Li-yin (Coo-Coo 043) for Best Supporting Actress
  - Sheu Fang-yi (Salute) winning Jack Wong Wai-leung (Limbo) for Best Action Choreography
  - And Miles to Go Before I Sleep winning Silence in the Dust for Best Documentary Feature
  - Will You Look at Me winning Kaohsiung City, Yancheng District, Fubei Rd., No. 31 for Best Documentary Short Film.
- No jury member raised the possibility of a tie (split between two winners) for all the 23 award categories.

== Jury ==
Winners will be jointly voted by six final stage jurors, along with eleven shortlist stage jurors who earlier decided the nominees.

=== Final stage jurors ===
- Ann Hui, Hong Kong filmmaker (Jury President)
- Gwei Lun-mei, Taiwanese actress
- Chang Chen, Taiwanese actor
- Cheng Wei-hao, Taiwanese filmmaker
- Yeh Ju-feng, Taiwanese film producer
- Yu Jing-pin, Taiwanese cinematographer

=== Shortlist stage jurors ===
- Chou I-wen, Taiwanese cinematographer
- Chiu Li-wei, Taiwanese animation director
- Silver Cheung, Hong Kong production designer
- Chang Jung-chi, Taiwanese film director
- Chang Yao-sheng, Taiwanese filmmaker and novelist
- Allen Leung, Hong Kong film editor
- Huang Hui-chen, Taiwanese documentary filmmaker
- Essay Liu, Taiwanese screenwriter
- Henry Tsai, Taiwanese filmmaker
- Penny Tsai, Taiwanese production designer
- Henry Lai, Hong Kong composer

=== FIPRESCI Prize jury ===
- Ernesto Diezmartínez, Mexican film critic
- Estella Huang, Taiwanese film critic and writer
- Jason Tan Liwag, Filipino scientist, actor, writer and film programmer

=== NETPAC Award jury ===
- Cecilia Wong, Hong Kong film critic and film programmer
- Singing Chen, Taiwanese film director
- Tan Tang-mo, Taiwanese film critic

== See also ==
- 40th Hong Kong Film Awards
