= Laha Mebow =

Taiwanese film director

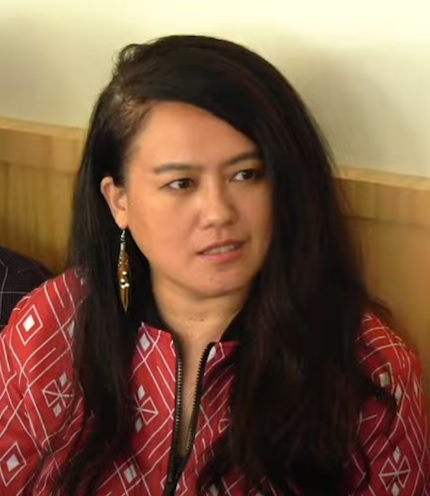
- Laha Mebow in October 2022
- Born: 5 December 1975 (age 50); Nan'ao, Yilan, Taiwan
- Other name: Chen Jieyao
- Education: Shih Hsin University
- Occupations: Film director, screenwriter

Chinese name
- Traditional Chinese: 陳潔瑤
- Simplified Chinese: 陈洁瑶
- Hanyu Pinyin: Chén Jiéyáo

Laha Mebow (Chinese: 陳潔瑤; pinyin: Chén Jiéyáo; born 5 December 1975) is a Taiwanese Atayal film director, screenwriter and television producer. She is notable for directing the films Hang in There, Kids! for which she won two awards at the Taipei Film Festival, and Gaga, winning multiple Golden Horse and Taipei Film Festival awards, including best director and best narrative feature. She is widely considered to be the first female Taiwanese indigenous film director and TV producer.

== Life ==
Laha Mebow was born in 1975 in Nan-ao, Taiwan. She was raised in Taichung by her father who was a police officer and her mother who was a teacher. After graduating from Shih Hsin University with a degree in film she later joined Taiwan Indigenous Television where she learned more about her heritage and indigenous culture.

== Career ==
After graduating, Mebow worked in assistant directing, scriptwriting, and production for prominent Taiwanese directors such as Tsai Ming-liang and Chang Tso-chi. She began working at Taiwan Indigenous Television at 30, where she began her journey to reclaim her indigenous identity, producing documentaries and programs focusing on indigenous issues. Mebow’s work is noted for its use of non-professional indigenous actors, community-centered production methods, and focus on authentic storytelling rather than exoticization or tourism-based portrayals of indigenous life. Her films engage with themes such as colonial legacy, intergenerational memory, rural youth, and Austronesian identity. In 2015, she received the Top Ten Outstanding Young Women Award from the Taiwan government for her contributions to indigenous cultural promotion and international exchange.

Mebow emphasizes participatory filmmaking rooted in community trust, cultural responsibility, and authenticity. She often spends extended time with local communities before filming, avoiding scripted rehearsals and encouraging actors to “play themselves.” Her approach counters commercial or exotic portrayals of indigenous people, focusing instead on lived experience, relationships, and subjective representation, marking her as a pioneer of indigenous cinema in Taiwan. She has reshaped how indigenous communities are portrayed on screen, which was moving away from exoticism and cultural stereotyping and toward self-representation, community agency, and relational filmmaking. Her work continues to inspire indigenous filmmakers across Taiwan and the wider Austronesian region.

=== Finding Sayun ===
In 2011, Laha Mebow made her directorial debut with Finding Sayun, a film which focuses on the stories of contemporary Atayal people in Yilan looking back to the impact on their community during the Japanese colonial period and during and after the arrival of the KMT in Taiwan. She cast the film using mainly non-professional indigenous actors and set it in her home village of Tyohemg in Yilan County. The film was released in 2011 to a mixed review by the Taipei Times but was well received by audiences. In 2015, Mebow received a Republic of China Top 10 Outstanding Young Women Award.

=== Hang in There, Kids! ===
The following year, she directed her second film Hang in There, Kids!, a coming of age story about three indigenous children growing up in a remote indigenous township. The film was so well received that Taiwan's Ministry of Culture selected it as the country's entry into the Academy Award for Best Foreign Language Film. Although it failed to be nominated for the Academy Award, the film went on to win five categories at the Taipei Film Festival including Best Director and Best Narrative Feature, as well as a special award at the WorldFest-Houston International Film Festival.

=== Ça Fait Si Longtemps ===
Mebow is also the director of the 2017 feature-length documentary film Ça Fait Si Longtemps, which tracks the travels of singer-composer-actor Suming Rupi and guitarist Baobu Badulu, documenting their relationship with Indigenous Kanak and settler musicians of New Caledonia. Through the sharing of their love for music, the musicians featured in this film seek to redefine their own roots and heritage, marking a coming-together film among Indigenous peoples across the Pacific.

=== Gaga ===
Gaga has been noted for its authentic portrayal of Atayal Indigenous life. Focusing on the gradual erosion and transformation of gaga, the community’s traditional moral and social code unravels through everyday events such as land disputes, intergenerational tensions, unplanned pregnancy, and communal rituals, depicting how tradition interacts with modernity without exoticizing Indigenous culture. The film’s visual style contrasts rural tradition with modern influences, reflecting how younger generations move toward Mandarin, English, and contemporary lifestyles while others seek to preserve ancestral customs. Through this film, Mebow became the first Taiwanese woman and first Indigenous filmmaker to win Best Director at the 59th Golden Horse Awards in 2022, where she proposed and described her filmmaking as a form of cultural “weaving,” aiming to bridge Indigenous and mainstream audiences.

=== Tayal Forest Club ===
Tayal Forest Club is a 19-minute Taiwanese short film directed by Laha Mebow about the coming-of-age story that follows two Atayal teenagers, Yukan and Watan, on a hike into their mountainous ancestral homelands. Filmed in Pyanan, a remote Atayal village in Yilan at an altitude of 1,500 meters, the work marks Mebow’s first exploration of ancestral spirit concepts and portrays the bond between youth, land, and cultural memory. The film was screened at the 47th Asian American International Film Festival in New York on August 11, 2024, as part of the “A Field Guide to the Natural World” program. It later won the International Jury Special Mention award at the 2025 Clermont-Ferrand International Short Film Festival in France, where it was selected from 64 entries, earning international recognition for Taiwanese Indigenous cinema.

=== The Skull Oracle ===
The Skull Oracle is an upcoming feature film, marking Mebow’s first exploration of spiritual fantasy rooted in Tayal shamanic heritage. Inspired by the life of her grandmother and the suppressed legacy of Indigenous shamanism, the film blends tribal legend, intergenerational trauma, and contemporary identity. This film is produced by Eric Liang, who also collaborated with Mebow on Finding Sayun and Gaga, and was presented at Busan’s Asian Project Market in September 2025, aiming to build an international team that combines cultural depth with commercial reach.

== Filmography ==
- Finding Sayun (不一樣的月光) 2011, Drama (Director, Screenwriter)
- Hang in There, Kids! (只要我長大) 2016, Drama (Director, Screenwriter)
- Ça Fait Si Longtemps (漂流遇見你) 2017, Documentary (Director)
- Gaga (哈勇家) 2022, Drama (Director, Screenwriter)
- Tayal Forest Club (男孩奇幻夜) 2024, Drama (Director, Screenwriter)
- The Skull Oracle (聖女頭顱) Pre-Production (Expected 2027), Fantasy (Director)

== Awards and nominations ==
Year	Ceremony	Award	Film	Results
2008	Government Information Office Excellent Screenplay	Excellent Screenplay Award	Finding Sayun (不一樣的月光)	Won
2012	ROC, 101 Golden Harvest Awards (金穗獎)	Excellent Screenplay Honorable Mention Award	Hang in There, Kids! (只要我長大)	Won
2015	23rd Ten Young Outstanding Women Awards (十大傑出女青年獎)	Ten Young Outstanding Women Award (十大傑出女青年獎)	n/a	Won
2016	Hong Kong Asian Film Festival	New Talent Award	Hang in There, Kids! (只要我長大)	Nominated
2016	18th Taipei Film Awards	Best Feature Film Best Narrative Feature Audience Choice Award Best Director	Hang in There, Kids! (只要我長大)	Won
2016	53rd Golden Horse Awards	Best Original Screenplay Best Original Film Song	Hang in There, Kids! (只要我長大)	Nominated Won
2017	WorldFest-Houston International Film Festival	Special Jury Remi Award	Hang in There, Kids! (只要我長大)	Won
2017	46th Giffoni Film Festival	CIAL Prize for the Environment	Hang in There, Kids! (只要我長大)	Won
2017	Youth Film Manual Annual Award	Best Screenplay	Hang in There, Kids! (只要我長大)	Nominated
2017	Chinese Film (Ningbo-Cixi) Festival	CCF Award for Outstanding Film	Hang in There, Kids! (只要我長大)	Won
2022	59th Golden Horse Awards	Best Narrative Feature Best Director Award Best Original Screenplay Best Original Film Song	Gaga (哈勇家)	Nominated Won Nominated Nominated
2022	Singapore International Film Festival (Asian Feature Film Competition)	Best Director Award	Gaga (哈勇家)	Won
2022	4th Taiwan Film Critics Society Awards	Best Film Best Director Best Screenplay	Gaga (哈勇家)	Nominated Won Won
2023	Seattle International Film Festival	Best Director	Gaga (哈勇家)	Nominated
2023	25th Taipei Film Awards	Best Narrative Feature Best Director Best Screenplay	Gaga (哈勇家)	Won Nominated Nominated
