= Geylang (film) =

2022 Singaporean crime film

- Theatrical release poster
- Traditional Chinese: 芽籠
- Simplified Chinese: 芽笼
- Hanyu Pinyin: Yá lóng
- Directed by: Boi Kwong
- Written by: Link Sng
- Produced by: Boi Kwong; Jimz Lee
- Starring: Mark Lee; Sheila Sim; Shane Mardjuki; Gary Lau; Patricia Lin
- Cinematography: Ronnie Ching
- Edited by: Neo Rui Xin; Jacen Chan
- Music by: Alex Oh
- Production companies: mm2 Entertainment; J Team Productions
- Distributed by: mm2 Entertainment
- Release dates: 2 November 2022 (Taipei Golden Horse); 6 April 2023 (Singapore); 10 August 2023 (Malaysia); 22 September 2023 (Taiwan); 2 November 2023 ( Amazon Prime Video Singapore)
- Running time: 87 minutes
- Country: Singapore
- Languages: Mandarin; Hokkien; English

Geylang (Chinese: 芽笼) is a 2022 Singaporean crime thriller film produced and directed by Boi Kwong. The second feature film by Kwong, the film is set in the red-light district of Geylang and revolves around the intertwined fates of five individuals over the course of one night. It had its world premiere at the Taipei Golden Horse Film Festival in November 2022 and was released in theatres on 6 April 2023.

== Cast ==
- Mark Lee as Fatty
- Sheila Sim as Celine
- Shane Mardjuki as Dr. Sun
- Gary Lau as Jie
- Patricia Lin as Shangri-La
- Agung Bagus as Yunji
- Benny Se Teo as Hor Sin
- Eric Chow as Five Ji
- Lee V.Feto as Lowot

== Release ==
Following its world premiere at the Taipei Golden Horse Film Festival, the film subsequently screened at the Singapore International Film Festival and also at the International Film Festival Rotterdam in the Netherlands in January 2023.

== Critical reception ==
In a review for 8 Days, Tay Yek Keak rated the film 3 out of 5 stars. Tay praised Mark Lee's portrayal as the "beleaguered but good-hearted" pimp Fatty, but felt the film was too over-the-top.

== Awards and nominations ==
Awards	Category	Recipient	Result	Ref.
59th Golden Horse Awards	Best Action Choreography	Sunny Pang	Nominated	
59th Golden Horse Awards	FIPRESCI Prize	—N/a	Nominated	
