= Have a Nice Day (film) =

2017 Chinese adult animated film

- Film poster
- Directed by: Liu Jian
- Written by: Liu Jian
- Produced by: Liu Jian; Yang Cheng
- Starring: Yang Siming; Cao Kou; Ma Xiaofeng; Zhu Changlong; Cao Kai; Zheng Yi
- Cinematography: Lin Shan
- Edited by: Minbing Xiaoliu; Liu Jian
- Music by: The Shanghai Restoration Project
- Production companies: Nezha Bros. Pictures; Le-joy Animation Studio
- Release date: 17 February 2017 (Berlin)
- Running time: 75 minutes
- Country: China
- Language: Mandarin (Nanjing dialect)
- Budget: Less than CN¥10 million

Have a Nice Day (Chinese: 大世界; pinyin: Dàshìjiè) is a 2017 Chinese adult animated black comedy crime-thriller film directed by Liu Jian. It premiered in the main competition for the Golden Bear at the 67th Berlin International Film Festival in February 2017. It is Liu Jian's second feature film, following his debut Piercing I. The film, mostly done by Liu himself, took three years to complete.

Its plot revolves around the journey of Xiao Zhang, a young driver working for a gang, who steals a bag from his boss containing a million yuan (approximately US$150,000) to fund a trip to South Korea for his girlfriend to save her failed plastic surgery in Nanjing, Jiangsu.

The film was withdrawn from the Annecy International Animated Film Festival in June 2017 at its producer's demand as it did not have proper governmental clearance to be screened internationally.

Strand Releasing distributed the film in US while Memento Films International handled additional territories including the UK, Mexico, Spain, Benelux, Switzerland, Greece, Turkey and Eastern Europe. The film has been licensed to screen in more than 30 countries. In China, the premiere of the film took place at the Pingyao International Film Festival in early November 2017, with a guest appearance by Chinese film director Jia Zhangke, who praised the film as a milestone in Chinese animation.

The film won Best Animation Feature at the 54th Golden Horse Awards.

== Cast ==
| Character | Chinese Voice actor | English voice actor |
|---|---|---|
| Xiao Zhang, the driver | Zhu Changlong | |
| Lao Zhao | Cao Kai | |
| Fang Yuanjun | Liu Jian | |
| Uncle Liu | Yang Siming | |
| A De | Shi Haitao | |
| Shou Pi | Ma Xiaofeng | |
| Lao San | Xue Feng | |
| Er Jie | Zheng Yi | |
| Huang Yan | Cao Kou | |
| Gu Anan | Zhu Hong | |
