= Golden Horse Award for Best Sound Effects =

Taiwanese film award

- Awarded for: Best Sound Effects
- Location: Taiwan
- Presented by: Taipei Golden Horse Film Festival Executive Committee
- First award: 1962
- Currently held by: R.T Kao, Rockid Lee and Richard Hocks for Incantation (2022)
- Website: www.goldenhorse.org.tw

The Golden Horse Award for Best Sound Effects (Chinese: 金馬獎最佳音效) is an award presented annually at the Golden Horse Awards by the Taipei Golden Horse Film Festival Executive Committee. The latest ceremony was held in 2022, with R.T Kao, Rockid Lee and Richard Hocks winning the award for the film Incantation.
