= Golden Horse Award for Best Original Film Song =

Taiwanese film award

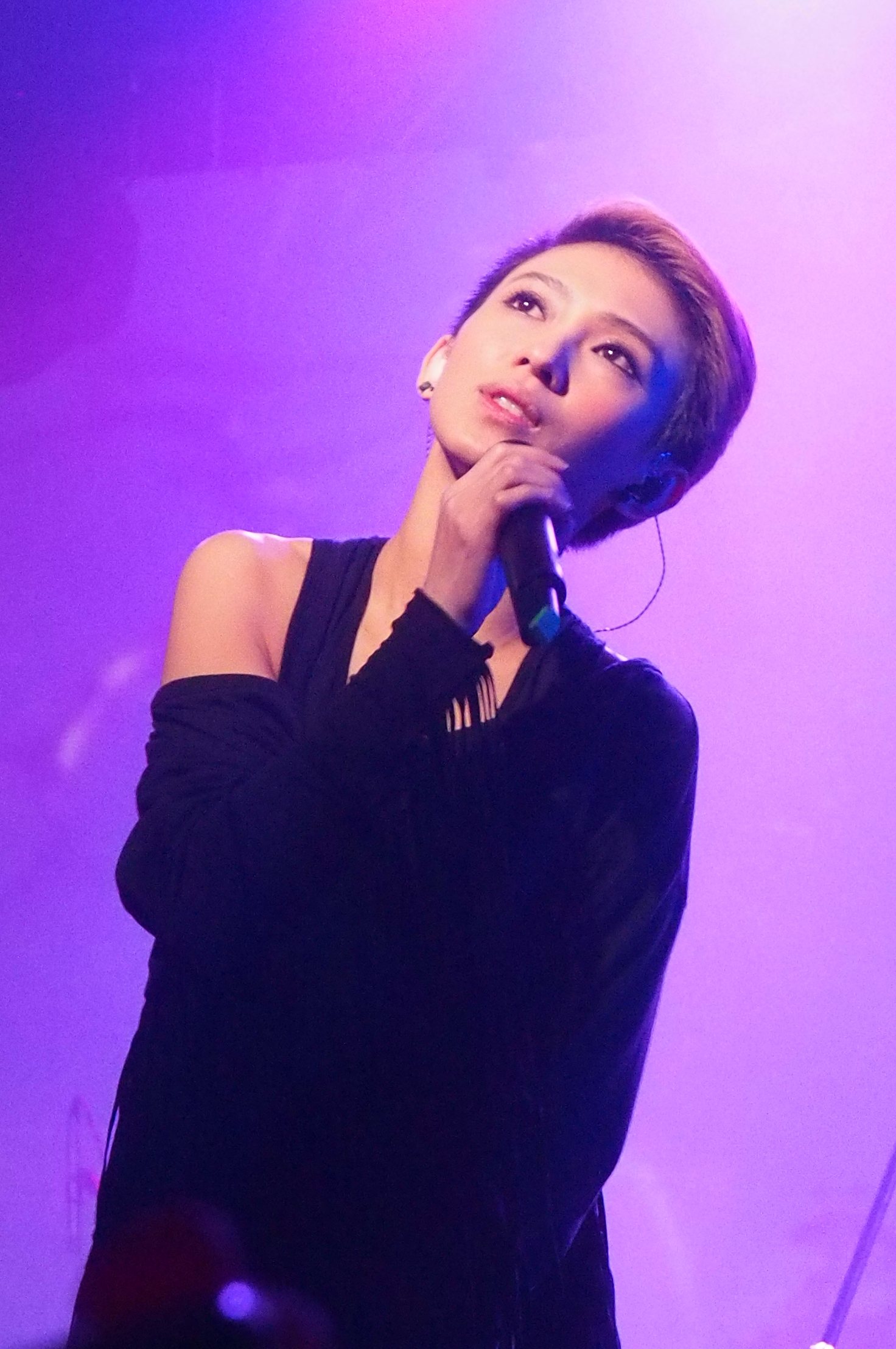
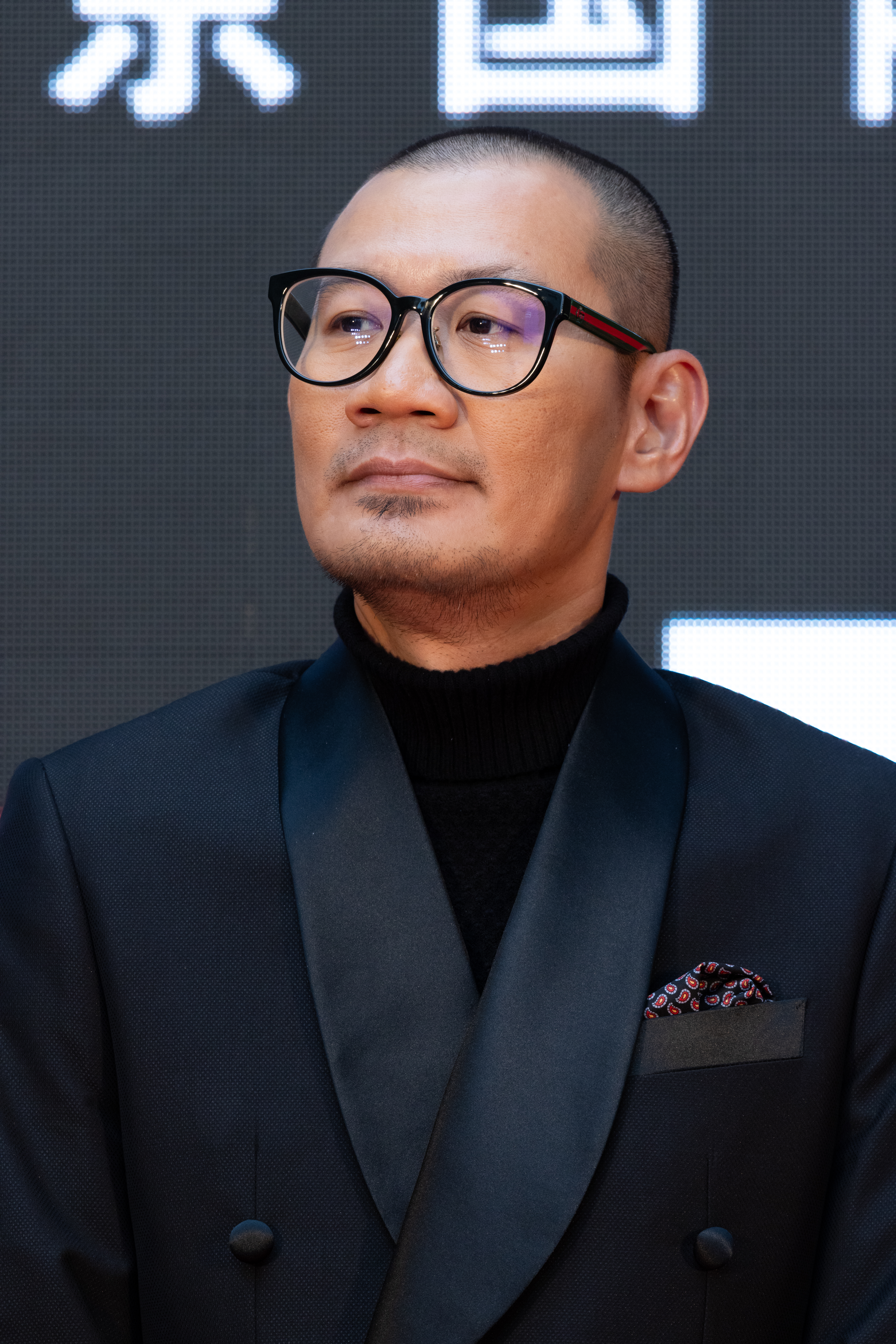
- The 2025 co-recipients: Penny Tai and Chong Keat Aun
- Awarded for: Best Original Film Song
- Country: Taiwan
- Presented by: Taipei Golden Horse Film Festival Executive Committee
- First award: 1962
- Currently held by: Penny Tai, Chong Keat Aun "Bhujanga" from Mother Bhumi (2025)
- Website: goldenhorse.org.tw

The Golden Horse Award for Best Original Film Song (Chinese: 金馬獎最佳原創電影歌曲) is presented annually at Taiwan's Golden Horse Film Awards. The latest ceremony was held on November 22, 2025, with the award going to the song "Bhujanga" from the film Mother Bhumi.

== Winners and nominees ==
indicates the winner

=== 2000s ===
Year	Film	Song	Original title	Recipient(s)
2007 (44th)	Secret	"Secret"	不能說的‧祕密	Vincent Fang (lyricist); Jay Chou (composer & performer)
2008 (45th)	Cape No. 7	"Southern Country"	國境之南	Matthew Yen (lyricist); Tseng Chi Hao (composer); Van Fan (performer)
2009 (46th)	Death Dowry	"For My Heart"	遇见	Zeng Yan (lyricist & composer); Tao Hong (performer); Tan Weiwei (performer)

=== 2010s ===
Year	Film	Song	Original title	Recipient(s)
2010 (47th)	Taipei Exchanges	"Taipei Exchanges"	第36個故事	Summer Lei (lyricist & composer & performer)
2011 (48th)	Jump Ashin!	"Perfect Landing"	完美落地	Luantan Ascent (lyricist & composer & performer)
2012 (49th)	Romancing in Thin Air	"DoReMi"		Lin Xi (lyricist); Lo TaYou (composer); Sammi Cheng (performer)
2013 (50th)	Rock Me To The Moon	"I Love You"		Spark Chen (lyricist & composer); Sleepy Dads (performer)
2014 (51st)	The Continent	"The Road We Pass"	平凡之路	Pu Shu (lyricist & composer & performer); Han Han (lyricist)
2015 (52nd)	Panay	"Aka Pisawad"	不要放棄	Suming (lyricist & composer & performer)
2016 (53rd)	Ola Bola	"Arena Cahaya"		Zee Avi (lyricist & composer & performer); Rendra Zawawi (lyricist & composer)

=== 2020s ===
Year	Film	Song	Original title	Recipient(s)
2020 (57th)	Your Name Engraved Herein	"Your Name Engraved Herein"	刻在我心底的名字	Keon Chia (lyricist & composer); Tan Boon Wah (lyricist & composer); Hooi Yuan-teng (lyricist & composer); Crowd Lu (performer); Edward Chen (performer)
2020 (57th)	Babi	"Happy Family"		Namewee (lyricist & composer & performer); 5forty2 (lyricist & performer); The Real Masta Clan (lyricist & performer)
2020 (57th)	My Missing Valentine	"Lost and Found"		Patty Lee (lyricist & performer); Luming Lu (lyricist & composer)
2020 (57th)	Little Big Women	"Guo Mie"	孤味	Elisa Y.H. Lin (lyricist); Blaire KO (composer); Chen Shu-fang (performer); Yu Tzu-yu (performer)
2020 (57th)	The Way We Keep Dancing	"Welcome to This City"	歡迎嚟到呢座城市	Heyo (lyricist & composer & performer); Afuc (lyricist & performer); Saville Chan (lyricist); Day Tai (composer); Lydia Lau (performer); Jan Curious (performer); KIDA Choir (performer)
2021 (58th)	I Missed You	"I Missed You"	我這個人	Eve Ai (lyricist & composer & performer)
2021 (58th)	Man in Love	"Oh Love, You Are Much Greater Than I Imagined"	愛情你比我想的閣較偉大	Ng Ki-pin (lyricist & composer); EggPlantEgg (performer)
2021 (58th)	Drifting	"Drifting"	濁水漂流	Wong Hin-yan (lyricist & composer & performer)
2021 (58th)	Till We Meet Again	"Red Scarf"	如果可以	Giddens Ko (lyricist); JerryC (composer); William Wei (composer & performer)
2021 (58th)	Coffin Homes	"One by One"	逐個逐個	Sit Chun-ning (lyricist); Jan Curious (lyricist & composer & performer)
2022 (59th)	My Best Friend's Breakfast	"What's on Your Mind"	想知道你在想什麼	Wu I-wei (lyricist); Eric Chou (lyricist & composer & performer)
2022 (59th)	And Miles to Go Before I Sleep	"Là vì em"	為了妳	Nguyen Quoc-phi (lyricist); Shih Min-chieh (composer); Lai Hsueh-ching (performer)
2022 (59th)	Gaga	"Around The Hearth"	烤火的房	Laha Mebow (lyricist); Baobu Badulu (lyricist & composer); Ali Batu (performer)
2022 (59th)	Untold Herstory	"A Place of Eternity"	永遠的所在	Olivia Tsao (lyricist & composer & performer)
2023 (60th)	Day Off	"The Usual"	同款	Wu Nien-jen (lyricist); George Chen (composer); Hung Pei-yu (performer)
2023 (60th)	Marry My Dead Body	"Untitled"	親愛的對象	Vison Chen (lyricist); David Ke (lyricist); Kay Liu (composer); Jolin Tsai (composer & performer)
2023 (60th)	Abang Adik	"A Walk to Remember"	一路以來	Aki Huang (lyricist); Katayama Ryota (lyricist & composer & performer)
2023 (60th)	Old Fox	"Fledgling"	鳥仔	Hsu Hui-ting (lyricist); Chris Hou (composer); Power Station (performer)
2023 (60th)	Snow in Midsummer	"May Threnody"	五月的人	Chong Keat Aun (lyricist); Aki Huang (composer); Wanfang (performer)
2024 (61st)	Dead Talents Society	"Dead Talents Society"	鬼才出道	Chen Hong-ren (lyricist); Joanna Wang (composer & performer)
2024 (61st)	18×2 Beyond Youthful Days	"Kiokunotabibito"	記憶的旅人	Kazutoshi Sakurai (lyricist & composer); Mr. Children (performer)
2024 (61st)	Daughter's Daughter	"Listen"	妳怎麼想	Deserts Chang (lyricist & composer & performer)
2024 (61st)	The Embers	"People From the North"	北方來的人	Chung Mong-hong (lyricist); Luming Lu (composer); TMC Children's Choir (performer)
2024 (61st)	Bel Ami	"Bel Ami"	漂亮朋友	Geng Jun (lyricist); Liang Long (composer & performer)
2025 (62nd)	Mother Bhumi	"Bhujanga"	布秧	Chong Keat Aun (lyricist); Penny Tai (composer & performer)
2025 (62nd)	Family Matters	"Blessed in the Wind"	一路順風	Crowd Lu (lyricist & composer & performer)
2025 (62nd)	Poor Taxi	"Wooden Man"	木頭人	Shang Shu (lyricist & composer & performer)
2025 (62nd)	A Foggy Tale	"A Foggy Midnight"	大濛的暗眠	Chen Yu-hsun (lyricist); Luming Lu (lyricist & composer); 9m88 (performer)
2025 (62nd)	Lovesick	"Ture Colors - Lovers"	我天生－有病版	Pan Pan An (lyricist & composer); Accusefive (performer); Zhan Huai-yun (performer); Chiang Chi (performer)

== See also ==
- Academy Award for Best Original Song
- Critics' Choice Movie Award for Best Song
- Golden Globe Award for Best Original Song
- Grammy Award for Best Song Written for Visual Media
- MAMA Award for Best OST
- David di Donatello for Best Original Song
