= 62nd Golden Horse Awards =

Award ceremony for Chinese-language films of 2024 and 2025

- Official poster "Crash"
- Date: November 22, 2025
- Site: Taipei Music Center, Taipei, Taiwan
- Preshow hosts: Pink Yang; Jake Hsu; Peng Cian-You
- Organized by: Taipei Golden Horse Film Festival Executive Committee

Highlights
- Best Feature Film: A Foggy Tale
- Best Director: Jun Li; Queerpanorama
- Best Actor: Chang Chen; Lucky Lu
- Best Actress: Fan Bingbing; Mother Bhumi
- Most awards: A Foggy Tale (4)
- Most nominations: A Foggy Tale (11)

The 62nd Golden Horse Awards (Chinese: 第62屆金馬獎) took place on November 22, 2025, at the Taipei Music Center in Taipei, Taiwan. Organized by the Taipei Golden Horse Film Festival Executive Committee, the awards honored outstanding achievements in Chinese-language cinema in 2024 and 2025. The nominees were announced on October 1, 2025. Veteran actress Chen Shu-fang was named the recipient of the Lifetime Achievement Award.

== Winners and nominees ==
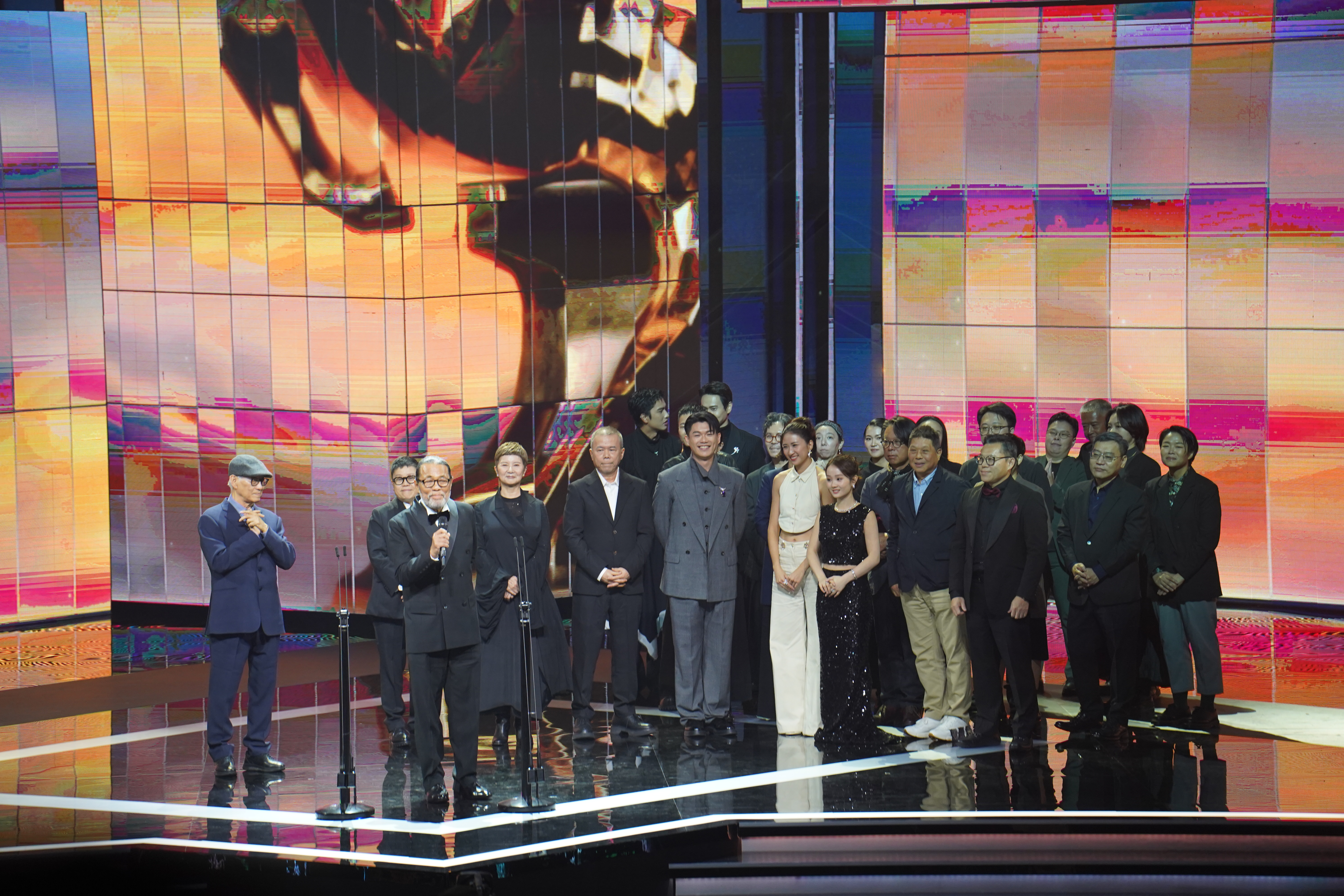
A Foggy Tale, directed by Chen Yu-hsun, Best Narrative Feature winner

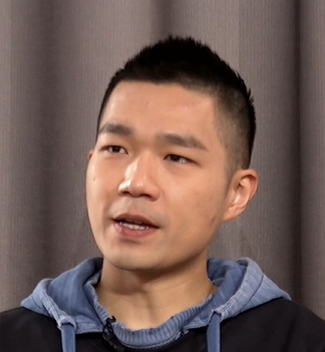
Jun Li, Best Director winner

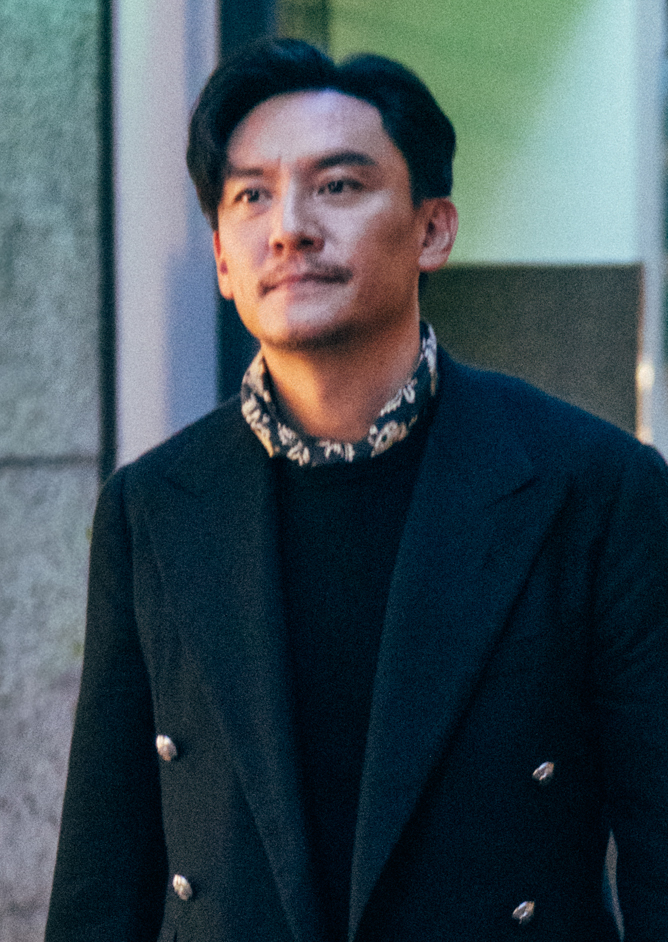
Chang Chen, Best Leading Actor winner

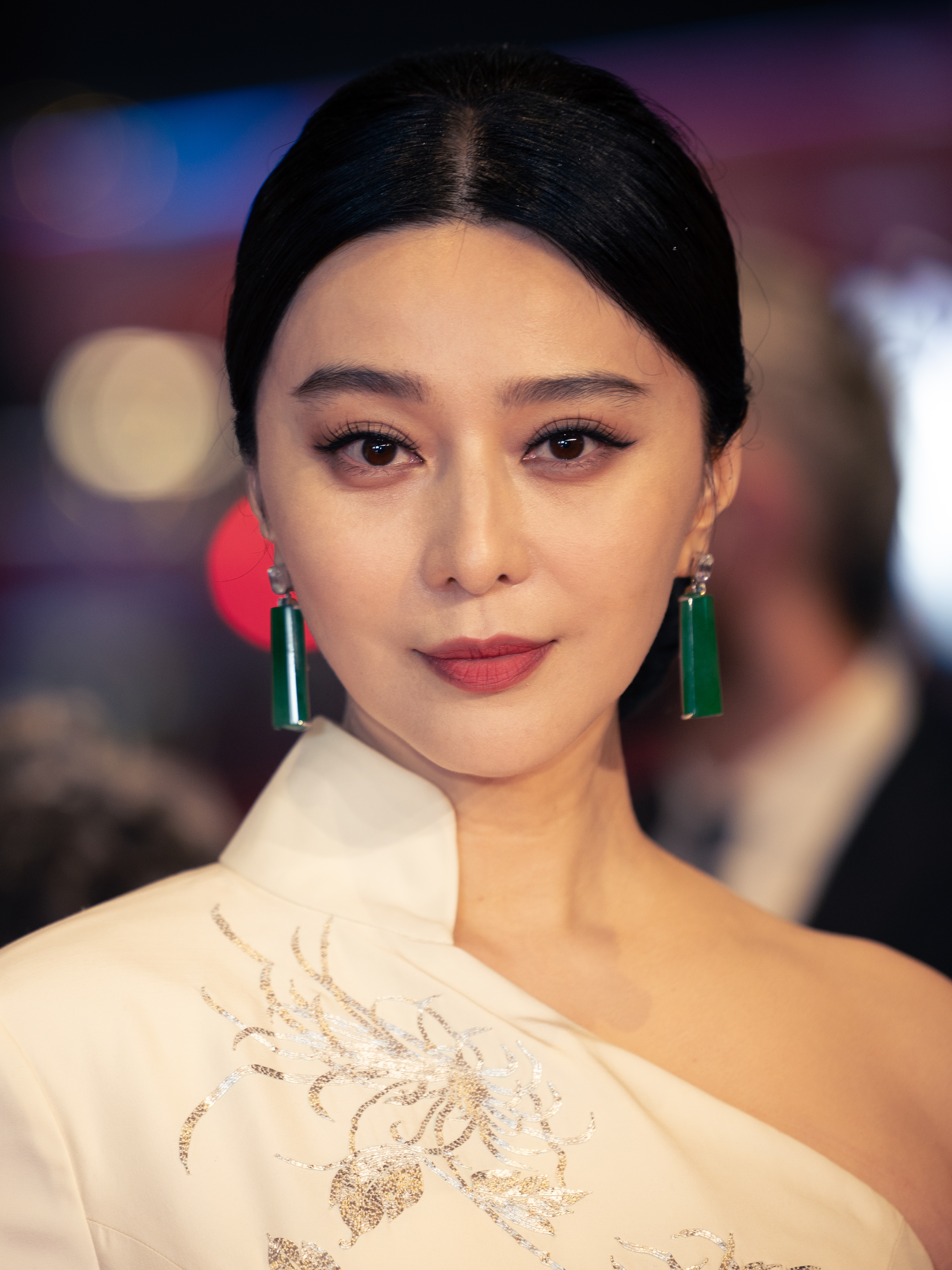
Fan Bingbing, Best Leading Actress winner

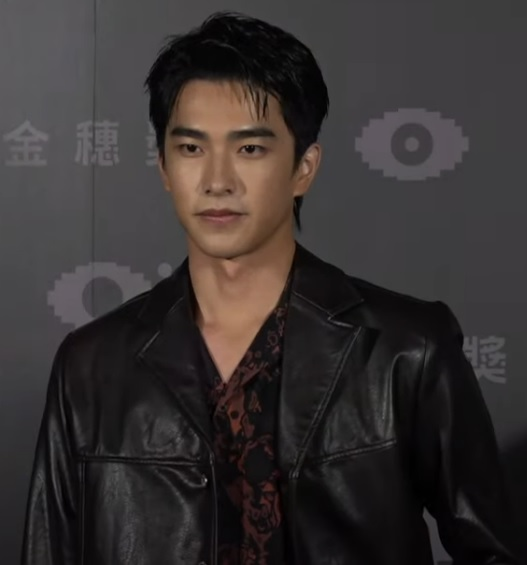
Tseng Jing-hua, Best Supporting Actor winner

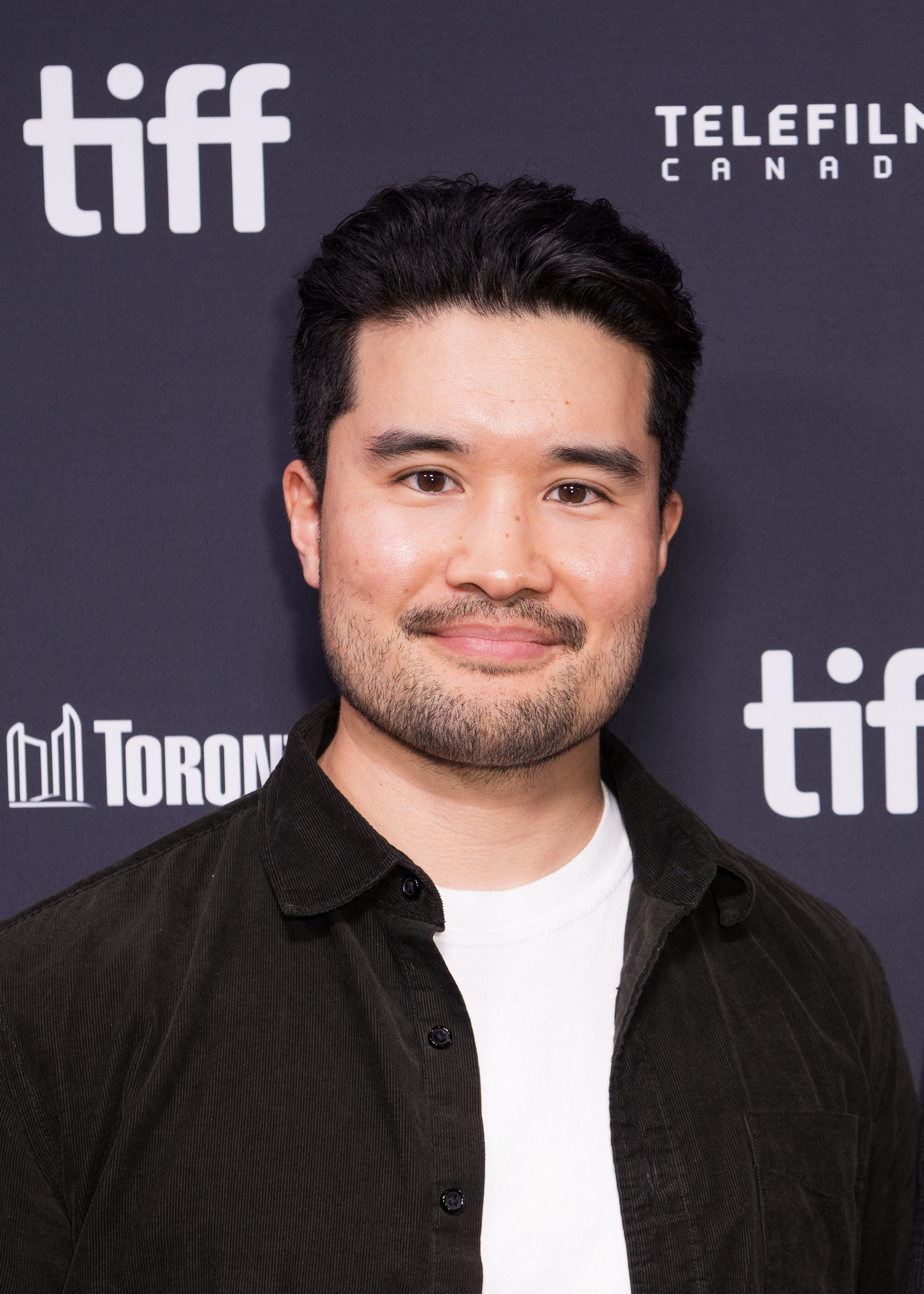
Lloyd Lee Choi, Best New Director winner

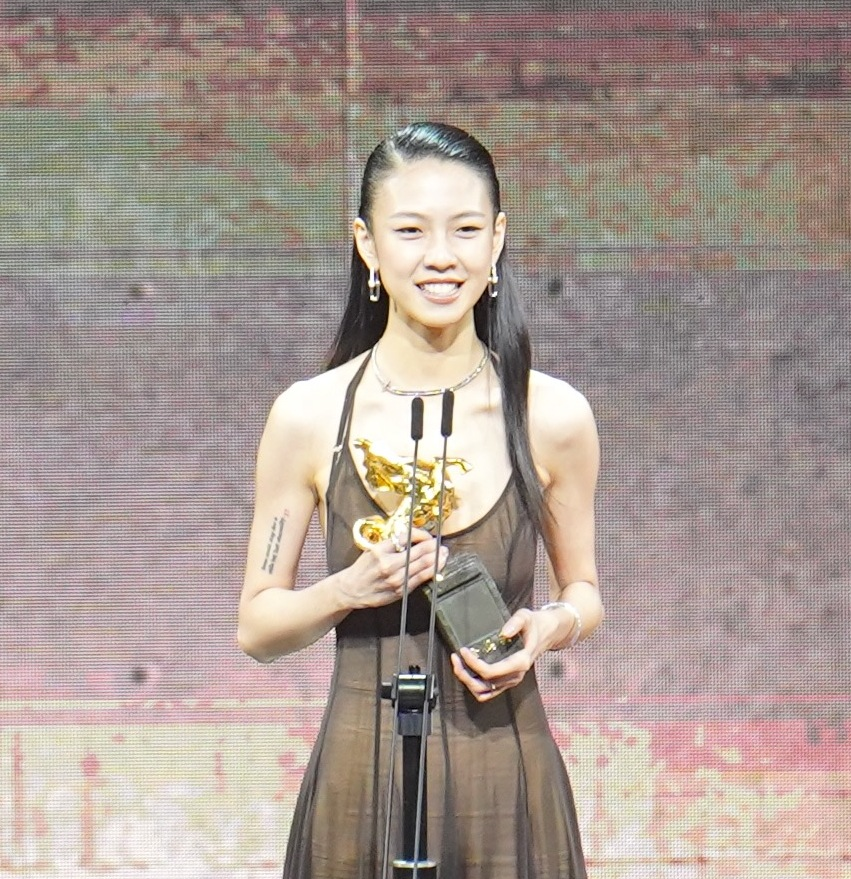
Ma Shih-yuan, Best New Performer winner

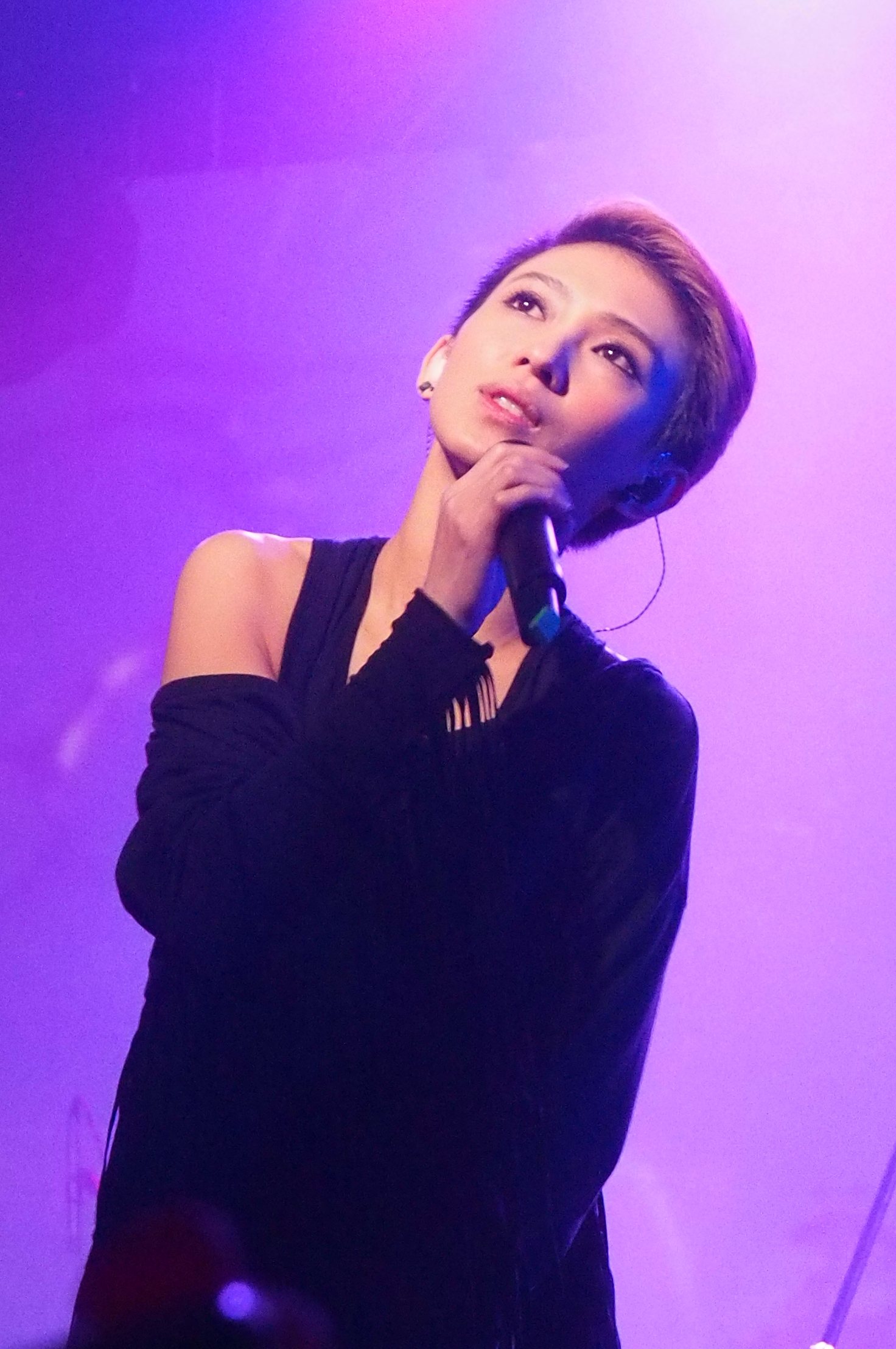
Penny Tai, Best Original Film Song co-winner

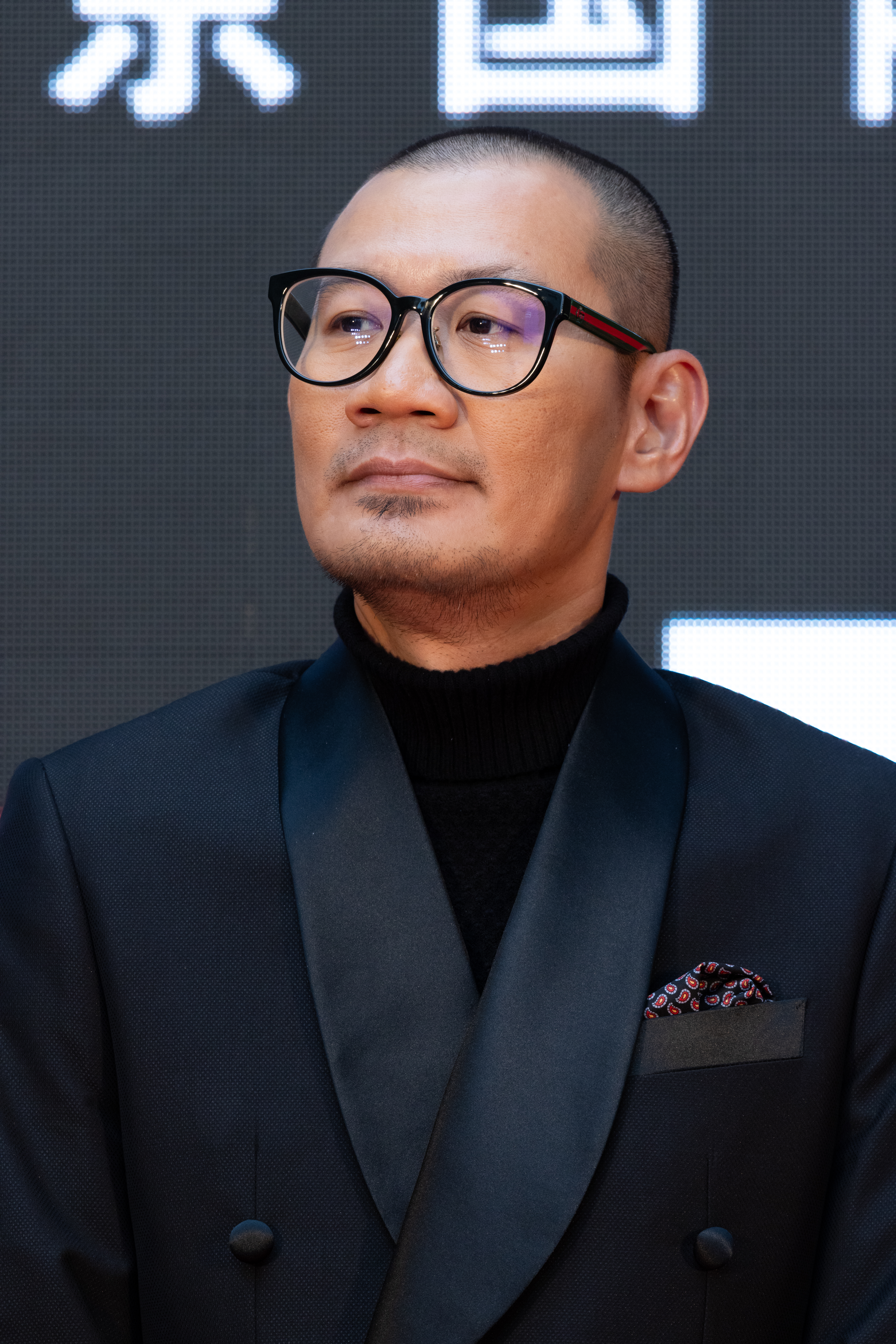
Chong Keat Aun, Best Original Film Song co-winner

Best Narrative Feature: A Foggy Tale; The Waves Will Carry Us; Left-Handed Girl; Queerpanorama; Mother Bhumi	Best Director: Jun Li – Queerpanorama; Chen Yu-hsun – A Foggy Tale; Tsao Shih-han – Before the Bright Day; Lau Kek-huat – The Waves Will Carry Us; Chong Keat Aun – Mother Bhumi
Best Leading Actor: Chang Chen – Lucky Lu; Richie Koh – A Good Child; Will Or – A Foggy Tale; Joseph Chang – Deep Quiet Room; Lan Wei-hua – Family Matters	Best Leading Actress: Fan Bingbing – Mother Bhumi; Caitlin Fang – A Foggy Tale; Rene Liu – Unexpected Courage; Ariel Lin – Deep Quiet Room; Alexia Kao – Family Matters
Best Supporting Actor: Tseng Jing-hua – Family Matters; Chin Shih-chieh – Deep Quiet Room; Brando Huang – Left-Handed Girl; Yao Chun-yao – Family Matters; Anthony Wong – Finch & Midland	Best Supporting Actress: Vera Chen – The Waves Will Carry Us; Janel Tsai – Left-Handed Girl; Nina Ye – Left-Handed Girl; Queena Huang – Family Matters; Elizabeth Tang Tao – Girlfriends
Best Original Screenplay: A Foggy Tale – Chen Yu-hsun; The Waves Will Carry Us – Lau Kek-huat; Left-Handed Girl – Shih-Ching Tsou, Sean Baker; Poor Taxi – Zhuo Kailuo; Queerpanorama – Jun Li	Best Adapted Screenplay: Family Matters – Pan Ke-yin; Another World – Polly Yeung; Deep Quiet Room – Lu Hsin-chih, Shen Ko-shang; Lucky Lu – Lloyd Lee Choi; Rosemead – Marilyn Fu
Best New Director: Lloyd Lee Choi – Lucky Lu; Shen Ko-shang – Deep Quiet Room; Shih-Ching Tsou – Left-Handed Girl; Pan Ke-yin – Family Matters; Tan Siyou – Amoeba	Best New Performer: Ma Shih-yuan – Left-Handed Girl; Rosen – Marching Boys; Jimmy Liu – BLIND LOVE; Jayden Cheung – Queerpanorama; Lin I-ting – A Dance With Rainbows
Best Film Editing: Palimpsest: The Story of a Name – Mary Stephen; A Foggy Tale – Lai Hsiu-hsiung; Left-Handed Girl – Sean Baker; Queerpanorama – Horse Stone; 1 Girl Infinite – Du Guangwei	Best Live Action Short Film: Pile On – Hu Lu; This Is NOT My Cow – Lin Chih-wen; Green Lake – Zhu Linwei; Knee-Jerk – Wang Pennram; Nervous Energy – Eve Liu
Best Documentary Feature: Palimpsest: The Story of a Name – Mary Stephen; Always – Chen Deming; Island of the Winds – Hsu Ya-ting; Daughter of Nectar – Huang Pang-chuan, Lin Chun-ni; When the Spring Rain Falls – Sylvia Feng	Best Documentary Short Film: Fragments of Herstory – Hsu Hui-ju; The Tales of the Tale – Song Cheng-ying, Hu Chin-ya; Where'd My Brother Go? – Chen Jun-wei; Beyond 93 Letters – Lin Yu-en, Liu Yen-mei; The Long Departure – Jiang Xuannian, Ji Hang
Best Animated Feature: Another World – Tommy Ng Kai-chung; A Mighty Adventure – Toe Yuen	Best Animated Short Film: Praying Mantis – Joe Hsieh; Goodbye Waves – Yang Ruihan; 91 Times Smash – Yang Yuxin; Force Times Displacement – Angel Wu; Rocked by the Wind – Huang Hsiao-shan
Best Original Film Score: Lucky Lu – Charles Humenry; Another World – Chou Li-ting, CMgroovy, Vicky Fung; Daughter of Nectar – Wang Yu-jun, Yannick Dauby; The Waves Will Carry Us – Thomas Foguenne; Mother Bhumi – Yii Kah-hoe, Chong Keat Aun	Best Original Film Song: "Bhujanga" from Mother Bhumi Lyricist: Chong Keat Aun Composer/Performer: Penny Tai; "A Foggy Midnight" from A Foggy Tale Lyricist: Chen Yu-hsun, Lu Luming Composer: Lu Luming Performer: 9m88; "Wooden Man" from Poor Taxi Lyricist/Composer/Performer: Shang Shu; "Blessed in the Wind" from Family Matters Lyricist/Composer/Performer: Crowd Lu; "Ture Colors - Lovers" from Lovesick Lyricist/Composer: Pan Yun-an Performer: Accusefive, Zhan Huai-yun, Chiang Chi
Best Cinematography: Mother Bhumi – Leung Ming Kai; Deep Quiet Room – Chen Ta-pu; Lucky Lu – Norm Li; Left-Handed Girl – Chen Ko-chin, Kao Tzu-hao; 96 Minutes – Jimmy Wong	Best Sound Effects: A Mighty Adventure – R.T Kao, Dave Cheung, Sammi Lin; A Foggy Tale – Book Chien, Tang Hsiang-chu; 96 Minutes – Chen Wei-liang, Narubett Peamyai, Elwin T.; Mother Bhumi – Tu Duu-chih, Fiona Chang, Chen Kuan-ting; Road to Vendetta – Lai Chi-hung
Best Makeup & Costume Design: A Foggy Tale – Hsu Li-wen; A Good Child – Shahreens, Dollei Seah; Before the Bright Day – Zheng Yu-pei; Mother Bhumi – Elaine Ng, Gary Chan, Kate Kua, Daphne Wong; Road to Vendetta – Giselle Fok Hio-tong, Kato Miyuki	Best Art Direction: A Foggy Tale – Wang Chih-cheng, You Li-wun; Deep Quiet Room – Penny Tsai Pei-ling; Before the Bright Day – Chang Yi-feng, Yuan Xiao-fan; 96 Minutes – Simon So Kwok-ho; Road to Vendetta – Yan Sin-yeung, Yoshimoto Yukihito
Best Visual Effects: 96 Minutes – Evan Wen, Lin Wei-hung, Hu Hong-yu, Fu Wan-ting; A Mighty Adventure – Terence Neoh, Kento Wong Kee-yen, Jothan Chin Vun-zed, Chan Chooi Kun; A Foggy Tale – Tomi Kuo, Hulk Chen; Road to Vendetta – Chan Tze-him	Best Action Choreography: A Dance With Rainbows – Teddy Ray Huang, Chen Chia-ling; Marching Boys – Hung Shih-hao, Damien Fan; 96 Minutes – Hung Shih-hao; Good Game – Ken Law; Road to Vendetta – Koichi Sakamoto

== Honorary awards ==
Lifetime Achievement Award: Chen Shu-fang	Outstanding Taiwanese Filmmaker of the Year: Joy Chung

== Out-of-competition awards ==
Audience Choice Award: A Foggy Tale	Taiwan Film Critics Society Award: Amoeba – Tan Siyou
FIPRESCI Prize: Amoeba; Unexpected Courage; Deep Quiet Room; Lucky Lu; Left-Handed Girl; Poor Taxi; Family Matters; A Dance With Rainbows; Road to Vendetta; Finch & Midland; Rosemead; 1 Girl Infinite	NETPAC Award: Mag Mag; The Waves Will Carry Us; Poor Taxi; A Dance With Rainbows; Amoeba; Ky Nam Inn; The Fin; Becoming Human; On Your Lap; The Old Man and His Car

== Jury ==
- Liao Ching-sung, Taiwanese film editor and executive producer – Jury President
- Karena Lam, Taiwanese Canadian actress
- Chin Ting-chang, Taiwanese cinematographer
- David Tang, film producer
- Huang Hsin-yao, Taiwanese film director and screenwriter
- Owen Wang, film composer and musical producer
- Ho Miu-ki, Hong Kong film director and screenwriter
- Wu Jo-yun, production designer
- Li Nien-hsiu, director, screenwriter and editor
- Tom Lin Shu-yu, Taiwanese film director, screenwriter and producer
- Kevin Ko, Taiwanese director, screenwriter and editor
- Zhang Xu Zhan, animation director and visual artist
- Chiang Wei-liang, director, screenwriter and cinematographer
- Huang Hsiu-yi, documentary director
- Ryan Cheng, film critic and programme director for Kaohsiung Film Festival
