= A Foggy Tale =

2025 film by Chen Yu-hsun

- Theatrical release poster
- Chinese: 大濛
- Directed by: Chen Yu-hsun
- Written by: Chen Yu-hsun
- Produced by: Yeh Ju-feng; Lee Lieh
- Starring: Caitlin Fang; Will Or; 9m88
- Cinematography: Chen Chi-wen
- Edited by: Lai Hsiu-hsiung
- Music by: Luming Lu
- Production companies: TAICCA; MandarinVision; Thunder Entertainment; Arrow Cinematic Group; Millet Production
- Release date: November 13, 2025 (Golden Horse)
- Running time: 134 minutes
- Country: Taiwan
- Language: Taiwanese Hokkien

A Foggy Tale (Chinese: 大濛) is a 2025 Taiwanese drama film directed by Chen Yu-hsun set during the period of White Terror when Taiwan was ruled under the Kuomintang's era of martial law. The film was named Best Narrative Feature at the 62nd Golden Horse awards.

It was selected as the Taiwanese entry for Best International Feature Film at the 99th Academy Awards.

== Plot ==
The film follows a young Taiwanese girl from Chiayi who travels north to retrieve the remains of her brother, who had been executed by the Kuomintang. She develops a friendship with a local soldier and rickshaw driver.

It is set during the 1950s, in an era when the Kuomintang government violently persecuted perceived political dissidents to prevent infiltration by the Chinese Communist Party.

The movie's dialogue is mostly in Taiwanese Hokkien.

== Cast ==
The film stars Caitlin Fang, Will Or, and Joanne Tang (also known by stage name 9m88).

Lee Lieh and Yeh Jufeng served as veteran producers of the film.

- Caitlin Fang – N̂g Tshiu-gua̍t / Huang Chiu-Yue (黃秋月) aka A-Gua̍t / A-Yue (阿月)
- Will Or – Ziu Gung-dou / Chao Kung-Tao (趙公道)
- 9m88 (Joanne Tang) – Khu Siù-hâ / Chiu Hsiu-Hsia (邱秀霞) aka A-Hâ / A-Hsia (阿霞)
- Jing-Hua Tseng – N̂g Io̍k-hûn / Huang Yu-Yun (黃育雲)
- Chen Yi-wen – Fan Chun (范春)
- Mei-hsiu Lin (林美秀) – Aunt A-Tshiok / A-Chueh(阿雀姨)
- Liu Kuan-ting – Ko Kim-tsiong / Kao Chin-chung (高金鐘)
- Vivian Sung – Liu Nien-Yun (劉念雲)
- Li-li Pan (潘麗麗) – Huang Chiu-Yue (adult)
- Emerson Tsai – Lí Futao (李二雄)
- Bamboo Chen – A-Gua̍t's uncle
- Kingone Wang
- Hu Jhih-ciang

== Release ==
The film premiered at the 2025 Golden Horse Film Festival as the opening film in Chiayi.

== Reception ==
A Foggy Tale received 11 nominations for the 62nd Golden Horse Awards, the most of any film. It eventually won a total of four: Best Narrative Film, Best Original Screenplay, Best Art Direction and Best Makeup & Costume Design.

=== Accolades ===
Award	Date of ceremony	Category	Recipient(s)	Result	Ref.
Golden Horse Awards	November 22, 2025	Best Narrative Feature	A Foggy Tale	Won	
Golden Horse Awards	November 22, 2025	Best Leading Actor	Will Or	Nominated	
Golden Horse Awards	November 22, 2025	Best Leading Actress	Caitlin Fang	Nominated	
Golden Horse Awards	November 22, 2025	Best Director	Chen Yu-hsun	Nominated	
Golden Horse Awards	November 22, 2025	Best Original Screenplay	Chen Yu-hsun	Won	
Golden Horse Awards	November 22, 2025	Best Original Film Song	"A Foggy Midnight"	Nominated	
Golden Horse Awards	November 22, 2025	Best Sound Effects	Book Chien, Tang Hsiang-chu	Nominated	
Golden Horse Awards	November 22, 2025	Best Film Editing	Lai Hsiu-hsiung	Nominated	
Golden Horse Awards	November 22, 2025	Best Makeup & Costume Design	Hsu Li-wen	Won	
Golden Horse Awards	November 22, 2025	Best Art Direction	Wang Chih-cheng, You Li-wun	Won	
Golden Horse Awards	November 22, 2025	Best Visual Effects	Tomi Kuo, Hulk Chen	Nominated	

== See also ==
- List of submissions to the 99th Academy Awards for Best International Feature Film
- List of Taiwanese submissions for the Academy Award for Best International Feature Film
