= Mother Bhumi =

2025 film by Chong Keat Aun

- Film poster
- Traditional Chinese: 地母
- Hanyu Pinyin: Dì Mǔ
- Directed by: Chong Keat Aun
- Written by: Chong Keat Aun
- Produced by: Wong Kew Soon; Stefano Centini; Zoey Teng
- Starring: Fan Bingbing; Natalie Hsu; Bai Run-yin; Pearlly Chua
- Cinematography: Leung Ming Kai
- Edited by: Erik Moh
- Music by: Yii Kah Hoe; Chong Keat Aun
- Production companies: SunStrong Entertainment: Sure Honest Holdings; AMTD Pictures Production; Janji Pictures; Volos Films; Southern Islet Pictures
- Distributed by: Rediance
- Release date: October 27, 2025 (Tokyo)
- Running time: 129 minutes
- Countries: Malaysia; Hong Kong; Italy; Saudi Arabia
- Languages: Mandarin; Malay; Thai

Mother Bhumi (Chinese: 地母) is a 2025 drama film written and directed by Chong Keat Aun, starring Fan Bingbing, Natalie Hsu, Bai Run-yin and Pearlly Chua. The film has been selected for the main competition section of the 38th Tokyo International Film Festival, where it had its world premiere on 27 October 2025. The film received eight nominations at the 62nd Golden Horse Awards and won three, including Best Cinematography, Best Original Film Song, and Best Leading Actress for Fan.

== Premise ==
In late-1990s Malaysia, amid political unrest, Hong Im, a widowed farmer and ritual healer, struggles to protect her family in a multi-ethnic rice-farming village. By day, she resists land seizures; by night, she heals and exorcises. As colonial-era conflicts resurface, strange events unfold: spirits return, black magic stirs, and a monk leads a buffalo. The legacy of empire haunts the land, the living, and the dead of Bujang Valley.

== Cast ==
- Fan Bingbing as Hong Im
- Natalie Hsu as Boon
- Bai Run-yin as Koon
- Pearlly Chua as Har
- Pauline Tan as Sim
- Loh Lai Kan as Eng
- Rithaudin Abdul Kadir as Tam
- Alvin Wong as Dato’ Tan
- Tan Mei Ling as Datin

== Production ==
Mother Bhumi project was selected for the Work in Production (WIP) section of the 2025 Hong Kong Asia Film Financing Forum (HAF23). A Malaysian–Italian–Hong Kong co-production, the film is executive produced by Datuk Wira Jment Lim, Victor Ren and Calvin Choi.

== Accolades ==
- 38th Tokyo International Film Festival - Main Competition
- 62nd Golden Horse Awards - Winner of 3 awards
- 28th Udine Far East Film Festival - Main Competition
- 30th Bucheon International Fantastic Film Festival - Signature Section
- Bangkok International Film Festival 2026 - Asean Film Competition
- 14th Singapore Chinese Film Festival - Chinese Panorama
- 4th Da Nang Asian Film Festival - Panorama of Asian Cinema

Award	Date of ceremony	Category	Recipient(s)	Result	Ref.
Tokyo International Film Festival	5 November 2025	Tokyo Grand Prix	Mother Bhumi	Nominated	
Golden Horse Awards	22 November 2025	Best Narrative Feature	Mother Bhumi	Nominated	
Golden Horse Awards	22 November 2025	Best Director	Chong Keat Aun	Nominated	
Golden Horse Awards	22 November 2025	Best Leading Actress	Fan Bingbing	Won	
Golden Horse Awards	22 November 2025	Best Original Film Score	Yii Kah-hoe, Chong Keat Aun	Nominated	
Golden Horse Awards	22 November 2025	Best Original Film Song	"Bhujanga" (Chong Keat Aun, Penny Tai)	Won	
Golden Horse Awards	22 November 2025	Best Cinematography	Leung Ming Kai	Won	
Golden Horse Awards	22 November 2025	Best Sound Effects	Tu Duu-chih, Fiona Chang, Chen Kuan-ting	Nominated	
Golden Horse Awards	22 November 2025	Best Makeup & Costume Design	Elaine Ng, Gary Chan, Kate Kua, Daphne Wong	Nominated	
Hong Kong Film Critics Society Awards	25 January 2026	Best Actress	Fan Bingbing	Nominated	
Bangkok International Film Festival	27 September 2026	Best Performance in a Leading Role	Fan Bingbing	Won	
