= 96 Minutes =

96 Minutes may refer to:

- 96 Minutes (2011 film), American crime thriller film
- 96 Minutes (2025 film), Taiwanese disaster action thriller film
