= Golden Horse Award for Best Documentary Short Film =

Taiwanese film award

- Awarded for: Best Documentary Short Film
- Country: Taiwan
- Presented by: Taipei Golden Horse Film Festival Executive Committee
- First award: 2021
- Currently held by: Fragments of Herstory by Hsu Hui-ju (2025)
- Website: goldenhorse.org.tw

The Golden Horse Award for Best Documentary Short Film (Chinese: 金馬獎最佳紀錄短片) is presented annually at Taiwan's Golden Horse Film Awards.

== Winners and nominees ==
indicates the winner

Year	Recipient(s)	Short film	Original title	Ref.
2021 (58th)	LIN Yu-en	In Their Teens	度日	
2021 (58th)	CHIANG Wei-liang	Nothing in the Cries of Cicadas	一抔黃土	
2021 (58th)	HSU Che-chia	The Catch	捕鰻的人	
2021 (58th)	Tsai Ming-liang	The Night	良夜不能留	
2021 (58th)	CHEN Wei-chieh	Ning	寍	
2022 (59th)	Huang Shuli	Will You Look at Me	当我望向你的时候	
2022 (59th)	Musquiqui Chihying	The Lighting	打光	
2022 (59th)	LAU Kek-huat	Between the Stars and Waves	一邊星星 一邊海浪	
2022 (59th)	CHIANG Wei-liang	Kaohsiung City, Yancheng District, Fubei Rd., No. 31	庭中有奇樹	
2022 (59th)	Anson MAK	The Black Wall	黑牆	
2023 (60th)	Badlands Film Group	The Memo	備忘錄	
2023 (60th)	ZHU Yunyi	Of Dreams in the Dream of Another Mirror	另一面鏡子裡的夢中之夢	
2023 (60th)	ZHANG Hong-jie	Hearing from the Dolphin	鯨之聲	
2023 (60th)	LIU Ren-feng	Eviction and Beyond	乙方及其後	
2023 (60th)	YUEN Nanhsi	Girl of Wind	吹夢無蹤	
2024 (61st)	CHAN Cheuk-sze, Kathy WONG	Colour Ideology Sampling.mov	顏色擷取樣本.mov	
2024 (61st)	XUE Mengzhu	Before Then	哦瑪	
2024 (61st)	CHEN Chiao-wei	Wild Road	野生之路	
2024 (61st)	Green Bean	Letters from the Imprisoned: Chow Hang Tung	獄中信－鄒幸彤	
2024 (61st)	Rex REN	Something About Us	慧童	
2025 (62nd)	HSU Hui-ju	Fragments of Herstory	她的碎片	
2025 (62nd)	SONG Cheng-ying, HU Chin-ya	The Tales of the Tale	侯硐奇譚	
2025 (62nd)	CHEN Jun-wei	Where'd My Brother Go?	哥哥死後去了哪裡	
2025 (62nd)	LIN Yu-en, LIU Yen-mei	Beyond 93 Letters	第九十三封信之後	
2025 (62nd)	JIANG Xuannian, JI Hang	The Long Departure	孩子	

== See also ==
- Academy Award for Best Documentary Short Film
- César Award for Best Documentary Short Film
- Goya Award for Best Documentary Short Film
