= Chen Yu-hsun =

Taiwanese commercial director and filmmaker

- Born: June 21, 1962 (age 64); Taiwan
- Occupation: Film director
- Known for: Tropical Fish (1994); Zone Pro Site (2013); My Missing Valentine (2020)

Chen Yu-hsun (born June 21, 1962) is a Taiwanese commercial director and filmmaker born in Taipei, Taiwan. He is the first director to win the three major film awards in Taiwan, including the Golden Horse Film Festival and Awards, the Taipei Film Awards, and the Taiwan Film Critics Society Awards, for the same film, My Missing Valentine (2020). He is widely known for his "offbeat, distinctly Taiwanese sense of humor that permeates his works".

== Biography ==
After spending his fourth year at the so-called "Junior Fourth Class" (a cram school for students retaking high school after their junior year), Chen Yu-Hsun successfully entered the Cheng Kung High School after a grade retention. After failing the university entrance exam, he had no choice but to enlist in the military. Retaking the university entrance exam for the second time at the age of 22, he finally passed and enrolled in the Department of Educational Media and Library Sciences, now renamed as the Department of Information and Library Science, at the Tamkang University. Chen graduated from the Tamkang University in 1989.

Chen always has a passion for painting and heavy metal music. It was not until his senior year that he got hold of the opportunity to work as a studio assistant in the Department of Mass Communication at the university, which led him to an internship with director Wang Shaudi. Chen Yu-Hsun found his true passion at the internship. That is, telling stories through visual images. Chen started his first job as a script supervisor for director Tsai Ming-Liang's comedy drama, Happy Motor Shop (1989).

Chen shot his first feature film, Tropical Fish, in 1994, after years of working with television series. The film was commercially successful and critically acclaimed, making Tropical Fish one of the most remarkable comedies in the history of Taiwan cinema.

Due to his dissatisfaction with the filmmaking environment and his box office failures in Taiwan, Chen had once left the film industry for 13 years. During that time, he worked on many humorous commercial advertisement projects that became well known among television audiences.

His film The Village of No Return was released in 2017. Chinese netizens campaigned to boycott the film, stating that Chen was sympathetic towards the Sunflower Movement.

In 2020, his film, My Missing Valentine, won a total of five awards at the 57th Golden Horse Film Festival and Awards, including Best Narrative Feature, Best Director, Best Original Screenplay, Best Visual Effects, and Best Film Editing.

== Television series ==
- 1989: Happy Motor Shop (快樂車行)
- 1989: Jia Jia Fu (佳家福)
- 1991: A Space for the Little People—Are We Angels? (小市民的天空—我們算不算是天使)
- 1992: Hen and Duckling (母雞帶小鴨)
- 1994: Ngasal Maku—My Home (納桑嘛谷－我的家)
- 2016: Close Your Eyes Before It's Dark (植劇場－天黑請閉眼)

== Filmography ==
- 1994: Tropical Fish, starring Wen Ying and Apipo
  - 1995: Winner of the Blue Leopard Prize and International Film Critics Award at the Locarno International Film Festival in Switzerland; the Best Original Screenplay Award at the Golden Horse Film Festival and Awards; and the 21st Century Top 100 Youth Awards from the China Times.
  - 1996: Winner of the Golden Panda Award for Best Film at the Montbéliard Film Festival in France.
- 1997: Love Gogo, starring Chen Ching-Hsin, Nana Tang, Jane Liao, Mickey Huang, and Eli Shih
  - Winner of the Outstanding Screenplay Award from the Government Information Office of Taiwan
  - Winner of the Best Supporting Actor and Best Supporting Actress at the Golden Horse Film Festival and Awards
- 2010: "Another Juliet" from Juliets, starring Vincent Liang and Kang Kang
- 2011: "Hippocamp Hair Salon" from 10+10 Ten Plus Ten, starring Lee Lieh, Ko I-chen, and Lawrence Ko
  - 2011: Opening film at the 2011 Golden Horse Film Festival
  - 2012: Nominated for the Panorama section at the 2012 Berlin International Film Festival
- 2013: Zone Pro Site, starring Tony Yang, Lin Mei-Hsiu, and Kimi Hsia
- 2017: The Village of No Return, starring Shu Qi, Joseph Chang, and Eric Tsang
- 2020: My Missing Valentine, starring Liu Kuan-ting and Patty Lee
  - Winner of Best Narrative Feature, Best Director, Best Original Screenplay, Best Visual Effects, and Best Film Editing at the Golden Horse Film Festival and Awards
  - Selected for the Open Cinema section at the Busan International Film Festival
  - 2021: Winner of Best Director at the 2021 Taiwan Film Critics Society Awards
  - 2021: Winner of Best Director at the 23rd Taipei Film Awards
- 2025: A Foggy Tale
  - 2026: Winner of the Golden Horse Award for Best Narrative Feature

== Screenwriting ==
- 2015: Co-wrote, with director Lee Chung, the screenplay for The Laundryman

== Performance for Film ==
- 2000: Pure Accidents
- 2006: Catch
- 2011: 10+10 Ten Plus Ten
- 2011: Starry Starry Night
- 2012: Love
- 2013: Soul
- 2016: Godspeed

== Select commercial ==
- KG Telecom
- HeySong Corporation
- Quaker Oats Company
- Wei Lih Food Industrial Co., Ltd.
- King To Nin Jiom Pei Pa Koa
- Paolyta
- The 2010 Golden Horse Film Festival and Awards

== Music video ==
Song	Artist	Album	Date of Release
Nobody Else in my Heart	Mayday	Viva Love	April 11, 2012
Fool	Mayday	Viva Love	April 26, 2012
You're Not Truly Happy	Mayday	Poetry of the Day After	2008 in KTV January 18, 2013
Breakthrough Day	Mayday	Poetry of the Day After	2008 in KTV January 18, 2013
For Somethings, If You Don't Do It Now, You'll Never Do	Mayday	Second Round	December 12, 2013

== Publication ==
- Flying Off the Rails: An Amusing Comic Memoir of Filming in Mainland China《飛天脫線記：大陸拍片漫畫記趣》, published by the Chinese Television System Culture Enterprise Corporation in 1996 (ISBN 957-572-089-X)

== Social participation and public speech ==
- In June 2012, Chen Yu-Hsun, along with Ko I-Chen, Wu Yii-feng, Leon Dai, Luo Yijun, and Ya Ai, and 60 other artists and cultural workers, initiated a 30-second flash mob anti-nuclear protest. Gathered in a ren (人/human)-shaped formation on Ketagalan Boulevard in front of the Presidential Office Building in Taipei, Taiwan, they chanted the slogan, "I am a human, I am against nuclear power."
- In 2013, Chen Yu-Hsun criticized President Ma Ying-jeou on Facebook regarding the Cross-Strait Service Trade Agreement. He questioned why the president did not inform the people and the legislature when signing the agreement, but instead choose to announce to world other irrelevant personal details.
- During the 2014 Sunflower Movement, Chen Yu-Hsun personally visited the Legislative Yuan to show support for the protesting students, teasing that, "I heard that suncakes were delivered here, so I come to have some." He also posted on Facebook, "Our grandfathers' revolution allows our fathers to have the right to vote, but if the fathers vote recklessly, the sons have to start a revolution." He also stated in his Facebook post that, "I don't know about the other people, but what I want is to defend democracy. Politicians must respect their people. No matter how important the Service Trade Agreement could be, it will never be as important as our democracy."
- On April 10, 2014, when the Sunflower Movement withdrew from the Legislative Yuan, Chen Yu-Hsun again posted a photo on Facebook with the caption, "The world may not become better, but you will." He thanked the students, saying, "When you can see things clearly, you can appreciate them better. When you can appreciate the world better, you can then gain at lot from it. Colorful, vibrant, warm, humorous, and infinitely creative. Thanks to this student-led civic movement, which has sparked new thinking in Taiwan. We will become better."
- On January 5, 2017, Chen Yu-Hsun released a statement emphasizing that he had never supported Taiwan independence movement. He stated, "I have never had the belief in Taiwan's independence, nor do I support it or consider myself a pro-independence person." He emphasized that standing against the Service Trade Agreement does not equal being pro-independence. He also expressed the hope for open-mindedness, setting aside biases, and enhancing mutual trust between both sides of the Taiwan Strait. He also expressed the desire for smoother exchanges in the film and television industries between Taiwan and China.
