= Golden Horse Award for Outstanding Taiwanese Filmmaker of the Year =

Taiwanese film award

- Awarded for: Outstanding Taiwanese Filmmaker of the Year
- Location: Taiwan
- Presented by: Taipei Golden Horse Film Festival Executive Committee
- First award: 1997
- Currently held by: Joy Chung (2025)
- Website: www.goldenhorse.org.tw

The Golden Horse Award for Outstanding Taiwanese Filmmaker of the Year (Chinese: 金馬獎年度台灣傑出電影工作者) is an award presented annually at the Golden Horse Awards by the Taipei Golden Horse Film Festival Executive Committee. The latest ceremony was held in 2023, with Lin Shih-ken receiving the honor.
