= Golden Horse Award for Best Film Editing =

Taiwanese film award

- Awarded for: Best Film Editing
- Country: Taiwan
- Presented by: Taipei Golden Horse Film Festival Executive Committee
- First award: 1962
- Currently held by: Mary Stephen for Palimpsest: The Story of a Name (2025)
- Website: goldenhorse.org.tw

The Golden Horse Award for Best Film Editing (Chinese: 金馬獎最佳剪輯) is presented annually at Taiwan's Golden Horse Film Awards.

== Winners and nominees ==
=== 2010s ===
Year	Editor(s)	Film	Original Title
2010 (47th)
2010 (47th)	Robin Weng, Zeng Jian and Florence Bresson	Spring Fever	春風沉醉的夜晚
2011 (48th)
2011 (48th)	Chen Hsiao-tung	The Man behind the Book	尋找背海的人
2012 (49th)
2012 (49th)	Yang Hongyu	Beijing Blues	神探亨特張
2013 (50th)
2013 (50th)	Matthieu Laclau and Lin Xudong	A Touch of Sin	天註定
2013 (50th)	Azrael Chung	Unbeatable	激戰
2013 (50th)	David Richardson and Allen Leung Chin-lun	Drug War	毒戰
2013 (50th)	William Chang, Benjamin Courtines and Poon Hung-yiu	The Grandmaster	一代宗師
2013 (50th)	Xiao Yang	American Dreams in China	海闊天空
2014 (51st)
2014 (51st)	Kong Jinglei and Jolin Zhu	Blind Massage	推拿
2014 (51st)	Yang Hongyu	Black Coal, Thin Ice	白日焰火
2014 (51st)	Du Yuan	No Man's Land	無人區
2014 (51st)	Yau Chi-wai	The White Storm	掃毒
2014 (51st)	Zhu Liyun and Tu Yiran	Brotherhood of Blades	綉春刀
2015 (52nd)
2015 (52nd)	Chang Tso-chi	Thanatos, Drunk	醉.生夢死
2015 (52nd)	Liao Ching-sung	The Assassin	刺客聶隱娘
2015 (52nd)	Zhong Renbo	The Verse of Us	我的詩篇
2015 (52nd)	Chen Po-wen	Murmur of the Hearts	念念
2015 (52nd)	Ding Sheng	Saving Mr. Wu	解救吾先生
2016 (53rd)
2016 (53rd)	Allen Leung and David Richardson	Trivisa	樹大招風
2016 (53rd)	Lin Wan-yu	Small Talk	日常對話
2016 (53rd)	Kao Ming-sheng and Wang Ching-chiao	The Tag-Along	紅衣小女孩
2016 (53rd)	Cheung Ka-fai	Ip Man 3	葉問3
2016 (53rd)	Derek Hui, Li Dianshi, Zhou Xiaolin and Tan Xiang-yuan	Soul Mate	七月與安生

=== 2020s ===
Year	Editor(s)	Film	Original title	Ref.
2020 (57th)	Lai Hsiu-hsiung	My Missing Valentine	消失的情人節	
2020 (57th)	Lai Hsiu-hsiung	Classmates Minus	同學麥娜絲	
2020 (57th)	Mary Stephen, Adam Wong Sau-ping	The Way We Keep Dancing	狂舞派3	
2020 (57th)	Milk Su, Chen Chun-hung	The Silent Forest	無聲	
2020 (57th)	William Chang, Alan Lo	Hand Rolled Cigarette	手捲煙	
2021 (58th)	Shieh Meng-ju	The Soul	緝魂	
2021 (58th)	Lai Hsiu-hsiung	The Falls	瀑布	
2021 (58th)	Heiward Mak, Jun Li	Drifting	濁水漂流	
2021 (58th)	L2, Rex Ren	May You Stay Forever Young	少年	
2021 (58th)	Lee Huey, Ho Wi-ding	Terrorizers	青春弒戀	
2022 (59th)	Kevin Ko	Incantation	咒	
2022 (59th)	Huang Yi-ling	A Holy Family	神人之家	
2022 (59th)	David Richardson	Limbo	智齒	
2022 (59th)	Shieh Meng-ju, Lee Huey	Bad Education	黑的教育	
2022 (59th)	Chan Ching-lin, Ian Lin, Chen Pei-ying	Coo-Coo 043	一家子兒咕咕叫	
2023 (60th)	Liao Ching-sung, Ryuji Otsuka	Stonewalling	石門	
2023 (60th)	Chen Chun-hung	Marry My Dead Body	關於我和鬼變成家人的那件事	
2023 (60th)	Keith Chan Hiu-chun, Nick Cheuk	Time Still Turns the Pages	年少日記	
2023 (60th)	Shieh Meng-ju	Eye of the Storm	疫起	
2023 (60th)	Wong Ching-po	The Pig, the Snake and the Pigeon	周處除三害	
2024 (61st)	Chen Ho-ping	Bel Ami	漂亮朋友	
2024 (61st)	Anna Magdalena Schlenker	XiXi	曦曦	
2024 (61st)	William Chang, Lai Kwun-tung	All Shall Be Well	從今以後	
2024 (61st)	Tom Lin Hsin-ming	Yen and Ai-Lee	小雁與吳愛麗	
2024 (61st)	Tian Jiaming	An Unfinished Film	一部未完成的電影	
2025 (62nd)	Mary Stephen	Palimpsest: The Story of a Name	隱蹟之書：重寫自我	
2025 (62nd)	Lai Hsiu-hsiung	A Foggy Tale	大濛	
2025 (62nd)	Sean Baker	Left-Handed Girl	左撇子女孩	
2025 (62nd)	Horse Stone	Queerpanorama	眾生相	
2025 (62nd)	Du Guangwei	1 Girl Infinite	不可能女孩	

== See also ==
- Academy Award for Best Film Editing
- BAFTA Award for Best Editing
- Blue Dragon Film Award for Best Editing
- César Award for Best Editing
- Goya Award for Best Editing
- Hong Kong Film Award for Best Editing
