= Will Or =

Hong Kong actor (born 1992)

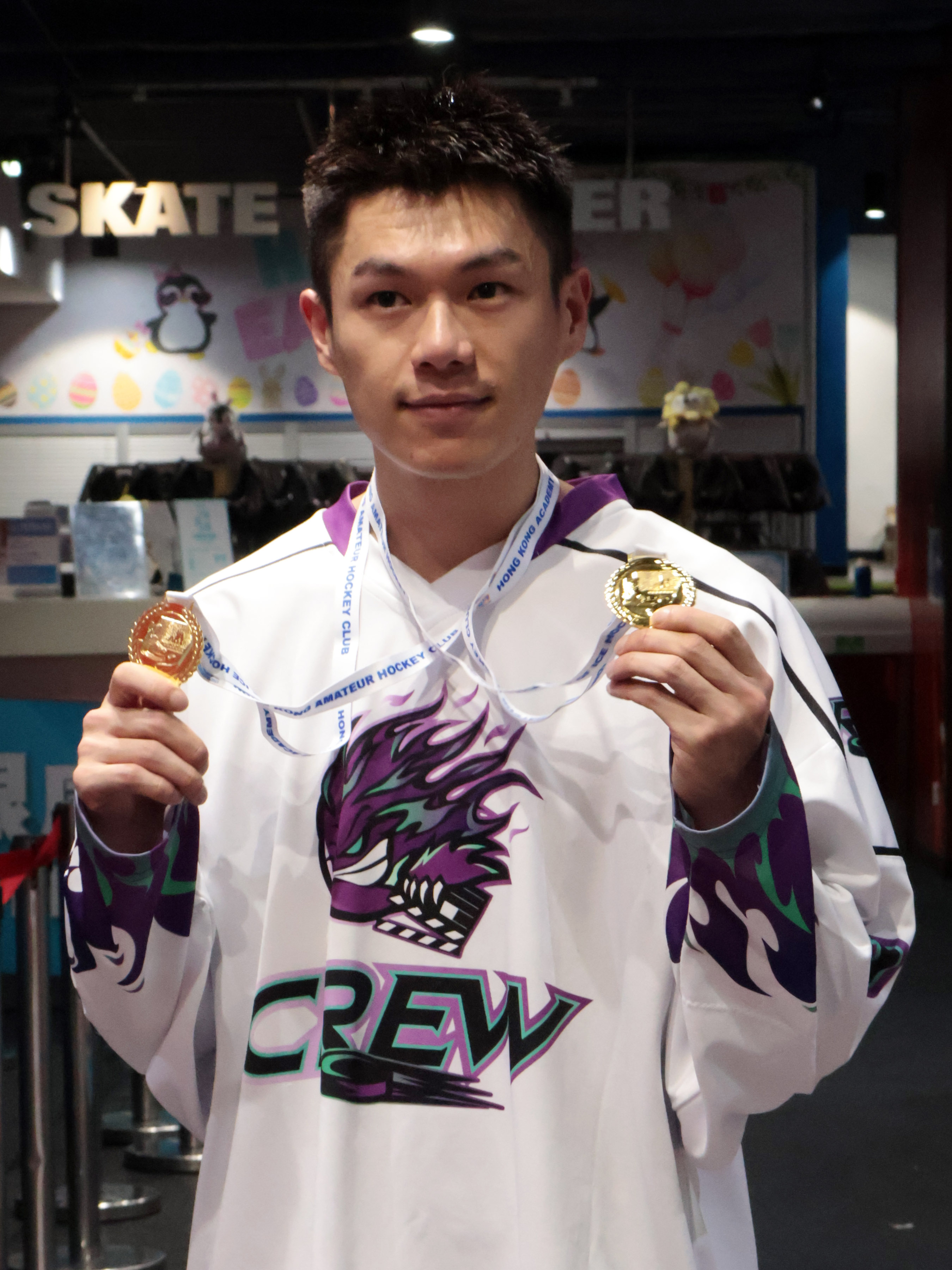
- Or in March 2024
- Born: Or Wai-lam; 22 January 1992 (age 34); Hong Kong
- Education: City University of Hong Kong
- Occupation: Actor
- Years active: 2016–present

Will Or Wai-lam (Chinese: 柯煒林, born 22 January 1992) is a Hong Kong actor best known for his role in the drama film Drifting (2021), for which he was nominated for Best Supporting Actor in the 58th Golden Horse Awards and both Best Supporting Actor and Best New Performer in the 40th Hong Kong Film Awards.

== Biography ==
Or was born on 22 January 1992. He attended and studied creative media at City University of Hong Kong, but quit before obtaining a degree to pursue an acting career in 2018. He featured in several short films during his university years, including the award-winning Why Don't We Share Our Solitude (Chinese:如霧起時). In 2015, Or wrote and directed To Absent Friends (Chinese:從缺), a short film enlisted in the Fresh Wave Festival, and made his film debut in the 2016 drama film Weeds on Fire. He then appeared in several films with minor roles, before starring in ViuTV drama series Till Death Do Us Part as Yan-kei and Leap Day as Jonathan, which the latter role had earned him widespread acclaim.

In 2021, Or was cast to star alongside Francis Ng in the drama film Drifting, which he received a Golden Horse Awards nomination for Best Supporting Actor and Hong Kong Film Awards nominations for both Best Supporting Actor and Best New Performer. He landed his first major television role as Oscar in ViuTV drama series Beyond the Common Ground in 2023, starring alongside Chiu Sin-hang, Ivy So, and Vincent Kok.

Or starred in the 2025 Taiwanese movie A Foggy Tale, a historical drama set during the White Terror period, which won the Golden Horse Award for Best Narrative Feature. He received a Golden Horse Awards nomination for Best Leading Actor.

== Personal life ==
Or announced in July 2025 that he had stage 4 adenocarcinoma of the lung.

== Filmography ==
=== Film ===
Year	Title	Role	Notes/Ref.
2016	Weeds on Fire	Bullshit (牛屎)	
2018	No.1 Chung Ying Street	Hoi (阿凱)	
2020	Apart	Wa Kwok Yin (華國賢)	
2021	Drifting	Muk (木仔)	
2021	Anita	Remus Choy	
2021	The First Girl I Loved	Sylvia's boyfriend	
2022	Sing 2	Darius	Cantonese voice dub
2022	Far Far Away	Tai-tung (大同)	
2023	One More Chance	Lee Yeung (李陽)	
2023	The Goldfinger	Ng Chi Fai (吳志輝)	
2025	A Foggy Tale	Gong Dao (趙公道)	

=== Television ===
Year	Title	Role	Notes/Ref.
2016	3X1	Jack	1 episode
2018	VR Exorcist	Aidan	2 episodes
2018	Guardian Angel	Jeff	1 episode
2019	Till Death Do Us Part	Yan-kei (昕頎)	Recurring role
2020	Leap Day	Jonathan	Recurring role
2023	Beyond the Common Ground	Oscar	Main role
2023	Food Buddies	Benjamin Yuen	Main role
2023	Sparks	Lam Bak Wai (林百威)	Recurring role
2024	Expats	Tony	Guest role

== Awards and nominations ==
Year	Award	Category	Work	Result	Ref.
2021	58th Golden Horse Awards	Best Supporting Actor	Drifting	Nominated	
2021	2021 Hong Kong Film Critics Society Award	Best Actor	Drifting	Nominated	
2021	40th Hong Kong Film Awards	Best Supporting Actor	Drifting	Nominated	
2021	40th Hong Kong Film Awards	Best New Performer	Drifting	Nominated	
2025	62nd Golden Horse Awards	Best Lead Actor	A Foggy Tale	Nominated	
