= Leung Ming Kai =

Hong Kong cinematographer and director

- 梁銘佳
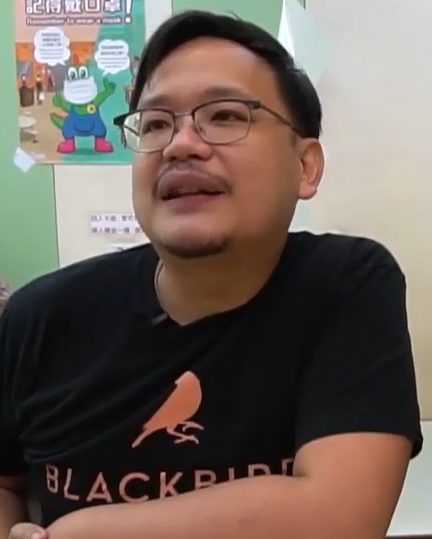
- Leung in November 2020
- Born: Leung Ming Kai; Hong Kong
- Education: University of Hong Kong (LLB, PCLL); Columbia University (MFA)
- Occupations: Cinematographer; Director
- Years active: 2009–present
- Spouse: Kate Reilly (m. 2012)

Leung Ming Kai (Note: Leung's name is spelled as "Leung Ming Kai" in the majority of reliable sources. Other variants include "Leung Ming-Kai", or "Leung Ming-kai".) (Chinese: 梁銘佳) is a Hong Kong cinematographer and filmmaker. Graduating with a law degree from the University of Hong Kong, Leung proceeded to study filmmaking at Columbia University and debuted as a film cinematographer in Southeast Asia. He subsequently returned to Hong Kong and produced the anthology film Memories to Choke On, Drinks to Wash Them Down (2019), earning Best Screenplay in the 27th Hong Kong Film Critics Society Award. He also shot the drama films Drifting (2021) and The Sunny Side of the Street (2022), which garnered him nominations for Best Cinematography in the 58th and 59th Golden Horse Awards respectively. In 2025, Leung won Best Cinematography in the 62nd Golden Horse Awards with Mother Bhumi.

== Early life and education ==
Leung was born in Hong Kong. His father was a taxi driver and later also operated a hi-fi shop in Sham Shui Po. Leung attended kindergarten and grew up in that area. While studying law at the University of Hong Kong, he developed his passion for films after participating in several film workshops. He graduated with a Bachelor of Laws and a Postgraduate Certificate in Laws in 2001 and 2002, respectively, but chose not to pursue a career in law. He attended Columbia University to study filmmaking instead, and obtained a Master of Fine Arts in Film with a specialization in directing in 2006. His graduation project, Three Boys, won the gold prize in the 14th ifva Awards.

== Career ==
After graduating from Columbia University, Leung began his career as a cinematographer, making his feature debut with Thai director Anocha Suwichakornpong's 2009 drama film Mundane History. He continued to work as a cinematographer on various international projects, including the 2015 Taiwanese drama film Murmur of the Hearts. He also cinematographed Suwichakornpong's 2016 drama film By the Time It Gets Dark and the Chinese-Canadian drama film Old Stone, for which he received a nomination for Best Cinematography in the 5th Canadian Screen Awards.

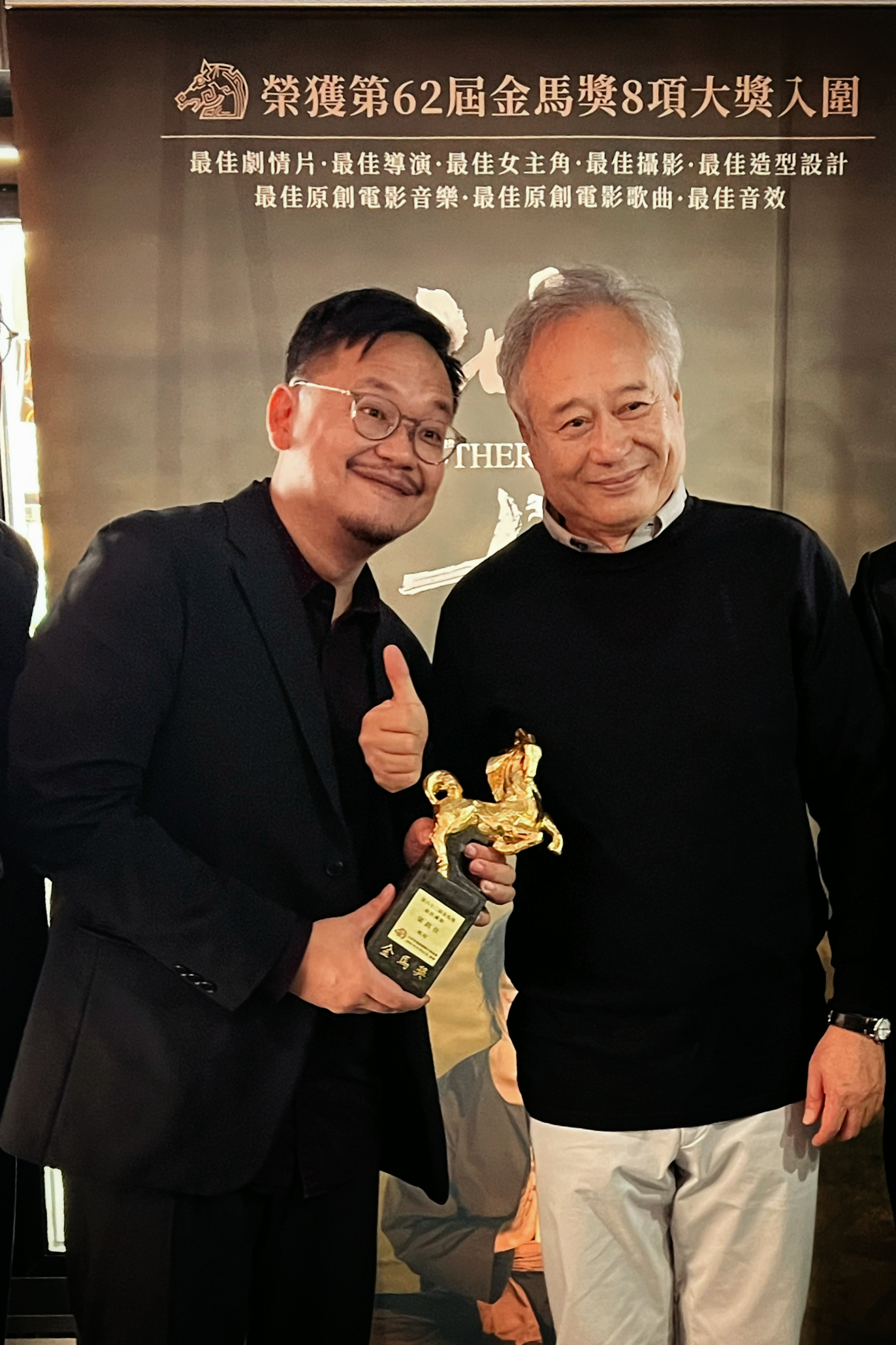
Leung (left) and Ang Lee at the 62nd Golden Horse Awards

In 2014, Leung participated in and documented the 2014 Hong Kong protests. Motivated by this experience, he co-wrote a screenplay draft with his wife, Kate Reilly, upon returning to the United States. The screenplay later evolved into the film Memories to Choke On, Drinks to Wash Them Down. Applying for funding from the Hong Kong Arts Development Council, the couple co-directed and co-wrote the anthology film. Leung also took on the roles of cinematographer and editor for the production. Due to political censorship by the Hong Kong government following the 2019-2020 Hong Kong protests, cautionary warnings were included in the opening credits when the film was theatrically released in 2020. Reilly and Leung received the 27th Hong Kong Film Critics Society Award for Best Screenplay for the film. After the completion of Memories to Choke On, Leung shifted his focus to Hong Kong cinema. He served as the cinematographer for the 2020 drama film Suk Suk directed by Ray Yeung. Leung filmed the 2021 drama film Drifting, earning him a nomination for Best Cinematography in the 58th Golden Horse Awards. He continued working as the cinematographer for the 2022 drama film The Sunny Side of the Street, earning him another nomination for Best Cinematography in the 59th Golden Horse Awards. Leung once again took on the role of cinematographer for Ray Yeung's 2024 drama film All Shall Be Well.

== Personal life ==
Leung is married to Kate Reilly in 2012, an American actress-producer he met in New York during his studies abroad in 2003. The couple has resided together in Hong Kong since 2015. Reily co-directed, co-wrote, co-edited, and starred in Leung's directorial debut Memories to Choke On, Drinks to Wash Them Down.

== Filmography ==
=== Film ===
Year	Title	Cinematographer	Director	Writer	Notes
2009	Mundane History	Yes	No	No	
2012	What Isn't There	Yes	No	No	
2013	Mutual Friends	Yes	No	No	
2014	Ek Hazarachi Note	Yes	No	No	
2015	Les Aventures d'Anthony	Yes	No	No	
2015	Murmur of the Hearts	Yes	No	No	
2016	By the Time It Gets Dark	Yes	No	No	
2016	Old Stone	Yes	No	No	
2019	Krabi, 2562	Yes	No	No	Documentary
2019	Memories to Choke On, Drinks to Wash Them Down	Yes	Yes	Yes	
2019	Ciao UFO	Yes	No	No	
2020	Suk Suk	Yes	No	No	
2021	Far Far Away	Yes	No	No	
2021	Drifting	Yes	No	No	
2022	The Sunny Side of the Street	Yes	No	No	
2022	A Light Never Goes Out	Yes	No	No	
2024	All Shall Be Well	Yes	No	No	
2024	Pavane for an Infant	Yes	No	No	
2025	The Way We Talk	Yes	No	No	
2025	Mother Bhumi	Yes	No	No	

== Awards and nominations ==
Year	Award	Category	Work	Result	Ref.
2017	5th Canadian Screen Awards	Best Cinematography	Old Stone	Nominated	
2019	27th Hong Kong Film Critics Society Award	Best Screenplay	Memories to Choke On, Drinks to Wash Them Down	Won	
2021	58th Golden Horse Awards	Best Cinematography	Drifting	Nominated	
2022	59th Golden Horse Awards	Best Cinematography	The Sunny Side of the Street	Nominated	
2025	62nd Golden Horse Awards	Best Cinematography	Mother Bhumi	Won	
2026	44th Hong Kong Film Awards	Best Cinematography	Ciao UFO	Nominated	
