= Golden Horse Award for Best Cinematography =

Taiwanese film award

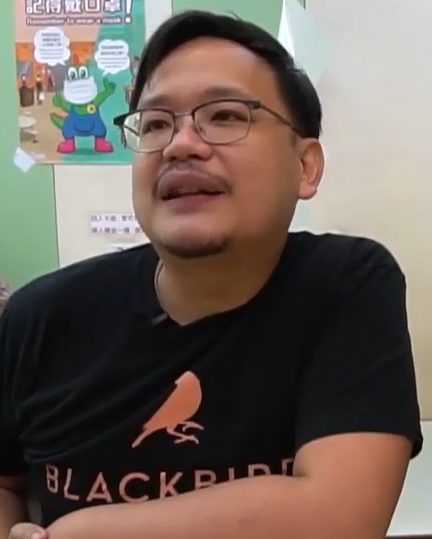
- The 2025 recipient: Leung Ming Kai
- Country: Taiwan
- Presented by: Taipei Golden Horse Film Festival Executive Committee
- First award: 1962
- Currently held by: Leung Ming Kai for Mother Bhumi (2025)
- Website: goldenhorse.org.tw

The Golden Horse Award for Best Cinematography (Chinese: 金馬獎最佳攝影) is presented annually at Taiwan's Golden Horse Film Awards. From the 1st Golden Horse Awards in 1962 to the 14th edition in 1977, the category was titled Best Color Cinematography. During that period, a separate award for Best Black and White Cinematography was also presented five times.

== Winners and nominees ==
=== 1980s ===
Year	Winner and Nominees	Film	Original Title
1987 (24th)
1987 (24th)	Bill Wong	Rouge	胭脂扣

=== 1990s ===
Year	Winner and Nominees	Film	Original Title
1990 (27th)
1990 (27th)	Poon Hang-Sang	Red Dust	滾滾紅塵
1991 (28th)
1991 (28th)	Poon Hang-Sang	Center Stage	阮玲玉
1992 (29th)
1992 (29th)	Lee Tak-Shing	Misty	霧都情仇
1993 (30th)
1993 (30th)	Mark Lee Ping Bin	The Puppetmaster	戲夢人生
1994 (31st)
1994 (31st)	Christopher Doyle	Ashes of Time	東邪西毒
1995 (32nd)
1995 (32nd)	Mark Lee Ping Bin	Summer Snow	女人四十
1996 (33rd)
1996 (33rd)	Gu Changwei	In the Heat of the Sun	陽光燦爛的日子
1997 (34th)
1997 (34th)	Christopher Doyle	Happy Together	春光乍洩
1998 (35th)
1998 (35th)	Jingle Ma	City of Glass	玻璃之城
1999 (36th)
1999 (36th)	Arthur Wong	Purple Storm	紫雨風暴

=== 2000s ===
Year	Winner and Nominees	Film	Original Title
2000 (37th)
2000 (37th)	Christopher Doyle and Mark Lee Ping Bin	In the Mood for Love	花樣年華
2001 (38th)
2001 (38th)	Mark Lee Ping Bin	Millennium Mambo	千禧曼波
2002 (39th)
2002 (39th)	Christopher Doyle	Three: Going Home	三更之回家
2003 (40th)
2003 (40th)	Liao Pen-jung	The Missing	不見
2004 (41st)
2004 (41st)	Cao Yu	Kekexili: Mountain Patrol	可可西里
2005 (42nd)
2005 (42nd)	Anthony Pun	Divergence	三岔口
2006 (43rd)
2006 (43rd)	Peter Pau	Perhaps Love	如果·愛
2007 (44th)
2007 (44th)	Mark Lee Ping Bin	The Matrimony	心中有鬼
2008 (45th)
2008 (45th)	Cheng Siu-Keung	Sparrow	文雀
2009 (46th)
2009 (46th)	Cao Yu	City of Life and Death	南京！南京！

=== 2010s ===
Year	Winner and Nominees	Film	Original Title
2010 (47th)
2010 (47th)	Chang Chan	When Love Comes	當愛來的時候
2011 (48th)
2011 (48th)	Zhao Fei	Let the Bullets Fly	讓子彈飛
2011 (48th)	Yao Hung-i	Hometown Boy	金城小子
2011 (48th)	Chin Ting-chang	Seediq Bale	賽德克·巴萊
2011 (48th)	Shu Chou	The Piano in a Factory	鋼的琴
2012 (49th)
2012 (49th)	Wu Di	Beijing Blues	神探亨特張
2012 (49th)	Lutz Reitemeier	White Deer Plain	白鹿原
2012 (49th)	Cao Dun	Love Is Not Blind	失戀33天
2012 (49th)	Jake Pollock	Girlfriend, Boyfriend	女朋友。男朋友
2012 (49th)	Song Xiaofei	Design Of Death	殺生
2013 (50th)
2013 (50th)	Philippe Le Sourd	The Grandmaster	一代宗師
2013 (50th)	Nagao Nakashima	Soul	失魂
2013 (50th)	Lü Yue	Back to 1942	一九四二
2013 (50th)	Yu Lik-wai	A Touch of Sin	天註定
2013 (50th)	Liao Pen-jung, Lu Ching-hsin and Shong Woon-chong	Stray Dogs	郊遊
2014 (51st)
2014 (51st)	Zeng Jian	Blind Massage	推拿
2014 (51st)	Dong Jingsong	Black Coal, Thin Ice	白日焰火
2014 (51st)	Du Jie	No Man's Land	無人區
2014 (51st)	Mark Lee Ping Bin	(Sex) Appeal	寒蟬效應
2014 (51st)	Zhang Ji	North by Northeast	東北偏北
2015 (52nd)
2015 (52nd)	Mark Lee Ping Bin	The Assassin	刺客聶隱娘
2015 (52nd)	Hsu Chih-Chun and Chang Chih-Teng	Thanatos, Drunk	醉.生夢死
2015 (52nd)	Christopher Doyle	Port of Call	踏血尋梅
2015 (52nd)	Lu Songye	Tharlo	塔洛
2015 (52nd)	Yu Lik-wai	Mountains May Depart	山河故人
2016 (53rd)
2016 (53rd)	Mark Lee Ping Bin	Crosscurrent	長江圖
2016 (53rd)	Du Jie	Detective Chinatown	唐人街探案
2016 (53rd)	Nagao Nakashima	Godspeed	一路順風
2016 (53rd)	Lu Songye	The Summer Is Gone	八月
2016 (53rd)	Guo Daming	Soul on a String	皮繩上的魂
2017 (54th)
2017 (54th)	Nagao Nakashima	The Great Buddha+	大佛普拉斯
2017 (54th)	Wang Weihua	Free and Easy	轻松+愉快
2017 (54th)	Chen Ko-chin	Shuttle Life	分貝人生
2017 (54th)	Matthias Delvaux	Old Beast	老獸
2017 (54th)	Peter Pau and Cao Yu	See You Tomorrow	擺渡人

=== 2020s ===
Year	Recipient(s)	Film	Original title	Ref.
2020 (57th)	Yao Hung-i	Your Name Engraved Herein	刻在你心底的名字	
2020 (57th)	Wayne Peng	Precious Is the Night	今宵多珍重	
2020 (57th)	Nakashima Nagao	Classmates Minus	同學麥娜絲	
2020 (57th)	Liao Ming-yi	I WeirDo	怪胎	
2020 (57th)	Chou Yi-hsien	My Missing Valentine	消失的情人節	
2021 (58th)	Giorgos Valsamis	American Girl	美國女孩	
2021 (58th)	Chung Mong-hong	The Falls	瀑布	
2021 (58th)	Kartik Vijay	The Soul	緝魂	
2021 (58th)	Chou Yi-hsien	Till We Meet Again	月老	
2021 (58th)	Leung Ming Kai	Drifting	濁水漂流	
2022 (59th)	Cheng Siu-keung	Limbo	智齒	
2022 (59th)	Leung Ming Kai	The Sunny Side of the Street	白日青春	
2022 (59th)	Chen Ko-chin	Incantation	咒	
2022 (59th)	Yao Hung-i	Salute	我心我行	
2022 (59th)	Charlie Sou Wai-kin	Kissing the Ground You Walked On	海鷗來過的房間	
2023 (60th)	Yu Jing-pin	Fish Memories	（真）新的一天	
2023 (60th)	Kartik Vijay	Abang Adik	富都青年	
2023 (60th)	Jake Pollock	Eye of the Storm	疫起	
2023 (60th)	Hsu Chih-chun	Snow in Midsummer	五月雪	
2023 (60th)	Chen Chi-wen	Who'll Stop the Rain	青春並不溫柔	
2024 (61st)	Wang Weihua	Bel Ami	漂亮朋友	
2024 (61st)	Imamura Keisuke	18×2 Beyond Youthful Days	青春18×2 通往有你的旅程	
2024 (61st)	Kartik Vijay	Yen and Ai-Lee	小雁與吳愛麗	
2024 (61st)	Michaël Capron	Mongrel	白衣蒼狗	
2024 (61st)	Aziz Zhambakiyev	Shambhala		
2025 (62nd)	Leung Ming Kai	Mother Bhumi	地母	
2025 (62nd)	Norm Li	Lucky Lu		
2025 (62nd)	Chen Ta-pu	Deep Quiet Room	深度安靜	
2025 (62nd)	Chen Ko-chin, Kao Tzu-hao	Left-Handed Girl	左撇子女孩	
2025 (62nd)	Jimmy Wong	96 Minutes	96分鐘	

== Superlatives ==
Since 1990, the following cinematographers have received two or more Golden Horse Awards for Best Cinematography:

Wins	Cinematographer
7	Mark Lee Ping Bin
4	Christopher Doyle
2	Poon Hang-Sang
2	Cao Yu

== See also ==
- Academy Award for Best Cinematography
- BAFTA Award for Best Cinematography
- Blue Dragon Film Award for Best Cinematography and Lighting
- César Award for Best Cinematography
- Hong Kong Film Award for Best Cinematography
- Mainichi Film Award for Best Cinematography
