= 96 Minutes (2025 film) =

2025 Taiwanese film by Hung Tzu-hsuan

- Chinese: 96分鐘
- Directed by: Hung Tzu-hsuan
- Written by: Hung Tzu-hsuan; Chen Yi-fang; Yang Wan-ju
- Produced by: Chou Chieh-chung
- Starring: Austin Lin; Vivian Sung; Wang Po-chieh; Lee Lee-zen
- Cinematography: Wang Chin-cheng
- Edited by: Lee Tung-chuan
- Music by: Chris Hou
- Production companies: WOWing Entertainment Group; Flash Forward Entertainment
- Distributed by: Machi Xcelsior Studios Co., Ltd
- Release dates: 20 June 2025 (Taipei Film Festival); 5 September 2025 (Taiwan)
- Running time: 118 minutes
- Country: Taiwan
- Language: Taiwanese Mandarin
- Budget: NT$160 million
- Box office: NT$207 million (Taiwan)

96 Minutes (Chinese: 96分鐘; Tongyong Pinyin: jiǒu shí liòu fēn jhōng) is a 2025 Taiwanese disaster action thriller film directed by Hung Tzu-hsuan and produced by Chou Chieh-chung. The film stars Austin Lin, Vivian Sung, Wang Po-chieh, and Lee Lee-zen. It is notable as the first Taiwanese disaster film centered on the Taiwan High Speed Rail system.

The film premiered as the opening film of the 27th Taipei Film Festival on 20 June 2025 and was released theatrically in Taiwan on 5 September 2025.

== Plot ==
Sung Kang-jen is a bomb disposal officer who left the police force after a traumatic incident three years earlier. During simultaneous bombings at a cinema and a department store, Sung chose to defuse the bomb in the cinema to save his wife Huang Hsin and his superior Lee Chieh, indirectly resulting in the deaths of hundreds of people at the department store. The event leaves him with lasting guilt.

On the third anniversary memorial of the attack, Sung and his wife Huang Hsin, a criminal investigator, board Taiwan High Speed Rail train No. 115 traveling from Taipei to Kaohsiung, scheduled to take 96 minutes. Soon after departure, they discover that explosives have been planted on the train.

The bomb plot is linked to another train No. 289 running in parallel. The countdown rates is set to inversely proportional of the train speeds; if the bomb on one train is disarmed, the explosives on the other train will detonate. The perpetrator behind the attack is connected to the earlier bombing incident and seeks to force Song into another moral dilemma involving sacrificing some lives to save others.

== Cast ==
=== Criminal officers ===
- Austin Lin as Sung Kang-jen, a former police bomb disposal officer
- Vivian Sung as Huang Hsin, a criminal investigator and Sung's wife
- Lee Lee-zen as Lee Chieh, a police unit commander involved in the earlier bombing investigation and Sung's former superior

=== Other characters ===
- Wang Po-chieh as Liu Kai, a physics tutor who becomes involved in the crisis
- Frederick Lee as Wu Chang-ren
- Lü Hsueh-feng as Sung's mother
- Eleven Yao as Yang Ting-juan, Liu's wife
- Kent Tsai as Yang Yi-hui, Yang's younger brother
- Ng Ki-pin as A-bin
- Wu Chien-ho as A-Ken
- Vera Chen as Train conductor Lü

== Production ==
Development of 96 Minutes began in 2017 with the completion of the initial script. The project received funding support from Taiwan's Feature Film Development Fund and the Taipei Film Commission's International Production Incentive Program. Additional investment was provided by the Taiwan Creative Content Agency and assistance from several local governments.

The film was produced with a budget of approximately NT$160 million. Filming began in April 2024 and concluded in May 2024. Much of the production took place at the Central Taiwan Film Studio in Wufeng District, Taichung, where a specialized Taiwan High Speed Rail carriage set was constructed. The smart filming studio for the train carriage cost approximately NT$20 million to build.

Director Hung Tzu-hsuan has stated that he was particularly interested in stories set within limited time and space, believing such constraints can intensify narrative tension and audience immersion. The production faced delays during development due to financial challenges and the impact of the COVID-19 pandemic on the film industry.

== Visual effects ==
The film contains more than 800 visual effects shots and involved around 90 crew members across the pre-production and post-production stages. The visual effects team used a virtual simulation system to preview scenes inside and outside the train carriage environment. Digital models of the train interiors were created using Unreal Engine, allowing the director to preview camera movements and lighting through tablet devices and game controllers. The production also employed LED virtual backgrounds, a technique rarely used in Taiwanese films at the time.

Footage of scenery along the Taiwan High Speed Rail route was recorded to create realistic exterior views through the train windows. Additional environmental effects, including rain and lighting transitions in tunnels, were added digitally.

== Release ==
The first trailer for the film was released on 27 May 2025. 96 Minutes premiered at the 27th Taipei Film Festival on 20 June 2025 and was later screened in the international competition section of the Bucheon International Fantastic Film Festival.

The film was released in Taiwan on 5 September 2025, followed by releases in Singapore on 30 September, Malaysia on 2 October, Hong Kong and Macau on 29 October, and Vietnam on 5 December. It was later made available for streaming on Netflix beginning 30 January 2026.

== Box office ==
96 Minutes earned more than NT$18 million during its opening weekend in Taiwan. Within seven days of release, its box office total surpassed NT$32 million. The film crossed NT$100 million after 19 days in theaters, becoming the second Taiwanese film released in 2025 to exceed that mark.

By 3 November 2025, the film had grossed more than NT$200 million at the Taiwanese box office.。

== Reception ==
=== Awards and nominations ===
Year	Award	Category	Result
2025	62nd Golden Horse Awards	Best Cinematography – Wang Chin-cheng	Nominated
2025	62nd Golden Horse Awards	Best Visual Effects – Wen Chao-ming; Lin Wei-hung; Hu Hung-yu; Fu Wan-ting	Won
2025	62nd Golden Horse Awards	Best Art Direction – Su Kuo-hao	Nominated
2025	62nd Golden Horse Awards	Best Action Choreography – Hung Hao-hao	Nominated
2025	62nd Golden Horse Awards	Best Sound Effects – Chen Wei-liang; Narubett Peamyai; Elwin T.	Nominated
2026	Taiwan Entertainment Film Awards	Box Office Award	Won
2026	Taiwan Entertainment Film Awards	Pioneer Spirit Award	Won
2026	Taiwan Entertainment Film Awards	Most Anticipated Sequel	Won
2026	Taiwan Entertainment Film Awards	Screen Couple of the Year – Austin Lin and Lee Lee-zen	Won
2026	Taiwan Entertainment Film Awards	Best Date Movie	Nominated

== See also ==
- Taiwanese cinema
- Taiwan High Speed Rail
