= Golden Horse Award for Best Animated Short Film =

Taiwanese film award

- Awarded for: Best Animated Short Film
- Location: Taiwan
- Presented by: Taipei Golden Horse Film Festival Executive Committee
- First award: 2016
- Currently held by: Zhang Xu Zhan for Compound Eyes of Tropical (2022)
- Website: www.goldenhorse.org.tw

The Golden Horse Award for Best Animated Short Film (Chinese: 金馬獎最佳動畫短片) is an award presented annually at the Golden Horse Awards by the Taipei Golden Horse Film Festival Executive Committee. The latest ceremony was held in 2022, with Zhang Xu Zhan winning the award for the film Compound Eyes of Tropical.
