= Drifting (2021 film) =

2021 Hong Kong film by Jun Li

- Official film poster
- Traditional Chinese: 濁水漂流
- Jyutping: Zuk6 Seoi2 Piu1 Lau4
- Directed by: Jun Li
- Written by: Jun Li
- Produced by: Mani Man
- Starring: Francis Ng; Loletta Lee; Tse Kwan-ho; Cecilia Choi
- Cinematography: Leung Ming Kai
- Edited by: Heiward Mak; Jun Li
- Music by: Wong Hin-yan
- Production companies: mm2 Entertainment; Medialink; With You
- Distributed by: mm2 Entertainment
- Release dates: February 2021 (IFFR); 3 June 2021 (Hong Kong)
- Running time: 112 minutes
- Country: Hong Kong
- Language: Cantonese

Drifting (Chinese: 濁水漂流) is a 2021 Hong Kong drama film directed and written by Jun Li. Starring Francis Ng, Loletta Lee and Tse Kwan-ho, the film is based on a 2012 actual court case involving homeless people in Sham Shui Po.

The film was selected for Big Screen Competition at 2021 International Film Festival Rotterdam, and made its Asian premiere at the 45th Hong Kong International Film Festival before its theatrical release on 3 June 2021.

== Plot ==
Ho Kei-fai ("Fai") is released from prison and returns to Tung Chau Street in Sham Shui Po, one of the poorest districts in the territory, and rejoins his fellow street sleepers. One day, without prior notice, the police and cleaners vacate their sleeping place and forcibly throw their belongings into a rubbish truck, despite their protest.

The group manages to build wooden huts under a nearby flyover as their new home. Social worker Miss Ho assists the street sleepers to file a lawsuit against the government, demanding both compensation for their loss and an official apology.

Among the residents of the wooden huts are drug addicts: Master, a Vietnamese boat person; Dai Shing, an electrician; Chan Mui, a dish washer; and Lan, a paraplegic person. After a long wait, Chan Mui and Lan move to a public apartment while a nonverbal young man, who is given the name Muk, joins the group. Fai gradually develops a bond with Muk but eventually leaves to reunite with his family. With Ho's help, Master reconnects online with his migrated family but commits suicide afterwards.

With the case being publicised, the group receives unwanted spotlight that focuses on their background stories instead of the injustice they are suffering. Amidst a long legal procedure, the government proposes a settlement. Fai is the only one who insists on an apology although all other members of the group are happy to accept the meagre compensation. This means the legal procedures have to continue.

One day, the police investigates an armed crime and discovers illegal arms inside the wooden huts, which causes them to announce a plan to demolish the huts. The street sleepers berate Fai for his stubbornness, but he stands his ground. As the deadline is approaching, they have no choice but to relocate. Left behind, Fai vaguely bids farewell to Miss Ho when she comes by with supplies for him.

Facing the coming winter nights alone and with the bleak prospect that the government will never apologise, Fai imagines conversing with his deceased son (appearing in the form of Muk), where it is implied that he may have accidentally caused his son's death and was jailed for this offence. Injecting drugs for one last time, Fai then sets the wooden huts on fire with himself inside.

The film ends with a reference to an actual case that happened in 2012 and comments that street sleepers are still facing unjust treatment.

== Cast ==
- Francis Ng as Ho Kei-fai (Fai; 何奇輝)
- Tse Kwan-ho as Master (老爺)
- Loletta Lee as Chan Mui (陳妹)
- Cecilia Choi as Social worker Ms Ho (何姑娘)
- Chu Pak Hong as Dai Shing (大勝)
- Baby Bo as Lan (蘭姑)
- Will Or as Muk (木仔)
- Yu Mo-lin as Sister Hoi (開姐)
- Cecilia Yip as Muk's mother
- Zenni Corbin as Hak (黑仔)

== Production ==
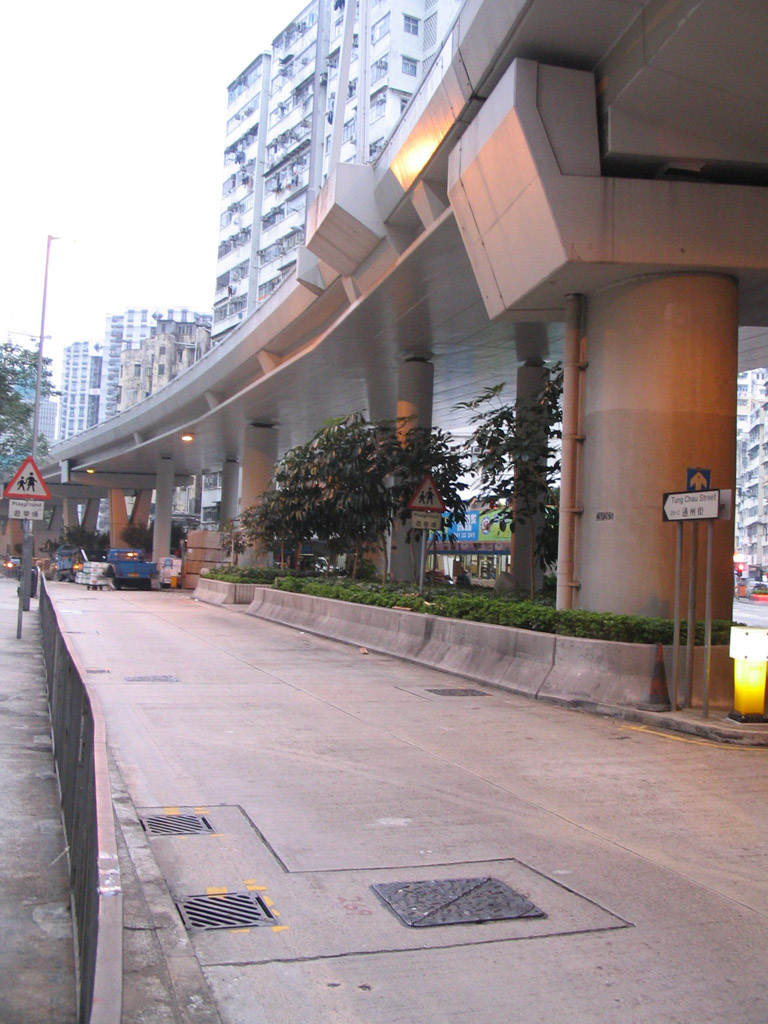
Flyover above Tung Chau Street

The director and storywriter Jun Li interviewed the homeless people and wrote an article on the incident on 15 February 2012 when he was studying journalism. The story of Drifting is based on this 2012 incident, where the government discarded the belongings of over forty homeless people without notice, treating essentials and family photos as trash. This drew scrutiny and sparked a legal battle. He later came up with the idea of wooden houses when working on another film project in 2016, and started writing the scripts in 2018.

When the filming took place in 2019, Hong Kong was undergoing an unprecedented social movement, which inspired Li to write the current ending. Most of the scenes were shot in Sham Shui Po, and the wooden huts were a recreation of street sleepers'. The crew wanted to set the scene on Tung Chau Street where the actual clearance took place, but the application was rejected by the government, which prompted them to choose a filming site under a nearby flyover. Due to the works already done on constructing the wooden huts, the filming took place on schedule despite the social movement.

== Release ==
The film was selected for Big Screen Competition at 2021 International Film Festival Rotterdam, and was screened at the 45th Hong Kong International Film Festival and the 23rd Far East Film Festival. It was released to the public on 3 June 2021.

== Accolades ==
Year	Award	Category	Recipient	Result
2021	58th Golden Horse Awards	Best Narrative Feature	Drifting	Nominated
2021	58th Golden Horse Awards	Best Director	Jun Li	Nominated
2021	58th Golden Horse Awards	Best Leading Actor	Francis Ng	Nominated
2021	58th Golden Horse Awards	Best Supporting Actor	Tse Kwan-ho	Nominated
2021	58th Golden Horse Awards	Best Supporting Actor	Will Or	Nominated
2021	58th Golden Horse Awards	Best Supporting Actress	Loletta Lee	Nominated
2021	58th Golden Horse Awards	Best Adapted Screenplay	Jun Li	Won
2021	58th Golden Horse Awards	Best Cinematography	Leung Ming-kai	Nominated
2021	58th Golden Horse Awards	Best Makeup & Costume Design	Albert Poon	Nominated
2021	58th Golden Horse Awards	Best Original Film Score	Wong Hin-yan	Nominated
2021	58th Golden Horse Awards	Best Film Editing	Heiward Mak, Jun Li	Nominated
2021	58th Golden Horse Awards	Best Original Film Song	"Drifting"; Lyricist: Wong Hin-yan; Composer: Wong Hin-yan; Performer: Wong Hin-yan	Nominated
2022	28th Hong Kong Film Critics Society Award	Best Film	Drifting	Nominated
2022	28th Hong Kong Film Critics Society Award	Films of Merit	Drifting	Won
2022	28th Hong Kong Film Critics Society Award	Best Director	Jun Li	Nominated
2022	28th Hong Kong Film Critics Society Award	Best Screenplay	Jun Li	Nominated
2022	28th Hong Kong Film Critics Society Award	Best Actor	Will Or	Nominated
2022	40th Hong Kong Film Awards	Best Film	Drifting	Nominated
2022	40th Hong Kong Film Awards	Best New Director	Jun Li	Nominated
2022	40th Hong Kong Film Awards	Best Actor	Francis Ng	Nominated
2022	40th Hong Kong Film Awards	Best Supporting Actor	Will Or	Nominated
2022	40th Hong Kong Film Awards	Best Supporting Actor	Tse Kwan-ho	Nominated
2022	40th Hong Kong Film Awards	Best Supporting Actress	Loletta Lee	Nominated
2022	40th Hong Kong Film Awards	Best New Performer	Will Or	Nominated
2022	40th Hong Kong Film Awards	Best Screenplay	Jun Li	Nominated
2022	40th Hong Kong Film Awards	Best Art Direction	Albert Poon	Nominated
2022	40th Hong Kong Film Awards	Best Original Film Score	Wong Hin-yan	Nominated
2022	40th Hong Kong Film Awards	Best Original Film Song	"Drifting" by Wong Hin-yan	Nominated

== Aftermath ==
In a 2022 ruling, the government was found liable for unlawfully discarding the belongings of homeless individuals during the 2012 Tung Chau Street clearance. Although the court confirmed the authorities acted improperly, the claimants were awarded only HK$100 each in symbolic damages due to the difficulty of proving the market value of their personal items. By then, two of the victims had already died.

In another incident in 2020, eight Hong Kong police officers, namely sergeant Lam Wah-ka, constables Kwok Chin-sing, Hon Ting-kwong, Leung Fei-pang, Pong Chun-sze, Mok Chi-shing, Wan Pak-sze, and Chan Sau-ping, framed and assaulted a 54-year-old Vietnamese homeless Le Van Muoi living in Tung Chau Street Park. Among them, six were found guilty in a 2024 ruling.
