= Murmur of the Hearts =

2015 Hong Kong-Taiwanese film by Sylvia Chang

- Poster
- 念念
- Directed by: Sylvia Chang
- Written by: Yukihiko Kageyama; Sylvia Chang
- Starring: Isabella Leong; Joseph Chang; Lawrence Ko; Angelica Lee
- Cinematography: Leung Ming Kai
- Edited by: Chen Po-wen
- Music by: Chen Yang
- Production company: Dream Creek Production
- Distributed by: Applause Taiwan (Taiwan)
- Release date: April 10, 2015 (Taiwan)
- Running time: 119 minutes
- Countries: Hong Kong; Taiwan
- Language: Mandarin
- Box office: NT$5.46 million (Taipei) $835k (China)

Murmur of the Hearts (Chinese: 念念) is a 2015 romantic drama film directed by Sylvia Chang. A Hong Kong-Taiwanese co-production, the film was theatrically released on April 10, 2015 in Taiwan. It was screened in the Contemporary World Cinema section of the 2015 Toronto International Film Festival.

== Plot ==
Yu-mei and Yu-nan, siblings born on the remote Green Island off Taiwan’s east coast, were raised on bedtime tales of mermaids told by their mother. As adults, they lead separate lives shaped by the trauma of their shared past.

Now a painter living in Taipei, Yu-mei is in a troubled relationship with Hsiang, an aspiring boxer. Haunted by resentment toward her late mother, Yu-mei begins experiencing hallucinations and insomnia, prompting her to seek counseling. Flashbacks reveal that her mother took Yu-mei and left Green Island when she was a child, eventually opening a restaurant and becoming another man's mistress in Taiwan. After her mother’s death, Yu-mei overheard her father expressing his desire to erase all memory of them, deepening her emotional wounds. On top of this, she discovers she is pregnant and fears Hsiang does not want the child.

Hsiang, meanwhile, is pursuing his dream of becoming a professional boxer. But as his vision deteriorates in one eye, he hides it—until his coach finds out and disqualifies him from competition. The setback leaves him adrift.

During a tense meal together, Yu-mei is overcome with emotion when she realizes the restaurant they’re dining in is the one her mother once owned. She finally tells Hsiang about the pregnancy. Though visibly conflicted, he reaches for her hand in a gesture of support.

Yu-nan, now working as a travel agent between Green Island and Taiwan, carries his own emotional scars. He believes their mother abandoned him and favored Yu-mei. As the story unfolds, both siblings confront their pasts and begin to find healing.

Years later, Yu-nan unexpectedly meets Yu-mei’s now-grown daughter, Hai, and Hsiang in a bookstore, where Yu-mei is holding a book signing. Hai shows Yu-nan her mother’s book, which he quickly realizes is based on their shared childhood. Reunited at last, Yu-nan and Yu-mei smile at one another, having found peace.

== Cast ==
- Isabella Leong as Yu-mei
- Joseph Chang as Hsiang
- Lawrence Ko as Yu-nan
- Angelica Lee as Yu-mei and Yu-nan's mother
- Wang Shih-hsien as Boxing coach
- Julian Chen as Father

== Reception ==
The film has grossed NT$5.46 million at the Taipei box office and, by May 4, 2015, had earned $835k at the Chinese box office.
