= Golden Horse Film Festival and Awards =

Taiwanese film festival and awards ceremony

- Traditional Chinese: 台北金馬影展
- Simplified Chinese: 台北金马影展
- Hanyu Pinyin: Táiběi Jīnmǎ Yǐngzhǎn
- Wade–Giles: T'aipei Chinma Yingchan
- Tongyong Pinyin: Táiběi Jīnmǎ Yǐngjhǎn
- IPA: [tʰǎɪpèɪ tɕínmà ìŋʈʂàn]
- Jyutping: Toi4baak1 Gam1maa5 Jeng2zin2
- Hokkien POJ: Tâi-pak Kim-má iáⁿ-tián
- Awarded for: Excellence in Chinese-language cinema
- Location: Taiwan
- Country: Taiwan
- Presented by: Taipei Golden Horse Film Festival Executive Committee
- First award: 1962; 64 years ago
- Website: www.goldenhorse.org.tw

The Taipei Golden Horse Film Festival and Taipei Golden Horse Awards (Chinese: 台北金馬影展; pinyin: Táiběi Jīnmǎ Yǐngzhǎn; Pe̍h-ōe-jī: Tâi-pak Kim-má iáⁿ-tián) are a film festival and associated awards ceremony held annually in Taiwan. The festival and ceremony were founded in 1962 by the Government Information Office of the Republic of China (ROC) in Taiwan and is now run as an independent organisation. The awards ceremony is usually held in November or December in Taipei, although the event has also been held in other locations in Taiwan in recent times.

== Overview ==
Since 1990 (the 27th awards ceremony), the festival has been organized and funded by the Motion Picture Development Foundation R.O.C., which set up the Taipei Golden Horse Film Festival Executive Committee. The Committee consists of nine to fifteen film scholars and film scholars on the executive board, which includes the Chairman and CEO. Under the Committee, there are five different departments: the administration department for internal administrative affairs, guest hospitality and cross-industry collaboration; the marketing department which is responsible for event planning and promotion, advertising and publications; the project promotion department attending to the execution of the project meetings; the competition department which is in charge of the competition and awards ceremony; and the festival department which is devoted to festival planning, curation of films and invitation of filmmakers, subtitle transition and production and all on-site arrangements during the festival.

The awards ceremony is Taiwan's equivalent to the Academy Awards,. It is one of the four major Chinese-language film awards, along with Hong Kong Film Awards, Golden Rooster Awards and Hundred Flowers Awards, and the only one amongst the four that is Oscar-qualifying. It is considered among the most prestigious film awards in the Chinese-speaking world for decades despite the mainland Chinese boycott in 2019. The awards are contested by Chinese-language submissions from Taiwan, Hong Kong, mainland China, Singapore, Malaysia, Myanmar, Nepal and Chinese diaspora elsewhere. It is also one of the major annual awards presented in Taiwan along with Golden Bell Awards for television production and Golden Melody Awards for music.

The Golden Horse awards ceremony is held after a month-long festival showcasing some of the nominated feature films for the awards. A substantial number of the film winners in the history of the awards have been Hong Kong productions. The submission period is usually around July to August each year and nominations are announced around October with the ceremony held in November or December. Winners are selected by a jury of judges and awarded a Golden Horse statuette during the broadcast ceremony. The awards was suspended in 1964 and 1974 and boycotted by some Mainland Chinese filmmakers in the after-ceremony party in 2018.

== History ==
In May 1962, the Government Information Office of the Republic of China (ROC) enacted the "Mandarin Film Award Regulation of Year 1962" to officially found the Golden Horse Awards. The name Golden Horse (金馬) is a common political term that originates from the islands of Kinmen, Quemoy, or "the Golden Gate" (金門 jīnmén) and Matsu or "the Ancestral Horse"(馬祖 mǎzǔ), which are under ROC control. The reasons were purely political, as these islands were ROC offshore islands that protected them from the mainland, and were heavily fortified during the Cold War. This was to imply the ROC's sovereignty over territories controlled by the People's Republic of China.

The awards ceremony was established to boost the Chinese-language film industry and to award outstanding Chinese-language films and filmmakers. It intends to introduce excellent films to Taiwanese audience from around the world to stimulate exchange of ideas and inspire creativity.

In 2019, the China Film Administration prohibited mainland Chinese films and filmmakers from participating in the Golden Horse awards, due to political tensions stemming from a Taiwanese filmmaker's award acceptance speech advocating for Taiwan's independence in the previous year. Chinese state broadcaster CCTV cited this incident from the previous year's ceremony as the reason for the ban. Taiwanese filmmaker Ang Lee, who was the Golden Horse Awards Committee's chairman, commented on the situation, highlighting how politics can negatively impact the arts. Subsequently, Hong Kong director Johnnie To resigned as the jury president for the 2019 Golden Horse Awards citing prior film production commitments as the reason for his resignation. However, there have been notable Mainland Chinese and Hong Kong filmmakers competing defying the ban, including Lou Ye and Geng Jun, with Mainland Chinese films winning the top prize in 2023 and 2024 respectively.

== Entries and eligibility ==
The awards ceremony pays attention not only to commercial movies but also to artistic films and documentaries. There has been some criticism of this from those who believe that this will not help the Taiwanese commercial movie industry much. However, the awards ceremony plays a significant role in helping the movie industry and drawing more people's attention to Chinese-language movies.

Under current regulations, any film made primarily in the Chinese language is eligible for competition. Since 1996, a liberalization act allows for films from mainland China to enter the Awards. Several awards have been given to mainland Chinese artists and films, including Jiang Wen's In the Heat of the Sun in 1996, Best Actor for Xia Yu in 1996, Joan Chen's Xiu Xiu: The Sent Down Girl in 1999, Best Actress for Qin Hailu in 2001 and Lu Chuan's Kekexili: Mountain Patrol in 2004.

== Awards ceremonies ==
Ceremony	Date	Host(s)	Location	Broadcast station
1st	31 October 1962	Wang Yun-wu	Taipei Guo Guang Cinema	
2nd	31 October 1963	—	Taipei Guo Guang Cinema	
3rd	30 October 1965	James Shen	Taipei Zhongshan Hall	
4th	30 October 1966	—	Taipei Zhongshan Hall	
5th	30 October 1967	—	Taipei Zhongshan Hall	BCC (Live)
6th	30 October 1968	Huang Shao-ku	Taipei Zhongshan Hall	
7th	30 October 1969	Chung Chiao-kuang	Taipei Zhongshan Hall	
8th	30 October 1970	—	Taipei Zhongshan Hall	
9th	30 October 1971	Lo Yun-ping	Taipei Zhongshan Hall	
10th	30 October 1972	—	Taipei Zhongshan Hall	
11th	30 October 1973	—	Taipei Zhongshan Hall	
12th	30 October 1975	—	Taipei Zhongshan Hall	
13th	30 October 1976	Ting Mao-shih	Taipei Zhongshan Hall	—
14th	30 October 1977	Hsu Ching-chung	Taipei Zhongshan Hall	—
15th	31 October 1978	Wang Hao, Ivy Ling Po	Taipei Zhongshan Hall	
16th	2 November 1979	Chiang Kuang Chao, Sylvia Chang	Sun Yat-sen Memorial Hall (Taipei)	
17th	3 November 1980	Chiang Kuang Chao, Sylvia Chang	Sun Yat-sen Memorial Hall (Taipei)	
18th	30 October 1981	Li Tao, Josephine Siao	Kaohsiung Cultural Center	CTS
19th	24 October 1982	Terry Hu, Chiang Kuang-chao	Sun Yat-sen Memorial Hall (Taipei)	CTV
20th	16 November 1983	Sun Yueh, Tien Niu	Kaohsiung Cultural Center	TTV
21st	18 November 1984	Wang Kuan-hsiung, Yao Wei	Sun Yat-sen Memorial Hall (Taipei)	CTS
22nd	3 November 1985	Sun Yueh, Terry Hu	Kaohsiung Cultural Center	
23rd	30 November 1986	Chang Hsiao-yen, Eric Tsang	Taipei Cultural Center	
24th	29 October 1987	Chang Hsiao-yen, David Tao	Taipei Cultural Center	CTS
25th	5 November 1988	Sylvia Chang, David Tao	Taipei Gymnasium	TTV
26th	9 December 1989	Ba Ge, Yin Shia	National Theater and Concert Hall, Taipei	CTV
27th	10 December 1990	Chang Hsiao-yen, James Wong	National Theater and Concert Hall, Taipei	CTS
28th	4 December 1991	Raymond Lam, Sibelle Hu	National Theater and Concert Hall, Taipei	TTV
29th	12 December 1992	Chang Hsiao-yen, Lawrence Cheng	Sun Yat-sen Memorial Hall (Taipei)	CTV
30th	4 December 1993	Sun Yueh, Fang Fang-fang	Sun Yat-sen Memorial Hall (Taipei)	
31st	10 December 1994	Regina Tsang, Kenny Bee, Chang Shih	Sun Yat-sen Memorial Hall (Taipei)	
32nd	9 December 1995	Chang Hsiao-yen, Sylvia Chang	Sun Yat-sen Memorial Hall (Taipei)	
33rd	14 December 1996	Hu Gua, Cally Kwong	Kaohsiung Cultural Center	CTS, Star Chinese Movies
34th	13 December 1997	Hsui Hao-ping, Sandra Ng	Sun Yat-sen Memorial Hall (Taipei)	ETTV
35th	12 December 1998	Isabel Kao, Jacky Wu	Sun Yat-sen Memorial Hall (Taipei)	CTV, Star Chinese Movies
36th	12 December 1999	Wakin Chau, Matilda Tao	Sun Yat-sen Memorial Hall (Taipei)	TVBS Entertainment Channel
37th	2 December 2000	Matilda Tao, Stephen Fung, Nicky Wu	Sun Yat-sen Memorial Hall (Taipei)	Much TV
38th	8 December 2001	Kevin Tsai, Isabel Kao	Hualien Stadium	EBC
39th	16 November 2002	Carol Cheng, Kevin Tsai	Kaohsiung Cultural Center	TVBS Entertainment Channel
40th	13 December 2003	Carol Cheng, Kevin Tsai	Tainan Municipal Cultural Center	TVBS Entertainment Channel
41st	4 December 2004	Kevin Tsai, Lin Chi-ling	Zhongshan Hall (Taichung)	TVBS Entertainment Channel
42nd	13 November 2005	Hu Gua, Patty Hou	Keelung Cultural Center	Azio TV
43rd	25 November 2006	Kevin Tsai, Patty Hou	Taipei Arena	Azio TV
44th	8 December 2007	Pauline Lan, Blackie Chen, Angela Chow	Taipei Arena	Star Chinese Movies, Phoenix Television
45th	6 December 2008	Carol Cheng, Blackie Chen	Zhongshan Hall (Taichung)	Star Chinese Movies
46th	28 November 2009	Matilda Tao	New Taipei City Hall	Azio TV
47th	20 November 2010	Kevin Tsai, Dee Hsu	Taoyuan Arts Center	TTV
48th	26 November 2011	Eric Tsang, Bowie Tsang	Hsinchu Performing Arts Center	TTV
49th	24 November 2012	Bowie Tsang, Huang Bo	Luodong Cultural Factory	TTV
50th	23 November 2013	Kevin Tsai	Sun Yat-sen Memorial Hall (Taipei)	TTV
51st	22 November 2014	Mickey Huang, Ella Chen	Sun Yat-sen Memorial Hall (Taipei)	TTV
52nd	21 November 2015	Mickey Huang, Lin Chi-ling	Sun Yat-sen Memorial Hall (Taipei)	TTV
53rd	26 November 2016	Matilda Tao	Sun Yat-sen Memorial Hall (Taipei)	TTV
54th	25 November 2017	Matilda Tao	Sun Yat-sen Memorial Hall (Taipei)	TTV
55th	17 November 2018	Matilda Tao	Sun Yat-sen Memorial Hall (Taipei)	TTV
56th	23 November 2019	—N/a	Sun Yat-sen Memorial Hall (Taipei)	TTV
57th	21 November 2020	—N/a	Sun Yat-sen Memorial Hall (Taipei)	TTV
58th	27 November 2021	Austin Lin	Sun Yat-sen Memorial Hall (Taipei)	TTV
59th	19 November 2022	Hsieh Ying-xuan	Sun Yat-sen Memorial Hall (Taipei)	TTV
60th	25 November 2023	Lulu Huang Lu Zi Yin	Sun Yat-sen Memorial Hall (Taipei)	TTV
61st	23 November 2024	Liu Kuan-ting	Taipei Music Center	TTV
62nd	22 November 2025	—N/a	Taipei Music Center	TTV
63rd	22 November 2026	Will Or	Taipei Music Center	TTV

== Award categories ==
=== Current categories ===
Merit awards
English name	Mandarin name	First awarded
Best Narrative Feature	最佳劇情片	1962
Best Documentary Feature	最佳紀錄片	1962
Best Animated Feature	最佳動畫長片	1977
Best Live Action Short Film	最佳劇情短片	1996
Best Documentary Short Film	最佳紀錄短片	2021
Best Animated Short Film	最佳動畫短片	2016
Best Director	最佳導演	1962
Best Leading Actor	最佳男主角	1962
Best Leading Actress	最佳女主角	1962
Best Supporting Actor	最佳男配角	1962
Best Supporting Actress	最佳女配角	1962
Best New Director	最佳新導演	2010
Best New Performer	最佳新演員	2000
Best Original Screenplay	最佳原著劇本	1962
Best Adapted Screenplay	最佳改編劇本	1962
Best Cinematography	最佳攝影	1962
Best Visual Effects	最佳視覺效果	1995
Best Art Direction	最佳美術設計	1965
Best Makeup & Costume Design	最佳造型設計	1981
Best Action Choreography	最佳動作設計	1992
Best Original Film Score	最佳原創電影音樂	1962
Best Original Film Song	最佳原創電影歌曲	1979
Best Film Editing	最佳剪輯	1962
Best Sound Effects	最佳音效	1962

Special awards
English name	Mandarin name	First awarded
Outstanding Taiwanese Filmmaker of the Year	年度台灣傑出電影工作者	1997
Lifetime Achievement Award	終身成就獎	1993

External awards
English name	Mandarin name	First awarded
Audience Choice Award	觀眾票選最佳影片	1992
FIPRESCI Prize	國際影評人費比西獎	2007
NETPAC Award	亞洲電影促進聯盟奈派克獎	2007
Observation Missions for Asian Cinema Award	亞洲電影觀察團推薦獎	2015

=== Discontinued categories ===
English name	Mandarin name	First awarded	Last awarded
Outstanding Taiwanese Film of the Year	年度台灣傑出電影	1997	2010
Best Director (Documentary)	最佳紀錄片導演	1986	1988
Best Planning (Documentary)	最佳紀錄片策劃	1962	1980
Best Cinematography (Documentary)	最佳紀錄片攝影	1962	1980
Best News Film	最佳新聞片	1968	1970
Best Directing (News Film)	最佳新聞片編導	1968	1969
Best Cinematography (News Film)	最佳新聞片攝影	1968	1969
Best Direction (Animation)	最佳卡通片編導	1977	1980
Best Child Star	最佳童星	1962	1984
Piaget Award for Best Original Screenplay	伯爵年度優秀獎	2013	2017

== Hosts ==
For the first fourteen award ceremonies, there were no regular hosts for the ceremony. Hosts began since the fifteenth ceremony; that year's hosts were Ivy Ling Po and Wang Hao. Since then, there are usually two hosts every year, sometimes with a combination of one host from Hong Kong and the other from Taiwan. A significant number of celebrities have hosted the ceremony, such as Jackie Chan, Eric Tsang, Kevin Tsai and Dee Hsu. In 2012 (the 49th awards ceremony), Bowie Tsang and Huang Bo were the hosts and Huang Bo became the first host from Mainland China in the history of the Golden Horse Film Festival and Awards.

== Records ==
- In 1972, martial artist and actor Bruce Lee won the Special Jury Award, Fist of Fury.
- Hong Kong actor Tony Leung Chiu-wai has won the most Best Leading Actor awards. He won this award at the 31st, 40th and 44th awards ceremony with Chungking Express, Infernal Affairs, and Lust, Caution. He also holds the record for actor with most nominations in the Best Actor category with 7 times.
- Hong Kong actress Maggie Cheung won the most Best Leading Actress awards. She won this award at the 26th, 28th, 34th and 37th awards ceremony with Full Moon in New York, Center Stage, Comrades: Almost a Love Story, and In the Mood for Love.
- In 2009, at the 46th awards ceremony, for the first time, two winners were jointly awarded Best Actor: Hong Kong actor Nick Cheung and Chinese actor Huang Bo.
- In 2006, at the 43rd awards ceremony, 9-year-old actor Ian Gouw was crowned Best Supporting Actor for his performance in After This Our Exile. He became the youngest winner in the history of the awards.
- Taiwanese actress Loretta Yang was named Best Leading Actress at the 21st and 22nd awards ceremony. She is the first actress who won this award for two consecutive years.
- Hong Kong actor Jackie Chan took the Best Leading Actor award at the 29th and 30th awards ceremony. He is the first actor who won this award for two consecutive years.
- Hong Kong actor Anthony Wong has won the most Best Supporting Actor awards. He won this award at the 39th, 40th and 42nd awards ceremony with the movies Xiang Fei, Infernal Affairs and Initial D.
- Chinese actress Wang Lai has won the most Best Supporting Actress awards. She won this award at the 3rd, 18th, 25th and 28th awards ceremony with the films Ren Zhi Chu, Xiao Hu Lu, People Between Two China and Pushing Hands.
- Chinese director and actress Joan Chen is the first person who won awards across two categories, the Best Director (in 1998 for Xiu Xiu: The Sent Down Girl) and the Best Leading Actress. Moreover, she was the first female to win this award.
- In 2012, the 49th awards ceremony, Huang Bo became the first host from China.
- Also in 2012, Hong Kong actor Chapman To was nominated as the Best Actor for the movie Vulgaria and the Best Supporting Actor for the movie Diva. He is the only person who is nominated in these two categories in the same year.
- In 2015, Taiwanese actress Karena Lam became the first person to have won the triple acting awards: Best Leading Actress, Best Supporting Actress and Best New Performer.
- In 2017, at age 14, Taiwanese actress Vicky Chen became the youngest person to have won the Best Supporting Actress award. She is also the only performer to have been nominated for two acting awards (Best Leading Actress and Best Supporting Actress) for that year.
- In 2020, at age 81 Taiwanese actress Chen Shu-fang became the first and oldest actress to win both Best Leading Actress and Best Supporting Actress in the same year.
