= Golden Horse Award for Best Visual Effects =

Taiwanese film award

- Awarded for: Best Visual Effects
- Location: Taiwan
- Presented by: Taipei Golden Horse Film Festival Executive Committee
- First award: 1995
- Currently held by: Garrett Lam, Ho Man-lok and Diu King-wai for Limbo (2022)
- Website: www.goldenhorse.org.tw

The Golden Horse Award for Best Visual Effects (Chinese: 金馬獎最佳視覺效果) is an award presented annually at the Golden Horse Awards by the Taipei Golden Horse Film Festival Executive Committee. The latest ceremony was held in 2022, with Garrett Lam, Ho Man-lok and Diu King-wai winning the award for the film Limbo.
