= Golden Horse Award for Best Makeup & Costume Design =

Taiwanese film award

- Awarded for: Best Makeup & Costume Design
- Location: Taiwan
- Presented by: Taipei Golden Horse Film Festival Executive Committee
- First award: 1981
- Currently held by: Ken Fan and Chen You-feng for Demigod: The Legend Begins (2022)
- Website: www.goldenhorse.org.tw

The Golden Horse Award for Best Makeup & Costume Design (Chinese: 金馬獎最佳造型設計) is an award presented annually at the Golden Horse Awards by the Taipei Golden Horse Film Festival Executive Committee. The latest ceremony was held in 2022, with Ken Fan and Chen You-feng winning the award for the film Demigod: The Legend Begins.
