= 58th Golden Horse Awards =

2021 Taiwanese film awards ceremony

- Taipei Golden Horse Film Festival and Awards 2021 poster
- Date: November 27, 2021
- Site: Sun Yat-sen Memorial Hall, Taipei, Taiwan
- Hosted by: Austin Lin
- Organized by: Taipei Golden Horse Film Festival Executive Committee

Highlights
- Best Feature Film: The Falls
- Best Director: Clara Law; Drifting Petals
- Best Actor: Chang Chen; The Soul
- Best Actress: Alyssa Chia; The Falls
- Most awards: The Falls (4)
- Most nominations: Drifting (12)

Television in Taiwan
- Network: TTV

The 58th Golden Horse Awards (Chinese: 第58屆金馬獎; pinyin: Dì 58 jiè jīnmǎ jiǎng) were held on November 27, 2021, at the Sun Yat-sen Memorial Hall in Taipei, Taiwan. Organized by the Taipei Golden Horse Film Festival Executive Committee, the awards honored the best in Chinese-language films of 2020 and 2021.

== In the news ==
Taipei Golden Horse Film Festival Executive Committee chief executive Wen Tien-hsiang announced that the Outstanding Taiwanese Filmmaker of the Year Award goes to texture artist Frank Chen, who leads the Frank Creation Co., Ltd. that contributed to nine of the nominated films this year.

During the awards show, Revolution of Our Times has received Best Documentary as both the judges and the audience were praised on this documentary film, awhile the filmmaker Kiwi Chow didn't attend the event that night, concerned for his security issues. Taiwanese president Tsai Ing-wen were also congrats on their win, calling the awards "home to all free artists."

== Winners and nominees ==
Best Feature Film: The Falls; The Soul; Drifting; American Girl; Till We Meet Again	Best Documentary: Revolution of Our Times; A Letter to A'ma; Solo Dancer; RAIN IN 2020; Dark Red Forest
Best Live Action Short Film: Good Day; The Poem of Pakistan; Neko and Flies; my sister; All the Crows in the World	Best Documentary Short Film: In Their Teens; Nothing in the Cries of Cicadas; The Catch; The Night; Ning
Best Animated Short Film: The Magical Tracing; Butterfly Jam; Depths of Night; Girl in the Water; Paddy	Best Director: Clara Law — Drifting Petals; Cheng Wei-hao — The Soul; Chung Mong-hong — The Falls; Jun Li — Drifting; Ho Wi Ding, Hu Chih-hsin — Terrorizers
Best Leading Actor: Chang Chen — The Soul; Kai Ko — Moneyboys; Cheng Jen-shuo — Gatao - The Last Stray; Roy Chiu — Man in Love; Francis Ng — Drifting	Best Leading Actress: Alyssa Chia — The Falls; Gingle Wang — The Falls; Chen Shiang-chyi — Increasing Echo; Karena Lam — American Girl; Caitlin Fang — American Girl
Best Supporting Actor: Liu Kuan-ting — Treat or Trick; Lung Shao-hua — Gatao - The Last Stray; Tse Kwan-ho — Drifting; Will Or — Drifting; Umin Boya — Till We Meet Again	Best Supporting Actress: Wang Yu-xuan — Goddamned Asura; Chung Hsin-ling — Man in Love; Loletta Lee — Drifting; Annie Chen — Terrorizers; Wen Chen-ling — Leave Me Alone
Best New Director: Fiona Roan — American Girl; Hsu Fu-hsiang — Treat or Trick; Yin Chen-hao — Man in Love; Rex Ren, Lam Sum — May You Stay Forever Young; C.B. Yi — Moneyboys	Best New Performer: Caitlin Fang — American Girl; Eve Ai — I Missed You; Lin Ju — Raydio; Moon Lee — Terrorizers; Devin Pan — Goddamned Asura
Best Original Screenplay: Chung Mong-hong and Chang Yao-sheng — The Falls; Ko Shu-chin — Echo; Lou Yi-an, Chen Singing — Goddamned Asura; Fiona Roan, Li Bing — American Girl; Fruit Chan, Jason Lam Kee-to — Coffin Homes	Best Adapted Screenplay: Jun Li — Drifting; Cheng Wei-hao, Veronica Jin, Chen Yen-chi — The Soul; Lin Yu-chen, Hsu Fu-hsiang, Ting Chang-yu — Treat or Trick; Chienn Hsiang — Increasing Echo; Giddens Ko — Till We Meet Again
Best Cinematography: Giorgos Valsamis — American Girl; Kartik Vijay — The Soul; Leung Ming Kai — Drifting; Patrick Chou — Till We Meet Again; Chung Mong-hong — The Falls	Best Visual Effects: Tomi Kuo, Liu Wei-yi, Cheng Wei-hao — The Soul; Chicken Rice — Treat or Trick; Aben Lee, Peter Hsieh — The Falls; ArChin Yen — Till We Meet Again; Hsu Kuo-chou, Dong Ming-xing — Plurality
Best Art Direction: Huang Mei-ching, Liang Shuo-lin, Liao Huei-li — The Soul; Hsiao Jen-chieh — Treat or Trick; Chao Shih-hao — The Falls; Wang Chih-cheng — Till We Meet Again; Chen Po-jen — Leave Me Alone	Best Makeup & Costume Design: Singing Lin, Hsiao Pai-chen, Liu Hsien-chia — Till We Meet Again; Jewel Yeh, Hsiao Pai-chen, Liu Hsien-chia — The Soul; Sung Kuan-yi — Treat or Trick; Albert Poon Yick-sum — Drifting; Hsu Li-wen — The Falls
Best Action Choreography: Chan Man-fai, Chu Ke-feng, Feng Ren-zhi — Nezha; Hung Shih-hao — The Soul; Hung Shih-hao — Treat or Trick; Gino Yang — Till We Meet Again; Jack Wong Wai-leung — Coffin Homes	Best Original Film Score: Luming Lu — The Falls; George Chen, Annie Lo — Listen Before You Sing; Lee Ying-hung — I Missed You; Wong Hin-yan — Drifting; Chris Hou — Till We Meet Again
Best Original Film Song: "I Missed You" — I Missed You; Composer; Lyrics; Performer: Eve Ai; "Oh Love, You Are Much Greater Than I Imagined" — Man in Love; Composer; Lyrics: Ng Ki-pin; Performer: EggPlantEgg; "Drifting" — Drifting; Composer; Lyrics; Performer: Wong Hin-yan; "Red Scarf" — Till We Meet Again; Composer: WeiBird, JerryC; Lyrics: Giddens Ko; Performer: WeiBird; "One by One" — Coffin Homes; Composer: Jan Curious; Lyrics: Jan Curious, Sit Chun-ning; Performer: Jan Curious	Best Film Editing: Shieh Meng-ju — The Soul; Lai Hsiu-hsiung— The Falls; Heiward Mak, Jun Li — Drifting; L2, Rex Ren — May You Stay Forever Young; Lee Huey, Ho Wi-ding — Terrorizers
Best Sound Effects: R.T KAO, Chu Shih-yi — Till We Meet Again; Book Chien, Lee Yu-chih, Chen Jia-li — The Soul; Tang Hsiang-chu, Agnes Liu, Ning Tseng — Treat or Trick; Boom SUVAGONDHA, Steve Miller, Warat PRASERTLAP, Varut OPASWATANAKUL — Nezha; Tu Duu-chih, Chiang Yi-chen, Chen Kuan-ting — Terrorizers	Audience Choice Award: American Girl
FIPRESCI Prize: American Girl	Outstanding Taiwanese Filmmaker of the Year: Frank Chen
Lifetime Achievement Award: Lin Tsan-ting; Tsai Yang-ming
