= Someday or One Day (film) =

2022 Taiwanese film by Huang Tien-jen

- Theatrical release poster
- Directed by: Huang Tien-jen
- Written by: Hermes Lu
- Based on: Someday or One Day by Chi-Feng Chien and Hsin-Hui Lin
- Produced by: Gavin Lin; Chen Chih-han; Lin Shih-ken; Ma Yi-ting; Chou Jung-jung
- Starring: Alice Ko; Greg Hsu; Patrick Shih
- Music by: Sun Shengxi Remembered
- Production companies: Three Phoenixes Production; Wanda Media
- Distributed by: GaragePlay (Taiwan); CMC Pictures (North America); Just Distribution / Intercontinental Film Distributors; (Hong Kong); Tianjin Maoyan Weiying Culture Media (China); AUD (South Korea)
- Release dates: December 23, 2022 (Taiwan (previews)); December 24, 2022 (China); December 30, 2022 (Taiwan); (see Release)
- Running time: 107 minutes
- Country: Taiwan
- Language: Mandarin
- Box office: NT$132,210,000 (Taiwan); US$5,010,000 (Overseas)

Someday or One Day (Chinese: 想見你) is a 2022 Taiwanese romantic drama film directed by Huang Tien-jen. Serving as a sequel to the 2022 television series of the same name, the film features the original cast, including Alice Ko, Greg Hsu, and Patrick Shih. The production is a collaboration between Three Phoenixes Production and Wanda Media, with Gavin Lin and Hermes Lu, the creative team behind More than Blue, joining the project. Picking up from the conclusion of the television series, the story begins at a new starting point. Soul-stirring dreams of déjà vu bind the spirits of Huang Yu-hsuan and Li Zi-wei together. Through the familiar songs on a cassette tape, the two repeatedly meet, get to know each other, and fall in love. However, their reunion triggers another cycle, tightly linking their fates with Mo Chun-chieh, Chen Yun-ru, and Wang Chuan-sheng, as they once again face a crisis where the past and future intertwine.

== Production ==
=== Background ===
During a live post-screening broadcast of the series finale on 16 February 2020, Ma Yit-ing, producer of the TV drama "Someday or One Day", stated that there were plans to produce a film adaptation, but that this would only proceed if a strong script was available. Lead actor Patrick Shih, whilst attending an event on 11 March 2021, confirmed that filming for the film version would commence and revealed that the original cast would be returning. Filming for the "Someday or One Day" film adaptation commenced in early May 2021, but was suspended shortly afterwards due to Taiwan’s COVID-19 pandemic being elevated to Level 3 alert; production resumed in August of the same year, and the film wrapped on 7 October.

Executive producer Gavin Lin stated that, whilst working on the film with screenwriter Hermes Lu, they believed the most important thing was to preserve the original characterisations and personalities of the series, avoiding unnecessary reinterpretation, and to place these characters within a new narrative framework, allowing them to take on a new lease of life.He revealed that the film adaptation has enlisted Kuo Li-chi, winner of the Golden Horse Award for Best Sound Effects, to handle the sound design, and Kuo Hsin-tsung, winner of the Golden Horse Award for Best Visual Effects, to oversee the special effects design. Together, they will create a 360-degree surround sound experience and magical visual effects, giving audiences the immersive sensation of travelling through time and space alongside the characters in the film.He said that the film contains many Easter eggs paying homage to the TV series, and that the film serves as both the beginning of the TV series and the conclusion of the "Someday or One Day" story; he hopes audiences will go to the cinema to experience the story’s grand finale.

Director Huang Tien-jen said that the film is a continuation of the TV series’ story, but can be understood even by those who haven’t watched the series, with elements from both the old and new stories interwoven throughout.Producer Ma Yiting revealed that the film will explore the emotional entanglements within the ‘Fengnan Squad’, whilst retaining the mind-bending elements of the original series; the character audiences are most eager to see saved will also make a return in the film.On 20 December 2022, the official release date was announced. Lead actors Alice Ko, Greg Hsu, and Patrick Shih, along with producer Ma Yi-ting, executive producer Gavin Lin, and writer Hermes Lu, attended a media press conference to share their experiences and behind-the-scenes stories from the filming of the movie. Alice Ko noted that both the film and the TV series are mystery-thriller stories cloaked in a fantasy romance setting. She added that whilst some of the unresolved plotlines from the series will find resolution in the film, there may well be new unresolved elements. She believes that fans of the series will not only be able to revisit the Fengnan Squad when watching the film, but will also feel as though they are reuniting with old friends.Greg Hsu stated that the film adaptation serves as a gift to fans of the original series. He noted that the “Fengnan Squad” would appear with new character developments and storylines, and that the narrative expands beyond the series’ Möbius strip concept to incorporate ideas of multiple universes and parallel timelines. He also remarked that, compared with the series, which allowed viewers to gradually follow the storyline, condensing its 13 episodes into a film of just over an hour was a challenging task. As a result, audiences need to pay closer attention to each character’s state and to the structure of the different timelines.

=== Cast ===
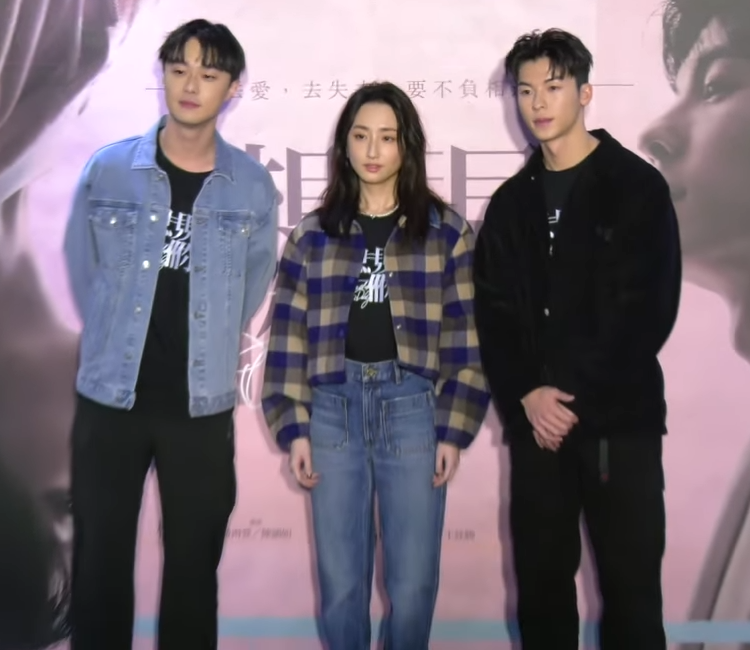
The main cast at a promotional tea party

- Alice Ko portrayed both Huang Yuxuan and Chen Yunru. She stated that having the opportunity to reprise the same roles was a rare and special experience.She said she felt somewhat embarrassed seeing herself in a high school uniform on the big screen. Regarding her return to the film adaptation, she described her feelings as complex, noting that the early stages of filming were somewhat challenging, as if she were acting with memories from a previous life. She revisited the original series in preparation for the role. When returning to the same filming locations, she felt both happy and nostalgic, while also sensing a feeling of continuation. She also revealed that she often found herself laughing while reading the script, as the scenes she imagined seemed absurd and unconventional. With multiple identities appearing simultaneously in the film, she was curious about how these scenes would be presented, remarking that it might feel as though audiences were watching them perform “shadow clone” techniques on screen.
- Greg Hsu portrayed both Li Ziwei and Wang Quansheng in the film. Reprising the same roles, he said it felt as though he had to imitate his past self, describing the experience as unique and noting that these characters would remain significant to him throughout his career. He also remarked that seeing himself again as a high school student made him feel somewhat self-conscious. Due to portraying multiple identities and psychological states, he often had to film the same scene multiple times. He added that the film’s narrative is more complex and contains more information than the original series, and that differences in character and psychological perspective sometimes left him feeling disoriented about his identity and surroundings during filming.
- Patrick Shih portrayed Mo Junjie. Regarding his return to the film adaptation, he said he felt both excited and emotional. In particular, returning to the same filming locations in Tainan and wearing the Fengnan High School uniform again initially left him unsure of how to approach the performance.Regarding the reunion of the ‘Fengnan Squad’, he believes that, both on and off screen, they have matured considerably after everything they have been through during this period—a situation very similar to that of the characters in the drama, who have shed their school uniforms, grown up and stepped out into the wider world.

Other returning cast members include Kuo Wen-yi as Kunbu (real name Lin Xiaorong), a close friend and colleague of Huang Yuxuan; Zhang Kuang-chen as A-Tuo, Huang Yuxuan’s colleague; and Chang Chia-hui as Sister Na, Huang Yuxuan's supervisor. Special appearances include JC Lin as Liu Yuheng, Wang Quansheng’s boyfriend who passed away due to illness; and Jin Shijia as Yang Hao, Huang Yuxuan’s supervisor during her assignment in Shanghai.

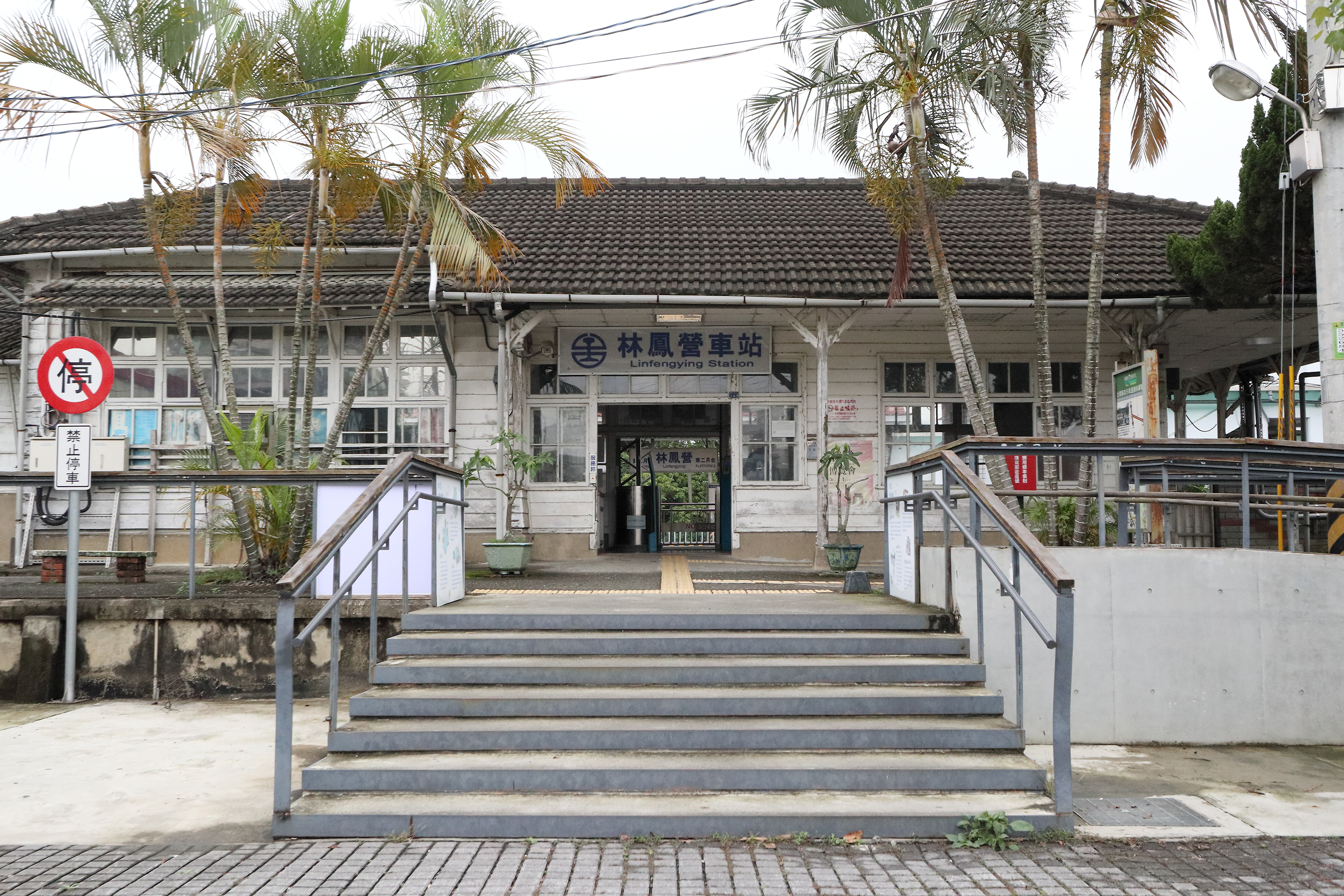
Linfengying Station in Tainan

=== Filming ===
In addition to returning to many of the iconic locations featured in the original series in Tainan, the film also shot at several local landmarks. For example, the station where Mo Junjie bids farewell to Chen Yunru is Linfengying Station.In addition, the film also shot at various locations in Taipei. These include the Cigu Salt Fields Seawall Sunset Trail, used as the seaside location where Li Ziwei and Huang Yuxuan go on a date; Hushan Peak Observation Deck, featured as their New Year’s Eve date location; Riverside Live House (Ximen Red House), which served as the venue for the Wu Bai concert; and Not Just Library, a second-hand record store where Mo Junjie reunites with Chen Yunru.

=== Music ===
The film soundtrack is released by Rock Records, which has previously collaborated on the series, with the digital version available on major music platforms from 18 January 2023.The physical soundtrack was officially released on 17 March of the same year, with the original singers of the series’ songs lending their voices to the film once again.The theme song, “Remembered”, was written and performed by Sun Shengxi. Nine Chen wrote and performed the insert song “The Girl in My Dreams”. Lead actress Alice Ko also performed the insert song “Obsessed”, for which she personally contributed to the lyrics.The film also retains the original series’ iconic ending theme, “Miss You 3000” by 831, as well as the classic time-travel insert song “Last Dance” by Wu Bai.

Soundtrack
No.	Title	Lyrics	Music	Artist	Length
1.	"Dream Song"		Chris Hou, Kao Yi-chien		0:33
2.	"The Beginning"		Chris Hou		1:21
3.	"Last Dance" (Insert song)	Wu Bai	Wu Bai	Wu Bai & China Blue	4:34
4.	"Someday or One Day" (Insert song)	Christine Welch	Sun Shengxi	Sun Shengxi	4:11
5.	"Fireworks"		Hsieh Tung-liang		1:21
6.	"Unease"		Chris Hou		1:16
7.	"Obsessed" (Insert song)	Darcy, Alice Ko	Darcy	Alice Ko	4:40
8.	"Message"		Kao Min-lun, Hsieh Tung-liang		3:44
9.	"Displacement"		Huang Wei-che		2:38
10.	"Miss You 3000" (Insert song)	A Pu 831	A Pu 831	831	4:01
11.	"Dream Song II"		Kao Yi-chien		0:42
12.	"The Girl in My Dreams" (Insert song)	Nine Chen, Tsui Wei-kai	Nine Chen	Nine Chen	4:00
13.	"Broken Promise"		Hsieh Tung-liang		1:25
14.	"Falling"		Huang Wei-che		3:43
15.	"Search"		Kao Min-lun		2:53
16.	"Roar of Time and Space"		Kao Yi-chien		1:12
17.	"Falling II"		Kao Min-lun		2:15
18.	"Once"		Hsieh Tung-liang		1:55
19.	"Loss"		Hsieh Tung-liang		3:38
20.	"Remembered" (Theme song)	Molly Lin, Sun Shengxi	Sun Shengxi	Sun Shengxi	4:05
21.	"Answer"		Huang Wei-che		7:06
22.	"눈물이 기억해" (Remembered (Korean version))	Shim Eun-ji, Sun Shengxi	Sun Shengxi	Sun Shengxi	4:05

== Plot ==
Huang Yuxuan and Li Ziwei were having the same dream. In it, they saw a familiar yet distant figure in the pouring rain, and listened to music together in a record shop. Yet when they awoke, although the dream remained vivid, they felt as though they were strangers to one another.In 2009, Huang Yuxuan met Li Ziwei, whom she had seen in her dreams, at the beverage shop where she worked part-time. Ziwei was immediately attracted to Yuxuan, and although they were strangers, they felt an inexplicable sense of familiarity and quickly grew closer.One day, Yuxuan told Ziwei about getting lost in Tainan as a child and being helped by an older boy who guided her home. She later realized that the boy was Ziwei, leading them to discover that their connection had been intertwined long before they met again.They then spent New Year’s Eve together in 2010 and became a couple.As their relationship grew more stable, they began living together in 2014. In 2017, Yuxuan was offered a job transfer to Shanghai. Faced with the prospect of separation, Ziwei told her that he would support whatever decision she made.In a hotel room in Shanghai, Yuxuan lay in bed looking at her chat messages with Ziwei, all of which were marked as unread, whilst his last reply dated back to 2014. As she gazed at an old video of Ziwei, tears streamed down her face. It turned out that Ziwei had passed away in a fall from a building on 10 July 2014, yet all these years she had pretended he was still by her side, carrying on with her life as if nothing had happened.

One day, Yuxuan received an anonymous package at her workplace containing a Walkman and a cassette tape of Wu Bai’s album The End of Love. While listening to “Last Dance”, she suddenly found herself in the body of another girl named Chen Yunru. She then realized that she had traveled back to July 8, 2014, a point in time before the incident involving Ziwei.She rushed to Ziwei’s studio and, upon seeing him, embraced him tightly. Ziwei was taken aback by Yunru’s sudden behavior after not having seen her for a long time. At the same time, Mo Junjie and Huang Yuxuan appeared in the same timeline and witnessed the scene.After inhabiting Yunru’s body, Yuxuan explained that she was not the real Yunru but Yuxuan from 2017 who had traveled back in time. However, Ziwei and Junjie believed that Yunru had simply undergone a drastic change in personality and did not accept her claim of time travel.In an attempt to prevent Ziwei’s death, Yuxuan kept a close watch on him, leaving him confused and frustrated. Despite this, Ziwei later disappeared while she was distracted. Yuxuan and Junjie rushed to the abandoned building where the incident had originally taken place, where they encountered two versions of Ziwei and another Yuxuan who attempted to attack her. They then realized that the Yuxuan in 2014 was in fact Yunru from 2017. During the ensuing struggle, Yuxuan was pushed against a wall by Yunru. In order to protect the Yuxuan who was about to fall (Yunru), the 2014 version of Ziwei held onto her and fell from the building, resulting in his death.After the incident, Yuxuan’s soul returned to 2017. She sought out Mo Junjie and encountered another “Li Ziwei” who had appeared at the scene. It was later revealed that he was Wang Quansheng, whose body was being inhabited by Li Ziwei from 2017.Quansheng told Yuxuan that the timeline he experienced was different from hers, and that in another timeline, it was Yuxuan and Yunru who fell to their deaths.In 2017, Ziwei, who had survived, learned from Quansheng about the possibility of traveling through time using a specific cassette tape. After losing Yuxuan, he purchased numerous tapes and repeatedly attempted to return to the past. Eventually, he acquired the particular tape with time-travel properties at a second-hand record store. Despite his repeated efforts to go back and prevent Yuxuan’s death, he was unable to change the outcome.Across different timelines, Ziwei and Yuxuan both attempted to travel back in time in order to save each other.

In the 2017 timeline experienced by Yuxuan, she, together with Quansheng and Junjie, attempted to locate Yunru, who was still alive. During their search, they discovered a photograph of Yunru with Yang Hao, Yuxuan’s supervisor in Shanghai.Yuxuan later traveled to Shanghai to find Yang Hao and learned that he was Yunru’s husband. Yunru had fallen into a coma following a miscarriage and passed away shortly afterward. Yang Hao told Yuxuan that he had learned from Yunru’s diary about the possibility of traveling through time using a cassette tape. Regretting that Yunru had met him, he attempted to travel back in time to change the outcome, but never succeeded. He eventually gave the tape to Yunru, which led to her traveling back and inhabiting Yuxuan’s body in 2014.After traveling back, Yunru, upon hearing Yuxuan’s determination to save Ziwei, came to believe that she was the cause of the tragedy. As a result, she decided to kill herself (in Yuxuan’s body) in the abandoned building, unaware that this act was part of an inevitable time loop.In the 2014 timeline, Ziwei and Yuxuan ultimately fell from the building. Unable to save them, Yunru (in Yuxuan’s body) and Quansheng (inhabited by Ziwei) bid farewell to each other as their lives came to an end.After Yuxuan’s soul departed, Yunru recorded everything in her diary. Due to her timid personality, she later avoided going to Shanghai, but eventually reunited with Yang Hao and married him.

In another 2014 timeline, Yunru, after experiencing the events, found Quansheng as he was preparing to move away. During his high school years, Quansheng had been bullied because of his sexual orientation and had once attempted to take his own life by the sea. Yunru stopped him in time and offered him support.Later, Quansheng met Liu Yuheng in college, and the two developed a close relationship. Yuheng gave him a cassette tape of The End of Love as a gift. However, Yuheng later became seriously ill and passed away. In 2014, while visiting his grave, Quansheng was overcome with grief as he looked at the tape, and his tears falling onto it activated its time-travel ability.Yunru later discovered the cassette tape among Quansheng’s belongings, and the two realized that the only way to change everything was to eliminate the tape’s power. Quansheng ultimately decided to let go of his memories of Yuheng, and together with Yunru, returned to the seaside where they first met and burned the tape to ashes.

With Quansheng’s help, Junjie arranged an encounter with Yunru at a record fair. He apologized for breaking his promise to attend a Wu Bai concert with her in the past. Yunru accepted his apology, and when he asked if she would listen to the concert with him again, she agreed. The two then listened to “Last Dance” together.Yuxuan later awoke in bed, feeling as though she had experienced a long and vivid dream. Seeing Ziwei lying beside her, she noticed that their little fingers were intertwined and leaned in to kiss him.In 2019, Yuxuan spoke with Ziwei via video call while he was on a business trip in Germany. He apologized for being unable to return to Taiwan in time for her birthday. After she ended the call in mild frustration, her colleagues surprised her with a birthday celebration. After making her wishes and blowing out the candles, she heard a familiar voice behind her. Turning around, she saw Ziwei kneeling with a ring, revealing that the celebration had been a planned surprise. Yuxuan happily accepted his proposal, and the two embraced and kissed as those around them looked on.

=== Narrative structure ===
The film’s narrative timeline begins in 2009 and primarily takes place in 2014 and 2017. Expanding beyond the Möbius strip framework established in the original series, the story incorporates the concepts of a multiverse and parallel timelines.

== Release ==
On November 12, 2022, the film’s title visual was released. On November 18 of the same month, Three Phoenixes Production released a teaser video.The teaser poster will be released on December 7th.From December 12 to 15, 2022, character teaser trailers for Mo Junjie, Chen Yunru, Wang Quansheng, Huang Yuxuan, and Li Ziwei were released.During the same period, the main visual poster and an early teaser trailer were also unveiled.The first trailer will be released on the 18th.The official release date of the film was announced on the 20th, and limited-edition film ticket packages went on sale that same day.Meanwhile, the film’s distributors in mainland China announced on the 20th that advance ticket sales had begun, with a preview screening on 23 December and the official release on 24 December.On December 22, 2022, a second trailer focusing on the multiverse concept was released.A New Year’s Eve edition trailer will be released on the 23rd.An exclusive global preview event for supporting cast members of ‘The Fengnan Squad’ will be held in Taiwan from 23 to 25 December.The film held its premiere on December 29. The main cast, referred to as the “Fengnan team”, made a box office pledge: as 2023 approached, if the film exceeded NT$20.23 million in box office revenue, they would treat fans to 500 cups of “full sugar sweetheart” bubble milk tea.The film was officially released in Taiwan on December 30. The date also coincides with the day when Huang Yuxuan dreams of Li Ziwei in the television series, making it a date of particular significance for Someday or One Day.

Released on 13 January 2023 in the United States, Canada, Australia, New Zealand and the United Kingdom.On December 16, 2022, a promotional event titled “Infinite Love Appreciation Event” was held in Taipei. Director Huang Tien-jen, producer Gavin Lin, screenwriter Hermes Lu, and actors Greg Hsu and Patrick Shih attended the event, which was hosted by Da Wen.On the same day, it was also announced that the “Fengnan Squad,” consisting of Alice Ko, Greg Hsu, and Patrick Shih, along with producer Ma Yi-ting and theme song performer Sun Shengxi, would travel to South Korea for promotional activities from December 26 to 28.Tickets for five cast Q&A screenings went on sale on December 19, 2022, and sold out within one minute.The South Korean organisers have therefore announced that additional performances will be added. It was announced on the 19th that exclusive clips will be screened in cinemas across Taiwan following the end credits of films showing between 20 January and 2 February.On the 25th of the same month, it was released in South Korea and Indonesia; on the 26th, in Singapore, Malaysia and Brunei; and on the 27th, in Cambodia.From February 4 to 6, 2023, actors Alice Ko, Greg Hsu, and Patrick Shih traveled to Hong Kong for promotional activities, making the film the first to conduct in-person promotion there following the lifting of travel restrictions. The film was subsequently released in Hong Kong and Macau on February 9, 2023.In February, the ‘Fengnan Squad’ appeared on the cover of the South Korean magazine "Cine21" and in the pages of "Elle Korea".On 1 August of the same year, the film was released on Disney+ in Hong Kong; on 15 September, it was released on Netflix in Taiwan, where it topped the film charts in its first week.The film will be re-released at CGV cinemas in South Korea on 25 January 2024.On the fourth day of the re-release, attendance exceeded 10,000.On October 7, 2023, the film was screened as part of the “BIFF Everywhere” program organized by the Busan International Film Festival, with actress Alice Ko in attendance.To be released in Japan from 12 September 2025.

== Reception ==
=== Box office ===
Prior to its official release, advance screenings featuring the cast and exclusive merchandise of the “Fengnan team” were held. Ticket sales began on December 21, 2022, at major cinemas across Taiwan, and the following day it ranked second on ez订 (ezDing), a major online movie ticketing platform in Taiwan, behind "Avatar:The Way of Water".The film’s preview screenings ran for three days, comprising 53 showings, with an 98% occupancy rate; box office takings across Taiwan reached NT$2.74 million, making it the top-grossing new release in Taipei. On its opening day, the film surpassed NT$9 million at the box office; combined with the preview screenings, total takings reached NT$12 million, making it the top-grossing new release in Taiwan and setting a new record for the opening-day box office of a Taiwanese film in recent years.The film grossed over 47.46 million yuan in its first four days, making it the top-grossing new release of the opening week.To fulfil their box office pledge, the ‘Fengnan Squad’ returned to their starting point, Tainan, on 7 January 2023, where they partnered with "Like Tea Shop" to distribute 500 cups of bubble tea to audiences as a token of appreciation; on that day, the cumulative box office takings exceeded NT$60 million; Box office takings exceeded NT$100 million within four weeks of release, making it the first Taiwanese film of 2023 to surpass the NT$100 million mark. The film’s final box office in Taiwan stood at NT$132 million.

After 29 days in cinemas in mainland China, the film grossed 400 million yuan.The film has attracted over 100,000 admissions in South Korea within five days of its release.On its opening day in Hong Kong, the film grossed HK$820,000, topping the box office charts for new releases; by 5 March, its Hong Kong box office takings had exceeded HK$12 million.

=== Critical response ===
Reviewer Queque noted that, compared to the intense and complex romance portrayed in the original television series, the relationship between Huang Yuxuan and Li Ziwei in the film developed more naturally. However, the film was considered to have condensed character development. The film also included numerous references and easter eggs paying tribute to the series, which might resonate with viewers familiar with the original, but could be less accessible to those who had not seen it.She further noted that the original series featured more complex character development and a higher volume of narrative information, which could not be fully incorporated into the film format, making it difficult for first-time viewers to fully grasp the story.Shangguan News commented that, although the film made a serious effort to construct its suspense core and timeline design, its limited runtime prevented a full development of details, resulting in a somewhat underdeveloped narrative. The film was also seen as lacking the “information-rich” impact of the original series and failing to elevate the story’s scope, which diminished the value of the franchise.Film critic Xianggongtangzhu praised the film’s overall production quality, highlighting its cinematography, lighting, art direction, and musical score. The performances of Greg Hsu and Alice Ko were also commended for effectively distinguishing between their characters. The reviewer noted that the expanded focus on Wang Quansheng’s storyline helped address unresolved elements from the original series. However, the introduction of a new character, Yang Hao, was seen as diminishing the significance of Mo Junjie’s role, while also disrupting the film’s pacing and weakening its emotional coherence.

Editors at "The Beijing News" believe that the reason the film adaptation has received less favourable reviews than the TV series is, first and foremost, that the 1990s song ‘Last Dance’ was perfectly suited to the TV series’ 1998 setting, but in the film’s 2014 setting, the use of this song which is nearly 20 years old and the use of cassette tapes to travel through time feels out of place.The reviewer further observed that, although the producers emphasized that the film could be viewed as a standalone story without prior knowledge of the television series, this created a dilemma in balancing new and existing audiences. Viewers unfamiliar with the original series might find it difficult to fully understand the emotional foundation between Huang Yuxuan and Li Ziwei. Meanwhile, audiences familiar with the series might note the absence of the high school storyline and the reduced or omitted roles of key supporting characters. Additionally, the frequent body and soul exchanges among the main characters were seen as blurring character identities, making it difficult to distinguish personalities without relying on visual styling and vocal cues.Due to the film’s flawed narrative structure, and having discarded the subplots and significant themes present in the TV series, all characters other than the lead couple have been reduced to mere backdrops. Furthermore, the relationship between the leads, stripped of the karmic ties spanning past and present lives that were established in the TV series, has been transformed into a completely different kind of mutual pursuit, making it difficult to truly move the audience. The Beijing Youth Daily noted that the film version follows the original character settings and emotional logic; however, the romantic moments may feel abrupt and forced for viewers unfamiliar with the original work, making it difficult for them to emotionally engage with the characters.
