= Someday or One Day =

Taiwanese television series

- Promotional Poster
- Also known as: KR: 상견니; JP: 時をかける愛
- Traditional Chinese: 想見你
- Hanyu Pinyin: Xiǎng Jiàn Nǐ
- Genre: Romance; Comedy; Time travel; Inference; Suspense; Thriller; Mystery
- Written by: Chien Chi-feng (簡奇峯); Lin Hsin-hui (林欣慧)
- Directed by: Huang Tien-jen (黃天仁)
- Starring: Ko Chia-yen; Greg Han; Patrick Shih
- Theme music composer: Wu Chia-hsiang (吳嘉祥); Lin Kuo-kai (林國凱); Hsu Chi-yang (徐啟洋); Chen Jen-shuo (陳人碩); Hsu Yi-hung (許一鴻)
- Opening theme: "Someday or One Day" by Shi Shi
- Ending theme: "Miss You 3000" by 831
- Country of origin: Republic of China (Taiwan)
- Original language: Mandarin
- No. of episodes: 13

Production
- Producers: Chih-han (陳芷涵); Phoebe Ma (麻怡婷)
- Editors: Chang Fei-chi (張斐棋); Lee Yung-han (李泳漢)
- Running time: 72 minutes
- Production companies: Fox Networks Group Asia Pacific; Three Phoenixes Production Co. Ltd. (三鳳製作)

Original release
- Network: CTV
- Release: November 23, 2019 – February 22, 2020

Related
- A Time Called You (South Korea)

Someday or One Day (Chinese: 想見你; pinyin: Xiǎng Jiàn Nǐ; lit. 'Want to See You') is a Taiwanese TV drama released in 2019 directed by Huang Tien-jen (黃天仁), and stars Alice Ko, Greg Han, Patrick Shih and Kenny Yen. It was produced by Fox Networks Group Asia Pacific, Hualien Media International, and Three Phoenixes Production Co. Ltd. (三鳳製作), and received NT$22 million in subsidy from the Bureau of Audiovisual and Music Industry Development.

The drama aired on CTV every Sunday at 10:00 pm, from November 17, 2019, to February 16, 2020. After its finale, Someday or One Day was screened on Star Chinese Channel every other Saturday, with behind-the-scenes footage titled "想見你 不見不散" (lit. 'Wanting to see you - don't leave until we see each other') following each episode.

A theatrical version of the series (which serves as a semi-continuation and adaptation) was released in 2022.

== Premise ==
After the death of her boyfriend, Wang Chuan-sheng (Greg Hsu), Huang Yu-hsuan (Ko Chia-yen) misses and longs to see her deceased boyfriend. Out of grief, Yu-hsuan frequently sends him text messages, hoping that he will somehow receive them.

One day, Yu-hsuan receives a parcel containing an old-school Walkman portable cassette player and a cassette tape of Wu Bai's album The End of Love. While listening to the tape on a bus, she falls asleep. Upon awaking, she discovers she has been transported to 1998, and has taken over the body of a high school girl named Chen Yun-ru. The night before, Chen Yun-ru had been hit by a car. When Yu-hsuan regains consciousness in Yun-ru's body, she sees a boy beside her hospital bed, who looks exactly the same as her late boyfriend. At first, Yu-hsuan believes she has been reunited with Chuan-sheng, but she learns things are not how they appear.

Trapped in living another person's life, Yu-hsuan tries to rewrite Yun-ru's fate. As she plays with destiny, Yu-hsuan learns about Yun-ru's "mysterious traffic accident".

== Cast ==
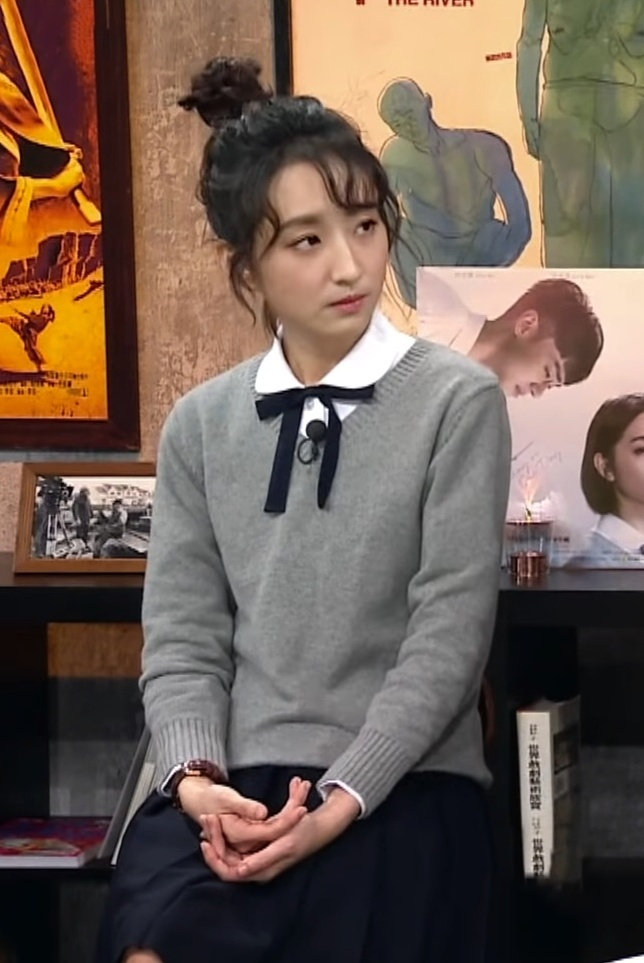
Ko Chia-yen, who portrayed the role of Huang Yu-hsuan and Chen Yun-ru.

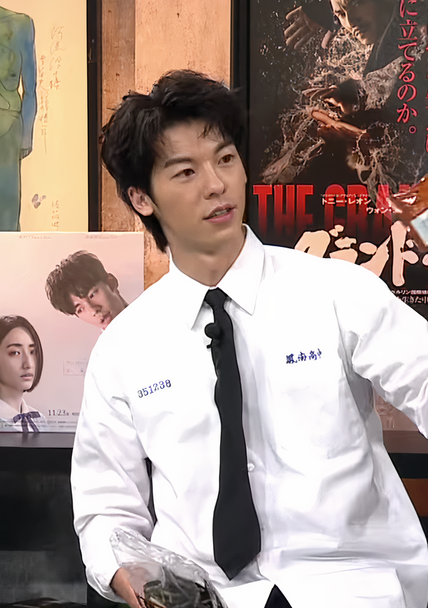
Greg Hsu, who portrayed the role of Wang Chuan-sheng and Li Zi-wei.

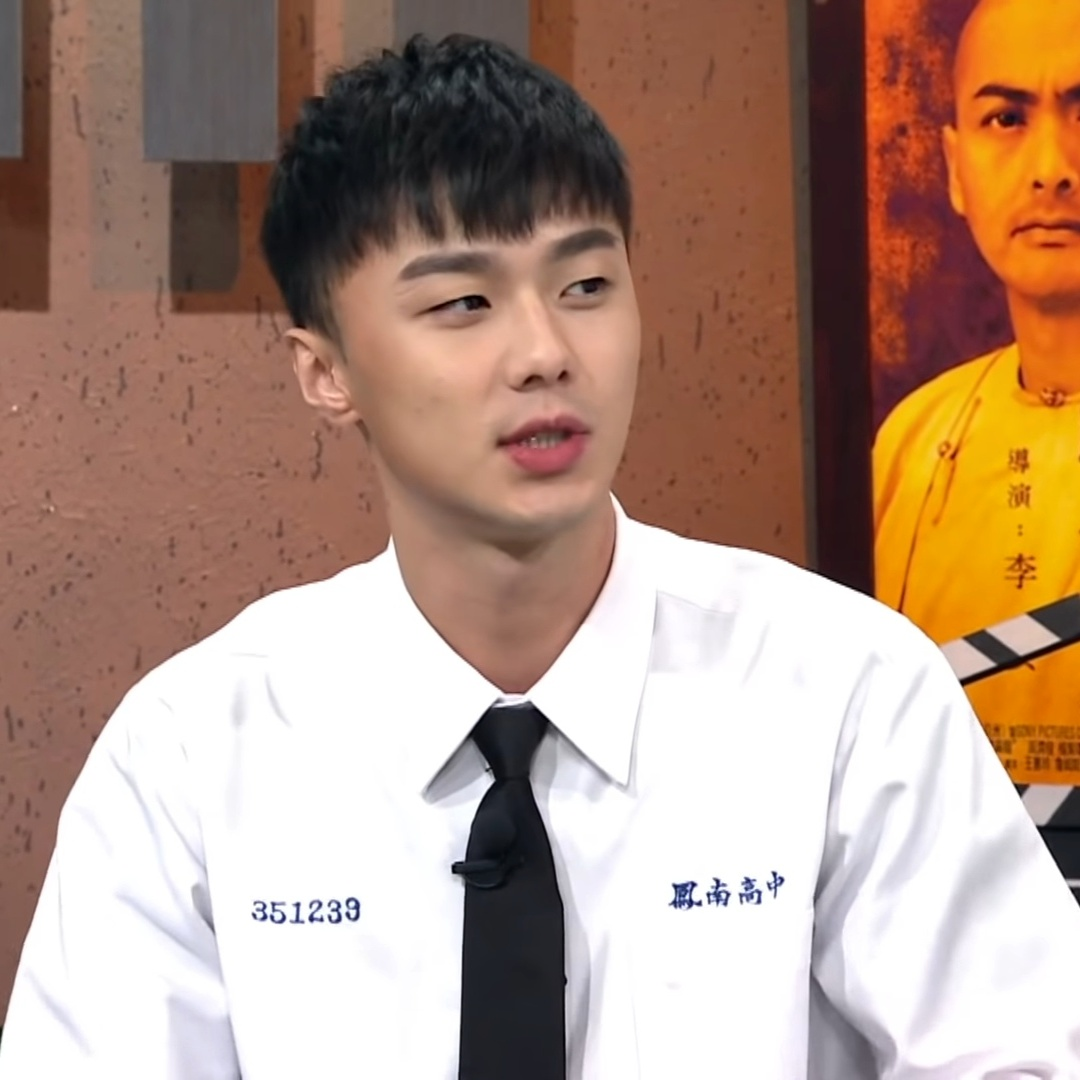
The role of Mo Jun-jie was portrayed by Patrick Shih.

=== Main cast ===
- Ko Chia-yen (柯佳嬿) as Huang Yu-hsuan (黃雨萱) / Chen Yun-ru (陳韻如)
- Greg Hsu (許光漢) as Wang Chuan-sheng (王詮勝) / Li Zi-wei (李子維)
- Patrick Shih (施柏宇) as Mo Jun-jie (莫俊傑)
- Yen Yu-lin (顏毓麟) as Hsieh Chih-chi (謝芝齊) / Hsieh Tsung-ju (謝宗儒)

=== Other cast ===
- Yen Yi-wen (嚴藝文) as Wu Ying-chan (吳瑛嬋)
- Da-her Lin (林鶴軒) as Chen Si-yuan (陳思源)
- Chang Han (張翰) as Wu Wen-lei (吳文磊)
- Da-Wen (大文) as Kun-Bu (昆布)
- Da-Fei (大飛) as A-Tsai (陳財裕 / 阿財)
- Zhang Kuang-chen (章廣辰) as A-Tuo (阿脫)
- Lin Zi-shan (林子珊) as Hsiao Dai (小黛)

=== Special appearance ===
- Chan Jia-huei (張家慧) as Madam Na (娜姐)
- Joanne Tseng as Ms. Sunny (Sunny老師)
- Dewi Chien as Vicky
- Prince Chiu as Yan Li-zheng (顏力正)
- Bokeh Kosang as Instructor
- Erato Liang (梁洳瑄) as Tsai Wen-jou (蔡雯柔)
- Scott Yang (楊翹碩) as Chang Chi-en (張奇恩)
- A-Han (阿翰) as Lin-Yue (澟月)
- Ma Hui-zhen (馬惠珍) as Grandma Mo (莫奶奶)
- Any.C (Any安偉) as A-Nan (阿南)
- Zhu Zhi-ying (朱芷瑩) as Yang Bi-yun (楊碧雲)
- Simon Lian as A-Zhe (阿哲)
- Alien Huang as Du Chi-min (杜齊閔)

== Production ==
=== Background and creation ===
Screenwriters Chien Chi-feng and Lin Hsin-hui were nominated for "Best Writing for a Television Series" in the Golden Bell Awards for the series Ex-Boyfriend and Marry Me, or Not?. They reunited with the director, Huang Tien-jen, after working with him on What Is Love and Attention, Love! During the series' preview, Chien revealed the creative origins of Someday Or One Day and how one of the producers, Ma Yi-ting, wanted to create a "drama that would make people cry without knowing it". Chien derived inspiration from a dream: "In my dream, I was writing in a hurry; writing about the love story of a male and a female protagonist who have been together for 13 years. The drama used flashbacks extensively, taking them from age 29 back to their high school days, showing their mutual love." He told Lin about his dream and they wrote the story together. The result was described as "[a] script written with God guiding the screenwriter's hands".

Ma has stated that preparations were the most difficult part of the drama. Since the leading actors needed to play two separate characters in the series, the production staff needed to recruit skilled actors, but they also wanted to find a fresh combination of leads. Another challenge was posed by the two time periods portrayed in the drama: 1998 and 2019. This made it necessary to recreate the atmosphere of 1998 in some scenes, but in a way that was not too abrupt.

The screenwriters expressed in an interview that they like to challenge themselves with topics that others dare not write about. Although Someday Or One Day contains elements of romance, time travel, and mystery, the real subject is adolescent identity. Lin said that each of the three young protagonists has some special trait, but they are unable to take their traits seriously. She stated that the troubles of adolescents are easily overlooked by others who think they are too young to have real worries, but that the problem is very serious in reality. The importance of feelings and self-expression inspired the choices throughout the series. One notable episode illustrates the toll of grief and the writers state "If you can't understand that kind of sadness as a screenwriter, you will never write a good script."

Chien said he took names from people he knew as inspiration: Wang Quan-Sheng was Chien's classmate in elementary school, Mo Jun-Jie was a middle school classmate, and Li Zi-Wei and Chen Yun-Ru were his classmates in high school.

The drama was originally titled Read But Ignored (已讀不回), but was subsequently changed to Love, Read but Ignored (愛，已讀不回). "Want to see you" (想見你) was originally the subtitle of the script, but it became the main title. As the protagonists were able to travel through time and space because of their determination to see each other, the English version was retitled Someday or One Day, which represents "There is a possibility that one day when the future is the past, and the past is also the future?", and "This matter of wanting to see you, is not just on a certain day, it is from the past to the future, and from the future to the past".

=== Filming ===
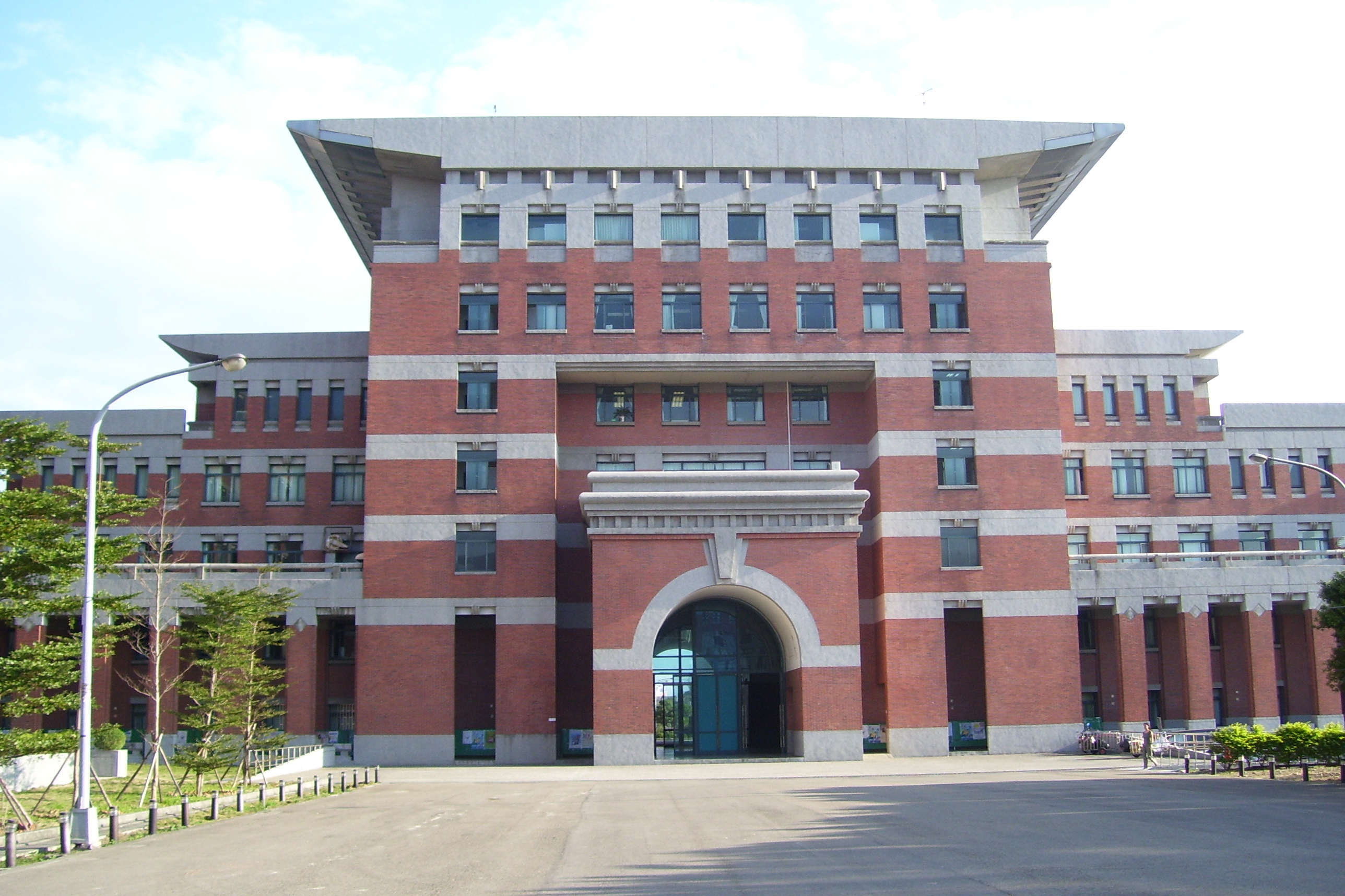
The scenes involving the university where Huang and Wang (Li) attended were filmed at Kainan University.

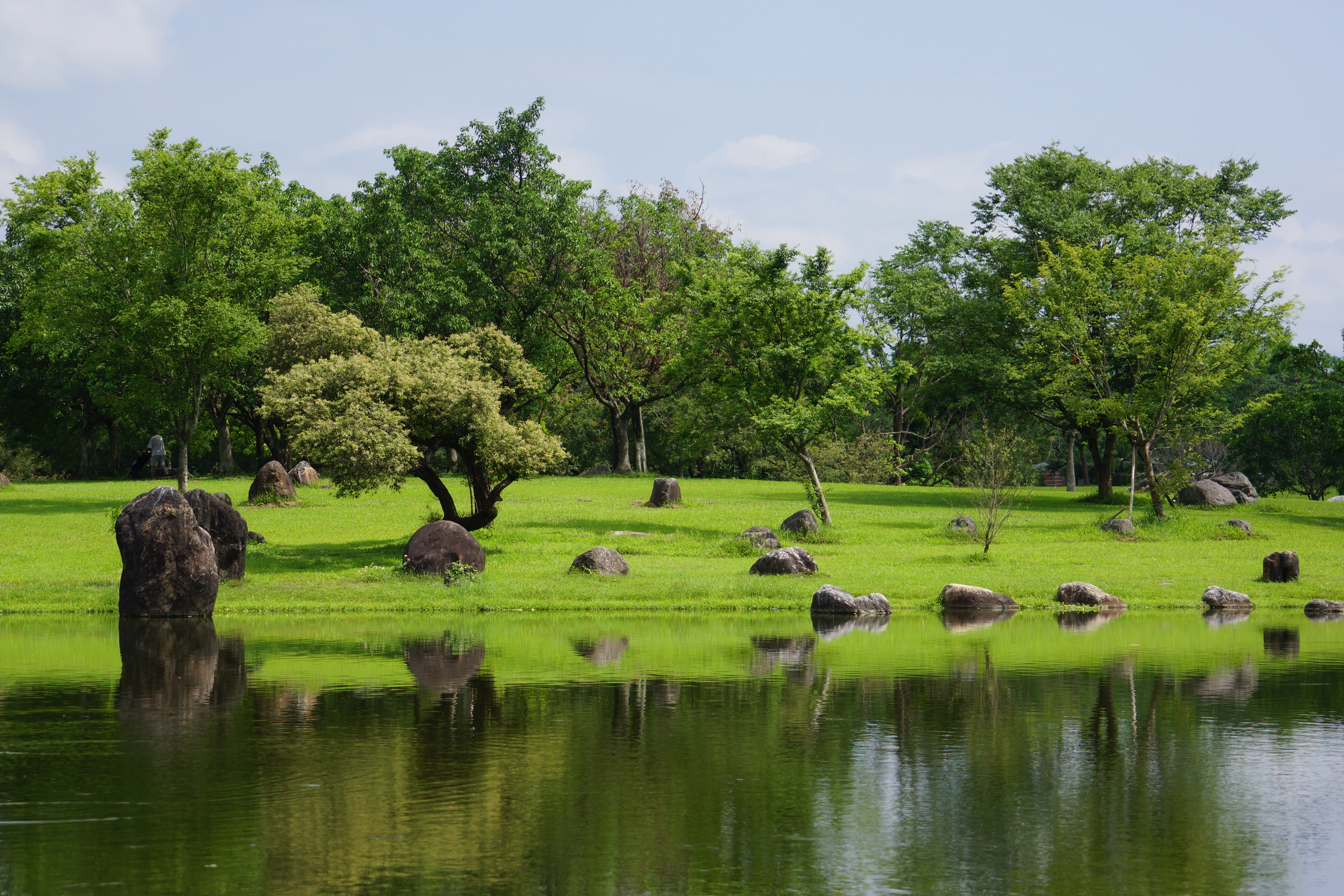
The scenes with the lawn where Li and Chen (Huang) sit side by side and have a heart-to-heart talk were filmed at Luodong Sports Park.

Filming for Someday Or One Day began officially on December 27, 2018, and concluded on May 10, 2019. After the script was completed, the crew discussed filming locations. As the drama is set in two separate time periods, the number of required locations doubled. The crew spent three months surveying hundreds of houses before finding one that was suitable for Chen Yun-ru's home. Director Huang Tien-jen sealed some corridors and made compartments to make it look smaller for convenience. Likewise, a long time was spent scouting the record store, but ultimately, Huang decided on the final location as soon as he saw the place. They remodeled and changed the interior furnishings to resemble a record store in the 90s. Huang wanted the props to be moved between scenes, as he felt it would be unrealistic, for example, if the shoes were always placed in the same spot, or for the calendar always stayed on the same page.

The design of the atrium that represents Yun-ru's mind had several proposals made by the art director, while Huang proposed building an atrium with a Möbius ring to symbolize the endlessness and the circulation of thoughts and resurfacing memories. He stated that the design was not finalized until one month before filming. The atrium scenes were filmed during the last three days of principal photography because it required a lot of material, and the static images on the walls of the atrium needed to be filmed earlier so that they could be included. Ma said that she decided to build a house with white curtains combined with the static images and dynamic projection and found a team of concept artists to orchestrate the scene. She emphasized that if the images projected on the walls were rendered by post-processing, the visual would be easily distorted, and Ko would have to rely on her imagination when acting out the scenes. She thought that if she went ahead with the decision to process the images later, she would be sacrificing a realistic performance from the actress.

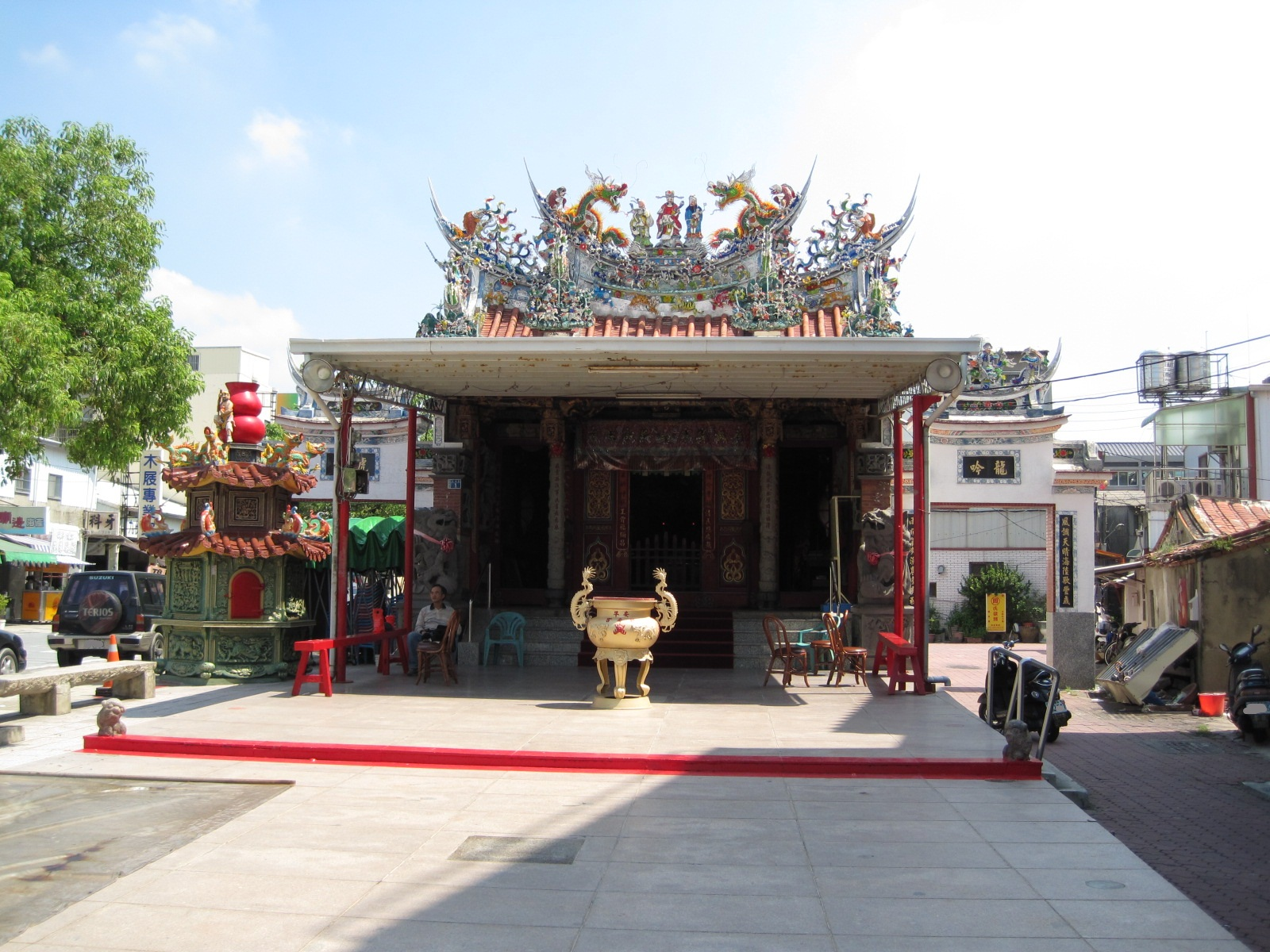
Miao-Shou-Gong, Anping was the place where Li bought white sugar rice pudding, and encountered little Huang.

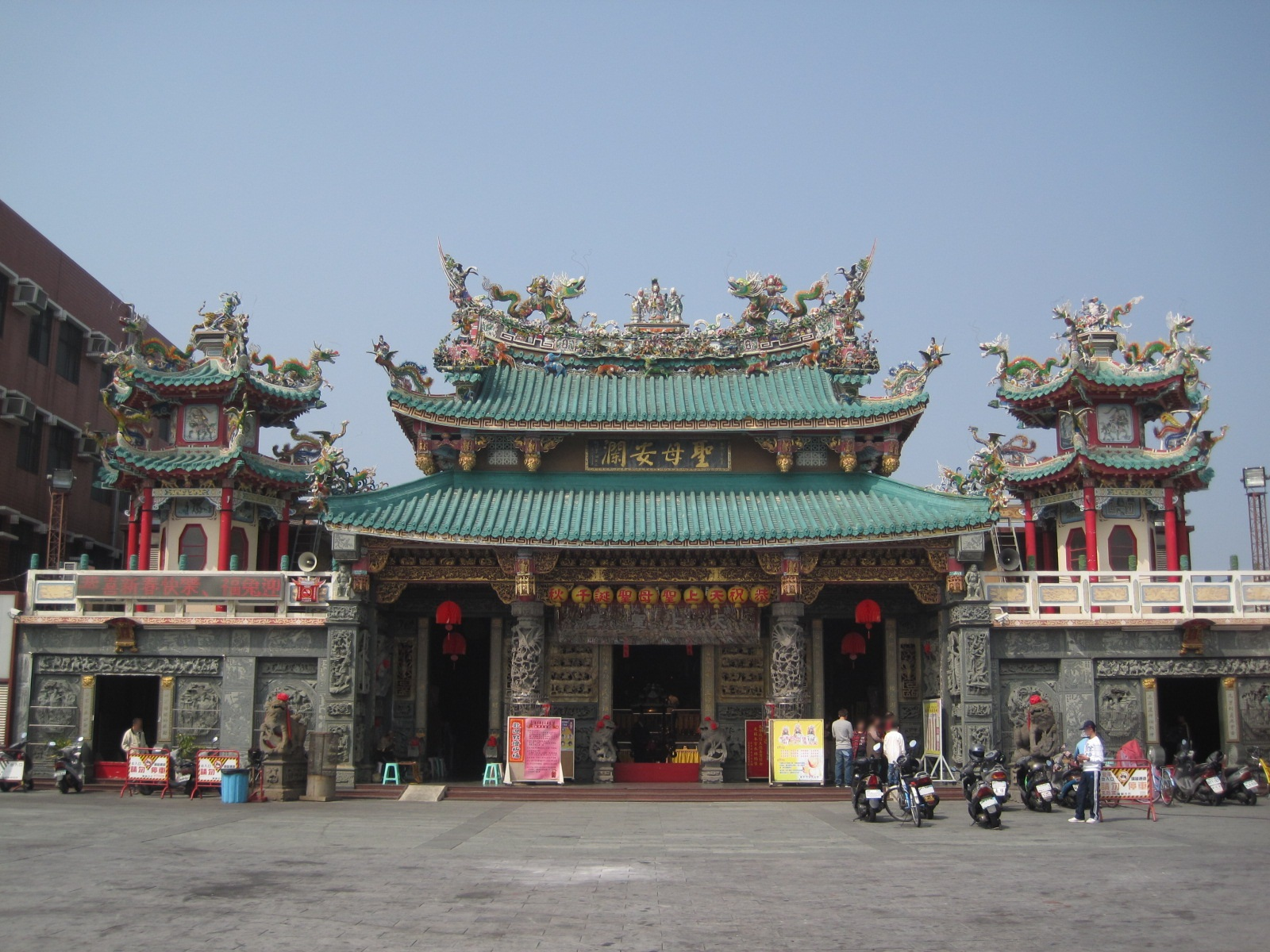
Tianhou Temple was the place where Li made candy with little Huang.

The drama was filmed in various cities and towns in Taiwan. The scenes of Huang Yu-Xuan as an office worker were mainly filmed in Taipei, while the characters’ campus life in 1998 was filmed in Tainan. During the press conference at the premiere, the actors revealed that in order to film the scenes from 1998, Ko, Hsu, Shih, and Yen lived together in Tainan for two months, which allowed them to continue to interact with each other every day after filming finished. Hsu said that while in Tainan the rapport and affection between the actors grew a lot. Ko said that she often felt weary while reading the script during that time, and she would walk around the neighborhood to relax and separate herself from Li and Mo, so it was a surprise to see them again when she opened the door. Shih described how everyone really became a family during the time they spent together filming in Tainan. After the drama was broadcast, Ko, Hsu, Shih and the crew members returned to Tainan to visit the filming locations. The scenes in the drama attracted many fans to also visit the filming locations.

=== Actors and roles ===
Ko Chia-yen, who won the Golden Bell Award for Best Actress in the 51st Golden Bell Awards for the drama Marry Me, or Not?, played both Huang Yu-xuan and Chen Yun-ru. Ma talked about the auditions conducted for the selection of the cast, and said that Ko's eyes were very clear and were not polluted by the environment even after working in the industry for so many years, which was needed for portraying the role of Chen in the drama. The screenwriters said that Ko was the archetype that they had in mind at the time of writing the script because she has the traits of both characters, as they are different from one another: Yu-xuan is lively and confident, while Yun-ru is introverted and quiet. Ko resonated with Chen's role because of her own experience: she said that she used to be very introverted during her school days, and always felt out of place, but interacted with people during work and turning to acting as an outlet for self-expression. She considered Someday Or One Day to be one of the hardest film projects she has worked on. After studying the role, she found herself in a melancholic state for a long time while filming. At home she was unable to prepare for her scenes, as she would cry once she read the script. She said that she did not have a sense of reality on the last day of filming but thought she could continue. Ko said it was rare to encounter a story and like it so much that she could completely devote herself to the performance.

Greg Hsu, nominated for the Golden Bell Award for Best Supporting Actor in the 52nd Golden Bell Awards for the drama Have You Ever Fallen in Love, Miss Jiang? (姜老師，妳談過戀愛嗎？), also played a dual role in the drama as both Wang Quan-sheng and Li Zi-wei. Ma said that she had seen him many years ago, just before he acted in Qseries (植劇場), and she thought that he had a special temperament that other actors do not have. Screenwriter Jian said Hsu was chosen because he said that he had felt Hsu's charm after working with him previously, and praised his portrayals of both roles. Because Hsu joined the project immediately after he filmed A Sun and Nowhere Man, he did not have a much time to prepare for the role. However, Jian thought that the most important thing was to conform to the mentality and state of the character. Hsu interpreted Wang's character as more feminine and delicate than compared to Li's bright and clear character. He referenced the movies he had watched as the template to build Wang's character, and said that Wang would treat himself as a girl, and therefore, his pace of walking would be slower and his manners would be more gentle.

Patrick Shih (施柏宇), who played the role of Mo Jun-jie, had gained attention with his role in HIStory 2 - Crossing the Line. Jian revealed at the screening that Shih passed the audition with a unanimous vote due to his outstanding performance. Ma also believed that his own characteristics were quite consistent with Jun-jie, who had to wear a hearing aid due to an ear disorder since childhood, and had been bullied. Shih revealed that he had just put his own experience into the role as he also had the experience of being bullied in his school days. He described Jun-jie as a blank piece of paper, who does not ask for return of the contribution to Yun-ru. Shih lacked experience in acting compared to the others, and put pressure on himself during filming. He felt as though he was dragging down his fellow actors and the crew, and while everyone was getting more and more into their character's state of mind, he felt he was stagnant, but was helped by Ko and Hsu. He also said that he had learned a lot of performing skills after filming this drama.

Kenny Yen (顏毓麟), who portrayed Xieh Zong-ru (謝宗儒) and Xie Zhi-qi (謝芝齊), also worked with Huang before in Life Plan A and B. In an interview, he expressed that he was able to interpret the role by relying on the Huang's guidance and the scene's circumstances. He also shared the most difficult part of filming was when he had a scene where he felt his neck was being pinched by an "invisible power", and it was stopping him to speak his lines. He said although he was scared at the moment, it helped him fit in with the emotions of the role, and build more tension in the drama. He had a breakthrough performance with role as the psychiatrist Zhi-qi, and the director praised him as the next Anthony Wong. Kenny Yen remembered that the director had said that it would have a dark side with this character.

Yen Yi-wen (嚴藝文), who won Best Actress in the 50th Golden Bell Awards for the drama Angel's Radio, played the role of Wu Ying-chan. Different from the image of a solemn mother in the past, she portrayed as a warm mother this time, who had suffered from an affair with her husband, and shouldered the burden of household expenses and running the karaoke business alone in order to raise her children. Yen Yi-wen explained that she has never had a child and could not fully understand the mentality of being a mother, but that she empathized with the sentiments she had while reading the script, and understood the messages her role was given to express, and tried to get it as close as possible. She participated in the filming of this drama while she was directing the drama The Making of an Ordinary Woman (俗女養成記) in Tainan.

Han Chang (張翰), who portrayed the younger brother of Ying-chan, was shortlisted for the Golden Bell Award for the Taiwanese movie Upstream and a student showcase named One Step Away (一步之遙), which was broadcast on public television.

He-Xuan Lin (林鶴軒) won Best Supporting Actor at the Taipei Film Awards for the film Secrets in The Hot Spring (切小金家的旅館). He plays the role of Si-yuan, Yun-ru's younger brother. Lin said that he felt great pressure to interpret the role of a secondary school student, and was worried about acting like a fool just because of his young age.

== Broadcast ==
On 23 February 2019, a press conference for the drama was held. A campus premiere was held on 27 September with a release of the drama's international trailer. The preview screening of the drama was held on 5 November, and 40 minutes of footage were broadcast. The press conference for the premiere was held on 15 November, and the 17-minute version of the trailer was released.

The live interactions with audiences were held on the drama's community website before and after each weekly episodes that broadcast on CTV. The finale was originally selected to be watched with the audience together with the actors in the cinema, but it was canceled due to the COVID-19 pandemic, and the live broadcast was changed to broadcast proceed on Taiwanese Yahoo!

On 15 April 2020, a post-credits scene concert was held by TME Live, named "Want to See You Someday Or One Day", with cast members Ko, Hsu and Shih participating on the webcast. Singers Shi Shi, Nine Chen and the band 831 performed their songs live. Wu Bai and China Blue were the last to perform, with many of their classic songs.

=== Terrestrial/cable/satellite ===
The following is a simplified schedule of the drama.

Broadcast channels	Country/Region	First Airing Date	Timeslot (GMT +8)
CTV	Republic of China (Taiwan)	November 17, 2019	Sunday 10:00–11:30 pm
Star Chinese Channel	Republic of China (Taiwan)	November 23, 2019	Saturday 10:00-11:30 pm
CTi Entertainment	Republic of China (Taiwan)	March 1, 2020	Sunday 10:00-11:30 pm
Astro Shuang Xing	Malaysia	February 17, 2020	Monday-Friday 7:00–8:00 pm
WeLike	Republic of Korea	April 18, 2020	Saturday-Sunday 10:00 pm
TVB J2	Hong Kong	May 28, 2020	Monday-Friday (except Wednesdays) 9:35–10:35 pm
Home Drama Channel	Japan	July 16, 2020	Thursday 1:00 am

=== Streaming services ===
The show was made available on iQIYI Taiwan, LINE TV, myVideo at 00:00 after CTV's first broadcast every Sunday; FOX+ and the Star Chinese Channel from every Saturday after CTV's first broadcast; new episodes became available on KKTV at 00:00 every Sunday starting from 24 November 2019, and Hami Video and CHT MOD were available every Sunday; myTV SUPER in Hong Kong listed the show on every Sunday from 18 November 2019. The C-POP TV from Japan started broadcasting on 6 December 2019, with each of the original 13 episodes being split into 26. iQIYI and Tencent Video from Mainland China listed the show on every Sunday, starting from 22 December at 23:00, with each episodes being reviewed by the Mainland media authority and it was split into 26 episodes with several scenes being deleted due to viewing guidelines.

Network	Country/Region	Airing Date	Timeslot (GMT +8)
iQIYI Taiwan	Republic of China (Taiwan)	18 November 2019	Monday 12:00 am
LINE TV	Republic of China (Taiwan)	18 November 2019	Monday 12:00 am
Taiwan Mobile myVideo	Republic of China (Taiwan)	18 November 2019	Monday 12:00 am
KKTV	Republic of China (Taiwan)	25 November 2019	Monday 12:00 am
Chunghwa Telecom Hami Video	Republic of China (Taiwan)	25 November 2019	Monday 12:00 am
Chunghwa MOD	Republic of China (Taiwan)	25 November 2019	Monday 12:00 am
FOX+	Republic of China (Taiwan)	23 November 2019	Saturday 10:00 pm
Disney+ (Star)	Republic of China (Taiwan)	12 November 2021	
iQIYI	China	22 December 2019	Sunday 11:00 pm
Tencent Video	China	22 December 2019	Sunday 11:00 pm
TVB myTV SUPER	Hong Kong	18 November 2019	Monday 12:00 am
WAVVE	Republic of Korea	18 April 2020	
Astro On Demand VOD	Malaysia	17 February 2020	
Viki	Selected countries in the Americas, Europe, Middle East, South Asia	18 November 2019	Monday 12:00 am
CatchPlay+	Singapore	8 January 2021	
CatchPlay+	Indonesia	29 January 2021	

=== Mainland China ===
The drama was repackaged in simplified Chinese when Mainland China streaming platforms began to air simultaneously with Taiwan after the fifth episode had been broadcast. At the same time, the pictures with the meaning of sovereignty from Taiwan, such as the passport, flag, identity card, police badge, and maps etc. were removed. Some scenes were deleted during the broadcast in mainland China, including the line "Was that your first day?" in one of the episode, which was deleted as it hinted on women's menstruation. The removal sparked dissatisfaction from audiences in mainland China, with them saying that "Do Chinese girls not have the right of a menstrual period?", and criticized the censorship system for "forbidding human nature".

=== Outflow of illegally pirated finale ===
On February 10, 2020, some online users found that there had several discussions openly with the un-broadcast endings were leaked by the forum of Mainland China. The next day, the production team issued a formal statement, saying that the leaked version of the finale was not the final version. In order to respect and protect the efforts of creators and cast members, they urged the audience to not watch the leaked version and to not distribute the pirated links. The actors also made public statements on this matter.

==== Easter eggs ====
On February 15, 2020, the main actors of the drama, including Ko, Hsu, Shih and Kenny Yen, attended the drama's book signing event. To everyone's surprise, they announced that they had exclusively filmed for the Easter egg. Ma expressed that they were upset and discouraged after receiving the news of pirated scenes being leaked out, and she called for a meeting of the whole crew on the day the statement was issued. She had originally planned to use another version of the ending, but the screenwriter and director had conceived and discussed using three versions in a short time, and filming officially started the next day. The clip was broadcast on CTV on 16 February. It was also aired on the Satellite TV Chinese Channel the next week. On the same day of it being broadcast on CTV, the episode was uploaded to their official social platform at midnight.

In addition to the easter eggs in the drama, Shi Shi and the band 831 released a song before the finale's broadcast. They combined both their songs into "Miss You 3000 Someday or One Day". They had finished recording, arranging, and editing the music video on the eve of the finale, and released it the next day.

== Soundtrack ==
Someday or One Day Original TV Soundtrack (OST)

Soundtrack album by various artists
- Released: 6 May 2020
- Genre: Mandopop
- Language: Mandarin
- Label: Rock Records

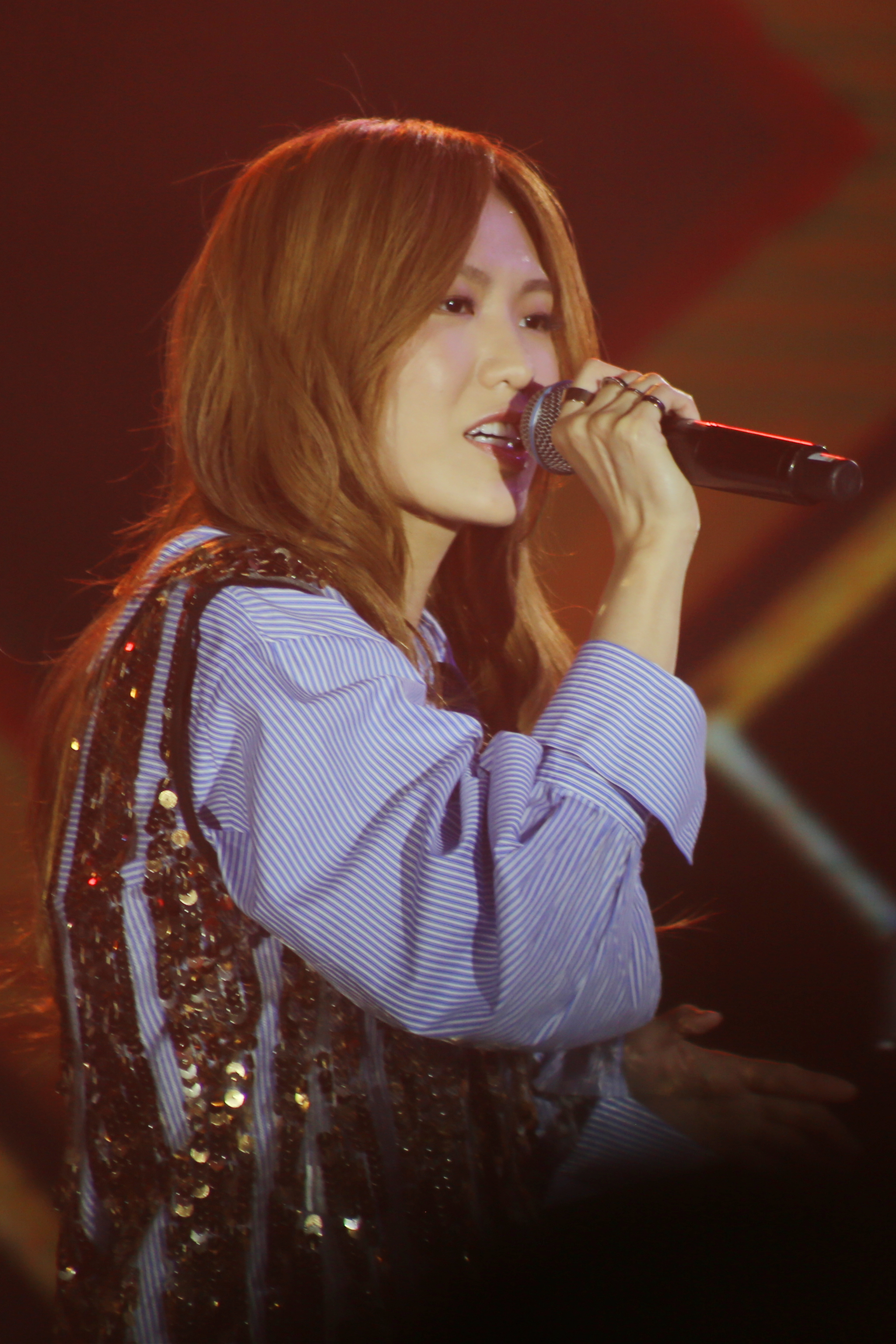
Sun Sheng Xi tailored the opening song "Someday or One Day" and the song "Come Away".

The Someday or One Day Original TV Soundtrack (OST) (想見你 電視原聲帶) was released on May 6, 2020, by Rock Records. The songs within are tailored to the drama and interspersed in the drama with many Chinese popular songs from the 1990s.

=== Track listing ===
CD 1: Songs
No.	Title	Lyrics	Music	Artists	Length
1.	"Last Dance" (interlude)	Wu Bai	Wu Bai	Wu Bai	4:31
2.	"Someday or One Day" (Opening song)	Christine Welch	Sun Sheng Xi	Sun Sheng Xi	4:12
3.	"Miss You 3000" (Ending song)	A-Pok@831	A-Pok@831	831	4:17
4.	"Is It true?" (interlude)	A-Yue	A-Yue	Karen Mok	5:21
5.	"See Your Voice" (interlude)	Nine Chen	Nine Chen	Nine Chen	4:15
6.	"Come Away" (interlude)	Sun Sheng Xi; Molly Lin	Sun Sheng Xi	Sun Sheng Xi	4:55
7.	"Secret" (interlude)	Chang Chen-yue	Chang Chen-yue	Chang Chen-yue	5:22
8.	"Embrace" (interlude)	Ashin	Ashin	Mayday	4:14
9.	"Someday" (interlude)	Zhan Yi-Jun; Huang Xuan	Huang Xuan	Huang Xuan	4:08
10.	"Will We Remember?" (interlude)	Li Yu-Huan	Li Yu-Huan	Faith Yang	5:15

CD 2: Incidental music
No.	Title	Length
1.	"Meet again with memories" (背著回憶再遇見)	3:20
2.	"We're together for a long long time in the dream" (夢裡面的我們在一起很久很久)	2:44
3.	"I'll go to find you if I can back to the past" (如果可以回到過去，我會去找你)	2:29
4.	"One white sugar rice pudding" (一份白糖粿)	2:48
5.	"The darkest star in the universe" (宇宙中最黯淡的那顆星)	3:10
6.	"Silent you and silent me behind" (無聲的妳，身後無聲的我)	2:53
7.	"I missed you so much as the first thought of wake up" (醒來的第一個念頭，就是我好想好想你)	1:59
8.	"Letting you to leave me was the only thing that I was regretted" (唯一後悔過的事，是讓你離開我身邊)	1:46
9.	"The third wish that cannot be told" (不說出口的第三個願望)	2:18
10.	"Someone who is living in my heart" (一直住在我心裡的某個人)	2:12
11.	"If I can saw you in my dream" (如果可以在夢裡見到你)	4:51
12.	"You would come back to me one day" (你會回到我身邊，總有一天)	4:41

== Plot outline summary ==
The story is divided between 1998 and 2019, where the multiple timelines are interspersed.

← Huang Yu-hsuan's soul crossed with Chen Yun-ru's body
Chen Yun-ru; Being attacked (1998) (aged 17)	Chen Yun-ru; Died (1999) (aged 18)	Huang Yu-hsuan; Studying in University (2010) (aged 18)	Huang Yu-hsuan; Being adult (2019) (aged 27)
→ Huang Yu-hsuan's soul travels back to 2019
Chen Yun-ru gets to know each other with Li Zi-wei and Mo Jun-jie (1998)	Mo Jun-jie went to jail (2000)	Huang Yu-hsuan in love with Wang Chuan-sheng (Li Zi-wei) (2012)	Huang Yu-hsuan and Li Zi-wei recognize each other (2019)
→ Li Zi-wei's soul crossed with Wang Chuan-sheng
Li Zi-wei; Car accident (2003) (aged 22)	Mo Jun-jie released from the prison in 2008; Mo Jun-jie suicide (aged 27)	Li Zi-wei; Died in 2019 (aged 38)
Wang Chuan-sheng; Jump off the sea in 2010 (aged 18)	Wang Chuan-sheng （Li Zi-wei） Aviation accident in 2017
← Li Zi-wei's soul travels back to 2003
Hsieh Tsung-ju rescue Chen Yun-ru; Hsieh Chih-chi attack Chen Yun-ru (1998)	Hsieh Chih-chi murdered Li Zi-wei (2019)
← Hsieh Chih-chi's soul travels to his brother Hsieh Tsung-ju's body
Hsieh Tsung-ju in coma at 1998 (aged 17)	Hsieh Tsung-ju in 1999 (aged 18)	Hsieh Chih-chi; Arrested in 2019 (aged 32)
→ Hsieh Chih-chi's soul travels back to 2019

== Reception ==
Episodes ratings
Episode	Air date	Average rating	Rank
1	17 Nov 2019	0.54	2
2	24 Nov 2019	0.57	2
3	1 Dec 2019	0.73	3
4	8 Dec 2019	0.83	3
5	15 Dec 2019	0.96	1
6	22 Dec 2019	1.14	1
7	29 Dec 2019	0.92	1
8	5 Jan 2020	1.25	1
9	12 Jan 2020	1.30	1
10	19 Jan 2020	1.55	1
Jan 26, 2020: "Along with the Gods: The Two Worlds" was broadcast during the time slot due to Chinese New Year holidays
11	2 Feb 2020	1.81	1
12	9 Feb 2020	1.83	1
13	16 Feb 2020	2.35	1
Average ratings			--

The first broadcast ratings of CTV ranks first among the four wireless channels in the same period. The finale was broadcast on 16 February 2020, with an average rating of 2.35 for people who over the age of 4, and a total of 73.5 million viewers nationwide, including the rating of 3.23 among audience aged 22 to 44, and female aged 25 to 39 was regarded as 4.65. The ratings had reached 2.46. Satellite TV Chinese Channel re-broadcast it on 22 February 2020, with a rating of 1.01. The rating of the premiere by the exclusive tidbits also ranked first in the same period, which was the highest-rated Taiwanese drama in the past 13 years. According to the TV channel's statistics, a total of 6.07 million people had watched the drama through TV channels across Taiwan since the premiere. On iQiyi Taiwan, it had surpassed 10 million clicks.

Someday or One Day was broadcast in more than 100 countries and translated into multiple languages. As of February 2020, there are more than 30 million views on the Taiwanese streaming platform; On Tencent and iQiyi, the audio-visual platform in mainland China, the number of views exceeded 700 million. Rights were sold to more than 100 countries and regions, and the program were translated into 12 languages, including English, French, Japanese, Korean, and Thai.

After the drama was broadcast in mainland China, it had received a good reputation and discussion rate, which scored high ratings on various media sites. There were more than 6 billion readings on the topic of Someday Or One Day on Sina Weibo. It had ranked the first at the list of keyword search on Naver after the drama had been aired on cable TV in South Korea.

Someday or One Day had several products launched by Shui-Ling Culture & Books, such as photobooks, novels, and handbooks. The response was enthusiastic among the original novels; the 5,000 pre-ordered copies of the first edition were sold out at launch, and another 5,000 copies were printed. The publisher revealed that the prepaid royalties of authorized novels, photobooks, and handbooks amounted to approximately NT$2 million. The limited hardcover edition of the Soundtrack was released by Rock Records; the paperback edition of the soundtrack was released simultaneously after the limited edition of 8,000 copies were sold out. The TV soundtrack had won first place of many rankings in Taiwan.

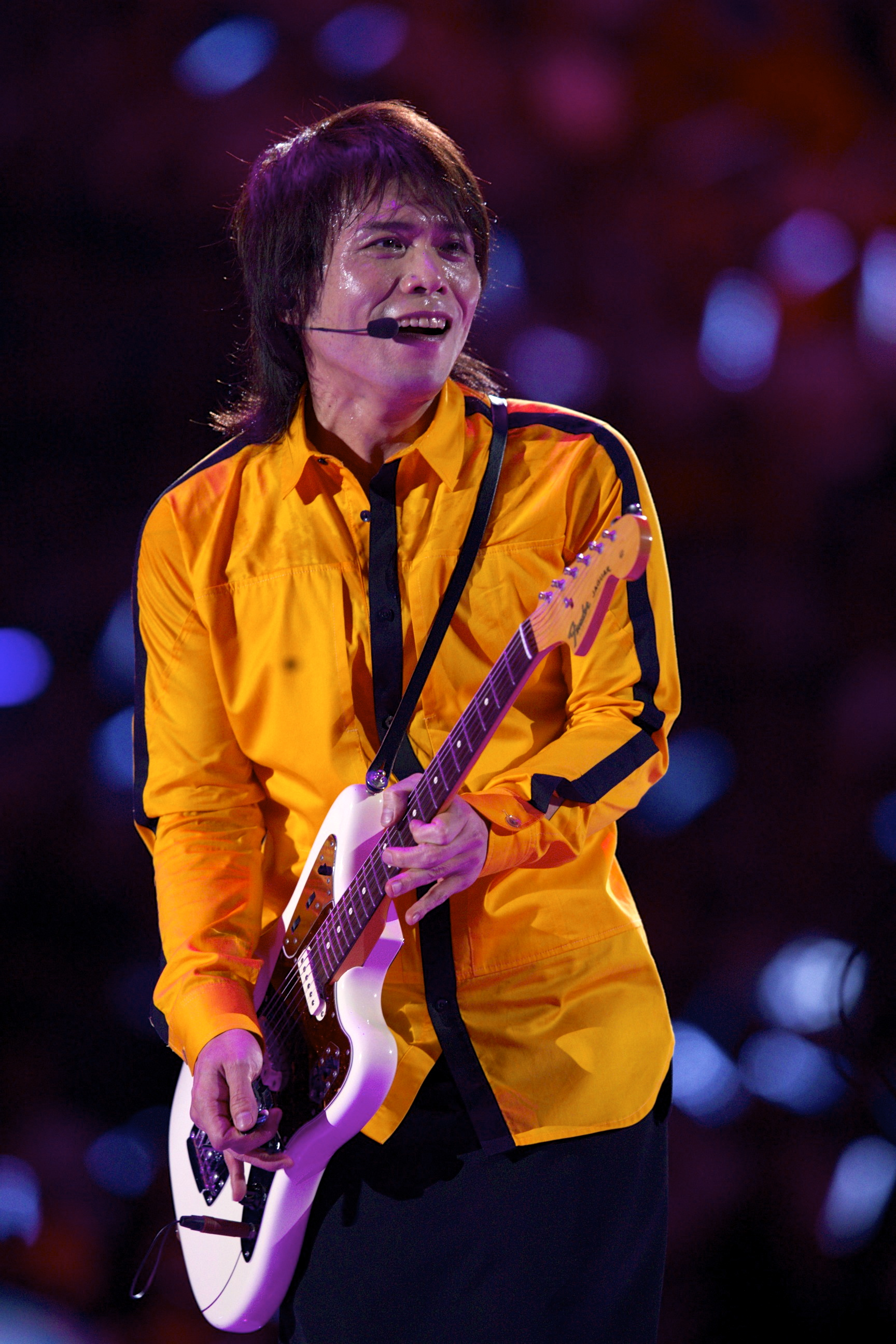
Wu Bai's song "Last Dance" which was released in 1996, became popular again after the drama was broadcast.

Wu Bai and China Blue's "Last Dance" was played throughout the episode, which became popular after the drama had been aired. After the finale was aired, the opening song "Someday or One Day" won the Western Singles Daily Chart in KKBox, and the ending song "Miss You 3000" was re-elected for the championship of the Chinese singles daily chart, and the song "Last Dance" also scored to the top five at the same time. Two months after the drama ended, the episode "Last Dance" became the first runner-up of the Chinese single track-list; "Someday or One Day" had won the champion of 10 consecutive days in the Western singles chart; and "Miss You 3000" won the KKBox's Chinese single track list, and as the winner for the sixth consecutive week in the Chinese single weekly chart. As of July 2020, "Miss You 3000" won the KKBOX Chinese annual cumulative list in the first half of the year, and the episode "See Your Voice", "One Day", and "Escape" were also on the list.

=== Ratings and effects ===
Audience rating
Media	Highest rating
Facebook	5/5
LINE TV	4.9/5
HamiVideo	4.8/5
Viki	9.5/10
Tencent	9.5/10
Douban	9.2/10
IMDb	8.6/10
iQIYI	8.3/10

Film critic Bird praised the drama after watching it. She believed that Someday Or One Day was the successor of The World Between Us, with high scores regardless of the aspects in terms of drama structure, overall completeness, and the performance of actors. She expressed that the plot was much deeper and wider than she had imagined; initially believing the drama as a whole was quite average and error-free under the accommodation of multiple elements and performance. She also praised the use of vocabulary between the two time periods.

Maple, another film critic, believed that the theme design was unique, as it combined fantasy, suspense and romance, instead of two elements put together, with an ongoing suspense puzzle inside the theme of romance. In regards to the actors' performances, he said that Hsu had a good tacit understanding with director Huang since they had previously worked in Attention, Love! In addition to his previous breakthrough performance in Nowhere Man, he believed that Hsu not only made a delicate distinction between Zi-wei and Quan-sheng, but also hid the complex memories and emotions in different periods of the character. Shih was known for his looks and cheerfulness in Crossover, another Taiwanese show, and Maple believed that his performance in this drama also impressed him, as Jun-jie was introverted and considerate, and that Shih's performance was much more complex compared to his previous works. Maple also praised actress Ko as Yu-xuan, and described the character as "a fish out of water". However, he believed that she got lightly laborious at the part of playing Yun-ru, but was integral for causing for the trio in high school throughout the drama, though this led to minor problems. Overall, Maple praised the drama.

The production team had broken through the formulation of Taiwanese dramas, and embarking on a new path through the new theme of crossing, and relying on the plot withstand scrutiny, it can even be said to set a milestone for the Taiwanese drama.

— ── Movie Search（電影神搜）

Drama critic Lin Mei-ling said that Someday Or One Day was second to none in terms of the theme of the story, the structure of the script, narrative method and the actors' performance. Lin said that there was no sense of discomfort for performing different ages in the drama, and thought that its success was credited to having a great script and excellent actors.

Media producer Ke Zhi-Yuan praised both screenwriters Jian and Lin. He praised Ko for the interpretation of multiple personalities of two roles, and that Hsu acted with vigor and energy. Finally, Ke said that Shih's appearance was pleasing, and it was a surprise and a bright spot in the drama.

== Awards and nominations ==
Year	Ceremony	Category	Nominee	Result
2020	55th Golden Bell Awards	Best Television Series	Someday or One Day	Won
2020	55th Golden Bell Awards	Best Leading Actor in a Television Series	Greg Han	Nominated
2020	55th Golden Bell Awards	Best Leading Actress in a Television Series	Ko Chia-yen	Won
2020	55th Golden Bell Awards	Best Directing for a Television Series	Huang Tien-jen	Nominated
2020	55th Golden Bell Awards	Best Writing for a Television Series	Jian Qi-Feng, Lin Xin-Hui	Won
2020	55th Golden Bell Awards	Creative Award for a Drama Series	Someday or One Day	Won
2020	2nd Asian Contents Awards	Best Creative	Someday or One Day	Nominated
2020	2nd Asian Contents Awards	Best Asian Drama	Someday or One Day	Nominated
2020	Asian Academy Creative Awards 2020	Best Original Screenplay	Chi-Feng Chien, Hsin-Huei Lin	Nominated
2020	25th Asian Television Awards	Best Direction (Fiction)	Huang Tien-Jen	Nominated
2020	25th Asian Television Awards	Best Original Screenplay	Chien Chi-Feng, Lin Hsin-Huei	Nominated
2020	25th Asian Television Awards	Best Theme Song	"Someday or One Day" by Shi Shi	Won
2020	2020 Tencent Video All Star Awards	Promising Actor of the Year	Greg Han	Won

== Adaptation ==
A South Korean adaptation titled A Time Called You (Korean: 너의 시간 속으로; lit. 'To Your Time'), produced by Npio Entertainment and Lian Contents. The series, written by Choi Hyo-bi, directed by Kim Jin-won, starring Ahn Hyo-seop, Jeon Yeo-been and Kang Hoon was released exclusively on Netflix on September 8, 2023.
