= Greg Han (album) =

Studio album by Greg Han
- Released: December 7, 2021
- Recorded: 2020–2021
- Studios: Perfect Sound (Taipei); Lights Up (Taipei); Mega Force (New Taipei); BB Road; 112F (Taipei)
- Genres: Pop; R&B
- Length: 38:02
- Language: Mandarin
- Label: Pourquoi Pas
- Producers: George Chen; Mickey Lin; Howe Chen; Penny Tai; The crane; Déjà Fu

Singles from Greg Han
- 1. "Yesterday No More" Released: October 27, 2020; 2. "Soufflé" Released: November 5, 2021; 3. "I Couldn't Care Less" Released: November 19, 2021; 4. "One Day at a Time" Released: December 7, 2021; 5. "Good Night, Good Night" Released: December 7, 2021

Greg Han is the self-titled debut studio album by Taiwanese singer Greg Han. It was released on December 7, 2021, through Pourquoi Pas Music.

== Release and promotion ==
Greg Han was released on December 7, 2021, to digital music. The CD was released on December 17, 2021.

=== Singles ===
"Yesterday No More", Greg Han's debut single, was released on October 27, 2020. Its music video premiered on November 17, 2020. It was directed by DJ Chen and stars Ivy Yin, Greg Han and Hsu Huachien.

"Soufflé" was released as the second single on November 5, 2021, along with its music video, directed by Han-soul.

The third single, "I Couldn't Care Less", was released on November 19, 2021. Its music video was released on November 23, directed by Kidding Hsu.

The fourth single, "One Day at a Time", was released alongside the album on December 7, 2021. The song's music video premiered on the same day at noon. It was directed by Remii Huang and stars Greg Han, Bai Runyi and Derek Chang.

The fifth single, "Good Night, Good Night", featuring Joanna Wang, received a music video on December 29, 2021, directed by Kao Chengkai. The song received Top 50 Singles of the Year at the 15th Freshmusic Awards.

== Accolades ==
Awards and nominations for Greg Han, the album and its songs in 2022
Award	Category	Result	Ref.
Canadian Chinese Pop Music Awards	Best New Artist	Won	
Hito Music Awards	Favorite New Artist	Won	
Freshmusic Awards	Top 50 Singles of the Year "Good Night, Good Night"	Won	
Freshmusic Awards	Best New Artist	Nominated	
Freshmusic Awards	Top 10 Albums of the Year	Nominated	
Golden Melody Awards	Best New Artist	Nominated	

== Track listing ==
Credits adapted from the album's liner notes.

No.	Title	Writer(s)	Producer(s)	Length
1.	"Zone out"	Dean Wang; Huang Tzuyuan	George Chen	3:25
2.	"Good Night, Good Night" (featuring Joanna Wang)	Dean Wang; Fran	Mickey Lin	4:02
3.	"I Couldn't Care Less"	Subyub Lee; JerryC; HUSH	George Chen	3:30
4.	"Soufflé"	Chun Yukcheung; RAZOR Chiang	George Chen	3:10
5.	"Loner"	Wu Jiahui; David Ke	Howe Chen	4:14
6.	"One Day at a Time"	Chen Yuxi; Achau Hsu	George Chen	4:45
7.	"Figure You out"	William Wei; Tim Lin	George Chen	3:51
8.	"Yesterday No More"	Penny Tai	Penny Tai	4:30
9.	"Our Day in the Zoo"	Vj Voon; Yuen Chen	The crane; Howe Chen	3:00
10.	"Chill out"	Evan Yo; Mickey Lin; Chang Wu	Mickey Lin; Déjà Fu	3:31
Total length:				38:02

== Personnel ==
Credits adapted from the album's liner notes.

Musicians

- LINION – vocal production (1)
- YELLOW – vocal production (2, 4), backing vocals (2)
- George Chen – vocal production (3, 6)
- William Wei – vocal production (7)
- Huang Shaoyong – arrangement (1)
- Chung Weiyu – arrangement (2)
- JerryC – arrangement (3), guitar (3)
- Peter Wang – arrangement (4, 7)
- Dato Chang – arrangement (5, 6), piano (5), synthesizer (5, 6), strings arrangement (5), strings production (6)
- Keke Ke – arrangement (7)
- Sun Linchien – arrangement (7), strings arrangement (7)
- Martin Tang – arrangement (8)
- The crane – arrangement (9), synthesizer (9), piano (9), drums (9), backing vocals arrangement (9), backing vocals 9)
- Ninewoods Lee – arrangement (10)
- Déjà Fu – arrangement (10)
- Eddie Hsu – strings production (7)
- Yaya Wu – executive production (8), backing vocals arrangement (8)
- Lu Kangyu – guitar (3)
- Wico Weng – guitar (4)
- Sugar Cube – guitar (4)
- Theo Chou – guitar (5)
- Chen Yuxi – guitar (6)
- Yin Yang – guitar (7)
- Arthur Shen – guitar (7)
- Howe Chen – guitar (9)
- Jack Ko – bass (3), synthesizer (6)
- Vincent Chen – bass (7)
- Peter Lai – drums (3, 7)
- Chiang Shangchien – drums (5)
- Giant Art – quartet (8)
- Shuon Tsai – violin (6)
- Nala Huang – violin (6)
- Edric Chang – violin (7)
- Leta Chin – violin (7)
- Boy Chen – violin (7)
- Lu Szuchien – violin (7)
- Karla Huang – violin (7)
- Victor Yen – violin (7)
- Evelyn Chang – violin (8)
- Li Shaohsuan – violin (8)
- Weapon Gan – viola (6)
- Yuan Yiching – viola (7)
- Kelly Chen – viola (7)
- Wu Huichi – viola (8)
- Hang Liu – cello (6)
- Yoyo Wu – cello (7)
- Chiang Yuting – cello (7)
- Huang Yingyuan – cello (8)
- Greg Han – lead vocals (all tracks), backing vocals (2, 10)
- Joanna Wang – featured artist (2), vocals (2), backing vocals (2)
- Brandy Tien – backing vocals arrangement (1, 7), backing vocals (1, 7)
- HUSH – backing vocals arrangement (3), backing vocals (3)
- Osean – backing vocals arrangement (4), backing vocals (4)
- A'da Liang – backing vocals arrangement (6), backing vocals (6)
- Eddie Huang – backing vocals arrangement (8), backing vocals (8)
- LÜCY – backing vocals (10)
- LEE – backing vocals (10)

Technical

- Chen Yilin – recording (1, 3, 4, 6, 7)
- AJ Chen – recording (2, 10), mixing (1)
- Link Shan – recording (3, 6, 7)
- Thomas Chuang – recording (4), mixing (4)
- Yeh Yuhsuan – recording (5, 9)
- Zen Chien – recording (5)
- Lin Shangpo – recording (7)
- Chief Wang – recording (8)
- SHENB – recording (9), mixing (5), assistant production (5, 9)
- Yu Shihcheng – assistant record engineering (6)
- Lin Yuchien – assistant record engineering (8)
- Tseng Donghong – assistant record engineering (8)
- Peng Tengwei – assistant record engineering (8)
- Ziya Huang – mixing (2, 9, 10)
- Simon Li – mixing (3, 7)
- Lin Chengchung – mixing (6)
- Jerry Lin – mixing (8)
- Sun Chungshu – mastering (3, 4, 6, 8)
- Gorden – assistant production (2, 10)

== Charts ==
The following charts are for albums sold at each record shops or online music stores in Taiwan.

=== Weekly charts ===
Chart (2021)	Peak Position
Taiwanese Albums (Chia Chia)	4
Taiwanese Albums (Eslite)	9
Taiwanese Albums (Five Music)	1
Taiwanese Albums (Kuang Nan)	4
Taiwanese Albums (Pok'elai)	1

=== Year-end charts ===
Chart (2021)	Position
Taiwanese Albums (Chia Chia)	12
Taiwanese Albums (Five Music)	12
Taiwanese Albums (Pok'elai)	10
