= Greg Hsu =

Taiwanese actor and singer (born 1990)

- 許光漢
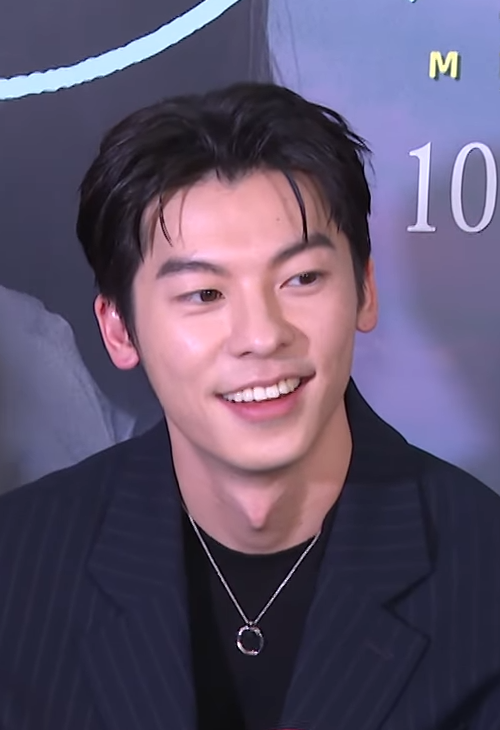
- Hsu in 2025
- Born: Hsu Kuang-han; October 31, 1990 (age 36); Taiwan
- Other name: Greg Han
- Education: Chinese Culture University (BS)
- Occupations: Actor; singer
- Years active: 2013–present
- Musical career
- Genres: Pop; R&B
- Instrument: Vocals
- Labels: Seed; Pourquoi Pas

Chinese name
- Traditional Chinese: 許光漢
- Simplified Chinese: 许光汉
Transcriptions
Standard Mandarin
- Hanyu Pinyin: Xǔ Guānghàn
- Bopomofo: ㄒㄩˇ ㄍㄨㄤ ㄏㄢˋ
Southern Min
- Hokkien POJ: Khó͘ Kong-hàn

Hsu Kuang-han (Chinese: 許光漢; pinyin: Xǔ Guānghàn; Pe̍h-ōe-jī: Khó͘ Kong-hàn; born October 31, 1990) (Note: Also known as Greg Hsu and Greg Han.) is a Taiwanese actor and singer. He was nominated for Golden Bell Awards twice for his roles in the television series Have You ever Fallen in Love, Miss Jiang? (2016) and Someday or One Day (2019–2020). He also appeared in the television series Love of Sandstorm (2016) and Nowhere Man (2019), as well as the films A Sun (2019) and My Love (2021). In 2020, he entered the Forbes China Celebrity 100 list for the first time, ranking 69th.

Hsu released his debut single "Yesterday No More" in 2020 and the next year he released his self-titled debut studio album. In 2022, he was nominated for Best New Artist at the 33rd Golden Melody Awards.

== Early life and education ==
Hsu was born in Taiwan on October 31, 1990. His father was a soldier in the Republic of China Army. He was named "Kuang" (光) as it was his family's generation name.

As a child, Hsu suffered from asthma and, at the encouragement of his mother, participated in national table tennis tournaments. At age 13, he appeared as a young male lead in Jay Chou's music video for "Class 3-2". He attended Zhongzheng Elementary School in New Taipei City, then went to school in Taipei, where he graduated from Taipei Municipal Jingmei National Middle School and Taipei Municipal Fuxing Senior High School. He was the lead vocalist for his high school's music club.

After high school, Hsu attended Chinese Culture University, where he was classmates with Hong Kong actor Sunny Sun (孙阳). He studied mass communications there and graduated with a degree in information management. As an undergraduate, he began working as a male model and made appearances in modeling shows.

== Career ==
In 2013, Hsu made his television debut in the Malaysian drama series Dive into Love. In 2015, he studied acting at Q Place, a drama academy established by director Wang Shaudi. He followed this appearing in well-received series Love of Sandstorm and Have You ever Fallen in Love, Miss Jiang? in which he was nominated Best Supporting Actor at the 52nd Golden Bell Awards. Hsu also made performances in Netflix's Nowhere Man and Oscar short-listed A Sun. In 2019, he starred as leading actor in hit series Someday Or One Day. The popular series got him nominated for Best Leading Actor at the 55th Golden Bell Awards, and made him now one of the most sought-after young actors in Asia. In 2020, he released the music single "Yesterday No More". The song immediately landed No. 1 on KKBox charts in Taiwan, Hong Kong, Singapore and Malaysia.

== Endorsements ==
On July 14, 2022, Fendi announced that Hsu became the brand's ambassador.

== Personal life ==
On August 21, 2024, Hsu announced on social media that he had joined the Taiwanese military to fulfill his 1 year mandatory service requirements. He had enlisted as a military trainee at Cheng-gong Ridge Camp in Taichung, Taiwan, on August 20, and began active service on September 13, 2024, at Zhongxhing New Village in Nantou City, Taiwan. He was discharged on August 6, 2025.

== Filmography ==
=== Film ===
| † | Denotes films that have not yet been released |

| Year | Title | Role | Notes | Ref. |
|---|---|---|---|---|
| 2018 | Back to the Good Times | Night market guest | Cameo | |
| 2019 | A Sun | Chen Jianhao (A-hao) | | |
| 2021 | My Love | Zhou Xiaoqi | | |
| 2022 | Someday or One Day | Li Ziwei / Wang Quansheng | Film adaptation of the 2019 series | |
| 2023 | Marry My Dead Body | Wu Ming-han | | |
| 2024 | Pigsy | Bajie | Voice | |
| 2024 | 18×2 Beyond Youthful Days | Jimmy | Taiwanese-Japanese film | |

=== Television ===
| Year | Title | Role | Notes | Ref. |
|---|---|---|---|---|
| 2013 | Dive into Love | Chen Minhao | 20 episodes | |
| 2013 | A Complete Life | Wu Yiheng's classmate | Bit part, Television film | |
| 2016 | Love of Sandstorm | Zhuang Haoyang | 7 episodes | |
| 2016 | Have You ever Fallen in Love, Miss Jiang? | Chen Weizheng | 6 episodes | |
| 2017 | My Dear Boy | Nigulu | 20 episodes | |
| 2017 | Attention, Love! | Jin Yubin | 15 episodes | |
| 2017 | Art in Love | Qin Lang | 39 episodes | |
| 2017 | Inference Notes | Lin Xiao | Guest (episode 10) | |
| 2018 | Meet Me @1006 | Zhou Dajun | 26 episodes | |
| 2018 | Hijra in between | Wen Tangsheng | Television film | |
| 2019 | Nowhere Man | Lin Jizi / Wang Xiaoqiu | 8 episodes | |
| 2019 | Someday or One Day | Li Ziwei / Wang Quansheng | 13 episodes | |
| 2020 | Road: Taiwan Express | Kevin | Guest (episode 3) | |
| 2021 | Rainless Love in a Godless Land | Kakarayan | Guest (episode 10 and 11) | |
| 2021 | Light the Night | Yuen's classmate | Cameo (episode 3) | |
| 2024 | No Way Out: The Roulette | Mr. Smile | Korean drama | |
| 2024 | GG Precinct | Wu Ming-han | 6 episodes | |

=== Music videos ===
| Year | Title | Artist |
|---|---|---|
| 2003 | "Class 3-2" | Jay Chou |
| 2012 | "Express My Love" | Kuo Shu-yao |
| 2013 | "How could You Sleep at Ease" | Penny Tai |
| 2014 | "Forgot to Go Back" | Chou Chuan-huing |
| 2017 | "Losing Voice" | Kenji Wu |
| 2019 | "Vanilla Villa" | Sunset Rollercoaster |
| 2020 | "Let it..." | Hebe Tien |

== Discography ==
Studio album

- Greg Han (2021)

== Accolades ==
| Year | Award | Category | Work | Result | Ref. |
|---|---|---|---|---|---|
| 2017 | Golden Bell Awards | Best Supporting Actor in a Television Series | Have You Ever Fallen in Love, Miss Jiang? | Nominated | |
| 2020 | Youth Film Handbook Award | Best Supporting Actor | A Sun | Nominated | |
| 2020 | Golden Bell Awards | Best Leading Actor in a Television Series | Someday Or One Day | Nominated | |
| 2020 | iQIYI Scream Night | Best Screen Couple of the Year (shared with Alice Ko) | Someday or One Day | Won | |
| 2020 | Esquire Man at His Best Awards | Annual Artist of Hong Kong and Taiwan | Someday or One Day | Won | |
| 2020 | Tencent Video All Star Awards | Promising Actor of the Year | Someday or One Day | Won | |
| 2020 | Golden Blossom Internet Film and Television Awards | Popular Actor of the Year | Someday or One Day | Won | |
| 2021 | Huading Awards | Best New Actor | My Love | Nominated | |
| 2022 | Canadian Chinese Pop Music Awards | Best New Artist | Greg Han (album) | Won | |
| 2022 | Hito Music Awards | Favorite New Artist | Greg Han (album) | Won | |
| 2022 | Freshmusic Awards | Top 50 Singles of the Year | "Good Night, Good Night" | Won | |
| 2022 | Freshmusic Awards | Top 10 Albums of the Year | Greg Han (album) | Nominated | |
| 2022 | Freshmusic Awards | Best New Artist | Greg Han (album) | Nominated | |
| 2022 | Golden Melody Awards | Best New Artist | Greg Han (album) | Nominated | |
| 2023 | Golden Horse Awards | Best Leading Actor | Marry My Dead Body | Nominated | |
