= A Time Called You =

2023 South Korean television series

- Promotional poster
- Hangul: 너의 시간 속으로
- Hanja: 너의 時間 속으로
- Lit.: Into Your Time
- RR: Neoui sigan sogeuro
- MR: Nŏŭi sigan sogŭro
- Genre: Time travel; Mystery; Romance
- Based on: Someday or One Day by Huang Tien-jen
- Written by: Choi Hyo-bi
- Directed by: Kim Jin-won
- Starring: Ahn Hyo-seop; Jeon Yeo-been; Kang Hoon
- Music by: Choi In-hee
- Country of origin: South Korea
- Original language: Korean
- No. of episodes: 12

Production
- Running time: 46–76 minutes
- Production companies: Npio Entertainment; Lian Contents; Studio Flow

Original release
- Network: Netflix
- Release: September 8, 2023

Related
- Someday or One Day (Taiwan)

A Time Called You (Korean: 너의 시간 속으로) is a 2023 South Korean time travel mystery romance television series written by Choi Hyo-bi, directed by Kim Jin-won, and starring Ahn Hyo-seop, Jeon Yeo-been, and Kang Hoon. Based on the Taiwanese television series Someday or One Day. It was released on Netflix on September 8, 2023.

== Synopsis ==
A Time Called You is a story about Jun-hee, who is still grieving the loss of her boyfriend Yeon-jun in the year 2023, a year after his passing. She somehow travels back in time to 1998 and wakes up inhabiting the body of a different person, 18-year-old Min-ju. As she navigates this new reality, she meets Si-heon, who bears an uncanny resemblance to her deceased boyfriend, adding to the emotional complexity of her journey.

== Cast ==
=== Main ===
- Ahn Hyo-seop as Koo Yeon-jun / Nam Si-heon

Jun-hee's boyfriend and a boy from 1998 who resembles him.

- Jeon Yeo-been as Han Jun-hee / Kwon Min-ju

Yeon-jun's girlfriend, who still mourns over his death and the girl whose body she ends up in after traveling back in time.

- Kang Hoon as Jung In-gyu

Si-heon's best friend, who has a crush on Min-ju.

=== Supporting ===
==== Min-ju's family ====
- Park Hyuk-kwon as Bae Chi-won, Min-ju's uncle
- Jang Hye-jin as Bae Mi-yeong, Min-ju's mother
- Lee Min-goo as Kwon Do-hun, Min-ju's brother
- Sung Ki-yoon as Kwon Sang-jo, Min-ju's father

==== People around Jun-hee ====
- Seo Ye-hwa as Seo Na-eun
- Min Jin-woong as Oh Chan-yeong/ Oh Chan-hui (1998)
- Park Ki-woong as Choi Myung-il
- Kim Deok-ju as Han Jun-hee's grandmother
- Lee Ji-ha as Soo-kyung
- Do Sang-woo as Park Do-hyeon
- Yoon Sang-jeong as Hye-mi

=== Special appearance ===
- Rowoon as Tae-ha (Ep. 8)

== Production ==
=== Development ===
On February 22, 2021, Entertainment agency Npio Entertainment and Lian Contents announced that Taiwan Fox Network Group had completed the contract for the remake rights to the popular Taiwanese drama Someday or One Day and the Korean version would be produced in earnest.

=== Casting ===
In December 2021, it was reported that Jeon Yeo-been and Ahn Hyo-seop had received an offer to play the lead roles in the series and that they were still reviewing the offer. In February 2022, it was reported that Kang Hoon was considering the offer to appear in the series. On March 31, 2022, Netflix confirmed the production of the series along with the casting of Ahn, Jeon and Kang.

=== Filming ===
Filming began in April 2022.

== Reception ==
=== Critical response ===
On the review aggregator website Rotten Tomatoes, 57% of 7 critics' reviews are positive, with an average rating of 7.2/10.

=== Listicles ===
Name of publisher, year listed, name of listicle, and placement
Publisher	Year	Listicle	Placement	Ref.
Entertainment Weekly	2025	The 21 best Korean shows on Netflix to watch now	Top 21	
