= Marry Me, or Not? =

2015 Taiwanese television series

- Promotional poster
- 必娶女人
- Genre: Romantic comedy
- Created by: Eastern Television
- Written by: Jian Qi Feng (簡奇峰); Lin Xin Hui (林欣慧)
- Directed by: Yu Zhong Zhong (于中中)
- Starring: Roy Chiu; Ko Chia-yen; Joanne Tseng; Harry Chang
- Opening theme: Love’s Forever by Real feat. Joanne Tseng
- Ending theme: Linger On by Yoga Lin
- Country of origin: Republic of China (Taiwan)
- Original language: Mandarin
- No. of seasons: 1
- No. of episodes: 15

Production
- Executive producers: Lai Xiu Zhen (賴秀貞); Tong Han Xuan (童瀚萱); Lin You Jie (林友潔)
- Producers: Jason Hsueh; Chen Zhi Han (陳芷涵); Phoebe Ma (麻怡婷)
- Production locations: Taiwan, South Korea
- Running time: 90 minutes
- Production companies: Three Phoenixes Production Co. Ltd. (三鳳製作); Eastern Television

Original release
- Network: CTV; ETTV
- Release: 1 November 2015 – 14 February 2016

Related
- The Day I Lost U; Nie Xiaoqian

Marry Me, or Not? (Chinese: 必娶女人; pinyin: bì qǔ nǚ rén) is a 2015 Taiwanese romantic comedy television series created and produced by Eastern Television. Starring Roy Chiu, Ko Chia-yen, Joanne Tseng and Harry Chang, filming began on March 12, 2015 and wrapped up on June 14, 2015. The 15-episode series aired on CTV every Sunday at 10:00-11:30 pm from November 1, 2015 to February 14, 2016.

== Cast ==
=== Main cast ===
- Roy Chiu as Hao Meng 郝萌 （Justin）
- Ko Chia-yen as Cai Huan Zhen 蔡環真 （Vivienne）
- Joanne Tseng as Hao Sheng Nan 郝勝男
- Harry Chang as Jiang Qian Yao 江前躍

=== Supporting cast ===
- Grace Ko as Xia Yu He 夏羽荷
- Wang Dao-Nan as Hao Yi Sheng 郝怡生
- Akira Chen as Cai Yong Li 蔡宏立
- Ke Shu-qin as Wang Yue E 王月娥
- Danny Liang as Lin Shu Hong 林書鴻
- Peggy Yang as Xin Xian 心嫻
- Yu Yue Ru (余月如) as Na Na 娜娜
- Li Pei Yu (李霈瑜) as Wen Jia 雯嘉
- Li Chung Lin as Ah Xin 阿信
- Daniel Chen as Cui Da Zui 崔大嘴
- Louis Liu (李霈瑜) as Meng Fu 孟甫
- Zhang Bo Sheng (張博盛) as Guai Shou 怪獸
- Heaven Hai (海裕芬) as Assistant manager

=== Cameo ===
- Mickey Huang as Manager Huang
- Chung Hsin-ling as Xiao Dai 小黛
- Kimi Hsia as Hsu Ching-ju
- Li Ying (李穎) as Sammy
- Josie Leung as Ms. Yang
- Chung Hsin-yu (莎莎) as Fortune teller's customer
- Xu Li Yun (徐麗雲) as Hao Grandma
- Chen Bolin as Li Da Lun 李大倫
- Ma Jun Lin (馬俊麟) as Veterinarian
- Tseng Shi (曾實) as Sun Fu Guo 孫副國
- Lance Yu as Mr. Xiao
- Esther Wu as Xiao Min 小敏
- Paul Hsu as Policemen
- Wu Zheng Xun (吳政勳) as Ah B 阿B
- Mirza Atif Ali Baig as Huan Zhen's ex-boyfriend
- Ha Xiao Yuan (哈孝遠) as Huan Zhen's ex-boyfriend
- Lu Yan Ze (盧彥澤) as Huan Zhen's ex-boyfriend
- Ti Chih-Chieh as CEO Jin

== Soundtrack ==
Marry Me or Not? Original TV Soundtrack (OST)

Soundtrack album by Various artists
- Released: 27 November 2015
- Genre: Mandopop
- Language: Mandarin
- Label: HIM International Music Inc.

Marry Me or Not? Original TV Soundtrack (OST) (必娶女人 電視原聲帶) was released on November 27, 2015 by various artists under HIM International Music Inc. It contains 10 tracks total. The opening theme is track 1 "Love’s Forever" by Real (F.I.R.) feat. Joanne Tseng, while the closing theme is track 2 "Linger On" by Yoga Lin.

=== Track listing ===
No.	Title	Singer(s)	Length
1.	"Love’s Forever" (見招拆招)	Real (F.I.R.) feat. Joanne Tseng	4:23
2.	"Linger On" (兜圈)	Yoga Lin	4:03
3.	"Ask Why" (我何必)	Janice Yan	4:20
4.	"Lost Heartbeat" (不完美心跳)	Power Station	4:30
5.	"Conquered Love" (愛.接招)	Popu Lady	3:29
6.	"So Close" (幾乎)	Joanne Tseng	4:28
7.	"I Don’t Think I’m in Love with You" (我想我不會愛你)	Hebe Tien	4:41
8.	"Captain S.V" (思凡)	Yoga Lin	3:52
9.	"Leave Me Alone" (寂寞寂寞就好)	Hebe Tien	4:38
10.	"Mystery Guest" (神秘嘉賓)	Yoga Lin	5:30

Songs not featured on the official soundtrack album.

- I Won't Like You (我不會喜歡你) by Chen Bolin

== Broadcast ==
Network(s)/Station(s)	Series premiere	Airing dates	Title
Taiwan	CTV	November 1, 2015 – February 14, 2016 (Every Sunday 22:00-23:30)	必娶女人 (Marry Me, or Not?; lit: )
Taiwan	CTV Bravo	November 1, 2015 – February 14, 2016 (Every Sunday 22:00-23:30)	必娶女人 (Marry Me, or Not?; lit: )
Taiwan	ETTV	November 7, 2015 – February 20, 2016 (Every Saturday 10:00-11:30)	必娶女人 (Marry Me, or Not?; lit: )
Taiwan	EBC東森綜合	November 7, 2015 – February 20, 2016 (Every Saturday 22:00-23:30)	必娶女人 (Marry Me, or Not?; lit: )
Taiwan	CHT MOD	November 21, 2015 – March 5, 2016 (Every Saturday 19:00-20:30 From December 26, it will be changed to 20:30-21:55)	必娶女人 (Marry Me, or Not?; lit: )
Taiwan	Golden Group	December 6, 2015 – March 20, 2016 (Every Sunday 20:30-22:00)	必娶女人 (Marry Me, or Not?; lit: )
Japan	C-POP TV	December 12, 2015 (Every Saturday 13:00-14:00)	Marry Me, or Not? (Marry Me, or Not?; lit: )
United States	超視六十二點六台	December 25, 2015 (Every Monday to Friday 20:00-21:30)	Marry Me, or Not? (Marry Me, or Not?; lit: )
Malaysia	Astro Shuang Xing	February 17, 2016 – March 22, 2016 (Every Monday to Friday 16:00-17:00)	必娶女人 (Marry Me, or Not?; lit: )
Hong Kong	ViuTV	July 7, 2016 – August 20, 2016 (Every Thursday to Friday 20:30-22:00, Saturday, August 20 20:30-22:00)	必娶女人 (Marry Me, or Not?; lit: )
Malaysia	Astro Xi Yue HD	January 31, 2019 – 2019 (Every Thursday to Friday 18:00-20:00)	必娶女人 (Marry Me, or Not?; lit: )
Thailand	Webside:MONOMAX	September 7, 2017 – October 1, 2017 (Every 22:00-23:00)	สงครามหัวใจของยัยเจ้าเล่ห์ (Marry Me, or Not?; lit: )
Thailand	Channel 9 MCOT HD (30)	November 2, 2020 - December 30, 2020 (Every Monday, Tuesday and Wednesday from 23.05 - 00.00) (Wednesday December 9; No Broadcasting) (Monday December 21; No Broadcasting)	แต่งงานไหม หากใจตรงกัน (Marry Me, or Not?; lit: )

== Episode ratings ==
Competing dramas on rival channels airing at the same time slot were:

- FTV - Aquarius, Capricorn, Tân Nương Giá Đáo
- TTV - Bromance

Air Date	Episode	Average Ratings	Rank
Nov 1, 2015	1	1.18	2
Nov 8, 2015	2	1.50	2
Nov 15, 2015	3	1.59	2
Nov 22, 2015	4	1.62	2
Nov 29, 2015	5	1.45	2
Dec 6, 2015	6	1.48	2
Dec 13, 2015	7	1.66	2
Dec 20, 2015	8	1.68	2
Dec 27, 2015	9	1.63	2
Jan 3, 2016	10	1.46	2
Jan 10, 2016	11	1.36	3
Jan 17, 2016	12	1.77	2
Jan 24, 2016	13	1.70	2
Jan 31, 2016	14	1.57	2
February 7, 2016: No episode was aired due to CTV airing of Chinese New Year Special Program
Feb 14, 2016	15	1.95	2
Average ratings		1.57	--

== Awards and nominations ==
Year	Ceremony	Category	Nominee	Result
2016	51st Golden Bell Awards	Best Television Series	Marry Me, or Not?	Nominated
2016	51st Golden Bell Awards	Best Leading Actor in a Television Series	Roy Chiu	Nominated
2016	51st Golden Bell Awards	Best Leading Actress in a Television Series	Ko Chia-yen	Won
2016	51st Golden Bell Awards	Best Supporting Actress in a Television Series	Joanne Tseng	Nominated
2016	51st Golden Bell Awards	Best Directing for a Television Series	Yu Zhong Zhong	Nominated
2016	51st Golden Bell Awards	Best Writing for a Television Series	Jian Qi Feng, Lin Xin Hui	Nominated
