= Hunter with a Scalpel =

Upcoming South Korean television series

- Promotional poster
- Hangul: 메스를 든 사냥꾼
- RR: Meseureul deun sanyangkkun
- MR: Mesŭrŭl tŭn sanyangkkun
- Genre: Crime; Psychological thriller
- Written by: Jo Han-young; Park Hyun-shin; Hong Yeon-yi; Jin Se-hyuk
- Directed by: Lee Jung-hoon
- Starring: Park Ju-hyun; Park Yong-woo; Kang Hoon
- Country of origin: South Korea
- Original language: Korean
- No. of episodes: 16

Production
- Running time: 30 minutes
- Production companies: Soul Creative; STUDIO X+U

Original release
- Network: U+ Mobile TV
- Release: June 16 – July 10, 2025

Hunter with a Scalpel (Korean: 메스를 든 사냥꾼) is a 2025 South Korean crime psychological thriller television series starring Park Ju-hyun, Park Yong-woo, and Kang Hoon. It aired on U+TV and U+ Mobile TV from June 16, to July 10, 2025. with four episodes released weekly from Monday to Thursday. It is also available for streaming on Disney+.

== Synopsis ==
Hunter with a Scalpel depicts the process in which a prominent female forensic pathologist with antisocial personality disorder is confronted by the shadow of her father, whom she killed, and how her honor and life are threatened.

== Cast and characters ==
=== Main ===
- Park Ju-hyun as Seo Se-hyun
- Park Yong-woo as Yoon Jo-gyun
- Kang Hoon as Jung Jung-hyun

=== Supporting ===
==== Police ====
- Kim Min-sang as Choi Jung-soo
- Ryu Seung-soo as Jeon Chang-jin
- Choi Kwang-je as Jang Hyuk-jeon
- Bin Chan-wook as Park Sook-woo
- Kang Sang-jin as Kim Jin-rea

== Production ==
=== Development ===
Hunter with a Scalpel is a crime psychological thriller series planned by STUDIO X+U, produced by Soul Creative and STUDIO X+U, directed by Lee Jung-hoon, and co-written by Jo Han-young, Park Hyun-shin, Hong Yeon-yi, and Jin Se-hyuk. The series consists of 16 episodes.

On December 18, 2024, LG Uplus content studio STUDIO X+U reportedly confirmed the production.

=== Casting ===
On August 21, 2023, Npio Entertainment stated that they have received an offer for Kang Hoon, and is reviewing it.

On September 2, 2024, Park Ju-hyun is reported to appear. Meanwhile, Kang had confirmed his appearance. On December 18, Park, Park Yong-woo, and Kang had officially confirmed their appearances.
