= Nowhere Man (Taiwanese TV series) =

2019 Taiwanese television miniseries

- Promotional poster

Chinese name
- Traditional Chinese: 罪夢者
- Simplified Chinese: 罪梦者
- Literal meaning: The One with Crime and Dreams
Transcriptions
Standard Mandarin
- Hanyu Pinyin: Zuìmèng Zhě
Yue: Cantonese
- Jyutping: Zeoi6 Mung6 Ze2
Southern Min
- Hokkien POJ: Chōe-bāng-chiá
- Genre: Crime; Drama; Thriller
- Created by: Francis Smith; Zoanne Tan
- Written by: Chen Yin-jung
- Story by: Francis Smith; Zoanne Tan; Chen Yu-li; Kuo Po-shen; Jie Zhan
- Directed by: Chen Yin-jung
- Starring: Joseph Chang; Alyssa Chia; Mavis Fan; Wang Po-chieh; Jeremiah Zhang; Zhou Ming-fu; Greg Hsu; Kuo Tzu-chien; Lu Yi-lung
- Composers: Dino Acconci; Hsu Chia-wei; Triodust
- Country of origin: Taiwan
- Original language: Mandarin
- No. of seasons: 1
- No. of episodes: 8

Production
- Executive producers: Francis Smith; Zoanne Tan
- Cinematography: Patrick Chou
- Editor: Chen Yin-jung
- Running time: 33–67 minutes
- Production company: IFA Media

Original release
- Network: Netflix
- Release: October 31, 2019

Nowhere Man is a 2019 Taiwanese television miniseries written, directed, and edited by Chen Yin-jung. It stars Joseph Chang, Alyssa Chia, Mavis Fan, Wang Po-chieh, Jeremiah Zhang, Zhou Ming-fu, Greg Hsu, Kuo Tzu-chien, and Lu Yi-lung. The miniseries follows a death row inmate who must break out of prison to save his kidnapped son and protect his family.

The first Mandarin-language Netflix original series, Nowhere Man premiered in eight parts on October 31, 2019. It received eight Golden Bell Award nominations, including Best Miniseries, and won four.

== Synopsis ==
A strange encounter that causes a man awaiting execution to experience alternate timelines. That leads to his escape from prison to protect his family.

== Cast ==
=== Main ===
- Joseph Chang as Ding Chang-quan
- Alyssa Chia as Jiang Jing-fang
- Mavis Fan as Bai Lan
- Wang Po-chieh as Xiao Sha
- Jeremiah Zhang as Cui Cheng-gui
- Zhou Ming-fu as Cui Wan-fu
- Greg Hsu as Lin Ji-zi / Du Zi-qiang
- Kuo Tzu-chien as Yang Wan-li
- Lu Yi-lung as Xia Shi-ying

=== Recurring ===
- Tou Chung-hua as Wan You-qing
- Benjamin Lee as Wang Qing-nian
- L. C. Sun as Qui Yi-yang
- Shen Hai-yung as Ding Wan-rong / Xia Ding-xiang
- Pan Yi-chun as Zhang Lian-sheng
- Tu Chun-chi as Lin Guan-zhong
- Peng Cian-you as Lin Ben-chuan
- Lucas Hsieh as Jiang Tian-you
- Coco Ho as Wang Xiao-qiu
- Jay Kao as Zhou Xu-liang

=== English cast ===
- Kaiji Tang as Chang Quan
- Vivian Lu as Jing Fang
- Gwendoline Yeo as Bai Lan
- Alan Lee as Xiao Sha
- Greg Chun as Gui
- Khoi Dao as Fu Xing
- Aleks Le as Lin Ji Zi
- Kirk Thornton as Wan Li
- John DeMita as Tang Three Hundred

== Episodes ==
=== Season 1 (2019) ===
No.	Title	Original release date
1	"Chapter 1: The Killing"	October 31, 2019
2	"Chapter 2: The Child"	October 31, 2019
3	"Chapter 3: Ten Years"	October 31, 2019
4	"Chapter 4: Old Friends"	October 31, 2019
5	"Chapter 5: Short-Lived"	October 31, 2019
6	"Chapter 6: Recollection"	October 31, 2019
7	"Chapter 7: OGAWA"	October 31, 2019
8	"Chapter 8: Sleepwalking"	October 31, 2019

== Awards and nominations ==
Year	Award	Category	Recipient(s)	Result
2020	55th Golden Bell Awards	Best Miniseries	Nowhere Man	Nominated
2020	55th Golden Bell Awards	Best Actor in a Miniseries or Television Film	Joseph Chang	Nominated
2020	55th Golden Bell Awards	Best Supporting Actor in a Miniseries or Television Film	Wang Po-chieh	Nominated
2020	55th Golden Bell Awards	Best Supporting Actress in a Miniseries or Television Film	Mavis Fan	Nominated
2020	55th Golden Bell Awards	Best Cinematography	Chou Yi-hsien; Yang Fong-ming; Sun Chi-ming	Won
2020	55th Golden Bell Awards	Best Sound	R.T. Kao; Kenny Cheng; Hsu Chia-wei; Triodust; Tang Shiang-chu	Won
2020	55th Golden Bell Awards	Best Lighting	Hsieh Sung-ming	Won
2020	55th Golden Bell Awards	Best Art and Design	Liang Shuo-lin; Zoey Shih	Won
