= Patrick Shih =

Taiwanese actor & model (born 1996)

- 施柏宇
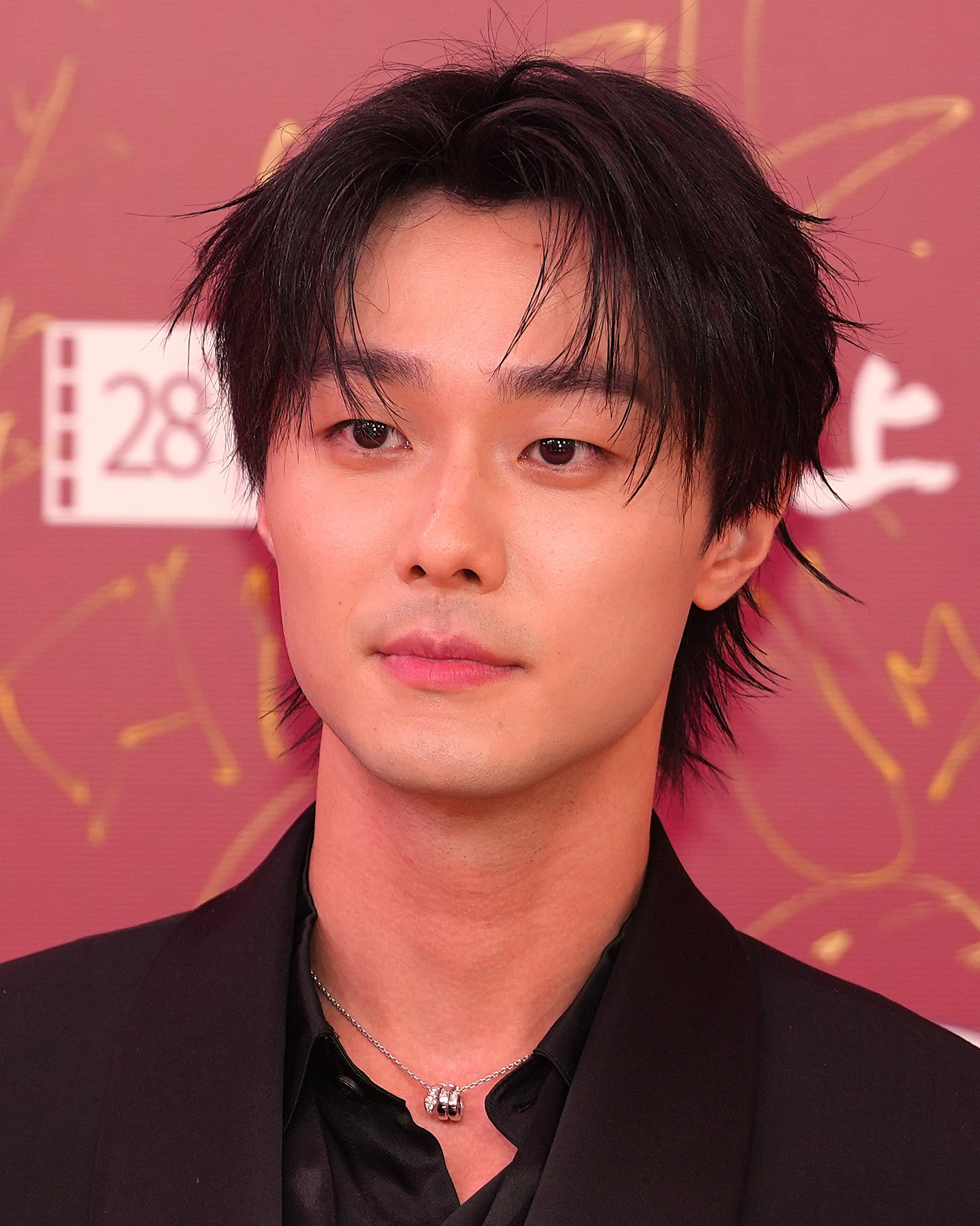
- Shih at 2026 Shanghai International Film Festival
- Born: Shih Po-yu; 9 August 1996 (age 30); Taiwan
- Education: Fu Jen Catholic University (BA)
- Occupations: Actor, model
- Years active: 2016–present

Chinese name
- Traditional Chinese: 施柏宇
- Simplified Chinese: 施柏宇
Transcriptions
Standard Mandarin
- Hanyu Pinyin: Shī Bóyǔ
- Bopomofo: ㄕˉ ㄅㄛˊ ㄩˇ
Southern Min
- Hokkien POJ: Si Pek-ú

Shih Po-yu (Chinese: 施柏宇; Pe̍h-ōe-jī: Si Pek-ú, born 9 August 1996), also known as Patrick Shih, is a Taiwanese actor and model.

He is known for his roles in the drama Someday Or One Day (2019).

== Filmography ==
=== Television series ===
Year	English title	Chinese title	Role	Notes
2016	Gamer's Generation	電競紀元	Nan Ke	
2018	HIStory2: Crossing the Line	HIStory2: 越界	Wang Chen-Wu	
2019–2020	Someday Or One Day	想見你	Mo Jun-Jie	
2023	Taiwan Crime Stories	台灣犯罪故事	Lin Xue-wen	
