= Kang Hoon =

South Korean actor (born 1991)

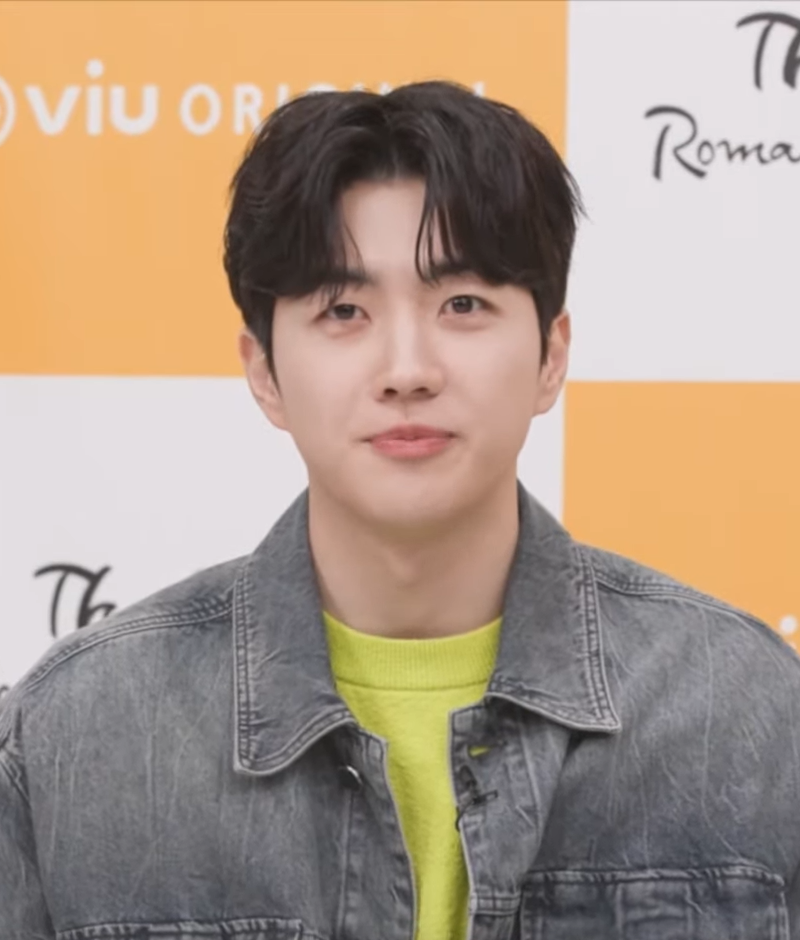
- Kang in 2023
- Born: May 23, 1991 (age 35); Gunsan, South Korea
- Education: University of Suwon – Theatre & Film
- Occupation: Actor
- Years active: 2009–present
- Agent: Npio

Korean name
- Hangul: 강훈
- RR: Gang Hun
- MR: Kang Hun

Kang Hoon (Korean: 강훈, born May 23, 1991) is a South Korean actor. He is best known for his role in the historical dramas The Red Sleeve (2021), A Time Called You (2023), and The Secret Romantic Guesthouse (2023).

== Filmography ==
=== Film ===
Key
†	Denotes films that have not yet been released

Year	Title	Role	Notes	Ref.
2009	Gori		Short Film	
2014	Picnic	Hoon	Short Film	
2014	Forever with Tiffany	Tiffany Blue	Short Film	
2015	Mind Control	Haru's father	Short Film	
2015	Your Meaning		Short Film	
2016	I Don't Even Know You're A Man Now		Short Film	

=== Television series ===
Key
†	Denotes television productions that have not yet been released

Year	Title	Role	Notes	Ref.
2018	Let Me Introduce Her	Ji Soo-han		
2019	Rookie Historian Goo Hae-ryung	Hyun Kyung-mook		
2019	At Eighteen	Ma Hwi-young's older brother	Cameo (Episode 16)	
2019	When the Devil Calls Your Name	Assailant	Cameo	
2020	Meow, the Secret Boy	Go Doo-shik		
2021	You Are My Spring	Kang Tae-jeong		
2021	The Red Sleeve	Hong Deok-ro		
2022	Twenty-Five Twenty-One	adult Baek Yi-hyun	Cameo (Episode 16)	
2022	Little Women	Ha Jong-ho		
2023	The Secret Romantic Guesthouse	Kim Si-yeol		
2023	A Time Called You	Jung In-kyu		
2024	Dear Hyeri	Kang Joo-yeon		
2025	Hunter with a Scalpel	Jung Jung-hyun		
2025	Our Movie	Actor	Cameo (Episode 12)	
2026	My Bias, My Boss	Kang Ha-gi		
2026	Happy Anding	Kang Tae-gu		

=== Web series ===
Year	Title	Role	Notes	Ref.
2017	Office Watch	Kim Kyung-joon		
2018	Flower Ever After	Yoo Hyun-soo		
2018	Not Alright, But It's Alright	HR person	Cameo (Episode 7)	

=== Television shows ===
Year	Title	Role	Ref.
2023	Express Delivery Mongolia Edition	Cast Member	
2024	Running Man	Cast Member	

=== Web shows ===
Year	Title	Role	Notes	Ref.
2018	I Oppa Don't Know	Cast Member	Studio Lulu Lala	

== Ambassadorship ==
- Public relations ambassador for the National Museum of Korea (2023)

== Awards and nominations ==
Name of the award ceremony, year presented, category, nominee of the award, and the result of the nomination
Award ceremony	Year	Category	Nominee / Work	Result	Ref.
MBC Drama Awards	2021	Best New Actor	The Red Sleeve	Won	
MBC Drama Awards	2021	Excellence Award, Actor in a Miniseries	The Red Sleeve	Nominated	
Brand Customer Loyalty Awards	2022	Rising Star Actor	The Red Sleeve	Won	
Asia Model Awards	2022	Rookie Award, Actor	Kang Hoon	Won	
SBS Drama Awards	2023	Excellence Award, Actor in a Miniseries Romance/Comedy Drama	The Secret Romantic Guesthouse	Nominated	
SBS Entertainment Awards	2024	Rising Star Award	Kang Hoon	Won	
Korea First Brand Awards	2025	Actor (Hot Trend)	Kang Hoon	Won	
