= Ko Chia-yen =

Taiwanese actress

- 柯佳嬿
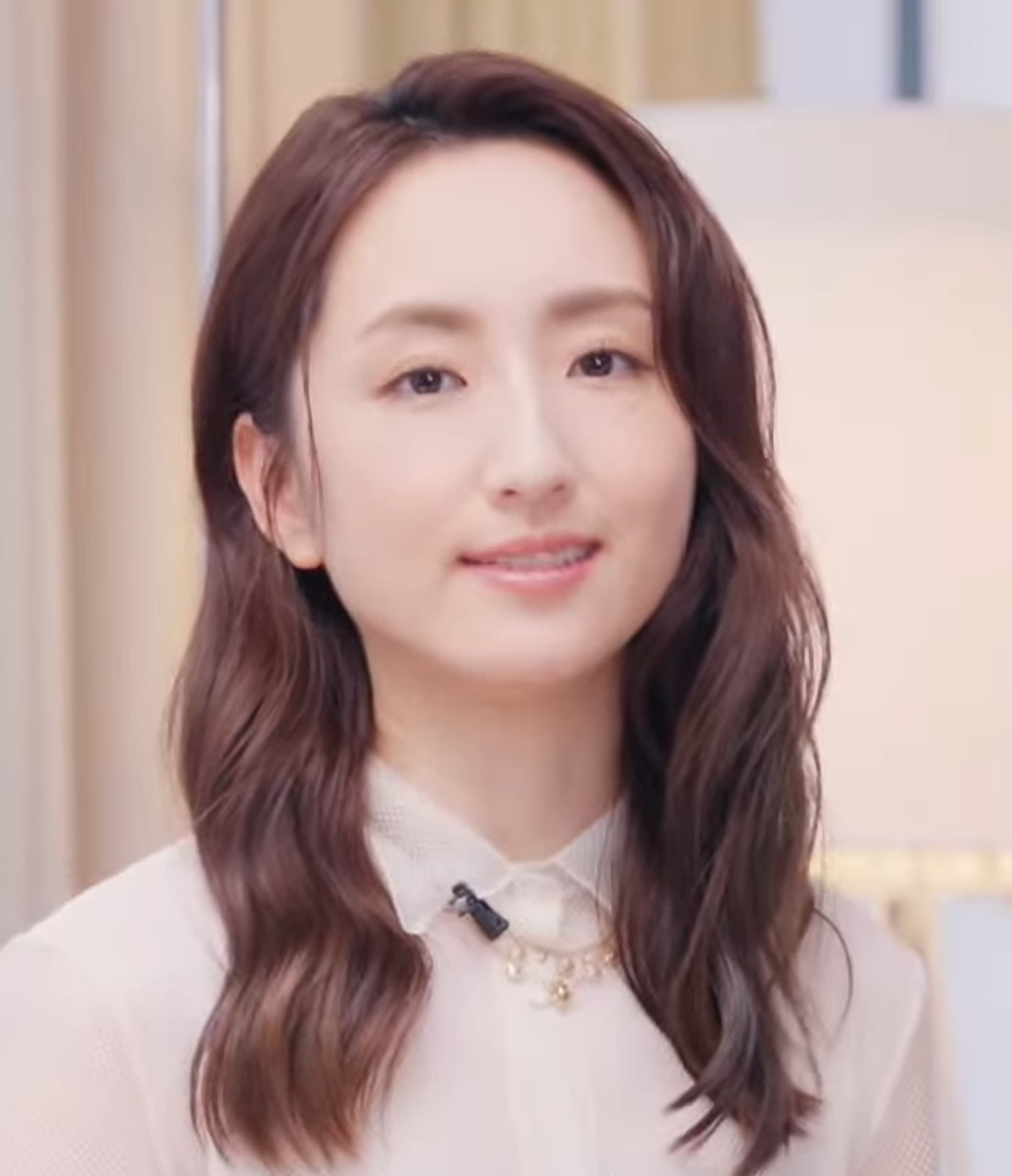
- Ko in 2021
- Born: 10 January 1985 (age 41); Shilin, Taipei, Taiwan
- Other names: Alice Ko; Alice Ke; Ke Jia-yan
- Education: Shih Chien University
- Occupation: Actress
- Years active: 2006–present
- Spouse: Hsieh Kun-da (m. 2017)

Chinese name
- Traditional Chinese: 柯佳嬿
- Simplified Chinese: 柯佳嬿
Transcriptions
Standard Mandarin
- Hanyu Pinyin: Kē Jiāyàn
Southern Min
- Hokkien POJ: Koa Ka-iàn

Ko Chia-yen (Chinese: 柯佳嬿; Pe̍h-ōe-jī: Koa Ka-iàn; born 10 January 1985), also known as Alice Ko, is a Taiwanese actress.

== Career ==
Ko's debut acting role was in the 2006 film Do Over, by award-winning director Cheng Yu-chieh. Subsequently, she had starring roles in the films Miao Miao (2008), Monga (2010) and Night Market Hero (2011). She first came to prominence for her role in the domestic hit series Office Girls (2011), in which she played a marketing specialist. She is also known for her roles in the drama series Marry Me, or Not? and Someday Or One Day, for which she won the Golden Bell Award for Best Actress in 2016 and 2020 respectively.

== Personal life ==
Beginning 2012, Ko has been in a relationship with actor-singer Hsieh Kun-da, a former member of boy band Energy, whom she had met on the set of the television series Gung Hay Fat Choy. After five years of dating, Ko and Hsieh married on December 3, 2017. They held their wedding ceremony at Marriot Hotel Taipei the following year on September 15.

== Filmography ==
=== Television series ===
Year	English title	Original title	Role	Network	Notes
2008	Police et vous	波麗士大人	Pan Mei-ho	TTV Main Channel	Cameo
2009	My Queen	敗犬女王	Han Hsiang-yun	TTV Main Channel	Cameo
2009	Game Winning Hit	比賽開始	Lin Ming Yu	TTV Main Channel	alternative title: Play Ball
2011	Office Girls	小資女孩向前衝	Shen Hsin Ren	TTV Main Channel	
2012	Gung Hay Fat Choy	我們發財了	Jiang Yu Jen	SET Metro / Eastern Television	
2013	Dragon Gate	飛越龍門客棧	Chiu Mo Yu	CTV	
2014	Say I Love You	勇敢說出我愛你	Chen Yi Jun	CTV	
2015	The End of Love	愛情的盡頭	Orange	PTS	
2015	Constellation Women Series: Leo Woman	星座愛情獅子女	Liu Li Ren	Formosa Television	
2015	Ghost Stories 4	聊齋新編-陸判	Chu Chi Ting	Zhejiang Television	
2015	Marry Me, or Not?	必娶女人	Vivienne Tsai/Tsai Huan Jen	EBC /CTV	
2016	La Grande Chaumière Violette	紫色大稻埕	Chuang Ju Yueh	SET Taiwan	
2017	Attention, Love!	稍息立正我愛你	Han Rong	EBC / CTV	Cameo
2019	Déjà Vu	如果愛，重來	He Yong Chi	iQiyi / TTV Main Channel	
2019	Someday Or One Day	想見你	Huang Yu Hsuan / Chen Yun Ru	CTV / Star Chinese Channel	
2022	Rainless Love in a Godless Land	無神之地不下雨	Toem	iQiyi	
2022	Mom, Don't Do That!	媽，別鬧了！	Chen Ruo-min	Netflix	
2023	Copycat Killer	模仿犯	Hu Yun Hui	Netflix	
2023	We Go Fast On Trust	極速悖論	Shen Shi	Mango TV	
2025	I Am Married...But!	童話故事下集	I-ling	Netflix	
2025	Had I Not Seen the Sun	如果我不曾見過太陽	Hsia Ching Tien	Netflix	
2026	Kidnap Game	—N/a	Christina Lin	Fuji Television, Viu, Channel A	

=== Film ===
Year	English title	Original title	Role	Notes
2006	Do Over	一年之初	Butterfly	
2007	God Man Dog	流浪神狗人	Advertisement star	
2008	Miao Miao	渺渺	Miao Miao	
2008	The Eighteenth Birthday Party	愛瑪的晚宴		Short film
2010	Monga	艋舺	Ning	
2011	Night Market Hero	雞排英雄	Lin Enan	
2012	Bear It	熊熊愛上你	Selina	
2012	Through The Night	在夜的盡頭	Leigh	Short film
2013	Judgement Day	世界末日	Li Shuzhen	
2013	The Croods	—N/a	Eep	Taiwanese version, voice
2014	Lion Dancing	鐵獅玉玲瓏	Chen Hui-hsin	
2014	Partners in Crime	共犯	School counselor	
2014	Freak Family	超級夥伴	Qiu Benming	Television
2015	Where the Wind Settles	風中家族	Ayu	
2015	Zinnia Flower	百日告別	Wen	
2016	Welcome to the Happy Days	五星級魚干女	Fang-ju	
2016	The Secret Life of Pets	—N/a	Katie	Taiwanese version, voice
2016	See You Tomorrow	擺渡人	Bar patron	Cameo
2017	Who Killed Cock Robin	目擊者	Hsu Ai-ting	
2017	The Bold, the Corrupt, and the Beautiful	血觀音	Tang Chen (adult)	
2018	Let's Cheat Together	市長夫人的秘密	Miu Miu	
2019	Stand By Me	陪你很久很久	Celebrity	
2020	Your Love Song	你的情歌	Yu Jing	
2020	Abyssal	海霧	Xiao Jing	
2020	What Con Lovers Do	愛的詐欺犯	Li Ye-an	Television
2022	Reclaim	一家之主	Luo Jia-ning	Netflix film
2022	Someday or One Day: The Movie	想見你：電影版	Huang Yu-hsuan / Chen Yun-ru	

=== Music video appearances ===
Year	Artist	Song title
2004	Chang Chen-yue	"I Will Miss You"
2005	Jay Chou	"Maple Leaf"
2005	Will Liu	"Rainbow Heaven"
2005	Vivian Hsu	"Smiling Eyes"
2006	JJ Lin	"Cao Cao"
2008	Matilda Tao	"Jealousy"
2009	Khalil Fong	"Nothing's Gonna Change My Love for You"
2010	A-Lin	"Breakup Takes Practice"
2011	Blue J	"You Are My Everyday"
2012	Genie Chuo	"Xiǎng fēi de zì yóu luò tǐ"
2013	O.D	"Good Love"
2015	Joanne Tseng and Real	"Love's Forever"
2015	Yoga Lin	"Detour"
2019	Waa Wei	"Panic Attack"

== Published works ==
- Ko, Chia-yen (2012). Walk into Alice. Taipei: Kate Publishing. ISBN 978-986-6175-37-4.
- Ko, Chia-yen (2021). Hello, Goodbye. Taipei: Readd Publishing. ISBN 9789869879354.

== Discography ==
=== Singles ===
Year	Title	Notes
2021	"Hug" (抱一抱一下)	Featured artist

== Awards and nominations ==
Year	Award	Category	Nominated work	Result
2016	51st Golden Bell Awards	Best Actress	Marry Me, or Not?	Won
2016	21st Asian Television Awards	Best Actress in a Leading Role	La Grande Chaumière Violette	Nominated
2017	22nd Asian Television Awards	Best Actress in a Leading Role	Welcome to Happy Days	Nominated
2020	55th Golden Bell Awards	Best Actress	Someday or One Day	Won
2022	Seoul International Drama Awards	People's Choice – Popular Actress Award	Rainless Love in a Godless Land	Won
