= CHT MOD =

Taiwan-based consumer IPTV service

- Country: Republic of China (Taiwan)
- Availability: IPTV
- Founded: 2004
- Broadcast area: Republic of China (Taiwan)
- Official website: mod.cht.com.tw

CHT MOD (Multimedia On Demand of Chunghwa Telecom, Chinese: 中華電信MOD) is a Taiwan-based consumer IPTV service, operated by Chunghwa Telecom. Up to now, The current number of customers reached 1.48 million.

== History ==
In January 2003, Chunghwa Telecom applied to the Information Office of the Executive Yuan for IPTV business. At the end of November 2003, Chunghwa Telecom approved the launch of IPTV business by the Information Office of the Executive Yuan, named "Chunghwa Telecom MOD".

In February 2004, the Information Bureau of the Executive Yuan was issued to Chunghwa Telecom an IPTV operation license.

On 3 March 2004, Chunghwa Telecom held MOD opening press conference, Chunghwa Telecom Chairman Hochen Tan declared: "MOD users this year, 100,000, three year a million!”.

On 18 August 2005, Chunghwa Telecom MOD renamed to "Chunghwa Telecom Big TV", emphasizing interactive TV and on-demand video function, slogan was "our TV station, rich and exciting". In 2006, Chunghwa Telecom big TV changed its name to "Chunghwa Telecom multimedia content transmission platform", referred to as "Chunghwa Telecom MOD".

== Set-top box model ==
Front	Back	Remote control	Model no.	Description
			MOD205	provides two microphone jacks, a USB socket and a smart card slot.
			MOD304	This is the most common model, without a smart card slot, and no microphone jack.
