= Golden Bell Award for Best Host in a Variety Show =

Television award for Best Host in a Variety Show

- Awarded for: Best Host in a Variety Show
- Location: Taiwan
- Presented by: Bureau of Audiovisual and Music Industry Development
- First award: 1980
- Currently held by: Jacky Wu, Chen Han-dian and Lulu Huang Lu Zi Yin for Hot Door Night (2023)
- Website: gba.tavis.tw

The Golden Bell Award for Best Host in a Variety Show (Chinese: 電視金鐘獎綜藝節目主持人獎) is one of the categories of the competition for the Taiwanese television production, Golden Bell Awards. It has been awarded since 1980.

== Award winners ==
=== 1980s ===
Year	Winner	English title	Original title	Ref
1980; 15th Golden Bell Awards	Chang Hsiao-yen	Variety 100	綜藝一百	
1981; 16th Golden Bell Awards	Lee Chi-chun	Penglai Xiandao	蓬萊仙島	
1982; 17th Golden Bell Awards	Chang Hsiao-yen	Variety 100	綜藝一百	
1983; 18th Golden Bell Awards	Chang Hsiao-yen	Variety 100	綜藝一百	
1984; 19th Golden Bell Awards	Tien Wen-chung and Shen Chun-hua	I Love Hong Niang	我愛紅娘	
1985; 20th Golden Bell Awards	Tien Wen-chung and Shen Chun-hua	I Love Hong Niang	我愛紅娘	
1986; 21st Golden Bell Awards	Chow Mei-yee and Ba Ge	Shuang Xing Bao Xi	雙星報喜	
1987; 22nd Golden Bell Awards	Chow Mei-yee and Ba Ge	Shuang Xing Bao Xi	雙星報喜	
1988; 23rd Golden Bell Awards	Chao Shu-hai	Let's Come Together	大家一起來	
1989; 24th Golden Bell Awards	Fang Fang and Peng Chia-chia	Lian Huan Pao	連環泡	

=== 1990s ===
Year	Winner	English title	Original title	Ref
1990; 25th Golden Bell Awards	Chao Ning and Yvette Tsui	Woman, Woman	女人、女人	
1991; 26th Golden Bell Awards	Ba Ge and Fang Fang-fang	Just Tonight	就在今夜	
1992; 27th Golden Bell Awards	Chao Ning and Yvette Tsui	Woman, Woman	女人、女人	
1993; 28th Golden Bell Awards	Fang Fang-fang and Lee Mao-shan	Nights of the Rose	玫瑰之夜	
1994	No Awards Ceremony			
1995; 30th Golden Bell Awards	Chang Fei and Fei Yu-ching	The Fantastic Brothers	龍兄虎弟	
1996	No Awards Ceremony			
1997; 32nd Golden Bell Awards	Fei Yu-ching and Luo Shih-feng	Golden Voice, Golden Award	金嗓金賞	
1998	No Awards Ceremony			
1999; 34th Golden Bell Awards	Matilda Tao	Leçons d' Amour	戀愛講義	

=== 2000s ===
Year	Winner	English title	Original title	Ref
2000; 35th Golden Bell Awards	Chang Hsiao-yen, Harlem Yu, Mickey Huang and Pu Hsueh-liang	Super Sunday	超級星期天	
2001; 36th Golden Bell Awards (Variety)	Chang Hsiao-yen, Harlem Yu, Mickey Huang and Pu Hsueh-liang	Super Sunday	超級星期天	
2001; 36th Golden Bell Awards (Entertainment & Humor)	Matilda Tao	Entertainment News	娛樂新聞	
2002; 37th Golden Bell Awards (Variety)	Tong Chih-cheng	Different World	世界大不同	
2002; 37th Golden Bell Awards (Musical Variety)	Chris Hung and Liu Fu-chu	Taiwan Red Singers	台灣紅歌星	
2003; 38th Golden Bell Awards (Variety)	Kuo Tzu-chien	2100 Everybody Speaks Nonsenses	2100全民亂講	
2003; 38th Golden Bell Awards (Musical Variety)	Chris Hung and Liu Fu-chu	Taiwan Red Singers	台灣紅歌星	
2004; 39th Golden Bell Awards (Variety)	Chang Fei and Huang Pin-yuan	Variety Big Brother	綜藝大哥大	
2004; 39th Golden Bell Awards (Musical Variety)	Peng Chia-chia and Chiang Shu-na	Golden Night Club	黃金夜總會	
2005; 40th Golden Bell Awards (Variety)	Kevin Tsai and Dee Hsu	Kangsi Coming	康熙來了	
2005; 40th Golden Bell Awards (Musical Variety)	Fei Yu-ching	Fei Yu-ching's Music	費玉清的清音樂	
2006; 41st Golden Bell Awards (Variety)	Hsu Nai-lin and Sam Tseng	Big Rich	小氣大財神	
2006; 41st Golden Bell Awards (Musical Variety)	Peng Chia-chia and He Yi-hang	Golden Night Club	黃金夜總會	
2006; 41st Golden Bell Awards (Community Variety)	Huang Hsi-tien	Grassland Champion	草地狀元	
2006; 41st Golden Bell Awards (Info Variety)	Wu Nien-jen	These People, Those People	這些人 那些人	
2007; 42nd Golden Bell Awards (Variety)	Matilda Tao	One Million Star	超級星光大道	
2007; 42nd Golden Bell Awards (Musical Variety)	Chiang Shu-na	Yue Lai Yue Dong Ting	樂來樂動聽	
2007; 42nd Golden Bell Awards (Community Variety)	Hou Chang-ming	Closeup	大特寫	
2008; 43rd Golden Bell Awards (Variety)	Jacky Wu and Aya Liu	Guess	我猜我猜我猜猜猜	
2008; 43rd Golden Bell Awards (Musical Variety)	Li Jing	Super Idol	超級偶像	
2009; 44th Golden Bell Awards	Hu Gua	Go To Top 101	挑戰101	

=== 2010s ===
Year	Winner	English title	Original title	Ref
2010; 45th Golden Bell Awards	Chu Ke-liang and Rene Hou	Zhu Ge Club	豬哥會社	
2011; 46th Golden Bell Awards	Hsieh Hsin-hao and Aaron Chan	Super Taste	食尚玩家	
2012; 47th Golden Bell Awards	Peng Chia-chia and Hsu Hsiao-shun	Super Night Club	超級夜總會	
2013; 48th Golden Bell Awards	Chang Hsiao-yen and Mickey Huang	Red White Red White Victory	紅白紅白我勝利	
2014; 49th Golden Bell Awards	Hsu Nai-lin and Sam Tseng	Genius Go Go Go	天才衝衝衝	
2015; 50th Golden Bell Awards	Mickey Huang	Global Chinese Music	全球中文音樂榜上榜	
2016; 51st Golden Bell Awards	Jacky Wu and Sandy Wu	Super Entourage	小明星大跟班	
2017; 52nd Golden Bell Awards	Show Lo and Linda Chien	100% Entertainment	娛樂百分百	
2018; 53rd Golden Bell Awards	Hu Gua, Aaron Chan and Cheryl Hsieh	Variety Get Together	綜藝大集合	
2019; 54th Golden Bell Awards	Mickey Huang and Pu Hsueh-liang	Super Reunion	超級同學會	

=== 2020s ===
Year	Winner	English title	Original title	Ref
2020; 55th Golden Bell Awards	Hsieh Hsin-hao and Chen Tai-hsiang	Taiwan Jin Song	台灣金頌	
2021; 56th Golden Bell Awards	Jesse Tang, Aaron Yan and Sandy Wu	36 Questions	36題愛上你	
2022; 57th Golden Bell Awards	Mickey Huang and Lulu Huang Lu Zi Yin	Wedding Singer	婚禮歌手	
2023; 58th Golden Bell Awards	Jacky Wu, Chen Han-dian and Lulu Huang Lu Zi Yin	Hot Door Night	綜藝大熱門	
