= Dee Hsu =

Taiwanese actress and singer (born 1978)

Dee Hsu 徐熙娣
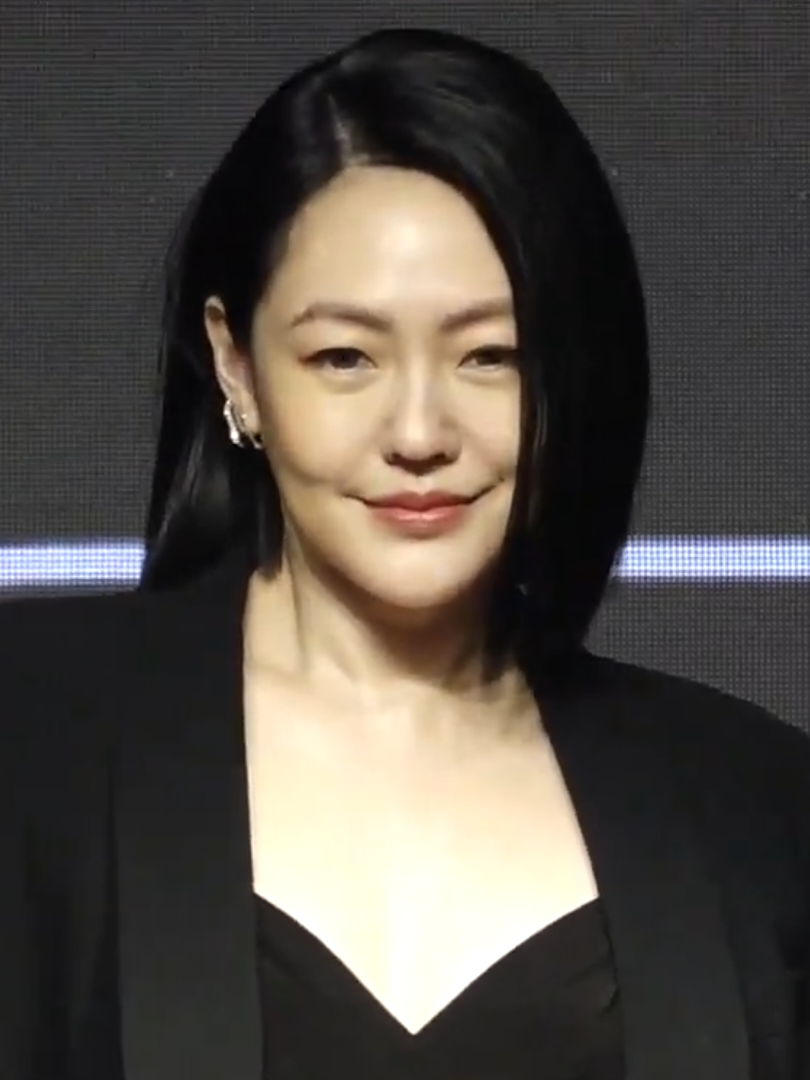
- Hsu in 2023
- Born: 14 June 1978 (age 48); Taipei, Taiwan
- Other names: Hsu Hsi-ti 小S (pinyin: xiǎo S) elephant Dee
- Occupations: Actress; singer; television host
- Years active: 1994–present
- Spouse: Mike Xu (m. 2005)
- Children: 3
- Relatives: Barbie Hsu (sister); Koo Jun-yup (brother-in-law)
- Musical career
- Genre: Mandopop
- Formerly of: A.S.O.S.

Chinese name
- Chinese: 徐熙娣
- Hanyu Pinyin: Xú Xīdì
- Wade–Giles: Hsü Hsi-ti

Dee Hsu (Chinese: 徐熙娣; pinyin: Xú Xīdì; born 14 June 1978), stage name Little S (小S; Xiǎo S), also credited as elephant DEE for her EP of the same name (2014), is a Taiwanese television host, actress, and singer. She debuted alongside her older sister Barbie Hsu (Big S) in 1994 as part of the musical duo S.O.S (later A.S.O.S), which shifted its focus to television hosting beginning in 1996. The sisters co-hosted variety shows such as Guess (1996–2000) and 100% Entertainment (1998–2005). Hsu gained wide popularity for co-hosting Kangsi Coming (2004–2016) with Kevin Tsai, for which the duo won Best Host in a Variety Show at the 40th Golden Bell Awards in 2005. She won the award again for Dee Girl's Talk at the 60th Golden Bell Awards in 2025.

Hsu ranked 27th on the Forbes China Celebrity 100 in 2010, 46th in 2011, 31st in 2012, 27th in 2013, 54th in 2014, and 75th in 2015.

== Career ==
Hsu was born in Taipei, Taiwan, as the youngest of three sisters. Her eldest sister is Hsu Shi-hsien, followed by Barbie Hsu, with whom Dee debuted as a musical duo in 1994 initially known as S.O.S. (Sisters of Shiu). Their cousin, Chelsey Chang Chia-ru, is a news anchor and journalist.

In 1996, amid a declining music career and contractual disputes with their label, which banned them from releasing albums under the group name, they rebranded as A.S.O.S. (Adult Sisters of Shiu). At the invitation of TV producer Wang Wei-Zhong, who later became their manager, the sisters shifted their career focus from singing to hosting. They co-hosted variety show Guess (1996–2000) with Lung Shao-hua and then Jacky Wu, respectively; entertainment news program 100% Entertainment (1998–2005); variety show Weekend Three Precious Fun (週末三寶Fun) (2001) with Harlem Yu; and cooking show Gourmet Secrets of the Stars (2007–2008). They ended their management partnership with Wang Wei-Zhong and established their own studios in 2010.

From 2004 to 2016, Hsu co-hosted the talk show Kangsi Coming with Kevin Tsai, gaining wide popularity across the Chinese world for her wacky, sassy, and often caustic wit. After Kangsi wrapped, Hsu hosted two seasons of iQiyi's S-Style Show (2016–2017), her first time hosting a show in mainland China. The program was briefly taken down by the Chinese censors in 2017 due to its alleged explicitness. Hsu and Tsai reunited for the Youku variety show Zhenxiang ba! Huahua Wanwu for three seasons from 2018 to 2020 until the COVID-19 pandemic, but they failed to replicate the popularity of Kangsi Coming.

In 2018, Hsu participated in the Chinese reality show Her Flower Store. In 2019, she participated in the Chinese travelogue series We Are Real Friends with Barbie, Mavis Fan and Aya Liu. She hosted Dee's Talk (2021–2022), co-produced by Barbie. Hsu had been hosting the web show Dee Girls Talk (2022–) until the death of Barbie in February 2025, after which she took a leave, with Sandy Wu and Chia Ling Lin serving as the stand-in hosts. Hsu and her Dee's Girl Talk co-host Patrick Liu won the 60th Golden Bell Award for Best Host in a Variety Show in 2025. She returned to hosting in March 2026.

As a solo singer after Pervert Girls (2001), the last album of A.S.O.S., Hsu released her EP in 2014 under the stage name elephant DEE. The EP features five songs composed by her; four include lyrics written by her, while one has lyrics by Barbie. She held her first solo concert at the live house Legacy Taipei the next year. In 2019, she released a promotional duet, "I Am Not Madame Bovary," with Da Peng for the film of the same name. In addition, Hsu wrote lyrics for singers such as Tanya Chua, Mavis Fan and Eric Chou.

As an actor, Hsu starred in Taiwanese sitcom Six Friends (2002) and TV drama Say Yes Enterprise (2004). After Kangsi wrapped in 2016, Hsu starred in the film Didi's Dream (2017), directed by Tsai. The film received mixed reviews and performed poorly at the box office. She had a cameo in the Chinese version of Meteor Garden (2018), a remake of Barbie's breakout show in 2001. She acted opposite Wu Kang-ren in the Netflix show At the Moment (2023).

== Personal life ==
Hsu dated Micky Huang for four years until their high-profile breakup in 2000 at the height of Huang's popularity, which derailed Huang's career due to his alleged cheating with Bowie Tsang. The former couple reconciled on Kangsi Coming in 2015.

Hsu married Taiwanese businessman Mike Xu (许雅钧) in 2005. They have three daughters, Elly (許曦文), Lily (許韶恩) and Alice (許曦恩).

== Controversy ==
=== Top Pot Bakery ===
In 2013, Hsu was embroiled in a scandal involving Top Pot Bakery, a brand she endorsed and in which her family held shares. The bakery was exposed for using artificial flavoring in products advertised as "all-natural." Additionally, Hsu, her husband, and her father-in-law, Xu Ching-hsiang (許慶祥), were charged by prosecutors with insider trading between June and August 2013, when they had become aware of the bakery's unpublished financial losses and the planned change of chairman at its parent company, Genome International. In 2014, prosecutors dropped charges against Hsu. In 2015, Hsu's husband was found not guilty, while her father-in-law was sentenced to two years in prison. In 2016, her husband's acquittal was reaffirmed in the second-instance ruling, while her father-in-law's sentence was reduced to 1 year and 10 months, with a 4-year probation and 20 hours of mandatory legal education. In 2018, the Taiwan High Court upheld the second-instance sentence for her father-in-law.

=== Chinese nationalist trolling controversy ===
In 2021, Hsu referred to Taiwanese Olympians as "national players" on social media. Despite her background in a deep-blue family and being a high-profile Kuomintang supporter, the term was criticized by Chinese nationalist internet users, and Hsu was accused of signaling support for Taiwanese independence, resulting in the loss of her endorsements in mainland China. The Taiwan Affairs Office of the State Council of China called the incident a "deliberate act" by those with "political manipulation" in mind, targeting Taiwanese celebrities working in mainland China and "sabotaging cultural interactions." The Office also called for netizens to "sharpen their instincts and not allow secessionists to cause problems with their bad behaviour." Hsu thanked the Office for clarifying on Weibo.

== Filmography ==
=== Variety show ===
Year	Title	Role	Ref.
1998–2006	Guess Guess Guess 你猜你猜你猜猜猜	Host	
1998–2006	100% Entertainment 娛樂百分百	Host	
2004–2016	Kangsi Coming 康熙來了	Host	
2007–2008	Gourmet Secrets of the Stars	Host	
2016–2017	S-style Show 姐姐好餓	Host	
2018–2020	真相吧！花花万物	Host	
2018–2019	Sister's Flower Shop 小姐姐的花店	Host	
2019	我們是真正的朋友	Host	
2021	Hsu's Talk 熙娣想聊	Host	
2022–	Dee Girl's Talk 小姐不熙娣	Host	

=== Television series ===
Year	Title	Role	Notes
2002	Six Friends	Hua Tzu	
2004	Say Yes Enterprise	Hsu Hsiao-hung	
2013	PMAM	Hsiao S	Cameo
2018	Meteor Garden	Dao Ming Zhuang	Sister of Dao Ming Si
2023	At the Moment	Chang Wei-hsi	Co-starring Wu Kang-ren

=== Film ===
Year	Title	Role	Notes
2008	What on Earth Have I Done Wrong?!		Cameo
2017	Didi's Dream	Shangguan Didi / Xu Chunmei	

=== Voice dub ===
Year	Title	Role
2004	The Incredibles	Mirage
2016	Finding Dory	Dory

=== Awards ceremony host ===
Year	Event	Notes
2004	39th Golden Bell Awards	
2006	17th Golden Melody Awards	Co-host (with Matilda Tao)
2008	19th Golden Melody Awards	Co-host (with Matilda Tao, Patty Hou and Barbie Hsu)
2010	21st Golden Melody Awards	Co-host (with Harlem Yu)
2010	47th Golden Horse Awards	Co-host (with Kevin Tsai)

== Awards and nominations ==
Golden Bell Awards
Year	Work	Category	Result	Ref.
2004	Say Yes Enterprise	Best Supporting Actress	Nominated	
2005	Kangsi Coming	Best Host in a Variety Show	Won	
2006	Kangsi Coming	Best Host in a Variety Show	Nominated	
2007	Kangsi Coming	Best Host in a Variety Show	Nominated	
2008	Kangsi Coming	Best Host in a Variety Show	Nominated	
2022	Dee's Talk	Best Host in a Variety Show	Nominated	
2024	Dee Girl's Talk	Best Host in a Variety Show	Nominated	
2025	Dee Girl's Talk	Best Host in a Variety Show	Won	
