= Lulu Huang Lu Zi Yin =

Taiwanese television host, singer and actress

- 黃路梓茵
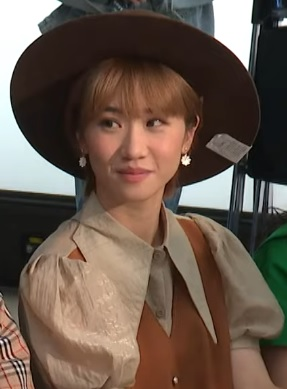
- Lulu in October 2022
- Born: Ciwas Huang Lu Tz-yin; 24 April 1991 (age 35); Daya District, Taichung County, Taiwan
- Other names: Huang Lu Tzu Yin ルーズーイン
- Education: National Taiwan University of Arts
- Occupations: Television host, singer, actress
- Years active: 2008—present
- Spouse: Chen Han-dian (m. 2025)

Chinese name
- Chinese: 黃路梓茵
- Hanyu Pinyin: Huáng Lù Zǐ Yīn
- Musical career
- Genres: Mandopop
- Instrument: Vocals
- Label: Universal Music Taiwan (2016–present)

Lulu Huang Lu Zi Yin (Chinese: 黃路梓茵; born 24 April 1991) is a Taiwanese television host, singer and actress. She is of Atayal descent, Lu being her original surname and Huang Lu as her official aboriginal family name. She gained attention for her impressions of host Matilda Tao on variety show University, later establishing herself primarily as a television host.

== Personal life ==
She was in a relationship with her iWalker co-host A Da from 2013 to 2019. On 20 October 2025, she married comedian Chen Han-dian.

== Selected filmography ==
=== Variety show ===
Network	English title	Original title	Notes
CTi	University	大學生了沒	With Na Dow and Ken Lin
Sanlih E-Television	Hot Door Night	綜藝大熱門	With Jacky Wu and Chen Han-dian
Sanlih E-Television	iWalker	愛玩客	With A Da
Sanlih E-Television	Showbiz	完全娛樂	With Na Dow, Hsueh Shih-ling and Harry Chang
CTV, CTi	Hope Star	希望之星	With Mickey Huang
ETtoday, TTV	Jungle Voice	聲林之王	
ETtoday, JET TV	CooKing	料理之王	
EBC Variety	Wedding Singer	婚禮歌手	With Mickey Huang
PTS	Music Viva Viva	姐妹們的音樂萬萬歲	With Bowie Tsang

==== Event ====
Year	English title	Original title	Notes
2016	51st Golden Bell Awards pre-show	第51屆金鐘獎星光大道	With Na Dow
2016	27th Golden Melody Awards pre-show	第27屆金曲獎星光大道	With Dennis Au
2017	52nd Golden Bell Awards pre-show	第52屆金鐘獎星光大道	With Sam Tsen
2017	28th Golden Melody Awards pre-show	第28屆金曲獎星光大道	With Dennis Au
2018	29th Golden Melody Awards pre-show	第29屆金曲獎星光大道	With Dennis Au
2019	30th Golden Melody Awards	第30屆金曲獎頒獎典禮	
2020	55th Golden Bell Awards	第55屆金鐘獎	With Crowd Lu
2021	32nd Golden Melody Awards	第32屆金曲獎	
2023	60th Golden Horse Awards	第60屆金馬獎	

=== Television series ===
Year	English title	Original title	Role	Notes/Ref.
2011	Happy Dandelion	幸福蒲公英		Guest appearance
2013	Borrow Your Love	借用一下你的愛	Supervisor	Guest appearance
2013	PM10-AM03		Café employee	Guest appearance
2015	Love More	愛情多一口		Guest appearance
2024	GG Precinct	正港分局	Li Shu-fen	TBA

=== Film ===
Year	English title	Original title	Role	Notes
2012	Silent Code	BBS鄉民的正義	Hui's classmate	
2021	Man in Love	當男人戀愛時	Yaya	Special appearance

=== Music video appearances ===
Year	Artist	Song title
2012	Lotus Wang	"Show Me the Money"
2020	The Chairman	"Funny Bone"

== Discography ==
=== Studio albums ===
Title	Album details	Track listing
The Beauty Duckling 美小鴨	Released: 25 August 2017; Label: Universal Music Taiwan; Formats: CD, digital download	Track listing: 1. 美小鴨; 2. 晨之歌; 3. 賴床公主; 4. 倒霉農場; 5. 吃點心; 6. 戀愛大作戰; 7. 全都給你了; 8. 羅賓漢
29	Released: 21 August 2020; Label: Universal Music Taiwan; Formats: CD, digital download	Track listing: 1. 巴豆痛; 2. 讓我們在一起吧; 3. 一號表情; 4. 搬家; 5. 不算是完美; 6. 偶爾偷懶; 7. 不要Lu; 8. 原色; 9. 給妹妹; 10. 尚美麗的情歌

=== Extended plays ===
Title	Album details	Track listing
Legs of Lulu LULU, 腿	Released: 5 May 2016; Label: Universal Music Taiwan; Formats: CD, digital download	Track listing: 1. 腿之歌; 2. 好喜歡你; 3. もものうた
Yes 可以	Released: 22 December 2017; Label: Universal Music Taiwan; Formats: CD, digital download	Track listing: 1. 可以; 2. 星星棉花糖

=== Collaborative singles ===
Year	Title	Notes
2016	"Xi Ha Zhuang Jiao Qing 嘻哈庄腳情"	With Nine One One
2016	"Happy Family 全家福"	With Lai Ci-hong
2016	"A Home For Them 給牠一個家"	With various artists
2017	"Wo Shuo Bao Bei 我說寶貝"	With A Da
2020	"Funny Bone 好笑神"	With The chairman

== Theater ==
Year	English title	Original title
2019–2022	Roommates	單身租隊友

== Awards and nominations ==
Year	Award	Category	Nominated work	Result
2015	50th Golden Bell Awards	Best Host in a Variety Show	Hot Door Night	Nominated
2017	52nd Golden Bell Awards	Best Host in a Variety Show	Hot Door Night	Nominated
2017	52nd Golden Bell Awards	Best Host in a Children Show	Magical DoReMi	Nominated
2018	53rd Golden Bell Awards	Best Host in a Variety Show	Hope Star	Nominated
2019	54th Golden Bell Awards	Best Host in a Variety Show	Hot Door Night	Nominated
2019	54th Golden Bell Awards	Best Host in a Variety Show	Jungle Voice	Nominated
2020	55th Golden Bell Awards	Best Host in a Variety Show	Hot Door Night	Nominated
2022	57th Golden Bell Awards	Best Host in a Variety Show	Hot Door Night	Nominated
2022	57th Golden Bell Awards	Best Host in a Variety Show	Wedding Singer	Won
2023	58th Golden Bell Awards	Best Host in a Variety Show	Hot Door Night	Won
2023	58th Golden Bell Awards	Best Host in a Variety Show	Music Viva Viva 5	Nominated
