= Tien Hsin =

Taiwanese actress, television host and singer

- 天心
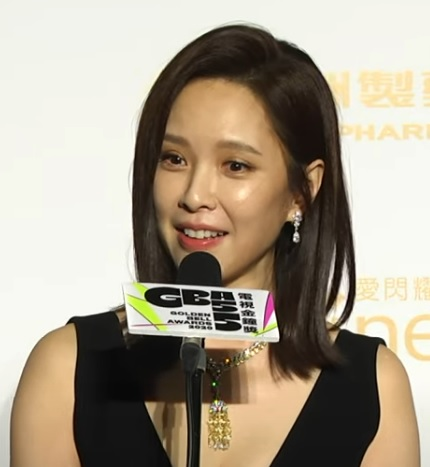
- Tien Hsin at the 55th Golden Bell Awards in September 2020
- Born: Wu Tien-hsin; November 11, 1975 (age 50); Taipei County, Taiwan
- Other name: Tian Xin
- Education: Hwa Kang Arts School
- Occupations: Actress, television host, singer
- Years active: 1993—present
- Spouse: Kim Yeong-min (m. 2016)

Stage name
- Chinese: 天心
- Hanyu Pinyin: Tiān Xīn

Birth name
- Chinese: 吳天心
- Hanyu Pinyin: Wú Tiānxīn

Tien Hsin (Chinese: 天心; born Wu Tien-hsin on November 11, 1975) is a Taiwanese actress, television host and singer. She won a Golden Bell Award for Best Leading Actress in a Television Series in 2011 for the drama series Who's the One.

== Personal life ==
She has been married to South Korean photographer Kim Yeong-min since 2016.

== Selected filmography ==
=== Television series ===
Year	English title	Original title	Role	Notes
1993	Zhi Sheng Xian Shi	至勝鮮師		
2002	Come to My Place	來我家吧！	Cher	
2002	The Legendary Siblings 2	絕世雙驕	Yuwen Shuang	
2003	The Pawnshop No. 8	第8號當舖	Chen Ching	
2008	Wish To See You Again	這裡發現愛	Dream lover	Special appearance
2011	Who's the One	我的完美男人	Shen Jo-wei	
2012	Gung Hay Fat Choy	我們發財了	Liang Tzu-ching	
2013	A Good Wife	親愛的，我愛上別人了	Shen Yi-chen	
2013	Marry or Not	結婚好嗎？	Yang Ya-chen	
2016	A Touch of Green	一把青	Chou Wei-hsun	
2017	Magic Showdown	魔幻對決	Yen Ke-yin	
2018-2019	Pretty Man	國民老公	Han Ruchu	2 seasons; webseries
2019	Best Interest	最佳利益	Fang Cheng	
2019	Triad Princess	極道千金	Sophia Kwong	Netflix series
2021	The Making of an Ordinary Woman 2	俗女養成記2	Hung Yu-hsuan	
2022	Women in Taipei	台北女子圖鑑	Lin I-shan's aunt	
TBA	Best Interest 2	最佳利益2 - 決戰利益	Fang Cheng	
TBA	Bloody Smart	聰明鎮		
TBA	Q18	—N/a		

=== Film ===
Year	English title	Original title	Role	Notes
1994	Peony Pavilion	我的美麗與哀愁	Mi-mi	
1995	Yes, Sir 5	報告班長5：女兵報到	Wu Tien-hsin	
1997	Fight or Die	英雄向後轉	Pai Ya-li	
1998	Woman Soup	女湯	Tao Shui-lien	
1999	My Loving Trouble 7	我愛777	Candy	
1999	Kavalan	少年噶瑪蘭		Voice
2000	The Duel	決戰紫禁之巔	Jade	
2005	Catch	國士無雙	Star	
2006	Lethal Angels	魔鬼天使	Hong	
2013	Forever Love	阿嬤的夢中情人	Jin Yue-feng	
2015	King of Mahjong	麻雀王		Special appearance
2015	Detective Gui	宅女偵探桂香	Maggie Wei	
2015	Office	華麗上班族	Tang Kah-ling	
2016	Unexpected Love	閉嘴！愛吧	Agent	Unreleased
2019	Mom, I Have No Time	媽，我沒時間		
2022	Deleted	越界	Teh Shanshan	

=== Host ===
==== Variety show ====
Network	English title	Original title	Notes
CTS	Comedian Bump Earth	笑星撞地球	With Jacky Wu and Alex Dung
CTS	The Winner	天生贏家	With Timothy Chao and Doris Kuang
Azio TV	Johnny's Power		

==== Event ====
Year	English title	Original title	Notes
2006	41st Golden Bell Awards	第41屆金鐘獎頒獎典禮	With Matilda Tao
2008	43rd Golden Bell Awards	第43屆金鐘獎頒獎典禮	With Jacky Wu and Patty Hou
2012	23rd Golden Melody Awards	第23屆金曲獎頒獎典禮	With Mickey Huang

=== Music video appearances ===
Year	Artist	Song title
1991	Ukulele	"Confession"
1997	Liu Han-chiang	"Wan Qiu De Feng"
2006	Tanya Chua	"Beautiful Love"
2008	Stanley Huang	"Tower of Babel"
2012	Evan Yo	"Big Girl Small Boy"
2013	Pu Hsueh-liang	"Hong Dong Wu Lin Yi Shou Ge"
2019	Fish Leong	"Sub-lover"
2019	Ding Dang	"Misunderstanding"

== Discography ==
=== Studio albums ===
Title	Album details
Take a Walk 散散步也可以	Released: 1993; Label: Bao Lien Records; Formats: CD
Play 玩耍	Released: 1995; Label: Country Records; Formats: CD

== Theater ==
Year	English title	Original title
1998	The Personals	徵婚啟事
2009	The 39 Steps	步步驚笑
2020	The 39 Steps	步步驚笑

== Published works ==
- 天心美容湯. Sunbright Publishing. 1999. ISBN 9789576674730.

== Awards and nominations ==
Year	Award	Category	Nominated work	Result
2011	46th Golden Bell Awards	Best Leading Actress in a Television Series	Who's the One	Won
2014	49th Golden Bell Awards	Best Leading Actress in a Television Series	A Good Wife	Nominated
2016	51st Golden Bell Awards	Best Supporting Actress in a Television Series	A Touch of Green	Nominated
2016	21st Asian Television Awards	Best Actress in a Supporting Role	A Touch of Green	Won
2020	55th Golden Bell Awards	Best Leading Actress in a Television Series	Best Interest	Nominated
