= 53rd Golden Bell Awards =

- Date: October 6, 2018; 17:00 NST (red carpet); 19:00 NST (awards ceremony)
- Site: Sun Yat-sen Memorial Hall, Taipei, Taiwan
- Hosted by: Mickey Huang; Patty Hou
- Preshow hosts: Ethan Liu; Mary Wu
- Organized by: Bureau of Audiovisual and Music Industry Development

Television coverage
- Network: Sanlih E-Television; Public Television Service

The 53rd Golden Bell Awards (Chinese: 第53屆金鐘獎) was held on October 6, 2018, at the Sun Yat-sen Memorial Hall in Taipei, Taiwan. The ceremony was televised by Sanlih E-Television and Public Television Service. Mickey Huang and Patty Hou were the hosts for the night.

== Winners and nominees ==
Below is the list of winners and nominees for the main categories.

Best Television Series: A Boy Named Flora A (植劇場-花甲男孩轉大人); Songs and the City (城市情歌); Roseki (客家劇場–台北歌手); Wake Up 2; Age Of Rebellion (翻牆的記憶)	Best Miniseries: Days We Stared at the Sun II (他們在畢業的前一天爆炸2); HIStory2: Crossing the Line (HIStory2 - 越界); Far and Away - Lover's Choices (外鄉女-愛人的選擇); Ghost High School (恐怖高校劇場之直播中二間)
Best Television Film: Where the Sun Don't Shine (公視人生劇展-青苔); Ping Pong (公視新創電影-乒乓); Lovely Sundays (公視學生劇展第一廣場); A-Tsuí & Kok-Siông (阿水和國祥); Mermaid Whispering (海•人•魚)	Best Variety Show: Yesterday Once More (閃亮的年代); Top Sound Microphone (大聲 MY 客風); Super Entourage (小明星大跟班); Bing Bing Show (冰冰 SHOW); Variety Get Together (綜藝大集合)
Best Reality or Game Show: Genius Go Go Go (天才衝衝衝); Tahu (Tahu 生火吧); A Wonderful Word (一字千金); Mr. Player (綜藝玩很大); Guess Who 9 (誰來晚餐9)	
Best Leading Actor in a Television Series: Crowd Lu — A Boy Named Flora A (植劇場-花甲男孩轉大人); Lego Lee — Wake Up 2; Derek Chang — My Dear Boy; Mo Tzu-yi — Roseki (客家劇場–台北歌手); Jag Huang — Wake Up 2	Best Leading Actress in a Television Series: Huang Peijia — Roseki (客家劇場–台北歌手); Summer Meng — Wake Up 2; Sun Ke-fang — What She Put on the Table (植劇場-五味八珍的歲月); Vera Yen — A Boy Named Flora A (植劇場-花甲男孩轉大人); Yen Yi-wen — We Are All Family (我綿一家人)
Best Supporting Actor in a Television Series: Liu Kuan-ting — A Boy Named Flora A (植劇場-花甲男孩轉大人); Wu Nien-hsuan — Age Of Rebellion (翻牆的記憶); Chen Chia-kuei — Roseki (客家劇場–台北歌手); Ivan Chen — Age Of Rebellion (翻牆的記憶); Tsai Chen-nan — A Boy Named Flora A (植劇場-花甲男孩轉大人)	Best Supporting Actress in a Television Series: Yang Shiau-li — Roseki (客家劇場–台北歌手); Chiang Yi-chen — A Boy Named Flora A (植劇場-花甲男孩轉大人); Tiffany Pan — Life As It Is (清風無痕); Aggie Hsieh — Meet Me @ 1006 (1006的房客); Hsieh Ying-hsuan — A Boy Named Flora A (植劇場-花甲男孩轉大人)
Best Newcomer in a Television Series: Crowd Lu — A Boy Named Flora A (植劇場-花甲男孩轉大人); Wayne Sung — Age Of Rebellion (翻牆的記憶); Shiny Yao — Age Of Rebellion (翻牆的記憶); Michael Chang — Age Of Rebellion (翻牆的記憶); Sherry Peng — Roseki (客家劇場–台北歌手)	
Best Leading Actor in a Miniseries or Television Film: Lan Wei-hua — Where the Sun Don't Shine (公視人生劇展-青苔); Edison Song — Ghost High School (恐怖高校劇場之直播中二間); Wu Chien-ho — Days We Stared at the Sun II (他們在畢業的前一天爆炸2); Chen Bor-jeng — A-Tsuí & Kok-Siông (阿水和國祥); Chang Han — The Stranger (公視學生劇展-一步之遙)	Best Leading Actress in a Miniseries or Television Film: Lu Yi-ching — A-Tsuí & Kok-Siông (阿水和國祥); Fang Yu-hsin — Far and Away - Lover's Choices (外鄉女-愛人的選擇); Amber An — Nguyen Thi Bich Hoa and Her Two Men (華視金選劇場-阮氏碧花與她的兩個男人); Hsieh Ying-hsuan — The Juice Dealer (公視新創電影-錢莊聽來的事); Aviis Zhong — The Substitute (替身)
Best Supporting Actor in a Miniseries or Television Film: Hsi Hsiang — Nguyen Thi Bich Hoa and Her Two Men (華視金選劇場-阮氏碧花與她的兩個男人); Edison Song — Days We Stared at the Sun II (他們在畢業的前一天爆炸2); Lee Fu-chiun — The Stranger (公視學生劇展-一步之遙); Jay Shih — Ching's Way Homes (阿青,回家了); Lan Wei-hua — Ping Pong (公視新創電影-乒乓)	Best Supporting Actress in a Miniseries or Television Film: Liao Yi-ling — Far and Away - Third Force (外鄉女-第三力量); Wang Chuan — Ching's Way Homes (阿青,回家了); Iris Hu — Days We Stared at the Sun II (他們在畢業的前一天爆炸2); Ruby Zhan — Ghost High School (恐怖高校劇場之直播中二間); Iain Lu — Where the Sun Don't Shine (公視人生劇展-青苔)
Best Newcomer in a Miniseries or Television Film: Iain Lu — Where the Sun Don't Shine (公視人生劇展-青苔); Cristina Diego Ponce — Lovely Sundays (公視學生劇展第一廣場); Patty Lee — Mermaid Whispering (海•人•魚); Iris Hu — Days We Stared at the Sun II (他們在畢業的前一天爆炸2); Hsia Teng-hung — Days We Stared at the Sun II (他們在畢業的前一天爆炸2)	
Best Host for a Variety Show: Woo Gwa, Aaron Chan and Cheryl Hsieh — Variety Get Together (綜藝大集合); Ma Shih-fang and Tao Chuan-cheng — Yesterday Once More (閃亮的年代); Chang Fei — Chang Fei's Big Shot Variety Show (綜藝菲常讚); Hsu Hsiao-shun — Crazy Show (瘋神無雙); Mickey Huang and Lulu — Hope Star (希望之星)	Best Host for a Reality or Game Show: Jacky Wu and Kid — Mr. Player (綜藝玩很大); Tony Sun, Zax Wang and Jason Hsu — The Hunger Games (飢餓遊戲); Woo Gwa and Maria — Witty Star (歡樂智多星); Hsu Nai-lin and Sam Tseng — Genius Go Go Go (天才衝衝衝); Afalean Lufiz — Kai Hero (Kai 試英雄)
Lifetime Achievement Award: Kao Cheng-peng; Liu Li-li	
