= Sam Tseng =

Taiwanese television host and actor

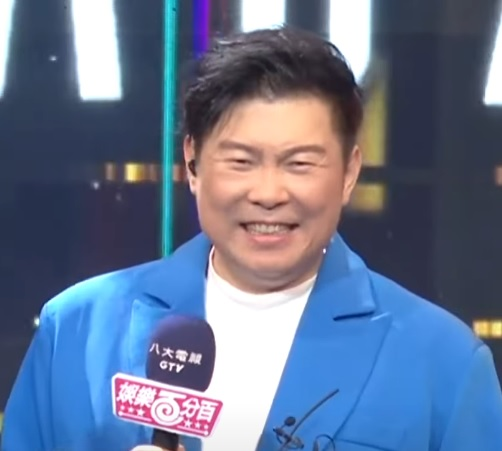
- Tseng in October 2022
- Born: January 29, 1968 (age 58); Neipu, Pingtung County, Taiwan
- Other names: Tseng Kuo-cheng; Zeng Guocheng
- Education: Shih Hsin University (BA)
- Occupations: Television host, actor
- Years active: 1990-present
- Spouse: Kate Liu (m. 2005)
- Children: 2

Chinese name
- Traditional Chinese: 曾國城
- Simplified Chinese: 曾国城
- Hanyu Pinyin: Zēng Guóchéng
- Hokkien POJ: Chan Kok-siâⁿ
- Website: www.samtseng.com.tw

Sam Tseng (Chinese: 曾國城; Pe̍h-ōe-jī: Chan Kok-siâⁿ, born January 29, 1968) is a Taiwanese television host and actor.

Tseng graduated from Shih Hsin School of Journalism and entered the entertainment scene in 1990 as an actor. His career took off during the late nineties, when he began hosting treasure hunting game show Golden Legend with Lillian Wang, and variety show Taiwan Homerun, alongside Hsu Nai-lin.

In addition to his television work, he has appeared in many well-received stage productions by Ping-Fong Acting Troupe and Godot Theatre Company.

In 2005, he married Kate Liu, a Chinese Australian who is ten years his junior. The couple have a son and a daughter.

== Filmography ==
=== Variety show ===
Network	English title	Original title	Notes
EBC Variety	National Star Raiders	全民星攻略	
TTV	Six-year National Development Plan	刮目相看 六年國建	
TTV	Huan Le Dui Dui Peng	歡樂對對碰	
TTV	Amazing Friday	驚艷星期五	
TTV	Tiger vs Tiger	台灣虎怕虎	
TTV	Taiwan Homerun	台灣紅不讓	
TTV	Weekend Show	周末晚點名	
TTV	Midnight Show	午夜晚點名	
TTV	Happy!	快樂大聯盟	
TTV	Happy Day	天天樂翻天	
CTV	Youth Express	青春快遞	
CTV	Huan Le Peng Peng Hu	歡樂碰碰胡	
CTV	Red Versus White	紅白勝利	
CTV	Show Biz Whiz	全能綜藝通	
CTV	Sunday Show	週日大精采	
CTV	Variety Camp	綜藝大本營	
CTV	Quanneng Meishi Xiu	全能美食秀	
CTV	Super Citizen	最強大國民	
CTV	Show Winner	萬秀大勝利	
CTV	No Play No Life	沒玩沒了	
CTS	Leçons d' Amour	戀愛講義	
CTS	IQ Go	—N/a	
CTS	Beautiful World	美麗心世界	
CTS	It's Love	這就叫做愛	
CTS	Power Sunday	Power Sunday－綜藝百分百	
CTS	Survivor of Palace	後宮生還戰	
CTS	Genius Go Go Go	天才衝衝衝	2006—present
PTS	A Wonderful Word	一字千金	
MOMO Kids	PK King	小學PK王	
Star Chinese Channel	IQ Challenge	IQ大挑戰	
Star Chinese Channel	Lady Commander	一袋女王	2010—present
SET Metro	TV Bank	電視大銀行	
SET Metro	Delicious Food All Over the World	美食大三通	
SET Metro	Free Style	硬是要鬥牛	
SET Metro	Treasure Hunter	冒险奇兵	
SET Metro	Good Show	至尊美食王	
SET Metro	Super Idol	超級偶像	
SET Metro	Stylish Man - The Chef	型男大主廚	2006—present
SET Taiwan	Happy Family Plan	幸福家庭計畫	
CTi Entertainment	Big Rich	小氣大財神	
CTi Entertainment	Wu Jian Dao Bu Dao	無間道不道	
CTi Entertainment	Super Big Boss	超級大頭目	
CTi Entertainment	Poker Lord	財神大地主	
TVBS-G	Why	男人杯杯Why	
Super TV	Nine Point Onestick	九點一级棒	
Super TV	Comedy Private Limited	喜劇有限公司	
Super TV	Golden Legend	黄金傳奇	
Super TV	National Queen	國民女王	
Super TV	Young	春猛回頭	
GTV Variety Show	Night Club	八大夜總會	
GTV Variety Show	Treasures Experts	寶物博很大	
Fast Wing	Dream Tonight	今夜入夢来	
Videoland	Kid's Busy	小孩很忙	
Videoland	Success	城功富產科	
Videoland	Perfect Human	玩美的人類	
Mediacorp	World Kitchen	美味天王	
Mediacorp	Celebrity Tic-Tac-Toe	名人Tic Tac Toe	
Mediacorp	3-Plus-1	3菜1湯	
Mediacorp	Don't Forget the Lyrics! (Chinese version)	我要唱下去	
Mediacorp	3-Plus-1 S2	3菜1湯 II	
Mediacorp	3-Plus-1 S3	3菜1湯 III	
Mediacorp	3-Plus-1 S4	3菜一湯 IV	
Mediacorp	Men's Talk	3个男人1张口	

==== Event ====
Year	English title	Original title	Notes
2010	45th Golden Bell Awards	第45屆金鐘獎頒獎典禮	With Fang Fangfang
2010	12th Taipei Film Awards	第12屆台北電影獎頒獎典禮	With Patty Hou
2012	47th Golden Bell Awards	第47屆金鐘獎頒獎典禮	With Janet Hsieh
2012	14th Taipei Film Awards	第14屆台北電影獎頒獎典禮	With Vega Tsai
2013	15th Taipei Film Awards	第15屆台北電影獎頒獎典禮	With Annie Chen
2014	49th Golden Bell Awards	第49屆金鐘獎頒獎典禮	With Selina Jen
2020	55th Golden Bell Awards	第55屆金鐘獎頒獎典禮	With Aaron Yan
2022	57th Golden Bell Awards (television show categories)	第57屆金鐘獎頒獎典禮 (節目類)	With Jesse Tang

=== Television series ===
Year	English title	Original title	Role	Notes
1993	Rumble Ages	烈火青春		
1995-1998	We Are Family	我們一家都是人	Tseng Chien-jen (Armani) / Pang Gonggong	
1996	Chunfeng Shaonian	春風少年		
1998	Gods Are Watching from Above	舉頭三尺有神明-我是偷渡客	Ho Ching	
2000	Zhen Nu Lie Nu Hao Fang Nu	貞女烈女豪放女		
2001	Marmalade Boy	橘子醬男孩	Ren	
2001	Taiwan Paranormal Events	台灣靈異事件		
2003	My Cinderella from Sky	天上掉下個林妹妹	Kong Shoudao	
2003	The Rose	薔薇之戀	Director Tsai	Cameo
2004	Women Are to Be Rich	女人要有錢		
2004	I Love My Wife	安室愛美惠	Tseng Fu-chi	
2004	My Puppy Lover	我的寵物老公	Chi Si-fan	
2005	Star	八星報喜		
2005	Spring Light of the Grass Mountain	草山春暉	Kao Ming-chih	
2009	Marriage of Three Daughters	女仨的婚事	Liu Hsien-pin	
2012	Confucius	智勝鮮師	Cheng Chih-sheng / Confucius	
2019	Girl's Power	女兵日記女力報到	Tseng Kuo-cheng	Cameo
2020	U Motherbaker	我的婆婆怎麼那麼可愛	Tseng Kuo-cheng	Cameo

=== Film ===
Year	English title	Original title	Role	Notes/Ref.
2000	The Emperor's New Groove	—N/a	Emperor Kuzco	Taiwanese release, voice
2007	Ratatouille	—N/a	Remy	Taiwanese release, voice
2010	Comedy Makes You Cry	拍賣春天	Diamond	
2011	It's a Great, Great World	大世界	Tiger	Cameo
2012	My Ghost Partner	人鬼拍檔		Cameo
2020	Acting Out Of Love	練愛iNG	Himself	Cameo
2024	Yen and Ai-Lee	小雁與吳愛麗	Ren	

== Theater ==
English title	Original title
Can Three Make It	三人行不行
Spring Summer Autumn And Winter	蠢嘎揪疼
Shamlet	莎姆雷特
Tai Ping Tian Guo	太平天國
The Half-Mile Great Wall	半里長城
Elastic Zone	鬆緊地帶
Nation Rescue, Ltd	救國株式會社
Far Away From Home	西出陽關
The Aurora Borealis	北極之光
Notice from a Bachelorette	徵婚啟事 浪漫版
The Goodbye Girl	再見女郎
We're No Angels	冒牌天使
Art	—N/a
Kao! Ba	靠!爸
Love Ya Mom	愛呀，我的媽！
Mr. Right Wanted	徵婚啟事

== Published works ==
- Tseng, Sam (2002). Zeng Guo Cheng Zhi Chuan Qi Huang Jin Han. Taipei: Star East Press. ISBN 986-7848-03-9.
- Tseng, Sam (2007). Zeng Guo Cheng、Chen Qiao En Zhi Mao Xian Gong Lue: Tuan Kang Wan Quan Shou Ce. New Taipei City: Fundation. ISBN 9789868353718.

== Awards and nominations ==
Year	Award	Category	Nominated work	Result
2006	41st Golden Bell Awards	Best Leading Actor in a Television Series	Star	Nominated
2006	41st Golden Bell Awards	Best Host in a Variety Show	Big Rich	Won
2011	46th Golden Bell Awards	Best Host in a Comprehensive Show	Stylish Man - The Chef	Won
2014	49th Golden Bell Awards	Best Host in a Comprehensive Show	Stylish Man - The Chef	Nominated
2014	49th Golden Bell Awards	Best Host in a Comprehensive Show	Genius Go Go Go	Won
2015	50th Golden Bell Awards	Best Host in a Comprehensive Show	A Wonderful Word	Nominated
2016	51st Golden Bell Awards	Best Host in a Comprehensive Show	A Wonderful Word	Nominated
2016	51st Golden Bell Awards	Best Host in a Comprehensive Show	Genius Go Go Go	Nominated
2017	52nd Golden Bell Awards	Best Host in a Reality or Game Show	A Wonderful Word	Nominated
2018	53rd Golden Bell Awards	Best Host in a Reality or Game Show	Genius Go Go Go	Nominated
2019	54th Golden Bell Awards	Best Host in a Variety Show	Lady Commander	Nominated
2020	55th Golden Bell Awards	Best Host in a Variety Show	Lady Commander	Nominated
2020	55th Golden Bell Awards	Best Host in a Reality or Game Show	National Star Raiders	Won
2021	56th Golden Bell Awards	Best Host in a Reality or Game Show	A Wonderful Word	Won
2022	57th Golden Bell Awards	Best Host in a Reality or Game Show	National Star Raiders	Nominated
2022	57th Golden Bell Awards	Best Host in a Variety Show	Stylish Man - The Chef	Nominated
2023	58th Golden Bell Awards	Best Host in a Reality or Game Show	A Wonderful Word	Won
2024	61st Golden Horse Awards	Best Supporting Actor	Yen and Ai-Lee	Pending
