= Kuo Tzu-chien =

Taiwanese comedian, host and actor

- 郭子乾
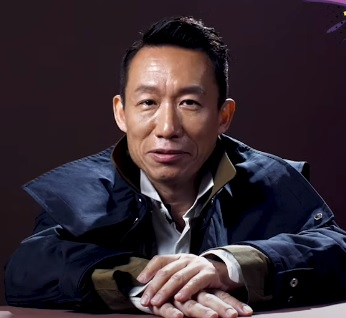
- Kuo in September 2019
- Born: March 14, 1964 (age 62); Puli, Nantou, Taiwan
- Other names: Guo Ziqian; Kuo Tze-cheng; Guo Tzu-chien
- Education: China Maritime College (BS)
- Occupations: Comedian, host, actor
- Years active: 1987-present
- Spouses: Lin Cai-hong (m. 1995; div. 1995) Wei Yu-lian (m. 1999)
- Children: 1

Chinese name
- Traditional Chinese: 郭子乾
- Simplified Chinese: 郭子乾
Transcriptions
Standard Mandarin
- Hanyu Pinyin: Guō Zi Qián
Southern Min
- Hokkien POJ: Koeh Chú-khiân

Kuo Tzu-chien (Chinese: 郭子乾; Pe̍h-ōe-jī: Koeh Chú-khiân; born March 14, 1964) is a Taiwanese comedian, host and actor.

== Personal life ==
Kuo is married with a son. His first marriage in 1995 lasted only 3 months.

Former Mayor of Hsinchu City Lin Junq-tzer is his older cousin.

In 2012, Kuo launched a claim for 460 million won in compensation against the Ramada Hotel and Suites Seoul in Namdaemun after he suffered hot water burns from a defective electric kettle which bottom part was already broken before he checked into the hotel. He was on a holiday trip in Seoul with his wife and son in January 2012 when the incident happened. His claim was subsequently dismissed by the Seoul Central District Court in August 2013. In reaction, Kuo initiated a series of protests with a number of Taiwanese television personalities and filed a petition to the Taiwan Human Rights Association that had garnered 10,000 signatures.

In 2015, the actress Chiang Tsu-ping played Kuo Tzu-chien's daughter in the eight-o'clock drama "Love You Unconditionally." In the scene, Kuo Tzu-chien was supposed to slap Chiang Tsu-ping, but he apparently miscontrolled the force, causing a mild concussion and inner ear imbalance in Chiang Tsu-ping, forcing her to rest for a year. However, Chiang Tsu-ping still suffered from residual health problems. Not only could she never exercise again, she sometimes felt shaky while sitting at home. At her worst, she couldn't even squat or run, which was undoubtedly a huge blow.

In June 2021, Kuo was embroiled in the Taipei Good Liver Clinic vaccination scandal where he was in a group of "wealthy and famous" people who received COVID-19 vaccines at the same time as the designated priority groups such as frontline medical personnel, police and emergency-response workers, among others.

== Selected filmography ==
=== Television series ===
Year	English title	Original title	Role	Notes/Ref.
1989	Happy Family	全家福－ 讀者來函	Plumber	Cameo
1991	Jia You Xian Qi	家有仙妻	Thief	Cameo
1994	The Heaven Sword and Dragon Saber	倚天屠龍記	Hu Qingniu	
1997	4 Daughters	四千金	Old Man	
2002	Perfect Neighbors	親戚不計較	Kuo Ying-jun	
2005	Taipei Family	住左邊住右邊	Kuo Fu-qian	
2006	The Amazing Strategist Liu Bo Wen	神機妙算劉伯溫·長生劫	Cai Yi-dao	
2007	Brown Sugar Macchiato	黑糖瑪奇朵	Mr. Fei	
2008	Love or Bread	我的億萬麵包	Zeng Huo-shu	
2011	6 Ju Xia Ban	6局下半	Su Zheng-de	
2014	Go, Single Lady	上流俗女	Mr. He	
2014	The X-Dormitory	終極X宿舍	Niu Bao-jie	
2019	The Timeless Virtues	忠孝節義·路遙知馬力	Ding Ba	
2019	Back to Home	月村歡迎你	Kuo Fu-cheng	
2019	Nowhere Man	罪夢者	Yang Wan-li	Netflix series
2020	A Fool Like Me	大林學校	Lin Chien-chih	
2020	Girl's Power	女力報到－最佳拍檔	Han Geng	
2020	Young Days No Fears	我的青春沒在怕	Liao Wan-li	
2020	Non Reading Club	不讀書俱樂部	Shop manager	
2021	Girl's Power	女力報到－愛情公寓	Han Geng	
2021	Guan Yin in My Dream	觀音對我笑	Hsieh Lai-wen	
2021	Gold Leaf	茶金	Chang Fu-chi	
2021	Golden Years	黃金歲月	Hotel owner	Cameo
2022	Lord Jiaqing and The Journey to Taiwan	嘉慶君遊台灣	Liu Yong	
2023	The Searchers	搜尋者		
2024	A Wonderful Journey	華麗計程車行	Asan Ge / Táng-á	
2026	Agent from Above	乩身	Dragon Prince	

=== Film ===
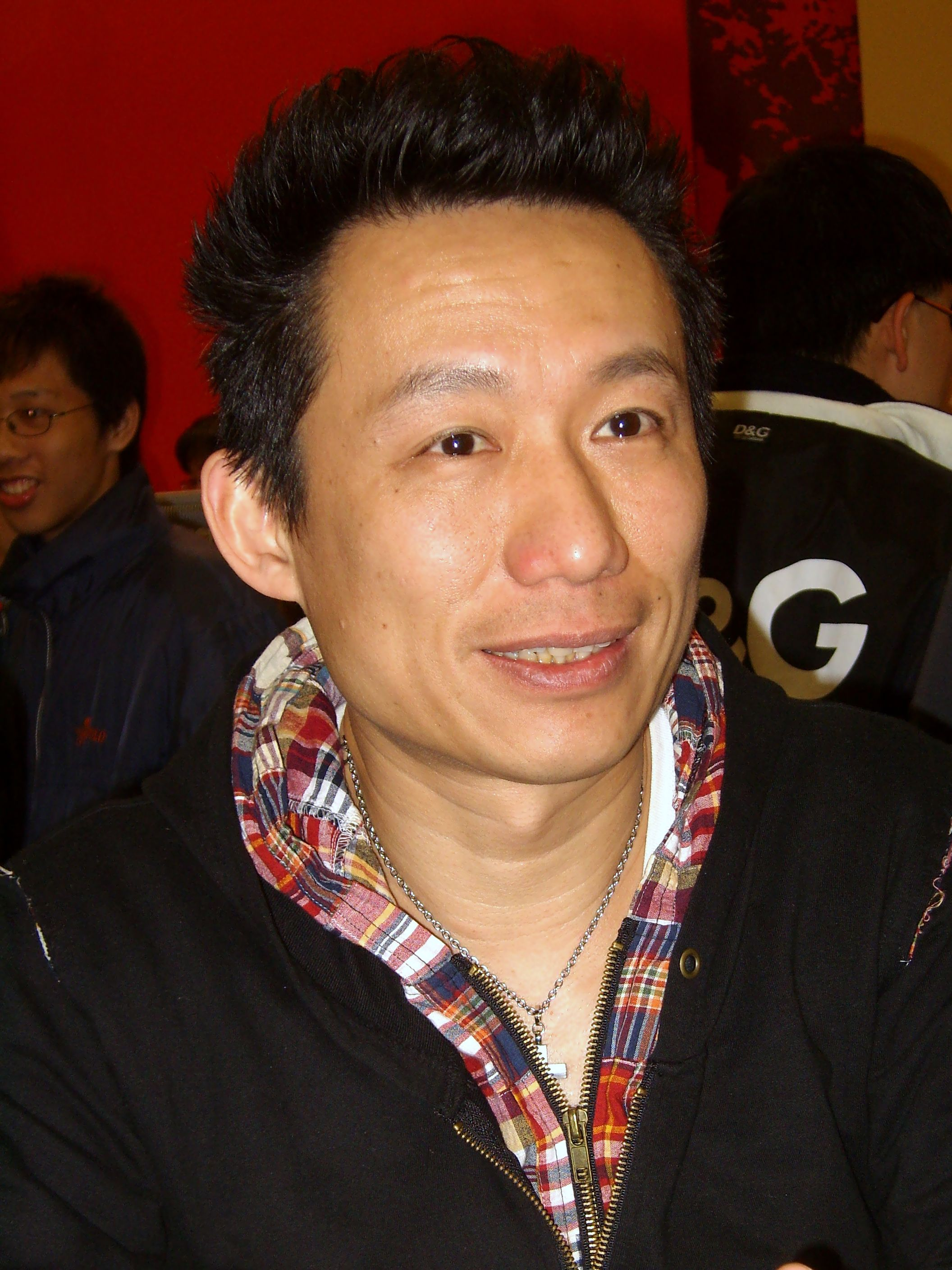
Kuo in 2008

Year	English title	Original title	Role	Notes
1989	Seven Wolves 2	七匹狼2	Tu Qiu-zhi	
1990	Cheng Gong Ling 2: Quan Mian Chu Ji	成功嶺2全面出擊		
1995	The Daughter-in-Law	阿爸的情人		
1995	Trouble Maker	臭屁王	Teacher	Cameo
2004	The Incredibles	—N/a	Buddy Pine / IncrediBoy / Syndrome	Mandarin voiceover (Taiwan version)
2011	Leaving Gracefully	帶一片風景走		
2012	Go Go Daddy	搶救老爸	Wang Tian-cai	
2012	Baseball Love	球愛天空	Lin Yong-shun	
2014	Endless Nights in Aurora	極光之愛	Professor Chen	
2015	Youth Never Returns	既然青春留不住		
2018	About Youth	有一種喜歡	Yuan's Dad	
2019	It's a Mad, Mad, Mad, Mad Show	瘋狂電視台瘋電影	Kuo Tzu-chien	
2023	Xiao Zi	小子		
2023	Miss Shampoo	請問，還有哪裡需要加強	Boss Chuan	

=== Variety and reality show ===
English title	Original title	Notes
Everybody Speaks Nonsense	全民大悶鍋	
Celebrity Imitated Show	全民最大黨	
Three Star	三星報囍	

== Published works ==
- Kuo, Tzu-chien (2008). Jie men jiu ren sheng : Guo Zi Qian live show 解悶救人生！郭子乾Live Show. Taipei: Bookzone. ISBN 9789862160701.
- Kuo, Tzu-chien (2017). Ge shuo de bu shi xing zuo, shi ren ji guan xi 哥說的不是星座，是人際關係. Taipei: Bookzone. ISBN 9789864793273.

== Awards and nominations ==
Year	Award	Category	Nominated work	Result
1995	32nd Golden Horse Awards	Best Supporting Actor	The Daughter-in-Law	Nominated
2003	38th Golden Bell Awards	Best Host for a Variety Show	2100 National Nonsense	Won
2005	40th Golden Bell Awards	Best Host for a Variety Show	Everybody Speaks Nonsense	Nominated
2007	42nd Golden Bell Awards	Best Host for a Variety Show	Everybody Speaks Nonsense	Nominated
2008	43rd Golden Bell Awards	Best Host for a Variety Show	Everybody Speaks Nonsense	Nominated
2009	44th Golden Bell Awards	Best Host for a Variety Show	Everybody Speaks Nonsense	Nominated
2011	46th Golden Bell Awards	Best Actor in a Miniseries or Television Film	6 Ju Xia Ban	Nominated
2016	51st Golden Bell Awards	Best Host for a Variety Show	Three Star	Nominated
2022	57th Golden Bell Awards	Best Leading Actor in a Television Series	Gold Leaf	Nominated
