= 52nd Golden Bell Awards =

2017 Taiwanese television awards

- Date: September 30, 2017
- Site: Sun Yat-sen Memorial Hall, Taipei, Taiwan
- Hosted by: Mickey Huang; Selina Jen
- Preshow hosts: Chen Yung Kang; Lulu Huang Lu
- Organized by: Bureau of Audiovisual and Music Industry Development

Television coverage
- Network: Sanlih E-Television

The 52nd Golden Bell Awards (Mandarin:第52屆金鐘獎) was held on September 30, 2017 at the Sun Yat-sen Memorial Hall in Taipei, Taiwan. The ceremony was televised by Sanlih E-Television. Mickey Huang and Selina Jen hosted the ceremony.

== Winners and nominees ==
Below is the list of winners and nominees for the main categories.

Best Television Series: Close Your Eyes Before It's Dark (植劇場－天黑請閉眼); Abula (阿不拉的三個女人); Game (客家劇場－明天一起去樂園); Love of Sandstorm (植劇場－戀愛沙塵暴); Family Time (酸甜之味)	Best Miniseries: The Teenage Psychic; Far and Away - Dark Beauty (外鄉女-黑美人); The Devil Game (劣人傳之詭計); She's Family (媽媽不見了)
Best Television Film: The Long Goodbye (公視人生劇展－告別); Their Heaven (TMD天堂); Keep Going (公視迷你電影院:一直騎呀一直騎); We Are One (望月); Upstream (濁流)	Best Variety Show: Just Dance (舞力全開); "Fighting Team" (Fighting吧！ 天團); Global Chinese Music (全球中文音樂榜上榜); 100% Entertainment (娛樂百分百); Hot Door Night (綜藝大熱門)
Best Reality or Game Show: Witty Star (歡樂智多星); A Wonderful Word (一字千金榜中榜); The Fantasy Island (奇幻島); The Hunger Games (飢餓遊戲); Mr. Player (綜藝玩很大)	
Best Leading Actor in a Television Series: Liu Te-kai — Never Forget Then (這些年 那些事); Wu Kang-jen — Love of Sandstorm (植劇場－戀愛沙塵暴); Wes — High 5 Basketball (High 5制霸青春); Fan Kuang-yao — Love of Sandstorm (植劇場－戀愛沙塵暴); Lan Cheng-lung — Jiang Teacher, You Talked About Love It (植劇場－姜老師，妳談過戀愛嗎?)	Best Leading Actress in a Television Series: Samantha Ko — Love of Sandstorm (植劇場－戀愛沙塵暴); Queenie Fang — Reborn from the Dust (蘇足); Allison Lin — Love By Design; Rainie Yang — Life Plan A and B; Yang Kuei-mei — Life List (遺憾拼圖)
Best Supporting Actor in a Television Series: Yu An-shun — Abula (阿不拉的三個女人); Chang Ko-chung — Jiang Teacher, You Talked About Love It (植劇場－姜老師，妳談過戀愛嗎?); Greg Hsu — Jiang Teacher, You Talked About Love It (植劇場－姜老師，妳談過戀愛嗎?); Huang Shang-ho — Close Your Eyes Before It's Dark (植劇場－天黑請閉眼); Johnny Lu — Life Plan A and B	Best Supporting Actress in a Television Series: Sun Ke-fang — Close Your Eyes Before It's Dark (植劇場－天黑請閉眼); Ariel Ann — Game (客家劇場－明天一起去樂園); Chen Yu — Love of Sandstorm (植劇場－戀愛沙塵暴); Yu Chiao-hsuan — Reborn from the Dust (蘇足); Liu Yu-tzu — Tonight (今晚，你想點什麼)
Best Newcomer in a Television Series: Chen Yu — Love of Sandstorm (植劇場－戀愛沙塵暴); He Yu-chen — Jiang Teacher, You Talked About Love It (植劇場－姜老師，妳談過戀愛嗎?); Cammy Chiang — Love of Sandstorm (植劇場－戀愛沙塵暴); Ha Xiao-yuan — Family Time (酸甜之味); Sun Ke-fang — Close Your Eyes Before It's Dark (植劇場－天黑請閉眼)	
Best Leading Actor in a Miniseries or Television Film: Fu Meng-po — The Last Verse (最後的詩句); Wu Kang-jen — We Are One (望月); Christopher Lee — The Long Goodbye (公視人生劇展－告別); Alex Ko — Far and Away - Dark Beauty (外鄉女-黑美人); Lan Wei-hua — The Cage (公視學生劇展－鴿籠)	Best Leading Actress in a Miniseries or Television Film: Wen Chen-ling — The Last Verse (最後的詩句); Hsu Wei-ning — Rock Records in Love - Infatuation (滾石愛情故事－鬼迷心竅); Kuo Shu-yao — The Teenage Psychic; Annie Chen — The Long Goodbye (公視人生劇展－告別); Cheryl Yang — Rock Records in Love - New Everlasting Love (滾石愛情故事－新不了情)
Best Supporting Actor in a Miniseries or Television Film: Tsai Chen-nan — She's Family (媽媽不見了); Wu Kun-da — Time to Say Goodbye (愛別離); Kao Meng-chieh — The Last Verse (最後的詩句); Chang Han — Upstream (濁流); Hsieh Fei — Their Heaven (TMD天堂)	Best Supporting Actress in a Miniseries or Television Film: Lee Chien-na — The Teenage Psychic; Chou Heng-yin — Rock Records in Love - Norwegian Forest (滾石愛情故事－挪威的森林); Yang Kuei-mei — She's Family (媽媽不見了); Yang Li-yin — Estranged Father (我的陌生爸爸); Cheng Chia-yu — The Long Goodbye (公視人生劇展－告別)
Best Newcomer in a Miniseries or Television Film: Lin Yu-ting — An Angel at My Table (公視人生劇展─數到十 讓我變成沈曉旭); Lin Sun Yu Hao — Pakeriran (巴克力藍的夏天); Yane Yang — Table (辦桌); Kent Tsai — The Teenage Psychic; Ipun Kanasaw — Pakeriran (巴克力藍的夏天)	
Best Host for a Variety Show: Show Lo and Butterfly Chien — 100% Entertainment; Kid and Butterfly Chien — Sleepless Kidult (18歲不睡); Lulu Huang Lu Zi Yin, Jacky Wu and Chen Han-dian — Hot Door Night (綜藝大熱門); Chen Chao-jung (aka Aaron Chen), Hu Gua, Alex Tung and Cheryl Hiseh — Variety Together (綜藝大集合); Mickey Huang — Global Chinese Music (全球中文音樂榜上榜)	Best Host for a Reality or Game Show: Kid and Jacky Wu — Mr. Player (綜藝玩很大); Vivi Lee and Nikki Shao — League of the Extraordinary Cute Pets (寵物大聯萌); Hu Gua — Witty Star (歡樂智多星); Sam Tseng — A Wonderful Word (一字千金榜中榜); Su Chien-chou and Ting Ching-yi — C for Chinese (國民漢字須知)
Honorary Awards: Lifetime Achievement Award: Lin Fu-ti; Special Contribution Award: Jerry Martinson	Best Sound: Luming Lu, Chien Feng-su — Close Your Eyes Before It's Dark (天黑請閉眼); Wu Bo-chun — Welcome To The Happy Days (五星級魚干女); Li Shou-xin and Chen Zhen-fa — Vulayan (Vulayan圓夢舞台); Chou Cheng, Anu and Chen Yi-wei — Pakeriran (巴克力藍的夏天); Qiu Sheng-yuan, Ye Yue-se, Thomas Foguenne and Tsai Du-Yi — The Last Verse (最後的詩句)
