= Chen Han-dian =

Taiwanese actor, host and comedian

- 陳漢典
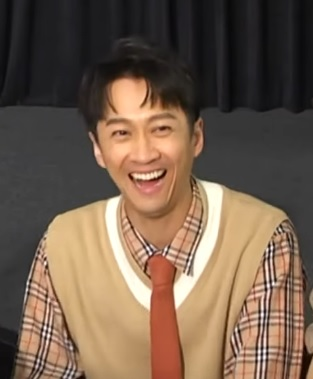
- Chen in October 2022
- Born: July 6, 1984 (age 42); Cishan District, Kaohsiung, Taiwan
- Other names: Hank Chen; Chen Han-tien
- Education: Aletheia University
- Occupations: Actor, host, comedian, singer
- Years active: 2006-present
- Spouse: Lulu Huang Lu Zi Yin (m. 2025)

Chinese name
- Traditional Chinese: 陳漢典
- Simplified Chinese: 陈汉典
- Hanyu Pinyin: Chén Hàn Diǎn
- Jyutping: Can4 Hon3 Din2
- Hokkien POJ: Tân Hàn-tián

Chen Han-dian (Chinese: 陳漢典; Pe̍h-ōe-jī: Tân Hàn-tián; born July 6, 1984), sometimes credited as Hank Chen, is a Taiwanese actor, host and comedian. After winning a talent contest for impersonation on Everybody Speaks Nonsense in 2006, he gained recognition as the sidekick on Kangsi Coming from 2007 onward. Chen's acting credits include films Monga, Love in Disguise, and The Soul of Bread. In 2022, he won the Best Host in a Variety Show at the Golden Bell Awards for co-hosting Hot Door Night.

== Personal life ==
On 20 October 2025, Chen married Lulu Huang Lu Zi Yin.

== Selected filmography ==
=== Television series ===
Year	English title	Original title	Role	Notes
2007	Bull Fighting	鬥牛，要不要	Unemployed man	
2008	Invincible Shan Bao Mei	無敵珊寶妹	Kai Wen	
2008	Rolling Love	翻滾吧！蛋炒飯	Rogue	Cameo
2016	Rock Records in Love	滾石愛情故事-味道	Hsiao-tuan	Chapter: "Scent"
2020	Visitors	訪客	Yu Shang-wen	Film
2021	2049 - The Talk of Love	2049－幸福話術	Fu Da-kai	

=== Film ===
Year	English title	Original title	Role	Notes
2010	Monga	艋舺	Dog boy	
2010	How to Train Your Dragon	—N/a	Hiccup Horrendous Haddock III	Mandarin voiceover (Taiwan)
2010	Love in Disguise	戀愛通告	Wei Zhi-bo	
2011	Jump Ashin!	翻滾吧！阿信	Papaya	
2012	The Soul of Bread	愛的麵包魂	Gao-bing	
2012	Love	—N/a	Xiao Kuan's colleague	Cameo
2012	Double Trouble	寶島雙雄	Tour guide	
2013	My Beautiful Kingdom	我的美麗王國	Peng Hai	
2014	How to Train Your Dragon 2	—N/a	Hiccup Horrendous Haddock III	Mandarin voiceover (Taiwan)
2014	Black & White: The Dawn of Justice	痞子英雄2：黎明再起	Drug addict	Special appearance (deleted scenes)
2016	Rookie Chef	神廚	Lawyer	
2017	Didi's Dream	吃吃的愛	Wang Diandian	
2019	How to Train Your Dragon: The Hidden World	—N/a	Hiccup Horrendous Haddock III	Mandarin voiceover (Taiwan)
2019	It's a Mad, Mad, Mad, Mad Show	瘋狂電視台瘋電影	Himself	
2019	The Gangs, the Oscars, and the Walking Dead	江湖無難事	Dian	

=== Variety and reality show ===
English title	Original title	Notes
Everybody Speaks Nonsenses II – Hot Pot	全民大悶鍋	
Celebrity Imitated Show	全民最大黨	
Guess	我猜我猜我猜猜猜	Guest host
Kangsi Coming	康熙來了	
Dancing Diamond 52	菱格世代DD52	
Hot Door Night	綜藝大熱門	
All Star Sports Day	全明星運動會	
Travel Together	請問 今晚住誰家	
Let's Open	來吧！營業中	Guest

=== Music video appearances ===
Year	Artist	Song title
2008	Claire Kuo	"Da Wan Xiao 大玩笑"
2010	Jody Chiang	"Tan Ko Tan Ko"
2017	Shin	"What the Heck!"
2018	Stefanie Sun	"Chong Yang Qi 充氧期"
2020	The Chairman	"Funny Bone"
2022	Haor	"Be Water, My Friend"

== Discography ==
=== EP ===
Year	Title	Notes
2018	Same Bu Yao	

=== Singles ===
Year	Title	Notes
2012	"The Soul of Bread"	Theme song of The Soul of Bread
2012	"You Are My Baby"	Co-performer; song from The Soul of Bread
2012	"Bread of Love"	Co-performer; song from The Soul of Bread
2012	"Wei Tong Yi Bai Bian"	Song from The Soul of Bread

== Theater ==
Year	English title	Original title
2012	Wedding Memories	女兒紅
2020	Sunset, Sunrise	明星養老院

== Published works ==
- Chen, Han-dian (2012). Mèng xiǎng wǎn diǎn míng : Nà xiē a kā jiào wǒ de shì 夢想晚點名 : 那些A咖教我的事. Taipei: Ping Zhuang Ben. ISBN 9789578038448.

== Awards and nominations ==
Year	Award	Category	Nominated work	Result
2015	50th Golden Bell Awards	Best Host in a Variety Show	Hot Door Night	Nominated
2017	52nd Golden Bell Awards	Best Host in a Variety Show	Hot Door Night	Nominated
2019	54th Golden Bell Awards	Best Host in a Variety Show	Hot Door Night	Nominated
2020	55th Golden Bell Awards	Best Host in a Variety Show	Hot Door Night	Nominated
2022	57th Golden Bell Awards	Best Host in a Variety Show	Hot Door Night	Nominated
2023	58th Golden Bell Awards	Best Host in a Variety Show	Hot Door Night	Won
