= Sandy Wu =

Taiwanese television host

- 吳姍儒
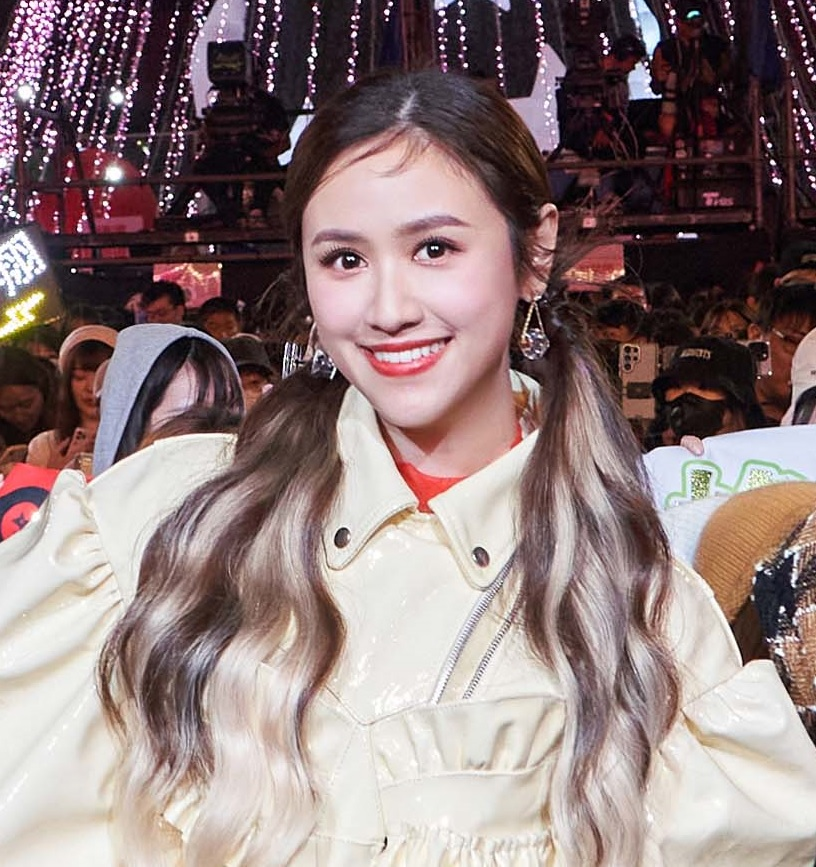
- Wu at 2023 Christmasland in New Taipei City
- Born: August 15, 1990 (age 36); Taipei, Taiwan
- Other name: Wu Shanru
- Education: University of Bothell
- Occupations: Television host, writer, entrepreneur
- Years active: 2013—present
- Spouse: Wang Yang-kai (王陽開) (m. 2022)
- Children: 1
- Parent(s): Jacky Wu; Chang Wei-wei
- Relatives: Ricky Wu (brother)

Sandy Wu (Chinese: 吳姍儒; born August 15, 1990) is a Taiwanese television host, writer, entrepreneur and former junior high school English teacher. A graduate of the University of Washington Bothell, Wu debuted her hosting career with a Yahoo! entertainment news webshow in 2013 and is a three-time Golden Bell Award winner. She is the eldest daughter of host and singer Jacky Wu.

== Selected filmography ==
=== Variety show ===
Network	English title	Original title	Notes
CTi Variety	Super Entourage	小明星大跟班	With Jacky Wu
PTS, Yahoo! TV	100 Calls	一呼百應	With Mickey Huang
EBC	Half and Half	2分之一強	With Vincent Liang
PTS, Yahoo! TV	36 Questions	36題愛上你	With Aaron Yan and Jesse Tang
Yahoo! TV	Yahoo! Entertainment	Yahoo娛樂爆	With Leilei

== Published works ==
- 我的存在本來就值得青睞. Sun Color Culture. 2020. ISBN 9789576582929.

== Awards and nominations ==
Year	Award	Category	Nominated work	Result
2016	51st Golden Bell Awards	Best Host in a Variety Show	Super Entourage	Won
2019	54th Golden Bell Awards	Best Host in a Reality or Game Show	100 Calls	Won
2020	55th Golden Bell Awards	Best Host in a Reality or Game Show	100 Calls (season 2)	Nominated
2021	56th Golden Bell Awards	Best Host in a Variety Show	36 Questions	Won
2023	58th Golden Bell Awards	Best Host in a Variety Show	Super Entourage	Nominated
