= Mark Selikoff =

American-born Taiwanese entertainer

Mark Morris Selikoff
- Born: Mark Morris Selikoff; July 23, 1969; Edina, Minnesota, U.S.
- Died: October 25, 2012 (aged 43); Taoyuan, Taiwan
- Other name: Shi Make (石馬克)
- Occupations: Entertainer; English teacher
- Years active: c. 1997–2006
- Spouse: Huang Ying-hui
- Children: 2

Mark Morris Selikoff (July 23, 1969 – October 25, 2012), known professionally in Taiwan as Shi Make (Chinese: 石馬克), was an American-born Taiwanese entertainer from Minnesota. Known for his shaved head and muscular physique, he was a frequent guest on Taiwanese variety shows such as Kangsi Coming, Celebrity Sports Day (大明星運動會), Everybody Talks Nonsense (全民大悶鍋), and The World is Different (世界大不同).

== Life ==
Selikoff came to Taiwan alone and lived there for about 16 years, primarily working as an English teacher and a television personality. His fluency in Mandarin and his on-screen presence made him a regular guest on several variety shows, with his appearances on Kangsi Coming being the most well-known to audiences. He married Huang Ying-hui, with whom he had a son and a daughter. His wife is a Taiwanese indigenous person from the Tao's Yuren (Fisherman) tribe on Orchid Island.

=== Accident and long-term illness ===
==== Initial accident and coma ====
Around 2:00 AM on September 27, 2006, while riding a 50cc scooter alone in Taoyuan, Selikoff lost control and crashed into a median strip, suffering severe brain trauma. He was rushed to the hospital and underwent two major surgeries, during which a portion of his left skull was removed. Afterward, he fell into a deep coma with a GCS of 6. Doctors stated there was a 95% chance he would remain in a persistent vegetative state. Following the accident, his mother and sister traveled from Minnesota to Taiwan to be with him.

==== Brief awakening and long rehabilitation ====
More than a month after the accident, in early November 2006, Selikoff miraculously regained partial consciousness. He was able to open his eyes and showed slight reactions to his wife's visits. His condition improved enough for him to be moved from the intensive care unit to a general ward. However, the language area of his brain was damaged, and he developed complications such as pneumonia and gastritis from being bedridden, beginning a long road to recovery.

During more than six years of being bedridden, he underwent over 20 brain surgeries and was cared for primarily by his wife, Huang Ying-hui, and a caregiver. She once stated, "I always feel that to love someone is to have no regrets, willingly and gladly. Although it's hard, I am willing, because he is my husband, the man I deeply love, and the father of my children." Because Selikoff only had National Health Insurance and no life insurance, and had never applied for permanent residency, the substantial medical and care costs placed the family in financial hardship. Friends organized a fundraising event for him. Before the Lunar New Year in 2008, Selikoff developed a high fever due to sepsis, and the hospital issued a critical condition notice, but he once again miraculously pulled through.

== Death ==
On October 25, 2012, at 11:00 AM, Selikoff died at the age of 43. His wife, Huang Ying-hui, confirmed the news on her blog, expressing her grief that his passing was very sudden and that she and their children were not by his side. She wrote, "I know it's been 6 years, and a bedridden patient, declared a vegetable by doctors, would pass away one day, but it shouldn't have been... it really shouldn't have been when no one was with him." According to Huang, her husband's condition worsened at home while under the care of a caregiver. By the time she was rushing back, he had already passed away. He was rushed to St. Paul's Hospital in Taoyuan for final emergency treatment, where he was pronounced dead an hour later.

His funeral arrangements were kept simple, and the family followed his final wishes to arrange for their children to be brought back to the United States to live. Upon hearing the news of his death, host Tung Chih-cheng expressed his regret, saying, "He really liked Taiwan and always wanted to be an entertainer. It's a shame his dream was not fulfilled before the accident happened."

== Television appearances ==
Year	Network	Program Title	Notes
2005	AXN Asia	AXN Xtreme: India vs. Pakistan Challenge	Host of the Taiwan finals.
2004	CTi Variety	Kangsi Coming	Guest; episode theme "Foreigners in Taiwan".
2005–2006	GTV Variety Show	Celebrity Sports Day (大明星運動會)	Regular guest
2005–2006	CTi Variety	Everybody Talks Nonsense (全民大悶鍋)	Guest
2005–2006	TTV	The World is Different (世界大不同)	Regular guest
2005–2006	EBC Variety	What Are Men Up To? (男人搞什麼)	Guest
2005–2006	EBC Variety	Fortune Tellers (開運鑑定團)	Guest
2005–2006	EBC Variety	100 Battles, Big Victory (百戰大勝利)	Frequent guest
2005–2006	TTV	The Great Sage Equaling Heaven (齊天大勝)	Frequent guest on the "National English Test" segment
