= Wu Zongxian =

Wu Zongxian (吳宗憲) may refer to:

- Jacky Wu (born 1962), Taiwanese television show host, singer, and actor
- Wu Tsung-hsien (born 1971), Taiwanese politician elected to the 11th member of Legislative Yuan
