= Guess (TV program) =

- Logo
- Also known as: 你猜你猜你猜猜猜 (Ni Cāi Ni Cāi Ni Cāi Cāi Cāi)
- Genre: Variety
- Presented by: Jacky Wu; Patty Hou
- Country of origin: Taiwan
- Original language: Mandarin

Production
- Production locations: Taipei, Taiwan
- Running time: 60-120 minutes

Original release
- Network: China Television (CTV)
- Release: 2 November 1996 – 18 August 2012

Guess (Chinese: 你猜你猜你猜猜猜; pinyin: Ni Cāi Ni Cāi Ni Cāi Cāi Cāi; lit. 'You Guess You Guess You Guess Guess Guess') is a Taiwanese television variety show, hosted by Jacky Wu and other hosts, that began on 2 November 1996 and ended its run on 18 August 2012. It was broadcast in Taiwan, weekly on Saturdays from 22:00 to 00:00 on free-to-air China Television (CTV) (中視) and syndicated to be broadcast in Singapore weekly on Saturdays 23:30 on free-to-air MediaCorp Channel U and Malaysia's 8TV weekly on Sundays 17:00 to 18:30.

The show was twice nominated for Best Variety Programme and hosts Jacky Wu and Aya won Best Host in a Variety Programme from two nominations, at the Golden Bell Awards.

== History ==
Guess started on 4 July 1996 as 我猜我猜我猜猜猜 (pinyin: Wǒ Cāi Wǒ Cāi Wǒ Cāi Cāi Cāi; lit. 'I Guess I Guess I Guess Guess Guess'), but suffered low viewer ratings initially (apart from its pilot episode), until Jacky Wu took over the helm as the main male host on 21 March 1998. He has been the main host since, while his 2 female co-hosts have changed throughout the years. Former female hosts include Barbie Hsu (aka Da S), Dee Shu (aka Xiao S), Matilda Tao, Aya Liu (柳翰雅), Rainie Yang, S.H.E (Selina Ren, Hebe Tian and Ella Chen), Linda Jian (蝴蝶姐姐), and Yao Yao (郭書瑤).

Wu left the show on 3 July 2010, and hosting duties was taken up by Harlem Yu and Selina Jen. However, due to Selina's filming accident in October 2010, Chen Han-dian and Amber An filled in as co-hosts. Yu left the show on 28 January 2011 and the show went on a short hiatus. It relaunched with the new name on 12 March 2011, with Jacky Wu returning to the show as the main host and joined by Patty Hou as his new co-host. The show ended its 16-year run with more than 800 episodes on 18 August 2012.

While the show was still running in Taiwan, the production and writing staff were also working on the "talk" show Kangxi Lai Le, a variety show composed of star-studded topical and comedic interviews.

== Hosts ==
- 2 November 1996 - 14 March 1998: Lung Shao-hua, Barbie Hsu and Dee Hsu
- 21 March 1998 - October 2000: Jacky Wu, Barbie Hsu and Dee Hsu
- December 2000 - March 2001: Jacky Wu and Matilda Tao
- 17 April 2001 - 26 January 2002: Jacky Wu, Aya Liu (阿雅 aka 柳翰雅) and Dee Hsu
- 2 February 2002 - July 2002: Jacky Wu, Aya Liu and S.H.E
- September 2002 - May 2006: Jacky Wu, Aya Liu and Rainie Yang
- May 2006 - 27 January 2007: Jacky Wu, Rainie Yang and a substitute host
- 3 February - 14 July 2007: Jacky Wu, Hebe Tien and Selina Jen
- 21 July - 22 September 2007: Jacky Wu and two substitute hosts
- 29 September 2007 - 6 December 2008: Jacky Wu, Aya Liu and a substitute host
- 13 December 2008 - 9 January 2010: Jacky Wu, Aya Liu and Linda Jian (蝴蝶姐姐)
- 16 January 2010 - 10 April 2010: Jacky Wu, Aya Liu and Kuo Shu-yao
- 17 April - 3 July: 2010: Jacky Wu and two substitute hosts
- 24 July - 30 October 2010: Harlem Yu and Selina Jen
- 5 November 2010 – 28 January 2011: Harlem Yu, Chen Han Dian (陳漢典) and Amber An
- 12 March 2011 - 18 August 2012: Jacky Wu and Patty Hou - relaunched with new name

== Segments ==
Each show usually consists of 2 segments: "The truth cannot be faked" 真的假不了 and "Do not judge a book by its cover" 人不可貌相, but occasionally, especially during festivals, there will be specially organized segments.

In the first segment, "The truth cannot be faked", four people will be invited, each claiming to be able to accomplish something seemingly unbelievable. However, only three of them are telling the truth. Invited celebrities will then have to distinguish ("guess") the one who is lying; if they fail to guess correctly, they will be sprayed with cold mist (dry ice).

In the second segment, "Do not judge a book by its cover", there will be a mini-contest, with five people vying for a title, such as "Prettiest schoolgirl"; invited celebrities are again asked to guess which one of them will be the eventual winner. The winner is usually picked by a panel of experts.

Many Taiwanese celebrities have been first "discovered" by their participation in this show, such as the winners of the mini-contests held in the segment "Do not judge a book by its cover". Some budding Taiwanese artistes have also used this show as a launching pad for their hosting or singing careers. Lastly, invited Taiwanese celebrities used the show to promote their latest albums, books, shows, etc.

== Awards and nominations ==
Golden Bell Awards
Year	Number	Category	Nomination	Result	Ref
2008	43rd	Best Variety Programme	Guess	Nominated	
2008	43rd	Best Host in a Variety Programme	Jacky Wu, Aya	Won	
2009	44th	Best Variety Programme	Guess	Nominated	
2009	44th	Best Host in a Variety Programme	Jacky Wu, Aya	Nominated	
