= Didi's Dream =

- Theatrical release poster
- Directed by: Kevin Tsai
- Written by: Kevin Tsai; Liao Ming-yi
- Produced by: Liu Weijan; Liu Ju
- Starring: Dee Hsu; Lin Chi-ling; Jin Shijia; Li Zifeng
- Cinematography: Fisher Yu
- Edited by: Milk Su
- Music by: Chris Hou
- Distributed by: Atom Cinema; Kbro HK Limited; Le Vision Pictures
- Release date: 27 May 2017
- Running time: 91 minutes
- Countries: Taiwan; China
- Language: Mandarin
- Budget: NT$250 million (US$8.3 million, est.)
- Box office: US$4 million (international); NT$85.2 million (Taiwan)

Didi's Dream (Chinese: 吃吃的愛; also known as Didi's Dreams) is a 2017 Taiwanese-Chinese comedy film written and directed by Kevin Tsai. The film stars Dee Hsu, Lin Chi-ling, Jin Shijia and Li Zifeng.

== Premise ==
When Didi, an aspiring actress who lives in the shadow of her superstar older sister, meets Xu Chunmei, the heartbroken owner of a space station noodle shop, twists and turns in their crossed paths take them on a crazy adventure that fate has planned out for them.

== Cast ==
- Dee Hsu as Shangguan Didi / Xu Chunmei
- Jin Shijia as Kouzi
- David Chao as Television commercial director
- William Shen as Infomercial producer
- Vincent Liang as Producer
- Bruce Chen as Job interviewer
- Junior Han as Film director
- Gigi Lin as Job interviewer
- Vila Fan as Film producer
- Chen Han-dian as Wang Diandian
- Tender Huang as Fang
- Riva Chang as Tian Mei
- Michael Yang as Job interviewer
- Evonne Hsieh as Hsiao-hold
- Sky Li
- Luke Wu

=== Guest appearance ===
- Lin Chi-ling as Shangguan Lingling

=== Special appearance ===
- Li Zifeng as Astronaut #49

== Soundtrack ==
=== Featured songs ===
No.	Title	Writer(s)	Performer	Length
1.	"When I Was Young 小時候"	Wu Tsing-fong	Dee Hsu
2.	"Koi Fish Song 鯉魚歌"	Mavis Fan	Dee Hsu
3.	"Moon River (Mandarin version)"	Henry Mancini, Wu Tsing-fong	Wong Wei-xian
4.	"Clown 小丑"	Liu Chia-chang, Sun Yi	Dee Hsu
