= 100% Entertainment =

Taiwanese entertainment show

- Also known as: 娛樂百分百; Yú Lè Bǎi Fèn Bǎi
- Presented by: Wayne Huang; Kenny Khoo; Nine Chen; Shou Lou; Lai Yanju
- Country of origin: Taiwan
- Original languages: Mandarin; Taiwanese Hokkien
- No. of episodes: (list of episodes)

Production
- Executive producers: Zhu Zhi Jie (祝志傑) (1997-2012); Chen Meng Yue (陳盟岳) (2012-2015); Li Jin Ling (李金玲)(2015-present)
- Production locations: Taipei, Taiwan
- Running time: 60 minutes

Original release
- Network: GTV Variety Show
- Release: 5 May 1997 – present

100% Entertainment (Chinese: 娛樂百分百; pinyin: Yú Lè Bǎi Fèn Bǎi) is a Taiwanese entertainment news and variety show broadcast on GTV Variety Show. It is broadcast from Monday to Friday from 20:00 to 21:00 and repeats at 01:00, 06:00, 10:00 and 18:00 on the day after, with reviews on Saturdays. It is currently hosted by W0LF(S) members Wayne Huang, Kenny Khoo, Nine Chen, Shou Lou and Lai Yanju. There are live broadcasts every Tuesdays and Wednesdays from the recording studio, on entertainment news, sometimes with guests in attendance; the other days are pre-recorded variety specials and Sundays are repeats or other shows. There are no airings of the show on January 1.

== Host ==
Mondays to Fridays

- First batch – 5 May 1997: Joe Tsoi (Cai Rong Zu)
- Second batch – 13 October 1997：He Du Lin
- Third batch – 16 March 1998：Da S and Xiao S
  - 2000: Da S and Xiao S on leave for one month – Blackie Chen and Aya Liu filled in as replacements
- Fourth batch – August 2003：Da S, Xiao S and Blackie Chen (and Show Lo as locum)
- Fifth batch – 2005：Da S, Xiao S, Show Lo (and Alien Huang as locum)
  - September 2005: Xiao S on maternity leave
  - November 2005: Da S resigned
  - 17 November 2005: Alien Huang filled in as replacement whilst Xiao S on maternity leave
  - April 2006: Xiao S came back from maternity leave but resigned in August 2006
- Sixth batch – 17 September 2006: Show Lo, Alien Huang (and Linda Chien as locum)
- Seventh batch – Show Lo, Alien Huang and Linda Chien
  - February 2011: Linda Chien becomes an official host and no longer a replacement.
- Eighth batch – 12 November 2012: Show Lo, Alien Huang and Linda Chien, with William Liao @ Lollipop F and Owodog @ Lollipop F as locum during Show & Alien's extended leave for their respective concert tours.
  - February 2013: Owodog and William become the official host and no longer are replacements
- Ninth batch – 7 April 2015: Show Lo, Alien Huang and Linda Chien, with William Liao @ Lollipop F. (and Shanny Tu (better known as Arnold), Awayne @ Lollipop F and Mini Cai as locum)
  - Owodog did not extend his contract, and reverted to being a locum.
  - Alien takes indefinite leave of at least 2 years as a host on 6 December 2015 to concentrate as a singer and actor, will return as a guest.
- Tenth batch – Show Lo, Alien Huang and Linda Chien, with William Liao @ Lollipop F (with Wish Chu & Masha Pan @ GTM, Chris Chiu @ JPM and SpeXial as locum and correspondent)
- Eleventh batch – 10 April 2017 - Show Lo, Linda Chien, William Liao @ Lollipop F, Wish Chu & Masha Pan @ GTM, and Chris Chiu @ JPM (all promoted from locum)
  - William takes indefinite leave as a host on 19 December 2017 (with his send-off episode aired on December 30, 2017) to concentrate as an actor, will return as a guest, the fact he was not on the nominated list for Golden Bell Awards twice also attributing to the decision.
- Twelfth batch – 8 February 2018: Show Lo, Linda Chien, Chris Chiu, Wish Chu & Masha Pan @ GTM, Wayne Huang @ SpeXial (until September 2018 for military enlistment), Feng Tian (Win) @ SpeXial
  - Chris Chiu and Win were promoted from locum and outdoor correspondents.
  - Wish Chu and Masha Pan @ GTM left takes indefinite leave as host due to contract issues.
- Thirteenth batch – 27 December 2018: Show Lo, Linda Chien, Chris Chiu, Feng Tien
  - Feng Tien left his host position for other work.
- Fourteenth batch – 23 July 2019: Show Lo, Linda Chien, Chris Chiu
- Fifteenth batch – 13 August 2019: Show Lo, Linda Chien, Chris Chiu, Wayne Huang (Yvonne Liang, Sasa and Kenny Khoo as locum)
  - Kenny Khoo becomes an official host.
  - Chris Chiu left his position as host for personal development.
- Sixteenth batch – March 2020: Show Lo, Linda Chien, Wayne Huang, Kenny Khoo, Nine Chen
  - Show Lo and Linda Chien takes leave due to breakout of negative news on their relationship.
- Seventeenth batch - November 2020: Wayne Huang, Kenny Khoo, Nine Chen
  - The three hosts, along with fellow W0LF(S) members Shou Lou and Lai Yanju, host several segments dedicated for W0LF(S) together, while Shou and Lai both act as locum when the hosts are unavailable.
  - On the November 2020 edition of the monthly show introduction booklet from Gala Television, Show Lo and Linda Chien were removed from the list of hosts of the show, while Shou Lou and Lai were added to the list, but Shou and Lai were removed from the list again on the February 2021 edition.

Saturdays and Sundays

- First batch – November 2000：Blackie Chen and Aya Liu
- Second batch – 8 November 2000：Blackie Chen and Show Lo
- Third batch – 12 June 2002：Blackie Chen, Show Lo and Makiyo
- Fourth batch – end-2002: Xiao Xian (小嫻) and Hong Chih-te (洪其德)

There are no more weekend hosts after the fourth batch, the Saturdays shows are pre-recorded, Sunday shows is a re-run of a previously pre-recorded episode.

== Current Segments ==
- 100% Live (百分百 LIVE)
- Peanut Magic (花生省魔術, homophonic of "發生甚麼事", lit. What has happened)
- OWO Werewolf (凹嗚狼人殺)
  - Pro's Guide (高玩攻略)
  - Save Me, Master 09 (師父零九救我)
- OWO Wereword (凹嗚狼來了)
- School with Class 2-8 (二年八班開學了)
- WE~ Wayne with Singers (WE~晉愛唱)
- WE~ Wayne with Celebs (WE~晉大咖)
- I Have a Star at Home (我家也有大明星)
- OWO Contest (凹嗚大對抗)
- 28 Café (貳拾捌咖啡)
- Entertainers' Game (娛民遊戲)
- Board Game Research Club (桌遊研究社)
- Ding-dong W0LF(S) (叮咚五堅情)
- W0LF(S) Dorm (凹嗚五宿舍)
- W0LF(S) Chit-chat (五堅情的五四三)

== Awards and nominations ==
| Year | Award | Nomination | Result |
|---|---|---|---|
| 2015 | Best Host in a Variety Programme | Alien Huang, Show Lo | Nominated |
| 2016 | Best Variety Programme | 100% Entertainment | Nominated |
| 2017 | Best Variety Programme | 100% Entertainment | Nominated |
| | Best Host in a Variety Programme | Show Lo, Linda Chien | Won |

== Broadcast information ==
- Taiwan - GTV Variety Show: Everyday; 18:00 to 19:00 (repeats: 01:00, 06:00 and 10:00)

== See also ==
- List of 100% Entertainment episodes (2004 to 2007)
- List of 100% Entertainment episodes (2008)
