= My Beautiful Kingdom =

- Directed by: Mak Wing-lun
- Screenplay by: Xin Yuanzi
- Release date: December 13, 2013
- Running time: 87 minutes
- Country: China
- Language: Mandarin

My Beautiful Kingdom (Chinese: 我的美丽王国) is a 2013 Chinese romance-comedy film on RED by HBO directed by Mak Wing-lun and starring Jiro Wang, Chrissie Chau and Chen Han-dian.

== Cast ==
- Jiro Wang
- Chrissie Chau
- Chen Han-dian
