= 43rd Golden Bell Awards =

- Date: October 31, 2008
- Site: Sun Yat-sen Memorial Hall, Taipei, Taiwan
- Hosted by: Jacky Wu; Patty Hou; Tien Hsin
- Organized by: Bureau of Audiovisual and Music Industry Development

Television coverage
- Network: Azio TV

The 43rd Golden Bell Awards (Mandarin:第43屆金鐘獎) was held on October 31, 2008 at Sun Yat-sen Memorial Hall in Taipei, Taiwan. The ceremony was broadcast live by Azio TV.

== Winners and nominees ==
Below is the list of winners and nominees for the main categories.

Program/Award	Winner	Network
Television Broadcasting
Programme Awards
TV Series Award	Fated to Love You	SETTV; TTV
Mini-series/Movie award	PTV drama Life Exhibition: holiday	PTS
Traditional drama program award	Empress and Zhenfei	PTS
Educational and cultural program award	Moonlight ‧ under the sun	Hakka TV
Comprehensive program award	Seniors cooked years - Sun Yueh and his old friends	PTS
Entertainment Variety Show Award	Variety big winner	FTV
Singing variety show	Taiwan Spring Breeze	GTV
Individual Awards
TV Series Actor Award	雷洪 - "A Place Called Home"	FTV
TV Series Actress	Ariel Lin - "They Kiss Again	CTV
TV Series Supporting actor award	James Chan - "Big Love Theatre - Gold Line"	Big Love Satellite TV
TV Series supporting actress	Wang Juan - "generals Hsu Pang Hing"	Hakka TV
Mini-series/Movie actor	Wu Pong-fong - "PTV drama Life Exhibition: kapok mark"	PTS
Mini-series/Movie actress	Li Xuan - "PTV drama Life Exhibition: Crab"	PTS
Mini-series/Movie supporting actor award	Tang Chuan - "Mystery Train"	Hakka TV
Mini-series/Movie Supporting Actress	Wanfang - "PTV drama Life Exhibition: do not love Etude"	PTS
Best TV Series Director Award	Chen Wei-ling - "Big Love Theatre - Gold Line"	Big Love Satellite TV
Mini-series/Movie Director Award	Umin Boya - "Life Care Series - say good not cry"	GTV
Non-drama Director Award	麥覺明 - "MIT Make In Taiwan"	CTV
TV Series Screenplay Award	王小棣, Wen Yufang, Huangqiong Hui, Zhang Kexin, 曾莉婷, 柯雁心 - "Wayward Kenting"	PTS
Mini-series/movie Screenplay Award	Chen Wei-ling, YIN Xin - "PTV drama Life Exhibition: Talking With You Boyfriend's Ex-Girlfriend"	PTS
Comprehensive show host award	Jennifer Shen - "Shen Chunhua LIFE Show"	CTI
Entertainment variety show host award	Jacky Wu, Aya (Liu Han Ya) - "Guess (variety show)"	CTV
Singing variety show host award	Regine Lee - "Super Idol"	SETTV
Photography Awards	Pollock Jacob Harrison - "PTV drama Life Exhibition: do not love Etude"	PTS
Editing Award	Chen Weiling - "PTV drama Life Exhibition: Talking With You Boyfriend's Ex-Girlfriend"	PTS
Sound Award	Guo Lai Qi, Chen Qi - "PTV drama Life Exhibition: Hopscotch"	PTS
Lighting Award	Zhuangsheng Qin - "PTV drama Life Exhibition: orange sauce taste"	PTS
Art and Design Award	Lee Yu-Sheng, Xu Yu Ting, XU De Huan, Xu Deyu, Cai Junlang - "Liu Sanmei"	Hakka TV
Marketing Advertising Awards
Program Marketing Award	Fated to Love You	SETTV
Channel Advertising Awards	Hope Love Series	Big Love Satellite TV
Research and Development Award	Jiang Guoliang, Zhao Zhiyuan, Xing Shao - "wireless broadband (WiMAX) news coverage handheld platform cum interactive television system research and development"	CTV
