= Kangsi Coming =

Taiwanese variety-comedy talk show

- Also known as: Variety Show of Mr. Con and Ms. Csi (ATV)
- Genre: Talk show/Variety show
- Created by: Wang Wei-Chung (王偉忠)
- Presented by: Dee Hsu (2004–2016); Kevin Tsai (2004–2016); Chen Han-dian (sidekick) (2007–2016)
- Country of origin: Taiwan
- Original language: Mandarin
- No. of episodes: 2933

Production
- Executive producers: Liu Te-Hui (劉德蕙), Wu Cheng-Hua (Mao Mao) (吳承樺(毛毛)), Sun Le-Hsin (孫樂欣), B2 (陳彥銘), Li Kuo-Chiang (李國強)
- Producers: Wang Wei-chung (王偉忠), James Chan (詹仁雄)
- Production location: Taipei
- Running time: 60 minutes
- Production companies: Chungta Production (2004-2009); Golden Star Entertainment (2009-2016)

Original release
- Network: CTi Variety
- Release: 5 January 2004 – 14 January 2016

Kangsi Coming (Chinese: 康熙來了; pinyin: Kāngxī Lái Le; lit. 'Kangxi Arrives" or "Here Comes Kangxi') was a Taiwanese variety-comedy talk show hosted by Dee Hsu (a.k.a. Little S) and Kevin Tsai from 2004 to 2016, with the addition of sidekick Chen Han-dian since 2007. The show had been produced by Chungta Production (中大製作) from 2004 to 2009; after Chungta shut down, it was produced by Golden Star Entertainment (金星娛樂). The typical format of the show was for the hosting duo to interview a panel of celebrity guests on various topics while engaging in comedic banter. The show also conducted special interviews with important figures in politics and entertainment.

Although it was broadcast in Taiwan, Kangsi gained enormous popularity among the broader Chinese speaking audiences, and is considered one of the most successful talk shows in the Sinophone world.

== Name ==
The show had originally been named "Qi Guai Shi Dian Zhong" (奇怪十點鐘, "Weird 10 o'clock"), but was changed to Kangsi Coming soon after its debut. Kangsi, an alternative romanization of Kangxi Emperor of the Qing dynasty, was a pun derived from the names of the hosts; 康 (Kang) was taken from the Chinese name of Kevin Tsai and 熙 (Si) from the Chinese name of Dee Hsu.

== Style ==
Kangsi Coming gained popularity with the dynamic chemistry between its hosts. Tsai, who had been known for his background as a writer and host of serious, cerebral talk shows before Kangsi, provided a sharp contrast to Hsu's wacky and sassy hosting style. The show was also noted for its interest in celebrity gossip and its embrace of subcultures, including being one of the most high-profile platforms for LGBT culture in the Chinese-speaking world. With a fast-paced, tongue-in-cheek, and self-aware approach, the hosts frequently broke the fourth wall and veered away from conventional celebrity promotional interviews, opting instead for playful roasting or deep dives into guests’ private lives. The production incorporated cartoon sound effects, comical editing techniques such as instant replays, and animated text and visuals, enhancing the show's humor and energetic tone.

== Special Units ==
Apart from the typical interview format of the show, some special units were held irregularly:

- "Remove Makeup" - female celebrities removed makeup to show their plain faces.
- "Gift Swap" - celebrities and sometimes the hosts brought gifts following certain themes to exchange with one another.
- "Apology Conference" - the hosts "apologized" to the guests who were roasted most harshly on the show, typically held every year.
- Singing and dancing competitions judged by professionals and the hosts.

From 2008 to 2011, the show held Kangsi Concert (康熙盛典), an all-star concert tour across mainland China hosted by the duo.

== List of guests ==
Since its premiere in 2004, the show hosted guests from Taiwan and beyond. The following is only an incomplete list.

=== Taiwan ===
Entertainers

- Mayday
- Ashin
- S.H.E
- Selina Ren
- Hebe Tien
- Ella Chen
- David Tao
- Leehom Wang
- Jay Chou
- Cyndi Wang
- Jolin Tsai
- Jacky Wu
- Rainie Yang
- Ruby Lin
- Barbie Hsu
- Elva Hsiao
- Jerry Yan
- Vic Chou
- Show Lo
- Alien Huang
- Vanness Wu
- Ken Chu
- 5566
- Evonne Hsu
- Energy
- Fahrenheit
- Hey Girl
- Phil Chang
- A-mei Chang
- Harlem Yu
- Annie Shizuka Inoh
- Lollipop
- Blackie Chen
- Christine Fan
- 183 Club
- Mavis Fan
- Weber Yang
- 7 Flowers
- Richie Ren
- Joyce Zhao,
- Joe Chen
- Beatrice Hsu
- Ariel Lin
- Genie Chuo
- 2moro
- Demos Chiang
- Pace Wu
- Mike He
- Joe Cheng
- Vivian Hsu
- Mickey Huang
- Lene Lai
- Mark Chao
- Sodagreen
- Wu Qing-feng
- Ethan Juan
- Sweety
- Jocelyn Wang
- David Wu
- Deserts Chang
- Angela Chang
- Roger Yang
- Ricky Xiao
- Matilda Tao
- Patty Hou
- Jimmy Lin
- Stanley Huang
- Lin Chi-ling, Sonia Sui, Bianca Bai and other Models from Catwalk Modeling Agency
- Contestants from One Million Star Season 1, 2, 3, 4 & 5

Politicians

- Ma Ying-jeou - Former President of Republic of China (Taiwan)
- Wu Po-hsiung - Former Chairman of Kuomintang
- Jason Hu - Former Mayor of Taichung City
- Annette Lu - Former Vice President of the Republic of China (Taiwan)
- Lien Chan - Former Vice President of the Republic of China (Taiwan)
- Su Tseng-chang - Former Premier of the Republic of China (Taiwan)
- John Chiang - Former Foreign Minister of Republic of China (Taiwan)
- Chiu Yi - Former Member of the Legislative Yuan from Kaohsiung County
- Li Ao - Former Member of the Legislative Yuan from Taipei County

=== Hong Kong and Macau ===
Andy Lau, Eason Chan, Edison Chen, Carina Lau, Ng Man Tat, Eric Tsang, Nicholas Tse, Shawn Yue, Wong Jing, Cecilia Cheung, Stephen Chow, Twins (band), Joey Yung, Lydia Shum, Vivian Chow, Fiona Sit, Ronald Cheng, Josie Ho, Anita Yuen, Wakin Chau, Joyce Cheng, Anthony Wong, John Woo, Jacky Cheung, Jaycee Chan, Timmy Hung, Kelly Chen, Grasshopper (band), Dicky Cheung, Khalil Fong, Sammo Hung, G.E.M

=== Mainland China ===
Huang Lei, Huang Xiaoming, Tao Hong, Qin Hailu, Hai Qing, Huang Haibo, Zhao Wei, Yang Zishan, Huang Bo, Liu Liyang, Huang Yali, Jing Boran, Yu Kewei, Ding Ding, Zhang Hexuan, Zhang Wei, Li Jianjun, Anson Hu, Li Bingbing, Zhang Hanyu, Xiao Shenyang, Hu Xia, Ding Dang, Liu Yan, Huang Shengyi, The New Seven Little Fortunes, Ye Zixuan, Yang Qingqian, Jason Zhang, Xie Na, Lu Yao, Best Crew, Na Ying, Chen Kaige, Chen Hong, Chen Jianbin, Han Geng, Yan Yidan, Guo Jingming, Yu Quan, Zheng Kai, TFBoys, Wang Yibo, Li Wenhan, Zhou Yixuan, Wang Xiaofei, Fan Bingbing, Li Chen

=== Overseas ===
Seth Rogen, Michel Gondry (The Green Hornet), Wonder Girls, Stefanie Sun, Kris Phillips, Take That (Band), Coco Lee, Henry Lee, JJ Lin, Maria Ozawa, Atsushi Tamura, By2, Gary Chaw, Ah Niu, A-do, Michael & Victor, Penny Tai, Eric Moo, Jet Li, Bai Ling, Fish Leong

== Awards and nominations ==
Golden Bell Awards

- 43rd (2008)
  - Nominated: Best Host in a Variety Programme (Kevin Tsai, Dee Hsu)
- 42nd (2007)
  - Nominated: Best Variety Programme
  - Nominated: Best Host in a Variety Programme (Kevin Tsai, Dee Hsu)
- 41st (2006)
  - Nominated: Best Host in a Variety Programme (Kevin Tsai, Dee Hsu)
- 40th (2005)
  - Won: Best Host in a Variety Programme (Kevin Tsai, Dee Hsu)
  - Nominated: Best Variety Programme
