= Kevin Tsai =

Taiwanese television personality

- 蔡康永
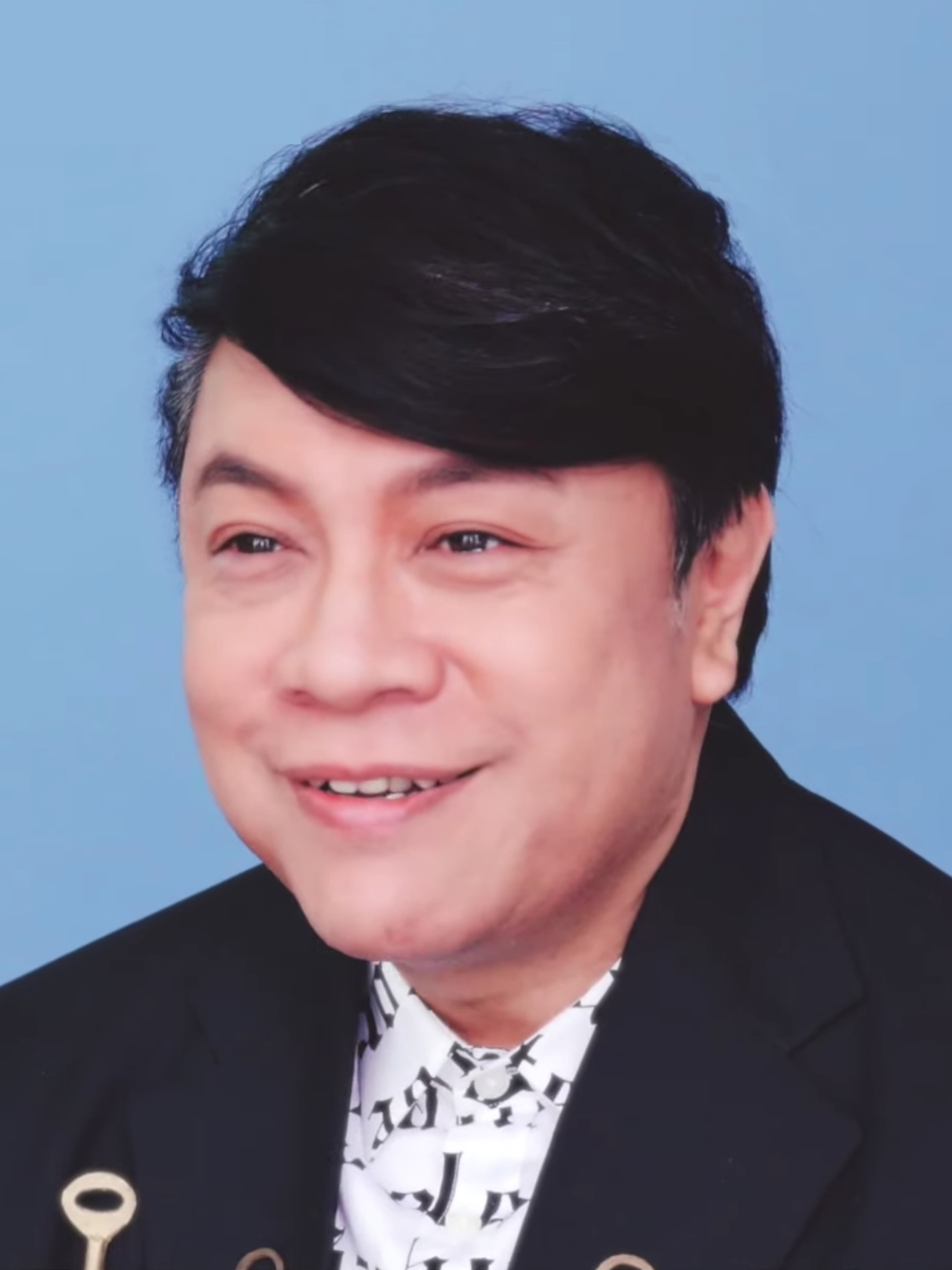
- Tsai in 2020
- Born: 1 March 1962 (age 64); Taipei, Taiwan
- Other name: Tsai Kang-yong
- Education: Tunghai University (BA); University of California, Los Angeles (MFA)
- Occupations: Television host; Writer
- Agent: HT Entertainment (2009-2023)
- Television: Kangsi Coming (2004-2016); I Can I BB (2014-2021)
- Partner: Liu Kunlong (1994–present)

Tsai Kang-yong (Chinese: 蔡康永; pinyin: Cài Kāngyǒng; born 1 March 1962), also known by his English name Kevin Tsai, is a Taiwanese television host and writer. He is known for co-hosting the Chung T'ien Television talk show Kangsi Coming (2004–2016) with Dee Hsu and for his self-help book series Ways of Speaking (2010; 2014).

== Early life and education ==
Tsai was born in 1962 in Taipei, Taiwan, to waishengren parents who had emigrated from Shanghai, China. His father, Tsai Tien-duo (蔡天鐸), was a lawyer who had graduated from Fudan University. Before Tsai's birth, his father had co-owned a shipping company, the Chonglian Steamship Company, whose passenger ship, the Taiping, sank in 1949, leaving the family bankrupt. His father was a book collector whose library exposed Tsai to literature, history, and the arts from an early age. Tsai also accompanied his father in collecting paintings, beginning to purchase artworks on his behalf at the age of eleven.

Tsai attended Taipei Private Tsai Hsing School, graduating from its elementary division in 1974, junior high school in 1977, and senior high school in 1980. He began learning Peking opera at the age of nine and performed in a school production of Silang Visits His Mother (四郎探母). During his school years, he served as a class monitor, edited the school magazine, and was involved in student council activities. While editing the school magazine, he encouraged other students to write about politically sensitive subjects, including the February 28 incident and communist political thought, during Taiwan's period of martial law. The articles resulted in two disciplinary demerits and nearly led to his expulsion, although he ultimately remained at the school until graduation.

After completing high school, Tsai enrolled at Tunghai University, where he initially studied social work. He graduated in 1984 with a bachelor's degree in foreign languages and literature. After graduation, he moved to the United States to study film and television production at the University of California, Los Angeles, having obtained a recommendation letter from film director King Hu. While studying in Los Angeles, Tsai was invited by Taiwanese novelist Pai Hsien-yung to adapt his short story The Exiled Immortal (謫仙記) into a screenplay. He subsequently worked on the film adaptation, The Last Aristocrats, one of his earliest screenwriting projects. Tsai earned his Master of Fine Arts degree in film and television production from the UCLA School of Theater, Film and Television in 1990.

== Career ==
Tsai started his career as a columnist and film critic for the China Times. He wrote several film scripts, including Ming Ghost (1990) and Fong Sai-Yuk (1993). He has since become a best-selling author, known for his self-help book Ways of Speaking (2010), followed by a sequel in 2014.

In 1996, Tsai had his career breakthrough as he became the creative director of Voice of Taipei radio station, the first editor-in-chief of GQ Taiwan and the host of his first TV show, Fanshu Chudian Wang, all in the same year. Tsai continued to host a series of critically acclaimed TV shows such as Zhenqing Zhishu and Two Generation Company. Since 2004, Tsai and Dee Hsu co-hosted the talk show Kangsi Coming, which gained enormous popularity across the Chinese-speaking world. Additionally, Tsai was a frequent MC of award shows, including twice at the Golden Bell Awards and seven times at the Golden Horse Awards. In 2009, Tsai co-founded the management company HT Entertainment.

Since the 2010s, Tsai has been active in mainland China, where he found success in co-hosting the popular iQIYI debate show I Can I BB (2014 –2021) and often collaborated with his I Can I BB co-host Ma Dong and Ma's production company Mewe Media. After Kangsi wrapped in 2016, Tsai wrote and directed his first feature film, Didi's Dream (2017), starring Hsu. The film received mixed reviews and performed poorly at the box office. Tsai reunited with Hsu in 2018 for the Youku variety show Zhenxiang ba! Huahua Wanwu for three seasons, but they failed to replicate the popularity of Kangsi Coming.

In July 2023, HT Entertainment, the management company co-founded by Tsai, was disbanded. In 2024, on the 20th anniversary of Kangsi Coming, Tsai and Hsu considered reviving the show for three special episodes. However, the producer, James Chan, negotiated with the TV station to create a full season, which exceeded the hosting duo's original plan and ultimately fell through.

== Personal life ==
In 2002, during an episode of Sisy's Show guest-hosted by Li Ao for Sisy Chen, Tsai came out after being asked by Li if he was gay, making him one of the first openly gay celebrities in the Chinese-speaking world. Tsai has been in a relationship with George Liu Kunlong, an English professor, since 1994.

== Political activity ==
On 4 October 2026, Tsai attended the opening of the campaign headquarters of Puma Shen, the Democratic Progressive Party's nominee for mayor of Taipei in the 2026 Taiwanese local elections. Tsai said he had come to prepare for interviews with the candidates and wanted to hear views from all sides, without explicitly endorsing Shen. As Shen has been sanctioned by Beijing as a "diehard Taiwan independence separatist," several brands distanced themselves from Tsai and some of the programmes featuring him were taken off the streaming services in China. Taiwan's Mainland Affairs Council criticised Chinese pressure on Tsai, while Shen and Chiang Wan-an defended his attendance as a democratic norm.

On 25 October 2026, Tsai posted a statement on Weibo, saying, "I have always hoped for friendly exchanges across the Taiwan Strait. I have never supported Taiwan independence." while adding, "If you have ever appreciated my work, I may not have the chance to thank you in person again." Tsai described the Weibo post as a “farewell, thank-you, and apology” to his partners and fans in mainland China. On 26 October, he attended the opening of Chiang Wan-an's campaign headquarters. On October 29, Tsai said in an interview that the October 3 police raid on a gay bar in Taipei, for which the municipal administration under Chiang later apologized, prompted his decision to attend Shen's campaign rally.

== Bibliography ==
Tsai has written seven books, including:

- Chinese: 流浪記
- Chinese: 痛快日記, published 1996
- Chinese: 再錯也要談戀愛, published 1996
- Those brilliant things the guys gave to me (Chinese: 那些男孩教我的事), published 2004

== Filmography ==
=== Film ===
Year	English title	Chinese title	Role	Notes
1989	The Last Aristocrats	最后的贵族	Early adapter from the original novel	Uncredited
1990	Ming Ghost	阿婴	Screenwriter	
1990	Song of the Exile	客途秋恨	Associate Producer	
1993	Fong Sai-yuk	方世玉	Co-screenwriter	
2017	Didi's Dream	吃吃的愛	Director, co-screenwriter	

=== Hosting ===
==== Awards ceremony ====
Year	Event	Notes
2001	38th Golden Horse Awards	Co-host (with Carol Cheng)
2002	39th Golden Horse Awards	Co-host (with Carol Cheng)
2003	40th Golden Horse Awards	Co-host (with Carol Cheng)
2004	40th Golden Bell Awards	Co-host (with Dee Hsu)
2004	41st Golden Horse Awards	Co-host (with Chiling Lin)
2005	China Fashion Awards	Host
2006	43rd Golden Horse Awards	Co-host (with Patty Hou)
2007	42nd Golden Bell Awards	Co-host (with Patty Hou)
2010	47th Golden Horse Awards	Co-host (with Dee Hsu)
2013	50th Golden Horse Awards	Host

==== Variety show ====
Year	Title	Role
1994-1995	流行都市	Host
1996-1997	翻书触电王	Host
1998-2003	真情指数	Host
2002-2005	今天不读书	Host
2003-2005	Two Generation Company 两代电力公司	Host
2004-2015	Kangsi Coming 康熙来了	Co-host (with Dee Hsu)
2005	View 360 观点360	Host
2005-2006	志永智勇电力学校	Co-host (with Chiling Lin)
2006-2007	Happy Saturday 幸福星期六	Host
2014-2020	I Can I BB 奇葩说	Mentor
2015	The Million Second Quiz 百万秒问答	Host
2017	Desserts Club 男子甜点俱乐部	Host
2017	The Temptation of the Meal S2 饭局的诱惑（第二季）	Host
2018-2020	真相吧！花花万物	Co-host (with Dee Hsu)
2023	The Echo of Life 众声	Host

=== Music video appearances ===
Year	Title	Singer	Notes
2011	"陷阱 Trap"	Cindy Yen	
2012	"你存在 Existence"	Shin	

== Awards and nominations ==
=== Golden Bell Awards ===
Year	Nominee / work	Award	Result
2003	Zhen Qing Zhi Shu	Best Host in a Culture & Education Programme	Nominated
2003	Two Generation Company	Best Host in a Variety Programme	Nominated
2004	Two Generation Company	Best Host in a Variety Programme	Nominated
2005	Two Generation Company	Best Host in a Variety Programme	Nominated
2005	Kangsi Coming (康熙来了)	Best Host in a Variety Programme	Won
2006	Kangsi Coming (康熙来了)	Best Host in a Variety Programme	Nominated
2007	Kangsi Coming (康熙来了)	Best Host in a Variety Programme	Nominated
2008	Kangsi Coming (康熙来了)	Best Host in a Variety Programme	Nominated
