= 50th Golden Bell Awards =

- Date: September 26, 2015
- Site: Sun Yat-sen Memorial Hall, Taipei, Taiwan
- Organized by: Bureau of Audiovisual and Music Industry Development

Television coverage
- Network: CTV

The 50th Golden Bell Awards (Mandarin:第50屆金鐘獎) was held on September 26, 2015 at Sun Yat-sen Memorial Hall in Taipei, Taiwan. The ceremony was broadcast live by CTV.

== Winners and nominees ==
Below is the list of winners and nominees for the main categories.

| Best Television Series: The Way We Were | Best Miniseries or Television Film: Wake Up |
| Best Variety Show: Global Chinese Music (全球中文音樂榜上榜) | Best Comprehensive Show: A Wonderful Word (一字千金) |
| Best Leading Actor in a Television Series: Lan Cheng-lung — Apple in Your Eye | Best Leading Actress in a Television Series: Zhu Zhi-ying — Brave Forward (客家劇場—新丁花開) |
| Best Supporting Actor in a Television Series: Soda Voyu — Crime Scene Investigation Center (C.S.I.C鑑識英雄) | Best Supporting Actress in a Television Series: Hsu Wei-ning — The Way We Were |
| Best Leading Actor in a Miniseries or Television Film: Kaiser Chuang — The Road Home (公視人生劇展—回家路上) | Best Leading Actress in a Miniseries or Television Film: Yen Yi-wen — Angel's Radio (公視人生劇展—天使的收音機) |
| Best Supporting Actor in a Miniseries or Television Film: Wu Kang-jen — Wake Up | Best Supporting Actress in a Miniseries or Television Film: Thu Trinh Trần — Let the Sunshine In (公視人生劇展—浪子單飛) |
| Best Host for a Variety Show: Mickey Huang — Global Chinese Music (全球中文音樂榜上榜) | Best Host for a Comprehensive Show: Soac Liu and Joël Chen — Kitchen Cook-Off Season 2 (雙廚出任務第2季) |
| Lifetime Achievement Award: Chou Yo; Chang Feng | |
