= Aya Liu =

Taiwanese television host, singer and actress

- 柳翰雅
- Born: 14 September 1978 (age 47); Taipei, Taiwan
- Education: Taipei Hwa Kang Arts School
- Occupations: Television host, singer, actress
- Years active: 1996 - present
- Notable work: Princess Huaiyu
- Television: Guess Guess Guess
- Spouse: Dzogchen Ponlop Rinpoche (m. 2014)
- Children: 1
- Awards: Best Host in a Variety Programme; 2008 Guess Guess Guess

Aya Liu (Chinese: 柳翰雅; pinyin: Liǔ Hànyǎ; born 14 September 1978) is a Taiwanese television host, singer and actress. Liu won the Best Host in a Variety Programme Award at the Golden Bell Awards in 2008 for co-hosting Guess.

== Early life ==
Liu was born in Taipei, Taiwan on September 14, 1978, with her ancestral home in Pizhou, Jiangsu. She enrolled at the Taipei Hwa Kang Arts School, where she was classmates with Barbie Hsu, Dee Hsu and Pace Wu. In mid-2006, Liu suspended her career in Taiwan and traveled to the United States for study. She spent two weeks in New York before moving to California, where she enrolled at Cabrillo College. She returned to Taiwan in September 2007.

== Career ==
Liu hosted the variety show Guess Guess Guess with Jacky Wu in China Television, which earned her a Best Host in a Variety Programme Award at the Golden Bell Awards.

In 2011, Liu appeared in The Allure of Tears, a romance film starring Gigi Leung, Richie Jen, Joe Chen, Shawn Dou and Zhou Dongyu.

In 2012, Liu starred in the film Happiness Me Too, alongside Joe Chen and Sha Yi. She received positive reviews. That same year, she also starred in the romantic comedy film Pink lady.

== Personal life ==
Liu dated Tony, a Chinese-American businessman, in 2006, when she studied in America.

Her husband is Dzogchen Ponlop Rinpoche. In 2014, Liu gave birth to her daughter Eva in the United States.

== Filmography ==
=== Television ===
Year	English title	Chinese title	Role	Notes
1995	We are all Human	我們一家都是人		Anthology
2001	Princess Huaiyu	懷玉公主	Princess Aya	
2001	The Youth Friends	青春六人行	Aya	
2002	Poor Prince	貧窮貴公子	Chishang Longzi	
2003	Beauty Clinic II	好美麗診所		
2003	The Pawnshop No. 8	第8號當鋪	Wen Xin	
2004	Taipei Family	住左邊住右邊	Social worker	Cameo
2008	Small Wonder	电脑娃娃	Xu Mengmeng	
2008	Jianghu.com	江湖.com	Princess	Anthology
2010	4 Daughters	家有四千金	Wu Chuntian	

=== Film ===
Year	English title	Chinese title	Role	Notes
1999	Cop	神探兩個半	Aya	
1999	Taishan Mountain	《泰山》	Tuotuo	
2004	A Marvellous Detective	《妙探神威》	Kenan's sister	
2005	Fire Ball: Journey to the West - The Secret Behind the Fiery Mountains	《红孩儿大话火焰山》	Red Boy	voice
2007	Crossed Lines	命运呼叫转移		
2011	The Allure of Tears	《倾城之泪》	guest	
2012	Happiness Me Too	《幸福迷途》	Hu Fang	
2012	Pink lady	男生女生騙	Marriage freak	
2013		《痒婚之十年再爱你》		
2014		《宝岛青春日记》		
