= Mickey Huang =

Taiwanese comedian, television host, Master of Ceremonies and actor (born 1972)

- 黃子佼
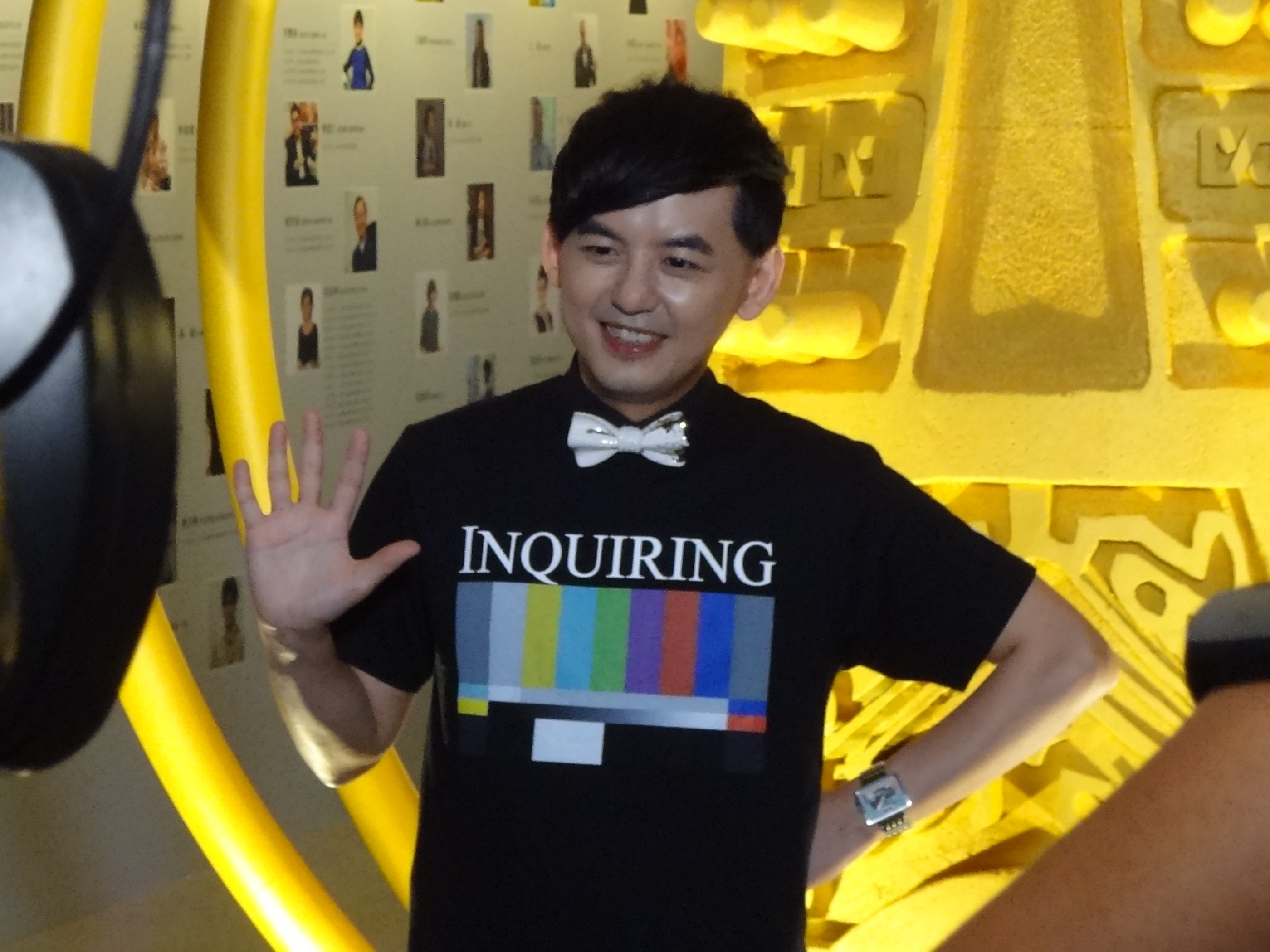
- Huang in 2015 Golden Bell Awards
- Born: 30 March 1972 (age 54); Taipei, Taiwan
- Other name: Huang Zijiao
- Occupations: Host, radio DJ, actor, entrepreneur, writer, Master of Ceremonies
- Years active: 1988–2023
- Spouse: Summer Meng (m. 2020; div. 2025)
- Children: 1

Mickey Huang Tzu-chiao (Chinese: 黃子佼; born 30 March 1972), also known as Jiao Jiao, is a Taiwanese host, comedian and convicted sex offender. He is best known for co-hosting the long-running show Super Sunday (超級星期天) in the late 1990s and early 2000s with Chang Hsiao-yen, Harlem Yu and Pu Hsueh-liang. He became master of ceremonies for Golden Bell Awards in 2006 and 2017, Golden Melody Awards in 2012, 2015–2017, Golden Horse Awards in 2015–2016 and Golden Note Composition Awards every year since its inception in 2010. He also MC'd the KKBOX Digital Music Awards from 2010 to 2017, except in 2012.

In 2023, during investigations into sexual harassment allegations, Huang was found in possession of child pornography. Authorities discovered 2,341 illicit files involving 37 minors. In 2026, the Supreme Court of Taiwan upheld an 18-month prison sentence, suspended for four years, contingent upon a TWD 1.2 million fine and community service.

== Personal life ==
From 1996 to 2000, Huang dated Dee Hsu. Their high-profile breakup derailed Huang's career due to the Hsu sisters' allegation of his affair with Bowie Tsang, which was validated months later by the founding issue of Next Magazine (Taiwan). Huang and Tsang split in 2003. In 2010, at the 47th Golden Horse Awards ceremony, upon the suggestion of Hsu's friend Kevin Tsai and Tsang's father Eric, Hsu and Tsang reconciled on stage with an embrace. Huang and Hsu reconciled on the latter's TV show Kangsi Coming in January 2015. Huang, Hsu and Tsang made the final reconciliation by all sharing the stage at the 50th Golden Bell Awards ceremony in September 2015.

On March 5, 2020, Huang married actress Summer Meng after six years of dating. The couple divorced in 2025 following Huang’s sex scandal.

=== Sexual Harassment accusations and possession of child porn ===
In June 2023, multiple women accused Huang of sexual harassment. He apologized for his actions but also made various allegations about Taiwan’s entertainment industry, accusing figures such as Barbie Hsu, Dee Hsu, DJ Koo, Lawrence Chou, Aya Liu and Mavis Fan of drug use, Jacky Wu of infidelity, and Ariel Sha of falsely denying her relationship with Huang, among other claims. After the kamikaze revelations, he mutilated himself and was sent to the hospital. The Hsu sisters, Liu and Fan denied the allegations of drug use. Prosecutors did not prosecute Huang for sexual harassment for the lack of evidence, however, during the search for his sexual harassment accusations in August 2023, police found child pornography on his computer. He was then ordered to pay a fine of TWD 1.2 million and prosecuted for possessing child pornography.
