= Everybody Speaks Nonsenses II – Hot Pot =

Taiwanese television series

Everybody Speaks Nonsenses II – Hot Pot (Chinese: 全民亂講之全民大悶鍋) was a popular Taiwanese television sketch show, mainly focusing on topics related to Taiwanese politics.

This show developed from Everybody Speaks Nonsenses. Its components parody several television broadcasts around the world, including a stock index analyst (as a political popularity index), Nazism (I "Love" Taiwan), and even the Taiwan Affairs Office of the State Council of the People's Republic of China. First broadcast in 2004 on cable television Chung T'ien Television (CtiTV), it has since gained prominence among Taiwanese viewers, and in January 2006 earned a mention by CNN's World Report on Taiwan-China relations. The show was succeeded by People's Party (全民最大黨).

In 2007 the show was nominated for Best Entertainment Variety Programme at the 42nd Golden Bell Awards.
