= 51st Golden Bell Awards =

- Date: October 8, 2016
- Site: Sun Yat-sen Memorial Hall, Taipei, Taiwan
- Hosted by: Jacky Wu; Plungon
- Organized by: Bureau of Audiovisual and Music Industry Development

Television coverage
- Network: Sanlih E-Television

The 51st Golden Bell Awards (Mandarin:第51屆金鐘獎) was held on October 8, 2016, at Sun Yat-sen Memorial Hall in Taipei, Taiwan. The ceremony was broadcast live by Sanlih E-Television. Jacky Wu and comedian group Plungon hosted the ceremony.

== Winners and nominees ==
Below is the list of winners and nominees for the main categories.

Best Television Series: A Touch of Green	Best Miniseries or Television Film: The Island That All Flow By
Best Variety Show: Top Million Star	Best Comprehensive Show: Dapin (跟著dapin去旅行)
Best Leading Actor in a Television Series: Wu Kang-jen — A Touch of Green	Best Leading Actress in a Television Series: Ko Chia-yen — Marry Me, or Not?
Best Supporting Actor in a Television Series: He Yi-hang — Baby Daddy (長不大的爸爸)	Best Supporting Actress in a Television Series: Linda Liu — The Day I Lost You (失去你的那一天)
Best Newcomer in a Television Series: Cindy Lien — A Touch of Green	
Best Leading Actor in a Miniseries or Television Film: Mark Lee — Lost Daughter (公視人生劇展-再見女兒)	Best Leading Actress in a Miniseries or Television Film: Ivy Yin — The Island That All Flow By
Best Supporting Actor in a Miniseries or Television Film: Lan Wei-hua — The Black Box (客家電視電影院－黑盒子)	Best Supporting Actress in a Miniseries or Television Film: Wang Chuan — Lost Daughter (公視人生劇展-再見女兒)
Best Newcomer in a Miniseries or Television Film: Andrew Chen — The Island That All Flow By	
Best Host for a Variety Show: Jacky Wu and Sandy Wu — Super Followers (小明星大跟班)	Best Host for a Comprehensive Show: Sharon Huang — Hak Idea (客家熱點子)
Honorary Awards: Lifetime Achievement Award: Pang Yi-an; Mei Fang	
