= Matilda Tao =

Taiwanese singer and television personality

- 陶晶瑩
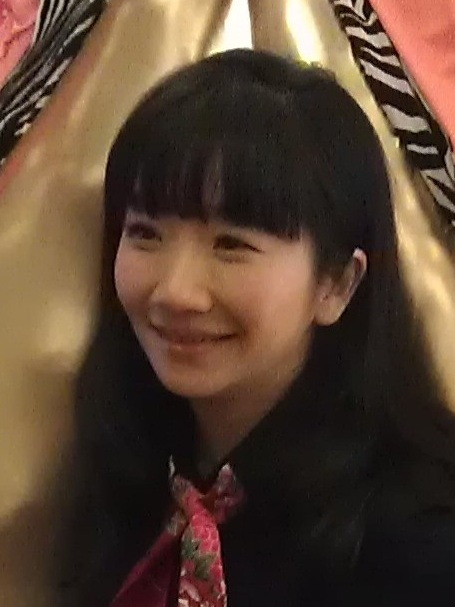
- Tao in 2012
- Other names: Tao Jingying; Taozi
- Education: National Chengchi University
- Occupations: Singer; television host; author
- Years active: 1990–present
- Spouse: Lee Lee-zen (m. 2005)
- Children: 2

Matilda Tao Ching-ying (Chinese: 陶晶瑩; pinyin: Táo Jīngyíng) is a Taiwanese singer, television host and author.

== Personal life ==
Tao graduated from National Chengchi University. In 2005, she married Taiwanese actor Lee Lee-zen and have two children together.

== Filmography ==
=== Hosting ===
==== Variety show ====
Year	Title
2007–present	One Million Star
2007–present	University
2000-2001	Guess
1999-2004	Love Lecture
1999-2001	TV Citizen
1996-2004	Entertainment News
1992-1994	Twin Bang

==== Award ceremonies ====
Year	Title
1999	Golden Horse Awards
2000	Golden Horse Awards
2004	Golden Melody Awards
2005	Golden Melody Awards
2006	Golden Melody Awards
2008	Golden Melody Awards
2008	Golden Horse Awards
2010	Hundred Flowers Awards
2013	Golden Melody Awards

== Awards and nominations ==
=== Golden Bell Awards ===
Year	Nominee / work	Award	Result
1999	Love Lecture	Best Host in a Television Programme	Won
2001	Entertainment News	Best Host in a Variety Programme	Won
2007	One Million Star	Best Host in a Variety Programme	Won
2008	One Million Star	Best Host in a Variety Programme	Nominated
2009	One Million Star	Best Host in a Variety Programme	Nominated
2010	One Million Star	Best Host in a Variety Programme	Nominated
