= Patty Hou =

Taiwanese news anchor

- 侯佩岑
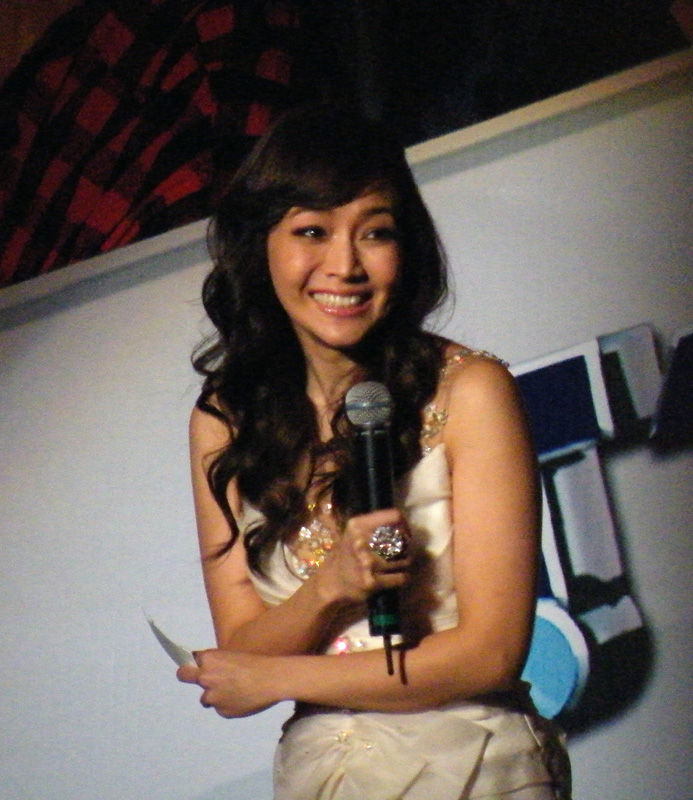
- Hou at the 2011 Taipei New Year's Eve Party
- Born: 20 December 1978 (age 47); Taipei, Taiwan
- Education: University of Southern California (BA)
- Occupations: Journalist; news anchor
- Years active: 2001–present
- Agent(s): Fu Long Production Co., Ltd.
- Spouse: Ken Huang (m. 2011)
- Children: Ian Huang (son); Ethan Huang (son)
- Parent(s): Hou Shih-hung (father); Lin Yueyun (mother)

Chinese name
- Chinese: 侯佩岑
Transcriptions
Standard Mandarin
- Hanyu Pinyin: Hóu Pèicén

Patty Hou (Chinese: 侯佩岑; pinyin: Hóu Pèicén; born 20 December 1977) is a Taiwanese TV host.

== Career ==
Hou was born in Taipei, Taiwan. She earned a degree in mass communications and psychology from the University of Southern California. She was a news anchor for TTV, Era News and CTi before transitioning to talk shows and variety programming. From 2004 to 2012, she hosted the Azio TV show Entertainment in Asia. In 2025, she participated in the Chinese reality show Ride the Wind 2025.

== Controversy ==
In 2024, Hou joined a group of Taiwanese celebrities in their endorsement of Chinese unification on social media. In 2025, after her second endorsement, Taiwan's Mainland Affairs Council condemned “a small number of Taiwanese entertainers” for echoing the CCP’s official narrative in pursuit of personal career interests in mainland China.

== Works ==
=== Experience ===
- 2001: Trainee reporter at Taiwan Television (TTV).
- 2002: English news anchor at CTi TV.
- 2003: the anchor of Era News
- 2004–2005: the anchor of ERA News and ERA Fashion News, AZIO TV's Entertainment-News@Asia anchor, and the Editor of Patty's about magazine book.
- 2005: Host with Matilda Tao and ChiLing, Lin for the 16th Golden Melody Award at Kaohsiung, Taiwan.
- 2005: Host with Guo Liang for the 2005 Star Awards in Singapore.
- 2006: Host with Guo Liang for the 2006 Star Awards in Singapore.
- She participated in the dubbing of Taiwanese Mandarin version of the film Flushed Away, as the character of Rita.
- 2007: Host with Matilda Tao for the 18th Golden Melody Award at Taipei Arena, Taiwan.
- 2011: Host with Jacky Wu for the 22nd Golden Melody Award at Taipei Arena, Taiwan.

== TV series ==
- 2007: Sweet Relationship 美味關係 as Chung Bai Hui
- 2010: Love Buffet 愛似百匯 Ai Si Bai Hui as 穎芝 Ying Zhi (特別演出/ Special Performance)
- 2011-2012: Guess 你猜你猜你猜猜猜 Guess Guess Guess with Jacky Wu
