= Jacky Wu =

Taiwanese television show host, singer, and actor

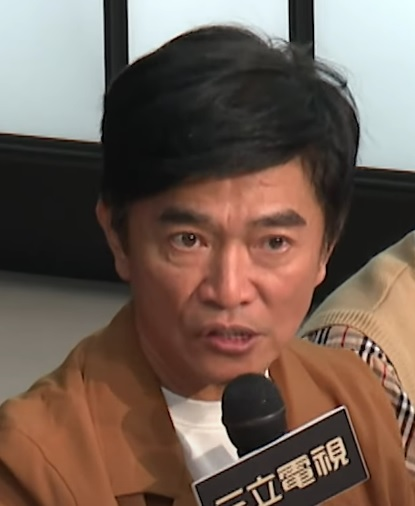
- Wu in October 2022
- Born: Wu Tsung-hsien
- Other names: Wu Zongxian; Xian Ge (憲哥 (Pe̍h-ōe-jī: Hiàn-ko))
- Education: National Taiwan University of Arts (BFA)
- Occupations: Television presenter; singer; actor; record producer; television director
- Years active: 1987–present
- Spouse: Chang Wei-wei (m. 1990)
- Children: 4, including Sandy Wu and Ricky Wu
- Musical career
- Genres: Mandopop; Hokkien pop
- Instrument: Vocals
- Labels: Kolin; Pony Canyon; Sony BMG

Chinese name
- Traditional Chinese: 吳宗憲
- Simplified Chinese: 吴宗宪
- Hanyu Pinyin: Wú Zōngxiàn
- Hokkien POJ: Ngô͘ Chong-hiàn

Jacky Wu (Chinese: 吳宗憲; Pe̍h-ōe-jī: Ngô͘ Chong-hiàn) is a Taiwanese television show host, singer, and actor. He hosts numerous variety shows, such as the long running popular Taiwanese variety show Guess.

== Career ==
In 1987, Wu started out by taking cameo roles in variety shows. He is known for his quick witted humor and open-fire talks, which have attracted both followers and critics.

In 1998, Wu provided the voice of the dragon Mushu in the Mandarin Chinese dub of the Disney animated film Mulan.

Maureen Tcakik of Time Asia described him as the sole Taiwanese entertainer to become a "phenomenon" and "the most popular guy on local television." In 2000, Channel V gave him the award "Favorite Chinese Person of the Year". In 2001, he had six variety talk shows in Taiwan.

Jacky Wu is a Taiwanese entertainer and television host. He is known for his quick-witted humor and outspoken style. Wu has hosted numerous variety programs and has remained active in Taiwan’s entertainment industry for many years. His personal life has received media coverage. He has stated that he may consider reducing his workload in the future in order to spend more time with his family.

Jacky Wu discovered Jay Chou's music score at a singing competition and was impressed with its complexity. Wu hired him as a contract composer and paired him with the novice lyricist Vincent Fang. Jay Chou then rose up to become a superstar celebrity in the Chinese arena.

He currently ranks as one of the richest entertainers in Taiwan. He had received honorary (non-academic) bachelor's degree from his alma mater – National Taiwan University of Arts for services in the Taiwanese entertainment industry because he never completed his studies in Performance Arts.

Wu has been the host of a number of popular shows, including the long-running "Guess" which won him an honor in 2008's Golden Bell Awards.

Wu has mentioned in an interview with Chinese website Sina.com.cn that the deadline for his retirement is 30 June 2010. He had hinted at his intention to retire many times, after which he will cease working as an entertainer. "I want to lead an easier life," Wu told Sina. "I've been in the show business for so long, I just need a change now," said Wu, whose 27-year-long career has included his stint as a host, singer and actor. The star says he will focus on his new company which makes environmentally friendly LED lamps.

Wu later returned to television hosting along with several new shows including Guess with co-host Patty Hou since 12 March 2011. He also continued hosting other variety shows such as Power Sunday until 2012.

Wu has won the Golden Bell Award a total of 4 times throughout his career. He won his first Golden Bell Award in 2008 with Aya Liu for variety show Guess. He continued with a three year streak from 2016 to 2018 for Best Host in a Reality or Game Show. In 2016, he won the Best Host in a Variety Show with his eldest daughter Sandy for Super Followers, and in 2017 and 2018, he won with Kid (Lin Bo-sheng) for Mr. Player for Best Host in a Reality or Game Show.

== Personal life ==
Wu's father is Cantonese and mother Taiwanese. He secretly married Chang Wei-wei in a "simple ceremony" attended by their parents in 1990 and has three daughters, Sandy, Vivian and Olivia, and one son, Ricky. He admitted to lying about his marital status and apologized publicly in a newspaper interview on 16 August 2000. Wu claimed that he did not conceal his marital status to protect his career in the show business, but instead to protect his children from possible harm due to media exposure. Wu and Chang had since registered their marriage in 2001.
