= August Pictures =

TV production company in Singapore

- Industry: Media Production
- Founded: June 2007
- Founder: Chow Wai Thong
- Headquarters: Singapore
- Services: Production; post-production
- Website: https://www.augustpictures.com.sg/

August Pictures (Chinese: 堂堂映画; pinyin: táng táng yìng huà) is an independent television production company based in Singapore since 2007. It has produced award-winning programmes, from documentaries like Workman Diaries (2018), A Medical Journey (2019) and Cooking For a Cause (2021), to dramas such as Beijing to Moscow (2019), The Driver (2019), Mind's Eye (2020), Teenage Textbook: The Series (2021) and Crouching Tiger Hidden Ghost (2021).

== Television works ==
=== Docuseries ===
Year	English / Chinese Title	Episodes	Network
2018	Workman Diaries 我的打拼日记	18	meWATCH
2019	A Medical Journey 寻医	10	Channel U
2021	Cooking For a Cause 特别的食物给特别的你	8	Channel U
2022	Inside Crime Scene 狮城奇案：罪案现场	5	Channel 8
2022	Being Together 当我们不在一起	6	Channel U
2022	Gems of The Lands 镇乡之宝	13	Channel U

=== Television series ===
Year	English / Chinese Title	Genre	Episodes	Network
2019	Beijing To Moscow 北京到莫斯科	Romance	13	Channel U
2019	The Driver 伺机	Action	11	Channel 8 meWATCH
2020	Mind's Eye 心眼	Thriller	13	meWATCH
2021	Teenage Textbook: The Series	Teen	13	Channel 5
2021	Crouching Tiger Hidden Ghost 卧虎藏鬼	Comedy	20	Channel 8
2024	Kill Sera Sera 谁杀了她	Crime, mystery	12	Channel 8

=== Infotainment ===
Year	English / Chinese Title	Episodes	Network
2021	The Food We Love To Hate 畏口大开	10	Channel U
2022	Zero Waste Kitchen	6	Channel 5
2022	Invisible Design 看不见的设计	6	Channel U

== Awards and nominations ==
=== Asian Academy Creative Awards ===
Year	Programme	Category	Result
2019	Beijing To Moscow 北京到莫斯科	Best Theme Song - "Lost Something" by misi Ke	Grand Final Winner
2019	Beijing To Moscow 北京到莫斯科	Best Actor in a Leading Role - River Huang	Regional Winner - Singapore
2019	Beijing To Moscow 北京到莫斯科	Best Actress in a Leading Role - Jojo Goh	Regional Winner - Singapore
2019	Beijing To Moscow 北京到莫斯科	Best Drama Series	Regional Winner - Singapore
2019	Beijing To Moscow 北京到莫斯科	Best Sound	Regional Winner - Singapore
2019	Workman Diaries 我的打拼日记	Best Promo or Trailer	Regional Winner - Singapore
2020	A Medical Journey 寻医	Best News or Current Affairs Presenter / Anchor - Danny Yeo	Grand Final Winner
2020	Mind's Eye 心眼	Best Drama Series	Regional Winner - Singapore
2020	The Driver 伺机	Best Promo or Trailer	Grand Final Winner
2020	The Driver 伺机	Best Actor in Supporting Role - Fabian Ang	Regional Winner - Singapore
2020	The Driver 伺机	Best Original Programme by a Streamer / OTT	Regional Winner - Singapore
2020	The Driver 伺机	Best Sound	Regional Winner - Singapore
2021	Crouching Tiger Hidden Ghost 卧虎藏鬼	Best Comedy Performance - Allan Wu	Regional Winner - Singapore
2021	Crouching Tiger Hidden Ghost 卧虎藏鬼	Best Comedy Programme	Regional Winner - Singapore
2021	Crouching Tiger Hidden Ghost 卧虎藏鬼	Best Sound	Regional Winner - Singapore
2022	Being Together - A Family Portrait 当我们不在一起	Best Promo or Trailer	Regional Winner - Singapore
2022	Being Together - A Family Portrait 当我们不在一起	Best Voice Artist	Regional Winner - Singapore

=== New York Festival TV & Film Awards ===
Year	Programme	Category	Result
2019	Workman Diaries 我的打拼日记	Community Portraits	Silver Medal
2019	Workman Diaries 我的打拼日记	Digital Documentary	Silver Medal
2019	Workman Diaries 我的打拼日记	Social Issues	Silver Medal
2020	A Medical Journey 寻医	Human Concerns - Mongolia’s Palliative Care	Finalist Award
2020	A Medical Journey 寻医	Social Issues - Vietnam's Cancer Village	Bronze Medal
2020	Beijing To Moscow 北京到莫斯科	Best Performance by an Actor - River Huang	Finalist Award
2020	The Driver 伺机	Best Camerawork	Finalist Award
2020	The Driver 伺机	Best Drama	Finalist Award
2020	The Driver 伺机	Best Mini Series	Finalist Award
2020	The Driver 伺机	Best Performance by an Actress - Jesseca Liu	Finalist Award
2021	Mind's Eye 心眼	Best Direction	Finalist Award
2021	Mind's Eye 心眼	Best Mini Series	Finalist Award
2021	Mind's Eye 心眼	Best Performance Actor - Frederick Lee	Finalist Award
2022	Crouching Tiger Hidden Ghost 卧虎藏鬼	Best Mini-Series	Finalist Award
2022	Crouching Tiger Hidden Ghost 卧虎藏鬼	Best Sound Design	Finalist Award
2022	Cooking For a Cause 特别的食物给特别的你 Episode 1: Taiwan Homeless	Human Concerns	Silver Medal
2022	Cooking For a Cause 特别的食物给特别的你 Episode 2: India Patients	Human Concerns	Bronze Medal
2022	Cooking For a Cause 特别的食物给特别的你 Episode 2: India Patients	Best Host - Darren Lim	Finalist Award
2022	Cooking For a Cause 特别的食物给特别的你 Episode 2: India Patients	Social Issues	Finalist Award
