= 47th Golden Horse Awards =

Award ceremony for Chinese-language films of 2009 and 2010

- Promotional poster
- Date: November 20, 2010
- Site: Taoyuan Arts Center, Taoyuan, Taiwan
- Hosted by: Kevin Tsai and Dee Hsu
- Preshow hosts: Ken Lin and Na Dow
- Organized by: Taipei Golden Horse Film Festival Executive Committee

Highlights
- Best Feature Film: When Love Comes
- Best Director: Chung Mong-hong; The Fourth Portrait
- Best Actor: Ethan Juan; Monga
- Best Actress: Lü Liping; City Monkey
- Most awards: The Fourth Portrait (4); When Love Comes (4)
- Most nominations: When Love Comes (14)

Television in Taiwan
- Channel: TTV

The 47th Golden Horse Awards (Mandarin:第47屆金馬獎) took place on November 20, 2010 at the Taoyuan Arts Center in Taoyuan, Taiwan.

== Winners and nominees ==
Winners are listed first and highlighted in boldface.

| **Best Feature Film**: **When Love Comes**; Seven Days in Heaven; Bodyguards and Assassins; Judge; The Fourth Portrait | **Best Short Film**: **Magabahai**; A Piece of Cake; Crimson Jade; A Suspended Moment |
| **Best Documentary**: **Hip-Hop Storm**; E. Sha Age; Create Something | **Best Animation Feature** - |
| **Best Director**: **Chung Mong-hong — The Fourth Portrait**; Teddy Chan — Bodyguards and Assassins; Chang Tso-chi — When Love Comes; Liu Jie — Judge | **Best New Director**: **Ho Wi-ding — Pinoy Sunday**; Li Weiran — Welcome to Shama Town; Hou Chi-jan — One Day; Derek Tsang and Jimmy Wan — Lover's Discourse |
| **Best Leading Actor**: **Ethan Juan — Monga**; Wang Xueqi — Bodyguards and Assassins; Ni Dahong — Judge; Qin Hao — Spring Fever | **Best Leading Actress**: **Lü Liping — City Monkey**; Tang Wei — Crossing Hennessy; Xu Fan — Aftershock; Sylvia Chang — Buddha Mountain |
| **Best Supporting Actor**: **Wu Pong-fong — Seven Days in Heaven**; Xu Caigen — Apart Together; Nicholas Tse — Bodyguards and Assassins; Kao Meng-chieh — When Love Comes | **Best Supporting Actress**: **Hao Lei — The Fourth Portrait**; Winnie Chang — Seven Days in Heaven; Lü Hsueh-feng — When Love Comes; Zhang Jingchu — Aftershock |
**Best New Performer**: **Lee Chien-na — Juliets**; Winnie Chang — Seven Days in Heaven; Lee Yi-chieh — When Love Comes; Bi Xiao-hai — The Fourth Portrait
| **Audience Choice Award**: **When Love Comes**; Seven Days in Heaven; Bodyguards and Assassins; Judge; The Fourth Portrait | **FIPRESCI Prize** **(award for first and second features)**: **The Fourth Portrait** |
| **Outstanding Taiwanese Film of the Year**: **The Fourth Portrait**; When Love Comes; Seven Days in Heaven | **Outstanding Taiwanese Filmmaker of the Year**: **Lee Lieh**; Essay Liu; Doze Niu |
| **Special Contribution Award**: **Sun Yueh** | **Lifetime Achievement Award**: **Hsu Li-kong** |
