= Golden Bell Award for Best Male Lead in a Television Series =

Taiwanese television awards for Best Actor

- Awarded for: Best Male Lead of the Year in a Television Series
- Location: Taiwan
- Presented by: Golden Bell Awards
- Currently held by: Kaiser Chuang for City Founding Pioneer (2026)

The Golden Bell Award for Best Male Lead in a Television Series (Chinese: 電視金鐘獎戲劇節目最佳男主角獎) is one of the categories of the competition for the Taiwanese television production, Golden Bell Awards. It was presented annually by the Government Information Office until 2011, when the Bureau of Audiovisual and Music Industry Development assumed responsibility for the Golden Bell Award ceremony. The first time that television programs were first eligible to be awarded was in 1971.

== Winners and nominees ==
=== 1980s ===
Year	Actor	English title	Original title	Ref
1980; 15th Golden Bell Awards
1980; 15th Golden Bell Awards	Chiang Ming	Love Corridor	台視劇場－愛情走廊	
1980; 15th Golden Bell Awards	Yue Yang	Heroes	英雄榜	
1980; 15th Golden Bell Awards	Chiang Chang-wen	Tomorrow is Sunday	名劇精選－明天就是星期天	
1981; 16th Golden Bell Awards
1981; 16th Golden Bell Awards	Wu Feng	Risk	戰國風雲	
1981; 16th Golden Bell Awards	Lee Li-chun	Qing Xu Lian Wo Wo Lian Qing	卿須憐我我憐卿	
1981; 16th Golden Bell Awards	Chang Feng	Jiangnan Chun	江南春	
1982; 17th Golden Bell Awards
1982; 17th Golden Bell Awards	Lee Tien-chu	Land of the Undaunted	吾土吾民	
1982; 17th Golden Bell Awards	Ku Pao-ming	He Ain't Stupid, He is My Brother	他不笨，他是我兄弟	
1983; 18th Golden Bell Awards
1983; 18th Golden Bell Awards	Yi Ming	Autumn Cicada	秋蟬	
1984; 19th Golden Bell Awards
1984; 19th Golden Bell Awards	Kou Hsi-shun	The Words of the Wind	金獎劇場－西風的話	
1984; 19th Golden Bell Awards	Chang Feng	Two Endings	兩種結尾	
1984; 19th Golden Bell Awards	Han Su	Star Knows My Heart	星星知我心	
1985; 20th Golden Bell Awards
1985; 20th Golden Bell Awards	Kou Hsi-shun	Last Night Stars	創作劇坊－昨夜星辰	
1985; 20th Golden Bell Awards	Lin Tsai-pei	Autumn Tide Toward the Evening Sky	秋潮向晚天	
1985; 20th Golden Bell Awards	Huang Yung-kuang	Book and Sword of Autumn	書劍千秋	
1986; 21st Golden Bell Awards
1986; 21st Golden Bell Awards	Kou Hsi-shun	One Plum Blossom	一剪梅	
1986; 21st Golden Bell Awards	Chang Feng	Autumn Moon and Spring Breeze	秋月春風	
1986; 21st Golden Bell Awards	Ouyang Long	The Blue and the Black	藍與黑	
1987; 22nd Golden Bell Awards
1987; 22nd Golden Bell Awards	Sihung Lung	Green Lawn	中視劇場－芳草碧連天	
1987; 22nd Golden Bell Awards	Kou Feng	How Many Beautiful Sunsets	幾度夕陽紅	
1987; 22nd Golden Bell Awards	Kou Hsi-shun	Happy Home, All is Well	家和萬事興	
1987; 22nd Golden Bell Awards	Doze Niu	After the Game	華視劇展－遊戲之後	
1987; 22nd Golden Bell Awards	Tsung Hua	Imperial Concubine Yang	楊貴妃	
1988; 23rd Golden Bell Awards
1988; 23rd Golden Bell Awards	Chin Han	Deep Garden	庭院深深	
1988; 23rd Golden Bell Awards	Chang Fu-chien	Beauty	西施	
1988; 23rd Golden Bell Awards	Ko Hsiang-ting	Century of Love	黃金劇場－人間有情系列: 百年深情	
1988; 23rd Golden Bell Awards	Liu Te-kai	Please Do Not Reject Him	台視劇場－請不要拒絕他	
1988; 23rd Golden Bell Awards	Liang Hsiu-shen	Forgiveness	爸爸原諒我	
1989; 24th Golden Bell Awards
1989; 24th Golden Bell Awards	Shen Meng-sheng	August Scent	八月桂花香	
1989; 24th Golden Bell Awards	Meng Yuen	The Last Sweetness	中視劇場-大地有愛系列·最後的馨香	
1989; 24th Golden Bell Awards	Kou Hsi-shun	Diao Chan	貂蟬	
1989; 24th Golden Bell Awards	Doze Niu	Awakening	華視藝術季－甦醒	
1989; 24th Golden Bell Awards	Lei Ming	August Scent	八月桂花香	

=== 1990s ===
Year	Actor	English title	Original title	Ref
1990; 25th Golden Bell Awards
1990; 25th Golden Bell Awards	Steve Ma	Spring Goes, Spring Comes	春去春又回	
1990; 25th Golden Bell Awards	Lei Ming	Cuckoo Sound Reminder	布榖鳥聲聲催	
1990; 25th Golden Bell Awards	Morning Chang	Wo Er Jun Xiao	中視劇場－我兒俊孝	
1991; 26th Golden Bell Awards
1991; 26th Golden Bell Awards	Lee Li-chun	Lovers at the End of an Era	末代兒女情	
1991; 26th Golden Bell Awards	Wang Jui	Colorless Love Series	鹹魚翻身	
1991; 26th Golden Bell Awards	Damian Lau	Lovers at the End of an Era	末代兒女情	
1992; 27th Golden Bell Awards
1992; 27th Golden Bell Awards	Jin Chao-chun	Jing Cheng Si Shao	京城四少	
1992; 27th Golden Bell Awards	Morning Chang	Jing Cheng Si Shao	京城四少	
1992; 27th Golden Bell Awards	Damian Lau	Till We Meet Again	江湖再見	
1992; 27th Golden Bell Awards	Steve Ma	Xue Ke	雪珂	
1993; 28th Golden Bell Awards
1993; 28th Golden Bell Awards	Shih Ying	Career Master	草地狀元	
1993; 28th Golden Bell Awards	Chang Fu-chien	Unforgettable	意難忘	
1993; 28th Golden Bell Awards	Morning Chang	Going Home	中視劇場－悲歡人生系列：回家	
1994; 29th Golden Bell Awards
1994; 29th Golden Bell Awards	n/a (Note: During this time, Television and Radio broadcasting were awarded alternatively. This year, it was Radio Broadcasting."Archived copy". Archived from the original on 2014-10-18..)			
1995; 30th Golden Bell Awards
1995; 30th Golden Bell Awards	Weng Chia-ming	The Legend of Empress Dowager Cixi	戲說慈禧	
1995; 30th Golden Bell Awards	Jin Chao-chun	Justice Bao	包青天－真假包公	
1995; 30th Golden Bell Awards	Chen Sung-young	Brotherhood	兄弟有緣	
1996; 31st Golden Bell Awards
1996; 31st Golden Bell Awards	n/a			
1997; 32nd Golden Bell Awards
1997; 32nd Golden Bell Awards	Tien Feng	Snow of That Year	人生四季：下雪的那一年	
1997; 32nd Golden Bell Awards	Sihung Lung	Dream Soil	夢土	
1997; 32nd Golden Bell Awards	Lung Shao-hua	The Taiwan Folklore	台灣水滸傳	
1997; 32nd Golden Bell Awards	Chen Hui-lou	Half of Heaven	人生四季：半個天堂	
1997; 32nd Golden Bell Awards	Chao Tzu-chiang	We Are Family	我們一家都是人：我的愛是檸檬樹	
1998; 33rd Golden Bell Awards
1998; 33rd Golden Bell Awards	n/a			
1999; 34th Golden Bell Awards
1999; 34th Golden Bell Awards	Lee Kwan	Awake	華視劇展－醒	
1999; 34th Golden Bell Awards	Chu Chung-heng	The General's Command	將軍令	
1999; 34th Golden Bell Awards	Chang Shih	Sounds of Rainbow	金鐘劇展－聽彩虹的聲音	
1999; 34th Golden Bell Awards	Chang Po-chou	Chun Cheng's Life	台灣作家劇場－春成的賠命錢	
1999; 34th Golden Bell Awards	Tao Chuan-cheng	Runaway	華視劇展－出走	

=== 2000s ===
Year	Actor	English title	Original title	Ref
2000; 35th Golden Bell Awards
2000; 35th Golden Bell Awards	Hsiao Hou-tao	Abba	大愛劇場－阿爸	
2000; 35th Golden Bell Awards	Leon Dai	The Pact of Choshui River	濁水溪的契約	
2000; 35th Golden Bell Awards	Chang Feng	I Want a Divorce	千禧劇展－我要離婚	
2000; 35th Golden Bell Awards	Doze Niu	Xiaoguang	千禧劇展－曉光	
2000; 35th Golden Bell Awards	Timothy Chao	Men's Paradise	民視劇場－男人天堂	
2001; 36th Golden Bell Awards
2001; 36th Golden Bell Awards	Wang Shih-hsien	Rogue Professor	流氓教授	
2001; 36th Golden Bell Awards	Chiu Hsin-chih	Stupid Kid	笨小孩	
2001; 36th Golden Bell Awards	Chien Chang	Wake Up, Mom	大愛劇場－阿母醒來吧	
2001; 36th Golden Bell Awards	Lung Shao-hua	Beigang Burner	北港香爐	
2001; 36th Golden Bell Awards	Dicky Cheung	The Duke of Mount Deer	鹿鼎記	
2002; 37th Golden Bell Awards
2002; 37th Golden Bell Awards	Shih Chun	Cold Night	寒夜	
2002; 37th Golden Bell Awards	Shen Meng-sheng	Virtuous Women, Martyred Women and Uninhibited Women	貞女、烈女、豪放女	
2002; 37th Golden Bell Awards	Lee Wei	Toast Boy's Kiss	吐司男之吻	
2002; 37th Golden Bell Awards	Liang Hsiu-shen	Sunshine	後山先日照	
2002; 37th Golden Bell Awards	Ku Pao-ming	Orange Dusk	大愛劇場－橘色黃昏	
2003; 38th Golden Bell Awards
2003; 38th Golden Bell Awards	Huo Cheng-chi	Home	家	
2003; 38th Golden Bell Awards	Liang Hsiu-shen	Home	家	
2003; 38th Golden Bell Awards	Ho Hao-chieh	Follow the Wind	大愛劇場－聞風而來	
2003; 38th Golden Bell Awards	Wing Fan	Crystal Boys	孽子	
2003; 38th Golden Bell Awards	Tuo Tsung-hua	Crystal Boys	孽子	
2004; 39th Golden Bell Awards
2004; 39th Golden Bell Awards	Chien Chang	Quartet	大愛劇場－四重奏	
2004; 39th Golden Bell Awards	Morning Chang	Upmost Sun	日正當中	
2004; 39th Golden Bell Awards	Ho Hao-chieh	Supernatural Phone	手機有鬼	
2004; 39th Golden Bell Awards	Lan Cheng-lung	Cold Fronts	冷鋒過境	
2004; 39th Golden Bell Awards	Hsieh Tsu-wu	Love Go Go	愛情來了	
2005; 40th Golden Bell Awards	Chao Hsueh-huang	A Story of Soldiers	再見 忠貞二村	
2005; 40th Golden Bell Awards	Tuo Tsung-hua	Love's Lone Flower	孤戀花	
2005; 40th Golden Bell Awards	Lee Lee-zen	The Unforgettable Memory	意難忘	
2005; 40th Golden Bell Awards	Eli Shih	A Cinematic Journey	浪淘沙	
2005; 40th Golden Bell Awards	Show Lo	The Outsiders II	鬥魚II	
2006; 41st Golden Bell Awards	Chu Lu-hao	Love Drama: Outside the Window, the Sky is Blue	大愛劇場-窗外有蘭天	
2006; 41st Golden Bell Awards	Lee Tien-chu	The Golden Years	大愛劇場：流金歲月	
2006; 41st Golden Bell Awards	Sam Tseng	Eighth Happiness	八星報喜	
2006; 41st Golden Bell Awards	Lin Yo-wei	45°C Under the Sky	45°C天空下	
2006; 41st Golden Bell Awards	Tony Yang	Holy Ridge	聖稜的星光	
2007; 42nd Golden Bell Awards	Hsia Ching-ting	Love Drama: Clear Night	大愛劇場: 晚晴	
2007; 42nd Golden Bell Awards	River Huang	Dangerous Minds	危險心靈	
2007; 42nd Golden Bell Awards	Kang Ting	Life Outside	出外人生	
2007; 42nd Golden Bell Awards	Yu An-shun	Sago Palm Blossoms	鐵樹花開	
2007; 42nd Golden Bell Awards	Leon Dai	The Hospital	白色巨塔	
2008; 43rd Golden Bell Awards	Morning Chang	Your Home is My Home	歡喜來逗陣	
2008; 43rd Golden Bell Awards	Lei Hung	Mom's House	娘家	
2008; 43rd Golden Bell Awards	Chang Shan-wei	Hakka Drama: Youth	客家文學大戲: 菸田少年	
2008; 43rd Golden Bell Awards	Eddie Peng	Wayward Kenting	我在墾丁*天氣晴	
2008; 43rd Golden Bell Awards	James Wen	General Xu Pangxing	大將徐傍興	
2009; 44th Golden Bell Awards	Vic Chou	Black & White	痞子英雄	
2009; 44th Golden Bell Awards	Mark Chao	Black & White	痞子英雄	
2009; 44th Golden Bell Awards	Chang Shih	Justice For Love	天平上的馬爾濟斯	
2009; 44th Golden Bell Awards	Yu An-shun	Love Drama: Sweet Taste	大愛劇場：走過好味道	
2009; 44th Golden Bell Awards	Show Lo	Hot Shot	籃球火	

=== 2010s ===
Year	Actor	English title	Original title	Ref
2010; 45th Golden Bell Awards	Matt Wu	The Kite Soaring	客家劇場: 牽紙鷂的手	
2010; 45th Golden Bell Awards	Wu Cheng-ti	Da Ai Drama: Moonlight of Brotherhood	大愛劇場: 情義月光	
2010; 45th Golden Bell Awards	Morning Chang	Night Market Life	夜市人生	
2010; 45th Golden Bell Awards	James Wen	The Happy Times of That Year	那一年的幸福時光	
2010; 45th Golden Bell Awards	Show Lo	Hi My Sweetheart	海派甜心	
2011; 46th Golden Bell Awards	Chin Shih-chieh	The Invaluable Treasure 1949	瑰寶1949	
2011; 46th Golden Bell Awards	Will Pan	Endless Love	愛∞無限	
2011; 46th Golden Bell Awards	Joseph Chang	Love You	醉後決定愛上你	
2011; 46th Golden Bell Awards	James Wen	The Fierce Wife	犀利人妻	
2011; 46th Golden Bell Awards	Lung Shao-hua	Da Ai Drama: Roadside CEO	大愛劇場—路邊董事長	
2012; 47th Golden Bell Awards	Lung Shao-hua	Way back Into Love	愛。回來	
2012; 47th Golden Bell Awards	Chen Bolin	In Time with You	我可能不會愛你	
2012; 47th Golden Bell Awards	Jag Huang	Innocence	客家劇場—阿戇妹	
2012; 47th Golden Bell Awards	Huang Pin-yuan	Rainy Night Flower	雨夜花	
2012; 47th Golden Bell Awards	Tony Yang	Ex-boyfriend	前男友	
2013; 48th Golden Bell Awards
2013; 48th Golden Bell Awards	Vic Chou	Home	回家	
2013; 48th Golden Bell Awards	Lin Chia-wei	End of Innocence	死了一個國中生之後	
2013; 48th Golden Bell Awards	Mo Tzu-yi	An Innocent Mistake	罪美麗	
2013; 48th Golden Bell Awards	Jag Huang	Falling	含苞欲墜的每一天	
2013; 48th Golden Bell Awards	Lung Shao-hua	Flavor of Life	含笑食堂	
2014; 49th Golden Bell Awards
2014; 49th Golden Bell Awards	Christopher Lee	A Good Wife	親愛的，我愛上別人了	
2014; 49th Golden Bell Awards	Junior Han	Sun After the Rain	雨後驕陽	
2014; 49th Golden Bell Awards	Hans Chung	Boys Can Fly	刺蝟男孩	
2014; 49th Golden Bell Awards	Chang Ting-hu	Boys Can Fly	刺蝟男孩	
2014; 49th Golden Bell Awards	Lan Cheng-lung	Chocolat	流氓蛋糕店	
2015; 50th Golden Bell Awards
2015; 50th Golden Bell Awards	Lan Cheng-lung	Apple in Your Eye	妹妹	
2015; 50th Golden Bell Awards	Wu Kang-jen	Long Day's Journey into Light	客家劇場—出境事務所	
2015; 50th Golden Bell Awards	Kurt Chou	Crime Scene Investigation Center	C.S.I.C鑑識英雄	
2015; 50th Golden Bell Awards	Weber Yang	The Way We Were	16個夏天	
2015; 50th Golden Bell Awards	Lan Wei-hua	Chocolat	客家劇場—新丁花開	
2016; 51st Golden Bell Awards
2016; 51st Golden Bell Awards	Wu Kang-jen	A Touch of Green	一把青	
2016; 51st Golden Bell Awards	Kingone Wang	The Day I Lost U	失去你的那一天	
2016; 51st Golden Bell Awards	Roy Chiu	Marry Me, or Not?	必娶女人	
2016; 51st Golden Bell Awards	Fu Meng-po	Ba Ji Teenagers	一代新兵 八極少年	
2016; 51st Golden Bell Awards	Shan Cheng-ju	Sunset	落日	
2017; 52nd Golden Bell Awards
2017; 52nd Golden Bell Awards	Wu Kang-jen	Love of Sandstorm	植劇場－戀愛沙塵暴	
2017; 52nd Golden Bell Awards	Wes Lo	High 5 Basketball	High 5制霸青春	
2017; 52nd Golden Bell Awards	Liu Te-kai	Never Forget Then	這些年 那些事	
2017; 52nd Golden Bell Awards	Fan Kuang-yao	Love of Sandstorm	植劇場－戀愛沙塵暴	
2017; 52nd Golden Bell Awards	Lan Cheng-lung	Jiang Teacher, You Talked About Love It	植劇場－姜老師，妳談過戀愛嗎?	
2018; 53rd Golden Bell Awards
2018; 53rd Golden Bell Awards	Lego Lee	Wake Up 2	麻醉風暴2	
2018; 53rd Golden Bell Awards	Derek Chang	My Dear Boy	我的男孩	
2018; 53rd Golden Bell Awards	Mo Tzu-yi	Roseki	客家劇場–台北歌手	
2018; 53rd Golden Bell Awards	Jag Huang	Wake Up 2	麻醉風暴2	
2018; 53rd Golden Bell Awards	Crowd Lu	A Boy Named Flora A	植劇場-花甲男孩轉大人	
2019; 54th Golden Bell Awards
2019; 54th Golden Bell Awards	Wang Shih-hsien	Crime Scene Investigation Center 2	鑑識英雄II 正義之戰	
2019; 54th Golden Bell Awards	Wu Cheng-Di	Survive	日據時代的十種生存法則	
2019; 54th Golden Bell Awards	Wu Kang-ren	The World Between Us	我們與惡的距離	
2019; 54th Golden Bell Awards	James Wen	A Taiwanese Tale of Two Cities	雙城故事	
2019; 54th Golden Bell Awards	Lung Shao-hua	A Taste to Remember	菜頭梗的滋味	

=== 2020s ===
Year	Actor	English title	Original title	Ref
2020; 55th Golden Bell Awards	Yao Chun-yao	The Mirror	鏡子森林	
2020; 55th Golden Bell Awards	Joseph Chang	The Victims' Game	誰是被害者	
2020; 55th Golden Bell Awards	Kaiser Chuang	Hate The Sin, Love The Sinner	噬罪者	
2020; 55th Golden Bell Awards	Greg Hsu	Someday Or One Day	想見你	
2020; 55th Golden Bell Awards	Emerson Tsai	Coolie	苦力	
2021; 56th Golden Bell Awards	Hsueh Shih-ling	Born Into Loving Hands	生生世世	
2021; 56th Golden Bell Awards	Auston Li	The Magician on the Skywalk	天橋上的魔術師	
2021; 56th Golden Bell Awards	Shih Ming-shuai	Animal Whisper	黑喵知情	
2021; 56th Golden Bell Awards	Ryan Tang	My Beautiful Family	我家的美好時光	
2021; 56th Golden Bell Awards	Jeffery Hsu	U Motherbaker	我的婆婆怎麼那麼可愛	
2022; 57th Golden Bell Awards	Berant Zhu	Danger Zone	逆局	
2022; 57th Golden Bell Awards	Camake Valaule	Seqalu: Formosa 1867	斯卡羅	
2022; 57th Golden Bell Awards	Kuo Tzu-chien	Gold Leaf	茶金	
2022; 57th Golden Bell Awards	Chen Ya-lan	Lord Jiaqing and The Journey to Taiwan	嘉慶君遊台灣	
2022; 57th Golden Bell Awards	Yo Yang	Light the Night	華燈初上	
2022; 57th Golden Bell Awards	James Wen	Gold Leaf	茶金	
2023; 58th Golden Bell Awards	Wu Kang-ren	Copycat Killer	模仿犯	
2023; 58th Golden Bell Awards	Frederick Lee	Taiwan Crime Stories - A Matter of Life and Death	台灣犯罪故事-生死困局	
2023; 58th Golden Bell Awards	Yao Chun-yao	Copycat Killer	模仿犯	
2023; 58th Golden Bell Awards	Emerson Tsai	Oxcart Trails	牛車來去	
2023; 58th Golden Bell Awards	Hsueh Shih-ling	Taiwan Crime Stories - Derailment	台灣犯罪故事-出軌	
2024; 59th Golden Bell Awards	Wu Kang-ren	Living	有生之年	
2024; 59th Golden Bell Awards	Alex Ko	Mr. Lighter	女兒大人加個賴	
2024; 59th Golden Bell Awards	Fu Meng-po	Gourmet Affairs	美食無間	
2024; 59th Golden Bell Awards	Tseng Jing-hua	Oh No! Here Comes Trouble	不良執念清除師	
2024; 59th Golden Bell Awards	Terrance Lau	At The Moment	此時此刻	
2025; 60th Golden Bell Awards	Wayne Sung	A Second Chance of Life	血•捨人生	
2025; 60th Golden Bell Awards	Alex Ko	Our Honorary Photo Studio	阿榮與阿玉	
2025; 60th Golden Bell Awards	Fandy Fan	Monday Again?!	X！又是星期一	
2025; 60th Golden Bell Awards	Liên Bỉnh Phát	The Outlaw Doctor	化外之醫	
2025; 60th Golden Bell Awards	Yo Yang	Us Without Sex	今夜一起為愛鼓掌	
2026; 61st Golden Bell Awards	Vic Chou	The World Between Us: After The Flames	我們與惡的距離II	
2026; 61st Golden Bell Awards	Kaiser Chuang	City Founding Pioneer	都市開基祖	
2026; 61st Golden Bell Awards	Jack Tan	Oops! I'm In Jail	監所男子囚生記	
2026; 61st Golden Bell Awards	Tseng Jing-hua	Had I Not Seen The Sun	如果我不曾見過太陽	
2026; 61st Golden Bell Awards	Xie Zhang-ying	Zero Day Attack	零日攻擊	
