= A Taiwanese Tale of Two Cities =

2018 Mandarin-language television series

- Promotional poster

Chinese name
- Traditional Chinese: 雙城故事
Transcriptions
Standard Mandarin
- Hanyu Pinyin: Shuāng Chéng Gùshì
- Genre: Slice of life, Romance, Drama
- Written by: Nancy Yiyu Chen; Chia Huei Lin; Chih Chi Fan; Ling Hui Chen; Ye Dan-qing; Yeh Tien-lun
- Directed by: Yeh Tien-lun
- Starring: Tammy Chen; Peggy Tseng; James Wen
- Country of origin: Taiwan
- Original languages: Mandarin, English
- No. of seasons: 1
- No. of episodes: 20

Production
- Producers: Chin Sheng Yeh; Tama Pan
- Running time: 90 minutes
- Production companies: kbro Inc. Formosa Television; Good Image Co., Ltd. Green Film Production; Taiwan Mobile; Mandarin Vision

Original release
- Network: Netflix; PTS; FTV
- Release: September 1, 2018 – January 26, 2019

A Taiwanese Tale of Two Cities (Chinese: 雙城故事) is a 2018 Mandarin-language TV series of 20 episodes starring Tammy Chen, Peggy Tseng and James Wen. The plot revolves around a Taipei doctor and a San Francisco engineer who swap homes with each other in a pact, and its consequences.

The story is based on the arrangements of a Taiwanese girl living in Dadaocheng, Taipei, Taiwan and a Taiwanese girl who grew up in San Francisco, California, United States. From two perspectives, they depict contemporary people's attitudes and life perspective, presenting sparks of different cultures.

It was released on September 1, 2018, on Taiwanese Public Television Service.

== Cast ==
- Tammy Chen as Lee Nien-Nien
- Peggy Tseng as Josephine Huang
- James Wen as Teng Tien-Ming
- Lung Shao-hua as Lee Jen-Kuei
- Denny Huang as Ryan Yeh
- Poh-Shiang Lee as Hsiao-Meng
- Yi-Wen Yen as Wu Ching-Wen
- Yang Li-yin as Amy Chen
- Mei-Ling Lo as Floss
- Wanfang as Chien-Hui

== Release ==
A Taiwanese Tale of Two Cities was released on September 1, 2018, on Taiwanese Public Television Service alongside Netflix outside Taiwan. The series was aired the next day on Formosa Television, which is also where the series was aired it again in 2020. Both PTS & Formosa TV airing was only available on the linear TV (both terrestrial and cable TV), meaning that online TV airing was not available other than Taiwan Mobile's myVideo and Netflix.

== Soundtrack ==
- Love Yourself by Wanfang (Opening Theme)
- Make Me Listen by Holly Lou
- Never the Point by The Empire (Closing Theme)
- No Regrets, Only Love (沒遺憾，只有愛) by Rose Liu (Closing Theme on second airing)
- The Ripples by Tommy Ljungberg
- 21st Century Jam by terrytyelee
- Bottom Line Acoustic ver. (底線 Acoustic) by Julia Wu
- Blue Magic Sunday by terrytyelee
- Life's Thinking About You by Parking Lot Pimp
- Uh Huh by Ape Kao
- Turn Up The Night To Music by terrytyelee
- You Win This Time (這次算妳贏拉) by terrytyelee
- Find A Way by Julia Wu
- H.E.N.R.Y by Julia Wu
- Marching Forward (向前走) by Lim Giong
- Babymama (我孩的媽) by BOi!
- Gravity by BOi!
- RiDE by BOi! feat. Xina Sui
- Call it a day - Tommy Ljungberg (This TV series doesn't put this song on, but still featured it anyway.)

== Awards and nominations ==
Year	Ceremony	Category	Nominee	Result
2019	54th Golden Bell Awards	Best Television Series	A Taiwanese Tale of Two Cities	Nominated
2019	54th Golden Bell Awards	Best Leading Actor in a Television Series	James Wen	Nominated
2019	54th Golden Bell Awards	Best Leading Actress in a Television Series	Peggy Tseng	Nominated
2019	54th Golden Bell Awards	Best Supporting Actor in a Television Series	Lung Shao-hua	Nominated
2019	54th Golden Bell Awards	Best Director in a Television Series	Yeh Tien-lun	Nominated
2019	54th Golden Bell Awards	Best Writing for a Television Series	Nancy Yiyu Chen, Chia Huei Lin, Chih Chi Fan, Ling Hui Chen, Ye Dan-qing, Yeh Tien-lun	Nominated
2019	2019 Asian Academy Creative Awards	Best Actor in a Supporting Role	Lung Shao-hua	Nominated
