= Gold leaf (disambiguation) =

A gold leaf is a thin gold foil used for decoration.

Gold leaf or Goldleaf may also refer to:

- Gold Leaf Award, a precursor of the Juno Awards
- Gold-leaf electroscope, a historical scientific instrument
- Gold Leaf (TV series), 2021 Taiwanese television series
- Gold Leaf, a cigarette brand of John Player & Sons
- Gold Leaf Team Lotus, 1968 to 1971 cigarette-sponsored name of Team Lotus
