= The Ghost Tales =

- Traditional Chinese: 變羊記
- Hanyu Pinyin: Biànyáng jì
- Hokkien POJ: Piàn-iûⁿ kì
- Directed by: Tso Shih-chiang
- Written by: Tso Shih-chiang
- Starring: River Huang; Lorene Ren; Lee Yi-chieh; Wu Pong-fong; Tsai Chen-nan; James Wen
- Production company: Husishi Films Co.
- Distributed by: Swallow Wings Films Co.
- Release date: September 7, 2012; (Taiwan)
- Country: Taiwan
- Budget: NT$35,000,000

The Ghost Tales (Chinese: 變羊記) is a 2012 Taiwanese psychological horror film directed by Tso Shih-chiang.

== Plot ==
Sung Ting-Po is a debt-ridden businessperson. Just as he is planning to go deep into the woods to kill himself, he runs into a ghost. Ting-Po has long already given up on life and decides to mess with the ghost, who is actually quite timid and turns into a goat. The goat is then picked up by A-chuan, himself a talented gardening enthusiast, who has just left the military and takes both his younger sister and the goat to live in a dilapidated block of flats. At this time, through his gardening connections, A-chuan is staging a performance with a former schoolmate. A-chuan covets a precious bonsai arrangement valued at over a million NTD, and he gradually loses all rational perspective; even his girlfriend leaves him. Within all of this, the situation envelopes peoples' spirits as things continuously spiral out of control, and the darkness and fear devour all sense of reason.

== Cast ==
- River Huang as A-chuan
- Lorene Ren as Lo Fen
- Lee Yi-chieh as Chi
- Wu Pong-fong as Big Chung / Ghost
- Tsai Chen-nan as Sung Ting-Po
- James Wen as Senior schoolmate
- Julianne Chu
- Nelson Shen as Ching

== Production ==
Tso Shih-chiang reported coming up with the initial concept for the story 10 years before filming began. The film received the largest film subsidy possible in 2011, and filming began in July of the same year.

== Release ==
The film premiered at Yuan Ze University on 10 August 2012 as part of the 'National Roaming Battalion of Literature and Art' festival (Chinese: 全國巡迴文藝營) before release on 7 September.
