= Dangerous Minds (disambiguation) =

Dangerous Minds is a 1995 drama film starring Michelle Pfeiffer.

Dangerous Minds may also refer to:

== Television ==
- Dangerous Minds (TV series), a TV series based on the 1995 film
- "Dangerous Minds" (L.A.'s Finest), an episode of the American action series L.A.'s Finest
- "Dangerous Minds" (Xiaolin Showdown), an episode of the American cartoon Xiaolin Showdown
- Dangerous Mind, a drama series in Taiwan

== See also ==
- Dangerous Minds (soundtrack), the soundtrack to the 1995 film
- "Dangerous Mind", a song by Korean boy band TVXQ from their album Rising Sun
- Dangerous Minds, a website hosted by television presenter and author Richard Metzger
- Dangerous Minds, a 2017 book by Hussain Zaidi
- "Dangerous Mindz", a 1997 song by Gravediggaz
