= The Year of Happiness and Love =

2009 Taiwanese television series

- Promotional poster
- Also known as: 那一年的幸福時光; Na Yi Nian De Xing Fu Shi Guang
- Genre: Romance, Comedy
- Starring: James Wen; Amber Kuo
- Opening theme: "近在眼前" Jin Zai Yan Qian by Peter Pan (潘裕文)
- Ending theme: "幸福時光" Xing Fu De Shi Guang by Peter Pan and Ring Hsu
- Country of origin: Taiwan
- Original language: Mandarin
- No. of episodes: 21

Production
- Producers: Chen Xi Sheng; Hu Jia Jun; Chen Yi Jun hang Yu Qing
- Production location: Taiwan
- Production company: Sanlih E-Television (SETTV)

Original release
- Network: Taiwan Television (TTV)
- Release: 7 August 2009 – 1 January 2010

Related
- Play Ball; Lucky Days

The Year of Happiness and Love (Chinese: 那一年的幸福時光; pinyin: Na Yi Nian De Xing Fu Shi Guang) is a 2009 Taiwanese drama starring James Wen and Amber Kuo. It was produced by Sanlih E-Television.

The series was first broadcast in Taiwan on free-to-air Taiwan Television (TTV) from 7 August 2009 to 1 January 2010, every Friday at 22:00 to 23:35 and cable TV Sanlih E-Television on 8 August 2009 to 2 January 2010, every Saturday at 22:30.

The Year of Happiness and Love was nominated in 2010 for four awards at the 45th Golden Bell Awards, including Best Actress for Amber Kuo and Best Actor for James Wen.

== Synopsis ==
Jiang Chen Bo (James Wen) is the typical loser: He is not fashionable or charming and has no money, girlfriend or respect. Then, an out of the blue promotion changes his world. Suddenly, he becomes the beacon to his father's rather uneventful life, the love bridge between his elite boss and his innocent younger sister, the moneytree for his gold-digging lover. However, things that come easily, go easily. The news of him quitting his job caused his lover to leave him, his father to have a stroke, and his sister to break off contact with his ex-boss. He tries to come up with plans to make everything better, only to have them backfire on him. But, family is always there to help him pick up the pieces.

== Cast ==
- James Wen as Jiang Chen Bo
- Amber Kuo as Chen Su Xin
- Wu Nien-jen as Chen Ding He
- Kay Huang as Jiang Li Mei
- Weber Yang as Lin Ying Jie
- Ko I-chen as Lin Chang Shou
- Lawrence Ko as Lin Ying Hao
- Tsai Chen-nan as A Sheng
- Lin Mei-hsiu as Xiu Yu
- Sonia Sui as Huang Guo Fen
- Wu Ding Qian as Huang Guo Zhi
- Adriene Lin as Bi Er
- Luo Bei An as Lawyer Zhao
- Zhu De Gang as Manager Gao
- Ivy Fan as Maggie
- Chen Xi Sheng as Master
- Peter Pan as Yi Ping 一平
- Hong Sheng Wen as Simon

== Awards and nominations ==
45th Golden Bell Awards - 2010
Recipients	Category	Result
James Wen	Best Actor	Nominated
Amber Kuo	Best Actress	Nominated
The Year of Happiness and Love	Best Marketing Programme	Nominated
The Year of Happiness and Love	Best Advertising Campaign	Nominated
