= James Wen =

Taiwanese actor

- 溫昇豪
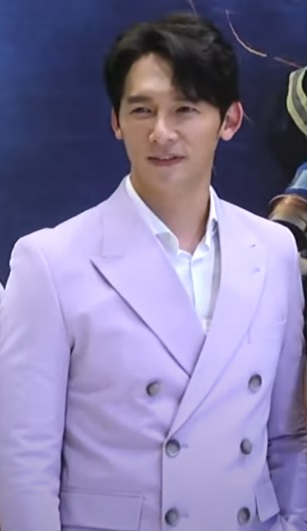
- Wen in April 2021
- Born: 22 February 1978 (age 48); Kaohsiung, Taiwan
- Education: Shih Hsin University (BA)
- Occupations: Actor, model, television host
- Years active: 2006–present
- Spouse: Xiao Jun (m. 2013)
- Children: 1

Chinese name
- Traditional Chinese: 溫昇豪
- Simplified Chinese: 温升豪
- Hanyu Pinyin: Wēn Shēngháo
- Pha̍k-fa-sṳ: Vûn Sin-hò
- Hokkien POJ: Un Seng-hô

James Wen (traditional Chinese: 溫昇豪; simplified Chinese: 温升豪; pinyin: Wēn Shēngháo; Pe̍h-ōe-jī: Un Seng-hô; Pha̍k-fa-sṳ: Vûn Sin-hò; born 22 February 1978) is a Taiwanese actor, former reporter and model. He is known for his supporting performance in Taiwanese drama My Queen, for which he received one of his four Golden Bell Awards nominations. According to Yahoo! Search, Wen was the 9th most searched celebrity from January to April 2009.

== Life and career ==
Wen's ancestral home is in Gaoshu, Pingtung but was born in Kaohsiung. He graduated from College of Journalism and Communication at Shih Hsin University. In 1999 Wen won Most Photogenic Award at the Men's UNO model contest, subsequently worked as a model and reporter before turning to acting.

== Selected filmography ==
=== Television series ===
Year	English title	Chinese title	Role
2005	Numbers	數字拼圖NUMBERS	Wang Jian Guo (王建國)
2006	Happiness Agency	幸福派出所	Zhang Guo En (張國恩)
2006	Lonely Game	寂寞的遊戲	Guest star
2006	Dangerous Mind	危險心靈	Zhan Chao Wei (詹朝威)
2007	Internet Love Novel	網路情書	Juan Niao (倦鳥)
2007	Emigrant Heaven	移民天堂	Qiu Mu Sheng (邱木勝)
2007	The War of Betrayal 1895	亂世豪門	Wang Wen Jie (王文傑)
2008	General Xu Pangxing	大將徐傍興	Xu Bang Xing (徐傍興)
2008	Colourful Quiet Sea	彩色寧靜海	Pan Chao Sen (潘朝森)
2008	Happiness of the Bicycle	腳踏車的祝福	Wu Yong (吳永昇)
2009	My Queen	敗犬女王	Song Yun Hao (宋允浩)
2009	Play Ball	比賽開始	Military police (ep 1)
2009	The Happy Times of That Year	那一年的幸福時光	Jiang Chen Bo (江陳博)
2009	Autumn's Concerto	下一站，幸福	Liang Yun Zhong (梁允中) - Liang Mu Cheng's father
2010	Spring	源	Wu Lin Fang's father (吳霖芳之父)
2010	PS Man	偷心大聖PS男	Meng Cheng En (孟成恩)
2010	The Fierce Wife	犀利人妻	Wen Rui Fan (溫瑞凡)
2010	Gloomy Salad Days	死神少女	Du Ji (杜驥)
2010	Lost and Found	小孩.狗	
2011	"Office Girls"	小資女孩向前衝	Yu Cheng Feng (余承風)
2011	Waking Love Up	愛情睡醒了	Chou Yan (仇岩)
2012	Gung Hay Fat Choy	我們發財了	Jiang Yu Hao
2013	"King Flower"	金大花的華麗冒險	Lin Guan Jun (林冠軍)
2014	Aim High	22K夢想高飛	Liang Jin-de (梁晉德)
2015	"Ma Ma Xiang Hua Er Yi Yang"	妈妈像花儿一样	Yan Jun (严俊)
2016	My Little Princess	親愛的，公主病	Zheng Meng-xi (鄭孟熙)
2018	A Taiwanese Tale of Two Cities	雙城故事	Deng Tian-ming (鄧天明)
2019	The World Between Us	我們與惡的距離	Liu Zhao-guo (劉昭國)
2019	Best Interest	最佳利益	Zhao Li-ting (趙立廷)
2019	The Making of an Ordinary Woman	俗女養成記	Jiang Xian-rong (江顯榮)
2021	Light the Night	華燈初上	Lo Li-nung
2023	Deep End	深網	
2024	Kill Sera Sera	誰殺了她	

=== Film ===
- Melody-Go-Round (2022)
- Acting Out of Love (2020)
- Begin, Again (2019)
- The Dossier of Jincheng (2017)
- Fist Sword (2017)
- High Heels (2015)
- Light Love (2012)
- My Dear Stilt (2012)
- The Ghost Tales (2012)
- The Fierce Wife (2012)
- Night Market Hero (2011)
- Zoom Hunting (2010)
- Tears (2010)
- A Place of One's Own (2009)
- 1895 (2008)

=== Music video appearances ===
- "結婚進行曲" (Wedding March) by Andy Lau
- 2008 - "如煙" (Like Smoke) from Poetry of the Day After by Mayday
- 2010 - "亮晶晶" (Star Bright) from Star Bright by China Dolls
- 2013 - "何苦" (Why Bother)

== Awards and nominations ==
Golden Bell Awards
Year	Ceremony	Category	Nominated work	Result	Ref
2005	40th	Best Leading Actor in a Television Series	Numbers	Nominated	
2008	43rd	Best Leading Actor in a Television Series	General Xu Pangxing	Nominated	
2009	44th	Best Supporting Actor in a Television Series	My Queen	Nominated	
2010	45th	Best Leading Actor in a Television Series	The Happy Times of That Year	Nominated	
2011	46th	Best Leading Actor in a Television Series	The Fierce Wife	Nominated	
2019	54th	Best Supporting Actor in a Television Series	The World Between Us	Won	
2019	54th	Best Leading Actor in a Television Series	A Taiwanese Tale of Two Cities	Nominated	
2022	57th	Best Leading Actor in a Television Series	Gold Leaf	Nominated	

In 2016, Wen was nominated for Best Performance by an Actor in the International Emmy Awards for his role in Echoes in Time.
