= Yeh Tien-lun =

Taiwanese film director

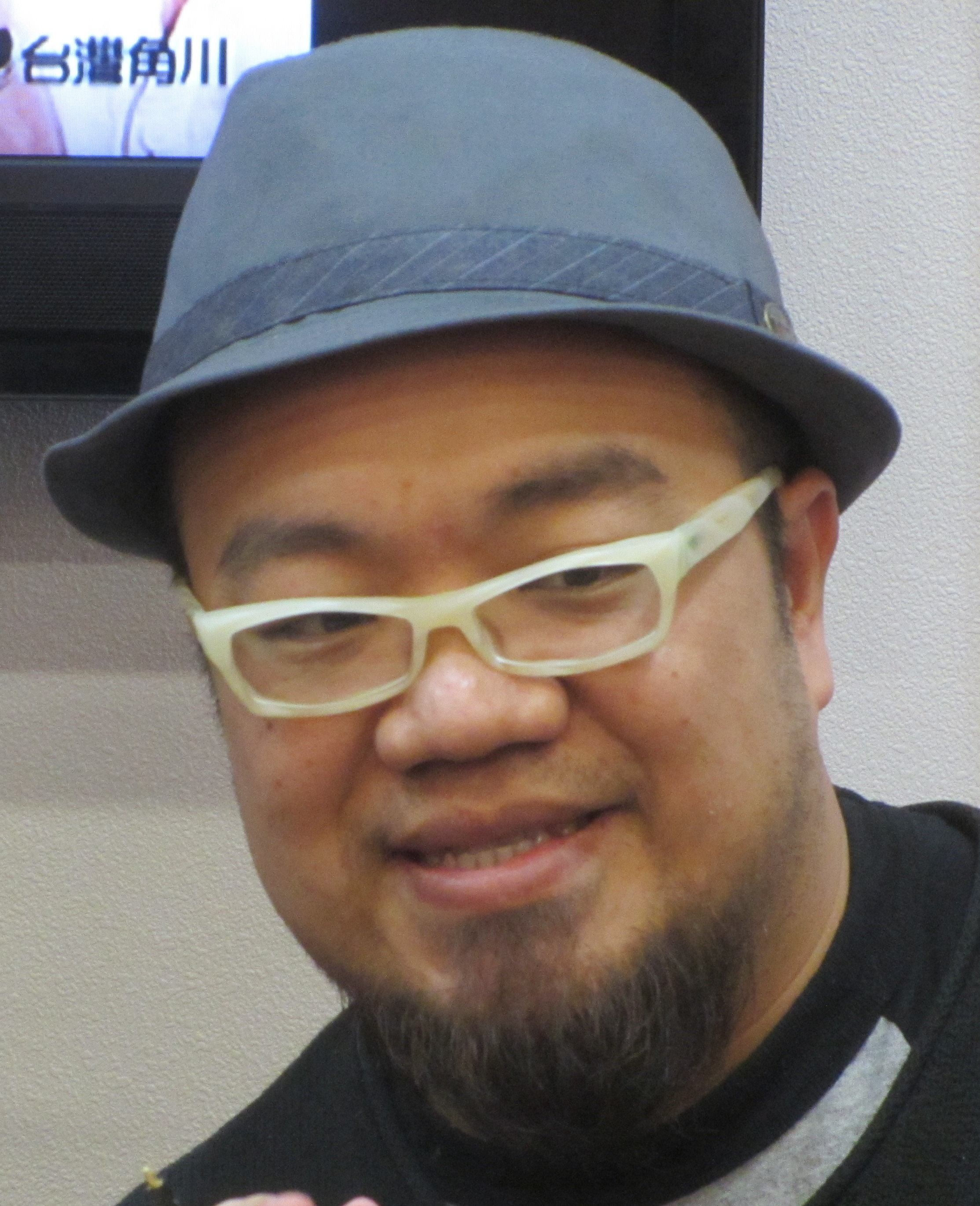
Yeh at the 2014 Taipei International Book Exhibition

Yeh Tien-lun (Chinese: 葉天倫; Pe̍h-ōe-jī: Ia̍p Thian-lûn; born 1975) or Nelson Yeh is a Taiwanese film director.

== Early life and career ==
Yeh Tien-lun is also known by the English name Nelson Yeh. He was born in Twatutia in 1975. His father is Yeh Chin-sheng, and his mother is Tamako Pan. Yeh's sister is Yeh Tan-ching. Yeh Tien-lun studied film while attending Shih Hsin University, but did not begin his filmmaking career upon graduation, as he felt he could not compare to the work of French New Wave film directors Jean-Luc Godard and François Truffaut, or Ingmar Bergman. Additionally, Yeh's television producer father had incurred a large debt to make a film. Due to these influences, the younger Yeh focused instead on other performance art, including dance and choral singing, as well as voice and stage acting. He appeared with Hugh Lee's Ping-Fong Acting Troupe.

== Filmmaking career ==
Yeh leads the Green Film Production company. Yeh's most successful film is his 2011 directorial debut Night Market Hero, which he developed with the help of his screenwriter sister. That same year, Yeh appeared as an actor in Joe Lee's directorial debut The Spin Kid. In Yeh's second feature film, Twa Tiu Tiann (2014), the protagonist travels back in time to Twatutia in the 1920s. Yeh produced the 2016 film series Metro of Love, which include the film Welcome to the Happy Days directed by Gavin Lin. In 2018, Yeh directed A Taiwanese Tale of Two Cities.

Yeh has participated in panel discussions at the 2012 and 2015 Golden Harvest Awards.
