= Auston Li =

Taiwanese actor (born 2008/2009)

Li Yi-chiao
- 李奕樵
- Born: 2008 or 2009 (age 16–17); Taiwan
- Occupation: Actor
- Years active: 2021-present

Auston Li Yi-chiao (Chinese: 李奕樵; born 2008/2009) is a Taiwanese actor, known for his debut role in The Magician on the Skywalk which earned him Best Newcomer in a Television Series at the 56th Golden Bell Awards.

== Career ==
Li made his acting debut in Yang Ya-che's The Magician on the Skywalk . For this performance, he won the Best Newcomer in a Television Series and received a nomination for Best Male Lead in a Television Series at the 56th Golden Bell Awards. In 2025, Li appeared in The Resurrected, portraying younger version of Fu Meng-po's character.

== Filmography ==
=== Television Series ===
Year	Title	Role	Ref.
2021	The Magician on the Skywalk	Chen Mingsheng ("Xiao Budian")	
2025	The Resurrected	Young Zhang Shikai	

=== Music video appearances ===
Year	Artist	Song title	Ref.
2023	Fire Ex	"Human Condition"	

== Awards and nominations ==
Year	Award	Category	Nominated Work	Result	Ref.
2021	56th Golden Bell Awards	Best Newcomer in Television Series	The Magician on the Skywalk	Won	
2021	56th Golden Bell Awards	Best Male Lead in a Television Series	The Magician on the Skywalk	Nominated	
