= Miss Kicki =

- Directed by: Håkon Liu
- Written by: Alex Haridi
- Produced by: Lizette Jonjic
- Starring: Pernilla August, Ludwig Palmell, Huang He, Eric Tsang
- Distributed by: Migma Film AB; Ocean Deep Films
- Release dates: 4 December 2009 (Taiwan); 5 February 2010 (Sweden)
- Running time: 88 minutes
- Languages: Swedish; English; Chinese; Taiwanese

Miss Kicki is a 2009 Swedish-Taiwanese co-production film. It was Norwegian–Taiwanese director Håkon Liu's first motion picture.

== Plot ==
Kicki (Pernilla August) has, after several years abroad, returned to Sweden. Her 17-year-old son - Viktor (Ludwig Palmell) has been brought up by his grandmother and has a very distant relationship to his mother. In an effort to get reacquainted Kicki invites her son to join her on vacation in Taiwan. But her hidden agenda is that Taipei is also the home of the Taiwanese businessman (Eric Tsang) with whom she has been conducting an Internet romance.

== Cast (in selection) ==
- Pernilla August - Kicki
- Ludwig Palmell - Viktor
- Huang He - Didi
- Eric Tsang - Mr. Chang
- Ken - Receptionist
- Tsai Chen-nan - Police man
- Gwen Yao - Ms. Chang

== Awards ==
Special mention award at Pusan 14th International Film Festival, October 2009 "A perfect example of how “big” a “small” can be. The director's talent shines and portrays multi-national issues, social problems, domestic conflict, friendship and other intricate dilemmas within simple drama. The script, acting and directing are all well composed."

Rainer Werner Fassbinder Prize at Mannheim-Heidelberg, November 2009 "The Rainer-Werner-Fassbinder Prize goes to MISS KICKI by Håkon Liu from Sweden, as it shows us in an exemplary manner, how an actress shapes a film. In ever surprising ways it shows us that cinema does not need many words to express the unsaid and inexpressible in human relationships."

Winner of Telia Film Award at Stockholm International Film Festival, November 2009 "With a subtle, yet precise emotional and visual language, this movie takes us on an inner and outer journey, describing one of the most complex relationships of all - that between a mother and a son. The Telia Film Award goes to Miss Kicki by Håkon Liu"
