= When Love Comes (2010 film) =

- Film poster
- Directed by: Chang Tso-chi
- Written by: Chang Tso-chi
- Produced by: Joseph Liao
- Starring: Lee Yi-Chieh; Kao Meng-Chieh; Lü Hsueh-Feng; Lin Yu-Shun; He Zi-hua
- Cinematography: Chang Chan
- Edited by: Chang Tso-chi
- Music by: Wu Rui-Ran
- Production company: Chang Tso-chi Film Studio
- Distributed by: Swallow Wings Films
- Release date: October 29, 2010 (Taiwan)
- Running time: 108 minutes
- Country: Taiwan
- Language: Taiwanese Mandarin
- Budget: NT$6,660,000

When Love Comes (Chinese title: 當愛來的時候) is a 2010 Taiwanese tragicomic drama film written and directed by Chang Tso-chi (his sixth feature film overall). Unlike Tso-chi's previous works which focused on male subjects, When Love Comes explores the female perspective, with its plot revolving around an underage girl who becomes pregnant before marriage. The film delves into themes of romance, kinship, and personal growth.

When Love Comes was screened at numerous international film festivals, including the BFI London Film Festival as a showcase film, the 10th Kaohsiung Film Festival as the opening film, and the Busan International Film Festival as part of the Masterclass section. It also received fourteen nominations at the 47th Golden Horse Awards, the most of any film at that year's ceremony. The film won in four categories, including Best Narrative Feature, Best Art Direction, Best Cinematography, and the Audience Choice Award.

== Synopsis ==
Set in a suburban seafood restaurant in Taipei, Taiwan, the death of a family member brings forth hidden truths and secrets.

== Plot ==
Dark Face, an alcoholic gambler, marries an infertile woman named Lyu Xuefeng. However, he takes a second lover named Zhihua, and they have a child, Laichun, together. Sharing Dark Face's belief that he must continue on the family name at any cost, Xuefeng accepts Zhihua as Dark Face's second wife and takes Laichun into her family. The family runs a seafood restaurant for a living.

In this environment, Laichun, who dislikes studying and has an on-and-off relationship with her boyfriend Mou Zongfu, experiences a great sense of insecurity. Laichun, feeling the abyss between her and her parents, unknowingly becomes pregnant by Zongfu. On her birthday, Laichun is scolded by Zhihua for chatting about her sex life with her classmates. Later, Laichun takes a pregnancy test and finds out she is pregnant. At a loss, she desperately tries to contact Zongfu, who takes no responsibility and has run away with another woman.

Laichun's accidental pregnancy causes the long-suppressed resentment and dissatisfaction among the family members to finally explode. Upon telling her father of the pregnancy, Dark Face screams at Laichun. Faced with her father's stern reproach, Laichun considers abortion. In a heated argument during a family dinner, Laichun, who has always maintained mixed feelings about her stepmother Xuefeng, harshly wounds her with hurtful words. However, the family is forced to reconsider their ways of living together amidst the tense atmosphere, and Laichun's seemingly unchangeable fate slowly starts to turn towards a positive direction.

When Dark Face passes away after being hospitalized for a sudden illness, Laichun begins to understand her father and her two mothers, and decides with her family to keep the baby.

== Cast ==
- Lee Yi-Chieh as Lu Laichun – A young girl who grew up in a bustling seafood restaurant. Coming from a dysfunctional family, she constantly argues with her father and birth mother.
- Kao Meng-Chieh as Ah-Jie – Laichun's autistic uncle who has a talent for painting. He sometimes takes Laichun for birdwatching.
- Lü Hsueh-Feng as Lyu Xuefeng – Dark Face's first wife. Struggling with infertility, Xuefeng is constantly annoyed by her husband Dark Face's gambling and drinking habits. She eventually takes on the role of the household head more than her own husband.
- Lin Yu-Shun as Dark Face – Laichun's father. Dark Face's outbursts of rage have become his only opportunity to vent his anger.
- He Zi-hua as He Mengting / Zhihua – Dark Face's second wife and Laichun's mother.
- Li Pinyi as Lairi
- Wei Jen-Ching as Grandfather
- Wu Kang-Ren as Mou Zongfu – Laichun's boyfriend.
- Chiu Hsiu-Min as Mou Zongfu's mother – Hsiu-Min had previously won Best Supporting Actress at the Golden Horse Awards for her role in Tso-chi's 1996 film Ah Chung. She made her final on-screen appearance in When Love Comes despite her illness.
- Fan Wing as Mortician
- Tseng Yi-Che as Gangster Tseng Yizhe

== Soundtrack ==
The original soundtrack of When Love Comes was composed by Wu Rui-Ran, a celebrated Taiwanese composer in both Europe and Asia. Wu Rui-Ran is also an accordionist in a tango orchestra and serves as the music director of a theater company. The film's soundtrack, featuring instruments such as piano, strings, and accordion, creates a melancholic atmosphere. Its theme song "The Other Side" was produced by Lin Shang-De, who also wrote the lyrics and music for the song, and was performed by the newcomer actress, Lee Yi-Chieh.

=== Tracklist ===
1. Greyish-Blue Clear Sky (灰藍晴空)
2. Stream Breeze (溪風)
3. Enclosed Room (閉室)
4. Lonesome Humming (孤吟)
5. Rose-Colored Scent (玫瑰色的氣味)
6. Pendulum Swing in the Dark (暗夜鐘擺)
7. Spreading Wings (展翼)
8. The Loneliness of the Silver-Grass Grassland (芒草原的寂寞)
9. Warm Autumn Wind (暖秋風)
10. Wandering in the Valley (漫步山谷)
11. Gliding (飛翔)
12. Eighty-Five Thousand Six Hundred and Thirty-Seven (八萬五千六百三十七)
13. Sun Shower (太陽雨)
14. The Other Side (彼岸)（Lyrics and music written by Lin Shang-De; performed by Lee Yi-Chieh)
15. Rose-Colored Spring (玫瑰色的春天)
16. Flaming Fire (烈焰)

== Themes ==
While focusing on the theme of underage pregnancy, When Love Comes also portrays the complexities and conflicts within a three-generation, lower-middle-class Taiwanese family, intricately capturing the symphony of family dynamics.

For Windows on Worlds, Hayley Scanlon wrote: "A chronicle of displacements, cultural, familial, adolescent, and romantic, When Loves Comes is also in its own way an ode to female solidarity as well as a coming-of-age tale as its feisty young heroine gains the courage to step into herself while preparing for the role of matriarch in accepting her responsibility towards those around her." As a coming-of-age story, the film shows its 16-year-old protagonist discovering the love bestowed upon her and realizing its transformative power for everyone in her family.

When Love Comes explores various forms of dependency. On the one hand, material dependency forces the family to hold onto the seafood restaurant and succumb to the influence of the local gangsters. On the other hand, their emotional dependencies are depicted as both burdensome and supportive. The film delves into the concept of family, emphasizing that family is not only made up of members connected by blood. Instead, it advocates for an alternative notion of family that prioritizes a sense of community, where individuals care for each other without emphasizing degrees of kinship. Within this framework, When Love Comes also examines the theme of motherhood and the diverse expressions it can take. One of the film's most striking aspects is its realistic childbirth scene, where Tso-chi includes a real newborn baby and authentically portrays the process of cutting the umbilical cord.

Writing for Asian Movie Pulse, Teresa Vena noted that, "It is the women who lead the world in this film. They are the makers, they take the decisions for themselves and their families." She also said that women's roles as the heads of their families are deeply and carefully explored.

== Awards ==
Award	Category	Nominee	Result
47th Golden Horse Film Festival and Awards	Best Narrative Feature	When Love Comes	Won
47th Golden Horse Film Festival and Awards	Best Director	Chang Tso-chi	Nominated
47th Golden Horse Film Festival and Awards	Best Supporting Actor	Kao Meng-Chieh	Nominated
47th Golden Horse Film Festival and Awards	Best Supporting Actress	Lü Hsueh-Feng	Nominated
47th Golden Horse Film Festival and Awards	Best New Performer	Lee Yi-Chieh	Nominated
47th Golden Horse Film Festival and Awards	Best Original Screenplay	Chang Tso-chi	Nominated
47th Golden Horse Film Festival and Awards	Best Cinematography	Chang Chan	Won
47th Golden Horse Film Festival and Awards	Best Art Direction	Peng Wei-Min	Won
47th Golden Horse Film Festival and Awards	Best Makeup & Costume Design	Pan Lun-Lin	Nominated
47th Golden Horse Film Festival and Awards	Best Film Editing	Chang Tso-chi	Nominated
47th Golden Horse Film Festival and Awards	Best Sound Effects	Kao Meng-Chieh and Chang Chao-Ming	Nominated
47th Golden Horse Film Festival and Awards	Best Original Film Score	Wu Rui-Ran	Nominated
47th Golden Horse Film Festival and Awards	Best Original Film Song	"The Other Side", with Lyrics and music written by Lin Shang-De and performance by Lee Yi-Chieh	Nominated
47th Golden Horse Film Festival and Awards	Outstanding Taiwanese Filmmaker of the Year	When Love Comes	Nominated
47th Golden Horse Film Festival and Awards	Audience Choice Award	When Love Comes	Won
13th Taipei Film Awards	Best Narrative Feature	When Love Comes	Won
13th Taipei Film Awards	Best Screenplay	Chang Tso-chi	Won
13th Taipei Film Awards	Best Supporting Actress	He Zi-hua	Won
13th Taipei Film Awards	Best New Talent	Lee Yi-Chieh	Won
