= Wake Up (TV series) =

- Traditional Chinese: 麻醉風暴
- Hanyu Pinyin: Mázuì Fēngbào
- Directed by: Aozaru Shiao
- Starring: Jag Huang; Wu Kang-jen; Hsu Wei-ning; Michael Huang
- Country of origin: Taiwan
- Original languages: Mandarin; English; Taiwanese; Hakka
- No. of episodes: 6

Production
- Production location: Taipei, Taiwan
- Production company: Greener Grass Production

Related
- Wake Up 2

Wake Up (Chinese: 麻醉風暴) is a 2015 Taiwanese television series starring Jag Huang, Wu Kang-jen, Hsu Wei-ning and Michael Huang. Filming began on 29 September 2014 and ended on 11 November. The series was aired on PTS HD from 1 April 2015. Wake Up is based on an original novel, Ferocious Pursuit (惡火追緝), by scriptwriter Huang Jian-ming.

Wake Up has earned praises from Hou Wen Yong, an anaesthesiologist and the author of renowned Taiwanese novel The Hospital. The drama won numerous awards at the 50th Golden Bell Awards, including Best Miniseries, Best Directing for a Miniseries, Best Writing for a Miniseries and Best Supporting Actor in a Miniseries for Wu Kang-jen. Leading Hong Kong newsweekly Yazhou Zhoukan placed the drama in the second spot for the 2015 Top Ten Television Dramas, after China's Nirvana in Fire.

Its sequel Wake Up 2 aired on PTS in Taiwan, premiering on September 9, 2017.

== Synopsis ==
When a patient died from a rare anaesthesia complication (malignant hyperthermia) during a medical operation led by the hospital's Chief Physician Chen Hsien Rong (Michael Huang), anaesthesiologist Dr. Hsiao Zheng Xun (Jag Huang) was pressured to take the blame and suspended from duty. However, the insurance agent who handled the death claim, Yeh Jian De (Wu Kang-jen), discovered that there was more to the death cause and teamed up with Hsiao to investigate the situation. The medical operation also reunited Hsiao with his former schoolmate, Song Zhao Ying (Hsieh Ying-xuan) whom reminded Hsiao of his past trauma. A troubled Hsiao then approaches psychiatrist Yang Wei Yu (Hsu Wei-ning) to help him with psychology treatments. Facing pressure from the corrupted hospital system and his past trauma, would Hsiao fight for his conscience or would he give up and conform?

== Cast ==
=== Main cast ===
Cast	Role	Description
Jag Huang	Hsiao Zheng-xun	An ACLS Instructor and an anaesthesiologist who abides strictly to the Good Pharmacy Practice Guideline. Tenacious in doing good and perceived as inflexible, also fears additional responsibility; where he mentioned that anaesthesiologists have no room for mistakes and that he does not want to become the Head of Anaesthesiology. Hsiao is one of the anaesthesiologist in Ren Xin Hospital and is the only anaesthesiologist of the day shift. Due to prolonged work hours and mental stress, he suffers from insomnia and thus treasures his off time. In the second episode, a patient died from a rare anaesthesia complication (Malignant Hyperthermia, MK) during a medical operation and Hsiao was blamed for the accident and suspended from duty due to his prolonged deprivation of sleep and alcoholism. In the fifth episode, he was framed for the murder of Zeng Guo Zhang. In the sixth episode, he was listed as a wanted criminal and helped in the life-saving of the bus accident at Min An Hospital. He takes a long vacation and is staying with psychiatrist Yang Wei Yu at the ending. Hsiao used to be on the basketball team in his junior high school. Both his parents had died and it was mentioned that he was on duty when his mother died.
Hsu Wei-ning	Yang Wei-yu	A psychiatrist who suppresses her own emotions for her profession. In the first episode, she almost bumped into Hsiao, one of her patient, while she was riding. In the third episode, she saw a depressed Hsiao and attempts to help him by getting him to face his past trauma. In the fourth episode, it was revealed that her family from her mother side has a history of depression, hence motivating her to become a psychiatrist. In the fifth episode, she helped to hide Hsiao when he was wanted by the police for the murder of Zeng Guo Zhang. She also mentioned to Hsiao that she faces speech and language impairment, hence she is unable to respond to Hsiao's complaints promptly. Admires Hsiao, and similar to him, likes to listen to Air on the G string in C major while jogging. In the last episode, she stayed by the side of the hospitalised Song Zhao Ying.
Wu Kang-jen	Yeh Jian-de	A 34-years old STS Insurance Company agent who frequents Ren Xin Hospital. In the fifth episode, it was revealed that Yeh was once a physician at Li De Hospital and also a student of Chen Hsien Rong, but was suspended because of an incident where a patient died because of the hospital's refusal to accept him. He is an enthusiastic insurance agent and often promotes insurance plans to La Mi and the other hospital staffs of Ren Xin Hospital. After the death of Madam Zeng, he helps Hsiao in clearing his name, while harbouring his own agenda. In the fourth episode, he exposed Ren Xin Hospital's misdeeds to the media, and also helped Zeng Guo Zhang by explaining the situation to Zeng's creditor. In the fifth person, Hsiao and Yang found out that Yeh was the one who murdered Zeng and Song Zhao Ying and also, framed Hsiao for the doings. It was also revealed that he helped Zeng in devising the insurance fraud, where it was also his revenge back at Chen. In the last episode, Yeh was reminded of the time when he received his junior, also a physician involved in the Li De Hospital embroilment, Lin Hong Ren's suicide note. He helped in the life-saving of the bus accident at Min An Hospital and turned himself into the police at the ending.
Michael Huang	Chen Hsien-rong	The Chief Physician of Ren Xin Hospital, Chen Hsien Rong places the improvement of the hospital as the utmost importance, even to the extent of sacrificing others to achieve his aspiration. A leading expert in the field of Nephrology and also a surgical professor. In the second episode, he sent an already dead Madam Zeng to the ICU to hide the fact of an unsuccessful operation, and also admitted to the cost-cutting of the hospital's expenses which results in the hospital landing into a problematic situation. He confessed to the media and resigned from his duty in the fourth episode. It was revealed in the fifth episode that he was once the Head Surgeon of Li De Hospital, and also caused the Li De incident. He sacrificed his students Yeh Jian De and Lin Hong Ren so that he is able to head abroad for advanced studies. In the last episode, he returned to the first hospital he worked at, Min De Hospital to serve as a physician on the night shift. From the Li De Hospital incident six years ago till present, Chen has committed forgeries of operation reports and medicine expiration, where Yeh finds him already a part of the corrupted hospital system. After the entire incident, Chen is still in the line of duty as a Head Physician in another hospital.

=== Supporting cast ===
Cast	Role	Description
Kerr Hsu	Wang Chen Yu	Wang Chen Yu is Ren Xin Hospital's residing physician. In the first episode, he rushed to ask Hsiao to assist in the anaesthesia of the Councilman's wife during her labour, but was rejected by Hsiao who was handling an urgent case. In the second episode, he explained to Zeng Guo Zhang the death cause of Madam Zeng, but later on revealed to Yeh that the death cause was actually due to use of an expired anaesthetic injection Dantrolene as the hospital was cutting costs.
Wang Tzu-chiang	Wu Tzu-Chiang	Assistant Chief Physician of Ren Xin Hospital, Wu Tzu-Chiang is the Chen Hsien Rong's junior. He often speaks in favour of Chen and has a good relationship with the Councilman. In the third episode, Wu hands in his resignation letter over the Dantrolene incident but was rejected. He then became the Chief Physician in the final episode.
Hsieh Ying-xuan	Song Zhao Ying	Song Zhao Ying is the girlfriend of Zeng Guo Zhang, but was never accepted by Madam Zhang. The medical operation of Madam Zhang reunited her with former schoolmate Hsiao Zheng Xun, hence reminding them both of their traumatic past. In the fifth episode, she was hit on the head by the intruder who murdered Zeng Guo Zhang. In the final episode, her condition worsened but was saved by Wang Chen Yu, and woke up from coma in the finale.
Mario Pu	Zeng Guo Zhang	Zeng Guo Zhang is the boyfriend of Song Zhao Ying. He lost his mother in a failed medical operation, and thus harbours resentment towards Hsiao, who was blamed for the death. He is the client of insurance agent Yeh Jian De. In episode four, Song Zhao Ying discovered that Zeng's grandfather has died from Malignant Hyperthermia and that Zeng had purposefully hid the medical history in an attempt of an insurance fraud. He was murdered in the fifth episode.
Hank Wang	Lin Hong Ren	Lin Hong Ren was a student of Chen Hsien Rong, and has a similar attitude towards saving lives to Hsiao. He took the blame of the Li De Hospital incident. Suffering from the stress of public opinions and the inability to find a new job or get reinstated in duty, he committed suicide at the age of 27.
Esther Yeh	La Mi	Ren Xin Hospital's anaesthetic nurse, also the working partner of Hsiao. Because of the shortage of manpower at the hospital, she has to help out at the nursing station as a receptionist.
Zhou Xin Yu	Song Zhao Ying (Teenage)	A teenage Hsiao was forced to rape her, but he turned berserk and attacked the bullies, thus saving them both. She transferred school immediately after the incident, which caused a trauma in Hsiao.
Wu Kai Wen	Hsiao Zheng Xun (Teenage)	Was forced to rape the teenage Song Zhao Ying, which caused him nightmares ever since. It was revealed that he was the one who informed the school authorities about school bullying, and that he went berserk and attacked the bullies which resulted in him being injured.

=== Guest cast ===
Cast	Role	Description
Hannah Lin	Miss Su	A nurse at Min An Hospital.
	Wu Chang Ching	A patient of operation, who was attended to by Hsiao Zheng Xun
Zhang Jun Min	Vina	A anaesthetic nurse at Ren Xin Hospital, hid the truth about Madam Zeng's operation with her coworkers.
Wu Bi Lian	Zeng Lin Mei Man	Mother of Zeng Guo Zhang, who suffers from kidney stones. Did not want to undergo operation due to the high hospital costs, but the operation was paid for by the STS Insurance Company. She does not trust and thinks that Song Zhao Ying is after the insurance compensation. Died during the operation due to Malignant Hyperthermia.
Liu Yuan Sen		A patient at the Min An Hospital, a victim of the bus accident. Died from loss of blood after thirty minutes of rescuing.
Ma Long	Councilman	Transferred his wife from Ren Xin Hospital after labour as his wife was refused from painless childbirth, and gave the hospital a less than deserving rating. In the second episode, Chen Hsien Rong and Wu Tzu-Chiang apologised to him in person, but he was already in knowing of Madam Zeng's death.
Li Hui Juan	Wife of Councilman	Transferred from Ren Xin Hospital after she was denied painless childbirth.
Patty Lee	Patty	Nurse of Ren Xin Hospital.
Wu Yi Jing	Amy	Nurse of Ren Xin Hospital, told Hsiao Zheng Xun that another doctor was sued too but was unsuccessful.
Lin Xu Yuan	Obstetrician	
Ao Ke Cheng	Secretary of Councilman	
Duan Zheng Ping	Dr Liao	Head of Anaesthesiology at Ren Xin Hospital, superior of Hsiao Zheng Xun, Lami and Vina. Was asked to account for the transfer of the Councilman's wife as Hsiao rejected to give her anaesthesia. Defends Hsiao Zheng Xun after the incident of Madam Zeng, but already knows that the Dantrolene that was used has expired.
	Dr.Luo	A surgeon at Ren Xin Hospital, aided in the operation of Madam Zeng. Pushed the blame of the death of Madam Zeng to Hsiao Zheng Xun with Wu Tzu-Chiang
Lin Mu Jin	PR of Ren Xin Hospital	
Wu Hsin Hsien	Brother Song	Creditor of Zeng Guo Zhang.
Zhang Zhi Jie	Gangster	Subordinate of Brother Song.
	Su Yu Han	Head of surgeon at Bo En Hospital, classmate of Yeh Jian De. Turned Yeh Jian De down when Yeh approaches him for a job.

== Soundtrack ==
Type	Title	Singer	Lyricist	Songwriter
Theme Song	A Million Butterflies	We Save Strawberries (W.S.S.)	Labi Wu	Labi Wu, Chitai Hou, Arny Ing, Hyphen
Background	Air on the G String	-	-	Bach, August Wilhelmj

== Broadcast information ==
Network	Country	Airing Date	Timeslot
PTS HD	Taiwan	April 1, 2015	Mon - Thurs 21:00 - 22:00
TVBS Entertainment Channel	Taiwan	June 15, 2015	Mon - Thurs 20:00 - 21:00
TTV Main Channel	Taiwan	September 25, 2015	Friday 22:00 - 24:00
TITV	Taiwan	September 20, 2016	Tuesday 21:00
FTV	Taiwan	November 19, 2017	Sunday 22:00 - 24:00
Jia Le Channel	Singapore	December 19, 2015	Saturday 21:00 - 22:00
Jia Le Channel	Singapore	August 8, 2015	Saturday 01:00 (aired 6 episodes altogether)
Astro Shuang Xing	Malaysia	December 29, 2017	Monday to Friday 16:00 - 17:00

== Ratings ==
Wake Up received an average rating of 0.39 in the second season of PTS 2015 Television Programs Ratings Report.

== Filming locations ==
=== Taiwan ===
- Taoyuan General Hospital, Ministry of Health and Welfare
- New Taipei City Hospital
- Yilan County Government Police Bureau, Luodong Precinct
- Lanyang Museum
- Taipei Veterans General Hospital Su-Ao Branch
- Saint Mary's Hospital, Luodong
- Lan-Yang Jen-Ai Hospital
- Health Center, Zhuangwei Township, Yilan County
- Health Center, Dongshan Township, Yilan County
- Yilan Wanshan Nursing Home
- Min-Sheng General Hospital, Lung-Tan
- Taiwan National Central Library
- Gloria Jean's Coffee
- Xiao Xiang Ting Japanese Cuisine

== Crew ==
Anaesthesiologist Dr. Huang Ying Zhe was the medical adviser to the film.

- Executive Producer：Ding Shao Qing
- Director: Aozaru Shiao
- Assistant Director: Su Huang Ming
- Assistant to Director: Wang Yu Wen
- Script Supervisor：Zhao Zi Ling
- Project Supervisor：Jiang Feng Rong
- Administration Producer：Fu Kun Min
- Production Assistants: Chang Chih Jie, Wu Hsin Hsien
- Director of Photography：Chen Ko-Chin
- Editor: Gao Ming Cheng, Wang Jing Qiao
- Sound Advisor：Li Ming Jie
- Music Design：MUSDM
- Sound Effects：MUSDM
- Opener and Closing Design：Cheng Wei-Hao
- Assist in Shooting：Yilan County Government Cultural Affairs Bureau
