= Jag Huang =

Jag Huang 黃健瑋
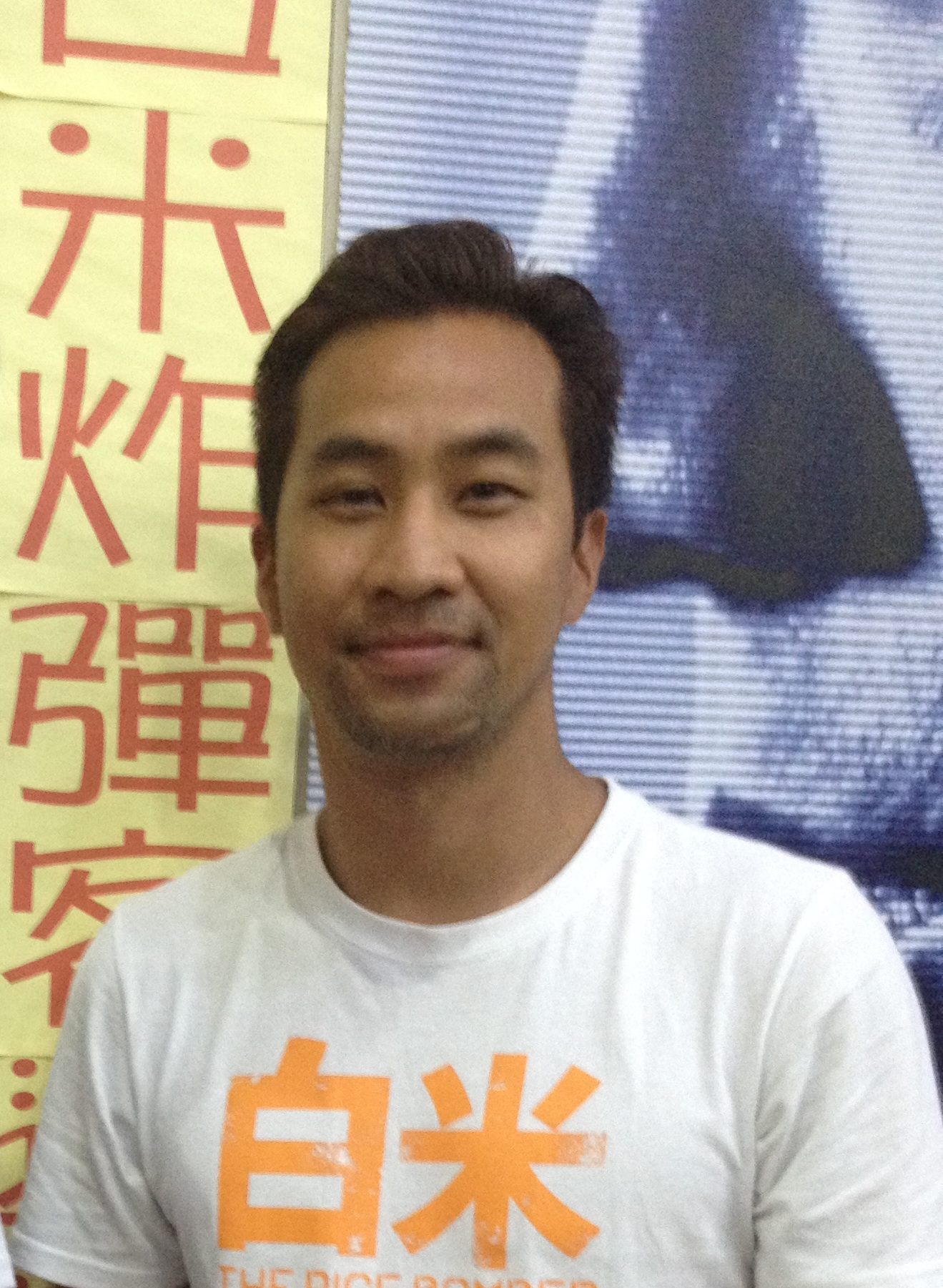
- Huang in 2014
- Born: 13 May 1981 (age 45); Taiwan
- Education: Taipei National University of the Arts
- Occupations: Actor, screenwriter, acting coach
- Years active: 2000—present
- Spouse: Tsai Hsuan-yen (m. 2012)
- Children: 1

Chinese name
- Chinese: 黃健瑋
Transcriptions
Standard Mandarin
- Hanyu Pinyin: Huáng Jiànwěi
Southern Min
- Hokkien POJ: N̂g Kiān-úi
- Musical career
- Also known as: Huang Chien-wei; Huang Jianwei

Jag Huang (Chinese: 黃健瑋; pinyin: Huáng Jiànwěi; Pe̍h-ōe-jī: N̂g Kiān-úi; born 13 May 1981) is a Taiwanese actor, screenwriter and acting coach who began his career in theater. He is known for starring in the television series Wake Up.

== Personal life ==
Huang married actress Tsai Hsuan-yen in 2012. Tsai gave birth to their first child, a girl, in the same year.

== Filmography ==
=== Film ===
Year	English title	Original title	Role	Notes
2001	Two Summers	兩個夏天		Short film
2002	Summer, Dream	石碇的夏天	Hsiao-chih	
2002	Twenty Something Taipei	台北晚九朝五		
2004	My Fair Laddy	我的逍遙學伴	Perv	
2005	The Pain of Others	海巡尖兵	Private	Short film
2005	The Strait Story	南方紀事之浮世光影	Doctor	
2006	Do Over	一年之初	Ding-an	Also acting coach
2006	Silk	詭絲	Bomb Squad B	
2007	Spider Lilies	刺青	Senior investigator B	Also acting coach
2007	Winds of September	九降風	Police officer	Also acting coach
2007	Ransom	贖金		Short film
2008	Love of Ten Thousand Years	愛你一萬年		Short film
2008	God Man Dog	流浪神狗人	Ching Ching's lover	
2008	Tea Fight	鬪茶	A-pao	
2009	Yang Yang	陽陽	Ming-ren	
2010	Crossing the Sentimental Desert	焉知水粉	Chi-shiung	Short film
2010	Tears	眼淚	Red Bean	
2010	Zoom Hunting	獵豔	Detective	
2011	Anti Theft Practice	防盜練習		Short film
2011	Stilnox	舒眠諾斯	Doctor	Short film
2011	Change Your Life	改變你的生活		Short film; Also director, screenwriter and editor
2011	Thief	小偷	Drink stand owner	Short film
2011	10+10	10+10-潛規則	Producer	Segment "Unwritten Rules"
2012	Father's Lullaby	手機裡的眼淚	Cheng Wen-tao	
2012	Life of Pi	—N/a	Sailor	
2012	Take Out the Roots	拔根		Short film; Also director, screenwriter and editor
2012	The Coward	救命		Short film
2013	10pm That Night	那一個晚上10pm	Tu Chen-an	Short film
2013	Soul	失魂	A-chuan's workmate	
2014	The Rice Bomber	白米炸彈客	Yang Ju-men	
2014	Paradise in Service	軍中樂園	Training instructor	
2016	Ace of Sales	銷售奇姬	Sean	
2016	Godspeed	一路順風	Mourner	
2017	The Village of No Return	健忘村	Blue Cloud	
2018	Father to Son	范保德	Fan Pao-te's father	
2019	Sheep Without a Shepherd	誤殺	Cha Peng	
2020	Do You Love Me As I Love You	可不可以，你也剛好喜歡我	Liu Chih-liang	
2020	A Leg	腿	truck driver	
2022	Silence Killing	默殺	Lin Tsai-fu	
2023	Old Fox	老狐狸		
TBA		平安島	Chin Hui	

=== Television ===
Year	English title	Original title	Role	Notes
2003	Banquet	赴宴		
2005	45°C Under the Sky	45°C天空下		
2006	Angel Lover	天使情人		
2006	Bump Off Lover	愛殺17	Inspector Wang	
2008	Police et vous	波麗士大人	Beard	
2009	Black & White	痞子英雄	Wu Yang	
2009	Letter 1949	我在1949，等你	Lao Ma (1949)	
2009	Ranger	歸途	A-kou	Film
2010	The Gifts	女王不下班	Yang Chin-lung	Alternative title: Four Gifts
2010	Because of You	星光下的童話	Chou Tien-li	
2010	Happy Light	幸福微光	Squad leader	
2010	Days We Stared at the Sun	他們在畢業的前一天爆炸	Kuo Yi	
2010	Lazy Eye Years	看見0.04的幸福	Fu Teng-ta (adult)	Film
2011	Innocence	阿戇妹	Yung Tzu	
2011	Soldier	勇士們	Chou Ming-chin	
2013	Falling	含苞欲墜的每一天	Hsu Hao-yuan	
2013	A Doll House	玩偶家庭	Lu Ting-kuo	Film
2013	Shackled	閉鎖鏈	Hsiao-nan's father	Film
2014	Apple in Your Eye	妹妹	San-mi (Chou Kuan-hsiung)	
2015	Dad Was Closed Like a Mountain	爸爸親像山	Chen Yung-shan	
2015	A Touch of Green	一把青	Lieutenant of 9th Brigade	
2015	Wake Up	麻醉風暴	Hsiao Cheng-hsun	
2016	Rock Records in Love – Walk Your Own Way	滾石愛情故事-你走你的路	Hsia Po-feng	
2017	1000 Walls in Dream	夢裡的一千道牆	Jason	
2017	Wake Up 2	麻醉風暴2	Hsiao Cheng-hsun	Also screenwriter
2017	Parking Lot	停車格	A-kan's father	
2019	Without Her, Even Hero Is 0	我是顧家男	Ku Chia-nan	
2021	Seqalu: Formosa 1867	斯卡羅	Liu Ming-teng	
2021	Gold Leaf	茶金	Chin Yuan-kai	
2023	Wave Makers	人選之人—造浪者	Chia-ching Chen	
2023	Port of Lies	八尺門的辯護人	Chiang Ter-jen	

=== Music video appearances ===
Year	Artist	Song title
2007	Tien Hsin	"We Are in Love"
2009	Tanya Chua	"If You See Him"
2010	Rene Liu	"To My Fifteen Year Old Self"
2015	Esther Liu	"Thank of Myself"
2016	William Wei	"Déjà vu"
2016	Ella Chen	"Be Yourself" (Ace of Sales version)
2017	Waa Wei and Ma Di	"Wednesday or Happy Hump Day"

== Theater ==
Year	English title	Original title	Notes
2000	Wild Blue	狂藍	
2001	No Comment	無可奉告	
2002	Alice in Bed	床上的愛麗絲	
2003	God Damn Blue	藍色吧！	
2003	Little Trip to Heaven	魚的通天之旅	Also director
2003	Lu Bu vs Three Brothers	三英戰呂布	Peking opera
2003	Room 118	成人娛樂	
2003	Criminal Talent	犯罪天份	
2004	The Genius	鬼才修劇創之路	
2004	The Cherry Orchard	櫻桃園	
2004	At the Crossroads	三岔口	Peking opera
2004	Shuiliandong	水簾洞	Peking opera
2004	The Spring Metamorphosis	春天的果實在乾掉之後，略顯陌生了	
2004	Staying Focused	越來越難集中精神	
2006	Open the Door, Mister	先生，開個門	
2006	Night Watch	夜巡	Kunqu
2006	The Merchant of Venice	威尼斯商人	
2007	See You in the Air Tomorrow	明天我們空中再見	
2009	Design For Living	華麗上班族之生活與生存	
2009	Crime of The Heart	寂寞芳心俱樂部	
2009	God, Just a Little More Time	神啊！再給我多一點時間！	
2010	People of Thebes	底比斯人	
2011	Bluesy Lee — Welcome to the 70s	李小龍的阿砸一聲	
2014	I Hate Therefore I Marry	恨嫁家族	
2014	What is Sex?	紅樓夢	
2016	For Youth	我記得......	

== Awards and nominations ==
Year	Award	Category	Nominated work	Result
2002	4th Taipei Film Awards	Best New Talent	Summer, Dream	Won
2009	46th Golden Horse Awards	Best Supporting Actor	Yang Yang	Nominated
2012	47th Golden Bell Awards	Best Leading Actor in a Television Series	Innocence	Nominated
2013	48th Golden Bell Awards	Best Leading Actor in a Television Series	Falling	Nominated
2015	50th Golden Bell Awards	Best Actor in a Miniseries or Television Film	Wake Up	Nominated
2015	20th Asian Television Awards	Best Actor	Wake Up	Nominated
2018	53rd Golden Bell Awards	Best Leading Actor in a Television Series	Wake Up 2	Nominated
