= Gold Leaf (TV series) =

Taiwanese television series

- Chinese: 茶金
- Hanyu Pinyin: Chájīn
- Tâi-lô: Tê-kim
- Genre: Period drama
- Based on: Gold Leaf
- Written by: Hsu Yan-ping; Huang Kuo-hua
- Directed by: Lin Chun-yang
- Starring: Cindy Lien; James Wen; Kuo Tzu-chien; Hsu An-chi; Hsueh Shih-ling; Li Hsing; Jag Huang
- Country of origin: Taiwan
- Original languages: Hailu Hakka; Taiwanese Hokkien; Taiwanese Mandarin; Cantonese; Shanghainese; English; Japanese; French
- No. of seasons: 1
- No. of episodes: 12

Production
- Producers: Hsu Ching-yun; Tang Sheng-rong; Luo Yi-chiao
- Cinematography: Chien You-tao
- Production companies: Taiwan Public Television Service; Hancao Film and Television; Hakka Affairs Council

Original release
- Network: Public Television Service
- Release: 13 November 2021 – present

Gold Leaf (Chinese: 茶金) is a 2021 Taiwanese period drama based on the eponymous novel written by Huang Kuo-hua. Set in the 1950s, Gold Leaf is Taiwan's first Hailu Hakka language drama.

Directed by Lin Chun-yang, the series stars Cindy Lien, James Wen, Kuo Tzu-chien, Hsu An-chi, Hsueh Shih-ling, Li Hsing, and Jag Huang.

It received 16 nominations at the 57th Golden Bell Awards and went on to win the Best Supporting Actress in a Television Series (Sophia Li) and the Best Editing for a Drama Series.

== Synopsis ==
Gold Leaf depicts the doomed tea trade in Taiwan during the 1950s, following the travails of Shang Chi-hsin and her family owned tea exporting company.

== Cast ==
=== Principals ===
- Cindy Lien as Chang Yi-hsin
- James Wen as Liu Kun-kai
- Kuo Tzu-chien as Chang Fu-chi
- Hsu An-chi as Luo Shan-mei ('Mountain Girl')
- Hsueh Shih-ling as Fan Wen-gui
- Sophia Li (Tw) as Hsia Mu-hsueh
- Jag Huang as Chin Yuan-kai

=== Supporting Cast ===
- Aaron Don Don as the Driver
- A T Beaune as David

== Controversy ==
The drama drew controversy for misrepresenting the creation of the New Taiwan dollar (NTD), by incorrectly depicting a scene in which American advisors recommended that Taiwanese officials adopt the NTD to address hyper-inflation in the country, when in reality, the Kuomintang-led government adopted the currency of their own volition. The drama's production team issued a joint statement for misrepresenting these historical facts.
