= River Huang =

Taiwanese actor

- 黃河
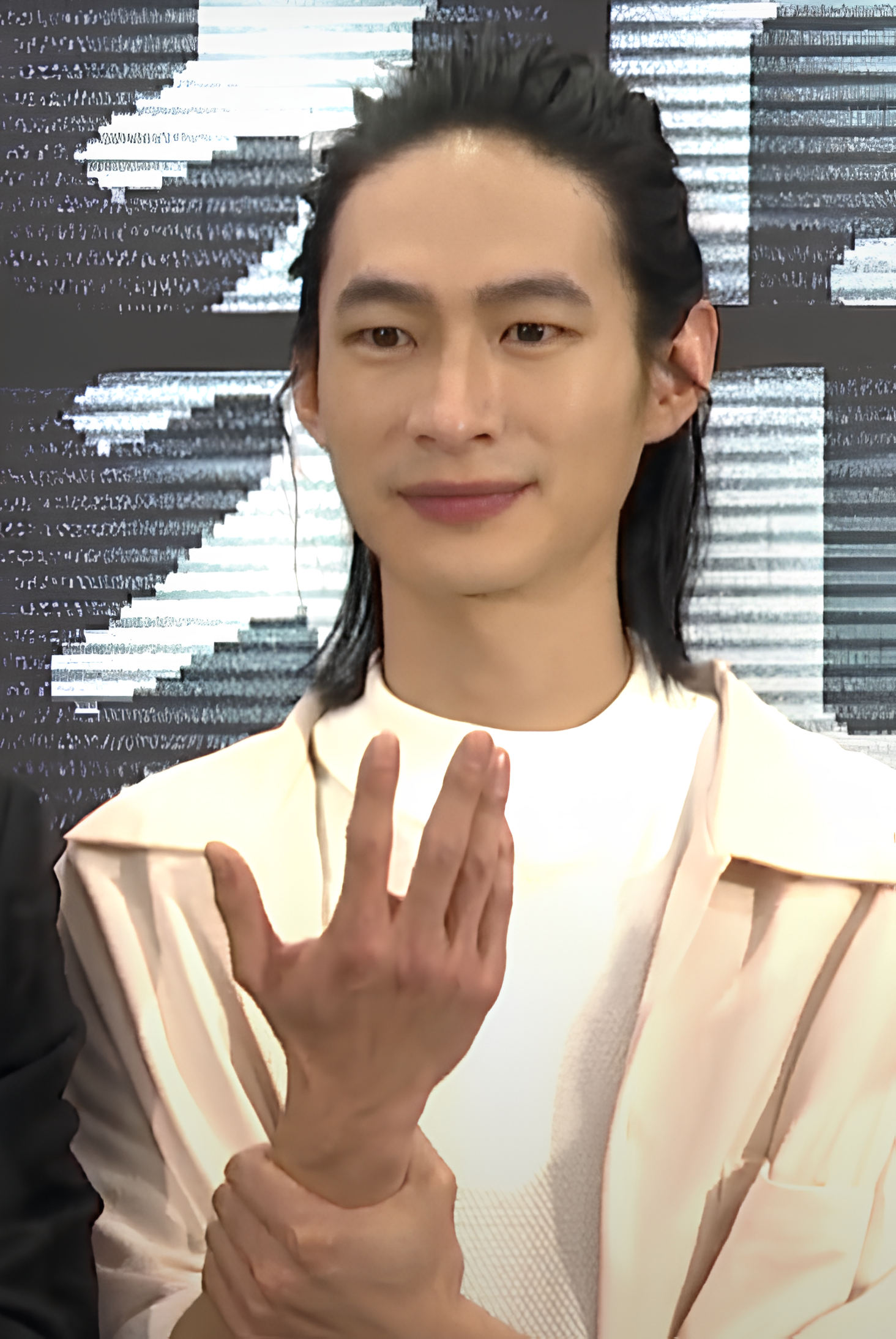
- Huang in 2023
- Born: November 13, 1989 (age 36); Singapore
- Education: National Taiwan University of Arts
- Years active: 2006-present
- Musical career
- Also known as: Huang He; Huang Ho

River Huang (Chinese: 黃河; Pe̍h-ōe-jī: N̂g Hô; born November 13, 1989) is a Taiwanese actor. He is the first actor signed by the director Yee Chin-yen. At age 18, Huang won the Best Actor award at the Golden Bell Awards for his debut role in Dangerous Mind, making him the youngest actor to win in that category. In 2009, he starred in Swedish-Taiwanese film Miss Kicki. And in 2010, he starred in Juliets, a Taiwanese film inspired by William Shakespeare's tragic love story Romeo and Juliet.

== Filmography ==
=== Film ===
Year	English title	Original title	Role	Notes
2009	Miss Kicki	霓虹心	Didi	
2010	Juliets	茱麗葉	Hsiao-lo	"Two Juliets"
2010	The Pieces	小情小愛		Short film
2011	War Game 229	燃燒吧！歐吉桑	Hsiao-wu	
2011	10+10	—N/a	Young Man in Park	Short film, segment "Green Island Serenade"
2012	Cathy No.5	凱西五號		Short film
2012	The Ghost Tales	變羊記	A-chuan	
2013	Trust City	信任心城市		Short film
2014	My Mandala	原來你還在	Kuo Yin	
2014	Meeting Dr. Sun	行動代號：孫中山	Man in metro	alternative title: Salute! Sun Yat-Sen
2015	Southern Wind	南風	Yu	alternative title: Riding the Breeze
2015	The Tag-Along	紅衣小女孩	Ho Chih-wei	
2017	The Tag-Along 2	紅衣小女孩2	Ho Chih-wei	
2018	Tracey	翠丝		
2018	The Devil Fish			

=== Television series ===
Year	English title	Original title	Role	Notes
2006	Dangerous Mind	危險心靈	Hsieh Cheng-chieh	
2008	Wish to See You Again	這裡發現愛	Seventeen-year-old Hsu Le	
2010	Momo Love	桃花小妹	Young Chen Chi	
2011	Light Garden	莒光園地		
2012	Finding Anthony	公視人生劇展- 公主與王子	Kuan-tzu / Chen Kuan-Chih	
2014	Cigarette Ends	菸蒂	A-ta	Film
2014	Boysitter	俏摩女搶頭婚	Hao Chien-jen	
2015	Be With Me	舞吧舞吧在一起	Chiang Tse-hsuan	
2017	1000 Walls in Dream	夢裡的一千道牆	Shen Chi-kuang	
2019	From Beijing to Moscow	北京到莫斯科	Kaixiang	Toggle original series
2020	Futmalls.com	預支未來	Liu Xiang Da	
2020	The Victims' Game	誰是被害者	Chen Ya-huo	Netflix original
2023	Copycat Killer	模仿犯	Tien Chun-I	Netflix original

=== Music video ===
Year	Artist	Song title
2006	Queenie Lin	"I Dream Of"
2007	Paul Wong	"Seasons"
2014	Roger Yang	"Lonely Lovers"
2014	Shi Shi	"Live With You"
2021	Accusefive	"Fool's Paradise"

== Discography ==
=== Soundtrack album ===
Title	Album details	Track listing
Dangerous Mind OST 危險心靈電視原聲帶	Released: September 1, 2006; Label: Magnum Music; Formats: CD, digital download	Track listing: 1. 教室環遊

== Awards and nominations ==
Year	Award	Category	Nominated work	Result
2007	42nd Golden Bell Awards	Best Actor	Dangerous Mind	Won
2012	47th Golden Bell Awards	Best Actor in a Miniseries or Television Film	Finding Anthony	Nominated
2014	49th Golden Bell Awards	Best Actor in a Miniseries or Television Film	Cigarette Ends	Nominated
2014	1st Youth Film Festival	Best Performer(Jury Award)	My Mandala	Won
2016	18th Taipei Film Festival	Best Actor	The Tag-Along	Won
2019	13th Asian Film Awards	Best Supporting Actor	Tracey	Nominated
2019	2nd Asian Academy Creative Awards	Best Leading Actor	From Beijing to Moscow	Won
2023	58th Golden Bell Awards	Best Supporting Actor in a Miniseries or Television Film	The Leaking Bookstore	Nominated
