= Lung Shao-hua =

Taiwanese actor (1953–2021)

- 龍劭華
- Born: Chen Kun-chang (陳坤倉); 25 March 1953; Taichung County, Taiwan
- Died: 14 September 2021 (aged 68); 85 Sky Tower, Kaohsiung, Taiwan
- Occupations: Actor; singer; television host
- Years active: 1986–2021
- Spouses: Pai Hung (m. 1977; div. 1978) Hsieh Hsueh-chen (m. 1995)
- Children: 2 (including actor Chen Wei-zuo)
- Musical career
- Also known as: Long Shaohua

Lung Shao-hua (Chinese: 龍劭華; pinyin: Lóng Shàohuá; Pe̍h-ōe-jī: Lêng Siāu-hôa; 25 March 1953 – 14 September 2021) was a Taiwanese actor, singer and television host.

Lung was found unresponsive in Kaohsiung on 14 September 2021 by the film crew he was working with, and declared dead after arriving at Yuan's General Hospital.

== Filmography ==
=== Television series ===
Year	English title	Original title	Role	Notes
1986	Auspicious Beginning	開張大吉	A-pieh	
1987	Laughter of the Red Roof House	紅瓦屋笑聲		
1987	Shenyi Hua Tuo	神醫華佗		
1988	The One I Yearn For	思慕的人	A-pin	
1991	Career Master	草地狀元	Jen-te	
1992	Xiamen Bride	廈門新娘	Lin Ming-tang	
1993	Qiu Wang She Yu Bai Zei Qi	邱罔舍與白賊七		
1994	Qian Shou Chu Tou Tian	牽手出頭天	Chen Wan-chin	
1995	The Taiwan Folklore	臺灣水滸傳	Lin Tien-ting	
1995	Love in Other Lands	愛在他鄉		
1995	Jin Ye Zuo Meng Ye Hui Xiao	今夜作夢也會笑	Huang Cha-mou / Huang Li-chun	
1996	Taiwan History	臺灣演義	Chiu Tzu-she	
1996	Heaven Loves Good Men	天公疼好人	Lung Chia-pao	
1996	Affinity	大家有緣	Chu-tou	
1997	Taiwan Independence Members	台獨份子	Kuo-hsiung	
1997	Big Sister in Charge	大姐當家	Liu Tien-tsai	
1997	Gemini	星座女人系列之雙子座		
1998	Qian Jin Xi Fu Wan Jin Sun	千金媳婦萬金孫	Wu Chia-wen	
2000	Ah Bian and Ah Jane	阿扁與阿珍	Chen Chao-chin	
2000	Women Walk	女生向前走	Yung-kang	
2000	Wish You Happiness	祝你幸福	Yang Te-chuan	
2000	Fei Lung	飛龍在天	Hui-niang's father	
2001	Beigang Burner	北港香爐		
2002	Negative Line of Tears	負君千行淚	Kan Lu-sung	
2002	Good Luck to Me	好運今年輪到我		
2003	The Young Shi Yanwen	少年史艷文		
2003	Jun Chen Qing Shen	君臣情深	Eunuch	Cameo
2003	Beauty 99	愛情風暴美麗99	Ho Chih-yuan	
2004	The Luckiest Man	天下無雙		
2005	Memories of an Old Love	舊情綿綿	Wang Pang-hsiung	
2006	Everlasting	天長地久		
2006	The Spirits of Love	愛	Wang Chin-lung	
2007	Ji Gong	濟公	Ji Gong	
2008	The Sandwich Man	三明治先生	Chou Wan-tsai	
2009	Kaifeng Bao Qing Tian	開封有個包青天	Lung Tsai-tien	
2010	Roadside CEO	路邊董事長	Lin Yung-hsiang	
2011	Way Back into Love	愛。回來	Yang Si-yuan	
2012	Gentle Mercy	溫柔的慈悲	Fan Yung-kang	
2012	Ti Amo Chocolate	愛上巧克力	Cocoa master	Cameo
2012	The Other Hands	牽手	Hsiao Pa-tien	Alternative title: Wives
2012	Home	回家	Su Ching-kuei	
2013	The Heart of Woman	天下女人心	Hsu Yung-yeh	
2013	Laba Hong's Melody	喇叭宏的悲喜曲	Laba Hong	
2013	Flavor of Life	含笑食堂	Liu Kuei-te	
2013	Ordinary Love	世間情	Ke Chi-pa	
2014	In a Good Way	我的自由年代	Chang Chia-lin	
2014	Our Mother	阿母	Hsu	Cameo
2015	Aim High	22K夢想高飛	Jen Chi-liang	
2015	Life of Pearl	珍珠人生	Chi Yao-lin	
2015	The Taste of Dang-Liang's Family	黨良家之味	Wu Dang-liang	
2015	Love Cuisine	料理高校生	Old man	Cameo
2016	Nie Xiaoqian	聶小倩	Lin	
2016	La Grande Chaumière Violette	紫色大稻埕	Tsai Hsueh-hsi	
2016	Refresh Man	後菜鳥的燦爛時代	Wang Chao-lung	Cameo
2016	High 5 Basketball	High 5 制霸青春	Chiu Te-chi	
2016	All in 700	700歲旅程	Li Te-lang	
2017	The Masked Lover	我的愛情不平凡	Jung Fu-hsiung	
2017	The Perfect Match	極品絕配	Jung Fu-hsiung	Cameo
2017	A Boy Named Flora A	植劇場-花甲男孩轉大人	Cheng Kuang-huang	
2017	Taste of Life	甘味人生	King	
2017	Love River	春風愛河邊		

=== Film ===
Year	English title	Original title	Role	Notes
1980	One Wife is Good Enough	一個太太恰恰好		
1980	The Frogman	大地勇士		
1980	The Story of A-Lan	阿蘭的故事		
1981	The Flute Player of Wrath	血雨鴛鴦奪魂笛		
1981	The Way to Stardom	我是大明星		
1982	All the Corl One's Men	百分滿點		
1982	Escape to Freedom	黑獄大逃亡		
1982	The Assault on Virgin Island	突擊處女島		
1983	Temptation	誘惑		
1983	Forbidden Fruit	莫偷嘗禁果		
1983	Who Knows About Me	江湖我獨行		
1983	The Fishing Adventure	討海的人		
1983	Zhi Fen Ying Han	脂粉硬漢		
1985	The Win	中獎		
1987	Lang Zi Yu Wu Nu	浪子與舞女		
1988	High Noon Passion	情鎖高危日		
1988	Lady and Wicked Man	淑女惡男		
1988	King of Kings	騙王之王		
1989	He Is My Brother	海口人		
1989	Xiao Xiao Mian Dang Bing	小小免當兵		
1989	00.99 Da Fa Cai	00.99大發財	Lottery store boss	Cameo
1990	Ye Ying Tu Ji	野鶯突擊		
1990	Pi Li Nu Jiao Wa	霹靂女嬌娃		
1991	The Dignified Killers	至尊殺手		
1991	Retreat of the Godfather	大哥讓位		
1998	Sheng Goes to Taiwan	周成過台灣		
1999	March of Happiness	天馬茶房	Sea Dragon	
2000	Pan Ke Yu Lei Gu	叛客與雷鬼		
2011	Jump Ashin!	翻滚吧！阿信	Pine	
2012	Love	愛	Mr. Li	
2013	Forever Love	阿嬤的夢中情人	Old Liu Chi-sheng	
2013	As the Winds Blow	戀戀海灣		
2014	Elena	愛琳娜	Chen You-yi	
2015	When Miracle Meets Maths	愛情算不算	Grandfather	
2016	10,000 Miles	一萬公里的約定	Father	
2016	7 Seconds in a Life Time	直線七秒		Television
2017	The Tag-Along 2	紅衣小女孩2	Master Long	
2017	Father to Son	在一個死亡之後	A-hou	

=== Variety show ===
Network	English title	Original title	Notes
CTV	You and Me	綜藝我和你	Host
CTV	Guess	我猜我猜我猜猜猜	Host
Taiwan Arts & Culture Television	Taiwan Much Dian Chang Xiu	台灣MUCH點唱秀	Host

== Discography ==
=== Studio albums ===
Title	Album details	Track listing
Alone 孤單	Released: 1996; Label: Blue & White Company; Formats: CD	Track listing: 1. 孤單; 2. 心內的話; 3. 隨人著保重; 4. 好漢; 5. 黃昏的故鄉; 6. 不倘乎愛變成一種罪; 7. 江湖浪子不是阮的名; 8. 媽媽請你也保重; 9. 月娘半邊圓; 10. 心內的話一演奏版

== Published works ==
- Lung, Shao-hua (2005). Xi Tai Shang De Lang Zi - Long Shao Hua De Jing Cai Ren Sheng. Taipei: Global Publishing Group. ISBN 9867323920.

== Awards and nominations ==
Year	Award	Category	Nominated work	Result
1997	32nd Golden Bell Awards	Best Actor in a Television Series	March of Happiness	Nominated
1999	36th Golden Horse Awards	Best Supporting Actor	The Taiwan Folklore	Nominated
2001	36th Golden Bell Awards	Best Actor in a Television Series	Beigang Burner	Nominated
2011	46th Golden Bell Awards	Best Actor in a Television Series	Roadside CEO	Nominated
2012	47th Golden Bell Awards	Best Actor in a Television Series	Way Back into Love	Nominated
2013	48th Golden Bell Awards	Best Actor in a Television Series	Flavor of Life	Nominated
2013	48th Golden Bell Awards	Best Actor in a Miniseries or Television Film	Laba Hong's Melody	Won
2016	21st Asian Television Awards	Best Actor in a Leading Role	The Taste of Dang-Liang's Family	Won
2019	54th Golden Bell Awards	Best Leading Actor in a Television Series	A Taste to Remember	Won
