= From Beijing to Moscow =

- 北京到莫斯科
- Genre: Romance-mystery
- Created by: Wai Thong 周伟堂
- Written by: Wai Thong 周伟堂; Link Sng 孙逸群
- Directed by: Sam Loh 罗胜
- Starring: River Huang; Jojo Goh; Felicia Chin; Aloysius Pang
- Country of origin: Singapore
- Original language: Mandarin
- No. of episodes: 13

Production
- Producer: Wai Thong 伟堂
- Production locations: China; Mongolia; Russia

Original release
- Network: Toggle
- Release: 13 June – 25 July 2019

From Beijing to Moscow (Chinese: 北京到莫斯科) is an original Toggle 13-episode romance-mystery series starring River Huang, Jojo Goh, Felicia Chin and Aloysius Pang. It premiered on 13 June 2019 on Toggle. This was Aloysius Pang's last drama before his death on 23 January that year.

== Plot ==
Kaixiang (River Huang) lost his memory after an accident.

== Cast ==
- River Huang as Kaixiang
- Jojo Goh as Xiaoqi
- Felicia Chin as Kloudiia
- Aloysius Pang as Kenneth

== Awards and nominations ==
=== Asian Academy Creative Awards ===
Asian Academy Creative Awards – Acting Awards
Category	Nominees	Result
Best Actor	River Huang	Won
Best Actress	Jojo Goh	Won
Best Sound	—N/a	Won
Best Theme Song	—N/a	Won
Best Drama	—N/a	Won

=== Star Awards 2021 ===
Star Awards – Acting Awards
Accolades	Category	Nominees	Result
Star Awards 2021 Awards Ceremony 红星大奖2021颁奖礼	Best Short-Form Drama Series	From Beijing to Moscow	Won

== Production ==
From Beijing to Moscow was shot in a two-month road trip to China, Mongolia and Russia from August to October 2018.
