= Lee Yi-chieh =

Taiwanese actress

- 李亦捷
- Born: 1992 (age 33–34); Taiwan
- Occupation: Actress
- Years active: 2010–present
- Notable work: When Love Comes (2010); Wild Sparrow (2019)

Lee Yi-chieh (Chinese: 李亦捷; born 1992) is a Taiwanese actress who shared the Best Actress Award at the Taipei Film Awards in 2019 for her performance in Wild Sparrow (2019). In that movie Lee portrayed a young woman that struggles with romantic relationships and her job while raising her son. She also won the best new actor awards at both the Taipei Film Festival and Chinese Film Media Awards in 2011 for her performance in When Love Comes (2010).

== Filmography ==
Year	English title	Original title	Role
2010	When Love Comes	當愛來的時候	Lu Lai-chun
2012	The Ghost Tales	變羊記	Chi
2013	Forever Love	阿嬤的夢中情人	Xiao Jie
2017	Tshiong	衝組	Hsiao Han
2018	The Silence Of OM	憨嘉	Yang Ching-chuan
2018	Killed by Rock and Roll	搖滾樂殺人事件	LULU
2019	When Green Turns to Gold	最是橙黃橘綠時	Hsi Min
2019	Wild Sparrow	野雀之詩	A Li
2021	Come Rain or Come Shine	雨天的妖怪	Tsai Hsing-yen
