= Dangerous Mind =

2006 Taiwanese television series

- Created by: Hou Wen Yun
- Developed by: Blue Productions
- Directed by: Yee Chin-yen
- Starring: River Huang; Guang Yun; Lee Lieh; Jack Kao; Cai Can-De; James Wen; Gwei Lun-mei; Lan Cheng-lung; Guo Shi-Lun; Bryan Chang; Ji Pei-Hui; Hu Huan-Wei; Deng Sheng-Yao
- Country of origin: Taiwan
- No. of episodes: 30

Production
- Executive producers: Hong Guo-Zhi; Guo Zhi-Lian; Lin Mu-Fan; Zhang Zhi-Wei
- Camera setup: Chen Da Pu
- Running time: approx. 48 minutes

Original release
- Network: PTS
- Release: June 26 – August 4, 2006

Dangerous Mind (Chinese: 危險心靈; pinyin: Wéi Xǐan Xīn Líng) is a 2006 Taiwanese television series starring River Huang, Guang Yun, Lee Lieh, Jack Kao, Cai Can-De and James Wen. It is adapted from the novel of the same name by Taiwanese writer Hou Wen Yung. The series focuses on the conflicts among teachers, students, and the parents during the Taiwanese educational reform from the students' aspects.

In 2007, River Huang won Best Actor and Dangerous Mind was awarded Best Television Series at the 42nd Golden Bell Awards, Taiwan.

== Plot summary ==
Xie Zheng-Jie (Jay) is a senior in Taipei Municipal Li Ren Junior High School. He has to take the national senior high school entrance exams in the near future. One day, a school inspector from Taipei Education Bureau abruptly goes to Li Ren and tells them that there is a report on Mr. Zhan, a math teacher in Li Ren Junior High, who uses the music class period to give students math exams. After hearing this, Mr. Zhan is very angry. Later, he finds out that those letters were sent by Shen Wei, a student in his class. Hence, Shen Wei is forced to transfer to another class. After Jay refuses to participate in Mr. Zhan's cram school, he is forced by Mr. Zhan to move his desk to the hallway outside and participate in the class from the hallway all day long because he reads comic books during class. Mr. Zhan calls Jay's mother, wanting her to come to school and deal with the problem, but he humiliates Jay's mother in front of Jay. Jay loses his temper and shoves Mr. Zhan, which causes a small physical altercation between the two. The school gives Jay a harsh warning, which is comparable to a three-strikes-you're-out type of punishment. Jay and his mother disagree on the warning and this leads to a conflict between Jay's family and the school. At the same time, Jay's parents face a divorce. Jay is also given the elbow by other students. All of these consecutive incidents cause Jay to think of the real meaning in his daily routine - taking tests, going to cram school, studying hard, and what he really needs in his future life.

== Cast ==
- Xie Zheng-Jie (Jay), played by River Huang: The protagonist in the story, a fifteen-year-old boy in ninth grade. He used to get good grades and study hard. He is also considered to be a witty student in school. But after meeting Shen Wei, Eileen, and Gao Wei Qi, there are a lot of incidents in his life make him think about the future he wants to have.
- Zhang Xin-Ru, played by Zhi Pei-Huei: A schoolmate of Jay, and also the girl Jay has a crush on. She has a good feeling toward Jay, too.
- Shen Wei, played by Bryan Chang: He used to be Jay's classmate, but he is forced to transfer to another class due to the "blackmail" incident. He is diagnosed with a brain tumor. He has the spirit of revolution which makes him positively fight against the authorities and query various systems and unreasonable phenomena.
- Gao Wei-Qi, played by Hu Huan-Wei: A troublemaker and rebel in Li Ren Junior High. He was cultivated into a rebel because of a bad domestic atmosphere.
- Zhao Ru-Hao, played by Deng Sheng-Yao: A classmate and good friend of Jay. He is always a goody-goody with perfect grades. He is not an ambitious boy and just wants to enter Jian Guo High School and a good university. His relationship with Jay has been challenged after the conflict between Jay and Mr. Zhan.
- Zhang De-Cai, played by Guan Yun: A dean in Li Ren Junior High School and also the father of Zhang Xin Ru. No matter what happens, he only wants to retain the prestige of the school and deal with the problems as quickly as possible.
- Zhang Mei-Li, played by Lee Lieh: Jay's mother. She is an editor working in Taipei News Daily, and she is in a marital crisis.
- Xie Xian-Tang, played by Jack Kao: Jay's father. He cannot stand the aggressive attitude of his wife Zhang Mei Li, therefore the marriage is likely to break.
- Zhan Chao-Wei (Mr. Zhan), played by James Wen: The ace among the math teachers in Li Ren, a strict math teacher who is supported by many parents of the students. After he has a conflict against Jay, he only want to assure his benefits and the status quo in the school; therefore he unscrupulously goes on the attack against Jay.
- Peng Qi-Wen (Ms. Peng), played by Tsai Tsan-te: An English teacher in Li Ren Junior High School. Her teaching ideas are in total contrast to Mr. Zhan's and she treats her students in a very friendly way.
- Eileen, played by Gwei Lun-mei: An eighteen-year-old dropout who makes a living by selling drugs and being a prostitute. She often has a "don't care" attitude toward others when she actually feels lonely.
- Lawrence, played by Lan Cheng-lung: Eileen's boyfriend. He is very skillful at computers and the Internet. He sometimes uses his talent to be a hacker and helps out Jay.
- Professor Hao, played by Xie Li-Jing: An educationist who is unsatisfied with the educational system today in Taiwan. She often participates in call-in talk shows and preaches about her ideas of educational reform.
- Qiu Xian, played by Guo Shi-Lun: Jay's mother's colleague who is also an editor in Taipei News Daily. He likes Jay's mother and also supports the protest held by Jay's family.

== Differences between the novel and the series ==
- In the novel, Zhan Chao-Wei has been teaching for 20 years, while in the series, he is much younger.
- When Zhan Chao-Wei is at university in the TV series, he has a record of rioting. This does not occur in the novel.
- In the series drama, Zhan Chao-Wei finally joins Xie Zheng-Jie in rioting, and gets married with Peng Qi-Wen. In the novel, he resigns.
- In the novel, the riot was at the Ministry of Education's door, and it is hardly quashed by the police. In the series, the riot occurs outside Li Ren's gate.
- In the novel, Shen Wei sings a song and kills himself, but in the series, his life is spared.
- Zhang Xin-Ru is a fictional character who appears in the series.

== Music ==
- OP: I dream of (我希望)
  - Songwriting: Wang Chiyao, Hou Chihchien
  - Singer: Lin Kuanyin
- ED: Ode to Joy
  - Original: Beethoven
  - Songwriting: Hou Chihchien
  - Singer: O.Jay
- Interlude: 教室環遊
  - Songwriting: Wang Chiyao, Hou Chihchien
  - Singer: River Huang, Hu Huan Wei, Deng Sheng Yao, Zhuang Hsiangwei

== Awards ==
Year	Ceremony	Category	Result
2007	42nd Golden Bell Awards	Best Television series	Won
2007	42nd Golden Bell Awards	Best Actor - River Huang	Won
