= Wake Up 2 =

2017 Taiwanese television series

- Original title: 麻醉風暴2
- Genre: Medical; Drama
- Written by: Wang Hui-chu; Yang Wan-ju; Lin Ken-wei; Aozaru Shiao; Huang Yu-chia; Chen Cheng-yu; Jag Huang
- Directed by: Aozaru Shiao; Hung Po-hao; Lin Chih-ju
- Starring: Jag Huang; Hsu Wei-ning; Lego Lee; Summer Meng; Wu Kang-jen
- Theme music composer: No Party For Cao Dong
- Opening theme: Mud
- Ending theme: Never Give Up
- Composers: Rockid Lee; Yu Chia-luen
- Country of origin: Taiwan
- Original languages: Mandarin; English; Arabic; Taiwanese; Hakka
- No. of episodes: 13

Production
- Producers: Hank Tseng; Phil Tang
- Production locations: Taipei, Taiwan, Kaoshiung, Tainan, Taoyuan, Jordan
- Running time: 50 minutes
- Production companies: Greener Grass Production; PTS

Original release
- Release: September 9 – October 28, 2017

Related
- Wake Up

Wake Up 2 (Chinese: 麻醉風暴2) is a 2017 Taiwanese television series and sequel to Wake Up, with the story set 5 years after the prequel, starring the original cast with the addition of Lego Lee and Summer Meng. This is also Lee and Meng's third collaboration after 2013 film 27°C - Loaf Rocks and 2014 television series Aim High. Wake Up 2 is the first Taiwanese television series to film in a Middle Eastern country, where filming took place in refugee camps in the Northern Borders Region of the Jordan River and Syria, to depict the selflessness and heroism of humanitarian rescue. The main storylines involve the humanitarian rescue in Middle East, a subway bombing incident in Kaohsiung (filmed in Taoyuan HSR station), the continuation of Human Meatball Controversy from series one, and the restructuring of National Public Healthcare in 2016. Wake Up 2's tag-line is "Never Give Up", which serves not only as a line of encouragement, but also as a question on when they should or have to give up (e.g. abandon operation, stop resuscitation to a deceased patient, etc.)

With a total of thirteen episodes, Wake Up 2's production budget was five times more than the first installment in the series, up to NT$60 million, with majority of the budget spent on hiring cameos, medical consultants and making false cadavers from animal innards. Filming in Taiwan began on August 19, 2016, in Kaohsiung and ended on January 17, 2017, in Taipei. The crew then headed for Jordan to film the war scenes as Jordan is relatively safer than Syria. Filming was completed on February 14, 2017, and entered post production for another 6 to 7 months before release.

At the end of each episode, Before Waking Up, Outside the Storm is a mini aftershow which shows behind-the-scenes interviews. Similar to Wake Up, each week in the premiere is shown in two episodes, with the final episode being a single finale plus a one-hour feature length behind-the-scenes episode, where the entire makings of most props and logics behind the storylines are revealed. The show did not air on week of September 30 for the live broadcast of the 52nd Golden Bell Awards.

Following the release of Wake Up 2, the creative team decided not to move forward with a third season onward, as they thought 2 had a perfect ending that wrapped up the story. Despite there were talks/ideas of a potential continuation during writing stages, producers have noted this would be up to the decision for the studios to make the decision.

== Cast ==
=== Main ===
Cast	Role	Description
Jag Huang	Hsiao Cheng-hsun	41, Former anaesthesiologist of Ren Xin Hospital, became a Doctors Without Borders member in Jordan 5 years later (2016), he also learnt surgical skills in Jordan, Yeman and Sudan. He initially was to continue working in Switzerland, but was forced to return to Taiwan after the hospital he worked in was bombed. He also was involved in subway explosion case when he returns to Taiwan, so he was recruited by Kang Lian Hospital as Head of Trauma Unit because he was also an ACLS instructor, but was mainly used as an anaesthetist. Has post-traumatic stress disorder, but it was because of Yang Wei-yu's miscarriage. He kept a goatee after returning to Taiwan as it was a Middle-Eastern custom. Using his prior knowledge and experience, he slowly regained his self-worth and value. He was medically stood down due to the blood bruise in his basal ganglia (traumatic basal ganglial haematoma) after the Jordanian bombing doubled in size from when he was in Switzerland. When he had the craniotomy to remove the haematoma, he could no longer breathe and maintain a heart rate unassisted, and was diagnosed as brain dead hours later, and his organs were donated as per his wishes. After he died, the Trauma Unit fell apart with him due to system reform.
Hsu Wei-ning	Yang Wei-yu	Former psychiatrist and psychologist. She became a vice-CEO of Kang Lian hospital. Also the founder of Trauma Unit. Has speech and language impairments, so she cannot respond verbally in time. In an on-and-off relationship with Dr. Hsiao, who was her psychiatry patient in the prequel. She once miscarried before Hsiao Cheng-hsun left overseas, then later married Hsao Cheng-hsun after realizing his life-threatening haematoma. Yang's birth mother suffered from severe depression after her husband died; she was an alcoholic before she ended her own life.
Lego Lee	Xiong Sen (Xiong Zai)	A gifted surgeon known for his speed, instinctiveness and efficiency. Chief Resident grade, but had no time to sit Department Head qualifications exams. He often commits the cardinal sin of making promises to patients' family, and not following standard operating procedures (SOP) and treats DRG system with disdain, he also has poor emotional and budgetary and resource management, which is why Hsiao Cheng-hsun later merely considered him as a technician, and initially didn't want him to be in the Trauma Unit. Xiong Sen is a thoracic surgeon and member of Trauma Unit by day, and also a rapper who uses his songs to criticise the medical system, but is still on call 24/7. Given his impulsive personality, often a burden to Kang Lian Hospital. Dr. Peng's junior and Zoe's senior in university. He later found out that his father died because he was rejected admission in Li De Hospital in 2003 when he was still in high school, as such, he was also a victim in the Human Meatball Scandal, where patients were unnecessarily turned down by multiple hospitals due to overpopulation, under-staffing and underfunding. Due to this, he also strongly opposes euthanasia, and Never Give Up becomes his mantra. Despite his hatred towards Chen Hsien-jung, he still saved him from being a victim of the same crime he committed to Xiong Sen's father. Xiong Sen later became depressed after he was sued by the lighting technician's family, and also losing his first patients under his care, and another in front of the Medical Standards Authority Personnel. He was later stood down for 2 weeks, partly due to the impending investigations from the mishandling of the car crash women's case as a precaution, but also an excuse for the hospital to force him to take wellness leave, but it also affected his performances as a rapper as he suffered traumatic nausea. He was forced to return to work after Zoe was injured in the suicidal bomb blast where Qiu Chun killed himself and was unable to put Wan Da Qi down with him. After returning, he backed off and let Peng Bo En become the head surgeon to treat Dr. Hsiao's haematoma. However, after he died he saved Wan Da Chi, the same person who indirectly killed his father, but Xiong Sen was discovered to have written rap lyrics on the back of official toxicology and post mortem reports.
Summer Meng	Zoe Shen	A medical journalist with a degree in pharmacy, Xiong Sen's junior in university. Strives for accurate and in-depth investigative journalism, but it goes against every other colleague including his boss in Wake Up Times. She was severely premature as a newborn.
Wu Kang-jen	Yeh Chien-te	39, A surgeon turned insurance agent, but was jailed in the prequel for Hospital Embroilment as a physician. A born-again Christian due to Chen Hsien-jung's influence. He was released from jail 5 years later. Rehabilitating. A lot more diplomatic and stocky than 5 years ago, but still very well connected to everyone in the medical community. He was also a subject of interest to Zoe's developing story about the problems with the medical system. He also found out that Xiong Sen's father was also involved in the AM2 scandal as well, tying both controversies together for Zoe. Zoe invited him to become a special field reporter to interview AM2 Self Help Committee. When he found out the true culprit was Wan Da Qi, he set out to legally bring him to justice as many assassination attempts by the suicide bombers failed.

=== Supporting ===
Cast	Role	Description
Michael Huang	Chen Hsien-jung	Former CEO of Ren Xin and Li Da Hospitals, Yeh Chien-te's mentor. Now works in a rural clinic in Tainan. He was badly injured in a car accident when he drove while exhausted and under the influence of morphine-like substance, but was later discovered as high concentration of AM2. He also worked in Li De Hospital during the Human Meatball Scandal. He was also involved in the AM2 scandal because he prescribed the expired anaesthetic that killed A He and A Chun's mother. He latter recovered well enough to become a tainted witness to take down Chu Chuan-kang and Sally Ou
Huang Xin Yao	Xiong Hui Cheng	Father of Xiong Sen. Former Assistant Legislator. Died in 2003 as he was a casualty of Human Meatball Scandal. It was revealed 13 years later in his autotopsy that Chen Hsien-jung administered the defective anaesthetic AM2, hence making him a victim of Ding Sheng's scandal as well.
Ban Tie-hsiang	Chu Chuan-kang	Adopted father of Yang Wei-yu, CEO of Kang Lian Hospital, he voluntarily stepped down as CEO and chairperson of the hospital to protect Yang Wei-yu from an illegal pharmaceutical rebate scandal.
Kaiser Chuang	Wan Ta-chi	Legislator, persuaded Kang Lian Hospital to form Trauma Unit, so the hospital won't be downgraded to a Regional Hospital, meaning decreased funding and would be downscaled and decreasing budgets and National Healthcare Allowances, but after Kang Lian was downscaled to being a district hospital, his friendship with Chu Chuan-kang soured, and was targeted by many of his adversaries, and was exposed for money-laundering, abuse of power, and framing Chu Chuan-kang and Yang Wei-yu for receiving illegal rebates from pharmaceutical companies. He was a loyal understudy to Wu Wei-yin, but he turned on him and made him a scapegoat. He eventually committed suicide before a formal investigation can commence, but survived, so he decided to become a tainted witness to take Wu Wei-yin down with him.
Chu Lu-hao	Wu Wei-yin	2IC of Health Department, later as Head of Department. He introduced the Healthcare reform in 2016, and also started the sudden assessments in order for him to become Health Department Minister. He also downgraded Kang Lian Hospital due to failing the assessment regarding SOP infractions. He then turned on Wan Ta-chi, and made him the fall guy for not only every scheme that Wan pulled himself for being a serial abettor to murder and accessory to money laundering, but also the scapegoat for the human meatball scandal. He was charged as the Head of Health Department.
Esther Liu	Shih Pei-hsuan	PR of Kang Lian Hospital, often being a spin doctor, but after she quit, she actually has an affair with Wan Da Qi, and has a child together, and teamed up to attempt a takeover, then close the hospital down to profit from the sale of land.
Lan Cheng-lung	Xie Teng-feng	Head of Surgery, also Senior Cosmetic and plastic surgeon. Not a fan of Yang Wei-yu and Xiong Sen, but later became the crucial swing vote to get Yang Wei-yu back in to become the new chairperson of the medical board, replacing Zhuang Zheng Min and her father. He also replaced Chu Chuan-kang as CEO of Kang Lian Hospital in the end, and retained the Trauma Unit, with Xiong being the Acting Head of the Unit.
Kerr Hsu	Wang Chen Yu	Former Resident Physician of Ren Xin Hospital who cleared Hsiao Cheng-hsun's name for his part in killing a woman and exposed Ren Xing for storing expired Dantrolene and other drugs and medicine to cut costs. Head of Emergency Department in Kang Lian Hospital for 3 years.
Ivan Chen	Hank	A hacker, acquainted with Yeh Chien-te in prison as cellmates. He hacked into pharmaceutical databases to disrupt the trading in stock exchange. Living with Ye Chien Te after he was released, who moved to a different place. He was also a converted Christian. He later hacked into the presentation when Ding Sheng tried to upgrade the equipment, and aired all the evidence against Wan Ta-chi and Wu Wei-yin, then managed to legally infiltrate many world news networks to live stream Xiong Sen's rap concert as Kang Lian Hospital staff goes on strike.
Long Chen Han	Peng Bo En	Neurosurgeon and member of Trauma Unit. Often collides with Xiong Sen over conflicting principles. Had worked in Kang Lian for 8 years, Seniors of both Xiong Sen and Zoe Shen, yet Xiong Sen is the primary surgeon. He is a perfectionist, a stickler to the SOP, and extremely well versed in medical statistics. It was also to his detriment as he had to become the head surgeon to treat Dr. Hsiao's haematoma, something that is against ethics.
Peace Yang	Yang Jie Na	4th year resident Cosmetic and plastic surgeon and member of Trauma Unit, dislikes Xiong Sen's way of work and his harassment, and loves to complain with no regard for her junior status, but otherwise is very much like Xiong Sen, who cares a lot about improving the system. She has become more sympathetic after realising Xiong Sen's history after he was threatened to be sued, and later lost his first patient. She was reluctant to enter the Trauma Unit because it reminded her of a physician that committed suicide in front of her.
Lai Hao Zhe	Bi Hao Da Kun	3rd year resident Orthopedics surgeon and member of Trauma Unit, Junior of Xiong Sen in university. He is the least experienced in the unit, but also has the purest heart.
Alice Huang	Lin Yi Cai	Head of Nursing, primarily working in the Emergency Department. She is also the mediator in the Trauma Department.
Huang Rou Min	Zhou Lan	Adoptive mother of Yang Wei-yu, wife of Chu Chuan-kang, was a viola player that played Bach music, especially Air on the G String in her youth.
Frankie Huang	Dr. Zhong	Thoracic surgeon of Kang Lian Hospital. Hates the fact the Xiong Sen would make promises to patients' family and never following Standard Operating Procedures (SOP's), because he can't save everyone, and when he messes up, he won't be able to deal with the consequences. Also, any extracurricular surgeries that cuts into hospital budgets will be at the expense of mid-level department supervisors by taking money out of their wages.
Li Hsuan	Sally Ou	Doctor of Pharmacy, Ding Sheng Pharmacy's CEO, embroiled in expired goods case where the previous generation of painkillers had killed many. She successfully innovated a new generation of painkillers with Optizorb which aid absorption, the same technology in higher-end Panadol. She was unharmed in the Ding Sheng Building bombing.
Danny Liang	A He	President of Ding Sheng AM2 Victim Self Help Committee. AM2 was an anaesthetic that caused Myocardial infarction as its most dangerous side effect.
Shih Ming-shuai	Qiu Chun	Member of Ding Sheng AM2 Victim Self Help Committee. a bomb technician who can also cause suicidal bomb attacks, and was highly suspected to be the bomb-planter in the Ding Sheng Building.
Mutthas Allabadi	Commander	A Special Armed Force police of Jordan. Raided the hospital in the middle of the procedures upon receiving news of bomb threats.
Jumaa Shami	Suspect	Jordanian bombing suspect. Heavily injured in hospital, was going to be apprehended by police, but was killed by a bomb that someone else planted.
Buzz Rhyme (BR)	A member of the rap band Cheer	A member of the rap band
Cheer	Cheer	Leader of rap band
Chang Shui Yi	Tommy	Record producer, who criticized Xiong Zai's performance in the recording studio.
Lin Chi-ju	Qiu Da Yi	Made a bomb to blast the subway station as a way to raise awareness for AM2 victims as their pleas were left unnoticed by any legal protesting or gathering signatures to send to appropriate authorities. He became a suicide bomber and killed himself in the blast. He is not an AM2 self-help member, but may be affected by the defective drugs.
Hank Wang	Lin Hong-ren	Lin Hong Ren was a student of Chen Hsien Rong, and has a similar attitude towards saving lives to Hsiao. He took the blame of the Li De Hospital incident as he was attacked in 2003 by Xiong Sen as the hospital refused to accept his father as a patient which caused his death. Suffering from the stress of public opinions and the inability to find a new job or get reinstated in duty, he committed suicide at the age of 27. A reprisal of season 1, Chen Hsien Rong is still investigating the incident 5 years on.
Sharif Kamal	Basem	Jordanian doctor, Chief Physician. He was killed in the hospital bombing. His mantra is inscribed in his glasses: "Gardener is to take care of life (plants), not to control (the weather, the soil, etc)" as a metaphor to surgeons and doctors with regards to patients.
Areej Dababneh	Salma	Jordanian Nurse, wife of Basem who was survived the hospital bombing, and left for Syria for her next mission.
Ibrahim Othman Folah Al-Fadhal	Ali	Son of Basem and Salma, an avid football fan who was killed by the hospital bombing.
Bai Qi Long	Dr. An	Head of Throacic Surgery, Xiong Sen, Dr. Zhong's university teacher.
Liu Chang Hao	Mr. Du	Head editor of Wake Up Times, only care about shallow and quick reports with scant regard for social responsibility, very different from Zoe, who prefers accurate and in-depth investigative journalism. But the reason behind it was that he was the one who started covered the AM2 issues, but everybody involved in the news are either living in suffering or are no longer alive.
Fan Chiang Tai-chi	News anchor	News anchor for Times News
	Huang Min-hao	52, Patient who was injured in the subway bombing. He needed spleenectomy due to it being ruptured.
	Liu Ka-lun	Southerner, Survived the subway bombing, but had his left leg amputated by Hsiao Cheng-hsun & Xiong Sen, but days later developed Superior vena cava syndrome (SVC syndrome) due to a haematoma in his lungs. He recovered well enough to undergo physiotherapy and occupational therapy, and was later discharged. The actor is actually an amputee.
	Mrs. Liu	Wife of Liu Ka-lun, Southerner, was unhappy about the new operation to remove haematoma, but he was able to recover and gave a positive interview of the hospital and Xiong Sen to the press.
	Lighting Technician	Fell off the 6m platform, in induced coma, but he does not have a Do Not Resuscitate order, so he is still intubated, but is clinically dead.
Wood Lin	Family member	Brother of the lighting technician, he was promised by Xiong Sen that his brother would be saved, but he is in induced coma, but they cannot decide to euthanise him, so he threatened to sue Dr. Xiong and the hospital for gross negligence.
	Chang Jun Hao	In his 70s. Suffered burns and compartment syndrome from the Ding Sheng bombing. Died due to brain haemorrhage. The only fatality in the bombing, and the first fatality of the Trauma Unit and in Xiong Sen's career.
	Prison officer	The prison officer in Tainan's prison when Ye Chien Te was incarcerated and later released in jail.
	Pregnant woman	Sent into Kang Lian from a car crash in which she was the driver, was 21 weeks pregnant with a second child, but died due to internal bleeding, and also suffered miscarriage before her death.
	Father	Husband of the pregnant woman
	Daughter	Eldest daughter of the parents
	Dr. Chiang	Gynaecologist and Obstetrician
Aviis Zhong	Convenience Store Staff	A neighbor of Qiu Cun and his confidante when he confessed that he was the bomber.
	Pang Qiu	4, Peng Bo En's daughter.
	Mrs. Peng	Peng Bo En's wife

== Backstage Roles ==
Off-screen, some actors also function as part of the production crew behind the scenes. Kerr Hsu doubled as a casting assistant to scout for new actors; Alice Huang doubled as a performance director, while Jag Huang doubled as an assistant stunt director. Lin Chi-ju is also the director of the drama, so he stated in the final behind the scenes that he would never direct the scenes that he would act in as Qiu Da Yi, the homeless suicide bomber.

== Soundtrack ==
No.	Title	Lyrics	Music	Performer	Length
1.	"Wimpish" (Opening Theme)	No Party for Cao Dong	No Party for Cao Dong	No Party for Cao Dong
2.	"Never Give Up" (Ending Theme)	BR	Xiao Ren	Lego Lee, BR, 黃健瑋, 王鏡冠, 隆宸翰, Kerr Hsu, Peace Yang, 賴澔哲
3.	"Save Life" (Insert music)	BR	Xiao Ren	Lego Lee, BR
4.	"No One Is the Outsider" (Insert music)	BR	Xiao Ren	Lego Lee, BR
5.	"Caged Beast" (Insert music)	BR	小人	Lego Lee, BR
6.	"Killer in White Uniform" (Insert music)	Han Sen	小人	Lego Lee, BR
7.	"Keep My Faith" (Insert music)	BR	小人	李國毅、BR
8.	"Air on the G String(in C Major)" (Background Music)	None	Bach, August Wilhelmj	None

== Production ==
Filming locations in Taiwan include E-Da Hospital, particularly the cancer care unit and Chinese Medicine GP office in Kaohsiung and Grand Mayfull Hotel in Taipei, the refugee camp in the Northern Borders of Jordan. The subway bombing scene was filmed in Airport Hotel Station in Taoyuan which was still under construction at the time.

== Reception ==
The ending of Wake Up 2 was praised to critical acclaim to critics and audiences alike, though some were slightly divided on the ending.
