= Wu Pong-fong =

Taiwanese actor and choreographer (1964–2020)

- 吳朋奉
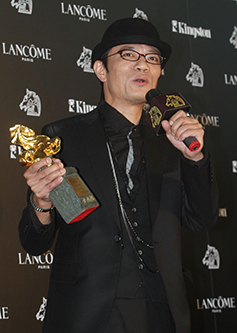
- Wu in 2010
- Born: 2 November 1964; Taipei County, Taiwan
- Died: 25 May 2020 (aged 55); Banqiao, New Taipei, Taiwan
- Occupations: Actor; choreographer
- Awards: Golden Horse Award for Best Supporting Actor; Golden Bell Award for Best Actor in a Miniseries or Television Film

Wu Pong-fong (Chinese: 吳朋奉; Pe̍h-ōe-jī: Ngô͘ Pêng-hōng; 2 November 1964 – 25 May 2020) was a Taiwanese actor and choreographer.

== Biography ==
Wu was born on 2 November 1964. His father was from Zhao'an County in Fujian. His parents married in 1950 and divorced when Wu was eight years old. He lived with his father in Sanchong District. Wu's father was supportive of the Kuomintang, and his uncle led a Second Section of Personnel Office, also known as the Human Resources Second Office, a department in every public institution charged with managing security and monitoring loyalty of public sector employees to the party. Despite censorship of Taiwanese Hokkien at the time, Wu heard the dialect at a young age, as many of his classmates spoke it. In time, Wu began identifying as Taiwanese, and not as a Mainlander. Wu worked as a supervisor in a printing factory, but lost his job after a superior discovered that he was communicating to colleagues the number of vacation days allowed per year under the provisions of the Labor Standards Act.

Wu's first acting experience came when he joined a troupe led by Chou Yi-chang. Wu later became a member of Golden Bough Theatre, and also worked as a choreographer for Flux Waves Dance Theater. He performed leading roles in Golden Bough Theatre's She is So Lovely (2002) and All in One (2005).

Wu was twice awarded the Golden Bell Award for Best Actor in a Miniseries or Television Film, in 2008 for Imprints Of Ceiba Flowers and 2019 for The Roar. He was named the best actor at the 2011 Taipei Film Awards for Ranger. Wu's performance in the film Seven Days in Heaven resulted in a Golden Horse Award for Best Supporting Actor in 2010. He worked with director Wang Yu-lin a second time in the 2012 film Flying Dragon, Dancing Phoenix. Wu was cast as Peng Feng in Lin Fu-ching's debut feature film Jumping Boy, released later that year. In 2016, Wu appeared in We Are Family directed by Jim Wang.

Wu's relatives found him unresponsive at home in Banqiao District on 24 May 2020. After a forensic medical examination had been performed, Wu's agent confirmed that Wu had died, aged 55, of a stroke in the early morning of 25 May 2020.
