= Fengze =

Fengze or Feng Ze can refer to:

- Fengze District of the city of Quanzhou in China
- Kenny Khoo, singer whose Chinese name is Qiu Fengze
