= Tseng Jing-hua =

Taiwanese actor

- 曾敬驊
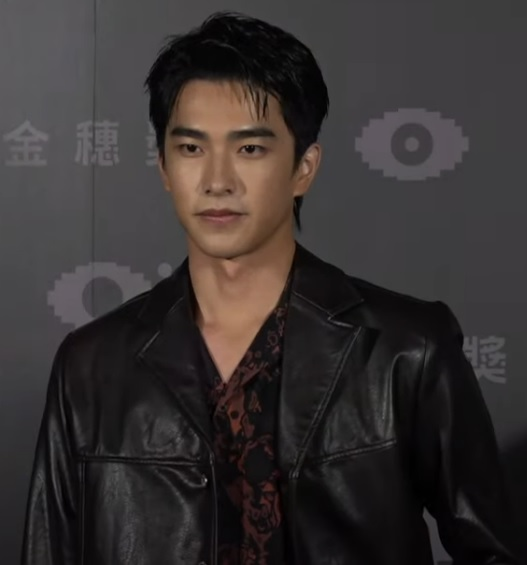
- Tseng in June 2022
- Born: 30 December 1997 (age 28); Dongshan, Yilan, Taiwan
- Other names: Peter Tseng; Zeng Jinghua; Chin-hua Tseng; Ching-hua Tseng
- Education: I-Shou University (BFA)
- Occupation: Actor

Chinese name
- Traditional Chinese: 曾敬驊
- Simplified Chinese: 曾敬骅
- Hanyu Pinyin: Zēng Jìng Huá
- Hokkien POJ: Chan Kèng-hôa

Tseng Jing-hua (Chinese: 曾敬驊; pinyin: Zēng Jìng-Huá; Pe̍h-ōe-jī: Chan Kèng-hôa; born 30 December 1997) is a Taiwanese actor from Yilan. He is best known for playing the character of Birdy in the 2020 film Your Name Engraved Herein, the highest-grossing LGBT film in Taiwan. He also appeared as Wei Chung-ting in the supernatural horror Detention, for which he received a nomination for Best New Performer at the 56th Golden Horse Awards.

In 2025, he won Best Supporting Actor at the 62nd Golden Horse Awards for his performance in Family Matters.

== Education ==
In high school, Tseng was encouraged by his parents to play the saxophone as a member of his high school band and initially intended to pursue a career in swimming, but ultimately chose to study film instead. He chose to attend college at I-Shou University, where he graduated with a bachelor's degree from its Department of Film and Television.

== Career ==
In his first film role, Tseng played Wei Chung-ting, the main male character in Detention who "awakens awakens to the reality of Taiwan’s authoritarian regime" over the course of the film. Set in the 1960s, during the White Terror era, the 2019 production was a box office hit, becoming the only domestically-made movie that year to gross more than NT$100 million in its first week of release. Tseng was nominated for Best New Performer at the 2019 Golden Horse Awards for this role.

The next year, he co-starred in Your Name Engraved Herein as Birdy, one of the two male leads, alongside Edward Chen. The two characters fall in love as Taiwanese high school students in the late 1980s. The production became the highest-grossing LGBT film in Taiwan's history and was also reviewed positively by The New York Times, which lauded their "believable chemistry" and "pretty pining."

In the 2025 film A Foggy Tale, Tseng returned to an artistic work set in the White Terror era. He plays the protagonist's loving older brother 阿雲 A Yun ("cloud"), a soulful artist and political dissident, hiding in a sugarcane field in rural Chiayi to evade the authorities. A Yun uses his knack for charcoal illustrations and storytelling to entertain his younger sister, 阿月 A Yue ("moon"), and inspire her to pursue further education. A Yun's capture and subsequent execution by KMT secret police set in motion the protagonist's quest to retrieve his body in Taipei. All of Tseng's dialogue is in the Taiwanese language.

He also took on the role of serial killer Li Jen-yao, who confesses to murdering former classmates, in the 2025 Taiwanese Netflix production Had I Not Seen the Sun alongside Moon Lee and Alice Ko. The series delves into psychological trauma, school bullying, and criminal behavior, blending suspense with coming-of-age drama.

In the same year, he also played the role of Hsiao Tzu-hsia (Big Summer) in the movie Family Matters, for which he won Best Supporting Actor at the 62nd Golden Horse Awards.

== Filmography ==
=== Film ===
Year	Title	Role	Notes/Ref.
2019	Detention	Wei Chung-ting; also romanized as Wei Chong-ting	
2020	Your Name Engraved Herein	Birdy Wang / Wang Po-te (young)	
2021	Me	Yan Wei-li	
2023	Workers: The Movie	Jun Jie	
2023	Eye of the Storm	Ang Tai-he	
2023	Hello Ghost	Hsu Chen-wei / A-wei	
2025	Family Matters	Hsiao Tzu-hsia ("Big Summer")	
2025	A Foggy Tale	A Yun 阿雲	
2025	That Burning House		
2026	Sinsin and the Mouse	Shingo ("Sinsin")	

=== Television series ===
Year	Title	Role	Notes
2018	PTS Innovative Story-狗罩	Government's Bodyguard, Office's Staff	Cameo
2020-2024	The Victims' Game	Fang Yi-jen (young）	Cameo
2020	Workers	Jun Jie	
2021	Danger Zone	Lu Qi / "Watchman"	
2021-2022	Light the Night	Wu Shao-chiang (young)	
2023	Oh No! Here Comes Trouble	Pu Yi-yong	
2023	At the Moment	Wang Ko-chieh	Ep. 1, 8, 10
2023-2024	Twenty-five	Himself	
2025	I Am Married...But!	Liu Wen-jie	
2025	Had I Not Seen the Sun	Li Jen-yao	

=== Short film ===
Year	Title	Role	Notes
2017	Director′s Cut - Romance Drama Short Film - Destiny	Jian Zi-jue	Video on YouTube
2017	Gum Ghost	Meng-ze	Video on YouTube
2018	Dominate	Lin Shang-hsiu	Video on YouTube

=== Music video appearances ===
- 2020: Crowd Lu - "Your Name Engraved Herein"
- 2020: Yo Lee - "One Who Will (Find Me)"
- 2022: A-Lin - "Best Friend"
- 2024: Terence Lam - "Nocturne"
- 2024: The Chairs - "Survivor"
- 2025: Young Posse - "Cold (ft. 10cm)"

== Awards and nominations ==
Year	Award	Category	Nominated work	Result	Ref.
2019	56th Golden Horse Awards	Best New Performer	Detention	Nominated	
2020	22nd Taipei Film Awards	Best Male Actor	Detention	Nominated	
2024	59th Golden Bell Awards	Best Leading Actor in a Television Series	Oh No! Here Comes Trouble	Nominated	
2025	62nd Golden Horse Awards	Best Supporting Actor	Family Matters	Won	
2026	Global OTT Awards	Best Lead Actor (Male)	Had I Not Seen the Sun	Won	
