= Marry My Dead Body =

2023 Taiwanese film by Cheng Wei-hao

- Theatrical release poster
- Traditional Chinese: 關於我和鬼變成家人的那件事
- Literal meaning: About me and the ghost becoming family
- Hanyu Pinyin: guānyú wǒ hé guǐ biàn jiārén de nà jiàn shì
- Directed by: Cheng Wei-hao
- Screenplay by: Cheng Wei-hao; Sharon Wu
- Story by: Lai Chih-liang
- Produced by: Veronica Jin; Dennis Wu
- Starring: Greg Hsu; Austin Lin; Gingle Wang
- Cinematography: Chen Chi-wen
- Edited by: Chen Chun-hung
- Music by: Kay Liu
- Production company: Calendar Studios
- Distributed by: Bole Film; Vie Vision Pictures
- Release dates: 17 November 2022 (Golden Horse); 10 February 2023 (Taiwan)
- Running time: 130 minutes
- Country: Taiwan
- Languages: Mandarin Chinese; Taiwanese Hokkien

Marry My Dead Body (Chinese: 關於我和鬼變成家人的那件事) is a 2022 Taiwanese supernatural comedy mystery film directed by Cheng Wei-hao and starring Greg Hsu, Austin Lin, and Gingle Wang. Scripted by Sharon Wu and Cheng Wei-Hao, the film is adapted from an original story outline by Lai Zhi-liang. The film premiered at the Taipei Golden Horse Film Festival on 17 November 2022, and was officially released in Taiwan on 10 February 2023. It was nominated for the Golden Horse Best Narrative Feature in 2023.

The story combines the traditional Chinese custom of ghost marriage with a police detective story, as well as a romance between a human and a ghost.

The film was submitted by Taiwan to be nominated for the Academy Award for Best International Feature Film.

The film was adapted into a Thai film by GDH 559, titled "The Red Envelope" (Thai: ซองแดงแต่งผี, RTGS: Sxng dæng tæng phi, lit. 'Red envelope for ghosts'), starring Putthipong Assaratanakul as Wu and Krit Amnuaydechkorn as Mao, directed by Chayanop Boonprakob, was released on 20 March 2025.

== Plot ==
The homophobic and ghost-phobic policeman Wu Ming-han (Greg Hsu) works in the vice department. While collecting evidence from a car crash resulting from his current case, he mistakenly picks up a red envelope, a traditional method of entrapping someone into a ghost marriage. This summons the ghost of Mao Mao (Austin Lin), who was discussing marriage with his boyfriend but died in an accident. Mao Mao's grandma (Wang Man-Chiao), sad that her grandson died unmarried, comes up with the idea of ghost marriage, and convinces Wu Ming-han to marry her unseen grandson. After a series of unlucky events, Ming-han agrees to the marriage. Much to Ming-han's shock and surprise, he discovers Mao Mao's ghost is real. The taoist who officiated the ritual tells him that he shares a past-life connection with Mao Mao and therefore needs to solve his murder to be free of him.

Unhappy about being married to a man, Ming-han begins to attempt to escape the marriage to no avail. With his ghostly partner in tow, he works with his fellow policewoman Lin Tzu-ching (Gingle Wang) to investigate a major case in their department. Ming-Han is able to make a major breakthrough in the case, but is pulled off the case when he is unable to explain his ability to know things only Mao Mao would be able to see, through his ghostly ability.

After a confrontation with Mao Mao’s ex-boyfriend, Mao Mao and Ming-Han come to peace. The two gather and speak by a nearby river and Mao Mao flies up to the sky (presumably to reincarnate). Soon after, Mao Mao returns to warn Ming-Han that his boss is the informant for the local crime gang and is going to attempt to flee to Macau. The police force, Mao Mao and Ming-Han catch the gang and engage in a shootout. Ming-Han catches his boss and confronts him. While questioning his boss, Wu Ming-Han realize Mao-Mao mis-heard his boss: it is Lin Tzu-ching who is the real informant and is planning to frame them for the crime lord's murder.

Tzu-ching escapes and leaves her former colleagues to fight the rest of the gang. Ming-Han is mortally wounded and Mao Mao possesses the drivers to clear the highway for the ambulance. Though they make it in time to save him, Mao Mao's spirit is close to disappearing from possessing dozens of people, which wounds his ghostly form. Mao Mao's father comes to visit and they have a conversation about him. The emotional revelation revitalizes Mao Mao and he moves on to the afterlife. Ming-han continues living his life, but keeps Mao Mao in his memory.

== Cast ==
- Greg Hsu as Wu Ming-han
- Austin Lin as Mao Pang-yu (Mao Mao)
- Gingle Wang as Lin Tzu-ching
- Tsai Chen-nan as Lin Hsiao-yuan
- Wang Man-Chiao as Mao Chen A-lan
- Tuo Tsung-hua as Mao Cheng-kuo
- Ma Nien-hsien as Chang Yung-kang
- Cheng Chih-wei as Temple Master
- Chen Yen-tso as Chubby
- Chang Zhang-xing as A-Gao
- Cliff Cho as Hsiao-Ma
- Kurt Hsiao as district police officer
- Liu Kuan-ting as Police Officer
- Aaron Yan as Chen Jia-hao
- Chris Lee as Jia-hao's boyfriend

== Production ==
Director Cheng Wei-hao had won a Golden Harvest Award and a Golden Horse Award for Best Live Action Short Film for the short film The Death of a Security Guard (2014), and he collaborated with producer Veronica Jin on The Soul (2021), which was nominated a Golden Horse Award for Best Adapted Screenplay. In the same year, the two co-produced the film, Man in Love (2021).

For Marry My Dead Body, Cheng used the same filming team as Man in Love. Cheng also cooperated with Sharon Wu, who wrote the television series In a Good Way (2013), to develop the initial script of Marry My Dead Body. In November 2021, Cheng attended the Golden Horse Awards Nominee Party for The Soul, and revealed that he had started to prepare to shoot his next film. He also stated it would have a black humor theme and feature Greg Hsu as the lead actor. In December 2021, the film crew held an opening ceremony, revealing that another leading actor was Austin Lin. In January 2022, filming was officially completed.

Producers Veronica Jin and Dennis Wu served as judges of the 1st Let's Be Wild contest. In 2018, Lai Chih-liang won the First Prize for Best Creative Story in the contest for the original story of the film, and Lai also won the Bucheon First Prize at the Bucheon International Fantastic Film Festival in 2020 for the same story.

The film crew began to plan the film after the 2018 Let's Be Wild contest, and carried out a long process of script adaptation. The director and the leading actors mentioned that due to the use of many special effects in the film, the shooting and post-production were complicated. For several shots, the actors had to perform solo to a green screen, the air, or the camera. According to the three leading actors, this was the biggest challenge during filming.

== Casting ==
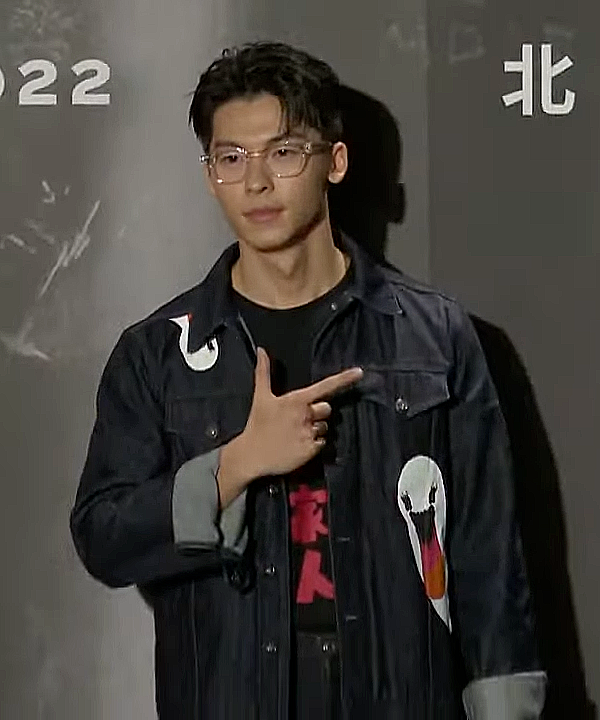
Greg Hsu plays Wu Ming-han

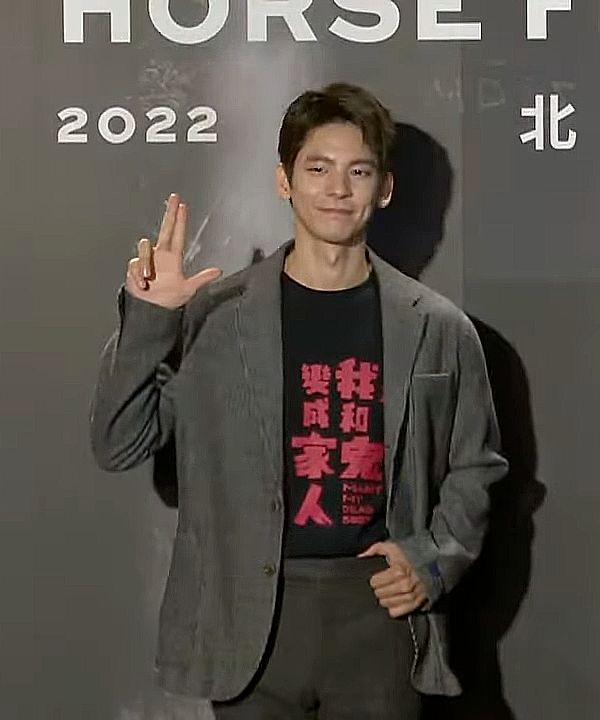
Austin Lin plays Mao Pang-yu

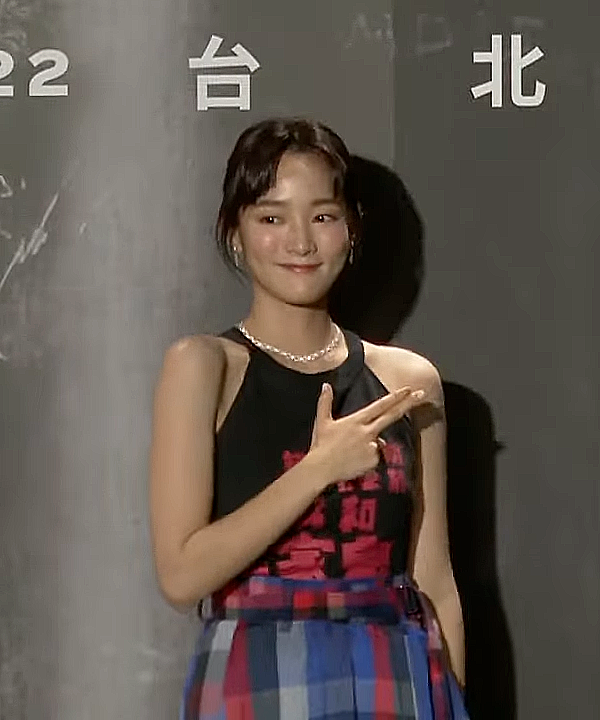
Gingle Wang plays Lin Tzu-ching

Greg Hsu, who was nominated for a Golden Bell Award for Best Leading Actor in a Television Series for Someday or One Day (2019), plays Wu Ming-han, a straight policeman who is passionate and impulsive in handling cases. Director Cheng Wei-hao expressed that he saw Hsu's potential before he became popular because of his work in Someday or One Day, and the deal was reached shortly after he approached Hsu. Hsu said that it is a great honor to cooperate with excellent directors and actors. When he saw the script for the first time, he was attracted to its themes, and stated that he believed that this role needed to have a sense of physique. For the role, he spent several months doing physical exercise before shooting. He said that Wu Ming-han was a challenging role for him, as there were several scenes where he felt embarrassed, including being naked on a flying wire, which made him feel like he had "fallen into the director's trap", but also an opportunity to push himself.

Austin Lin, who won a Golden Horse Award for Best Supporting Actor for At Cafe 6 (2016), plays Mao Pang-yu (Mao Mao), a gay ghost who unjustly died in an accident. Austin stated he found it challenging to perform comedy well, and that Mao was the largest but the loneliest role he had ever played. In the film, only Hsu, who is married to him in the ghost marriage, could see him; other actors had to "turn a blind eye" when they were shooting with him. Austin stated he believed that Mao Mao was a very valuable and special character, and said that he has many gay friends like Mao Mao around him. He stated that he wished to let the audience know that there are many warm and lovely people like Mao Mao in this world through his performance.

Gingle Wang, who won a Taipei Film Award for Best Actress for Detention (2019), plays police officer Lin Tzu-ching. She said that by watching the two leading actors play against each other during filming, she finally realized the joy of being a fujoshi. In her role of a policewoman working among men, she stated that she wished to express how women are vulnerable to discrimination in current society.

== Music ==
The film's theme song "Untitled" is performed by the Golden Melody Award-winner Jolin Tsai, who also participated in the songwriting and production. She and director Cheng Wei-hao had cooperated twice prior to this. Cheng said that when he came up with the theme song in the early stage of film preparation, he thought Tsai was the best choice to perform it.

The song describes the phases of being in love, starting with ambiguity and confusion, then searching and exploring, to sudden enlightenment. The title of the song "Untitled" describes a love that does not need to be defined, but has found the most comfortable state. The song and music video were officially released on 9 December 2022. Directed by Yin Chen-hao, the music video starred Austin Lin and Wang Man-chiao in character as Mao Mao and Mao Chen A-lan. On the same day, Tsai, Cheng, and Lin conducted a live broadcast on the film's official Instagram account, sharing behind-the-scenes stories of music and music video creation.

In addition to the theme song, the film also uses several Tsai's songs as interludes. Cheng said that Tsai is representative of Taiwan's LGBT culture and believes that her songs are suitable for the theme conveyed by the film. The soundtrack of the film was performed by guitarist Kay Liu of Sodagreen, who won a Golden Bell Award for Best Score for a Drama Series for the series, The Pond (2021), where he and Cheng collaborated for the first time. Cheng said that in the previous cooperation, Liu expressed his interest and enthusiasm in making film and television soundtracks, so he was invited to take charge of the soundtrack production on this project.

No.	Title	Lyrics	Music	Performer	Length
1.	"Untitled" (親愛的對象)	Vison Chen; David Ke	Jolin Tsai; Kay Liu	Jolin Tsai	4:54

== Release ==
The Golden Horse International Film Festival announced on 30 August 2022 that this film has been selected as the closing film of 2022. On 11 October 2022, the film's official social media accounts were opened, and a film teaser was released. The film's festival version poster was released on October 17, 2022. A trailer was released on October 28, 2022. A poster was released on 4 November 2022. The premiere was held on 17 November 2022. Cheng Wei-hao, Veronica Jin, Dennis Wu, Greg Hsu, Austin Lin, and Gingle Wang all attended the premiere event. Cheng said that the premiere version was a "limited edition" exclusively for the Golden Horse Film Festival. There was still one month before the completion of the film's post-production period, and post-production adjustments were made before the official release.

The film was screened for its East Coast premiere at the 22nd New York Asian Film Festival in the Taiwan Transcendent section on 17 July 2023.

== Adaptation ==
The film was adapted into a Thai film by GDH 559, titled "The Red Envelope" (Thai: ซองแดงแต่งผี, RTGS: Sxng dæng tæng phi, lit. 'Red envelope for ghosts'), starring Putthipong Assaratanakul as Wu and Krit Amnuaydechkorn as Mao, directed by Chayanop Boonprakob, was released on 20 March 2025.

== Future ==
A spin-off series, GG Precinct, premiered on Netflix on 22 August 2024. Cheng Wei-hao and Yin Chen-hao co-direct and co-wrote the series, with Greg Hsu, Gingle Wang, Ma Nien-hsien, and Chen Yen-tso reprising their roles.

== See also ==
- List of submissions to the 96th Academy Awards for Best International Feature Film
- List of Taiwanese submissions for the Academy Award for Best International Feature Film
