= I Am the Secret in Your Heart =

2024 Taiwanese film by Lai Meng-chieh

- Theatrical release poster
- Traditional Chinese: 夏日的檸檬草
- Directed by: Lai Meng-chieh
- Screenplay by: Lai Meng-chieh
- Produced by: Chen Chi-yuan; Hu Bai-wei
- Starring: Moon Lee; Tsao Yu-ning; Shou Lo
- Cinematography: Kao Tzu-hao
- Edited by: Kipo Lin
- Music by: Sun Shao-ting; Alexander H. Wong; Sing Wu; Cho Chi-jou
- Production company: Rose International Entertainment
- Distributed by: mm2 Entertainment
- Release date: 2 August 2024 (Taiwan)
- Running time: 112 minutes
- Country: Taiwan
- Language: Mandarin

I Am the Secret in Your Heart (Chinese: 夏日的檸檬草) is a 2024 Taiwanese romance film directed and written by Lai Meng-chieh. The film is adapted from the 2014 novel of the same name by Macchiato and stars Moon Lee, Tsao Yu-ning, and Shou Lo. It centers around an ordinary schoolgirl (Lee) who finds herself in a love triangle between a newly transferred student (Tsao) and her childhood friend (Lo). The film was released theatrically in Taiwan on 2 August 2024.

== Plot ==
Wang, a high school student rumored to be in a relationship with her childhood friend Yuzu, returns to school for a new school year. After Yuzu accidentally hits her with a basketball, Wang confronts him. In the chaos, a metal chalk box almost falls on Wang, but a new transfer student, Cheng Yih, intervenes. Intrigued by Cheng's bravery, Wang tries to engage him in conversation, but he remains quiet.

One day, while Cheng walks his dog, White, Wang follows him and they start to talk. However, White runs away, and Wang injures herself trying to catch it. As Cheng carries her to the hospital, he notices a scar on Wang's forehead that resembles one from a girl who once saved him from bullies in his childhood. Cheng had hoped to reunite with that girl, but Wang has no memory of him. At the same time, Hsing-hui, a senior infatuated with Yuzu, captures a photo of Cheng carrying Wang, which stirs jealousy in Yuzu. As Cheng and Wang develop a friendship, Cheng tries to recreate the scene where Wang saved him from the bullies in their childhood, but Wang misses it. The bullies Cheng confronts turn out to be Yuzu's friends, leading to a tense moment between Yuzu and Cheng, where Yuzu asserts he won't let Wang go.

During the school's music festival, Yuzu invites Wang to emcee. While on stage, Wang clarifies that she doesn’t have feelings for Yuzu, prompting Hsing-hui to question Yuzu's patience, which makes him respond positively. Heartbroken, Hsing-hui runs off, prompting Wang to step up and sing with Yuzu. Cheng, watching their performance, feels left out and desperate. The next day, Cheng takes Wang to the roof, suggesting they keep their distance, which upsets her. Seeking comfort, Wang spends time with Yuzu, who skips class for a fun day at the arcade. That night, Yuzu confesses his feelings for Wang, but she pretends to sleep and misses it. Encouraged by her parents, Wang decides to approach Cheng under the pretence of celebrating his birthday. They meet in the park, apologize, and Wang insists Cheng make a wish after eating cake.

However, White suddenly becomes ill and dies despite their efforts to find help. Worse still, Cheng's mother confronts him about sneaking back to their rural town, insisting he return to the United States. The next morning, Cheng bids farewell to Wang, who confesses her love and they start a long-distance relationship. As time passes, Wang and Cheng keep in touch through video calls during significant life events, but their conversations grow stale and eventually drift apart. Ten years later, at a classmate's wedding, Wang learns Cheng has been invited. Outside the church, the two reunite, and Cheng confesses he is still waiting for her and makes a final birthday wish: to live happily ever after together.

== Cast ==
- Moon Lee as Wang Hsiao-hsia, an ordinary and underachieving school-girl
- Tsao Yu-ning as Cheng Yih, a model student newly transferred to Wang's class
- Shou Lo as Yang "Yuzu" Zhong-you, Wang's childhood friend

Also appearing in the film are Lin Mei-hsiu and Jackson Fan as Wang's mother and father; Peggy Tsang as Vicky, Cheng's mother; and Porima Cheng as Hsing-hui, a senior in the rock club who secretly loves Yuzu.

== Production ==
=== Development ===
I Am the Secret in Your Heart was adapted from a romance web novel of the same name written by Macchiato and published on the Taiwanese forum Popo. The story is semi-autobiographical and was penned by Macchiato in 2012 after she discovered her boyfriend had cheated on her. Development for an adaptation began in the same year, and the screenplay took ten years to complete. The project was greenlit by the National Development Fund of the Taiwan Creative Content Agency in March 2023. Director Lai Meng-chieh joined the project after winning a Golden Bell Award for Mad Doctor (2022), and Moon Lee, Tsao Yu-ning, and Shou Lo were announced as the lead actors in August 2023. Before filming began, Tsao took acting, piano, and foreign language classes to prepare for his role. A spin-off short story titled Ten Years was released alongside the tenth-anniversary reprint edition of the novel in 2024, with some of its content also incorporated into the film. The film was presented by mm2 Entertainment at the project market of the 2024 Cannes Film Festival in May 2024. An official trailer and promotional poster were released on 1 June 2024.

=== Filming ===
Principal photography began on 22 August 2023 in Kaohsiung. Filming mainly took place in Kaohsiung and Pingtung County. The school scenes were primarily filmed at Kaohsiung Municipal Tsoying Senior High School and National Kangshan Senior High School, and location shooting occurred at the Pingtung Sugar Factory. The shoot spanned one and a half months and concluded in Taipei in early October.

=== Music ===
The film's theme song, "Heedless," was composed by End Chung, with lyrics written by him and performed by Shou Lo. Moon Lee also covered the song alongside Lo in the film.

== Release ==
I Am the Secret in Your Heart premiered on 30 July 2024, and had its theatrical release in Taiwan on 2 August. It was also selected to be showcased in the Teenage Minds, Teenage Movies section at the 29th Busan International Film Festival. It became available for streaming on Netflix starting 30 December 2024.

== Reception ==
=== Box office ===
I Am the Secret in Your Heart grossed 6.5 million NTD in its opening weekend, and reached 8.7 million five days after its release. By the second week, the film had accumulated 17 million. It raked in 25 million by the third week, and maintained this figure as of late September.

=== Critical response ===
Thomas Kong of Esquire described I Am the Secret in Your Heart as a refreshing Taiwanese romantic comedy that captures the sweetness and challenges of first love, evoking nostalgic feelings while effectively portraying various forms of unspoken love in a simple yet heartfelt narrative. Jonathan Hung of am730 described the film as a delightful addition to Taiwan's coming-of-age romance genre, following the commercial success of You Are the Apple of My Eye (2011), noting that it appeals to young audiences with its familiar yet romantic themes while effectively capturing the essence of unspoken love.
