= Moon Lee =

Moon Lee may refer to:

- Moon Lee (Hong Kong actress) (born 1965)
- Moon Lee (Taiwanese actress) (born 1996)
