= Golden Bell Award for Best Newcomer in a Television Series =

Television award for Best Newcomer

- Awarded for: Best Newcomer in a Television Series
- Location: Taiwan
- Presented by: Bureau of Audiovisual and Music Industry Development
- First award: 1980
- Currently held by: Su Ying for Mad Doctor (2023)
- Website: gba.tavis.tw

The Golden Bell Award for Best Newcomer in a Television Series (Chinese: 電視金鐘獎戲劇節目最具潛力新人獎) is one of the categories of the competition for the Taiwanese television production, Golden Bell Awards. It was first presented by the Government Information Office in 1980, and was discontinued from 1985 to 2014. The category resumed in 2015 and has since been presented annually by the Bureau of Audiovisual and Music Industry Development.

== Winners and nominees ==
indicates the winner

=== 1980s ===
Year	Nominee	English title	Original title	Ref
1980; 15th Golden Bell Awards	Hua Fang	Chun Qu Ji Shi Hui	春去幾時回	
1981; 16th Golden Bell Awards	Ma Ju-feng	Jiu Qing Mian Mian	舊情綿綿	
1982; 17th Golden Bell Awards	Hugh Lee	Tang San Wu Jie	唐三五戒	
1983; 18th Golden Bell Awards	Teng Wei-ting	Qian Shou	牽手	
1984; 19th Golden Bell Awards	Chao Yung-hsin	Yu Nu Shen Di	玉女神笛	

=== 2010s ===
Year	Nominee	English title	Original title	Ref
2015; 50th Golden Bell Awards	-	-	-	
2016; 51st Golden Bell Awards
2016; 51st Golden Bell Awards	Thi Thuy Hang Nguyen	Brides Married Here	新娘嫁到	
2016; 51st Golden Bell Awards	Ben Wu	Love Cuisine	料理高校生	
2016; 51st Golden Bell Awards	Heaven Hai	War Family	我家是戰國	
2016; 51st Golden Bell Awards	Huang Yu-lin	La Grande Chaumiere Violette	紫色大稻埕	
2016; 51st Golden Bell Awards	Cindy Lien	A Touch of Green	一把青	
2017; 52nd Golden Bell Awards
2017; 52nd Golden Bell Awards	He Yu-chen	Have You Ever Fallen in Love, Miss Jiang?	姜老師，妳談過戀愛嗎?	
2017; 52nd Golden Bell Awards	Cammy Chiang	Love of Sandstorm	戀愛沙塵暴	
2017; 52nd Golden Bell Awards	Ha Hsiao-yuan	Family Time	酸甜之味	
2017; 52nd Golden Bell Awards	Sun Ke-fang	Close Your Eyes Before It's Dark	天黑請閉眼	
2017; 52nd Golden Bell Awards	Chen Yu	Love of Sandstorm	戀愛沙塵暴	
2018; 53rd Golden Bell Awards
2018; 53rd Golden Bell Awards	Wayne Sung	Age of Rebellion	翻牆的記憶	
2018; 53rd Golden Bell Awards	Shiny Yao	Age of Rebellion	翻牆的記憶	
2018; 53rd Golden Bell Awards	Michael Chang	Age of Rebellion	翻牆的記憶	
2018; 53rd Golden Bell Awards	Sherry Peng	Roseki	客家劇場–台北歌手	
2018; 53rd Golden Bell Awards	Crowd Lu	A Boy Named Flora A	植劇場-花甲男孩轉大人	
2019; 54th Golden Bell Awards
2019; 54th Golden Bell Awards	Jenny Lee	Love & π	愛的3.14159	
2019; 54th Golden Bell Awards	Shawn Hu	Utopia for the 20s	20之後	
2019; 54th Golden Bell Awards	Liang Shu-han	Girl's Power	女兵日記	
2019; 54th Golden Bell Awards	Tsai Chia-lin	Great Times	大時代	

=== 2020s ===
Year	Nominee	English title	Original
2020; 55th Golden Bell Awards
2020; 55th Golden Bell Awards	He Pei-yun	The Timeless Virtues	忠孝節義
2020; 55th Golden Bell Awards	Moon Lee	The Victims' Game	誰是被害者
2020; 55th Golden Bell Awards	Dabow Hsia	Hate the Sin, Love the Sinner	噬罪者
2020; 55th Golden Bell Awards	Holly Ho	The Mirror	鏡子森林
2020; 55th Golden Bell Awards	Liu Wei-chen	HIStory 3: Make Our Days Count	HIStory3那一天
2021; 56th Golden Bell Awards
2021; 56th Golden Bell Awards	Nguyen Thu Hang	Stay for Love	飄洋過海來愛你
2021; 56th Golden Bell Awards	Lee Yi-chiao	The Magician on the Skywalk	天橋上的魔術師
2021; 56th Golden Bell Awards	Lin Jie-yi	The Magician on the Skywalk	天橋上的魔術師
2021; 56th Golden Bell Awards	Lilo Kao	Girls Win	客家尋味劇場-女孩上場
2021; 56th Golden Bell Awards	Luo Qian-shao	The Magician on the Skywalk	天橋上的魔術師
2022; 57th Golden Bell Awards
2022; 57th Golden Bell Awards	Tammy Lin	Sometimes When We Touch	超感應學園
2022; 57th Golden Bell Awards	Chiang Chih-wei	Danger Zone	逆局
2022; 57th Golden Bell Awards	Chang Shu-yu	Tavern by the Lethe	孟婆客棧
2022; 57th Golden Bell Awards	Selep Ljivangraw	Seqalu: Formosa 1867	斯卡羅
2022; 57th Golden Bell Awards	Masegeseg Zingerur	Seqalu: Formosa 1867	斯卡羅
2023; 58th Golden Bell Awards
2023; 58th Golden Bell Awards	Chanel Wang	Youngsters on Fire	機智校園生活青春向前衝
2023; 58th Golden Bell Awards	Yang Chen	Lesson in Love	第9節課
2023; 58th Golden Bell Awards	Dai Ya-zhi	Dear Adam	親愛的亞當
2023; 58th Golden Bell Awards	Su Ying	Mad Doctor	村裡來了個暴走女外科
