= Vanishing Point (2026 film) =

2026 film directed by Cheng Wei-hao

- Theatrical release poster
- Simplified Chinese: 消失的人
- Hanyu Pinyin: Xiāoshī de rén
- Directed by: Cheng Wei-hao
- Written by: Cheng Wei-hao
- Produced by: Veronica Jin
- Starring: Zheng Kai; Liu Haocun; Roy Chiu; Li Chen; Jiang Yan
- Cinematography: Meteor Cheung
- Edited by: Zhang Kaizhu
- Music by: Kay Liu
- Production companies: QC Media; Tianjin Maoyan Weiying Culture Media
- Distributed by: Tianjin Maoyan Weiying Culture Media
- Release date: May 1, 2026
- Running time: 140 minutes
- Country: China
- Languages: Mandarin; Southwestern Mandarin
- Box office: US$85 million

Vanishing Point (Chinese: 消失的人) is a 2026 Chinese crime thriller film written and directed by Cheng Wei-hao, produced by Veronica Jin, and starring Zheng Kai, Liu Haocun, Roy Chiu, Li Chen, and Jiang Yan. The film was released in China on May 1, 2026.

== Plot ==
A man named Tang Yu discovers that his 9-year-old son has mysteriously vanished from their apartment building on the winter solstice of 2024. Security cameras show no sign of how the child disappeared.

At the same time, in a neighboring apartment, a gambler named Yan Wu is struggling with the aftermath of his father's unexpected death and becomes involved in ongoing conflicts with his landlord, Lin Yutong.

Lin Yutong has her own unresolved trauma: months earlier, she was the victim of a drug-facilitated sexual assault, and the perpetrator has never been identified. As police investigate and new clues emerge, these three seemingly unrelated cases begin to intersect, suggesting they may all be connected by the same underlying mystery.

== Cast ==
- Zheng Kai as Tang Yu, owner of Unit 402 and Tang Nuo's father
- Liu Haocun as Lin Yutong, owner of Unit 301
- Roy Chiu as Yan Wu, tenant of Unit 301
- Li Chen as Lin Wenzhao, Yutong's brother
- Jiang Yan as Ah Yu, Tang Nuo's mother

== Production ==
The film is adapted from the novel Hai Kui by writer Bei Kebang. The book was previously adapted into the television series The Disappearing Child in 2022.

In July 2024, the film was officially registered and approved for production. Filming began in Chongqing in October of the same year, with a shooting schedule of approximately 45 days. More than 80% of the film was shot in Yongchuan District, while the remaining scenes were filmed at various locations across central Chongqing.

== Reception ==
The total box office revenue for the 2026 May Day holiday period in China reached CN¥754 million, with Vanishing Point grossing CN¥262 million to become the highest-grossing film of the holiday season.
