= Pinoy Sunday =

2009 Taiwanese comedy-drama film

- Taiwanese theatrical poster
- Directed by: Ho Wi-ding
- Written by: Ho Wi-ding; Ajay Balakrishnan
- Produced by: Gus Adapon; Natacha Devillers; Mark Meily; Morihisa Matsudaira; Kenichiro Takiguchi
- Starring: Bayani Agbayani; Epy Quizon; Alessandra de Rossi; Meryll Soriano
- Cinematography: Jake Pollock
- Edited by: Wei-Yao Hsu
- Music by: Yeo-Jen Tsai
- Production companies: Changhe Films; NHK; Les Petites Lumieres; Spark Films
- Release dates: 24 October 2009 (NHK Asian Film Festival); 7 May 2010 (Taiwan)
- Running time: 82 minutes
- Countries: Taiwan; Japan
- Languages: Filipino; Mandarin
- Budget: US$750,000

Pinoy Sunday (Chinese: 台北星期天; pinyin: Táiběi Xīngqítiān; lit. 'Taipei Sunday') is a 2009 Taiwanese comedy-drama film directed by Ho Wi-ding about two overseas Filipino workers in Taiwan who get themselves in an adventure all over Taipei when they discover an abandoned red couch.

== Plot ==
Dado Tagalog and Manuel dela Cruz are two Overseas Filipino workers employed with Giant Bicycles in Taiwan. While Dado misses his wife and daughter back home, he has been dating a Personal Care Assistant named Anna. Meanwhile, Manuel has hopelessly been in love with a club hostess named Cecilia. One Sunday after Mass, Manuel tries to ask Cecilia out on a date when he spots her at a hair salon. He does her a favor by buying mango ice drinks for Cecilia and her companions, only for them to flake out on him. Dado foolishly decides to break up with Anna on her birthday, which he had forgotten all along.

As the duo talk about their heartbreaking experiences over lunch, they notice a Taiwanese couple arguing over a red couch that is delivered on their doorstep. When the couple and delivery workers abandon the couch, Manuel sees it as a sign from God and decides that he and Dado bring it back to their dormitory. After a friend overcharges them for offering to deliver it on his truck and the local bus is unable to accommodate it, Dado and Manuel have no choice but to carry the couch on foot. In the middle of their journey, they cross a street when a drunk motorcyclist collides with the couch. The motorcyclist argues heavily with the duo until all three men are sent to the police station when the motorcyclist accidentally hits a policewoman with his helmet. At the precinct, Manuel begins to fear being deported when an officer wonders if the duo stole the couch, but the policewoman lets the duo go after filing her report.

After walking for a few kilometers, the duo rest on the couch when an Ilonggo woman in a taxicab meets them. She offers them a truck for them to borrow for free to deliver the couch the next day, but Manuel politely declines the offer because they would have to leave the couch at that spot overnight, much to Dado's dismay. Manuel offers to buy Dado a snack to calm him down, but when he returns, he sees Dado give the couch away to a junk collector; eventually, the duo chase after and hitch a ride on the junk collector's three-wheeler pickup. They fall asleep during the trip and wake up to discover that they are at a recycling plant. The duo get into an argument and Dado threatens to leave Manuel at the plant, but he changes his mind when he steals a shopping cart from a group of kids and they strap the couch on it. Later, Manuel and Dado argue over using the couch as a side business at the dormitory when a news reporter stops to interview them after they indirectly prevented a young man from jumping off an apartment building during their journey. After they run away from the reporter, she broadcasts a report on them, asking if they are thieves or heroes.

As night falls, the duo ditch the shopping cart to cross the river in a shortcut, but get into yet another heated argument after they nearly drown. Manuel finally admits that they won't make it in time before the curfew, but Dado encourages him to relax. Dado calls Anna and asks for forgiveness. While the dormitory gate closes for curfew, Manuel and Dado spend the rest of the night singing on the couch floating on the river. The next morning, the duo wake up and take a bus home, abandoning the couch on the riverbanks.

Some time afterwards, Manuel and Dado return to the Philippines, where they relax by the beach before going home by tricycle. They talk about what to eat for dinner before thinking about running a furniture business.

== Cast ==
- Bayani Agbayani as Diosdado "Dado" Tagalog
- Epy Quizon as Manuel dela Cruz
- Alessandra De Rossi as Cecilia
- Meryll Soriano as Anna
- Nor Domingo as Carros
- Father Jean-Claude as himself
- Melenie Hung as Joy
- Julia Chen as Grace
- Bowie Tsang as House-moving wife

== Reception ==
James Marsh of Twitch Film admired the film, calling it "a delight from start to finish. Like its characters, it is a film of simple tastes and manageable ambitions, and Ho, together with co-writer Ajay Balakrishnan, does a grand job of telling a very particular story in a way that speaks to us all, regardless of our nationality or background." Ho Yi of Taipei Times described the film as "a lighthearted and humorous tone, opting to depict the sunnier side of the lives of migrant workers, who sing karaoke, laugh, relax and can be themselves on their days off."

== Awards and nominations ==
=== Wins ===
- Best New Director - Ho Wi-ding (47th Golden Horse Awards)
- Best Picture (2010 Comedy Cluj Festival, Romania)
