= Au Revoir Taipei =

- Film poster
- Directed by: Arvin Chen
- Written by: Arvin Chen
- Produced by: In-Ah Lee; Wei-Jan Liu; Michelle Cho; Oi Leng Lui
- Starring: Yao Chun-yao; Amber Kuo; Lawrence Ko; Frankie Kao
- Cinematography: Michael Fimognari
- Edited by: Justin Guerrieri
- Music by: Wen Hsu
- Distributed by: Atom Cinema; Beta Cinema
- Release dates: 14 February 2010 (Berlinale); 2 April 2010 (Taiwan)
- Running time: 85 minutes
- Country: Taiwan
- Languages: Taiwanese; Mandarin; French
- Budget: NTD$30 million

Au Revoir Taipei (Chinese: 一頁台北; pinyin: Yī yè táiběi; lit. 'One Page of Taipei') is a 2010 Taiwanese romantic comedy film set in Taipei and is Arvin Chen's feature directorial debut. It was executive produced by Wim Wenders and won the NETPAC Award at the 2010 Berlin International Film Festival and was considered a box office success in Taiwan.

== Plot ==
Kai, a lovesick young man, wants to leave Taipei in hopes of getting to Paris to be with his girlfriend. Kai spends long nights in a bookstore studying French, where Susie, a girl who works there, begins to take an interest in him. After one extra ordinary night, Kai finds the excitement and romance he was longing for are already right there in Taipei.

== Cast ==
- Yao Chun-yao as Kai
- Amber Kuo as Susie
- Lawrence Ko as Hong
- Joseph Chang as Jiyong
- Tseng Pei-yu as Yuan Yuan
- Tony Yang as Lei Meng
- Frankie Kao as Bao Ge
- Jack Kao as Kai's father
- Chiang Kang-Che as Gao gao

== Awards ==
Au Revoir Taipei won the NETPAC Award at the Berlin International Film Festival 2010, the Jury Award at the Deauville Asian Film Festival in France, the Audience Award at the 2010 San Francisco Asian American International Film Festival, the Golden Durian (Best Film) Award at the 2010 Barcelona Asian Film Festival, and Best Narrative Feature at the Asian Film Festival of Dallas.

Kuo was awarded Best New Actor at the 12th Taipei Film Festival in 2010 for her role as Susie.
