= Veronica Jin =

Taiwanese filmmaker (born 1984/1985)

- 金百倫
- Born: Jin Pai-lunn; 1984 or 1985 (age 40–41); Taiwan
- Education: National Chengchi University (BA)
- Occupations: Producer; screenwriter
- Years active: 2021–present

Veronica Jin Pai-lunn (Chinese: 金百倫; born 1984/1985) is a Taiwanese filmmaker. She co-founded Calendar Studios with director Cheng Wei-hao and was nominated for Best Adapted Screenplay in the 58th Golden Horse Awards for co-writing The Soul (2021).

== Early life and education ==
Jin was born in 1984 or 1985 to insurance entrepreneur Jin Ning-hai. Her father is an acquaintance of film producer Hsu Li-kong, who provided her with connections when Jin entered the film industry. She joined the drama club and became interested in performance when she was studying in high school, but had never thought of becoming an actress. She attended National Chengchi University and graduated with a Bachelor of Arts in land economics, as she described she was inclined towards a more pragmatic career path at the time. After graduation, Jin worked at a tech startup, an airline company, and coffeehouse chain. She made a guest appearance on the talk show Kangsi Coming while serving as the chief brand officer for the coffeehouse company.

== Career ==
Jin switched careers and entered the film industry when she was almost 30 years old, joining UNI Connect Broadcast Production as general manager and worked on project investments for about five years. During the COVID-19 pandemic, the company had acquired the distribution rights for Yin Chen-hao's romance film Man in Love, but the project was forced to be cancelled due to budget cuts. Jin, who liked the screenplay and felt it was a pity to waste such potential, decided to purchase the rights and started her own film production company, Calendar Studios, with her boyfriend and film director Cheng Wei-hao in 2020. Jin and her company debuted with the release of Man in Love in 2021. She also produced and co-wrote the sci-fi film The Soul with Cheng, which earned her nominations for Best Adapted Screenplay in the 58th Golden Horse Awards and Best Screenplay in the 3rd Taiwan Film Critics Society Awards. In the same year, Jin produced Cheng's television series debut The Pond.

Jin once again served as the executive producer for Cheng's supernatural comedy film Marry My Dead Body in 2023. The film represented Taiwan in being nominated for Best International Feature Film in the 96th Academy Awards, and became the seventh high-grossing Taiwanese film of all time. During the film's post-production, Jin and Cheng conceptualised the idea for a spin-off, which eventually developed into the 2024 Netflix crime comedy series GG Precinct. In 2026, she produced the Chinese crime thriller Vanishing Point, also directed by Cheng.

== Filmography ==
=== Film ===
Year	Title	Producer	Writer	Notes/Ref.
2021	Man in Love	Yes	No	
2021	The Soul	Yes	Yes	
2023	Marry My Dead Body	Yes	No	
2026	Vanishing Point	Yes	No	

=== Television ===
Year	Title	Producer	Writer	Notes/Ref.
2021	The Pond	Yes	No	
2024	GG Precinct	Yes	No	

== Awards and nominations ==
Year	Award	Category	Work	Result	Ref.
2021	58th Golden Horse Awards	Best Adapted Screenplay	The Soul	Nominated	
2022	3rd Taiwan Film Critics Society Awards	Best Screenplay	The Soul	Nominated	
