= Sun Anke =

Chinese actress

- Born: 2 February 1998 (age 28); Tonghua, Jilin, China
- Other name: Zhang Xiaowei (张晓唯)
- Education: Beijing Film Academy
- Occupation: Actress
- Years active: 2016–present

Chinese name
- Simplified Chinese: 孙安可
Transcriptions
Standard Mandarin
- Hanyu Pinyin: Sūn Ānkě

Sun Anke (Chinese: 孙安可; born 2 February 1998), also known as Zhang Xiaowei (Chinese: 张晓唯), is a Chinese actress. She is best known for her roles in the dramas Master Devil Do Not Kiss Me (2017), Heavenly Sword and Dragon Slaying Sabre (2019), Arsenal Military Academy (2019), and Dreaming Back to the Qing Dynasty (2019).

== Career ==
She was born on 2 February 1998 in Tonghua, Jilin, China.

She made her acting debut in 2016 after graduating from Beijing Film Academy.

In 2016, Sun made her acting debut in the horror film Failure Ghost Remember. She then starred in the romance comedy drama Master Devil Do Not Kiss Me.

In 2019, Sun gained recognition for starring in wuxia drama Heavenly Sword and Dragon Slaying Sabre, playing Yang Buhui. The same year, she starred in historical romance drama Dreaming Back to the Qing Dynasty as one of the main leads.

In 2020, Sun was cast in the historical drama Winner Is King, based on the novel Sha Po Lang by Priest.

== Filmography ==
=== Film ===
Year	English title	Chinese title	Role	Notes/Ref.
2016	Failure Ghost Remember	衰鬼记	Niu Lili	
2021	The Soul	缉魂	Li Yan	
2023	Across the Furious Sea	涉过愤怒的海	Shen Xiaolin	

=== Television series ===
Year	English title	Chinese title	Role	Network	Notes/Ref.
2016	The Curious Journey of Chen Ergou	陈二狗的妖孽人生	Wei Dongchong	Tencent	
2016	Qi Huang Wu Lang Hei Zhi Shen Ji Mi Ce	七黄五狼黑之神机秘策	Jing Hong	Tencent	
2017	Master Devil Do Not Kiss Me	恶魔少爷别吻我	Mo Xinwei	Tencent	
2019	Heavenly Sword and Dragon Slaying Sabre	倚天屠龙记	Yang Buhui	Tencent	
2019	Arsenal Military Academy	烈火军校	Qu Manshu	iQiyi	
2019	The Locked Room	上锁的房间	Gu Ying	Youku	
2019	Dreaming Back to the Qing Dynasty	梦回	Ming Hui	Tencent	
2020	Fairyland Lovers	蓬莱间	Wu Ke	Tencent	Cameo
2021	Humans	你好，安怡	Qu Sijia		
2021	Truth or Dare	花好月又圆	Chen Yingyao	Youku	
2021	Winner Is King	杀破狼	Chen Qingjia	Tencent	
2021	The Bond	乔家的儿女	Sun Xiaorong	Zhejiang Television, Jiangsu Television	
2022	Life is a Long Quiet River	心居	Feng Qianqian	Dragon TV, Zhejiang Television, iQiyi	
