= Terrorizers (2021 film) =

- Theatrical release poster
- Directed by: Ho Wi-ding; Hu Chih-Hsin
- Written by: Ho Wi-ding; Natasha Sung
- Produced by: Tina Yin; Hu Chih-Hsin
- Starring: Austin Lin; Moon Lee; Annie Chen; J.C. Lin; Ding Ning; Yao Ai Ning
- Cinematography: Jean-Louis Vialard
- Edited by: Ho Wi-ding; Huey Lee
- Production company: Changhe Films
- Release dates: September 10, 2021 (TIFF); November 19, 2021 (Taiwan)
- Running time: 127 minutes
- Country: Taiwan
- Language: Mandarin

Terrorizers (Chinese: 青春弒戀) is a 2021 Taiwanese romantic drama film directed by Ho Wi-ding and Hu Chih-Hsin, starring Austin Lin, Moon Lee, Annie Chen, J.C. Lin, Ding Ning and Yao Ai Ning.

== Cast ==
- Austin Lin as Guo Ming Liang
- Moon Lee as Chen Yu Fang
- Annie Chen as Monica
- J.C. Lin as Zhang Dong Ling
- Ding Ning as Lady Hsiao
- Yao Ai Ning as Kiki

== Release ==
The film premiered at the 2021 Toronto International Film Festival on 10 September 2021. The film was officially released in Taiwan on 19 November.

== Reception ==
John Berra of Screen Daily wrote that the film "maintains interest throughout" while "emphasising some difficult truths about the human condition." Christy Deng of ELLE praised the performances of Austin Lin, Moon Lee, Annie Chen and J.C. Lin.

Cliff Lee of The Globe and Mail rated the film 2.5 stars out of 4. udn.com criticised the film's usage of stereotypes of youths. HK01 criticised the script and felt that the characters were simply "tools".
