= Heaven Hai =

Taiwanese host and actress

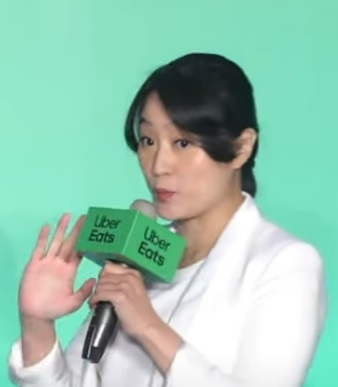
- Hai in August 2022
- Born: May 19, 1977 (age 49); Taiwan
- Other name: Hai Fen
- Education: Fu Jen Catholic University
- Occupations: Television and event host, actress, entrepreneur, television producer
- Years active: 2000s–present
- Children: 1

Chinese name
- Chinese: 海裕芬
- Hanyu Pinyin: Hǎi Yùfēn

Alternative name
- Chinese: 海芬
- Hanyu Pinyin: Hǎi Fēn

Heaven Hai Yu-fen (Chinese: 海裕芬; born May 19, 1977), also known as Hai Fen, is a Taiwanese host, actress, entrepreneur and television producer. She had her debut as a host for TVBS-G, on Entertainment News, and has appeared in several television series and films since 2009. In 2016, she was nominated for the Golden Bell Award for Best Newcomer in a Television Series for War Family.

== Personal life ==
In 2021, Hai developed "Lu Lu Gu Lu" (嚕嚕姑滷), a line of braised food products, and created the concept art for the product line.

In November 2022, Hai gave birth to a daughter, nicknamed "Nian Nian" (念念).

== Filmography ==
=== Television series ===
Year	English title	Original title	Role	Notes
2009	ToGetHer	愛就宅一起	Project team member	
2011	Sunny Happiness	幸福最晴天	Supervisor	
2013	The Pursuit of Happiness	愛的生存之道	Ji An-li	
2014	You Light Up My Star	你照亮我星球	Screenwriter	
2014	Life Story - Article 274 in Criminal Law	公視人生劇展─刑法第274條	Zhuang Chen-ru	
2015	Marry Me, or Not?	必娶女人	Assistant manager	
2016	War Family	我家是戰國	Zeng Xiao-yan	
2016	Oba	我們是歐爸	Qiu Bing-xin	Webseries
2016	Life Plan A and B	荼蘼	Real estate agent	Episode 3
2016	Unknown Lovers - Mommy's Boy Lover	X情人－媽寶情人	Emily	Webseries
2017	Ms. GoodLone	咕咾小姐	Shao Jia-fen	Webseries
2017	A Boy Named Flora A	植劇場－花甲男孩轉大人	Zheng Guang-hao	
2017	Days We Stared at the Sun II	他們在畢業的前一天爆炸2	Guan	Special appearance
2017	Midnight Diner	深夜食堂	Host	
2017	Newbie Office	菜鳥職劇場	Teresa	Webseries
2017	My Dear Boy	我的男孩	Wei-wei	
2018	Tree in the River	動物系戀人啊	Sha-sha	
2018	Between	三明治女孩的逆襲	Jiang Mei-yun	
2018	The Ex-Man	前男友不是人	Chen Da-fa	Also as co-writer
2018	My Bromance	我的鮮肉弟弟	Kary	Webseries
2018	Rock Soulmate	搖滾畢業生	Xian-gu	Webseries
2018	Utopia for the 20s	20之後	Li Wan-hui	Webseries
2019	Without Her, Even Hero is Zero	我是顧家男	Grace	
2019	All is Well	你那邊怎樣·我這邊OK	Mei	
2019	The Teenage Psychic 2	通靈少女2	Li Yi-fen	
2020	Adventure of the Ring	戒指流浪記	Journalist	
2020	The Wonder Woman	跟鯊魚接吻	May	
2020	Futmalls	預支未來	Chief editor	
2020	Radio! Ready Oh!	陽光電台不打烊	Qi	
2021	Sometimes When We Touch	超感應學園	Cai Ban-xian	
2021	Light the Night	華燈初上	Ko Hsiu-chih	
2022	Twisted Strings	良辰吉時	Zhi-ping's wife	
2022	Mad Doctor	村裡來了個暴走女外科	Hong	
2022	Women in Taipei	台北女子圖鑑	TKLab team leader	

=== Film ===
Year	English title	Original title	Role	Notes
2018	Back to the Good Times	花甲大人轉男孩	Zheng Guang-hao	
2018	More than Blue	比悲傷更悲傷的故事	Maggie	
2019	Big Three Dragons	大三元	Sheng Yu-zhu	
2019	Fabulous 40	一起衝線	Xu Ruo-qing	
2019	The 9th Precinct	第九分局	Madam Chen	
2019	The Last Thieves	聖人大盜	Show host	
2019	Stand by Me	陪你很久很久		
2020	Girl’s Revenge	哈囉少女	School counselor	Special appearance
2020	My Missing Valentine	消失的情人節	Scam victim	Special appearance
2021	I Missed You	我沒有談的那場戀愛	Interviewee	

=== Variety and reality show ===
English title	Original title	Notes
Entertainment News	娛樂新聞	As host
Super Followers	海芬的大明星小跟班	As host and producer

=== Music video appearances ===
Year	Artist	Song title
2010	Jay Chou	"Fade Away"

== Theater ==
English title	Original title	Notes
Human Conditions 1	人間條件1	
Can Three Make It	三人行不行	

== Discography ==
=== EPs ===
Year	Title	Notes
2017	Miss Goodlone	

== Published works ==
- Hai, Heaven (2017). Miss Goodlone 咕咾小姐：破處難嗎？. Taiwan: Kadokawa Taiwan. ISBN 9789864737369.
- Hai, Heaven (2020). Wo Yi Ge Ren, E Le! 我一個人，餓了！. Taiwan: Heliopolis Culture Group. ISBN 9789862489215.

== Awards and nominations ==
Year	Award	Category	Nominated work	Result
2016	51st Golden Bell Awards	Best Newcomer in a Television Series	War Family	Nominated
