= Had I Not Seen the Sun =

2025 Taiwanese suspense drama television series

Chinese name
- Traditional Chinese: 如果我不曾見過太陽
Transcriptions
Standard Mandarin
- Hanyu Pinyin: Rúguǒ wǒ bùcéng jiànguò tàiyáng
Southern Min
- Tâi-lô: nā-sī guá m̄ bat kìnn--kuè li̍t-thâu
- Genre: Crime drama Thriller
- Written by: Lin Hsin-Hui; Chien Chi-Feng
- Directed by: Jiang Ji-Zheng; Chien Chi-Feng
- Starring: Tseng Jing-hua; Moon Lee; Chiang Chi; Lyan Cheng
- Country of origin: Taiwan
- Original languages: Taiwanese Mandarin, Taiwanese Hokkien
- No. of seasons: 2
- No. of episodes: 20

Production
- Producer: Ma Yi-ting
- Production companies: Make A Deal International Production Co., Ltd.

Original release
- Network: Netflix
- Release: November 13, 2025 – present

Had I Not Seen the Sun (Chinese: 如果我不曾見過太陽) is a Taiwanese coming-of-age romantic thriller television series produced by the team behind Someday or One Day and the studio Make A Deal International Production Co., Ltd. It is distributed by Netflix.

The work will be released in two parts: Part 1 premiered on November 13, 2025, and Part 2 is scheduled for release on December 11, 2025. This comprises a single season. It is directed by Jiang Ji-Zheng and Chien Chi-Feng, written by Lin Hsin-Hui and Chien Chi-Feng, and stars Tseng Jing-Hua, Moon Lee, Chiang Chi, and Lyan Cheng. The series centers on campus incidents, traumatic memories, psychological states, and the truth behind a criminal case, blending elements of youth romance, coming-of-age drama, and psychological mystery.

== Premise ==
Twenty-five-year-old Li Jen-yao (played by Tseng Jing-hua) turns himself into the police, confessing involvement in several murders of his former high school classmates. His case quickly draws widespread media attention, and he is labeled by reporters as the "Rainstorm Killer". While he is interviewed in prison for a documentary, research assistant Chou Pin-yu (played by Chiang Chi) uncovers unexpected clues related to dreams, memory distortions, and conflicting truths. The appearance of the enigmatic girl Chiang Hsiao-tung (played by Moon Lee) gradually links past campus events with the present, revealing the deeper trauma and hidden truth beneath the case.

== Plot Summary ==
Had I Not Seen the Sun follows Chou Pin-yu, a documentary production assistant suffering from insomnia, paranoia, and dissociative episodes while working on a film about convicted serial killer Li Jen-yao. As she interviews Li, who murdered several former classmates, Pin-yu experiences disturbing visions and relies heavily on her cousin Shen Mu for emotional support.

The investigation reveals that Li’s victims were involved in the sexual assault of a classmate, Chaing Hsiao-tung, whose abuse was covered up through political influence and intimidation. In flashbacks to 2007, Hsiao-tung befriends Li at school, drawing the attention of Ouyang Ti, the violent son of a powerful crime figure. After Li is framed on drug charges and Hsiao-tung is assaulted by Ouyang Ti and his associates, authorities discredit her account, forcing her family to change her appearance, erase her identity, and relocate.

Years later, Li is released from prison and reunites unknowingly with Hsiao-tung, now living under a new identity and suffering from dissociative identity disorder. As Li confirms the fate of her attackers, he begins murdering them in a series of revenge killings, assisted indirectly by Shen Mu. His actions escalate, ultimately resulting in innocent casualties, leading Li to turn himself in and receive a death sentence.

In the present, Pin-yu’s identities collapse when she encounters a woman who reveals that Pin-yu herself is one of Hsiao-tung’s dissociated personas. Regaining her memories, she realizes that the documentary investigation was a confrontation with her own trauma. The production is halted to protect her from renewed public scrutiny, while Li is executed after political pressure from the Ouyang family.

The series concludes with Hsiao-tung committing suicide. A post-credits scene depicts the two reuniting in the afterlife, fulfilling a promise to meet again.

== Cast ==
Actor	Role	Description
Tseng Jing-hua	Li Jen-yao	Central character accused of involvement in multiple murders.
Moon Lee	Chiang Hsiao-tung	A mysterious girl connected to Li Jen-yao's past.
Lyan Cheng	Lai Yun-chen	Cousin of Chou Pin-yu and close friend of Chiang Hsiao-tung.
Chiang Chi	Chou Pin-yu	Documentary research assistant whose investigation propels the story.
Yao Chun-yao	K-ge	A debt collector.
Chih-Tian Shih	Ouyang Ti	Li Jen-yao's high school classmate.
Alice Ko	Hsia Tien Ching	A split personality of Chiang Hsiao Tung & Chou Pin Yu.

== Production ==
The series is produced by Ma Yi-ting and distributed by Netflix. Filming took place in multiple locations across Taiwan, including school campuses, prison facilities, and riverbank areas. The series explores themes of psychological trauma, school bullying, and criminal psychology, combining suspenseful storytelling with coming-of-age elements.

== Songs ==
No.	Title	Single	Length
1.	"曾經見過太陽" (片頭曲)	孫盛希
2.	"Dance With You" (插曲)	KAXA
3.	"覆蓋回憶" (插曲、片尾曲)	蔡承祐
