= Yao Chun-yao =

Taiwanese actor and television host (born 1984)

- Born: 29 October 1984 (age 41); Taipei, Taiwan
- Other name: Jack Yao
- Occupations: Actor; television host
- Years active: 2006–present
- Spouse: Lin Yi (m. 2023)

Chinese name
- Traditional Chinese: 姚淳耀
- Jyutping: Jiu4 Seon4 Jiu6
- Hokkien POJ: Iâu Sûn-iāu

Yao Chun-yao or Jack Yao (Chinese: 姚淳耀; pinyin: Yáo Chúnyào; Pe̍h-ōe-jī: Iâu Sûn-iāu; born 29 October 1984) is a Taiwanese actor and television host. He is best known for his role in the critically acclaimed 2010 Taiwanese film Au Revoir Taipei, which won the NETPAC Award at the 2010 Berlin International Film Festival. He is also known for hosting the Taiwanese long-running television show Stories in Taiwan. He won Best Host for a Travel Program at the 51st Golden Bell Awards.

== Personal life ==
Yao married Lin Yi, his girlfriend of 11 years, on 11 January 2023.

== Filmography ==
=== As host ===
Year	English title	Original title	Role	Notes
2014–2017	Stories in Taiwan	在台灣的故事	Host	

=== Film ===
Year	English title	Original title	Role	Notes
2006	Mei	美	Kai	Short film
2010	Au Revoir Taipei	一頁臺北	Kai	
2013	Will You Still Love Me Tomorrow?	明天記得愛上我	Wedding MC	Cameo
2013	Journey	回家路上	Kang	Short film
2014	Peace in Love	痞子遇到愛	Wu Tien-tsai	
2014	When the Cold Wind Blows	當冷風吹起		Short film
2018	Omotenashi	盛情款待		
2020	Dear Tenant	親愛的房客	Wang Li-wei 王立維	
2023	My Heavenly City	我的天堂城市	Jason 家生	
2023	A Boy and a Girl	少男少女		
2025	Family Matters	我家的事		

=== Television series ===
Year	English title	Original title	Role	Notes
2010	Farewell Summer	再見夏天	Hung	
2013	In A Good Way	我的自由年代	Liao Ji-chi	
2015	Say Again Yes I Do	再說一次我願意	Tai Chih-cheng	
2016	The Best of Youth	燦爛時光	Hsu Ming-chiang	
2022	The Amazing Grace of Σ	我願意	Ben Sheng	
2023	Copycat Killer	模仿犯	Chen He-ping	
2023	Oh No! Here Comes Trouble	不良執念清除師	Zheng Li-song	
2025	Had I Not Seen the Sun	如果我不曾見過太陽	K-ge	

=== Music video appearances ===
Year	Song title	Artist
2011	"奇幻精品店"	Peggy Hsu
2012	"Steel Bridge"	APHASIA
2017	"冬眠 If Winter Comes, Can Spring be Far Behind?"	Enno Cheng
2020	"这样好吗 How about this"	Weibird 韦礼安

== Awards and nominations ==
Year	Award	Category	Nominated work	Result
2017	51st Golden Bell Awards	Best Host for a Travel Program		Won
2020	55th Golden Bell Awards	Best Leading Actor in a Television Series	The Mirror	Won
2023	58th Golden Bell Awards	Best Leading Actor in a Television Series	Copycat Killer	Nominated
2025	60th Golden Bell Awards	Best Leading Actor in a Miniseries or Television Film	My Unexpected Roommate	Nominated
2025	62nd Golden Horse Awards	Best Supporting Actor	Family Matters	Nominated
