= Lyan Cheng =

Taiwanese actress, model and singer

- 程予希
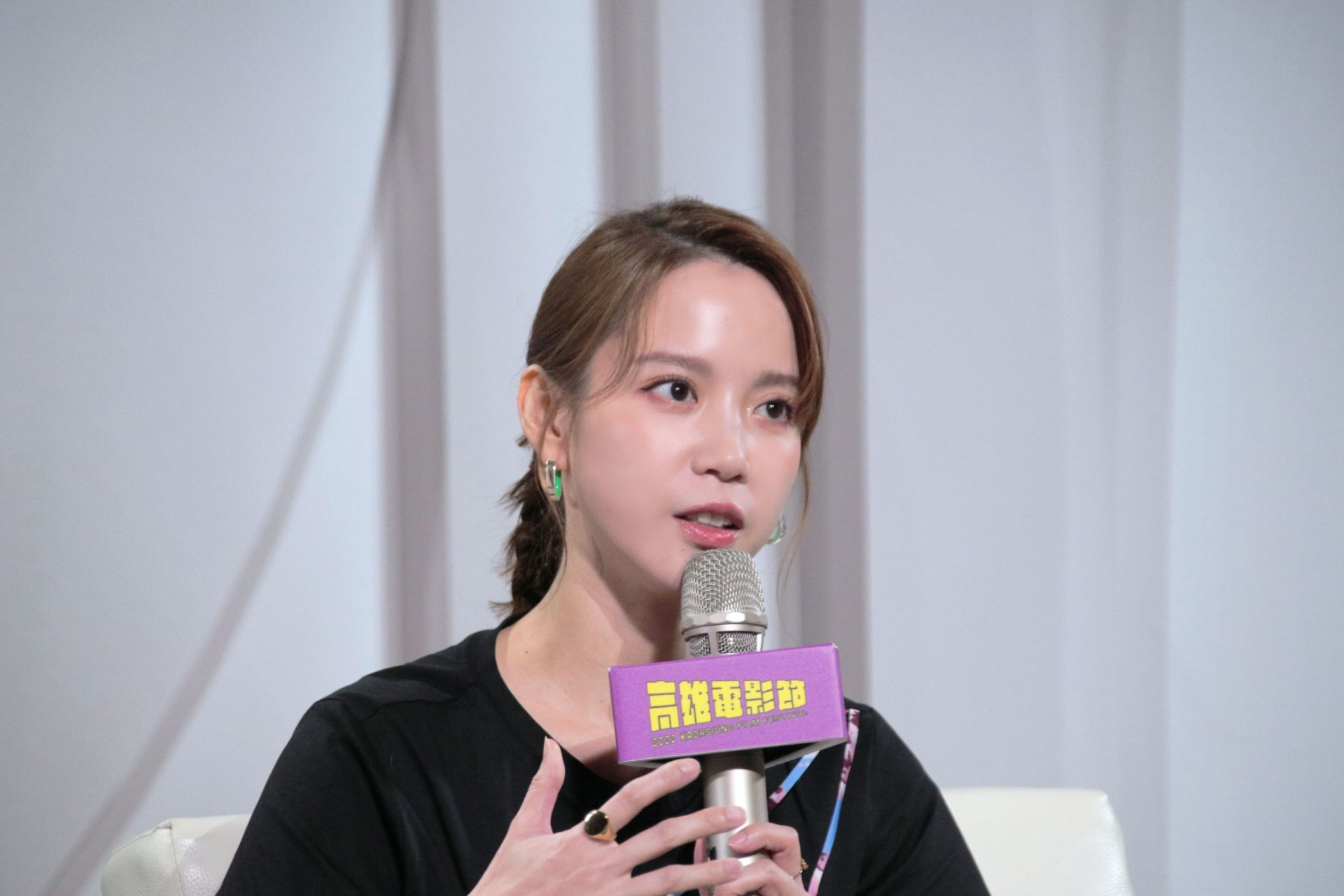
- Cheng in 2022
- Pronunciation: Chéng Yǔxī
- Born: 16 June 1988 (age 37); Taipei County, Taiwan
- Occupations: Actress; model; singer
- Years active: 2010–present

Lyan Cheng (Chinese: 程予希; pinyin: Chéng Yǔ Xī, born 16 June 1988) is a Taiwanese actress, model and singer. She is best known for her lead role in the 2013 romantic-comedy series Fabulous Boys alongside Jiro Wang, Hwang In Deok and Evan Yo.

== TV series ==
| Years | Title | Role | Notes |
|---|---|---|---|
| 2010 | Year of the Rain (那年，雨不停國) | An Qi | |
| 2013 | Fabulous Boys (原來是美男) | Gao Mei Nu / "Gemma" Gao Mei Nan | |
| 2014 | GTO TAIWAN | Xiao Mei | |
| 2014 | Itazura na Kiss 2: Love in Okinawa | Gao Mei Nan | |
| 2014 | Aim High | Tian Ming Xiang | |
| 2014 | Angel 'N' Devil | Xiao Yang | |
| 2016 | Rock Records in Love | Qiu Ke Xin/Qiu Ri Yin | |
| 2016 | The Ultimate Ranger | Ju Shuang "A Jiu" | |
| 2016 | High 5 Basketball | Huang Ya Lun | |
| 2017 | The Man from the Future | Wu Jie En | |
| 2018 | My Bittersweet Taiwan | Meng Yun Hua | |
| 2019 | Best Interest | He Jia Jia | |
| 2019 | Deja Vu | Mei Nv nv Shi | |
| 2020 | Animal Whisper (黑喵知情) | Xiao Lin | Supporting Role |
| 2020 | Young Days No Fears (我的青春沒在怕) | Li Mei Qi (Maggie) | 1/2 Female Lead |
| 2020 | The Devil Punisher (天巡者) | Yao Mu Qing | Cameo (4-6) |
| 2024 | A Wonderful Journey (華麗計程車行) | Wei Xin Yi | |
| 2025 | Had I Not Seen the Sun (如果我不曾見過太陽) | Lai Yun-chen | |

== Internet video ==
- Fell in love with Yahoo (愛上雅虎)
- 36 cups of coffee (第36杯咖啡)
- direction mio-heart mio-心的方向)
- sym-white lover (白色情人)
- I love you in TOKYO (我愛你 in TOKYO)

== MV ==
- io - true (真實)
- F.I.R - find my way
- Freya Lim 林凡- injured (重傷)
- Denise Ho 何韻詩- shallots (青蔥)
- Denise Ho 何韻詩- Aozora (青空)
