= Moon Lee (Taiwanese actress) =

Taiwanese actress (born 1996)

- 李沐
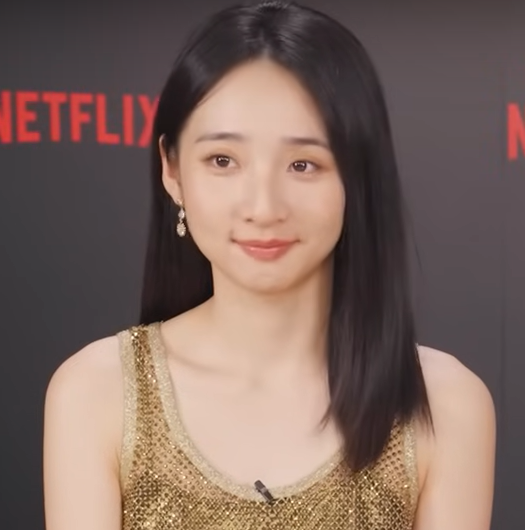
- Lee in June 2024
- Born: 10 December 1996 (age 29); Taiwan
- Education: Shih Chien University; University of the Arts London
- Occupation: Actress
- Years active: 2018–present

Moon Lee (Chinese: 李沐; born 10 December 1996) is a Taiwanese actress. She made her debut with a minor role in the television series On Children (2018) and landed her first leading role as Chiang Hsiao-meng in the Netflix crime series The Victims' Game (2020–2024), for which she won Best Newcomer in the 55th Golden Bell Awards. Since then, she has starred in the films Terrorizers (2021) and My Best Friend's Breakfast (2022), earning nominations for the Golden Horse Award and Taipei Film Award, respectively.

== Early life and education ==
Lee was born on 10 December 1996. She has two younger sisters, and was raised by her grandparents. She attended and graduated from Taipei Municipal Zhongshan Girls High School. Aspiring to become a fashion designer, Lee enrolled at Shih Chien University to study fashion design. During her university years, she began working as a model and filming music videos starting in 2017. After a year at Shih Chien, she reflected on her interests and realized that while she enjoyed art, she did not have a passion for designing on demand or providing services. She then suspended her studies at Shih Chien and moved abroad to study at the University of the Arts London in 2018. There, she pursued a Bachelor of Arts in Fine Arts, specializing in Sculpture. While in the United Kingdom, she was discovered by a talent scout on Instagram and invited to audition for The Victims' Game. She completed the casting process via video call and recorded a four-minute performance video in her dormitory. At the age of 19, she suspended her studies and returned to Taiwan after receiving the role.

== Career ==
Lee's early roles before studying abroad in the United Kingdom included starring as Shih Yu-jie, a transferred student trying to fit into an elite school in the 2018 drama series On Children, and as Chou Hsin, a member of the underground reading club in the 2019 horror film Detention. She landed her first leading role as Chiang Hsiao-meng in the 2020 Netflix crime series The Victims' Game. Her performance was well received, and she earned Best Newcomer in a Television Series in the 55th Golden Bell Awards and a nomination for Best Supporting Actress at the 2nd Asia Contents Awards. In the same year, she also took on a main role in the romance series Non Reading Club and a recurring role as Wang Yi-rong in the legal drama series Wacko At Law. Lee starred alongside Austin Lin in the 2021 film Terrorizers, for which she was nominated for Best Newcomer at the 58th Golden Horse Awards. She also made cameo appearances in the television series We Best Love and Rainless Love in a Godless Land that same year.

In 2022, Lee played Hsiang Wei-hsin, the lead character in the novel-adapted romance film My Best Friend's Breakfast, for which she was nominated for Best New Talent in the 24th Taipei Film Awards. She secured a main role in the mystery series The Leaking Bookstore, and appeared as the younger version of Cheryl Yang's character in a cameo in the 2023 comedy series Oh No! Here Comes Trouble. In 2024, Lee reprised her role as Chiang Hsiao-meng in the second season of The Victims' Game, for which she was nominated for Best Supporting Actress in the 6th Asian Content Awards, and landed a lead role in the romance film I Am the Secret in Your Heart, starring alongside Tsao Yu-ning and Shou Lo.

== Filmography ==
=== Film ===
Year	Title	Role	Notes/Ref.
2019	Detention	Chou Hsin (周欣)	
2021	Terrorizers	Chen Yu-fang (陳玉芳)	
2022	My Best Friend's Breakfast	Hsiang Wei-hsin (項微心)	
2024	I Am the Secret in Your Heart	Wang Hsiao-hsia (王曉夏)	
2026	Arrested Memory	Hua (華)	

=== Television ===
Year	Title	Role	Notes/Ref.
2018	On Children	Shih Yu-jie (施宇婕)	Guest role
2020	Monstrous Me	The Earth Cattle (地牛)	Guest role
2020–2024	The Victims' Game	Chiang Hsiao-meng (江曉孟)	Main role (season 1–2)
2020	Non Reading Club	Yan Wu-an (言午安)	Main role
2020–2021	Wacko At Law	Wang Yi-rong (王苡融)	Recurring role
2021	We Best Love	Drama Club senior	Cameo
2021	Rainless Love in a Godless Land	Molengaw	Special appearance
2022	The Leaking Bookstore	Lin Mu-qing (林穆青)	Main role
2023	Oh No! Here Comes Trouble	Young Ye Bao-sheng (葉寶生)	Cameo
2023	What the Hell Is Love	Chou Qing (周晴)	Main role
2024	Urban Horror	Hsiao-qi (小琪)	Main role
2025	Had I Not Seen the Sun	Chiang Hsiao-tung (江曉彤)	Main role

== Awards and nominations ==
Year	Award	Category	Work	Result	Ref.
2020	55th Golden Bell Awards	Best Newcomer in a Television Series	The Victims' Game	Won	
2020	2nd Asia Contents Awards	Best Newcomer Actress	The Victims' Game	Nominated	
2020	3rd Asian Academy Creative Awards	Best Actress in a Supporting Role	The Victims' Game	Nominated	
2021	58th Golden Horse Awards	Best New Performer	Terrorizers	Nominated	
2022	24th Taipei Film Awards	Best New Talent	My Best Friend's Breakfast	Nominated	
2024	6th Asia Contents Awards & Global OTT Awards	Best Supporting Actress	The Victims' Game	Nominated	
