= Oh No! Here Comes Trouble =

Taiwanese television series

Chinese name
- Traditional Chinese: 不良執念清除師
- Simplified Chinese: 不良执念清除师
Transcriptions
Standard Mandarin
- Hanyu Pinyin: Bùliáng zhíniàn qīngchú shī
- Genre: Drama; Comedy; Fantasy
- Written by: Lin Kuan-hui
- Directed by: Lin Kuan-hui
- Starring: Tseng Jing-hua; Vivian Sung; Cheryl Yang; Peng Cian-You; Yao Chun-yao; Joanne Missingham; Chanon Santinatornkul
- Country of origin: Taiwan
- Original language: Mandarin
- No. of seasons: 1
- No. of episodes: 12

Production
- Executive producer: Yang Xiang-hua
- Producers: Xu Qing-wan; Xu Guo-lun

Original release
- Network: GTV and iQIYI
- Release: 15 April 2023 – May 27, 2023

Oh No! Here Comes Trouble (traditional Chinese: 不良執念清除師; simplified Chinese: 不良执念清除师) is a 2023 original Taiwanese television series written and directed by Lin Kuan-hui. The series stars Tseng Jing-hua, Vivian Sung, Cheryl Yang, Peng Cian-You, Joanne Missingham, Chanon Santinatornkul and Yao Chun-yao. The series first aired on GTV and iQIYI on April 15, 2023.

== Synopsis ==
The story follows high school student Pu Yi-Yong who gains supernatural powers after waking up from a coma that was caused by a near-fatal car accident. He embarks on a fantastical journey with rookie policewoman Chen Chu-Ying and school rival Cao Guang-Yan.

== Cast ==
=== Main starring ===
- Tseng Jing-hua as Pu Yi-Yong
- Vivian Sung as Chen Chu-Ying, rookie policewoman
- Peng Cian-You as Cao Guang Yan, Pu Yi-Yong's school rival

=== Support roles ===
- Cheryl Yang as Ye Bao Sheng, Pu Yi-Yong's mother
  - Moon Lee as Young Ye Bao Sheng
- Hou Yan Xi as Cui Zhao Wan
- Sun Qing as Pu Zhan Kui
- Bobby Dou as Pu Ren Xiu, Pu Yi-Yong's father
- Mario Pu as Cao Guang-Yan's father
- Vince Kao as Pu Zhan Kui [Young]
- Yao Chun-yao as Zheng Li Song
- Fandy Fan as Lin Yong Chuan
- Joanne Missingham as Lady of the tattoo
- Joe Cheng as Yu Zhen Yuan
- Rexen Cheng as the Stone God
- Chung Hsin-ling as He Shou Tang
- Sphinx Ting as Xie Hui
- Da-her Lin as Lu Qun
- Chi Chin as Lin Jing Mei
- Derek Chang as Zhuang He Zhen
- Chanon Santinatornkul as Yang Ning
