= Chinese ghost marriage =

Marriage in Chinese tradition in which one or both parties are deceased

- Chinese: 冥婚
- Literal meaning: "netherworld marriage"
Transcriptions
Standard Mandarin
- Hanyu Pinyin: mínghūn
- IPA: [mǐŋ.xwə́n]
Yue: Cantonese
- Yale Romanization: mìhng-fān
- Jyutping: ming^{4}-fan^{1}
- IPA: [mɪŋ˩.fɐn˥]
Southern Min
- Tâi-lô: bîng-hun
Middle Chinese
- Middle Chinese: meng xwon

In Chinese tradition, a ghost marriage (Chinese: 冥婚; pinyin: mínghūn; lit. 'spirit marriage') refers to a marriage in which one or both parties are deceased.

The practice can be traced back to the Han dynasty (206 BC–220 AD), with its participants being wealthy. Its origins stem from the yin and yang philosophy, where the yin has to merge with the yang in order to achieve harmony; and the philosophy of life after death. It was believed that if a person had died unmarried, their spirit would feel lonely in the afterlife. As these spirits are unable to find harmony, they would return to cause harm to living family members and their descendants. Due to this belief, living family members would seek out deceased individuals of the opposite sex to accompany the deceased during burial.

Today, many consider the real purpose of ghost marriages to be the appeasement of the minds of the living. It is a form of bereavement therapy practiced in ancient times that is kept alive by various Chinese communities today. Despite its long history and unique practices, the original purposes of ghost marriages remain largely unknown. Ghost marriages are often stigmatized and surrounded with superstitions.

China's existing laws do not explicitly and directly prohibit the custom of ghost marriages. They only intervene if other illegal and criminal activities result from ghost marriages, including the theft of women's corpses and the intentional killing of women for profit.

== Overview ==
=== Reasons ===
For women in traditional Chinese culture, ghost marriages are often performed as it is considered shameful to be parents of an unwed daughter, with unmarried girls often being shunned from society. For men, ghost marriages are performed for the sake of progeny, as they allow the family's lineage to carry on. The idea is that the spouse of a deceased man could adopt a child, who would then carry on the lineage of the man's family. Other reasons for performing ghost marriages for deceased men include the family members of the deceased experiencing dreams or séances from the spirits of the men who have reportedly expressed their desire to be married. Additionally, according to certain Chinese traditions, there exists a saying where a younger brother should not be married before their older brothers, therefore, ghost marriages may be performed to stay in line with this tradition.

=== Arrangement ===
In some occasions, the family of a deceased person may choose to use a priest as a matchmaker. In other occasions, the family may choose to leave out a red envelope with gifts, believing that the deceased person's spouse would eventually reveal themselves.

Sometimes, when the fiancé of a woman dies and she is to engage in a ghost marriage, her participation in the man's funeral service would often involve mourning rituals, taking a vow of celibacy, and soon thereafter, taking up residence with the man's family. The opposite rituals involving the ghost marriage of a man with a deceased fiancée however, remains rather unknown due to a lack of records regarding the matter.

=== Performance ===
Ghost marriages are relatively similar to weddings and funerals, whereby the participants' families will often exchange gifts such as cakes, clothes, and money, in varying sizes.

Effigies made of bamboo, colored paper, or cloth are used to represent the deceased person(s), and are typically clothed in Chinese bridal wear and groomswear, which are later burned. Most of the marriage rites involved in such proceedings are performed the same way regular Chinese marriages are usually performed.

=== Theft of female corpses ===
The practice of ghost marriages have led to female corpses being stolen. Between 2017 and 2019, it was reported that a black market of female corpses had surfaced in the provinces of Shandong, Shanxi and Shaanxi. A female dead body is said to have a price of several hundred thousand renminbi for the purposes of a ghost marriage. Corpses of married, elderly women have also become targeted for such illegal trade. In 2019, several graveyards in Henan installed CCTV cameras and concrete coffins.

== Types ==
Chinese ghost marriages are typically arranged by the family members of the deceased and are performed for a number of reasons, such as to marry an engaged couple after one or both party(s) death, to integrate an unmarried daughter into a patrilineage, to ensure the continuation of the family line, or to wed unmarried, deceased older brothers before their younger brothers.

=== Previously engaged ===
Upon the death of her fiancé, a bride could choose to continue on with the wedding. In such cases, the groom would be represented by a white cockerel at the ceremony. Some women are hesitant about such proceedings as these forms of ghost marriages would require them to participate in funeral rituals, mourning customs (that entail a strict dress code and standards of conduct), taking a vow of celibacy, and to immediately take up residence with the deceased groom's family.

A groom also has the option of marrying his late fiancée, with no disadvantages posed to himself as he would be free to marry again in the future, but there has been a lack of records surrounding such weddings.

=== Women and ghost marriages ===
==== Providing deceased daughters with a patrilineage ====
In many Chinese households, an altar is often prominently displayed with the spirit tablets of paternal ancestors and images of gods. The tablet of a married woman is kept at the altar of her husband's family. Should a woman of an eligible age pass away unmarried, her family would be prohibited from placing her tablet on the altar of her natal home. They instead obtain a temporary paper tablet for her that would be placed in a corner near the door. Due to this, a deceased and unmarried woman is said to have no descendants that would worship her or care for her as part of their lineage. Many Chinese parents therefore assume the important duty of marrying their children off, especially their daughters who are only able to acquire membership in descent lines through marriage. Also for these reasons, ghost marriages are seen as a solution in ensuring that unmarried, deceased daughters could still be connected to a male descent line and be appropriately cared for after death.

Another death custom concerning an unmarried daughter prohibits her from dying in her natal home. Instead, temples or "Death Houses" for spinsters were built. Some families also choose to take their daughters to sheds, empty houses, or outlying buildings to die.

==== Living, unmarried daughters ====
In Chinese culture, an unmarried daughter is a source of great embarrassment and concern. Charlotte Ikels reports that, "Traditionally, girls who did not marry were regarded as a threat to the entire family and were not allowed to continue living at home. Even in contemporary Hong Kong, it is believed unmarried women are assumed to have psychological problems. Presumably no normal person would remain unmarried voluntarily." For girls who choose to remain unmarried, engaging in a "bride-initiated spirit marriage" (or a ghost marriage initiated by a living bride) is seen as a successful "marriage-resistance practice" as it allowed them to remain single and still be integrated into a lineage. This can evoke negative reactions such as having the ghost marriage called a "fake spirit-marriage", being referred to as someone "marrying a spirit tablet", or simply being seen as someone attempting to avoid marriage.

=== Continuing the family line ===
If a son dies before he is married, his parents may choose to arrange a ghost marriage in order to allow him his own descendants. As put by James Dyer, "A man in China does not marry so much for his own benefit as for that of the family: to continue the family name; to provide descendants to keep up the ancestral worship; and to give a daughter-in-law to his mother to wait on her and be, in general, a daughter to her." The ceremony itself has the characteristics of both a marriage and a funeral, with the spirit of the deceased bride being "led" by a medium or priest, while her body is transferred from her grave to be laid next to her husband. At times, a living woman may be taken as a wife for a deceased, unmarried man, but this is rare.

If a family were "suitably rich to tempt a [living] girl," a ghost marriage might profit them with a daughter-in-law. As a daughter is not considered "a potential contributor to the lineage into which she is born," but rather "is expected [to] give the children she bears and her adult labor to the family of her husband," the wife of a deceased son would benefit her husband's family by becoming a caregiver in their home. Upon providing the deceased son with a wife, the family could then also adopt an heir, or a "grandson", who would continue on the family line.

As daughters-in-law married through ghost marriages are expected to live a chaste life, their purpose is to become a "social instrument" that would enable the husband's family to adopt. Such families would often prefer to adopt patrilineally related male kins, usually through a brother who would assign one of his own sons to the lineage of the deceased. The adoption would be carried out through a written contract which would then be placed under the dead man's tablet. Following this, the adopted son would be expected to make ancestral offerings on his birth and death dates, and is additionally "entitled to inherit his foster father's share of the family estate."

=== Requests from the afterworld ===
Ghost marriages are often arranged at the "request" of the deceased spirits, who upon "finding itself without a spouse in the other world," causes misfortune for its family, the family of its betrothed, or the family of the deceased's married sisters. "This usually takes the form of sickness by one or more family members. When the sickness is not cured by ordinary means, the family turns to divination and learns of the plight of the ghost through a séance."

More benignly, a spirit may appear to a family member in a dream and request a spouse.

=== Other instances of ghost marriage ===
As Chinese customs dictate that a younger brother should not be married before their older brothers, a ghost marriage for an older, deceased brother may be arranged just before a younger brother's wedding to avoid "incurring the disfavor of his brother's ghost."

In the early days of immigration, ghost marriages were said to have been used to "cement a bond of friendship between two families"; no recent cases of such have been reported.

== Arrangement ==
If a family wishes to arrange a ghost marriage, they may consult with a matchmaker of sorts. Others do not use the aid of priests or diviners, believing that the groom the ghost-bride has chosen would "somehow identify himself." Some families lay a red envelope as bait in the middle of the road and hide. When the envelope is picked up by a passerby, the family reveals themselves and announce that the passerby is the chosen bride or groom.

=== Dowries and bridewealth ===
The exchange of bridewealth and dowries between the families involved in a ghost marriage varies. Some families may exchange both, while others may simply gift red envelopes. While there are no standards in the amount exchanged, several of Janice Stockard's informants have reported instances whereby the groom's family had provided the bride with a house. In another report, the groom's family sent wedding cakes and NT$120 to the bride's family, who then returned it with a dowry of a gold ring, a gold necklace, several pairs of shoes, and six dresses, "all fitted for the use of the groom's living wife."

=== Rites ===
In a ghost marriage, many typical marriage rites are observed. The deceased are often represented by effigies made of paper, bamboo, or cloth.

For instance, to represent the ghost couple at their marriage feast, the bride and groom may be constructed of paper bodies over a bamboo frame with a papier-mâché head. Respective paper servants would stand on either side of them, and the room would contain many paper effigies of products that would be used in their home, such as a dressing table (complete with a mirror), a table with six stools, a money safe, a refrigerator, and trunks of paper clothes and cloth. After the ceremony, the paper belongings are burned to be sent to the spirit world for use by the couple.

In a separate ceremony that married a living groom to a ghost bride, her effigy had been constructed with a wooden backbone, arms made from newspaper, and a head of "a smiling young girl clipped from a wall calendar." Similarly, after the marriage festivities, the effigy is burned.

In both cases, the effigies wore real clothing, similar to what is typically worn in marriage ceremonies. These often include a pair of trousers, a white shirt, a red dress, and an outer lace dress. If a living groom were to marry ghost bride, he would wear black gloves instead of the typical white. Additionally, the effigies were often adorned with bridal jewellery, none of which were made of real gold.

Most of the marriage ceremony and rites performed during a ghost marriage remains true to Chinese customs. The deceased bride is treated as if she were still living and participating in such proceedings. She would be 'fed' at the wedding feast in the morning, be 'invited' in and out of the cab, and have her 'arrival' announced at the groom's house. One observable difference in a ghost marriage is that the ancestral tablet of the deceased would be placed inside the effigy, so that "the bride's dummy [is] animated with the ghost that [is] to be married". At the end of the ceremony, the tablet is placed with the other tablets of the groom's family.

== Popular culture ==
Writer Yangsze Choo's 2013 novel, The Ghost Bride, used the principles of ghost marriages as its central premise. It was a New York Times best-seller. It later formed the basis of the Netflix-original series, The Ghost Bride.

The Filipino film The Ghost Bride (2017) incorporates ghost marriage into its plot and introduces a fictional character as the antagonist in relation to this tradition.

The film Marry My Dead Body (2023) features a ghost marriage as its main plot.
