= My Best Friend's Breakfast =

2022 Taiwanese film by Ryan Tu

- Promotional poster
- Traditional Chinese: 我吃了那男孩一整年的早餐
- Simplified Chinese: 我吃了那男孩一整年的早餐
- Literal meaning: "I ate that boy's breakfast for an entire year"
- Hanyu Pinyin: Wǒ chī le nà nánhái yī zhěngnián de zǎocān
- Directed by: Ryan Tu
- Screenplay by: Ryan Tu
- Based on: My Best Friend’s Breakfast by Misa
- Starring: Moon Lee; Eric Chou
- Cinematography: Tseng Hsien-chung
- Edited by: Gu Hsiao-yun
- Music by: Chris Hou; Eric Chou
- Production companies: Skyfilms Entertainment; Skyline Entertainment
- Release date: January 28, 2022
- Running time: 119 minutes
- Country: Taiwan
- Languages: Mandarin; Taiwanese
- Box office: NT$73.9 million

My Best Friend's Breakfast (Chinese: 我吃了那男孩一整年的早餐) is a 2022 Taiwanese romantic comedy film written and directed by Ryan Tu in his directorial debut. The film stars Moon Lee and Eric Chou, and is based on a bestselling novel by Misa which has been published in many languages. The novel, in turn, was inspired by a shared story that first appeared on social media platform Dcard in 2015. The film was released in theaters on January 28, 2022.

== Cast ==
- Moon Lee as Xiang Wei-xin
- Eric Chou as Tao You-quan
- Edison Song as Chang Yuan-shuo
- Jean Ho as Fang Qi-ran
- Lou Jun-shuo as Guan Hao-wei
- Da-her Lin as Tang Zhong-xian
- Ko Cheng as He Bao-long
- Hung Yu-ching as Ye Ke-ya
- Chen Shu-fang as Grandma
- Sara Yu as Mom
- Patty Lee as Older Xiang Wei-xin
- Austin Lin as Older Tao You-quan
- Darren Chiu as Xiang Yi-da
- Esther Liu as Sun Li-qing
- Alex Chou as Class union president
- Beatrice Fang as Food outlet owner
- Bella Wu as Young Xiang Wei-xin
- Andy Chen as Swimming teammate
- Aaron Hong as Noodle store customer

== Reception ==
James Marsh of South China Morning Post gave the film 2 out of 5 stars and described it as a "high-school romcom populated by awkward, inarticulate teens and stuffed with misunderstandings and misconceptions that could be remedied by a single conversation", and which "has very limited appeal" and "only young fans of its fresh-faced cast are likely to enjoy [the film]".

== Awards and nominations ==
Awards	Category	Recipient	Result	Ref.
Taipei Film Awards	Best New Talent	Moon Lee	Nominated	
59th Golden Horse Awards	Best New Performer	Eric Chou	Nominated	
59th Golden Horse Awards	Best Adapted Screenplay	Ryan Tu	Nominated	
59th Golden Horse Awards	Best Original Film Song	What's on Your Mind"; Composer: Eric Chou; Lyrics: Eric Chou and Wu I-wei; Performer: Eric Chou	Won	
59th Golden Horse Awards	FIPRESCI Prize	My Best Friend's Breakfast	Nominated	
