= Ho Wi-ding =

Taiwanese filmmaker

Ho Wi-ding 何蔚庭
- Born: Muar, Malaysia
- Education: Bachelor of Film Production
- Alma mater: New York University
- Occupation: Film director
- Years active: 2005–present
- Spouse: Hu Chih-hsin

Ho Wi-ding is a Malaysia-born Taiwanese filmmaker.

== Life and career ==
Ho was born in Malaysia of Chinese ethnic background, and he graduated from Tisch School of the Arts at New York University. In 2001, he moved to Taipei where his sister lived in, and started working on commercials and shorts. He finished his feature debut Pinoy Sunday in 2010, winning him the Best New Director Award at 47th Golden Horse Awards.

His third feature Cities of Last Things had its world premiere at the 2018 Toronto International Film Festival, and was awarded the Platform Prize.

The short film Respire won two awards at the 2005 Cannes Film Festival Critics' Week, becoming the first Taiwanese short film to win an award at Cannes. It also won "Best Fantasy Short Film" at the Catalan International Fantastic Film Festival in Spain and a Special Jury Prize at the Taipei Film Awards. Another short film, Summer Afternoon, was nominated for the 2008 Cannes Film Festival Directors' Fortnight.

Ho married Taiwanese film director Hu Chih-hsin. The pair co-directed Terrorizers.

== Filmography ==
=== Feature films ===
- Still (1998)
- Respire (2005)
- Summer Afternoon (2008)
- Pinoy Sunday (2010)
- When Yesterday Comes - I Wake Up In A Strange Bed (2012)
- Beautiful Accident (2017)
- Cities of Last Things (2018)
- Look at Me (2019)
- Terrorizers (2021)
- Memory Inc. (2022)
- Mothernet (2025)

=== Telefilms ===
- My Elder Brother in Taiwan (2012)
- The Biggest Toad in the Puddle (2015)
