= Kenny Khoo =

Singaporean singer and songwriter

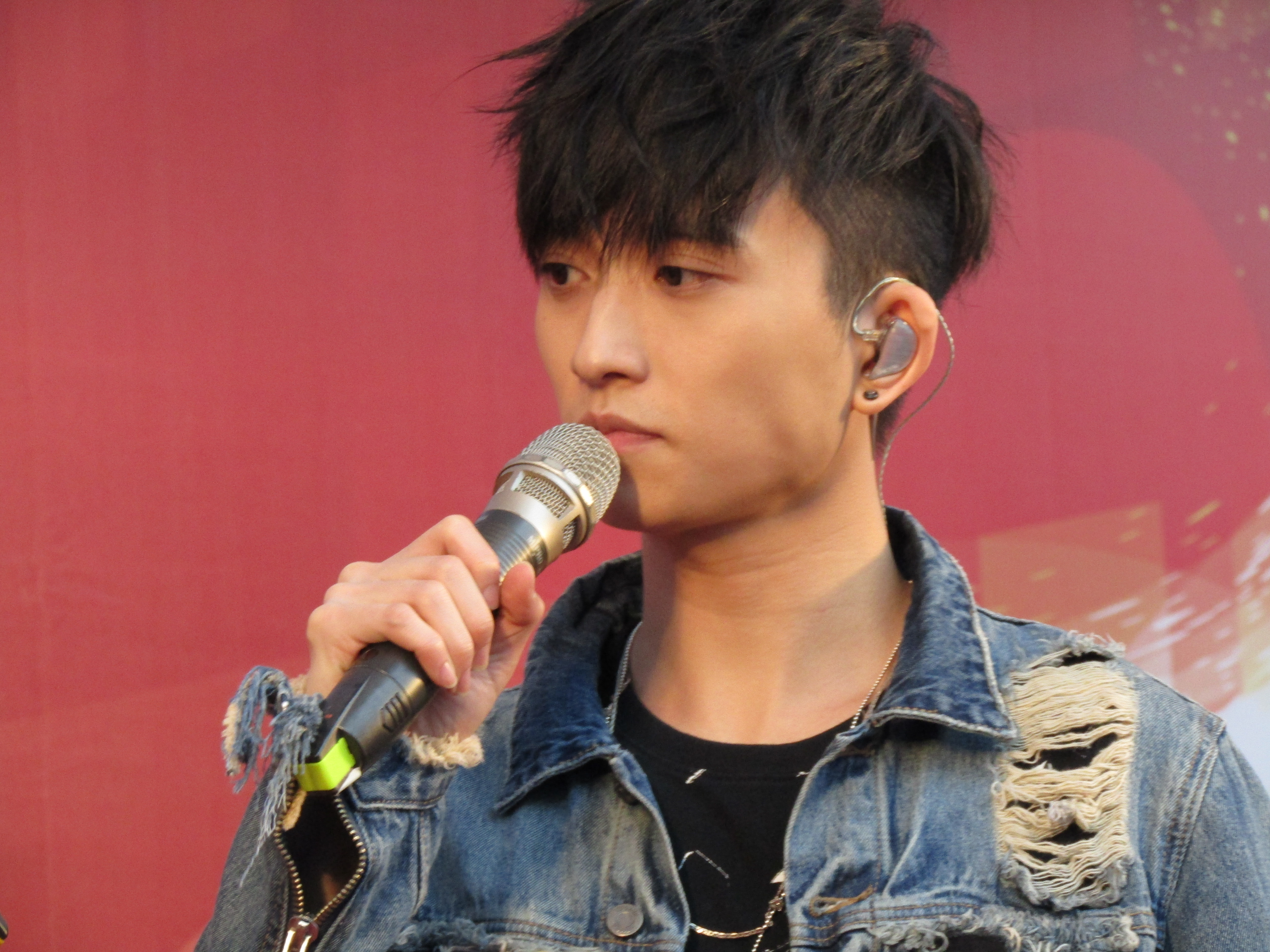
- Khoo in 2017
- Born: Singapore
- Other name: Qiu Feng Ze
- Education: Ai Tong School; Hougang Secondary School; SIM University
- Alma mater: Republic Polytechnic
- Occupations: Singer; songwriter; host; businessman
- Years active: 2014−present
- Musical career
- Genres: Pop; rock
- Instruments: Vocals; guitar; piano
- Label: Reason Entertainment
- Member of: W0LF(S)

Stage name
- Traditional Chinese: 邱鋒澤
- Simplified Chinese: 邱锋泽
- Hanyu Pinyin: Qiū Fēngzé

Birth name
- Traditional Chinese: 邱殷龍
- Simplified Chinese: 邱殷龙
- Hanyu Pinyin: Qiū Yīnlóng
- Website: Reason Entertainment

Kenny Khoo is a Singaporean singer, songwriter, television host and businessman. Khoo gained popularity after appearing in a role-playing game on the Taiwanese variety show 100% Entertainment in 2019.

== Early life ==
Khoo has a younger brother.

He attended Ai Tong School and Hougang Secondary School, and obtained a diploma from Republic Polytechnic. At one point, he studied at SIM University.

== Career ==
In 2012, Khoo auditioned and became one of the 12 participants in the singing competition Guinness Live! which was conducted in front of live audiences in various clubs. His performances caught the attention of director Chai Yee Wei which led him to be cast as one of the 4 lead roles in the Singapore music movie That Girl in Pinafore in 2013.

He later studied songwriting at Funkie Monkies music school under Singaporean music veterans Eric Ng and Xiaohan.

In 2014, Khoo released his debut album Ten Storeys which shot to the No. 1 spot on Taiwan's G-Music sales charts a month after its release in April. He released his second album Is Anyone Out There in 2016.

In 2017, he was cast in television drama Rock Soulmate and released a single titled Signal with fellow castmate and singer Wayne Huang.

In 2018, he set up his own company Reason Brothers with Singaporean music producer Cheong Waii Hoong to produce his own music.

In 2019, Khoo shot to fame after participating in the Werewolf role-playing game on Taiwanese variety show 100% Entertainment. He released his third album Prophet on his 31st birthday in October. In November 2019, he collaborated with fellow game participants singers Nine Chen, Wayne Huang and Lai Yan-ju to form the group W0LF四坚情 and they released the song Betrayal.

In March 2020, Khoo joined 100% Entertainment as a fixed host. He released Modern Love as part of W0LF四坚情 in April 2020.

In July 2020, W0LF四坚情 expanded to include another fellow game participant and rapper Shou Lou. They became known as W0LF(S)五坚情 and released their first single as five, All Day, the same month.

In October 2020, W0LF(S)五坚情 released their second single 反正我好看 in collaboration with Samsung for the Samsung Galaxy S20 FE 5G.

In August 2022, Khoo left 100% Entertainment, citing health reasons.

== Ventures ==
In late 2017, Khoo and Zhang Weihong, a music producer and friend from Singapore, founded music production, video creation and record company Reason Brothers Ltd.

On 1 November 2020, he started the personal clothing company Feng Me. Its brand creation concept is "Be you, wherever you are"

In 2022, Khoo and his father founded Merchandise Store F47, a memorabilia pieces business.

== Discography ==
=== Studio albums ===
- Ten Storeys (Apr 2014)
- Is Anyone Out There (有人在嗎, lit. 'Is anyone there') (Oct 2016)
- Prophet (預言家) (Oct 2019)
- Eclipse (日環食) (Jan 2021)
- DEEP AWAKENING (見過深淵的人) (Dec 2022)
- COIOR Free (Oct 2024)
- Lines (Nov 2025)

=== EP ===
- DREAM WALKERS (夜遊所夢) (Nov 2026)

=== Singles ===
- Werewolves (天黑請閉眼, lit. 'It's nighttime, please close [your] eyes') (May 2019)
- Daylight (天亮請睜眼, lit. 'It's daytime, please open [your] eyes') (Aug 2019)

== Filmography ==
=== Television series ===
- Your Majesty (2016)
- Rock Soulmate (2018)

=== Film ===
- That Girl in Pinafore (2013)
- Love Shake (2014)
