= The Soul (film) =

- Film poster
- Traditional Chinese: 緝魂
- Hanyu Pinyin: Jī Hún
- Directed by: Cheng Wei-hao
- Screenplay by: Cheng Wei-hao, Veronica Jin, Chen Yen-chi (陈彦齐)
- Based on: Yihun Youshu by Jiang Bo
- Produced by: Veronica Jin, Bernard Yang (楊庭愷)
- Starring: Chang Chen; Janine Chang; Sun Anke; Christopher Lee
- Cinematography: Kartik Vijay
- Edited by: Shieh Meng-ju
- Music by: Luming Lu
- Production companies: TMZ Media 霍尔果斯众合千澄影业有限公司; Rise Pictures; Pon Pon Pictures
- Distributed by: QC Media; Taopiaopiao; China Film Co., Ltd. Vie Vision Pictures
- Release dates: 15 January 2021 (mainland China); 29 January 2021 (Taiwan)
- Running time: 124 minutes (mainland China); 130 minutes (Taiwan)
- Countries: China; Taiwan
- Language: Standard Chinese
- Budget: TWD160 million

The Soul (simplified Chinese: 缉魂; traditional Chinese: 緝魂; pinyin: Jī Hún) is a Chinese-Taiwanese tech noir mystery crime film based on Jiang Bo's (江波) novel Yihun Youshu (移魂有术). It is directed by Cheng Wei-hao and stars Chang Chen, Janine Chang, Sun Anke, and Christopher Lee.

== Plot ==
The film begins with the brutal murder of CEO Wang Shi-tsung, who developed futuristic cancer treatments. His wife, Li Yen, is found holding the murder weapon. Detective Ah-Bao and her prosecutor husband, Liang Wen-chao, are assigned to the investigation. Liang is battling cancer, and the couple is advised to consider RNA restoration technology.

Li Yen claims Wang's son, Tian-you, committed the murder in a ritualistic manner. The maid recalls Tian-you running out of the house that night and said that Tian-you blamed Wang for his mother's suicide. The police discover that Wang Shi-tsung had disinherited his son, leaving Li Yen and Dr. Wan Yu-fan, the CEO of Wang's corporation, as beneficiaries. Liang learned that Wan and Tang (Wang's first wife) had a past affair. They learn that Wang had brain cancer and was using RNA technology to extend his life. Wang wanted to father another child with Li Yen. Surveillance reveals Li Yen experiencing epileptic fits and hallucinations involving Wang's first wife, Tang Su-zhen, who had cursed Wang before her suicide.

Liang confronts Dr. Wan, suggesting that Dr. Wan wanted to transfer Tang's brain cells to Li Yen and resurrect his lover in Li Yen. Wan denies all of this. Meanwhile, Wang Tian-you is arrested, and when confronted with Li Yen, she seemingly channels Tang, thanking Tian-you for the murder.

Liang has an epileptic episode, learns his cancer has spread, and discovers his wife tampered with evidence for his RNA treatment. Ah Bao removed a portion of an audio in which Li Yen confronts a dying Wang to hand over the CEO position. Li Yen, now CEO, is confronted by Liang, who believes she manipulated Tian-you to commit the murder. Dr. Wan visits Liang and confesses that, since their youth, he and Wang were lovers. Wang married Tang Su-chen, a leading researcher for appearances. Wang was cold to Tang, and this led to her depression and her turning to Dr. Wan for support. Wang comes up with an idea that would allow him to live as a woman using the RNA research. Tang commits suicide when she learns the truth about Wang and Dr. Wan. Wang develops cancer, and Dr. Wan tricks Li Yen into allowing Wang's brain to be transferred to her. However, the procedure started making Li Yen paranoid. Dr. Wan tries to euthanize Li Yen but she manages to escape. Dr. Wan wants Liang to bring Li Yen down, but Liang refuses, believing it would also bring down his wife.

Liang goes to speak to Li Yen asking whether she ever loved Dr. Wan. Dr. Wan runs into the room and you can hear him spraying Li Yen.

Li Yen gives up her stocks and pleads guilty. Dr. Wan commits suicide. Liang takes responsibility for hiding the audio evidence and eventually dies. Ah-Bao visits Li Yen in prison, showing her the baby. Li Yen makes a smiling gesture that Liang used to do with her fingers [hinting that its Liang inside her]

== Cast ==
- Chang Chen as Liang Wen-chao
- Janine Chang as Ah-Bao
- Sun Anke as Li Yen
- Christopher Lee as Doctor Wan Yufan
- Baijia Zhang as Tang Su-zhen
- Erek Lin as Wang Tian-you
- Samuel Ku as Wang Shi-cong
- Lü Hsueh-feng as Zhang
- Daniel Chang (張哲豪) as Liang

== Production ==
Director Cheng Wei-hao asked male lead Chang Chen to lose 10 kilograms and shave his head for his role as cancer patient Liang Wenchao. Chang lost 12 kg within three months. Janine Chang changed her hairstyle for the film, cutting her hair short for her role as a police officer. In preparation for filming, Cheng Wei-hao and Janine Chang visited police stations to talk to female officers about their work and observe police officers' uniforms and behavior on the job.

The film began shooting on 20 November 2019, and began post-production in early 2020.

Six minutes of the film were cut from the mainland Chinese version due to censorship, mainly of violence.

== Soundtrack ==
No.	Title	Lyrics	Music	Performed By	Length
1.	"No Bitterness 不苦" (theme song)	Cheng Weihao	Peggy Hsu	Wu Qing-feng	6:12
2.	"Ambition 野心" (promotional song)	Joker Xue	Joker Xue	Joker Xue	3:37

== Release ==
The Soul was released in mainland China on 15 January 2021, and grossed RMB111 million.

The film was released on 29 January 2021, in Taiwan and grossed TWD50.9 million.

The film was released internationally for streaming on Netflix, on 14 April 2021.

== Reception ==
On Douban, The Soul initially reached an average rating of 7.3 out of 10, which fell to 7.1 soon after its release. It received an average score of 8.0 on Maoyan and 8.1 on Taopiaopiao.

Critic Sean Aversa praised the film for its intricate and unpredictable plot, saying that it was "exceptionally well written" and the cast's performance was excellent. Decider called it "a dark, dense film that’ll reward attentive viewers and turn away those looking for light entertainment", while Han Cheung of the Taipei Times lauded its "suspenseful, nuanced storytelling". Jiang Bo, author of the original novel, said that the adaptation was extremely successful.

On the other hand, Derek Elley panned the film, calling it "relentlessly downbeat" and described the plot as "convoluted and outrageous".

== See also ==
- Cinema of Taiwan
- List of Taiwanese films
