= Austin Lin =

Taiwanese actor and singer

- 林柏宏
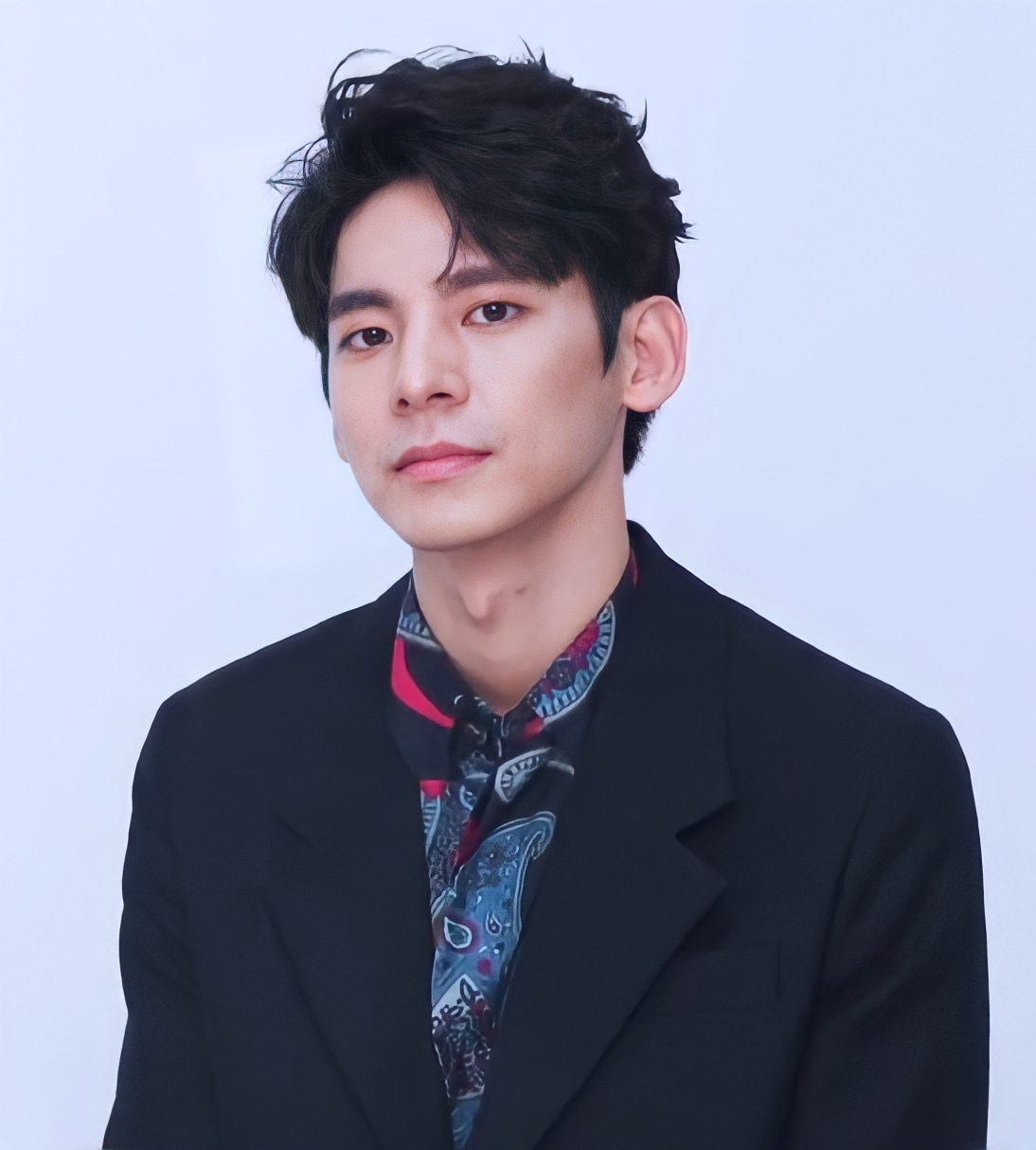
- Lin in 2020
- Born: 27 January 1988 (age 38); Taipei, Taiwan
- Education: National Taiwan Normal University (BA)
- Occupations: Actor; singer; television host
- Years active: 2007–present
- Agent: CHOU'S Entertainment Ltd.
- Awards: Golden Horse Awards – Best Supporting Actor; 2016 At Cafe 6 – Xiao Bozhi

Chinese name
- Chinese: 林柏宏
- Hanyu Pinyin: Lín Bóhóng
- Hokkien POJ: Lîm Pek-hông

Austin Lin (Chinese: 林柏宏; Pe̍h-ōe-jī: Lîm Pek-hông, born January 27, 1988) is a Taiwanese actor, singer and television host. Born and raised in Taipei, Taiwan, he took part in the second season of Taiwanese singing competition, One Million Star, in 2007. In 2009, he made his acting debut in Taiwanese film, Somewhere I Have Never Traveled, for which he also sang on the soundtrack. In 2016, he appeared in Taiwanese film, At Cafe 6, and won a Golden Horse Award for Best Supporting Actor.

== Filmography ==
=== Feature films ===
- Somewhere I Have Never Traveled (2009)
- Leaving Gracefully (2011)
- Sweet Alibis (2014)
- Anywhere Somewhere Nowhere (2014)
- Endless Nights in Aurora (2014)
- The Missing Piece (2015)
- Go Lala Go 2 (2015)
- At Cafe 6 (2016)
- Interference Notes (2017)
- To My 19-Year-Old (2017)
- Someone in the Clouds (2019)
- The Knight of Shadows: Between Yin and Yang (2019)
- Wings Over Everest (2019)
- Somewhere Winter (2019)
- I WeirDo (2020)
- Terrorizers (2021)
- My Best Friend's Breakfast (2022)
- Marry My Dead Body (2023)
- Salli (2024)
- 96 Minutes (2025) as Sung Kang-jen
- Tristes Tropiques (2025)

=== Television series ===
- Rice Family (2010)
- Shiningstar (2011)
- The Soldiers (2011)
- Lady Maid Maid (2012)
- Home (2012)
- An Innocent Mistake (2012)
- The Pursuit of Happiness (2013)
- The Kindaichi Case Files (2014)
- The Best of Youth (2015)
- Rock Records in Love (2016)
- I Will Never Let You Go (2017)
- Unexpected (2018)
- Legend of Huabuqi (2019)
- Tears on Fire (2021)
- Light the Night (2021)
- Mom, Don't Do That! (2022)
- At the Moment (2023)

=== Variety shows ===
- Ai's Kitchen (2024)

== Discography ==
=== Soundtrack albums ===
- Somewhere I Have Never Traveled (2009)

== Awards and nominations ==
Year	Award	Category	Nominated work	Result	Ref.
2016	China Movie Channel Media Awards	Most Attractive New Actor	At Cafe 6	Won	
2016	Golden Horse Awards	Best Supporting Actor	At Cafe 6	Won	
2020	Golden Horse Awards	Best Leading Actor	I WeirDo	Nominated	
2022	57th Golden Bell Awards	Best Host in a Reality or Game Show	Three Piglets 3	Won	
2023	Taipei Film Awards	Best Actor	Marry My Dead Body	Nominated	
