= W0LF(S) =

Mandopop pop group

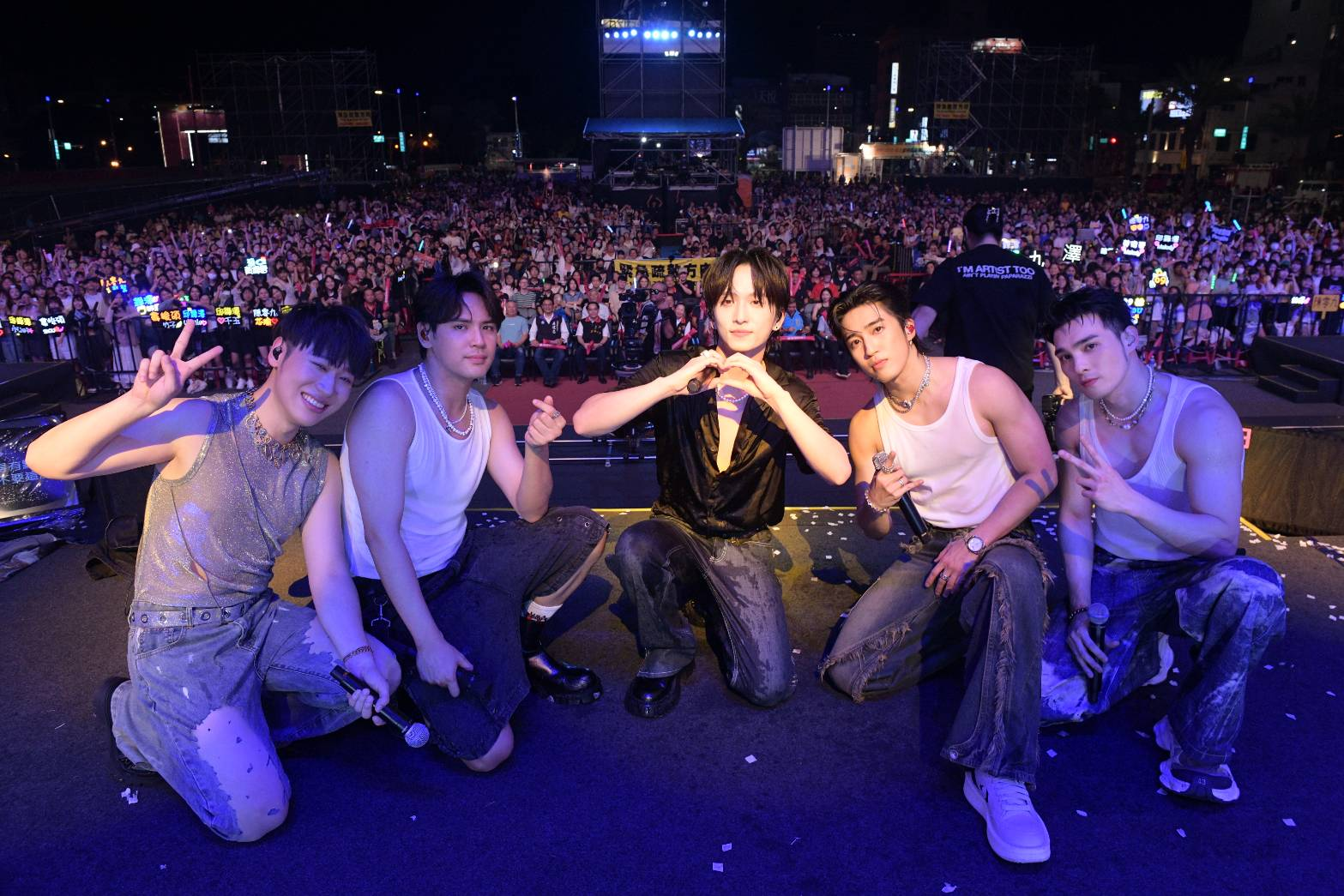
- W0LF(S) at 2024 Hualien Summer Festival

Background information
- Origin: Taiwan
- Genres: Mandopop; Dance-pop
- Years active: 2019—present
- Label: Reason Brothers
- Members: Wayne Huang; Nine Chen; Lai; Qiu Fengze; SHOU

W0LF(S) (Chinese: 五堅情; pinyin: wǔ jiān qíng; formerly W0LF) is a Taiwanese boy band formed in 2019. The band's name is composed of various initials in the members' names.

The band was formed with four singers: Wayne Huang, Nine Chen, Lai and Qiu Fengze. In 2020, the band was renamed after gaining rapper SHOU as the fifth member.

== Members ==
- Wayne Huang (黃偉晉; b. 23 March 1990 in Taipei) – vocalist
- Nine Chen (陳零九; b. 9 April 1987 in Kaohsiung County) – vocalist
- Lai (賴晏駒; b. 16 January 1991 in Taichung County) – vocalist
- Qiu Fengze (邱鋒澤; b. 31 October 1988 in Singapore) – group leader, vocalist
- SHOU (婁峻碩; b. 14 September 1992 in Hualien County) – vocalist, rapper

== History ==
=== 2019: Formation of W0LF ===
On November 6, 2019, during the live broadcast of "100% Entertainment", Qiu Fengze, Nine Chen and Wayne Huang announced that they would form a four-member group with Lai.

The group released their first single Betrayal the same month after the announcement, followed by Modern Love on April 9, 2020.

=== 2020: Renamed to W0LF(S) ===
Following the inclusion of SHOU, the group released their first single titled All Day under the name of W0LF(S).

In October 2020, W0LF(S) released their second single #反正我好看 in partnership with Samsung for the launch of Samsung Galaxy S20 FE 5G in Taiwan.

=== 2021 - Present ===
In May 2021, the band released their third single I Wanna Holiday in partnership with Agoda, followed by a song amid the global COVID-19 pandemic titled No Boundaries in September 2021. They also sang the 5th anniversary theme song for Arena of Valor titled Ride On which was released on 29 October 2021. The group released the title track of their first album - Moon Landing on 1 December 2021.

The group released Be A Liar on 20 January 2022, the launch date of the preorder for their first album. In March 2022, they sang the mandarin theme song for Turning Red , an American fantasy comedy film produced by Pixar Animation Studios and distributed by Walt Disney Studios Motion Pictures. They released LALALA on 14 July 2022 to commemorate their second anniversary.

On 14 October 2022, W0LF(S) held their first overseas concert in Singapore at The Star Theatre.

The members began conceptualising their new Extended play (EP) ROYAL which consisted of 3 songs in July 2023. The EP album was subsequently released on 22 December 2023.

On 16 May 2025, W0LF(S) temporarily announced their hiatus following member Nine Chen's investigation for evading mandatory military service in Taiwan. The team has announced its members will continue on their solo future endeavours.

== Discography ==
=== Extended play (EP) ===
Release Date	Album Title	Album Tracks
December 22, 2023	ROYAL	1. BOOOOOM (立刻要爆炸); 2. Last Love (你是我這輩子最想愛的呀); 3. Sangria

=== Singles ===
Year	Title	Track Information
2019	Betrayal (兵變)	Artist: W0LF 四堅情; Release Date: November 19, 2019; Label: Reason Brothers; Genre: Mandopop
2020	Modern Love (速食愛情)	Artist: W0LF 四堅情; Release Date: April 9, 2020; Label: Reason Brothers; Genre: Mandopop
2020	All Day	Artist: W0LF(S) 五堅情; Release Date: July 14, 2020; Label: Reason Brothers; Genre: Mandopop
2020	#反正我好看 (lit. 'I look good anyway')	Artist: W0LF(S) 五堅情; Release Date: October 16, 2020; Label: Reason Brothers; Genre: Mandopop
2021	I Wanna Holiday	Artist: W0LF(S) 五堅情; Release Date: May 27, 2021; Label: Reason Brothers; Genre: Mandopop
2021	No Boundaries (零距離)	Artist: W0LF(S) 五堅情; Release Date: September 16, 2021; Label: Reason Brothers; Genre: Mandopop
2021	Ride On	Artists: W0LF(S) 五堅情, WaVe; Release Date: October 29, 2021; Label: Arena of Valor, Reason Brothers; Genre: Mandopop
2021	Moon Landing (月面著陸)	Artists: W0LF(S) 五堅情; Release Date: December 1, 2021; Label: Reason Brothers; Genre: Mandopop
2022	Be A Liar	Artists: W0LF(S) 五堅情; Release Date: January 20, 2022; Label: Reason Brothers; Genre: Mandopop
2022	U Know What’s Up (王者的驕傲)	Artists: W0LF(S) 五堅情; Release Date: March 11, 2022; Label: Disney+; Genre: Mandopop
2022	LALALA	Artists: W0LF(S) 五堅情; Release Date: July 14, 2022; Label: Reason Brothers; Genre: Mandopop
2023	Last Love (你是我這輩子最想愛的呀)	Artists: W0LF(S) 五堅情; Release Date: August 31, 2023; Label: Reason Brothers; Genre: Mandopop
2023	BOOOOOM (立刻要爆炸)	Artists: W0LF(S) 五堅情; Release Date: December 7, 2023; Label: Reason Brothers; Genre: Mandopop

== Awards and nominations ==
List of awards and nominations received by W0LF(S)
Award	Year	Category	Result
16th KKBOX Music Awards	2021	Artist of the Year	Won
