= Kong Hong =

Taiwanese film producer and writer

Kong Hong (Chinese: 龔弘; 1915–2004), also known as Gong Hong, Kung Hung or Henry Kung, was a Taiwanese film producer and writer.

== Early life ==
Kong was a native of Chongming, Jiangsu (now part of Shanghai). He entered Shanghai High School in 1931. He entered the journalism department of the Nanjing School of Politics (南京中央政治學校, the predecessor of National Chengchi University) in 1933. In August 1937, at the start of the Battle of Shanghai, the school evacuated to Lushan, Jiangxi, and eventually ended up in Changsha, where it was located when he graduated in 1938. Soon after his graduation he married Chou Chia-yen (周家熙). His first son was born in 1939, and was followed by four more sons from 1942 to 1956 and a daughter in 1963.

== Career ==
Kong's early career took him through various positions as a cartoonist, a reporter, and an executive in both print journalism and radio. He began his media career having manhua published in Lin Yutang's Analects magazine (論語雜誌) in 1932. After his graduation from the Nanjing School of Politics, he worked for the Kuomintang's newly-established China Cultural Service. In 1942, at the height of the Second Sino-Japanese War, he was promoted to manager of the Kuomintang's Cultural Construction Printing Company (文化建設印刷公司), in which capacity he was posted to Kolkata, India, in 1944 as a writer for the Chinese Journal of India (印度日報), and was promoted to editor-in-chief in 1945. After the war he was stationed in Hong Kong, where he set up the Kuomintang's Overseas Publishing Company (海外出版社), and then returned to Shanghai to take up the position of general manager of the China Cultural Service. After the retreat of the government of the Republic of China to Taiwan in 1949, he first went again to Hong Kong, where he worked for an American publishing company (思文出版社) producing anti-Communist pamphlets. He continued to work for them after moving to Taipei in 1951, and also had cartoons published in the Central Daily News beginning in 1952.

Kong made his debut as a film producer with the documentary City of Cathay (1960), under the auspices of Chinese Art Films. Initially screened at the 21st Venice International Film Festival in its English translation by Loh I-cheng of the Government Information Office, it introduced the Song dynasty handscroll painting Along the River During the Qingming Festival. In 1963, Central Motion Picture Corporation (CMPC) president James Shen appointed Kong as general manager of the CMPC. Kong brought the Asian Film Festival to Taiwan for the first time the following year. During his tenure at CMPC, Kong drew inspiration from the technical style of Italian neorealist films, but sought to avoid their pessimistic themes. He thus brought to CMPC a style he dubbed healthy realism in films such as Li Hsing's The Oyster Girl (1963) and Beautiful Duckling (1964). These were both major commercial successes that helped to break the domination of Taiwan's film market by Hong Kong-produced Mandarin films as well as open up new markets for the Taiwan film industry in Southeast Asia. Kong further supported Li Hsing in making film adaptations of the romance novels of Chiung Yao, namely Four Loves and The Silent Wife (1965). Pai Ching-jui, a graduate of Centro Sperimentale di Cinematografia, also started his filmmaking career at CMPC under Kong's tenure, first co-directing the historical drama Fire Bulls (1966) and then making his solo directorial debut with Lonely Seventeen (1967); Kong then supported Pai in bringing the commedia all'italiana style to CMPC films with the commercially and critically successful The Bride and I (1969) and Home Sweet Home (1970). Kong resigned from his position at CMPC in 1972 for health reasons and creative conflicts with Li and Pai.

After leaving CMPC, Kong became a professor at the Chinese Culture University in Taipei. In 1975, Loh I-cheng invited Kong to New York to become the editor-in-chief of a Chinese-language newspaper, the Americas Daily (華僑美洲日報). In the 1980s, Kong wrote a series of four books containing biographies of various Chinese historical figures.

== Later life ==
Kong served as eastern U.S. president of the National Chengchi University Alumni Association. He received the Lifetime Achievement Award at the 36th Golden Horse Awards in 1999. He died due to respiratory failure in 2004.

== Filmography ==
Year	Chinese title	English title	Notes
1964	《蚵女》	Oyster Girl	
1964	《養鴨人家》	Beautiful Duckling	Best Narrative Feature, 3rd Golden Horse Awards (1965)
1965	《婉君表妹》	Four Loves	
1965	《啞女情深》	The Silent Wife	Nominated for Best Narrative Feature, 4th Golden Horse Awards (1966)
1965	《雷堡風雲》	An Unseen Trigger-Man	
1966	《還我河山》	Fire Bulls	
1966	《我女若蘭》	Orchids and My Love	Best Narrative Feature, 5th Golden Horse Awards (1967)
1967	《寂寞的十七歲》	Lonely Seventeen	
1967	《貂蟬與呂布》	Tiao Chan	
1967	《悲歡歲月》		
1967	《雙歸燕》		
1967	《路》	The Road	Best Narrative Feature, 6th Golden Horse Awards (1968)
1968	《情關》	Temptation	
1968	《生命之歌》		
1968	《珊瑚》		
1969	《八仙渡海掃妖魔》	Eight Immortals	
1969	《乾坤三決鬥》	The Valiant Villain	
1969	《新娘與我》	The Bride and I	
1969	《玉觀音》	Jade Goddess	
1969	《小翠》	The Petite Wife	
1970	《三朵花》	A Test of Love	
1970	《春梅》	The Unknown Man	
1970	《家在臺北》	Home Sweet Home	Best Narrative Feature, 8th Golden Horse Awards (1970)
1970	《萬博追蹤》		
1970	《群星會》	Stardust	
1970	《葡萄成熟時》	The Ripening Grape	
1971	《青衫客》	He Heals and Kills	
1971	《真假千金》	Love Can Forgive and Forget	
1971	《李娃》	Dolly Lee	
1971	《大地春雷》		
1971	《還君明珠雙淚垂》	Indebted for Life and Love	
1971	《事事如意》		
1971	《落鷹峽》	The Ammunition Hunter	Nominated for Best Narrative Feature, 9th Golden Horse Awards (1971)
1972	《無價之寶》	Judy’s Lucky Jacket	
1972	《白屋之戀》	Love in A Cabin	

== Works by Kong ==
- 《兩漢人物》 [Personages of Han]. 古人今談 [Modern View of the Ancients]. Vol. 1. 九歌出版社 [Chiu Ko Publishing]. 1983 [民國72年]. OCLC 10162961.
- 《三國人物》 [Personages of the Three Kingdoms]. 古人今談 [Modern View of the Ancients]. Vol. 2. 九歌出版社 [Chiu Ko Publishing]. 1983 [民國72年]. OCLC 658055570.
- 《隋唐人物》 [Personages of Sui and Tang]. 古人今談 [Modern View of the Ancients]. Vol. 3. 九歌出版社 [Chiu Ko Publishing]. 1984 [民國73年]. OCLC 818731240.
- 《兩宋人物》 [Personages of the Northern and Southern Song]. 古人今談 [Modern View of the Ancients]. Vol. 4. 九歌出版社 [Chiu Ko Publishing]. 1990 [民國79年]. OCLC 823001952.
