= Four Loves =

- DVD cover
- Chinese: 婉君表妹
- Literal meaning: Cousin Wan-chun
- Hanyu Pinyin: Wǎnjūn Biǎomèi
- Directed by: Li Hsing
- Screenplay by: Chou Hsu-chiang
- Based on: Wan-chun's Three Loves by Chiung Yao
- Produced by: Hu Chien-chung
- Starring: Tang Pao-yun; Chiang Ming; Wong Yung; Feng Hai; Tse Ling-ling
- Cinematography: Lai Cheng-ying
- Edited by: Shen Yeh-kang
- Music by: Tso Hung-Yuan
- Production company: Central Motion Picture Corporation
- Release date: August 24, 1965 (Taiwan)
- Running time: 102 minutes
- Country: Taiwan
- Language: Mandarin

Four Loves is a 1965 Taiwanese film directed by Li Hsing, based on Chiung Yao's 1964 novelette Wan-chun's Three Loves. This was the first ever film based on Chiung Yao's fiction.

== Plot ==
Wan-chun, a nine-year-old orphan, is taken in by the rich landlord Chou family, with the parents intending that Wan-chun marry their eldest son Po-chien when she turns 18. In their youth, the three boys and Wan-chun all refer to each other as "cousins". However, after they have grown up, and before Wan-chun marries, the younger brothers begin to court her as well. Wan-chun is unable to choose from among the brothers, leading to conflict as they all criticise her for her indecision. In the end, they all leave home and pursue careers in Shanghai.

Four Loves and The Silent Wife made alterations to Chiung's original stories, in particular with the addition of political elements such as emphasizing education for the disabled and military service, and in changing the character of Wan-chun from a tongyangxi (child bride) into a cousin.

== Cast ==
- Tang Pao-yun as Hsia Wan-chun
  - Tse Ling-ling as Hsia Wan-chun (child)
- Chiang Ming as Chou Po-chien
  - Yan Li (嚴禮) as Chou Po-chien (child)
- Wong Yung as Chou Chung-kang
  - Yu Chi-kung as Chou Chung-kang (child)
- Feng Hai (馮海) as Chou Shu-hao
  - Ba Ge as Chou Shu-hao (child)
- Wei Su as Father Chou
- Fuh Bih-huei as Mother Chou
- Betty Ting Pei as Wan-chun's classmate
- Ting Chiang as Teacher Huang
- Pan Chieh-yi (潘潔漪) as She Ma

== Production ==
In 1963, the Kuomintang government in Taipei greatly increased its investment in the state-owned Central Motion Picture Corporation (CMPC), seeking to use the medium of film as a propaganda vehicle for showing their progress in developing Taiwan's society. Newly-appointed CMPC general manager Kong Hong was an admirer of Italian neorealism, but in his position had to avoid the dark themes of poverty and corruption that often featured in Italian neorealist films, and so sought to adapt the technical style of Italian neorealism while "show[ing] in realism humanity that warmed the human heart". Kong had been impressed by director Li Hsing's realist film Our Neighbors that year, and so hired Li into CMPC to create films in a style that Kong dubbed healthy realism; after the commercial success of Lee's first two films, The Oyster Girl and Beautiful Duckling, Kong accepted Li's proposal to create film adaptations of the romance novels of popular local writer Chiung Yao.

== Themes ==
Four Loves takes place mostly in the Chou family's affluent residence, with a few exterior shots, mainly at a school on a mountainside which the middle brother attends. Though no scene directly depicts Shanghai, the city plays a large role in the plot, with all three brothers eventually leaving their hometown to work there. James Hicks analysed these three locations as dovetailing with the political themes of the film: the home and the school evoke nostalgia for old Confucian China, while Shanghai (in the time period in which the film was set, still under Kuomintang rule) is portrayed as a site where the followers of Sun Yat-sen's revolutionary ideals could develop China's future.

== Reception ==
Four Loves firmed up CMPC's leading position in Taiwan's film industry, and helped to cement Tang Pao-yun's reputation after her rise to fame in Li's previous film Beautiful Duckling. It was first screened in Singapore in September 1965, and continued to be shown in cinemas as late as the following February. A review by Xiang Xin in the Nanyang Siang Pau praised the childhood scenes in the first half of the film, but criticised it as having far less of a "human touch" than Beautiful Duckling and not featuring the same "outstanding" acting that Tang had previously demonstrated. Another review by Jiang Cun in the same paper praised the visuals, particular the house and the garden scenes, while noting that the tragedy that unfolded in the second half of the film, after the happy childhood scenes, weighed on the audience's emotions in every scene and "didn't even give an opportunity to catch one's breath".

The success of Four Loves and The Silent Wife (Li's next film) set off a "Chiung Yao wave" in the Chinese-language film world. Li Han-hsiang's Grand Motion Picture Corporation made eight films based on Chiung's novels in the following three years, while Shaw Brothers made four, and Chiung herself partnered with Ping Hsin-tao to set up her own film production company. However, during this "first wave" Li himself did not adapt any more of Chiung's stories to film, and the wave died down by 1970 with the increasing interest in wuxia films. During the "second Chiung Yao wave" beginning in 1973, Li directed several more adaptations, including The Young Ones and The Heart With a Million Knots. Li's break from making adaptations of Chiung's stories led to persistent rumours in the industry that there had been a falling-out between the two over the changes made to Wan-chun's character for Four Loves. In an interview after Li's death, Chiung stated that this was untrue: although she had initially opposed making Wan-chun into a cousin of the Chou brothers, in the end she felt that Li's changes had been done very well. She attributed the lack of cooperation between the two during that period to the fact that she had set up her own competing production company, and emphasised that she continued to meet with Li socially.

== Awards ==
1966 Golden Horse Awards

- Won—Best Child Star (Tse Ling-ling)
