= Golden Horse Award for Best Leading Actor =

Film awards for lead actor

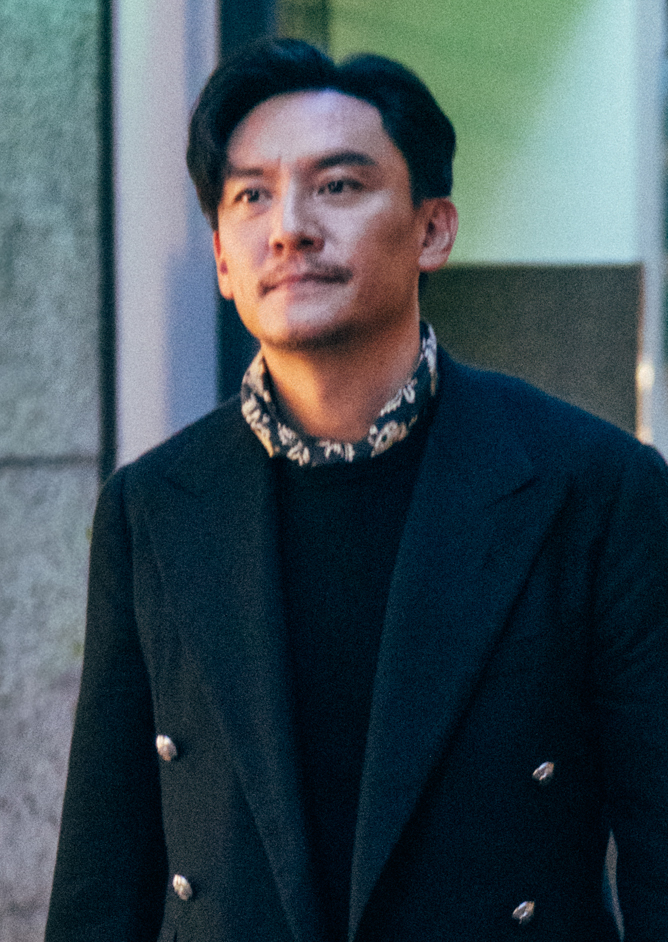
- The 2025 recipient: Chang Chen
- Awarded for: Best Performance by an Actor in a Leading Role
- Country: Taiwan
- Presented by: Taipei Golden Horse Film Festival Executive Committee
- First award: 1962
- Currently held by: Chang Chen for Lucky Lu (2025)
- Website: goldenhorse.org.tw

The Golden Horse Award for Best Leading Actor (Chinese: 金馬獎最佳男主角) is presented annually at Taiwan's Golden Horse Film Awards.

Hong Kong actor Tony Leung Chiu-wai holds the record for the most wins in this category, with three, for his performances in Chungking Express (1994), Infernal Affairs (2003), and Lust, Caution (2007). He also holds the record for the most nominations, with seven.

== Winners and nominees ==
indicates the winner

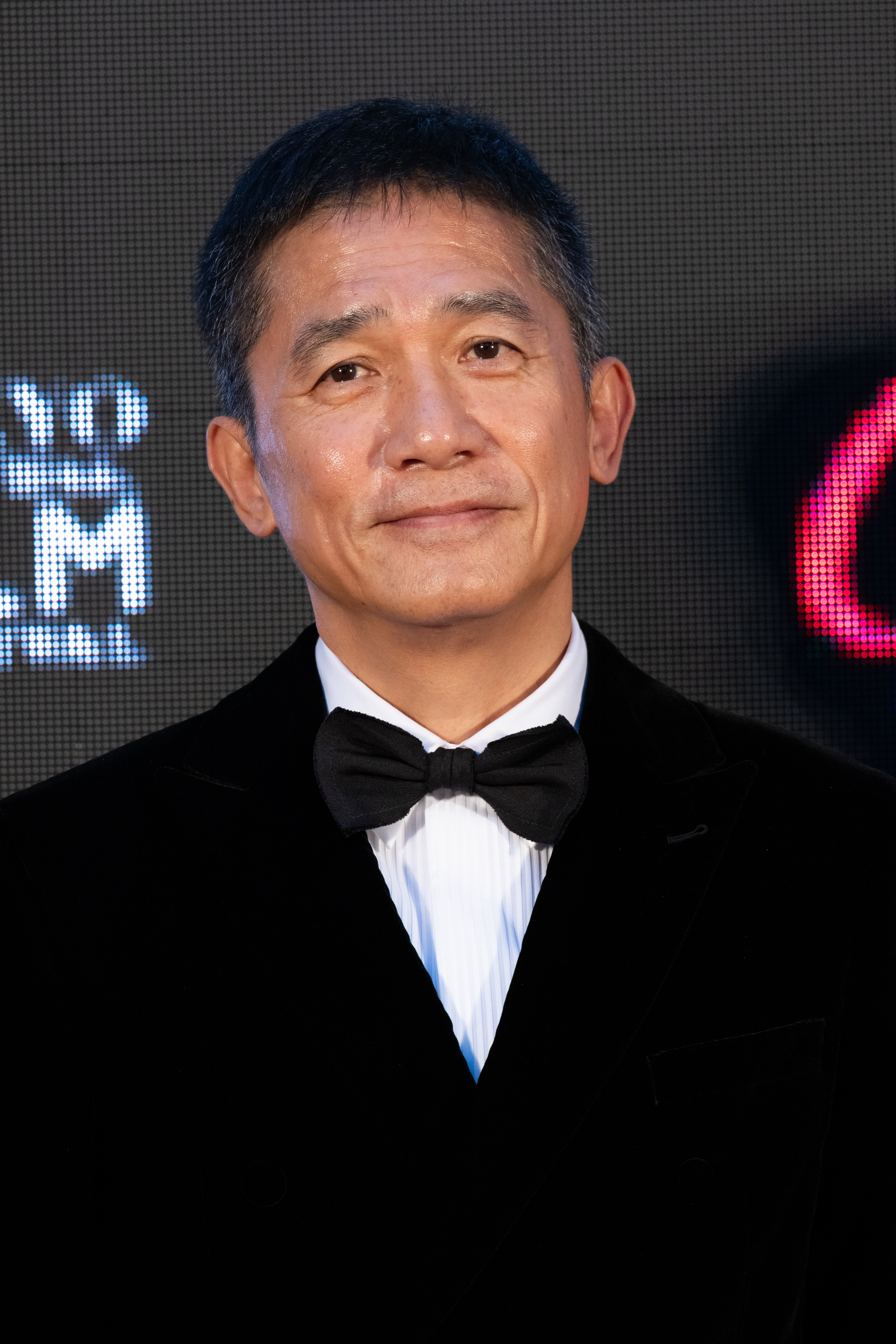
Tony Leung Chiu-wai won thrice for Chungking Express (1994), Infernal Affairs (2003), and Lust, Caution (2007)

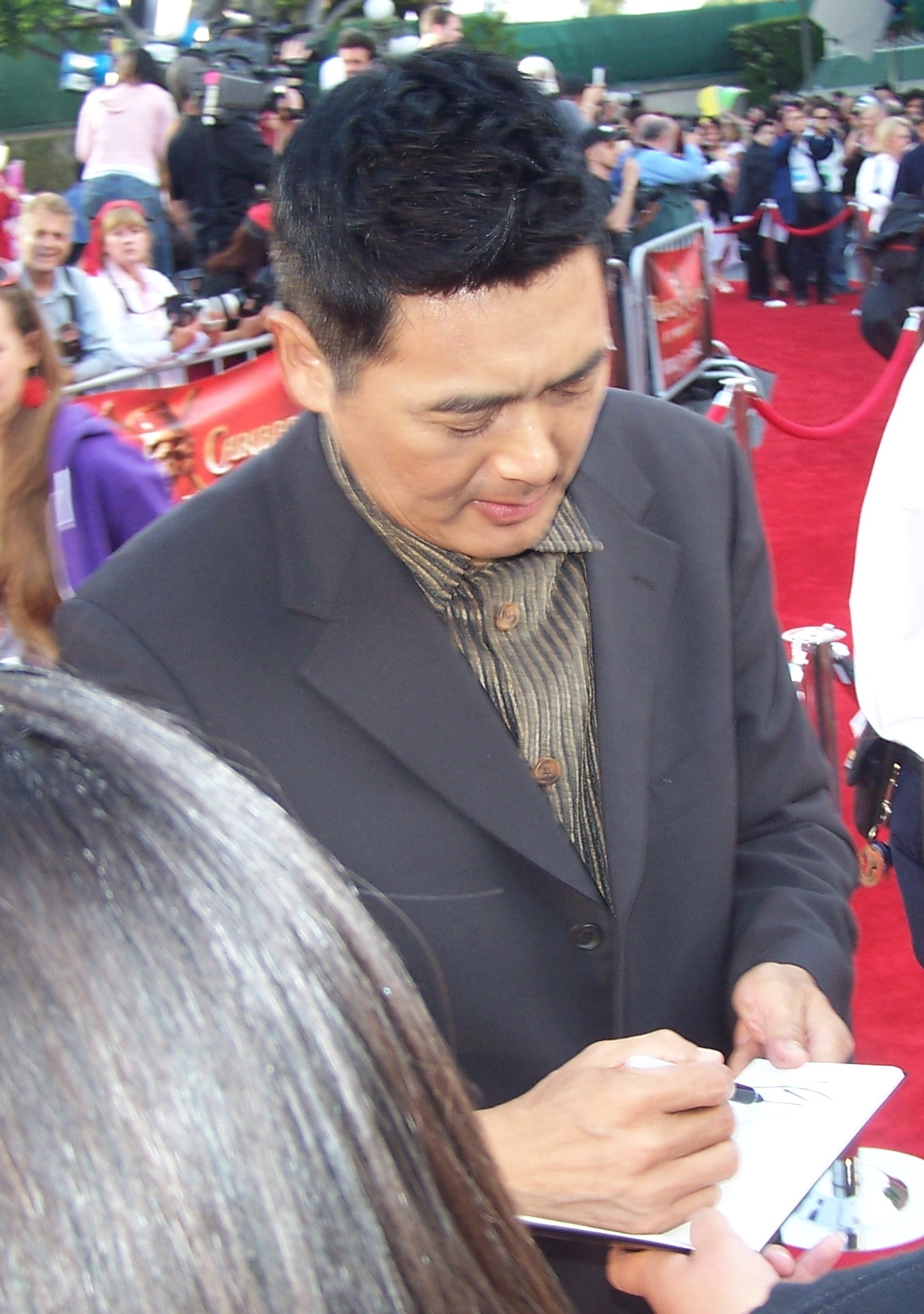
Chow Yun-fat won twice for Hong Kong 1941 (1985) and An Autumn's Tale (1987)

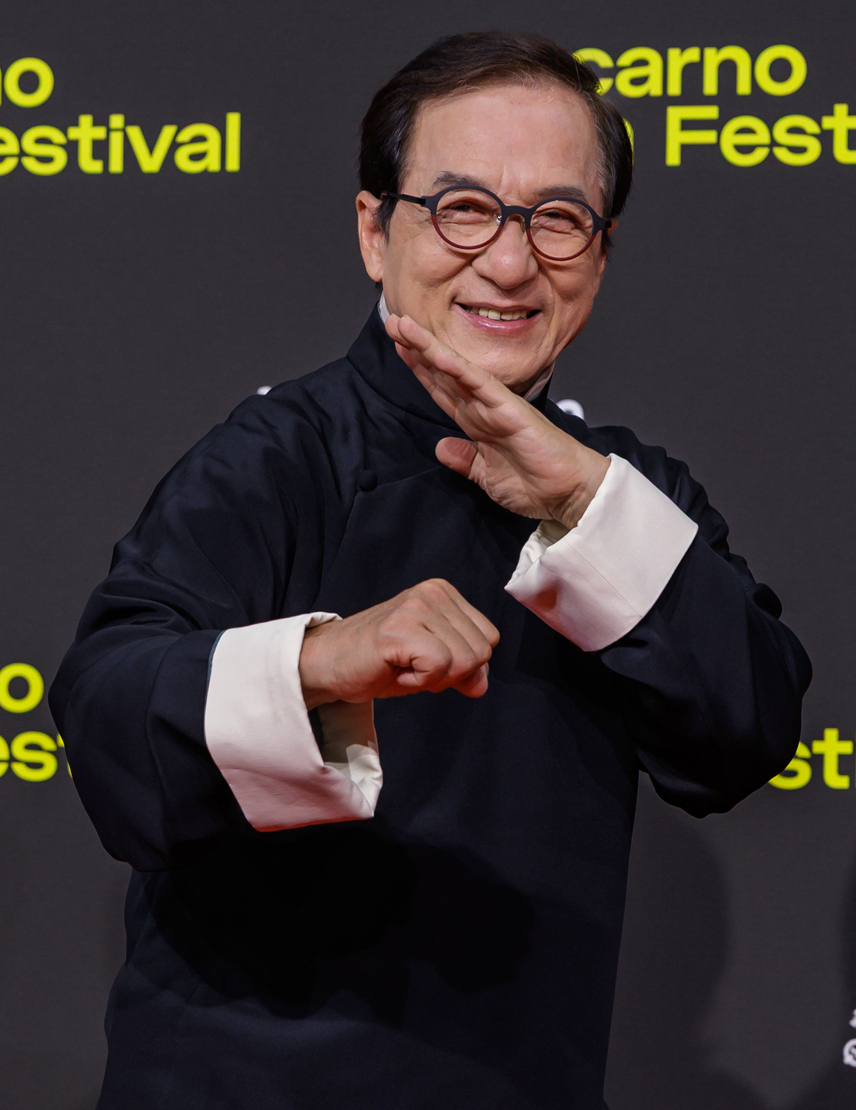
Jackie Chan won twice for Supercop (1992) and Crime Story (1993)

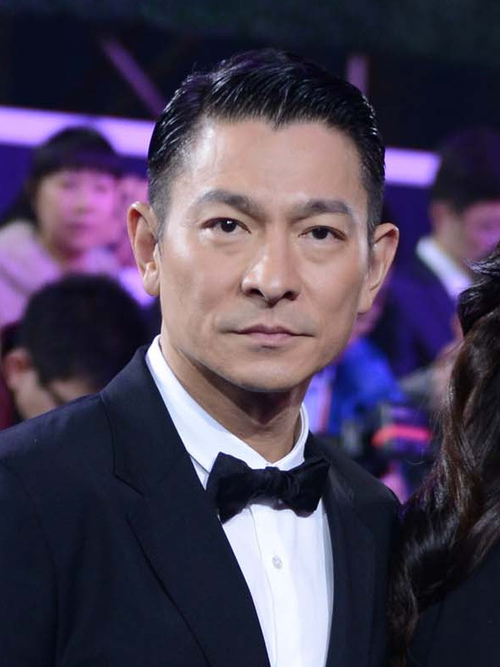
Andy Lau won twice for Infernal Affairs III (2004) and A Simple Life (2011)

Aaron Kwok won twice for Divergence (2005) and After This Our Exile (2006)

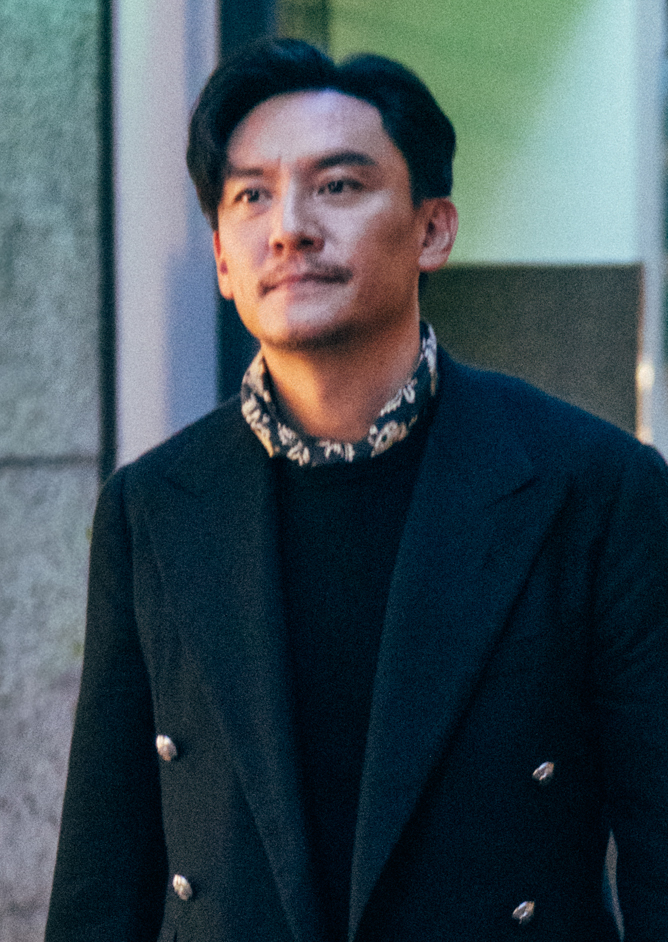
Chang Chen won twice for The Soul (2021) and Lucky Lu (2025)

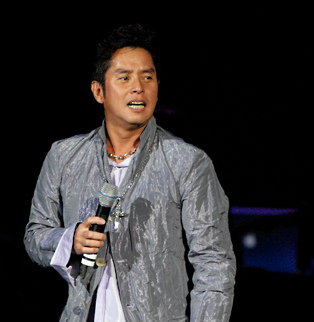
Alan Tam won for If I Were for Real (1981)

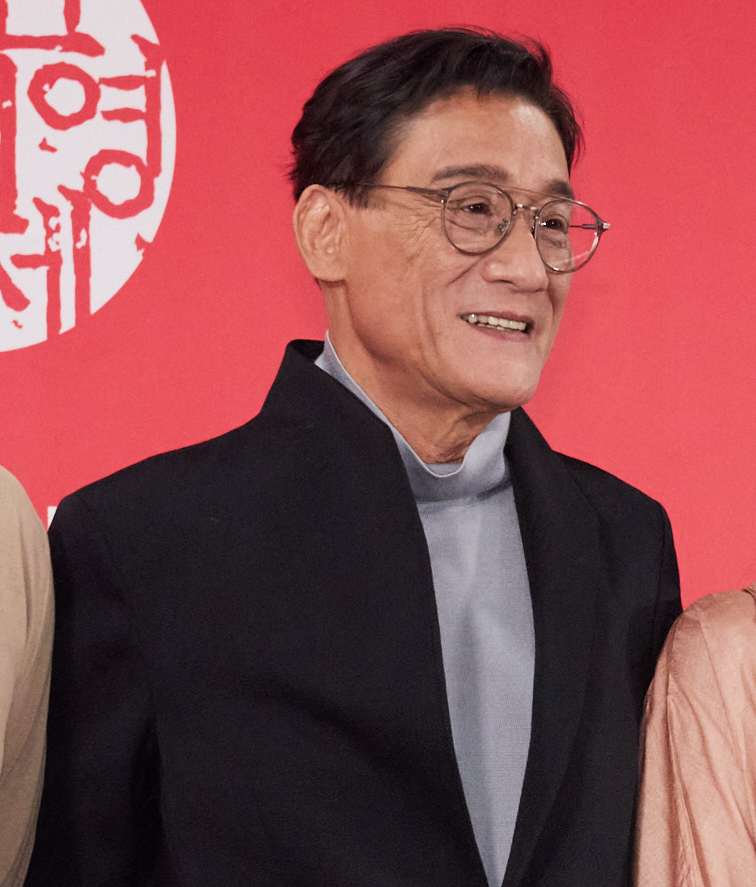
Tony Leung Ka-fai won for Farewell China (1990)

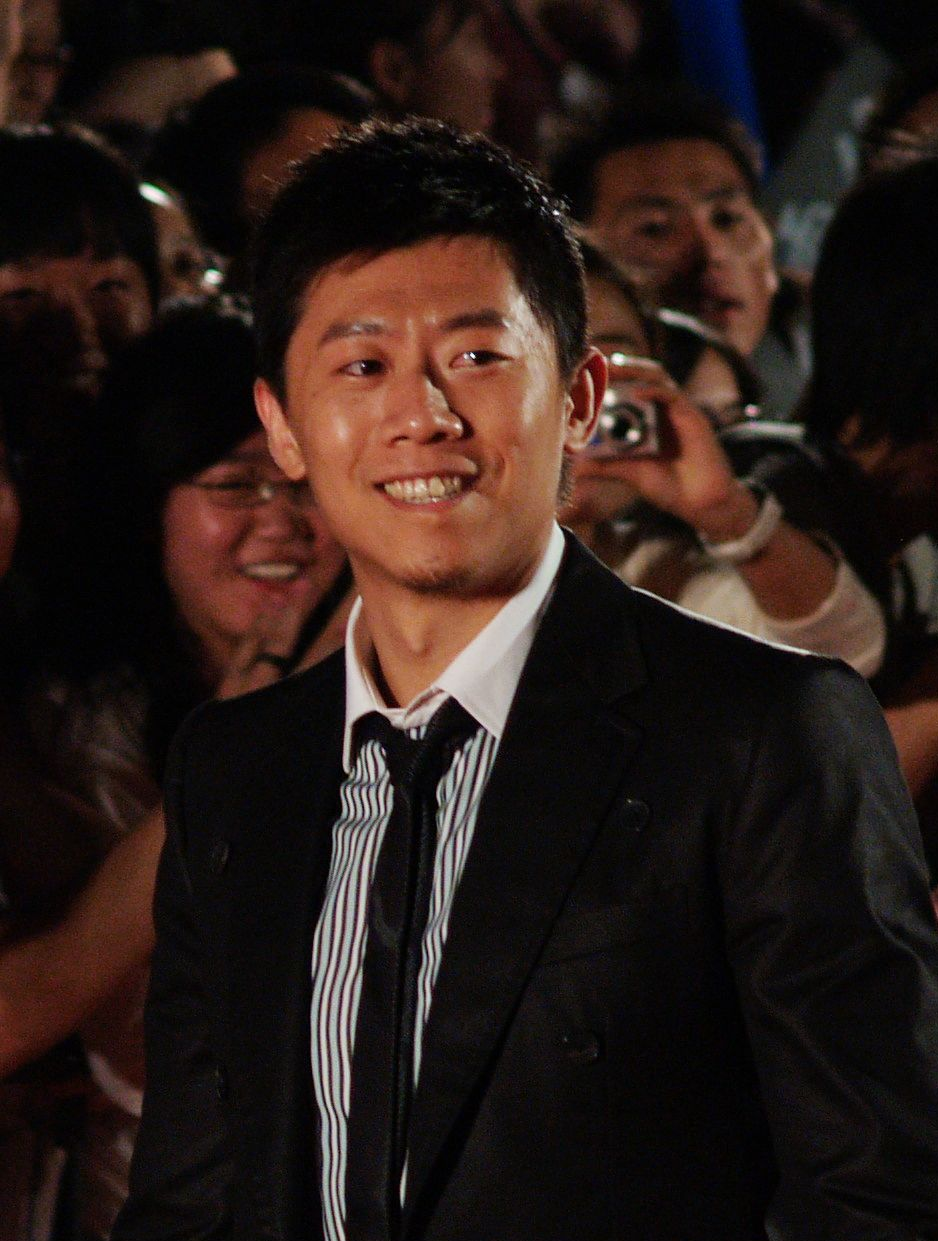
Xia Yu won for In the Heat of the Sun (1996)

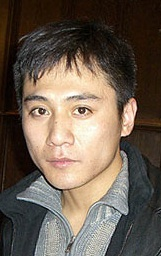
Liu Ye won for Lan Yu (2001)

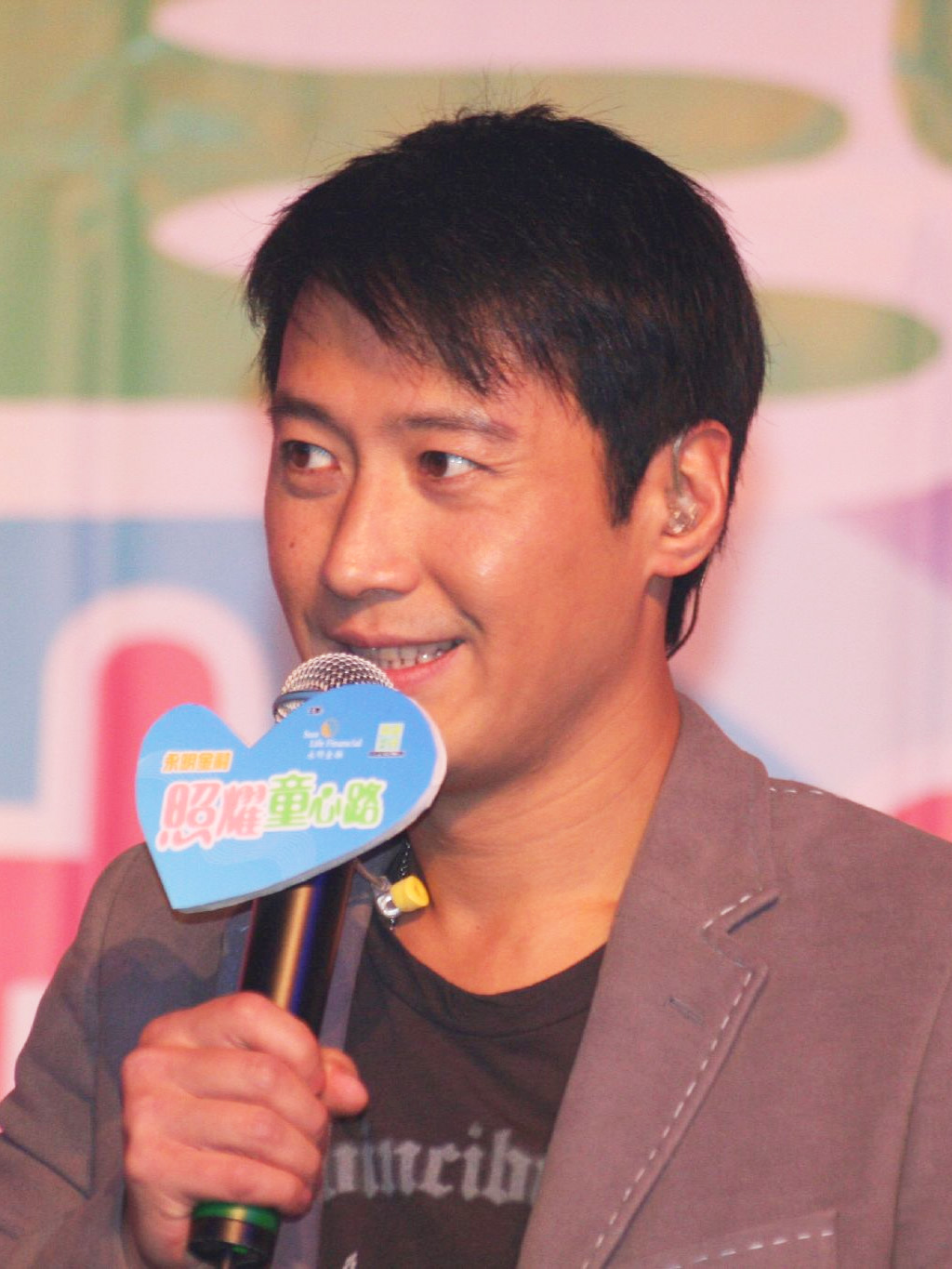
Leon Lai won for Three: Going Home (2002)

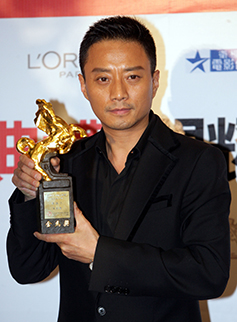
Zhang Hanyu won for Assembly (2008)

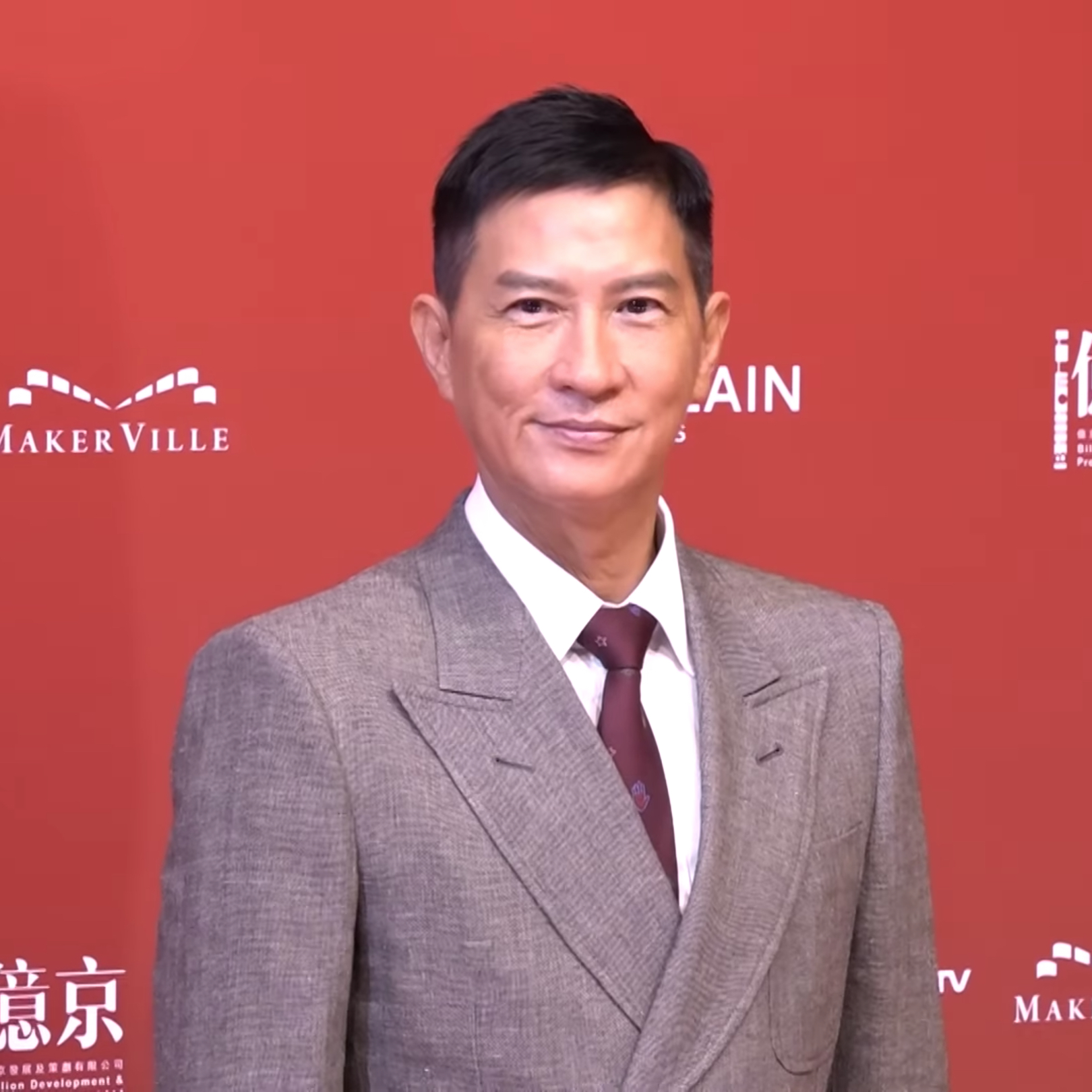
Nick Cheung won ex-æquo for Beast Stalker (2009)

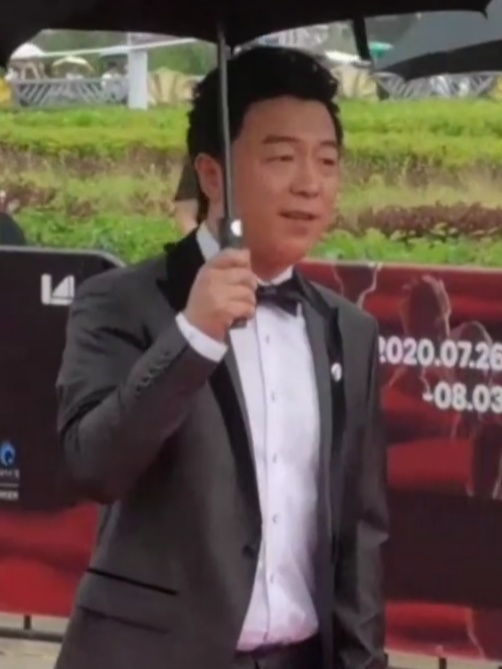
Huang Bo won ex-æquo for Cow (2009)

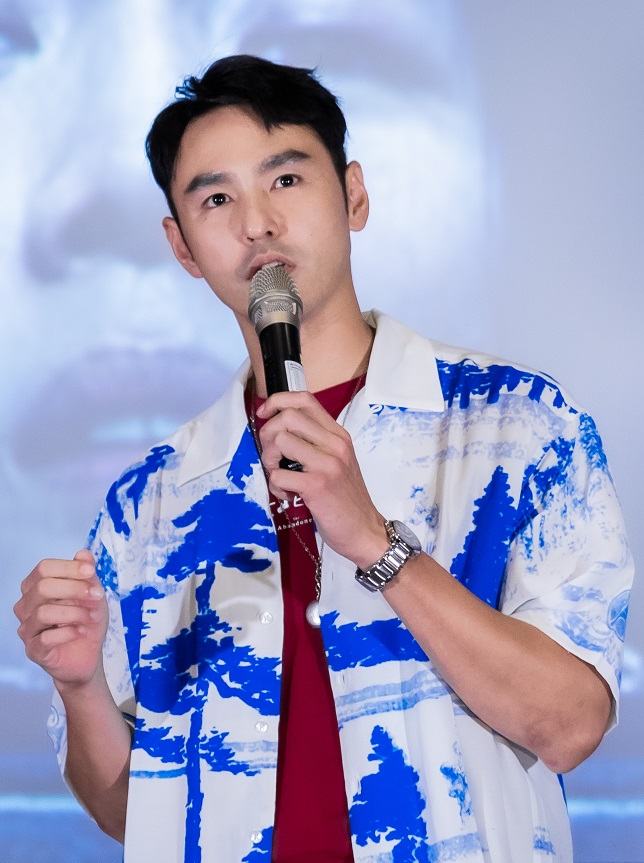
Ethan Juan won for Monga (2010)

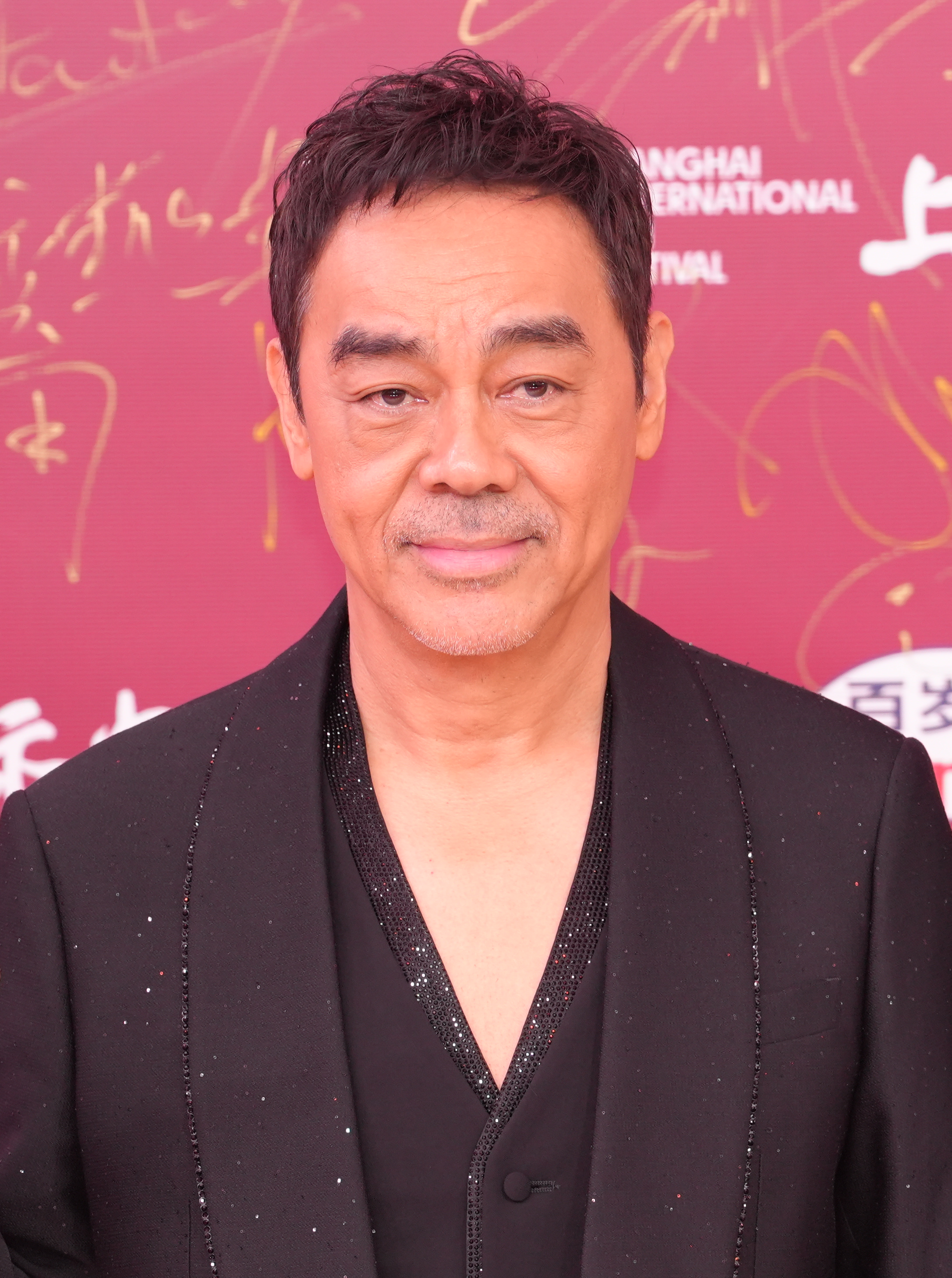
Sean Lau won for Life Without Principle (2012)

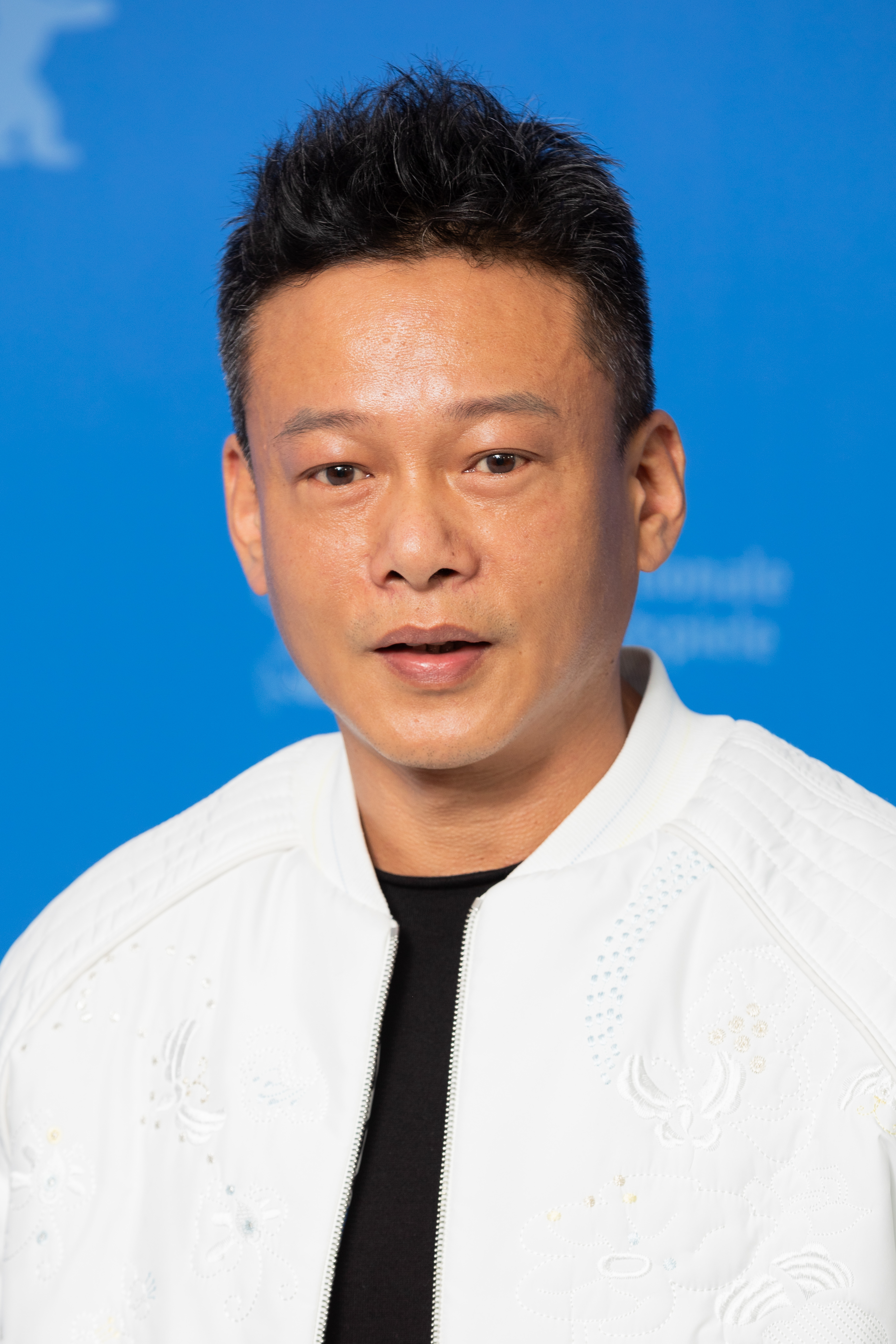
Lee Kang-sheng won for Stray Dogs (2013)

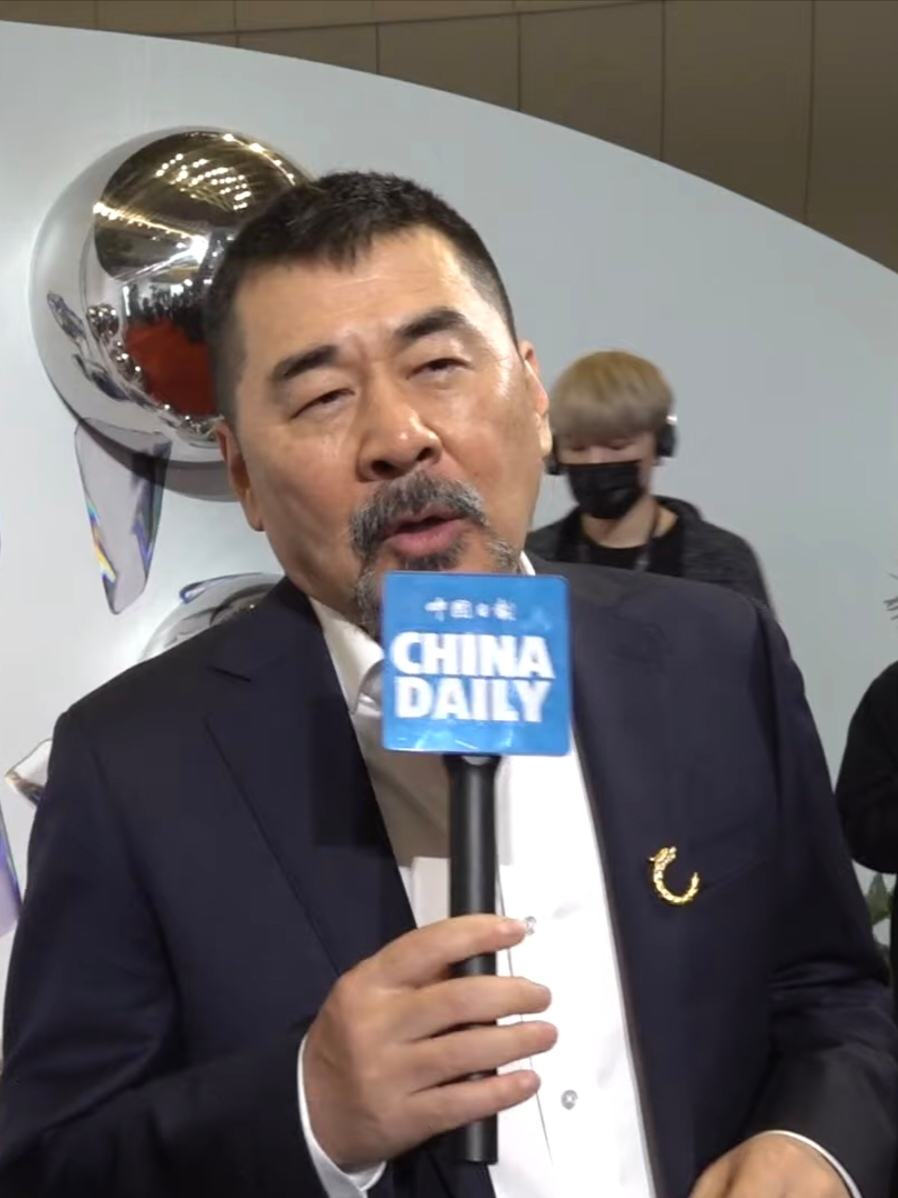
Chen Jianbin won for A Fool (2014)

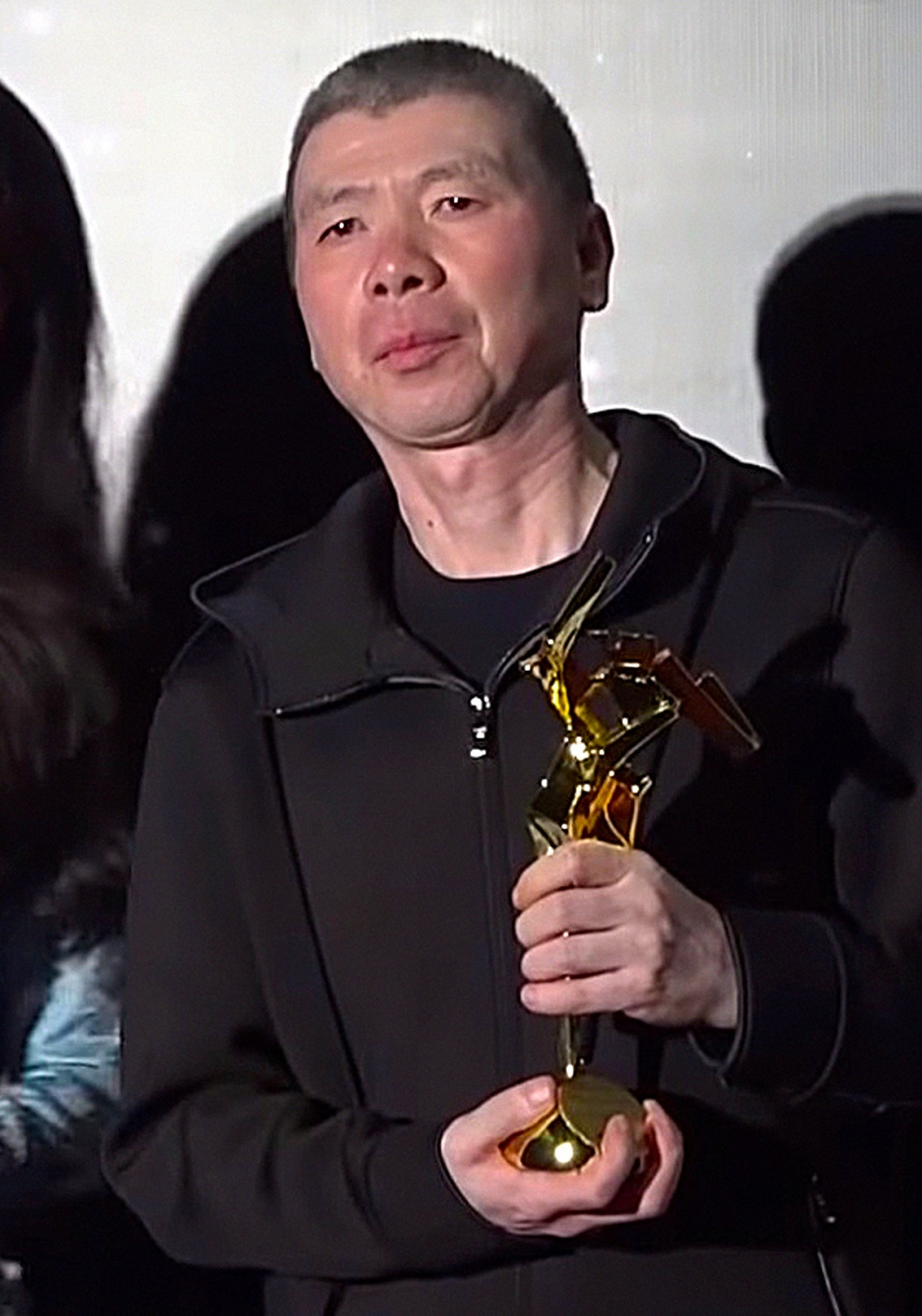
Feng Xiaogang won for Mr. Six (2015)

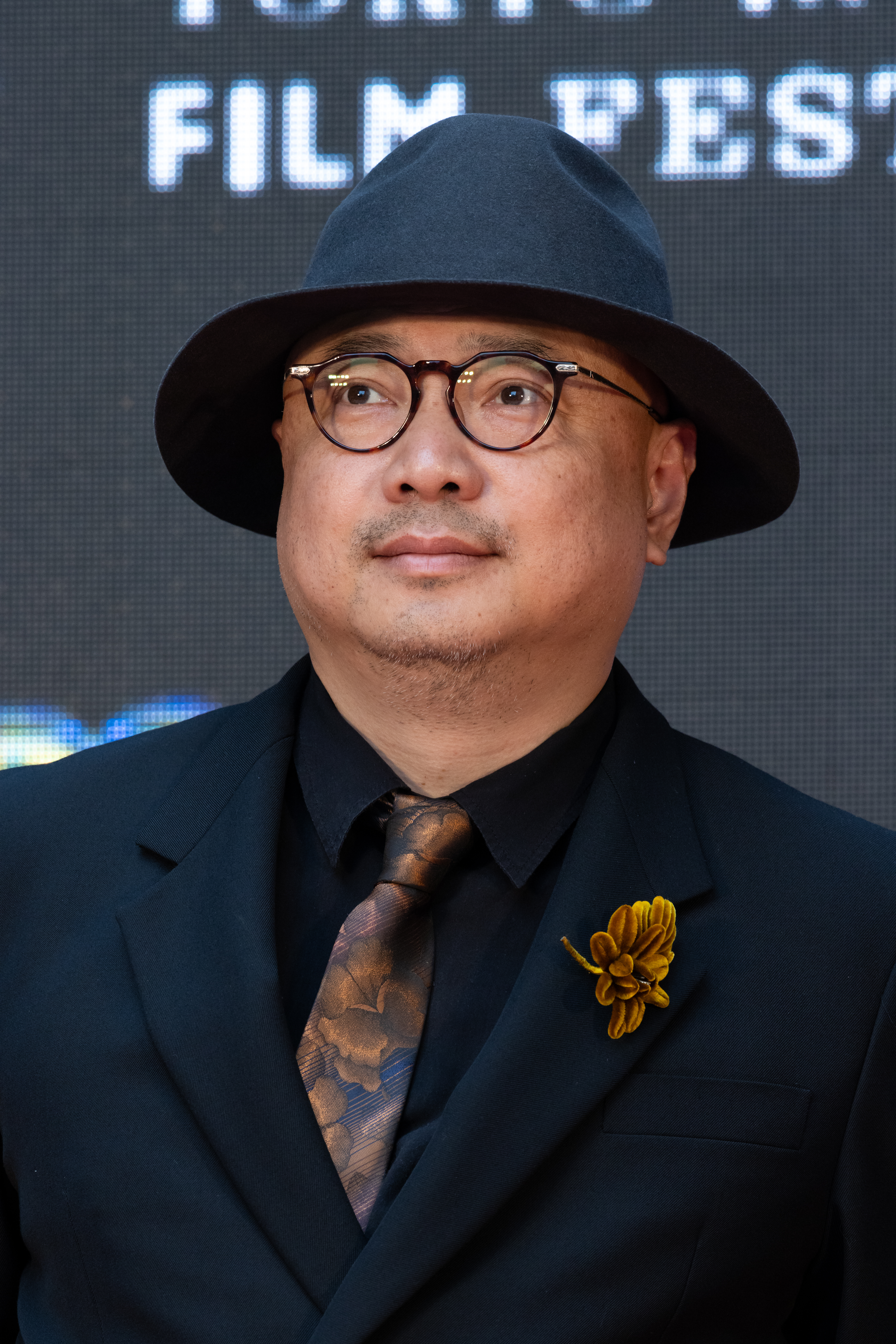
Xu Zheng won for Dying to Survive (2018)

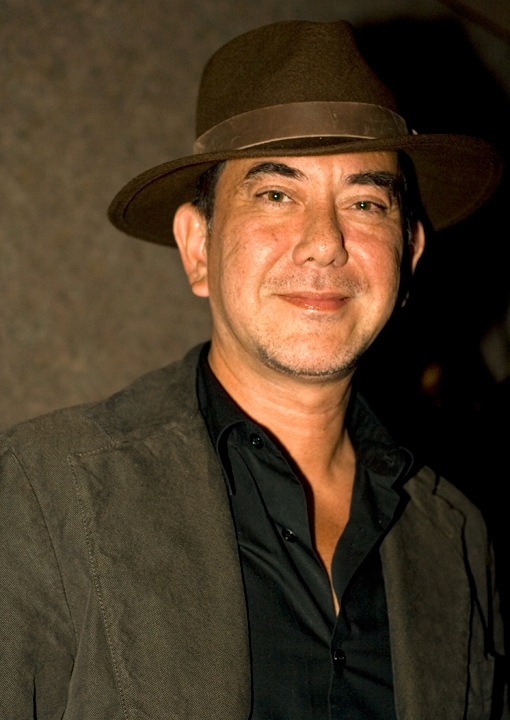
Anthony Wong won for The Sunny Side of the Street (2022)

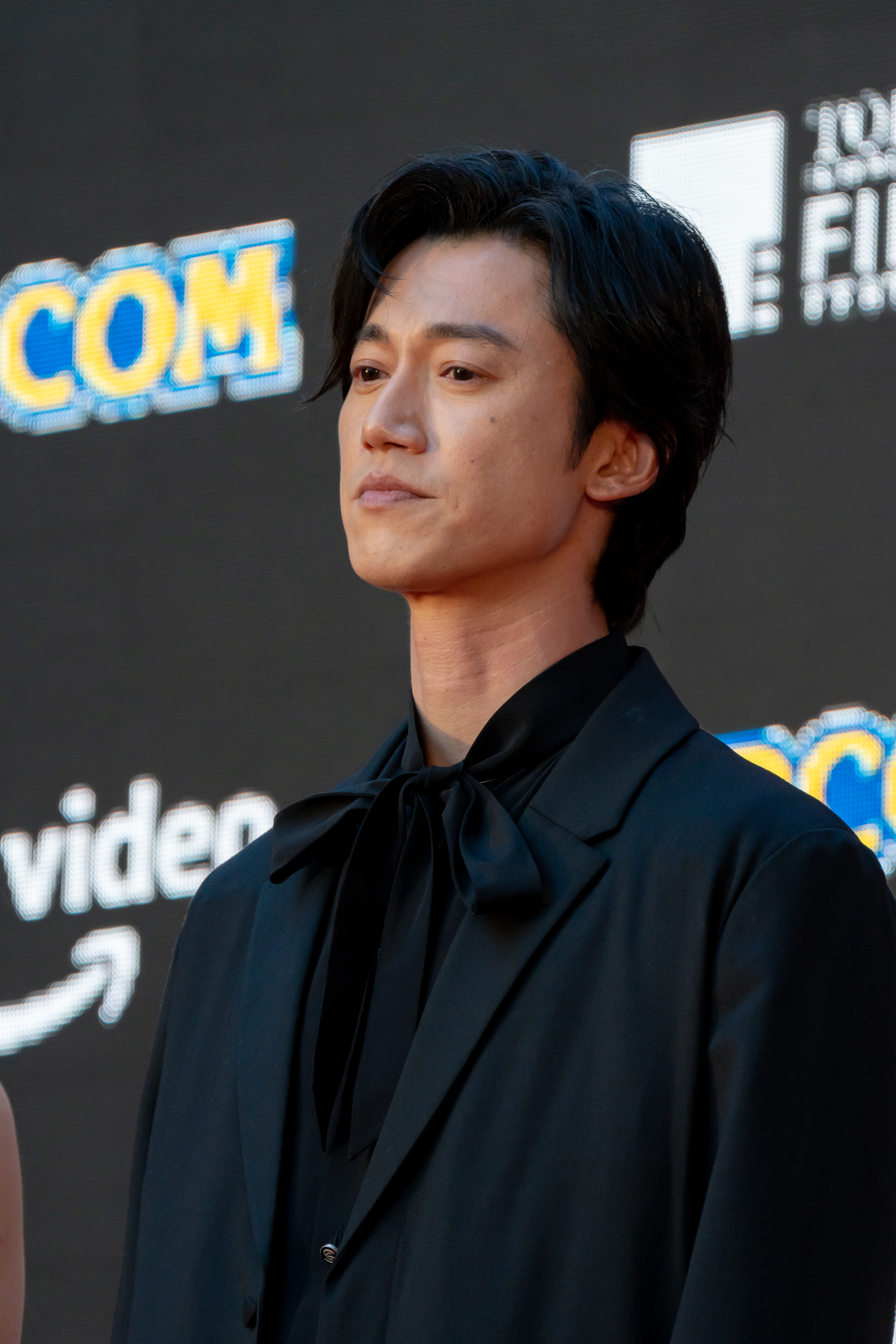
Wu Kang-ren won for Abang Adik (2023)

=== 1960s ===
Year	Recipient(s)	Film	Original title
1962 (1st)	Wang Yin	The Pistol	手槍
1963 (2nd)	Tang Ching	Dark night to dawn	黑夜到黎明
1965 (3rd)	Ko Hsiang-ting	Beautiful Duckling	養鴨人家
1966 (4th)	Zhao Lei	His-Shih, Beauty of Beauties	西施
1967 (5th)	Ou Wei	Hometown Robbery	故鄉劫
1968 (6th)	Tsui Fu-sheng	The Road	路
1969 (7th)	Peter Yang	Storm Over the Yangtse River	扬子江风云 揚子江風雲

=== 1970s ===
Year	Recipient(s)	Film	Original title
1970 (8th)	Ko Hsiang-ting	The Evergreen Mountains	高山青
1971 (9th)	Wang Yin	The Story of Tin-Ying	缇萦 緹縈
1972 (10th)	Ou Wei	Execution in Autumn	秋決
1973 (11th)	Peter Yang	The Escape	忍
1975 (12th)	Charlie Chin	Long Way From Home	长情万缕 長情萬縷
1976 (13th)	Chang Feng	Fragrant Flower Versus Noxious Grass	香花与毒草
1977 (14th)	Charlie Chin	Far Away From Home	人在天涯
1978 (15th)	Chin Han	He Never Gives Up	汪洋中的一條船
1978 (15th)	Bai Ying	The Operations of Spring Wind	望春風
1978 (15th)	Jimmy Wang Yu	Brothers	手足情深
1979 (16th)	Ko Chun-hsiung	A Teacher of Great Soldiers	黃埔軍魂
1979 (16th)	Shih Chun	Legend of the Mountain	山中傳奇
1979 (16th)	Liang Hsiu-shen	Love in Chilly Spring	春寒

=== 1980s ===
Year	Recipient(s)	Film	Original title
1980 (17th)	Wang Kuan-hsiung	White Jasmine	茉莉花
1980 (17th)	Wang Dao	The Pioneers	源
1980 (17th)	Ti Lung	The Heroes	俠骨英雄傳
1981 (18th)	Alan Tam	If I Were for Real	假如我是真的
1981 (18th)	Tony Liu	A Man of Immortality	大湖英烈
1981 (18th)	Heung Wan-pang	Fellow Students	同班同學
1982 (19th)	Eddie Chan	Man on the Brink	邊緣人
1982 (19th)	Wang Dao	The Battle for the Republic of China	辛亥雙十
1982 (19th)	Jeem Yim	Cream Soda and Milk	汽水加牛奶
1983 (20th)	Sun Yueh	Papa, Can You Hear Me Sing	搭错车
1983 (20th)	Chen Jen-lei	Traveler	失去監獄的囚犯
1983 (20th)	Alex Man	Hong Kong, Hong Kong	男與女
1984 (21st)	Danny Lee	Law with Two Phases	公僕
1984 (21st)	Jackie Chan	Project A	A計劃
1984 (21st)	Sun Yueh	Old Mao's Second Spring	老莫的第二個春天
1985 (22nd)	Chow Yun-fat	Hong Kong 1941	等待黎明
1985 (22nd)	Hou Hsiao-hsien	Taipei Story	青梅竹馬
1985 (22nd)	Alex Man	Hong Kong 1941	等待黎明
1986 (23rd)	Ti Lung	A Better Tomorrow	英雄本色
1986 (23rd)	Chow Yun-fat	A Better Tomorrow	英雄本色
1986 (23rd)	Kent Cheng	Why Me?	何必有我
1987 (24th)	Chow Yun-fat	An Autumn's Tale	秋天的童话
1987 (24th)	Max Mok	Lai Shi, China's Last Eunuch	中國最後一個太監
1987 (24th)	Alex Man	Brotherhood	兄弟
1988 (25th)	Alex Man	Gangland Odyssey	大頭仔
1988 (25th)	Sammo Hung	Painted Faces	七小福
1988 (25th)	Ti Lung	People's Hero	銀行風雲
1989 (26th)	Chen Sung-young	A City of Sadness	悲情城市
1989 (26th)	Doze Niu	Banana Paradise	香蕉天堂
1989 (26th)	Jackie Chan	Miracles	奇蹟

=== 1990s ===
Year	Recipient(s)	Film	Original title
1990 (27th)	Tony Leung Ka-fai	Farewell China	愛在他鄉的季節
1990 (27th)	Cho Sheng-li	The Story of a Gangster	刀瘟
1990 (27th)	Alex Man	Fraternity	兄弟珍重
1991 (28th)	Sihung Lung	Pushing Hands	推手
1991 (28th)	Leslie Cheung	Days of Being Wild	阿飛正傳
1991 (28th)	Chang Kuo-chu	A Brighter Summer Day	牯嶺街少年殺人事件
1991 (28th)	Chang Chen	A Brighter Summer Day	牯嶺街少年殺人事件
1992 (29th)	Jackie Chan	Supercop	警察故事III超級警察
1992 (29th)	Jet Li	Once Upon a Time in China II	黃飛鴻之II男兒當自強
1992 (29th)	Stephen Chow	Justice, My Foot!	威龍闖天關
1992 (29th)	Shao Xing	The Noblest Way to Die	黃金稻田
1993 (30th)	Jackie Chan	Crime Story	重案組
1993 (30th)	Wu Hsing-kuo	Temptation of a Monk	誘僧
1993 (30th)	Kent Cheng	Crime Story	重案組
1993 (30th)	Tony Leung Ka-fai	A Roof with a View	天台的月光
1994 (31st)	Tony Leung Chiu-wai	Chungking Express	重慶森林
1994 (31st)	Tsai Chen-nan	A Borrowed Life	多桑
1994 (31st)	Chang Shih	The Wooden Man's Bride	五魁
1994 (31st)	Lee Kang-sheng	Vive l'amour	愛情萬歲
1995 (32nd)	Lin Yang	Super Citizen Ko	超級大國民
1995 (32nd)	Roy Chiao	Summer Snow	女人四十
1995 (32nd)	Tony Leung Ka-fai	Evening Liaison	人約黃昏
1995 (32nd)	Lee Li-chun	The Daughter-in-Law	阿爸的情人
1996 (33rd)	Xia Yu	In the Heat of the Sun	陽光燦爛的日子
1996 (33rd)	Liu Linian	Foreign Moon	月滿英倫
1996 (33rd)	Leslie Cheung	Temptress Moon	風月
1996 (33rd)	Michael Wong	First Option	飛虎
1997 (34th)	Tse Kwan-ho	The Mad Phoenix	南海十三郎
1997 (34th)	Lee Chan-sam	Made in Hong Kong	香港製造
1997 (34th)	Leslie Cheung	Happy Together	春光乍洩
1997 (34th)	Miao Tien	The River	河流
1998 (35th)	Lobsang Chompel	Xiu Xiu: The Sent Down Girl	天浴
1998 (35th)	Anthony Wong	Beast Cops	野獸刑警
1998 (35th)	Tony Leung Chiu-wai	Your Place or Mine!	每天愛你8小時
1998 (35th)	Leon Lai	City of Glass	玻璃之城
1999 (36th)	Ko Chun-hsiung	Cao Cao	一代梟雄——曹操
1999 (36th)	Anthony Wong	Ordinary Heroes	千言萬語
1999 (36th)	Nicholas Tse	Metade Fumaca	半支煙
1999 (36th)	Sean Lau	Victim	目露凶光

=== 2000s ===
Year	Recipient(s)	Film	Original title
2000 (37th)	Francis Ng	The Mission	鎗火
2000 (37th)	Chu Chung-heng	Pure Accident	純屬意外
2000 (37th)	Tony Leung Chiu-wai	In the Mood for Love	花樣年華
2000 (37th)	Leslie Cheung	Double Tap	鎗王
2001 (38th)	Liu Ye	Lan Yu	藍宇
2001 (38th)	Andy Lau	Love on a Diet	瘦身男女
2001 (38th)	Ekin Cheng	Goodbye Mr. Cool	九龍冰室
2001 (38th)	Hu Jun	Lan Yu	藍宇
2002 (39th)	Leon Lai	Three: Going Home	三更之回家
2002 (39th)	Wing Fan	The Best of Times	美麗時光
2002 (39th)	Glen Chin	Hollywood Hong Kong	香港有個荷里活
2002 (39th)	Leslie Cheung	Inner Senses	異度空間
2003 (40th)	Tony Leung Chiu-wai	Infernal Affairs	無間道
2003 (40th)	Andy Lau	Infernal Affairs	無間道
2003 (40th)	Daniel Wu	Night Corridor	妖夜迴廊
2003 (40th)	Simon Yam	PTU	PTU
2004 (41st)	Andy Lau	Infernal Affairs III	無間道III: 終極無間
2004 (41st)	Jacky Cheung	Golden Chicken 2	金雞2
2004 (41st)	Tony Leung Chiu-wai	2046	2046
2004 (41st)	Tobgyal	Mountain Patrol: Kekexili	可可西里
2005 (42nd)	Aaron Kwok	Divergence	三岔口
2005 (42nd)	Tony Leung Ka-fai	Election	黑社會
2005 (42nd)	Chang Chen	Three Times	最好的時光
2005 (42nd)	Chen Kun	A West Lake Moment	鸳鸯蝴蝶
2006 (43rd)	Aaron Kwok	After This Our Exile	父子
2006 (43rd)	Sam Lee	Dog Bite Dog	狗咬狗
2006 (43rd)	Francis Ng	Wo Hu	臥虎
2007 (44th)	Tony Leung Chiu-wai	Lust, Caution	色，戒
2007 (44th)	Zhao Benshan	Getting Home	落葉歸根
2007 (44th)	Gurmit Singh	Just Follow Law	我在政府部门的日子
2007 (44th)	Aaron Kwok	The Detective	C+偵探
2008 (45th)	Zhang Hanyu	Assembly	集結號
2008 (45th)	Jet Li	The Warlords	投名狀
2008 (45th)	Liao Fan	Ocean Flame	一半海水 一半火焰
2008 (45th)	Louis Koo	Run Papa Run	一個好爸爸
2009 (46th)	Nick Cheung	Beast Stalker	證人
2009 (46th)	Huang Bo	Cow	斗牛
2009 (46th)	Akira Chen	Cannot Live Without You	不能沒有你
2009 (46th)	Daniel Wu	Like a Dream	如夢

=== 2010s ===
Year	Recipient(s)	Film	Original title
2010 (47th)	Ethan Juan	Monga	艋舺
2010 (47th)	Wang Xueqi	Bodyguards and Assassins	十月圍城
2010 (47th)	Ni Dahong	Judge	透析
2010 (47th)	Qin Hao	Spring Fever	春風沉醉的夜晚
2011 (48th)	Andy Lau	A Simple Life	桃姐
2011 (48th)	Eddie Peng	Jump Ashin!	翻滾吧！阿信
2011 (48th)	Ge You	Let the Bullets Fly	讓子彈飛
2011 (48th)	Wang Qianyuan	The Piano in a Factory	鋼的琴
2012 (49th)	Sean Lau	Life Without Principle	奪命金
2012 (49th)	Nick Cheung	Nightfall	大追捕
2012 (49th)	Joseph Chang	Girlfriend, Boyfriend	女朋友。男朋友
2012 (49th)	Chapman To	Vulgaria	低俗喜劇
2012 (49th)	Nicholas Tse	The Viral Factor	逆戰
2013 (50th)	Lee Kang-sheng	Stray Dogs	郊遊
2013 (50th)	Jimmy Wang Yu	Soul	失魂
2013 (50th)	Tony Leung Chiu-wai	The Grandmaster	一代宗師
2013 (50th)	Nick Cheung	Unbeatable	激戰
2013 (50th)	Tony Leung Ka-fai	Cold War	寒戰
2014 (51st)	Chen Jianbin	A Fool	一個勺子
2014 (51st)	Sean Lau	The White Storm	掃毒
2014 (51st)	Liao Fan	Black Coal, Thin Ice	白日焰火
2014 (51st)	Masatoshi Nagase	Kano	KANO
2014 (51st)	Chang Chen	Brotherhood of Blades	綉春刀
2015 (52nd)	Feng Xiaogang	Mr. Six	老炮兒
2015 (52nd)	Lee Hong-chi	Thanatos, Drunk	醉·生夢死
2015 (52nd)	Aaron Kwok	Port of Call	踏血尋梅
2015 (52nd)	Deng Chao	The Dead End	烈日灼心
2015 (52nd)	Dong Zijian	De Lan	德蘭
2016 (53rd)	Fan Wei	Mr. No Problem	不成問題的問題
2016 (53rd)	Tony Leung Ka-fai	Cold War 2	寒戰II
2016 (53rd)	Ko Chen-tung	The Road to Mandalay	再見瓦城
2016 (53rd)	Michael Hui	Godspeed	一路順風
2016 (53rd)	Jacky Cheung	Heaven in the Dark	暗色天堂
2017 (54th)	Tu Men	Old Beast	老獸
2017 (54th)	Kaiser Chuang	Who Killed Cock Robin	目擊者
2017 (54th)	Huang Bo	The Conformist	冰之下
2017 (54th)	Takeshi Kaneshiro	See You Tomorrow	擺渡人
2017 (54th)	Tian Zhuangzhuang	Love Education	相愛相親
2018 (55th)	Xu Zheng	Dying to Survive	我不是药神
2018 (55th)	Roy Chiu	Dear Ex	誰先愛上他的
2018 (55th)	Duan Yihong	The Looming Storm	暴雪將至
2018 (55th)	Deng Chao	Shadow	影
2018 (55th)	Peng Yuchang	An Elephant Sitting Still	大象席地而坐
2019 (56th)	Chen Yi-wen	A Sun	陽光普照
2019 (56th)	Wu Chien-ho	A Sun	陽光普照
2019 (56th)	Tai Bo	Suk Suk	叔．叔
2019 (56th)	Ben Yuen	Suk Suk	叔．叔
2019 (56th)	Chu Pak Hong	My Prince Edward	金都

=== 2020s ===
Year	Recipient(s)	Film	Original title	Ref.
2020 (57th)	Mo Tzu-yi	Dear Tenant	親愛的房客	
2020 (57th)	Austin Lin	I WeirDo	怪胎	
2020 (57th)	Mark Lee	Number 1	男兒王	
2020 (57th)	Gordon Lam	Hand Rolled Cigarette	手捲煙	
2020 (57th)	Liu Kuan-ting	My Missing Valentine	消失的情人節	
2021 (58th)	Chang Chen	The Soul	緝魂	
2021 (58th)	Kai Ko	Moneyboys	金錢男孩Moneyboys	
2021 (58th)	Roy Chiu	Man in Love	當男人戀愛時	
2021 (58th)	Francis Ng	Drifting	濁水漂流	
2021 (58th)	Cheng Jen-shuo	Gatao - The Last Stray	角头－浪流连	
2022 (59th)	Anthony Wong	The Sunny Side of the Street	白日青春	
2022 (59th)	Louis Cheung	The Narrow Road	窄路微塵	
2022 (59th)	Gordon Lam	Limbo	智齒	
2022 (59th)	Joseph Chang	The Post-Truth World	罪後真相	
2022 (59th)	Yu An-shun	Coo-Coo 043	一家子兒咕咕叫	
2023 (60th)	Wu Kang-ren	Abang Adik	富都青年	
2023 (60th)	Greg Hsu	Marry My Dead Body	關於我和鬼變成家人的那件事	
2023 (60th)	Austin Lin	Marry My Dead Body	關於我和鬼變成家人的那件事	
2023 (60th)	Wang Po-chieh	Eye of the Storm	疫起	
2023 (60th)	Ethan Juan	The Pig, The Snake and The Pigeon	周處除三害	
2024 (61st)	Zhang Zhiyong	Bel Ami	漂亮朋友	
2024 (61st)	Jason King	A Journey in Spring	春行	
2024 (61st)	Chang Chen	The Embers	餘燼	
2024 (61st)	Neo Yau	The Way We Talk	看我今天怎麼說	
2024 (61st)	Wanlop Rungkumjad	Mongrel	白衣蒼狗	
2025 (62nd)	Chang Chen	Lucky Lu		
2025 (62nd)	Richie Koh	A Good Child	好孩子	
2025 (62nd)	Will Or	A Foggy Tale	大濛	
2025 (62nd)	Joseph Chang	Deep Quiet Room	深度安靜	
2025 (62nd)	Lan Wei-hua	Family Matters	我家的事	

== Records ==
Superlative	Actor	Record set
Most awards	Tony Leung Chiu-wai	3
Most Nominations	Tony Leung Chiu-wai	7
Most nominations without winning	Leslie Cheung	5
Oldest winner	Lin Yang	63 years old (1995)
Youngest winner	Xia Yu	20 years old (1996)
Oldest nominee	Michael Hui	74 years old (2016)
Youngest nominee	Chang Chen	15 years old (1991)

The following individuals won two or more Golden Horse Awards for Best Leading Actor:

Wins	Actor
3	Tony Leung Chiu-wai
2	Jackie Chan
2	Andy Lau
2	Aaron Kwok
2	Chow Yun-fat
2	Charlie Chin
2	Ko Hsiang-ting
2	Peter Yang
2	Wang Yin
2	Ou Wei
2	Ko Chun-hsiung
2	Chang Chen

The following individuals received five or more Best Actor nominations:

Nominations	Actor
7	Tony Leung Chiu-wai
6	Tony Leung Ka-fai
6	Chang Chen
5	Alex Man
5	Leslie Cheung

== See also ==
- Academy Award for Best Actor
- Asian Film Award for Best Actor
- BAFTA Award for Best Actor in a Leading Role
- Blue Dragon Film Award for Best Actor
- Hong Kong Film Award for Best Actor
- Japan Academy Film Prize for Outstanding Performance by an Actor in a Leading Role
