= 5th Golden Horse Awards =

1967 Taiwan film awards ceremony

- Date: October 30, 1967
- Site: Zhongshan Hall, Taipei, Taiwan
- Hosted by: Wei Ching-meng
- Organized by: Taipei Golden Horse Film Festival Executive Committee

Highlights
- Best Feature Film: Orchids and My Love
- Best Director: Lee Chia; Orchids and My Love
- Best Actor: Ou Wei; Hometown Plunders
- Best Actress: Chiang Ching; Many Enchanting Nights
- Most awards: Orchids and My Love (6)

The 5th Golden Horse Awards (Chinese: 第5屆金馬獎) took place on October 30, 1967 at Zhongshan Hall in Taipei, Taiwan.

== Winners and nominees ==
Winners are listed first, highlighted in boldface.

**Best Feature Film**: **Orchids and My Love**; The Blue and the Black (runner-up); Till the End of Time (runner-up); Wife of a Romantic Scholar (runner-up)	**Best Documentary**: **Gao Shan Yang Zhi**; Guo Jun Yun Dong Hui (runner-up); New Face of Taiwan (runner-up)
**Best Director**: **Lee Chia — Orchids and My Love**	**Best Leading Actor**: **Ou Wei — Hometown Plunders**
**Best Leading Actress**: **Chiang Ching — Many Enchanting Nights**	**Best Supporting Actor**: **Tsui Fu-sheng — The Monument of Virtue**
**Best Supporting Actress**: **Angela Yu — The Blue and the Black**	**Best Child Star**: **Tse Ling-ling — Orchids and My Love**
**Best Screenplay**: **Chun Yik-foo — Wife of a Romantic Scholar**	**Best Cinematography - Color**: **Lin Wen-chin — Orchids and My Love**
**Best Film Editing**: **Wang Chin-chen — Orchids and My Love**	**Best Art Direction**: **Weng Wen-wei — Orchids and My Love**
**Best Music**: **Joseph Koo — Till the End of Time**	**Best Sound Recording**: **Yin Bian-ping — Wife of a Romantic Scholar**
**Best Cinematography for Documentary**: **Lee Hsin-yi — Gao Shan Yang Zhi**	**Best Planning for Documentary**: **Chao Chun — Gao Shan Yang Zhi**
**Special Award of National Spirit**: **Return My Homeland**	**Special Award**: **Hometown Plunders**
