= Orchids and My Love =

1966 Taiwanese film

- Film poster

Chinese name
- Traditional Chinese: 我女若蘭
Transcriptions
- Directed by: Li Chia
- Written by: Chang Yung-hsiang
- Produced by: Kong Hong
- Starring: Tang Pao-yun; Ko Hsiang-ting; Tse Ling-ling; Lin Yan; Feng Hai
- Cinematography: Hua Hui-Ying
- Edited by: Wang Chin-Chen
- Music by: Li Lin
- Production company: Central Motion Picture Corporation
- Release date: 26 March 1966 (Taiwan)
- Running time: 119 minutes
- Country: Taiwan
- Language: Chinese

Orchids and My Love (Chinese: 我女若蘭; pinyin: Wo nu ruo lan) is a 1966 Taiwanese drama film. It won six awards at the 5th Golden Horse Film Festival, including Best Feature Film and Best Director for Li Chia. The film drew attention for its embodiment of Confucian ethics, in comparison to Beautiful Duckling.

== Plot ==
Young Meng Rou-lan (Tse Ling-ling) loves ballet, but cannot perform as she has polio. She is raised by her father (Ko Hsiang-ting) on an orchid farm. His unconditional love sees Meng through her recovery. As she matures to adulthood (Tang Pao-yun), Meng learns to treasure her independence.

== Cast ==
- Tang Pao-yun as Ruo-Lan - The Daughter
- Ko Hsiang-ting as The Father
- Tse Ling-ling as Young Ruo-Lan
- Lin Yan
- Feng Hai
- Ko Pa
