= Tang Pao-yun =

Taiwanese actress

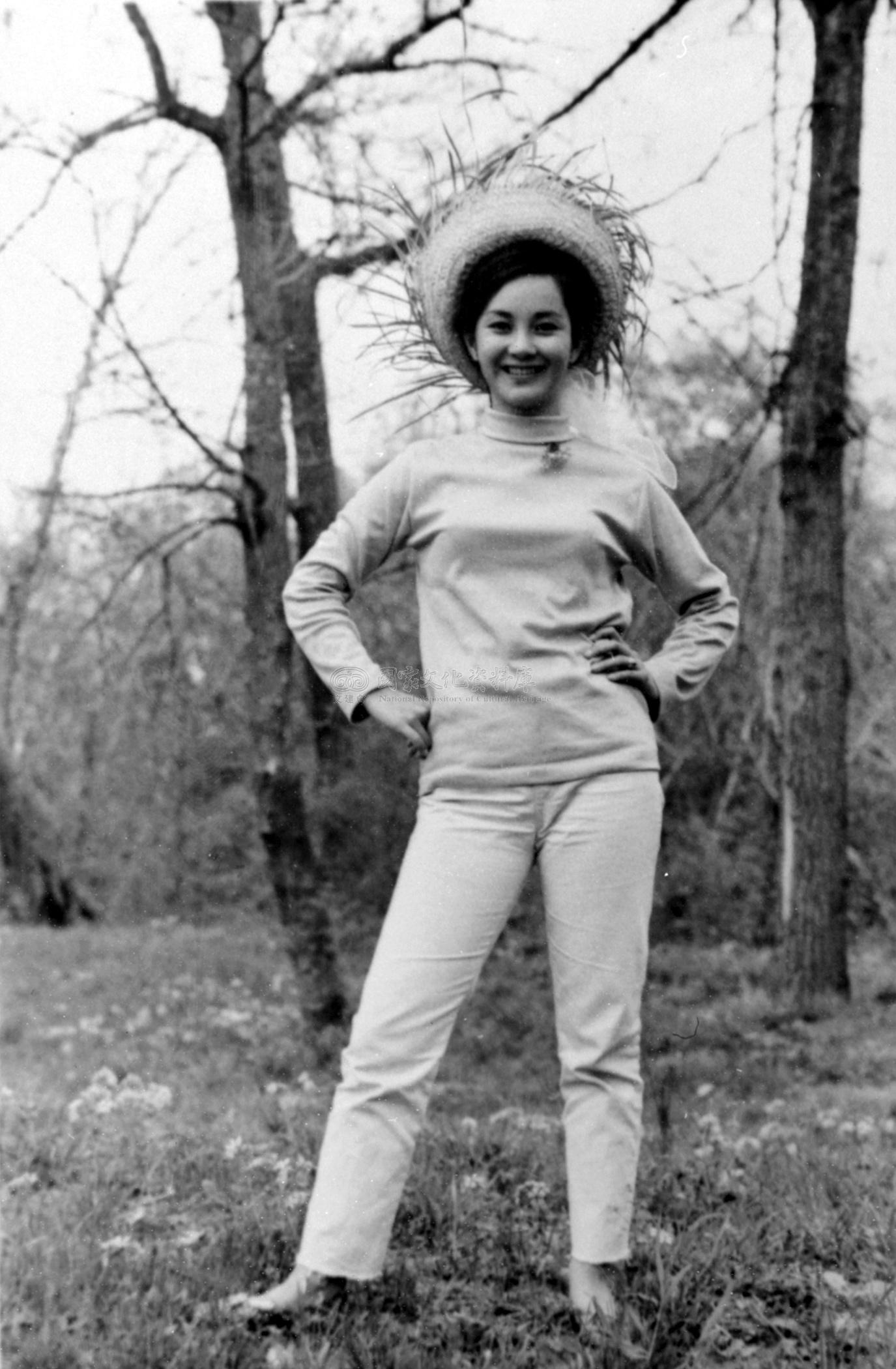
Tang in 1969

Tang Pao-yun (Chinese: 唐寶雲; 1944 – 14 May 1999) was a Taiwanese actress.

She was born in 1944, and attended an acting school run by the Central Motion Picture Corporation. After ending her studies in 1961, she appeared in her first films the next year. Tang was named best supporting actress at the 1962 Asian Film Festival, and won the same award at the first Golden Horse Film Festival. Tang's role in Beautiful Duckling (1965) was considered a breakout performance. She would later co-star in other films alongside Ou Wei, namely Love is an Elusive Wind (1972). Soon after Beautiful Duckling, another film directed by Li Hsing and starring Tang was released, Four Loves (1965). Other notable credits included Orchids and My Love (1966), Remember Chu (1966), and Lonely 17 (1967). Later in her career, Tang appeared in Execution in Autumn (1972), Fists for Revenge (1974), and All the King's Men (1983).
