= 3rd Golden Horse Awards =

1965 film awards ceremony in Taiwan

- Date: October 30, 1965
- Site: Zhongshan Hall, Taipei, Taiwan
- Hosted by: James Shen
- Organized by: Taipei Golden Horse Film Festival Executive Committee

Highlights
- Best Feature Film: Beautiful Duckling
- Best Director: Li Hsing; Beautiful Duckling
- Best Actor: Ko Hsiang-ting; Beautiful Duckling
- Best Actress: Li Li-hua; Between Tears and Smiles
- Most awards: Beautiful Duckling (4)

The 3rd Golden Horse Awards (Chinese: 第3屆金馬獎) took place on October 30, 1965 at Zhongshan Hall in Taipei, Taiwan.

== Winners and nominees ==
Winners are listed first, highlighted in boldface.

**Best Feature Film**: **Beautiful Duckling**; Romance of the Forbidden City (runner-up); Ren Zhi Chu (runner-up); The Warlord and the Actress (runner-up)	**Best Documentary**: **53rd National Day of the Republic of China**; Shihmen Dam (runner-up); Wu Chang Yan Xi (runner-up)
**Golden Horse Grant**: **Agent No. 88**; **Zui Hou De Cai Pan**	**Best Director**: **Li Hsing — Beautiful Duckling**
**Best Leading Actor**: **Ko Hsiang-ting — Beautiful Duckling**	**Best Leading Actress**: **Li Li-hua — Between Tears and Smiles**
**Best Supporting Actor**: **Ching Miao — Between Tears and Smiles**	**Best Supporting Actress**: **Wang Lai — Ren Zhi Chu**
**Best Child Star**: **Hsiao Lung — Zui Hou De Cai Pan**	**Best Screenplay**: **Wang Liuzhao — Four Brave Ones**
**Best Cinematography - Color**: **Lai Cheng-ying — Beautiful Duckling**	**Best Cinematography - Black-and-White**: **Wang Jianhan — The Coin**
**Best Film Editing**: **Wang Chao-hsi — Romance of the Forbidden City**	**Best Music**: **Lo Ming-tao — Lovers' Rock**; **Joseph Koo — The Dancing Millionairess**
**Best Sound Recording**: **Sun Ping-yun — Romance of the Forbidden City**	**Best Cinematography for Documentary**: **Li Hsing-shan et al. — 53rd National Day of the Republic of China**
**Best Planning for Documentary**: **Chi Ho-hsi and Tuan Mu-hsuan — Blossoms on a Moonlit River in Spring**	**Best Art Direction**: **Tsao Nien-lung — Trouble on the Wedding Night**
**Special Award - Art Direction**: **Blossoms on a Moonlit River in Spring**	**Special Award of National Spirit**: **Four Brave Ones**
