= 12th Golden Horse Awards =

1975 Taiwanese film awards ceremony

- Date: October 30, 1975
- Site: Zhongshan Hall, Taipei, Taiwan
- Organized by: Taipei Golden Horse Film Festival Executive Committee

Highlights
- Best Feature Film: Land of the Undaunted
- Best Director: Liu Yi; Long Way from Home
- Best Actor: Charlie Chin; Long Way from Home
- Best Actress: Lisa Lu; The Empress Dowager

The 12th Golden Horse Awards (Mandarin:第12屆金馬獎) took place on October 30, 1975, at Zhongshan Hall in Taipei, Taiwan.

== Winners and nominees ==
Winners are listed first, highlighted in boldface.

**Best Feature Film**: **Land of the Undaunted**; Long Way from Home (runner-up); Miss Staff Sergeant (runner-up); The Empress Dowager (runner-up); The Life God (runner-up); Girl Friend (runner-up)	**Best Documentary**: **Feng Huo Ci Hang**; Mu Qin Xin Sheng (runner-up); Zengwen Dam (runner-up); Greenland (runner-up); Coal Mining in Ruifang (runner-up)
**Best Director**: **Liu Yi — Long Way from Home**	**Best Leading Actor**: **Charlie Chin — Long Way from Home**
**Best Leading Actress**: **Lisa Lu — The Empress Dowager**	**Best Supporting Actor**: **Yi Ming — The Life God**
**Best Supporting Actress**: **Josephine Siao — Girl Friend**	**Best Screenplay**: **Chang Yung-hsiang — Land of the Undaunted**
**Best Cinematography - Color**: **Lin Tsan-ting — Girl Friend**	**Best Film Editing**: **Peter Cheung — The Man from Hong Kong**
**Best Art Direction - Color**: **Chen Ching-shen — The Empress Dowager**	**Best Music**: **Wen Lung-hsin — The Life God**
**Best Sound Recording**: **Wang Yong-hua — Five Shaolin Masters**	**Best Cinematography for Documentary**: **Yu Ju-chi — Mu Qin Xin Sheng**
**Best Planning for Documentary**: **Hua Kuang-tien — Feng Huo Ci Hang**	**National Spirit Award**: **The Everlasting Glory**
