= 8th Golden Horse Awards =

1970 Taiwan film awards ceremony

- Date: October 30, 1970
- Site: Zhongshan Hall, Taipei, Taiwan
- Organized by: Taipei Golden Horse Film Festival Executive Committee

Highlights
- Best Feature Film: Home, Sweet Home
- Best Director: Chang Tseng-chai; From the Highway
- Best Actor: Ko Hsiang-ting; The Evergreen Mountains
- Best Actress: Gua Ah-leh; Home, Sweet Home
- Most awards: Family Love (4)

The 8th Golden Horse Awards (Chinese: 第8屆金馬獎) took place on October 30, 1970 at Zhongshan Hall in Taipei, Taiwan.

== Winners and nominees ==
Winners are listed first, highlighted in boldface.

**Best Feature Film**: **Home, Sweet Home**; Family Love (runner-up); From the Highway (runner-up); The Evergreen Mountains (runner-up); Love Without End (runner-up)	**Best Documentary**: **He Shan Bing Shou**; Artificial Vertebral Body (runner-up); Confucius (runner-up); Nian San Jie Shi Jie Shao Nian Bang Qiu Sai (runner-up)
**Best News Film**: **World Youth Baseball Championship**; Aftermath of Elsie and Flossie (runner-up); 24th Sports Meet (runner-up); Nigerian President Visit (runner-up); Vietnam War (runner-up); Forced Landing of China Airlines Plane (runner-up)	**Best Director**: **Chang Tseng-chai — From the Highway**
**Best Leading Actor**: **Ko Hsiang-ting — The Evergreen Mountains**	**Best Leading Actress**: **Gua Ah-leh — Home, Sweet Home**
**Best Supporting Actor**: **Yi Ming — Family Love**	**Best Supporting Actress**: **Hsia Tai-feng — Family Love**
**Best Child Star**: **Yu Chien-sheng — Bu Gan Gen Ni Jiang**	**Best Screenplay**: **Lu Chih-tzu — Family Love**
**Best Cinematography - Color**: **Lai Cheng-ying — Stardust**	**Best Film Editing**: **Wang Chin-chen — Home Sweet Home**
**Best Art Direction**: **Kao San-lan — Xing Yun Cao**	**Best Music**: **Chow Lan-ping — From the Highway**
**Best Sound Recording**: **Hung Jui-ting — Stardust**	**Best Cinematography for Documentary**: **Chi Ho-hsi — Confucius**
**Best Planning for Documentary**: **Lau Fong-gong— Wo Ai Guo Qi**	**Special Award - Outstanding Performance**: **Jenny Hu — Love Without End**
**Special Award of National Spirit**: **Secret Agent Chung King No.1**; **Wo Ai Guo Qi**
