= Eight Immortals (film) =

- Film poster
- Directed by: Chan Hung Man
- Written by: Lin Chung-Tzu
- Produced by: Kong Hong
- Starring: Chiang Ming; Sally Chen; Got Heung Ting; Chui Fook Sang; Fung Hoi; Lui Woon Suen; Chan Kwok Gwan; Tsui Yat Gung; Wu Jiaxiang; O Yau Man
- Cinematography: Lin Hung-chung
- Edited by: Wang Chin-Chen
- Music by: Tseng Chung-ying
- Production company: Central Motion Picture Corporation
- Release date: 1971
- Running time: 92 minutes
- Country: Taiwan
- Language: Mandarin

Eight Immortals
- Traditional Chinese: 八仙渡海掃妖魔
- Literal meaning: Eight Immortals Cross the Sea to Sweep Away the Demons
Transcriptions
Standard Mandarin
- Hanyu Pinyin: Bāxiān Dùhǎi Sǎo Yāomó
Yue: Cantonese
- Jyutping: Baat3sin1 Dou6hoi2 Sou3 Jiu2mo1

Eight Immortals (Chinese: 八仙渡海掃妖魔) is a 1971 Taiwanese fantasy film directed by Chan Hung Man. The film tells the story of the Eight Immortals, an octet of warriors in Chinese mythology.

== Cast ==
- Chiang Ming
- Sally Chen
- Got Heung Ting
- Chui Fook Sang
- Fung Hoi
- Lui Woon Suen
- Chan Kwok Gwan
- Tsui Yat Gung
- Wu Jiaxiang
- O Yau Man
