= 1st Golden Horse Awards =

1962 film awards ceremony in Taiwan

- Date: 31 October 1962
- Site: Kuo Kuang Cinema, Taipei, Taiwan
- Hosted by: Wang Yun-wu (Vice Premier)
- Organized by: Taipei Golden Horse Film Festival Executive Committee

Highlights
- Best Feature Film: Sun, Moon and Star
- Best Director: Doe Ching; Les Belles
- Best Actor: Wang Yin; The Pistol
- Best Actress: Lucilla You; Sun, Moon and Star
- Most awards: Sun, Moon and Star (4)

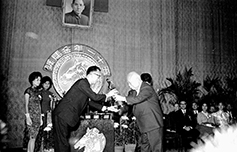
The first Golden Horse Award Ceremony - Shao's film Zou Wenhuai took the stage to receive the award

The 1st Golden Horse Awards (Chinese: 第1屆金馬獎) took place on 31 October 1962 at Kuo Kuang Cinema in Taipei, Taiwan.

== Winners and nominees ==
Winners are listed first, highlighted in boldface.

**Best Feature Film**: **Sun, Moon and Star**; 14000 Witnesses (runner-up); The Magnificent Concubine (runner-up); Under One Roof (runner-up)	**Best Documentary**: **Today's Kinmen**; National Day Military Review (runner-up); Education in Taiwan (runner-up)
**Golden Horse Grant**: **The Orphan of Zhao**; **The Tender Trap of Espionage**; **Tears of Mother**	**Best Director**: **Ching Doe — Les Belles**
**Best Leading Actor**: **Wang Yin — The Pistol**	**Best Leading Actress**: **Lucilla You — Sun, Moon and Star**
**Best Supporting Actor**: **Chung Fu-tsai — Under One Roof**	**Best Supporting Actress**: **Tang Pao-yun — Typhoon**
**Best Child Star**: **Fei Li — The Golden Trumpet**	**Best Screenplay**: **Chun Yik-foo — Sun, Moon and Star**
**Best Cinematography - Color**: **Tony Huang — Sun, Moon and Star**	**Best Cinematography - Black-and-White**: **Hua Hui-ying — Under One Roof**
**Best Film Editing**: **Chiang Hsing-lung — The Magnificent Concubine**	**Best Music**: **Yao Min — Les Belles**
**Best Sound Recording**: **Kuang Hu — The Magnificent Concubine**	**Best Cinematography for Documentary**: **Chi Ho-hsi — Education in Taiwan**
**Best Planning for Documentary**: **Tai Peng-ling — Today's Kinmen**
