= The Ammunition Hunters =

- Film poster
- Traditional Chinese: 落鷹峽
- Simplified Chinese: 落鹰峡
- Literal meaning: Fallen-Eagle Ravine
- Hanyu Pinyin: Luò Yīng Xiá
- Directed by: Ting Shan-hsi
- Written by: George F.H. Chang; Teng Yu-kun
- Produced by: Henry Kung
- Starring: Peter Yang; Chen Chen; Sally Chen; Tsui Fu-sheng; Fuh Bih-huei
- Cinematography: Lin Wen-chin
- Edited by: Shen Yeh-kang
- Music by: Charles Tso
- Production company: Central Motion Picture Corporation
- Release date: July 29, 1971
- Country: Taiwan
- Language: Mandarin

The Ammunition Hunters is a 1971 Taiwanese action film directed by Ting Shan-hsi, starring Peter Yang and Chen Chen.

== Cast ==
- Peter Yang
- Chen Chen
- Sally Chen
- Sun Yueh
- Sit Hon
- Shan Mao
- Ko Hsiang-ting
- O Yau Man
- So Gam Lung
- Tsui Fu-sheng
- Yeung Fui Yuk
- Fuh Bih-huei
