= Tsui Fu-sheng =

Taiwanese actor

Tsui Fu-sheng (Chinese: 崔福生; 8 July 1931 – 26 December 2013) was a Taiwanese actor.

He began acting after completed military service in the Republic of China Air Force. Fu was awarded the Golden Horse for Best Supporting Actor in 1966. His role in The Road was honored with the Golden Horse Award for Best Actor in 1968. At the time of his death, Tsui was in ill health, out of the public eye, and in retirement for two decades. He was hospitalized in September 2013, and later sent home. Tsui fell ill on 25 December 2013, and died the next day, aged 82.

== Selected filmography ==
- Tiao Chan (1967)
- The Ammunition Hunters (1971)
- Execution in Autumn (1972)
- Juedai Shuangjiao (1977)
- If I Were for Real (1981)
- Star Knows My Heart (1983)
- The Heaven Sword and Dragon Saber (1984)
- Daughter of the Nile (1987)
