= The Silent Wife =

1965 film

- Film poster
- Traditional Chinese: 啞女情深
- Simplified Chinese: 哑女情深
- Literal meaning: Mute Girl Has Deep Feelings
- Hanyu Pinyin: Yǎ Nǚ Qíng Shēn
- Directed by: Li Hsing
- Written by: Liu Yi; Chiung Yao
- Produced by: Hu Chien-chung
- Starring: Wang Mo-chou; Ko Chun-hsiung
- Cinematography: Lai Cheng-ying
- Edited by: Chen Hung-min
- Music by: Tso Hung-yuan
- Production company: Central Motion Pictures Corporation
- Release date: 31 December 1965 (Taiwan)
- Running time: 96 minutes
- Country: Taiwan
- Language: Mandarin

The Silent Wife is a 1965 Taiwanese drama film directed by Li Hsing, based on Chiung Yao's 1964 novelette.

== Cast ==
- Wang Mo-chou as Fang Yiyi
- Ko Chun-hsiung as Liu Jingyan

== Awards and nominations ==
1966 4th Golden Horse Awards

- Won—Best Original Score (Tso Hung-yuan)
- Won—Best Sound Effect (Hung Jui-ting)
- Won—Special Acting Award (Wang Mo-chou)
- Nominated—Best Feature Film

1966 Asia-Pacific Film Festival

- Won—Best Adapted Screenplay (Liu Yi)
- Won—Best Cinematography (Lai Cheng-ying)
- Won—Special Acting Award (Wang Mo-chou)

The film was also selected as the Taiwanese entry for the Best Foreign Language Film at the 39th Academy Awards, but was not accepted as a nominee.

== See also ==
- List of submissions to the 39th Academy Awards for Best Foreign Language Film
- List of Taiwanese submissions for the Academy Award for Best Foreign Language Film
