= Golden Horse Award for Best Narrative Feature =

Taiwanese annual film award

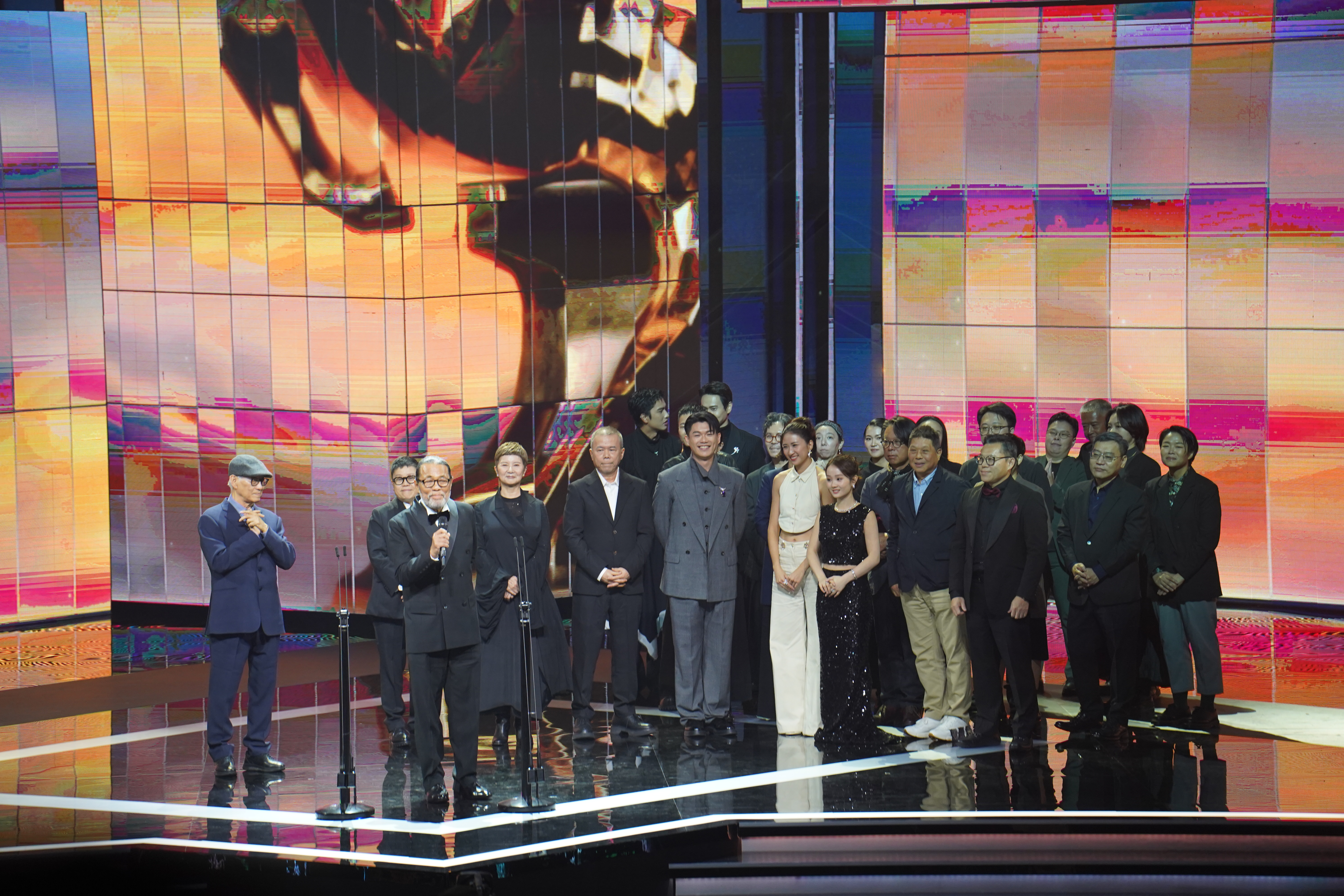
- The 2025 recipient: A Foggy Tale
- Country: Taiwan
- Presented by: Taipei Golden Horse Film Festival Executive Committee
- First award: 1962
- Currently held by: A Foggy Tale (2025)
- Website: goldenhorse.org.tw

The Golden Horse Award for Best Narrative Feature (Chinese: 金馬獎最佳劇情片) is presented annually at Taiwan's Golden Horse Film Awards.

== Winners and nominees ==
Year	English title	Original title	Director(s)	Production country
1962 (1st)	Sun, Moon and Star	星星月亮太陽	Yi Wen	(British Hong Kong)
1962 (1st)	14,000 Witnesses	一萬四千個證人	Hao Wang	(Taiwan) (British Hong Kong)
1962 (1st)	The Magnificent Concubine	楊貴妃	Li Han-hsiang	(British Hong Kong)
1962 (1st)	Under One Roof	宜室宜家	Yao Chung	(Taiwan)
1963 (2nd)	The Love Eterne	梁山伯與祝英台	Li Han Hsiang	(British Hong Kong)
1965 (3rd)	Beautiful Duckling	養鴨人家	Li Hsing	(Taiwan)
1966 (4th)	Hsi-shih, Beauty of Beauties	西施	Li Han Hsiang	(British Hong Kong) (Taiwan)
1967 (5th)	Orchids and My Love	我女若蘭	Lee Chia	(Taiwan)
1968 (6th)	The Road	路	Li Hsing	(Taiwan)
1969 (7th)	Spring in a Small Town	小鎮春回	Yang Wen-gan	(Taiwan)
1970 (8th)	Home Sweet Home	家在臺北	Pai Ching-jui	(Taiwan)
1971 (9th)	The Story of Ti-Ying	緹縈	Li Han Hsiang	(British Hong Kong) (Taiwan)
1972 (10th)	Execution in Autumn	秋决	Li Hsing	(Taiwan)
1973 (11th)	The Escape	忍	Yu Fong-jhih	(British Hong Kong)
1975 (12th)	Land of the Undaunted	吾土吾民	Li Hsing	(Taiwan)
1976 (13th)	Victory	梅花	Liu Jia-Chang	(Taiwan)
1977 (14th)	Heroes of the Eastern Skies	筧橋英烈傳	Chang Tsung-che	(Taiwan)
1978 (15th)	He Never Gives Up	汪洋中的一條船	Li Hsing	(Taiwan)
1979 (16th)	The Story of a Small Town	小城故事	Li Hsing	(Taiwan)
1980 (17th)	Good Morning, Taipei	早安臺北	Li Hsing	(Taiwan)
1981 (18th)	If I Were for Real	假如我是真的	Wang Toon	(Taiwan)
1982 (19th)	The Battle for the Republic of China	辛亥雙十	Ting Shan-hsi	(British Hong Kong) (Taiwan)
1983 (20th)	Growing Up	小畢的故事	Chen Kun-hou	(Taiwan)
1984 (21st)	Old Mao's Second Spring	老莫的第二個春天	Lee You-Ning	(Taiwan)
1985 (22nd)	Kuei-Mei, a Woman	我這樣過了一生	Chang Yi	(Taiwan)
1986 (23rd)	Terrorizers	恐怖份子	Edward Yang	(Taiwan)
1987 (24th)	Straw Man	稻草人	Wang Tung	(Taiwan)
1988 (25th)	Painted Faces	七小福	Alex Law	(British Hong Kong)
1989 (26th)	Full Moon in New York	三個女人的故事	Stanley Kwan	(British Hong Kong)
1990 (27th)	Red Dust	滾滾紅塵	Yim Ho	(British Hong Kong)
1991 (28th)	A Brighter Summer Day	牯嶺街少年殺人事件	Edward Yang	(Taiwan)
1992 (29th)	Hill of No Return	無言的山丘	Wang Tung	(Taiwan)
1993 (30th)	The Wedding Banquet	喜宴	Ang Lee	(Taiwan) (United States)
1994 (31st)	Vive L'Amour	愛情萬歲	Tsai Ming-liang	(Taiwan)
1994 (31st)	Eat Drink Man Woman	飲食男女	Ang Lee	(Taiwan)
1994 (31st)	A Confucian Confusion	獨立時代	Edward Yang	(Taiwan)
1994 (31st)	A Borrowed Life	多桑	Wu Nien-jen	(Taiwan)
1994 (31st)	Red Rose White Rose	紅玫瑰白玫瑰	Stanley Kwan	(British Hong Kong)
1994 (31st)	Chungking Express	重慶森林	Wong Kar-wai	(British Hong Kong)
1995 (32nd)	Summer Snow	女人四十	Ann Hui	(British Hong Kong)
1995 (32nd)	Good Men, Good Women	好男好女	Hou Hsiao-hsien	(Taiwan) (Japan)
1995 (32nd)	Siao Yu	少女小漁	Sylvia Chang	(Taiwan)
1995 (32nd)	The Daughter-in-Law	阿爸的情人	Steve Wang	(Taiwan)
1995 (32nd)	Super Citizen Ko	超級大國民	Wan Jen	(Taiwan)
1995 (32nd)	Tropical Fish	熱帶魚	Chen Yu-hsun	(Taiwan)
1996 (33rd)	In the Heat of the Sun	陽光燦爛的日子	Jiang Wen	(China)
1996 (33rd)	Floating Life	浮生	Clara Law	(Australia)
1996 (33rd)	Tonight Nobody Goes Home	今天不回家	Sylvia Chang	(Taiwan)
1996 (33rd)	Foreign Moon	月滿英倫	Zeming Zhang	(British Hong Kong) (United Kingdom)
1996 (33rd)	The Age of Miracles	鬼婆婆	Peter Chan	(British Hong Kong)
1997 (34th)	Comrades: Almost a Love Story	甜蜜蜜	Peter Chan	(British Hong Kong)
1997 (34th)	The Mad Phoenix	南海十三郎	Clifton Ko	(British Hong Kong)
1997 (34th)	Such a Life	一隻鳥仔哮啾啾	Chang Chi-Yung	(Taiwan)
1997 (34th)	Made in Hong Kong	香港製造	Fruit Chan	(Hong Kong)
1997 (34th)	Wolves Cry Under the Moon	國道封閉	Ho Ping	(Taiwan)
1997 (34th)	The River	河流	Tsai Ming-liang	(Taiwan)
1998 (35th)	Xiu Xiu: The Sent Down Girl	天浴	Joan Chen	(Hong Kong) (United States) (Taiwan)
1998 (35th)	The Personals	徵婚啟事	Chen Kuo-fu	(Taiwan)
1998 (35th)	Who Am I?	我是誰	Benny Chan and Jackie Chan	(Hong Kong)
1998 (35th)	City of Glass	玻璃之城	Mabel Cheung	(Hong Kong)
1998 (35th)	Your Place or Mine!	每天愛你八小時	James Yuen	(Hong Kong)
1998 (35th)	Flowers of Shanghai	海上花	Hou Hsiao-hsien	(Taiwan)
1999 (36th)	Ordinary Heroes	千言萬語	Ann Hui	(Hong Kong)
1999 (36th)	Tempting Heart	心動	Sylvia Chang	(Hong Kong)
1999 (36th)	Victim	目露凶光	Ringo Lam	(Hong Kong)
1999 (36th)	Fly Me to Polaris	星願	Jingle Ma	(Hong Kong)
1999 (36th)	Purple Storm	紫雨風暴	Teddy Chan	(Hong Kong)
1999 (36th)	Darkness and Light	黑暗之光	Chang Tso-chi	(Taiwan)
2000 (37th)	Crouching Tiger, Hidden Dragon	臥虎藏龍	Ang Lee	(Taiwan) (United States) (China)
2000 (37th)	In the Mood for Love	花樣年華	Wong Kar-wai	(Hong Kong)
2000 (37th)	Shadow Magic	西洋镜	Ann Hu	(China) (Germany) (Taiwan) (United States)
2000 (37th)	The Mission	鎗火	Johnnie To	(Hong Kong)
2000 (37th)	The Cabbie	運轉手之戀	Zhang Huakun and Chen Yiwen	(Taiwan)
2000 (37th)	Little Cheung	細路祥	Fruit Chan	(Hong Kong)
2001 (38th)	Durian Durian	榴槤飄飄	Fruit Chan	(Hong Kong) (France) (China)
2001 (38th)	Beijing Bicycle	十七歲的單車	Wang Xiaoshuai	(China) (France) (Taiwan)
2001 (38th)	What Time Is It There?	你那邊幾點	Tsai Ming-liang	(Taiwan) (France)
2001 (38th)	Gimme Gimme	愛上我吧	Lawrence Ah Mon	(Hong Kong)
2001 (38th)	Lan Yu	藍宇	Stanley Kwan	(China) (Hong Kong)
2002 (39th)	The Best of Times	美麗時光	Chang Tso-chi	(Taiwan)
2002 (39th)	Hollywood Hong Kong	香港有個荷里活	Fruit Chan	(Hong Kong)
2002 (39th)	July Rhapsody	男人四十	Ann Hui	(Hong Kong)
2002 (39th)	Three: Going Home	三更之回家	Peter Chan	(Hong Kong)
2002 (39th)	The Runaway Pistol	走火槍	Lam Wah-Chuen	(Hong Kong)
2003 (40th)	Infernal Affairs	無間道	Andrew Lau and Alan Mak	(Hong Kong)
2003 (40th)	The Missing	不見	Lee Kang-sheng	(Taiwan)
2003 (40th)	Goodbye, Dragon Inn	不散	Tsai Ming-liang	(Taiwan)
2003 (40th)	PTU		Johnnie To	(Hong Kong)
2003 (40th)	Blind Shaft	盲井	Li Yang	(China)
2004 (41st)	Kekexili: Mountain Patrol	可可西里	Lu Chuan	(China)
2004 (41st)	Breaking News	大事件	Johnnie To	(Hong Kong)
2004 (41st)	The Moon Also Rises	月光下，我記得	Lin Cheng-sheng	(Taiwan)
2004 (41st)	2046	2046	Wong Kar-wai	(Hong Kong) (China)
2004 (41st)	One Nite in Mongkok	旺角黑夜	Derek Yee	(Hong Kong)
2005 (42nd)	Kung Fu Hustle	功夫	Stephen Chow	(Hong Kong) (China)
2005 (42nd)	A World Without Thieves	天下无贼	Feng Xiaogang	(China)
2005 (42nd)	The Wayward Cloud	天邊一朵雲	Tsai Ming-liang	(Taiwan) (France)
2005 (42nd)	Election	黑社會	Johnnie To	(Hong Kong)
2005 (42nd)	Three Times	最好的時光	Hou Hsiao-hsien	(Taiwan)
2006 (43rd)	After This Our Exile	父子	Patrick Tam	(Hong Kong)
2006 (43rd)	Crazy Stone	瘋狂的石頭	Ning Hao	(China)
2006 (43rd)	Exiled	放·逐	Johnnie To	(Hong Kong)
2006 (43rd)	Silk	詭絲	Su Chao-bin	(Taiwan)
2006 (43rd)	Perhaps Love	如果·愛	Peter Chan	(Hong Kong)
2007 (44th)	Lust, Caution	色，戒	Ang Lee	(United States) (China) (Taiwan) (Hong Kong)
2007 (44th)	What on Earth Have I Done Wrong?!	情非得已之生存之道	Doze Niu	(Taiwan)
2007 (44th)	Getting Home	落葉歸根	Zhang Yang	(China)
2007 (44th)	The Home Song Stories	意	Tony Ayres	(Australia) (Singapore)
2007 (44th)	Eye in the Sky	跟蹤	Yau Nai-hoi	(Hong Kong)
2008 (45th)	The Warlords	投名状	Peter Chan	(China) (Hong Kong)
2008 (45th)	Ocean Flame	一半海水，一半火焰	Liu Fendou	(Hong Kong)
2008 (45th)	Cape No. 7	海角七號	Wei Te-sheng	(Taiwan)
2008 (45th)	Orz Boyz!	囧男孩	Yang Ya-che	(Taiwan)
2008 (45th)	Assembly	集结号	Feng Xiaogang	(China) (Hong Kong)
2009 (46th)	No Puedo Vivir Sin Ti	不能没有你	Leon Dai	(Taiwan)
2009 (46th)	Cow	鬥牛	Guan Hu	(China)
2009 (46th)	Crazy Racer	瘋狂的賽車	Ning Hao	(China)
2009 (46th)	Face	臉	Tsai Ming-liang	(Taiwan) (France) (Netherlands) (Belgium)
2009 (46th)	Like a Dream	如夢	Clara Law	(China) (Taiwan)
2010 (47th)	When Love Comes	當愛來的時候	Chang Tso-chi	(Taiwan)
2010 (47th)	7 Days in Heaven	父後七日	Liu Zi-Jie and Wang Yu-Lin	(Taiwan)
2010 (47th)	Bodyguards and Assassins	十月圍城	Teddy Chan	(Hong Kong) (China)
2010 (47th)	Judge	透析	Jie Liu	(China)
2010 (47th)	The Fourth Portrait	第四張畫	Chung Mong-hong	(Taiwan)
2011 (48th)	Seediq Bale	賽德克‧巴萊	Wei Te-sheng	(Taiwan)
2011 (48th)	Let the Bullets Fly	讓子彈飛	Jiang Wen	(China)
2011 (48th)	A Simple Life	桃姐	Ann Hui	(Hong Kong)
2011 (48th)	Return Ticket	到阜陽六百里	Teng Yung-shin	(China) (Taiwan)
2011 (48th)	The Piano in a Factory	鋼的琴	Zhang Meng	(China)
2012 (49th)	Beijing Blues	神探亨特張	Gao Qunshu	(China)
2012 (49th)	Mystery	浮城謎事	Lou Ye	(China)
2012 (49th)	Life Without Principle	奪命金	Johnnie To	(Hong Kong)
2012 (49th)	Girlfriend, Boyfriend	女朋友。男朋友	Yang Ya-che	(Taiwan)
2012 (49th)	The Bullet Vanishes	消失的子彈	Law Chi-leung	(Hong Kong) (China)
2013 (50th)	Ilo Ilo	爸媽不在家	Anthony Chen	(Singapore)
2013 (50th)	A Touch of Sin	天注定	Jia Zhangke	(China) (Japan) (France)
2013 (50th)	The Grandmaster	一代宗師	Wong Kar-wai	(Hong Kong) (China)
2013 (50th)	Stray Dogs	郊遊	Tsai Ming-liang	(Taiwan) (France)
2013 (50th)	Drug War	毒戰	Johnnie To	(Hong Kong) (China)
2014 (51st)	Blind Massage	推拿	Lou Ye	(China) (France)
2014 (51st)	Black Coal, Thin Ice	白日焰火	Diao Yinan	(China)
2014 (51st)	The Golden Era	黃金時代	Ann Hui	(China) (Hong Kong)
2014 (51st)	Kano	KANO	Umin Boya	(Taiwan)
2014 (51st)	A Fool	一個勺子	Chen Jianbin	(China)
2015 (52nd)	The Assassin	刺客聶隱娘	Hou Hsiao-hsien	(Taiwan) (China) (Hong Kong)
2015 (52nd)	Thanatos, Drunk	醉·生夢死	Chang Tso-chi	(Taiwan)
2015 (52nd)	Port of Call	踏血尋梅	Philip Yung	(Hong Kong)
2015 (52nd)	Tharlo	塔洛	Pema Tseden	(China)
2015 (52nd)	Mountains May Depart	山河故人	Jia Zhangke	(China) (France) (Japan)
2016 (53rd)	The Summer Is Gone	八月	Zhang Dalei	(China)
2016 (53rd)	The Road to Mandalay	再見瓦城	Midi Z	(Taiwan) (Myanmar) (France) (Germany)
2016 (53rd)	Godspeed	一路順風	Chung Mong-hong	(Taiwan)
2016 (53rd)	Trivisa	樹大招風	Frank Hui, Jevons Au and Vicky Wong	(Hong Kong)
2016 (53rd)	I Am Not Madame Bovary	我不是潘金蓮	Feng Xiaogang	(China)
2017 (54th)	The Bold, the Corrupt, and the Beautiful	血觀音	Yang Ya-che	(Taiwan)
2017 (54th)	Free and Easy	輕鬆+愉快	Geng Jun	(China)
2017 (54th)	The Great Buddha +	大佛普拉斯	Huang Hsin-yao	(Taiwan)
2017 (54th)	Love Education	相愛相親	Sylvia Chang	(China)
2017 (54th)	Angels Wear White	嘉年華	Vivian Qu	(China)
2018 (55th)	An Elephant Sitting Still	大象席地而坐	Hu Bo	(China)
2018 (55th)	Long Day's Journey into Night	地球最後的夜晚	Bi Gan	(China)
2018 (55th)	Dear Ex	誰先愛上他的	Mag Hsu, Hsu Chih-yen	(Taiwan)
2018 (55th)	Shadow	影	Zhang Yimou	(China)
2018 (55th)	Dying to Survive	我不是藥神	Wen Muye	(China)
2019 (56th)	A Sun	陽光普照	Chung Mong-hong	(Taiwan)
2019 (56th)	Suk Suk	叔．叔	Ray Yeung	(Hong Kong)
2019 (56th)	The Garden of Evening Mists	夕霧花園	Tom Shu-yu Lin	(Malaysia)
2019 (56th)	Wet Season	熱帶雨	Anthony Chen	(Singapore)
2019 (56th)	Detention	返校	John Hsu	(Taiwan)
2020 (57th)	My Missing Valentine	消失的情人節	Chen Yu-hsun	(Taiwan)
2020 (57th)	Hand Rolled Cigarette	手捲煙	Chan Kin-long	(Hong Kong)
2020 (57th)	Days	日子	Tsai Ming-liang	(Taiwan)
2020 (57th)	Classmates Minus	同學麥娜絲	Huang Hsin-yao	(Taiwan)
2020 (57th)	Dear Tenant	親愛的房客	Cheng Yu-chieh	(Taiwan)
2021 (58th)	The Falls	瀑布	Chung Mong-hong	(Taiwan)
2021 (58th)	Drifting	濁水漂流	Jun Li	(Hong Kong)
2021 (58th)	The Soul	缉魂	Cheng Wei-hao	(Taiwan) (China)
2021 (58th)	American Girl	美國女孩	Fiona Roan Feng-i	(Taiwan)
2021 (58th)	Till We Meet Again	月老	Giddens Ko	(Taiwan)
2022 (59th)	Coo-Coo 043	一家子兒咕咕叫	Chan Ching-lin	(Taiwan)
2022 (59th)	Incantation	咒	Kevin Ko	(Taiwan)
2022 (59th)	Gaga	哈勇家	Laha Mebow	(Taiwan)
2022 (59th)	Limbo	智齒	Cheang Pou-soi	(Hong Kong)
2022 (59th)	The Sunny Side of the Street	白日青春	Lau Kok-rui	(Hong Kong)
2023 (60th)	Stonewalling	石門	Huang Ji, Ryuji Otsuka	(Japan)
2023 (60th)	Marry My Dead Body	關於我和鬼變成家人的那件事	Cheng Wei-hao	(Taiwan)
2023 (60th)	Time Still Turns the Pages	年少日記	Nick Cheuk	(Hong Kong)
2023 (60th)	Eye of the Storm	疫起	Lin Chun-yang	(Taiwan)
2023 (60th)	Snow in Midsummer	五月雪	Chong Keat Aun	(Malaysia) (Singapore) (Taiwan)
2024 (61st)	An Unfinished Film	一部未完成的电影	Lou Ye	(Singapore) (Germany)
2024 (61st)	All Shall Be Well	從今以後	Ray Yeung	(Hong Kong)
2024 (61st)	Stranger Eyes	默視錄	Yeo Siew Hua	(Taiwan) (Singapore) (France) (United States)
2024 (61st)	Dead Talents Society	徐漢強	John Hsu	(Taiwan)
2024 (61st)	Bel Ami	漂亮朋友	Geng Jun	(France)
2025 (62nd)	A Foggy Tale	大濛	Chen Yu-hsun	(Taiwan)
2025 (62nd)	The Waves Will Carry Us	人生海海	Lau Kek-huat	(Taiwan) (Malaysia)
2025 (62nd)	Left-Handed Girl	左撇子女孩	Shih-Ching Tsou	(Taiwan) (France) (United Kingdom) (United States)
2025 (62nd)	Queerpanorama	眾生相	Jun Li	(Taiwan)
2025 (62nd)	Mother Bhumi	地母	Chong Keat Aun	(Malaysia) (Italy)

Note: There were no Golden Horse Film Awards held in 1964 or 1974.
