= Tse Ling-ling =

Taiwanese-born actress (born 1965)

- Born: 謝正陸; 20 September 1956 (age 70); Taiwan
- Education: Chinese Culture University
- Occupations: Child star, actress, businesswoman
- Years active: 1964－1980
- Spouse(s): Peter Lam (1980－1995)
- Children: Lester; Emily Lam Ho; Evelyn; Lucas (twins); Eleanor Lam (twins)
- Awards: 4th Golden Horse Film Festival and Awards; Best Child Star 1965 5th Golden Horse Film Festival and Awards; Best Child Star 1966

Chinese name
- Traditional Chinese: 謝玲玲
- Simplified Chinese: 谢玲玲
Transcriptions

Tse Ling-ling (Chinese: 謝玲玲, born on 20 September 1956), or Hsieh Ling-ling, is a Taiwanese-born child star and the ex-wife of Hong Kong billionaire Peter Lam.

== Biography ==
Tse starred in five movies from 1977 to 1979 as a child actor. She appears in The New Heaven Sword and Dragon Sabre (1986) and TV show Requiem of Ling Sing (1989). Her work in the 1977 film Tiger & Crane Fists was re-used in the 2002 film Kung Pow: Enter the Fist, which consists mostly of archive material from the earlier film.

== Personal life ==
In 1980, Tse married Hong Kong billionaire Peter Lam. The couple had 5 children: Lester, Emily, Evelyn, Eleanor and Lucas, where Eleanor and Lucas are mixed twins. Tse got along very well with her parents-in-law Lim Por-yen and U Po-chu. Tse and Lam divorced in 1995.

== Filmography ==
- Orchids and My Love (1966)
- Shao Lin hu ho chen tien hsia a.k.a. The Savage Killers (USA) a.k.a. Tiger & Crane Fists (1977)
- Yue meng long niao meng long (1978)
- Story in the Temple Red Lily (1979)
- The Wild Goose on the Wing (1979)
- Du mei gui yu da bao biao a.k.a. Poison Rose and The Bodyguard (1979)
- Kung Pow: Enter the Fist (2002)
