= Ou Wei =

Taiwanese actor

Ou Wei (Chinese: 歐威; 16 September 1937 – December 1973) was a Taiwanese actor.

Ou Wei was born Huang Huang-chi (黃煌基) in present-day Xinhua District, Tainan, on 16 September 1937. His father, a billboard painter, died when Huang was five years old. His formal education ended after middle school. Huang worked for the police before leaving to pursue acting. He found that theatre did not suit him, and as such he joined director's Ho Chi-ming's film studio. Huang made his Hokkien film debut in 1957, and took his stage name, Ou Wei, from the character he portrayed in Green Mountain Bloodshed, a historical drama about the rebellion of a tribe of Taiwanese aborigines against Japanese rule. While Ou Wei served in the Republic of China Air Force from 1958 to 1961, Ho Chi-ming had closed his film studio in 1959. Ou Wei then became a freelance actor and worked with Ho Chi-ming's brother Ho Lin-ming, among others.

In his return to acting, Ou Wei appeared in several Mandarin films. During the 1960s, he worked for both the Central Motion Picture Corporation and Shaw Brothers Studio. Ou Wei received his first Golden Horse Award for Best Actor in 1964. Five years later, Ou Wei appeared in the first film made by Tachung Motion Picture Company, a studio founded by former CMPC director Lee Hsing. In 1972, Ou Wei starred in Execution in Autumn, and was again named the Golden Horse Best Actor winner. In a sixteen-year acting career, Ou Wei portrayed over one hundred roles. He wrote a number of screenplays, and released his final work, The Big Raid, in which he was writer, producer, actor, and director, in 1973. He died of kidney disease in December of that year.

Within the Yang Kui Literature Memorial Museum, there is an exhibit dedicated to Ou Wei.

== Selected filmography ==
- Beautiful Duckling (1965)
- Execution in Autumn (1972)
