= Ko Hsiang-ting =

Taiwanese actor (1916–2010)

Ko Hsiang-ting (Chinese: 葛香亭; 8 August 1916 – 16 May 2010) was a Taiwanese actor.

Born in Suzhou, China on 8 August 1916, Ko became a member of the National Revolutionary Army corps of entertainers. He moved to Taiwan after the Chinese Civil War, and started an acting career that spanned over one hundred credits. He was awarded the Golden Horse Award for Best Actor in 1965 and again in 1970. Eight years later, Ko founded the Actor's Union of the Republic of China. In 2005, he was honored with the Golden Horse Award Lifetime Achievement Award.

He died in Taipei on 16 May 2010, aged 93.

== Selected filmography ==
- Beautiful Duckling (1965)
- Orchids and My Love (1966)
- Tiao Chan (1967)
- The Ammunition Hunters (1971)
- Execution in Autumn (1972)
- The Story of a Small Town (1979)
- If I Were for Real (1981)
- Temptress Moon (1996)
- The Opium War (1997)
