= Chang Yung-hsiang =

Taiwanese screenwriter and director (1929–2021)

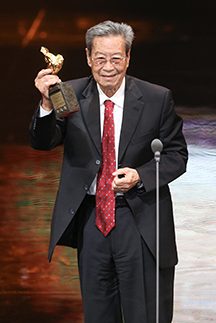
- Born: 26 October 1929; Yantai, Shandong, China
- Died: 8 October 2021 (aged 91); Los Angeles, California, United States
- Education: Fu Hsing Kang College
- Awards: Golden Horse Awards – Best Screenplay; 1972 Indebted for Life and Love; 1975 Land of the Undaunted; 1978 He Never Gives Up; Best Original Screenplay; 1979 The Story of a Small Town; Best Adapted Screenplay; 1981 If I Were for Real; Lifetime Achievement Award; 2016

Chinese name
- Traditional Chinese: 張永祥
- Simplified Chinese: 张永祥
Transcriptions
Standard Mandarin
- Hanyu Pinyin: Zhāng Yǒngxiáng

Chang Yung-hsiang (26 October 1929 – 8 October 2021) was a Taiwanese screenwriter and director originally from Yantai, China, generally considered one of the most prolific and successful screenwriters in Taiwan.

Chang adapted a number of Chiung Yao novels for film. He received six Golden Horse Awards over the course of his career. In 2016, Chang became the first screenwriter to receive the Golden Horse for lifetime achievement. Among Chang's other awards is the 1976 National Award for the Arts. He died in Los Angeles, California on 8 October 2021.

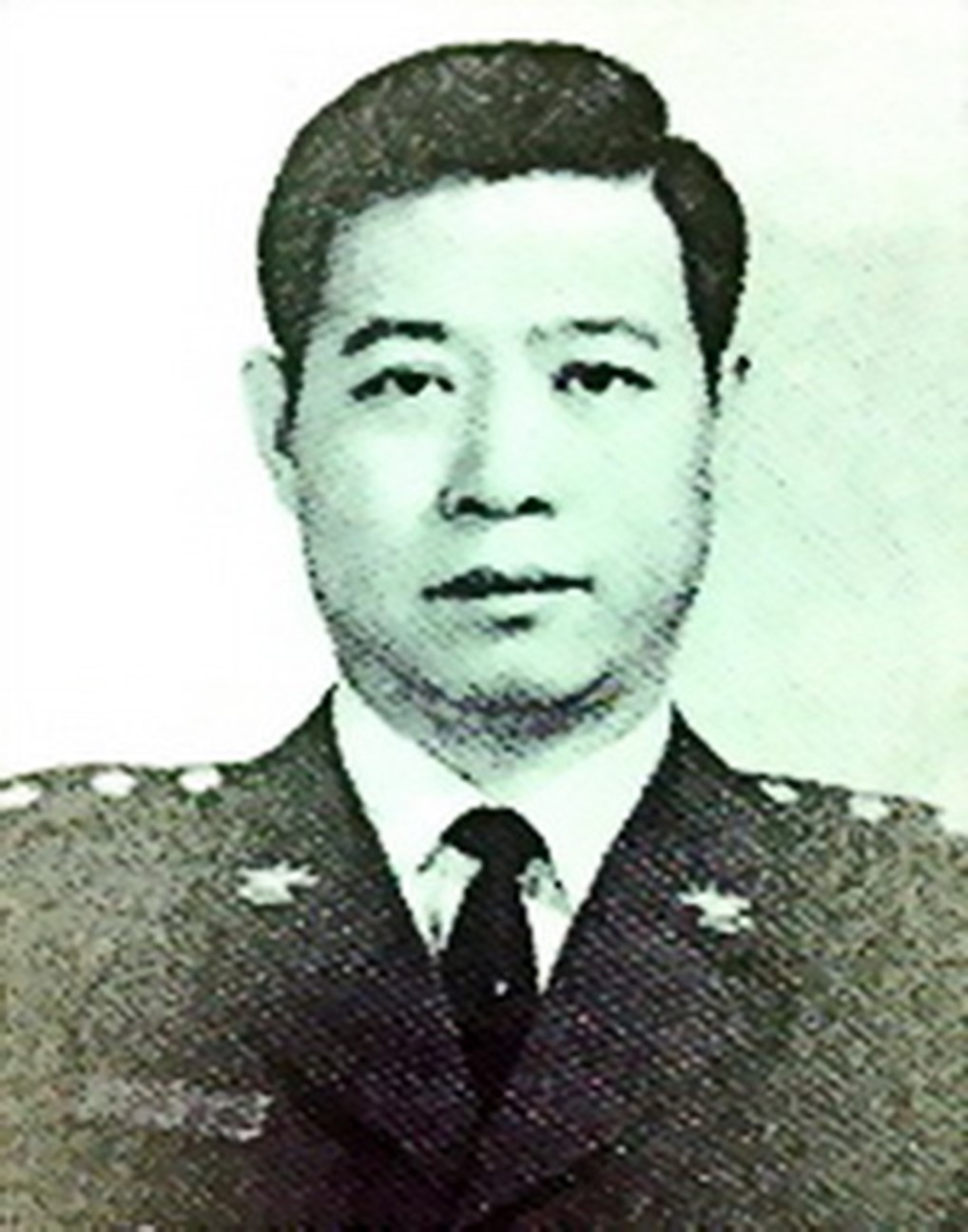
Headshot of Chang in military uniform, taken during his time as the chair of the Department of Cinema and Drama at Fu Hsing Kang College.

== Filmography ==
=== Films ===
- Parent's Love (1964)
- Beautiful Duckling (1965)
- The Bridge (1966)
- Fire Bulls (1966)
- Orchids and My Love (1966)
- Lonely Seventeen (1967)
- The Road (1967)
- Tiao Chan (1967)
- Sun Rise, Sun Set (1967)
- Men of the Skies (1967)
- The Heron Garden (1968)
- Because of Love (1968)
- Morning Mist (1968)
- Black Invitation (1969)
- The Melody of Love (1969)
- Jade Goddess (1969)
- Accidental Trio (1969)
- Storm Over the Yang-Tse River (1969)
- Home Sweet Home (1970)
- Four Moods (1970)
- The Unforgotten Ones (1970)
- Goodbye Darling (1970)
- Stardust (1970)
- From Home with Love (1970)
- The Fake Tycoon (1971)
- The Playful Girl (1971)
- Esquire Hotel (1971)
- Indebted for Life and Love (1971)
- A Kiss to Remember (1972)
- The Gallant (1972)
- The Naughty Couples (1972)
- Mysterious of Jewelly (1972)
- Execution in Autumn (1972)
- Blood Splashing Over Rainbow Bridge (1972)
- Love Is an Elusive Wind (1972)
- The Jilted (1973)
- Seven to One (1973)
- Walking in the Rain (1973)
- The Young Ones (1973)
- Double Dealing with Love (1973)
- Heart with a Million Knots (1973)
- How Is the Weather Today (1973)
- Story of Mother (1973)
- Little Big Boss (1973)
- The Colorful Ripples (1974)
- Yellow Faced Tiger (1974)
- Girl Friend (1974)
- Ghost of the Mirror (1974)
- Where the Seagull Flies (1974)
- The Marriage (1974)
- The Three Tales (1974)
- Star Star Star (1974)
- My Father, My Husband, My Son (1974)
- The Choice of Love (1974)
- The Chinese Amazons (1975)
- Run Lover Run (1975)
- The Life God (1975)
- Thou Shall Not Kill ... But Once (1975)
- Land of the Undaunted (1975)
- Picking the Star (1975)
- 24 Hours Romance (1975)
- Fantasies Behind the Pearly Curtain (1975)
- Heroes Behind the Enemy Lines (1975)
- Fragrant Flower Versus Noxious Grass (1975)
- Forever My Love (1976)
- The Chasing Game (1976)
- Rhythm of the Wave (1976)
- Posterity and Perplexity (1976)
- The Morning Date (1976)
- A Happy Affair (1976)
- Snapping of Love (1976)
- Painted Waves of Love (1976)
- Autumn Love Song (1976)
- The Sang Sisters (1976)
- Starting Tonight (1976)
- Come Fly with Me (1976)
- Game of Love (1976)
- My Sweet Love (1977)
- Cloud of Romance (1977)
- At the Side of Sky-Line (1977)
- There's No Place Like Home (1977)
- The Naval Commandos (1977)
- Confused Love (1977)
- A Pirate of Love (1977)
- Love Rings a Bell (1977)
- Love in the Shadow (1977)
- The Diary of Di-Di (1977)
- The Smiling Face (1977)
- The Glory of the Sunset (1977)
- Melody from Heaven (1977)
- It's Sunset Again (1978)
- Everywhere Birds Are Singing (1978)
- The Spring Lake (1978)
- Misty Love (1978)
- A Voluntary Act (1978)
- A Sorrowful Wedding (1979)
- In the Beginning (1979)
- The Choice of Love (1979)
- No-one Can Touch Her (1979)
- He Never Gives Up (1979)
- Touch of Fairlady (1979)
- My Native Land (1980)
- The Story of Green House (1980)
- Another Spring (1980)
- Poor Chasers (1980)
- The Pioneers (1980)
- The Story of a Small Town (1980)
- Part Time Job (1980)
- The Women Soldiers (1981)
- On the Society File of Shanghai (1981)
- The Land of the Brave (1981)
- Twin Troubles (1981)
- If I Were for Real (1981)
- The Sexy Lady Driver (1982)
- Pink Thief (1982)
- The Girl Robber and I (1982)
- Kill for Love (1982)
- Devil Returns (1982)
- One Stripe Two Stars (1982)
- Temptation (1983)
- Ah-Yuan My Son (1983)
- Women Warriors of Kinmen (1983)
- The Wheel of Life (1984)
- The Warmth of an Old House (1984)
- Finding the Way (1984)
- The Pawned Wife (1985)
- Echo of Sea (1986)

=== Television ===
- The Seven Heroes and Five Gallants (1994) — Episodes 56–61

== Works translated to English ==
- Autumn Execution, translated by Yu Jenchang and David Steelman, The Chinese PEN, Autumn 1977: This is the screenplay of the 1972 film Execution in Autumn.
