= Execution in Autumn =

1972 film

- Film poster
- Directed by: Hsing Lee
- Written by: Chang Yung-hsiang
- Produced by: Hu Shing-ting
- Starring: Ou Wei; Tang Pao-yun; Shao Ching Chou; Fu Bi-hui; Su Han
- Cinematography: Lai Cheng-ying
- Edited by: Chen Hung-Min
- Music by: Ichirō Saitō
- Production companies: Central Motion Picture Corporation; Ta Chung Motion Picture Co.
- Release date: 14 February 1972 (Taiwan)
- Running time: 99 minutes
- Country: Taiwan
- Language: Mandarin

Execution in Autumn (Chinese: 秋決; pinyin: Qiu Jue) is a 1972 Taiwanese drama film directed by Hsing Lee. The film was selected as the Taiwanese entry for the Best Foreign Language Film at the 45th Academy Awards, but was not accepted as a nominee.

== Cast ==
- Ou Wei as Wei Pang
- Tang Pao-yun as Lien Erh
- Shao Ching Chou as Hsing Tao
- Fu Bi-hui as Liao Nai-nai
- Su Han as Pei Hsun
- Ko Hsiang-ting as Stockade Governor Lao Tao
- Hsiang Li as Chan Tao
- Hui Lou Chen as Thief
- Tsui Fu-sheng as County Magistrate

== See also ==
- List of submissions to the 45th Academy Awards for Best Foreign Language Film
- List of Taiwanese submissions for the Academy Award for Best Foreign Language Film
