= Beautiful Duckling =

- Film poster

Chinese name
- Traditional Chinese: 養鴨人家
Transcriptions
- Directed by: Li Hsing
- Written by: Chang Yung-hsiang
- Produced by: James Shen
- Starring: Tang Pao-yun; Ko Hsiang-ting; Ou Wei
- Cinematography: Lai Cheng-ying
- Edited by: Shen Yeh-Kang
- Music by: Lo Ming-Tao
- Production company: Central Motion Picture Corporation
- Release date: 20 May 1965 (Taiwan)
- Running time: 119 minutes
- Country: Taiwan
- Language: Chinese

Beautiful Duckling (Chinese: 養鴨人家; pinyin: Yang ya ren jia) is a 1965 Taiwanese film directed by Li Hsing. It tells the story of a duck farmer named Lin Tsai-tien (Ko Hsiang-ting) and his adopted daughter Hsiao-yue (Tang Pao-yun). The film is one of the representative works of "Healthy Realism" film in Taiwan, which were Kuomintang-backed representations of traditional Chinese ethics. It received three Golden Horse Awards, including wins for Best Picture, Best Director and Best Cinematography.

== Plot ==
Beautiful Duckling tells the story of a duck farmer named Lin Tsai-tien (Ko Hsiang-ting) and his adopted daughter Hsiao-yue (Tang Pao-yun). Hsiao-yue's parents died when she was young, though she knows nothing about her real descent, which Lin has hidden from her. Her natural brother Chao-fu (Ou Wei) is a good-for-nothing Taiwanese opera actor. He keeps asking Lin for money, and threatens to reveal Lin's secret to Hsiao-yue if he does not comply. Chao-fu brings Hsiao-yue to his theatrical troupe, where Hsiao-yue eventually learns about her parents. Meanwhile, Lin has to sell all his ducks to give Chao-fu the requested money. He entrusts Hsiao-yue to Chao-fu, and gives Chao-fu enough money to start his own business. At the end of the film, Lin's son comes back, and Chao-fu, repenting of his behavior, returns the money to Lin.

== Cast ==
- Tang Pao-yun as Hsiao-yue
- Ko Hsiang-ting as Lin Tsai-tien
- Ou Wei as Chao-fu
