= Alan Tam filmography =

This article contains the filmography of Alan Tam.

== Films ==
Year	Film title	Chinese title	Role	Notes
1964	The Student Prince	學生王子		
1976	Let's Rock	大家樂		
1976	Gonna Get You	溫拿與教授	Himself	
1978	Making It	追趕跑跳碰	Alan / Liang Shih Hua	
1979	A Girl Without Sorrow	草愛忘		
1979	A Love Retarded	誤我青春三十年		
1979	The Funny Couple	結婚三級跳		
1980	Going Up Anybody	東追西趕跑跳碰		
1980	Poor Chasers	戀愛反斗星	Fang Rui	
1980	Part Time Job	學生哥		
1980	Love Me, Love Me Not	錯體情		
1980	Flower Just Smile in the Spring Breeze	花伴舞春風		
1981	Spring Fever	佻皮俏冤家		
1981	The Merry Couple	歡喜冤家		
1981	Lucky By Chance	溫拿五虎		
1981	If I Were for Real	假如我是真的		
1982	Devil Returns	凶劫		
1982	Girl with a Gun	神勇女煞星	Jimmy	
1982	It Takes Two	難兄難弟	Shampoo Boy	
1982	Till Death Do We Scare	小生怕怕	Bruce Sit	
1982	My Darling, My Goddess	愛人女神	Ah Kok	
1982	All the Corl One's Men	百分滿點		
1983	Esprit d'amour	陰陽錯	Koo Chi Ming	
1983	Play Catch	少爺威威	Elflynn Lo	
1984	Exposed to Danger	冷眼殺機		
1984	The Other Side of Gentleman	君子好逑	Alan Ng	
1984	My Sentimental Little Friend	多情種	Himself (cameo)	
1985	Mummy Dearest	四眼仔	Alan Lee Kam Lun	
1985	Affectionately Yours	花仔多情	Alan Cheung	
1985	Kung Hei Fat Choy	恭喜發財	Money God	
1986	Lucky Stars Go Places	最佳福星	Top Dog	
1986	My Family	八喜臨門	Theatre audience	
1986	The Story Behind the Concert	歌者戀歌		
1986	The Strange Bedfellow	兩公婆八條心	Himself (cameo)	
1986	100 Ways to Murder Your Wife	殺妻二人組	Himself (cameo)	
1987	Armour of God	龍兄虎弟	Alan/ singer	
1987	You're My Destiny	用愛捉伊人	Tempo	
1987	Rich and Famous	江湖情	Mak Ying Hung	
1987	Crackdown Mission		Jimmy (Girl with a Gun, Archive footage)	
1987	Trouble Couples	開心勿語	Producer	
1988	The Romancing Star II	精裝追女仔之2	Himself in an elevator (cameo)	
1988	The Dragon Family	龍之家族	Allan	
1988	Love Soldier of Fortune	愛的逃兵	Antonio Go	
1988	Woman Prison	女子監獄	Producer	
1989	Casino Raiders	至尊無上	Sam Law	
1989	Little Cop	小小小警察	Mental hospital Head	
1990	The Fortune Code	富貴兵團	Robin	
1990	No Risk, No Gain	至尊計狀元才	Ray	AKA Casino Raiders 2
1990	Pantyhose Hero	脂粉雙雄	Alan / Gaykey	
1991	The Last Blood	驚天12小時	Lui Tai	AKA Hard Boiled 2
1991	Alan & Eric: Between Hello and Goodbye	雙城故事	Alan Tam	
1991	The Banquet	豪門夜宴	cameo	
1992	Once Upon a Time a Hero in China	黃飛鴻笑傳	Master Wong Fei Hung	
1992	Full Contact	俠盜高飛	Singer	
1993	The Tigers - The Legend of Canton	廣東五虎之鐵拳無敵孫中山	Alan To	
1993	Master Wong Vs Master Wong	黃飛鴻對黃飛鴻	Wong Fei Hung	
1996	Twinkle Twinkle Lucky Star (Yun cai zhi li xing)	運財智叻星	King of Heaven	
1996	The Age of Miracles	麻麻帆帆	Sheung Fan	
1997	97 Aces Go Places	最佳拍檔之醉街拍檔	Ho Sik / Ho Sik's Father (2 Roles)	
2001	Merry-Go-Round	初戀拿喳麵	Producer	
2003	Men Suddenly in Black	大丈夫	Himself (cameo)	
2004	Jiang Hu	江湖	Producer	
2006	We Are Family	左麟右李之我愛醫家人	Huang Jinlun / 3 other roles	
2010	Fortune King Is Coming to Town!	財緣萬歲		
2011	Sleepless Fashion	與時尚同居	Alex	
2011	72 Martyrs	英雄喋血	Huang Ying	AKA 72 Heroes
2011	East Meets West	東成西就2011	The Wynner	
2013	I Love Hong Kong 2013	2013 我愛HK恭囍發財	Sung Chi Hung	
2016	Fooling Around Jiang Hu	江湖悲劇		
2018	Agent Mr Chan			
