= If I Were for Real =

- Chinese: 假如我是真的
Transcriptions
Standard Mandarin
- Hanyu Pinyin: Jiǎrú Wǒ Shì Zhēnde

If I Were for Real may refer to:

- If I Were for Real (play), a 1979 Chinese play by Sha Yexin, Li Shoucheng and Yao Mingde
- If I Were for Real (film), a 1981 Taiwanese film directed by Wang Toon, based on the play
- If I Were for Real (album), a 1981 Mandopop album by Teresa Teng, whose title track was the theme song of the film
