= Wang Toon =

Taiwanese director

- 王童
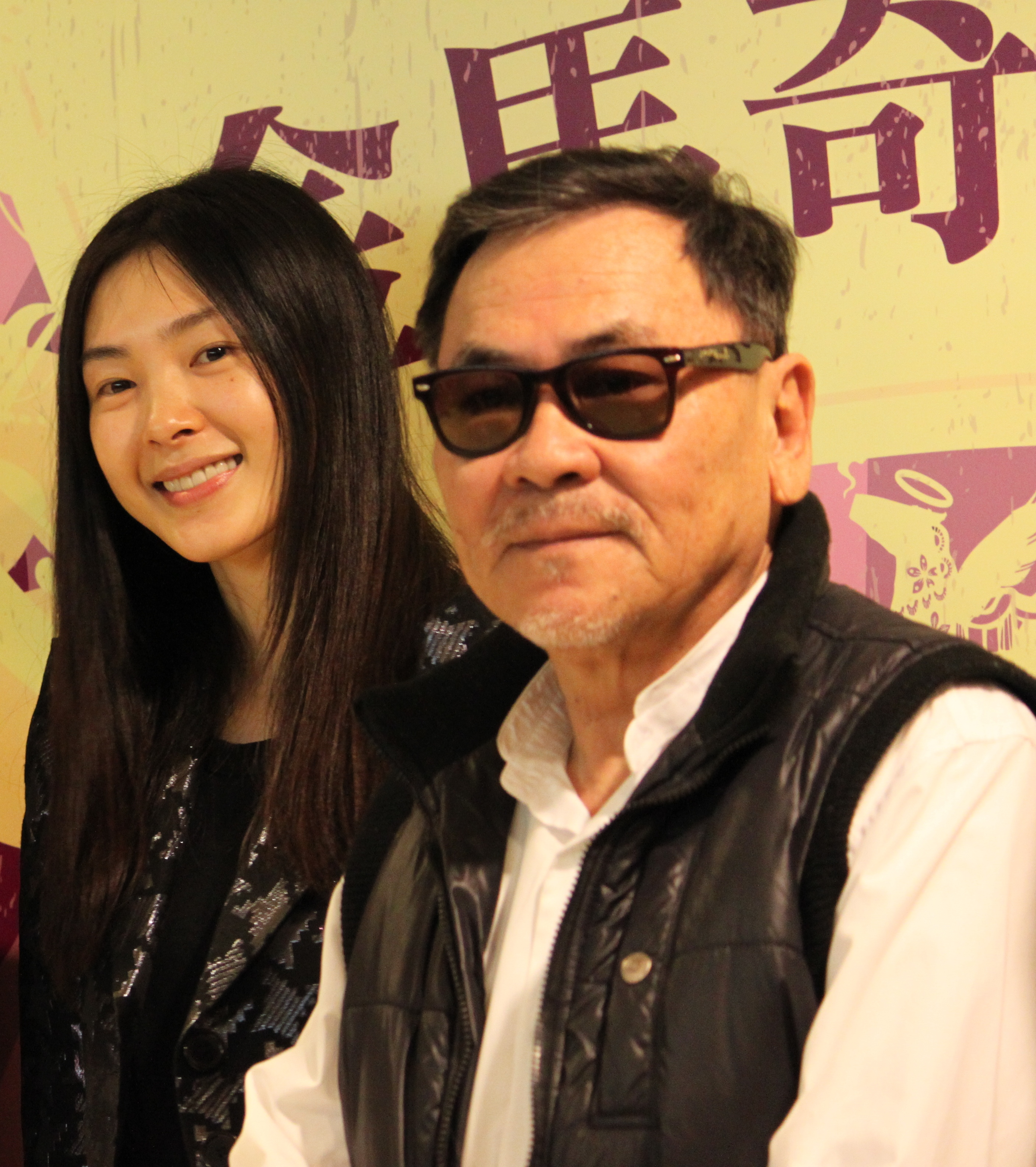
- Wang Toon (right) in 2012
- Born: April 14, 1942 (age 84); Anhui, China
- Occupations: Film director; art director; production designer
- Notable work: Strawman (1987)

Wang Toon (born Wáng Zhōnghé, April 14, 1942), sometimes credited as Wang Tong, is a Taiwanese filmmaker. He started his career as an art director and production designer and later became a film director and educator.

Wang began his career in 1966 working at the Central Motion Picture Corporation in the art and costume design department. He won a Golden Horse Award for Best Art Direction for Forever My Love (Chinese: 楓葉情, 1976), directed by Pai Ching-jui.

In 1981, Wang directed his first feature film, If I Were for Real. It won four Golden Horse Awards, including Best Narrative Feature, Best Leading Actress, Best Supporting Actress and Best Adapted Screenplay at the 18th Golden Horse Awards that year.

Between 1981 and 2015, Wang directed 13 feature films, two animated feature films, and one documentary. For his achievements and decades-long contribution to Taiwanese cinema, he was presented the Golden Horse Lifetime Achievement Award in 2019.

A devout educator, Wang took a teaching position in the Department of Filmmaking at the Taipei National University of the Arts in 2007. He served as the chair from 2010 to 2013, and then from 2017 to 2019. He retired from the university in 2019 and was awarded the Art Education Contribution Award (藝術教育貢獻獎) by the Ministry of Education in 2022.

== Life and career ==
Wang Tong was born Wang Zhonghe in Anhui in 1942. He moved to Taiwan with his family in 1949 due to the Chinese Civil War. Wang studied at the National Taiwan Academy of Arts (國立藝術專科學校) from 1962 to 1965, under the guidance of teachers such as Long Sihliang (龍思良), Gao Yifeng and Wu Yaozong (吳耀宗). When he was young, Wang was nourished by inspiring journals, such as Juchang (劇場; Theatre Magazine) and Wenxue jikan (文學季刊; Literature Magazine), and his association with contemporary poets and painters, including Chen Yingzhen and Wei Tiancong (尉天聰), and Huang Chunming (黃春明) at Cafe Astoria (明星咖啡館). It was there that Wang Tong read the manuscript of the novel Days of Watching the Sea (看海的日子) by Huang Chun-ming, which he later adapted into a popular feature film A Flower in The Raining Night (1983).

Wang received his first opportunity in 1963 after joining Yuan Qiufeng (袁秋楓)'s production of Songfest (1963) as an art assistant. Realizing that he was good at art design, and that he could earn more than his classmates who were working as art teachers, Wang decided to stay working in the film industry. Wang joined the Central Motion Picture Corporation in 1966, where he was mentored by Johnson Tsao Chuang-Sheng (曹莊生) on various aspects of film production and production design. During this time, he gained experience working as an art director for films by Lee Hsing, Ting Shan-hsi, Pai Ching-jui, Sung Tsun-shou and Richard Chen Yao-chi (陳耀圻). He also seized whatever opportunities he could to learn from other directors he admired, such as Li Han-hsiang and King Hu to polish his production skills.

In 1981, Wang made his debut feature film, If I Were for Real, while continuing to work as an art director for his own films and for other directors. Two years later, he directed A Flower in the Rainy Night (1983), an adaptation of Huang Chun-ming's novel, Days of Watching the Sea (看海的日子). The film was a box office success and won two Golden Horse Awards: Lu Hsiao-fen for Best Leading Actress and Ying Ying (英英) for Best Supporting Actress.

Wang's next directorial effort was the wuxia film Run Away (策馬入林; 1984). It was praised for its realistic style, relative to similar productions from the 1960s and 1970s. His next film, Spring Daddy (1985) was about a family consisting of a mainland veteran father and a Taiwanese mother, a social phenomenon depicted in many 1980s Taiwanese films.

Wang subsequently made three films about Taiwan's history from the colonial time of the 1920s to the civil war between the nationalist and communist parties in the mid 20th century: Strawman (1987), Banana Paradise (1989), and Hill of No Return (1992). These films, all realistic depictions of the life experiences of local Taiwanese and mainland immigrants, are also known as Wang's Taiwan trilogy. Red Persimmon (紅柿子, 1995) was an autobiographical film based on his childhood memories. Wang's 12th feature A Way We Go (自由門神, 2002) was a contemporary dark comedy about three socially marginalized young men in globalized urban Taipei. After a 13-year hiatus from directing, Wang returned with Where the Wind Settles (2015), which told the story of a group of mainland refugees forming a new family in Taipei after 1949.

Wang is also involved in the production of animated films. In 2002, he joined Wang Film Productions Co. Ltd. (宏廣股份有限公司), founded by his elder brother Wang Zhong-yuan (王中元). He directed Fire Ball (2005), an adaptation of Chinese novel Journey to the West. The film won Best Animated Feature at the 42nd Golden Horse Awards and Best Animated Feature at the 50th Asia-Pacific Film Festival. The other film, A Story about Grandpa Lin Wang, never came to fruition.

Wang was promoted to be the director of Central Motion Picture Corporation Studio (中影製片廠) in 1997. Under his helm, the company established the first and exclusive high-tech post-production studio in Taiwan's film industry, with synchronous recording cameras, lighting equipment, and computer editing capacity. Wang also established Taiwan's first Dolby recording studio, Central Motion Pictures Corporation Dolby Recording (中影杜比錄音室). At the same time, he also worked as the chairman of the Taipei Film Festival from 1997 to 2002. In 2003, when he served as the CEO of the executive committee of the Golden Horse Awards (臺北金馬影展執行委員會), Wang established the Golden Horse Film Project Promotion (金馬創投) which brings regional and international industry professionals to Taiwan with the purpose of developing international joint ventures and cross-productions.

Wang was also devoted to education. He took a teaching position in the Department of Filmmaking at the Taipei National University of the Arts in 2007 and served as the chair from 2010 to 2013 and 2017 to 2019. After retiring from the university in 2019, Wang was presented the Art Education Contribution Award (藝術教育貢獻獎) by the Ministry of Education in 2022.

== Filmography ==
Feature film
Year	Chinese title	English title
1981	假如我是真的	If I Were for Real
1981	窗口的月亮不准看	Don't Look at The Moon Through The Window
1982	百分滿點	One Hundred Point
1982	苦戀	Portrait of A Fanatic
1983	看海的日子	A Flower in The Raining Night
1984	策馬入林	Run Away
1985	陽春老爸	Spring Daddy
1987	稻草人	Straw Man
1989	香蕉天堂	Banana Paradise
1992	無言的山丘	Hill of No Return
1995	紅柿子	Red Persimmon
2002	自由門神	A Way We Go
2015	風中家族	Where the Wind Settles

Documentary
Year	Chinese title	English title
2007	童心寶貝	Tongxin Baobei

Animated feature film
Year	Chinese title	English title
2005	紅孩兒：決戰火燄山	The Fire Ball

Screen play
Year	Chinese title	English title
1995	紅柿子	Red Persimmon

Art director
Year	Chinese title	English title	Notes
1976	楓葉情	Forever My Love	
1976	追球追求	The Chasing Game	
1976	翠湖寒	The Spring Lake	
1977	煙水寒	The Glory of The Sunset	
1977	微笑	The Smiling Face	Corporate with Chi-Ping Chang
1977	愛的賊船	A Pirate of Love	
1978	煙波江上	Love On A Foggy River	
1978	男孩與女孩的戰爭	The War of the Sexes	
1979	昨日雨瀟瀟	The Misty Rain of Yesterday's	
1979	師妹出關	The Woman Avenger	
1979	結婚三級跳	Jiehun Sanjitiao	
1979	悲之秋	A Sorrowful Wedding	
1979	衝刺	Chongci	
1979	醉拳女刁手	No One Can Touch Her	
1979	忘憂草	A Girl Without Sorrow	
1980	一根火柴	Yigen Huochai	
1980	一對傻鳥	Poor Chasers	
1980	十九新娘七歲郎	Shijiu Xinniang Qisuilang	
1980	雁兒歸	Flying Home	
1980	我踏浪而來	Lover On The Wave	
1980	愛情躲避球	Twin Troubles	
1981	怒犯天條	Offend the Law of God	
1981	假如我是真的	If I Were for Real	
1981	窗口的月亮不准看	Don't Look at The Moon Through The Window	
1983	看海的日子	A Flower in The Raining Night	
1983	天下第一	All The King's Men	
1984	策馬入林	Run Away	Corporate with Chin-Tien Ku and Shung-Man Lam
1989	香蕉天堂	Banana Paradise	Corporate with Chin-Tien Ku and Bo-Lam Lee
1991	密宗威龍	The Tantana	
1993	異域2孤軍	End of The Road	

Producer
Year	Chinese title	English title
1995	熱帶魚	Tropical Fish
2002	藍色大門	Blue Gate Crossing

== Awards and honors ==
Year	Name	Award	Category	Outcome	Ref(s)
1976	Forever My Love	13th Golden Horse Awards	Best Art Direction	Won	
1978	The Glory of the Sunset	15th Golden Horse Awards	Best Art Direction	Nominated	
1981	If I Were for Real	18th Golden Horse Awards	Best Art Direction	Nominated	
1983	All the King's Men	20th Golden Horse Awards	Best Makeup & Costume Design	Won	
1983	All the King's Men	20th Golden Horse Awards	Best Art Direction	Nominated	
1985	Run Away	22nd Golden Horse Awards	Best Makeup & Costume Design	Won	
1985	Run Away	22nd Golden Horse Awards	Best Art Direction	Won	
1987	Strawman	24th Golden Horse Awards	Best Director	Won	
1989	Banana Paradise	26th Golden Horse Awards	Best Makeup & Costume Design	Nominated	
1992	Hill of No Return	29th Golden Horse Awards	Best Director	Won	
1996	Red Persimmon	33rd Golden Horse Awards	Best Director	Nominated	
2007		11th National Award for Arts		Won	
2019		56th Golden Horse Awards	Lifetime Achievement Award	Won	
2023		9th Art Education Contribution Award		Won	
