= Rouge (film) =

1987 Hong Kong film by Stanley Kwan

- Film poster
- Chinese: 胭脂扣
- Hanyu Pinyin: Yānzhī kòu
- Yale Romanization: Yìnjì kau
- Jyutping: Jin1zi1 kau3
- Directed by: Stanley Kwan
- Screenplay by: Chiu Kang-chien; Lilian Lee
- Based on: Rouge by Lilian Lee
- Produced by: Jackie Chan
- Starring: Anita Mui; Leslie Cheung; Alex Man; Emily Chu
- Cinematography: Bill Wong
- Edited by: Peter Cheung
- Music by: Michael Lai
- Production companies: Paragon Films; Golden Way Films
- Distributed by: Golden Harvest
- Release dates: 5 December 1987 (Taiwan); 7 January 1988 (Hong Kong)
- Running time: 96 minutes; 93 minutes (American release)
- Language: Cantonese
- Budget: HK$5.5 million
- Box office: HK$17.4 million

Rouge (Chinese: 胭脂扣; Jyutping: Jin1 zi1 kau3) is a 1987 Hong Kong supernatural romantic-drama film directed by Stanley Kwan, based on novel with the same title by Lilian Lee, who also co-wrote the screenplay. The film stars Anita Mui, Leslie Cheung, Alex Man, and Emily Chu.

== Plot ==
In 1987 Hong Kong, newspaperman Yuen is approached by a glamorous woman, Fleur, who asks to place a missing person advertisement for her lost lover Chan Chen-Pang. Disturbed by her odd behaviour and dated look, Yuen eventually learns that she is a ghost who died some fifty years ago.

In 1934, Chan, the playboy son of a wealthy Nam Pak Hong merchant, met and fell in love with Fleur, a popular courtesan at a teahouse in Shek Tong Tsui. The significant difference in their social statuses, coupled with the fact that Chan was already betrothed to his cousin, meant their romance was doomed from the start. Despite Fleur's support, Chan was unsuccessful in his pursuit to become a Cantonese opera actor. The desperate couple ultimately committed suicide by opium overdose in order to reunite in the afterlife.

Fleur explains that after waiting in the afterlife for half a century, she has returned to look for Chan, whom she believes has become lost. Sympathetic to her plight, Yuen and his girlfriend Chor decide to run the advertisement at their own cost, hoping to reunite the couple by 8 March, the anniversary of their deaths. However, no one shows up at the designated meeting place on that date. Yuen and Chor eventually stumble upon an old newspaper at an antique shop that reveals the truth: Chan had in fact survived the double suicide. Fleur confesses that she secretly drugged Chan, intending to take him with her whether he was prepared or not.

Yuen and Chor's continued search reveals that Chan later married his cousin and inherited the family business. After frittering away his inheritance, he now lives impoverished as a movie extra. They take an increasingly weakened Fleur to a film studio, where they finally track down an elderly, guilt-wracked Chan. Unable to forgive him, Fleur returns the rouge case he had given her fifty-three years ago and departs for the afterlife alone.

== Cast ==
- Anita Mui as Fleur
- Leslie Cheung as Chan Chen-pang
- Alex Man as Yuen
- Irene Wan as Shu-Hsien
- Emily Chu as Ah Chor
- Kara Hui as Ghost
- Lau Kar-wing as Movie Director
- Patrick Tse as Brothel Patron
- Ruby Wong
- Jackie Chan Stunt Team – extra/stunts

== Release ==
The film was made on a low budget but when the producers wanted to add special effects costing another HK$4 million, Kwan objected so they released it at the Taiwan Film Festival where it won three awards at the 24th Golden Horse Awards with Anita Mui winning the Golden Horse Award for Best Leading Actress and the film also winning for photography and art direction.

The film received a Region 1 Criterion Collection home video release in 2022.

== Awards ==
Year	Award	Category	Recipient	Result	Notes
1988	Torino International of Young Cinema	International Feature Film Competition		Special Mention	
1988	Nantes Three Continents Festival	Grand Prix		Won	
1988	24th Golden Horse Awards	Best Leading Actress	Anita Mui	Won	
1988	24th Golden Horse Awards	Best Cinematography	Bill Wong	Won	
1988	24th Golden Horse Awards	Best Art Direction		Won	
1988	Asia-Pacific Film Festival	Best Actress	Anita Mui		
1989	8th Hong Kong Film Awards	Best Film	Golden Way Films Ltd./Golden Harvest Films	Won	
1989	8th Hong Kong Film Awards	Director	Stanley Kwan	Won	
1989	8th Hong Kong Film Awards	Best Actress	Anita Mui	Won	
1989	8th Hong Kong Film Awards	Best Film Editing	Peter Cheung	Won	
1989	8th Hong Kong Film Awards	Best Original Film Score	Lai Siu-Tin	Won	
1989	8th Hong Kong Film Awards	Best Original Film Song	"Yin Ji Kau"	Won	
