= The Private Life of Chairman Mao =

Book by Li Zhisui

The Private Life of Chairman Mao: The Memoirs of Mao's Personal Physician
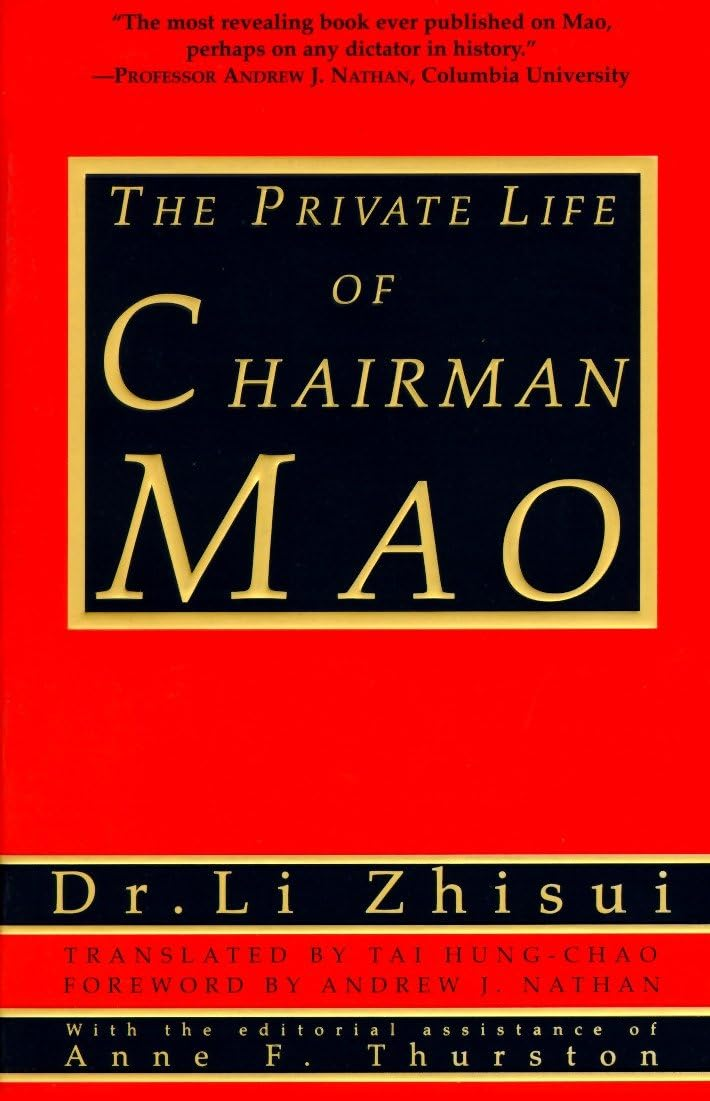
- Author: Li Zhisui
- Language: English
- Subject: Mao Zedong
- Genre: Memoir
- Publisher: Chatto & Windus
- Publication date: 1994
- Publication place: United States
- Pages: 682
- ISBN: 0-7011-4018-6
- OCLC: 774414272

The Private Life of Chairman Mao: The Memoirs of Mao's Personal Physician is a memoir by Li Zhisui, one of the physicians to Mao Zedong, former Chairman of the Chinese Communist Party, which was first published in 1994. Li had emigrated to the United States in the years after Mao's death. The book describes the time during which Li was Mao's physician, beginning with his return to China after training in Australia, through the height of Mao's power to his death in 1976 including the diverse details of Mao's personality, sexual proclivities, party politics and personal habits.

The book was controversial and ultimately banned in the People's Republic of China. The archive about Mao is strictly confidential and controlled by the General Office of the Chinese Communist Party.

== Background and publication ==
Li Zhisui was Mao Zedong's personal physician for twenty-two years, and Li claimed that during this time he became a close confidant of the Chinese leader. After emigrating to the United States, Li wrote The Private Life of Chairman Mao based on his memories of his time with Mao. The biography was based on his recollection of journals he had kept, which he had burned during the Cultural Revolution.

The original manuscript was written by Li, translated from his native Chinese into English by Professor Tai Hung-chao, then edited by Anne F. Thurston. The foreword to the book was written by Professor Andrew J. Nathan of Columbia University, and the book was published by Random House in 1994. Along with the Random House publication, a Chinese language edition was released by the Chinese Times Publishing Company of Tapei. The book was banned by the government in the People's Republic of China, as have many works criticizing Mao on a personal level, and they subsequently also publicly denounced both the book and a BBC documentary that used it as a basis.

After publication, several people criticized the publication process. Tai claimed that the English-language publisher, Random House, wanted more sensationalist elements to the book than Li had provided, in particular requesting more information about Mao's sexual relationships. Despite Li's own protestations, they overruled him, and put such claims in the published text. Li claimed that Thurston cut substantial parts of his original manuscript without his knowledge. Alterations to the Chinese version of the book included the removal of controversial statements about the Chinese leader Deng Xiaoping, who was still alive and in power of the People's Republic at the time of publication.

Li believed that the Chinese language edition of the book was not directly based upon his original Chinese manuscript, but that it was instead a translation based upon the English version.

== Synopsis ==
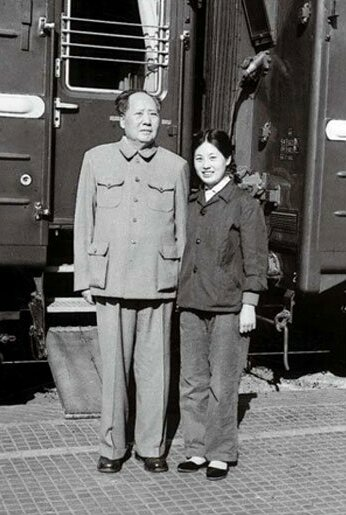
Mao Zedong and Zhang Yufeng in 1964

The book discusses the 22 years for which Li maintains he was Mao's personal physician. After a brief summary of his family and personal history, Li discusses how he came to treat first the senior Chinese communist officials, then in 1954 Mao himself until Mao's death in 1976. Much of the text discusses the difficulties and frustrations faced by Li attempting to deal with the politics, infighting and personal conflicts of the upper echelons of the Chinese Communist Party, as well as the difficulties dealing with both Mao as a patient and other high-ranking officials, such as Mao's wife, the hypochondriac Jiang Qing, Mao's complaining daughter Li Na, and Lin Biao, who the book says was mentally unstable.

The book also discusses the political climate and events of China in the same period. These include Mao's role in orchestrating events such as the Great Leap Forward, the Cultural Revolution, and various purges of members of the Communist Party. A significant portion of the narrative involves treatment of Mao's physical and mental health complaints and Li's personal assessments of how Mao handled the personalities and disputes of the party members that surrounded him. Li also details his disgust and frustrations towards the sycophancy and opportunism of high-ranking officials, such as Zhou Enlai, Deng Yingchao, Yang Shangkun, Lin Biao, Chen Boda, and Zhang Yufeng in carrying out Mao and Jiang Qing's orders against their better judgement, and the effect their actions had on Li's ability to provide medical treatment for Mao. He does however have praise for Wang Dongxing, Luo Ruiqing, Hua Guofeng, Marshals Ye Jianying and Peng Dehuai as the few honest individuals within the system who were willing to challenge Mao, albeit with varying degrees of success.

A significant theme in the book is Li's gradual transition from his initial sincere admiration for Mao as a leader of the country to his eventual disgust, contempt, and personal dislike of the leader due to Mao's manipulation of people and events, odd sexual habits, abuses of power, substitution of slogans, and cult of personality for knowledge of modern science or administrative ability, and above all Mao's indifference to the suffering of the general population due to his failed policies. Throughout the book, Li compares Mao to the historical Chinese Emperors in the tactics he used to control people around him, noting Mao's frequent references to and reading of the histories of Imperial China.

== Reception ==
=== Media reaction ===
The book was reviewed by The New York Times, which described it as "an extraordinarily intimate portrait" containing many details about Mao's time of rule and associations with other major figures in the government, but one that presented few new revelations about the political or diplomatic history of Maoist China. The review stated that though there may never be absolute corroboration of the book and its many anecdotes, its contents are supported by the numerous pictures of Li with Mao on his many trips, as well as the consistency of the details with the information known by specialists of Chinese history and politics. The book also highlighted the hypocritical, often decadent lifestyle Mao experienced, while enforcing strict political and secular restrictions, as well as harmful ideological changes on the population.

The book was also reviewed by the Council on Foreign Relations magazine Foreign Affairs. Criticized for being based on Li's memory and a recreation of his journals in 1977 (the originals were destroyed during the Cultural Revolution out of fear for their possible impact on Li or his family), the review stated that despite this weakness there is "no obvious reason to doubt that Dr. Li is genuine and that his book represents a reasonable effort to record his experiences" and its credibility was enhanced for being edited and reviewed by scholars of Chinese history. The book was praised for probably being the best, or only source for information about larger Chinese political events, disputes within the Chinese high command, and Mao's private life and character. The review highlighted criticisms of Mao's indifference and lack of awareness of the general suffering within the general population of the country, his sexual excesses and intolerance to criticism or challenge, while cautioning against using the personal details of the book to draw general lessons on the nation and revolution.

Writing for The Christian Science Monitor, reviewer Ann Tyson described Li's role as trapped dealing with a man he learned to despise, sacrificing his family life, professional goals, and personal convictions. Tyson also pointed out the threats made by Chinese authorities to confiscate his house upon learning he was writing a memoir, following through with their threat in 1992.

Reviewing the book for the Daily News of Bowling Green, Kentucky, historian Robert Antony described it as an "intimate, candid account of one of the most powerful men in the modern world" and "a haunting tale of intrigue and debauchery in the court of Mao Zedong, as could only be told by a member of the inner circle" and described Li's journey from an idealized patriot who idolized Mao, to a critic disillusioned by Mao's hypocrisy and philandering.

In 2009 Wasafiri magazine included The Private Life of Chairman Mao on its list of 25 Most Influential Books published in the previous quarter-century.

=== Academic reactions ===
==== Positive ====
According to Lorenz M. Lüthi, The Private Life of Chairman Mao "turned out to be a relatively reliable source" that he could verify through comparisons with other documents. Historian Frank Dikötter, wrote in his book, Mao's Great Famine, that Li is "a very reliable guide whose recollections can be verified, sometimes almost verbatim, in the party archives", although he notes that he has also been much maligned by some sinologists.

==== Negative ====
Several people have questioned the authenticity of the book. Li's memoirs were not based on original records or personal diaries. During the Cultural Revolution, he burnt all of his original diaries and, as such, the book was based on restructured memories which might be wrong or fallible as Li's collaborator, Anne Thurston, admitted. Historian Frederick Teiwes accused Li of being "anti-Mao". According to Tai Hung-chao, who was the translator of the book, Random House, the company which published the book, wanted to add more "juicy bits" to the book such as Mao's sex life in order to attract a larger readership. Li disagreed with this line of approach, but eventually gave in to it. A statement protesting that many of the claims made in Li's book were false was issued soon after its publication, signed by 150 people who had personally known or worked with Mao, including Wang Dongxing, Li Yinqiao and Ye Zilong.

==== Inconsistencies between Chinese and English versions ====
Li, in one of his letters which appeared posthumously (1996), admitted that the Chinese edition of the book was not his original Chinese version but a translation from English and that substantial parts of the original Chinese manuscript were cut by the editor, Anne Thurston. Historian Mobo Gao wonders to what extent the English version of the book was written by Li himself. In the Chinese version, claims such as that the memoirs were based on Li's diaries, that Li was the best doctor in China, and that Li could recall Mao's words verbatim are absent. Absent in the Chinese version are also claims about Mao's womanizing behaviour spreading venereal disease, statements like "I [Mao] wash myself inside the bodies of my women" or Mao was "devoid of human feelings", as well as some of Thurston's notes. Gao notes that such omissions are an indication that these outrageous claims would've been appealing to Western readers, however they couldn't be included in the Chinese version because they would've been seen as obviously false to Chinese insiders. Other outrageous claims, such as "Deng Xiaoping made a nurse pregnant and the nurse was forced to have an abortion", were omitted for political reasons and also because the publisher assumed that the Chinese readers couldn't be fooled so easily with such an unsubstantiated claim.

==== Lin, Xu and Wu rebuttal ====
In 1995, a Chinese language book was published in Hong Kong, entitled Lishi de Zhenshi: Mao Zedong Shenbian Gongzuo Renyuan de Zhengyan (meaning The Truth of History: Testimony of the personnel who had worked with Mao Zedong). It was written by three people who had known Mao personally: his personal secretary Lin Ke, his personal doctor from 1953 to 1957, Xu Tao and his chief nurse from 1953 to 1974, Wu Xujun. They argued that Li did not only not know Mao very well, but that he presented an inaccurate picture of him in his book. The trio disproved Li's claim that he had been Mao's personal physician in 1954, by presenting copies of a document from Mao's medical record showing that Li only took on the responsibility for caring for Mao on 3 June 1957. Wu goes on to argue that whilst much of Li's memoir is devoted to talking about Mao in the period between 1954 and 1957, Li was not his general practitioner during this period, and therefore would not have had access to the personal information that he claimed. Lin, Xu and Wu also criticise a number of Li's other claims as being impossible. For instance, whilst Li claimed that he was present at exclusive meetings for high-ranking Communist Party members such as the CCP Politburo Standing Committee meetings, Lin et al. argued that it would have been an extreme breach of protocol for him to be allowed into these events, though it is difficult to conclude that this would have been impossible. In one particular case, Li claimed to have witnessed a public argument between Mao and Deng Xiaoping at the 8th National Congress of the Chinese Communist Party in September 1956, with the latter criticizing the use of personality cult centered around Mao in China, which Li alleged Mao favored. Lin et al. argue, however, that Mao himself had publicly criticized the personality cult in April 1956, when he stated that it was a lesson to be learned from the regime of Joseph Stalin in the Soviet Union. Lin et al. therefore believe that the debate between Mao and Deng that Li was referring to simply never happened, though not everyone would draw the same conclusion.

They also criticise some of Li's claims regarding Mao's personal life, for instance challenging his assertion that Mao was sterile, in which they are supported by Professor Wu Jieping, who was another of Mao's medical care-givers. They theorise that Li had fabricated this story in order to explain why Mao did not have many illegitimate children with the many women that Li controversially claimed he had sexual intercourse with.

==== Other critics ====
Another Chinese critic of Li's work was Qi Benyu, who was formerly a member of the Cultural Revolution radicals in Beijing. Qi had been arrested and imprisoned at Mao's order in 1968, subsequently spending the next eighteen years in prison. Despite his persecution at the hand of Mao however, Qi criticised Li's portrayal of the Chinese leader, claiming that "aside from his account of the support-the-left activities (zhi zuo) in which he [Li] personally participated, most of the Cultural Revolution part of his memoirs consists of stuff gleaned from newspapers, journals and other people's writings. To make Western readers believe that he had access to core secrets, Li fabricated scenarios, resulting in countless errors in his memoirs." Having lived in proximity to Mao for a number of years, Qi remarked that during this time he heard no rumour of Mao ever having extra-marital affairs despite the fact that other senior Party members were known to, and that Mao was always respectful towards "female comrades". Due to this and other reasons, Qi believed Li's claim that Mao had affairs was a lie.

Frederick Teiwes, an American academic specializing in the study of Maoist China, was also critical of The Private Life of Chairman Mao, arguing in his book The Tragedy of Lin Biao: Riding the Tiger during the Cultural Revolution 1966-1971 (1996) that despite Li's extensive claims regarding the politics behind the Cultural Revolution, he was actually "on the fringe" of the events taking place in the Chinese government. He went on to criticise the book as being overtly and polemically "anti-Mao", being "uncritical" in its outlook and being "dependent on the official sources" to create a picture of the revolution. He characterised Li's book as offering nothing new but "recycling widely available information and interpretations".

The Private Life of Chairman Mao was presented as revealing new information about Mao, but historian Mobo Gao has argued, "For those who are familiar with the literature in Chinese, there was in fact very little that was really new in the book when it hit the Western market. For the significant figures and events described in Li's book, memoirs and biographies published previously in China and Hong Kong have revealed as much, if not more."

== See also ==
- Mao's China and After
- History of the People's Republic of China
- Socialism with Chinese characteristics
- Deng Xiaoping and the Transformation of China
