= 24th Golden Horse Awards =

Award ceremony for Chinese-language films of 1986 and 1987

- Date: October 29, 1987
- Site: Taipei Municipal Social Education Hall, Taipei, Taiwan
- Hosted by: Chang Hsiao-yen and David Tao
- Organized by: Taipei Golden Horse Film Festival Executive Committee

Highlights
- Best Feature Film: Strawman
- Best Director: Wang Toon; Strawman
- Best Actor: Chow Yun-fat; An Autumn's Tale
- Best Actress: Anita Mui; Rouge
- Most awards: A Chinese Ghost Story (4)
- Most nominations: A Chinese Ghost Story (8); Strawman (8)

Television in Taiwan
- Channel: CTS

The 24th Golden Horse Awards (Mandarin:第24屆金馬獎) took place on October 29, 1987 at the Taipei Municipal Social Education Hall in Taipei, Taiwan.

== Winners and nominees ==
Winners are listed first and highlighted in boldface.

**Best Feature Film**: **Strawman**; A Chinese Ghost Story; An Autumn's Tale; Rouge; Osmanthus Alley; Project A Part II	**Best Documentary Film**: **惜墨**; 超高壓輸電線工程
**Best Animation** -	**Best Director**: **Wang Toon — Strawman**; Jackie Chan — Project A Part II; Mabel Cheung — An Autumn's Tale
**Best Leading Actor**: **Chow Yun-fat — An Autumn's Tale**; Max Mok — Lai Shi, China's Last Eunuch; Alex Man — Brotherhood	**Best Leading Actress**: **Anita Mui — Rouge**; Cherie Chung — An Autumn's Tale; Hsiao Hung-mei — Edelweiss
**Best Supporting Actor**: **Wu Ma — A Chinese Ghost Story**; Shin Ying — Flowers of Paradise; Wu Pin-nan — Strawman	**Best Supporting Actress**: **Lin Shan-yu — Be My Lovely Child Again**; Lin Hsiu-ling — Osmanthus Alley; Wern Ying — Strawman
**Best Cinematography**: **Bill Wong — Rouge**	**Best Art Direction**: **Rouge**
**Special Award**: **The Story of Dr. Sun Yat-sen**; **Jackie Chan**; **Tung Yueh-chuan**
