= Sha Yexin =

Chinese playwright and short story writer (1939–2018)

- 沙叶新
- Born: 13 July 1939; Nanjing, China
- Died: 26 July 2018 (aged 79)
- Occupations: Playwright, writer

Sha Yexin or Sha Yeh-hsin (Chinese: 沙叶新; 13 July 1939 – 26 July 2018) was a Hui-Chinese playwright and short story writer. He is one of the top Chinese playwright of his time, best known for his outspoken stance towards political issues.

Sha's career was marked by both official recognition and controversy. Some of his works were praised and staged by state institutions, while others were criticized, restricted, or banned for their political implications. His 1979 play, If I Were for Real, drew particular attention for its public critique of bureaucratic privilege and corruption that emerged in Chinese society after the Cultural Revolution.

Beyond his literary work, Sha openly supported social and political movements. He marched with protesters during the 1989 demonstrations prior to the June Fourth Incident and was later one of the 303 original signatories of Charter 08, a manifesto calling for political reform and democracy in China. Although Sha held many official titles over the years, Sha consistently described himself as "just a playwright" and remained an influential writer.

== Biography ==
Sha was born in 1939 into a Hui family in Nanjing, China. After he graduated from the East China Normal University, he published his first one-act play, One Cent, in 1965. In 1961, he was recommended for admission to the Shanghai Theatre Academy. He joined the China Writers Association in 1985. From 1985 onward, he served as director of the Shanghai People's Art Theatre, and in 1993 he voluntarily stepped down to break the lifetime tenure system.

Later works include his plays Diligent Study, Jesus, Confucius and John Lennon, Secret History of Marx, Looking For a Man and his short story titled Untitled dialogue. Another play If I Were for Real was written by him together with fellow playwrights Li Shoucheng and Yao Mingde and later made into a movie directed by Wang Tong.

In 1985, Sha became the head of the Shanghai People's Art Theatre, In 2002, he delivered a speech at the centennial of the founding of East China Normal University.

In 2007, Sha met with German chancellor Angela Merkel regarding freedom of the press in China.

== Works ==
=== Plays ===
- One Cent (一分钱; 1965)
- Diligent Study (好好学习)
- If I Were for Real (假如我是真的; co-written in 1979)
- Mayor Chen Yi (陈毅市长; 1980)
- Jesus, Confucius and John Lennon (耶稣·孔子·披头士列侬; 1987)
- Secret History of Marx (马克思秘史)
- Looking For a Man (寻找男子汉)
- Jiang Qing and Her Husbands (江青和她的丈夫们; 1990)
- What a Blissful Encounter, Mr. Ts'ai! (幸遇先生蔡; 2001)
- The Conscience of Hu Yaobang (良心胡耀邦; 2015)

=== Short stories ===
- Untitled dialogue (无标题对话)

== Adoptations of his works ==
- If I Were for Real is a 1981 Taiwanese film adapted by Chang Yung-hsiang. It won Best Film, Best Adapted Screenplay and Best Actor at the 18th Golden Horse Awards.
