= Zhang Yufeng (disambiguation) =

Zhang Yufeng (born 1945) is a former personal secretary and mistress of Mao Zedong

Zhang Yufeng may also refer to:

- Zhang Yufeng (baseball) (born 1977), Chinese baseball player and manager
- Zhang Yufeng (footballer) (born 1998), Chinese football player
