= Spring Fever =

Spring Fever may refer to:

- Spring fever, an experience of restlessness or romantic feelings, associated with the onset of spring

== Film ==
- Spring Fever (1919 film), an American silent short film directed by Hal Roach
- Spring Fever (1927 film), an American silent film directed by Edward Sedgwick
- Spring Fever (1965 film) (Fiebre de primavera), a 1965 Argentine film directed by Enrique Carreras
- Spring Fever (1981 film), a Taiwanese film directed by Su Yueh-ho
- Spring Fever (1982 film), an American film directed by Joseph L. Scanlan
- Spring Fever (2009 film), a Chinese film directed by Lou Ye
- Cabin Fever 2: Spring Fever, a 2009 American film directed by Ti West

== Literature ==
- Spring Fever (novel), a comic novel by P. G. Wodehouse
- Spring Fever (manga), a Japanese manga anthology by Yugi Yamada

== Music ==
- "Spring Fever" (song), by Loretta Lynn, 1978
- "Spring Fever", a song by Elvis Presley from Girl Happy
- Spring Fever, a 1975 album by Rick Derringer
- Springfever, a 1976 album by Joachim Kühn
- "Spring Fever" (Sub Urban song), by Sub Urban, 2020

== Television ==
- Spring Fever (TV series)
- "Spring Fever" (Bear in the Big Blue House)
- "Spring Fever" (Last of the Summer Wine)
- "Spring Fever!" (The Raccoons)
