= Jiang Qing and Her Husbands =

- Written by: Sha Yexin
- Characters: Jiang Qing; Mao Zedong; Tang Na; He Zizhen; Xiao Feng
- Original language: Chinese
- Genre: history
- Setting: Shanghai, 1935–1937; Yan'an, 1938; Mount Lu, 1959; Beijing, 1966–1980; (Dazhai, Shanxi, 1976)

Jiang Qing and Her Husbands
- Traditional Chinese: 江青和她的丈夫們
- Simplified Chinese: 江青和她的丈夫们
Transcriptions
Standard Mandarin
- Hanyu Pinyin: Jiāng Qīng hé Tā de Zhàngfū mén
Yue: Cantonese
- Jyutping: Gong^{1} Cing^{1} wo^{4} Taa^{1} dik^{1} Zoeng^{6}-fu^{1} mun^{4}

Jiang Qing and Her Husbands is a Chinese historical play written by Sha Yexin in 1990. The play follows Jiang Qing from a young actress in the 1930s to the most powerful Chinese woman in the 1970s, focusing on her relationships with the many men in her life including Mao Zedong. The play draws comparisons between Jiang Qing and one of her best-known acting roles, Nora in Henrik Ibsen's A Doll's House.

Owing to its highly sensitive subject, the play was banned in both mainland China and British Hong Kong. In 2010, the play was adapted by Perry Chiu Experimental Theatre and premiered in Hong Kong's Sheung Wan Civic Centre in Cantonese. Starring Perry Chiu as Jiang Qing and produced by Chiu's husband Clifton Ko, the adaptation was also successfully performed in Canada, but actually differs in content from the original. The adaptation's English title is I Am Chairman Mao's Bitch!, which derives from a famous quote by Jiang Qing during her 1980 trial (and also featured in the play): "I was Chairman Mao's dog. When he told me to bite someone, I did it."

== Characters ==
- Jiang Qing, known as Lan Ping before 1938
- Tang Na, Jiang Qing's second husband
- Mao Zedong, Jiang Qing's final husband
- He Zizhen, Mao Zedong's third wife
- Xiao Feng – Mao Zedong's personal secretary during the 1970s, Zhang Yufeng
- Mao Zedong's bodyguard in Yan'an
- Director Zhang (non-speaking role) – Zhang Min (章珉) whom Lan Ping was rumored to have had a liaison in 1937

== English translation ==
- Sha Yexin (2003). "Jiang Qing and Her Husbands". In Chen, Xiaomei (ed.). Reading the Right Text: An Anthology of Contemporary Chinese Drama. Translated by Kirk A. Denton. University of Hawaiʻi Press. pp. 282–335. ISBN 0-8248-2505-5.
