= Barry Wong =

Hong Kong screenwriter and actor (1946–1991)

- Born: Wong Ping-Yiu; 20 November 1946; Wuzhou, Guangxi, China
- Died: 16 October 1991 (aged 44); Berlin, Germany
- Occupations: Screenwriter, film producer and actor
- Years active: 1980—1991
- Awards: Hong Kong Film Awards – Professionalism Award, The 11th Hong Kong Film Awards

Chinese name
- Traditional Chinese: 黃炳耀
- Simplified Chinese: 黄炳耀
Transcriptions
Standard Mandarin
- Hanyu Pinyin: Huáng Bǐng Yào
Yue: Cantonese
- Jyutping: Wong Ping-Yiu
- Musical career
- Also known as: B.Y. Wong; Berry Wang; Huang Bing Yao; Wong Ping-Yiu
- Origin: Hong Kong
- Genres: Cinema of Hong Kong

Barry Wong (20 November 1946 – 16 October 1991), also known as Wong Ping-Yiu (黃炳耀), was a Hong Kong screenwriter, film producer and actor. He was hailed as one of the most prolific screenwriters of Hong Kong cinema penning scripts for some of the top filmmakers and actors during the 1980s and early 1990s. Wong died from a heart attack on 16 October 1991 while on a trip to Berlin, Germany.

== Career ==
Wong wrote scripts for films ranging from action to comedy. As an actor, Wong was known for his supporting roles, often wearing his horn-rimmed glasses.

During his career, he had collaborated with Tsui Hark, Stephen Chow, Eric Tsang, Sammo Hung, Danny Lee, John Woo, Jackie Chan and Wong Jing. John Woo's cult action film Hard Boiled was dedicated to him after his death.

== Filmography ==
=== Writer ===
- Read Lips (1980)
- The Prodigal Son (1981)
- The Daring Age (1981)
- The Gold-Hunters (1981)
- Carry On Pickpocket (1982)
- Dragon Lord (1982)
- A Fist Full of Talons (1983)
- Winners and Sinners (1983)
- The Dead and the Deadly (1983)
- Double Trouble (1984)
- Silent Romance (1984)
- The Other Side of Gentleman (1984)
- Heart of Dragon (1985)
- Friendly Ghost (1985)
- Funny Triple (1985)
- Yes, Madam (1985)
- Mr. Vampire (1985)
- Twinkle, Twinkle, Lucky Stars (1985)
- The Intellectual Trio (1985)
- Funny Face (1985)
- Affectionately Yours (1985)
- My Lucky Stars (1985)
- Millionaires Express (1986)
- Righting Wrongs (1986)
- Mr. Vampire II (1986)
- Lucky Stars Go Places (1986)
- Rosa (1986)
- Shyly Joker (1986)
- Where's Officer Tuba? (1986)
- Eastern Condors (1987)
- The Haunted Cop Shop II (1988)
- Love Soldier of Fortune (1988)
- 18 Times (1988)
- Mr. Smart (1989)
- Pedicab Driver (1989)
- Vampire Buster (1989)
- Lost Souls (1989)
- City Cops (1989)
- Encounters of the Spooky Kind II (1990)
- Island of Fire (1990)
- She Shoots Straight (1990)
- Pantyhose Hero (1990)
- Outlaw Brothers (1990)
- Family Honor (1990)
- The Fortune Code (1990)
- Whampoa Blues (1990)
- Alan & Eric: Between Hello and Goodbye (1991)
- Scheming Wonders (1991)
- Fight Back to School (1991)
- The Gods Must Be Crazy III (1991)
- Slickers vs Killers (1991)
- The Banquet (1991)
- Lethal Contact (1992)
- Operation Scorpio (1992)
- Twin Dragons (1992)
- Hard Boiled (1992)
- Fun and Fury (1992)
- A Kid from Tibet (1992)
- Ghost Punting (1992)

=== Actor ===
- Winners and Sinners (1983) - Announcer
- The Other Side of Gentleman (1984) - Father Tam
- Chou xiao ya (1985)
- Lucky Stars Go Places (1986) - Police Officer at Meeting #1
- Mang gwai hok tong (1988) - Senior Inspector
- Lie ying ji hua (1988)
- The Killer (1989) - Chief Insp. Dou / Tu
- Vampire Buster (1989) - Pedestrian watching TV
- Lung joi tin ngai (1989) - Drug Dealer
- Family Honor (1990) - Internal Affairs Officer
- Curry and Pepper (1990) - Chow
- Huang jia du chuan (1990) - King of Gambling
- Yeh moh sin sang (1990) - Chef
- Peng dang (1990)
- Island of Fire (1990) - Inspector Wong
- Alan & Eric: Between Hello and Goodbye (1991) - Alan's Boss
- To hok wai lung (1991) - Wong Sir aka Scissor Legs
- Zei sheng (1991)
- God of Gamblers III: Back to Shanghai (1991) - Chief Superintendent of Police, Wong Sir
- The Banquet (1991) - Man at Table
- Tao xue ying xiong zhuan (1992) - Chief Superintendent of Police, Wong Sur
- Te yi gong neng xing qiu ren (1992)
- Ji de... xiang jiao cheng shu shi (1993) - James Wong / The Killer (final film role)
