= The Coldest Winter in Peking =

- Video cover
- Chinese: 皇天后土
- Literal meaning: Emperor Sky, Empress Earth
- Hanyu Pinyin: Huáng Tiān Hòu Tǔ
- Directed by: Pai Ching-jui
- Written by: Teng Yu-kun; Chao Chi-pin
- Produced by: Koo Chen-fu; Lee Shin-feng
- Starring: Charlie Chin; Sibelle Hu; Liu Yen-fang; George Wang; Ko Chun-hsiung
- Cinematography: Lin Tsan-ting
- Edited by: Wang Chin-chen
- Music by: Lo Ming-tao
- Production company: Central Motion Pictures
- Release date: February 5, 1981
- Running time: 123 minutes
- Country: Taiwan
- Language: Mandarin

The Coldest Winter in Peking is a 1981 Taiwanese drama film directed by Pai Ching-jui, set in the Chinese capital Peking (Beijing) during the Cultural Revolution. The film is strongly anti-communist and was banned not only in mainland China but also in British Hong Kong.

== Cast ==
- Charlie Chin
- Sibelle Hu
- Liu Yen-fang
- George Wang
- Ko Chun-hsiung
- Sihung Lung
- Gua Ah-leh
- Chang Feng
- Tsao Chien
- Chin Han
- Tien Feng
- Kwan Shan

== Awards and nominations ==
1981 18th Golden Horse Awards

- Won—Best Supporting Actor (George Wang)
- Nominated—Best Film
- Nominated—Best Actress (Sibelle Hu)
- Nominated—Best Supporting Actor (Liu Yen-fang)
- Nominated—Best Editing (Wang Chin-chen)
