= Taipei City Arts Promotion Office =

Culture center in Songshan, Taipei, Taiwan

Coordinates: 25°02′54″N 121°33′6.8″E

- 臺北市藝文推廣處
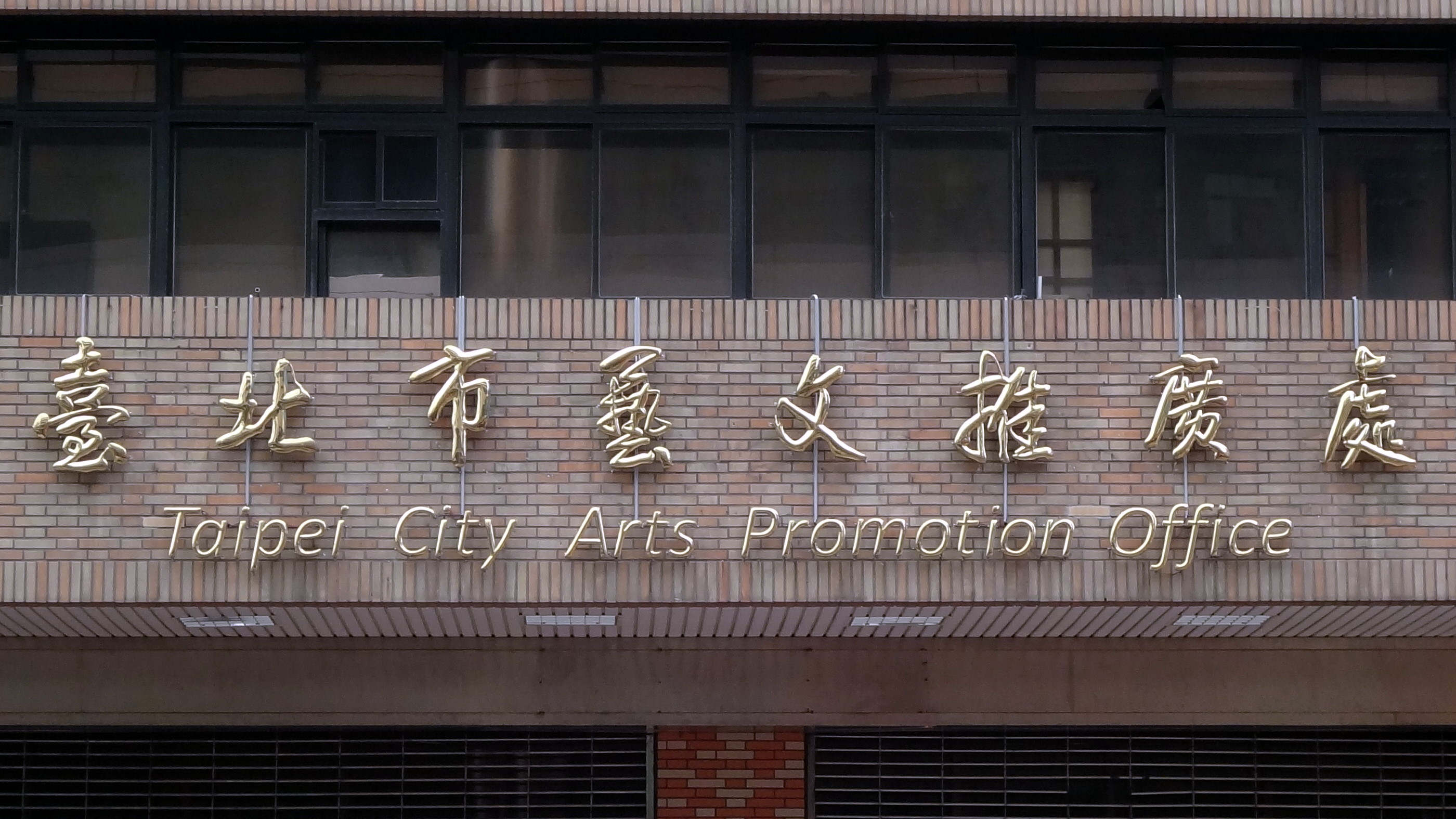

General information
- Type: arts center
- Location: Songshan, Taipei, Taiwan
- Opening: January 1964 (as Taipei Municipal Social Education Hall); November 1999 (as Taipei Cultural Center); November 2015 (as Taipei City Arts Promotion Office)
- Operator: Department of Cultural Affairs, Taipei City Government

Website
- Official website

Taipei City Arts Promotion Office (traditional Chinese: 臺北市藝文推廣處; simplified Chinese: 台北市艺文推广处; pinyin: Táiběi Shì Yìwén Tuīguǎng Chù) is a cultural center in Songshan District, Taipei, Taiwan.

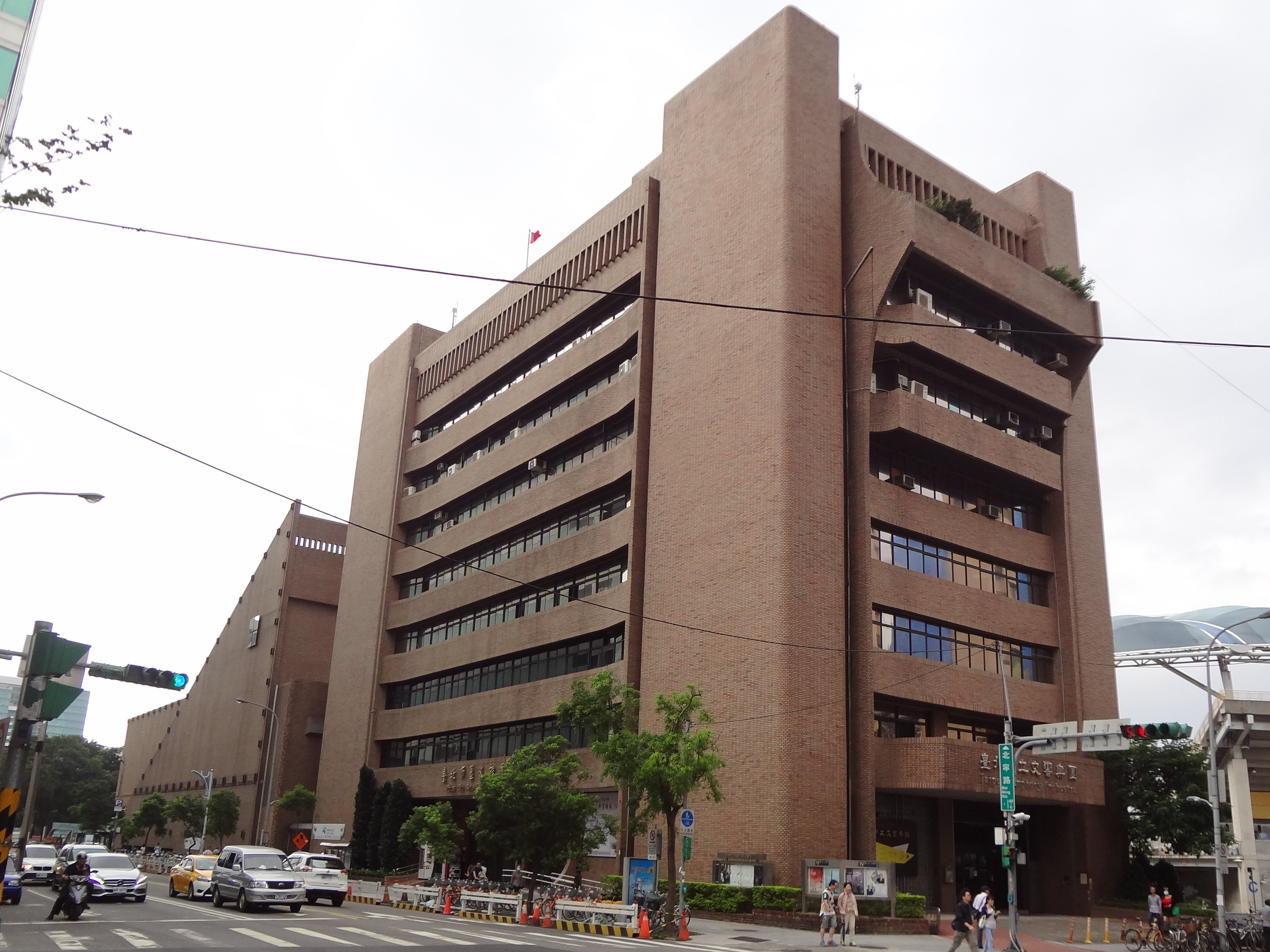
Taipei City Arts Promotion Office

== History ==
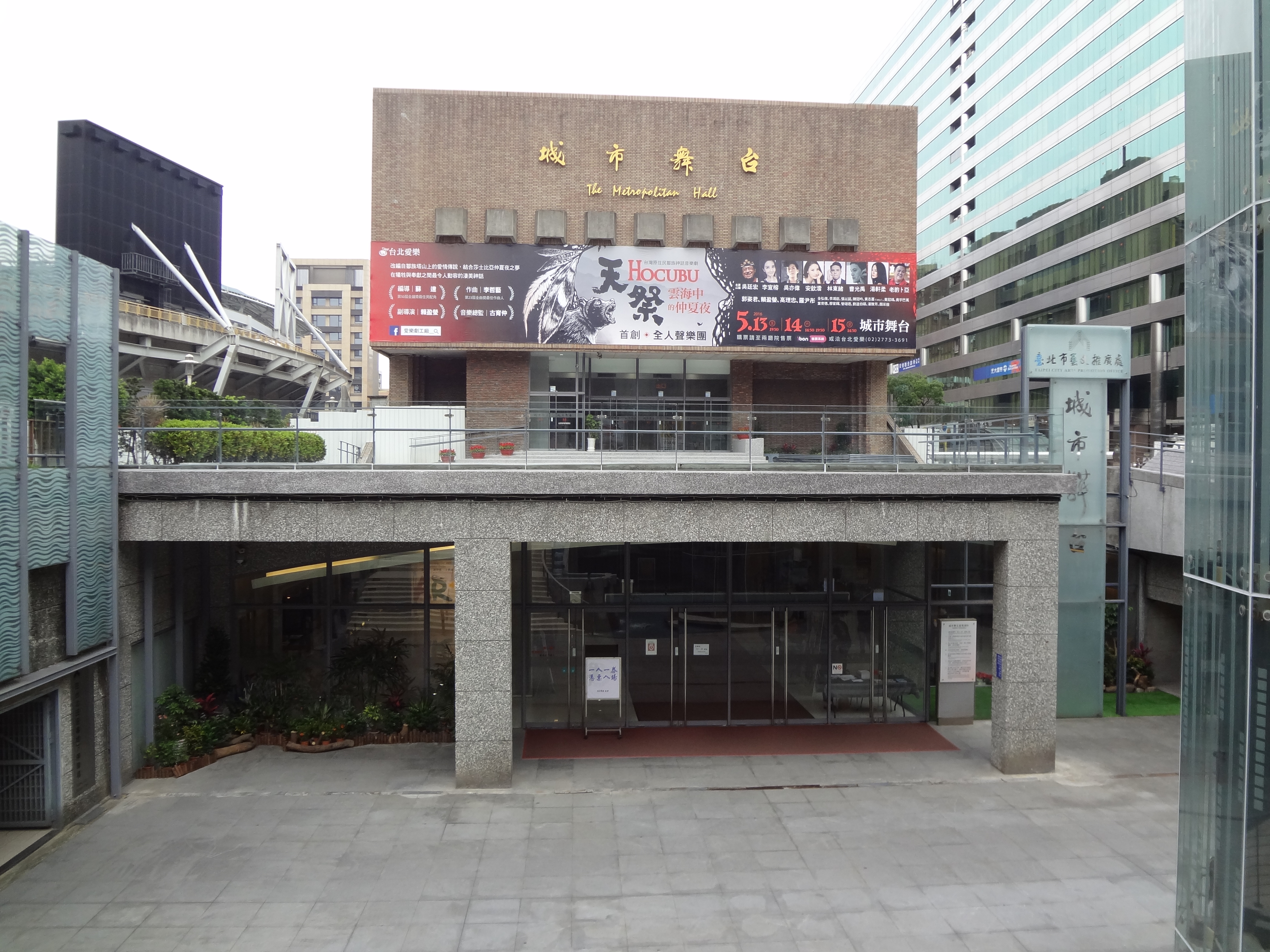
The Metropolitan Hall, Taipei City Arts Promotion Office

The preparation and planning for the founding of the office began in April 1961. In January 1964, the office was opened by the Department of Education of Taipei City Government as the Taipei Municipal Social Education Hall (臺北市立社會教育館) at Chung-Shan Building in Taipei. In January 1967, the center borrowed the Ming-Lun Hall of Taipei Confucius Temple as their temporary location before deciding to construct its own place at the Municipal Park No. 5 in 1976. The construction work started in March 1979 and was completed in June 1983. The center was officially reopened to the public on 22 October in the same year. In November 1999, the center was taken over by the Department of Cultural Affairs of Taipei City Government and its English name was changed to Taipei Cultural Center. In November 2015, the center was renamed to Taipei City Arts Promotion Office.

== Notable events ==
- 22nd Golden Bell Awards
- 23rd Golden Horse Awards
- 24th Golden Horse Awards

== Transportation ==
The cultural center is accessible within walking distance South East from Taipei Arena Station of Taipei Metro.

== See also ==
- List of tourist attractions in Taiwan
