= If I Were for Real (album) =

- Polydor Records cover

Studio album by Teresa Teng
- Released: 2 April 1981
- Genre: Mandopop
- Length: 36:51
- Language: Mandarin
- Label: Polydor Records; Kolin Records

Teresa Teng chronology
Yuan Xiangqing Nong (1980)	If I Were for Real (1981)	Love is Like a Song (1981)

Singles from If I Were for Real
- 1. "If I Were Real" Released: 2 April 1981

Alternate cover
- Kolin Records cover

If I Were for Real (Chinese: 假如我是真的; pinyin: Jiǎrú wǒ shì zhēnde) is a Mandarin studio album recorded by Taiwanese singer Teresa Teng. It was released under Polydor Records Hong Kong as Love Songs of Island, Vol. 7: If I Were for Real on 2 April 1981, as the seventh record of her "Love Songs of the Island" series. The album was re-released in Taiwan through Kolin Records on 1 June 1981.

== Background and release ==
The "island" in the "Love Songs of Island" portion of the album title refers to Japan, as five of the album's tracks consist of covers of Japanese songs. The title track was used as the theme song for the 1981 drama film of the same name, with the character Farm Director Zheng in the film being a big Teresa Teng fan. The film was met with positive reception in Taiwan and won Best Feature Film at the 18th Golden Horse Awards. The song was later covered by many singers including Faye Wong in Decadent Sound of Faye (1995).

In the Polydor edition, sides one and two of the Kolin edition were reversed. An addition track was included, "Qingfeng" (輕風; "Breeze"), written by Chuang Nu and composed by Chen Hsin-yi. "Qingfeng" was featured in the 1981 film Spring Fever. In addition, the title of "Jiaru" was changed to "Jiaru Meng'er Shi Zhende" (假如夢兒是真的; "If Dreams Were for Real").

== Composition ==
Several tracks were Mandarin-language covers of previous released Japanese-language songs by other artists; "Bieli" is a cover of a 1979 song titled "Wakaretemo Sukina Hito" (別れても好きな人) by Los Indios & Silvia's. "Meng" is a cover of a 1971 song titled "Kono Sora no Aosa wa" (この空の青さは) by Kei Ogura.

"Qing Hu" is a cover of Teng's own song "Taipei no Yoru" (台北の夜), which was originally included on her Japanese album Anata / Magokoro several months prior in September 1980. "Shancha Hua" is a cover of a 1978 song titled "Michi Dure" (みちづれ) by Mieko Makimura, while the final track "Wo Yu Qiufeng" is a cover of a 1976 song titled "Sukima Kaze" (すきま風) by Ryōtarō Sugi.

== Track listing ==
Side A
No.	Title	Lyrics	Music	Length
1.	"Jiaru Wo Shi Zhende" (假如我是真的; "If I Were for Real")	Chuang Nu (莊奴)	Chen Hsin-yi (陳信義)	3:05
2.	"Bieli" (别离; "Departure")	Lin Huang-kuen (林煌坤)	Ben Sasaki (佐々木勉)	3:17
3.	"Yao Qu Yaoyuan de Difang" (要去遙遠的地方; "Going to Distant Places")	Lin Huang-kuen	Wang Luobin	3:42
4.	"Ai Yu" (愛雨; "Love Rain")	Sun Yi (孫儀)	Tony Weng (湯尼)	2:53
5.	"Caixia Huilai Ba" (彩霞回來吧; "Come Back, Sunset Clouds")	Chuang Nu	Andy (安蒂)	3:14
6.	"Meng" (夢; "Dreams")	Chuang Nu	Kei Ogura	3:15
Total length:				19:26

Side B
No.	Title	Lyrics	Music	Length
7.	"Jiaru" (假如; "If")	Chuang Nu	Chen Hsin-yi	2:40
8.	"Qing Hu" (情湖; "Lake of Feeling")	Chuang Nu	Junzou Shigaraki (信楽順三)	3:58
9.	"Ni Wei He Bu Shuo" (你為何不說; "Why Wouldn't You Say")	Sun Yi	Tony Weng	3:21
10.	"Shancha Hua" (山茶花; "Camellia Flower")	Chuang Nu	Minoru Endō (遠藤実)	4:02
11.	"Wo Yu Qiufeng" (我與秋風; "Me and the Autumn Wind")	Lin Huang-kuen	Minoru Endō	3:24
Total length:				17:25

== Credits and personnel ==
- Teresa Teng – vocalist
- Chuang Nu – lyricist
- Sun Yi – lyricist
- Lin Huang-kuen – lyricist
- Chen Hsin-yi – composer
- Minoru Endo – composer
- Ben Sasaki – composer
- Wang Luobin – composer
- Chen Hsin-yi – composer
- Tony Wen – composer
- Kei Ogura – composer
- Junzou Shigaraki – composer

== Certifications ==
Region	Certification	Certified units/sales
Hong Kong (IFPI Hong Kong)	Gold	25,000^{*}
^{*} Sales figures based on certification alone.
