= Strawman (film) =

- Film poster
- Chinese: 稻草人
- Hanyu Pinyin: Dào Cǎo Rén
- Directed by: Wang Toon
- Written by: Wang Shau Di; Sung Hung
- Produced by: Hsu Kuw Liang
- Starring: Chang Po Chou; Wu Pin Nan; Cho Sheng Li; Lin Mei Chao
- Cinematography: Li Zhen Sheng; Ding Fu Yi
- Edited by: Chen Sheng Chang; Chen Li Yu
- Music by: Zhang Hong Yi
- Production company: Central Motion Picture Corporation
- Distributed by: Golden Harvest Film Production Company Limited (Hong Kong)
- Release date: 23 October 1987 (Taiwan)
- Running time: 96 minutes
- Country: Taiwan
- Languages: Taiwanese; Japanese

Strawman is a 1987 Taiwanese film directed by Wang Toon (王童; aka Wang Tong). It is the first feature of Wang's "Taiwan Trilogy,'' which also includes Banana Paradise (香蕉天堂; 1989) and Hill of No Return (無言的山丘; 1992). The film adopts a comic tone to depict the hardships of life as colonizers in rural Taiwan at the height of WWII. The film received positive reviews from critics and won the Best Feature Film, Best Director and Best Original Screenplay in The 24th Golden Horse Awards.

== Plot ==
The story is told from the viewpoint of a scarecrow on the field. The two brothers A Fa and Big Mouth are second-generation tenant farmers living in rural Taiwan under Japanese colonial rule during WWII. They have a poor harvest and sparrows constantly eat their crops. To avoid her two sons being drafted, their mother smears cow dung on their eyes to cause infection.

Their landlord is the husband of A Fa's sister-in-law, Yueh Niang, who comes to live with the family due to the threat of US airstrikes. The family prepares a dinner to welcome the landlord. They plan to have a fish included in the dinner, a delicacy at the time. The children are told that they can have the fish left over from the dinner, but the landlord and his family eat all of it. The landlord tells A Fa and Big Mouth that he had decided to sell the land to the sugar factory. A Fa's family is troubled by confiscation of their cattle by the Japanese military, and are unable to farm the field. After an air raid, an unexploded bomb lands in the field

Believing that they could be handsomely rewarded, the brothers and the local policeman decided to carry the heavy bomb all the way to the police office in the town. A Japanese police officer was terrified by the sight of the bomb and ordered them to immediately leave and throw the bomb to the sea. They follow the order, and the bomb unexpectedly explodes in the sea, collecting fish at the shore. A Fa and Big Mouth return home with fish. The landlord was unable to sell the field.

== Cast ==
Character	Actor
A Fa (陳發)	Chang Po Chou (張柏舟)
Big Mouth (陳闊嘴)	Cho Sheng Li (卓勝利)
Narcissus (陳水仙)	Lin Mei Chao (林美照)
A Fa's Wife	Wern Ying (文英)
Big Mouth's Wife	Yang Kuei Mei (楊貴媚)
Mr. Chang	Ko Chun Hsiung (柯俊雄)
Yueh Niang (月娘)	Jang Chuen Fang (張純芳)
Son of Mr. Chang	Jeff Cheng (鄭同村)
Japanese Cops	Wu Pin Nan (吳炳南)
A Fa and Big Mouth's Mother	Ying Ying (英英)
The Officer	Li Kun/ Kwan Lee (李昆)
Chief of Village	Fong Lung (方龍)

== Production ==
For Wang Toon the silent scarecrows in the movie represent the ordinary Taiwanese, inferior to the Japanese, under Japanese rule.

The disabled Taiwanese officer who served in the Japanese military is not played by an actor but a local villager at Su'ao, Yilan. During the shooting, Wang Toon insisted that the character of the wounded soldier be played by a disabled person. While the production team was having difficulty to find such an actor, they accidentally met the man in a Hotel near Su'ao. He became one of the significant characters in the movie.

Because of the language policy of Taiwan at the time when the film was made, the actors have to speak Mandarin in the whole film, despite the setting of the story being in a Taiwanese village. To be truthful to his own film, Wang Toon secretly produced a version of the film dubbed in Taiwanese, which is also the version that is digitally restored version of the film released in 2023 by the Taiwan Film and Audio-visual Institute.

== Reception & Awards ==
On the review aggregator site Rotten Tomatoes, Strawman has an audience approval rating of 83%, as well as 2 critics' reviews.

Year	Award	Category	Recipient	Result	Ref.
1987	The 24th Golden Horse Award	Best Feature Film	Central Motion Picture Corporation	Won	
1987	The 24th Golden Horse Award	Best Director	Wang Toon	Won	
1987	The 24th Golden Horse Award	Best Original Screenplay	Wang Shau Di, Sung Hung	Won	
1987	The 24th Golden Horse Award	Best Art Direction	KU Chin Tien	Nominated	
1987	The 24th Golden Horse Award	Best Dialogue Recording	Hsin Chiang Sheng, Yang Ching An, Hu Ding Yi	Nominated	
1987	The 24th Golden Horse Award	Best Supporting Actor	Wu Pin Nan	Nominated	
1987	The 24th Golden Horse Award	Best Supporting Actress	Wern Ying	Nominated	
1987	The 24th Golden Horse Award	Best Cinematography	Mark Lee Ping Bing	Nominated	
1988	The 33rd Asia Pacific Film Festival	Best Feature Film	Central Motion Picture Corporation	Won	
1988	The 33rd Asia Pacific Film Festival	Best Supporting Actor	Wu Pin Nan	Won	
