= If I Were for Real (play) =

1979 Chinese play

- Written by: Sha Yexin; Li Shoucheng; Yao Mingde
- Characters: Li Xiaozhang; Zhou Minghua; Theatre Director Zhao; Division Head Qian; Bureau Chief Sun; Sun Juanjuan; Secretary Wu; Farm Director Zheng; Venerable Comrade Zhang
- Original language: Chinese
- Genre: Satire

If I Were for Real, also translated as The Impostor, If I Were Real, and What If I Really Were?, is a 1979 Chinese satirical play in 6 acts (with an additional prologue and epilogue) written by Shanghai-based playwright Sha Yexin and actors Li Shoucheng (李守成) and Yao Mingde (姚明德). The play is inspired by the March 1979 arrest of Zhang Quanlong (张泉龙), a young man who impersonated the son of Li Da, deputy of the People's Liberation Army General Staff Department.

As the play exposed corruption in the establishment and lampooned the impostor's "victims", there was considerable debate among the literary circles on whether it should be performed publicly. In January 1980, the Chinese Communist Party's propaganda chief Hu Yaobang put an end to the debates by openly criticizing the play as failing "to reflect the true spirit and moral perception of Chinese youth during the New Period", effectively banning its public performances.

== Background ==
In 1979, playwright Sha Yexin and actors Li Shoucheng and Yao Mingde (all from Shanghai People's Art Theatre), went to the preliminary hearing of impostor Zhang Quanlong held in Jing'an District, Shanghai. Zhang Quanlong, a secondary school graduate assigned to a rural farm in Chongming Island (off the shore of Shanghai) during the Cultural Revolution (1966–1976), had become the talk of the city after his arrest. Because he had a former classmate working in the Shanghai Municipal Government, he often visited this cadre friend in the hope that the "connection" could get him permanently transferred back to Shanghai. When he was at the cadre's house, he did household chores and answered the phone, and after some time, remembered the names, positions and relationships of many cadres. One time, frustrated that he could not get a ticket to the restricted play Much Ado About Nothing, he decided to impersonate the son of Li Da, deputy of the People's Liberation Army General Staff Department. Immediately doors opened up for him, and "by the Spring Festival of 1979 Zhang had been accepted by the upper crust of Shanghai society and had the run of the city".

After enjoying a privileged life for months, Zhang was finally exposed and detained when his suspicious neighbors, who noticed him riding in a chauffeured limousine at all hours, reported him to the authorities. His stories, genuine or not, dominated local gossip and won him a dimension of folk hero. According to rumors he said "My only crime is that I am not the son of So-and-so." and "What would have happened if I were really So-and-so's son?"

If I Were for Real was written in a little over 2 weeks and rushed into production in August 1979 by the Shanghai People's Art Theatre and briefly toured a few major cities.

== English translations ==
- Sha Yexin; Li Shoucheng; Yao Mingde (1983). "If I Were for Real". In Lee Yee (ed.). The New Realism: Writings from China After the Cultural Revolution. Hippocrene Books. pp. 261–322. ISBN 0-88254-794-1.
- Sha Yexin; Li Shoucheng; Yao Mingde (1983). "What If I Really Were?". Stubborn Weeds: Popular and Controversial Chinese Literature after the Cultural Revolution. Indiana University Press. pp. 198–250. ISBN 0-253-35512-5. (translated by Edward M. Gunn)
- Sha Yexin; Li Shoucheng; Yao Mingde (1983). "The Impostor (If I Were Real)". Renditions. No. 19 & 20. pp. 319–32. (translated by Daniel Kane)

== Plot summary ==
Li Xiaozhang (李小璋), a 26-year-old sent-down youth at a state farm, is frustrated he cannot receive a transfer to the city. His pregnant girlfriend Zhou Minghua (周明华) has already returned to the city, and without securing his transfer her father would not let them marry. He witnesses how tickets to a popular play (Nikolai Gogol's The Government Inspector, about an impostor) are unavailable to commoners but reserved for cadre members and their families, and decides to play a trick on the theatre director. Posing as the son of a high-level cadre, he immediately gains entrance to the play. Soon many cadres, including the theatre director, a Culture Bureau chief and an Organization Department Political Division head, all fawn over him in the belief that he will in return use his connections for their selfish gains. With their assistance, Li Xiaozhang enjoys a privileged life for more than 2 weeks and even succeeds in receiving his transfer, but is in the end exposed and brought to trial. He admits his guilt but reminds the audience that if he were really the son of a high-level cadre, everything would have been completely legal and accepted.

== Adaptations ==
The play was adapted into a 1981 Taiwanese film of the same name directed by Wang Toon, which won 3 awards at the 18th Golden Horse Awards: Best Film, Best Adapted Screenplay (Chang Yung-hsiang) and Best Actor (Alan Tam).

In 1986, Pan Asian Repertory Theatre in New York City staged the play under director Ron Nakahara. Richard Hornby praised the acting and wrote that "the picture one gets of Chinese society in this play is positive."
