= Vampire Buster =

1989 Hong Kong film by Stanley Siu and Norman Law

- Film poster
- Traditional Chinese: 捉鬼大師
- Simplified Chinese: 捉鬼大师
- Hanyu Pinyin: Zhuō Guǐ Dà Shī
- Jyutping: Zeok1 Gwai2 Daai6 Si1
- Directed by: Stanley Siu; Norman Law
- Screenplay by: Yuen Kai-chi; Barry Wong; Wong Jing
- Produced by: Alan Tang
- Starring: Jacky Cheung; Kent Cheng; Stanley Fung; Natalis Chan; Elsie Chan; Anglie Leung
- Cinematography: Tom Lau; Raymond Lam; Peter Ngo
- Edited by: Poon Hung
- Music by: Anders Nelsson; The Melody Bank
- Production companies: In-Gear Film Production; Foo Ong Film
- Distributed by: In-Gear Film Production
- Release date: 8 June 1989
- Running time: 94 minutes
- Country: Hong Kong
- Language: Cantonese
- Box office: HK$6,080,335

Vampire Buster, released in the United Kingdom as Ninja Vampire Busters, is a 1989 Hong Kong action comedy horror film directed by Stanley Siu and Norman Law and starring Jacky Cheung, Kent Cheng, Stanley Fung and Natalis Chan. Despite the title, the film does not feature any vampires but instead deals with a thousand-year old demon ghost.

In the film, a demon spirit is contained within a valuable vase, dating to the Ming dynasty. After the vase is acquired by a wealthy family in Hong Kong, the demon escapes and possesses the body of the family's father. An exorcist follows the vase to Hong Kong, but the escaped demon is prepared to fight him.

== Plot ==
Cheung Sap-yat is an exorcist in Jiangxi, China who possesses a vase from the Ming dynasty which contains a demon spirit who was a renegade disciple of Cheung's ancestor. Cheung's son, Siu-bo, leads a group of Cultural Revolution supporters, to confiscate the vase from him so Cheung tosses the vase into the sea, which floats to Hong Kong and ends up in a charity auction. The vase ends up being auctioned to Councilor Stephen Kei and his son Jacky, who recently dropped out from school abroad, for HK$1.8 million. When Stephen and Jacky bring the vase home, Stephen's religious mother senses something dirty with the vase so Stephen's girlfriend, Mable, suggests him to bring the vase to visit fortune teller Chan Pak-tung, who is actually a fraud and Mable's secret lover who schemes with her to scam money from Stephen. Stephen brings the vase to Chan, who pretends to perform a Taoist ritual. Chan then dumps some cigar ashes into the vase which causes the demon's hand to pop out of it and when Chan tries to see what is wrong the vase, the demon's hand pushes him away and he gives the vase back to Stephen.

Back at the Kei mansion, the vase suddenly starts smoking and the demon comes out of it and knocks Stephen unconscious. At this time, Jacky was playfully scaring his girlfriend, Cat (Elsie Chan), by wearing monster masks in the dark, and Jacky's younger sister Micky and his grandmother join along. The game is then interrupted when Jacky accidentally kicks his grandmother and they encounter the demon, who they believe is Stephen wearing a mask. The demon tries to attack them but is blocked by a shrine that shines on him, so he then possesses Stephen.

Meanwhile, Cheung has illegally entered Hong Kong after finding out the Keis bought the vase. Cheung is able to evade the police with his agility and later uses supernatural abilities to make a traffic cop hallucinate and give him a ride to the Kei mansion. As Cheung arrives the mansion, he realizes the demon had gotten out of the vase and attempts to exorcise the demon but the demon-possessed Stephen drives him away by shooting him with a sniper rifle. Meanwhile, Jacky accidentally runs over Cheung while on a night drive with Cat and brings Cheung to his mansion after the latter refuses to go to the hospital. While Jacky and Cat were bringing the doctor for Cheung, he is once again attacked by the demon-possessed Stephen. Cheung, who left his tools in Jacky's car, is nearly able to subdue the demon by using a bell from Micky's stuffed Garfield cat until Micky interrupts him and takes the cat and bell away from him and Cheung flees right before Jacky and Cat bring the doctor.

The next day, Cheung finds Jacky and Cat in a church to warn them about Stephen being possessed by a demon but they dismiss him. One night, the demon-possessed Stephen meets with a fellow councilor, Lee, who notices Stephen's recent change in behavior and comments that Stephen may be going insane so the demon manipulates Lee to hallucinate his belt turning into snake and causing him to be run over and killed by a car. At night, a thunder causes the demon to temporary reveal his true form which was seen by Mable, who tells Chan while cheating with him in her house but Chan deduces that Stephen has a fetish in scaring her. The demon-possessed Stephen then arrives and Chan goes into hiding and is horrified after seeing the demon killing Mable. The demon-possessed Stephen then finds Chan and chases him outside and attempts to kill him until Cheung comes just in time strike the demon in the chest and stop him. As the demon-possessed Stephen returns home to treat his wound, Micky notices him so the demon leaves Stephen's body and possess Cat. Cheung and Chan then arrives at the Kei mansion and tell about what is happening but is unable to prove so since Stephen is not possessed anymore and were kicked out by the family. Cheung and Chan then realize that the demon had possessed Micky.

The next morning, Cheung and Chan manage to kidnap the demon-possessed Micky, but the demon manages to cause the car they were in to crash and they end up hospitalized. At the hospital, the doctor tells Stephen and Jacky that Micky's brainwave is unusually strong. During the night, the demon-possessed Micky kills the nurse in charge of watching her and two police officers interrogating Cheung before attacking the latter and causing havoc in the hospital. Jacky, Stephen and Cat also arrive in the hospital and see what has happened to Micky. Afterwards, Cheung tells Jacky, Stephen, Cat and Chan the only way to exorcise the demon is to use a spiritual pole which he left in the crashed car and a Taoist mirror inside the vase. Since Cheung is under custody for illegally entering Hong Kong, he also tells them how to summon his spirit when they need help. Jacky and Cat find the pole in the car at the vehicle pound while Stephen and Chan return to the mansion to find the mirror in the vase, but the demon leaves Micky's body and possess Stephen once again and brings the vase to an abandoned part of the mansion where Stephen's deceased father used to live. Jacky, Cat and Chan follow him there and the demon-possessed Stephen attacks them. During the fight, they were able to summon Cheung to possess Cat, but Cheung was unable to unleash his full power in a female's body until he possess Jacky. During the battle, a doctor and nurse discover Cheung's body at hospital dead with no pulse and prepares to dissect it, so Cheung returns to his body to stop this from happening and leave Jacky, Cat and Chan to take on the demon. The trio were able to find the mirror inside the vase and manage to fend the demon off before Cheung arrives back and subdues the demon. Jacky, who is holding the pole, is reluctant to stab the demon since it will also kill his father who is possessed by the demon but eventually does so and the demon is finally exorcised, with Stephen seemingly destroyed as well. However, a tree falls from above where Stephen comes out safe and not possessed anymore. Micky then gives Stephen an expensive vase that was delivered to him yesterday, but he tosses it off after having gone through all the troubles, and Jacky and Cat jump to catch the priceless treasure from shattering.

== Cast ==
- Jacky Cheung as Jacky Kei (祁天佑)
- Kent Cheng as Cheung Sap-yat (張十一)
- Stanley Fung as Stephen Kei (祁大川)
- Natalis Chan as Chan Pak-tung (陳百通)
- Elsie Chan as Cat
- Anglie Leung as Mable
- Che Man-kei as Micky Kei (祁天真)
- Manfred Wong as Cheung Siu-bo (張小寶)
- Austin Wai as Elder disciple of Cheung's ancestor
- Chung Fat as Demon from the vase
- Shum Wai as Horse bookie after Chan
- Law Lan as Councilor Tang (鄧議員)
- Wong Wai as Councilor Lee (李議員)
- Yip Kai as Shui (阿水)
- Benz Kong as Policeman interrogating Cheung
- Leung Sam as Councilor
- Law Shu-kei as Catholic priest
- Tin Kai-man as Pedestrian watching TV
- Barry Wong as Pedestrian watching TV
- Chun Kwai-bo as Revolutionary
- Patrick Ling as Revolutionary
- John Cheung as Doctor
- Leung Hak-shun as Auctioneer
- Ma Shu-san as Auction bidder
- Lee Wah-kon as Auction bidder

== Reception ==
=== Critical reception ===
Hong Kong Film Net gave the film a score of 6/10 stars and describes it as a "semi-coherent ramblings of a borderline lunatic."

=== Box office ===
The film grossed HK$6,080,335 at the Hong Kong box office during its theatrical run from 8 June to 12 September 1989.
