= Department of Cultural Affairs, Taipei City Government =

Taipei city government department

- 臺北市政府文化局
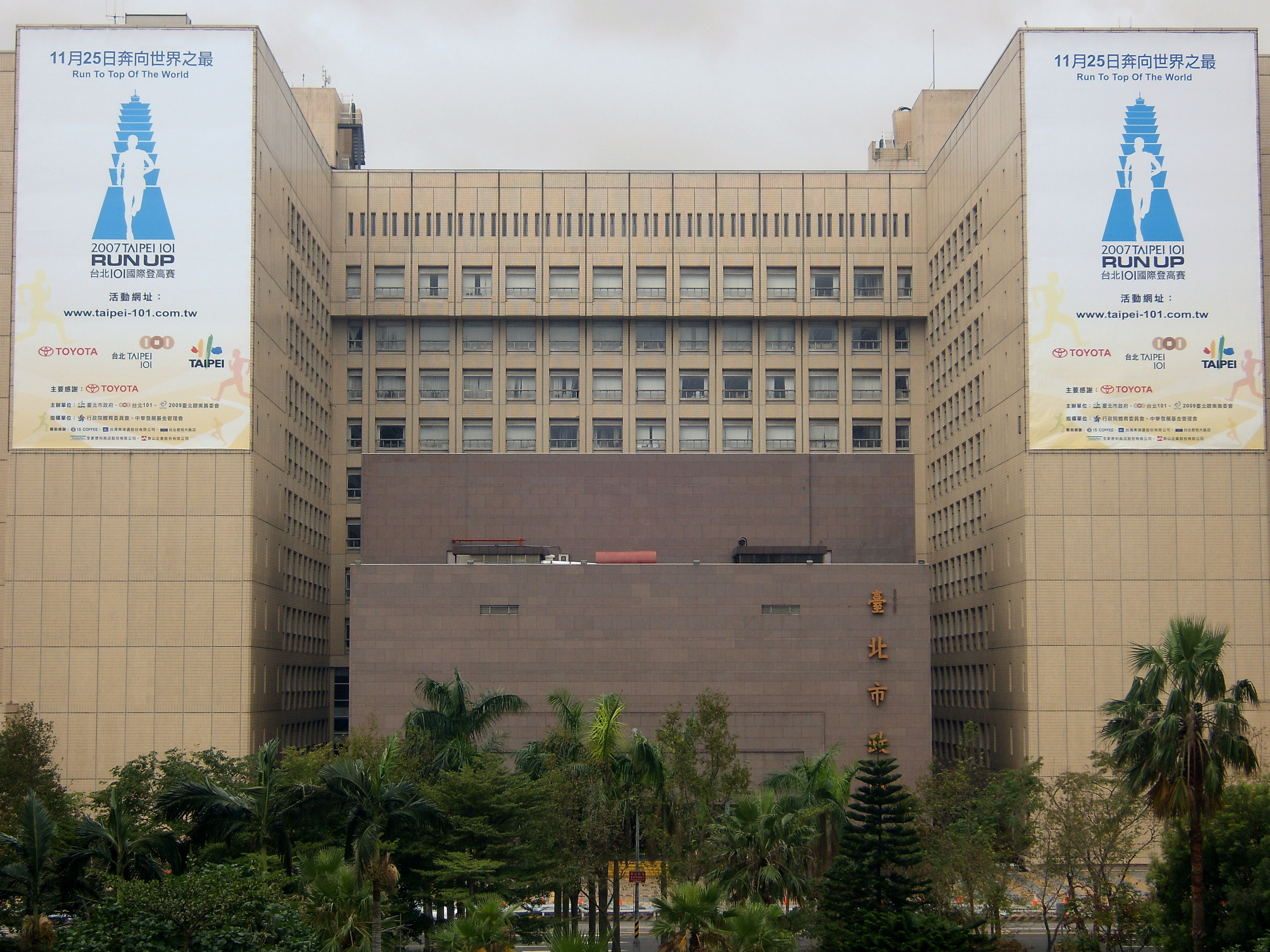

Agency overview
- Headquarters: Xinyi District, Taipei
- Parent agency: Taipei City Government
- Website: www.culture.gov.taipei

The Department of Cultural Affairs, Taipei City Government (DOCA; Chinese: 臺北市政府文化局; pinyin: Táiběi Shì Zhèngfǔ Wénhuà Jú) is a governmental department of Taipei City Government of Taiwan established in November 1999.

== Organisations ==
The department oversees the following organisations:

- Taipei Fine Arts Museum
- Taipei Symphony Orchestra
- Taipei City Archives
- Taipei Chinese Orchestra
- Taipei City Arts Promotion Office
- Taipei Zhongshan Hall
- Taipei Music Center

== See also ==
- Taipei City Government
