= Lin Tsai-pei =

Taiwanese actor and television presenter

- Born: 20 February 1950 (age 76); Taipei, Taiwan
- Education: Chinese Culture University
- Occupations: Actor, TV presenter
- Years active: 1980–present
- Spouse: Tzu Lin
- Children: 1
- Awards: Golden Bell Awards – Best Actor; 1985 Autumn Tide Toward the Evening Sky
- Musical career
- Also known as: Lin Zay-pei; Frank Lin

Lin Tsai-pei (Chinese: 林在培; Pe̍h-ōe-jī: Lîm Chāi-pôe, born 20 February 1950) is a Taiwanese actor and television presenter. He won Best Actor at the 1985 Golden Bell Awards.

== Personal life ==
In 1988, Lin Tsai-pei married singer-actress Chang Kai-ling (張愷凌), better known by her stage name Tzu Lin (紫琳), after 9 years of dating. They starred in the 1988 TV series Walking Through the Past together. After 7 years of marriage they had a daughter, but divorced shortly afterwards, only to remarry 4 years later.

== Filmography ==
=== Films ===
Year	English title	Chinese title	Role	Notes
1980	Part Time Job	暑期工讀生	Ko Pen-yi	
1981	The Merry Couple	歡喜冤家	Mr. Ku	
1981	Lucky By Chance	鬼馬五福星	board director	
1981	Don't Look at the Moon Through the Window	窗口的月亮不准看	Mr. Hu's son	
1981	Spring Fever	吾家有女初長成	Chen Yu-jen	
1981	If I Were for Real	假如我是真的	Yao Qing	
1982	The Woman Who Eats People	磨牙的女人		
1982	The Anger	失節	Ma Ta-yu	
1982	The Sexy Lady Driver	糊塗女司機	Fang Chih-hao	
1982	One Hundred Point	百分滿點		
1982	Exposed to Danger	冷眼殺機	Wu Chen	
1982	Devil Returns	驚魂風雨夜	Doctor Hsu	
1982	Killer Rose	殺人玫瑰	Chen Chieh	
1983	Ah-Yuan My Son	媽媽帶我回家		
1987	Give Her to You	把她交給你	Huang Tsung-heng	TV film
1989	Old Man and Girl	老少五個半		
1991	Bedside Love Stories: Love in a Game	床邊愛情故事:遊戲的愛		TV film
1995	The Long Night	長夜		TV film
1996	Group Meal	圍爐	Liang Tuo	TV film

=== TV dramas ===
Year	English title	Chinese title	Role	Notes
1980	Autumn Water, Vast Sky	秋水長天	Chin	
1981	The Colourful Phoenix Soars	彩鳳飛	Prince Ba	
1982	Corners of the Earth	海角天涯	Han Yun-tien	
1983	Flying Together in Pairs	比翼雙雙飛	Fan Tudan	
1983	Autumn Tide Toward the Evening Sky	秋潮向晚天	Lei Kai-ping	
1984	Heaven Dragon, Sword Hero	天龍劍俠	Nine Yin Child	
1984	The Folk Song Romance	山歌戀	Li Jingtang	
1984	In Search of Love	愛的追尋	Hua Ta-jen	
1984	The Beginning of Life	人之初	Lo Wen-chung	
1985	Flowers Fall Off, but Spring Remains	花落春猶在	Lee Ta-ming	
1985	Endless Love	無盡的愛	Chen Chih-hsiung	
1985	Sun, Moon and Star	星星、月亮、太陽	Xu Jianbai	
1986	The Unofficial Biography of Cixi	慈禧外傳	Yizhu	replaced after 3 episodes
1986	Azure Sea, Blue Sky, Nightly Pines	碧海青天夜夜心	Tang Hui-chun; Tang Hui-yu	
1987	Deep Garden	庭院深深	Chien Fei-fan	
1988	One Side of the Water	在水一方	Lu Yu-wen	
1988	Moment in Peking	京華煙雲	Kung Lifu	
1988	Freezing Point	冰點	Lin Che-an	
1988	Walking Through the Past	走過從前	Chang Yuan	
1989	The Wife-Pursuing Trio	追妻三人行	Niu Chia-hsing	
1990	Three Flowers	三朵花	Meng Yunlou	
1992	No Regrets This Life	今生無悔	Fang Wen-yang	
1993	Justice Pao	包青天	Li Chengnan; Fang Wenshan	unrelated characters
1993	The Temptation of Middle Age	中年的誘惑		
1994	The Seven Heroes and Five Gallants	七俠五義	Lu Fang	
1996	Taiwan Paranormal Events	台灣靈異事件		several unrelated characters
1997	The Strange Cases of Lord Shi	施公奇案		several unrelated characters
1997	Let Me Hear You Say Dad Again	再叫一聲爸爸		
1998	The Loafer-Turned-Imperial Envoy	浪子大欽差	Shi Bupo; Lu Tianhong	unrelated characters
1998	Legends of the Earth God	土地公傳奇		several unrelated characters
1998	Women at Thirty	女人三十		
1999	Fragrance of Women	女人香	Hsu Hao-jan	
2000	Eldest Son's Wife	長男的媳婦	Wang Ching-mu	
2000	Give Daddy a Kiss	親親老爸	Weng Ming-hsuan	
2000	Happy Without You	無你較快活	Hsu Chih-hsiang	
2000	Feel for Others	將心比心	Wang Ming-te	
2001	The Husband-Pursuing Trio	追夫三人行	Chen Sang	
2001	Gazing at My Hometown	望鄉	Lin Yung-shou	
2001	Love and Honour	情義	Liu Cheng-yi	
2001	Father's Illegitimate Daughter	爸爸的私生女	Lee Yang-ming	
2002	Endless Love	不了情	Chiang Yung-ming	
2003	Upmost Sun	日正當中	Hsieh Kao-ming	
2004	Women Are Flowers at 40	女人40一枝花	Ting Yung-chun	
2004	The Unforgettable Memory	意難忘	Mai Kuo-chuan	
2005	The Sun of Life	生命的太陽	legislator	
2005	The Bright Moon over the Mortal World	明月照紅塵	Chen Hsi-hai	
2005	Eight Ounces of Gold	八两金	Chen Bo	
2005	Autumn Tide Toward the Evening Sky	秋潮向晚天	Guan Jianghao	remake of the 1983 series
2006	The Kid from Heaven	天堂來的孩子	Lo Yi-hsiang's father	
2006	The Success Story of a Formosa Girl	寶島少女成功記	Chao Chen-wei	
2006	The Spirits of Love	愛	Wu Chin-sheng	
2007	Wings of Angel	天使之翼	Hu Te-chang	
2008	Mom's House	娘家	Huang Ching-feng	
2009	See A-Lang Again	又見阿郎	Pai Hai-sheng	
2009	The Story of Parents' House	娘家的故事	Shen Wanhai	
2012	Pursuit	追逃	Meng Fanping	
2012	Feng Shui Family	風水世家	Lin Ching-shui	
2014	Dowry	嫁妝	Lee Ching-te	
2016	The King of Drama	阿不拉的三個女人	Huang Yun-chin	

== Awards and nominations ==
Year	#	Award	Category	Work	Result
Television (as actor)
1985	20th	Golden Bell Awards	Best Actor in a TV Series	Autumn Tide Toward the Evening Sky	Won
1997	32nd	Golden Bell Awards	Best Supporting Actor in a TV Series	Group Meal	Nominated
Television (as host)
1988	23rd	Golden Bell Awards	Best Host (Educational and Cultural Programme)	Productivity Square (生產力廣場)	Nominated
1989	24th	Golden Bell Awards	Best Host (Educational and Cultural Programme)	Productivity Square (生產力廣場)	Nominated
