= Li Zhisui =

Chinese-American physician and Mao Zedong's personal doctor and confidant (1919–1995)

- 李志绥
- Born: 30 December 1919; Beijing, Republican China
- Died: 13 February 1995 (aged 75); Carol Stream, Illinois, United States
- Citizenship: China; United States (since 1988)
- Education: West China Union University
- Occupation: Physician of Mao Zedong
- Notable work: Private Life of Chairman Mao
- Spouse: Lilian Wu Shenxian
- Children: Li Chong, Li Erchong

Li Zhisui (simplified Chinese: 李志绥; traditional Chinese: 李志綏; pinyin: Lǐ Zhìsuí; 30 December 1919 – 13 February 1995) was a Chinese American physician and Mao Zedong's personal doctor and confidant. He was born in Beijing, Republican China in 1919. He studied medicine during World War II at the Medical School of West China Union University. After emigrating to the United States, he wrote a biography of Mao entitled The Private Life of Chairman Mao, in which he described Mao as selfish, cruel, having a craving for young women, and poor personal hygiene. The biography was based on his recollection of journals he had kept, and later found expedient to destroy, while a doctor to Mao.

In the summer of 1968, during the Cultural Revolution, Mao's wife, Jiang Qing, placed Li's life in danger by accusing him of trying to poison her. Li managed to hide, living incognito with textile workers who were among the 30,000 Mao dispatched to Tsinghua University to quell the conflict between two warring factions of the Red Guards.

In October 1986, Li wrote the preface for the first Chinese textbook on psychopharmacology, Psychopharmacological Treatment for Psychiatric Disorders edited by Tsai Neng (蔡能) and Shi Hong-zhang (史鸿璋), and published by Shanghai Scientific Technology Publisher in May 1987.

On 13 February 1995, Li died following a heart attack at his son's house in Carol Stream, Illinois, where he had been living since emigrating.

== Life ==
Li Zhisui was born in Beijing on December 30, 1919. He was born into a family of doctors. His great-great-grandfather Li Deli was the left judge of the Imperial Medical Court during the Tongzhi period of the Qing dynasty. Li Zhisui graduated from the School of Medicine of West China Union University in Chengdu, Sichuan (now the West China Medical Center of Sichuan University). He later served as a military doctor of the Kuomintang and a ship doctor of Australia, treating common diseases such as colds, coughs, diarrhea, and insomnia.

In 1937, he joined the Renaissance Society. In 1945, he received a doctorate in medicine. In 1950, he became a doctor at the Xiangshan Medical Clinic. In 1951, he became a doctor at the Zhongnanhai Security Bureau Medical Clinic. In 1957, he was appointed as the personal health doctor of Mao Zedong, then Chairman of the Chinese Communist Party. From then on, Li Zhisui often regarded himself as Mao Zedong's personal doctor. From 1971 to 1972, he served as the leader of Mao Zedong's medical team until Mao's death in 1976. Li Zhisui also served as the director of the 305th Hospital of the Chinese People's Liberation Army. In 1980, he was appointed as the vice president of the Chinese Medical Association and the Chinese Gerontological Society, and served as the editor-in-chief of the Chinese versions of the Chinese Medical Journal and the American Medical Journal until he moved to the United States in 1988.

When he was appointed as Mao Zedong's personal physician in 1954 (Li claimed that it was 1954, but Jin Chongji believed that it was 1957 after verification), Li Zhisui recorded what he saw and heard on a daily basis, thus writing a very extensive diary. In 1966, due to the Red Guards' trend of house searches during the Cultural Revolution, the Li family burned the diary for fear of being implicated. After the Cultural Revolution ended in 1976, Li Zhisui's wife urged him to write about his previous experiences.

In 1988, he moved to the United States. In 1994, the Chinese version of Li Zhisui's The Private Life of Chairman Mao was published by China Times Publishing in Taiwan, and the English version was published by Random House in the United States. The book records Mao Zedong's disgraceful side, including his absurd hygiene habits, cruel political tactics, and corrupt and promiscuous private life. Voice of America believes that this book has caused outrage among the Chinese Communist Party leadership. It has also been rebutted by Wang Dongxing, Qi Benyu and other close staff members of Mao Zedong. For example, in 1997, Mingliu Publishing House published a book titled "Wang Dongxing Reveals Mao Zedong's Private Life" based on Wang Dongxing's dictation and compiled by Qiu Zhizhuo, rebutting Li Zhisui's book's false claims and attacks on Mao Zedong. The book also contains an open letter signed by Shi Zhe, Wang Dongxing, Ye Zilong and 135 others entitled "An Ugly Performance of Insulting China and Being Anti-Communist: Our Views on Li Zhisui and His "Memoirs"".

On February 13, 1995, Li Zhisui died of a heart attack in the bathtub of his home in Carol Stream, Illinois.

== Family ==
Li Zhisui and his wife Wu Shenxian had two sons: the eldest son Li Zhong and his eldest daughter-in-law Yang Balin; the second son Li Erzhong and his second daughter-in-law Li Mei.

== Work ==
- The Private Life of Chairman Mao: The Memoirs of Mao's Private Physician, publ. Random House, New York (1994), ISBN 0-679-76443-7
