= Fight Back to School =

1991 Hong Kong film by Gordon Chan

- DVD cover (South Korean version)
- Directed by: Gordon Chan
- Written by: Barry Wong; Gordon Chan
- Produced by: Wong Jing; Sunny Cheng
- Starring: Stephen Chow; Sharla Cheung; Ng Man-Tat; Roy Cheung; Barry Wong
- Cinematography: Cheng Siu-keung
- Edited by: Chan Ki-Hop
- Music by: Wong Pong
- Distributed by: Win's Movie Production & I/E Co. Ltd. Gala Film Distribution Limited
- Release date: 18 July 1991 (Hong Kong)
- Running time: 100 minutes
- Country: Hong Kong
- Language: Cantonese
- Box office: $43,829,449

Fight Back to School (simplified Chinese: 逃学威龙; traditional Chinese: 逃學威龍) is a 1991 Hong Kong action comedy film directed by Gordon Chan and co-written with Barry Wong, who also acts in a supporting role. The film stars Stephen Chow, Sharla Cheung, Ng Man-tat, and Roy Cheung. The film was released theatrically in Hong Kong on 18 July 1991.

It was one of the highest-grossing domestic films of all-time in Hong Kong. It was followed by sequels Fight Back to School II (1992) and Fight Back to School III (1993).

== Plot ==
Chow Sing-sing (Stephen Chow) is about to be disqualified from the Royal Hong Kong Police's elite Special Duties Unit (SDU) because of his complete disregard for his teammates during a training drill. However, a senior officer, Wong Sir (Barry Wong), who has taken to Sing's youthful demeanor, instead deploys him as an undercover student in the elite Edinburgh College to recover his stolen revolver. The undercover operation is made complicated when Sing is partnered with Tat (Ng Man-tat)—an ageing, incompetent police detective. Sing, who turned to the Police Academy because of his dislike for schooling, struggles to fit in academically. On just his third day at the school, Sing is on the verge of being expelled due to being caught cheating on a Chinese history test. Tat, who is listed on files as Sing's legal guardian, beats him ruthlessly after much prodding from the school's administrative staff. Miss Ho (Sharla Cheung), the school's guidance counselor, volunteers to personally tutor him.

The school bully, Johnny (Leung Sap-yat), challenges Sing to a fight on the school rooftop. Turtle Wong (Gabriel Wong), Sing's classmate who had also cheated on the Chinese history test but had been protected by Sing taking the blame, is the only one to take his side. Sing wins easily, earning the respect of his peers. With Miss Ho's help, Sing becomes a model student, in part due to his growing infatuation for her. This relationship puts her at further odds with her boyfriend, Detective Wong (Wong Chi-yeung), another fellow officer who is also investigating the arms traffickers suspected of stealing Wong's pistol. Already distasteful of police officers, Miss Ho is dismayed when she discovers both Sing and Tat's real identities and distances herself from the two. Later, she finds her boyfriend ruthlessly beating Sing, causing their relationship to end permanently.

After two months pass with little progress, Tat and Sing finally decide to pursue the arms traffickers and their boss, Teddy (Roy Cheung), who is also Johnny's older brother. Sing manages to escape from the lot with a truckload of weapons and returns Wong's stolen pistol, but accidentally leaves Tat behind with the criminals, who hold him captive. Sing rushes back to rescue him and the two flee back to the school with a suitcase containing the traffickers' money. The school is setting up a maze for seasonal festivities and Tat and Sing meander through it to escape their pursuers. Aided with the help of some of the students, the two are able to ward off their attackers, but just as Sing, Turtle, and Johnny rendezvous, the remaining students are captured at gunpoint by Teddy and his men. The trio are given five minutes to surrender, or the students will be executed. Sing overpowers Teddy's crew after Turtle and Johnny distract them, but Teddy then holds Miss Ho at gunpoint. Wong arrives in time to subdue and arrest Teddy with Sing's help. As Wong takes his leave, he spontaneously promotes Sing to Chief Inspector.

Sing says his final goodbyes to his classmates as his mission is complete. But as he turns to leave through the school's main gates, he and everyone else find Miss Ho seductively waiting for him.

== Cast ==
Cast and roles include:

- Stephen Chow as Star Chow / Chow Sing-Sing, undercover police
- Sharla Cheung as Miss Ho
- Ng Man-tat as Tso Tat-Wah / 'Uncle' Tat, undercover police
- Roy Cheung as Brother Big Teddy, an arms trafficking leader
- Barry Wong as Wong Sir, Chief Superintendent of Police, Chow and Uncle Tat's superior
- Gabriel Wong as Turtle Wong, Sing's classmate and ally
- Paul Chun as Lam Zuk-Duk, the school's Head of Discipline
- Dennis Chan
- Peter Lai (Chinese: 黎彼得, Lai Bei-Dak)
- Nicholas Laletin
- Roger Thomas
- Tsang Kan-Wing
- Karel Ng
- Kingdom Yuen as Miss Leung

== Award nominations ==
Accolades
Ceremony	Category	Recipient	Outcome
11th Hong Kong Film Awards	Best Director	Gordon Chan	Nominated
11th Hong Kong Film Awards	Best Screenplay	Barry Wong & Gordon Chan	Nominated
11th Hong Kong Film Awards	Best Actor	Stephen Chow	Nominated
11th Hong Kong Film Awards	Best Supporting Actor	Ng Man-tat	Nominated
