= Alain Roux (historian) =

French historian of modern China (1934/1935–2026)

Alain Roux (Chinese name: Chinese: 鲁林; pinyin: Lǔ Lín; 1934 or 1935 – 26 June 2026) was a French historian and sinologist who was a university professor emeritus at the National Institute of Oriental Languages and Civilizations (Inalco). His subjects concerned China and in particular Chinese workers in the 20th century, Chinese political elites in Republican China. He has also written substantial biographies of Chiang Kai-shek and Mao Zedong.

Roux obtained l'agrégation d’histoire in 1960, he was professor emeritus since 2002. His research focused on the Chinese labor movement in Shanghai before the Communist Party came to power in 1949, Shanghainese society during the Kuomintang era, and the intellectual Qu Qiubai.

Regarding the book Le Singe et le Tigre : Mao, un destin chinois published in 2009, the sinologist Lucien Bianco indicates that this monumental biography of Mao Zedong "is not only very detailed, it is reliable, generally accurate and always impartial" .

Roux died on 26 June 2026, at the age of 91.

== Publications ==
=== Books ===
- Le Singe et le Tigre: Mao, un destin chinois, Éditions Larousse, 2009. 1126 p ISBN 978-2-03-584581-8
- La Chine au XXe siècle. 4e éd., revue et complétée, Armand Colin, 2005. 248 p ISBN 978-2-200-26579-3.
- Le Casse-tête chinois. Trente ans de Chine socialiste vus par un communiste français, Éditions sociales, 1980 ISBN 978-220-905365-0
- Chiang Kaï-Shek. Le grand rival de Mao, Payet, 2016, 646 pages.
- with Xiaohong Xiao-Planes, Histoire de la République populaire de Chine, de Mao Zedong à Xi Jinping, Armand Colin, 2018, 352 p.
