= Part Time Job =

- Video cover art (with a different Chinese title)
- Traditional Chinese: 暑期工讀生
- Simplified Chinese: 暑期工读生
- Literal meaning: Work-Study Students During Summer Break
- Hanyu Pinyin: Shǔ Qí Gōng Dú Shēng
- Directed by: Lai Cheng-ying
- Written by: Chang Yung-hsiang
- Produced by: Jih-Shen Chiang
- Starring: Alan Tam; Ing Tsae-ling
- Cinematography: Huang Chiang-li
- Edited by: Chen Hung-min
- Music by: Huang Mou-shan
- Production company: Young Sun Productions
- Release date: 1980
- Running time: 91 minutes
- Country: Taiwan
- Language: Mandarin

Part Time Job is a 1980 Taiwanese romantic comedy film directed by Lai Cheng-ying, starring Alan Tam and Ing Tsae-ling as two college students on summer break who fall in love while working menial jobs.

== Plot ==
Liang Ta-cheng (Alan Tam), from a well-to-do Taipei family, wants to spend this year's summer break working instead of again spending time with his annoying American cousin Ellen (Lee Lieh), who has a crush on him. This proposal is immediately turned down by his rich father (Wei Su), who considers working menial jobs a disgrace, so Ta-cheng leaves home to join his college friends operating a restaurant. The restaurant struggles to make ends meet with too many workers, and some of the friends are forced to work elsewhere. Ho Kuo-juei finds a job in a hair salon, where he encounters and falls in love with Ellen.

Liang begins working as a superintendent in a residential building, and meets a young babysitter named Ah Hsiang (Ing Tsae-ling), whom he is instantly smitten with. Because of her work, he believes her to be from a low socioeconomic background, so he takes her to watch Taiwanese opera (which is enjoyed by mostly uneducated folks), not realizing Ah Hsiang feels exactly the same way about him. After getting fired for mistaking burglars as furniture movers, Liang follows Ah Hsiang to work as live-in servants in an estate, where their romance further develops. The family turns out to be highly dysfunctional, forcing them to quit their jobs. Ah Hsiang refuses to tell Liang her home address, and both are heartbroken. Having returned to college after the break, Liang attends a conference for an inter-collegiate association, and discovers the association president is none other than Ah Hsiang. Ah Hsiang is also shocked that Liang is a college student. The film ends with the pair catching the burglars, again posing as movers.

== Cast ==
- Alan Tam as Liang Ta-cheng
- Ing Tsae-ling as Ah Hsiang
- Wei Su as Mr. Liang, Ta-cheng's father
- Chang Ping-yu as Mrs. Liang
- Lee Lieh as Ellen, Ta-cheng's American cousin
- Lei Ming as Ellen's father
- Lin Tzay-peir as Ko Pen-yi, Liang's classmate
- Tsuei Shoou-pyng as classmate
- Chiu Yu-ting as classmate

== Theme songs ==
- "Zhe Yike Duo Qingsong" (這一刻多輕鬆; "So relaxing this time") performed by Alan Tam
- "Tanqilai, Changqilai" (彈起來，唱起來; "Let's Play the Guitar and Sing") performed by Alan Tam
- "Xunzao" (尋找; "Seek") performed by Alan Tam

All songs are included in Tam's 1980 Mandopop album Tanqilai, Changqilai.
