= Affectionately Yours (1985 film) =

1985 Hong Kong film by Wong Ying Kit

- Directed by: Ying Git Wong
- Written by: Barry Wong; Clarence Yip
- Produced by: Anthony Chow
- Starring: Maria Chung; Billy Lau; Shôji Nakayama
- Cinematography: Raymond Lam
- Release date: 9 April 1985
- Running time: 99 minutes

Affectionately Yours is a 1985 Hong Kong film directed by Wong Ying Kit. It stars Eric Tsang, Alan Tam and Maria Chung.

== Cast ==
- Maria Chung
- Billy Lau
- Shôji Nakayama
- Kai-Keung Sze
- Alan Tam
- Eric Tsang
- Yau Hung Yiu
