= Devil Returns =

1982 Taiwanese-Hong Kong film by Richard Chen

- Film poster
- Directed by: Richard Chen Yao-Chi
- Written by: Gu Bi; Cheung Wing-Cheung
- Produced by: Gung Gam-Sing; Chiang Xian-Cheng
- Starring: Feng-Jiao Lin; Alan Tam; Emily Y. Chang; Don Wong; George Wang; Sha-Fei Ouyang
- Cinematography: Chan Wing-Shu
- Edited by: Wang Chin-Chen
- Production company: Yung Sheng Film Company
- Release date: 1982 (Hong Kong)
- Running time: 88 minutes
- Countries: Taiwan; Hong Kong
- Language: Mandarin

Devil Returns (Original title Jing hun feng yu ye) as is a 1982 horror film directed by Richard Chen Yao-Chi, and written by Gu Bi and Cheung Wing-Cheung. The film is a Taiwanese-Hong Kong co-production.

== Plot ==
Mei-hsun Fang hails a taxicab, and is brought to an abandoned building by the driver, a wanted robber and serial rapist. The man beats and sexually assaults Mei-hsun, and leaves her for dead. Mei-hsun survives, and is able to identify her assailant in a police lineup, resulting in his execution by firing squad, an event which Mei-hsun witnesses in a dream the moment it occurs. The rapist's death does little to comfort Mei-hsun, who is plagued by nightmares and visions of the man, and is horrified to learn that she is pregnant with what she assumes is his child. Mei-hsun tries to have an abortion in secret, but as the procedure is about to begin, an invisible force attacks the doctor and nurse, and flings the former out a window.

In a last-ditch effort to get rid of the baby, which she is convinced is evil, Mei-hsun throws herself down a flight of stairs, though this merely causes the child to be born a month premature. While Mei-hsun's husband, nanny, and friends all believe he is normal, the baby is in fact supernatural, and torments his mother when no one else is around to witness his actions. One day, to try and put Mei-hsun at ease, the nanny suggests she take the child to a temple where exorcisms are performed, in attempt to rid the boy of whatever being she believes is corrupting him. The ceremony (during which the baby's head spins around, and objects break) is a success, and the child begins acting normal.

Enraged by what has been done to his son, Mei-hsun's rapist returns from beyond to take revenge, following the nanny to her home, and slamming her head onto a door hook. The nanny's young son visits Mei-hsun to ask if she has seen his mother, who Mei-hsun goes to look for, eventually stumbling onto her hidden body. Mei-hsun rushes home, where the killer murders a visiting female friend and her suitor, impaling the latter with a knife, and causing the former to bleed uncontrollably before asphyxiating her and crushing her head. The killer attacks Mei-hsun, who manages to fend him off long enough for her husband and a police officer to appear, and banish the undead madman by drenching him in wine, and shooting him several times.

== Cast ==
- Alan Tam as Lo Yu-ching
- Emily Cheung Ying-Chan as Mei-hsun Fang
- Wong Moon-Giu
- Joan Lin as Hsiao-ling Shen
- Don Wong Tao as Chief Inspector Tu Chang
- Ouyang Sha-fei as Mrs. Chou
- Tsai Hung
- Ngok Ling
- Richard Cui Shou-Ping as Lin Haui-teh
- Chan Chi-Jan as Ms. Kuo
- Lin Tzay-peir
- Lee Ying as The Exorcist
- Wong Bei-Dak
- Chan Wai-Lau
- Mang Yuen as Doctor
- Cheng Chuen-Man as Chou Hsiao-kang

== Reception ==
A one and a half out of five was awarded by Hysteria Lives!, which wrote that Devil Returns was woefully derivative of a number of superior works (the most prominent being Halloween) and a "schizophrenic" film, albeit one where "the last half an hour is pretty suspenseful – if obviously shamelessly unoriginal". The Bloody Pit of Horror gave Devil Returns two and a half stars out of five, stating "The first hour is very solid, the acting is good and the film effectively builds suspense throughout" and "The premise deals with post traumatic stress and postpartum depression, the fears of a first time mother that she won't be able to connect with her child and other female/mother centered issues in an insightful and interesting way..." before concluding that the film's shift into being a Halloween rip-off for the final third was "abrupt, random and basically ruins what had come before it".
