= If I Were for Real (film) =

1981 film

- Video cover art
- Chinese: 假如我是真的
- Hanyu Pinyin: Jiǎrú Wǒ Shì Zhēnde
- Directed by: Wang Toon
- Screenplay by: Chang Yung-hsiang
- Based on: If I Were for Real by Sha Yexin, Li Shoucheng and Yao Mingde
- Produced by: Jih-Shen Chiang
- Starring: Alan Tam; Nancy Hu; Hsiang Lin
- Cinematography: Lin Hung-chung
- Edited by: Hsieh I-hsiung
- Music by: Cary Chan
- Release date: 21 August 1981
- Running time: 99 minutes
- Country: Taiwan
- Language: Mandarin

If I Were for Real (Chinese: 假如我是真的) is a 1981 Taiwanese drama film directed by Wang Toon. It is an adaptation of the 1979 play of the same name by Sha Yexin, Li Shoucheng and Yao Mingde, set in mainland China. The film made some changes to the story to turn "the satirical comedy into political propaganda which condemns Chinese communism". The film was banned not only in mainland China (like the play), but also in British Hong Kong until 1989.

== Cast ==
- Alan Tam as Li Xiaozhang
- Nancy Hu as Zhou Minghua
- Hsiang Lin as Qiao Hong, an actress in the theatrical troupe
- Lin Tzay-peir as Yao Qing, son of Zhou Minghua's factory boss
- Chang Feng as Zhou Minghua's father
- Chang Ping-yu as Theatre Director Zhao
- Ma Chia-li as Division Head Qian
- Wei Su as Secretary Wu
- Lei Ming as Section Head Sun
- Wu Chiao-ling as Sun Juanjuan
- Ko Hsiang-ting as Farm Director Zheng
- Tsui Fu-sheng as Wang Yun, deputy mayor of Shanghai
- Ku Chun as Li Da

== Differences from the play ==
As a propaganda film that condemns communism, the film "in a total disregard of the inherent ambiguities in the play" made a number of "changes which drastically alter the meaning", according to Gilbert C. F. Fong.

- Characters associated with the Chinese government are demonized by removing positive traits. Farm Director Zheng, who displays some conscience in the play, is completely devoid of that in the film. The virtuous Venerable Comrade Zhang in the play becomes "cold, aloof, and keen on punishment instead of persuasion" Li Da and is given a much smaller role.
- The film introduces a crude, licentious, and corrupt character Wang Yun, (clearly fictitious) deputy mayor of Shanghai who keeps an innocent actress as his mistress, thus strengthening the negative impression associated with the ruling elite.
- In the film, Zhou Minghua's pregnancy is revealed much earlier than in the play. As a result, the opportunistic prankster Li Xiaozhang is seen in a much more positive light, as a hero fighting for the survival of his future family.
- The play ends with Li Xiaozhang on trial and Zhou Minghua in the hospital. In the film, Zhou Minghua drowns herself (and her unborn baby), while Li Xiaozhang cuts his wrist and inscribes with his blood the words "If I Were for Real" on the cell wall before his death. (In real life, the imposter Zhang Quanlong (张泉龙) on whom Li Xiaozhang is based, was released after 3 years in prison.)

== Theme song ==
Teresa Teng sang the theme song, which was included in her 1981 album of the same name. (In the film, Farm Director Zheng secretly listens to Teresa Teng's "When Will You Return?" and hides a picture of her on the back of a Chairman Mao portrait.)

== Awards and nominations ==
1981 18th Golden Horse Awards

- Won—Best Film
- Won—Best Adapted Screenplay (Chang Yung-hsiang)
- Won—Best Actor (Alan Tam)
- Nominated—Best Cinematography (Lin Hung-chung)
- Nominated—Best Art Direction (Wang Toon)

The film was also selected as the Taiwanese entry for the Best Foreign Language Film at the 54th Academy Awards, but was not accepted as a nominee.

== See also ==
- List of submissions to the 54th Academy Awards for Best Foreign Language Film
- List of Taiwanese submissions for the Academy Award for Best Foreign Language Film
