= Spring Fever (1981 film) =

- video cover art (with a different Chinese title)
- Traditional Chinese: 吾
- Simplified Chinese: 吾
- Literal meaning: My Daughter Has Just Grown Up
- Hanyu Pinyin: Wú Jiā Yǒu Nǚ Chū Zhǎng Chéng
- Directed by: Su Yueh-ho
- Written by: Wu Nien-jen
- Produced by: Feng Chih-chia
- Starring: Pon Sheh-fuen; Alan Tam; Li Daw-horng; Chang Yng-jen; Lin Tzay-peir; Tsuei Shoou-pyng
- Cinematography: Kuo Mu-sheng
- Edited by: Chao Hsiung-cheng
- Music by: Huang Mou-shan
- Production company: Yong Sheng Film
- Release date: 1981
- Running time: 88 minutes
- Country: Taiwan
- Language: Mandarin

Spring Fever is a 1981 Taiwanese comedy film directed by Su Yueh-ho and written by Wu Nien-jen, starring Pon Sheh-fuen and Hong Kong singer Alan Tam as two college freshmen falling in love.

== Plot ==
Athletic, kind and magnetic, freshman class rep Sun Ya-fang is adored by everyone, including shy classmate Yang Chia-chung and brash upperclassman Chen Yu-jen. Chen clumsily courts Sun, but Sun doesn't like him at all. Sun is unhappy with Yang for not participating in class activities, but changes her mind after learning that he must work after school to support himself and his younger sister because they are orphaned. She begins to like him especially after a class field trip. Yang decides to write her a love letter and make his feelings known. Unfortunately, the letter gets delivered to the wrong girl: now Sung Ming-yuan is ecstatic, much to the disappointment of Sun. Yang doesn't know how to clear up the misunderstanding without hurting Sung, so he reluctantly goes out with her. Meanwhile, Sun spends her days hanging out with George Kao, her American cousin vacationing in Taiwan. Yang feels jealous and upset, but thankfully for him Kao and Sung meet and fall in love. (They eventually become engaged despite Sung's protective father vehemently forbidding them from dating in the beginning.) Yang can no longer hide his feelings. Playing his guitar, he sings a love ballad in front of Sun's house until the neighbors call the police. Sun feels embarrassed but finally gets together with him after a harmless bicker. The film ends with them happily in love.

== Cast ==
- Pon Sheh-fuen as Sun Ya-fang, the unselfish and charismatic leader of the freshman class. Though very pretty, she is tomboyish and teaches taekwondo to young kids in her free time.
- Chang Yng-jen as Sung Ming-yuan, the only other girl in the freshman class. She enjoys music and craves for love.
- Alan Tam as Yang Chia-chung, a quiet freshman who eventually falls in love with Sun Ya-fang. Having lost his parents, he supports the education of himself and his younger sister by working as a taxi driver after school. He also plays the guitar.
- Lin Tzay-peir as Chen Yu-jen, an upperclassman in the Student Association. He drives a jeep and tries to court Sun Ya-fang unabashedly (and rather clumsily).
- Li Daw-horng as George Kao, Sun Ya-fang's crazy American-born cousin who visits Taiwan during a break. He claims to have dated more than 80 girls in America. He finally finds love with Sung Ming-yuan and decides to marry her.
- Tsuei Shoou-pyng as Sun Ming-liang, Ya-fang's eldest brother, a nerd who speaks just everything in classical Chinese. He has sent 84 love letters to a nerdy girl to no avail.
- Teng Jue-jen as Sun Ming-tsung, Ya-fang's second brother, a player who tries to date 10 girls at once with no success.
- Kao Ming as Mr. Sun, Ya-fang's father
- Chang Ping-yu as Mrs. Sun
- Wei Su a Mr. Sung, Ming-yuan's overprotective father.
- Li Kuo-hsiu as Tsao Shan-hsien, a nerd in the freshman class.
- Tao Shu as Tsao Shan-hsien's mother.

== Theme songs ==
Teresa Teng sang the theme songs of the film, both composed by Chen Hsin-yi with lyrics by Chuang Nu:

- "Nanwang de Yanjing" (難忘的眼睛; "Unforgettable Eyes") — included in Teng's 1981 album Boat People (水上人)
- "Qingfeng" (輕風; "Breeze") — included in Teng's 1981 album If I Were for Real (Polydor version only)
