= Zhang Yufeng =

Private secretary to Mao Zedong (born 1945)

- 张玉凤
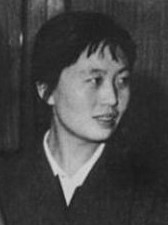
- Yufeng in 1972
- Born: 9 January 1945 (age 81); Botankou, Manchukuo
- Other name: Xiao Zhang ('Little Zhang')
- Known for: Private secretary of Mao Zedong
- Spouse: Liu Aimin (m. 1967)
- Children: 2

Zhang Yufeng (Chinese: 张玉凤; pinyin: zhāng yùfèng; born 9 January 1945) is a Chinese former political figure, who was the private secretary of the Chairman of the Chinese Communist Party Mao Zedong. She lived at his side from 1962, and carried the title of private secretary until the last years of Mao's life.

== Early life ==
Zhang was born on 9 January 1945 into a poor family in Manchukuo. Her father was a trader, according to other sources, a railway employee. The family consisted of eight children, and Zhang was the fourth among them. She graduated from primary school after six grades. At the age of 14, she began working as a conductor on the Mudanjiang-Beijing railway. In 1963, she was assigned as a conductor on Mao Zedong's personal train.

== Personal secretary of Mao Zedong ==
According to Russian sinologist Alexander Pantsov, Mao's acquaintance with Zhang happened at the end of 1962:

Naive and shy, like many young Chinese women, she at the same time had a very strong character, was quick-witted and sharp-tongued. And most importantly - amazingly beautiful!

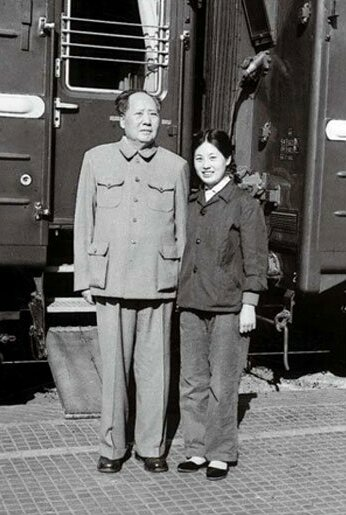
Zhang Yufeng with Mao Zedong in 1964

Zhang Yufeng was introduced to Mao by his personal bodyguard Wang Dongxing. After the first meeting, Wang asked Mao if he wanted Zhang to serve in his compartment. Mao agreed and after that, their rapprochement took place very quickly. Zhang Yufeng accompanied Mao on his travels around the country, and soon she became his trusted secretary and, as reported by many Western and Chinese media, began to play the role of his main companion.

At the height of the Cultural Revolution in the mid-1960s, Mao spent his free time surrounded by numerous seventeen and eighteen-year-old girls from time to time, but always spent most of his time with Zhang Yufeng. According to the French sinologist Alain Roux, until 1970, Mao had suspicions of Zhang, as he learned that her real father was supposedly a Japanese dentist and not a Chinese railway worker, and assumed that she could turn out to be a Japanese spy. But in 1970, she was appointed as Mao's secretary of household affairs. From that moment on, she constantly accompanied Mao. Due to her position, she was able to comfortably house her parents in an apartment in Beijing.

Zhang supported Mao Zedong during his historical meeting with U.S. President Richard Nixon. By 1973, Zhang Yufeng had become the main go-between Mao and the rest of the world. Even Mao's wife, Jiang Qing, could not visit her husband without Zhang's permission. There was an instance when Zhang did not let the Premier of China Zhou Enlai see Mao.

Mao's health declined in his last years, probably aggravated by his heavy chain-smoking. He developed Amyotrophic Lateral Sclerosis, known in the United States as Lou Gehrig's disease. At this time, the political weight of Zhang especially increased because Mao's speech became completely unintelligible due to illness, and only Zhang understood him well. From 1972, Zhang Yufeng helped Mao Zedong to eat and decided if he was able to receive visitors or not. By the summer of 1974, Mao's state of health had deteriorated so much that Zhang was able to understand him by the movement of his lips and gestures. At the end of 1974, Zhang was formally appointed Mao's secretary for critical and confidential assignments. She strictly controlled and restricted access to Mao. Jiang Qing, who desperately needed Mao's support in the internal party struggle, tried to appease Zhang, but failed.

In 1974, according to the sinologist Jonathan Spence:

She [Zhang] literally becomes Mao's interface with the world, in fact the latter can no longer speak and she deciphers Mao's stammerings by reading his lips.

Zhang recalled Mao's last Spring Festival, during which he was alone without a family member by his side:

The dinner the day before, I was the one who fed the Chairman. It was difficult for him to open his mouth to eat. That day, as always, he ate in bed some rice and some Wuchang fish that he loves so much. Here is his last dinner of the day before.

Mao died on 9 September 1976. According to academic Perry Link, immediately after the death of Mao, it is believed that it was Zhang who prevented Jiang Qing from taking possession of Mao's archives, which contained a large amount of compromising material on the entire top leadership of the Chinese Communist Party. She handed the key to the archives to Mao's successor Hua Guofeng. Knowing all the subtleties of the last years of Mao's life, Zhang acted as an important witness at the trial of the Gang of Four, including that of Jiang Qing.

== Later life ==
After the end of Cultural Revolution, she left Zhongnanhai and was transferred to the First Historical Archives of China. Later, she was transferred back to the Ministry of Railways due to personal wishes. Now, she is mainly engaged in the study of Mao Zedong's collection of books. She has compiled 24 volumes of "Mao Zedong's Collection".

In 2004, Zhang disclosed some details of Mao Zedong's final years to the CCP Central Committee.

Since 2008, some articles claimed that Zhang Yufeng had recalled several historical decisions made during Mao Zedong’s later years and had written a memoir that the central authorities deemed to “damage Mao’s image.” In response, Wang Dongxing, Yang Yinlu—the secretary to Jiang Qing—and Mao Zedong’s nephew, Mao Yuanxin, all refuted these claims. Zhang Yufeng also issued statements in 2018 and 2025, asserting that she had never published any memoirs.

On 9 September 2016, on the 40th anniversary of Mao Zedong's death, Zhang Yufeng and her husband paid respects to Mao at his mausoleum. The couple reunited with Mao's son-in-law Wang Jingqing, daughter Li Na and grandson Mao Xinyu.

Currently, Zhang together with Li Na, owns the restaurant Mao Jia Tai ('Dishes from the Mao Family Menu').

== Personal life ==
In 1967, Zhang married Liu Aimin. Liu was a guard at Zhongnanhai and later served as the director of Ministry of Railways. They married in accordance to instructions from Mao.

Zhang and Liu have two daughters. Their eldest daughter, after finishing university in Beijing, went to the United States to obtain her doctorate degree and settled there. Their youngest daughter serves as gynecologist and obstetrician at a hospital in Beijing.

== Bibliography ==
- Pantsov, Alexander V.; Levine, Steven I. (2012). Mao: The Real Story (Hardcover). Simon and Schuster. ISBN 978-1-4516-5447-9.
- Domenach, Jean-Luc (2012). Mao, sa cour et ses complots. Derrière les Murs rouges (Paperback). Fayard. ISBN 978-2-213-66174-2.
- Terill, Ross (1999). Madame Mao: The White Boned Demon (Hardcover). Stanford University Press. ISBN 978-0-688-02461-1.
- Devin, Delia (2013). Mao: A Very Short Introduction (Very Short Introductions) (Paperback). Oxford University Press. ISBN 978-0-19-958866-4.
- Roux, Alain (2009). Le singe et le tigre - mao, un destin chinois (Paperback). Larousse. ISBN 978-2-03-584581-8.
