= 18th Golden Horse Awards =

Award ceremony for Chinese-language films of 1980 and 1981

- Date: October 30, 1981
- Site: Kaohsiung Cultural Center, Kaohsiung, Taiwan
- Hosted by: Li Tao and Josephine Siao
- Organized by: Taipei Golden Horse Film Festival Executive Committee

Highlights
- Best Feature Film: If I Were for Real
- Best Director: Tsui Hark; All the Wrong Clues for the Right Solution
- Best Actor: Alan Tam; If I Were for Real
- Best Actress: Sylvia Chang; My Grandfather
- Most awards: All the Wrong Clues for the Right Solution (3); If I Were for Real (3)
- Most nominations: All the Wrong Clues for the Right Solution (6)

Television in Taiwan
- Channel: CTS

The 18th Golden Horse Awards (Mandarin:第18屆金馬獎) took place on October 30, 1981 at the Kaohsiung Cultural Center in Kaohsiung, Taiwan.

== Winners and nominees ==
Winners are listed first and highlighted in boldface.

**Best Feature Film**: **If I Were for Real**; Fellow Students; My Grandfather; All the Wrong Clues for the Right Solution; The Coldest Winter in Peking; A Man of Immortality	**Best Documentary**: **Hai Yang Mu Chang Zhi Kai Fa 海洋牧場之開發**; Kua Hai Hong Qiao 跨海長虹
**Best Animation**: **Old Master Q**	**Best Director**: **Tsui Hark — All the Wrong Clues for the Right Solution**; Lin Ching-chieh — Fellow Students; Patrick Tam — Love Massacre
**Best Leading Actor**: **Alan Tam — If I Were for Real**; Tony Liu — A Man of Immortality; Heung Wan-pang — Fellow Students	**Best Leading Actress**: **Sylvia Chang — My Grandfather**; Sibelle Hu — The Coldest Winter in Peking; Ying Tsai-ling— The Unsinkable Miss Calabash
**Best Supporting Actor**: **George Wang — The Coldest Winter in Peking**; Liu Yan-fang — The Coldest Winter in Peking; Mu Si-cheng — A Sword Named Revenge	**Best Supporting Actress**: **Wang Lai — The Unsinkable Miss Calabash**; Wu Su-chu — Sailing for Tomorrow; Gua Ah-leh — The Story of Daniel
**Best Child Star**: **Cheng Chuan-wen — My Native Land**; Zhang Xiang — A Man of Immortality; Wan Wan — Once Again with Love	**Best Original Screenplay**: **Wu Nien-jen — Fellow Students**; Raymond Wong and Szeto Cheuk-hon — All the Wrong Clues for the Right Solution; Lin Ching-chieh — Student Days
**Best Adapted Screenplay**: **Chang Yung-hsiang — If I Were for Real**; Li Han-hsiang — The Tiger and the Widow	**Best Cinematography**: **Bill Wong — All the Wrong Clues for the Right Solution**; Lin Hung-chung — If I Were for Real; Brian Lai — Love Massacre
**Best Film Editing**: **Tony Chow — All the Wrong Clues for the Right Solution**; Wang Chin-chen — The Coldest Winter in Peking; Peter Cheung — The Big Brawl	**Best Art Direction**: **Chen Ching-shen — The Tiger and the Widow**; William Chang — All the Wrong Clues for the Right Solution; Wang Toon — If I Were for Real
**Best Costume Design**: **Lee Yen-ping — The Tiger and the Widow**; Lee Fu-hsiung — A Man of Immortality; Lu Chien-ming — A Sword Named Revenge	**Best Original Film Score**: **Li Tai-hsiang — A Sword Named Revenge**; Li Tai-hsiang — The Unsinkable Miss Calabash; Weng Ching-hsi — My Native Land
**Best Original Film Song**: **Weng Ching-hsi — My Native Land**; Li Tai-hsiang — Sailing for Tomorrow; Shi Dongrong — A Sword Named Revenge	**Best Sound Recording**: **Kwong Hu — Love Massacre**; Lin Kun-chi — Sailing for Tomorrow; Wang Yung-fang — My Native Land
**Special Era Significance Award**: **The Coldest Winter in Peking**	**Special Award**: **Wang Yin**
