= Golden Horse Award for Best Art Direction =

Taiwanese film award

- Awarded for: Best Art Direction
- Location: Taiwan
- Presented by: Taipei Golden Horse Film Festival Executive Committee
- First award: 1965
- Currently held by: Mak Kwok-keung and Renee Wong for Limbo (2022)
- Website: www.goldenhorse.org.tw

The Golden Horse Award for Best Art Direction (Chinese: 金馬獎最佳美術設計) is an award presented annually at the Golden Horse Awards by the Taipei Golden Horse Film Festival Executive Committee. The latest ceremony was held in 2022, with Mak Kwok-keung and Renee Wong winning the award for the film Limbo.
