= Golden Horse Award for Best Director =

Award for film directing

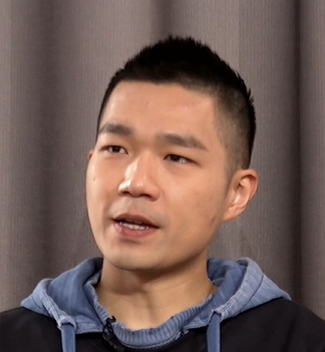
- The 2025 recipient: Jun Li
- Awarded for: Excellence in film directing
- Country: Taiwan
- Presented by: Taipei Golden Horse Film Festival Executive Committee
- First award: 1962
- Currently held by: Jun Li for Queerpanorama (2025)
- Website: goldenhorse.org.tw

The Golden Horse Award for Best Director (Chinese: 金馬獎最佳導演) is presented annually at Taiwan's Golden Horse Film Awards.

Taiwanese directors Li Hsing and Hou Hsiao-hsien, along with Hong Kong directors Ann Hui and Johnnie To, share the record for the most wins in this category, with three each. Hou, To, and Malaysian director Tsai Ming-liang hold the record for the most nominations, with eight.

== Winners and nominees ==
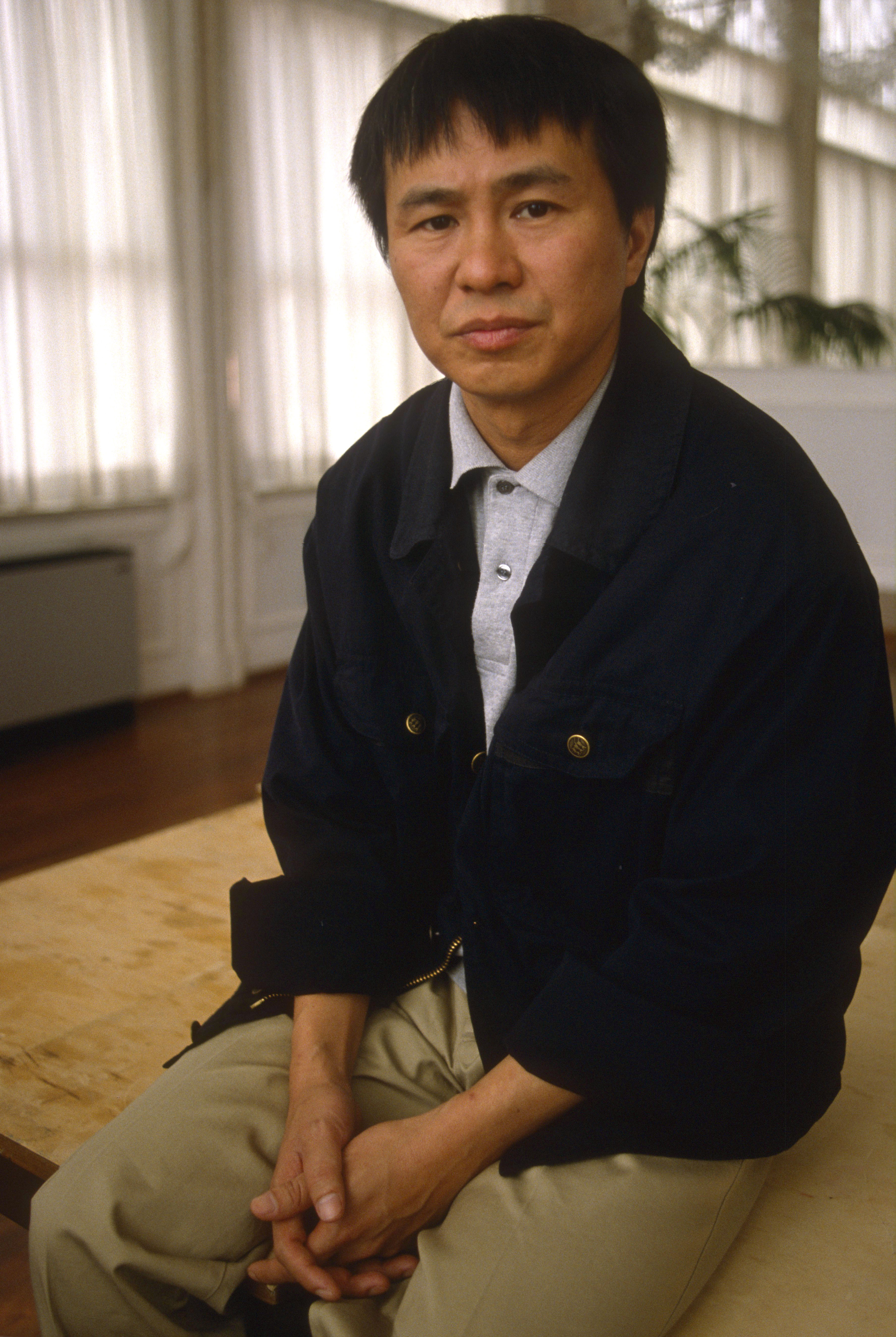
Hou Hsiao-hsien won thrice, for A City of Sadness (1989), Good Men, Good Women (1995), & The Assassin (2015).

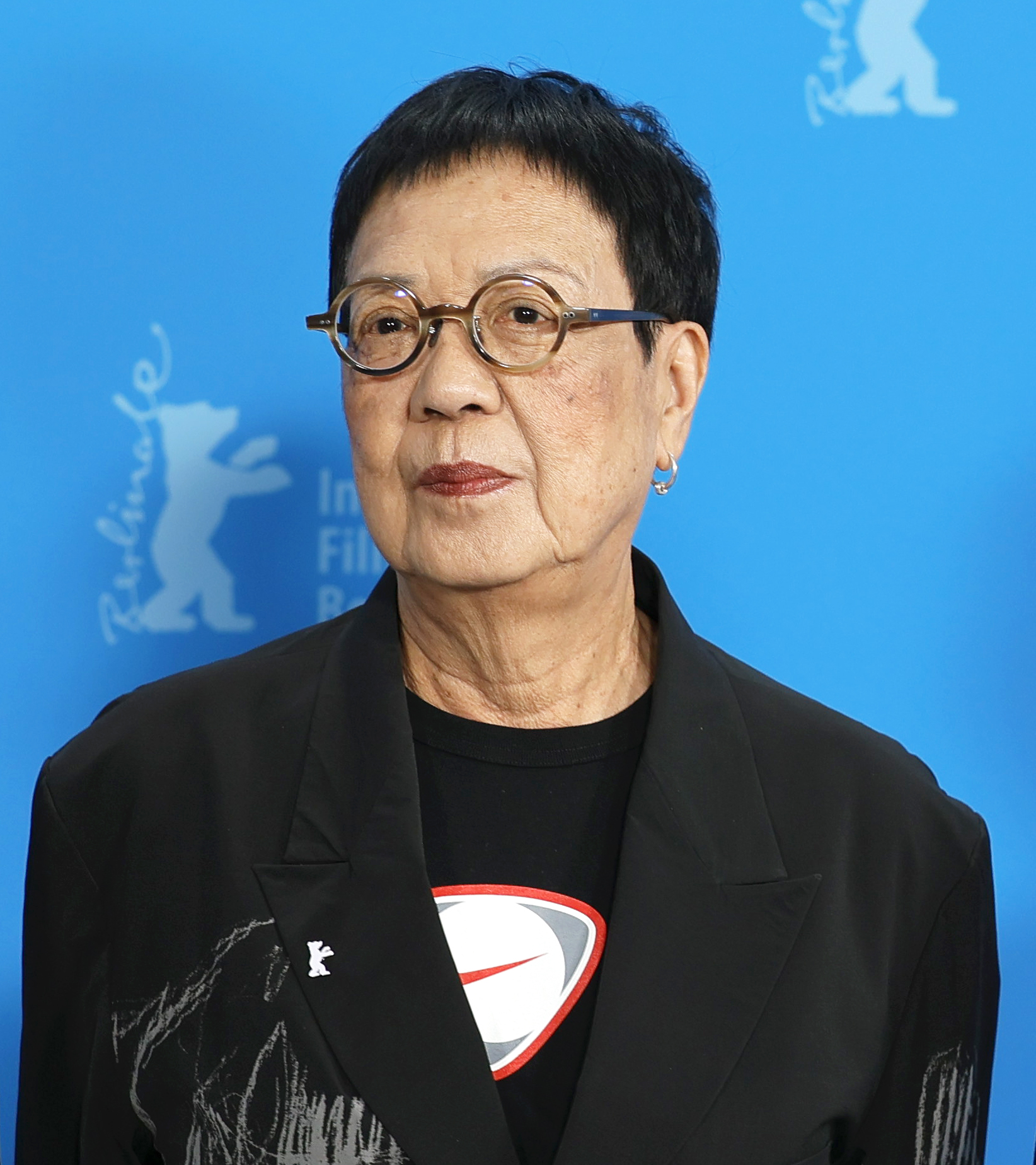
Ann Hui won thrice, for Ordinary Heroes (1999), A Simple Life (2011), & The Golden Era (2014).

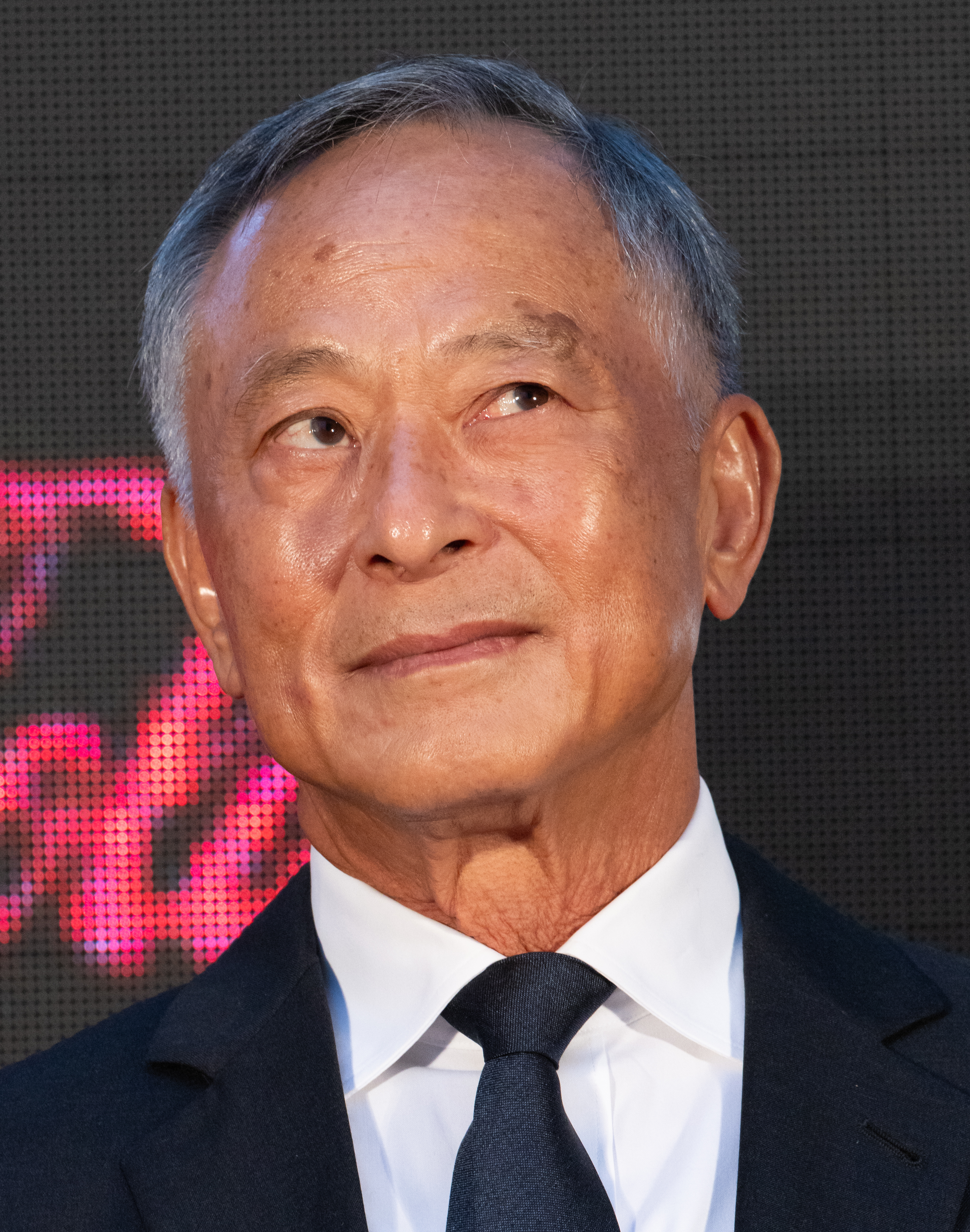
Johnnie To won thrice, for The Mission (1999), Breaking News (2004), & Life Without Principle (2011).

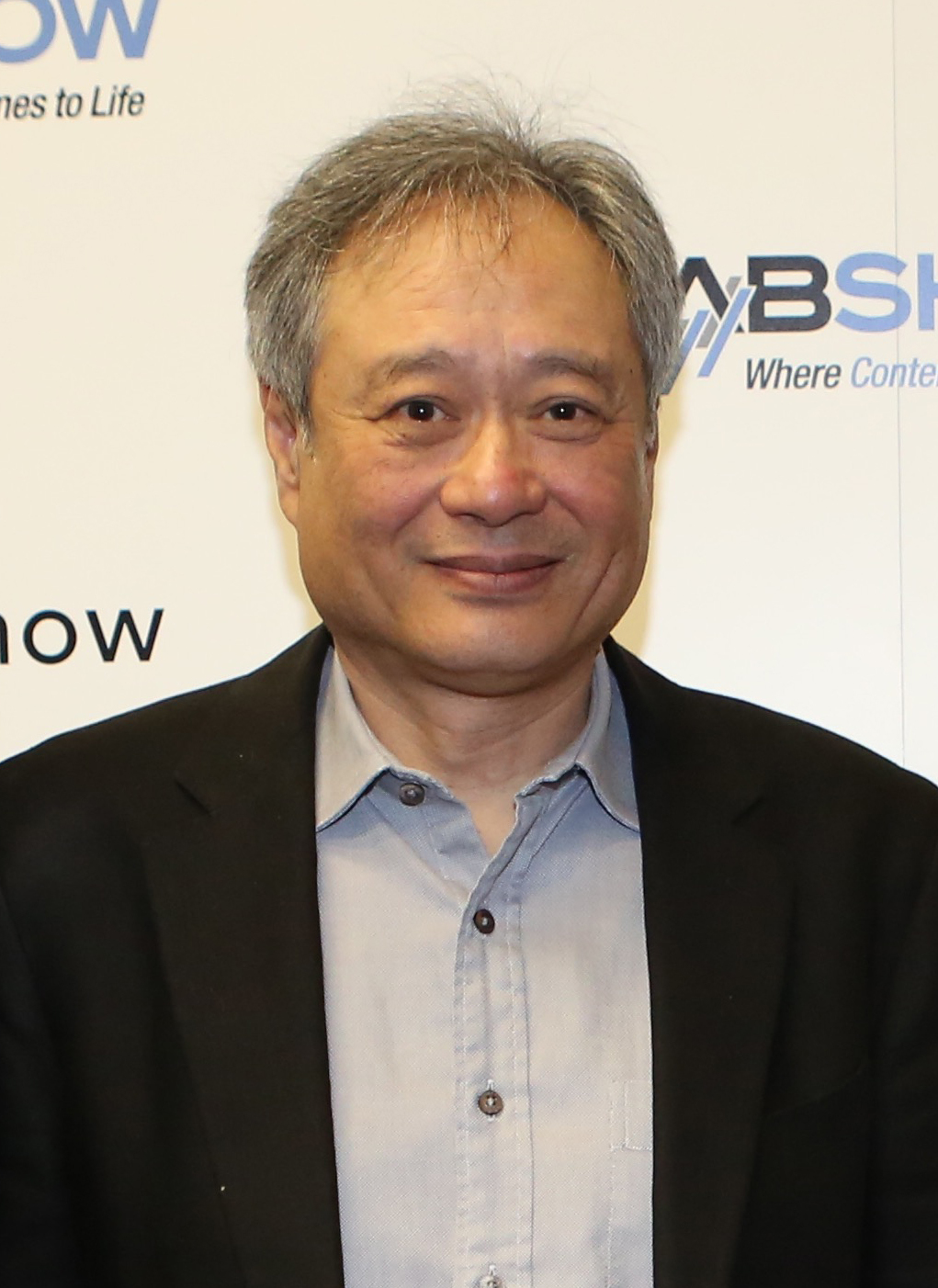
Ang Lee won twice, for The Wedding Banquet (1993) & Lust, Caution (2007).

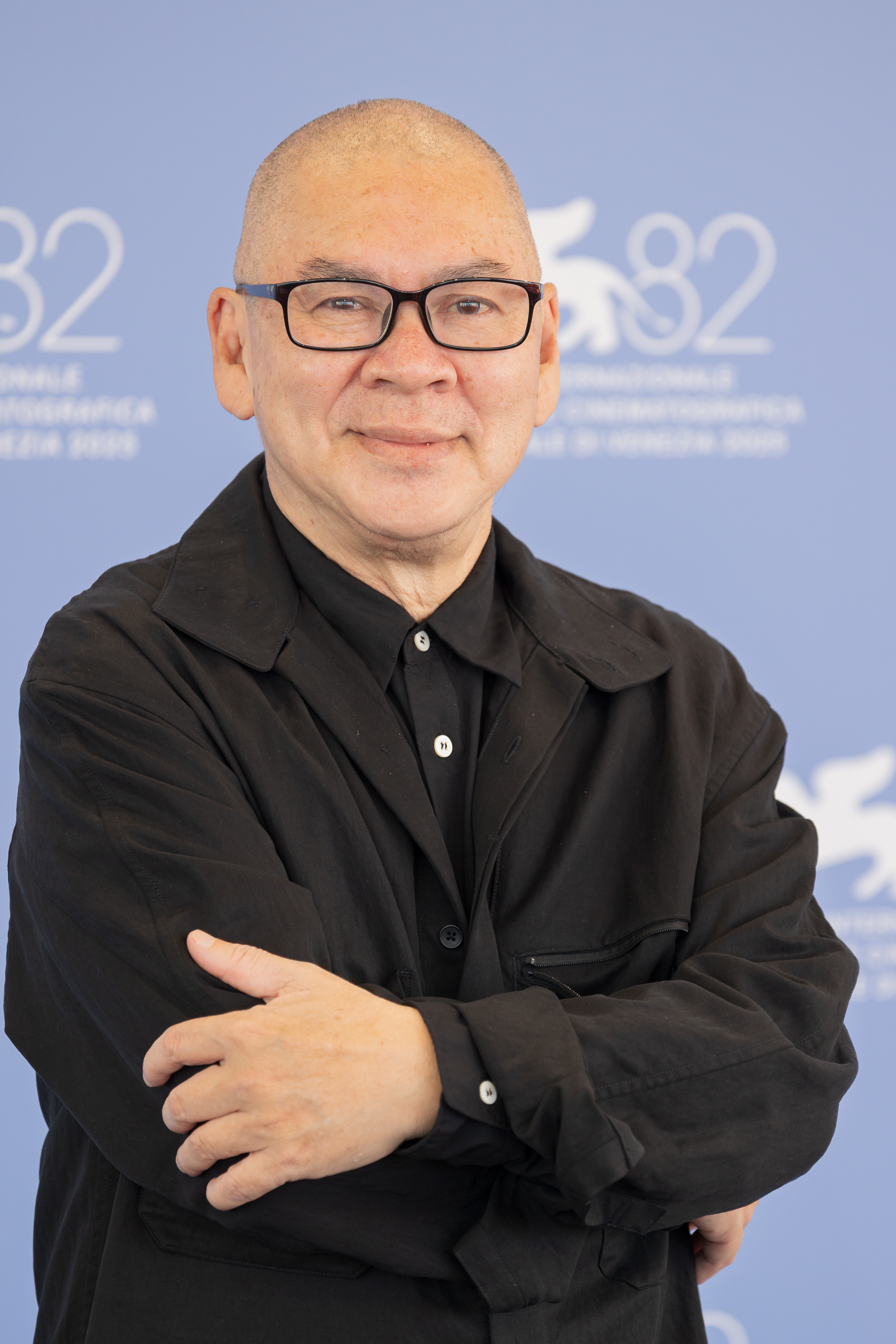
Tsai Ming-liang won twice, for Vive l'amour (1994) & Stray Dogs (2013).

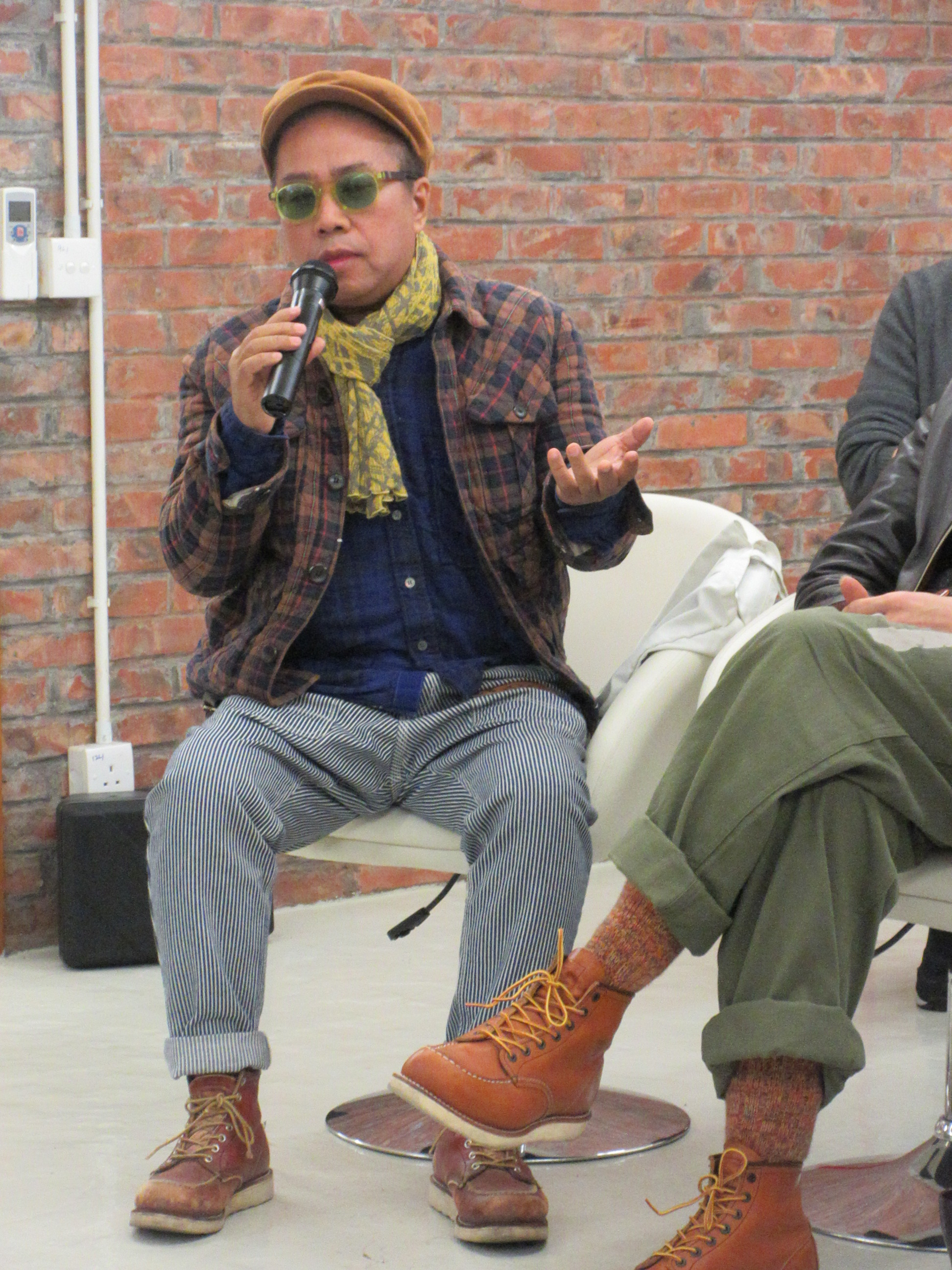
Fruit Chan won twice, for Made in Hong Kong (1997) & Hollywood Hong Kong (2001).

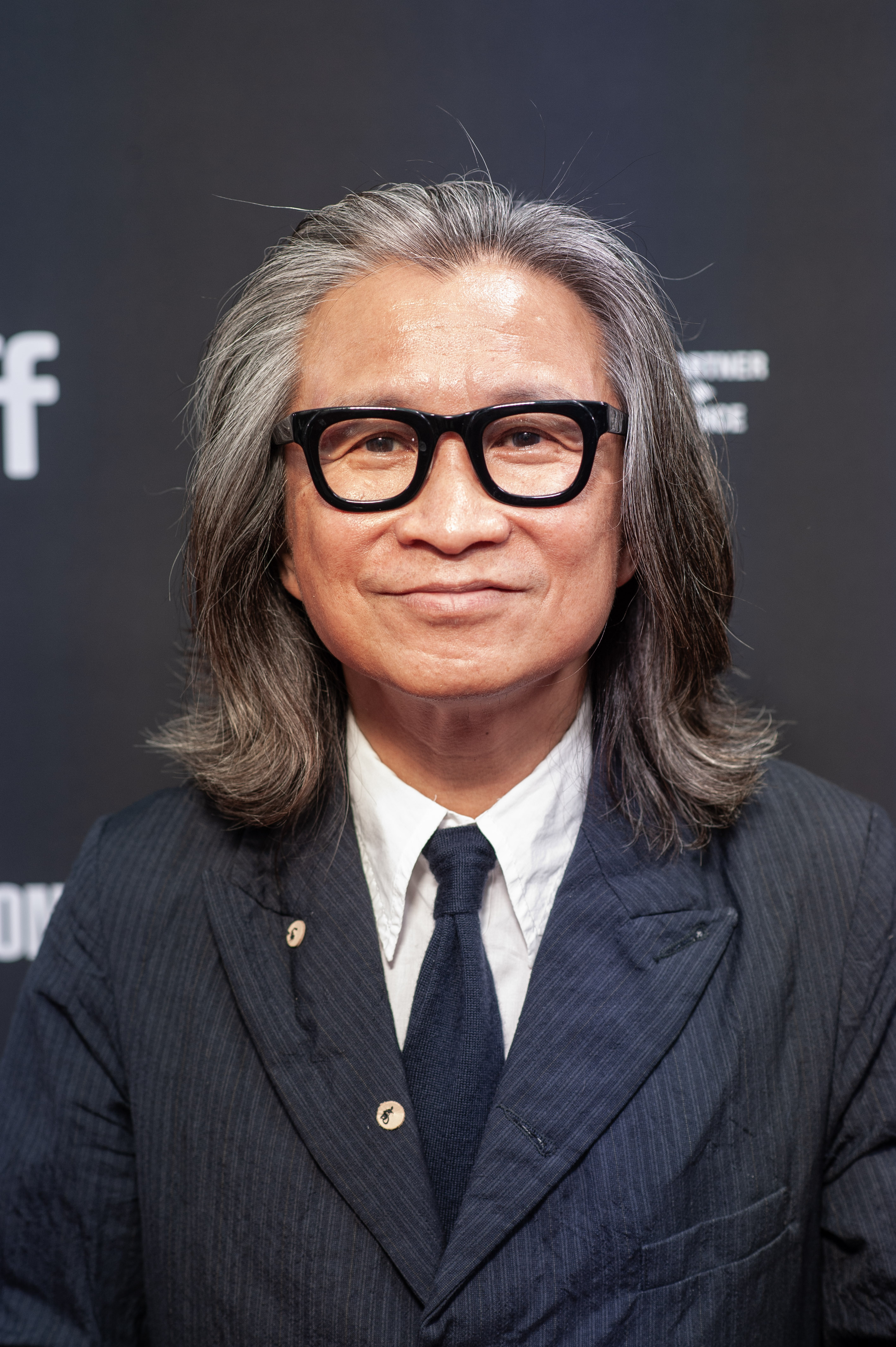
Peter Chan won twice, for Perhaps Love (2005) & The Warlords (2007).

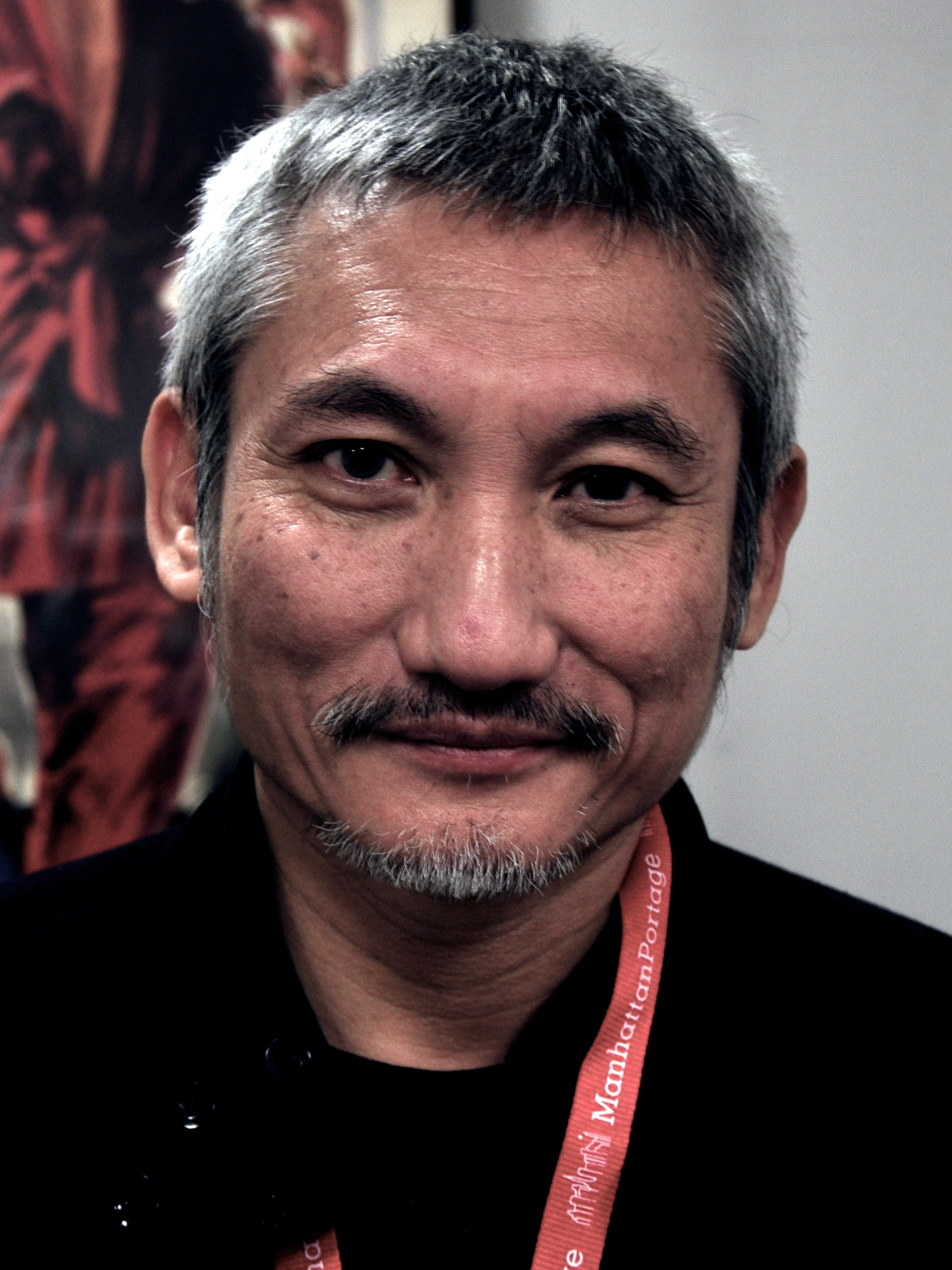
Tsui Hark won for All the Wrong Clues for the Right Solution (1981).

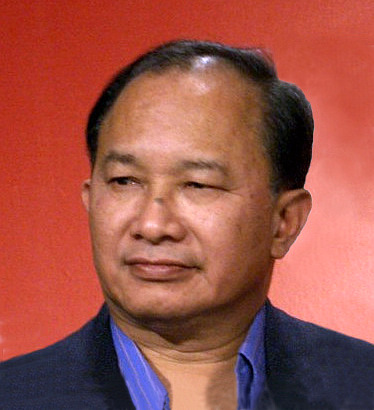
John Woo won for A Better Tomorrow (1986).

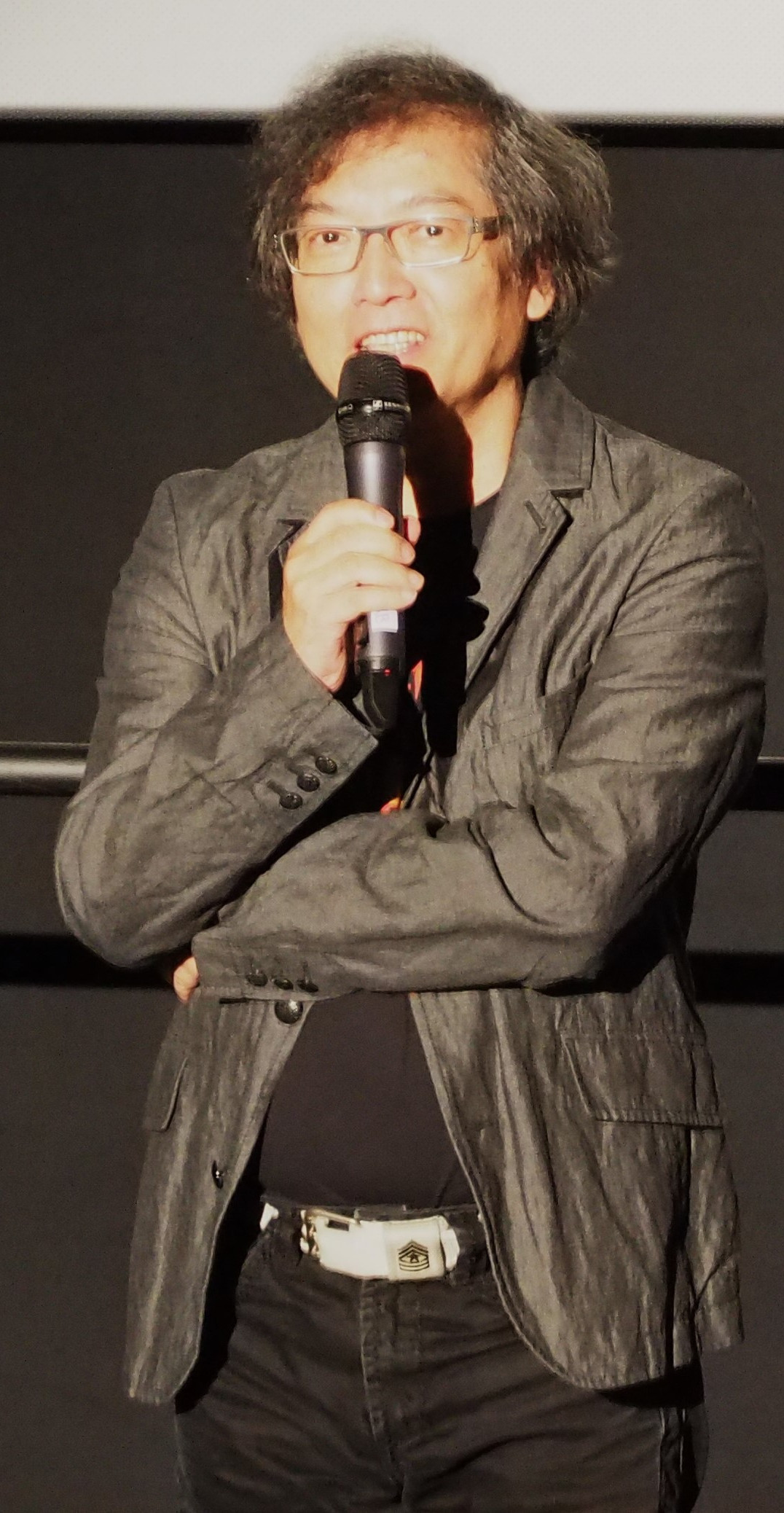
Alex Law won for Painted Faces (1988).

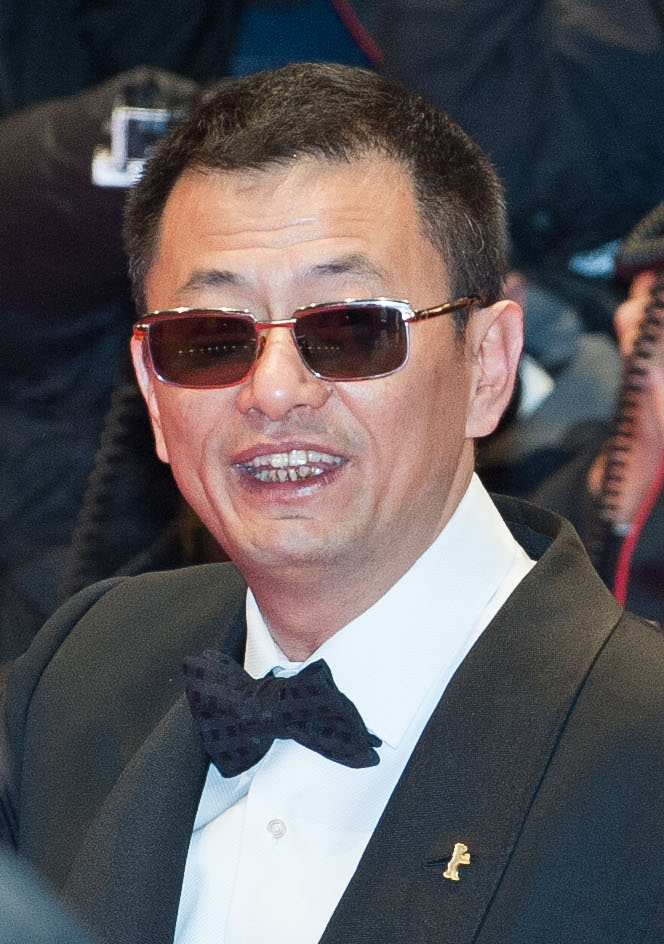
Wong Kar-wai won for Days of Being Wild (1990).

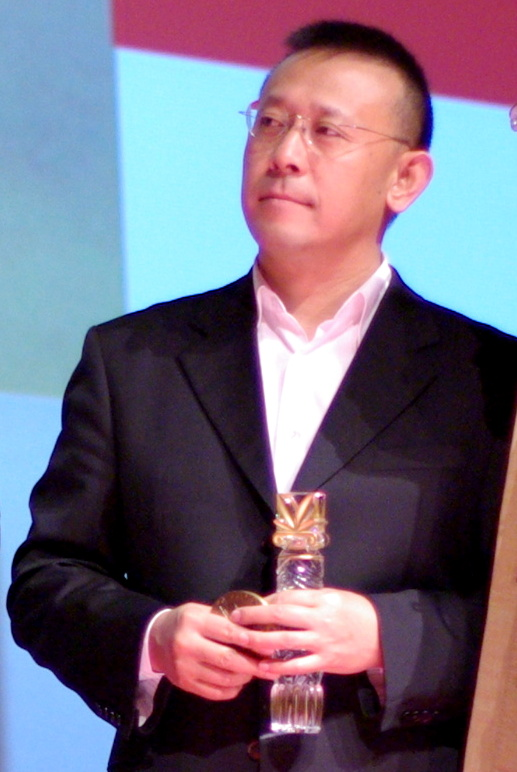
Jiang Wen won for In the Heat of the Sun (1994).

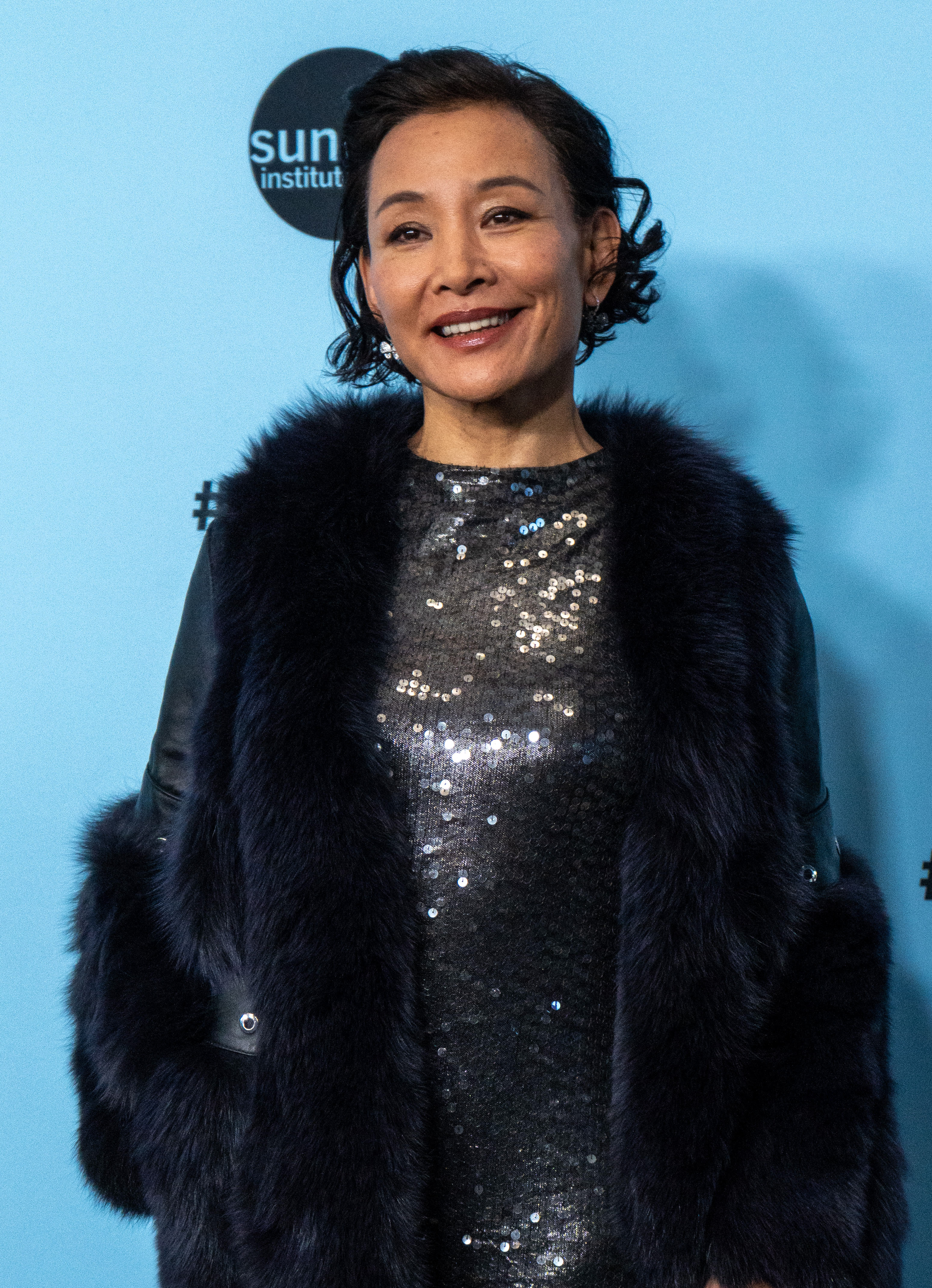
Joan Chen won for Xiu Xiu: The Sent Down Girl (1998).

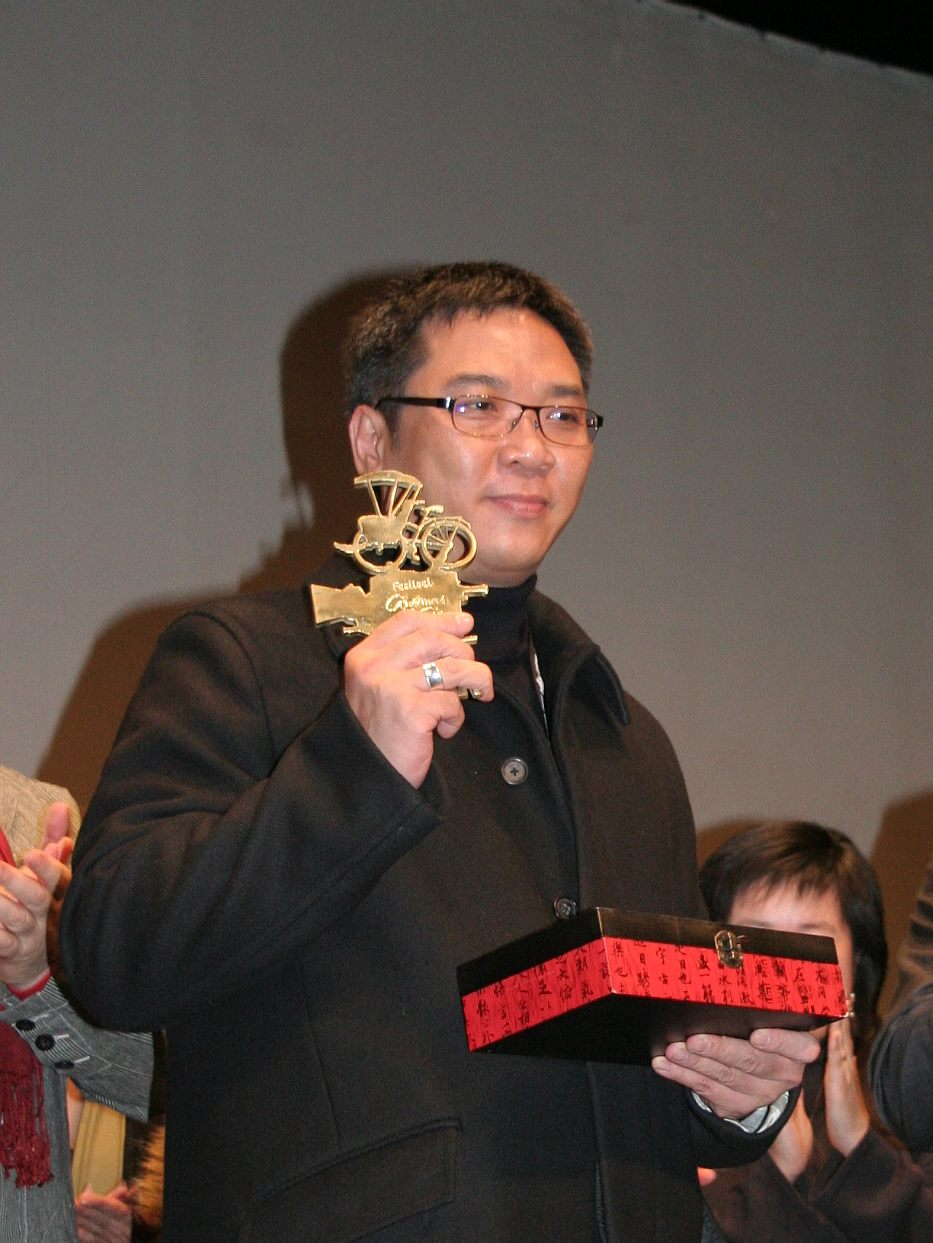
Stanley Kwan won for Lan Yu (2001).

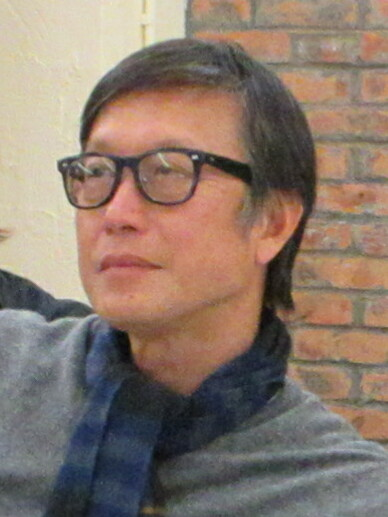
Andrew Lau co-won for Infernal Affairs (2002).

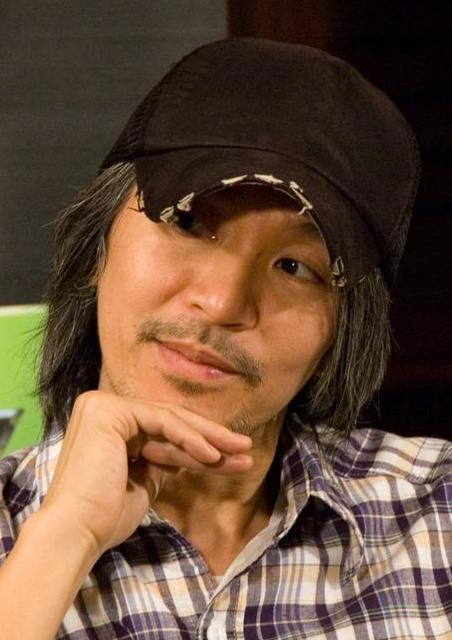
Stephen Chow won for Kung Fu Hustle (2004).

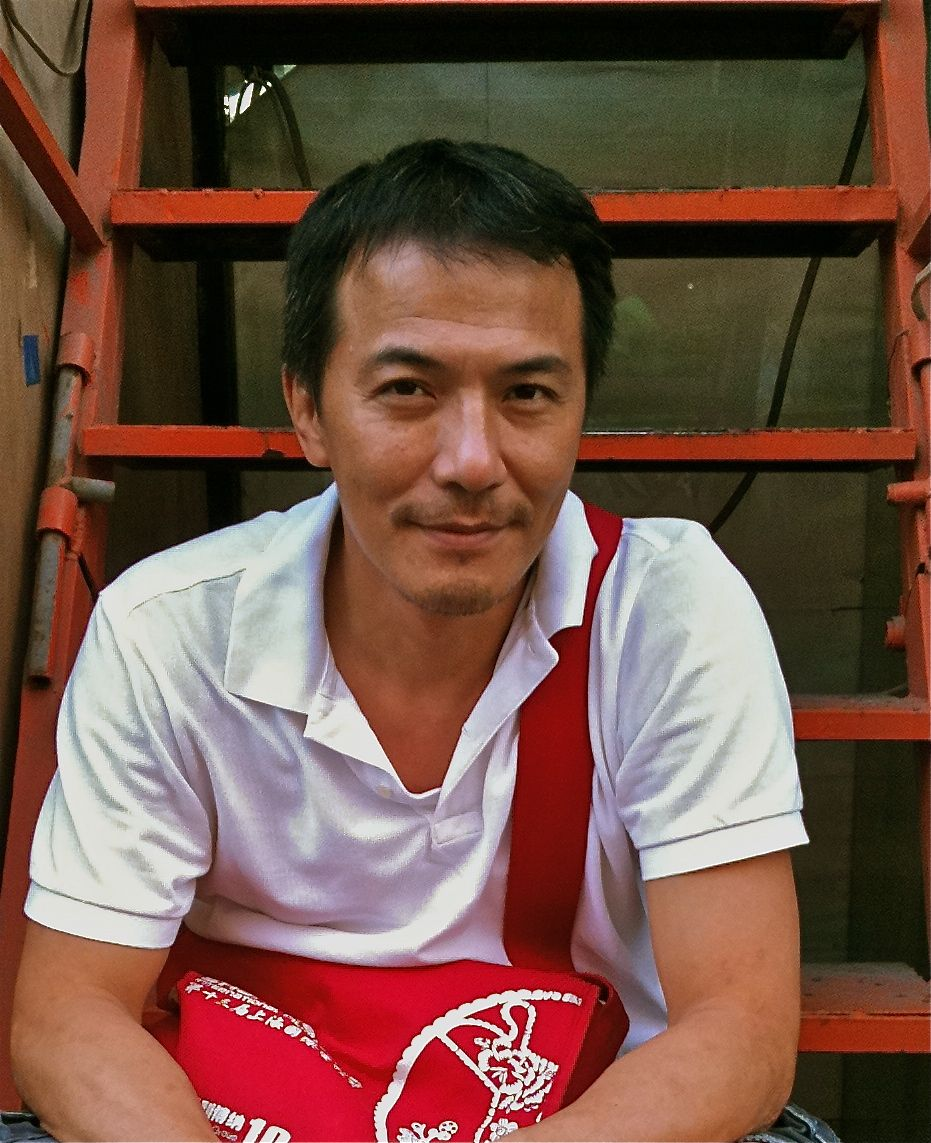
Leon Dai won for Cannot Live Without You (2009).

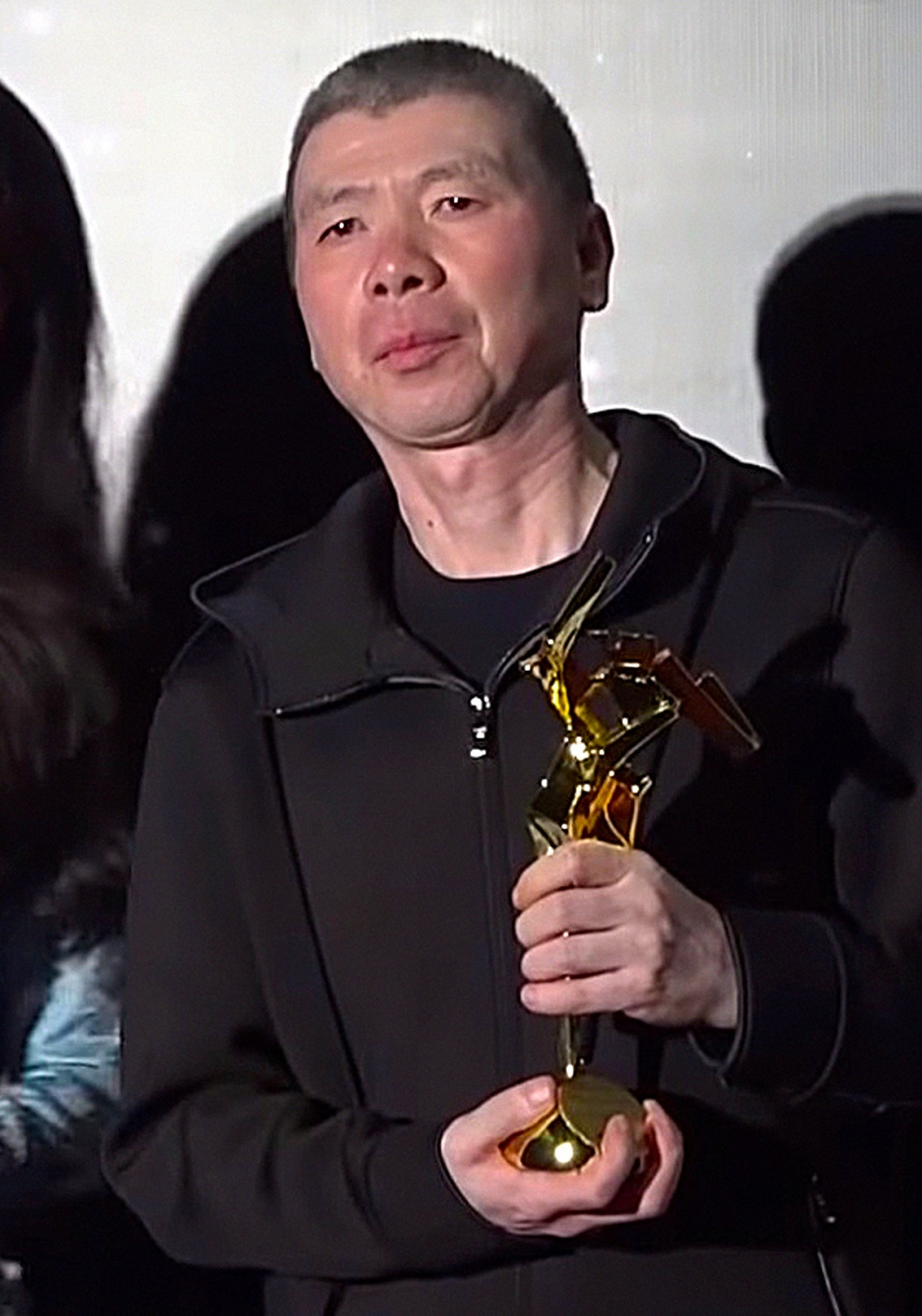
Feng Xiaogang won for I Am Not Madame Bovary (2016).

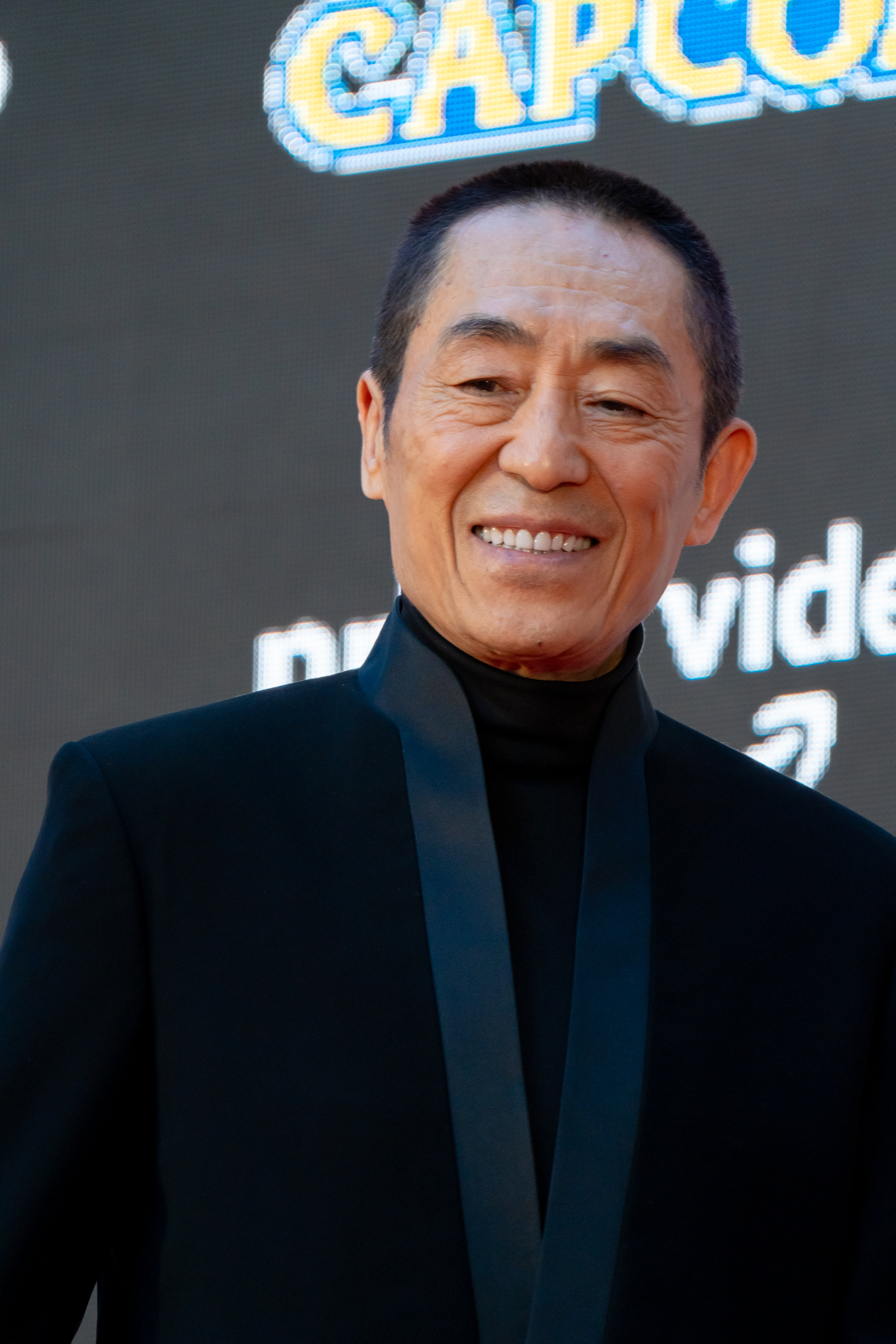
Zhang Yimou won for Shadow (2018).

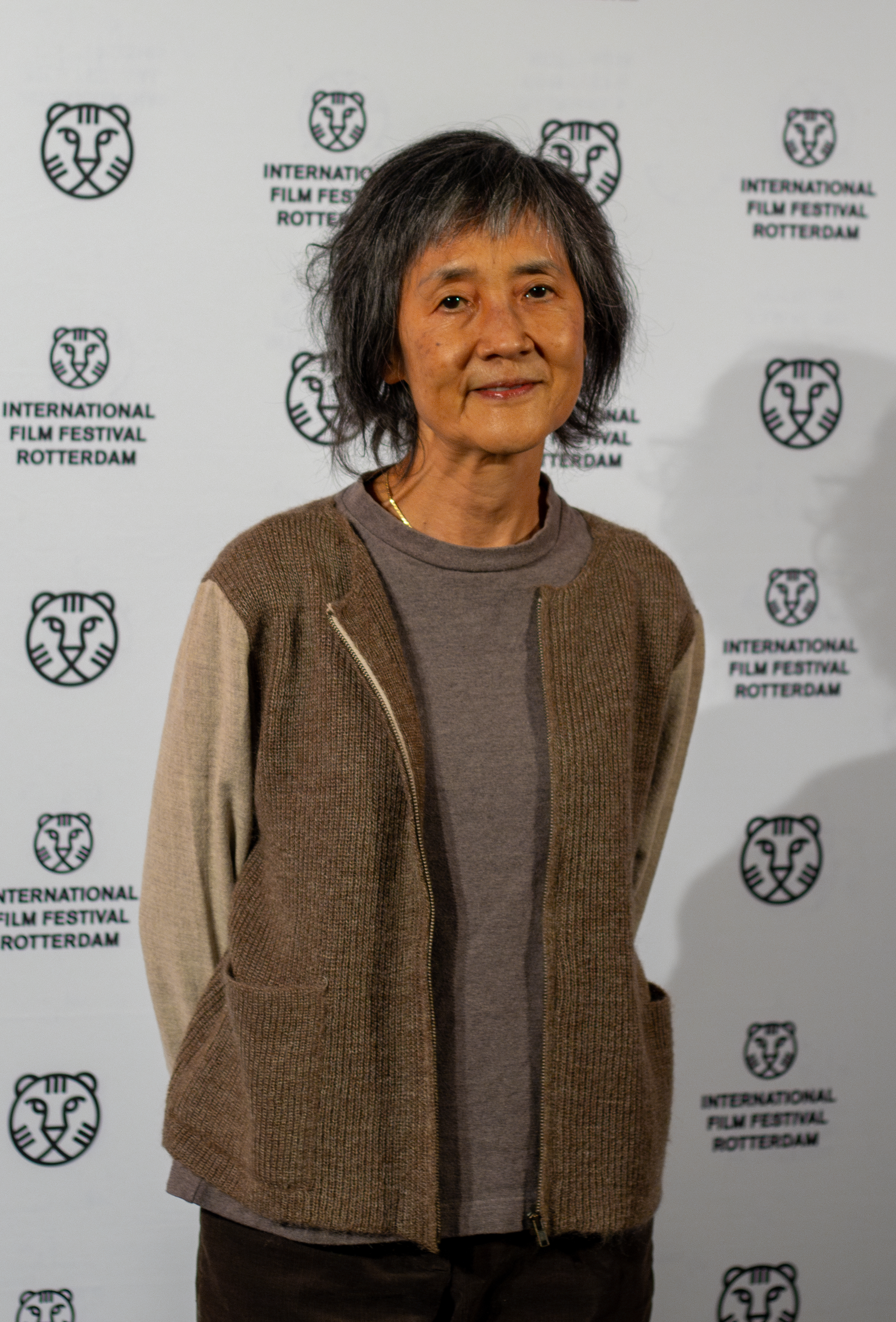
Clara Law won for Drifting Petals (2021).

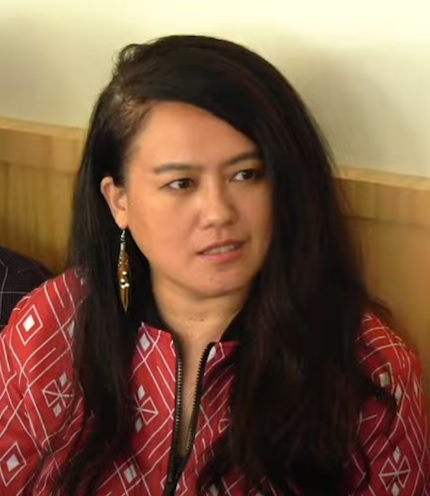
Laha Mebow won for Gaga (2022).

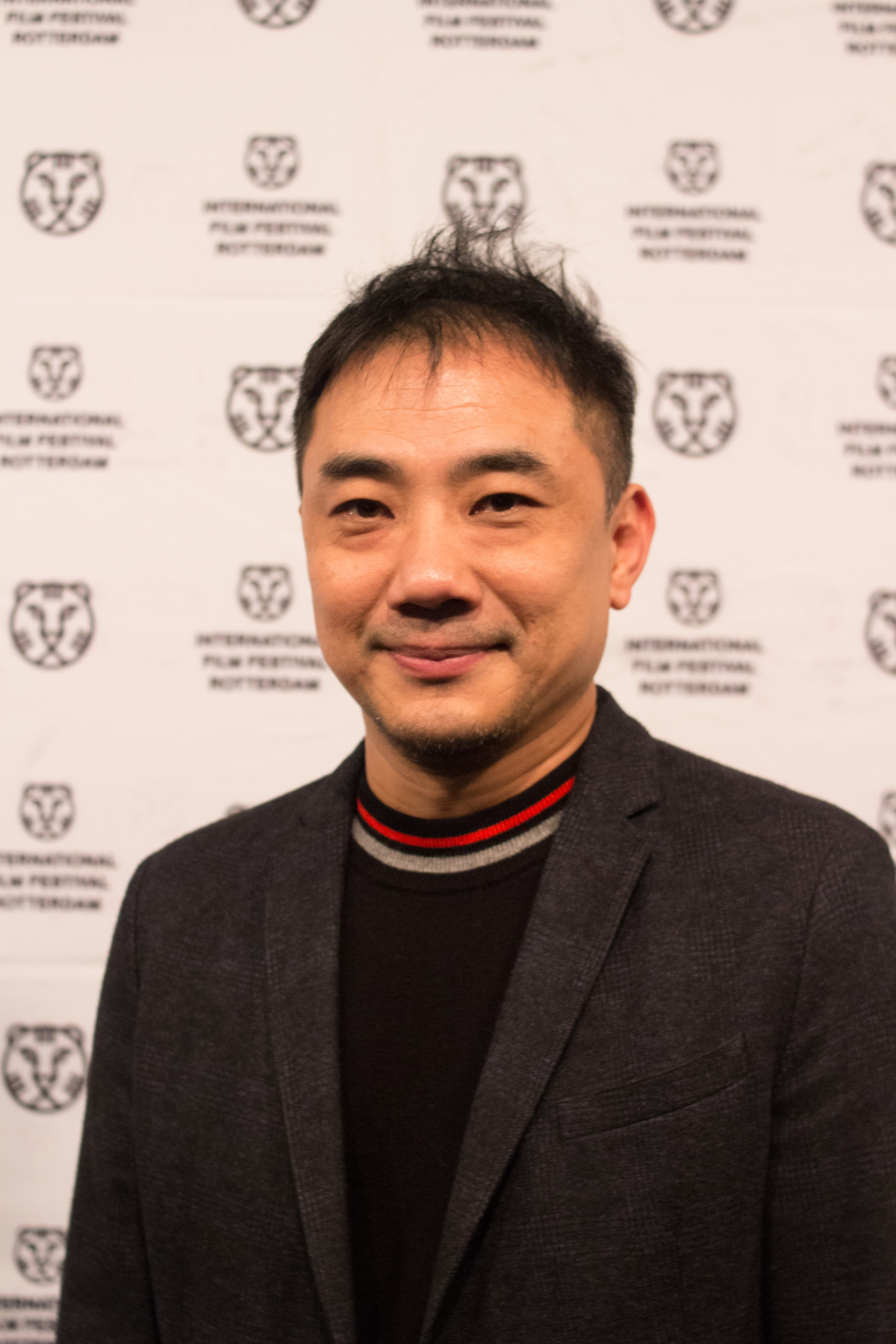
Hsiao Ya-chuan won for Old Fox (2023).

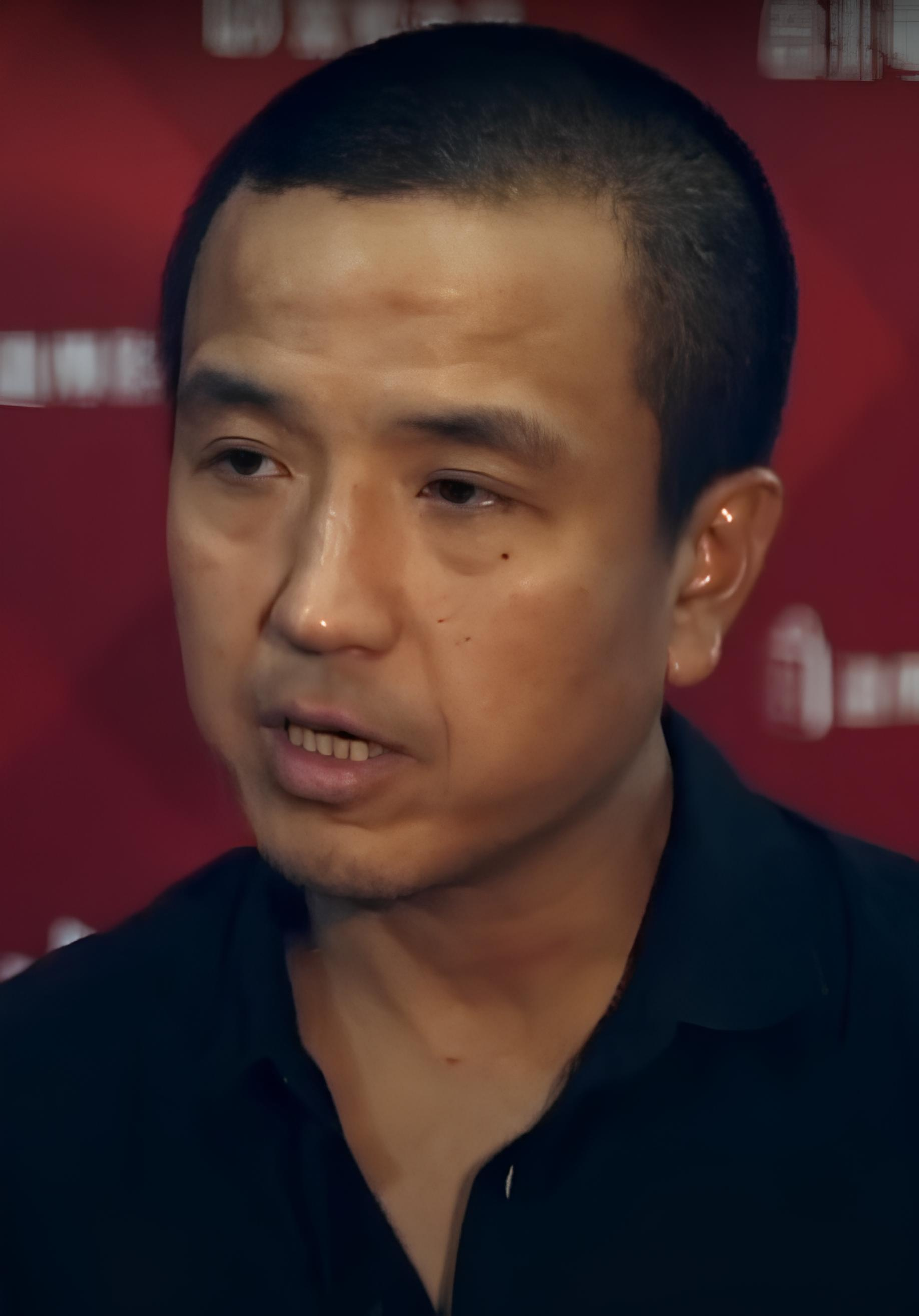
Lou Ye won for An Unfinished Film (2024).

indicates the winner

=== 1962–1979 ===
Year	Director(s)	Film	Original title
1962 (1st)	Doe Ching	Les Belles	千嬌百媚
1963 (2nd)	Li Han-hsiang	The Love Eterne	梁山伯與祝英台
1965 (3rd)	Li Hsing	Beautiful Duckling	養鴨人家
1966 (4th)	Li Han-hsiang	Hsi Shih: Beauty of Beauties	西施
1967 (5th)	Lee Chia	Orchids and My Love	我女若蘭
1968 (6th)	Pai Ching-jui	Lonely Seventeen	寂寞的十七歲
1969 (7th)	Pai Ching-jui	The Bride and I	新娘與我
1970 (8th)	Chang Tseng-chai	From the Highway	路客與刀客
1971 (9th)	Ting Shan-hsi	The Ammunition Hunter	落鷹峽
1972 (10th)	Li Hsing	Execution in Autumn	秋決
1973 (11th)	Cheng Kang	The 14 Amazons	十四女英豪
1975 (12th)	Liu Yi	Long Way from Home	長情萬縷
1976 (13th)	Chang Pei-cheng	The Venturer	狼牙口
1977 (14th)	Chang Tseng-chai	Heroes in the Eastern Sky	筧橋英烈傳
1978 (15th)	Li Hsing	He Never Gives Up	汪洋中的一條船
1978 (15th)	Chen Yao-chi	The Diary of Di Di	蒂蒂日記
1978 (15th)	Michael Hui	The Contract	賣身契
1979 (16th)	King Hu	Legend of the Mountain	山中傳奇
1979 (16th)	Li Hsing	The Story of a Small Town	小城故事
1979 (16th)	Tu Chung-hsun	A Special Smile	歡顏

=== 1980s ===
Year	Director(s)	Film	Original title
1980 (17th)	Wang Chu-chin	The Legend of the Six Dynasty	六朝怪談
1980 (17th)	Ann Hui	The Secret	瘋劫
1980 (17th)	Ting Shan-hsi	Magnificent 72	碧血黃花
1981 (18th)	Tsui Hark	All the Wrong Clues for the Right Solution	夜來香
1981 (18th)	Lin Jing-jie	Tong Ban Tong Xue	同班同學
1981 (18th)	Patrick Tam	Love Massacre	愛殺
1982 (19th)	Alex Cheung	Man on the Brink	邊緣人
1982 (19th)	Hou Hsiao-hsien	The Green, Green Grass of Home	在那河畔青草青
1982 (19th)	Peter Yung	Life After Life	再生人
1983 (20th)	Chen Kun-hou	Growing Up	小畢的故事
1983 (20th)	Choi Kai-kwong	Hong Kong, Hong Kong	男與女
1983 (20th)	Edward Yang	That Day, on the Beach	海灘的一天
1984 (21st)	Johnny Mak	Long Arm of the Law	省港旗兵
1984 (21st)	Chang Yi	Jade Love	玉卿嫂
1984 (21st)	Hou Hsiao-hsien	The Boys from Fengkuei	風櫃來的人
1985 (22nd)	Chang Yi	Kuei-Mei, a Woman	我這樣過了一生
1985 (22nd)	Chen Kun-hou	His Matrimony	結婚
1985 (22nd)	Hou Hsiao-hsien	The Time to Live and the Time to Die	童年往事
1986 (23rd)	John Woo	A Better Tomorrow	英雄本色
1986 (23rd)	Sylvia Chang	Passion	最愛
1986 (23rd)	Li Hsing	The Heroic Pioneers	唐山過台灣
1987 (24th)	Wang Toon	Strawman	稻草人
1987 (24th)	Jackie Chan	Project A Part II	A計劃續集
1987 (24th)	Mabel Cheung	An Autumn's Tale	流氓大亨
1988 (25th)	Alex Law	Painted Faces	七小福
1988 (25th)	Ann Hui	Starry is the Night	今夜星光燦爛
1988 (25th)	Wong Kar-wai	As Tears Go By	熱血男兒
1989 (26th)	Hou Hsiao-hsien	A City of Sadness	悲情城市
1989 (26th)	Stanley Kwan	Full Moon in New York	三個女人的故事
1989 (26th)	Yang Li-kuo	The Dull-Ice Flower	魯冰花

=== 1990s ===
Year	Director(s)	Film	Original title
1990 (27th)	Yim Ho	Red Dust	滾滾紅塵
1990 (27th)	Clara Law	Farewell, China	愛在他鄉的季節
1990 (27th)	Yeh Hung-wei	The Story of a Gangster	刀瘟
1991 (28th)	Wong Kar-wai	Days of Being Wild	阿飛正傳
1991 (28th)	Stanley Kwan	Centre Stage	阮玲玉
1991 (28th)	Ang Lee	Pushing Hands	推手
1991 (28th)	Edward Yang	A Brighter Summer Day	牯嶺街少年殺人事件
1992 (29th)	Wang Toon	Hill of No Return	無言的山丘
1992 (29th)	Evans Chan	To Liv(e)	浮世戀曲
1992 (29th)	Chou Tan	The Noblest Way to Die	黃金稻田
1992 (29th)	Tsai Ming-liang	Rebels of the Neon God	青少年哪吒
1993 (30th)	Ang Lee	The Wedding Banquet	喜宴
1993 (30th)	Clara Law	Autumn Moon	秋月
1993 (30th)	Jacob Cheung	Cageman	籠民
1993 (30th)	Derek Yee	C'est la vie, mon chéri	新不了情
1994 (31st)	Tsai Ming-liang	Vive L'Amour	愛情萬歲
1994 (31st)	Stanley Kwan	Red Rose, White Rose	紅玫瑰白玫瑰
1994 (31st)	Wong Kar-wai	Chungking Express	重慶森林
1994 (31st)	Edward Yang	A Confucian Confusion	獨立時代
1995 (32nd)	Hou Hsiao-hsien	Good Men, Good Women	好男好女
1995 (32nd)	Ann Hui	Summer Snow	女人四十
1995 (32nd)	Chen Yu-hsun	Tropical Fish	熱帶魚
1995 (32nd)	Wan Jen	Super Citizen Ko	超級大國民
1996 (33rd)	Jiang Wen	In the Heat of the Sun	阳光灿烂的日子
1996 (33rd)	Clara Law	Floating Life	浮生
1996 (33rd)	Wang Toon	Red Persimmon	紅柿子
1996 (33rd)	Derek Yee, Law Chi-leung	Viva Erotica	色情男女
1997 (34th)	Fruit Chan	Made in Hong Kong	香港製造
1997 (34th)	Wong Kar-wai	Happy Together	春光乍洩
1997 (34th)	Ho Ping	Wolves Cry Under the Moon	國道封閉
1997 (34th)	Clifton Ko	The Mad Phoenix	南海十三郎
1998 (35th)	Joan Chen	Xiu Xiu: The Sent Down Girl	天浴
1998 (35th)	Hou Hsiao-hsien	Flowers of Shanghai	海上花
1998 (35th)	Chen Kuo-fu	The Personals	徵婚啟事
1998 (35th)	Mabel Cheung	City of Glass	玻璃之城
1999 (36th)	Ann Hui	Ordinary Heroes	千言萬語
1999 (36th)	Teddy Chan	Purple Storm	紫雨風暴
1999 (36th)	Ringo Lam	Victim	目露兇光
1999 (36th)	Chang Tso-chi	Darkness and Light	黑暗之光

=== 2000s ===
Year	Director(s)	Film	Original title
2000 (37th)	Johnnie To	The Mission	鎗火
2000 (37th)	Ang Lee	Crouching Tiger, Hidden Dragon	臥虎藏龍
2000 (37th)	Wong Kar-wai	In the Mood for Love	花樣年華
2000 (37th)	Ann Hu	Shadow Magic	西洋镜
2001 (38th)	Stanley Kwan	Lan Yu	藍宇
2001 (38th)	Fruit Chan	Durian Durian	榴槤飄飄
2001 (38th)	Tsai Ming-liang	What Time Is It There?	你那邊幾點
2001 (38th)	Wang Xiaoshuai	Beijing Bicycle	十七岁的单车
2002 (39th)	Fruit Chan	Hollywood Hong Kong	香港有個荷里活
2002 (39th)	Peter Chan	Three: Going Home	三更之回家
2002 (39th)	Lam Wah-tsuen	The Runaway Pistol	走火槍
2002 (39th)	Chang Tso-chi	The Best of Times	美麗時光
2003 (40th)	Andrew Lau, Alan Mak	Infernal Affairs	無間道
2003 (40th)	Pang Ho-cheung	Men Suddenly in Black	大丈夫
2003 (40th)	Johnnie To	PTU	
2003 (40th)	Tsai Ming-liang	Goodbye, Dragon Inn	不散
2004 (41st)	Johnnie To	Breaking News	大事件
2004 (41st)	Fruit Chan	Dumplings	餃子
2004 (41st)	Derek Yee	One Nite in Mongkok	旺角黑夜
2004 (41st)	Lu Chuan	Mountain Patrol: Kekexili	可可西里
2005 (42nd)	Stephen Chow	Kung Fu Hustle	功夫
2005 (42nd)	Hou Hsiao-hsien	Three Times	最好的時光
2005 (42nd)	Johnnie To	Election	黑社會
2005 (42nd)	Tsai Ming-liang	The Wayward Cloud	天邊一朵雲
2006 (43rd)	Peter Chan	Perhaps Love	如果·愛
2006 (43rd)	Johnnie To	Exiled	放‧逐
2006 (43rd)	Su Chao-pin	Silk	詭絲
2006 (43rd)	Ning Hao	Crazy Stone	疯狂的石头
2007 (44th)	Ang Lee	Lust, Caution	色，戒
2007 (44th)	Derek Yee	Protégé	門徒
2007 (44th)	Yau Nai-hoi	Eye in the Sky	跟蹤
2007 (44th)	Jiang Wen	The Sun Also Rises	太阳照常升起
2008 (45th)	Peter Chan	The Warlords	投名狀
2008 (45th)	Sylvia Chang	Run Papa Run	一個好爸爸
2008 (45th)	Pang Ho-cheung	Trivial Matters	破事儿
2008 (45th)	Wei Te-sheng	Cape No. 7	海角七號
2009 (46th)	Leon Dai	Cannot Live Without You	不能没有你
2009 (46th)	Clara Law	Like a Dream	如夢
2009 (46th)	Tsai Ming-liang	Face	臉
2009 (46th)	Guan Hu	Cow	斗牛

=== 2010s ===
Year	Director(s)	Film	Original title
2010 (47th)	Chung Mong-hong	The Fourth Portrait	第四張畫
2010 (47th)	Teddy Chan	Bodyguards and Assassins	十月圍城
2010 (47th)	Liu Jie	Judge	透析
2010 (47th)	Chang Tso-chi	When Love Comes	當愛來的時候
2011 (48th)	Ann Hui	A Simple Life	桃姐
2011 (48th)	Jiang Wen	Let the Bullets Fly	让子弹飞
2011 (48th)	Wei Te-sheng	Warriors of the Rainbow: Seediq Bale	賽德克·巴萊
2011 (48th)	Zhang Meng	The Piano in a Factory	钢的琴
2012 (49th)	Johnnie To	Life Without Principle	奪命金
2012 (49th)	Lou Ye	Mystery	浮城謎事
2012 (49th)	Yang Ya-che	Girlfriend, Boyfriend	女朋友。男朋友
2012 (49th)	Gao Qunshu	Beijing Blues	神探亨特张
2012 (49th)	Doze Niu	Love	愛
2013 (50th)	Tsai Ming-liang	Stray Dogs	郊遊
2013 (50th)	Jia Zhangke	A Touch of Sin	天注定
2013 (50th)	Wong Kar-wai	The Grandmaster	一代宗师
2013 (50th)	Johnnie To	Drug War	毒戰
2013 (50th)	Chung Mong-hong	Soul	失魂
2014 (51st)	Ann Hui	The Golden Era	黄金时代
2014 (51st)	Lou Ye	Blind Massage	推拿
2014 (51st)	Diao Yinan	Black Coal, Thin Ice	白日焰火
2014 (51st)	Midi Z	Ice Poison	冰毒
2014 (51st)	Wang Xiaoshuai	Red Amnesia	闯入者
2015 (52nd)	Hou Hsiao-hsien	The Assassin	刺客聶隱娘
2015 (52nd)	Jia Zhangke	Mountains May Depart	山河故人
2015 (52nd)	Pema Tseden	Tharlo	塔洛
2015 (52nd)	Tsui Hark	The Taking of Tiger Mountain	智取威虎山
2015 (52nd)	Chang Tso-chi	Thanatos, Drunk	醉.生夢死
2016 (53rd)	Feng Xiaogang	I Am Not Madame Bovary	我不是潘金莲
2016 (53rd)	Derek Tsang	Soul Mate	七月与安生
2016 (53rd)	Johnnie To	Three	三人行
2016 (53rd)	Chung Mong-hong	Godspeed	一路順風
2016 (53rd)	Midi Z	The Road to Mandalay	再見瓦城
2017 (54th)	Vivian Qu	Angels Wear White	嘉年华
2017 (54th)	Geng Jun	Free and Easy	轻松+愉快
2017 (54th)	Sylvia Chang	Love Education	相愛相親
2017 (54th)	Ann Hui	Our Time Will Come	明月幾時有
2017 (54th)	Yang Ya-che	The Bold, the Corrupt, and the Beautiful	血觀音
2018 (55th)	Zhang Yimou	Shadow	影
2018 (55th)	Lou Ye	A Rain Cloud in the Sky	风中有朵雨做的云
2018 (55th)	Bi Gan	Long Day's Journey into Night	地球最后的夜晚
2018 (55th)	Pema Tseden	Jinpa	撞死了一只羊
2018 (55th)	Jiang Wen	Hidden Man	邪不压正
2019 (56th)	Chung Mong-hong	A Sun	陽光普照
2019 (56th)	Anthony Chen	Wet Season	熱帶雨
2019 (56th)	Tom Lin Shu-yu	The Garden of Evening Mists	夕霧花園
2019 (56th)	Midi Z	Nina Wu	灼人秘密
2019 (56th)	Chang Tso-chi	Synapses	那個我最親愛的陌生人

=== 2020s ===
Year	Director(s)	Film	Original title	Ref.
2020 (57th)	Chen Yu-hsun	My Missing Valentine	消失的情人節	
2020 (57th)	Tsai Ming-liang	Days	日子	
2020 (57th)	Huang Hsin-yao	Classmates Minus	同學麥娜絲	
2020 (57th)	Cheng Yu-chieh	Dear Tenant	親愛的房客	
2020 (57th)	Fruit Chan	The Abortionist	墮胎師	
2021 (58th)	Clara Law	Drifting Petals	花果飄零	
2021 (58th)	Cheng Wei-hao	The Soul	緝魂	
2021 (58th)	Chung Mong-hong	The Falls	瀑布	
2021 (58th)	Jun Li	Drifting	濁水漂流	
2021 (58th)	Ho Wi-ding, Hu Chih-hsin	Terrorizers	青春弒戀	
2022 (59th)	Laha Mebow	Gaga	哈勇家	
2022 (59th)	Cheang Pou-soi	Limbo	智齒	
2022 (59th)	Kevin Ko	Incantation	咒	
2022 (59th)	Chang Tso-chi	Flotsam and Jetsam	夏日天空的那匹紅馬	
2022 (59th)	Chan Ching-lin	Coo-Coo 043	一家子兒咕咕叫	
2023 (60th)	Hsiao Ya-chuan	Old Fox	老狐狸	
2023 (60th)	Huang Ji, Ryuji Otsuka	Stonewalling	石門	
2023 (60th)	Cheng Wei-hao	Marry My Dead Body	關於我和鬼變成家人的那件事	
2023 (60th)	Chong Keat Aun	Snow in Midsummer	五月雪	
2023 (60th)	Wong Ching-po	The Pig, The Snake and The Pigeon	周處除三害	
2024 (61st)	Lou Ye	An Unfinished Film	一部未完成的電影	
2024 (61st)	Geng Jun	Bel Ami	漂亮朋友	
2024 (61st)	Yeo Siew Hua	Stranger Eyes	默視錄	
2024 (61st)	Ray Yeung	All Shall Be Well	從今以後	
2024 (61st)	John Hsu	Dead Talents Society	鬼才之道	
2025 (62nd)	Jun Li	Queerpanorama	眾生相	
2025 (62nd)	Chen Yu-hsun	A Foggy Tale	大濛	
2025 (62nd)	Tsao Shih-han	Before the Bright Day	南方時光	
2025 (62nd)	Lau Kek-huat	The Waves Will Carry Us	人生海海	
2025 (62nd)	Chong Keat Aun	Mother Bhumi	地母	

== See also ==
- Asian Film Award for Best Director
- Blue Dragon Film Award for Best Director
- Cannes Film Festival Award for Best Director
- Hong Kong Film Award for Best Director
- Japan Academy Film Prize for Director of the Year
- Silver Lion
