= 39th Golden Horse Awards =

Award ceremony for Chinese-language films of 2001 and 2002

- Promotional poster
- Date: November 16, 2002
- Site: Kaohsiung Cultural Center, Kaohsiung, Taiwan
- Hosted by: Kevin Tsai and Carol Cheng
- Preshow hosts: George Chang and Stacy Hsu
- Organized by: Taipei Golden Horse Film Festival Executive Committee

Highlights
- Best Feature Film: The Best of Times
- Best Director: Fruit Chan; Hollywood Hong Kong
- Best Actor: Leon Lai; Three - Going Home
- Best Actress: Angelica Lee; The Eye
- Most awards: Hollywood Hong Kong (3); July Rhapsody (3)
- Most nominations: Hollywood Hong Kong (14)

Television in Taiwan
- Channel: TVBS-G
- Ratings: 2.11% (average)

The 39th Golden Horse Awards (Mandarin:第39屆金馬獎) took place on November 16, 2002 at the Kaohsiung Cultural Center in Kaohsiung, Taiwan.

== Winners and nominees ==
Winners are listed first and highlighted in boldface.

**Best Feature Film**: **The Best of Times**; Hollywood Hong Kong; July Rhapsody; Three: Going Home; The Runaway Pistol	**Best Short Film**: **Summers**; The Skywalk Is Gone; Voice of Waves
**Best Documentary**: **Spring: The Story of Hsu Chin-yu**; **How High Is the Mountain**	**Best Animation**: **My Life as McDull**
**Best Director**: **Fruit Chan — Hollywood Hong Kong**; Peter Chan — Three: Going Home; Lam Wah-chuen — The Runaway Pistol; Chang Tso-chi — The Best of Times	**Best Leading Actor**: **Leon Lai — Three: Going Home**; Wing Fan — The Best of Times; Glen Chin — Hollywood Hong Kong; Leslie Cheung — Inner Senses
**Best Leading Actress**: **Angelica Lee — The Eye**; Anita Mui — July Rhapsody; Sammi Cheng — My Left Eye Sees Ghosts; Zhou Xun — Hollywood Hong Kong	**Best Supporting Actor**: **Anthony Wong — Princess D**; Kao Meng-chieh — The Best of Times; Duan Chun-hao — Fancy 25; David Morse — Double Vision
**Best Supporting Actress**: **Karena Lam — July Rhapsody**; Hu Wei-men — Hollywood Hong Kong; Yang Kuei-mei — Crusoe's Robinson; Zhao Wei — Chinese Odyssey 2002	**Best New Performer**: **Karena Lam — July Rhapsody**; Kao Meng-chieh — The Best of Times; Wong You-nam — Hollywood Hong Kong; Erica Lam — Let's Love Hong Kong
**Audience Choice Award**: **The Best of Times**	**Outstanding Taiwanese Film of the Year**: **The Best of Times**; **Somewhere Over the Dreamland**
**Outstanding Taiwanese Filmmaker of the Year**: **Liao Ching-sung**	**Lifetime Achievement Award**: **Sihung Lung**
