= Flotsam and Jetsam (film) =

2022 Taiwanese film by Chang Tso-chi

- Promotional poster
- Traditional Chinese: 夏日天空的那匹紅馬
- Simplified Chinese: 夏日天空的那匹红马
- Literal meaning: "Red Horse in the Summer Sky"
- Hanyu Pinyin: Xià rì tiān kōng dì nà pǐ hóng mǎ
- Directed by: Chang Tso-chi
- Written by: Chang Tso-chi
- Produced by: Kao Wen-hung; Vincent Chen
- Starring: Fox Lee; Tung Liang-yu
- Edited by: Chang Tso-chi
- Production company: Simple View Production
- Release date: November 6, 2022 (Taipei Golden Horse)
- Running time: 98 minutes
- Country: Taiwan
- Languages: Mandarin; Taiwanese

Flotsam and Jetsam (Chinese: 夏日天空的那匹紅馬) is a 2022 Taiwanese drama film written and directed by Chang Tso-chi.

== Premise ==
A runaway girl, Hui-zhen, arrives at a seaside village to find her biological father she had never met before. There, she meets the mysterious teenager Liang and his family, and begins a journey of love and atonement.

== Cast ==
- Chen Ming as Chen You-ming
- Fox Lee as Hui-zhen
- Tung Liang-yu as Liang
- Chen Ying-ru
- Wu Wei-han
- Chang Che-kuei
- Chung Shang-ting

== Reception ==
The film received attention for its cinematography and emotional soundtrack.

== Awards and nominations ==
Awards	Category	Recipient	Result	Ref.
59th Golden Horse Awards	Best Director	Chang Tso-chi	Nominated	
