= Darkness and Light (film) =

- Film poster
- Directed by: Chang Tso-chi
- Written by: Chang Tso-chi
- Produced by: Chen Hsi-Sheng
- Starring: Lee Kang-i; Wing Fan
- Cinematography: Chang Chan
- Edited by: Chen Po-Wen
- Music by: Thio Hugo-Panduputra
- Production company: Chang Tso-chi Film Studio
- Release dates: 16 May 1999 (Cannes Film Festival); 19 February 2000 (Taiwan)
- Running time: 104 minutes
- Country: Taiwan
- Languages: Taiwanese; Mandarin

Darkness and Light (Chinese: 黑暗之光; pinyin: Hei An Zhi Guang) is a 1999 Taiwanese narrative film directed by Chang Tso-chi. It was screened as part of the Directors' Fortnight section of the 52nd Cannes Film Festival, and won the Grand Prix at the 12th Tokyo International Film Festival. Darkness and Light was also nominated for seven different categories at the 36th Taipei Golden Horse Film Awards, winning the Grand Jury Award, the Audience Choice Award, the Best Original Screenplay Award, and the Best Film Editing Award. In 2010, it was ranked 43rd on a list of the Top 100 Chinese-Language Films by the Golden Horse Film Festival and Awards Committee.

== Plot ==
Darkness and Light unfolds in a fishing town in Keelung, a port city near Taipei. Kang-yi, a seventeen-year-old student in Taipei returns home in Keelung for summer vacation. Growing up with an absent mother, Kang-yi takes care of her family: her intellectually disabled younger brother, her blind father, and her grandparents. All of them live together in an apartment complex in Keelung and work as masseurs at the massage parlor run by Kang-yi’s father out of their apartment home after a car accident blinds him and kills Kang-yi’s mother when Kang-yi was little. Kang-yi's family depends on her to connect with the outside worlds as she helps guide them at work and through everyday tasks. Kang-yi meets Ah Ping, a young gangster from a mainlander family who just moves into her apartment building. Kang-yi slowly develops a crush on Ah Ping. As the two of them start hanging out around the neighborhood and eventually make a trip to Taipei together, they become embroiled in a gangland fight that unfortunately kills Ah Ping. Meanwhile, Kang-yi’s father falls ill and eventually passes away after his trip to Taipei with Kang-yi. Devastated by the tragedy of losing both her father and Ah Ping, Kang-yi sees her father and Ah Ping's magical return in the film's dream-like ending. Darkness and Light ends with a surreal sequence following a firework showering from Kang-yi’s window, during which Kang-yi’s father and Ah Ping, the two characters who have died previously, return to Kang-yi’s home for a meal and are warmly greeted by everyone.

== Cast ==
- Lee Kang-i as Kang-yi – A seventeen-year-old student in Taipei, who returns to her home in Keelung to take care of her blind father, intellectually disabled younger brother, and grandfather during summer vacation. She falls in love with Ah Ping.
- Wing Fan as Ah Ping – A young gangster who just moves to Kang-yi’s apartment building and is killed in a gangster dispute.
- Tsai Ming-Shiou as Kang-yi's father – Blinded by a car accident, Kang-yi’s father runs a massage parlor out of their apartment home with Kang-yi’s brother and grandfather and three other blind masseurs.
- Hsieh Bau-huei as Kang-yi's mother – Killed by the same car accident that blinds Kang-yi’s father when Kang-yi was still very young at age.
- He Huang-ji as Ah Ji – Kang-yi's intellectually disabled younger brother.

== Production ==
Since his early productions, Chang Tso-chi has been known for his style of working with people who share similar lived experiences with the characters portrayed in his films. The same was true of Darkness and Light, as all the blind characters Chang Tso-chi cast in the film were discovered by him on the street. To prepare the amateur actors for their roles, Tso-chi asked the entire cast to spend extended time together, so that they could bond and build a sense of intimacy with one another. "I usually rent a house and have all the actors move in," Chang explained to Taiwan Review journalist, Kelly Her. "They live, cook, eat, and even sleep under the same roof, so that they can get to know each other quickly. That makes the shooting go smoothly and their performances more natural." Chang further noted in the same interview that, while shooting the film, he relied on portable lighting to give his actors maximum freedom of movement.

== Reception ==
CineAction film critic, Shelly Kraicer, praised the film as "the most demanding and the most rewarding Chinese language film at the 1999 Toronto International Film Festival." She also stated, "Like fellow Taiwanese director Hou Hsiao-hsien, Chang [Tso-chi] makes films that impose a speed (slow) and a rhythm (subtle, insistent, measured) on their viewers."

Variety film critic, David Stratton, described Darkness and Light as "combin[ing] realism with mysticism to baffling effect. A genuine oddity, pic has distinctive qualities and is a possible traveler on the summer fest circuit." He also noted that the film’s "fantastic finale is on a completely different level from the downbeat realism of the rest of the film and its generally naturalistic thesping. It certainly makes for an unusual resolution to an otherwise standard study of working class types and gangster substrata."

Taiwan Review film critic, Kelly Her, praised, "Movie director Chang Tso-chi, one of the few survivors of a film industry battered by international competition, [who] is winning kudos from critics for his tales of the triumph of the little man struggling against long odds."

In 2010, Darkness and Light was ranked 43rd on a list of the Top 100 Chinese-Language Films by the Golden Horse Film Festival and Awards Committee.

== Soundtrack ==
Taiwanese singer and songwriter, Summer Lei (雷光夏), wrote and sang the film's theme song, "Forgiveness". In 2006, Summer Lei phoned Tso-chi to inquire about the possibility of using the title of Darkness and Light for her new album. To Lei's surprise, Tso-chi agreed without any hesitation. He even told Summer that she could use any of his film titles for her albums.

== Anecdotes ==
Tso-chi attended the 59th Venice Film Festival in September 2002 for the premiere of his follow-up film, The Best of Times. While fidgeting under the glare of television cameras and looking slightly uneasy at the press conference, he was asked about his experience debuting Darkness and Light and The Best of Times at various festivals. Tso-chi commented, "Writing a script is delightful, and so is shooting a film ... But wearing a suit and tie is miserable."

== Awards and nominations ==
=== Festival premieres ===
- Cannes Film Festival: Directors' Fortnight section of the 52nd edition
- Toronto International Film Festival
- Vancouver International Film Festival
- Viennale International Film Festival
- Filmfest Hamburg
- Festival des 3 Continents
- London Film Festival
- Tokyo International Film Festival
- Taipei Film Festival
- Golden Horse Film Festival and Awards

=== Awards ===
Award/Ceremony	Category	Name	Outcome
10th Tokyo International Film Festival	Tokyo Grand Prix	Darkness and Light	Won
10th Tokyo International Film Festival	Asian Film Award	Chang Tso-chi	Won
10th Tokyo International Film Festival	Gold Award	Chang Tso-chi	Won
2nd Taipei Film Award	Best Film	Darkness and Light	Won
2nd Taipei Film Award	The Most Promising Talent	Lee Kang-i	Won
2nd Taipei Film Award	Special Jury Prize	Darkness and Light Amateur Actors	Won
36th Golden Horse Film Awards	Best Feature Film	Darkness and Light	Nominated
36th Golden Horse Film Awards	Best Director	Chang Tso-chi	Nominated
36th Golden Horse Film Awards	Best Leading Actress	Lee Kang-i	Nominated
36th Golden Horse Film Awards	Best Original Screenplay	Chang Tso-chi	Won
36th Golden Horse Film Awards	Best Film Editing	Chang Tso-chi	Won
36th Golden Horse Film Awards	Best Sound Effects	Thio Hugo-Panduputra	Nominated
36th Golden Horse Film Awards	Jury Award	Darkness and Light	Won
Singapore International Film Festival	Best Picture	Darkness and Light	Won
Singapore International Film Festival	Jury Award	Darkness and Light	Won
