= Queerpanorama =

- Film poster
- Mandarin: 眾生相
- Directed by: Jun Li
- Written by: Jun Li
- Produced by: Jun Li; Zenni Corbin; Yue Huang
- Starring: Jayden Cheung; Erfan Shekarriz; Sebastian Mahito Soukup; Arm Anatphikorn; Zenni Corbin; Wang Ko Yuan; Philip Smith
- Cinematography: Yuk Fai Ho
- Edited by: Horse Stone
- Production companies: Good Sin Production; La Fonte
- Distributed by: Dark Star Pictures (United States)
- Release dates: February 15, 2025 (Berlinale); November 26, 2026 (Hong Kong)
- Running time: 87 minutes
- Countries: United States; Hong Kong; China
- Languages: English; Mandarin

Queerpanorama (Mandarin: 眾生相) is a 2025 drama film written and directed by Jun Li. The film premiered at the 75th Berlin International Film Festival on February 15, 2025.

== Premise ==
A gay man impersonates men he has had sex with and brings this new persona with him to his next hook-up, only by pretending to be someone else.

== Cast ==
- Jayden Cheung as I
- Erfan Shekarriz as Erfan
- Sebastian Mahito Soukup as Stefan
- Arm Anatphikorn as Dan
- Zenni Corbin as Matthew
- Wang Ko Yuan as Charlie
- Philip Smith as Phil

== Production ==
In January 2025, the internationally co-produced film was selected for the Panorama section of the Berlin International Film Festival, for a LGBTQ+ themed drama film, written and directed by Jun Li.

== Release ==
Queepanorama premiered at the 75th Berlin International Film Festival on February 15, 2025. In March 2025, Dark Star Pictures acquired the U.S. distribution rights.
