= Jun Li (director) =

Hong Kong film filmmaker and critic

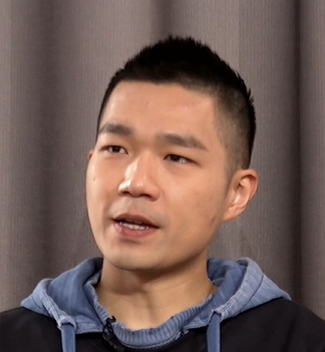
- Li in February 2025
- Born: August 3, 1991 (age 35); London, United Kingdom
- Education: Chinese University of Hong Kong (BSocSc); University of Cambridge (MPhil)
- Occupations: Filmmaker; Playwright; Film critic
- Awards: Golden Horse Award for Best Adapted Screenplay (2021) Golden Horse Award for Best Director (2025) Hong Kong Drama Award for Best Script (2026)

Jun Li (Chinese: 李駿碩; born 3 August 1991) is a Hong Kong filmmaker and critic. Li made his feature film debut with Tracey in 2018. He won the Golden Horse Award for Best Adapted Screenplay at the 58th Golden Horse Awards in November 2021 for his second film Drifting. In November 2025, he won the Golden Horse Award for Best Director for his third film Queerpanorama. He is also a member of the Hong Kong Film Critics Society.

== Early life ==
Li was born in London and grew up in Hong Kong. He studied journalism and communications at Chinese University of Hong Kong and worked as a television reporter. He later obtained his Master of Philosophy in gender studies at the University of Cambridge. After completing his studies, he returned to Hong Kong and joined the University of Hong Kong as a research assistant.

== Career ==
Li began making short films as a research assistant at the University of Hong Kong. He and his short film Liu Yang He (2017) won the Fresh Wave Award and Best Director at the 11th Fresh Wave International Short Film Festival.

Li made his feature film debut with Tracey in 2018 about a married trans woman transitioning in her 50s. Li was brought on later in pre-production, after another director quit the project and actors Philip Keung and River Huang have been cast. He was nominated at the 38th Hong Kong Film Awards for Best Screenplay (alongside Shu Kei and Erica Li) and Best New Director. Li has not received a Hong Kong government subsidy (such as the First Feature Film Initiative) for all his directorial feature productions. He cited the lack of perceived commercial viability of LGBT films as a barrier to winning such initiatives.

His second film Drifting (2021) is about homelessness and addiction in Sham Shui Po, Kowloon. It competed at the International Film Festival Rotterdam Big Screen Competition. The film was nominated for 12 awards at the 58th Golden Horse Awards, making it the most nominated film from that year. He was himself nominated Best Director, Best Film Editing and Best Adapted Screenplay, winning the latter.

Li's third film Queerpanorama (2025) features a gay protagonist and is shot in black and white. He won Best Director at the 62nd Golden Horse Awards. The film was also nominated for a Golden Horse Award for Best Narrative Feature. According to the judging panel, A Foggy Tale narrowly beat Queerpanorama in an 8–7 vote. He openly criticised Israel for its war crimes in Gaza during his film premiere at the 2025 Berlinale. The incident was widely cited as an example of German censorship against pro-palestinian speech in the next edition.

His play In a Perfect World tells a multi-generational story of a family living in an apartment in Manhattan Chinatown throughout 3 different eras. It opened at the Hong Kong Cultural Centre in November 2025, for which Li won Best Script and Best Play with On and On Theatre Workshop at the 34th Hong Kong Drama Awards.

== Style and influences ==
Li cites Ken Loach, Spike Lee, Stanley Kwan, Hong Sang Soo, and Lou Ye as his influences.

== Personal life ==
Li is gay and his partner is an actor in two of his films.

== Filmography ==
=== Directing, Writing, Editing, Producing ===
Year	Title	Director	Screenwriter	Editor	Producer	Notes
2017	Liu Yang He	Yes	Yes	Yes	No	Short film
2018	My World	Yes	Yes	Yes	No	Short film
2018	Tracey	Yes	Yes	No	No	
2021	Drifting	Yes	Yes	Yes	No	
2021	Plain Sailing	No	No	No	Yes	Short film
2023	Fly Me to the Moon	No	No	No	Yes	
2025	Queerpanorama	Yes	Yes	No	Yes	Selected in Panorama section of the Berlinale.

=== Acting ===
Year	Title	Role	Notes
2018	I Miss You When I See You	Kevin	

== Awards and accolades ==
Year	Award	Category	Work	Result	Notes
2018	55th Golden Horse Awards	Best Live Action Short Film	My World	Nominated	
2019	24th IFVA Awards	Open Category	My World	Silver	
2019	38th Hong Kong Film Awards	Best Screenplay	Tracey	Nominated	alongside Shu Kei and Erica Li
2019	38th Hong Kong Film Awards	Best New Director	Tracey	Nominated	
2021	58th Golden Horse Awards	Golden Horse Award for Best Feature Film	Drifting	Nominated	
2021	58th Golden Horse Awards	Golden Horse Award for Best Director	Drifting	Nominated	
2021	58th Golden Horse Awards	Golden Horse Award for Best Adapted Screenplay	Drifting	Won	
2021	58th Golden Horse Awards	Golden Horse Award for Best Film Editing	Drifting	Nominated	alongside Heiward Mak
2022	27th IFVA Awards	Open Category	Plain Sailing	Won	director: Sasha Chuk
2025	62nd Golden Horse Awards	Golden Horse Award for Best Feature Film	Queerpanorama	Nominated	
2025	62nd Golden Horse Awards	Golden Horse Award for Best Director	Queerpanorama	Won	
2025	62nd Golden Horse Awards	Golden Horse Award for Best Original Screenplay	Queerpanorama	Nominated	
2026	34th Hong Kong Drama Awards	Best Production	In A Perfect World	Won	
2026	34th Hong Kong Drama Awards	Best Script	In A Perfect World	Won	

== See also ==
- Heiward Mak, Hong Kong director, co-editor on Drifting (2021)
