= Yue Huang =

Huang Yue (Chinese: 《黄月》) (born 1960, Beijing) is a Chinese artist.

Huang Yue is a central figure in the development of Chinese oil painting and is one of China's most renowned contemporary artists.

- Huang Yue was graduated from the Beijing Film Academy in 1982 with a fine arts major. From 1982 to 2010, about two hundred works of Huang Yue have been collected by domestic and foreign celebrities.

== Achievements and influences ==
Bird and flower oil painting became Huang Yue's signature genre and art focus in 2000. Before that, most depictions of bird and flower in both east and west paintings were mostly either still life or as background of portrait paintings, or drawn in their innate nature status. Huang Yue's paintings, however, are of essential difference. His paintings take the objects, aka birds and flowers as a symbol, to reflect mankind spirit, sensation, and ideology. Its concept and manifestation differs from traditional Chinese bird and flower drawings, but also differs with those of the western counterpart, creating a brand new visual conceptual oil painting genre—Huang Yue Bird and Flower Oil Painting.

== Art career ==
Huang Yue, created a new oil painting style and form – Huang Yue Bird-Flower Oil Painting in year 2000; was one of the Directors of the Committee of 2012 London Olympic Fine Arts Assembly; the Founder of Huang Yue Charitable Art Foundation; and the Ambassador of the Charity “Ministry of Civil Affairs China”. In year 2013, Los Angeles County issued Huang Yue with an honorable certification to recognize his contributions to art internationally. In the same year he was awarded “Outstanding Artistic Achievement Award” by American National Cultural and Arts Committee. In year 2014 he obtained the Gold Awards for World Famous Chinese in Los Angeles, USA. In year 2015, the Italian government issued an honorary certificate in recognition of his exceptional contribution to the cultural exchange between China and Italy.

On July 17, 2017, Huang Yue became the first Chinese artist honored with "A Knight of the Italian Republic". On January 13, 2017, the Italian Honorary Committee approved to honor Huang Yue with "A Knight of the Italian Republic" based on the invitation of the Ministry of Foreign Affairs of Italy and the No.87 Constitution of Republic of Italy; the President of Republic of Italy Sergio Mattarella awarded Huang Yue "A Knight of the Italian Republic".

In year 2017, the House of Representatives of the United States issued Huang Yue an honor certificate. In the very same year, Huang Yue was presented with the prestigious "Artistic Achievement award" by New York City Hall for his contributions to the Sino-USA culture communications as an artist. The paintings created by Huang Yue have been collected by national and international well-known places and families such as China National Academy of Painting, Diaoyutai State Guesthouse, the Chinese People Political Consultative Conference, Zhong Nan Hai, the Conference Center of National People's Congress, the Great Hall of the People, Jing Xi Hotel, the United Nations, the Italian Government, the National Irish Bank, the President Office of Irish, the Rothschild Family and the Rockefeller Family, and won many awards such as London Olympic Art Exhibition Gold Award in 2012 and the 20th International Art Exhibition Gold Award of Tokyo Metropolitan Museum of art in 2014.

In year 2017, Huang Yue's Flowers and Birds color ink paintings were collected by world leaders from 26 countries which are including Ban Ki-moon, the former Secretary-General of UN; Romano Prodi, the two sessions of Prime Minister of Italy, and the President of the European Commission; The Rt. Hon Jean Chretien, the former Prime Minister of Canada; HE Mr. Bertie Ahern, the Ireland's former Prime Minister; Simon Coveney, the Ireland's Vice Prime Minister; Christian Wilhelm Walter Wulff, the Germany's former President; Dominique de Villepin, the former French Prime Minister; HE Mr. Andrés Pastrana Arango, the former President of Colombia; Peter Roman, the former Romanian Prime Minister; Ricardo Lagos, the former President of Chile; Hamadi Jebali, the Tunisian former Prime Minister; Felipe Calderon, the former Mexican President; HE Mr. Olusegun, the former President of Nigeria; The Rt. Hon. James Bolger, the former Prime Minister of New Zealand; HE Dr. Abdel Salam Majali, the former Prime Minister of Jordan; HE Mr. Benjamin Mkapa, the former President of Tanzania; HE Mr. Peter Medgyessy, the former Prime Minister of Hungary; HE Mr. Viktor Yushchenko, the former President of Ukraine; HE Dr. Danilo Turk, the former President of Slovenia; HE Mr. Konstantinos Simitis, the former Prime Minister of Greece; HE Dr. George Vassiliou, the former President of Cyprus; HE Dr. Oscar Arias, the former President of Costa Rica; HE Tun Abdullah Ahmad Badawi, the former Malaysia Prime Minister; The Rt. Hon. Sir James Mitchell, the former Prime Minister of Saint Vincent and the Grenadines; the Grenadines former Prime Minister; The Rt. Hon. the Baroness Margaret Jay of Paddington, Leader of the House of Lords (UK); Mr. Bill F. Weld, the former Governor of Massachusetts; HE Mr. Tung Chee Hwa, the former Chief Executive of Hong Kong Special Administrative Region in China; HE Dr. Viktor Zubkov, the former Prime Minister of Russia.

In year 2014, the Rockefeller family held an exhibition for Huang Yue which exhibition is the first ever personal exhibition for an Asian artist in the past century. The Rockefeller family members from their four generations came and participated in the Huang Yue Painting Exhibition held at the Rockefeller State Park Preserve Art Gallery, New York, USA - "Huang Yue Nature's Divine Impressions"

- In January 2009, "Huang Yue Oil Painting Exhibition" was sponsored by Lai Shaoqi Funds which was hosted in China National Academy of Painting. In the same year, Huang Yue's oil painting Shao Fu was collected by China National Academy of Painting.
- In May 2010, his six works (including 'Jin Tang Bi Yu') was collected by DiaoYuTai State Guesthouse. Also in May 2010, his work "Dan Xia Cui Yu" was collected by Davidson of Glen Clova from Scotland.
- On September 3, 2010, China Collector of Penmanship and Painting Association sponsored his works like the first bird and flower oil painting exhibition, 'Huang Yue's Flower and Bird Oil Painting Exhibition', which were in China National Academy of Painting.
- In October 2010, four pieces of his work including "Yun Shang Xiang Han" was collected by the Rockefeller family.
- In November 2010, two of his works including 'Lian Rui You Xiang Chen' was collected by Zhong Nan Hai.
- In February 2011, his three works including 'Ping Zong Ban Sheng Yuan was collected by the Conference Center of National People's Congress.
- In July 2011, his work 'Bu Zhi Yi Zai Shui Zhong Yang was collected by China National Committee of the Chinese People's Political Consultative Conference.
- On November 14, 2011, four pieces of his work including "Shi Er Yuan" was collected again by the Rockefeller family.
- On January 13, 2012, world-famous modern art collector, David Rockefeller Sr. officially included Huang Yue's bird and flower oil painting "Du Dui Xie Yang" into his collection archive.
- On March 20, 2012, his work "Feng Xiao Hua Qiao was collected by Steven. C. Rockefeller III.
- On May 27, 2012, three pieces of his work including "You Yang de Qing Lian was regularly collected by the Rockefeller family.
- On July 01, 2011, he led a leading role in the steering committee of the 2012 (London) Olympic Fine Arts Assembly.
- On July 13, 2012, his work "Xiang Zai Yun Tou" was exhibited in "Creative Cities Collection Fine Arts Exhibition, London in 2012" exhibition, held by China National Art Gallery, also known as the "2012 (London) Olympic Fine Arts Assembly, Beijing Exhibition".
- On August 1, 2012, his work "Xiao Sa Ying Feng" was exhibited in London, UK Barbican Centre, "Creative Cities Collection Fine Arts Exhibition London 2012".
- On September 19, 2012, he was invited to participate "First Annual Beauty of China, Chinese Calligraphy and Painting Arts Festival, held in the Royal Ancestral Temple where he displayed five of his works including "Qing Yan Wei Yu Geng Qing You" which were also displayed on the show were byproducts of his art works, such as silk scarfs and dresses using the design of his works.
- On December 7, 2012, his work "Xiao Sa Ying Feng"and "Xiang Zai Yun Tou" were exhibited in "Beijing Water Cube" exhibition held by China National Art Gallery, which was also known as the "2012 (London) Olympic Fine Arts Assembly, Beijing Exhibition". His work won the Gold medal in this exhibition.
- In March 2013, his work "Fu Shou Tu" and two other water ink paintings were collected by the Rockefeller family.
- In April 2013, his water ink painting "Shou Tao Hu Die" was collected by the famous Italian collector Doct. Giorgio Spoto.
- In May 2013, his water ink painting "Chun Xiao Tu" was collected by Joan Manuel Sevillano Campalans, Chairman of the Fundacio Gala-Salvador Dalí.
- In May 2013, work "Bi He You Quan" collected by Diaoyutai State Guesthouse
- In October 2013, Huang Yue attended Royal Asscher Beijing Sparkle Roll Luxury Brands Culture Expo 2013 Fall with his own designed bird and flower oil painting silk scurf.
- On October 28, 2013, US California Senator Edward and Mayor Su Wang Xiulan collected his flower and bird water ink painting.
- In November 2013, his water ink painting "He Hua, Ti Ouyang Jiong Shi" and another work was collected by the Great Hall of the People.
- In November 2013, his water ink painting "Tao" was collected by one of the founding father of Singapore, Mr. Li Jiongcai.
- On November 24, 2013 New Asia Pacific International Auction Ltd (Macau) held a special auction for Huang Yue's bird and flower and water ink paintings.
- On November 27, 2013 Los Angeles County issued Huang Yue an honorable certification, to recognize his contribute towards international artworks. The Mayor of Los Angeles County, Christine delivered the certificate to Huang Yue in person.
- In January 2014, Huang Yue Art Charitable Fund was founded. It is the only charitable fund that was permitted by
- In January 2014, Huang Yue was invited to design the leaders' outfit for APEC.
- On April 24, 2014, he was invited to attend the Tokyo International Art Exhibition, in Tokyo Metropolitan Art Museum.
- On August 17, 2014, his work "Lotus" was invited to participate "The 2014 NanJing Youth Olympic Games art exhibition".
- From October 1 to 8, 2014, his water ink painting works, 9 pieces, including "He Hua Cui Liao", were invited to exhibit in "China Arts International Exhibition", at Robert Livingston Manor, upstate New York, one of signers of American Declaration of Independence.
- From October 23, 2014 to January 4, 2015, co-exhibition, named "A Park Bench View", held in the Mattatuck Museum, from video works by Steven C. Rockefeller Jr, and painting works by Huang Yue.
- From October 25 to December 1, 2014, exhibition of "Huang Yue Nature's Divine Impression", held at Rockefeller State Park Preserve Art Gallery, New York, USA. Kimberly K. Rockefeller was the planner of this exhibition. Many family members of Rockefeller as well their friends visited the exhibition, among them including David Rockefeller, 99 years old, a famous American banker, philanthropist, and art work collector; Steven C. Rockefeller, Chairman of Rockefeller Brothers Fund; Lucy Rockefeller, daughter of Lawrence Spelman Rockefeller, a famous financier; Steven C. Rockefeller Jr, grandson of Nelson Rockefeller, the 41st Vice President of the United States and the 49th Governor of New York, and Steven C. Rockefeller III, the oldest son of Steven C. Rockefeller Jr.
- Hurun Report for 2014 Artists, Huang Yue ranked 51 on the wealth rankings, and is valued as the top four artists that are creative of both oil painting and Chinese painting.

== Publications ==
- Huang Yue Oil Painting Collection (November 2008, Hong Kong:HuaXia) (Chief editor: Simi Huang) ISBN 988-17002-7-2 1200 HKD
- Huang Yue's Flower and Bird Painting Collection (June 2009, China Literary Federation) (Chief editor: Simi Huang) ISBN 978-7-5059-6423-5 190 RMB
- Huang Yue's Flower and Bird Painting Collection II (April 2010, China Literary Federation) (Chief editor: Simi Huang) ISBN 978-7-5059-4549-4 200 RMB
- Huang Yue's Flower and Bird Painting Collection III (September 2010, China Literary Federation) (Chief editor: Simi Huang) ISBN 978-7-5059-6855-4 300 RMB
- Huang Yue's Flower and Bird Painting Collection IV (August 2011, China Literary Federation) (Chief editor: Simi Huang) ISBN 978-7-5059-7158-5 350 RMB
- Huang Yue's Flower and Bird Painting Collection 2002-2012 (January 2013, China Literary Federation) (Chief editor: Simi Huang) ISBN 978-7-5059-8043-3 368 RMB
- Huang Yue's Painting (May 2016, ShanDong Fine Arts Publishing House) (Chief editor: Simi Huang) ISBN 978-7-5059-8043-3 186 RMB
- Huang Yue's Flower and Bird Color Ink Painting (August 2016, Phoenix Fine Arts Publishing.LTD) (Chief editor: Simi Huang) ISBN 978-7-5580-0290-8 318 RMB
- In July 2009, China Federation of Literary and Art Circles Press published "Huang Yue Bird and Flower Oil Painting Collection". It is the first personal artwork collection published and recorded by State Administration of Press.
- In September 2009, China National Philatelic Corporation published a special edition stamp of Huang Yue's bird and flower oil painting.

== Exhibitions ==
- Traditional Height (Huang Yue oil painting exhibition), January 2009, National Art Museum of China National Academy of Painting, sponsored by Lai Shaoqi Funds
- Huang Yue's Flower and Bird Oil Painting Exhibition, September 2010, National Art Museum of China National Academy of Painting, sponsored by China Collector of Penmanship and Painting Association
- On July 13, 2012, his work Xiang Zai Yun Tou was exhibited in Creative Cities Collection Fine Arts Exhibition, London in 2012 exhibition, held by China National Art Gallery, also known as the 2012 (London) Olympic Fine Arts Assembly, Beijing Exhibition.
- In August 2012, his bird-flower oil painting work, Xiao Sa Ying Feng, exhibited in the Creative Cities Collection Fine Arts Exhibition London 2012, UK Barbican Center, London, England.
- On September 19, 2012, he was invited to participate "First Annual Beauty of China, Chinese Calligraphy and Painting Arts Festival, held in the Royal Ancestral Temple where he displayed five of his works including Qing Yan Wei Yu Geng Qing You which were also displayed on the show were byproducts of his art works, such as silk scarfs and dresses using the design of his works.
- On December 7, 2012, his works Xiao Sa Ying Feng and Xiang Zai Yun Tou were exhibited in Beijing Water Cube exhibition held by China National Art Gallery, which was also known as the 2012 (London) Olympic Fine Arts Assembly, Beijing Exhibition. His work won the Gold medal in this exhibition.
- On October 25, 2013, exhibition of his bird-flower water ink paintings, held in Pasadena Civic Center, Los Angeles, USA.
- On November 24, 2013 New Asia Pacific International Auction Ltd (Macau) held a special auction for Huang Yue's bird and flower and water ink paintings.
- In December, 2013, exhibition of his ink paintings, held in the Fair of Los Angeles, Los Angeles, USA.
- On April 24, 2014, he was invited to attend the Tokyo International Art Exhibition, in Tokyo Metropolitan Art Museum, and Gold Art Award Winner for his bird-flower ink paintings,
- On August 17, 2014, his work Lotus and Green Birds was invited to participate “The 2014 NanJing Youth Olympic Games art exhibition”.
- From October 1 to 8, 2014, his water ink painting works, 9 pieces, including “Lotus and Green Birds”, were invited to exhibit in “China Arts International Exhibition”, at Robert Livingston Manor, upstate New York, one of signers of American Declaration of Independence.
- From October 23, 2014 to January 4, 2015, co-exhibition, named “A Park Bench View”, held in the Mattatuck Museum, from video works by Steven C. Rockefeller Jr, and painting works by Huang Yue.
- From October 25 to December 1, 2014, exhibition of “Huang Yue Nature's Divine Impression”, held at Rockefeller State Park Preserve Art Gallery, New York, USA. Kimberly K. Rockefeller was the planner of this exhibition. Many family members of Rockefeller as well their friends visited the exhibition, among them including David Rockefeller, 99 years old, a famous American banker, philanthropist, and art work collector; Steven C. Rockefeller, Chairman of Rockefeller Brothers Fund; Lucy Rockefeller, daughter of Lawrence Spelman Rockefeller, a famous financier; Steven C. Rockefeller Jr, grandson of Nelson Rockefeller, the 41st Vice President of the United States and the 49th Governor of New York, and Steven C. Rockefeller III, the oldest son of Steven C. Rockefeller Jr.
- On January 24, 2015, Huang Yue Flower and Bird Painting Exhibition, hosted by Huang Yue Art Charity Fund, were held in Beijing Times Art Gallery. The exhibition displayed 30 oil paintings and 50 water ink paintings of Huang Yue. It is the first show of Huang Yue's China tour “Tian Ci Expression” show sponsored by the Rockefeller family.
- On April 28, 2015, Consulate-General of the Republic of Italy in Chongqing hosted “Forever” art exhibition for Huang Yue's painting in Chongqing's landmark Global Financial Center. The exhibition, sponsored by the Italian Consulate General in Chongqing, was attended by Paolo Gentiloni, Minister of Foreign Affairs and International Cooperation of Italy; Alberto Bradanini, Italy's ambassador to China; Chen Luping, Deputy Mayor of Chongqing; as well as other guests. Huang Yue's 15 paintings were permanently collected by the Italian government.
- On June 3, 2015, Huang Yue's Flowers and Birds painting exhibition“Return to the Nature” was held in Guangzhou.
- On June 16, 2015, Huan Yue's Flower and Bird Painting Exhibition was hosted by Peking University in Peking University Library. On June 18, Huang Yue painting forum hold in Art Center, Peking University.
- On June 18, 2015, Huang Yue's Flower and Bird painting seminar, Peking University, aesthetics and Aesthetic Education Center.
- On September 8, 2015, the China Millennium Monument held Northeast Asia Calligraphy Exchange Exhibition subjected “harmony but not sameness ".
- On September 11, 2015, China Everbright Bank held Huang Yue's painting exhibition and art investment seminar.
- On October 19, 2015, the first Art Exhibition was held by Huang Yue Art Fund and the Beijing Film Academy.
- On October 24, 2015, Today Art Museum, MARTELLO YACHTING hosted the art exhibition of painting. The works include oil painting and color ink painting, in total 13 pieces.
- On December 14, 2015, Huang Yue's Art Exhibition was held by Huang Yue Art Fund and the United Nations in New York.
- On October 1, 2016, "Huang Yue's Flowers and Birds Painting Exhibition" was held in 798Enjoy Art Museum.
- On December 30, 2016, the grand opening of Huang Yue's Flowers and Birds Painting Exhibition, which was jointly organized by Huang Yue Art Fund and Memorial Hall of the father of Taiwan, was held in the memorial hall in Taiwan. Former vice president with his wife, former Administration Bureau president Tang Fei, former Minister of Foreign Affairs of Taiwan, as well as dozens of members of the Legislative Council came to congratulate the opening. Wang Jinping, the former president of the Legislature of Taiwan and Lin Guozhang, the founder of the father's memorial hall, addressed the opening speech. Xu Linong, the president of Whampoa Military Academy of Taiwan, sent a basket of congratulations.
- On February 14 to 19, 2017, attended the 2017 Grand Palace Art Exhibition which was hosted by French Ministry of Culture and the French National Museum.
- On April 21 to 24, 2017, attended the 2017 Artexpo New York Art Exhibition.
