= Chang Tso-chi =

Taiwanese film director

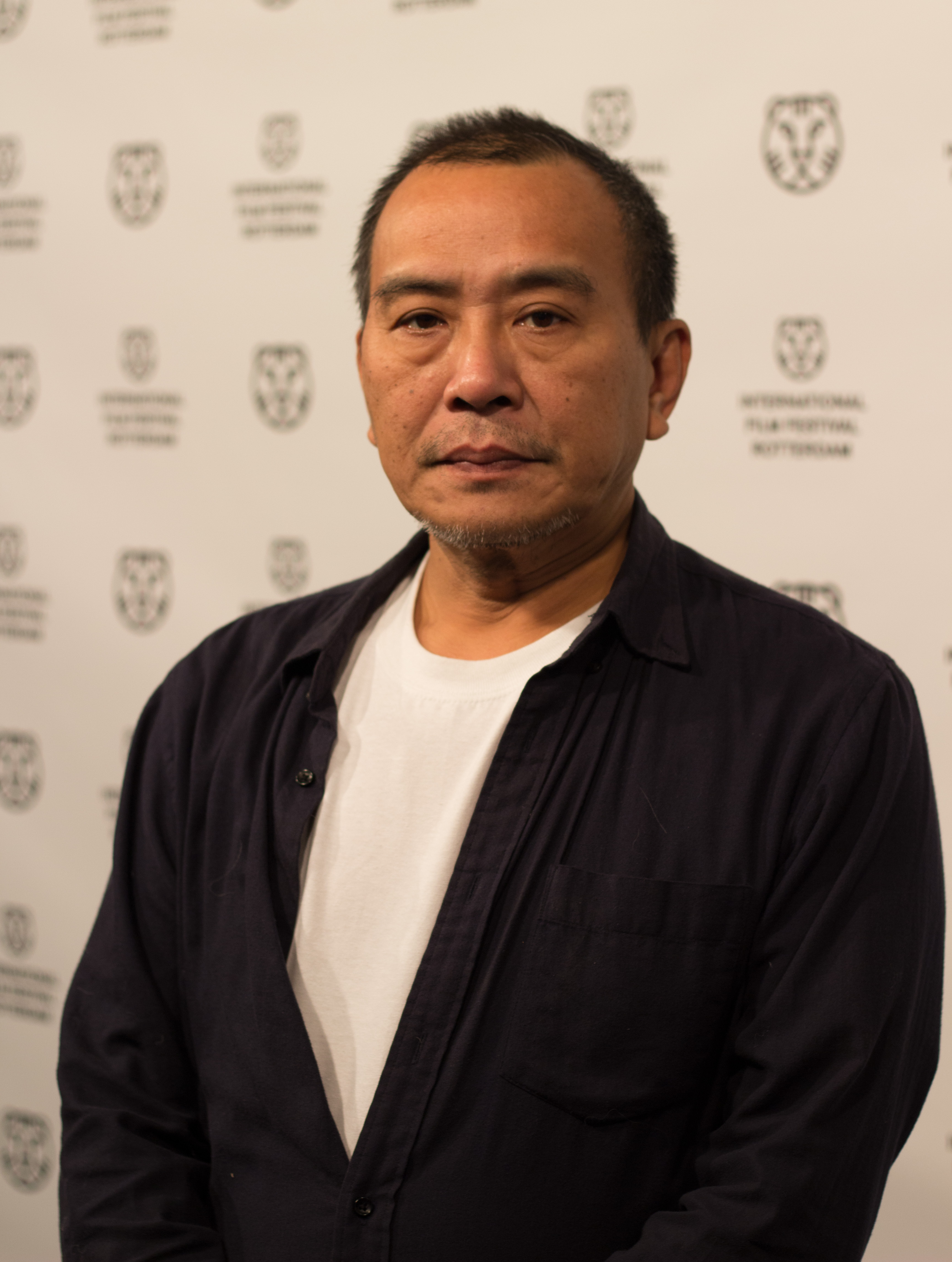
- Born: 26 December 1961 (age 64); Chiayi, Taiwan
- Occupation: Film director

Chang Tso-chi (Chinese: 張作驥; pinyin: Zhāng Zuòjì; born 26 December 1961) is a Taiwanese film director. His 2002 film The Best of Times was entered into the 59th Venice International Film Festival. His films won Golden Horse Award for Best Feature Film two times, for The Best of Times (2002) and When Love Comes (2010).

Chang was arrested and charged with rape in Taiwan in May 2013. He was found guilty in June 2014 and was sentenced to 3 years and 10 months in prison. He was released on parole on August 17, 2017. He served a total of 2 years, 4 months and 7 days in prison.

== Life and career ==
Chang Tso-chi was born in Chiayi. Both of Chang's parents migrated to Taiwan from Guangdong, Mainland China following the Chinese Nationalists' defeat in the Chinese Civil War in 1949. Chang started his career in the film industry as an assistant photographer and then assistant director. He learned his craft from renowned directors such as Hou Hsiao-hsien, Tsui Hark and Yim Ho. In 1988, he worked as Hou Hsiao-hsien's first assistant director on A City of Sadness.

In 1999, his second feature Darkness and Light was screened in the Directors' Fortnight section of the 52nd Cannes Film Festival, and won the Grand Prix at the 12th Tokyo International Film Festival. His third feature The Best of Times was entered into the main competition section of 59th Venice International Film Festival, and won Golden Horse Award for Best Feature Film.

== Sexual crime ==
In 2013, a female screenwriter accused him of rape after a party at his studio. Chang initially denied the charges, but later admitted that he was completely drunk and blacked out. After DNA evidence was produced, he was sentenced to three years and ten months in jail. He began to serve his term of imprisonment on April 10, 2015. During imprisonment, he finished the short film True Emotion Behind the Wall with all the actors and other staffs being his fellow inmates in prison in 2017. The short later won the Taipei Film Awards for best short film. Chang was released on parole on 17 August 2017.

== Filmography ==
=== Features ===
- 1996 : Ah Chung (忠仔)
- 1999 : Darkness and Light (黑暗之光)
- 2002 : The Best of Times (美麗時光)
- 2008 : Soul of a Demon (蝴蝶)
- 2009 : How are you, Dad? (爸 ... 你好嗎?)
- 2010 : When Love Comes (當愛來的時候)
- 2013 : A Time in Quchi (暑假作業)
- 2015 : Thanatos, Drunk (醉·生夢死)
- 2019 : Synapses (那個我最親愛的陌生人)
- 2022 : Flotsam and Jetsam (夏日天空的那匹紅馬)

=== Shorts ===
- 2011 : Sparkles (1949穿過黑暗的火花; Segment of the anthology film 10+10)
- 2017 : True Emotion Behind the Wall (鹹水雞的滋味)
