= The Best of Times (2002 film) =

- Film poster
- Directed by: Chang Tso-chi
- Written by: Chang Tso-chi
- Produced by: Chang Tso-chi; Lu Shih-yuan
- Starring: Wing Fan; Kao Meng-Chieh
- Cinematography: Chang Yi-Min
- Edited by: Liao Ching-sung
- Music by: Thio Hugo-Panduputra; Raining Pleasure
- Production companies: NHK Enterprises; Chang Tso-chi Film Studio
- Release dates: 1 September 2002 (Venice Film Festival); 20 September 2002 (Taiwan)
- Running time: 112 minutes
- Country: Taiwan
- Languages: Mandarin; Hakka; Taiwanese

The Best of Times (Chinese: 美麗時光; pinyin: Měilì Shíguāng) is a 2002 Taiwanese narrative film directed by Chang Tso-chi. In the film, "Chang Tso-chi wraps the sensibility of urban alienation and lost youth around a typical kids-in-gangland story and infuses it with his own gentle brand of magic realism." The Best of Times was entered into the 59th Venice International Film Festival. It was also selected as the Taiwanese entry for the Best Foreign Language Film at the 75th Academy Awards, but it was not nominated.

== Plot ==
Two young cousins, Ah Wei and Ah Jie, are best friends, despite their different personalities. They grow up together, living with their widower fathers and other family members, in a Hakka village infused with multiple local dialects in the suburbs of Taipei. Mildly ashamed of their background, the long alley leading toward the edge of their village becomes their secret passage to escape to a surreal world where their poor and decaying neighborhood turns into a dream land. All the ordinary surroundings change completely into the set for a fairytale and the piglets, pigeons, and ducks transform into charming characters.

Caught between reality and fantasy, Ah Wei and Ah Jie fall in with Taipei gangsters, drawn to the money, the excitement, and the chance to moor their drifting lives. Sensible Ah Wei’s attempt to stay on an even keel is constantly frustrated by the actions of his tearaway best friend, Ah Jie, who proves a dangerous liability when Ah Wei is promoted from a nightclub parking valet to a debt collector in Brother Gu’s gang and asks that Ah Jie works alongside him.

Ah Wei’s older sister, Ah Min, has cancer. She breaks up with her boyfriend, Brother Tse, as she enters the last stage of cancer. On the eve of her life, she decides to return to the home she so desperately tries to escape from before. Ah Min often stares blankly at the colorful tropical fish aquarium in the living room to mourn for her passing romance while counting toward the end of her life. Ah Wei shares his youthful dreams and fantastical getaway moments with Ah Min when he takes care of her and strolls her around the neighborhood in her wheelchair. Ah Min tells Ah Wei that she wants to be born into this same family again if there is a next life.

As Ah Min approaches the end of her life, the handgun that is given to Ah Wei and Ah Jie as a reward also precipitates the inevitable lurch into a violent end for these two best friends. With the handgun around, short-fused Ah Jie becomes even more reckless and foolhardy, causing him to accidentally shoot the big boss of their rival gang to death when Ah Wei and Ah Jie try to collect debts from them. Forced to run for their lives, Ah Wei and Ah Jie hide in Brother Tse’s house in Yilan. Ah Wei notices that Brother Tse also has a colorful tropical fish aquarium in his house, which looks exactly like the one Ah Min stares at every day. This makes Ah Wei believe that the tropical fish aquarium is the token of his sister's love and romance with Brother Tse.

After Ah Min passes away, Ah Wei and Ah Jie return to their village but find the rival gang looking for them. Ah Jie gets shot. As Ah Wei runs for his life, he sees Ah Jie rejoining him. They run and leap into the gutter. The muddy water turns crystal clear, just like the tropical fish aquarium of Ah Wei’s sister. Ah Wei and Ah Jie swim in the water so freely as if another glorious adventure awaits them in the deep end of the ocean.

== Cast ==
- Wing Fan as Ah Wei – A cautious, calm, and sensible 19-year-old teenager who climbs his way up in the underworld, from a parking valet to a debt collector trusted by the gang-boss.
- Kao Meng-Chieh as Ah Jie – Ah Wei’s cousin and best friend. Short-fused, impetuous, and reckless, he is everything Ah Wei is not.
- Wu Yu-chih as Ah Min – Ah Wei's older sister who has cancer and eventually passes away due to illness. She adores her tropical fish aquarium, which Ah Wei later finds out to be identical to the one in her ex-boyfriend, Big Brother’s home.
- Yu Wan-mei as Granny, Ah Wei's grandmother
- Tien Mao-ying as Ah Wei's father
- Su Chu-mei as Ah Wei's great aunt
- Lin Hen-bao as Ah Jie's father
- Ho Huang-chi as Ah Jie's older brother
- Tsai Ming-hsiu as Ah Jie's uncle-in-law
- Chang Shang-ting as Dudu, Ah Wei's younger sister
- Chang Feng-feng as Ah Jie's aunt
- Zeng Yi-tse as Brother Tse – Ah Min's ex-boyfriend, who offers his home for Ah Wei and Ah Jie's hideout. He also has a tropical fish aquarium in his house.
- Hsieh Yueh-hsia as Ah Tse's mother

== Production ==
The international exposure of Chang Tso-chi's earlier works helped him acquire investment and explore overseas markets. His third feature film, The Best of Times, was completed with funding from the Japanese broadcasting corporation NHK and attracted the attention of French and Spanish film distributors when shown at the Venice Film Festival. "It's definitely not enough for Taiwan-made movies to rely solely on the local market", Chang noted in an interview. "To survive, I need to strive for the support of foreign investors."

== Reception ==
Chicago Reader film critic, Shelly Kraicer, in her review of the film, praised Chang Tso-chi as "the poet of Taiwan’s second generation of filmmakers, a loosely defined group who followed new-wave masters such as Hou Hsiao-hsien and Edward Yang." She further described The Best of Times as "more visionary experiments than narrative exercises. Here he [Chang Tso-chi] envelops each scene in a gorgeous half-lit glow, immersing Wei and Jie in virtual water—like fish in an aquarium, one of the film’s recurring motifs.”

In his overview of the 38th Annual Chicago International Film Festival, Chicago Tribune cultural critic, Patrick Z. McGavin, drew an analogy between The Best of Times’s plot of a studied, restrained character in conflict with a brash and romantic outlaw and the plot of Mean Streets, and observed that, through director Tso-chi’s social observation, "tangled emotions and complex feelings endow the movie with a poetic beauty."

Time Out New York writer TCh applauded The Best of Times for "boast[ing] a most original ending." TCh also described The Best of Times as "a fine film, gorgeously photographed by Chang Yi-Min in a sumptuous palette of blues, greens and reds." Putting the conventional scenario aside, TCh noted that every moment of the film "hangs balanced between the promise and uncertainty of youthful experience."

== Soundtrack ==
In addition to a curated selection of Western music by Louis Armstrong, Teddy Thompson, Ed Harcourt, Doves, Starfall Orb, Raining Pleasure, and Turin Brakes (among others), Chang Tso-chi worked with long-time creative partner Chang Yi (張藝), for the soundtrack of The Best of Times. Chang Yi wrote four songs for this film: "Youth" (青春), "Rainbow Rain" (七彩的雨), "I Am a Fish" (我是魚), and "The Best of Times" (美麗時光). The soundtrack also included a brand new guitar remix, performed by Chang Yi, of Lin Hui-ping's 1991 song, "Station".

=== Tracklist ===
1. "Youth" (青春) / Chang Yi (張藝)
2. "We Have All the Time in the World" / Louis Armstrong
3. "Let Your Shoulder Fall" / Matthew Jay
4. "If I Ever Feel Better" / Phoenix
5. "Missing Children" / Teddy Thompson
6. "Rainbow Rain" (七彩的雨) / Chang Yi (張藝)
7. "She Fell into My Arms" / Ed Harcourt
8. "There Goes the Fear" / Doves
9. "I Am a Fish" (我是魚) / Zhang Yi (張藝)
10. "Lullaby" / Starfall Orb
11. "Fake" / Raining Pleasure
12. "Feeling Oblivion" / Turin Brakes
13. "The Best of Times" (美麗時光) / Chang Yi (張藝)
14. "Station" (驛) / Lin Hui-ping (林慧萍)

== Awards ==
Awards
Award/Ceremony	Category	Name	Outcome
59th Venice International Film Festival	Golden Lion	Chang Tso-chi	Nominated
39th Golden Horse Film Awards	Best Feature Film	The Best of Times	Won
39th Golden Horse Film Awards	Best Director	Chang Tso-chi	Nominated
39th Golden Horse Film Awards	Best Leading Actor	Wing Fan	Nominated
39th Golden Horse Film Awards	Best Supporting Actor	Kao Meng-chieh	Nominated
39th Golden Horse Film Awards	Best New Performer	Kao Meng-chieh	Nominated
39th Golden Horse Film Awards	Best Original Screenplay	Chang Tso-chi	Nominated
39th Golden Horse Film Awards	Best Cinematography	Chang Tso-chi	Nominated
39th Golden Horse Film Awards	Original Music Award for Best Film	Thio Hugo-Panduputra	Nominated
39th Golden Horse Film Awards	Best Film Editing	Liao Ching-song	Nominated
39th Golden Horse Film Awards	Outstanding Taiwanese Film of the Year	The Best of Times	Won
39th Golden Horse Film Awards	Audience Choice Award	The Best of Times	Won
3rd Chinese Film Media Awards	Best Film (Hong Kong/Taiwan)	The Best of Times	Won
3rd Chinese Film Media Awards	Best Director (Hong Kong/Taiwan)	Chang Tso-chi	Won
3rd Chinese Film Media Awards	Best Actor (Hong Kong/Taiwan)	Wing Fan	Nominated
3rd Chinese Film Media Awards	Best Actor (Hong Kong/Taiwan)	Kao Meng-Chieh	Nominated
14th Singapore International Film Festival	Best Asian Feature	The Best of Times	Won
14th Singapore International Film Festival	Best Actor	Wing Fan	Won

== See also ==
- List of submissions to the 75th Academy Awards for Best Foreign Language Film
- List of Taiwanese submissions for the Academy Award for Best Foreign Language Film
