= May You Stay Forever Young =

2021 Hong Kong film by Rex Ren and Lam Sum

- Taiwanese theatrical poster
- Traditional Chinese: 少年
- Literal meaning: Youngster
- Jyutping: Siu^{3} Nin^{4}
- Directed by: Rex Ren; Lam Sum
- Screenplay by: Daniel Chan; Rex Ren
- Produced by: Rex Ren; Little Jane; Daniel Chan
- Starring: Yu Tsz-wing; Li Pui-yi; Suen Kwan-to; Maya Tsang; Calvin Tong; Ivy Pang; Ray Ho; Suen Ching; Sammi Mak
- Cinematography: Ming; Benny Chan
- Edited by: L2; Rex Ren
- Music by: Akitsugu Fukushima
- Production company: Phone Made Good Film
- Release dates: 15 November 2021 (TGHFF); 21 December 2024 (YouTube)
- Running time: 86 minutes
- Country: Hong Kong
- Language: Cantonese

May You Stay Forever Young (Chinese: 少年) is a 2021 Hong Kong drama film directed by Rex Ren and Lam Sum, written and produced by Ren and Daniel Chan. The film, set in the background of the 2019–2020 Hong Kong protests, was produced by Phone Made Good Film and stars an ensemble cast of nine. It focuses on a group of Hongkongers, including protesters, volunteers, and a social worker, who form a rescue team in an attempt to find and save a young girl (Yu Tsz-wing) struggling with suicidal thoughts amid the protests. Documented footage of the protests is also included in the film.

Following the 12 June 2019 Hong Kong protest and the death of Marco Leung Ling-kit, a wave of suicides emerged in Hong Kong, prompting the formation of volunteer teams by the protesters to locate and rescue those in attempts to suicide. Rex Ren was intrigued and envisioned a narrative based on the volunteer efforts, co-writing the story with Daniel Chan under the working title We from July to September 2019. Principal photography began in October but was suspended in November, leading to shifts in funding and significant changes in the cast and crew before production resumed in September 2020. Post-production was completed in October 2021, featuring a score composed by Akitsugu Fukushima. Filmmakers Shu Kei and Fruit Chan also contributed to the film's creation.

In May 2021, the film was submitted for review to the Office for Film, Newspaper, and Article Administration, but was not approved, marking it the first film banned for screening in Hong Kong following the amendment of the Film Censorship Ordinance. The film was also banned in Malaysia for allegedly glorifying violence and risking China–Malaysia relations. It had its world premiere at the 2021 Golden Horse Film Festival on 15 November 2021, and was subsequently released in theatres in Taiwan, the United States, and Japan. The film won a NETPAC Award and received generally positive reviews from critics for its subject matter, realistic portrayal of protesters, and aesthetics, though it faced criticism for its narrative and thematic depth. In December 2024, it was publicly released on YouTube to support the coinciding Bluebird Movement in Taiwan.

== Plot ==
During the Sheung Wan protest on 21 July 2019, a pair of best friends and peaceful protesters, YY and Ho, are arrested. They witness one of their fellow protesters being sexually assaulted by the police. Shortly after her arrest, Ho decides to migrate from Hong Kong, blaming YY for encouraging her to stay after the peaceful rallies. Ho's change in attitude leads YY to feel hopeless. On 28 July, she writes a suicide note and calls Nam, a valiant protester she met during the arrest, to say farewell. Concerned for her safety, Nam, who is heading to the rallies at Chater Garden with his girlfriend Bell, voluntary drivers Fai and Zoe, and fellow protesters Louis and Mr. Burnism, informs the group that YY might be contemplating suicide. He proposes they search for her. Although Louis initially objects, believing the Chater rallies are more important, Fai suggests they have a quick look at YY's hometown Kwai Fong first.

In Kwai Fong, the group is joined by Bao, a social worker who provides counseling to young protesters, after seeing their messages in the Telegram group for the rallies. Bao assesses that YY is likely experiencing suicidal thoughts, noting that individuals in such states often act within eight hours, and urges the group to find her immediately. The group splits up to ask pedestrians for information. Bao coincidentally approaches Ho at a beverage shop, who hesitates to talk about YY, and Bao leaves her phone number for her. Mr. Burnism calls for help in the Telegram groups, leading many protesters to conduct a thorough search in all other areas of Hong Kong outside of Kwai Fong. Bell asks a delivery man who recognises YY and directs them to her public housing estate. While searching door-by-door, Bao receives a call from Ho, providing YY's exact address. The group rushes to YY's apartment and breaks in, only to find a suicide note addressed to her father, expressing her desire to prove the protests' significance through her death.

Just then, Mr. Burnism sees YY has posted a selfie with a doll on social media. The group heads to a claw machine arcade, where they learn from a customer that YY left an hour earlier. But their loud discussions attract nearby undercover police, who begin to tail them. Nam notices them and tries to lead the group away, but Louis refuses, insisting on going to the rallies. They argue, leading to a fight, and the police seize the opportunity to detain them. The officers take the group into an alley and begin searching them, provoking the boys and sexually molesting Zoe. Mr. Burnism, who initially escapes, returns to ambush the police, allowing Nam, Bell, and Louis to flee, though Fai is brutally beaten, and Zoe and Bao are arrested.

Louis blames Nam for causing injuries and arrests for nothing and leads Mr. Burnism away to join the protests at Chater Road. Feeling he has failed to save YY, Nam breaks down in tears, confessing to Bell that he has concealed the fact that YY was arrested while trying to help him after he was shot with a rubber bullet, but Bell encourages him. Meanwhile, they spot the doll from YY's selfie dropped nearby. They rush to the rooftop of the adjacent building, where they find YY, with Ho arriving shortly after. The three of them try to persuade YY not to commit suicide, explaining that her death would be in vain and accomplish nothing for Hong Kong. But despite their pleas, YY leaps off the building. Just as she falls, Nam grabs her arm, followed by Bell and Ho.

== Cast ==
- Yu Tsz-wing as YY, a 17-year-old teenage girl who is arrested during the 2019–2020 Hong Kong protests and contemplates suicide
- Li Pui-yi as Ho Ji-yuet, YY's best friend
- Suen Kwan-to as Lam "Nam" Chi-nam, a construction worker and valiant protester
- Maya Tsang as Bell, a university student, peaceful protester, and Nam's girlfriend
- Calvin Tong as Louis Lui, a valiant protester
- Ivy Pang as Bao, a social worker
- Ray Ho as Mr. Burnism, a 15-year-old teenager who serves as a scout during the protest
- Suen Ching as Bro Fai, a voluntary driver
- Sammi Mak as Zoe, Fai's sister who assists with his volunteer driving

Also featuring cameo appearances by directors Rex Ren and Lam Sum, who portray an undercover police officer and the owner of a beverage shop, while screenwriter-producer Daniel Chan portrays a delivery man.

== Production ==
=== Background ===
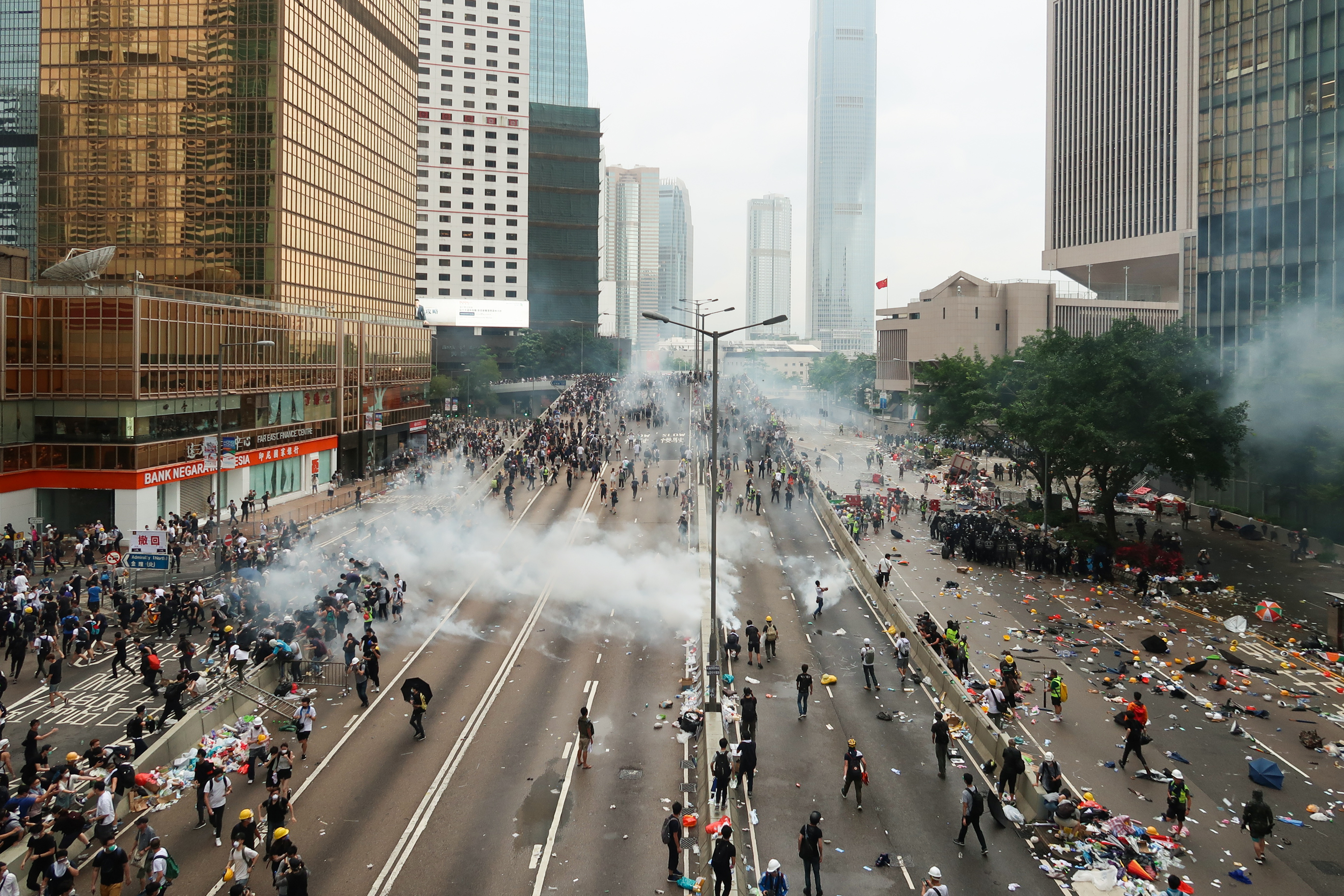
The first police-civilian clash of the Anti-Extradition Bill Movement took place on 12 June 2019

In June 2019, the Hong Kong government introduced a bill to amend the Fugitive Offenders Ordinance concerning extradition without public consent, which sparked a series of protests. A protest on 12 June 2019 faced violent suppression by the police, further fuelling public dissatisfaction with the government's refusal to respond to public sentiment and impacting the mental health of the protesters. Following the police-civilian clashes, Hong Kong experienced a wave of suicides, (Note: At least nine suicides were directly linked to the 2019–2020 Hong Kong protests.) beginning with Marco Leung Ling-kit, where numerous young people took their lives to make a statement in support for the protests. In response to the rising suicide rates, some volunteer teams were formed in Telegram groups to monitor social media posts for signs of suicidal intent and to crowdsource information to locate and intervene with those at risk.

=== Pre-production ===
The directors and screenwriters of May You Stay Forever Young, Rex Ren, Lam Sum, and Daniel Chan, all participated in the 2019–2020 Hong Kong protests and took part in the rescue operations of the volunteer teams. Ren was approached by an anonymous film producer (Note: In interviews with Initium Media and Okapi, it was stated that Shu Kei had been the producer of the film since its inception, but there is no confirmation as to whether the anonymous producer is Shu or someone else.) who discussed the volunteer teams that emerged during the protests with him and envisioned to create a film about them, seeking a group of new Hong Kong directors to lead the project. Intrigued by the subject matter, Ren accepted the invitation and set aside his then-current project, A Life of Papers, which had been greenlit at the Golden Horse Project Promotion in 2018 and was entering the pre-production stage during the protests. Veteran filmmaker Shu Kei served as the producer of the film and was involved in the project from its early stages. Ren noted that Shu had significant creative differences with the younger filmmakers on the production team, as Shu primarily learned about the protests from the news and considered the young filmmakers' approaches to be too impulsive and naive when they aimed to break stereotypes of the protesters while designing the characters. In Shu's original vision, he depicted the two protagonists as orphans growing up in Po Leung Kuk, while the female protagonist YY, who lived in a public housing estate, would soak in a bathtub when she felt depressed. Ren described these settings as heavily influenced by Shu's filmmaking experiences from the 1980s to 90s, and he deemed them unrealistic. Shu also named the project with the working title We without consulting the rest of the production team.

Ren became acquainted with film critic Daniel Chan while joining protests together, and he told Chan about the conception of the film during one of the rallies, where Chan expressed interest. Scriptwriting began in July 2019, having a skeleton completed by late July. Ren and Chan co-wrote the screenplay together at Ren's home. During the process, Ren and Lam conducted field research, which included joining Telegram groups of volunteer teams and interviewing social workers and support groups to learn about the mental states of those seeking help, as well as gathering insights from actual volunteers and psychologists. In an early draft, Ren included a conscientious policeman who secretly assisted the volunteer team. However, the character and subplot were later removed during rewrites, as Ren felt he could not convince himself that such Hong Kong policemen actually exist. The story was also initially intended to unfold over two hours, as the filmmakers discovered through their field research that individuals contemplating suicide often act within five minutes to one hour, but they ultimately extended the timeframe to a full day as the original duration was too short for their plot, allowing for a climax set after sunset.

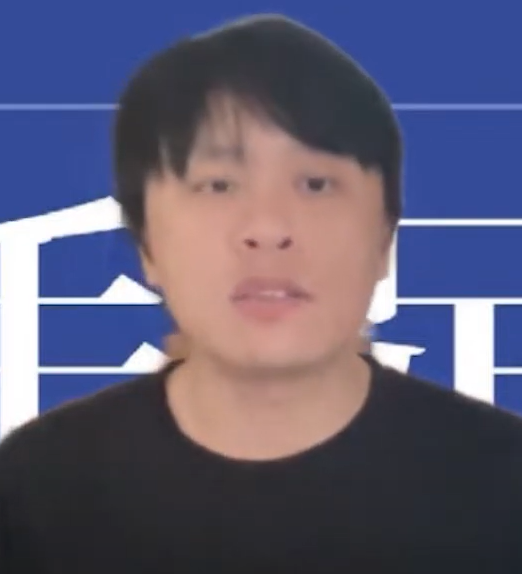
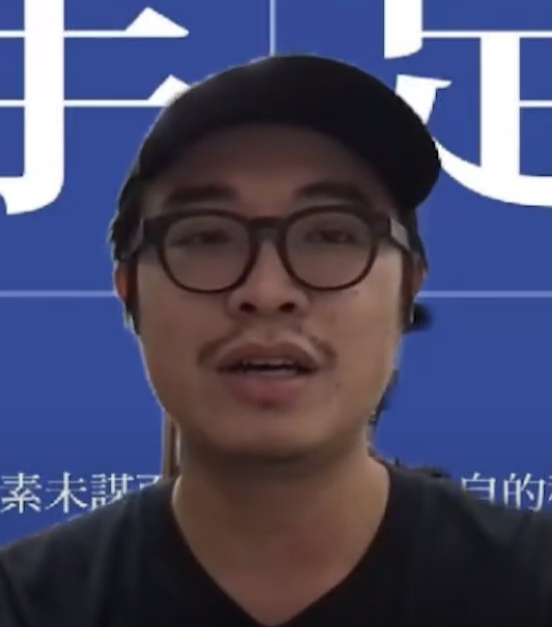
Directors Rex Ren (left) and Lam Sum (right) interviewed by Civil Media Taiwan

The screenplay was finalised by September 2019, with the entire writing period spanning less than a month. The project was originally intended to have three directors, each filming a storyline separately, but the third director withdrew before filming began, leaving Ren and Lam Sum as co-directors. Lam had a friend who also experienced suicidal thoughts during the protests, which deeply affected him regarding the subject matter. Ren described their co-direction as clearly defined, with Lam responsible for managing the actors, while Ren handled the filming and decision-making. Ren initially planned to participate in the 2019 Golden Horse Project Promotion to seek funding but chose not to join the project market to avoid early public disclosure and unnecessary attention. He secured funding from an anonymous source and moved the filming date up to October 2019.

Aside from stage actress Ivy Pang and three drama students, the other leading actors had no prior acting experience. Ren selected a group of potential amateurs for auditions, including Calvin Tong, whom he approached at a mall, as well as Ivy Pang, Sammi Mak, and Suen Ching, with whom he was already acquainted with. The original actor for Nam was also approached by Ren during a protest march in Wan Chai. Both Pang and Mak found their characters reminiscent of their own real-life experiences and accepted Ren's invitation. Ray Ho, who was 14 years old during filming, was approached by the production crew on social media after they saw his interview with the political satirical YouTube channel 100Most. Li Pui-yi auditioned for the role of YY in the first shoot but was unsuccessful. Some individuals who were not cast in roles during auditions volunteered as extras portraying arrested protesters.

=== First shoot ===
The film employed chroma keying to recreate the 2019–2020 Hong Kong protests

Principal photography began in October 2019, originally intended to wrap within ten days. The creators insisted on not shooting the film at the protest sites, as they believed the protests were unrelated to their story and considered it "immoral" to exploit the movement for their filmmaking. But due to a lack of funding, the production team initially struggled to recreate the protest scenes during the scriptwriting stage. Ren and Chan later decided to film these scenes with chroma keying instead of at the actual locations, drawing inspiration from the opening battle scene of Bram Stoker's Dracula (1992). They first tried to rent the production studios at the Hong Kong Academy for Performing Arts, but were rejected due to the film's "sensitive subject matter", and the scenes were ultimately shot at a studio run by Ren's former classmates.

The climactic scene of the characters arguing was filmed at the junction of Nathan Road and Argyle Street, and the same scene was later filmed again during the second shoot in 2020, with both shoots conducted without authorisation. During the first shoot, an elderly pedestrian mistakenly thought the argument was real and intervened to stop the fight. Due to the ongoing social movement, Ren noted that the public was very sensitive about their filming, and numerous venues denied their requests to shoot. Filming lasted only several days, (Note: There are conflicting reports regarding the duration of the first shoot, with Hong Kong Inmedia stating it was four days, Citizen News stating it was seven days, while Mirror Media stating it was seven working days.) and was suspended in November, with only seven scenes completed, citing reasons related to funding issues and the arrest of a lead actor during the Hong Kong Polytechnic University campus conflict. The production team had intended to resume filming once after the Polytechnic University campus conflict, but ended up failed due to the emergence of COVID-19 pandemic. It was originally set to include a scene shot in Taiwan, featuring a second suicide victim who was helped by firefighters and a conscientious police officer, but the scene was scrapped along with the filming suspension and was cut during the second shoot due to budget constraints.

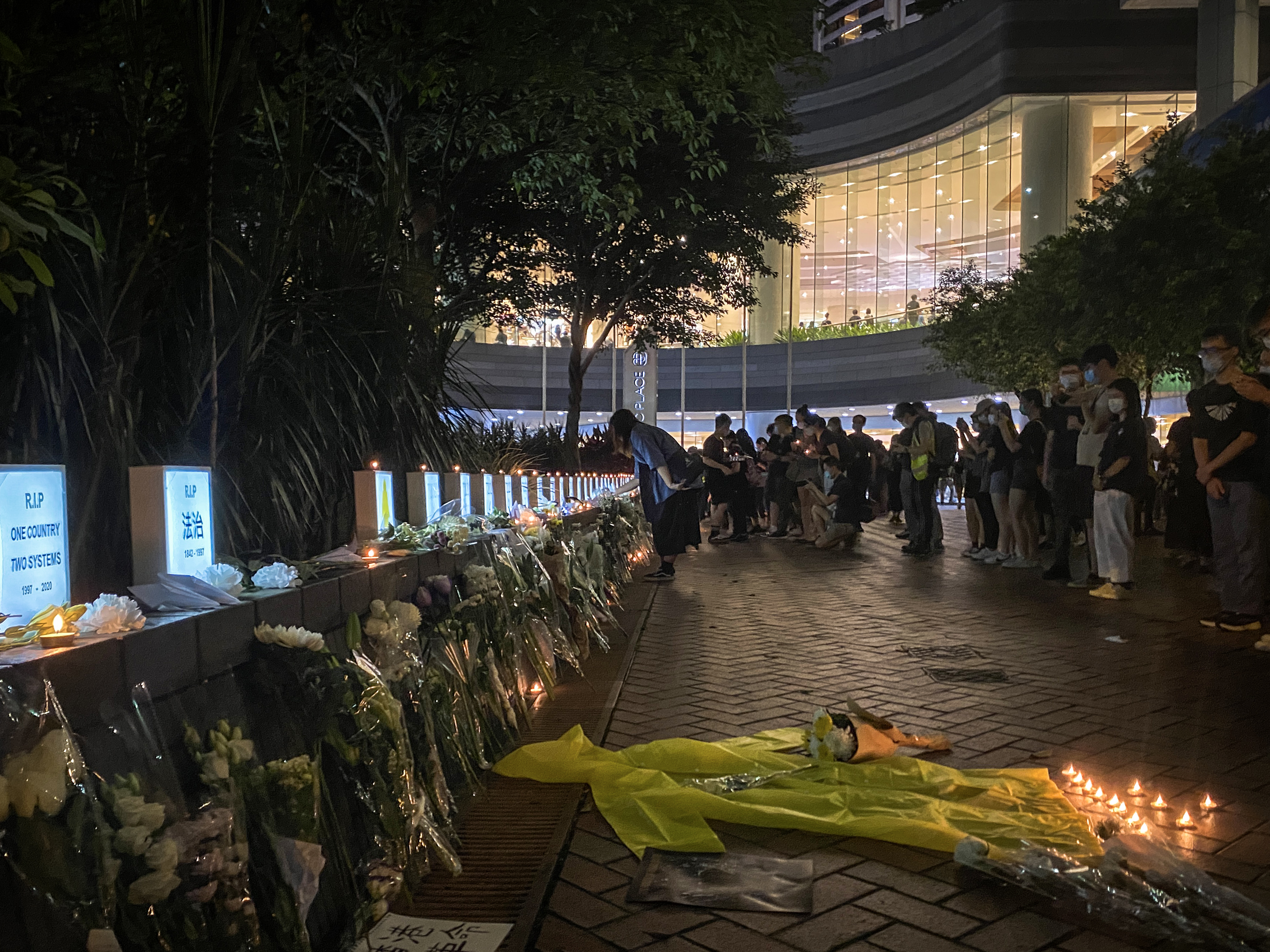
A scene was filmed outside Pacific Place in Admiralty on 15 June 2020, during a public memorial event for Marco Leung Ling-kit

To secure funding and resume production, Ren and Chan each contributed HK$100,000 and edited a short video using existing footage to pitch to friends and family, raising an additional HK$100,000. They also applied for a government fund, which unexpectedly approved their application, providing about HK$200,000 in funding. However, this funding was later revoked and they did not receive the final two payments. With a total budget of HK$600,000 (~US$77,000), the crew resumed production in September 2020, rewriting the screenplay and recruiting new actors. After meeting while filming the RTHK miniseries Find My Guilty (2020), Li Pui-yi and Suen Kwan-to were invited by Ren to join the second shoot, and both accepted the offer, with Suen stating that he wanted to "seize every acting opportunity". Suen concealed his involvement in the film from his family, claiming only that he had cut his hair short to portray a construction worker. Ren also hosted a meal at his home for the original cast, convincing them to join the revival of the project, with Ho and Tong agreeing to return. On 15 June 2020, the production team filmed a scene in which YY (played by Yu Tsz-wing) witnesses a queue of people paying their respects to Marco Leung Ling-kit on a tram, shot on location outside Pacific Place in Admiralty during the first anniversary of Leung's death, with real mourners present.

=== Second shoot ===
The second shoot took place in September 2020, with a total of 15 scenes shot over 15 days. More than half of the cast and crew dropped out between the first and second shoots, and due to the change in the cast, all footage from the first shoot was unusable, and all scenes had to be reshot. Shu also left the project before the second shoot began, and the crew changed the project title to May You Stay Forever Young on the recommendation of David Chan, (Note: David Chan is the co-founder of Phone Made Good Film, alongside Rex Ren and Daniel Chan, and he served as an associate producer for the film.) inspired by the lyrics of Bob Dylan's song "Forever Young". Most of the filming was done as a flash mob due to the pandemic's social distancing and mask mandate, which prohibited crowd gatherings and actors from removing their masks. The entire cast and crew only met for a few rehearsals before filming. They rehearsed and prepared exit routes for the actors, while planning the camera placements away from the actual filming location. After shooting, the actors would disperse and regroup at a basement fast food restaurant, which the production team used as their base. To avoid drawing attention, the filming crew was limited to a maximum of 10 members. Due to budget constraints, Ren, Lam, and Chan all made cameo appearances in minor roles in the film, with screenwriter Chan also serving as the script supervisor on set.

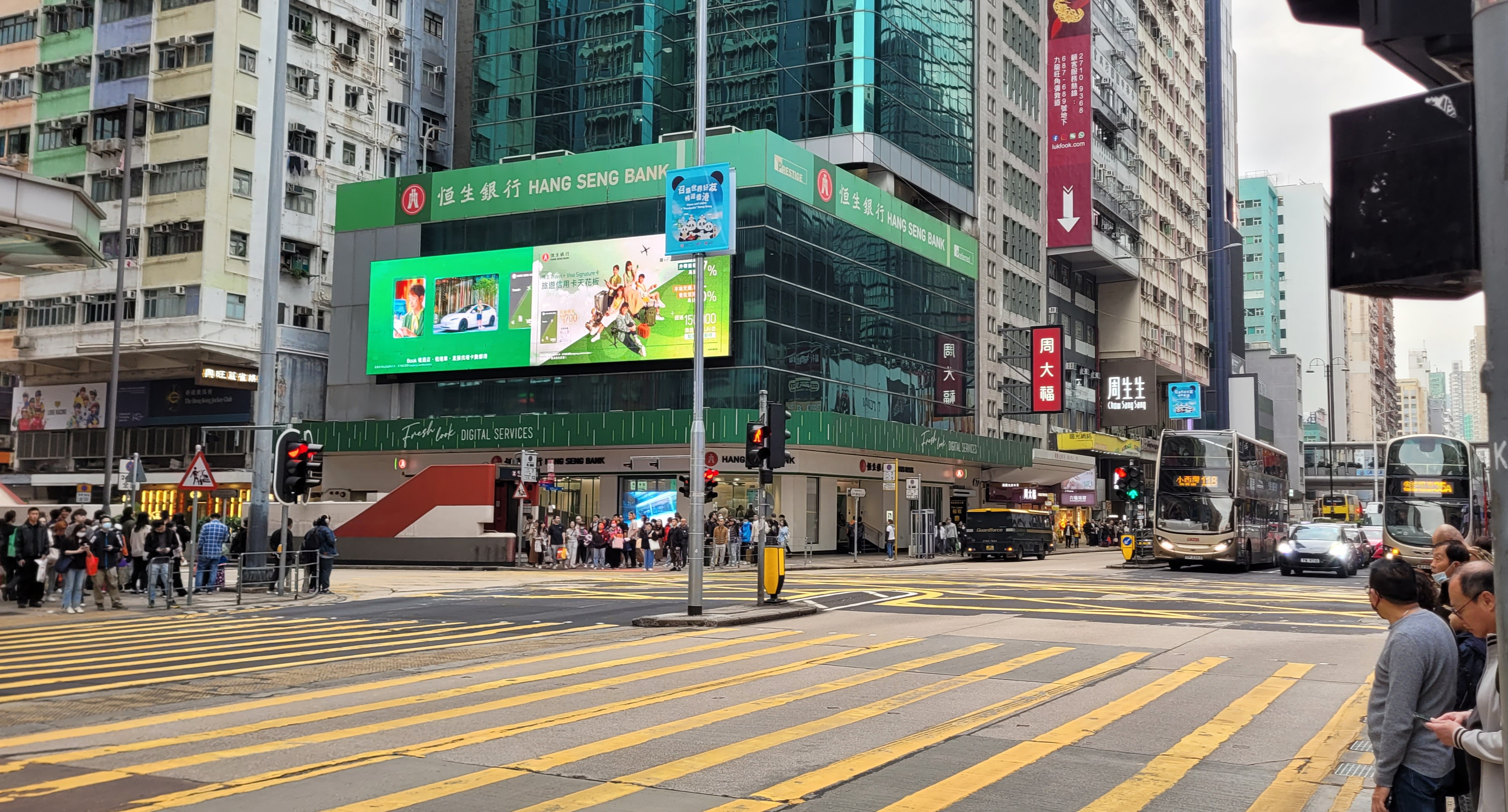
The climactic scene was filmed at the junction of Nathan Road and Argyle Street in Mong Kok

Shooting took place on location at Nathan Road, Kwai Shing Estate, and Kwai Chung Plaza, featuring real pedestrians who interacted with the crew spontaneously. To prepare for the Nathan Road climactic scene, the cast conducted rehearsals using a floor plan at a similar junction in the industrial area of Kowloon Bay, and the scene was shot with two movie cameras and a digital video recorder. The scene depicting YY's suicide on a rooftop was filmed during a signal No. 8 typhoon, as it was the final day the crew had access to the filming location, and they were forced to proceed with the shoot as planned. The crew was stopped by the police at least twice during the production, including while rehearsing the climactic scene in Kowloon Bay, and filming in an alley in Tsim Sha Tsui, where they were found with props like hammers, prompting the police to call for backup with full gear, and the entire crew had their personal details recorded. They were also threatened by the police, with Ren noting that the officers told them the definition of lawbreaking was up to the police and that knowing the law was irrelevant.

=== Post-production ===
May You Stay Forever Young is edited by three editors, including Ren and two anonymous editors who prefer not to be credited by their real names, opting instead for the collective credit "L2". The editing was carried out in a rented studio, which Ren cited as the main reason for the tight post-production timeline. They completed the rough cut within ten days. The film leaned more towards being a drama film in its first cut, serving as a tribute to traditional Hong Kong cinema, which focused solely on the story and included no documentary elements. However, after receiving feedback from friends of the filmmakers, the direction changed starting with the second cut, as they felt the original version was too context-specific, requiring viewers to be familiar with the protests to relate with the plot, making it less appealing to a larger international audience. Filmmaker and Ren's mentor Fruit Chan also offered insights during post-production, recommending that Ren edit the film as a mockumentary, leading to some reshoots and the integration of real footage from the protests into the film. Ren mentioned that he chose not to credit Fruit Chan on the project to "avoid putting him at risk".

The second cut was completed in May 2021, and the final cut was finished in October 2021, just before the submission deadline for the Golden Horse Film Festival. An official trailer was released on 11 October 2021, which featured the text "Cannot be screened in Hong Kong" instead of a release date at the end. The production team travelled to Taiwan in November 2021 to conduct marketing campaigns for the film. Several non-local distributors expressed interest after the production team announced the distribution rights, including Taiwan's Light Year Images, whose executive director House Wang assisted the team while they were shooting promotional photos in Taiwan.

=== Music ===
The film features a score by Macau-based Japanese musician Akitsugu Fukushima, who joined the project at Chan's invitation after watching the first cut and expressing interest in the film. Fukushima worked for a "very low" fee and composed 17 original songs for the crew; however, he and Ren opted not to use too much music to prevent the film's tone from becoming overly dramatic, resulting in fewer than 10 songs being included in the final cut. The theme song, also titled "May You Stay Forever Young" and composed by Fukushima, was released on Facebook prior to the film's premiere.

== Distribution ==
=== Censorship ===
May You Stay Forever Young is banned in Hong Kong. Following the implementation of the Hong Kong national security law in 2020, the Film Censorship Ordinance was amended the following year, allowing the Hong Kong government to ban films that pose potential threats to China's national security. Several local distributors attended test screenings after the first cut and provided positive feedback, but refused to distribute due to political considerations. Golden Scene initially expressed interest in distributing the film before it was banned. (Note: Golden Scene had previously distributed or screened politically controversial films Ten Years (2015) and Lost in the Fumes (2017), as well as documentaries themed around the 2019–2020 Hong Kong protests, including Taking Back the Legislature and Inside the Red Brick Wall (both 2020).) In May 2021, the production team submitted the film to the Office for Film, Newspaper, and Article Administration for review after the second cut based on a recommendation from a local distributor. However, it was not approved and failed to secure a screening permit, due to the restrictions imposed by the updated film ordinance. The film marks the first to be censored under the amended ordinance. Director Lam Sum stated that they did not intend to release the film in mainstream cinemas and were only planning for art-house screenings or private viewings, making the film's censorship unexpected. In July 2022, Rex Ren initiated a joint declaration to criticise film censorship in Hong Kong and to advocate for freedom of filmmaking, alongside other filmmakers whose works had been banned.

The film was also banned in Malaysia by the Film Censorship Board in June 2022, citing concerns that it "glorifies violent protests" and could potentially "affect Malaysia-China bilateral relations".

=== Release ===
May You Stay Forever Young had its world premiere at the 2021 Golden Horse Film Festival on 15 November 2021. Alongside Revolution of Our Times (2021), a documentary also focused on the 2019–2020 Hong Kong protests, tickets for screenings sold out within the first hour of sales on 30 October, prompting additional screenings to be announced on the same day. The film ultimately had a total of ten screenings during the festival from 15 to 28 November. It was also shown as the closing film of the Hong Kong Film Festival UK on 27 March 2022, which featured several other banned films about the protests, organised by a British-based non-profit organisation co-founded by former Hong Kong legislator Nathan Law.

The film was distributed by Light Year Images in Taiwan and received a limited theatrical release in about 20 selected cinemas on 8 April 2022, followed by a special screening held by Amnesty International on 4 June at the Chiang Kai-shek Memorial Hall in Taipei to commemorate the 1989 Tiananmen Square protests and massacre. In July, the film was screened in theatres throughout the San Francisco Bay Area, United States, distributed by the US Hongkongers Club. It had a theatrical release in Japan starting on 10 December, premiering at PolePole Higashi-Nakano in Nakano, Tokyo, and was subsequently released in other prefectures after 24 December, including Osaka and Miyagi.

On 21 December 2024, May You Stay Forever Young was publicly released for free on the official YouTube channel of the film's production company Phone Made Good Film, with the creators citing their decision to release the film online as a show of support for the coinciding Bluebird Movement in Taiwan. Within about two days, it accumulated over 14,000 views, receiving mostly positive comments.

== Themes and styles ==
May You Stay Forever Young centers on the volunteer rescue teams that emerged during the 2019–2020 Hong Kong protests. Director Rex Ren observed that most discussions about the protests focused on conflicts and diverse opinions, and he aimed to create a film about people and stories that have been overlooked, as he found the "value of life" is frequently disregarded amidst the protests. Ren also described the film as a hybrid of drama and documentary, employing a blend of reality and fiction that is reminiscent of 1980s Hong Kong genre films. Lam Sum referenced Ingmar Bergman's Persona (1966) as an inspiration of the film's approach to genre, noting that documentaries often have limitations based on what interviewees disclose, especially under political pressure, whereas drama can transcend these boundaries. Rather than merely creating a positive image for the protest or delivering uplifting messages, Ren opted for a more authentic approach that depicts both the humane aspects of protesters and the ugliness of politics. The production style drew inspiration from the American film Take Out (2004), which was also made on a limited budget and faced production challenges. Documented footage from the protests was incorporated into the film through post-production editing, and several scenes were shot with a hand-held camera to evoke the sensation of a documentary. Ren stated that he aimed to avoid confining the film to a specific artistic style, believing that the messages and spirit of the film should take precedence over formal constraints.

"We don't want it to end with an accusatory note, [the closing scene] is surreal and thoroughly real; at the end, there is hope."

— Rex Ren explaining the creative decision behind the closing scene

The narrative, which revolves around the volunteer team's journey to rescue a suicidal protester, pays tribute to Hong Kong action cinema. Ren noted that the team's efforts to save lives resemble the spirit of Yi found in traditional wuxia films. Writers Liu Wai-tong and Catherine Weng echoed his view, describing the film as reminiscent of a wuxia narrative. Weng mentioned that the volunteers acted solely out of a common motive without seeking reward, while Liu stated that their actions were driven by a sense of righteousness, comparing the plot to the wuxia novel series Qijian Xia Tianshan by Liang Yusheng, where a diverse cast of characters share a unified commitment to honour. Ren also incorporated multiple coincidences into the story to strengthen dramatic tension, (Note: Notable coincidences include YY dropping the doll in the alley where Nam and Bell are chatting, Ho arriving on the rooftop to join the persuasion efforts to prevent YY from committing suicide, and Fai revealing his family background at the cha chaan teng where the volunteer team dined.) describing them as "heaven's will". Because of these coincidences, Liu viewed the film as more of a surrealist work that requires metaphorical interpretation, particularly in the closing scene depicting multiple hands pulling the suicidal protester back, which he interpreted as a symbol of unity. Weng found this scene contrasts with the overall tone and themes of helplessness and despair, ultimately delivering an uplifting message of hope and ambition, while political scientist Wu Rwei-ren also observed that the scene encourages the youth of Hong Kong to remain hopeful, similarly to the Taiwanese works during the White Terror. Ren explained that he sought to emulate Fruit Chan's Made in Hong Kong (1997) and use film as a medium to convey messages, stating that the production team debated whether the outcome of the protester's survival or death would lead to themes of desperation or hope. Ultimately, they chose the surrealistic approach to avoid making the film feel accusatory and to convey a more positive message.

Film critic David Chan (who is also an associate producer of May You Stay Forever Young) referred the film, along with other censored films such as Revolution of Our Times, Drifting Pedals (both 2021), and Blue Island (2022), as "a new type of Hong Kong film", which present the true political atmosphere in Hong Kong in contrast to mainstream cinema. Ren also compared the film to the Hong Kong New Wave in the 1980s and 1990s, noting that political censorship marks the beginning of this new wave of works that allow filmmakers to reflect on and redefine Hong Kong cinema, which is reminiscent of the Chinese film censorship in the 1990s that led to a variety of films rich in social commentary. Pony Ma of United Daily News found these "films outside of institutions" to be a product of tightening censorship, where increasing oppression prompts even greater resistance for creative freedom, and the growing number of these films has impacted the recognition of current Hong Kong mainstream cinema and the film industry. Film scholar Enoch Tam used May You Stay Forever Young as an example to illustrate how Hong Kong authorities attempt to regulate the dispositif, allowing only a single voice "entrenched in the state apparatus". This has led to the deterritorialisation of these "forbidden films", cultivating alliances outside of the diminishing dispositif and turning to international screenings, ultimately appealing to a much larger audience that embraces creativity.

== Reception ==
The critical response of May You Stay Forever Young was generally regarded as positive. Citizen News described the film as receiving "universal praise" from Taiwanese critics; while Commons referred to the film as "winning widespread acclaim".

James Au of The Stand News described the film as "emotionally delicate", acknowledging its limited budget while commending the chroma keying scenes for their cost-effectiveness, aesthetic appeal, and creativity, particularly the well-developed and realistic character arcs that culminate in a touching ending. Similarly, Ryan Cheng of PTS News, who named the film "his favourite Sinophone film of 2021", recognised its lack of industry maturity due to budget constraints and "overly functional" dialogues, while also complimenting the production team's dedication and on how its rawness and imperfections reflect the characters' turmoil, ultimately conveying a powerful message about the "spirit of creative freedom and resistance" among youth in the context of social movements. Chan Tsz-wan, reviewing for Hong Kong Inmedia, characterised the film as "extremely profound" and "deeply moving" with a deeper philosophical framework that echoes Emmanuel Levinas's ideas, while also addressing the controversial subject matter to remind Hong Kongers of the protests and encourage them not to lose themselves in political pressure.

Arstin Chen, writing for The News Lens, called the film "a courageous work", praising the character arcs of Mr. Burnism and YY, whose experiences resonate deeply with many young protesters in Hong Kong, while finding the film's positive message of remaining hopeful to be profoundly moving. Lee Sze-fung of Crossing also lauded the film for its "authentic" portrayal of the protesters' diverse emotions under bureaucracy, noting that despite some narrative flaws, the dialogues were "touching the wounds deep in the heart", and the reflection on the collective aspiration of the young protesters to protect their city during the 2019 protests was emotionally compelling. While in Liu Wai-tong's review for Up Media, he compared the film to Ten Years (2015), praising its rich use of metaphors in the story, dialogue, and cinematography, while asserting that despite its "too many coincidences" and "too one-dimensional" ending, its artistic elements and thematic depth overshadow these shortcomings.

However, the screenplay was reviewed unfavourably. Funscreen Weekly's Jay Wei offered a mixed review, praising the production team's efforts to authentically recreate the protests with excellent editing, cinematography, and sound design, as well as the diverse characters that break tropes of protesters, but noted that the story and character development were lacking, resulting in unmotivated characters that failed to explore the film's themes about the struggles of Hong Kong protesters, rendering it a form of "seeking spiritual victory" and missing the opportunity to effectively present the protests through media. Chou Sheng-kai expressed a similar opinion in his piece for The News Lens, noting that while the film effectively portrays the confusion of the young protesters, it fails to explore political ethics and overly glorified characters, presenting a "poorly developed" and excessively emotional narrative that "interprets the protests in a superficial manner", ultimately deeming the film overrated solely because of its subject matter.

Meanwhile, the film was criticised by pro-Beijing newspapers. State-owned Wen Wei Po condemned the film as "a violation of the Hong Kong national security law" and stated that Rex Ren and Lam Sum had repeatedly undermined the laws.

== Awards and nominations ==
Year	Award	Category	Nominee	Result	Ref.
2021	58th Golden Horse Awards	Best New Director	Rex Ren, Lam Sum	Nominated	
2021	58th Golden Horse Awards	Best Film Editing	Rex Ren, L2	Nominated	
2021	58th Golden Horse Awards	NETPAC Award	—N/a	Won	
2021	58th Golden Horse Awards	FIPRESCI Award	—N/a	Nominated	
