= Chan Tze-woon =

Hong Kong filmmaker (born 1989)

Chan Tze-woon (born 1989) is an independent documentary filmmaker from Hong Kong. His works focus on Hong Kong's social movements and historical memory, using film to document the changing times and the emotional journeys of protesters. His works include Yellowing and Blue Island.

== Biography ==
Chan Tze-woon graduated from the Hong Kong Baptist University’s Academy of Film in 2013. His graduation project, The Aqueous Truth, was a mockumentary that hypothesized the government secretly adding sedatives to the city’s water supply to suppress extreme protest sentiments. The film explored Hong Kong citizens' political apathy and blind belief in authority.

His 2014 work, Being Rain: Representation and Will, another mockumentary, imagined the government using artificial rain to deter public demonstrations. Filmed during significant moments such as the 6.22 Civil Referendum and the July 1st march, the fictional storyline inevitably evoked associations with the invisible obstacles faced during the 2014 Umbrella Movement.

Shortly after graduation, Chan found himself amid the 2014 Umbrella Movement. For 97 days, he closely followed and documented the experiences of its participants. His first feature documentary, Yellowing, offered a first-person perspective into the movement, capturing the emotions and reflections of those involved. The film was nominated for Best Documentary at the Golden Horse Awards and won the prestigious Ogawa Shinsuke Prize at the Yamagata International Documentary Film Festival in Japan.

In 2017, Chan began working on Blue Island, a hybrid documentary blending real-life footage with dramatized reenactments to explore the struggles of different generations of protesters. During its production, he once again took to the streets to document history as it unfolded, capturing the pivotal moments of the 2019 Anti-Extradition Bill Movement. The film won 3 awards at the Taiwan International Documentary Festival and was once again nominated for Best Documentary at the Golden Horse Awards.

Despite the shifting political landscape and tightening creative restrictions, Chan remains committed to using film as a means of chronicling history. He believes that "the more the regime seeks to suppress our imagination, the more we must envision the possibility of a better future." His works not only document Hong Kong’s protests but also reflect the resilience and convictions of its creators.

== Films ==
- The Aqueous Truth (2013)
- Being Rain: Representation and Will (2014)
- Yellowing (2016)
- Blue Island (2022)
