= Inside the Red Brick Wall =

2020 Hong Kong documentary

- Chinese: 理大圍城
- Directed by: "Hong Kong Documentary Filmmakers"
- Distributed by: Ying e Chi
- Release date: January 2020
- Running time: 88 minutes
- Country: Hong Kong
- Language: Cantonese

"Inside the Red Brick Wall" (Chinese: 理大圍城) is an 88-minute Hong Kong documentary that chronicles the large-scale clashes between police and protesters at the Hong Kong Polytechnic University Hung Hom campus in November 2019 during the anti-extradition bill movement. The documentary won the "Best Editing Award" at the International Documentary Film Festival Amsterdam (IDFA) and the "Best Film Award" from the Hong Kong Film Critics Society. It was also selected as the opening film for the 12th Taiwan International Documentary Festival (TIDF) and won the Chinese Documentary Award, along with Taking Back the Legislature.

== Production crew ==
The documentary was created by a group of filmmakers who worked anonymously under the collective name "Hong Kong Documentary Filmmakers" to avoid potential arrest. To protect their identities, they concealed their real names. They also refrained from informing their families about their involvement to prevent causing them worry. In the event of winning an award, they had arranged for the distributor, Ying e Chi, to accept the award and deliver the acceptance speech on their behalf.

== Content ==
"Inside the Red Brick Wall" unfolds chronologically, documenting key moments and struggles of protesters during the November 2019 clashes at Hong Kong Polytechnic University. The documentary captures events such as:

- November 17: Police surrounded and sealed off the campus, deploying water cannons and armored vehicles to target protesters, who responded with petrol bombs and bricks.
- November 18 (early morning): Special Tactical Squad officers stormed the university's main gate, leading to scenes of protesters burning barricades at the entrance. Protesters' attempts to leave the campus were thwarted by tear gas and violent arrests.
- Protesters sought to ease the siege by initiating a strategy called "blossoming everywhere" in Kowloon, aiming to divert police forces, but many participants, including the injured and bystanders, were eventually arrested.
- November 18 (evening): A group of secondary school principals entered the university to persuade protesters to leave, causing hesitation and debate among the protesters. As some students exited with the principals, others berated them, calling them "educational beasts," blaming them for jeopardizing the students' futures.
- Some protesters attempted to escape through the sewer system but abandoned the plan due to insufficient chemical knowledge.
- As days passed, protesters faced worsening conditions, including shortages of food and drinking water and a deteriorating campus environment.

Amid growing fear and despair, many protesters were ultimately forced to leave the campus, resulting in their arrests.

== Events ==
"Inside the Red Brick Wall" is a documentary that captures a major social event at Hong Kong Polytechnic University in November 2019. During the anti-extradition bill movement, large-scale clashes erupted between protesters and the Hong Kong police near the university. On November 17, protesters were surrounded by police on campus, with water and food supplies cut off and all entrances and exits blocked. The police prohibited access to the area, and the siege lasted until November 28, resulting in the arrest of many protesters.

=== 2020 Hong Kong Independent Film Festival premiere ===
From January 10 to 22, 2020, the 13th Hong Kong Independent Film Festival featured the premieres of "Inside the Red Brick Wall" and "Taking Back the Legislature".

=== Film classification as Category III ===
In July 2020, following the enactment of the Hong Kong National Security Law, "Inside the Red Brick Wall" faced intense scrutiny during its Hong Kong release. The Office for Film, Newspaper, and Article Administration (OFNAA) required warnings to be displayed before the screening, including statements such as “may constitute a criminal offense under existing laws” and “some content or commentary may be unverified or misleading.”

On September 21, 2020, just two hours before its scheduled screening at the Hong Kong Arts Centre, the distributor received OFNAA’s approval, which reclassified the documentary as a Category III film, restricting viewers under 18 years old. This led to last-minute ticket refunds for affected audiences.

=== Damaged DVD incident ===
A DVD submitted for review by the distributor Ying e Chi was returned broken into pieces. Ying e Chi expressed shock and criticized OFNAA for failing to provide a detailed explanation for the damage. OFNAA claimed the damage was due to "staff negligence," sparking public outrage and accusations of intimidation and unprofessionalism.

=== Cancellation of screenings due to political pressure ===
In March 2021, Golden Scene Cinema planned to screen "Inside the Red Brick Wall" on March 15 and March 21. On March 11, around 70 people queued outside the cinema to purchase tickets. However, the pro-Beijing newspaper Wen Wei Po published an editorial accusing the documentary of spreading "anti-national sentiments" and violating the Film Censorship Ordinance and the National Security Law, urging OFNAA to ban it.

On March 15, Golden Scene Cinema abruptly canceled the screenings, citing the need to “avoid unnecessary misunderstandings.” Similarly, the Hong Kong Arts Centre canceled three supplementary screenings scheduled for March 16 to 18, calling the decision "very difficult."

=== Opening film at the Taiwan International Documentary Festival (TIDF) ===
The 12th TIDF took place from April 30 to May 9, 2021, with venues in Taipei's Shin Kong Cinemas, Spot Huashan Cinema, and the Taiwan Contemporary Culture Lab. "Inside the Red Brick Wall" was chosen as the festival's opening film.

== Awards ==
- Best Editing Award – IDFA (2020)

On November 27, 2020, "Inside the Red Brick Wall" won the "Best Editing Award" at the International Documentary Film Festival Amsterdam (IDFA). The jury praised the film, stating it "transforms into a universal story about a small group courageously facing a powerful authority through its writing and editing excellence."

- Best Film Award – Hong Kong Film Critics Society Awards (2021)

In January 2021, the film received the "Best Film Award" at the 27th Hong Kong Film Critics Society Awards. The critics commended the production team for their calm and rational approach, highlighting the protesters' anguish and struggles during the siege. The documentary was celebrated for its narrative and aesthetic qualities, marking a new milestone for Hong Kong documentaries.

- Robert and Frances Flaherty Prize – Yamagata International Documentary Film Festival (2021)

In October 2021, "Inside the Red Brick Wall" was awarded the Robert and Frances Flaherty Prize in the International Competition category at the Yamagata International Documentary Film Festival, the festival's highest honor. This marked the first time since the award's establishment of over 30 years ago that a Hong Kong film won this prestigious award.
