= Taking Back the Legislature =

2020 Hong Kong documentary

- Poster of Taking back the Legislature distributed by Ying e Chi
- Directed by: "Hong Kong Documentary Filmmakers"
- Distributed by: Ying e Chi
- Release date: January 2020
- Running time: ~46 minutes
- Language: Cantonese

Taking Back the Legislature (Chinese: 佔領立法會) is a Hong Kong documentary, approximately 46 minutes long, that records the unprecedented occupation of the Legislative Council on July 1, 2019. It is a sister work to the documentary Inside the Red Brick Wall. In 2020, it was nominated for Best Documentary at the 57th Golden Horse Awards in Taiwan. On May 6, 2021, both this film and Inside the Red Brick Wall won the Chinese Documentary Award at the 12th Taiwan International Documentary Festival.

== Plot ==
The documentary follows a chronological narrative, capturing the first-ever occupation of the Hong Kong Legislative Council on July 1, 2019. The filmmakers closely followed frontline participants, presenting an immersive perspective on their emotional responses throughout the operation. It documents the protesters' discussions, actions, withdrawal, and the final police clearance, depicting the emotional highs and lows—from the exhilaration of successfully entering the Legislative Council to the helplessness of having to retreat. The film concludes with police clearing the area, deploying tear gas multiple times on Lung Wui Road and Lung Wo Road, before regaining control of the Legislative Council Complex.

== Production ==
The documentary was created by a group of filmmakers who worked anonymously under the collective name Hong Kong Documentary Filmmakers to avoid potential arrest. To protect their identities, they concealed their real names. They also refrained from informing their families about their involvement to prevent causing them worry. In the event of winning an award, they had arranged for the distributor, Ying e Chi, to accept the award and deliver the acceptance speech on their behalf.

== Release ==
From January 10 to 22, 2020, the 13th Hong Kong Independent Film Festival was held, where Taking Back the Legislature and Inside the Red Brick Wall premiered.

In July 2020, after the enactment of the Hong Kong National Security Law, both documentaries faced obstacles from the Film Censorship Authority when being screened in Hong Kong. Taking Back the Legislature and Inside the Red Brick Wall were originally scheduled to be shown at Louis Koo Cinema in the Hong Kong Arts Centre on September 21 and 22, 2020. However, the Office for Film, Newspaper, and Article Administration (OFNAA) required warning messages to be added before the screenings, stating that "some content or comments may not be verified or could be misleading" and that "certain content may constitute a criminal offense under existing laws." The distributor, Ying e Chi, only received the certification from OFNAA two hours before the first screening on September 21.

The film was screened at Louis Koo Cinema in the Hong Kong Arts Centre on October 17, 18, 21, 22, 24, and November 3 and 4, 2020, totaling nine screenings (two screenings per day on October 17 and 18, and one per day on the other dates). Ticket sales began on October 14, and within less than two hours, all approximately 700 tickets for the nine screenings were sold out. Many online users even urged the distributor to arrange additional screenings.

== Accolades ==
Year	Ceremony	Category	Nominee(s)	Result	Ref.
2020	57th Golden Horse Awards	Best Documentary	—N/a	Nominated	
