= Golden Horse Award for Best Documentary Feature =

Award for documentary films

- Location: Taiwan
- Presented by: Taipei Golden Horse Film Festival Executive Committee
- First award: 1962
- Currently held by: From Island to Island (2024)
- Website: www.goldenhorse.org.tw

The Golden Horse Award for Best Documentary Feature is presented annually at the Taipei Golden Horse Film Awards. Since 2018, winners have been eligible to submit for consideration for the Academy Award for Best Documentary Feature Film.

== Winners and nominees ==
Year	English Title	Original Title	Director(s)	Production Country
2015 (52nd)	The Chinese Mayor	大同	Zhou Hao	(China)
2015 (52nd)	32 and 4	32+4	Chan Hau Chun	(Hong Kong)
2015 (52nd)	On the Rim of the Sky	明天會更好	Xu Hongjie	(China)
2015 (52nd)	The Verse of Us	我的詩篇	Felix Wu and Qin Xiaoyu	(China)
2015 (52nd)	Wansei Back Home	灣生回家	Huang Ming-cheng	(Taiwan)
2016 (53rd)
2016 (53rd)	Le Moulin	日曜日式散步者	Huang Ya Li	(Taiwan)
2016 (53rd)	Yellowing	亂世備忘	Chan Tze-woon	(Hong Kong)
2016 (53rd)	Small Talk	日常對話	Huang Hui-chen	(Taiwan)
2016 (53rd)	The Road	大路朝天	Zhang Zanbo	(China)
2016 (53rd)	City of Jade	翡翠之城	Midi Z	(Taiwan) (Myanmar)
2017 (54th)
2017 (54th)	Mama	羅長姐	Jin Xingzheng	(China)
2017 (54th)	Inmates	囚	Ma Li	(China)
2017 (54th)	Plastic China	塑料王國	Wang Jiu-liang	(China)
2017 (54th)	Condemned	徐自強的練習題	Chi Yueh-chun	(Taiwan)
2017 (54th)	Looking For?	你找什麼？	Chou Tung-yen	(Taiwan)
2018 (55th)
2018 (55th)	Our Youth in Taiwan	我們的青春，在台灣	Fu Yue	(Taiwan)
2018 (55th)	Four Springs	四個春天	Lu Qing-yi	(China)
2018 (55th)	Late Life: The Chien-Ming Wang Story	後勁：王建民	Frank W Chen	(United States)
2018 (55th)	24th Street	24號大街	Pan Zhi-qi	(China)
2018 (55th)	Umbrella Diaries: The First Umbrella	傘上：遍地開花	James Leong	(Hong Kong)
2019 (56th)	Your Face	你的臉	Tsai Ming-liang	(Taiwan)
2019 (56th)	The Tree Remembers	還有一些樹	Lau Kek-huat	(Taiwan)
2019 (56th)	The Good Daughter	阿紫	Frank W Chen	(Taiwan)
2019 (56th)	Bamboo Theatre	戲棚	Cheung Cheuk	(Hong Kong)
2019 (56th)	L'An dernier quand le train passait	去年火車經過的時候	Huang Pang-Chuan	(Taiwan) (France)
2020 (57th)	Lost Course	迷航	Jill Li	(Hong Kong)
2020 (57th)	Taking back the Legislature	佔領立法會	Hong Kong Documentary Filmmakers	(Hong Kong)
2020 (57th)	Father	爺爺和父親	DENG Wei	(China)
2020 (57th)	Me and My Condemned Son	我的兒子是死刑犯	Pan Zhi-qi	(Taiwan)
2020 (57th)	Chen Uen	千年一問	WANG Wan-jo	(Taiwan)
2021 (58th)	Revolution of Our Times	時代革命	Kiwi Chow	(Hong Kong)
2021 (58th)	A Letter to A'ma	給阿媽的一封信	CHEN Hui-ling	(Taiwan)
2021 (58th)	Solo Dancer	獨舞者的樂章	LEE Li-shao	(Taiwan)
2021 (58th)	RAIN IN 2020	二〇二〇年的一場雨	LEE Yong-chao	(Taiwan) (Myanmar)
2021 (58th)	Dark Red Forest	絳紅森林	Jin Huaqing	(China)
2022 (59th)
2022 (59th)	And Miles to Go Before I Sleep	九槍	Tsai Tsung-lung	(Taiwan)
2022 (59th)	Silence in the Dust	塵默呼吸	Li Wei	(China) (Singapore) (France) (United States)
2022 (59th)	A Holy Family	神人之家	Elvis Lu	(Taiwan) (France)
2022 (59th)	The King of Wuxia	大俠胡金銓	Lin Jing-jie	(Taiwan)
2022 (59th)	Blue Island	憂鬱之島	Chan Tze-woon	(Hong Kong)
2023 (60th)	Youth (Spring)	青春（春）	Wang Bing	(France) (Luxembourg) (Netherlands)
2023 (60th)	Elegies	詩	Ann Hui	(Hong Kong)
2023 (60th)	Where	何處	Tsai Ming-liang	(Taiwan)
2023 (60th)	Free Beats: The Musical Journey of Chen Ming Chang	撼山河 撼向世界	Lin Cheng-sheng	(Taiwan)
2023 (60th)	The Clinic	診所	Midi Z	(Taiwan) (Myanmar)
2024 (61st)	From Island to Island	由島至島	Lau Kek-huat	(Taiwan)
2024 (61st)	After the Snowmelt	雪水消融的季節	Lo Yi-shan	(Taiwan) (Japan)
2024 (61st)	XiXi	曦曦	Wu Fan	(Taiwan) (Philippines) (South Korea)
2024 (61st)	Soul of Soil	種土	Yen Lan-chuan	(Taiwan)
2024 (61st)	Youth (Hard Times)	青春（苦）	Wang Bing	(France) (Luxembourg) (Netherlands)

Note: There were no Golden Horse Film Awards held in 1964 or 1974.

== See also ==
- Academy Award for Best Documentary Feature Film
- Asia Pacific Screen Award for Best Documentary Film
- BAFTA Award for Best Documentary
- César Award for Best Documentary Film
- European Film Award for Best Documentary
- L'Œil d'or
