= Edward Leung =

Hong Kong politician and activist (born 1991)

- 梁天琦
- Leung in 2015

Spokesman of Hong Kong Indigenous
- In office January 2015 – 18 December 2017

Personal details
- Born: 2 June 1991 (age 35) Wuhan, Hubei, China
- Party: Hong Kong Indigenous
- Education: Shung Tak Catholic English College
- Alma mater: University of Hong Kong (BA)
- Occupation: Politician
- Known for: Hong Kong independence 2016 Mong Kok civil unrest

Chinese name
- Chinese: 梁天琦
Transcriptions
Standard Mandarin
- Hanyu Pinyin: Liáng Tiānqí
Yue: Cantonese
- Yale Romanization: Lèuhng Tīn kèih
- Jyutping: Loeng^{4} Tin^{1}-kei^{4}

Edward Leung Tin-kei (Chinese: 梁天琦; born 2 June 1991) is a Hong Kong politician and activist. He is the former spokesperson of Hong Kong Indigenous, a localist group. He advocates Hong Kong independence, and coined the slogan "Liberate Hong Kong, revolution of our times" during the 2016 by-election, which was later widely used in 2019–2020 Hong Kong protests.

Leung contested the 2016 New Territories East Legislative Council by-election, representing Hong Kong Indigenous. In February 2016, he was arrested in the Mong Kok civil unrest, but despite that his popularity rose. In the election, he received more than 66,000 votes, around 15 per cent of total votes. This led the Hong Kong government to require future candidates a written declaration to confirm their political stance. Leung signed the declaration, giving up his pro-independence stance in the 2016 Hong Kong Legislative Council election in September. He was barred from running in the election because the electoral officer was not convinced by his declaration.

In December 2017, he resigned from his position as spokesperson of Hong Kong Indigenous. In the same year, Lost in the Fumes, an award-winning documentary based on his story, was released. In June 2018, he was convicted of rioting and assaulting a police officer during the Mong Kok unrest and sentenced to jail for six years. In 2019, a jury reached a verdict of not guilty in his trial for rioting in Portland Street, Mong Kok.

Leung served four years of his sentence in maximum-security prison, before his early release in early 2022 for good behaviour.

In 2019, Leung was recognised by Time magazine on its 100 Next, a list of rising stars expected to shape the future. The magazine called him a spiritual leader of the 2019 Hong Kong protests, which is a leaderless movement.

== Early life ==
Edward Leung was born into a wealthy family in Wuhan, Hubei, China. He moved to Hong Kong at the age of one with his mother. His great-grandfather was killed by the Chinese Communist Party and his properties were confiscated. Leung's grandfather studied in British Hong Kong, later returned to Shanghai to study Economic Management at Shanghai Institute of Finance and Economics (now Shanghai University of Finance and Economics). In 1953, Leung's grandfather graduated from the university, and was allocated to work in Xinjiang Province Bureau of Mine for seven years, later resided in Zhuhai.

In 1979, the rehabilitation policy after Cultural Revolution returned the previously confiscated properties to Leung's family. In Summer 1990, Leung's father met his wife in Wuhan, the couple registered in Wuhan and Leung's mother resigned her job shortly after. On 2 June 1991, Leung was born in Hubei Province. In the following year, Leung followed his mother to reside in Hong Kong. In 2000, Leung's parents invested in restaurants in Wuhan, but took a loss due to SARS and Avian Influenza.

Leung's father was a college teacher with expertise in Chinese history, Chinese language and Buddhism. He had a strong interest in contemporary Chinese history and taught Leung histories of Hong Kong and world history. Leung's mother worked as a housewife after moving to Hong Kong and later worked as a tutor, teaching Leung literacy.

== Social movement ==
When Leung was young, he questioned the rationale behind political events such as the Handover of Hong Kong in 1997 and the yearly Hong Kong 1 July marches in 2003. His parents were excited with these events and explained to Leung about their meanings. He completed his college studies at Shung Tak Catholic English College in Yuen Long District. In 2008, aged 17, for the first time he participated in memorials for the 1989 Tiananmen Square protests and 1 July marches. He then realised Hong Kong people protest to pursuit democracy and felt touched with their passion to preserve the truth of history.

In the same year, Leung started to participate in various social movements, and felt proud of driving the society forward. He studied at the University of Hong Kong, majoring in Philosophy with a minor in Politics and Public Administration, and graduated with a Bachelor of Arts in 2016. He felt disappointed with the Hong Kong government ignoring the will of people, forcibly passing the Express Rail Grant and postponing the implementation of dual universal suffrage.

He was a member of Ricci Hall, HKU and led its development actively. In his third year, he was elected as the president of Ricci Hall Student Association, HKU, and led the Hall to win HKU Sports Championship ──Malayan Cup. In Summer 2014, People's Republic of China has passed the "831 decision" and White paper, this led him to believe that the HKSAR government had decided to ignore the promise made in Sino-British Joint Declaration. In September 2014, Umbrella Revolution erupted, besides part-timing in an art gallery and studying, Leung spent most of his time joining the movement. On 30 November, Leung and a group of protesters occupied the Central Government Complex, in response to the call from Hong Kong Federation of Students and Scholarism. After facing clearance from Hong Kong Police Special Tactical Squad, he believed occupational movements could not lead to changes. His graduation was delayed to 2016.

== Political involvement ==
In 2015, Localist camp Hong Kong Indigenous was founded, to support street hawkers near districts of Sham Shui Po and Mong Kok. In March 2015, under the referral from his classmate, Leung met Ray Wong, another political activist, but was unable to join Hong Kong Indigenous. Based on their common ideology, Leung was invited to be the spokesperson of the aforementioned group. Leung and Wong founded "Channel i" on October of the same year, acting as shareholder and CEO.

=== 2016 New Territories East by-election and Mong Kok unrest ===
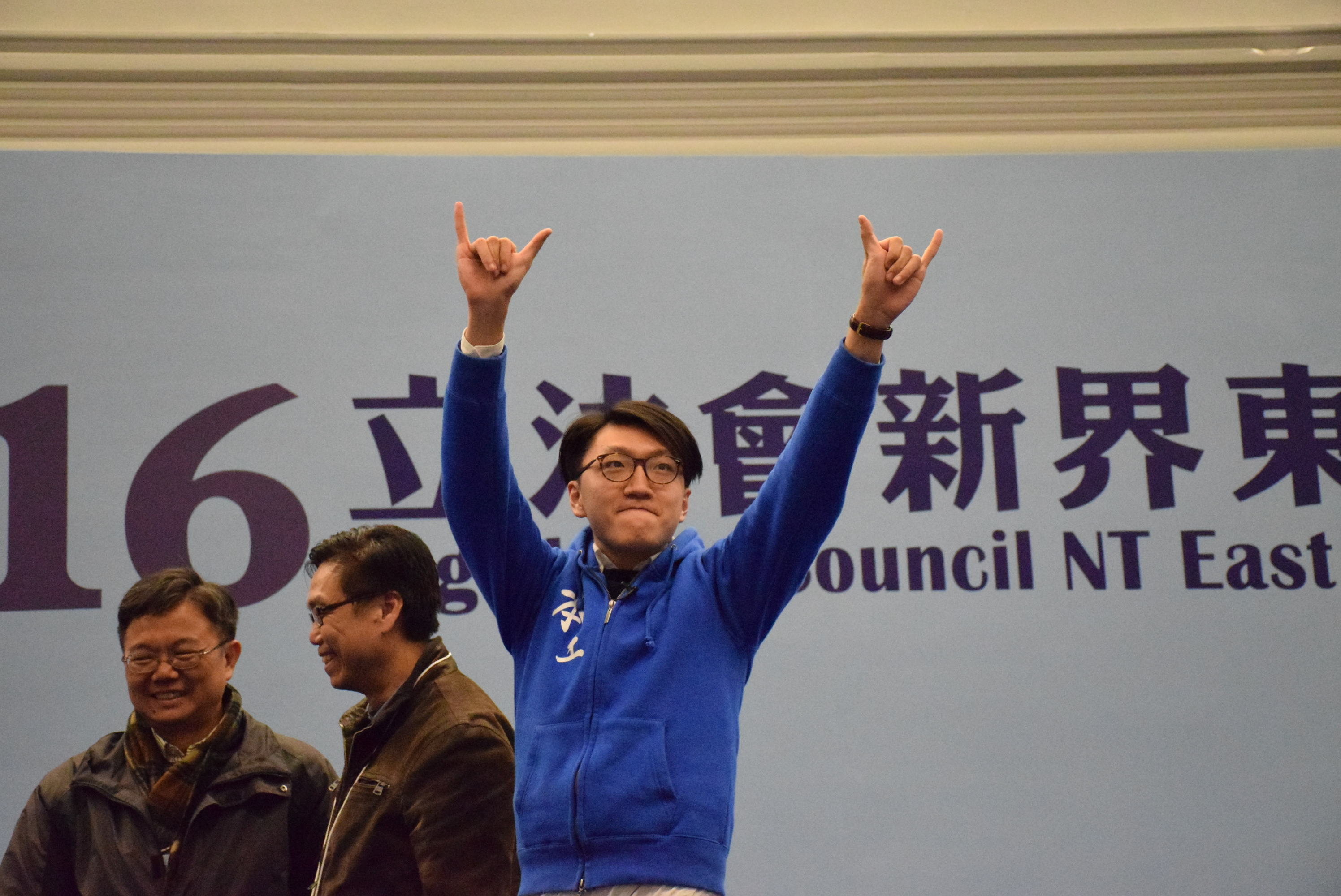
Leung after the polling of the 2016 by-election.

In December 2015, Leung decided to participate 2016 New Territories East by-election, with the aim of promoting Localism ideology, testing his approval rate, and encouraging young politicians. On 15 January 2016, Leung was nominated to represent Hong Kong Indigenous to run for New Territories East by-election, and was endorsed by Youngspiration, another localist group. But the public was not confident that Leung would have enough votes to even retrieve election deposit. Leung organized a small election parade in Sheung Shui, to explain the social problems brought by parallel importers, and was not interfered by the police.

In February 2016, two street vendors were arrested. At 8pm on 8 February, Food and Environmental Hygiene Department officers attempted to drive away street vendors in Mong Kok, Leung and Hong Kong Indigenous members assisted vendors to move to Portland Street, while calling help from social network to protect vendors, the solidarity at midnight elevated to civil unrest between protesters and the police. In order to protect the protesters, Leung announced election parade during the riot and refused to leave. People gathered at Mong Kok streets and committed arson at Nathan Road, confronting riot police.

Leung and 20 other Hong Kong Indigenous members were later arrested by police at Mong Kok. However, Leung received supports from other political organizations and activists such as Youngspiration, Civic Passion, LegCo councilor Wong Yuk-man, Chin Wan. They helped Leung to set up street election stations, while comparatively, Electoral Affairs Commission claims that wordings such as "Autonomy", 'Independence" violated Hong Kong Basic Law, and refused to mail Leung's promotional letter. On 28 February, Leung lost the by-election with 66,524 votes(15.3%), behind Alvin Yeung (160,880 votes) and Holden Chow (150,329 votes).

=== Barred from running in 2016 Legislative Council election ===
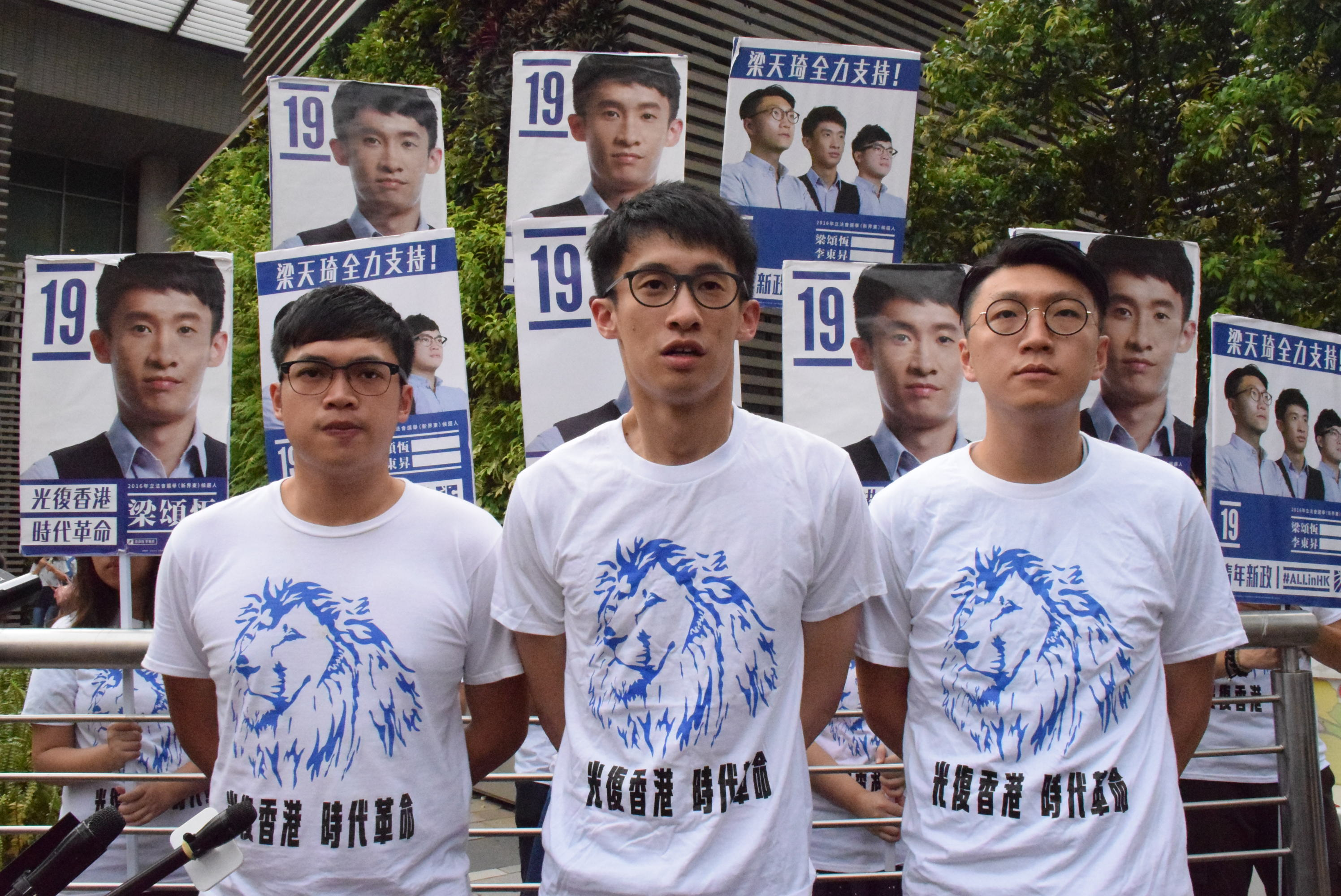
Edward Leung and Baggio Leung thanked voters' supports in September 2016.

After the by-election, Leung decided to participate in the 2016 Hong Kong Legislative Council election. At that time, Leung and Ray Wong were invited to join InterEthnic InterFaith Leadership Conference in Dharamshala, India, organized by 14th Dalai Lama. Leung and Dalai Lama held a meeting at Jokhang for two hours, the latter encourage Hong Kong people to persevere.

In July 2016, Electoral Affairs Commission released new election measures, directed against activists with Hong Kong Independence stance, requiring all candidates to sign declarations to confirm their support to Basic Law, and Hong Kong is an inseparable part of China as stated in the Basic Law.

Leung applied to elect for New Territories East District, and initially refused to sign the declaration and asked for judicial review. On 22 July, Leung received an email from Electoral Affairs Commission, asking clarification on Leung's pro-Independence political stance.

For this, Leung and Avery Ng sought judicial review with the High Court, claiming Electoral Affairs Commission has acted in excess of their authority, criticizing HKSAR Government's political censorship. However, the judges ruled that there was no urgency before the end of nomination and refused to approve judicial review immediately. Leung eventually decided to sign the declaration, claiming to support the Hong Kong Basic Law and declaring loyalty to HKSAR, and no longer advocating independence.

In the end, six allegedly pro-independence nominees, including Leung and Hong Kong National Party convener Chan Ho-tin, were disqualified by the committee, the reason being the returning officer refused to believe their claims were genuine. On 5 August, Leung and 2,500 pro-independence supporters rallied, claiming it was the first rally supporting Hong Kong Independence.

== Aftermath ==
In August 2016, Leung uploaded a video on Facebook, claiming he had been tracked for a month. Facebook quickly deleted the video and barred Leung's account from posting for 24 hours when Leung attempted to re-upload it. On 15 August, Leung was stalked by Ta Kung Pao reporters. Leung photographed the stalker and conflict occurred in Tai Koo Station, police arrived and filed the case as dispute, later changed to public fighting because the stalker claimed that Leung had assaulted him.

Meanwhile, Ta Kung Pao continuously dug information on Leung's background, including his birthplace and ancestry. In September, Leung and Ray Wong participated in Seventh International Conference of Tibet Support Groups, organized in Brussels, Belgium. Leung revealed he would submit an election petition when the election results were published on Hong Kong Government Gazette, On 7 October, Leung submitted the election petition on his disqualification.

On the other hand, Leung was charged of rioting and inciting riot after the Mong Kok civil unrest. On 18 December 2017, Hong Kong Indigenous issued a statement, announcing Leung has resigned his membership and spokesperson duty.

=== Imprisonment ===
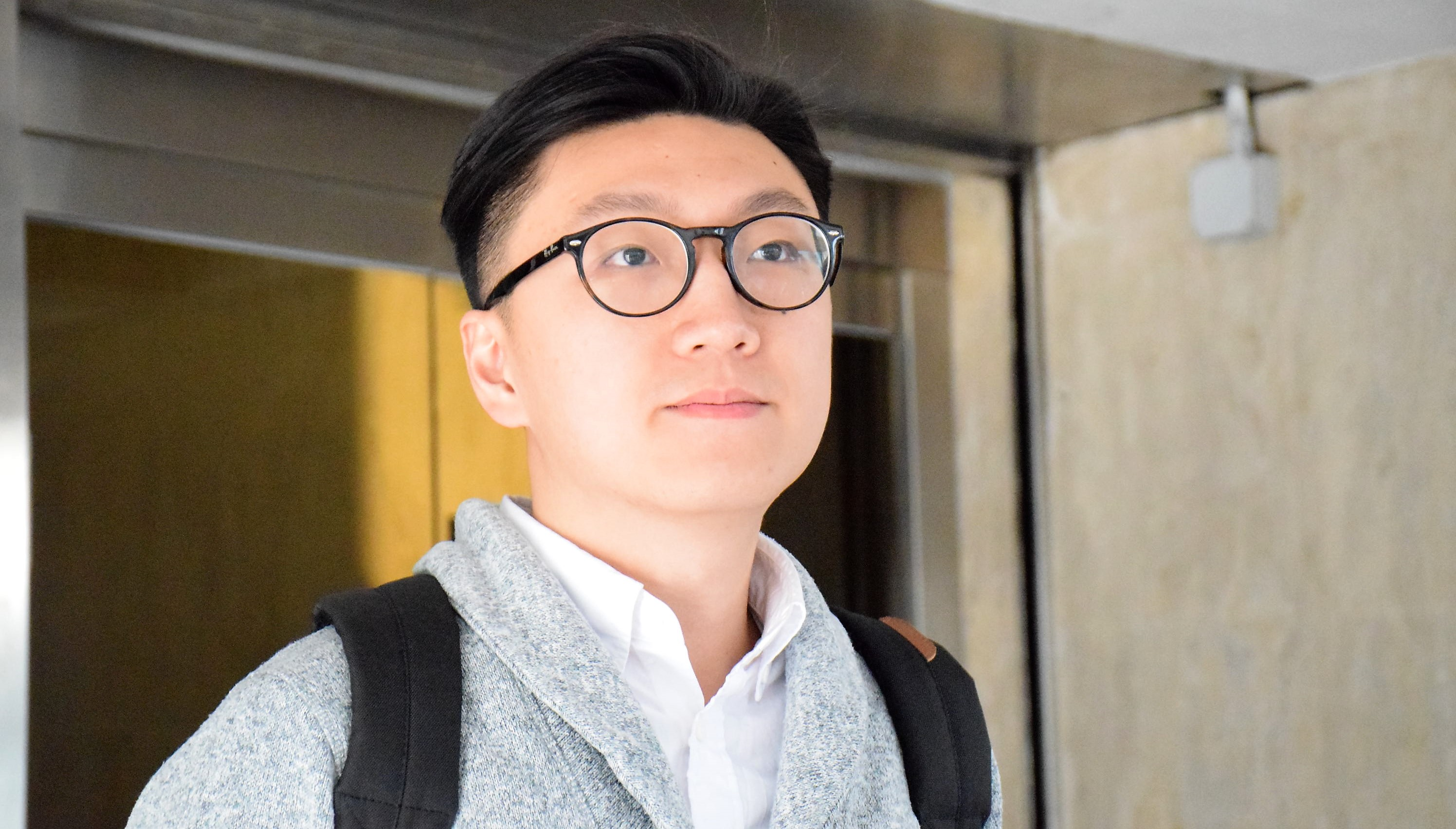
Leung outside High Court of Hong Kong in December 2017.

On 18 January 2018, Leung and five other protesters were called in court on riot charges, Leung and Ray Wong were also charged with inciting riots between 8 and 9 February 2016 at Portland Street, Mong Kok, and police assault charges.

On 22 January 2018, Leung pleaded guilty of assault charges, but denied rioting and inciting riot. He was instantly remanded in custody. On 18 May nine jurors reached a unanimous verdict that Leung was guilty of rioting and assault charges, but was acquitted on inciting riots. He was later sentenced to six years in prison. It is believed that Leung's lengthy sentence was intended to intimidate activists and squelch political protest.

On 5 March 2020, local media reported that Leung had been transferred to a maximum-security prison.

=== Appeal ===
During the jail time, Leung appealed his charges and sentence, and applied for legal aid. In March 2019, jurors ruled with 7:2 ratio that Leung was not guilty in a second rioting case pertaining to the same night in 2016 as the other one. In October 2019 Leung launched a crowdfunding campaign for his appeal, and received over 450,000 Hong Kong dollars in 15 minutes. On 29 April 2020, Leung lost an appeal against his six-year jail term.

=== Release ===
Leung was released from Shek Pik Prison on 19 January 2022 on after serving four years of his six-year sentence. After his release, he deleted his Facebook page. He stated that he would not give any interviews or receive visits, and must observe a supervision order.

== Political stance ==
Leung was educated in Hong Kong. This has shaped his values and deep passions to Hong Kong. He was also inspired by The Social Contract by French thinker, Jean-Jacques Rousseau and Hong Kong City-state by Chin Wan. Leung has identified himself as a radical localist loyal to Hong Kong, promoting localism, and openly support, advocate Hong Kong Independence. He refused to identify himself as a Chinese, asserting Hong Kong's ability to be independent, and is an inevitable trend.

Leung initially wanted to incorporate localism ideology into mainstream political agenda, and provide the rights for Hong Kong people to determine their future. He believed his by-election approval rate is an alarm to the government. Another main goal is to de-colonize Hong Kong. Leung also believes that the core values and systems of Hong Kong are slowly corroded by China and anyone can be considered Hong Kong people if he or she is willing to defend Hong Kong's core values, respect Hong Kong culture, and willing to merge and maintain Hong Kong's codes and systems. He also believes localism supporters need a councilor to represent their wills.

In accordance with Hong Kong Indigenous' theme "Valiant", Leung believes Valiant is a mindset instead of behaviour, also agreeing sometimes it could be associated to violence. However, he agrees more aggressive ways are required to counter the government's unfair, corrupted system, even at the cost of sacrificing one's life. He also mentioned "no bottom line" does not necessarily mean at all costs. In 2015, Leung and Ray Wong advocated protesters to use Black bloc strategy to protect each other, yet he did not deny the actions of throwing rocks and arson, during Monk Kok civil unrest. After his disqualification, he believes revolution is the only way out. He also mentioned that to confront an evil government, actions should not be confined with "no violence", everything must be done to counter suppression. He expects Hong Kong revolution will require at least 16 years to succeed.

In 2017, Leung decided to temporarily halt pushing independence. In 2018, Leung revealed his wish for Localist and Democrats to reach a consensus, resolve differences and stand united against the government.

In 2019, Leung wrote an open letter to support anti-extradition bill protesters, but also implored protesters not to risk their lives and be dominated by hatred.

== Influences ==
Edward Leung is a protester after the Umbrella Revolution. Hong Kong Indigenous approves Leung's successful effort to incorporate localism into mainstream political stage. During the 2016 by-election, compared to other candidates who condemned protesters' violence, Leung was able to garner votes from more radical voters, raising his fame and ultimately his final number of votes had exceeded the expectations of many. This was widely seen as signifying the rise of localism and a strong inspiration in the upcoming Legislative Council election.

Leung also claimed that, after the by-election, localism effectively became the third power in Hong Kong Politics, alongside Pro-democracy groups and Pro-Beijing groups. Leung's candidature for the Legco election triggered polar reactions. Also, the HKSAR government, just before the nomination period ended, abruptly requested candidate to sign confirmation, declaring support to Hong Kong Basic Law and promise loyalty to HKSAR. This led to Leung's disqualification. Later Leung was sentenced to 6 years in prison due to participation in the 2016 Mong Kok civil unrest.

Tai Kung Pao once commented on Leung's clear mind, quick response, and excellent communication skills, believing HKSAR Government need to treat the by-election results seriously. Former Chief Executive of Hong Kong Leung Chun-Ying criticized Leung's behaviour. Since Leung was born in China, he was once accused of improvising his localist stance. His life and political career were documented in the film Lost in the Fumes in 2017, an award-winning biographical documentary by Nora Lam. However, no mainstream cinema in Hong Kong was willing to screen the film, renewing fears about self-censorship and suppress of freedom of speech.

In November 2019, Leung was nominated by Time on its "100 Next" as one of the top 100 rising stars predicted to shape the world's future. Time commented that although Leung has been jailed since 2016, anti-extradition bill protesters treated him as a spiritual leader. "Liberate Hong Kong, revolution of our times" slogan was widely used and Lost in the fumes was a highly successful political documentary.

The late businessman Stanley Ho and Leung are both HKU alumni. On 27 May 2020, HKU uploaded several group photographs, dated on 18 February 2014 at Ricci Hall 85th Anniversary with other alumni to show condolences, but Leung's part was found to be intentionally scrapped. This was widely condemned as self-censorship and wiping history in order to be "politically correct". HKU responded that their intention was to make the main character Stanley Ho stand out from the crowd. However, by cutting Leung away, Stanley Ho's lower body was scrapped and he was not centered in the picture anymore. After wide criticization, HKU replaced with the original photograph after two hours.

== See also ==
- Localism in Hong Kong
