= Lost in the Fumes =

2017 Hong Kong documentary by Nora Lam

- Film poster
- 地厚天高
- Directed by: Nora Lam
- Produced by: Vincent Chui; Peter Yam
- Starring: Edward Leung
- Cinematography: Nora Lam
- Distributed by: Ying e Chi
- Release date: 23 November 2017 (Hong Kong)
- Running time: 97 minutes
- Country: Hong Kong
- Language: Cantonese
- Budget: HK$100,000 (approx. US$12,800)

Lost in the Fumes (Chinese: 地厚天高) is a 2017 Hong Kong biographical documentary film based on the life of politician and activist Edward Leung. The film was directed by Nora Lam and was first screened on 23 November 2017.

== Synopsis ==
The film tracks Leung's life from his university education to his participation in various elections and protests. This includes his participation in the 2016 New Territories East by-election, where he won more than 60,000 votes; the 2016 Hong Kong legislative election, where he was disqualified, despite signing the confirmation form; and the 2016 Mong Kok civil unrest, where he was arrested with three charges of rioting.

== Development ==
In an interview with Stand News, director Nora Lam said she was inspired to make films after watching KJ Music and Life, a 2009 Hong Kong biopic. Lam noted that while she and Leung were both students at the University of Hong Kong's Faculty of Arts, she has never attempted to contact Leung, and her perception of Leung mainly came from depictions of him in mainstream media. Lost in the Fumes was the third documentary Lam made.

== Release ==
The film was distributed by Ying e Chi, a company founded by independent filmmaker Vincent Chui in 1997 which has distributed several films relating to the 2014 Hong Kong protests. The film was first screened on 23 November 2017 at the Hong Kong Arts Centre. Tickets for the film's two premieres were sold out in two hours, and the film has since been popular at many screenings at colleges, universities, arts and community venues, including the Hong Kong Film Archive, HKICC Lee Shau Kee School of Creativity and the Hong Kong Science Museum. However, as of May 2018, no mainstream cinema in Hong Kong was willing to screen the film, renewing fears about the continued erosion of freedom of speech and self-censorship in Hong Kong. Time magazine, in recognition of Edward Leung on its "100 Next" list, called the film essential viewing for participants of the 2019–20 Hong Kong protests. Protesters frequently screened the film during the 2019 protests in order to raise public awareness of protest activities.

In Singapore, the film was classified as M18, which meant that the film was restricted to persons aged 18 or above, because of "political sensitivities," and was only screened to members of the Singapore Film Society.

== Reception ==
The film won a merit award at the 2017 Hong Kong Film Critics Society Awards. At the 2018 Taiwan International Documentary Festival, the film received a Special Award for Chinese-language documentaries.

== Impact of national security law ==
The Hong Kong national security law was enacted by China in June 2020. The law includes sweeping provisions against "subversion", including "inciting hatred of the central government and Hong Kong's regional government". Subversion and advocating secession are punishable by life imprisonment. The law is considered a serious threat to Hong Kong's freedom of speech.

The Hong Kong University Students' Union intends to host a screening of Lost in the Fumes in February 2021, the fifth anniversary of the 2016 Mong Kok civil unrest. In light of the national security law, the university administration urged against showing the film, and indicated that campus security may be deployed to block the screening.
