= YEC =

YEC may refer to:

- Year-End Championships, unofficial name of the annual season-ending pro tennis events
  - ATP World Tour Finals (men's tennis)
  - WTA Championships (women's tennis)
- Yeniche language (ISO 629-3 code), a variety of German spoken in Europe
- Ying e Chi, a non-profit organization of independent filmmakers in Hong Kong
- Yorkshire Engine Company, a former locomotive manufacturer in Sheffield, England
- Young Earth creationism, a religious belief that life and earth were created within 6 thousand to about 10 thousand years ago
- Yukon Energy Corporation, a Canadian Crown corporation in the Yukon
- Yecheon Air Base, the IATA code YEC
