= Blue Island (2022 film) =

2022 Hong Kong documentary by Chan Tze-woon

- Japanese promotional poster
- Directed by: Chan Tze-woon
- Written by: Chan Tze-woon
- Produced by: Peter Yam
- Cinematography: Szeto Yat-lui
- Edited by: Chan Tze-woon; Silen Wu
- Music by: Jacklam Ho Tsz Yeung; Guyshawn Wong
- Production company: Blue Island Production Company Limited
- Release date: 26 January 2022 (IFFR)
- Running time: 97 minutes
- Country: Hong Kong
- Languages: Cantonese; Mandarin; English

Blue Island (Chinese: 憂鬱之島; lit. 'Island of Depression') is a 2022 Hong Kong documentary film directed by Chan Tze-woon. It focuses on the 2019–2020 Hong Kong protests. The film won the Best International Feature Documentary Award at the 2022 Hot Docs Festival.

== Content ==
The film blends narrative drama and documentary elements, depicting major political events and representative figures from three different periods in China and Hong Kong’s history. Each segment is a combination of past and present of Hong Kong: one story of historic protestor followed by a recent one.

=== Pursuing Freedom ===
Representative figure: Chan Hak-chi

Set against the backdrop of the Cultural Revolution in the 1970s, the film follows a young couple who risk their lives swimming across the Shenzhen border to escape political turmoil and reach Hong Kong in 1973. Later, it captures an elderly man who, despite heavy rain during a No. 8 typhoon signal, insists on his daily morning swim in Victoria Harbour.

=== Democracy and Disillusionment ===
Representative figure: Lam Yiu-keung

The film documents a group of Hong Kong university students who traveled to Beijing in May 1989 to support the pro-democracy movement, participating in protests and hunger strikes. Lam Yiu-keung, then the chairman of the Hong Kong Federation of Students, went to Beijing and witnessed the Tiananmen Square Massacre firsthand.

Years later, he burned joss paper outside the Western Divisional Police Station in remembrance of the victims. However, when he chanted "Democratic China," he was met with boos from some attendees, revealing ideological divisions.

=== Identity in China and Hong Kong ===
Representative figure: Shek Chung-ying (formerly Raymond Young)

16-year-old Raymond Young was arrested on September 1 during the 1967 riots for possessing seditious slogans. In court, when questioned by the judge, Yeung declared that their goal was to defend Maoist thought and promoted "anti-violence resistance" throughout the trial. He was sentenced to prison for 18 months. The young prisoner later wrote under the pen name Shek Chung-ying.

Kelvin Tam Kwan-Long is a social work student sentenced to three and a half years in prison for rioting during the 2019 Anti-Extradition Bill protests. Tam express his own thoughts, emphasizing his different sense of identity from Raymond Young. Unlike Young, who identified with China, Tam insists in court that he is "a Hongkonger, not Chinese."

=== Hong Kong’s Present and Future ===
The final section of the film revisits key moments of the 2019 protests, including the occupation of the Legislative Council. It features Chung Yiu-wa reading aloud the petition from the "Occupy Central Nine" case in 2014. The film also highlights how protest slogans and mass demonstrations, once common in Hong Kong, have disappeared under the combined effects of the COVID-19 pandemic and the National Security Law.

The film’s closing sequence is a silent montage of over 20 individuals staring into the camera, with captions listing their trial or sentencing statuses. It concludes with the credits, revealing that some of the film’s crew members are currently imprisoned or have passed away.

== Awards ==
Year	Award	Category	Name	Result	Ref.
2021	The 52th Visions du Réel	Lightdox Award	Blue Island	Won	
2022	The 29th Hot Docs Canadian International Documentary Festival	Best International Feature Documentary	Blue Island	Won	
2022	The 13th Taiwan International Documentary Festival	Special Jury Prize	Blue Island	Won	
2022	The 13th Taiwan International Documentary Festival	Grand Prize	Blue Island	Won	
2022	The 13th Taiwan International Documentary Festival	Audience Award	Blue Island	Won	
2022	The 40th CAAMFest	Documentary Competition award	Blue Island	Won	
2022	The 18th Zurich Film Festival	Golden Eye Award for Best International Documentary Film	Blue Island	Nominated	
2022	The 15th Asia Pacific Screen Awards	Best Documentary Film	Blue Island	Nominated	
2022	The 59th Golden Horse Awards	Best Documentary Feature	Blue Island	Nominated	

== Reception ==
The film received positive reviews in Variety and The New York Times.

Simon Abrams of RogerEbert.com rated the film 2.5 stars out of 5, writing that it "features a lot of great footage, but a lot of it either doesn’t hang together or flow seamlessly from one episodic scene to the next."
