= PolePole Higashi-Nakano =

Japanese mini theater

- PolePole
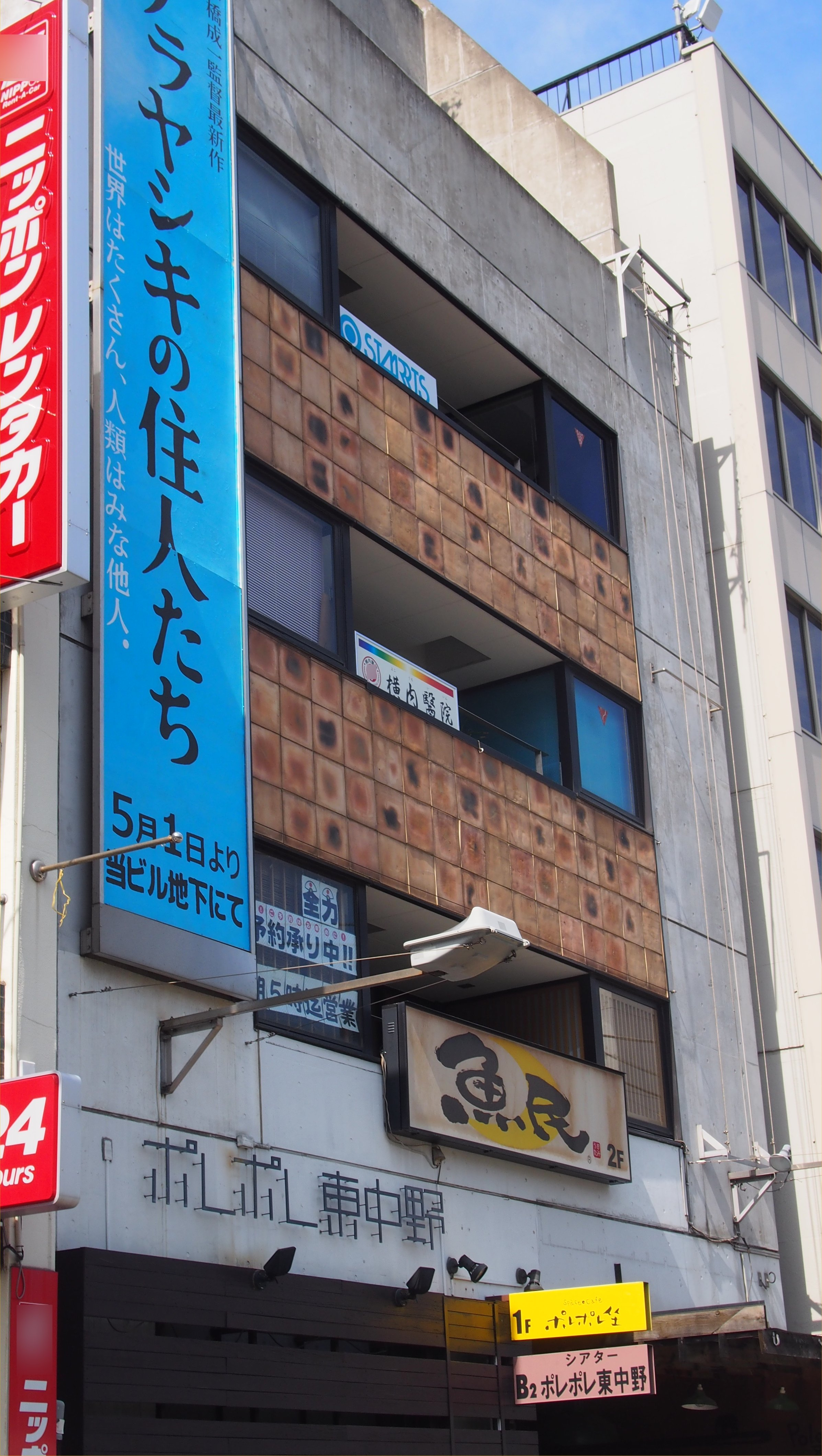
- PolePole Higashi-Nakano 2015
- Interactive map of PolePole Higashi-Nakano
- Address: Nakano, Tokyo; Japan
- Coordinates: 35°42′23.6″N 139°41′4.3″E
- Capacity: 96
- Type: Theater

Construction
- Opened: September, 2003

Website
- pole2.co.jp

PolePole Higashi-Nakano (Japanese: ポレポレ東中野, Hepburn: Porepore Higashi Nakano) is a mini theater in Higashi-Nakano, Nakano, Tokyo, Japan. The theater's name, "PolePole," means "slowly, slowly" in Swahili. It has 1 screen and 96 seats.

== History ==
The movie theater "BOX Higashi Nakano", which preceded PolePole Higashi-Nakano, closed on April 25, 2003, due to contractual issues between the operating company and the building owner.

After that, the building owner publicly solicited a new manager, and the management right was obtained by Seiichi Motohashi's company PolePole Times. On September 6, 2003, the theater reopened as PolePole Higashi-Nakano with Takahiro Otsuki as the manager.

In 2018, Takahiro Otsuki established a new company PolePole Higashi-Nagano and the company acquired the management right from PolePole Times.

== Summary ==
PolePole Higashi-Nakano is the only movie theater in Nakano.

It mainly screens documentary films, which were a feature of BOX Higashi Nakano, as well as self-distributed works and feature films by young directors. One of the biggest hits screened at PolePole Higashi-Nakano is Life Is Fruity.
