= Ying e Chi =

Ying e Chi logo

Ying e Chi (Chinese: 影意志) is a non-profit organization formed in 1997 by a group of independent filmmakers in Hong Kong. Ying e Chi Limited is incorporated on 7 May 1999. Independent film makers of Ying e Chi include Vincent Chui, Kwok Wai-lun, Simon Chung, Charlie Lam and Lawrence Wong. Ying e Chi co-founded the Hong Kong Asian Film Festival (Chinese: 香港亞洲電影節). Later, they parted ways with HKAFF Society Limited, and self-organized Hong Kong Independent Film Festival since 2008.

Over the years, several independent films have been distributed by Ying e Chi, including Yellowing (2016), Lost in the Fumes (2017), Last Exit to Kai Tak (2018), Taking Back the Legislature (2020), and Inside the Red Brick Wall (2020). These films are politically sensitive and mostly about the Hong Kong protests, and other cinema would not air them. Because of its stance in the political landscape of Hong Kong, Ying e Chi is often attacked by pro-Beijing media, namely Wen Wei Po and Ta Kung Pao. This is especially true during the anti-extradition bill movement.

Ying e Chi lost government funding from the Hong Kong Arts Development Council in 2021, and was unable to renew its contract with Jockey Club Creative Arts Centre for its studio. Ying e Chi later officially disbanded in 2024. One of its original founders, Vincent Chui, appeared to be restarting the organization in Taiwan by organizing the HK Indie Short Film Award 2025 under the name of Ying e Chi.
