= Yellowing (film) =

2016 Hong Kong documentary by Chan Tze-woon

- Poster
- 亂世備忘
- Directed by: Chan Tze-woon
- Produced by: Peter Yam; Chan Tze-woon
- Cinematography: Chan Tze-woon
- Edited by: Jean Hu; Chan Tze-woon
- Music by: Jacklam Ho Tsz Yeung
- Distributed by: Ying e Chi
- Release date: 2016
- Running time: 126 minutes
- Country: Hong Kong
- Language: Cantonese

Yellowing (Chinese: 亂世備忘, lit. 'Memo of the Troubled Times') is a 2016 Hong Kong documentary directed by Chan Tze-woon. Set against the backdrop of the 2014 Umbrella Movement, the film documents the struggles, setbacks, and emotions of the movement's participants while exploring Hong Kong's political and social changes.

This documentary gained attention for its firsthand perspective and authenticity. However, due to its sensitive political themes, it faced censorship at certain film festivals and cinemas. Despite this, it was screened at platforms such as the Golden Horse Film Festival (2016) in Taiwan, the Hong Kong International Film Festival, the International Film Festival Rotterdam in 2020. And it is regarded as one of the most important visual records of the Umbrella Movement.

== Content ==
Yellowing is not just a straightforward news documentary—it is filmed from the perspective of a participant, with director Chan Tze-woon capturing the raw and personal reality throughout this historic protest. The film portrays how students and citizens took part in the movement, as well as their pressures and hopes. The opening scene depicts the dazzling fireworks in Tamar Park one year after the Umbrella Movement, contrasting with police tear gas during the movement, symbolizing Hong Kong's upheaval and conflicts. The director also incorporates home video footage to juxtapose the Hong Kong of the past with the present turmoil and youth resistance.

The documentary consists of 20 segments, each documenting the daily lives, thoughts, and struggles of movement participants. Through the director's lens, viewers witness young people confronting the police on the frontlines, organizing supply distribution, setting up street classrooms, and engaging in discussions about value conflicts, generational divides, political stances, and class struggles. The director emphasizes that this movement is not just a political action but also a personal decision about freedom and the future.

The film captures protesters' daily lives, police clearance operations, and reflections from participants after the movement ended. It seeks to present the thoughts of Hong Kong's younger generation on democracy and their future. One quote from the film, "If you are born in a cage, does that mean you have to live in it forever?", highlights the determination and courage of Hongkongers in their struggle for democracy and freedom under pressure from Beijing's rule.

== Awards ==
Year	Event	Award	Name	Result	Ref.
2016	Golden Horse Film Festival	Best Documentary	Yellowing	Nominated	
2017	Yamagata International Documentary Film Festival	Shinsuke Ogawa Award	Yellowing	Won	
