= Hong Kong Independent Film Festival =

Hong Kong event (2008–2021)

- Poster of 2021 with "Hong Kong Independent" whited out
- Location: Hong Kong
- Predecessor: Hong Kong Asian Film Festival
- Founded: 2008
- Disestablished: 2021
- Website: ~~http://www.hkindieff.hk/~~

Hong Kong Independent Film Festival (HKIndieFF) was founded by Ying e Chi in 2008.

== History ==
=== Founding Ying e Chi ===
In 1995, ifva was founded by the Council of Performing Arts, which was renamed the Hong Kong Arts Development Council that same year and added "Film and Media" to its funding categories. The 1st ifva participants, including Vincent Chui, were encouraged by then ifva president Gordon Chan to make low-budget commercial films as a way to sustain their filmmaking careers. Initially, they applied for project funding to produce individual works, and later used the funds to organize public screenings. In 1997, they screened their works under the name of "Ying e Chi" for the first time at Hong Kong Arts Centre and Hong Kong City Hall.

At the time, they also held screenings at Cine-Art House and Broadway Cinematheque. Cine-Art House was generally supportive, though it was cautious regarding overtly political works. One example was Leaving in Sorrow (2001), a film about the 1989 tiananmen square crackdown had good reception in the screening at Hong Kong Arts Centre. Another important partner was Shu Kei's Creative Workshop Limited (創造社) which assisted in distributing films on disc.

Around 2002, they started collaborating with Broadway Cinematheque, receiving a lukewarm response that year. In 2003, Esther Yeung (楊慧蘭) joined the team and launched the programme "Indie Is Fun?" (點解獨立咁過癮), which was praised and drew a larger audience. Thus, the two organizations co-founded the Hong Kong Asian Film Festival (HKAFF). The HKAFF quickly gained popularity, and the event grew larger each year, eventually overshadowing Ying e Chi. Although it was intended to promote non-mainstream and alternative cinema and providing a platform for discussions, it proved largely ineffective. Amid growing differences in vision and philosophy, Ying e Chi eventually parted ways with Broadway Cinematheque, and founded HKIndieFF in 2008.

=== Hong Kong Independent Film Festival ===
Initially named Hong Kong Asian Independent Film Festival (HKAIFF), the event focused exclusively on Asian independent films. At the time, Ying e Chi operated with only two to three staff members. After its funding was completely cut by the Hong Kong Arts Development Council for three consecutive years beginning in 2011, the organization relied largely on a few university interns. Despite these challenges, HKIndieFF persisted, periodically introducing new program elements.

Over the years, the event was held irregularly due to the lack of funding, venue, or other reasons, and several major changes were introduced. After its first two years, the organizers concluded that the "Asian" in the title limited the film selection, particularly when they wanted to feature John Cassavetes' films, so they dropped it from the title. In 2010, returning to Hong Kong Arts Centre after two decades, the screenings of Shinsuke Ogawa's films selected in connection with a series of social events related to Tsoi Yuen Tsuen (Note: a.k.a. Choi Yuen Tsuen or Choi Yuen village, a village facing demolition with the construction of Hong Kong Express Rail Link.) were proved successful. From then on, the organizers used this approach, selecting films connected to local social and cultural contexts to engage the audiences. They also decided to streamline the program by removing the press conference as well as the opening and closing scenes, retaining only a closing ceremony to thank the staff and volunteers, focusing on the audience and filmmakers. From 2014 onward, volunteers played a significant role in sustaining the festival.

A decennial book, On Earth We Stand, was released in 2017. The book reflects on the development of Hong Kong independent cinema as both an artistic practice and a form of social engagement. The editors wrote "By bringing together stories of films and the people behind them, the book highlights how independent cinema in Hong Kong functions not only as exhibition, but as a social movement shaping local cultural identity and public discourse."

In 2021, under the new national security law, the poster of the 13th HKIndieFF had the "Hong Kong Independent" words whited out, because the printers refused to produce festival posters. Under political pressure, HKIndieFF discontinued and Ying e Chi later disbanded.

== Past events ==
=== 2008 HKAIFF ===
The event was held at The Grand Cinema, Elements, Hong Kong, from 15 November to 30 November. A total of 45 drama, documentaries and shorts were selected for screening. Eight were from Hong Kong, while the remainder represented Japan, Korea, Taiwan, Iran, Israel, Laos, and Bangladesh.

Year	Theme	Opening film	Closing film	Selected features	Director in Focus - Nobuhiro Yamashita
2008 (1st)	—N/a	King of Spy by Chu Ka-yat; Good morning, Luang Prabang by Sakchai Deenan	3 Narrow Gates by Vincent Chui; The Rebirth by Masahiro Kobayashi	Banana Skin by Ali Atshani; Citizen King^ by Johnson Lee & Ching Long; Gone Shopping by Wee Li Lin; In the Name of God by Shoaib Mansoor; Lala, Sunshine by Aaron Kim; Magazine Gap Road by Nicholas Chin; Ploning by Dante Nico Garcia; Port Unknown by Mamunur Rashid; Synching Blue^ by Seo Won-tae; The Autumnal Equinox by Kwong Po Wai & Thomas Lam; Tokyo Gore Police by Yoshihiro Nishimura; Zombie Self-Defense Force by Naoyuki Tomomatsu	A Gentle Breeze in the Village; Most Dangerous Man Alive; Paris, Texas, Moriguchi; The Matsugane Potshot Affair
^ Recommended films

Other selections (documentaries and shorts)

==== Documentaries ====
- 3 x FTMs by Kim II-rhan
- A Chinese Class by Quentin Lee
- Broken Blossom by Naomi Matsuoka
- Huangcun Office, by Guo Zidong
- Jin-ok Goes to School by Kim Jin-yeul
- Keep Walking by Bae Su-kyong
- Pathos by Naomi Matsuoka
- The District Councillor by Lotus Chan
- The Secret in the Satchel by Lin Tay-jou
- The Tale of Two Villages by Chen Xinzhong
- The Virgin Wildsides (Vol. 1 & 2) by Tetsuaki Matsue
- Who Am I, Macau by Chu Iao-ian

==== Shorts ====
- Grandma and Wrestling by Lim Hyung-sup
- Ha! Butterfly Rescuers by Lee Dahl
- Insights by Dana Keida
- Naked of Love by Maeda Koji
- Shred of Hope by Tom Shoval
- Substance of Earth by Kim Jin-man
- The Bear Stories by Marina Karpova
- The Big Head Boy by Hsiao Hung-lin & Liu Yong-ming
- The Eighteenth Birthday Party by Chuang Ching-shen
- The End of the Tunnel by Chang Rong-ji
- The Dream of Cortázar by Lee Jin-woo
- The Sparrow and the Boll by Morteza Ahadi
- Woods by Idan Vardi

=== 2009 HKAIFF ===
The event was held at The Grand Cinema, Elements, Hong Kong, from 14 November to 29 November. A total of 30 films were selected, and presented in six categories: Memoirs of Sichuan (films about 2008 Sichuan earthquake), About Our World, Several Generations of Indie Spirit - Mary Stephen, Relationships & Struggles, Woman's Stories, and Back to Homeland.

Year	Theme	Opening film	Closing film	Memoirs of Sichuan	About Our World	Indie Spirit - Mary Stephen
2009 (2nd)	—N/a	Dead Slowly by Rita Hui Nga-shu; The Clone Returns Home by Kanji Nakajima	The People I've Slept With by Quentin Lee; 1428 by Du Haibin	Buried by Wang Libo; Little Photographers by Can To; Red White by Chen Xinzhong; The Key by Health Tu	All My Failed Attempts by Tan Chui Mui; Chain by Akihito Kajiya; In the Fog by Ryo Iizuka; Stories on Human Rights by Marina Abramović, Hany Abu-Assad & Armağan Ballantyne; The President Is Coming by Kunaal Roy Kapur	A Breath with Pina Bausch by Huseyin Karabey; Boran by Huseyin Karabey; Hush! by Berke Bas; My Marlon and Brando by Huseyin Karabey; The Tree, the Mayor and the Mediatheque by Éric Rohmer; Three Days in Winter by Arlette Girardot

Other selections

==== Relationships & Struggles ====
- Ayu by Lai Chun-yu
- Chants Within Doldrums by Fung Kwok-kee
- How to Live on Earth by Ahn Seul-ki
- Roses Have Thorns by John W. Lee
- That's Why You Go Away by Chan Chui-hing

==== Woman's Stories ====
- HERstory Jeritan by Cecilia Ho Wing-yin
- Let's Fall In Love by Wuna Wu
- My Iranian Paradise by Annette Mari Olsen & Katia Forbert Petersen

==== Back to Homeland ====
- Finding Shangri-la by Ismene Ting
- Motherland by Doris Yeung
- Nonko by Kazuyoshi Kumakiri
