= Jury system in Hong Kong =

The practice of trial by jury has a long history in Hong Kong. Like most jurisdictions with jury trial, this tradition was introduced into Hong Kong when it became a British colony. The Ordinance for the Regulation of Jurors and Juries was first enacted in 1845. Ever since then, the practice of trial by jury has been an important part of Hong Kong’s judicial system. This is also recognised in the Basic Law, Article 86: "The principle of trial by jury previously practised in Hong Kong shall be maintained."

There is no absolute right to trial by jury in Hong Kong. Juries are only present in inquests in the Coroner's Court and in the Court of First Instance, where jury trials are available for criminal proceedings as well as certain civil matters, such as defamation.

== History and development ==
=== 1845 ===
The Ordinance for the Regulation of Jurors and Juries was enacted. The Ordinance stated that "all questions of fact, whether of a civil and criminal nature upon which issue shall be taken in the course of any proceeding before the Supreme Court ... shall be decided by the verdict of a jury of six men."

This was the first piece of local legislation to formally introduce and regulate the jury system in Hong Kong. The jury system in Hong Kong has changed and evolved through time; and it is quite different from the one implanted in 1845.

=== 1858 ===
For the first time, the name of a Chinese Hong Kong resident, Wong A. Shing, showed up on the list of jurors. The Legislative Council had a special meeting over the issue and reached the result of retaining the name and adopting the list. A year later, the Legislative Council had a debate over the same issue and reached the same result after voting on the matter.

== Criminal juries ==
All criminal trials in the Court of First Instance of the High Court must be held with a jury, except for national security offences. Since the Court of First Instance typically only hears cases involving the most serious of offences, only the most serious offences will involve a trial by jury — usually crimes carrying a likely sentence upon conviction of 7 years or more.

As the Secretary for Justice has the right to choose the venue in which to commence proceedings against a defendant, the prosecution can effectively avoid a jury trial by choosing to file charges in the District Court or a magistrates' court, where juries are not available. Many cases involving rioting charges arising from the 2019 protests were transferred from the Court of First Instance to the District Court, which allowed the cases to be heard before a single district judge, albeit one with lesser sentencing powers, instead of before a High Court judge with a seven or nine-person jury.

== Criteria for service as a juror ==
Section 4 of the Jury Ordinance provides the criteria for service as a juror.

- must be a Hong Kong resident
- aged 21 to 65
- of good character
- sound mind
- not afflicted by blindness, deafness or other disability preventing from serving as a juror
- has a sufficient knowledge of the language in which the proceedings are to be conducted

== Legal duty to serve as a juror ==
=== Consequences for failing to discharge jury duty ===
The Jury Ordinance also places a legal duty for those who are qualified under the prescribed criteria to serve as jurors. Those who fail to serve as jurors in a court proceeding without approval may face charges of contempt of court. In 2007, a juror was found guilty of contempt of court and sent to jail for three weeks for faking incapacity. In addition, under Section 32 of the Jury Ordinance, it is an offence for those who fail to attend in response to a summons to juror.

=== Protection ===
In order to protect jurors from unfavourable employment consequences, Section 33 of the Jury Ordinance forbids employers from discriminating against any of their employees who has served or is serving as juror in any court proceedings. Any person who contravenes Section 33 is guilty of an offence and liable to a fine of $25,000 and to imprisonment for 3 months.

=== Exemptions ===
Anyone in any one of the following categories is exempt from serving as a juror.

- judges, registrars, barristers and solicitors
- justices of the peace
- public servants from the disciplined services
- full-time students
- certain categories of religious ministers
- newspaper editors and staff
- doctors, dentists and veterinary surgeons
- those who have received approval of exemption from the Registrar or the judge

The precise list of exemption categories is provided in Section 5 of the Jury Ordinance.

=== Compensation ===
Once selected to serve as a member of the jury in a case, a juror is paid in accordance with Section 31 of the Jury Ordinance for each day during the whole or part of which the juror serves. In accordance to the subsidiary legislation of the Jury Ordinance, Allowances to Jurors Order, a juror is currently paid HKD995 for each day served or part thereof.

== Empanelling the jury ==
=== List of jurors ===
Each alternate year, following the details in the Jury Ordinance, the Registrar of the High Court makes a provisional list of jurors and inform them that they have been selected and asked to serve as jurors. If any of the potential jurors want to be excused from serving and have good reasons for that, they should contact and apply for exemption with the Registrar within two weeks from the time when they receive the notice of service. Moreover, the Registrar publishes the list of jurors in the Gazette and in one English and one Chinese newspaper.

=== Number of jurors ===
Provided in Section 25(4) of the Jury Ordinance, the jury shall consist of not less than five persons in any civil or criminal trial or coroner's inquest. Accordingly, criminal cases are normally tried by a seven-person jury. From time to time, at the discretion of the judge, a jury may increase in size to nine jurors.

=== Random selection ===
According to Section 13 and 21 of the Jury Ordinance, each potential juror is assigned a number. The Registrar is then to print the number on separate cards of equal size and put into a box. Afterwards, in open court, the Registrar draws cards from the box until a jury is formed.

=== Strikes ===
The accused person can challenge and strike a juror for good cause. In addition to the unlimited number of strikes to use on jurors with cause, the accused is granted the power to challenge and strike up to 5 jurors without any reason (peremptory challenge). However, the Secretary for Justice, whose office prosecutes the accused and initiates the criminal proceedings, also has the right to challenge and strike a juror for cause but no right to give pre-emptive challenge.

In the Donald Tsang case, a candidate juror (a man) applied for exemption in order to take care of a baby after midnight. Initially the judge refused his application, but later the defence lawyer opposed the appointment of that candidate juror. This example shows the extent of the defence's influence over the selection of jurors.

== See also ==
- Law of Hong Kong
- Judiciary of Hong Kong
- Jury
- Jury trial
