= Life Is Fruity =

2017 documentary film

Life is Fruity
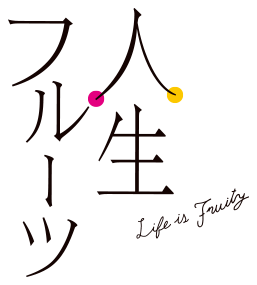
- Directed by: Kenshi Fushihara
- Production company: Tokai Television
- Distributed by: Tokai Television
- Release date: January 2, 2017
- Running time: 91 minutes
- Country: Japan
- Language: Japanese

Life is Fruity (人生フルーツ, Jinsei Furūtsu) is a 2017 Japanese documentary film. It was directed by Kenshi Fushihara, produced by Katsuhiko Amuno, dubbed by Kirin Kiki, photographed by Nobutaka Murata, and produced by Tōkai Television Broadcasting. The film's protagonists are Shuichi Tsubata and his wife, Hideko. It follows their daily life, whose idyllic nature has sparked discussion about the main characters' lifestyle choices. Life is Fruity premiered in Japan on November 6, 2016, and was screened in Kanto, Hokkaido-Northeast, Central, Kinki, and Okinawa. A novel adaptation of the same name was published that year.

== Overview ==
90-year-old Shuichi and 87-year-old Hideko live in a chalet in Kasugai City, Aichi Prefecture. Shuichi is an architect who moved there over 40 years earlier to live a rural life with his wife. He plants a vegetable garden and a large orchard.

Although Shuichi always wanted a ¥700,000 sailboat, his monthly salary was only ¥40,000. One day he tells Hideko about his dream, and she searches for ways to help him achieve it. Eiko secretly cancels their insurance and pawns their jewelry. Their budget is tight after that, but Hideko believes in maintaining a nutritious diet of fresh foods. After they move to the chalet, they insist on self-sufficiency and grow their own fruits and vegetables. Two hundred pings of land were divided into 21 plots, each planted with different vegetables and surrounded by fruit trees. Shuichi and Hideko grow cabbage, eggplant, cucumbers, strawberries, cherries, plums, persimmons, figs and tangerines, and maintained bird baths.

Shuichi writes at least ten letters a day to people he does not know well, including a young man who sells fish at the supermarket. When Yingzi bought fish, the young man produced the letter and fresh, delicious fish. Hideko, a good cook, cans fruits and vegetables as gifts. Shuichi keeps his dream of sailing alive with a mast (and flag) outside the chalet and rudders hanging indoors and outside. Shuichi does not like fruit, so Hideko squeezes fruit juice for him. He makes name tags for the vegetables and fruit, and a sign to warn Hideko about hitting her head on a tree. Shuichi agrees to design new facilities for a psychiatric hospital free of charge, because he wants to help the patients. He refuses many requests for interviews with him and Hideko, saying: "I don't have much time left, I want to enjoy it myself."

In June 2015, Shuichi takes his usual afternoon nap after working in the fields and dies in his sleep. Hideko sits next to him in a black dress, smiling through her tears, and promises to join him soon. She does what Shuichi did, watering and fertilizing the vegetables alone and silently guarding their home.

== Release ==
Life is Fruity was produced by Tōkai Television Broadcasting. The film was released in Japan on 2 January 2017, and was screened at the Urayasu Documentary Film Festival. It was released in Taiwan on 10 November 2017, and in the United States on 22 March 2018.

== Production ==
Producing a documentary includes planning, filming and editing. Documentary creation is a long-term process; before filming begins, the protagonist must be contacted and become familiar with the director (a process known as "pre-collection". Before filming Life is Fruity, director Kenshi Fushihara visited Shuichi Tsubata several times. After he wrote four letters to Shuichi, the couple finally agreed to be filmed.

During filming, the director forms a plan in accordance with previous planning. A documentary is full of uncertainty; Life is Fruity is a daily record of Shuichi and Hideko's lives, including their meals and activities.

The editing of a documentary is crucial. Film clips are arranged in a montage to form the final work, and clips are divided into a number of parts; video editing needs to be combined with material prepared in advance, and the editor clips the video in accordance with what the director wants to express. Sound needs to be synchronized with the video; there may be multiple sounds at once, which need to be balanced. In the process of mixing, an editor needs to adjust the volume of different sounds. Color balancing is also part of editing.

== Lifestyle ==
Migration can transform one's lifestyle, and people migrate in search of a better life. Shuichi and Hideko's lifestyle in the film has sparked discussion. Studies have been undertaken of leaving the city for rural life, indicating a reduced risk of respiratory disease. With the pressures of modern life, rural areas are envisioned as ideal destinations for "life immigrants". In Life is Fruity, Shuichi was an architect in new-town planning 50 years earlier and wants to build a house close to nature. When his plan is rejected for economic reasons, Shuichi quits his job, brings his wife to a new town and builds an ideal (to him) structure to coexist with nature. However, a gap between the rich and the poor in rural and urban areas still exists. Professor Andy Jones, professor of public health at the University of East Anglia, points out that a person's life is based on a number of choices: work, economics, health and lifestyle.

== Re-release and critical response ==
Life is Fruity was presented in the United States by the Japan Foundation and supported by Japan House in Los Angeles. An encore screening was held in Los Angeles on September 29, 2018, and it was screened at the June 7–28, 2018 Toronto Japanese Film Festival.

The film received the Kinema Jumpo Award for Best Film of the Year (Cultural Section), and was well-received by critics. According to Pat Mullen of Point of View, "There’s a wholesome charm to the film one can’t help but enjoy".

An asianmoviepulse.com review noted that Hideko’s days after Shuichi’s death are full of sorrow, as she continues to prepare meals for Shuichi every day. Director Kenshi Fushihara avoids melodrama, however, with his use of music. According to the reviewer, "Life is Fruity is a very sensitive and thorough documentary that presents an alternative, but also very Japanese way of life of two people".
