= 6.22 Civil Referendum =

The 6.22 Civil Referendum (Chinese: 6.22全民投票) was initiated by the Occupy Central with Love and Peace movement (abbreviated as "Occupy Central") and organized by the Public Opinion Programme of the University of Hong Kong to promote genuine universal suffrage. The referendum aimed to select a proposal for the Chief Executive election.

Voters were asked to choose among three political reform proposals: the Alliance for True Democracy Proposal, the People Power Proposal, and the Students Proposal. The proposal with the highest votes would become the plan supported and promoted by the Occupy Central movement.

Online voting began at noon on 20 June 2014, and physical polling stations opened on 22 June. The referendum was planned to last ten days, concluding on 29 June. The organizers announced that approximately 780,000 people participated in the vote.

== Background ==
In November 2013, Li Fei, Chairman of the Basic Law Committee, visited Hong Kong and stated that a "broadly representative nomination committee" referred to "institutional nomination," which should be composed of the four major sectors of the Election Committee—business and financial sectors, professional sectors, labor and religious sectors, and political sectors. He also emphasized that the number of candidates should be limited and that candidates must be "patriotic and love Hong Kong."

The pro-democracy camp strongly opposed Li Fei's remarks, arguing that the Basic Law does not mention the "four major sectors" and that "patriotic and love Hong Kong" is a subjective concept that should not be codified into law.

On 4 December 2013, the Hong Kong government launched a consultation paper on political reform. The consultation was promoted under the slogan "having discussions and negotiations." However, in the second phase of the consultation, the government completely rejected both "citizen nomination" and "citizen recommendation." This shocked former Chief Secretary Anson Chan, who criticized the government for breaking its promise of open discussions, thereby deepening social divisions.

A key controversy in Hong Kong’s political reform was the provision in the Basic Law that the Chief Executive must be elected by "universal suffrage after nomination by a broadly representative nomination committee according to democratic procedures." The composition of the nomination committee became a focal point of political debate. The pro-Beijing camp favored modifying the existing 1,200-member Election Committee while maintaining a majority approval requirement. Within the pro-democracy camp, opinions were divided; while some supported "citizen nomination" and "citizen recommendation," they broadly opposed a small-circle nomination process, advocating for broader public participation to prevent the committee from becoming a mere rubber stamp.

To consolidate opinions and determine the most widely accepted reform proposal among Hong Kong citizens, the initiators of Occupy Central—Benny Tai, Chan Kin-man, and Reverend Chu Yiu-ming—invited various groups to submit proposals. Experts from the University of Hong Kong’s Faculty of Law reviewed them for compliance with international standards, principles of universality and equality, and the Basic Law’s requirement of broad representation. Fifteen proposals were shortlisted, and during a Deliberation Day event, citizens who signed the Occupy Central intention letter selected three final proposals: the Alliance for True Democracy Proposal, the People Power Proposal, and the Students Proposal, all of which included elements of citizen nomination.

Some individuals whose proposals were rejected, including Anson Chan and Ronny Tong, expressed disappointment, which discouraged participation in the referendum. To address this, additional voting options were introduced to accommodate diverse opinions and maintain broad participation. The Occupy Central leaders also declared that if the referendum attracted fewer than 100,000 votes, they would step down from their leadership roles in the movement.

== Voting Details ==
The voting topics consist of two parts.

The first question is: "Regarding the 2017 Chief Executive election, which proposal should ‘Occupy Central with Love and Peace’ submit to the government?" This question has four options:

- Alliance for True Democracy Proposal
- People Power Proposal
- Students Proposal
- Abstain

The second question is: "If the government proposal cannot satisfy international standards allowing genuine choices by electors, should the Legislative Council veto it?" This question has three options:

- The Legislative Council should veto it
- The Legislative Council should not veto it
- Abstain

== Voting Methods ==
=== Physical Polling Stations ===
The 22 referendum provided the "PopVote" universal voting application for public download and voting.

The Public Opinion Programme of the University of Hong Kong set up polling stations in multiple locations across Hong Kong, including 14 regular polling stations and 7 auxiliary polling stations. Additionally, an overseas polling station was set up in Toronto, Canada, allowing Hong Kong residents abroad to vote.

All Hong Kong permanent residents aged 18 or above were eligible to vote and were required to present their original identity card at the polling station.

=== Online Voting ===
The Occupy Central movement also introduced an electronic voting system, allowing voters to cast their votes via a website or mobile application.

== Voting Results ==
According to the preliminary statistics from the Public Opinion Programme of the University of Hong Kong, the Alliance for True Democracy proposal received the most votes, with over 331,000 votes, accounting for approximately 42% of the total, making it the most supported option.

The Students Proposal came in second, with over 300,000 votes, representing about 38% of the total.

The People Power Proposal received over 80,000 votes, while around 70,000 voters abstained.

The final results were to be announced after counting the paper ballots.

1st question: "Regarding the 2017 Chief Executive election, which proposal should ‘Occupy Central with Love and Peace’ submit to the government?"
Options	Votes	%
Alliance for True Democracy proposal	333,962	42.1
People Power Proposal	82,003	10.3
Students Proposal	304,319	38.4
Abstention	70,630	8.9
Not voted	1,761	0.2
Blank votes	26	<0.1
Invalid votes	104	<0.1
Refuse to vote	3	<0.1
Total	792,808	100.0
2nd question: "If the government’s proposal does not meet international standards and fails to provide voters with a genuine choice, should the Legislative Council veto it?"
Options	Votes	%
The Legislative Council should veto it	696,092	87.8
The Legislative Council should not veto it	59,897	7.6
Abstention	31,294	3.9
Not voted	5,193	0.7
Blank votes	265	<0.1
Invalid votes	65	<0.1
Refuse to vote	2	<0.1
Total	792,808	100.0
Source: Public Opinion Programme of the University of Hong Kong
