= Vincent Chui =

Vincent Chui (崔允信) is an independent film director in Hong Kong. He starts his filming career in As Time Goes By (1997), a documentary film he co-directed with Ann Hui. Chui now lives in Taiwan.

Leaving in Sorrow (2001), starring Shawn Yue, which adopted the style of Dogma 95, also gained critical acclaim. His Love is Elsewhere premiered at the 2008 Hong Kong International Film Festival.

On April 29, 2011, Chui's new short film 《你還可愛麼》 佳叔 was posted on YouTube as part of the "Love More HK"/"你還可愛麼" project.

Chui is also one of the founder of non-profit film organization Ying e Chi, which is now disbanded. On 1 January 2025, he announced that he will hold HK Indie Short Film Award 2025 under the name of Ying e Chi.
