= Taiwan International Documentary Festival =

Taiwan International Documentary Festival 台灣國際紀錄片影展
- Location: Taipei, Taiwan
- Founded: 1998
- Language: International
- Website: www.tidf.org.tw

The Taiwan International Documentary Festival (TIDF, Chinese: 台灣國際紀錄片影展) is a documentary film festival held biannually in Taipei, Taiwan.

== Awards ==
A number of prizes are awarded at the festival, including:

- For films in the international competition:
  - Grand Prize
  - Merit Prize
- For films in the Asian Vision Competition:
  - Grand Prize
  - Merit Prize
- For films in the Taiwan Competition:
  - Grand Prize
  - Merit Prize

== List of winners of Grand Prize in the Asian Vision competition ==
Year	Film	Director	Nationality of Director
2004	Happy Berry	Thunska PANSITTIVORAKUL	Thailand, United States
2006	Dong	JIA Zhang-ke	China
2008	Using	ZHOU Hao	China
2010	Passion	Byamba SAKHYA	Mongolia
2012	The Sound of Old Rooms	Sandeep RAY	India, South Korea, United States
2014	Yumen	HUANG Xiang, John Paul SNIADECKI, XU Routao	China, United States
2016	Hero and the Cloak	Arash LAHOOTI	Iran
2018	Baek-gu	KIM Boram	South Korea
2021	Shadow Flowers	YI Seungjun	South Korea
2022	The Burrows	HU Sanshou	China
2024	Taman-taman (Park)	SO Yo-hen	Taiwan

== List of winners of Grand Prize in the International Competition ==
Year	Film	Director	Nationality of Director
1998	Voice	Andrey Osipov	Russia
2000	The Long Holiday	Johan van der Keuken	Netherlands
2002	On the Edge of Time: Male Domains in the Caucasus	Stefan Tolz	Germany
2004	Justice	Maria Ramos	Netherlands
2006	My Grandmother's House	Adán Aliaga	Spain
2008	End of the Rainbow	Robert Nugent	Australia
2010	In the Garden of Sounds	Nicola Bellucci	Switzerland
2012	With My Heart in Yambo	María Fernanda Restrepo	Ecuador
2014	The Empire of Shame	Hong Li-gyeong	South Korea
2016	Brothers	Aslaug Holm	Norway
2018	A Cambodian Spring	Chris Kelly	UK
2021	Erased,___ Ascent of the Invisible	Ghassan HALWANI	Lebanon
2022	Weiyena - The Long March Home	Weina ZHAO, Judith BENEDIKT	Austria
2024	The Trial	Ulises de la Orden	Argentina
