= Yu Yan (singer) =

Chinese singer and actress

- 喻言
- Born: Yu Yan; May 26, 1997 (age 29); Beijing
- Education: Beijing College of Politics and Law
- Occupations: Singer; actress
- Height: 172 cm (5 ft 8 in)
- Musical career
- Genre: C-pop
- Instruments: Vocals; guitar
- Years active: 2015–present
- Labels: Re-Du Media; JoinHall Media; ADQC (Note: As a member of The9 only.); iQiyi
- Formerly of: True; Diamond Girls; The9

Yu Yan
- Traditional Chinese: 喻言
- Simplified Chinese: 喻言
Transcriptions
Standard Mandarin
- Hanyu Pinyin: Yù Yán

Yu Yan (Chinese: 喻言; born May 26, 1997) is a Chinese singer and actress. She is best known for finishing 4th in the survival show Youth with You 2, making her a member of The9. She is also well known for her sense of fashion and continually garners significant interest from fashion brands because of her style.

== Early life ==
Yu Yan was born on May 26, 1997, in Beijing. She graduated from Beijing College of Politics and Law with a major in Business English. Her mother is an elementary school teacher.

== Career ==
=== 2015–2019: Career beginnings ===
In 2013, Yu Yan signed with Re-Du Media and joined the girl group, True. True later released their first album "刺眼的太阳" in 2015. On November 30, 2015, Yu Yan released her first ever EP, Bad Girl, which consists of 3 songs. She joined Dragon Television's reality-survival program Girls Fighting in 2016. In the finals, she ranked second and was slated to debut as a member of Diamond Girls. However, the group silently disbanded before an official debut.

After her contract expired in 2017, she signed with JoinHall Media. She made her acting debut in the television series Waiting For You In A Long Time and took part in the soundtrack of the series. The two soundtracks, "要不是你" and "Underwater", were released on 13 July 2018. In August 2018, she made her big screen debut in the film, Pet Departures. She played her first main role as Liu Pian. On September 19, 2018, she released her debut album "暮色", which consisted of six songs. In December of the same year, she played Ya Ta in the three part film series, Special Forces Return, namingly Special Forces Return 1: Snow Wolf's Wrath, Return of Special Soldiers: Black Poppy and Special Forces Return 3: Top Secret Battlefield.

=== 2020–present: Youth With You 2, The9 and rise in popularity ===
In 2020, Yu Yan took part in iQiyi's reality-survival program Youth With You 2. One of the two trainees to receive only "A"s in three evaluations, she eventually finished 4th with a total of 7,198,164 votes in the finals and debuted as a member of The9. While on the show, she also participated in Who's the Drama Queen, a spin-off acting variety show for the trainees. She made a cameo appearance on Customer First. In September 2020, Yu Yan became a regular cast member on iQIYI's Let's Party, the first variety show of The9. As of November 2020, the show has since finished airing. In October 2020, Yu Yan injured her ankle during a rehearsal. In the following months, she was absent from The9's group activities in order to recuperate. On November 4, 2020, YuYan Studio was formally established, meant to further Yu Yan's personal career. Released on December 25, 2020, The9's album MatriX features Yu Yan's solo song "薔薇之巔 (Foretold)". She participated in the songwriting process, and in an interview with QQ Music, she discussed choosing the song because she wanted her first solo song with The9 to be lively and cheerful.

In January 2021, Yu Yan graced the cover of ELLE China's first digital issue, further becoming the first idol to be featured. The e-magazine was a special collaboration project between ELLE and young artists and featured artworks by the children. Also in January 2021, Yu Yan returned to The9's group activities to perform live at iQiyi's 2021 Shout Out For Love Gala. However, at some time during the performance, Yu Yan reinjured her ankle, and afterwards again took a short hiatus to recover. Along with The9, she returned to perform "Dumb Dumb Bomb" on Youth With You 3. On March 26 and 27, Yu Yan participated in The9's first live concert, called "X-City". Along with performing multiple of The9's songs, Yu Yan also performed her solo song, "薔薇之巔 (Foretold)", of which she participated in the making of choreography. Her performance was well-received, and she additionally garnered praise on social media for her professional handling of microphone and in-ear malfunctions during her performance on March 26. In an interview with South China Morning Post, of the concert, Yu Yan said, "The concert left an indelible memory."

In April 2021, Yu Yan participated in public welfare activities (Yuyan Rural Revitalization Project) seeking to revitalize rural areas of China. The welfare activities took place in different areas in Qilihe District, with the following project set to provide assistance to rural schools. Following this, she was featured on the cover of ShenZhou Artistic Magazine. Later in the month, along with The9 group members An Qi and Lu Keran, she visited iQiyi's Youth with You 3 as a senior mentor and performed a collaboration stage with some of the trainees. In May 2021, she was featured in magazine spreads such as with WAVES and ROLLACOASTER, which was a birthday exclusive issue featuring only Yu Yan. On May 22, Yu Yan appeared on The9's one year anniversary EP, RefleXtion. Later in the month, Yu Yan's work studio announced the opening of an official YouTube channel and also released four self-produced English song covers as a birthday special for fans.

On June 11, Yu Yan supported the True Love Dream charity project and visited a children's music class at Xingshou School. Two days later, on June 13, 2021, Yu Yan performed at the OCEANWAVE Music Festival in Shanghai. She performed four solo songs, including "Give Me All Night" and a special rock version of "No Company (不奉陪)" from Youth With You 2.

Later that week, on 19 June, Yu Yan's work studio posted a notice that they would be taking legal action against any individuals posting defamatory insults towards Yu Yan online. Represented by AllBright Law Offices, the lawsuit severely reprimands and resists internet rumors and malicious speech targeted at Yu Yan. At midnight on June 26, Yu Yan released a cover of the song "Bygone Love (当爱已成往事)" originally by Sandy Lam and Jonathan Lee. It is available for free on various streaming platforms, including QQ Music.

On July 13, 2021, Yu Yan was a guest on the escape-room themed variety show "GodPlayer". On the 17th of that month, she also participated in Beijing Adoption Day Charity Event, encouraging others to adopt shelter animals as pets.

Yu Yan is expected to perform at Guochao Xingdong Music Festival, which was originally scheduled for August 14, 2021. However, due to rising cases of COVID-19 in China, the event was first postponed until October 2021, before being pushed until sometime in early 2022.

On January 1, 2022, she attended the "Global Chinese Music Awards" jointly organized by CCTV Dream and Xinhua Media, and won the "New Singer of the Year" award. On January 3, she attended the "Starlight Young Annual Charity Gala" and won the "Best New Artist of the Year" award and performed the song "Simple LIFE".

On January 20, the single "The Faraway Place Without a Name", sung with Lou Yixiao, Su Yunying and Wang Ruiqi, was released as the theme song to help the Winter Olympics. On February 14, she was a guest on the "Chinese Music Hit Center" Winter Olympics special show as a hit song guest.

== Discography ==
=== Extended plays ===
Title	Details
暮色	Released: September 19, 2018; Language: Mandarin; Formats: Digital download, streaming; Track listing: 1. "鸚鵡"; 2. "日常愛你"; 3. "我從沒想到會遇見你"; 4. "小心翼翼"; 5. "顯微鏡女孩"; 6. "簡單.LIFE"

=== Single albums ===
Title	Details
Bad Girl	Released: May 23, 2015; Language: Mandarin; Formats: Digital download, streaming; Track listing: 1. "Bad Girl"; 2. "蠢货"; 3. "小偷"
W	Released: May 26, 2022; Language: Mandarin; Formats: Digital download, streaming; Track listing: 1. "Who"; 2. "风吹过的地方你都在"
World (我的)	Released: May 2, 2023; Language: Mandarin; Formats: Digital download, streaming; Track listing: 1. "Black Key; 2. "Walk On A Dream"; 3. "霍德尔"

=== Songs ===
Title	Year	Peak chart position	Note
Title	Year	CHN (Note: The China TME UNI Chart was launched by Tencent Music in 2018 and first published by Billboard in November 2022.)	Note
"Give Me All Night"	2017	—	Non-album single
"薔薇之巔" (Foretold) (Note: Song was released under The9, but a solo release by Yu Yan.)	2020	39	MatriX
"当爱已成往事"	2021	8	Non-album single
"Who"	2022	6	W
"风吹过的地方你都在"	2022	7	W
"Black Key"	2023	8	World (我的)
"Walk On A Dream"	2023	5	World (我的)
"霍德尔"	2023	4	World (我的)
"I Wanna Be Your Slave"	2023	—	Non-album single
"骄傲" (Pride)	2023	200+	Non-album single
"讯号" (under the group name Seven Kids)	2026	82	Non-album single
"焰" (Born of Fire)	2026	5	Non-album single
"—" denotes releases that did not chart or were not released in that region.

=== Soundtrack appearances ===
Title	Year	Peak chart position	Note
Title	Year	CHN	Note
"要不是你"	2018	—	Waiting For You In A Long Time OST
"Underwater"	2018	—	Waiting For You In A Long Time OST
"无名的远方" (The Faraway Place Without a Name)	2022	35	Theme for the 2022 Winter Olympics
"—" denotes releases that did not chart or were not released in that region.

== Filmography ==
=== Film ===
Year	Title		Role	Notes	Ref.
Year	English	Original	Role	Notes	Ref.
2018	Pet Departures	萌寵入殮師	Liu Pian	Main role	
2018	Special Forces Return 1: Snow Wolf's Wrath	特種兵歸來1：血狼之怒	Ya Ta	Main role	
2018	Special Forces Return 2：Black Poppy	特種兵歸來2：黑色罌粟	Ya Ta	Main role	
2018	Special Forces Return 3: Top Secret Battlefield	特種兵歸來3：絕密戰場	Ya Ta	Main role	

=== Television series ===
Year	Title		Network	Role	Notes	Ref.
Year	English	Original	Network	Role	Notes	Ref.
2018	Waiting For You In A Long Time	在悠长的时光里等你	iQIYI	Shen Po	Supporting role	
2020	Customer First	猎心者	iQIYI	Wu Mengyao	Cameo	

=== Television shows ===
Year	Title		Network	Role	Notes	Ref.
Year	English	Original	Network	Role	Notes	Ref.
2016	Girls Fighting	加油美少女	Dragon TV	Contestant		
2020	Youth With You 2	青春有你2	iQIYI	Contestant	Survival show that determined The9 members finished 4th	
2020	Who's the Drama Queen?	青春加点戏	IQIYI	Cast member	Episodes 8, 10	
2020	Let's Party! 2020	非日常派对	IQIYI	Regular member	The9's first variety show	
2021	Youth With You 3	青春有你3	IQIYI	Guest	With The9	
2021	GodPlayer	好虎的密室	Huya Live	Guest		
