= Youth With You season 2 =

2020 Chinese girl group competition show

Youth With You
- Season 2
- Promotional poster
- Starring: Kun; Lisa; Jony J; Ella

Release
- Original network: iQiYi
- Original release: 12 March – 30 May 2020

Season chronology
- ← Previous; Season 1 Next → Season 3

Youth With You (season 2) (Chinese: 《青春有你 2》; pinyin: Qīngchūn Yǒu Nǐ Èr) is a Chinese girl group reality competition show that premiered on 12 March 2020, on the video streaming platform iQiYi. The program was hosted by Cai Xukun, with Lisa, Jony J, and Ella Chen serving as mentors. It featured 109 female trainees from various entertainment companies, who were voted on by viewers. The nine contestants with the highest number of votes in the final episode debuted as members of the girl group The9.

== Overview ==
=== Background ===
Youth With You (season 2) was intended to promote China's contemporary youth culture to overseas audiences.

The series adopted the themes of "interpreting self" and "not defining self," reflecting the trainees' perspectives and experiences during the competition.

=== Format ===
The program featured 109 female trainees who participated in singing and dancing performances over a four-month training and competition period. The final lineup consisted of nine members, selected through votes cast by viewers, referred to as "youth producers."

=== Features ===
The concept of "Concept X," introduced in the series, was intended to highlight the open-ended possibilities for both the program and its trainees. The inclusion of original singer-songwriters and participants from diverse backgrounds was presented as a way to emphasize emotional development, cultural awareness, and life experience, alongside singing and dancing, in the cultivation of young idols.

An "X Mentor" role was also added to broaden the mentor structure and introduce different perspectives to the program. Cai Xukun appeared as the "youth producers' representative," serving as a senior figure who provided professional guidance and emotional support to the trainees.

== Mentors ==
Cai Xukun: Youth producers' representative

Cai Xukun, who debuted after participating in season 1, appeared as the youth producers' representative in season 2. His role was to provide professional guidance and serve as a senior figure for the trainees.

Ella Chen: Music mentor

Ella Chen, a member of the Taiwanese girl group S.H.E, served as the music mentor. With over 19 years of experience in the music industry, she offered trainees both professional advice and personal guidance.

Lalisa Manoban (Lisa): Dance mentor

Lisa, a member of the South Korean girl group Blackpink, was the dance mentor. She was noted for her performance skills and popularity, and she guided trainees in dance and stage presence.

Jony J: Rap mentor

Chinese rapper Jony J served as the rap mentor. Known for his large-scale concerts and distinctive lyrical style, he was described in Chinese media as a "hip-hop poet."

=== X Mentors ===
- Yoga Lin
- Silence Wang
- Wang Ziyi
- Zhu Zhengting
- Wang Linkai

== Contestants ==
Color key

- Top 9 of the week
- Top 9 of the week (Live Votes)
- Left the show
- Eliminated in Episode 9 + Episode 10
- Eliminated in Episode 16
- Eliminated in Episode 20
- Eliminated in Episode 23
- Final members of The9

| Company | Name | Judges Evaluation | | | Rankings | | | | | | | | | | | | | | | |
| Company | Name | 1 | 2 | 3 | E02 | E04 | E06 | E07 | E09 + E10 | | E12 | E13 | E16 | | E18 | E20 | | E23 | | Final |
| Company | Name | 1 | 2 | 3 | # | # | # | # | # | Votes | # | # | # | Votes | # | # | Votes | # | Votes | Final |
|---|---|---|---|---|---|---|---|---|---|---|---|---|---|---|---|---|---|---|---|---|
| Independent Trainees | Chen Jue (陈珏) | B | D | D | 3 | 3 | 4 | 59 | 6 | 15,674,669 | 23 | 43 | 34 | 5,766,709 | 28 | 31 | 574,488 | Eliminated | | 31 |
| Independent Trainees | GoGo Gou Xueying (勾雪莹)^{1, 22, 23} | B | F | B | 34 | 39 | 34 | 75 | 34 | 3,160,007 | 42 | 33 | 48 | Eliminated | | | | | | 48 |
| Independent Trainees | Victoria Li Yichen (李依宸)^{20} | F | B | D | 63 | 42 | 45 | 17 | 38 | 2,979,986 | 44 | 40 | 37 | 4,680,049 | Eliminated | | | | | 37 |
| Independent Trainees | Ranee Wang Wanchen (王婉辰) | D | D | D | 100 | 57 | 52 | 57 | 48 | 1,868,902 | 58 | 57 | 59 | Eliminated | | | | | | 59 |
| Independent Trainees | Zoe Wang Xinyu (王欣宇) | C | A | B | 6 | 9 | 14 | 2 | 18 | 6,571,917 | 48 | 49 | 52 | Eliminated | | | | | | 52 |
| Independent Trainees | Xia Yan (夏研) | B | F | C | 67 | 30 | 15 | 108 | 16 | 7,692,316 | 28 | 39 | 43 | Eliminated | | | | | | 43 |
| Independent Trainees | Pumpkin Xu Baiyi (徐百仪) | B | F | D | 107 | 77 | 90 | 106 | Eliminated | | | | | | | | | | | 64 - 107 |
| Independent Trainees | Bunny Zhang Chuhan (张楚寒)^{1, 27} | B | D | A | 27 | 41 | 29 | 46 | 22 | 4,881,792 | 24 | 34 | 27 | 6,105,616 | 23 | 27 | 756,954 | Eliminated | | 27 |
| Independent Trainees | Ma Shujun (马蜀君) | B | C | A | 25 | 36 | 40 | 25 | 44 | 2,099,233 | 47 | 47 | 51 | Eliminated | | | | | | 51 |
| LadyBees Multimedia (姊妹淘) | Yeong Quan Xiaoying (权笑迎)^{12} | C | D | F | 85 | 99 | 105 | 49 | Eliminated | | | | | | | | | | | 64 - 107 |
| AMG Asia Music Group (AMG亚洲音乐集团) | XIN Liu Yuxin (刘雨昕)^{8} | A | B | A | 23 | 16 | 11 | 12 | 8 | 13,103,742 | 6 | 1 | 2 | 19,881,885 | 1 | 1 | 9,269,840 | 1 | 17,359,242 | 1 |
| ByMoon Entertainment (百沐娱乐) | Juicy Zuo Zhuo (左卓) | C | C | D | 52 | 48 | 62 | 28 | 50 | 1,697,229 | 39 | 19 | 35 | 5,731,387 | 28 | 29 | 629,906 | Eliminated | | 29 |
| Banana Entertainment (香蕉娱乐) | Lin Huibo (林慧博) | B | C | B | 96 | 103 | 103 | 26 | Eliminated | | | | | | | | | | | 64 - 107 |
| Banana Entertainment (香蕉娱乐) | Du Ziyi (杜紫怡) | C | F | F | 81 | 102 | 104 | 99 | Eliminated | | | | | | | | | | | 64 - 107 |
| Banana Entertainment (香蕉娱乐) | Su Qinrou (粟钦柔) | D | D | D | 83 | 78 | 85 | 61 | Eliminated | | | | | | | | | | | 64 - 107 |
| Banana Entertainment (香蕉娱乐) | Sophia Wang Shuhui (王姝慧) | B | F | B | 57 | 60 | 61 | 72 | Eliminated | | | | | | | | | | | 64 - 107 |
| South Fest (美丽南方) | Eileen Ai Lin (艾霖) | D | F | F | 55 | 88 | 100 | 106 | Eliminated | | | | | | | | | | | 64 - 107 |
| JNERA Cultural Media (嘉纳盛世) | Shaking Chloe Xie Keyin (谢可寅)^{19, 23, 26} | B | A | A | 32 | 44 | 13 | 1 | 7 | 15,550,407 | 3 | 8 | 4 | 18,730,191 | 8 | 9 | 2,266,826 | 5 | 6,826,411 | 5 |
| M.Nation (辰星娱乐) | Meddhi Fu Ruqiao (傅如乔) | B | D | C | 66 | 71 | 33 | 70 | 23 | 4,526,937 | 25 | 29 | 32 | 5,836,290 | 33 | 33 | 468,245 | Eliminated | | 33 |
| Cool Young Entertainment (酷漾娱乐) | Flora Dai Yanni (戴燕妮)^{21} | A | B | B | 33 | 38 | 38 | 21 | 27 | 3,922,698 | 18 | 17 | 17 | 7,837,502 | 23 | 19 | 1,524,942 | 20 | 425,660 | 20 |
| Mon Young Pictures (萌样影视) | Duan Xiaowei (段小薇) | A | D | D | 44 | 40 | 42 | 43 | 60 | 1,440,421 | 55 | 49 | 54 | Eliminated | | | | | | 54 |
| Mon Young Pictures (萌样影视) | Kiki Wei Qiqi (魏奇奇) | B | F | C | 78 | 73 | 78 | 75 | Eliminated | | | | | | | | | | | 64 - 107 |
| D·Wang Entertainment (大王娱乐) | Yvonne Wang Qing (王清) | A | F | C | 69 | 15 | 16 | 90 | 17 | 6,903,303 | 31 | 36 | 45 | Eliminated | | | | | | 45 |
| D·Wang Entertainment (大王娱乐) | Zhang Yu (张钰) | B | B | C | 59 | 13 | 12 | 10 | 13 | 9,761,397 | 17 | 45 | 28 | 5,999,903 | 16 | 32 | 531,461 | Eliminated | | 32 |
| One Cool Jacso (天加一) | Eva Yao Yifan (姚依凡) | F | F | D | 106 | 82 | 96 | 91 | Eliminated | | | | | | | | | | | 64 - 107 |
| One Cool Jacso (天加一) | Jennifer Zhou Ziqian (周梓倩)^{23, 24} | C | C | F | 38 | 53 | 57 | 36 | Eliminated | | | | | | | | | | | 64 - 107 |
| Mars Digital Entertainment (火星数娱) | Luna Qin-Niu Zhengwei (秦牛正威) | D | C | F | 16 | 27 | 39 | 22 | 43 | 2,296,250 | 49 | 36 | 42 | Eliminated | | | | | | 42 |
| Mars Digital Entertainment (火星数娱) | ET Yang Yutong (杨宇彤) | C | A | C | 101 | 98 | 94 | 7 | Eliminated | | | | | | | | | | | 64 - 107 |
| Encore Music (梦想青春音乐) | Cheng Manxin (程曼鑫) | D | B | C | 58 | 43 | 55 | 20 | Eliminated | | | | | | | | | | | 64 - 107 |
| Feibao Media (飞宝传媒) | Rio Wang Rui (汪睿)^{18} | D | F | C | 76 | 74 | 87 | 73 | Eliminated | | | | | | | | | | | 64 - 107 |
| Hot Idol (好好榜样) | Wang Yaoyao (王瑶瑶) | C | F | F | 86 | 106 | 91 | 102 | Eliminated | | | | | | | | | | | 64 - 107 |
| Hot Idol (好好榜样) | Roada Xu Ziyin (徐紫茵) | B | D | D | 60 | 49 | 48 | 50 | 29 | 3,781,068 | 36 | 30 | 19 | 7,121,596 | 19 | 16 | 1,596,906 | 18 | 663,681 | 18 |
| Alliance Art Group (合纵文化) | Shen Bing (申冰) | C | F | D | 64 | 75 | | 94 | Left the show | | | | | | | | | | | |
| Alliance Art Group (合纵文化) | Shen Qing (申清) | C | F | F | 80 | 89 | 98 | 99 | Eliminated | | | | | | | | | | | 64 - 107 |
| Alliance Art Group (合纵文化) | Shen Yu (申玉) | C | F | F | 77 | 83 | 95 | 102 | Eliminated | | | | | | | | | | | 64 - 107 |
| Alliance Art Group (合纵文化) | Shen Jie (申洁) | C | C | C | 82 | 90 | 99 | 24 | Eliminated | | | | | | | | | | | 64 - 107 |
| Hedgehog Brothers Entertainment (刺猬兄弟) | Hamy He Meiyan (何美延)^{17} | B | D | D | 40 | 56 | 70 | 44 | Eliminated | | | | | | | | | | | 64 - 107 |
| Hippo Film (河马影业) | Sunny Jin Yangyang (靳阳阳) | D | D | D | 49 | 64 | 63 | 62 | 42 | 2,392,191 | 57 | 49 | 57 | Eliminated | | | | | | 57 |
| Hippo Film (河马影业) | Monster Sun Meinan (孙美楠) | C | D | F | 105 | 92 | 93 | 64 | 58 | 1,484,155 | 59 | 59 | 55 | Eliminated | | | | | | 55 |
| Hippo Film (河马影业) | Zizi Xu Zhenzhen (徐轸轸) | C | C | D | 104 | 94 | 50 | 27 | 40 | 2,939,084 | 54 | 49 | 36 | Eliminated | | | | | | 36 |
| Hippo Film (河马影业) | Zhang Menglu (张梦露) | D | F | F | 84 | 107 | 66 | 97 | 56 | 1,521,792 | 60 | 57 | 60 | Eliminated | | | | | | 60 |
| Huace Pictures (华策影视) | Esther Yu Shuxin (虞书欣) | D | D | D | 1 | 1 | 1 | 48 | 1 | 33,686,071 | 1 | 5 | 1 | 24,753,946 | 3 | 2 | 7,247,276 | 2 | 12,963,420 | 2 |
| Huayi Brothers (华谊兄弟时尚) | Uah Liu Yanan (刘亚楠) | D | D | D | 93 | 87 | 89 | 67 | Eliminated | | | | | | | | | | | 64 - 107 |
| Love & Peace (鹭蒲印象) | Aishah Ayisha (阿依莎) | F | F | F | 54 | 91 | 101 | 86 | Eliminated | | | | | | | | | | | 64 - 107 |
| JoinHall Media (嘉会传媒) | Yu Yan (喻言)^{23} | A | A | A | 30 | 31 | 21 | 8 | 15 | 8,474,607 | 4 | 4 | 3 | 18,877,092 | 2 | 3 | 3,744,958 | 4 | 7,198,164 | 4 |
| Jaywalk Newjoy (嘉行新悦) | Poppy Liu Haihan (刘海涵) | D | F | D | 102 | 97 | 106 | 83 | Eliminated | | | | | | | | | | | 64 - 107 |
| Jaywalk Newjoy (嘉行新悦) | Tonkey Tang Keyi (唐珂伊) | D | F | D | 92 | 105 | 97 | 88 | Eliminated | | | | | | | | | | | 64 - 107 |
| Jaywalk Newjoy (嘉行新悦) | Yealy Wang Yale (王雅乐) | C | F | F | 91 | 80 | 79 | 80 | Eliminated | | | | | | | | | | | 64 - 107 |
| Jaywalk Newjoy (嘉行新悦) | Bubble Zhu Linyu (朱林雨) | C | C | B | 62 | 58 | 47 | 35 | 45 | 2,028,777 | 34 | 21 | 31 | 5,875,621 | 28 | 34 | 306,691 | Eliminated | | 34 |
| Lionheart Entertainment (莱恩娱乐) | Kelly Lin Weixi (林韦希) | C | F | B | 28 | 47 | 56 | 95 | Eliminated | | | | | | | | | | | 64 - 107 |
| Lehui Media (乐辉文化) | Jacqueline Zhang Tianxin (张天馨) | B | C | C | 103 | 96 | 107 | 36 | Eliminated | | | | | | | | | | | 64 - 107 |
| Good@ Media (点赞传播) | Hana Lin Xiaozhai (林小宅) | F | D | D | 18 | 26 | 31 | 52 | 31 | 3,604,200 | 21 | 54 | 33 | 5,828,420 | 28 | 35 | 303,854 | Eliminated | | 35 |
| Maninquin Entertainment (麦尼肯娱乐) | Joey Cai Zhuoyi (蔡卓宜) | F | B | D | 5 | 5 | 7 | 14 | 11 | 11,676,005 | 16 | 40 | 26 | 6,137,060 | 35 | 25 | 810,274 | Eliminated | | 25 |
| Mountain Top Entertainment (泰洋川禾) | Snow Kong Xueer (孔雪儿)^{8} | A | C | B | 10 | 8 | 9 | 38 | 9 | 12,490,825 | 8 | 12 | 8 | 15,081,039 | 6 | 5 | 3,023,912 | 8 | 4,001,966 | 8 |
| Mountain Top Entertainment (泰洋川禾) | Zhao Xiaotang (赵小棠) | C | D | C | 61 | 10 | 3 | 42 | 3 | 26,213,105 | 2 | 16 | 5 | 16,934,529 | 11 | 6 | 2,910,490 | 7 | 4,392,255 | 7 |
| M+ Entertainment (木加互娱) | Yennis Huang Xinyuan (黄欣苑) | B | F | D | 72 | 81 | 77 | 99 | 51 | 1,666,425 | 53 | 56 | 58 | Eliminated | | | | | | 58 |
| M+ Entertainment (木加互娱) | Nikita Huang Yiming (黄一鸣) | F | F | F | 70 | 93 | 80 | 75 | Eliminated | | | | | | | | | | | 64 - 107 |
| M+ Entertainment (木加互娱) | Yuni Xiong Yuqing (熊钰清) | D | F | C | 95 | 100 | 86 | 75 | Eliminated | | | | | | | | | | | 61 - 63 |
| OACA (觉醒东方) | Aurora Ouruola (欧若拉)^{3} | B | F | D | 50 | 61 | 65 | 109 | Eliminated | | | | | | | | | | | 64 - 107 |
| OACA (觉醒东方) | Liu Lingzi (刘令姿) | B | A | B | 39 | 28 | 36 | 6 | 25 | 4,369,857 | 12 | 14 | 10 | 12,475,771 | 13 | 11 | 1,824,686 | 14 | 2,026,721 | 14 |
| OACA (觉醒东方) | Milla Mi La (米拉) | B | F | C | 87 | 101 | 102 | 104 | Eliminated | | | | | | | | | | | 64 - 107 |
| OACA (觉醒东方) | Seven Zou Siyang (邹思扬) | B | D | D | 90 | 70 | 58 | 65 | Eliminated | | | | | | | | | | | 64 - 107 |
| OACA (觉醒东方) | Jenny Zeng Keni (曾可妮)^{23, 25} | B | D | B | 42 | 32 | 37 | 53 | 39 | 2,956,779 | 20 | 15 | 16 | 7,950,632 | 12 | 20 | 1,468,660 | 13 | 2,496,982 | 13 |
| Off/Shore Music (海盗音乐) | GIA Jin Jiya (金吉雅) | C | D | F | 97 | 85 | 67 | 57 | Eliminated | | | | | | | | | | | 64 - 107 |
| Second Culture | NaHo Qisui (七穗) | F | D | B | 43 | 22 | 24 | 51 | 28 | 3,824,899 | 40 | 8 | 41 | Eliminated | | | | | | 41 |
| Show City Times (少城时代) | Han Dong (韩东)^{2} | C | F | D | 56 | 62 | 64 | 82 | 59 | 1,474,778 | 56 | 49 | 56 | Eliminated | | | | | | 56 |
| Show City Times (少城时代) | BeeBee Huang Xiaoyun (黄小芸) | D | C | D | 48 | 72 | 83 | 29 | Eliminated | | | | | | | | | | | 61 - 63 |
| Show City Times (少城时代) | Wei Shuyu (未书羽) | D | F | F | 89 | 108 | 75 | 105 | Eliminated | | | | | | | | | | | 64 - 107 |
| Show City Times (少城时代) | Xu Xinwen (许馨文)^{19} | B | A | B | 79 | 95 | 84 | 5 | 57 | 1,494,488 | 29 | 30 | 21 | 6,682,878 | 19 | 28 | 667,885 | Eliminated | | 28 |
| Shengyuan Inter Entertainment (圣元互娱) | Feng Ruohang (冯若航)^{10} | B | F | D | 46 | 51 | 49 | 88 | 47 | 1,910,418 | 38 | 43 | 44 | Eliminated | | | | | | 44 |
| Shengyuan Inter Entertainment (圣元互娱) | Lynn Zhou Lincong (周琳聪)^{10} | D | D | D | 98 | 76 | 74 | 65 | Eliminated | | | | | | | | | | | 64 - 107 |
| Shengyuan Inter Entertainment (圣元互娱) | Zha Yichen (查祎琛)^{10} | D | F | B | 75 | 69 | 71 | 83 | Eliminated | | | | | | | | | | | 64 - 107 |
| Channy Dynasty (诚利千代) | Joy Zhuoyinamu (卓依娜姆) | C | F | C | 74 | 84 | 92 | 86 | Eliminated | | | | | | | | | | | 64 - 107 |
| Shanghai Star48 Culture Media Group SNH48 (丝芭传媒) | DDD Duan Yixuan (段艺璇) | D | C | C | 12 | 12 | 17 | 22 | 19 | 6,036,152 | 15 | 28 | 30 | 5,914,313 | 23 | 24 | 1,063,228 | Eliminated | | 24 |
| Shanghai Star48 Culture Media Group SNH48 (丝芭传媒) | Air Su Shanshan (苏杉杉) | D | D | F | 26 | 34 | 41 | 70 | 46 | 1,951,266 | 43 | 30 | 40 | Eliminated | | | | | | 40 |
| Shanghai Star48 Culture Media Group SNH48 (丝芭传媒) | Momo Mo Han (莫寒)^{4} | D | B | D | 14 | 24 | 28 | 19 | 35 | 3,114,838 | 45 | 24 | 22 | 6,531,556 | 28 | 22 | 1,346,020 | Eliminated | | 22 |
| Shanghai Star48 Culture Media Group SNH48 (丝芭传媒) | Fei Qinyuan (费沁源)^{6} | D | C | C | 13 | 14 | 23 | 40 | 32 | 3,454,683 | 30 | 13 | 38 | 3,516,635 | Eliminated | | | | | 38 |
| Shanghai Star48 Culture Media Group SNH48 (丝芭传媒) | Song Xinran (宋昕冉)^{9} | D | B | D | 22 | 35 | 35 | 13 | 36 | 3,024,908 | 22 | 22 | 18 | 7,171,382 | 16 | 18 | 1,526,422 | 19 | 527,806 | 19 |
| Shanghai Star48 Culture Media Group SNH48 (丝芭传媒) | Three Sun Rui (孙芮)^{4} | D | D | F | 21 | 23 | 32 | 56 | 33 | 3,180,838 | 19 | 10 | 15 | 7,998,825 | 26 | 17 | 1,575,423 | 17 | 888,626 | 17 |
| Shanghai Star48 Culture Media Group SNH48_7SENSES (丝芭传媒) | Diamond Dai Meng (戴萌)^{5} | B | C | C | 9 | 11 | 18 | 29 | 24 | 4,432,504 | 32 | 6 | 20 | 6,781,500 | 19 | 12 | 1,761,120 | 15 | 1,409,591 | 15 |
| Shanghai Star48 Culture Media Group SNH48_7SENSES (丝芭传媒) | Kiki Xu Jiaqi (许佳琪)^{5} | A | B | B | 2 | 2 | 2 | 18 | 2 | 26,367,723 | 7 | 2 | 7 | 16,302,745 | 4 | 4 | 3,116,652 | 3 | 9,086,752 | 3 |
| Shanghai Star48 Culture Media Group SNH48_7SENSES (丝芭传媒) | Eliwa Xu-Yang Yuzhuo (许杨玉琢)^{5} | C | B | B | 20 | 17 | 26 | 16 | 37 | 3,011,918 | 26 | 45 | 23 | 6,359,235 | 27 | 30 | 580,700 | Eliminated | | 30 |
| Shanghai Star48 Culture Media Group SNH48_7SENSES (丝芭传媒) | Tako Zhang Yuge (张语格)^{5} | C | C | C | 17 | 19 | 25 | 32 | 30 | 3,613,717 | 37 | 20 | 24 | 6,303,740 | 13 | 23 | 1,107,925 | Eliminated | | 23 |
| Shangyue Culture AKB48 Team SH (尚越文化) | Anne Hu Xinyin (胡馨尹)^{16} | D | C | C | 15 | 25 | 30 | 41 | 41 | 2,657,578 | 51 | 26 | 49 | Eliminated | | | | | | 49 |
| Shangyue Culture AKB48 Team SH (尚越文化) | Kuliko Shen Ying (沈莹)^{16} | D | D | D | 36 | 52 | 59 | 60 | Eliminated | | | | | | | | | | | 64 - 107 |
| Star Master Entertainment (匠星娱乐) | Babymonster An Qi (安崎)^{11} | A | A | A | 8 | 4 | 5 | 3 | 4 | 20,385,126 | 5 | 3 | 6 | 16,811,225 | 7 | 8 | 2,584,154 | 6 | 4,488,806 | 6 |
| Star Master Entertainment (匠星娱乐) | Verlina Mo Yao (墨谣)^{11} | B | F | D | 45 | 65 | 73 | 85 | Eliminated | | | | | | | | | | | 64 - 107 |
| Star Master Entertainment (匠星娱乐) | Frhanm Shangguan Xiai (上官喜爱)^{11} | A | D | A | 4 | 6 | 6 | 62 | 10 | 11,985,001 | 13 | 18 | 14 | 8,092,789 | 16 | 15 | 1,624,187 | 16 | 950,607 | 16 |
| Star Master Entertainment (匠星娱乐) | Shirley Wen Zhe (文哲)^{11} | B | F | D | 31 | 45 | 54 | 75 | Eliminated | | | | | | | | | | | 61 - 63 |
| Shining Star Entertainment (曜星文化) | Jane Wang Siyu (王思予)^{14} | B | D | D | 65 | 55 | 51 | 69 | Eliminated | | | | | | | | | | | 64 - 107 |
| Shining Star Entertainment (曜星文化) | Vicky Wei Chen (魏辰)^{14} | B | D | B | 53 | 50 | 46 | 55 | 52 | 1,603,885 | 50 | 22 | 46 | Eliminated | | | | | | 46 |
| Yizong Cultural (一综星船) | Lil Reta Fu Jia (符佳)^{13} | A | F | F | 88 | 104 | 72 | 95 | Eliminated | | | | | | | | | | | 64 - 107 |
| Gramarie Entertainment (果然娱乐) | Jessie Fu Yaning (符雅凝) | C | D | D | 37 | 37 | 43 | 47 | 54 | 1,536,859 | 52 | 35 | 53 | Eliminated | | | | | | 53 |
| Gramarie Entertainment (果然娱乐) | Gia Ge Xinyi (葛鑫怡) | C | D | B | 41 | 21 | 22 | 68 | 26 | 4,231,092 | 35 | 54 | 29 | 5,920,612 | 33 | 26 | 787,975 | Eliminated | | 26 |
| Gramarie Entertainment (果然娱乐) | Dolly Zhang Luofei (张洛菲) | D | D | D | 71 | 68 | 76 | 54 | Eliminated | | | | | | | | | | | 64 - 107 |
| TOV Entertainment (TOV娱乐) | Marco Lin Fan (林凡)^{7} | C | A | C | 11 | 18 | 20 | 4 | 20 | 5,556,927 | 27 | 38 | 25 | 6,231,617 | 13 | 21 | 1,363,241 | Eliminated | | 21 |
| TOV Entertainment (TOV娱乐) | K Lu Keran (陆柯燃)^{7} | B | C | C | 7 | 7 | 10 | 29 | 12 | 11,149,098 | 14 | 24 | 13 | 9,004,793 | 5 | 14 | 1,745,701 | 9 | 3,788,898 | 9 |
| TOV Entertainment (TOV娱乐) | Hazel Chen Yiwen (陈艺文) | C | F | C | 51 | 67 | 81 | 93 | Eliminated | | | | | | | | | | | 64 - 107 |
| TPG Culture (TPG文创) | JU Chen Pinxuan (陈品瑄) | B | B | C | 73 | 66 | 69 | 15 | 53 | 1,556,732 | 41 | 60 | 47 | Eliminated | | | | | | 47 |
| TPG Culture (TPG文创) | Sharon Wang Chengxuan (王承渲) | B | D | A | 94 | 20 | 8 | 44 | 5 | 16,233,689 | 11 | 27 | 12 | 10,690,331 | 22 | 13 | 1,749,147 | 12 | 3,348,299 | 12 |
| TPG Culture (TPG文创) | Sheen Wang Xinming (王心茗) | C | F | D | 108 | 54 | 68 | 97 | Eliminated | | | | | | | | | | | 64 - 107 |
| TPG Culture (TPG文创) | Theia Zheng Yuxin (郑玉歆) | C | C | A | 99 | 86 | 88 | 39 | Eliminated | | | | | | | | | | | 64 - 107 |
| WR/OC | NINEONE Naiwan (乃万)^{17} | C | A | C | 24 | 33 | 19 | 9 | 14 | 9,128,308 | 10 | 7 | 11 | 11,589,891 | 10 | 10 | 2,060,592 | 10 | 3,585,863 | 10 |
| Happy Jump Culture (祥跃文化) | Bobo Li Xining (李熙凝)^{15} | F | F | | | | | 91 | Left the show | | | | | | | | | | | |
| Yuehua Entertainment (乐华娱乐) | Vivi Chen Xinwei (陈昕葳) | C | C | F | 29 | 46 | 44 | 34 | 55 | 1,528,067 | 46 | 40 | 50 | Eliminated | | | | | | 50 |
| Yuehua Entertainment (乐华娱乐) | Aria Jin Zihan (金子涵) | C | C | C | 19 | 29 | 27 | 32 | 21 | 5,187,321 | 9 | 10 | 9 | 13,810,155 | 9 | 7 | 2,671,000 | 11 | 3,585,858 | 11 |
| Yuehua Entertainment (乐华娱乐) | Kay Song Zhaoyi (宋昭艺)^{1} | C | B | B | 47 | 63 | 53 | 10 | 49 | 1,741,529 | 33 | 47 | 39 | Eliminated | | | | | | 39 |
| Yuehua Entertainment (乐华娱乐) | Thea Xiya (希娅) | C | F | F | 68 | 79 | 82 | 73 | Eliminated | | | | | | | | | | | 64 - 107 |
| Yuehua Entertainment (乐华娱乐) | Ree Ai Yiyi (艾依依)^{1} | C | F | D | 35 | 59 | 60 | 81 | Eliminated | | | | | | | | | | | 64 - 107 |

=== Contestant notes ===
1. : Former contestant on Produce 101 China
2. : Member of Dreamcatcher
3. : Member of Nature
4. : Member of BlueV (Unit by SNH48)
5. : Member of 7SENSES (Unit by SNH48)
6. : Member of Color Girls (Unit by SNH48)
7. : Member of Fanxy Red
8. : Member of Lady Bees
9. : Former contestant on The Chinese Youth
10. : Member of OYT GIRLS
11. : Member of Hickey
12. : Trainee under Lady Bees
13. : Under a subsidiary label of Starship Entertainment
14. : Under a subsidiary label of YG Entertainment
15. : Former member of SHY48
16. : Member of AKB48 Team SH
17. : Former contestant on The Rap of China
18. : Former contestant on Chinese Idol
19. : Former contestant on The Next Top Bang
20. : Former contestant on The Coming One Girls under the name Li Mo (李茉)
21. : Member of Yep Girls
22. : Member of MOI Girls
23. : Former contestant on Girls, Fighting
24. : Member of ACEMAX-RED
25. : Former trainee under Banana Culture's Trainee 18
26. : Former member of LEGAL HIGH
27. : Former member of HelloGirls

=== Top 9 ===
| # | Episode 2 | Episode 4 | Episode 6 | Episode 7 (Live Votes) | Episode 10 | Episode 12 | Episode 13 (Live Votes) | Episode 16 | Episode 18 (Live Votes) | Episode 20 | Episode 23 |
|---|---|---|---|---|---|---|---|---|---|---|---|
| 1 | Esther Yu Shuxin (虞书欣) | Esther Yu Shuxin (虞书欣) | Esther Yu Shuxin (虞书欣) | Shaking Xie Keyin (谢可寅) | Esther Yu Shuxin (虞书欣) | Esther Yu Shuxin (虞书欣) | XIN Liu Yuxin (刘雨昕) | Esther Yu Shuxin (虞书欣) | XIN Liu Yuxin (刘雨昕) | XIN Liu Yuxin (刘雨昕) | XIN Liu Yuxin (刘雨昕) |
| 2 | Kiki Xu Jiaqi (许佳琪) | Kiki Xu Jiaqi (许佳琪) | Kiki Xu Jiaqi (许佳琪) | Zoe Wang Xinyu (王欣宇) | Kiki Xu Jiaqi (许佳琪) | Zhao Xiaotang (赵小棠) | Kiki Xu Jiaqi (许佳琪) | XIN Liu Yuxin (刘雨昕) | Yu Yan (喻言) | Esther Yu Shuxin (虞书欣) | Esther Yu Shuxin (虞书欣) |
| 3 | Chen Jue (陈珏) | Chen Jue (陈珏) | Zhao Xiaotang (赵小棠) | Babymonster An Qi (安崎) | Zhao Xiaotang (赵小棠) | Shaking Xie Keyin (谢可寅) | Babymonster An Qi (安崎) | Yu Yan (喻言) | Esther Yu Shuxin (虞书欣) | Yu Yan (喻言) | Kiki Xu Jiaqi (许佳琪) |
| 4 | Frhanm Shangguan Xiai (上官喜爱) | Babymonster An Qi (安崎) | Chen Jue (陈珏) | Marco Lin Fan (林凡) | Babymonster An Qi (安崎) | Yu Yan (喻言) | Yu Yan (喻言) | Shaking Xie Keyin (谢可寅) | Kiki Xu Jiaqi (许佳琪) | Kiki Xu Jiaqi (许佳琪) | Yu Yan (喻言) |
| 5 | Joey Cai Zhuoyi (蔡卓宜) | Joey Cai Zhuoyi (蔡卓宜) | Babymonster An Qi (安崎) | Xu Xinwen (许馨文) | Sharon Wang Chengxuan (王承渲) | Babymonster An Qi (安崎) | Esther Yu Shuxin (虞书欣) | Zhao Xiaotang (赵小棠) | K Lu Keran (陆柯燃) | Snow Kong Xueer (孔雪儿) | Shaking Xie Keyin (谢可寅) |
| 6 | Zoe Wang Xinyu (王欣宇) | Frhanm Shangguan Xiai (上官喜爱) | Frhanm Shangguan Xiai (上官喜爱) | Liu Lingzi (刘令姿) | Chen Jue (陈珏) | XIN Liu Yuxin (刘雨昕) | Diamond Dai Meng (戴萌) | Babymonster An Qi (安崎) | Snow Kong Xueer (孔雪儿) | Zhao Xiaotang (赵小棠) | Babymonster An Qi (安崎) |
| 7 | K Lu Keran (陆柯燃) | K Lu Keran (陆柯燃) | Joey Cai Zhuoyi (蔡卓宜) | ET Yang Yutong (杨宇彤) | Shaking Xie Keyin (谢可寅) | Kiki Xu Jiaqi (许佳琪) | NINEONE Nai Wan (乃万) | Kiki Xu Jiaqi (许佳琪) | Babymonster An Qi (安崎) | Aria Jin Zihan (金子涵) | Zhao Xiaotang (赵小棠) |
| 8 | Babymonster An Qi (安崎) | Snow Kong Xueer (孔雪儿) | Sharon Wang Chengxuan (王承渲) | Yu Yan (喻言) | XIN Liu Yuxin (刘雨昕) | Snow Kong Xueer (孔雪儿) | NaHo Qi Sui (七穗) | Snow Kong Xueer (孔雪儿) | Shaking Xie Keyin (谢可寅) | Babymonster An Qi (安崎) | Snow Kong Xueer (孔雪儿) |
| 9 | Diamond Dai Meng (戴萌) | Zoe Wang Xinyu (王欣宇) | Snow Kong Xueer (孔雪儿) | NINEONE Nai Wan (乃万) | Snow Kong Xueer (孔雪儿) | Aria Jin Zihan (金子涵) | Shaking Xie Keyin (谢可寅) | Aria Jin Zihan (金子涵) | Aria Jin Zihan (金子涵) | Shaking Xie Keyin (谢可寅) | K Lu Keran (陆柯燃) |

=== Elimination Chart ===
Color key

| Final members of The9 |
| Contestants eliminated in the final episode |
| Contestants eliminated in the third elimination round |
| Contestants eliminated in the second elimination round |
| Contestants eliminated in the first elimination round |
| Contestants left the show |

Youth With You season 2 contestants
| XIN Liu Yuxin (刘雨昕) | Esther Yu Shuxin (虞书欣) | Kiki Xu Jiaqi (许佳琪) | Yu Yan (喻言) | Shaking Chloe Xie Keyin (谢可寅) |
| Babymonster An Qi (安崎) | Zhao Xiaotang (赵小棠) | Snow Kong Xueer (孔雪儿) | K Lu Keran (陆柯燃) | NINEONE Nai Wan (乃万) |
| Aria Jin Zihan (金子涵) | Sharon Wang Chengxuan (王承渲) | Jenny Zeng Keni (曾可妮) | Liu Lingzi (刘令姿) | Diamond Dai Meng (戴萌) |
| Frhanm Shangguan Xiai (上官喜爱) | Three Sun Rui (孙芮) | Roada Xu Ziyin (徐紫茵) | Song Xinran (宋昕冉) | Flora Dai Yanni (戴燕妮) |
| Marco Lin Fan (林凡) | Momo Mo Han (莫寒) | Tako Zhang Yuge (张语格) | DDD Duan Yixuan (段艺璇) | Joey Cai Zhuoyi (蔡卓宜) |
| Gia Ge Xinyi (葛鑫怡) | Bunny Zhang Chuhan (张楚寒) | Xu Xinwen (许馨文) | Juicy Zuo Zhuo (左卓) | Eliwa Xuyang Yuzhuo (许杨玉琢) |
| Chen Jue (陈珏) | Zhang Yu (张钰) | Meddhi Fu Ruqiao (傅如乔) | Bubble Zhu Linyu (朱林雨) | Hana Lin Xiaozhai (林小宅) |
| Zizi Xu Zhenzhen (徐轸轸) | Victoria Li Yichen (李依宸) | Fei Qinyuan (费沁源) | Kay Song Zhaoyi (宋昭艺) | Air Su Shanshan (苏杉杉) |
| NaHo Qi Sui (七穗) | Luna Qinniu Zhengwei (秦牛正威) | Xia Yan (夏研) | Feng Ruohang (冯若航) | Yvonne Wang Qing (王清) |
| Vicky Wei Chen (魏辰) | JU Chen Pinxuan (陈品瑄) | GoGo Gou Xueying (勾雪莹) | Anne Hu Xinyin (胡馨尹) | Vivi Chen Xinwei (陈昕葳) |
| Ma Shujun (马蜀君) | Zoe Wang Xinyu (王欣宇) | Jessie Fu Yaning (符雅凝) | Duan Xiaowei (段小薇) | Monster Sun Meinan (孙美楠) |
| Han Dong (韩东) | Sunny Jin Yangyang (靳阳阳) | Yennis Huang Xinyuan (黄欣苑) | Ranee Wang Wanchen (王婉辰) | Zhang Menglu (张梦露) |
| Shirley Wen Zhe (文哲) | BeeBee Huang Xiaoyun (黄小芸) | Yuni Xiong Yuqing (熊钰清) | Jane Wang Siyu (王思予) | Cheng Manxin (程曼鑫) |
| Kelly Lin Weixi (林韦希) | Jennifer Zhou Ziqian (周梓倩) | Seven Zou Siyang (邹思扬) | Kuliko Shen Ying (沈莹) | Ree Ai Yiyi (艾依依) |
| Sophia Wang Shuhui (王姝慧) | Aurora (欧若拉) | GIA Jin Jiya (金吉雅) | Sheen Wang Xinming (王心茗) | Hamy He Meiyan (何美延) |
| Zha Yichen (查祎琛) | Lil Reta Fu Jia (符佳) | Verlina Mo Yao (墨谣) | Lynn Zhou Lincong (周琳聪) | Wei Shuyu (未书羽) |
| Dolly Zhang Luofei (张洛菲) | Kiki Wei Qiqi (魏奇奇) | Yealy Wang Yale (王雅乐) | Nikita Huang Yiming (黄一鸣) | Hazel Chen Yiwen (陈艺文) |
| Thea Xi Ya (希娅) | Su Qinrou (粟钦柔) | Rio Wang Rui (汪睿) | Theia Zheng Yuxin (郑玉歆) | Uah Liu Yanan (刘亚楠) |
| Pumpkin Xu Baiyi (徐百仪) | Wang Yaoyao (王瑶瑶) | Joy Zhuoyi Namu (卓依娜姆) | ET Yang Yutong (杨宇彤) | Shen Yu (申玉) |
| Eva Yao Yifan (姚依凡) | Tonkey Tang Keyi (唐珂伊) | Shen Qing (申清) | Shen Jie (申洁) | Eileen Ai Lin (艾霖) |
| Aishah A Yisha (阿依莎) | Milla Mi La (米拉) | Lin Huibo (林慧博) | Du Ziyi (杜紫怡) | Yeong Quan Xiaoying (权笑迎) |
| Poppy Liu Haihan (刘海涵) | Jacqueline Zhang Tianxin (张天馨) | Shen Bing (申冰) | Bobo Li Xining (李熙凝) | |

== Episodes ==
=== Episode 1 (12 March 2020) ===
The four mentors arrived at a welcome party where they met the 109 trainees. In previous seasons, mentors first encountered the trainees during the preliminary rating stage; however, in this season they met in advance to learn more about the trainees' personalities and backgrounds. Each trainee introduced herself at the party and was seated around a long table.

On the following day, the mentors performed on stage for the trainees. Dance mentor Lisa performed In the Name of Love and Attention; rap mentor Jony J performed My Man; vocal mentor Ella Chen performed How Old Are You; and youth producers' representative Cai Xukun performed Young. Afterward, the preliminary rating stage began.

During preliminary rating, trainees who selected the same song were paired against each other in one-on-one performances. This format was intended to make it easier to observe and compare individual trainees. Based on these performances, the mentors assigned grades ranging from Class A to F.

Episode 1 Preliminary Rating Performances
| Company | Song | Original Artist | Trainee | Class |
| TOV Entertainment | Crazy For You (为你疯狂) | Ryan.B (永斌) | Marco Lin | C |
| TOV Entertainment | Crazy For You (为你疯狂) | Ryan.B (永斌) | K Lu | B |
| TOV Entertainment | Crazy For You (为你疯狂) | Ryan.B (永斌) | Hazel Chen | C |
| Lionheart Entertainment | Crazy For You (为你疯狂) | Ryan.B (永斌) | Kelly Lin | C |
| Shanghai Star48 Culture Media Group SNH48_7SENSES | Who Is Your Girl | 7SENSES | Diamond | B |
| Shanghai Star48 Culture Media Group SNH48_7SENSES | Who Is Your Girl | 7SENSES | Kiki Xu | A |
| Shanghai Star48 Culture Media Group SNH48_7SENSES | Who Is Your Girl | 7SENSES | Eliwa Xu | C |
| Shanghai Star48 Culture Media Group SNH48_7SENSES | Who Is Your Girl | 7SENSES | Tako Zhang | C |
| Star Master Entertainment | Rose Knight (蔷薇骑士) | Hickey | Babymonster An | A |
| Star Master Entertainment | Rose Knight (蔷薇骑士) | Hickey | Verlina Mo | B |
| Star Master Entertainment | Rose Knight (蔷薇骑士) | Hickey | Frhanm Shangguan | A |
| Star Master Entertainment | Rose Knight (蔷薇骑士) | Hickey | Shirley | B |
| Independent Trainees | Perfect Day (平凡的一天) | Mao Buyi (毛不易) | Zoe Wang | C |
| Independent Trainees | Perfect Day (平凡的一天) | Mao Buyi (毛不易) | Chen Jue | B |

=== Episode 2 (14 March 2020) ===
The preliminary rating stage continued in this episode. Kong Xueer became the first trainee to be assigned to Class A. She and Zhao Xiaotang discussed their prior debut experiences and how these contributed to their maturity and independence, a topic that resonated with other trainees who had similar backgrounds.

Wang Qing and Zhang Yu performed Theme Song of Love with a comedic style that entertained both the mentors and the trainees. Wang Qing's stage presence and facial expressions impressed the mentors, earning her a place in Class A. A strong competition emerged between Shangguan Xiai, An Qi, and Xu Jiaqi, all of whom delivered notable solo performances and were placed in Class A.

Trainee Chua Zhuoyi shared her struggles with online criticism, with some claiming her background made her unqualified to join a girl group. She expressed determination to remain true to herself despite the negativity. Vocal mentor Ella Chen encouraged the trainees by emphasizing that girl groups should not be limited to a single image and that Youth With You season 2 aimed to promote diversity in female idols.

Episode 2 Preliminary Rating Performances
| Company | Song | Original Artist | Trainee | Class |
| TPG Culture | Bad Girl | Original Song | Sharon Wang | B |
| TPG Culture | Bad Girl | Original Song | JU Chen | B |
| TPG Culture | Bad Girl | Original Song | Theia Zheng | C |
| TPG Culture | Bad Girl | Original Song | Sheen Wang | C |
| Alliance Art Group | Call Me | Original Song | Shen Bing | C |
| Alliance Art Group | Call Me | Original Song | Shen Qing | C |
| Alliance Art Group | Call Me | Original Song | Shen Yu | C |
| Alliance Art Group | Call Me | Original Song | Shen Jie | C |
| Gramarie Entertainment | My New Swag (穿我的新衣) | VAVA | Jessie Fu | C |
| Gramarie Entertainment | My New Swag (穿我的新衣) | VAVA | Dolly Zhang | D |
| Gramarie Entertainment | My New Swag (穿我的新衣) | VAVA | Gia Ge | C |
| Mountain Top Entertainment | My New Swag (穿我的新衣) | VAVA | Zhao Xiaotang | C |
| Mountain Top Entertainment | My New Swag (穿我的新衣) | VAVA | Snow Kong | A |
| D·Wang Entertainment | Theme Song of Love (爱的主打歌) | Elva Hsiao (萧亚轩) | Yvonne Wang | A |
| D·Wang Entertainment | Theme Song of Love (爱的主打歌) | Elva Hsiao (萧亚轩) | Zhang Yu | B |
| OACA | Theme Song of Love (爱的主打歌) | Elva Hsiao (萧亚轩) | Liu Lingzi | B |
| OACA | Theme Song of Love (爱的主打歌) | Elva Hsiao (萧亚轩) | Jenny Zeng | B |
| OACA | Theme Song of Love (爱的主打歌) | Elva Hsiao (萧亚轩) | Aurora | B |
| OACA | Theme Song of Love (爱的主打歌) | Elva Hsiao (萧亚轩) | Seven | B |
| OACA | Theme Song of Love (爱的主打歌) | Elva Hsiao (萧亚轩) | Milla | B |
| Maninquin Entertainment | Fell in Love with You Ridiculously (莫名其妙爱上你) | Joyce Chu (四叶草) | Joy Chua | F |
| Second Culture | Fell in Love with You Ridiculously (莫名其妙爱上你) | Joyce Chu (四叶草) | NaHo | F |

=== Episode 3 (19 March 2020) ===
The preliminary rating stage continued in this episode. Duan Xiaowei impressed the mentors with a performance that incorporated Japanese sign dance and was placed in Class A. Esther Yu, described as talkative, spent several minutes explaining her acting approach, but Cai Xukun advised her to focus on specific highlights rather than overexplaining.

Later in the episode, Yu Yan delivered a strong performance that earned her placement in Class A. XIN Liu was the only trainee to choose No Joke as her performance song and competed without a rival. Her performance was praised as outstanding in all aspects, and Lisa remarked that it was the standard she had been anticipating.

Luna Qin also appeared on stage, stating that online impressions were limited and that she wanted to present a fuller image of herself through the program. A performance battle between trainees from AKB48 Team SH and SNH48 attracted attention due to their shared origins. Mentor Ella Chen commented that the performances from both groups were overly formulaic and lacked individuality, encouraging the trainees to develop distinct identities within a girl group. All of the trainees from both groups were placed in Class D.

Episode 3 Preliminary Rating Performances
| Company | Song | Original Artist | Trainee | Class |
| One Cool Jacso | Ugly Beauty (怪美的) | Jolin Tsai (蔡依林) | Jennifer Zhou | C |
| One Cool Jacso | Ugly Beauty (怪美的) | Jolin Tsai (蔡依林) | Eva Yao | F |
| Mon Young Pictures | Ugly Beauty (怪美的) | Jolin Tsai (蔡依林) | Duan Xiaowei | A |
| Mon Young Pictures | Ugly Beauty (怪美的) | Jolin Tsai (蔡依林) | Kiki Wei | B |
| Huayi Brothers | Love You (爱你) | Cyndi Wang (王心凌) | Uah | D |
| Huace Pictures | Love You (爱你) | Cyndi Wang (王心凌) | Esther Yu | D |
| JoinHall Media | Dislike (讨厌) | Rui En (芮恩) | Yu Yan | A |
| Hedgehog Brothers Entertainment | Dislike (讨厌) | Rui En (芮恩) | Hamy He | B |
| Cool Young Entertainment | Yolo | Original Song | Flora Dai | A |
| Show City Times | Shining Love (闪闪惹人爱) | Elva Hsiao (萧亚轩) | Xu Xinwen | B |
| Show City Times | Shining Love (闪闪惹人爱) | Elva Hsiao (萧亚轩) | Wei Shuyu | D |
| Show City Times | Shining Love (闪闪惹人爱) | Elva Hsiao (萧亚轩) | Han Dong | C |
| Show City Times | Shining Love (闪闪惹人爱) | Elva Hsiao (萧亚轩) | BeeBee Huang | D |
| Jaywalk Newjoy | Green Light (绿光) | Stefanie Sun (孙燕姿) | Bubble Zhu | C |
| Jaywalk Newjoy | Green Light (绿光) | Stefanie Sun (孙燕姿) | Yealy Wang | C |
| Jaywalk Newjoy | Green Light (绿光) | Stefanie Sun (孙燕姿) | Poppy Liu | D |
| Jaywalk Newjoy | Green Light (绿光) | Stefanie Sun (孙燕姿) | Tonkey | D |
| AMG Asia Music Group | No Joke | Show Lo (罗志祥) | XIN Liu | A |
| Shining Star Entertainment | Hustle | Tifa Chen (陈梓童) | Vicky Wei | B |
| Shining Star Entertainment | Hustle | Tifa Chen (陈梓童) | Jane Wang | B |
| M+ Entertainment | Ding Dong (叮咚) | Yuki Hsu (徐怀钰) | Yennis Huang | B |
| M+ Entertainment | Ding Dong (叮咚) | Yuki Hsu (徐怀钰) | Nikita Huang | F |
| M+ Entertainment | Ding Dong (叮咚) | Yuki Hsu (徐怀钰) | Yuni Xiong | D |
| Independent Trainees | Lost in Traveling (旅行中忘记) | Tia Ray (袁娅维) | Xia Yan | B |
| Independent Trainees | Lost in Traveling (旅行中忘记) | Tia Ray (袁娅维) | GoGo | B |
| Mars Digital Entertainment | Lost in Traveling (旅行中忘记) | Tia Ray (袁娅维) | Luna Qin | D |
| Mars Digital Entertainment | Lost in Traveling (旅行中忘记) | Tia Ray (袁娅维) | ET Yang | C |
| Shanghai Star48 Culture Media Group SNH48 | Painting (画) | SNH48 | Fei Qinyuan | D |
| Shanghai Star48 Culture Media Group SNH48 | Painting (画) | SNH48 | Three | D |
| Shanghai Star48 Culture Media Group SNH48 | Painting (画) | SNH48 | Air Su | D |
| Shanghai Star48 Culture Media Group SNH48 | Painting (画) | SNH48 | DDD | D |
| Shanghai Star48 Culture Media Group SNH48 | Painting (画) | SNH48 | Momo | D |
| Shanghai Star48 Culture Media Group SNH48 | Painting (画) | SNH48 | Song Xinran | D |
| Shangyue Culture AKB48 Team SH | Heavy Rotation (闪亮的幸运) | AKB48 Team SH | Anne Hu | D |
| Shangyue Culture AKB48 Team SH | Heavy Rotation (闪亮的幸运) | AKB48 Team SH | Kuliko Shen | D |

=== Episode 4 (21 March 2020) ===
The preliminary rating stage continued, beginning with performances from the rap team. Mentor Jony J commented that rappers in the program were "playing away from home," as the competition was designed primarily for idol trainees. He applied stricter standards than many participants expected, notably criticizing GIA Jin's performance.

NINEONE, who had released more than 30 original songs prior to the show, was told by Jony J that her chosen track was not competitive enough to demonstrate her abilities. Cai Xukun and Jony J disagreed on the evaluation of Shaking Chloe: while Cai felt she was strong enough for Class A, Jony argued that she needed clearer feedback to improve further. She was ultimately placed in Class B.

Later, Hana Lin attracted attention as a well-known influencer and entrepreneur. She explained that she joined the show because she considered the influencer profession unstable and wanted to expand her skills. The trainees from Yuehua Entertainment performed as a group, but mentors felt their performances lacked individuality, and all were placed in Class C.

With the preliminary rating concluded, the first mission—position assessment—was introduced. The three categories were vocal, dance, and rap. Trainees initially chose their preferred position, but only Class A trainees were allowed to select songs first. Afterward, Class A trainees also chose their teammates through a random draw. Remaining songs were distributed through a lottery system, and any unassigned trainees were placed into other groups.

Once groups were formed, leadership and center positions were assigned within each team. For the group performing Oh Boy, Sharon Wang and Shen Jie both sought the center role. The three Shen sisters (Shen Bing, Shen Qing, and Shen Yu) supported Shen Jie, arguing that she stood out more, while other group members favored Sharon. After debate, Shen Jie was chosen as the center.

Episode 4 Preliminary Rating Performances
| Company | Song | Original Artist | Trainee | Class |
| Off/Shore Music | G.I.A | Original Song | GIA Jin | C |
| WR/OC | The Color of the Wind (风的颜色) | Original Song | NINEONE | C |
| Independent Trainee | Slam Dunk (暴扣) | Original Song | Victoria Li | F |
| Yizong Cultural | Better | Original Song | Lil Reta | A |
| JNERA Cultural Media | Proud, Dignified, and Swag Shaking (堂堂正正坦坦荡荡风风火火谢可寅) | Original Song | Shaking Chloe (谢可寅) | B |
| M.Nation | It's All Yours (都是你的) | Jing'er Yu (渔静儿) | Middhi Fu | B |
| Good@ Media | It's All Yours (都是你的) | Jing'er Yu (渔静儿) | Hana Lin | F |
| Yuehua Entertainment | Secret (是秘密啊) | Cosmic Girls (宇宙少女) | Aria Jin | C |
| Yuehua Entertainment | Secret (是秘密啊) | Cosmic Girls (宇宙少女) | Vivi Chen | C |
| Yuehua Entertainment | Secret (是秘密啊) | Cosmic Girls (宇宙少女) | Kay Song | C |
| Yuehua Entertainment | Secret (是秘密啊) | Cosmic Girls (宇宙少女) | Ree Ai | C |
| Yuehua Entertainment | Secret (是秘密啊) | Cosmic Girls (宇宙少女) | Thea | C |
| Independent Trainees | Secret (是秘密啊) | Cosmic Girls (宇宙少女) | Bunny Zhang | B |
| Independent Trainees | Secret (是秘密啊) | Cosmic Girls (宇宙少女) | Ranee Way | D |
| South Fest | Secret (是秘密啊) | Cosmic Girls (宇宙少女) | Eileen | D |
| Happy Jump Culture | Secret (是秘密啊) | Cosmic Girls (宇宙少女) | Bobo Li | F |
| Encore Music | Secret (是秘密啊) | Cosmic Girls (宇宙少女) | Cheng Manxin | D |

== Missions ==
=== Mission 1: Position Evaluation ===
Color key

- Winner
- Leader
- Center
- Leader & Center

| Position | Song | Original Artist | Group Score | Name | Score | Rank Within Group | Rank Within Position | Rank Overall |
|---|---|---|---|---|---|---|---|---|
| Dance | Play | Jolin Tsai | 638 | Babymonster An | 264 | 1 | 1 | 3 |
| Dance | Play | Jolin Tsai | 638 | Gia Ge | 39 | 5 | 5 | 11 |
| Dance | Play | Jolin Tsai | 638 | Yennis Huang | 18 | 7 | 7 | 16 |
| Dance | Play | Jolin Tsai | 638 | Aria Jin | 118 | 2 | 2 | 5 |
| Dance | Play | Jolin Tsai | 638 | Snow Kong | 108 | 3 | 3 | 6 |
| Dance | Play | Jolin Tsai | 638 | Vicky Wei | 57 | 4 | 4 | 8 |
| Dance | Play | Jolin Tsai | 638 | Shirley | 34 | 6 | 6 | 13 |
| Dance | Grain in Ear (芒种) | Zhao Fangjing | 593 | Sunny Jin | 43 | 5 | 37 | 80 |
| Dance | Grain in Ear (芒种) | Zhao Fangjing | 593 | Lin Huibo | 129 | 2 | 23 | 53 |
| Dance | Grain in Ear (芒种) | Zhao Fangjing | 593 | Yeong Quan | 69 | 4 | 33 | 70 |
| Dance | Grain in Ear (芒种) | Zhao Fangjing | 593 | Song Xinran | 178 | 1 | 17 | 41 |
| Dance | Grain in Ear (芒种) | Zhao Fangjing | 593 | Air Su | 37 | 6 | 39 | 85 |
| Dance | Grain in Ear (芒种) | Zhao Fangjing | 593 | Zhang Menglu | 19 | 7 | 46 | 104 |
| Dance | Grain in Ear (芒种) | Zhao Fangjing | 593 | Tako Zhang | 118 | 3 | 26 | 57 |
| Dance | Renai Circulation (恋爱循环) | Kana Hanazawa | 588 | Vivi Chen | 117 | 2 | 27 | 58 |
| Dance | Renai Circulation (恋爱循环) | Kana Hanazawa | 588 | Hazel Chen | 22 | 7 | 44 | 100 |
| Dance | Renai Circulation (恋爱循环) | Kana Hanazawa | 588 | Duan Xiaowei | 79 | 5 | 30 | 65 |
| Dance | Renai Circulation (恋爱循环) | Kana Hanazawa | 588 | DDD | 146 | 1 | 21 | 49 |
| Dance | Renai Circulation (恋爱循环) | Kana Hanazawa | 588 | Tonkey | 25 | 6 | 42 | 96 |
| Dance | Renai Circulation (恋爱循环) | Kana Hanazawa | 588 | Zhao Xiaotang | 83 | 4 | 29 | 64 |
| Dance | Renai Circulation (恋爱循环) | Kana Hanazawa | 588 | Bubble Zhu | 116 | 3 | 28 | 59 |
| Dance | The Eve (破风) | EXO | 610 | Aurora | 8 | 7 | 49 | 109 |
| Dance | The Eve (破风) | EXO | 610 | Feng Ruohang | 25 | 6 | 42 | 96 |
| Dance | The Eve (破风) | EXO | 610 | XIN Liu | 184 | 1 | 16 | 40 |
| Dance | The Eve (破风) | EXO | 610 | K Lu | 119 | 3 | 25 | 55 |
| Dance | The Eve (破风) | EXO | 610 | Three | 56 | 5 | 36 | 75 |
| Dance | The Eve (破风) | EXO | 610 | Kiki Xu | 157 | 2 | 19 | 45 |
| Dance | The Eve (破风) | EXO | 610 | Jenny Zeng | 61 | 4 | 34 | 73 |
| Dance | Oh Boy | G.E.M. | 565 | JU Chen | 161 | 1 | 18 | 43 |
| Dance | Oh Boy | G.E.M. | 565 | Shen Bing | 21 | 5 | 45 | 101 |
| Dance | Oh Boy | G.E.M. | 565 | Shen Jie | 145 | 2 | 22 | 51 |
| Dance | Oh Boy | G.E.M. | 565 | Shen Qing | 18 | 6 | 47 | 105 |
| Dance | Oh Boy | G.E.M. | 565 | Shen Yu | 17 | 7 | 48 | 106 |
| Dance | Oh Boy | G.E.M. | 565 | Sharron Wang | 77 | 4 | 31 | 66 |
| Dance | Oh Boy | G.E.M. | 565 | Zizi Xu | 126 | 3 | 24 | 54 |
| Dance | Don't Ask (別問很可怕) | J.Sheon | 578 | Han Dong | 31 | 7 | 41 | 91 |
| Dance | Don't Ask (別問很可怕) | J.Sheon | 578 | Momo | 156 | 2 | 20 | 46 |
| Dance | Don't Ask (別問很可怕) | J.Sheon | 578 | Kay Song | 185 | 1 | 15 | 39 |
| Dance | Don't Ask (別問很可怕) | J.Sheon | 578 | Thea | 35 | 6 | 40 | 87 |
| Dance | Don't Ask (別問很可怕) | J.Sheon | 578 | Esther Yu | 70 | 3 | 32 | 69 |
| Dance | Don't Ask (別問很可怕) | J.Sheon | 578 | Dolly Zhang | 60 | 4 | 35 | 74 |
| Dance | Don't Ask (別問很可怕) | J.Sheon | 578 | Lynn Zhou | 41 | 5 | 38 | 81 |
| Dance | Bad Guy | Billie Eilish | 625 | Hana Lin | 64 | 4 | 11 | 27 |
| Dance | Bad Guy | Billie Eilish | 625 | Liu Lingzi | 231 | 1 | 8 | 21 |
| Dance | Bad Guy | Billie Eilish | 625 | Sheen Wang | 19 | 6 | 13 | 33 |
| Dance | Bad Guy | Billie Eilish | 625 | Yuni Xiong | 34 | 5 | 12 | 30 |
| Dance | Bad Guy | Billie Eilish | 625 | Pumpkin Xu | 11 | 7 | 14 | 34 |
| Dance | Bad Guy | Billie Eilish | 625 | Eliwa Xu | 160 | 2 | 9 | 23 |
| Dance | Bad Guy | Billie Eilish | 625 | Theia Zheng | 106 | 3 | 10 | 26 |
| Vocal | Kissing the Future of Love (亲亲) | Fish Leong | 626 | Meddhi Fu | 37 | 4 | 4 | 12 |
| Vocal | Kissing the Future of Love (亲亲) | Fish Leong | 626 | GoGo | 34 | 5 | 5 | 13 |
| Vocal | Kissing the Future of Love (亲亲) | Fish Leong | 626 | Verlina Mo | 27 | 6 | 6 | 15 |
| Vocal | Kissing the Future of Love (亲亲) | Fish Leong | 626 | Frhanm Shangguan | 43 | 3 | 3 | 9 |
| Vocal | Kissing the Future of Love (亲亲) | Fish Leong | 626 | Zoe Wang | 291 | 1 | 1 | 2 |
| Vocal | Kissing the Future of Love (亲亲) | Fish Leong | 626 | Xia Yan | 9 | 7 | 7 | 20 |
| Vocal | Kissing the Future of Love (亲亲) | Fish Leong | 626 | Zhang Yu | 185 | 2 | 2 | 4 |
| Vocal | Real (真实) | A-Mei (张惠妹) | 531 | Aishah | 26 | 5 | 38 | 94 |
| Vocal | Real (真实) | A-Mei (张惠妹) | 531 | Kelly Lin | 20 | 7 | 41 | 102 |
| Vocal | Real (真实) | A-Mei (张惠妹) | 531 | Ma Shujun | 134 | 2 | 20 | 52 |
| Vocal | Real (真实) | A-Mei (张惠妹) | 531 | NaHo | 65 | 3 | 27 | 72 |
| Vocal | Real (真实) | A-Mei (张惠妹) | 531 | Kiki Wei | 34 | 4 | 34 | 88 |
| Vocal | Real (真实) | A-Mei (张惠妹) | 531 | ET Yang | 226 | 1 | 16 | 37 |
| Vocal | Real (真实) | A-Mei (张惠妹) | 531 | Joy | 26 | 5 | 38 | 94 |
| Vocal | My Secret (我的秘密) | G.E.M. | 600 | Eileen | 11 | 7 | 42 | 108 |
| Vocal | My Secret (我的秘密) | G.E.M. | 600 | Joey Chua | 176 | 1 | 17 | 42 |
| Vocal | My Secret (我的秘密) | G.E.M. | 600 | Flora Dai | 150 | 2 | 19 | 48 |
| Vocal | My Secret (我的秘密) | G.E.M. | 600 | BeeBee Huang | 119 | 3 | 21 | 55 |
| Vocal | My Secret (我的秘密) | G.E.M. | 600 | Uah | 40 | 5 | 32 | 83 |
| Vocal | My Secret (我的秘密) | G.E.M. | 600 | Jane Wang | 38 | 6 | 33 | 84 |
| Vocal | My Secret (我的秘密) | G.E.M. | 600 | Roada Xu | 66 | 4 | 26 | 71 |
| Vocal | The Best of Youth (你曾是少年) | S.H.E | 515 | Ree Ai | 32 | 6 | 35 | 90 |
| Vocal | The Best of Youth (你曾是少年) | S.H.E | 515 | Cheng Manxin | 153 | 1 | 18 | 47 |
| Vocal | The Best of Youth (你曾是少年) | S.H.E | 515 | Fei Qinyuan | 93 | 2 | 23 | 62 |
| Vocal | The Best of Youth (你曾是少年) | S.H.E | 515 | Jessie Fu | 74 | 4 | 25 | 68 |
| Vocal | The Best of Youth (你曾是少年) | S.H.E | 515 | Anne Hu | 91 | 3 | 24 | 63 |
| Vocal | The Best of Youth (你曾是少年) | S.H.E | 515 | Poppy Liu | 28 | 7 | 36 | 92 |
| Vocal | The Best of Youth (你曾是少年) | S.H.E | 515 | Su Qinrou | 44 | 5 | 30 | 79 |
| Vocal | Sun (太阳) | PikA Qiu | 543 | Kuliko Shen | 46 | 4 | 29 | 78 |
| Vocal | Sun (太阳) | PikA Qiu | 543 | Ranee Wang | 51 | 3 | 28 | 76 |
| Vocal | Sun (太阳) | PikA Qiu | 543 | Xu Xinwen | 239 | 1 | 15 | 36 |
| Vocal | Sun (太阳) | PikA Qiu | 543 | Eva Yao | 23 | 7 | 40 | 98 |
| Vocal | Sun (太阳) | PikA Qiu | 543 | Zha Yichen | 28 | 6 | 36 | 92 |
| Vocal | Sun (太阳) | PikA Qiu | 543 | Jacqueline Zhang | 115 | 2 | 22 | 60 |
| Vocal | Sun (太阳) | PikA Qiu | 543 | Seven | 41 | 5 | 31 | 81 |
| Vocal | Flammable and Explosive (易燃易爆炸) | Chen Li | 602 | Chen Jue | 48 | 4 | 11 | 28 |
| Vocal | Flammable and Explosive (易燃易爆炸) | Chen Li | 602 | Diamond | 119 | 3 | 10 | 25 |
| Vocal | Flammable and Explosive (易燃易爆炸) | Chen Li | 602 | Yvonne Wang | 24 | 7 | 14 | 32 |
| Vocal | Flammable and Explosive (易燃易爆炸) | Chen Li | 602 | Rio Wang | 35 | 5 | 12 | 29 |
| Vocal | Flammable and Explosive (易燃易爆炸) | Chen Li | 602 | Yealy Wang | 33 | 6 | 13 | 31 |
| Vocal | Flammable and Explosive (易燃易爆炸) | Chen Li | 602 | Yu Yan | 220 | 1 | 8 | 22 |
| Vocal | Flammable and Explosive (易燃易爆炸) | Chen Li | 602 | Juicy Zuo | 123 | 2 | 9 | 24 |
| Rap | The Minds of Billy Milligan (24个比利) | Wilber Pan | 559 | Lil Reta | 20 | 6 | 17 | 102 |
| Rap | The Minds of Billy Milligan (24个比利) | Wilber Pan | 559 | Hamy He | 77 | 3 | 12 | 66 |
| Rap | The Minds of Billy Milligan (24个比利) | Wilber Pan | 559 | GIA Jin | 51 | 4 | 13 | 76 |
| Rap | The Minds of Billy Milligan (24个比利) | Wilber Pan | 559 | Marco Lin | 260 | 1 | 7 | 35 |
| Rap | The Minds of Billy Milligan (24个比利) | Wilber Pan | 559 | Sophia Wang | 36 | 5 | 14 | 86 |
| Rap | The Minds of Billy Milligan (24个比利) | Wilber Pan | 559 | Jennifer Zhou | 115 | 2 | 11 | 60 |
| Rap | Single Eyelid Girl (单眼皮女生) | China Dolls | 568 | Du Ziyi | 18 | 4 | 4 | 16 |
| Rap | Single Eyelid Girl (单眼皮女生) | China Dolls | 568 | Milla | 15 | 6 | 6 | 19 |
| Rap | Single Eyelid Girl (单眼皮女生) | China Dolls | 568 | Monster Sun | 42 | 3 | 3 | 10 |
| Rap | Single Eyelid Girl (单眼皮女生) | China Dolls | 568 | Wang Yaoyao | 17 | 5 | 5 | 18 |
| Rap | Single Eyelid Girl (单眼皮女生) | China Dolls | 568 | Shaking | 401 | 1 | 1 | 1 |
| Rap | Single Eyelid Girl (单眼皮女生) | China Dolls | 568 | Bunny Zhang | 75 | 2 | 2 | 7 |
| Rap | Melody | David Tao | 565 | Nikita Huang | 34 | 4 | 15 | 88 |
| Rap | Melody | David Tao | 565 | Bobo Li | 23 | 5 | 16 | 98 |
| Rap | Melody | David Tao | 565 | Victoria li | 159 | 2 | 9 | 44 |
| Rap | Melody | David Tao | 565 | NINEONE | 189 | 1 | 8 | 38 |
| Rap | Melody | David Tao | 565 | Luna Qin | 146 | 3 | 10 | 49 |
| Rap | Melody | David Tao | 565 | Wei Shuyu | 14 | 6 | 18 | 107 |

Ranking of Position Evaluation (Only Dance)
| Name | Ranking | Number of Votes |
| Babymonster An | 1 | 20264 |
| Aria Jin | 2 | 10118 |
| Snow Kong | 3 | 10108 |
| Vicky Wei | 4 | 10057 |
| Gia Ge | 5 | 10039 |
| Shirley | 6 | 10034 |
| Yennis Huang | 7 | 10018 |
| Liu Lingzi | 8 | 3231 |
| Eliwa Xu | 9 | 3160 |
| Theia Zheng | 10 | 3106 |
| Hana Lin | 11 | 3064 |
| Yuni Xiong | 12 | 3034 |
| Sheen Wang | 13 | 3019 |
| Pumpkin Xu | 14 | 3011 |
| Kay Song | 15 | 185 |
| XIN Liu | 16 | 184 |
| Song Xinran | 17 | 178 |
| JU Chen | 18 | 161 |
| Kiki Xu | 19 | 157 |
| Momo | 20 | 156 |
| DDD | 21 | 146 |
| Shen Jie | 22 | 145 |
| Lin Huibo | 23 | 129 |
| Zizi Xu | 24 | 126 |
| K Lu | 25 | 119 |
| Tako Zhang | 26 | 118 |
| Vivi Chen | 27 | 117 |
| Bubble Xu | 28 | 116 |
| Zhao Xiaotang | 29 | 83 |
| Duan Xiaowei | 30 | 79 |
| Sharon Wang | 31 | 77 |
| Esther Yu | 32 | 70 |
| Yeong Quan | 33 | 69 |
| Jenny Zeng | 34 | 61 |
| Dolly Zhang | 35 | 60 |
| Three | 36 | 56 |
| Sunny Jin | 37 | 43 |
| Lynn ZHou | 38 | 41 |
| Air SU | 39 | 37 |
| Thea | 40 | 35 |
| Han Dong | 41 | 31 |
| Feng Ruohang | 42 | 25 |
| Tonkey | 42 | 25 |
| Hazel Chen | 44 | 22 |
| Shen Bing | 45 | 21 |
| Zhang Menglu | 46 | 19 |
| Shen Qing | 47 | 18 |
| Shen Yu | 48 | 17 |
| Aurora | 49 | 8 |

Ranking of Position Evaluation (Only Vocal)
| Name | Ranking | Number of Votes |
| Zoe Wang | 1 | 20291 |
| Zhang Yu | 2 | 10185 |
| Frhanm Shangguan | 3 | 10043 |
| Meddhi Fu | 4 | 10037 |
| GoGo | 5 | 10034 |
| Verlina Mo | 6 | 10027 |
| Xia Yan | 7 | 10009 |
| Yu Yan | 8 | 3220 |
| Juicy Zuo | 9 | 3123 |
| Diamond | 10 | 3119 |
| Chen Jue | 11 | 3048 |
| Rio Wang | 12 | 3035 |
| Yealy Wang | 13 | 3033 |
| Yvonne Wang | 14 | 3024 |
| Xu Xinwen | 15 | 239 |
| ET Yang | 16 | 226 |
| Joey Chua | 17 | 176 |
| Cheng Manxin | 18 | 153 |
| Flora Dai | 19 | 150 |
| Ma Shujun | 20 | 134 |
| BeeBee Huang | 21 | 119 |
| Jacqueline Zhang | 22 | 115 |
| Fei Qinyuan | 23 | 93 |
| Anne Hu | 24 | 91 |
| Jessie Fu | 25 | 74 |
| Roada Xu | 26 | 66 |
| NaHo | 27 | 65 |
| Ranee Wang | 28 | 51 |
| Kuliko Shen | 29 | 46 |
| Su Qinrou | 30 | 44 |
| Seven | 31 | 41 |
| Uah | 32 | 40 |
| Jane Wang | 33 | 38 |
| Kiki Wei | 34 | 34 |
| Ree Ai | 35 | 32 |
| Poppy Liu | 36 | 28 |
| Zha Yichen | 36 | 28 |
| Aishah | 38 | 26 |
| Joy | 38 | 26 |
| Eva Yao | 40 | 23 |
| Kelly Li | 41 | 20 |
| Eileen | 42 | 11 |

Ranking of Position Evaluation (Only Rap)
| Name | Ranking | Number of Votes |
| Shaking | 1 | 20401 |
| Bunny Zhang | 2 | 10075 |
| Monster Sun | 3 | 10042 |
| Du Ziyi | 4 | 10018 |
| Wang Yaoyao | 5 | 10017 |
| Milla | 6 | 10015 |
| Marco Lin | 7 | 260 |
| NINEONE | 8 | 189 |
| Victoria Li | 9 | 159 |
| Luna Qin | 10 | 146 |
| Jennifer Zhou | 11 | 115 |
| Hamy He | 12 | 77 |
| GIA Jin | 13 | 51 |
| Sophia Wang | 14 | 36 |
| Nikita Huang | 15 | 34 |
| Bobo Li | 16 | 23 |
| Lil Reta | 17 | 20 |
| Wei Shuyu | 18 | 14 |

=== Mission 2: Group Battle ===
Color key

- Winner
- Leader
- Center
- Leader & Center

| Song | Original Artist | Group | Name | Position | Number of Personal Votes | Number of Group Votes | Revenge | | |
| Song | Original Artist | Group | Name | Position | Number of Personal Votes | Number of Group Votes | Group | Name | Mentor Votes |
|---|---|---|---|---|---|---|---|---|---|
| MAMA - Chinese Version | EXO | A | Aria Jin | Deputy Lead Singer | 91 | 334 | A | DDD | 4 |
| MAMA - Chinese Version | EXO | A | K Lu | Main Dance, Deputy Lead Singer | 52 | 334 | A | Feng Ruohang | 4 |
| MAMA - Chinese Version | EXO | A | Vicky Wei | Rap | 55 | 334 | A | Liu Lingzi | 4 |
| MAMA - Chinese Version | EXO | A | Shaking | Rap | 96 | 334 | A | NaHo | 4 |
| MAMA - Chinese Version | EXO | A | Xu Xinwen | Lead Singer | 40 | 334 | A | Kiki Xu | 4 |
| MAMA - Chinese Version | EXO | B | Diamond | Rap | 126 | 317 | B | Gia Ge | 0 |
| MAMA - Chinese Version | EXO | B | Ma Shujun | Main Dance, Deputy Lead Singer | 27 | 317 | B | Marco Lin | 0 |
| MAMA - Chinese Version | EXO | B | Xia Yan | Rap | 33 | 317 | B | Frhanm Shangguan | 0 |
| MAMA - Chinese Version | EXO | B | Tako Zhang | Deputy Lead Singer | 64 | 317 | B | Three | 0 |
| MAMA - Chinese Version | EXO | B | Juicy Zuo | Lead Singer | 67 | 317 | B | Bubble Zhu | 0 |
| R&B All Night | KnowKnow, Higher Brothers | A | Liu Lingzi | Deputy Lead Singer | 82 | 453 | A | Joey Chua | 4 |
| R&B All Night | KnowKnow, Higher Brothers | A | Yvonne Wang | Lead Singer | 36 | 453 | A | Aria Jin | 4 |
| R&B All Night | KnowKnow, Higher Brothers | A | Kiki Xu | Rap | 269 | 453 | A | Hana Lin | 4 |
| R&B All Night | KnowKnow, Higher Brothers | A | Eliwa Xu | Deputy Lead Singer | 28 | 453 | A | Momo | 4 |
| R&B All Night | KnowKnow, Higher Brothers | A | Bunny Zhang | Rap | 38 | 453 | A | Yu Yan | 4 |
| R&B All Night | KnowKnow, Higher Brothers | B | Flora Dai | Lead Singer | 70 | 214 | B | Diamond | 0 |
| R&B All Night | KnowKnow, Higher Brothers | B | Gia Ge | Rap | 23 | 214 | B | Fei Qinyuan | 0 |
| R&B All Night | KnowKnow, Higher Brothers | B | Song Xinran | Deputy Lead Singer | 55 | 214 | B | Air Su | 0 |
| R&B All Night | KnowKnow, Higher Brothers | B | Sharon Wang | Rap | 45 | 214 | B | Xia Yan | 0 |
| R&B All Night | KnowKnow, Higher Brothers | B | Ranee Wang | Deputy Lead Singer | 21 | 214 | B | Tako Zhang | 0 |
| How Can I Look So Good (我怎么这么好看) | Wowkie Zhang | A | JU Chen | Main Dance, Rap | 11 | 333 | A | Kay Song | 3 |
| How Can I Look So Good (我怎么这么好看) | Wowkie Zhang | A | Feng Ruohang | Lead Singer | 29 | 333 | A | Monster Sun | 3 |
| How Can I Look So Good (我怎么这么好看) | Wowkie Zhang | A | Snow Kong | Rap | 85 | 333 | A | Yvonne Wang | 3 |
| How Can I Look So Good (我怎么这么好看) | Wowkie Zhang | A | Hana Lin | Lead Singer | 23 | 333 | A | Eliwa Xu | 3 |
| How Can I Look So Good (我怎么这么好看) | Wowkie Zhang | A | Esther Yu | Lead Singer | 185 | 333 | A | Jenny Zeng | 3 |
| How Can I Look So Good (我怎么这么好看) | Wowkie Zhang | B | Vivi Chen | Lead Singer | 30 | 281 | B | Han Dong | 1 |
| How Can I Look So Good (我怎么这么好看) | Wowkie Zhang | B | GoGo | Lead Singer | 39 | 281 | B | Sharon Wang | 1 |
| How Can I Look So Good (我怎么这么好看) | Wowkie Zhang | B | Yennis Huang | Main Dance, Lead Singer | 22 | 281 | B | Ranee Wang | 1 |
| How Can I Look So Good (我怎么这么好看) | Wowkie Zhang | B | NINEONE | Rap | 122 | 281 | B | Zoe Wang | 1 |
| How Can I Look So Good (我怎么这么好看) | Wowkie Zhang | B | Frhanm Shangguan | Rap | 68 | 281 | B | Zizi Xu | 1 |
| A Little Sweet (有点甜) | Silence Wang | A | Babymonster An | Main Dance, Lead Singer | 195 | 339 | A | JU Chen | 4 |
| A Little Sweet (有点甜) | Silence Wang | A | Jessie Fu | Lead Singer, Rap | 37 | 339 | A | Duan Xiaowei | 4 |
| A Little Sweet (有点甜) | Silence Wang | A | Sunny Jin | Deputy Lead Singer | 25 | 339 | A | Vicky Wei | 4 |
| A Little Sweet (有点甜) | Silence Wang | A | Victoria Li | Rap, Deputy Lead Singer | 30 | 339 | A | Xu Xinwen | 4 |
| A Little Sweet (有点甜) | Silence Wang | A | Momo | Deputy Lead Singer | 52 | 339 | A | Bunny Zhang | 4 |
| A Little Sweet (有点甜) | Silence Wang | B | Fei Qinyuan | Lead Singer | 83 | 254 | B | Chen Jue | 0 |
| A Little Sweet (有点甜) | Silence Wang | B | Meddhi Fu | Lead Singer | 42 | 254 | B | Vivi Chen | 0 |
| A Little Sweet (有点甜) | Silence Wang | B | Marco Lin | Rap, Deputy Lead Singer | 34 | 254 | B | GoGo | 0 |
| A Little Sweet (有点甜) | Silence Wang | B | Luna Qin | Rap, Deputy Lead Singer | 36 | 254 | B | Anne Hu | 0 |
| A Little Sweet (有点甜) | Silence Wang | B | Bubble Zhu | Main Dance, Deputy Lead Singer | 59 | 254 | B | Song Xinran | 0 |
| Ambush On All Sides II (十面埋伏2) | Ivy, Dany Lee | A | Chen Jue | Main Dance, Rap | 29 | 249 | A | Babymonster An | 4 |
| Ambush On All Sides II (十面埋伏2) | Ivy, Dany Lee | A | Han Dong | Lead Singer | 25 | 249 | A | Jessie Fu | 4 |
| Ambush On All Sides II (十面埋伏2) | Ivy, Dany Lee | A | Three | Rap | 91 | 249 | A | Snow Kong | 4 |
| Ambush On All Sides II (十面埋伏2) | Ivy, Dany Lee | A | Zhang Yu | Rap | 28 | 249 | A | Victoria Li | 4 |
| Ambush On All Sides II (十面埋伏2) | Ivy, Dany Lee | A | Zhao Xiaotang | Deputy Lead Singer | 76 | 249 | A | XIN Liu | 4 |
| Ambush On All Sides II (十面埋伏2) | Ivy, Dany Lee | B | Joey Chu | Deputy Lead Singer | 30 | 371 | B | Flora Dai | 0 |
| Ambush On All Sides II (十面埋伏2) | Ivy, Dany Lee | B | Kay Song | Rap | 27 | 371 | B | Yennis Huang | 0 |
| Ambush On All Sides II (十面埋伏2) | Ivy, Dany Lee | B | Roada Xu | Lead Singer | 40 | 371 | B | Ma Shujun | 0 |
| Ambush On All Sides II (十面埋伏2) | Ivy, Dany Lee | B | Yu Yan | Rap | 193 | 371 | B | Zhang Menglu | 0 |
| Ambush On All Sides II (十面埋伏2) | Ivy, Dany Lee | B | Jenny Zeng | Main Dance, Rap | 81 | 371 | B | Juicy Zuo | 0 |
| Missing You 3000 (想見你想見你想見你) | 831 | A | Duan Xiaowei | Rap | 25 | 475 | A | Sunny Jin | 1 |
| Missing You 3000 (想見你想見你想見你) | 831 | A | DDD | Lead Singer | 44 | 475 | A | K Lu | 1 |
| Missing You 3000 (想見你想見你想見你) | 831 | A | XIN Liu | Main Dance, Rap | 291 | 475 | A | Shaking | 1 |
| Missing You 3000 (想見你想見你想見你) | 831 | A | NaHo | Deputy Lead Singer | 96 | 475 | A | Roada Xu | 1 |
| Missing You 3000 (想見你想見你想見你) | 831 | A | Monster Sun | Deputy Lead Singer | 19 | 475 | A | Esther Yu | 1 |
| Missing You 3000 (想見你想見你想見你) | 831 | B | Anne Hu | Rap | 46 | 157 | B | Meddhi Fu | 3 |
| Missing You 3000 (想見你想見你想見你) | 831 | B | Air Su | Deputy Lead Singer | 40 | 157 | B | NINEONE | 3 |
| Missing You 3000 (想見你想見你想見你) | 831 | B | Zoe Wang | Lead Singer | 25 | 157 | B | Luna Qin | 3 |
| Missing You 3000 (想見你想見你想見你) | 831 | B | Zizi Xu | Deputy Lead Singer | 25 | 157 | B | Zhang Yu | 3 |
| Missing You 3000 (想見你想見你想見你) | 831 | B | Zhang Menglu | Main Dance, Deputy Lead Singer | 21 | 157 | B | Zhao Xiaotang | 3 |

Ranking of Group Battle
| Name | Ranking | Number of Votes |
| XIN Liu | 1 | 80291 |
| NaHo | 2 | 80096 |
| DDD | 3 | 80044 |
| Duan Xiaowei | 4 | 80025 |
| Monster Sun | 5 | 80019 |
| Kiki Xu | 6 | 30269 |
| Babymonster An | 7 | 30195 |
| Yu Yan | 8 | 30193 |
| Esther Yu | 9 | 30185 |
| Shaking | 10 | 30096 |
| Aria Jin | 11 | 30091 |
| Snow Kong | 12 | 30085 |
| Liu Lingzi | 13 | 30082 |
| Jenny Zeng | 14 | 30081 |
| Vicky Wei | 15 | 30055 |
| K Lu | 16 | 30052 |
| Momo | 16 | 30052 |
| Xu Xinwen | 18 | 30040 |
| Roada Xu | 18 | 30040 |
| Bunny Zhang | 20 | 30038 |
| Jessie Fu | 21 | 30037 |
| Yvonne Wang | 22 | 30036 |
| Joey Chua | 23 | 30030 |
| Victoria Li | 23 | 30030 |
| Feng Ruohang | 25 | 30029 |
| Eliwa Xu | 26 | 30028 |
| Kay Song | 27 | 30027 |
| Sunny Jin | 28 | 30025 |
| Hana Lin | 29 | 30023 |
| JU Chen | 30 | 30011 |
| Diamond | 31 | 126 |
| NINEONE | 32 | 122 |
| Three | 33 | 91 |
| Fei Qinyuan | 34 | 83 |
| Zhao Xiaotang | 35 | 76 |
| Flora Dai | 36 | 70 |
| Frhanm Shangguan | 37 | 68 |
| Juicy Zuo | 38 | 67 |
| Tako Zhang | 39 | 64 |
| Bubble Xu | 40 | 59 |
| Song Xinran | 41 | 55 |
| Anne Hu | 42 | 46 |
| SharonWang | 43 | 45 |
| Meddhi Fu | 44 | 42 |
| Air Su | 45 | 40 |
| GoGo | 46 | 39 |
| Luna Qin | 47 | 36 |
| Marco Lin | 48 | 34 |
| Xia Yan | 49 | 33 |
| Vivi Chen | 50 | 30 |
| Chen Jue | 51 | 29 |
| Zhang Yu | 52 | 28 |
| Ma Shujun | 53 | 27 |
| Han Dong | 54 | 25 |
| Zoe Wang | 54 | 25 |
| Zizi Xu | 54 | 25 |
| Gia Ge | 57 | 23 |
| Yennis Huang | 58 | 22 |
| Ranee Wang | 59 | 21 |
| Zhang Menglu | 59 | 21 |

=== Mission 3: Theme Song Assessment ===
Color key

- Winner
- Leader
- Center
- Leader & Center

| Song | Genre | Style | Before Elimination | | After Elimination | | Number of Personal Votes | Number of Group Votes |
| Song | Genre | Style | Group | Name | Group Name | Name | Number of Personal Votes | Number of Group Votes |
|---|---|---|---|---|---|---|---|---|
| No Company (不奉陪) | Synth Pop | Personality Attitude | A | Fei Qinyuan | No Time For You | Gia Ge | 5 | 103 |
| No Company (不奉陪) | Synth Pop | Personality Attitude | A | Gia Ge | No Time For You | Gia Ge | 5 | 103 |
| No Company (不奉陪) | Synth Pop | Personality Attitude | A | Liu Lingzi | No Time For You | Liu Lingzi | 13 | 103 |
| No Company (不奉陪) | Synth Pop | Personality Attitude | A | Momo | No Time For You | Liu Lingzi | 13 | 103 |
| No Company (不奉陪) | Synth Pop | Personality Attitude | A | Eliwa Xu | No Time For You | K Lu | 32 | 103 |
| No Company (不奉陪) | Synth Pop | Personality Attitude | A | Zhang Menglu | No Time For You | K Lu | 32 | 103 |
| No Company (不奉陪) | Synth Pop | Personality Attitude | A | Tako Zhang | No Time For You | NINEONE | 19 | 103 |
| No Company (不奉陪) | Synth Pop | Personality Attitude | B | Duan Xiaowei | No Time For You | NINEONE | 19 | 103 |
| No Company (不奉陪) | Synth Pop | Personality Attitude | B | Sunny Jin | No Time For You | Eliwa Xu | 7 | 103 |
| No Company (不奉陪) | Synth Pop | Personality Attitude | B | K Lu | No Time For You | Eliwa Xu | 7 | 103 |
| No Company (不奉陪) | Synth Pop | Personality Attitude | B | Momo | No Time For You | Jenny Zeng | 14 | 103 |
| No Company (不奉陪) | Synth Pop | Personality Attitude | B | NINEONE | No Time For You | Jenny Zeng | 14 | 103 |
| No Company (不奉陪) | Synth Pop | Personality Attitude | B | Jenny Zeng | No Time For You | Tako Zhang | 13 | 103 |
| No Company (不奉陪) | Synth Pop | Personality Attitude | B | Tako Zhang | No Time For You | Tako Zhang | 13 | 103 |
| Non Daily Revelry (非日常狂欢) | EDM | Carnival Dynamic | A | Feng Ruohang | Bunches Honey Ha! | Aria Jin | 21 | 198 |
| Non Daily Revelry (非日常狂欢) | EDM | Carnival Dynamic | A | Aria Jin | Bunches Honey Ha! | Aria Jin | 21 | 198 |
| Non Daily Revelry (非日常狂欢) | EDM | Carnival Dynamic | A | Snow Kong | Bunches Honey Ha! | Snow Kong | 30 | 198 |
| Non Daily Revelry (非日常狂欢) | EDM | Carnival Dynamic | A | Song Xinran | Bunches Honey Ha! | Snow Kong | 30 | 198 |
| Non Daily Revelry (非日常狂欢) | EDM | Carnival Dynamic | A | Shaking | Bunches Honey Ha! | Three | 8 | 198 |
| Non Daily Revelry (非日常狂欢) | EDM | Carnival Dynamic | A | Kiki Xu | Bunches Honey Ha! | Three | 8 | 198 |
| Non Daily Revelry (非日常狂欢) | EDM | Carnival Dynamic | A | Zizi Xu | Bunches Honey Ha! | Shaking | 22 | 198 |
| Non Daily Revelry (非日常狂欢) | EDM | Carnival Dynamic | B | Yennis Huang | Bunches Honey Ha! | Shaking | 22 | 198 |
| Non Daily Revelry (非日常狂欢) | EDM | Carnival Dynamic | B | Snow Kong | Bunches Honey Ha! | Kiki Xu | 43 | 198 |
| Non Daily Revelry (非日常狂欢) | EDM | Carnival Dynamic | B | Monster Sun | Bunches Honey Ha! | Kiki Xu | 43 | 198 |
| Non Daily Revelry (非日常狂欢) | EDM | Carnival Dynamic | B | Three | Bunches Honey Ha! | Esther Yu | 58 | 198 |
| Non Daily Revelry (非日常狂欢) | EDM | Carnival Dynamic | B | Kiki Xu | Bunches Honey Ha! | Esther Yu | 58 | 198 |
| Non Daily Revelry (非日常狂欢) | EDM | Carnival Dynamic | B | Esther Yu | Bunches Honey Ha! | Zhao Xiaotang | 16 | 198 |
| Non Daily Revelry (非日常狂欢) | EDM | Carnival Dynamic | B | Zhao Xiaotang | Bunches Honey Ha! | Zhao Xiaotang | 16 | 198 |
| Lion | Pop | Crazy Brave | A | Babymonster An | Purple Lion | Babymonster An | 26 | 331 |
| Lion | Pop | Crazy Brave | A | Diamond | Purple Lion | Babymonster An | 26 | 331 |
| Lion | Pop | Crazy Brave | A | XIN Liu | Purple Lion | Chen Jue | 6 | 331 |
| Lion | Pop | Crazy Brave | A | Ma Shujun | Purple Lion | Chen Jue | 6 | 331 |
| Lion | Pop | Crazy Brave | A | Frhanm Shangguan | Purple Lion | Diamond | 11 | 331 |
| Lion | Pop | Crazy Brave | A | Kay Song | Purple Lion | Diamond | 11 | 331 |
| Lion | Pop | Crazy Brave | A | Air Su | Purple Lion | XIN Liu | 183 | 331 |
| Lion | Pop | Crazy Brave | B | Chen Jue | Purple Lion | XIN Liu | 183 | 331 |
| Lion | Pop | Crazy Brave | B | Diamond | Purple Lion | Frhanm Shangguan | 12 | 331 |
| Lion | Pop | Crazy Brave | B | Marco Lin | Purple Lion | Frhanm Shangguan | 12 | 331 |
| Lion | Pop | Crazy Brave | B | Su Shanshan | Purple Lion | Sharon Wang | 10 | 331 |
| Lion | Pop | Crazy Brave | B | Sharon Wang | Purple Lion | Sharon Wang | 10 | 331 |
| Lion | Pop | Crazy Brave | B | Vicky Wei | Purple Lion | Yu Yan | 83 | 331 |
| Lion | Pop | Crazy Brave | B | Yu Yan | Purple Lion | Yu Yan | 83 | 331 |
| Light Orange Island (浅橘色孤岛) | R&B | Lazy Delicate | A | DDD | Light Orange Is~ land | Flora Dai | 9 | 70 |
| Light Orange Island (浅橘色孤岛) | R&B | Lazy Delicate | A | GoGo | Light Orange Is~ land | Flora Dai | 9 | 70 |
| Light Orange Island (浅橘色孤岛) | R&B | Lazy Delicate | A | Victoria Li | Light Orange Is~ land | DDD | 9 | 70 |
| Light Orange Island (浅橘色孤岛) | R&B | Lazy Delicate | A | Yvonne Wang | Light Orange Is~ land | DDD | 9 | 70 |
| Light Orange Island (浅橘色孤岛) | R&B | Lazy Delicate | A | Xia Yan | Light Orange Is~ land | Song Xinran | 12 | 70 |
| Light Orange Island (浅橘色孤岛) | R&B | Lazy Delicate | A | Zhang Yu | Light Orange Is~ land | Song Xinran | 12 | 70 |
| Light Orange Island (浅橘色孤岛) | R&B | Lazy Delicate | A | Juicy Zuo | Light Orange Is~ land | Xu Xinwen | 11 | 70 |
| Light Orange Island (浅橘色孤岛) | R&B | Lazy Delicate | B | Flora Dai | Light Orange Is~ land | Xu Xinwen | 11 | 70 |
| Light Orange Island (浅橘色孤岛) | R&B | Lazy Delicate | B | Jessie Fu | Light Orange Is~ land | Roada Xu | 11 | 70 |
| Light Orange Island (浅橘色孤岛) | R&B | Lazy Delicate | B | Victoria Li | Light Orange Is~ land | Roada Xu | 11 | 70 |
| Light Orange Island (浅橘色孤岛) | R&B | Lazy Delicate | B | Yvonne Wang | Light Orange Is~ land | Zhang Yu | 12 | 70 |
| Light Orange Island (浅橘色孤岛) | R&B | Lazy Delicate | B | Ranee Wang | Light Orange Is~ land | Zhang Yu | 12 | 70 |
| Light Orange Island (浅橘色孤岛) | R&B | Lazy Delicate | B | Xu Xinwen | Light Orange Is~ land | Juicy Zuo | 6 | 70 |
| Light Orange Island (浅橘色孤岛) | R&B | Lazy Delicate | B | Roada Xu | Light Orange Is~ land | Juicy Zuo | 6 | 70 |
| Knock Knock (敲敲) | Ballad | Girl Fresh | A | JU Chen | Knock Knock 7 Plus 7 | Joey Chua | 3 | 48 |
| Knock Knock (敲敲) | Ballad | Girl Fresh | A | Joey Chua | Knock Knock 7 Plus 7 | Joey Chua | 3 | 48 |
| Knock Knock (敲敲) | Ballad | Girl Fresh | A | Fu Ruqiao | Knock Knock 7 Plus 7 | Meddhi Fu | 5 | 48 |
| Knock Knock (敲敲) | Ballad | Girl Fresh | A | Han Dong | Knock Knock 7 Plus 7 | Meddhi Fu | 5 | 48 |
| Knock Knock (敲敲) | Ballad | Girl Fresh | A | Hana Lin | Knock Knock 7 Plus 7 | Marco Lin | 13 | 48 |
| Knock Knock (敲敲) | Ballad | Girl Fresh | A | NaHo | Knock Knock 7 Plus 7 | Marco Lin | 13 | 48 |
| Knock Knock (敲敲) | Ballad | Girl Fresh | A | Bubble Xu | Knock Knock 7 Plus 7 | Hana Lin | 6 | 48 |
| Knock Knock (敲敲) | Ballad | Girl Fresh | B | JU Chen | Knock Knock 7 Plus 7 | Hana Lin | 6 | 48 |
| Knock Knock (敲敲) | Ballad | Girl Fresh | B | Chen Xinwei | Knock Knock 7 Plus 7 | Momo | 6 | 48 |
| Knock Knock (敲敲) | Ballad | Girl Fresh | B | Meddhi Fu | Knock Knock 7 Plus 7 | Momo | 6 | 48 |
| Knock Knock (敲敲) | Ballad | Girl Fresh | B | Anne Hu | Knock Knock 7 Plus 7 | Bunny Zhang | 9 | 48 |
| Knock Knock (敲敲) | Ballad | Girl Fresh | B | Luna Qin | Knock Knock 7 Plus 7 | Bunny Zhang | 9 | 48 |
| Knock Knock (敲敲) | Ballad | Girl Fresh | B | Zoe Wang | Knock Knock 7 Plus 7 | Bubble Zhu | 6 | 48 |
| Knock Knock (敲敲) | Ballad | Girl Fresh | B | Bubble Zhu | Knock Knock 7 Plus 7 | Bubble Zhu | 6 | 48 |

Ranking of Theme Song Assessment
| Name | Ranking | Number of Votes |
| XIN Liu | 1 | 200183 |
| Yu Yan | 2 | 50083 |
| Babymonster An | 3 | 50026 |
| Frhanm Shangguan | 4 | 50012 |
| Diamond | 5 | 50011 |
| Sharon Wang | 6 | 50010 |
| Chen Jue | 7 | 50006 |
| Esther Yu | 8 | 58 |
| Kiki Xu | 9 | 43 |
| K Lu | 10 | 32 |
| Snow Kong | 11 | 30 |
| Shaking | 12 | 22 |
| Aria Jin | 13 | 21 |
| NINEONE | 14 | 19 |
| Zhao Xiaotang | 15 | 16 |
| Jenny Zeng | 16 | 14 |
| Marco Lin | 17 | 13 |
| Liu Lingzi | 17 | 13 |
| Tako Zhang | 17 | 13 |
| Song Xinran | 20 | 12 |
| Zhang Yu | 20 | 12 |
| Xu Xinwen | 22 | 11 |
| Roada Xu | 22 | 11 |
| Flora Dai | 24 | 9 |
| Duan Yixuan | 24 | 9 |
| Bunny Zhang | 24 | 9 |
| Three | 27 | 8 |
| Eliwa Xu | 28 | 7 |
| Hana Lin | 29 | 6 |
| Momo | 29 | 6 |
| Bubble Xu | 29 | 6 |
| Juicy Zuo | 29 | 6 |
| Meddhi Fu | 33 | 5 |
| Gia Ge | 33 | 5 |
| Joey Chua | 35 | 3 |

=== Mission 4: Cooperation Stage ===
Color key

- Leader
- Center
- Leader & Center

| Song | Original Artist | Mentors | Trainees |
|---|---|---|---|
| Lover (情人) | Cai Xukun | Cai Xukun | Babymonster An |
| Lover (情人) | Cai Xukun | Cai Xukun | Gia Ge |
| Lover (情人) | Cai Xukun | Cai Xukun | Liu Lingzi |
| Lover (情人) | Cai Xukun | Cai Xukun | Kiki Xu |
| Lover (情人) | Cai Xukun | Cai Xukun | Xu Xinwen |
| Lover (情人) | Cai Xukun | Cai Xukun | Eliwa Xu |
| I'm Not Yours | Jolin Tsai, Namie Amuro | Lisa | Aria Jin |
| I'm Not Yours | Jolin Tsai, Namie Amuro | Lisa | Snow Kong |
| I'm Not Yours | Jolin Tsai, Namie Amuro | Lisa | XIN Liu |
| I'm Not Yours | Jolin Tsai, Namie Amuro | Lisa | K Lu |
| I'm Not Yours | Jolin Tsai, Namie Amuro | Lisa | Esther Yu |
| I'm Not Yours | Jolin Tsai, Namie Amuro | Lisa | Jenny Zeng |
| Goodnight Song + YES! OK! (晚安歌+YES!OK!) | Ella Chen | Ella Chen | Chen Jue |
| Goodnight Song + YES! OK! (晚安歌+YES!OK!) | Ella Chen | Ella Chen | Joey Chua |
| Goodnight Song + YES! OK! (晚安歌+YES!OK!) | Ella Chen | Ella Chen | Meddhi Fu |
| Goodnight Song + YES! OK! (晚安歌+YES!OK!) | Ella Chen | Ella Chen | Three |
| Goodnight Song + YES! OK! (晚安歌+YES!OK!) | Ella Chen | Ella Chen | Yu Yan |
| Goodnight Song + YES! OK! (晚安歌+YES!OK!) | Ella Chen | Ella Chen | Zhang Yu |
| No Need To Guess (不用去猜) | Jony J | Jony J | Marco Lin |
| No Need To Guess (不用去猜) | Jony J | Jony J | NINEONE |
| No Need To Guess (不用去猜) | Jony J | Jony J | Sharon Wang |
| No Need To Guess (不用去猜) | Jony J | Jony J | Bunny Zhang |
| Never Give Up (不服) | Silence Wang | Silence Wang | Diamond |
| Never Give Up (不服) | Silence Wang | Silence Wang | DDD |
| Never Give Up (不服) | Silence Wang | Silence Wang | Momo |
| Never Give Up (不服) | Silence Wang | Silence Wang | Shaking |
| Never Give Up (不服) | Silence Wang | Silence Wang | Roada Xu |
| Never Give Up (不服) | Silence Wang | Silence Wang | Zhao Xiaotang |
| It's OK | Bi Wenjun, Lin Yanjun, Ling Chao, You Zhangjing, Li Xikan, Justin, Wang Linkai, Jeffrey, Zheng Ruibin, Lin Chaoze | Wang Linkai, Wang Ziyi, Zhu Zhengting | Flora Dai |
| It's OK | Bi Wenjun, Lin Yanjun, Ling Chao, You Zhangjing, Li Xikan, Justin, Wang Linkai, Jeffrey, Zheng Ruibin, Lin Chaoze | Wang Linkai, Wang Ziyi, Zhu Zhengting | Hana Lin |
| It's OK | Bi Wenjun, Lin Yanjun, Ling Chao, You Zhangjing, Li Xikan, Justin, Wang Linkai, Jeffrey, Zheng Ruibin, Lin Chaoze | Wang Linkai, Wang Ziyi, Zhu Zhengting | Frhanm Shangguan |
| It's OK | Bi Wenjun, Lin Yanjun, Ling Chao, You Zhangjing, Li Xikan, Justin, Wang Linkai, Jeffrey, Zheng Ruibin, Lin Chaoze | Wang Linkai, Wang Ziyi, Zhu Zhengting | Song Xinran |
| It's OK | Bi Wenjun, Lin Yanjun, Ling Chao, You Zhangjing, Li Xikan, Justin, Wang Linkai, Jeffrey, Zheng Ruibin, Lin Chaoze | Wang Linkai, Wang Ziyi, Zhu Zhengting | Tako Zhang |
| It's OK | Bi Wenjun, Lin Yanjun, Ling Chao, You Zhangjing, Li Xikan, Justin, Wang Linkai, Jeffrey, Zheng Ruibin, Lin Chaoze | Wang Linkai, Wang Ziyi, Zhu Zhengting | Bubble Zhu |
| It's OK | Bi Wenjun, Lin Yanjun, Ling Chao, You Zhangjing, Li Xikan, Justin, Wang Linkai, Jeffrey, Zheng Ruibin, Lin Chaoze | Wang Linkai, Wang Ziyi, Zhu Zhengting | Juicy Zuo |

=== Mission 5: Final Stage Performance ===
Color key

- Center

| Song | Position | Name |
|---|---|---|
| Hunt (猎) | Lead Vocalist | Aria Jin |
| Hunt (猎) | Support Vocalist 1 | K Lu |
| Hunt (猎) | Support Vocalist 2 | Liu Lingzi |
| Hunt (猎) | Support Vocalist 3 | Roada Xu |
| Hunt (猎) | Support Vocalist 4 | Three |
| Hunt (猎) | Support Vocalist 5 | Flora Dai |
| Hunt (猎) | Support Vocalist 6 | Esther Yu |
| Hunt (猎) | Support Vocalist 7 | Babymonster An |
| Hunt (猎) | Rapper 1 | Kiki Xu |
| Hunt (猎) | Rapper 2 | Zhao Xiaotang |
| A Little Bit (仅此而已) | Lead Vocalist 1 | Yu Yan |
| A Little Bit (仅此而已) | Lead Vocalist 2 | XIN Liu |
| A Little Bit (仅此而已) | Support Vocalist 1 | Sharon Wang |
| A Little Bit (仅此而已) | Support Vocalist 2 | Frhanm Shangguan |
| A Little Bit (仅此而已) | Support Vocalist 3 | Song Xinran |
| A Little Bit (仅此而已) | Support Vocalist 4 | Jenny Zeng |
| A Little Bit (仅此而已) | Support Vocalist 5 | Diamond |
| A Little Bit (仅此而已) | Support Vocalist 6 | NINEONE |
| A Little Bit (仅此而已) | Rapper 1 | Snow Kong |
| A Little Bit (仅此而已) | Rapper 2 | Shaking |

== Discography ==
=== Singles ===
| Title | Album details |
|---|---|
| Youth With You season 2 OST | Released: 18 March 2020; Language: Mandarin; Track listing: 1. YES! OK! |

== Production ==
Filming for Youth With You season 2 was affected by the COVID-19 pandemic. The production location in Guangdong was sealed, and filming was suspended beginning on 22 January 2020.

For promotional activities, Cai Xukun and Jony J appeared alongside five trainees—Xu Jiaqi, Shangguan Xiai, An Qi, Kong Xueer, and Wang Qing—on the program Happy Camp on 29 February 2020.

== Controversy ==
=== Shen Bing ===
On 25 March 2020, a man claiming to be Shen Bing's boyfriend posted a statement alleging that he had been in a relationship with her since September 2019 while concealing his marriage. He claimed that Shen Bing had made threatening comments to his wife after discovering his marital status. Following this, Shen Bing withdrew from the show, stating that she had been unaware of his marriage, contradicting the claims made by the man.

=== Final episode ===
During the final episode of Youth With You season 2, the live performance of the song Hunt received criticism for poor audio quality, which reportedly made some trainees' vocals difficult to hear. Netizens expressed disappointment with the performance and the audio production, and the topic trended on Weibo. In response, trainee Yu Shuxin performed an additional song to demonstrate her vocal abilities after some viewers criticized her performance in Hunt.

On the same day, Dove posted on Weibo to congratulate Liu Yuxin for placing first in the competition before the official results were announced. The post was later deleted. Dove subsequently clarified that congratulatory messages had been prepared in advance by staff.
