= Snow Kong =

Chinese singer and actress (born 1996)

- 孔雪儿
- Kong in Better Halves (2025)
- Born: Kong Xue er April 30, 1996 (age 30); Qianjiang, Hubei, China
- Occupations: Singer; actress
- Musical career
- Genres: C-pop; Mandopop; hip hop
- Instrument: Vocals
- Years active: 2012–present
- Labels: Mountain Top; iQiyi (Note: As a member of The9 only.); Idol Youth
- Formerly of: LadyBees; The9

Chinese name
- Simplified Chinese: 孔雪儿
- Hanyu Pinyin: Kǒng Xuě'ér

Kong Xueer (Chinese: 孔雪儿; born April 30, 1996), also known as Snow Kong, is a Chinese singer and actress. She is best known for finishing eighth in the iQiyi survival reality show Youth With You 2, becoming a member of girl group The9. As an actress, she is best known for her roles in The Double (2024), Blossom (2024), Blood River (2025) and Pursuit of Jade (2026).

== Career ==
=== 2012–2019: Career beginnings ===
In 2012, Kong participated in a talent show organized by the South Korean company JYP Entertainment and was selected as a trainee. She left the company in 2015. In March 2016, she participated in Zhejiang TV's Chinese girl group survival reality show Lady Bees. On May 28, 2016, she stood out in the final battle of the program and became a member of LadyBees.

In March 2018, Kong participated in the iQiyi dance reality show competition program Hot Blood Dance Crew. In November 2018, LadyBees released the single and mini-album entitled Queen Bee. The group disbanded in 2019.

=== 2020–present: Debut with The9 and solo endeavors ===
In 2020, Kong represented Mountain Top Entertainment alongside Zhao Xiaotang on the reality survival show Youth With You 2. On May 30, 2020, Kong placed 8th with a total of 4,001,966 votes in the final episode thus making her included in final group lineup. She officially debuted as a member of The9 on August 10, 2020.

== Discography ==
=== Singles ===
Title	Year	Peak chart positions	Album
Title	Year	CHN	Album
"Call Me By My Name" (Note: Song was released under The9, but is a solo track performed by Kong.)	2020	75	MatriX

=== Soundtrack appearances ===
Year	Title	Album
2022	"Love Secret Manual" (练爱秘笈)	It's Nothing More Than Love OST
2023	"Adventure of Love" (爱的冒险)	Mr. Insomnia Waiting for Love OST
2024	"March On" (前行)	The Land of Warriors
2025	"World's Number One" (天下第一)	Better Halves OST
2025	"Love Knot" (同心结) (with Ren Hao)	Better Halves OST

=== Composition credits ===
List of songs written or co-written, showing year released, artist name, and name of the album
Title	Year	Artist	Album	Credited
"Call Me By My Name"	2020	Snow Kong	MatriX	Yes

== Filmography ==
=== Television series ===
Year	Title	Role	Ref.
2020	The Wood	Du Xinyue	
2022	Sassy Beauty	Si Yan	
2022	It's Nothing More Than Love	Lin Xiaoyu	
2023	Mr. Insomnia Waiting for Love	Lu Entong	
2024	The Double	Zhi Yan	
2024	The Land of Warriors	Zhu Zhuqing	
2024	The Soulmate	Nan Yu	
2024	Blossom	Miao Ansu	
2025	The Prisoner of Beauty	Zheng Shu / Zheng Chuyu	
2025	Serendipity	Duan Shujun	
2025	Better Halves	Shi Fake	
2025	Legend of the Female General	Mu Hongjin (young)	
2025	Moonlit Reunion	Xie Yao	
2025	Blood River	Mu Xuewei	
2026	Pursuit of Jade	Yu Qianqian	
2026	Blossoms of Power	Li Yan	
2026	The Shadow Sovereign	Li Shu / Princess Zhaoyang	
TBA	The Days of Seclusion and Love	Yi Zhangzhu	
TBA	Burning Night	Lou Jinyu	
TBA	Empress Reborn	Shen Yue	

=== Television shows ===
Year	Title	Role	Notes	Ref.
2016	Lady Bees	Contestant		
2020	Youth With You 2	Contestant	Finished 8th	
2020	Treasured Village	Cast member		

== Awards and nominations ==
Year	Award	Category	Nominee(s)/Work(s)	Result	Ref.
2025	Tencent Video Star Awards	Best Promising Television Actor of the Year	Snow Kong	Won	
