= Duan Yixuan =

Chinese idol singer

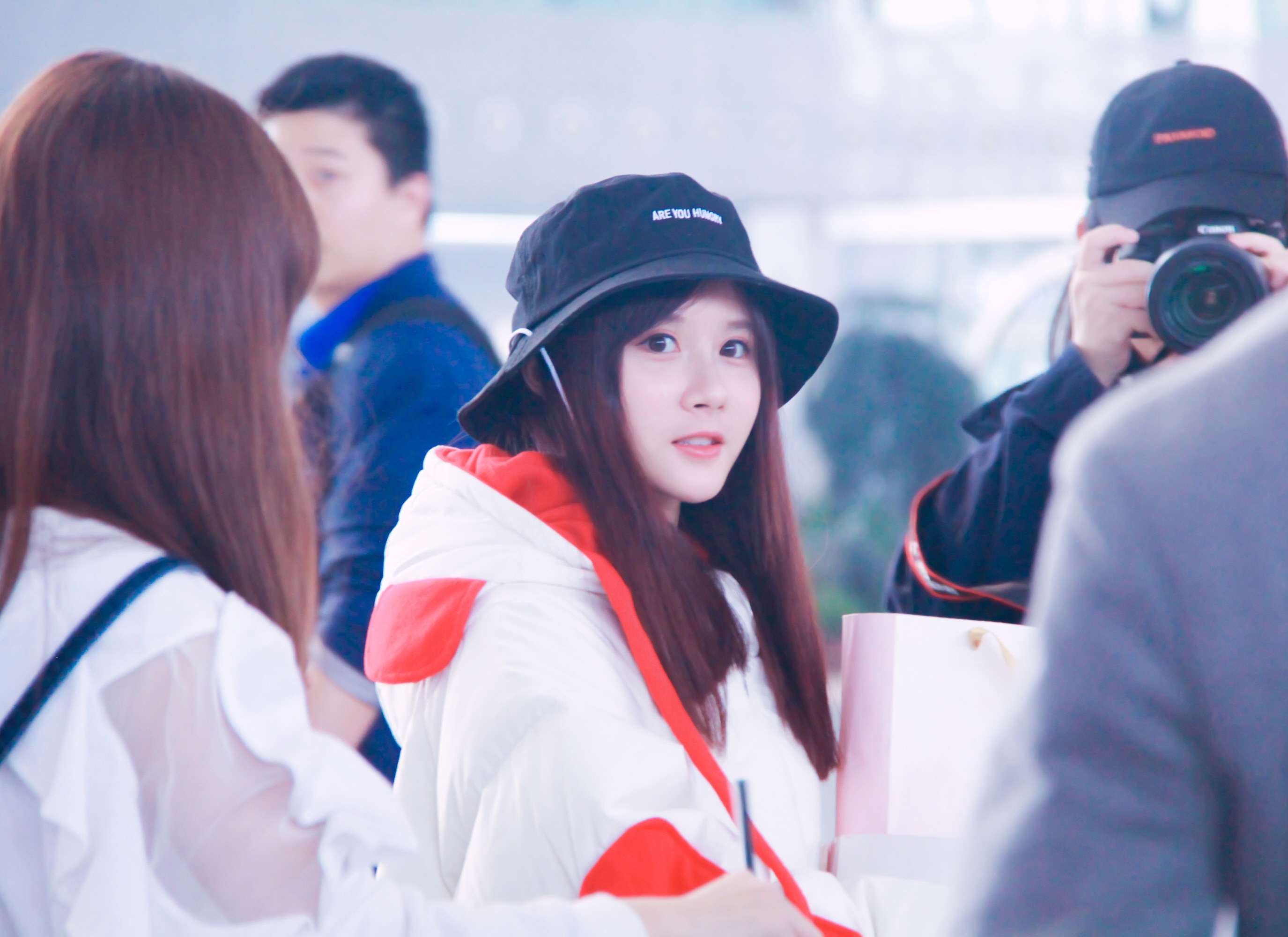
- Duan in March 2018
- Born: August 19, 1995 (age 30); Chenzhou, Hunan, China
- Other names: DDD
- Occupations: Singer; actress
- Years active: 2015–present

Chinese name
- Traditional Chinese: 段藝璇
- Simplified Chinese: 段艺璇
Transcriptions
Standard Mandarin
- Hanyu Pinyin: Duàn Yìxuán
- Musical career
- Origin: China
- Genres: Pop, Mandopop
- Instrument: Vocals
- Labels: Star48; Ninestyle Model Agency; Ninestyle Music

Duan Yixuan (simplified Chinese: 段艺璇; traditional Chinese: 段藝璇; pinyin: Duàn Yìxuán; born August 19, 1995, in Chenzhou, Hunan, central southern part of China) is a Chinese singer and actress, and former member of Chinese idol group SNH48, of which she was the Captain of Team SII.

== Career ==
On July 25, 2015, during SNH48's second General Election, Duan was announced as one of the fifth-generation members of SNH48. On December 4, she made her first public performance during Team XII's first stage, "Theater no Megami". On December 26, she participated in SNH48's second Request Time.

On April 20, 2016, Duan was transferred to BEJ48, and became part of Team B. On April 29, she made her stage debut as a BEJ48 member during Team B's first stage, "Theater no Megami". On May 20, she became part of the senbatsu for SNH48's twelfth EP, "Dream Land". On July 30, during SNH48's third General Election, she was ranked 43rd with 12477.2 votes, meanwhile she came in second within BEJ48, becoming part of BEJ48's Top 7. On September 15, she was appointed captain of Team B.

On January 7, 2017, Duan participated in SNH48's third Request Time. On March 4, she was voted as BEJ48 Annual Theater MVP for the year 2016. On July 29, during SNH48's fourth General Election, Duan came in 13th with 46825.4 votes, at the same time she became the top member in BEJ48. As such, she held the center position on BEJ48's fourth EP, "Variety Exclamation Mark", released on September 30.

On January 12, 2018, Duan took on her first leading role in time-traveling web drama A Journey to Tang. Starting May 6, she served as a Chinese commentator for the first semi-final of Eurovision Song Contest 2018. On July 28, she came in 15th with 53190.64 votes during SNH48 Group's fifth General Election, becoming part of the senbatsu.

On April 20, 2019, Duan resigned as captain of Team B. On July 27, during SNH48 Group's sixth General Election, she was ranked third, becoming the first sister group member to rank among the top three.

On March 12, 2020, Duan participated in Youth With You (Idol Producer Season 3).

On September 4, 2020, due to prolonged closure of the BEJ48 theatre, Duan relocated to Shanghai and joined Team SII of SNH48.

On August 23, 2025, Duan officially graduated from SNH48.

== Discography ==
=== With BEJ48 ===
==== EPs ====
Year	No.	Title	Role	Notes
2016	1	The Awakening	A-side	Also sang on "Galaxy Party" and "Youth Side by Side" with Team B, center with Chen Meijun on the latter
2017	2	Smiling Sunflower	A-side	Also sang on "Love like Fantasy" with Team B, center, and "Promise Under the Stars" with BEJ48 Top 7
2017	3	Manifesto	A-side	Also sang on "Sunshine Concerto" with Team B, center, and "Glory Medal" with all BEJ48 members, center with Li Zi
2017	4	Variety Exclamation Mark	A-side	Center; Also sang on "Irreplaceable" with Team B

=== With SNH48 ===
==== EPs ====
Year	No.	Title	Role	Notes
2016	12	Dream Land	A-side	
2016	13	Princess's Cloak	B-side	Sang on "A Yo Ai Yo" with Next Girls; Also sang on "Love of the spacious items" with BEJ48
2017	16	Summer Pirates	B-side	Sang on "Choose me for you" with Team B, center
2017	17	Dawn in Naples	A-side	
2017	18	Sweet Festival	A-side	Also sang on "First wish" with BEJ48, center

== Units ==
=== Stage Units ===
Stage No.	Song	Notes
Team XII 1st Stage "Theater no Megami"	Arashi no Yoru ni wa 暴风雨之夜	With Shi Yujie, Chen Ke and Hu Xiaohui; B Lineup
Team B 1st Stage "Theater no Megami"	Arashi no Yoru ni wa 暴风雨之夜	With Qing Yuwen, Sun Shan and Niu Congcong
Team B 2nd Stage "Journey of the Heart"	Horizon 地平线	Center; With Chen Yifei, Tian Shuli, Hu Bowen and Xia Yue

=== Concert units ===
Year	Date	Name	Song	Notes
2016	30 July	3rd General Election Concert	None	None
2017	7 January	Request Hour Setlist Best 50 (3rd Edition)	Seifuku Resistance 再见制服	With Song Xinran and Zhang Dansan
2020	15 August	7th General Election Concert	Gravity 重力	

== Filmography ==
=== Web series ===
Year	Title	Role	Notes
2018	大唐嘻游记 A Journey to Tang	Qin Xiaoxiao	

=== Others ===
Year	Title	Role	Notes
2018	Eurovision Song Contest 2018 Semifinal 1	Chinese commentator	With Hei Nan
