= Jony J =

Chinese rapper

- 肖佳
- Born: December 28, 1989 (age 36); Fuzhou, Fujian, China
- Education: Nanjing Institute of Visual Arts
- Occupations: Rapper; singer; songwriter
- Years active: 2013–present
- Musical career
- Genres: Hip hop
- Instrument: Vocals
- Label: Shooc Studio

Xiao Jia (Chinese: 肖佳, born December 28, 1989), known professionally as Jony J, is a Chinese rapper and songwriter. Born and raised in Fuzhou, China, he made his rapping debut through releasing a mixtape in 2013. In 2016, Jony J founded his record label Shooc Studio and released his debut studio album. In 2017, he took part in the Chinese competition show, The Rap of China, and won fourth place. In 2020, Jony J served as a rap mentor in the Chinese girl group survival reality show Youth With You.

== Early life ==
Xiao Jia was born in Fuzhou in 1989 and moved to Yancheng. In 2006, he attended Nanjing Institute of Visual Arts. When he was in college, he signed a temporary contract with a record label and became a pub singer to perform in various cities, but later he rejected to sign the formal contract.

== Career ==
=== 2013–2018: Early career and awards ===
In 2013, Jony J released his debut mixtape, J Hood with the title track "My City Nanjing". The mixtape was popular enough to launch an 11 city national tour. Following the tour, in 2014 he released the music video for "My City Nanjing" which went viral on Chinese social media. In 2016, he founded his record label Shooc Studio and released his first studio album, 物女金; Wu Nu Jin followed by another national tour across 15 cities.

On March 25, 2017, Jony J won the Most Popular Rapper Award at the 6th China Hip-Hop Awards. On May 14, he participated at the Strawberry Music Festival in Chengdu. Jony J finished in fourth place in the Chinese competition show The Rap of China, but was eliminated in Episode 4 during a "one-on-one battle" with Gui Bian. He was later revived following fan votes before being eliminated in the final.

On January 17, 2018, Jony J won the Most Popular Male Musician Award at the 2017 NetEase Cloud Music Original Music Festival. On November 26, 2018, he released his second studio album Past Future Shooc (Chinese: 喜新戀舊), the album was released alongside an associated clothing line with SSUR*PLUS and a 6 city national tour. The same year, Jony J participated in the Tencent Video idol pairing competition music reality show Chao Yin Zhan Ji (潮音战纪), but withdrew from the competition as he had to comply with the reorganization rules.

=== 2019–present ===
In 2019, Jony J went on his first world tour, performing in five cities across the United States, Canada, Taiwan, and Hong Kong. In 2020, Jony J served as a rap mentor in Season 2 of the Chinese girl group survival show Youth with You. The same year, he collaborated with Taiwanese singer Jolin Tsai for "Who Am I", an OST of Chinese drama The Wolf. On December 27, 2023, Jony J released his third studio album 24 AM (24时) followed by a 19 city national tour.

== Personal life ==
On February 29, 2020, Jony J and his fiancée gave birth to a daughter. The couple married on September 6, 2023.

== Musical image ==
Jony J is known by fans as "the hip hop poet", for his introspective songwriting style and down to earth demeanor.

== Discography ==
Singles
Title	Year	Notes	Ref.
"J Hood"	2013	Debut mixtape	
"开门见山; Kaimenjiashan"	2015		
"防火线; Fanghuo Xian" feat. Lexie Liu	2015		
"Big things start small"	2017		
"甜葡萄 红眼睛; Tian Putao Hong Yanjing" with Gui Bian (鬼卞)	2017	Produced for and performed on The Rap of China	
"不用去猜; Buyong Qu Cai"	2017	Produce for and performed on The Rap of China	
"你看得见; Ni Kan De Jian"	2017		
"Slave" (奴隶)	2018		
"Rejuvenation" (返老还童; feat Tiger Hu)	2018	Collaboration single	
"Why We Here" with GONG	2019		
"迷宫; Migong"	2019		
"Best Partner" (最佳拍档)	2020		
"顽家; Wan Jia"	2020		
"周润发; Zhourunfa"	2021		

Albums
Title	Year	Notes	Ref.
Wu Nu Jin (物女金)	2016	Debut studio album	
Past Future Shooc (喜新戀舊)	2018	Studio album	
24 AM (24時)	2023	Studio album	
24 AM (Live Version) (24時·演唱会新编自选辑)	2025	Live concert album	
