= Su Shanshan =

Female Chinese singer and actress

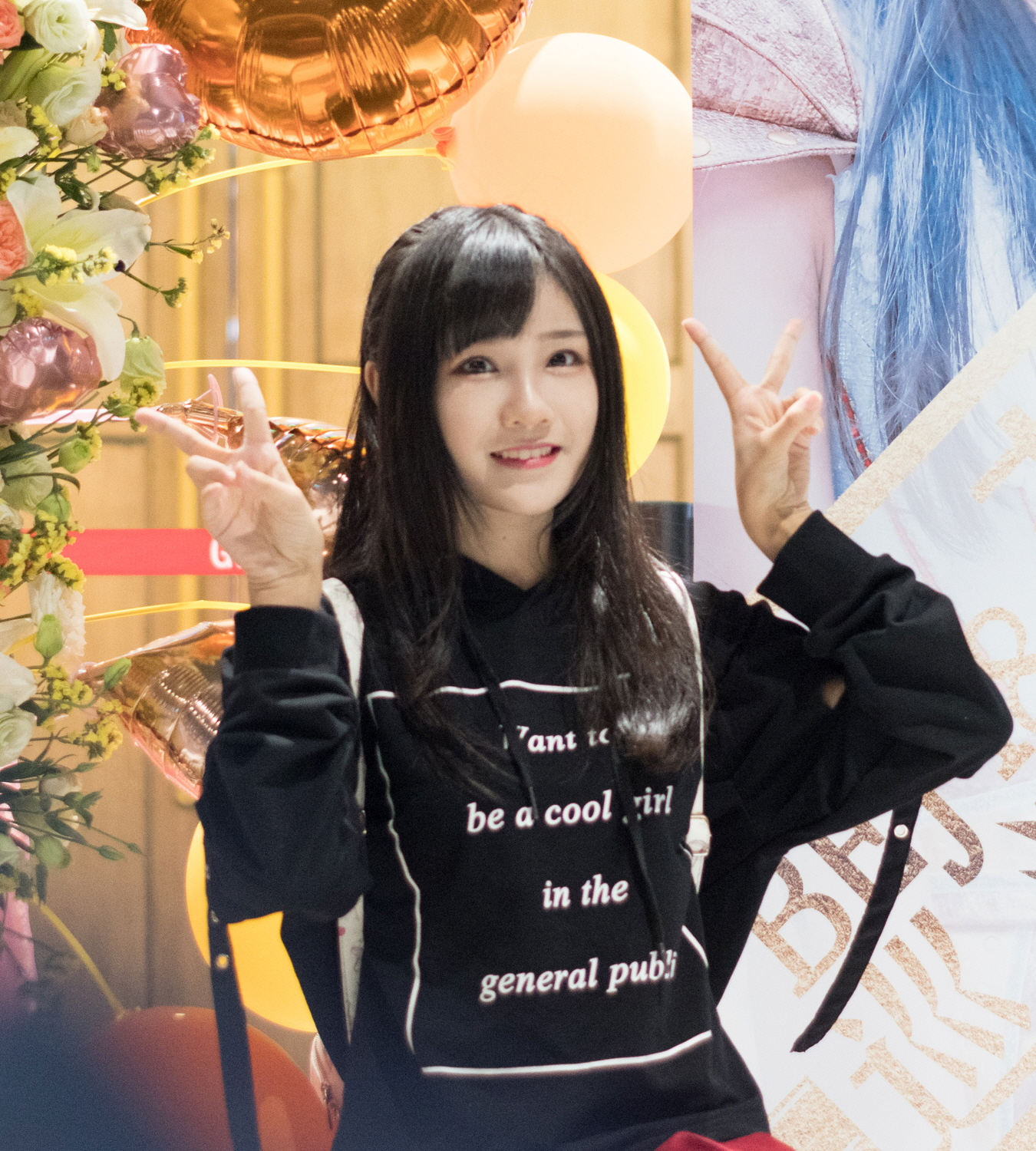
- Born: March 23, 1997 (age 28); Suizhou, Hubei, China
- Occupations: Singer, actress
- Years active: 2016-present

Chinese name
- Traditional Chinese: 蘇杉杉
- Simplified Chinese: 苏杉杉
Transcriptions
Standard Mandarin
- Hanyu Pinyin: Sū Shānshān
- Musical career
- Origin: China
- Genres: Pop, Mandopop
- Instruments: Vocals, guitar
- Labels: Star48; Ninestyle Model Agency; Ninestyle Music
- Member of: SNH48
- Formerly of: BEJ48

Su Shanshan (Chinese: 苏杉杉; born March 23, 1997, in Suizhou, Hubei) is a Chinese singer and actress, and member of Chinese idol group SNH48, as part of Team NII. Previously, she was a member of BEJ48's Team E.

== Career ==
On January 18, 2016, Su became a 6th-generation member of SNH48, and on April 20, she was transferred to BEJ48's Team E. On April 29, she made her first public performance as a member of BEJ48 during Team E's first stage, "Pajama Drive". In May, Japanese media referred to her as a "once in 40,000 years beauty" due to the many selfies she posted on Weibo. On June 20, Su was part of the judging panel for talent-scouting competition I'm a Big Talent Scout (我是大星探). On July 30, during SNH48's third General Election, Su came in seventh within BEJ48, becoming part of BEJ48's Top 7. On September 38, she, along with the rest of BEJ48's Top 7, was involved in a photoshoot for the October issue of the Chinese-language edition of L'Officiel Hommes. On November 27, she became an official spokesperson for the iQIYI TV Fruit.

On January 7, 2017, Su participated in the SNH48 Request Hour Setlist Best 50 (3rd Edition). On May 9, she attended the press conference for the SNK and iDRAGONS Creative Studio-produced The King of Fighters: Destiny. On July 29, during SNH48's fourth General Election, she came in 21st with 32151 votes, and became part of the Under Girls. Meanwhile, she came in second within BEJ48.

On February 3, 2018, Su participated in SNH48's fourth Request Time, in which the song "Four Seasons", performed with SHY48's Wang Shimeng, BEJ48's Feng Sijia and SNH48's Zhang Dansan, came in first. As she was the center of the song, she was awarded with a solo music video.

== Discography ==
=== With BEJ48 ===
==== EPs ====
Year	No.	Title	Role	Notes
2016	1	The Awakening	A-side	Also sang on "Mini Angel" and "Hello! Mr. Future" with Team E
2017	2	Smiling Sunflower	A-side	Also sang on "Silver and White Melody" with Team E, and "Promise Under the Stars" with BEJ48 Top 7
2017	3	Manifesto	A-side	Also sang on "Love Card" with Team E, and "Glory Medal" with all BEJ48 members
2017	4	Variety Exclamation Mark	A-side	Also sang on "Gift" with Team E

=== With SNH48 ===
==== EPs ====
Year	No.	Title	Role	Notes
2016	12	Dream Land	A-side	
2016	13	Princess's Cloak	B-side	Sang on "Love of the spacious items" with BEJ48
2017	16	Summer Pirates	B-side	Sang on "Very Much Ice Cream" with Team E
2017	17	Dawn in Naples	A-side	Ranked 21st in the 4th General Election; Sang on "Glorious Times" with Under Girls
2017	18	Sweet Festival	B-side	Sang on "First wish" with BEJ48

=== Original Singles ===
Year	Title	Notes
2018	Tritone	Original Single
2018	Universe	Original Single

== Units ==
=== Stage Units ===
Stage No.	Song	Notes
Team E 1st Stage "Pajama Drive"	Kagami no Naka no Jean Da Arc 镜中圣女	With Liu Shengnan, Zhang Xiaoying, Xu Siyang and Feng Sijia
Team E 2nd Stage "Fantasy Coronation"	The Magic of Love 爱的魔法	With Li Shiyan, Liu Shengnan and Ma Yuling

=== Concert units ===
Year	Date	Name	Song	Notes
2017	January 7	Request Hour Setlist Best 50 (3rd Edition)	Tsundere! 傲娇女孩	With He Xiaoyu and Chen Jiaying

== Filmography ==
=== Web series ===
Year	Date	Title	Role	Notes
2017	January 12	A Journey to Tang 大唐嘻游记	Imperial concubine Xiao 萧妃	
