= Lu Keran =

Chinese singer and dancer (born 1995)

- 陆柯燃
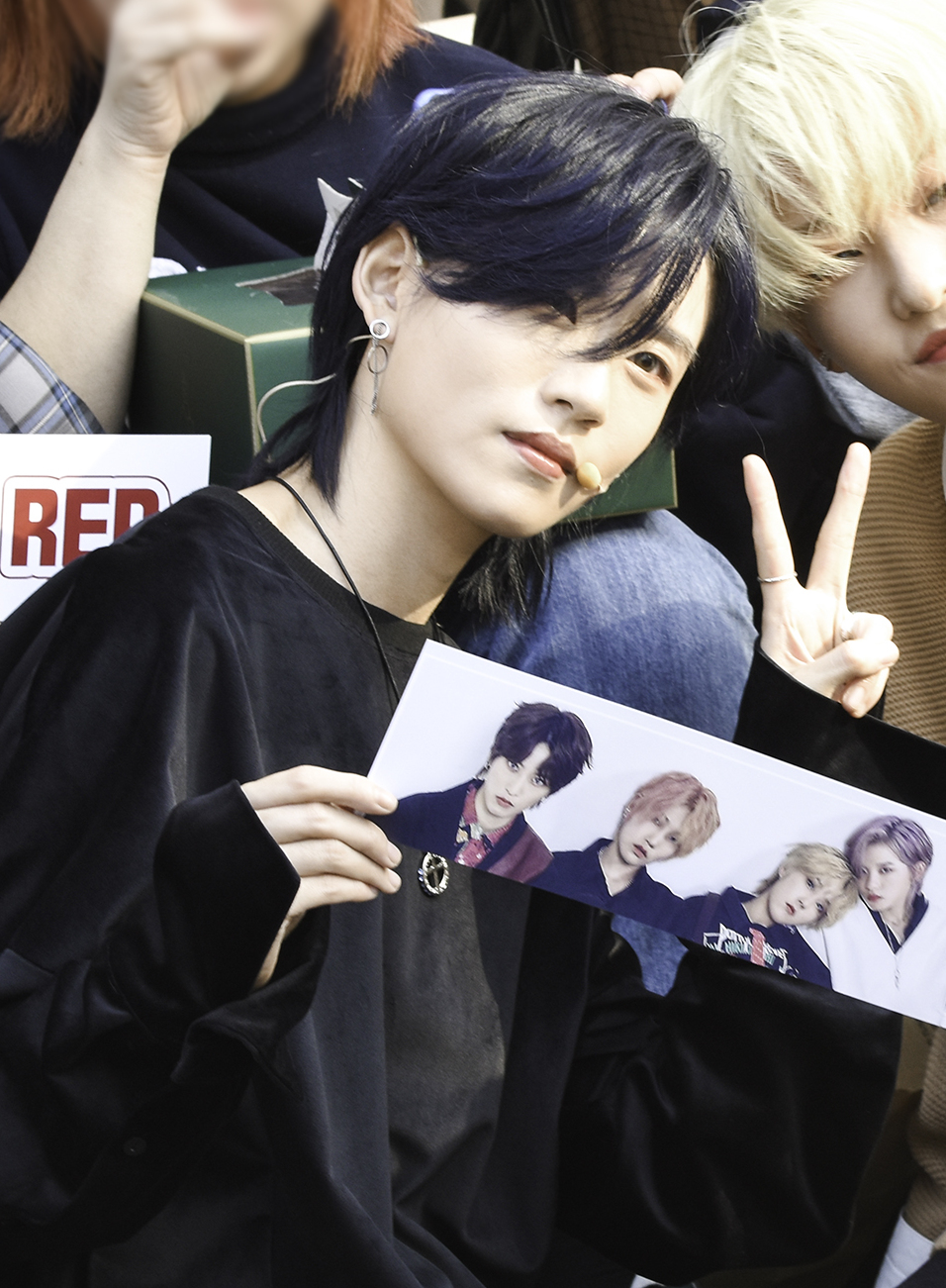
- Born: Lu Jie; November 7, 1995 (age 30); Nanjing, China
- Other name: K Lu
- Occupations: Singer; dancer
- Musical career
- Genres: C-pop; Mandopop
- Instrument: Vocals
- Years active: 2017–present
- Labels: FFC; TOV; ADQC (Note: As a member of The9 only.); iQiyi
- Website: tovglobal.com

Lu Keran
- Traditional Chinese: 陸柯燃
- Simplified Chinese: 陆柯燃
Transcriptions
Standard Mandarin
- Hanyu Pinyin: Lù Kērán

Lu Keran (Chinese: 陆柯燃; Korean: 루커란; born Lu Jie [陆婕]; November 7, 1995), better known by her stage name K, is a Chinese singer and dancer. She is the leader of girl group Fanxy Red. She is also a former member of Chinese girl group The9, after finishing ninth in iQIYI's survival reality program Youth with You 2.

== Early life ==
Keran was born on November 7, 1995, in Nanjing, China. She played competitive fencing for six years, and even went to a special athletic academy to be a competitive fencer.

== Filmography ==
=== Variety and Reality Shows ===
Year	English Title	Chinese Title	Role	Network	Notes	Ref.
2020	Youth With You 2	青春有你第二季	Contestant	iQiyi	Finished at 9th place	
2020	Let's Party! 2020	非日常派对	Herself	iQiyi		
2020	Who's the Drama Queen?	青春加点戏	Herself	iQiyi	Appear on Ep. 1 and Ep. 11	
2020	Go Fighting! Season 6	极限挑战	Herself	iQiyi	Guest appearance	
2021	Stage Boom	爆裂舞台	Contestant	iQiyi		
2021	Youth With You 3	青春有你第三季	Herself	iQiyi	Senior mentor collaboration performance	

== Discography ==
=== Single albums ===
Title	Album details	Peak chart positions	Sales
Title	Album details	KOR	Sales
21G	Released: February 18, 2022; Label: TOV Entertainment; Formats: digital download; Track listing: 1. "Waiting for U"; 2. "Ride"	—	—N/a

=== Singles ===
Title	Year	Peak chart positions	Sales	Album
Title	Year	KOR	Sales	Album
"Waiting for U"	2022	—	—N/a	21G
"Text Me" (featuring Benzo)	2023	—	—N/a	—N/a
"—" denotes song did not chart or was not released in that region.

== Activities ==
Event or Title	Date	Remarks
PETA Pet Adoption Ad Campaign	June 15, 2017	with FFC-Acrush
Hangzhou Animal Protection Association Charity Concert	June 23, 2017	with FFC-Acrush
MV for Workers on the Coronavirus Frontline	February 1, 2020	with trainees of Youth With You 2
China Foundation for Poverty Alleviation Donate A Yuan for Love Advocate	August 16, 2020	
iQiyi Love Power	August 18, 2020	with The9
China Foundation for Poverty Alleviation Philanthropy Ambassador	September 9, 2020	with The9
Book Love Hope Philanthropy Ambassador	September 21, 2020	with The9
UNICEF World Smile Day Event	November 19, 2020	with The9

== Additional ==
The artist has modeled in multiple fashion magazines, including Vanity Teen.
