= S.H.E filmography =

S.H.E is a Taiwanese girl group that specializes in pop music, and consists of Selina Jen, Hebe Tian, and Ella Chen. Over the course of their career, the trio has not only released nine albums, but have also hosted several television programs and acted in numerous dramas.

== Sign ==
x is participate in filmography for members of S.H.E

== Television Hosting ==
Date	Name	S	H	E
February 2002 - July 2002	我猜我猜我猜猜猜; Guess Guess Guess	x	x	x
March 2003 - February 2004	快樂星期天; Happy Sunday	x	x	x
January 2007 - June 2007	我猜我猜我猜猜猜; Guess Guess Guess	x	x	x

== Drama Series ==
Date	Name	S	H	E
January; 2002	愛情大魔咒; Magical Love		x	x
May; 2003	薔薇之恋; The Rose	x	x	x
January; 2004	新年快樂2004; Happy New Year 2004	x	x	
March; 2004	求婚事務所; Say Yes Enterprise		x	
October; 2005	真命天女; Reaching For The Stars	x	x	x
November; 2006	花樣少年少女; Hanazakarino Kimitachihe			x
July; 2007	棒棒堂偶像劇; The Lollipop Idol Drama	x	x	x
November; 2007	鬥牛。要不要; Bull Fighting		x	
January; 2010	就想賴著妳; Down With Love			x
October; 2014	謊言遊戲 (谎言游戏); The Lying Game			x

== Movies Series ==
Date	Name	S	H	E
February; 2004	冒牌天皇; A Disguised Superstar	x	x	
February; 2007	亞瑟的奇幻王國：毫髮人的冒險; Arthur and the Minimoys	x	x	x
January; 2012	新天生一對; New Perfect Two			x
April; 2012	女孩坏坏; Bad Girls			x
May; 2015	缺角一族; The Missing Piece			x
February; 2019	大三元; Big Three Dragons			x
