= Ella Chen discography =

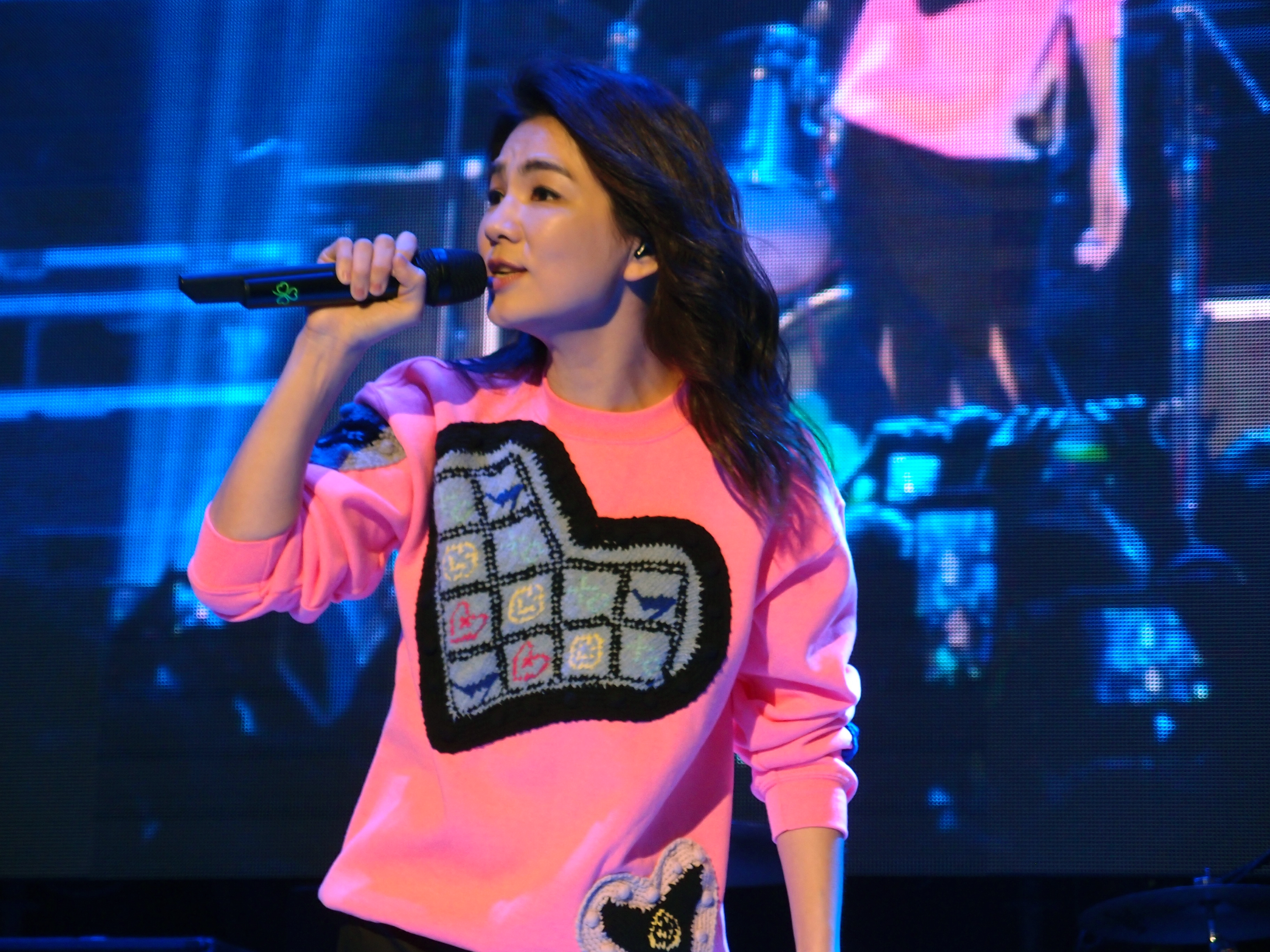
- Studio albums: 2
- EPs: 3
- Music videos: 20

Taiwanese singer Ella Chen (Chinese: 陳嘉樺) has released one studio album and three Extended plays. She is a member of the Taiwanese girl-group S.H.E, and released her debut solo album, Why Not, in 2015.

== Albums ==
=== Studio albums ===
Title	Released	Label	Sales
Why Not	April 17, 2015	HIM	No.9 (Taiwan)
Bad Habits	April 1, 2024	EHalo Entertainment	

=== Extended plays ===
Title	Released	Label	ref.
薔薔 (pinyin: Qiáng Qiáng)	August 24, 2007	HIM	
To Be Ella	March 30, 2012	HIM	
Me vs. Me (Chinese: 渾身是勁)	October 28, 2016	HIM	
Ella Show Entertainment Unlimited Company	November 16, 2020	EHalo Entertainment	Digital Download

== Singles ==
Title	Released	Label	Link
"How Old Are You" (都幾歲了)	June 5, 2019	EHalo Entertainment	MV
"Stop Nagging" (囉哩叭唆)	July 24, 2019	EHalo Entertainment	MV
"Goodnight" (晚安歌)	June 8, 2020	EHalo Entertainment	MV
"Don't Wanna Be A Song Without A Chorus" (人生不能沒副歌)	2020	EHalo Entertainment	MV
"A CA ELLA"	2020	EHalo Entertainment	MV
"Entertainment Unlimited Company" (娛樂無限公司)	2020	EHalo Entertainment	MV
"Grain of Sand" (沙粒)	March 18, 2022	Mstones International	MV

== Collaborations ==
Title	Released	From
"Are you all right" feat. Selina Jen	September 11, 2001	Girls' Dorm
"You're Written in My Song" feat. Sodagreen	November 11, 2011	What's the Trouble on Your Mind (你在煩惱什麼)
"Know me before you love me" feat. Tank	March 30, 2012	To Be Ella
"歹逗陣" (Taiwanese Romanization System:pháinn tàu-tīn) feat. Jody Chiang	May 18, 2013	遠走高飛 (Taiwanese Romanization System:Uán-tsáu-ko-hui)
"Anytime Is Happy Time" feat. William Wei	August 29, 2018	2018 "Taiwan Beer" advertising song (Theme music)
"Like Boom Boom" feat. Nine One One	August 16, 2019	Like Boom Boom (來個蹦蹦)
"We are, We can be"	October 15, 2020	
"Summer" feat. OSN	March 3, 2022	Summer (野夏天)

== Soundtracks ==
Title	Year	From
"Don't"	2001	Girls' Dorm
"Only Then"	2005	Reaching for the Stars Original Soundtrack
"Don't (2016)"	2016	Irreplaceable
"Finally In Love"	2018	Dude's Manual (脫單告急)(Chinese movie)
"Puppet"	2018	Shadow (影)(Chinese movie)
"Heartless" feat. Derek Chang	2019	Big Three Dragons (大三元)(Taiwanese movie)
"Life Playing Backward" (倒放的一生)	2025	Ling Cage (灵笼) ; Anime Insert Song
"Rain All Over the World" (全世界的雨)	2026	All Wishes Come True! (八仙!) ; Theme Song
