= It's Me Tour =

2025– concert tour by Ella Chen

- Tour by Ella Chen
- Location: Asia
- Start date: November 15, 2025

Ella Chen concert chronology
- Ella Show Entertainment Unlimited (2020-2022); It's Me Concert Tour (2025-)

The It's Me Concert Tour (Chinese: It's Me 艾拉主意巡迴演唱會) is the second solo concert tour by Taiwanese singer Ella Chen.

== Promotion ==
On September 10, 2025, she officially announced her second solo concert tour, It's Me, releasing a video featuring a S.H.E reunion to generate publicity for the tour. This was followed on September 14, 2025, by a second promotional trailer supported by over 50 celebrity friends.

On October 28, 2025, the digital single "It's Me" (Chinese: 一直迷), serving as the theme song for the tour, was officially released across all major streaming platforms at midnight.

== Commercial performance ==
The tour opened in Changsha, the home base of Ride the Wind 2023, on November 15, 2025. Due to strong ticket sales, a second show was added on November 16.

== Background ==
In April 2023, Ella Chen participated in the reality competition show Ride the Wind 2023 in Changsha. After 111 days of competition, she won the overall championship. Over the next two years, Chen accumulated energy through various performances, commercial appearances, and music festivals, which inspired her first solo concert tour.

Changsha was chosen as the kick-off city for the tour, holding special emotional significance for Chen as the place where her "ride the wind" journey began. Returning to this meaningful city marked a major milestone in her music career.

== Tour history ==
The tour opened on November 15, 2025, in Changsha, the home base of Ride the Wind 2023. Due to strong ticket sales, a second show was added on November 16. Starting with the Beijing stop, the tour entered its "second half" (version 2.0), featuring an updated setlist, revamped costumes, and adjusted performance segments.

== Overview ==
Regarding the tour's concept, Chen explained that the title reflects an attitude of love and belief, intended to convey warmth and positivity to her long-time supporters. She described the tour not merely as a standard performance, but as a shared emotional experience with her fans. According to the organizers, the stage design and classic setlist were curated to evoke nostalgic memories. Chen also framed the event as a large-scale "party", encouraging the audience to sing, dance, and release their stress during the shows.

The concerts opened with Chen wearing the "Spark Queen" costume. Inspired by an exploding firework, the outfit took 500 hours to craft, integrating over 250 handcrafted firework motifs and thousands of crystals into a tailored suit structure. Additionally, Chen personally designed an exclusive illuminated wristband named the "Little Sun", which was distributed to all attendees. The shows also featured an interactive segment titled "Consulting Ella" (Chinese: 艾拉問事) to engage with the audience. In the latter half of the performance, Chen appeared in a "Cyber Fighter" outfit. This look utilized neon blue and purple tones, multi-layered digital prints, and 3D printing techniques, with patterns artistically reconstructed from her iconic looks over the years.

== Tour dates ==
List of tour dates
No.	Date	City	Country	Venue	Ref.
1	November 15, 2025	Changsha	China	Helong Stadium	
2	November 16, 2025	Changsha	China	Helong Stadium	
3	November 28, 2025	Hangzhou	China	Hangzhou Olympic Sports Center Tennis Center	
4	November 29, 2025	Hangzhou	China	Hangzhou Olympic Sports Center Tennis Center	
5	December 20, 2025	Guangzhou	China	Guangzhou Asian Games Town Gymnasium	
6	December 21, 2025	Guangzhou	China	Guangzhou Asian Games Town Gymnasium	
7	January 24, 2026	Shanghai	China	Shanghai Oriental Sports Center	
8	January 25, 2026	Shanghai	China	Shanghai Oriental Sports Center	
9	February 7, 2026	Nanning	China	Guangxi Sports Center Gymnasium	
10	February 8, 2026	Nanning	China	Guangxi Sports Center Gymnasium	
11	March 7, 2026	Xi'an	China	Xi'an Olympic Sports Center Gymnasium	
12	March 8, 2026	Xi'an	China	Xi'an Olympic Sports Center Gymnasium	
13	March 21, 2026	Chongqing	China	Chongqing International Expo Center	
14	March 22, 2026	Chongqing	China	Chongqing International Expo Center	
15	April 4, 2026	Fuzhou	China	Fuzhou Strait Olympic Sports Center Gymnasium	
16	April 5, 2026	Fuzhou	China	Fuzhou Strait Olympic Sports Center Gymnasium	
17	April 18, 2026	Nanjing	China	Nanjing Olympic Sports Center Gymnasium	
18	April 19, 2026	Nanjing	China	Nanjing Olympic Sports Center Gymnasium	
19	May 2, 2026	Suzhou	China	Suzhou Olympic Sports Centre Gymnasium	
20	May 3, 2026	Suzhou	China	Suzhou Olympic Sports Centre Gymnasium	
21	May 30, 2026	Qingdao	China	Qingdao Citizen Fitness Center Gymnasium	
22	May 31, 2026	Qingdao	China	Qingdao Citizen Fitness Center Gymnasium	
23	June 27, 2026	Chengdu	China	Phoenix Hill Sports Park Gymnasium	
24	June 28, 2026	Chengdu	China	Phoenix Hill Sports Park Gymnasium	
25	July 4, 2026	Tianjin	China	Tianjin Arena	
26	July 5, 2026	Tianjin	China	Tianjin Arena	
27	July 18, 2026	Xiamen	China	Xiamen Olympic Sports Center Phoenix Arena	
28	August 1, 2026	Shaoxing	China	Xishi Basketball Center	
29	August 2, 2026	Shaoxing	China	Xishi Basketball Center	
30	August 15, 2026	Beijing	China	Wukesong Arena	
31	August 16, 2026	Beijing	China	Wukesong Arena	
32	August 29, 2026	Nanchang	China	Nanchang International Sport Center Indoor Arena	
33	August 30, 2026	Nanchang	China	Nanchang International Sport Center Indoor Arena	
34	September 12, 2026	Taiyuan	China	Shanxi Sports Center	
35	September 26, 2026	Dongguan	China	Bank of Dongguan Basketball Center	
36	September 27, 2026	Dongguan	China	Bank of Dongguan Basketball Center	
37	October 10, 2026	Ningbo	China	Ningbo Olympic Sports Center	
38	October 11, 2026	Ningbo	China	Ningbo Olympic Sports Center	
39	October 24, 2026	Ürümqi	China	Ürümqi Olympic Sports Center	
40	November 7, 2026	Zhengzhou	China	Zhengzhou Olympic Sports Center	
41	January 9, 2027	Macau		Venetian Arena	
42	January 10, 2027	Macau		Venetian Arena	

== Accolades ==
Year	Organization	Category	Class	Work	Result	Ref.
2026	MUSE Creative Awards	Event - Concert	Platinum Winner	It's Me Tour	Won	
2026	London Design Awards	Conceptual Design - Entertainment	Platinum Winner	It's Me Tour	Won	
2026	K-Design Award	Communication	Gold Winner	It's Me Tour	Won	
