= Zaizai Lin =

Taiwanese actress (born 1990)

- 林辰唏
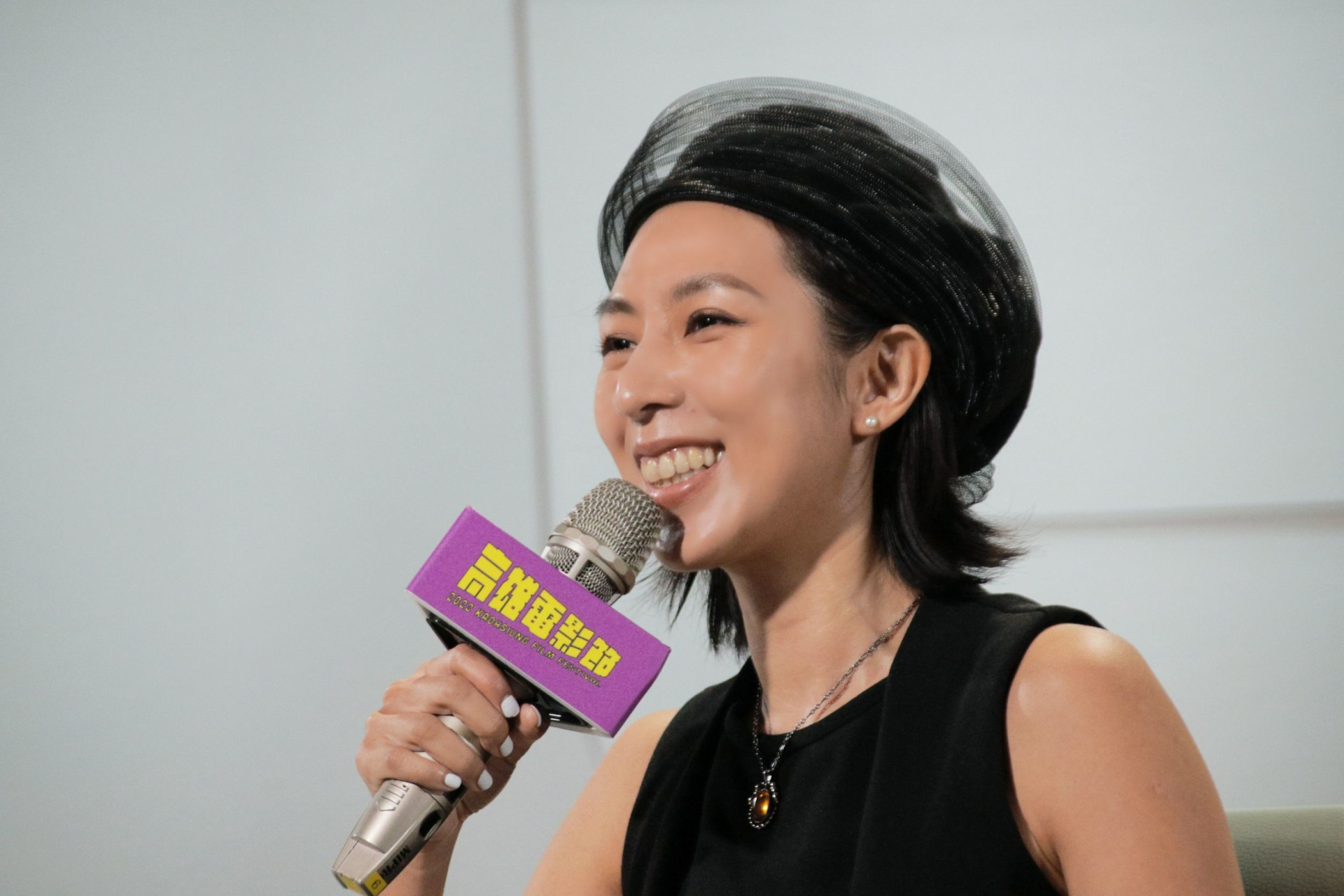
- Lin in October 2022
- Born: Lin Chen-shi; 22 May 1990 (age 36); Taiwan
- Occupation: Actress
- Years active: 2010–present
- Partner: Lin Li-shu
- Children: 1

Zaizai Lin Chen-shi (Note: Also credited as Mathilde Lin.) (Chinese: 林辰唏; pinyin: Lín Chén Xī; born 22 May 1990) is a Taiwanese actress. She made her acting debut in Taipei Exchanges (2010), and was nominated for Best Leading Actress in a Television Series in the 48th Golden Bell Awards for her role in the romance series An Innocent Mistake (2012). She also starred in the lesbian-themed romance series Fragrance of the First Flower (2021–2024), and won Best Leading Actress in a Miniseries in the 57th Golden Bell Awards with her performance in the first season.

== Early life ==
Lin was born on 22 May 1990. Her parents divorced when she was ten years old. To support Lin and her sister, her mother worked two jobs as an accountant and market hawker, prompting Lin to start working at a night market and restaurants to alleviate her mother's financial burdens. Lin changed schools six times after her parents' divorce, citing her desire for attention as the reason. During junior high school, she became involved with gangs and spent most of her time in billiard halls and comic book stores. She often skipped classes in high school to work and eventually suspended her studies in the sophomore year. She was discovered by a talent scout at the age of 16, and she accepted the offer due to the high salary. She appeared on the variety program Guess in 2006, followed by serving as a recurring host on Blackie's Teenage Club starting that same year. In 2008, Lin gained public recognition for her advertisements for Kymco and her appearance in Mayday's music video for "Suddenly I Miss You".

== Career ==
In 2010, Lin made her acting debut in Hsiao Ya-chuan's drama film Taipei Exchanges, starring alongside Gwei Lun-mei. She described the experience as her motivation to enter showbiz, stating she was "fascinated" by the passion of the cast and crew. That same year, she landed a recurring role in the PTS romance series Gloomy Salad Days directed by Zero Chau, and secured leading roles in the sports film Jump Ashin! and the crime film The Killer Who Never Kills the following year. In 2012, Lin starred alongside Wang Shih-hsien and Mo Tzu-yi in the romance series An Innocent Mistake, which earned her a nomination for Best Leading Actress in a Television Series in the 48th Golden Bell Awards.

In 2014, Lin played the female lead in the drama film Anywhere Somewhere Nowhere, and appeared as the best friend of Ella Chen's character in the television series The Lying Game. She then starred in Penguins at North Pole, Taiwan's first homosexual family comedy, as a woman romantically involved with another protagonist played by Nikki Hsieh. The same year, she also made cameo appearances in Apple in Your Eye, a TTV series and the latest project of An Innocent Mistake's writer Mag Hsu, as lead actress Amber An's high school classmate, as well as a news anchorwoman in the French sci-fi film Lucy directed by Luc Besson. In 2015, Lin starred in the romance series Pisces. She came out as bisexual in the same year, and later revealed in an interview with TVBS that the decision led to her losing several film role offers. She took a hiatus from acting the following year due to pregnancy and returned in 2017, and starred in the Chinese-Hong Kong romance film A Nail Clipper Romance that was released in the same year.

In 2018, Lin portrayed Alice, the girlfriend of Sam Yang's character, in the drama film Killed by Rock and Roll. Han Cheung of Taipei Times praised her performance as "pretty solid" and lamented her character's lack of screen time. She also starred in the drama film Tomorrow's Star alongside Lara Veronin that same year. In 2021, Lin landed a lead role as Yi-ming, a married woman who reunites with a former romantic interest played by Lyan Cheng, in the lesbian-themed romance series Fragrance of the First Flower. She won Best Leading Actress in a Miniseries or Television Film in the 57th Golden Bell Awards with the role, and reprised it in the second season released in 2024. Lin also made a voice cameo alongside Amber An, Ariel Lin, and Rainie Yang as Wu Kang-ren's character's ex-girlfriends in Mag Hsu's romance film I Missed You that same year. She also played contract assassin Cheng Feng in the second and third seasons of her partner Lin Li-shu's legal drama series Best Interest, and made a cameo appearance with her son in the series finale of the 2024 drama Imperfect Us.

== Personal life ==
Lin came out as bisexual in 2015. She had been dating both males and females since junior high school. In November 2016, Lin announced that she had given birth to a son in September with her boyfriend and film director Lin Li-shu, after five years of dating. The partners raised their son together and lived in Hualien County, but they did not marry, with Lin describing them as in an open relationship and stating that they had no plans for marriage. In August 2023, Lin published her autobiography We All Have the Ability to Experience Freedom.

== Filmography ==
=== Film ===
Year	Title	Role	Notes/Ref.
2010	Taipei Exchanges	Joise (薔兒)	
2011	Jump Ashin!	#599	
2011	The Killer Who Never Kills	Wu Hsiao-li (吳小莉)	
2011	10+10	The Customer	Segment: Lane 256
2014	Anywhere Somewhere Nowhere	Little Sun (小太陽)	
2014	Lucy	News anchor	Cameo
2017	A Nail Clipper Romance	Lulu	
2018	Killed by Rock and Roll	Alice (愛莉絲)	
2018	Tomorrow's Star	Seren (濏媛)	
2021	I Missed You	Nan Chih-yang's ex-girlfriend	Voice cameo

=== Television ===
Year	Title	Role	Notes/Ref.
2010	Gloomy Salad Days	Ni Ke (妮可)	Recurring role
2012	An Innocent Mistake	Chung Man-ching (鍾曼青)	Main role
2014	The Lying Game	Zhou Yi (周宜)	Recurring role
2014	Penguins at North Pole	Temu (鐵木)	Main role; television film
2014	Apple in Your Eye	Hsiao Yun (小芸)	Cameo
2015	Pisces	Yu Miao-miao (于淼淼)	Main role
2021–2024	Fragrance of the First Flower	Yi-ming (江怡敏)	Main role (season 1–2)
2023	Best Interest	Cheng Feng (程楓)	Recurring role (season 2–3)
2024	Imperfect Us	A mother	Cameo

== Awards and nominations ==
Year	Award	Category	Work	Result	Ref.
2013	48th Golden Bell Awards	Best Leading Actress in a Television Series	An Innocent Mistake	Nominated	
2022	57th Golden Bell Awards	Best Leading Actress in a Miniseries or Television Film	Fragrance of the First Flower	Won	
