= Jump Ashin! =

- Chinese: 翻滾吧！阿信
- Hanyu Pinyin: fangun ba axin
- Directed by: Yu-Hsien Lin
- Written by: Kuo-Kuang Wang; Li-Wen Wang; Yu-Hsien Lin
- Produced by: Lieh Lee; Roger Huang; Tien-Tsung Ma; Hung-Chieh Lin
- Starring: Eddie Peng; Lawrence Ko; Zaizai Lin
- Cinematography: Shao-Yu Hsia
- Edited by: Ching-Sung Liao; Hsiao-Tung Chen
- Music by: Owen Wang
- Distributed by: Warner Bros. (F.E.) Inc. Taiwan Branch (USA)
- Release dates: 12 August 2011 (Taiwan); 24 November 2011 (Hong Kong); 9 December 2011 (China); 19 April 2012 (South Korea)
- Running time: 127
- Country: Taiwan
- Language: Mandarin

Jump Ashin! is a Taiwanese film directed by Lin Yu-Hsien and stars Eddie Peng, Lawrence Ko, and Zaizai Lin. It is based on the true story of a gymnastics coach, Yu-Shin Lin, who is Lin Yu-Hsien’s brother, about his rebellious youth and the difficult comeback journey to pursue his dream as a gymnast. The film is a follow-up of Lin Yu-Hsien’s documentary Jump! Boys (2004) about the gymnastics team his brother coached in an elementary school in Yilan.

== Plot ==
Ashin, a young man from Yilan in northern Taiwan, was a member of the school gymnastics team. He was talented and his coach had high hopes that he would become a great gymnast in the future. Knowing her son is slightly handicapped with one leg shorter than the other, Ashin’s mom pulled him out of the gymnastics team without telling him the reason why. Disheartened Ashin stayed home and helped her mom run the fruit shop. He and his best friend Pickle, who was a drug addict, picked up fights here and there on the streets. The brief telephone conversations he had with the operator girl for beeper were his only comfort in life, though he did not know the girl No. 599 in person. Ashin and Pickle soon got themselves in trouble and had to take the freight train to escape to Taipei one night when they knocked down Papaya, the son of the local gang Boss Pine. In Taipei Ashin and Pickle joined the gang led by Kun. Though Ashin would like to go back to Yilan, Pickle was reluctant. The violent death of Pickle on the street let Ashin make up his mind to return to Yilan to pursue his dream as a gymnast, Ashin returned to Yilan and regained his belief in gymnastics. Thanks to the support of his former coach and Boss Pine, who was also a gymnast when he was young, Ashin was forgiven and resumed training.

The film ends with information about and photos of the real Ashin (Lin Yu-Shin). He won the gold medal in the international gymnastics competition held in Taiwan in 1994.

== Cast ==
Character	Actor
Ashin/Lin Yu-Shin	Eddie Peng
Young Ashin	Yu-Chen Lee
Pickle	Lawrence Ko
Ashin's mother	Li-li Pan
Coach Huang	Ching-Ting Hsia
Papaya	Han-Dian Chen
#599 (Pager receptionist)	Zaizai Lin
Pine	Shao-Hua Lung
Hsiao Hsien/Lin Yu-Hsien	Kuan-Yi Lee
Hsiao Shu/Ho Zheng-shu	Jay Ho
Young Hsiao Hsien	Evan Tsai
Ashin's grandfather	Liu Hong

== Production and casting ==
This feature film is a sequel to the documentary Jump! Boys by director Yu-Hsien Lin. The protagonist of this film, Lin Yu-Shin, is the gymnastics teacher who appeared in the documentary. Jump! Boys won many awards, including the Best Documentary award at the 2005 Golden Horse Awards in Taiwan.

The director believed that gymnastics is a sport with a high technical threshold. He had initially considered inviting professional gymnasts to play the lead role. However, actor Eddie Peng was very serious about the role and insisted on performing all the stunts himself.

To execute the numerous gymnastic moves in Jump Ashin!, Eddie Peng underwent eight months of physical training. Before shooting, he had trained in a gymnastics hall for three months, practicing physical training and gymnastic moves for 12 hours a day. Moreover, to shape the physique of a gymnast, Eddie Peng had to follow a strict diet plan given by a nutritionist during training and filming, eating only boiled vegetables and avoiding any oily or salty foods. As a result, he successfully attained the body of a standard athlete.

During the filming, the real-life protagonist of the film's main character "Ashin," Yu-Shin Lin, served as Eddie Peng's gymnastics coach.

Director Yu-Hsien Lin emphasized that the reason why he chose to make the film about his brother is not only because he wanted to tell his brother's personal story, but also because he wanted to inspire the generation that lived through that period. "Many people in our generation have experienced confusion and frustration in their lives, and I hope to show them that if they persist in pursuing their dreams and working hard, they can still create a brighter future for themselves."

Jump Ashin! enlisted the expertise of professional action choreographers from Korea to combine gymnastics movements with the atmosphere of the era, and present a martial arts style reminiscent of 80s Hong Kong action films. The film pays homage to Jackie Chan's playful and improvisational use of props during fight scenes.

== Awards ==
As the opening film of the 2011 Taipei Film Festival, Jump Ashin! won the Media Recommendation Award and the Audience Choice Award. Actor Lawrence Ko won the Best Supporting Actor Award of the festival for his role as "Pickle".

Jump Ashin! was nominated for Best Actor, Best Supporting Actor, Best Original Screenplay, and Best Original Film Song at the 48th Golden Horse Awards. The film's theme song ultimately won the Best Original Film Song Award.

In addition, supporting actor Lawrence Ko won Best Supporting Actor at the 6th Asian Film Awards.

At the 12th Chinese Film Media Awards, Eddie Peng won the Audience's Most Anticipated Male Actor award for his performance in the film.

The film was nominated for Best Chinese-language Feature Film at The 11th Changchun Film Festival in 2012.

== Music ==
Three original film Songs by Luantan Ascent (Chinese: 乱彈阿翔), Wanmei Luodi (Chinese: 完美落地; lit. 'perfect landing'), Jiao Mama (Chinese: 叫媽媽; lit. 'go find your mom') and Fangun ba (Chinese: 翻滾吧; lit. 'jump') released by Chijiaobula (Chinese: 赤腳不辣).

Soundtracks are Aiwo Haoma (Chinese: 愛我好嗎; lit. 'can you love me') released by Rock Records Co., Ltd, Yichang Youxi Yichang Meng (Chinese: 一場遊戲一場夢; lit. 'one game one dream') released by Warner Music Taiwan Ltd., and Zhengjiu Diqiu (Chinese: 拯救地球; lit. 'save the earth') released by Rock Records Co., Ltd.
