= Bad Habits (Ella album) =

- Bad Habits album cover

Studio album by Ella Chen
- Released: 31 March 2024 (Digital); 1 April 2024
- Recorded: 2023–2024
- Genre: Mandopop
- Length: 35:46
- Language: Mandarin
- Label: EHalo Entertainment
- Producers: Howe Chen, Shivia Lee

Ella Chen chronology
Ella Show Entertainment Unlimited Company (2020)	Bad Habits (2024)

Singles from Bad Habits
- 1. "Wishes (願望清單)" Released: December 15, 2023; 2. "The Moon (南方的月亮)" Released: January 22, 2024; 3. "Bad Habits" Released: March 8, 2024

Bad Habits is the second solo studio album by Ella Chen Chia-hwa, a member of the famous Taiwanese girl group S.H.E. It was available for pre-order on February 29, 2024, and officially released on April 1, 2024. This is her second studio album, released nine years after her previous album "Why Not".

The track, "The Moon", was ranked 83rd on Hit Fm's Top 100 Singles of 2024.

== Background and release ==
After nine years in the making, Ella Chen released her second solo studio album, Bad Habits. Over this period, Chen experienced significant personal growth and achieved remarkable career milestones, including her sold-out large-scale concert The Ella Show, winning the championship in the reality competition Ride the Wind 2023, and starring in the film Listen Before You Sing, which grossed NT$80 million at the box office. Despite her success in other fields, Chen remained dedicated to her passion for music. Through Bad Habits, she shares her reflections on life, exploring various aspects of the human experience across ten tracks.

The album's title, Bad Habits, is intended to convey the complex and multifaceted nature of things. To reflect a sense of inclusivity, the album cover's visual design features a massive fabric backdrop alongside a large-scale installation art piece titled "King Kong Rhino." Weighing 300 kilograms, the rhinoceros sculpture was entirely handcrafted from hundreds of stainless steel plates, incorporating geometric cuts and industrial rivets. The imagery of soft fabric juxtaposed with the rigid steel rhinoceros combines strength and beauty, designed to symbolize unwavering determination.

For the track "Wish" (Chinese: 願望清單), Chen utilizes a nuanced vocal performance that highlights her narrative approach to singing. Through an understated delivery, the song conveys themes of deep-seated longing and regret, creating a cinematic atmosphere. The accompanying music video stars actor Jerry Yan. Composed by Lala Hsu, "Revenge" (Chinese: 復仇大任) blends orchestral elements with hip-hop rhythms. To create a distinctive sound, the track incorporates a whispery vocal delivery while maintaining a rhythmic bounce, highlighting Chen's rhythmic control and hip-hop influences. "The Moon" (Chinese: 南方的月亮) explores the anxiety and uncertainty of leaving home to pursue one's dreams, conveying themes of familial love and longing. Arranged by Huang Chung-yueh, the track utilizes an acoustic guitar and a trombone to evoke a sense of nostalgia, emphasizing the lyrical concept of home as a permanent sanctuary. The accompanying music video stars actress Ivy Chen. The arrangement of the title track "Bad Habits" incorporates subtle retro instrumentation and rhythms. Chen's vocal delivery balances strength and softness, complementing the song's diverse stylistic elements. "Don't Stay" (Chinese: 別再留下) is a soul-infused urban ballad that explores the dynamics of modern-day relationships; its accompanying music video features actors Cheryl Yang and Tony Yang. "Nothing" (Chinese: 廢) is an electropop track characterized by African-inspired rhythms and vibrant elements. Chen interprets the dance song through melodic rap, showcasing her versatile vocal tones. The track was written, composed, and produced by Howe Chen, the guitarist of the band Buddha Jump.

== Track listing ==
No.	Title	Lyrics	Music	Arrangement	Length
1.	"Bad Habits"	Alvin Lai, Chih Jen (任遲)	Andreas Öhrn, Peter Boström, Alessandra Günthardt	Andreas Öhrn/Peter Boström, Alessandra Günthardt, Howe Chen	2:41
2.	"Revenge" (復仇大任)	David Ke (葛大為)	LaLa Hsu	Jie Lin (林頡)	2:26
3.	"Minimalism" (小簡單)	Johnny Yao (姚書寰)	Johnny Yao, William Chen (陳鈺羲)	Xiao-young (鐘承洋)	4:08
4.	"Don't Stay" (別再留下)	Ho Yu-shen (何宇勝)	B.K Lin	Dato Chang (張晁毓)	4:18
5.	"Comedian" (諧星)	David Ke	JerryC, PoLin (柏霖)	Fanda Yuan (袁偉翔)	4:02
6.	"Nothing" (廢)	Howe Chen (陳君豪), David Ke	Howe Chen	Howe Chen	3:34
7.	"Hot Like Chili"	Ho Yu-shen	Jay Hong, Gionata Carraciolo, Boran	Jay Hong, Gionata Carraciolo, Boran, Howe Chen	3:22
8.	"The Moon" (南方的月亮)	He Chi-hung (何啟弘)	Jie Lin	Ray Huang (黃中岳)	3:23
9.	"Wishes" (願望清單)	David Ke	Salsa Chen (陳小霞)	Jie Lin	3:55
10.	"Blessed" (祝你)	David Ke	Evan Yo	Steven Lai (賴暐哲)	3:57
Total length:					35:46

== Music videos ==
Title	Director	Release date	Channel	Notes
Bad Habits	EthanYIJAN (一盞)	March 8, 2024	Ella Chen's Official Channel	-
Don't Stay (別再留下)	Remii Huang (黃婕妤)	April 8, 2024	Ella Chen's Official Channel	Featuring Cheryl Yang, Tony Yang
Nothing (廢)	Bill Chia (比爾賈)	August 19, 2024	Ella Chen's Official Channel	-
Hot Like Chili	DaMOVE (大目)	June 21, 2024	Ella Chen's Official Channel	-
The Moon (南方的月亮)	Yin Chen-hao	January 22, 2024	Ella Chen's Official Channel	Featuring Ivy Chen, Kelly Ko (柯素雲)
Wishes (願望清單)	Yin Chen-hao	December 27, 2023	Ella Chen's Official Channel	Featuring Jerry Yan

== Concerts ==
Title	Date	City	Location	Notes
Ella Chen “Bad Habits” Album Concerts	April 13, 2024	Taipei City, Taiwan	Legacy Taipei	Free entry with ticket
Ella Chen “Bad Habits” Album Concerts	May 17, 2024	Shenzhen, China	So Fun Live	
Ella Chen “Bad Habits” Album Concerts	June 9, 2024	Shanghai, China	PHASE LIVE HOUSE	
Ella Chen “Bad Habits” Album Concerts	September 7, 2024	Wuhan, China	IN TIME LIVE	

== Awards ==
- 2025 KKBOX Music Awards
  - Top 100 Artists of the Year — Ella Chen "Don't Stay"
- 2025 Hito Music Awards
  - Most Popular Female Singer Award — Ella Chen "Bad Habits"
