= My Island Home (Kaira Gong song) =

"My Island Home 幸福的圖形"

Single by Kaira Gong
- Released: July 2006
- Recorded: 2006
- Length: 3:04
- Label: Eq music, Universal Music
- Songwriter: Joshua Wan

Official National Day Parade theme song singles chronology
"Reach Out For The Skies" (2005)	"My Island Home 幸福的圖形" (2006)	"There's No Place I'd Rather Be" (2007)

My Island Home (Chinese: 幸福的圖形; pinyin: Xìng Fú Dè Tú Xíng）is a song sung by Singaporean (Taiwan based) singer, Kaira Gong. The song is the official theme music to the 2006 national day parade. The song is one of the few NDP theme songs to not mention Singapore's name in it.

== Music video ==
The promotional short film which is directed by Gloria Chee, shows Kaira riding in a largely obscured pickup truck from dawn till dusk as she rides around Singapore. Various scenes of Singaporean life plays throughout the video. The latter ends up at National Stadium where the song piece concludes. The film ends with Kaira smiling at the camera and later a bokeh of lights follows as the screen fades to black.

== See also ==
- National Day Parade
- Music of Singapore
