= Ying Wei-min =

Taiwanese singer and actor

- 應蔚民
- Born: 24 October 1970 (age 55); Songshan, Taipei, Taiwan
- Occupations: Actor, singer

Ying Wei-min (Chinese: 應蔚民; pinyin: Yīng Wèimín; Pe̍h-ōe-jī: Eng Ùi-bîn; born 24 October 1970) is a Taiwanese actor and singer.

He is the lead singer of an indie nakasi rock band, The Clippers, which he founded in 1995. The band began with an emphasis on noise music, and shifted in style throughout the years. On stage, Ying is known by a diminutive of his surname, to which he usually affixes the name of his band. In 1998, Ying hosted a radio program, Psychological Collapse of Xiao Ying on Big Tree Radio FM 90.5. The show featured an eclectic array of sound mixed within a talk show format. Tsai Hai-en of the LTK Commune helped develop the show, which was taken off the air due to its inappropriate content. Ying has appeared as a stage actor, although he is best known as an actor for his role in Cape No. 7, and numerous cameos, including on David Loman.

== Filmography ==
- Cape No. 7 (2008)
- My Queen (2009)
- In Time with You (2011)
- Night Market Hero (2011)
- Bad Girls (2012)
- Miss Rose (2012)
- Once Upon a Love (2012)
- David Loman (2013)
- Angel 'N' Devil (2014)
- The Missing Piece (2015)
- Someone Like You (2015)
- 52Hz, I Love You (2017)
- The Bold, the Corrupt, and the Beautiful (2017)
- Turn Around (2017)
- The Village of No Return (2017)
- Miss Shampoo (2023)
