= Wen Chen-ling =

Taiwanese actress and television host

- 温貞菱
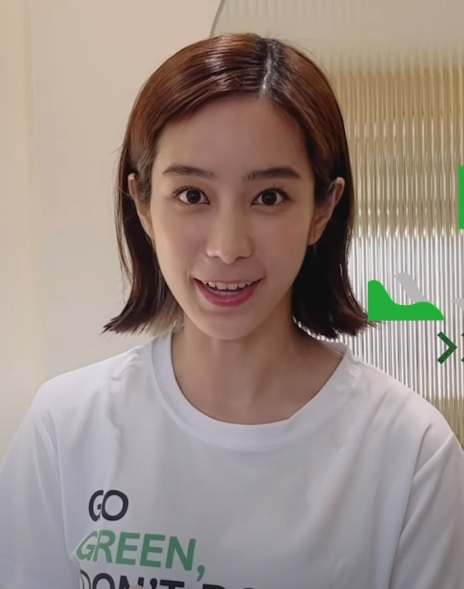
- Wen in May 2022
- Born: October 23, 1992 (age 33); Taiwan
- Other names: Wen Zhenling; Jenny Wen
- Occupations: Actress; television host
- Years active: 2010–present

Chinese name
- Traditional Chinese: 温貞菱
- Simplified Chinese: 温贞菱
- Hanyu Pinyin: Wēn Zhēnlíng

Wen Chen-ling (Chinese: 温貞菱; born October 23, 1992) is a Taiwanese actress and television host.

== Life and career ==
Wen's mother is Chinese Filipino. Her father is of Japanese and Han Chinese descent.

Wen made her acting debut in television series The Kite Soaring when she was 16. She won the Golden Bell Award for Best Supporting Actress in a Miniseries or Television Film in 2014 and Best Actress in a Miniseries or Television Film award in 2017.

She has been in a relationship with actor River Huang since 2014.

== Filmography ==
=== Television series ===
Year	English title	Original title	Role	Notes
2010	The Kite Soaring	牽紙鷂的手	Lin Chia-hsin (Little Star)	
2010	Gloomy Salad Days	死神少女	Hsiao-chu	
2011	Ex-boyfriend	前男友	Chun-chiao (young)	
2012	In Between	半熟戀人	Annie	
2012	The Smiling Starlight	微笑星光	Liu Chia-wen	
2014	Angel 'n' Devil	終極惡女	Cat	Special appearance
2015	Long Day's Journey into Light	出境事務所	Hsuan-lan	
2015	A Touch of Green	一把青	Shao Mo-ting	
2016	In Love – Xiao Wei	滾石愛情故事-小薇	Fang Ching-wei	
2017	My Dear Boy	我的男孩	Pan Yen-ting	
2018	The Coming Through	奇蹟的女兒	Chen Yu-juan	
2019	The Teenage Psychic 2	通靈少女2	Zhan Xiao-tong	
2019	The Mirror	鏡子森林	Lee An-an	
2021	The Magician on the Skywalk	天橋上的魔術師	Naoko	Cameo
2021	Seqalu: Formosa 1867	斯卡羅	Tiap-moe	
2022	Shards of Her	她和她的她	Yang Jia Ying	
2022	On Marriage	你的婚姻不是你的婚姻		

=== Film ===
Year	English title	Original title	Role	Notes
2011	Hotel Black Cat	黑貓大旅社	Fang Chiao-chiao	
2011	Together	甜·祕密	Tien-tien	
2013	Faithball	天后之戰	Kiki	
2014	Dawn / Spring	曉之春	Lu Chia -ling	Television
2014	Partners in Crime	共犯	Chu Ching-yi	
2014	Exit	迴光奏鳴曲	Ling-tzu's daughter	
2014	Meet Myself	抬頭遇見自己	Voice	Animated short
2015	The Kids	小孩	Chia-chia	Television
2015	Battle Up!	舞鬥	Yu Hsiao-ching	
2016	Love in Vain	獨一無二	Swallow	
2017	The Absurd Notes	離譜音符	Narrator	Short film
2017	Please Come Home	迷語	The lost girl	Short film
2017	The Last Verse	最後的詩句	Li Hsiao-ping	Television
2017	The Bold, the Corrupt, and the Beautiful	血觀音	Lin Pien-pien	
2018	Father to Son	在一個死亡之後	Kuo Yu-chin (young)	
2019	The 9th Precinct	第九分局	Xiao Xue	
2019	A Sun	陽光普照	Kuo Hsiao-zhen	
2021	Leave Me Alone	不想一個人	Jin Sha	

=== Variety and reality show ===
Year	English title	Original title	Notes
2021	Three Piglets 2	阮三个：餐車環島發大財2	Host
2021	Hot Door Night	綜藝大熱門	Guest host
2022	Three Piglets 3	阮三个3	Host

=== Music video appearances ===
Year	Artist	Song title
2014	Rachel Liang	"Everytime I Fall In Love"
2014	Rene Liu	"Halfway"
2015	Lin Xin-yang	"Jealousy"
2015	Amit	"Insomnia"
2016	Penny Tai	"Do Not Disturb"
2017	Peter Pan	"Late Night Train"
2017	Peter Pan	"Nine Years"
2017	Lo Ta-yu	"Guan Yin Shan"
2017	Ma-te Lin	"Please Come Home"
2018	Enno Cheng	"Jade"
2019	Wayne's So Sad	"Talk About Hope"
2019	Joker Xue	"Puppet"
2020	William Wei	"Don't Tell"
2020	William Wei	"How About This"
2020	Yo Lee	"Until I Met You"
2021	Kenny Khoo	"Eclipse"
2021	Chao Chuan	"No Turning Back"
2021	Arrow Wei	"Heart of Stone"

== Awards and nominations ==
Year	Award	Category	Nominated work	Result
2014	49th Golden Bell Awards	Best Supporting Actress in a Miniseries or Television Film	Dawn / Spring	Won
2015	50th Golden Bell Awards	Best Actress in a Miniseries or Television Film	The Kids	Nominated
2017	52nd Golden Bell Awards	Best Actress in a Miniseries or Television Film	The Last Verse	Won
2019	56th Golden Horse Awards	Best Supporting Actress	A Sun	Nominated
2021	58th Golden Horse Awards	Best Supporting Actress	Leave Me Alone	Nominated
2022	57th Golden Bell Awards	Best Host in a Reality or Game Show	Three Piglets 3	Won
