= The Kids (film) =

- Film poster
- 小孩
- Directed by: Sunny Yu
- Written by: Sunny Yu
- Produced by: Chang Chao-cheng
- Starring: Wu Chien-ho; Wen Chen-ling
- Cinematography: Pei Chi-wei
- Edited by: Arvin Chen
- Music by: Wen Hsu
- Production companies: Epic Entertainment; Wei Wu Films
- Release date: July 16, 2015 (Taipei Film Festival)
- Running time: 90 minutes
- Country: Taiwan
- Language: Mandarin

The Kids (Chinese: 小孩) is a 2015 Taiwanese drama film written and directed by Sunny Yu. It stars Wu Chien-ho and Wen Chen-ling as teenage parents who must find a way to provide for their baby.

== Plot ==
Sixteen-year-old Bao-li falls in love with older student Jia-jia. After they begin dating, Jia-jia becomes pregnant and gives birth to a child for whom they can not afford to provide. Though they at first are able to survive with the help of friends and family, Bao-li turns to robbery when his mother gambles away their savings.

== Cast ==
- Wu Chien-ho as Bao-li
- Wen Chen-ling as Jia-jia
- Yang Chi as Bao-li's mother
- Bi Zhi Gang as Uncle Liu
- Shirley Chien as Aunty Liu
- Kao Meng Chieh
- May Hong as A-qin
- Lawrence Ko as Zhe-wei
- Yang Jing as Zhang-qing
- Roger Huang as Jia-jia's father

== Production ==
The film was based on true events. Writer-director Sunny Yu says that she made to film to understand how a young father could be pressured into robbing people to support his family.

== Release ==
The international premiere was at the Tokyo International Film Festival, where it competed in the Asian Future competition.

== Reception ==
Richard Kuipers of Variety called it "an engaging and convincing drama" with good acting, directing, and scoring.

Awards
Organization	Award	Awardee	Result	Ref
Golden Bell Awards	Best Miniseries or Television Film		Nominated	
Golden Bell Awards	Best Actress in a Miniseries or Television Film	Wen Chen Ling	Nominated	
Golden Bell Awards	Best Directing for a Mini-series/TV movie	Sunny Yu	Nominated	
Golden Bell Awards	Best Writing for a Mini-series/TV movie	Sunny Yu	Nominated	
Hawaii International Film Festival	NETPAC Award	Sunny Yu	Won	
