= K-Design Award =

- Description: International design contest focused on commercial potential and innovative ideas
- Country: South Korea
- Presented by: DESIGNSORI

K-Design Award is an international design contest exhibit held by ‘DESIGNSORI’ Korea’s design portal. The contest’s purpose, claiming to support Asia’s 3 major design award, leaving morphological simplicity or complexity aside, is to select a nice idea materializing good design, which have the potential to be commercialized. In 2015, Dell Inc. was awarded grand prize while LG Uplus and Phiaton got the gold prize.

== Categories ==
K-Design Award is divided into five big categories: Product Design, Communication Design, Transportation Design, Space Design and Service Design.

== The foreman of a jury ==
Hongik University IDAS Director Ken Nah

== Prize ==
- Grand Prize

Is awarded to the one best work. It is the highest prize in K-Design Award.

- Gold Prize

1% who is recognized the highest quality from international judging committee can be awarded.

- Winner

Place emphasis on real market value, and select 10% as prize-winning work which got good evaluation from experts of current post with international sight.

== Yearbook ==
All the prize-winning work and profiles of the judging committees over the years is included. Yearbook K-Book sale

== Ceremony ==
Design conference and awards ceremony is held gathering winners from all over the world and part of judging committee. In 2005, total 1038 works were entered from 26 countries over the world and competed, and awards ceremony was held in Dongdaemun Design Plaza(DDP) designed by ZahaHadid.
