= Taipei Exchanges =

- Taiwan Poster
- Directed by: Hsiao Ya-chuan
- Written by: Hsiao Ya-chuan
- Produced by: Hou Hsiao-hsien
- Starring: Gwei Lun-mei; Zaizai Lin; Chang Han
- Cinematography: Lin Tse-chung
- Edited by: Tao Chu-Chun
- Music by: Summer Lei; Hou Zhi-jian
- Distributed by: Atom Cinema
- Release date: 14 May 2010
- Running time: 82 minutes
- Country: Taiwan
- Language: Mandarin

Taipei Exchanges (Chinese: 第36個故事; pinyin: Dì 36 gè gùshì) is a 2010 Taiwanese comedy film directed by Hsiao Ya-chuan and starring Gwei Lun-mei and Zaizai Lin.

== Plot ==
Doris always wanted to have her own coffee-house. With the help of her sister, Joise, she opened "Doris's Cafe". After the first day of business, however, there are few customers for the coffee house and the coffee house becomes cluttered with many useless gifts brought by friends and former colleagues. Later, when customers start to ask about purchasing some of the items, Joise suggested a bartering system for the store.

Business goes up as people linger to decide what to exchange. Later, customers began to share their personal stories with Doris in the coffee house as well.

== Cast ==
- Gwei Lun-mei as Doris, the owner of the newly opened cafe.
- Zaizai Lin as Joise, sister of Doris who works in the cafe.
- Chang Han as Chun-Ching, a soap collector who has collected 35 bars of soap. Each bar of soap has a story behind it.
- Kousuke Atari as a Japanese Singer

== Production ==
The film was invested in part by Taipei tourism bureau.

Director Hsiao Ya-chuan said that he got inspiration for Doris's character when he visited a coffee shop in Shanghai, where he witnessed a French girl with short hair devoting "her full attention to making desserts at the counter". Hsiao also said that he wanted to deliver the idea of "making exchanges without using money" because he felt that "if we value an item with only one fixed standard [ie: money], the item will lose its appeal very soon.".

Doris’ Coffee Shop, the coffee shop featured in the film, was built completely from scratch in an old apartment on Fujin Street in Taipei. It later became a real coffee shop after the shooting of the film.

== Reception ==
The Taipei Times described the film as a "surprisingly sweet, romantic portrait of a Taipei where capitalism is superseded by a barter economy". The reviewer praised the art, saying that the "fairy-tale feel [of the film] is charmingly enhanced by artist Wu Meng-yun’s child-like illustrated art, and the "warm, comforting [music] score". However, it added that towards "80%" of the film, "Hsiao stretches his already thin material a bit too much and loses the momentum he would have needed to make a serious statement." It also criticized the characters of the film, saying that they "seem to live exclusively in delightful vignettes that are inspired by the real world but not truly rooted in it.".

Film Business Asia said that "Hsiao's second feature is technically smooth and never boring to watch. But it's as wispy as the froth from a cappuccino machine." and rated the film 5 out of 10. Time Out gave the film a score of 2 out of 5, describing it as "A sickly sweet capitalist allegory that severely lacks substance". However, it added that the film "gets extra marks for the production design and ultra-clean shooting style".

Taipei Exchanges grossed a total of US$17,773 at the Singaporean box office.
