= Reaching for the Stars (soundtrack) =

Reaching for the Stars Original Soundtrack
- Reaching for the Stars Original Soundtrack cover

Soundtrack album 真命天女 電視原聲帶 by Various Artists
- Released: 28 September 2005
- Genre: Mandopop
- Language: Mandarin
- Label: HIM International Music

Reaching for the Stars Original Soundtrack (simplified Chinese: 真命天女 电视原声带; traditional Chinese: 真命天女 電視原聲帶; pinyin: Zhēn Mìng Tiān Nǚ Diànshì Yuánshēngdài) is the soundtrack for the 2005 Taiwanese drama, Reaching For The Stars, starring Selina Ren, Hebe Tian and Ella Chen of S.H.E. It was released on 28 September 2005 by HIM International Music with a bonus DVD containing four music videos, behind-the-scene footage and a photobook.

The track "星光" (Star Light) was nominated for Top 10 Gold Songs at the Hong Kong TVB8 Awards, presented by television station TVB8, in 2005.

== Track listing ==
1. "星光" (Star Light) - S.H.E
2. "再一次擁有" (To Have It Once Again) - Kaira Gong
3. "我比想像中愛你" (Love You More Than You Think) - J.S
4. "我給你幸福" (I Give You Happiness) - Power Station
5. "只是當時" (Only Then) - Ella Chen
6. "摩天輪" (Ferris Wheel) - Hebe Tien
7. "管不著" (Can't Worry) - Selina Ren
8. "星光 流光飛舞版 - 演奏曲" (Star Light - Lights & Dance Version) - instrumental
9. "再一次擁有 激情擁抱版 - 演奏曲" (To Have It Once Again - Emotional Embrace Version) - instrumental
10. "星光 夜空燦爛版 - 演奏曲" (Star Light - Night Glitter Version) - instrumental
11. "再一次擁有 怦然心動版 - 演奏曲" (To Have It Once Again - Eager, Moving Version) - instrumental
12. "只是當時 演奏版" (Only Then) - instrumental
13. "摩天輪 演奏版" (Ferris Wheel) - instrumental
14. "管不著 演奏版" (Can't Worry) - instrumental

== Bonus DVD ==
1. "星光" (Star Light) MV
2. "管不著" (Can't Worry) MV
3. "摩天輪" (Ferris Wheel) MV
4. "只是當時" (Only Then) MV
5. "星光" (Star Light) MV Behind-the-scene
6. "管不著" (Can't Worry) MV Behind-the-scene
7. "摩天輪" (Ferris Wheel) MV Behind-the-scene
8. "只是當時" (Only Then) MV Behind-the-scene
9. Reaching for the Stars Photobook
