= Summer Lei =

Taiwanese singer-songwriter

Lei Kwang-hsia
- 雷光夏
- Born: August 15, 1968 (age 58)
- Other name: Summer Lei
- Occupations: Singer, Voiceover Artist
- Father: Lay Hsiang

Lei Kwang-hsia (Summer Lei, Chinese: 雷光夏); 15 August 1968) is a musician.

She has released several solo albums, including "I am Lei Kwang-hsia" (Mandarin: 我是雷光夏), "Cheeks to the Moon" (Mandarin: 臉頰貼緊月球), "Secret Words Of Time" (Mandarin: 時間的密語), "Fad Away 2003" (Mandarin: 2003逝), and "the Light of Darkness" (黑暗之光).

In late December 2015, Lei composed "Travel" for the Taipei MRT Red Line (Tamsui-Xinyi), and created entrance music for each of the four high-capacity routes of the Taipei Metro for the third part of the "Taipei Soundscape Monthly Project".

Lei has won the Taiwan Golden Melody Award several times. In 2010, she won the Best Original Song for Movie at the Taiwan Golden Horse Awards for the movie "Taipei Exchanges" (Mandarin: 第36個故事), and in 2011, she won the Best Album Producer in the Performance category at the Golden Melody Awards. She has also been a finalist for the Golden Horse Awards, Golden Melody Awards, and Golden Bell Awards.

== Personal life ==
Summer Lei's father Lay Hsiang (Mandarin: 雷驤; 1939–2024) was also a literary and artistic creator. Lei's father died on 29 May 2024, aged 85.

== Music Works ==
=== Studio albums ===
Album	Release date	Album name	Language	Tracks
1	1995	"I am Lei Kwang-hsia" (我是雷光夏)	Mandarin	1. 情節; 2. 逝 3. 榜外; 4. 媽媽與我; 5. 獵小海豹; 6. 波斯; 7. 冬天不相干的故事; 8. 入山
2	1999	Cheek Pressed to the Moon (臉頰貼緊月球)	Mandarin	1. 臉頰貼緊月球; 2. 老夏天; 3. 敗帝國; 4. 看不見的吹奏者; 5. 原諒; 6. 貿易風; 7. 花園; 8. 海上花; 9. 消失的奏鳴曲; 10. 小島漫遊; 11. 壯麗的你
2	2013	Cheek Pressed to the Moon (臉頰貼緊月球), 180 grams of German vinyl	Mandarin	1. 臉頰貼緊月球; 2. 老夏天; 3. 敗帝國; 4. 看不見的吹奏者; 5. 原諒; 6. 貿易風; 7. 花園; 8. 海上花; 9. 消失的奏鳴曲; 10. 小島漫遊; 11. 壯麗的你
3	2003	"Fad Away 2003" (2003逝)	Mandarin	1. 逝 2. 情節; 3. 冬天不相干的故事; 4. 榜外; 5. 壯麗的你; 6. 媽媽與我; 7. 波斯; 8. 入山; 9. 生日快樂; 10. 逝(1985歲珍貴歷史錄音)
4	2003	"Secret Words Of Time" (時間的密語)	Mandarin	1. 你靜靜聽; 2. ach/uri caine:goldberg variation aria 1; 3. 昨天晚上我夢見你; 4. 搖籃曲; 5. Uri Caine/Bach：Goldberg Variation-Aria 1; 6. 駛向都市邊緣的電車; 7. 搖籃曲II; 8. 臉頰貼緊月球(全新故事版); 9. ach/uri caine:goldberg variation aria 2; 10. 時間的密語; 11. ach/uri caine:goldberg variation aria 3
5	2006	"The Light of Darkness" (黑暗之光)	Mandarin	1. 我的80年代; 2. 黑暗之光; 3. La Paloma (folk); 4. 造字的人; 5. 別人的天使; 6. New Dreams; 7. 清晨旅行; 8. 未來女孩; 9. 發光房子; 10. 黑暗之光 (Version 2)
5	2007	"The Light of Darkness" (黑暗之光), Shadow of Light Special Edition CD + DVD	Mandarin	CD: 1. 我的80年代; 2. 黑暗之光; 3. La Paloma (folk); 4. 造字的人; 5. 別人的天使; 6. New Dreams; 7. 清晨旅行; 8. 未來女孩; 9. 發光房子; 10. 黑暗之光 (Version 2); DVD: 1. 我的80年代 蕭雅全; 2. 黑暗之光 HENDRIK HOELZEMANN; 3. 造字的人 王登鈺; 4. 臉頰貼緊月球 黃室淨; 5. 原諒 張作驥
5	2013	The Light of Darkness" (黑暗之光), Vinyl	Mandarin	1. 我的80年代; 2. 黑暗之光; 3. La Paloma (folk); 4. 造字的人; 5. 別人的天使; 6. New Dreams; 7. 清晨旅行; 8. 未來女孩; 9. 發光房子; 10. 黑暗之光 (Version 2)
6	2010	"Her changes" (她的改變), "Taipei Exchanges" (第36個故事) Movie Soundtrack	Mandarin	1. 她的改變; 2. 朵兒咖啡館(序曲) Daughter's Cafe; 3. 只是還沒找到彼此而已 the missing part 4. 第36個故事 (弦樂珍藏版); 5. 心理價值之一 inner valueI; 6. 心理價值之二 inner value II; 7. 騷動; 8. 流動的故事 in between seasons 9. 這就是城市 smile 10. 朵兒與薔兒之一 Doris and Josie I 11. 朵兒與薔兒之二 Doris and Josie II; 12. 第36個故事(電影抒情版) Taipei Exchanges(bonus track); 13. 交換(尾曲) exchanges 14. 故鄉 homeland
7	2015	Sounds Not to Forget (不想忘記的聲音)	Mandarin	1. 不想忘記的聲音; 2. 在世界的每個早晨; 3. 遠方的鼓聲; 4. 遠方有雨; 5. 公路電影; 6. 那些時代的風景; 7. 藍圖; 8. 明朗俱樂部; 9. Into the Deep; 10. 寫給雨天的歌; 11. 有小狗的房子; 12. Thank You

=== Soundtracks ===
- 1997, "Goodbye South, Goodbye" (Mandarin: 南國再見，南國) movie theme song, "Flowers of Shanghai" (Mandarin: 海上花) - finalist for Best Lyricist at the 9th Golden Melody Awards
- 1999 Documentary on "The Writer's Body" (Mandarin: 作家身影) - winner of the 34th Golden Bell Awards for Educational and Cultural Programs)
- 2010 "Taipei Exchanges" (Mandarin: 第36個故事) Movie Theme Song "Taipei Exchanges" - Winner of the Best Music Award at the 12th Taipei Film Awards and the Best Original Movie Song Award at the 47th Golden Horse Awards
- 2014 "Exit" (Mandarin: 迴光奏鳴曲) Movie Soundtrack
- 2018 "Father to Son" (Fan Bao De) Film Score and Theme Song "Deeply Emotionless" - finalist, 55th Golden Horse Awards, Best Original Film Song and Best Original Film Score
- 2019 Detention movie ending song "Bright Day" - winner of Best Original Movie Song at the 56th Golden Horse Awards

== Dubbed works ==
- 2001 Jimmy Liao (Mandarin: 幾米), "Twenty Musical Scenes from the Subway" (Mandarin: 地下鐵的二十個音樂場景) Music Album
- 2014 finalist of the 25th Golden Melody Awards
- 2015 finalist of the 26th Golden Melody Awards

== Hosting Programs ==
- Pink Forest (Mandarin: 粉紅色森林), Philharmonic Radio Taipei (愛樂電台)
- Sound Textile Machine (Mandarin: 聲音紡織機), Philharmonic Radio Taipei (愛樂電台)

== Concerts ==
- September 15, 2019 Taipei International Convention Center "I Met You Last Night" Concert

== Award Record ==
Year	Award	Ceremony Award	Works	Result
1999	The 10th Golden Melody Awards	Best Lyricist Award	Flowers of Shanghai	Nominated
2000	The 11th Golden Melody Awards	Best Lyricist Award	Forgiveness	Won
2000	The 11th Golden Melody Awards	Best Arranger	Cheek Pressed to the Moon	Nominated
2000	The 11th Golden Melody Awards	Album of the Year	Cheek Pressed to the Moon	Nominated
2000	The 11th Golden Melody Awards	Best Music Video	Huang Shijing, Cheek Pressed to the Moon	Nominated
2004	The 39th Golden Bell Awards	Type of Music Program Host Award	Pink Forest Women's Entry Series	Nominated
2007	The 7th Chinese Music Media Awards	Best Mandarin Female Singer	The Light of Darkness	Won
2010	47th Golden Horse Awards	Best Original Movie Song	Taipei Exchanges	Won
2011	22nd Golden Melody Awards	Best Composer in Performance Category	Duo Café (Overture) Taipei Exchanges Movie Soundtrack Album - Her changes	Nominated
2011	22nd Golden Melody Awards	Best Album Producer in Performance Category	Taipei Exchanges Movie Soundtrack Album - Her changes	Won
2011	22nd Golden Melody Awards	Best Album in Performance Category	Taipei Exchanges Movie Soundtrack Album - Her changes	Nominated
2016	5th Abbey Deer Music Awards	Record of the Year	Sounds Not to Forget	Won
2018	20th Taipei Film Awards	Best Music	Father to Son	Won
2018	55th Golden Horse Awards	Best Original Film Music	Father to Son	Nominated
2018	55th Golden Horse Awards	Best Original Movie Song	Father to Son	Nominated
2019	56th Golden Horse Awards	Best Original Movie Song	Bright Day, Detention	Won
