= Bad Girls (2012 film) =

- Bad Girls theatrical poster
- Traditional Chinese: 女孩壞壞
- Simplified Chinese: 女孩坏坏
- Directed by: Seven Wong
- Written by: Charles Tang; Mint Liao; Toki Lu; Chang Ying-min
- Produced by: Jade Lee; Phillip Lee; Tony Yang; Lu Yung-feng
- Starring: Ella Chen; Mike He; Chris Wang; Da Yuan; Beatrice Fang; Jack Kao; Pan Hui-chen Pan; Toyoharu Kitamura
- Cinematography: Randy Che
- Edited by: Chen Hsiao-dong; Liao Ming-yi
- Music by: Wang Yen-meng
- Production company: Alkemi Films
- Distributed by: Buena Vista Film Co., Ltd.
- Release date: April 3, 2012
- Running time: 95 minutes
- Country: Taiwan
- Languages: Mandarin; Taiwanese

Bad Girls (Chinese: 女孩壞壞; pinyin: Nu Hai Huai Huai) is a 2012 Taiwan romance comedy film starring Ella Chen and Mike He, with Chris Wang, Da Yuan, Beatrice Fang, Jack Kao, Hui-Chen Pan and Toyoharu Kitamura in supporting roles. It was directed by Seven Wong.

The movie is about a high school tomboy who accidentally becomes the lead actress of a romantic teen idol movie and falls in love with Taiwan's top male idol.

== Plot ==
Dan (Ella Chen) is a high school tomboy who has developed a mindset that most males are bad and like to bully females because of watching her mother cried over a "bad man movie" when she was young. Ever since then she has stood up to any males that bully females. Together with her friends Pei (Da Yuan) and Mi (Beatrice Fang) they form a group calling themselves "Bad Girls" to stand up for all females who are bullied by males.

One day a film crew is at Dan's school with Taiwan's #1 male idol Justin (Mike He) to film a romance idol movie. While chasing her younger sister around her school for making fun of her, Dan accidentally stumbles on to the filming area without noticing and injures the lead actress Jessica (Mandy Wei). Justin suggests that Dan become the new lead actress to compensate for injuring Jessica. Dan refuses, denying that she had any fault in what happened. When her school principal threatens to call her mother to school, Dan agrees to being the new lead actress. At first she thinks filming a movie will be easy, until she has to put in a lot of effort in acting for her role and experiencing what it takes to make a movie. As filming progresses, she gets to know Justin better and realizes that his passion is not being an actor but baking. She also starts falling for Justin and realizes that not all males are as bad as she thinks.

== Cast ==
- Ella Chen 陳嘉樺 as Dan 阿丹
- Mike He 賀軍翔 as Justin 贾斯汀
- Da Yuan 林盈臻 as Pei 佩佩
- Beatrice Fang 方志友 as Mi 小米
- Jack Kao 高捷 as Justin's uncle Matthew and Manager 馬修
- Hui-Chen Pan 潘麗麗 as Dan's mother 丹媽
- Chris Wang 宥勝 as the makeup artist 小捲哥
- Toyoharu Kitamura 北村豐晴 as film director 胖導
- Megan Wan 萬萱琪 as Dan's younger sister 小希
- Mandy Wei 魏蔓 as Jessica the original lead actress 潔西卡
- Chu Lu-hao 朱陸豪 as Dan's father 丹爸
- Pao-Chun Wu 吳寶春 as Justin's father 賈斯汀爸
- Ying Wei-min 應蔚民 as Mr. Hsieh the town's Mayor 鎮長
- Mandy Peng 彭曼淩 as Young Dan 小阿丹
- Daniel Bi 畢曉海 as Young Justin 小賈斯汀
- Ariel Li 李柏萱 as Young Pei 小佩佩
- Katrina Yu 余若晴 as Young Mi 小小米
- Kerr Hsu 許時豪 as movie extra who does not cooperate 那個誰
- Blair Chang 張珮瑩(小8) as the idol romance film producer 劇中製片
- Cin-Yu Pan 潘親御 as boy bully 潘帥

== Soundtrack ==
- "Bad Girls" 坏女孩 by Ella Chen 陳嘉樺
- "Love This Place" 初戀的地方 by Teresa Teng 鄧麗君
- "What Is Love" 愛像什麼 by Ella Chen 陳嘉樺
- "Know Me Before You Love Me" by Ella Chen 陳嘉樺 ft. Tank
- "I Am What I Am" 我就是我 by Ella Chen 陳嘉樺

== Filming locations ==
- New Taipei City, Danshui District - Tam-Shui Vocational High School 新北市淡水區淡水商工
- New Taipei City, Rueifang District - Rueifang District New Taipei City Park 新北市瑞芳區侯硐園區
- Jingtong railway station in Pingxi District, New Taipei
