= The Lying Game (Taiwanese TV series) =

- Promotion poster
- Also known as: 無謊; Love SOS; X Lie
- Genre: Mystery, Romance
- Directed by: Danny Dun, Hu Xue-lin
- Starring: Ella Chen, Wu Kang-jen, Vivi Lee, Lawrence Ko
- Opening theme: "Never Be the Same" by Eve Ai
- Ending theme: "The Real Me"(真的我) by Ella Chen
- Country of origin: Taiwan
- Original languages: Mandarin; English less Hokkien
- No. of episodes: 13 Episode (Only Taiwan)

Production
- Producers: Yang Hong-zhi, Yang Yu-hua
- Production location: Taiwan
- Running time: 90 minutes (with advertising)
- Production company: Deepwater Digital Support Inc.

Original release
- Network: CTV
- Release: 5 October – 22 November 2014

The Lying Game (Chinese: 謊言遊戲; pinyin: huǎng yán yóu xì) is a Taiwanese drama broadcast by CTV in 2014, starring Ella Chen, Wu Kang-jen, Lawrence Ko and Vivi Lee. It started airing on CTV on October 5, 2014. The drama received an allowance of 2014 high-quality TV program from the Ministry of Culture of Taiwan for NTD 6 million dollars. The original screenplay of this drama was later adapted into the novel "The Lying Game" by the writer "Di Fer". Before the drama was broadcast, it was sold to 15 countries, including China, Hong Kong, Macao, Southeast Asia and North America, as well as South Africa and Mongolia, where purchase of Taiwanese drama in previous years had been rare.

== Broadcast ==
Channel	Location	Date	Time
CTV	Taiwan	from October 5, 2014	Every Sunday 22:00-23:30
CTi Entertainment	Taiwan	from October 11 to November 22, 2014	Every Saturday 22:00-23:30
CTi Variety	Taiwan	from November 29, 2014	Every Saturday 23:00-24:30
CHT MOD	Taiwan	from October 12 to December 14, 2014	Every Sunday 20:30-22:00
CHT MOD	Taiwan	from December 21, 2014	Every Sunday 19:00-20:30
Now 101	Hong Kong	from January 20, 2015	Monday to Friday 21:30-22:30
HUB E City	Singapore	from April 10, 2015	Every Friday 22:00-23:30
ViuTV	Hong Kong	from December 16, 2017	Every Sunday 12:30-14:30

== Cast ==
=== Main character ===
- Ella Chen as Sun Zhen (Pretend to Writer X)
- Wu Kang-jen as Wei You-liang (Sun Zhen's boyfriend)
- Lawrence Ko as Xiao An (Writer X)
- Vivi Lee as Hu Xing-ai (Secret love Wei You-liang)

=== Other actors ===
- Zaizai Lin as Zhou Yi (Sun Zhen's best friend)
- Jett Lee as Sun Ping (Sun Zhen's younger brother)
- Lu Yi-ching as Sun Zhen and Sun Ping's mother
- Milton Jen as Sun Zhen and Sun Ping's father
- Tiger Wang as Jiang Qin
- Bruce Chen as Chen Wei-hao
- Chu Lu-hao as Gao Peng-hsiang (Bad guy of the drama)
- Deyn Li as Xu Guo-yong (Sun Ping's friend)

== Music ==
Song title	Singer	Lyrics	Composer	Arranger	Note
"Never Be the Same"	Eve Ai	Tsai Zhi-zhong (Adapted words)	Jessica Mauboy	Evan Yo	Title Song, Cover
"The Real Me" (真的我)	Ella Chen	Chen Xin-yan	Ella Chen	Terence Teo	End Song
"Unsolvable" (無解)	Ella Chen	Lan Xiao Xie	Chen Xu-chao	Phil Wen	Episode

== Promotional activity ==
=== TV promotion ===
- Kangsi Coming : September 9, 2014
