= Kaira Gong =

Singaporean singer (born 1981)

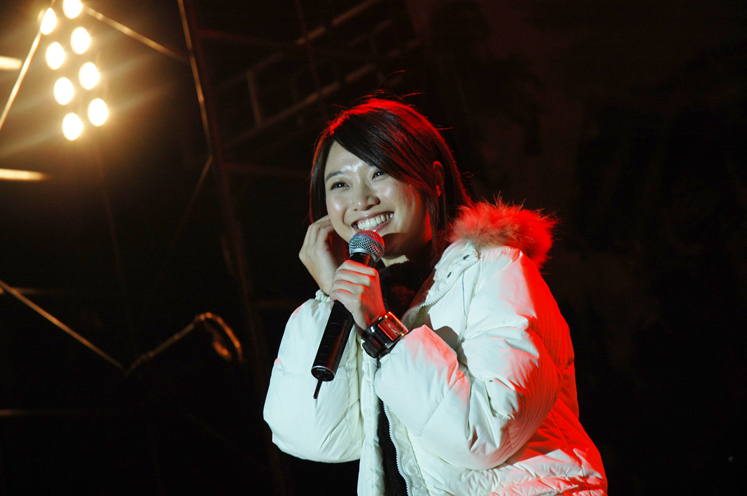
- Kaira Gong during a concert in 2007
- Born: 25 July 1981 (age 45); Singapore
- Occupation: Singer
- Years active: 2005–present
- Musical career
- Origin: Singapore
- Genre: Mandarin pop
- Label: HIM International Music (2005–2007)

Kaira Gong Shi Jia (Note: Chinese: 龚诗嘉; pinyin: Gǒng Shījiā) (born 25 July 1981) is a Singaporean singer. She sang the theme song for Singapore's National Day Parade in 2006, titled "My Island Home".

She was previously signed with HIM International Music, and is best known as the protégé of Taiwanese musician David Tao, as well as the label-mate of pop group S.H.E. On 25 December 2007, HIM International terminated its contract with Gong's management company.

== Early life and education ==
Gong was born and grew up in Singapore. She is the number two and the only female child in the family. Her father is an engineer while her mother is a housewife. She was highly active and rebellious during her childhood days and was involved in a fight with one of her secondary 4 classmates. She has loved to sing since her childhood due to the influence of her elder brother but she never thought of becoming a singer. She was in the school choir from standard one until standard six. She also learned piano for six years. She later pursued her studies in English literature and planned to become a primary school teacher. Gong studied at Pei Chun Public School, Nanyang Girls' High School, Raffles Junior College, and the National University of Singapore.

== Career ==
In 2000, Gong's senior who wanted to participate in a songwriting competition at National University of Singapore approached her and asked if Gong could sing on a music piece for him because he could not reach high notes in the song piece. Gong agreed to help and she won the "Best Performance Award" in that competition. She was then invited by Goh Kheng Long (吳慶隆) to sign a recording contract for her debut album production in Taiwan. Gong had never travelled outside Singapore before and she admitted that she was shy in nature. However, after some thoughts and encouragement from her family and friends, she accepted the offer two years after she was invited by Goh and before her graduation in 2003. Since then, the senior whom Gong only wanted to be identified as "Carl" has lost contact with her.

Gong prepared for five months for the production of her debut album Kaira (好,詩嘉). She was involved in the production of seven songs in her album, most of which are based on the theme of love. Goh became the producer of her album. David Tao was also signed to co-write the song "Far Apart but together" (遠遠在一起). Ella Chen of the S.H.E group also made a guest appearance of the music video of her first single, "To Have It Once Again" (再一次擁有). She cared for Gong's well-being and also taught Gong some tips and tricks of acting. Gong's album has been listed on Taiwan's G-Music Chart at No 16. The song "To Have It Once Again" remained in the UFM 100.3's top 20 chart for 2 months.

The title of her debut album (simplified Chinese: 好,诗嘉; traditional Chinese: 好,詩嘉; pinyin: Hǎo, Shījiā) is a play on the Chinese name for Scarlett O'Hara (Chinese: 郝思嘉; pinyin: Hǎo Sījiā), the protagonist of Margaret Mitchell's 1936 novel Gone with the Wind and 1939 film of the same title.

Gong became a spokesperson for Ragnarok Online in December 2005, and also filmed a promotional video for the game.

In January 2006, Gong was reported to have cried on a Taiwanese TV show Love 9.30 (愛上九點半) hosted by Jacky Wu, after the latter asked her some tough questions. However Gong was quick to emphasise that she was just homesick at that time. Gong admitted that she was still nervous in front of the camera and she will keep quiet when she cannot speak fast enough like her Taiwan counterparts.

During her performance in 2009 Singapore Entertainment Awards, Gong indicated that she was busy working on her second album. Goh was also expected to participate in the production but the expected release date has not been determined.

During the 2011 Singapore Total Defence campaign, Gong was one of the 39 artists who took part in the production of "Home" music video.

== Discography ==
=== Albums ===
- Kaira 好,詩嘉 (November 2005)
- Kaira, repackaged with NDP tracks and MTV DVD (July 2006)

=== Soundtrack contributions ===
- "Running" 奔跑, "Missed" 思念 –The Ties That Bind (家财万贯), 2004
- "To Have It Once Again" 再一次擁有 – Reaching for the Stars, December 2005
- "Cannot Let Go" 放不下 – Tokyo Juliet, July 2006
- "When You Leave for a Little While" 妳要離開一些時候 – The Hospital, August 2006
- "Raining Tears" 哭雨 –Her Many Faces, July 2008
