= Phiaton =

South Korean manufacturer

Phiaton Corporation
- Headquarters: Fountain Valley, CA
- Area served: Indonesia; China; Vietnam; United States
- Products: audio equipment

Phiaton Corporation, a division of Korean company Cresyn Co., Ltd., is based in Fountain Valley, CA, specializing in the design and production of audio equipment, including headphones, earphones and headsets.

== History ==
Phiaton is a division of Cresyn, a large South Korean electronics company that was founded in 1959. Cresyn started manufacturing OEM headphones in the 1980s; nowadays it produces roughly 15 million headphones a month, operates 6 manufacturing plants and employs 15 thousand people at its factories in Indonesia, China, and Vietnam. Cresyn launched Phiaton in the United States in 2008 as an initiative to launch a privately branded high-end headphone line.
