= Lawrence Ko =

Taiwanese actor

- Born: 28 April 1977 (age 49); Taipei, Taiwan
- Education: Taipei National University of the Arts (BFA)
- Occupation: Actor
- Years active: 1983—present
- Musical career
- Also known as: Ko Yu-luen; Ke Yulun

Lawrence Ko (Chinese: 柯宇綸; pinyin: Kē Yǔlún; Pe̍h-ōe-jī: Koa Ú-lûn; born 28 April 1977) is a Taiwanese actor.

Ko made his film debut when he was four years old. He has had roles in the Edward Yang films A Brighter Summer Day (1991), Mahjong (1996) and Yi Yi (2000), as well as the film Lust, Caution by Ang Lee. In 2011, he starred in the biopic Jump Ashin! (2011). He also appeared in the films Will You Still Love Me Tomorrow? (2013), To My Dear Granny (2013) and Murmur of the Hearts (2015).

== Personal life ==
He is the son of director and actor Ko I-chen.

== Filmography ==
=== Film ===
| Year | English title | Original title | Role | Notes |
|---|---|---|---|---|
| 1983 | Papa, Can You Hear Me Sing | 搭錯車 | | |
| 1983 | Kidnapped | 帶劍的小孩 | | Television |
| 1986 | Dust in the Wind | 戀戀風塵 | Mrs. Lin's son | |
| 1988 | I Love Mary | 我愛瑪麗 | | |
| 1991 | A Brighter Summer Day | 牯嶺街少年殺人事件 | Airplane | |
| 1996 | Mahjong | 麻將 | Luen-luen | |
| 1998 | Hold You Tight | 愈快樂愈墮落 | A-che | |
| 2000 | Yi Yi | 一一 | The soldier | |
| 2002 | Be My Valentine | 二月十四 | Leonardo | |
| 2002 | Fancy 25 | 三方通話 | Fei Hsun | |
| 2005 | Three Times | 最好的時光 | | Special appearance |
| 2006 | Do Over | 一年之初 | Rat | |
| 2007 | Lust, Caution | 色，戒 | Liang Junsheng | |
| 2008 | Winds of September | 九降風 | | Cameo |
| 2009 | Au Revoir Taipei | 一頁台北 | Hong | |
| 2010 | Honey PuPu | 消失打看 | Sam | Special appearance |
| 2011 | Jump Ashin! | 翻滾吧！阿信 | Pickle | |
| 2011 | 10+10 | —N/a | Liu Chi's lover | Segment "Hippocamp Hair Salon" |
| 2012 | My Little Honey Moon | 野蓮香 | Ho Chih-kang | |
| 2013 | To My Dear Granny | 親愛的奶奶 | A-da | |
| 2013 | Will You Still Love Me Tomorrow? | 明天記得愛上我 | Stephen | |
| 2015 | Murmur of the Hearts | 念念 | Yu-nan | |
| 2015 | The Freezer | 冰箱 | Ant | Short film |
| 2015 | Touch | 偷窺心事 | A-ren | Television |
| 2015 | The Period | 潮騷 | Coach | Television |
| 2015 | The Kids | 小孩 | Wei-che | |
| 2017 | The Village of No Return | 健忘村 | Purple Cloud | |
| 2017 | The Gangster's Daughter | 林北小舞 | Dreamer | |
| 2017 | Missing Johnny | 強尼凱克 | Chang Yi-feng | |
| 2019 | Theory of Ambitions | | | |

=== Television series ===
| Year | English title | Original title | Role | Notes |
|---|---|---|---|---|
| 2001 | Forbidden Love | 逆女 | Wang Chi-han | |
| 2005 | When Dolphin Met Cat | 海豚愛上貓 | Wei Shao-peng | |
| 2009 | The Year of Happiness and Love | 那一年的幸福時光 | Lin Ying-hao | |
| 2011 | Skip Beat! | 華麗的挑戰 | Director Aragaki | Episodes 4-5 |
| 2014 | The Lying Game | 謊言遊戲 | Andy An Shih-chieh | |

=== Music video appearances ===
| Year | Artist | Song title |
|---|---|---|
| 1996 | Chang Yu-sheng | "Ki Hion Gun Kwa Mai" |
| 1996 | Zheng Zhihua | "Mahjong" |
| 2004 | Fish Leong | "Quiet Summer" |
| 2004 | Winnie Hsin | "I Will Also Fall in Love with Someone" |
| 2006 | Gary Chaw | "Superwoman" |
| 2007 | Ivana Wong | "Learn" |
| 2011 | Na Ying | "You Say…" |
| 2015 | Amit | "Insomnia" |
| 2016 | Miss Stocking | "Long River Night Train" |
| 2016 | Amber An | "Stop Hang in There" |

== Awards and nominations ==
| Year | Award | Category | Nominated work | Result |
|---|---|---|---|---|
| 2011 | 13th Taipei Film Awards | Best Supporting Actor | Jump Ashin! | Won |
| 2011 | 48th Golden Horse Awards | Best Supporting Actor | Jump Ashin! | Nominated |
| 2012 | 6th Asian Film Awards | Best Supporting Actor | Jump Ashin! | Won |
| 2014 | 14th Chinese Film Media Awards | Best Supporting Actor | Will You Still Love Me Tomorrow? | Nominated |
| 2015 | 52nd Golden Horse Awards | Best Supporting Actor | Murmur of the Hearts | Nominated |
| 2016 | Hong Kong Film Critics Society Awards | Best Actor | Murmur of the Hearts | Nominated |
