= The Missing Piece (film) =

2015 Taiwanese romantic comedy film

- The Missing Piece official poster
- Traditional Chinese: 缺角一族
- Simplified Chinese: 缺角一族
- Directed by: Chiang Fong-hong
- Written by: Huang Shu-yun; Chen Yi-ju
- Produced by: Huang You-hua
- Starring: Ella Chen; Austin Lin; Tsai Chen-nan; Lin Mei-chao; Ying Wei-min
- Cinematography: Chiang Shen-feng
- Edited by: Ho Jien-huei
- Music by: Chung Chi-chan
- Production companies: Three-Giant Production Co., Ltd.
- Distributed by: Hualien Media International
- Release dates: 15 May 2015 (Taiwan); 6 March 2016 (Osaka Asian Film Festival)
- Running time: 104 minutes
- Country: Taiwan
- Languages: Mandarin; Hokkien

The Missing Piece (Chinese: 缺角一族; pinyin: Quē jiǎo yī zú) is a romance, comedy Taiwanese film. It starred Ella Chen, Austin Lin, Tsai Chen-nan, Lin Mei-zhao and Ying Wei-min, and was directed by Chiang Fong-hong. The film was released on May 15, 2015.

== Cast ==
=== Main cast ===
- Ella Chen as Sha Sha (莎莎)
- Austin Lin as Lin Dao-feng (林稻風)
- Tsai Chen-nan as Uncle Tin-Can (鐺共伯)
- Lin Mei-chao as Auntie Hai-chu (海珠姨)
- Ying Wei-min as The Stone (石頭)

=== Guest cast ===
- Kao Cheng-peng as Lin Dao-feng's grandfather
- Wasir Chou as A-Nan (Sha Sha's ex-boyfriend)
- Albee Liu as Betel nut beauty
- Chang Hao-ming as Truck driver
- Vincent Liang as Uncle Tin-Can's son in the United States

== Music ==
Song title	Singer	Lyrics	Composer	Arranger	Note
"Almost" (差一點)	Ella Chen	Lan Xiao Xie	Chen Xu-chao	Zhang Bo-yan	Theme Song

== Awards ==
Year	Awards ceremony	Category	Nominee	Result
2016	11th Osaka Asian Film Festival	Yakushi Pearl Award (Best Actress Award)	Ella Chen	Won
2016	79th Houston International Film Festival	Best Film in Comedy (Gold)	The Missing Piece	Won

== Promotional activity ==
=== TV promotion ===
- 100% Entertainment : May 14, 2015
