= Listen Before You Sing =

- Promotional poster
- Traditional Chinese: 聽見歌再唱
- Literal meaning: "sing once you hear the song"
- Hanyu Pinyin: Tīng jiàn gē zài chàng
- Directed by: Yang Chih-lin
- Starring: Umin Boya; Ella Chen; Bokeh Kosang; Sakinu; Mason Tu; Huang Sue-May
- Music by: Chen Chien Chi
- Distributed by: Warner Bros.
- Release date: April 16, 2021
- Country: Taiwan
- Languages: Mandarin; Bunun; Taiwanese

Listen Before You Sing Chinese: 聽見歌再唱; pinyin: Tīng jiàn gē zài chàng is a 2021 Taiwanese comedy drama film directed by Yang Chih-lin and distributed by Warner Bros. The movie stars Umin Boya, Ella Chen, Bokeh Kosang, Sakinu, Mason Tu, Huang Sue-May. Inspired by a true story, the film took 12 years to develop. It gained attention for its nearly 8-minute-long end credits, setting a record for Taiwanese cinema. The film premiered in Taiwan on April 16, 2021. It was later selected as the opening film for the 2022 Ministry of Foreign Affairs New Southbound Film Festival and the 5th Hong Kong International Children’s Film Festival, where it served as both the opening and closing feature.

== Plot ==
The story follows a struggling elementary school in a remote Bunun tribal village in Taiwan. Faced with the threat of closure, the school forms a choir to compete in a singing competition in hopes of improving their reputation and securing funding.

The choir is led by a sports teacher, Fang Ya-ko (played by Umin Boya), who cannot read musical scores, and a substitute music teacher, Huang Yun-fen (played by Ella Chen), who reluctantly takes on the role of instructor and accompanist. Together, they train a group of Bunun children to prepare for the competition.

After an initial failure, the team regroups and incorporates Bunun's unique polyphonic vocal techniques into their performance. Their perseverance ultimately earns them recognition and helps save the school.

== Cast ==
- Umin Boya as Fang Ya-ko, a dedicated physical education teacher who becomes the choir conductor.
- Ella Chen as Huang Yun-fen, a contract-based substitute music teacher who reluctantly joins the choir team.
- Hsu Yi-fan as Shih Chien-chiang, father of two students and Fang’s former rival
- Sakinu as Wang’s Father, father of Wang sisters, paralyzed after a work accident
- Kulilay Saya as Wang Mei-niang, a cheerful chef at the school and a source of community support
- Mason Tu as Principal Lu, A seasoned and calm principal devoted to saving the school

== Awards and nominations ==
Awards	Category	Recipient	Result	Ref.
58th Golden Horse Awards	Best Original Film Score	Listen Before You Sing	Nominated	
Taipei Film Awards	Best Actor	Umin Boya	Nominated	
Taipei Film Awards	Best Screenplay	Yang Chih-lin	Nominated	
