= Ella Chen =

Taiwanese singer and actress

- 陳嘉樺
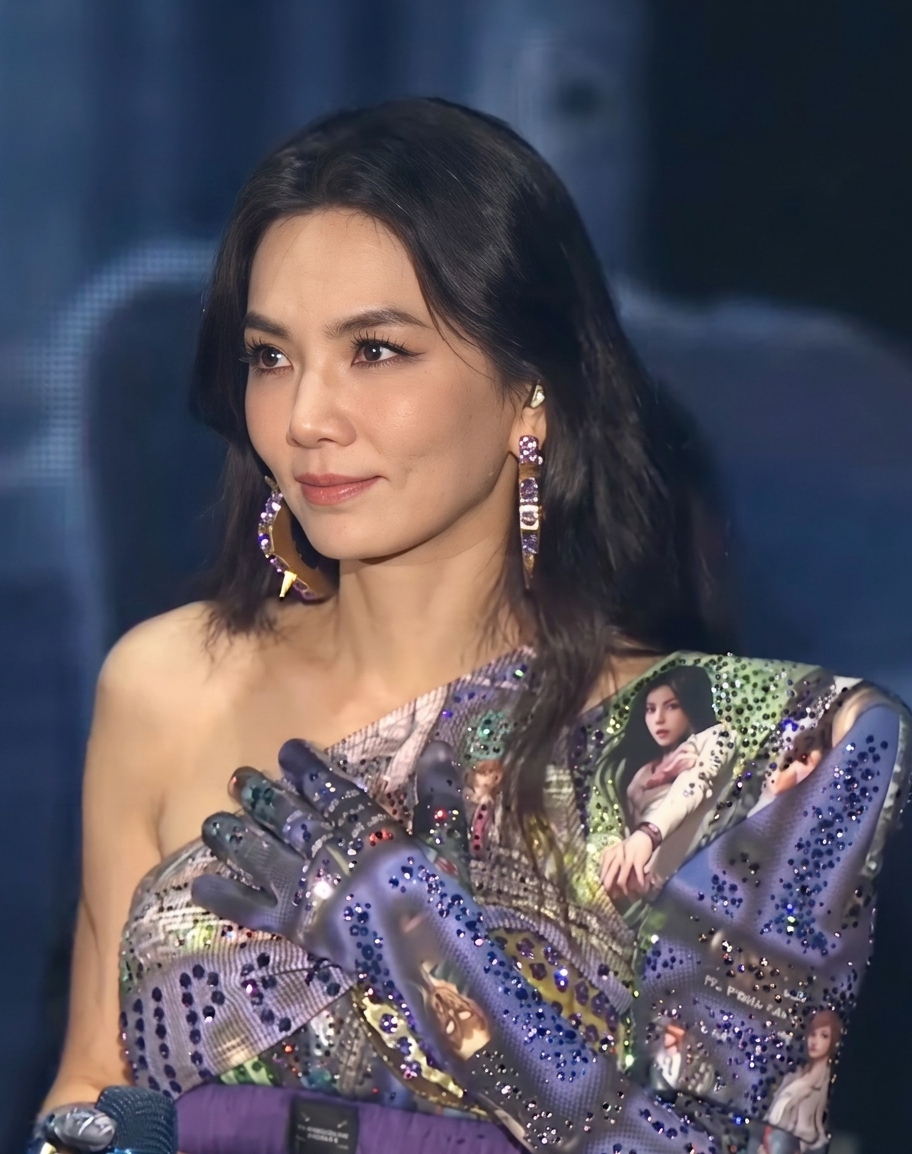
- Chen in 2025
- Born: Chen Chia-hwa; Linluo, Pingtung, Taiwan
- Occupations: Singer; actress; television host
- Years active: 2001–present
- Agent(s): EHalo Entertainment CO., LTD
- Spouse: Alvin Lai (m. 2012)
- Children: 1 son
- Musical career
- Also known as: Chen Jiahua
- Genre: Mandopop
- Instruments: Vocals; piano; guitar
- Member of: S.H.E

Chinese name
- Traditional Chinese: 陳嘉樺
- Simplified Chinese: 陈嘉桦
Transcriptions
Standard Mandarin
- Hanyu Pinyin: Chén Jiāhuà

Ella Chen Chia-hwa (traditional Chinese: 陳嘉樺; simplified Chinese: 陈嘉桦; pinyin: Chén Jiāhuà) is a Taiwanese singer, actress, and television host. She is a member of the Taiwanese girl group S.H.E.

== Musical career ==
On 8 August 2000, HIM International Music held a 'Universal 2000 Talent and Beauty Girl Contest' in search of new artists to sign under their label. When Chen traveled with her older sister to Taipei for a holiday, she discovered that her sister had registered her for the competition. Intimidated by the long line of contestants and worried of facing ridicule for her tomboy personality, Chen almost gave up before the first round, but her sister convinced her to stay. Chen's deep voice caught the label's attention, and she reached the final round. Her alto voice was noted for its strong and beautiful nature.

Following the conclusion of the contest, Chen returned to her duties at a local hospital, but received a call from HIM International requesting an additional audition. After test recordings were done, she signed on as part of HIM's newest girl group, S.H.E. Her English name 'Ella', which means courage, was derived from a personality test set by HIM Management Co. When Chen first tested out her signature, HIM employees were concerned that the signature would be easily forged due to its simplicity; thus, during S.H.E's early days, Ella signed autographs using the last character of her name, (pinyin: huà). However, as S.H.E's autograph sessions drew larger audiences, Chen reverted to her simpler, English signature.

During her career with S.H.E, Chen has been the most accident-prone member. On 29 July 2003, she was sent to the hospital after jumping from the third story of a building and injuring her spine while filming a variety program; the two other members refused to jump. She returned three weeks later to promote Super Star. In 2005, during the filming of Reaching for the Stars, Chen burned her ears and hair on a candle, prompting crew members to send her to the National Taiwan University Hospital. She stayed away from filming for two days, during which she cut off approximately two centimeters of burnt hair on both sides of her head.

In 2007, Chen was voted by online fans as Taiwan's most down-to-earth artist. Since the release of S.H.E's first album in 2001, Chen has usually been the one to answer reporter's questions. As the tomboy of S.H.E, Chen is frequently the subject of jokes targeting her gender and sexual orientation, but she usually takes the jabs in stride. In one online poll she was labelled as one of China's Four Main Tomboys of the past century.

On August 24, 2007, Chen released the charity EP Qiang Qiang (Chinese: 薔薔紀念EP), a self-composed work created in memory of her Pug, Qiang Qiang (Chinese: 薔薔). The dog had passed away from an allergic shock induced by anesthesia while undergoing treatment for an endocrine disorder. Deeply affected by the loss, Ella wrote the title track "Qiang Qiang" (Chinese: 薔薔) to commemorate her pet. Known for her dedication to charitable causes, she decided to publish the song as a commemorative EP. All tracks on the EP were written, composed, and solo performed by Ella, with all proceeds donated to the Animal Protection Association of the Republic of China (APA).

In 2009, Chen composed a song for her seniors Power Station, entitled "Love Crazy/愛到瘋癲" (originally titled Shi Mian/Insomnia (失眠), written after her failed heartbreaking relationship). The song was given to them as repayment for Power Station have given S.H.E the song "Freezer". Chen had also composed a station song entitled "Pop Radio 91.7 jingle" for Taiwan Pop Radio station "Pop Radio 91.7," 再这里 for Huang Yi Da (黄义达), 鸟 for Yao Yao.

=== 2012–present ===
On March 30, 2012, Ella released her debut solo EP, To Be Ella, which featured the theme song, insert songs, and the ending theme from her starring film, Bad Girls. In addition to the film's theme song "Bad Girls" (Chinese: 壞女孩), the album also includes the track "Shameless", the film's ending theme "I Am Just Me", composed by Ella herself, and a special bonus track: a duet with Greeny Wu titled "You've Been Written in My Song" (Chinese: 你被寫在我的歌裡, Chamber Music Version).

On April 17, 2015, Ella Chen released her debut solo studio album, Why Not. The album features three songs from her acting projects, including the ending theme "The Really Me" (which she composed herself) and the insert song "Unsolvable" from the TV series The Lying Game, as well as "Almost", the theme song for the film The Missing Piece.

On June 7, 2015, Ella Chen held her first solo concert, the "Why Not Showcase", at Legacy Taipei. Tickets went on sale on May 12 and sold out completely within one minute. Subsequently, she held concerts in Beijing and Guangzhou in August and December of the same year, respectively.

The album ranked 9th in annual sales in Taiwan, and the official music video for the track "Love Addiction" has surpassed 10 million views on YouTube.

On October 28, 2016, Ella released her single EP Me vs. Me (Hun Shen Shi Jin; 渾身是勁) with a limited run of 2,016 copies. However, during the initial promotion on October 22, the high retail price and the limited availability drew backlash from fans. On October 26, Ella personally addressed the issue during a live stream on her official Facebook page, announcing that the price would be reduced to a reasonable level in an effort to defuse the fan backlash.

In October 2018, Chen sang "Puppet" (Chinese: 傀), the promotional theme song for Zhang Yimou's film Shadow. This marked her first musical release after leaving HIM International Music to establish her own management company.

On November 14 and 15, 2020, the "ELLA Show: Entertainment Unlimited" was held for two consecutive days at the Taipei Music Center, grossing approximately NT$26 million over the two-day run. Following the performances, on November 16, 2020, Ella Chen released the digital EP "Ella Show Entertainment Unlimited Company", which features the main tracks from the live show, including "Don't Wanna Be A Song Without a Chorus", "A CA ELLA", and "Entertainment Unlimited Company".

On August 20, 2022, the "ELLA Show: Entertainment Unlimited" was held at the Kaohsiung Music Center. Tickets sold out instantly after going on sale on March 12, making her the first female singer to hold a solo concert at the venue since it opened.

On March 31, 2024, Ella released her second solo studio album, Bad Habits on digital platforms, followed by the official physical released on April 1. Subsequently, she held the "Bad Habits New Album Concert" in Taipei on April 13.

On September 10, 2025, Ella Chen officially announced her solo concert tour, It's Me, and released a video featuring Selina and Hebe. In the video, they promoted her solo tour in the name of S.H.E. The tour kicked off its first show on November 15 and 16, 2025, at the Helong Stadium in Changsha, China. The tour entered its second phase during the Beijing concert, featuring updated wardrobe designs, a revised setlist, and adjustments to the show program.

== Acting career ==
Her unusually deep voice earned her a starring role as the voice of Arthur in the Mandarin version of Arthur and the Minimoys.

In 2003, Chen starred in drama series The Rose (薔薇之戀) with Joe Cheng (鄭元暢) and Jerry Huang (黃志瑋). The drama was voted the Most Popular Drama at the 39th Golden Bell Awards.

In 2005, Chen and her S.H.E group mates were involved in a drama called "Reaching for the Stars" (真命天女), and she also performed the insert song "Only Then" solo for this drama, which was included in the "Reaching for the Stars OST". She was the only member nominated for Best Lead Actress at the 41st Golden Bell Awards. In 2006, Chen accepted a role in drama series "Hanazakarino Kimitachihe" (花样少年少女) with Wu Chun (吳尊). The show was popular both in Taiwan and internationally in China, Hong Kong, Singapore, Malaysia and in non-Chinese speaking countries like Philippines, Thailand, Vietnam, Cambodia, the USA and some European countries.

As a singer and an actress, Chen has also appeared in various music videos such as 愛的重唱曲-覆水難收篇 (2004-04-05), 再一次拥有 (2005) by Kaira Gong and 愛到瘋癲 (2009) by Power Station.

2010 marked Chen's return to the drama series arena when she starred alongside Jerry Yan (言承旭), in "Down With Love" (就想賴著妳).

In 2012, Chen ventured onto the big screen in her first full-length film New Perfect Two (新天生一對) alongside Vic Chou (周渝民). This was immediately followed by another equally successful movie, Bad Girls (女孩坏坏) with Mike He (賀軍翔). Bad Girls' theme song was covered by Chen and became the carrier single of her first commercial mini album entitled "To Be Ella/I am Chen Jia Hua", which topped the charts all over Asia and gained various praises from the critics and nominations from different award giving bodies on the same year.

In 2013, Chen filmed a Chinese New Year Drama in Shanghai entitled Ji Pin Da Zuo Zhan which required her to film one month straight as she went back and forth from Taiwan to Shanghai to fulfill her group activities in her home country.

Chen also hosted a dating show, "Take Me Out", with Harlem Yu which began airing on 13 April 2013. She was nominated for Best Entertainment TV Show Host along with Yu at the 49th Golden Bell Awards. Chen was a judge in Season 2 of the Chinese reality singing television show, Masked Singer.

In March 2016, the film "The Missing Piece", starring Ella, was selected for the competition section of "The 11th Osaka Asian Film Festival", where she won the "Yakushi Pearl Award" (Best Actor Award) for her performance.

Chen was a vocal mentor on Produce 101 China, which aired in 2018. In 2020, Chen joined Season 2 of the Chinese survival show, Youth With You (Season 2), which was previously known as the third season of Idol Producer, as a vocal coach along with Cai Xukun, Lisa, and Jony J.

In 2023, Chen participated in the fourth season of the Chinese reality singing survival show Ride the Wind (previously known as Sisters Who Make Waves), where she ended up placing first.

== Personal life ==
In October 2016, Chen announced that she was 6 weeks pregnant with her first child with her husband, Alvin Lai, who is Malaysian. Their child, a boy, was born on 12 April 2017. She first revealed her son nine months after his birth on social media. He later appeared at S.H.E 17th anniversary concert as a surprise guest.

== Discography ==
=== Studio albums ===
- Why Not (2015)
- Bad Habits (2024)

=== Extended plays ===
- To Be Ella (2012)
- Ella Show Entertainment Unlimited Company (2020)

== Concerts ==
Concert Name	Date	City	Country	Venue	Ref.
Ella's Show Entertainment Unlimited	November 14, 2020	Taipei	Taiwan	Taipei Music Center	
Ella's Show Entertainment Unlimited	November 15, 2020	Taipei	Taiwan	Taipei Music Center	
Ella's Show Entertainment Unlimited	August 20, 2022	Kaohsiung	Taiwan	Kaohsiung Music Center	

Concert Name	Date	City	Country	Venue	Ref.
"It's Me" Tour	November 15, 2025	Changsha	China	Helong Stadium	
"It's Me" Tour	November 16, 2025	Changsha	China	Helong Stadium	
"It's Me" Tour	November 28, 2025	Hangzhou	China	Hangzhou Olympic Sports Center Tennis Center	
"It's Me" Tour	November 29, 2025	Hangzhou	China	Hangzhou Olympic Sports Center Tennis Center	
"It's Me" Tour	December 20, 2025	Guangzhou	China	Guangzhou Asian Games Town Gymnasium	
"It's Me" Tour	December 21, 2025	Guangzhou	China	Guangzhou Asian Games Town Gymnasium	
"It's Me" Tour	January 24, 2026	Shanghai	China	Shanghai Oriental Sports Center	
"It's Me" Tour	January 25, 2026	Shanghai	China	Shanghai Oriental Sports Center	
"It's Me" Tour	February 7, 2026	Nanning	China	Guangxi Sports Center Gymnasium	
"It's Me" Tour	February 8, 2026	Nanning	China	Guangxi Sports Center Gymnasium	
"It's Me" Tour	March 7, 2026	Xi'an	China	Xi'an Olympic Sports Center Gymnasium	
"It's Me" Tour	March 8, 2026	Xi'an	China	Xi'an Olympic Sports Center Gymnasium	
"It's Me" Tour	March 21, 2026	Chongqing	China	Chongqing International Expo Center	
"It's Me" Tour	March 22, 2026	Chongqing	China	Chongqing International Expo Center	
"It's Me" Tour	April 4, 2026	Fuzhou	China	Fuzhou Strait Olympic Sports Center Gymnasium	
"It's Me" Tour	April 5, 2026	Fuzhou	China	Fuzhou Strait Olympic Sports Center Gymnasium	
"It's Me" Tour	April 18, 2026	Nanjing	China	Nanjing Olympic Sports Center Gymnasium	
"It's Me" Tour	April 19, 2026	Nanjing	China	Nanjing Olympic Sports Center Gymnasium	
"It's Me" Tour	May 2, 2026	Suzhou	China	Suzhou Olympic Sports Centre Gymnasium	
"It's Me" Tour	May 3, 2026	Suzhou	China	Suzhou Olympic Sports Centre Gymnasium	
"It's Me" Tour	May 30, 2026	Qingdao	China	Qingdao Citizen Fitness Center Gymnasium	
"It's Me" Tour	May 31, 2026	Qingdao	China	Qingdao Citizen Fitness Center Gymnasium	
"It's Me" Tour	June 27, 2026	Chengdu	China	Phoenix Hill Sports Park Gymnasium	
"It's Me" Tour	June 28, 2026	Chengdu	China	Phoenix Hill Sports Park Gymnasium	
"It's Me" Tour	July 4, 2026	Tianjin	China	Tianjin Arena	
"It's Me" Tour	July 5, 2026	Tianjin	China	Tianjin Arena	
"It's Me" Tour	July 18, 2026	Xiamen	China	Xiamen Olympic Sports Center Phoenix Arena	
"It's Me" Tour	August 1, 2026	Shaoxing	China	Xishi Basketball Center	
"It's Me" Tour	August 2, 2026	Shaoxing	China	Xishi Basketball Center	
"It's Me" Tour	August 15, 2026	Beijing	China	Wukesong Arena	
"It's Me" Tour	August 16, 2026	Beijing	China	Wukesong Arena	
"It's Me" Tour	August 29, 2026	Nanchang	China	Nanchang International Sport Center Indoor Arena	
"It's Me" Tour	August 30, 2026	Nanchang	China	Nanchang International Sport Center Indoor Arena	
"It's Me" Tour	September 12, 2026	Taiyuan	China	Shanxi Sports Center	
"It's Me" Tour	September 26, 2026	Dongguan	China	Bank of Dongguan Basketball Center	
"It's Me" Tour	September 27, 2026	Dongguan	China	Bank of Dongguan Basketball Center	
"It's Me" Tour	October 10, 2026	Ningbo	China	Ningbo Olympic Sports Center	
"It's Me" Tour	October 11, 2026	Ningbo	China	Ningbo Olympic Sports Center	
"It's Me" Tour	October 24, 2026	Ürümqi	China	Ürümqi Olympic Sports Center	
"It's Me" Tour	November 7, 2026	Zhengzhou	China	Zhengzhou Olympic Sports Center	

== Filmography ==
=== Television series ===
Year	English title	Original title	Role	Notes/Ref.
2002	Magical Love	愛情大魔咒	Juliet	
2003	The Rose	薔薇之戀	Zheng Baihe	
2005	Reaching for the Stars	真命天女	Ren Jie	
2006	Hanazakarino Kimitachihe	花樣少年少女	Lu Ruixi (Ashiya Mizuki)	
2007	The Lollipop Idol Drama	棒棒糖偶像劇	Herself	
2010	Down With Love	就想赖着你	Yang Guo	
2013	Ji Pin Da Zuo Zhan	極品大作戰	Yang Aiwa	
2014	The Lying Game	謊言遊戲	Sun Zhen	
2014	Love by the River	河畔卿卿	Chen Yuanxiu	cameo
2023	Dr. Lifesaver	生命捕手	Xu Min’an	
2024	Dr. Lifesaver 2	生命捕手2	Xu Min’an	
2024	Us Without Sex	今夜一起為愛鼓掌	Song Qingyu	

=== Film ===
Year	English title	Original title	Role	Notes/Ref.
2010	The Long Goodbye			
2011	Abba			
2012	Perfect Two	新天生一對	Ma Niu	
2012	Bad Girls	女孩壞壞	Ah Dan	
2015	Lucky Star	吉星高照2015	Wang Zu Hong	
2015	The Missing Piece	缺角一族	Sha Sha	
2019	Big Three Dragons	大三元	Shen Wu Que	
2021	Listen Before You Sing	聽見歌再唱	Huang Yun-fen	
2022	Summer	野夏天	Wu You-Li	
2023	Red Line	速命道	Hui Hui	

=== Variety show ===
Year	English title	Chinese title	Role	Notes
2018	Produce 101	創造101	Vocal Instructor	
2020	Youth With You (Season 2)	青春有你2	Vocal Instructor	
2023	Ride the Wind 2023	乘风2023	Contestant	

=== Music video appearances ===
Year	Song title	Artist	Notes/Ref.
2005	"To Have It Once Again" (再一次擁有)	Kaira Gong	
2007	"Personal Angel" (專屬天使)	Tank	
2009	"Crazy Love" (愛到瘋癲)	Power Station	
2017	"Beginning of the End" (終於結束的起點)	Mayday	
2019	"Like Boom Boom" (來個蹦蹦)	Nine One One	

== Awards and nominations ==
Year	Award ceremony	Award	Work	Result	Ref.
2006	41st Golden Bell Awards	Best Leading Actress in a Television Series	Reaching for the Stars	Nominated	
2014	49th Golden Bell Awards	Best Host in a Variety Show	Take Me Out Taiwan (Chinese: 王子的約會)	Nominated	
2015	China Music Awards	Most Popular Female Singer (HK/Taiwan)	—N/a	Won	
2016	11th Osaka Asian Film Festival	Yakushi Pearl Award (Best Actor Award)	The Missing Piece	Won	
2016	Global Chinese Golden Chart Awards	Top 20 Songs of the Year	"Love Addiction" (Chinese: 信愛成癮)	Won	
2016	Music Radio China Top Chart Awards	Most Popular Female Singer (HK/Taiwan)	—N/a	Won	
2016	Music Radio China Top Chart Awards	Best Crossover Artist (HK/Taiwan)	—N/a	Won	
2016	Music Radio China Top Chart Awards	Top 30 Songs of the Year	"Love Addiction" (Chinese: 信愛成癮)	Won	
2019	China Music Awards	Most Popular Female Singer (HK/Taiwan)	—N/a	Won	
2019	China Music Awards	Channel V Best Movie Theme Song of the Year	"Puppet" (Chinese: 傀)	Won	
2025	KKBOX Music Awards	Top 100 Artists of the Year	—N/a	Won	
2025	Hito Music Awards	Most Popular Female Singer	Bad Habits	Won	
2025	Weibo Music Awards	Breakthrough Artist of the Year	—N/a	Won	
2026	Weibo Music Awards	Breakthrough Singer of the Year	—N/a	Won	
