= Down with Love (TV series) =

- Promotion poster
- Also known as: 就想賴著妳; Jiu Xiang Lai Zhe Ni; Just Want to Depend on You; Stick with You
- Genre: Romance, Comedy
- Starring: Jerry Yan; Ella Chen
- Opening theme: "就想賴著妳" (Just want to depend on you) by Jerry Yan
- Ending theme: "愛上你" (Loving You) by S.H.E
- Countries of origin: Republic of China, (Taiwan)
- Original language: Mandarin
- No. of episodes: 16

Production
- Production locations: Hangzhou (China), Taipei (Taiwan)
- Running time: 90 mins (Sundays at 22:00 to 23:30)

Original release
- Network: China Television (CTV)
- Release: 31 January – 23 May 2010

Related
- Momo Love (桃花小妹); Scent of Love (就是要香戀)

Down With Love (Chinese: 就想賴著妳; pinyin: Jiu Xiang Lai Zhe Ni; lit. 'Just Want to Depend on You') is a 2010 Taiwanese drama starring Jerry Yan and Ella Chen. It was filmed on location in Taipei, Taiwan and Hangzhou, China.

It was first broadcast in Taiwan on free-to-air China Television (CTV) (中視) from 31 January 2010 to 23 May 2010, every Sunday at 22:00 to 23:30 and cable TV Gala Television (GTV) Variety Show/CH 28 (八大綜合台), from 2 February 2010 to 30 May 2010, every Sunday at 20:00 to 21:30.

Down With Love was nominated in 2010 for Best Marketing Programme (節目行銷獎) at the 45th Golden Bell Awards, Taiwan.

== Synopsis ==
Handsome, renowned lawyer Xiang Yu Ping (Jerry Yan) is seen by others as cold and ruthless. After his older brother dies in a car accident he has little choice but take in his brother's two orphaned children, Yu Fei and Yu Ting, whose mother had abandoned them soon after their birth. Every nanny he hires to care for them is either scared off by the mischievous children or ends up trying to seduce him. Fed up, Yu Ping asks his secretary, Yang Duo, to find a nanny that meets his requirements. Having lost all their wealth when their mother died and being abandoned by their father after racking up heavy debts, Yang Duo cannot ignore the fact that she needs the money and recommends her younger sister Yang Guo (Ella Chen) for the job, assuring Yu Ping that her tomboyish sister will not fall in love with him by lying that she is a lesbian. But the tables are turned on Yu Ping as he ends up falling in love with his new nanny.

== Cast ==
- Jerry Yan - Xiang Yu Ping 項羽平
- Ella Chen - Yang Guo 楊果
- Kelly Huang - Yang Duo 楊朵
- Michael Zhang - Qi Ke Zhong 齊可中
- Chen Zi Han - Ding Hui Fan 丁卉凡
- Cindy Chi - Xiang Yu Fei 項昱霏 (Yu-ping's niece)
- Xiao Xiao Bin (小小彬) - Xiang Yu Ting 項昱霆 (Yu-ping's nephew)
- Amanda Chou - Xu Yan Ling 徐雁玲
- Ku Pao-ming - Yan Bo Tong 楊伯通
- Yan Yi En - Liang Zhi Hao 梁志豪
- Jeno Liu - Su Fei 蘇斐
- Rong Rong (榮蓉) - Qi's mother
- Pang Yong Zhi - competition host
- Renzo Liu - lawyer
- Chien Te-men - rich man
- Kuang Ming Jie (況明潔) - rich man's wife
- Judy Zhou - A De 阿德 (Andy)
- Qian Shuai Jun (錢帥君) - babysitter
- Zhang Shan Wei (張善為) - gay client
- Vicky Chen - Yu Fei and Yu Ting's mother
- Du Shi Mei (杜詩梅) - Ding's agent
- Ma Guo Bi (馬國畢) - kidnapper
- Li Jia Wen - kidnapper
- Ada Pan (潘慧如) - Sandy

== Multimedia ==
=== Music ===
- Opening theme song: "就想賴著妳" Jiu Xiang Lai Zhe Ni (Just Want To Depend On You) by Jerry Yan
- Ending theme song: "愛上你" Ai Shang Ni (In Love With You) by S.H.E

Insert songs:

- "礼物" (Gift) by Jeno Liu
- "崇拜你" (Adore You) by Jeno Liu
- "单细胞" (Unicellular) by Jiang Ming Juan (江明娟)
- "惹你开心" (Makes You Happy) by NewYorker Band

=== Books ===
- Down With Love TV Drama Novel / 就想賴著妳電視小說 - ISBN 978-957-565-871-7
- Down With Love Photobook / 就想賴著妳幕後寫真 - ISBN 978-957-565-869-4

== Production credits ==
- Producer: Ke Yi Qin 柯宜勤 / Fu Bin Xing 傅斌星 / Siu Ai Peng 隋愛朋
- Director: Ke Han Chen 柯翰辰
- Screenwriter: Cao Qing Ya 曹晴雅 / Fang Yi De 方懿德 / Lin Ya Qun 林雅淳 / Xie Qi 謝琪
