= 48th Golden Bell Awards =

- Date: October 25, 2013
- Site: Sun Yat-sen Memorial Hall, Taipei, Taiwan
- Hosted by: Woo Gwa; Eddy Ou; Amber An
- Organized by: Bureau of Audiovisual and Music Industry Development

Television coverage
- Network: CTV

The 48th Golden Bell Awards (Mandarin:第48屆金鐘獎) was held on October 25, 2013 at Sun Yat-sen Memorial Hall in Taipei, Taiwan. The ceremony was broadcast live by CTV.

== Winners and nominees ==
Below is the list of winners and nominees for the main categories.

Program/Award	Winner	Network
Radio Broadcasting
Programme Awards
Popular music awards	Music of the Global Village	National Education Radio Kaohsiung Taiwan
Non-popular music award	Focus Music	Good Family Broadcasting Corporation
Individual Awards
DJ Award	Yuan Yongxing - "音樂歲月–說音樂的人"	Revival Radio
Non-pop music show host award	Han Yang - "When the Music Comes Knocking"	正聲廣播電台
Advertising Awards
Best selling Advertising Award	Sang Make insulation paper - Confessions of Dracula	Health Communication Service Foundation
Best Advertising award	Daren selling series	Police Broadcasting Station
Radio jingles Award	PRS Series Jingle	Total National Police Administration - Police Radio Station
Radio Marketing Innovation Award	"Thailand Would Like To See You" - Excellent Thai workers to Taiwan mothering children activities	Central Broadcasting System
Professional Channel Award	Professional News Channel	Taiwan National Radio Station
Television Broadcasting
Programme Awards
TV Series Program Award	Falling	PTS
Mini-series/Movie Award	PTV drama Life Exhibition - Power Process	Trough Films Ltd.
Education and Culture Program Award	Focus Treasures	PTS
Scientific Program Award	Rumors Chase Chase Chase	PTS
Children Program Award	Idiom Saien Si	PTS
Walking Program Award	MIT	CTS
Comprehensive Program Award	Bringing Up Parents	PTS
Variety Award	Who's Smart	Super Media Co.
Animation Program Award	Revisited Flying Squirrel Tribe	Taiwan Indigenous Television
Individual Awards
TV Series Actor Award	Vic Chou - Home	CTS
TV Series Actress Award	Miao Ke-li - Flavor of Life	Sanli Television Corporation
TV Series Supporting Actor Award	Lee Daniel Lee - "Home"	CTS
TV Series Supporting Actress Award	Esther Liu - "For fall every day bud"	PTS
Mini-series/Movie actor award	Long Shao Hwa - Speaker macro resurrection song"	金享亮企業有限公司
Mini-series/Movie actress	Pai Ping Ping - "That day my mother came to see me"	大夏數位傳播有限公司
Mini-series/Movie Supporting Actor award	Tang Chi Hwei - "PTV drama Life Exhibition - Power Process"	Trough Films Ltd.
Mini-series/Movie Supporting Actress	Mariko Okubo - "PTV drama Life Exhibition - Substitute For Love"	Xinjian Zong Film Production Ltd
TV Series Director Award	Wang Taiwan - "For fall every day bud"	PTS
Mini-series/Movie Director Award	Fan Yang Chung - "PTV drama Life Exhibition - Power Process"	Trough Films Ltd.
Non-Drama director Award	沈可尚 - "Record view - nesting people"	七日印象電影有限公司
TV Series Screenplay Award	Wen Yufang - "For fall every day bud"	PTS
Mini-series/Movie Screenplay Award	Chen Jiamin - "PTV drama Life Exhibition - Power Process"	Trough Films Ltd.
Children show host award	Liu Qingyan, Li Xuanrong - "Oven Book Club"	米迦勒傳播事業股份有限公司
Itinerant show host award	Shen Wen Cheng [Zhoushen Wen Cheng] - "寶島漁很大"	SETTV
Comprehensive Award presenter	Bowie Tsang - "Public Television Arts Avenue"	PTS
Variety show host award	Zhang Xiaoyan, Huang Zi Jiao - "紅白紅白我勝利"	Taiwan Television Enterprise, Ltd.
Photography Awards	李學主 - "Discovery - Tachiachi"	大愛衛星電視股份有限公司
Editing Award	Gao Ming Sheng - "PTV drama student exhibition - Fortune"	影動亞洲有限公司
Sound Award	Luo Yijuan, Li Yixuan, 鄧茂茲、高友峰、鎖際昌 - "Through 101"	PTS
Art and Design Award	柯青每 - "PTV drama Life Exhibition - A Midsummer Night Tainan"	Anze Pictures Ltd
Light Award	Zhong Qiongting - "PTV drama Life exhibition - three flowers pure haircut"	TransWorld Production Co.
Marketing Advertising Awards
Marketing Awards Program	An Innocent Mistake	SETTV
Channel Advertising Award	Life is full of moments "- a continuation of his own voice articles	Hakka TV
Innovative Technology Award	Ram Digital Film Co., Ltd. - "3D Taiwan"	Ram Digital Film Co., Ltd.
Special Award
Fong Fei-fei, Lubi Yun
