= Reaching for the Stars (TV series) =

- Promotion poster
- Also known as: 真命天女; Zhen Ming Tian Nu
- Genre: Romance, Comedy,
- Starring: Selina Jen, Hebe Tien, Ella Chen(Members of S.H.E)
- Opening theme: Xing Guang (星光) Star Light by S.H.E
- Ending theme: Zai Yi Ci Yong You (再一次拥有) by Kaira Gong
- Country of origin: Republic of China (Taiwan)
- Original languages: Mandarin, English less, Taiwanese Hokkien
- No. of episodes: 15 Episode (Only Taiwan)

Production
- Production location: Taiwan
- Running time: approximately 75 minutes- 90 minutes

Original release
- Network: Chinese Television System
- Release: 16 October 2005 – 8 January 2006

Related
- The Prince Who Turns into a Frog(王子變青蛙)

Reaching for the Stars (Chinese: 真命天女; pinyin: zhēn míng tiān nǚ) is a 2005 Taiwanese drama broadcast by CTS. This drama casts Taiwanese girl-group S.H.E, Anthony Guo, Chen Zhi Kai, and many others. The soundtrack was released in late 2005, the female leads S.H.E also contributed to the soundtrack. Reaching for the Stars aired its pilot episode during the final episode of The Prince Turned Into A Frog (王子變青蛙) series. The average rating of the pilot episode in Reaching for the Stars was about 1.17, while the final episode of The Prince Turned Into A Frog set a 2005 record for the highest average episode rating (6.93) and the highest episode rating (11.35). Reaching for the Stars only received mediocre television ratings. However, the lead actress Ella was nominated for Best Actress at the 41st Golden Bell Awards in 2006.

== Synopsis ==
Ren Xiao Jie (Ren Jie), Zhou Xin Lei (Lei Lei) and Shen Xiao Rou are three different girls who were born on the same date (February 14, 1983). On a CF commercial, they were brought together by destiny...

Zhou Xin Lei is the daughter of the president of the Zhou Corporation. On the date of her birthday, her father suddenly suffered a heart attack and died. Because of her father's death, Lei Lei was so depressed and stopped filming for her CF commercials. But one day, when she suddenly passed by her billboard commercial, she accidentally met Ren Jie who came to cheer her up after her father's death.

Policewoman Shen Xiao Rou was an orphan who lived together with her grandmother for the past few years without seeing her mother and father. All that was left for her is the necklace that her mother gave when she was still young. One day she was upset because the pervert she had previous arrested was released from jail. She went to look for him and beat him to a pulp. This resulted in a confrontation by her superior. She got so angry that she quit the job.

Ren Xiao Jie(Ren Jie) is also an orphan who was left by her parents together with her brother who suddenly has a heart problem. She worked on different jobs just to help her young brother cure his sickness.

Suddenly, they accidentally met on one CF commercial starring Lei Lei and the two of them (Xiao Rou and Ren Jie) were hired by the crew to become extras in exchange for money. Because of Ren Jie's hard life, she begged Xiao Rou to be on the commercial to help her get the money. After the filming of the CF commercial, they accidentally knew that the three of them were all born on the same date and year.

Because of the last will of Lei Lei's father that half of the company's shares will be given to his long-lost daughter, Zhou Xiao Nuo, Mrs.Zhou and Liu Shi Qiang compete to find Xiao Nuo. After knowing that Lei Lei was born with the same date and year as Ren Jie and Xiao Rou whom Xiao Nou was also born on the same date and year, Ren Jie was hired by Liu Shi Qiang to pretend to be Xiao Nuo. At first Ren Jie rejected his request but later on agreed to do the job for only a year because of health benefits for her brother.

Ren Jie and Lei Lei, were both in love with Zheng Hao, in the end Ren Jie won Zheng Hao's heart, they were apart for 3 months but in those 3 months Zheg Hao Proposed to Lei Lei. Lei Lei realizes that she doesn't have a place in his heart for her and breaks off their engagement.

After Ren Jie's one year pretending work, she hid from everyone and went to a place far away for 3 months. Suddenly Xiao Rou and Yao Wei who had a cafe on the same place, went to the known five-star cafe to study its designs. Accidentally, they saw Ren Jie near that cafe who has been working there for three months. At Xiao Rou and Yao Wei Cafe Lei Lei decides to show her cooking skills to be the chef at their cafe, a few days later on the 3 girls 23rd birthday, Yao Wei proposed to Xiao Rou and she accepts. A few days later Uncle Fu saw the necklace that Xiao Rou was wearing and her grandmother, she was already declared as the official Zhou Xiao Nuo, daughter of the president of the Zhou group.

On their 23rd birthday, Lei Lei and Xiao Rou went on Lei Lei's CF billboard to wait for Ren Jie and to celebrate their birthdays together whom all of them promised. After almost an hour, Ren Jie didn't show up but was hiding on a car nearby and cried after everything the two girls said.

On Xiao Rou's wedding with Yao Wei, Ren Jie hid from behind. But after Xiao Rou threw her flowers, Ren Jie, who was the one who caught the flowers showed up and met Zheng Hao whom both of them promised to be together forever. The three of them met again and promised to celebrate their birthdays together and forever.

== Cast ==
- Ella Chen as Ren Xiao Jie (Ren Jie) /Imposter Zhou Xiao Nuo (Episode 2-20)
- Hebe Tian as Shen Xiao Rou/Zhou Xiao Nuo (Episode 22)
- Selina Jen as Zhou Xin Lei (Lei Lei)
- Anthony Guo as Liang Zheng Hao
- Chen Zhi Kai as Xiao Ya Wei
- Yu Jin as Ren Ying Zhi (Episode 1 -20) Deceased
- Hsu Nai-lin as Mr. Zhou (Episode 1) Deceased
- Xu Gui Ying as Mrs. Zhou
- Lin Wei as Liu Shi Qiang
- Di Zhi Jie as Chen Kai (Episode 1 -15) Deceased
- Chen Yu Mei as Mrs. Xiao
- Zhang Fu Jian as Head Policeman
- Wang Jianlong as Yang Cheng-han

== Trivia ==
- In Episode 10, there are no opening theme song and ending theme song, and the episode lasts only for 17 minutes.
- In Episode 15, the episode lasts only for 06 minutes.

== Awards and nominations ==
Year	Awards ceremony	Category	Nominee	Result
2006	41st Golden Bell Awards	Best Actress	Ella Chen	Nominated
