= To Be Ella =

To Be...

EP 渺小 by Ella Chen
- Released: 30 March 2012
- Genre: Mandopop
- Length: 0:23:36
- Language: Mandarin
- Label: HIM International Music
- Producer: Bing Wang, S.H.E

Ella Chen chronology
Qiang Qiang (2007)	To Be... (2012)	Why Not (2015)

To Be... (Chinese: 我就是...) is an EP by Taiwanese Mandopop artist Ella Chen (Chinese: 陈嘉桦), the member of girl group S.H.E. It was released on 30 March 2012 by HIM International Music and contains five tracks with one bonus song and also three additional demo tracks on the bonus cd.

== Track listing ==
No.	Title	Lyrics	Music	Arrangement	Length
1.	"壞女孩" (Bad Girl)	Lan Xiao Xie	Zhang Jian Jun Wei	JerryC	3:38
2.	"我就是我" (I Am Just Me)	Ella Chen	Ella Chen	Bing Wang	4:13
3.	"懂我再愛我 (feat. Tank Lu)" (Love Me When You Understand Me)	Daryl Yao	Tank Lu	Jason Huang	4:19
4.	"厚臉皮" (Shameless)	Ella Chen	Ella Chen	Bing Wang	3:10
5.	"愛像什麼" (What is Love Like)	Ma Zhao Jun	Ma Zhao Jun	Bing Wang	3:37
6.	"你被寫在我的歌裡 (with Greeny Wu from Sodagreen (Bonus track))" (You've Been Written in My Song)	Greeny Wu	Greeny Wu	Kung Yu-chi	4:39
Total length:					23:36

== Bonus CD ==
1. "NTC (NIKE 2012 Be Amazing運動宣言歌曲)"
2. "330 (demo)"
3. " 公主Selina (demo) - (Princess Selina)"

== Music videos ==
Title	Director	Release date	Link
"Bad Girl" (壞女孩)	Bill Chia (比爾賈)	March 11, 2012	MV
"Shameless" (厚臉皮)	Gui-Chi (鬼才)	April 5, 2012	MV
"Know me before you love me" (懂我再愛我)	Shockley Huang (黃中平)	April 26, 2012	MV
