= Ella Show Entertainment Unlimited Company =

- Ella Show Entertainment Unlimited Company digital cover

EP by Ella Chen
- Released: 16 November 2020 (digital)
- Genre: Mandopop
- Length: 13:38
- Language: Mandarin
- Label: EHalo Entertainment, JSJ International Entertainment
- Producer: Kay Huang, Shuo Hsiao

Ella Chen chronology
Why Not (2015)	Ella Show Entertainment Unlimited Company (2020)	Bad Habits (2024)

Singles from Ella Show Entertainment Unlimited Company
- 1. "Good Night (晚安歌)" Released: May 18, 2020; 2. "Don't Wanna Be A Song Without A Chorus (人生不能沒副歌)" Released: September 23, 2020; 3. "A CA ELLA" Released: October 27, 2020; 4. "Entertainment Unlimited Company (娛樂無限公司)" Released: November 26, 2020

Ella Show Entertainment Unlimited Company (Chinese: Ella Show 娛樂無限公司) is the third extended play by Taiwanese singer Ella Chen. Released on November 16, 2020, the EP was made available exclusively for digital download and streaming, with no physical release.

== Background and release ==
Ella Show Entertainment Unlimited Company is the companion EP to Ella Chen's first solo concert tour of the same name, Ella Show: Entertainment Unlimited, which celebrated the 19th anniversary of her debut. Unlike her previous records, this EP was released solely on digital music platforms, with no physical copies produced. The album's concept centers around the theme of an "entertainment company", blending Chen's signature humor with reflections on her career and life journey.

The EP compiles the main tracks from Ella Chen's live show, Ella Show: Entertainment Unlimited. Among them, "Don't Wanna Be a Song Without a Chorus" (Chinese: 人生不能沒副歌) , "A CA ELLA", and "Entertainment Unlimited Company" (Chinese: 娛樂無限公司) are collectively known as the ELLA Trilogy.

"Don't Wanna Be a Song Without a Chorus", with lyrics by Francis Lee, music by Shuo Hsiao, and vocals by Ella Chen, was initially released as a single on September 23, 2020, before being included in the Ella Show EP on November 16, 2020. Because the music video relied heavily on post-production animation, Ella had to rely entirely on her imagination to simulate various actions during the shoot.

The title "A CA ELLA" is a clever play on the word "Acapella", turning it into "A-List Ella" (A-Ca Ella).

"Unlimited Company" serves as the grand finale of the ELLA Trilogy. It was custom-made for Ella by Kay Huang—the music director of Ella Show: Entertainment Co., Ltd. and a Golden Melody Award winner for Best Composer—alongside rising musician Mu-Chiao Chang. The track is a lighthearted tribute to Mayday's hit song "Life Co., Ltd." (Chinese: 人生有限公司).

"Good Night" (Chinese: 晚安歌), written, composed, and performed by Ella Chen and produced by Kay Huang, was first released as a single on May 18, 2020, and later included in the EP. Written from a mother's perspective, the song channels empowering energy as Ella sings about her experiences and heartfelt emotions of being a mother.

== Track listing ==
No.	Title	Lyrics	Music	Arrangement	Length
1.	"Don't Wanna Be A Song Without A Chorus" (人生不能沒副歌)	Francis Lee	Shuo Hsiao	Shuo Hsiao, Andrew Atkinson, Jeff Kerestes, Alex Pryrodny, Andrew Gutauskas	2:28
2.	"A CA ELLA"	Francis Lee	Kay Huang	Fanda Yuan	2:56
3.	"Entertainment Unlimited Company" (娛樂無限公司)	Francis Lee	Shuo Hsiao, Mukio Chang	Hsuan-ming Huang	3:34
4.	"Good Night" (晚安歌)	Ella Chen	Ella Chen	Chester Chang	3:40
Total length:					13:38

== Music videos ==
Title	Director	Release date	Link
"Good Night" (晚安歌)	Beryl Huang (黃鈺嵐)	June 8, 2020	MV
"Don't Wanna Be A Song Without A Chorus" (人生不能沒副歌)	Bill Chia (比爾賈)	December 4, 2020	MV
"A CA ELLA"	Bill Chia (比爾賈)	December 25, 2020	MV
"Entertainment Unlimited Company" (娛樂無限公司)	Bill Chia (比爾賈)	July 14, 2020	MV

== Concerts ==
Concert Name	Date	City	Country	Venue	ref
Ella's Show Entertainment Unlimited	November 14, 2020	Taipei	Taiwan	Taipei Music Center	
Ella's Show Entertainment Unlimited	November 15, 2020	Taipei	Taiwan	Taipei Music Center	
Ella's Show Entertainment Unlimited	August 20, 2022	Kaohsiung	Taiwan	Kaohsiung Music Center	
