= Zhengzhou Olympic Sports Centre Stadium =

Sports venue in Zhengzhou, China

- 郑州奥林匹克体育中心体育场
- Interactive map of Zhengzhou Olympic Sports Centre Stadium
- Location: 50m East of West Fourth Ring Rd, Lianhu Subdistrict, Zhongyuan District, Zhengzhou, Henan, China
- Coordinates: 34.7426°N 113.5308°E
- Owner: Zhengzhou Municipal Government
- Operator: Zhengzhou Sports Bureau
- Capacity: 60,000 (main stadium); 16,000 (indoor arena); 3,000 (natatorium)
- Surface: Natural grass (football field), ice rink (convertible in 3 days)
- Field size: 105m × 68m (standard football field)
- Public transit: 6 14 at Olympic Sports Center

Construction
- Groundbreaking: November 1, 2016
- Opened: September 2019
- Renovated: –
- Cost: CN¥7.2 billion
- Architect: China Southwest Architectural Design and Research Institute

Tenant
- 2025 National Games of China (planned)

The Zhengzhou Olympic Sports Centre Stadium is a multi-purpose complex in Zhengzhou, Henan, China. Opened in 2019, it is the largest sports venue in Henan Province, spanning 584,000 square metres (6,290,000 sq ft), and a cornerstone for national and international events. The complex includes a 60,000-seat stadium, a 16,000-seat indoor arena, and a 3,000-seat natatorium, designed to host sports, concerts, and exhibitions.
