= Why Not (Ella album) =

- Album Cover

Studio album by Ella Chen
- Released: 17 April 2015
- Genre: Mandopop
- Length: 0:54:16
- Language: Mandarin
- Label: HIM International Music
- Producer: Bing Wang, Yuan Wei Jen

Ella Chen chronology
To Be Ella (2011)	Why Not (2015)	Ella Show Entertainment Unlimited Company (2020)

Why Not is the debut studio album from Taiwanese Mandopop artist Ella Chen of girl group S.H.E. It was released on 17 April 2015 by HIM International Music.

The tracks "Love Addiction" (信愛成癮) and "Wasted Tears" (浪費眼淚) are listed at number 36 and 73 respectively on Hit FM's Annual Top 100 Singles Chart for 2015.

== Track listing ==
No.	Title	Lyrics	Music	Arrangement	Length
1.	"Why Not" (有何不可)	Wu Hsiung	Jing Yu	Yang Chao-yan	6:04
2.	"What's Wrong" (有事嗎)	Lan Xiao Xie	Tats Lau	Sandee Chan	4:27
3.	"Are You Normal" (你正常嗎)	Wyman Wong	Ogura Shingo	Martin Tang	3:15
4.	"Almost" (差一點)	Lan Xiao Xie	Chen Xu-chao	Zhang Bo-yan	4:24
5.	"Love Addiction" (信愛成癮)	Derek Shih, Alex Chang Chien	Alex Chang Chien	JerryC	4:34
6.	"Wasted Tears" (浪費眼淚)	Jennifer Hsu, Wu Hui-fu	Lin Cong-yi, A Reng-reng	Yao Hung, Phil Wen	4:33
7.	"Be Yourself" (想念自己)	Derek Shih	Paul Oxley, David Neisser/Chazz Traxx	Terence Teo	3:57
8.	"Snoozing" (賴床)	Chen Hsin Yen	GJ	JOSA	3:48
9.	"Love Letter" (情書)	Chang Chen-yue, Derek Shih	Chang Chen-yue	Huang Guan-hao	4:23
10.	"Age of 30" (30啊)	Li Yao	Ella	Phil Wen	4:08
11.	"Why Not!"	Wu Hsiung	Jing Yu	Yang Chao-yan	1:51
12.	"The Real Me" (真的我)	Chen Hsin Yen	Ella	Terence Teo	4:04
13.	"Unsolvable" (無解)	Lan Xiao Xie	Chen Xu-chao	Phil Wen	4:48
Total length:					54:16

== Concerts ==
Concert Name	Date	Location	Special guests
Are You Normal Concert (你正常嗎?唱演會)	June 7, 2015	Taipei, Taiwan; Leagacy Taipei	Selina, Hebe
Are You Normal Concert (你正常嗎?唱演會)	August 9, 2015	Beijing, China; Wukesong Arena-Space M	
Are You Normal Concert (你正常嗎?唱演會)	December 25, 2015	Guangzhou, China; RockHouse	

== Music videos ==
Title	Director	Release date	Link
"Why Not" (有何不可)	ZANYBROS	April 3, 2015	MV
"Are You Normal" (你正常嗎)	Lai Wei-kang (賴偉康)	April 13, 2015	MV
"Almost" (差一點)	SYDNEY SIE	August 11, 2015	MV
"Love Addiction" (信愛成癮)	Shockley Huang (黃中平)	May 3, 2015	MV
"Wasted Tears" (浪費眼淚)	Jude Chen (陳映之)	May 14, 2015	MV
"Be Yourself" (想念自己)	Jude Chen (陳映之)	June 7, 2015	MV
"Age of 30" (30啊)	San Ren-Shui (三人水)	June 17, 2015	MV
"Love Letter" (情書)	CHANG CHING YU @PING CHI	July 13, 2015	MV
"The Real Me" (真的我)	HIM International Music Produced	October 2, 2014	MV
"Unsolvable" (無解)	HIM International Music Produced	November 9, 2014	MV
