= Nanchang International Sport Center =

Sports venue in Nanchang, Jiangxi, China

Nanchang International Sports Center
- 南昌国际体育中心
- Interactive map of Nanchang International Sports Center
- Location: Honggutan District, Nanchang, Jiangxi, China
- Coordinates: 28.626278°N 115.816972°E
- Owner: Nanchang Municipal Government
- Operator: Nanchang International Sports Center Co., Ltd.
- Capacity: 60,000 (main stadium); 12,000 (indoor arena); 1,000 (swimming/diving hall)
- Surface: Natural grass (football field), hardwood (indoor courts)
- Field size: 400m track (standard athletics field)

Construction
- Groundbreaking: April 2009
- Opened: June 2011
- Cost: CN¥1.4 billion
- Architects: China State Construction International, BOK (Australia)

Tenant
- 7th National City Games of China (2011)

The Nanchang International Sports Center is a multi-purpose sports complex in Honggutan District, Nanchang, Jiangxi, China. Built for the 7th National City Games (2011), it spans 21 hectares (52 acres) and includes a 60,000-seat stadium, an indoor arena, a natatorium, and tennis courts. Known locally as the "Water Drop Stadium" for its shimmering, droplet-shaped design, it is surrounded by 75,000 square metres (810,000 sq ft) of artificial lakes and 87,000 square metres (940,000 sq ft) of green space.
