= Jane Zhang discography =

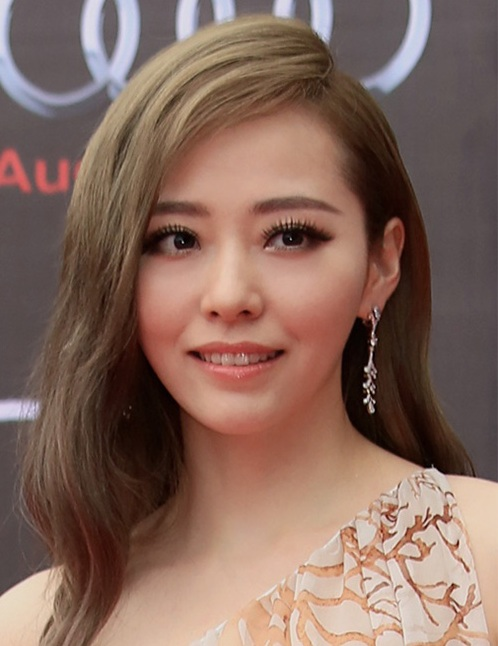
- Studio albums: 7
- EPs: 3
- Live albums: 6
- Compilation albums: 2

This is the discography of Chinese singer-songwriter Jane Zhang (Chinese: 张靓颖). Zhang has released seven studio albums, two compilation albums, two live albums and three extended plays.

== Albums ==
=== Studio albums ===
List of studio albums, showing details, sales figures, and certifications
Title	Details	Sales	Certifications
The One	Released: October 11, 2006; Label: Huayi Brothers; Format: CD, digital download	CHN: 1,000,000	
Update	Released: August 2, 2007; Label: Huayi Brothers; Format: CD, digital download	HK: 50,000	IFPI HK: Platinum
Jane@Music (张靓颖@音乐)	Released: January 20, 2009; Label: Huayi Brothers; Format: CD, digital download		
Believe in Jane (我相信)	Released: February 2, 2010; Label: Universal Music China, Show City Times; Format: CD, digital download		
Reform (改变)	Released: June 1, 2011; Label: Universal Music China, Show City Times; Format: CD, digital download	CHN: 100,000	IFPI Asia: 2× Platinum
The Seventh Sense (第七感)	Released: July 21, 2014; Label: Sony Music China, Show City Times; Format: CD, digital download		
Past Progressive	Released: April 27, 2019; Label: One and Only Music, Jane Zhang Studio; Format: CD, digital download		

=== Compilation albums ===
Title	Details
Starring Jane	Released: December 30, 2016; Label: Sony Music China, Show City Times; Format: CD, digital download
Starring Jane II	Released: March 8, 2018; Label: Show City Times; Format: CD, digital download

=== Live albums ===
Title	Details
I Love Teresa Teng	Released: August 7, 2006; Label: Huayi Brothers; Format: CD, digital download
Zhang Yuying 2007 Beijing Concert	Released: March 12, 2008; Label: Huayi Brothers; Format: CD, digital download
Listen to Jane Z Live	Released: June 4, 2012; Label: Universal Music China, Show City Times; Format: CD, digital download
Zhang Yuying, My Appearance Concert	Released: June 24, 2012; Label: Universal Music China, Show City Times; Format: CD, digital download
Bang the World	Released: March 29, 2017; Label: Universal Music China, Show City Times; Format: CD, digital download
A Generation of Fanghua--Teng Lijun	Released: October 10, 2018; Label: Universal Music China, Zhang Yuying Studio; Format: CD, digital download

== Extended plays ==
Title	Details	Sales
Jane, Love (Jane·爱)	Released: January 9, 2006; Label: Huayi Brothers; Format: CD, digital download	CHN: 500,000
Dear Jane	Released: December 8, 2007; Label: Huayi Brothers; Format: CD, digital download	
Grateful	Released: June 25, 2013; Label: Universal Music China, Show City Times; Format: CD, digital download	

== Singles ==
=== Mandarin singles ===
Title	Year	Peak chart positions		Album
Title	Year	CHN Billb. (Note: The Billboard China Top 100 chart operated from January to September 2019.)	CHN TME	Album
"Missing You, at 0:01" (想你，零点零一分)	2006	—	—	The One
"A Promise" (我们说好的)	2007	—	—	Update
"Close to You" (靠近你)	2009	—	—	Jane@Music
"If This Is Love" (如果这就是爱情)	2010	—	—	Believe in Jane
"I Believe" (我相信)	2010	—	—	Believe in Jane
"Just Love" (爱就爱)	2011	—	—	Reform
"Reform" (改变)	2011	—	—	Reform
"Personal Look" (我的模样)	2011	—	—	Reform
"Because of Love" (因为爱)	2012	—	—	Non-album singles
"Goal"	2013	—	—	Non-album singles
"I Am Mine" (我是我的)	2014	—	—	The Seventh Sense
"The Seventh Sense" (第七感)	2014	—	—	The Seventh Sense
"Bookmark" (书签)	2014	—	—	The Seventh Sense
"Forever"	2014	—	—	The Seventh Sense
"Dream It Possible" (我的梦)	2015	—	—	Non-album singles
"Make It Big"	2016	1	—	Non-album singles
"I" (我)	2017	38	—	Non-album singles
"Be Yourself" (做回自己)	2017	—	—	Non-album singles
"One Heart One Love" (一心一爱)	2019	3	71	Non-album singles
"But" (可) (with Joker Xue)	2022	—	1	Countless
"Starlight" (星光)	2023	—	27	Non-album single
"This Wish"	2023	—	—	Non-album single
"—" denotes releases that did not chart or chart did not exist.

=== English singles ===
Title	Year	Peak chart positions				Album
Title	Year	CHN Billb.	CHN TME	US Dance	US Dig.	Album
"Change Your World" (with Tiësto)	2015	—	—	—	—	Non-album single
"Dust My Shoulders Off" (featuring Timbaland)	2016	—	—	—	31	Past Progressive
"808"	2017	5	—	23	—	Past Progressive
"Work for It "	2017	—	—	—	—	Past Progressive
"Adam and Eve"	2018	—	46	—	—	Past Progressive
"Pull Me Up"	2019	54	20	—	—	Past Progressive
"Body First"	2019	64	22	—	—	Past Progressive
"—" denotes releases that did not chart, was not released in that region, or chart did not exist.

== Soundtrack appearances ==
Title	Year	Peak chart positions	Album
Title	Year	CHN	Album
"Song of Phoenix" (思美人)	2017	76	Song of Phoenix OST
"Daughter Country" (女儿国) (with Li Ronghao)	2017	—	The Monkey King 3 OST
"The Old Chang'an" (故长安)	2018	16	The Night OST
"I'm Not Here" (我不再）	2018	19	
"No Thoughts" (无念)	2019	12	
"Allay the Sorrow" (解忧)	2019	23	
"Spirit of Phantom Veil" (幻纱之灵)	2019	14	
"Butterfly Hurricane" (蝴蝶飓风)	2020	18	We Are All Alone OST
"Qian Bai Du" (千百度)	2020	18	
"Could You Stay With Me"	2020	50	
"Never Forget" (无忘)	2021	41	The Founder of Diabolism OST
"Wu Hua" (无华)	2021	12	Legend of Fei OST
"The Heart Moved Once in a Life" (一生一次心一动)	2021	15	Novoland: Pearl Eclipse OST
"Secret Love" (暗恋)	2022	24	
"Partial Star" (偏星)	2022	18	Immortal Samsara OST
"First Love" (最初的爱)	2023	36	
"Softly" (轻轻)	2023	29	
"Lonely Island" (化身孤岛的鲸)	2024	65	
"Moments We Shared" (云边有个小卖部)	2024	52	Moments We Shared OST
Heart Lake (心湖)	2026	—	Phantom Blade Zero OST
"—" denotes releases that did not chart, or chart did not exist.

== Collaborations ==
- "Another Heaven" / 另一個天堂 (with Leehom Wang) from his 13th studio album Heart Beat
