= List of Jane Zhang live performances =

Jane Zhang live performances
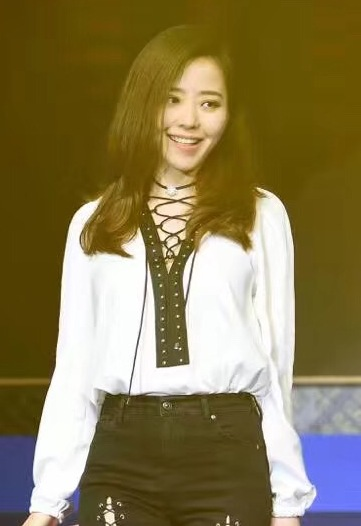
- Zhang in 2017
- Concert tours: 6
- One-off concerts: 8
- Promotional concerts: 4
- Fan meetings: 1

Chinese singer and songwriter Jane Zhang has embarked on five concert tours during her solo career, two of which have been worldwide.

== Concert tours ==
List of concert tours
Title	Date(s)	Associated album(s)	Continent(s)	Shows
Celebrate Tour	December 6, 2008 – December 13, 2008	Update	Asia	2
Believe in Jane Tour	August 14, 2010 – October 1, 2010	Believe in Jane	Asia	4
Jane's Appearance Tour	October 29, 2011 – November 21, 2012	Reform	Asia; North America	8
Bang the World Tour	June 27, 2015 – October 10, 2015	The Seventh Sense	Asia	7
Jane's Secret Tour	May 5, 2018 – November 10, 2018	—N/a	Asia; Oceania; North America	9
Light World Tour	October 14, 2023 – December 21, 2024	—N/a	Asia; Oceania; North America	25
Chase World Tour	July 5, 2025 –		Asia; Oceania; North America	

== One-off concerts ==
Title	Date	Venue	City	Country
Super Girl Jane Zhang Concert	March 31, 2007	Pasadena Civic Auditorium	Los Angeles	United States
Jane Zhang's Update Concert	July 28, 2007	Beijing Exhibition Center Theater	Beijing	China
Jane Zhang: We Said Concert	December 8, 2007	Sichuan Provincial Gymnasium	Chengdu	China
Jane Zhang: I Love This City Chengdu Concert	October 6, 2009	Chengdu Poly 198 Park	Chengdu	China
Jane Zhang: Love Concert	March 29, 2011	Haixinsha Island Asian Games Park	Guangzhou	China
Jane Zhang and her friends Concert	October 11, 2015	Chengdu Arcadia Theater	Chengdu	China
Jane Zhang's Memorial Day Concert	May 19, 2017	Tianhe Gymnasium	Guangzhou	China
Jane Zhang: Past Progressive Concert	April 27, 2019	Wynn Macau Ballroom	Macau	

== Promotional concerts ==
Year	Title	Duration	Shows
2006	The One Live Concert	October 18, 2006 (Beijing, China)	1
2009	Jane@Music Live Concert	March 29, 2019 (Tokyo City, Japan)	1
2010	Believe in Jane Live Concert	April 7, 2010 (Taipei, Taiwan) → April 25, 2010 (Shenzhen, China) → September 25, 2010 (Singapore)	3
2014	The Seventh Sense Live Concert	August 17, 2014 (Shanghai, China)	1

== Fan meeting concerts ==
=== ChinaMobile Jane Zhang's Fan Meeting Concert ===
Date	City	Place	Ref.
November 15, 2011	Shenzhen, China	Shenzhen University Center Gymnasium	
November 16, 2011	Chongqing, China	Alumni Hall of Chongqing Normal University	
December 2, 2011	Foshan, China	Nanhai Gymnasium	
December 14, 2011	Quzhou, China	Jiangshan Gymnasium	
December 15, 2011	Zhoushan, China	Zhoushan Theatre	
December 16, 2011	Hangzhou, China	Hangzhou Great Hall of the People	
December 17, 2011	Changsha, China	Changsha Tian Han Theatre	
December 18, 2011	Zhuzhou, China	Huanzhou Opera House	
October 13, 2012	Shanghai, China	Shanghai Art Theatre (Yihai Theatre)	
November 30, 2012	Xi'an, China	Siyuan Gymnasium of Xi'an Jiaotong University	
December 1, 2012	Nanchang, China	Nanchang University Gymnasium	

== Performances at national events ==
Date	Event	Country	Performed song(s)	Ref.
May 8, 2008	Opening Ceremony of the Japan-China Youth Friendship Exchange Year	Japan	"Impression of the West Lake"	
May 8, 2008	Welcome Dinner Banquet of Japanese Prime Minister Yasuo Fukuda	Japan	"Impression of the West Lake"	
August 16, 2014	2014 Summer Youth Olympics Opening Ceremony	China	"Light Up The Future"	
November 3, 2018	North Korea-China First Joint Performance	North Korea	(Unknown)	
December 18, 2018	Our Forty Years – Celebration of the 40th Anniversary of China's Reform and Opening-up	China	"Meet the World"	
May 15, 2019	Conference on Dialogue of Asian Civilizations: Asian Culture Carnival	China	"Please Stay, Guest From afar"	

== Performances at award shows ==
Event	Date	City	Performed song(s)	Ref.
13th Beijing Pop Music Awards	May 3, 2006	Beijing, China	"Just Relax"	
14th Beijing Pop Music Awards	January 23, 2007	Beijing, China	"This Damned Thing Called Love"	
15th Beijing Pop Music Awards	January 23, 2008	Beijing, China	"We Said"	
16th Beijing Pop Music Awards	January 11, 2009	Beijing, China	"Painted Heart"	
16th ERC Chinese Top Ten Awards	March 14, 2009	Shanghai, China	"We Said", "Heroes", "Celebrate"	
Baidu Entertainment Hot Point Awards	February 19, 2009	Beijing, China	"Painted Heart"	
17th Beijing Pop Music Awards	February 5, 2010	Beijing, China	"Painted Heart", "Mulan Star", "Little Back-Basket"	
17th ERC Chinese Top Ten Awards	March 27, 2010	Shanghai, China	"Mulan Star", "Could That Be Love?"	
18th Beijing Pop Music Awards	January 17, 2011	Beijing, China	"Desire", "La lsla Bonita"	
18th ERC Chinese Top Ten Awards	March 19, 2011	Shanghai, China	"Happy", "If This is Love"	
2011 Mnet Asian Music Awards	November 29, 2011	Singapore	"I Believe"	
19th Beijing Pop Music Awards	January 19, 2012	Beijing, China	"Angle", "Personal Look", "Just Love", "I Believe", "Reform", "Bold"	
8th China Gold Record Awards	August 31, 2012	Guiyang, China	"Not So Easy", "Painted Heart"	
20th Beijing Pop Music Awards	December 29, 2012	Taipei, Taiwan	"Concerto Pour Deux", "Hot", "I Believe", "Another Heaven"	
20th ERC Chinese Top Ten Awards	March 30, 2013	Shanghai, China	"Not So Easy", "If This is Love"	
24th ERC Chinese Top Ten Awards	March 27, 2017	Shanghai, China	"My Dream", "The Seventh Sense", "808"	

== Performances on television shows and specials ==
Event	Date	City	Performed song(s)	Ref.
The Oprah Winfrey Show	May 10, 2009	Chicago, U.S.	"Impression of the West Lake", "Celebrate"	
ATV Asian Million Star	April 25, 2010	Hong Kong	"I Believe"	
ZJTV The Voice of China	September 30, 2012	Shanghai, China	"Beauty and Bravery", "Dear Kids"	
CCTV New Year's Gala	February 9, 2013	Beijing, China	"Forever Friends"	
CCTV New Year's Gala	January 30, 2014	Beijing, China	"Missing You Everyday"	
CCTV Global Chinese Music Top 10	July 12, 2014	Beijing, China	"If We Keep Loving", "The Seventh Sense"	
Hunan TV I Am a Singer	January 2, 2015	Changsha, China	"Only For Love"	
Hunan TV I Am a Singer	January 9, 2015	Changsha, China	"Hungry Wolf Legend"	
Hunan TV I Am a Singer	January 16, 2015	Changsha, China	"Life Like Summer Flowers"	
Hunan TV I Am a Singer	January 23, 2015	Changsha, China	"Sing of Parting"	
Hunan TV I Am a Singer	January 30, 2015	Changsha, China	"Bang Bang"	
Hunan TV I Am a Singer	February 6, 2015	Changsha, China	"Wang Qing Sen Ba Wu", "Liber Tango"	
Hunan TV I Am a Singer	February 13, 2015	Changsha, China	"Whether"	
Hunan TV I Am a Singer	February 20, 2015	Changsha, China	"Sexy Music"	
Hunan TV I Am a Singer	February 27, 2015	Changsha, China	"All of Me"	
Dragon TV Shanghai Disney Resort Grand Opening Gala	June 16, 2016	Shanghai, China	"A Whole New World", "Someday My Prince Will Come", "Ignite the Dream"	
ZJTV Sound of My Dream	October 27, 2017	Hangzhou, China	"Fu Sheng Wei Xie"	
ZJTV Sound of My Dream	November 3, 2017	Hangzhou, China	"Sad People Don't Listen To Slow Songs"	
ZJTV Sound of My Dream	November 17, 2017	Hangzhou, China	"Wife"	
Victoria's Secret Fashion Show 2017	November 29, 2017	Shanghai, China	"Work for it", "808", "Dust My Shoulders Off"	
ZJTV Sound of My Dream	December 1, 2017	Hangzhou, China	"I Want Happiness", "Bai Suzhen under the Qingcheng Mountain"	
ZJTV Sound of My Dream	December 15, 2017	Hangzhou, China	"Only Love Strangers"	
ZJTV Sound of My Dream	December 22, 2017	Hangzhou, China	"Where Did the Time Go?"	
ZJTV Sound of My Dream	December 29, 2017	Hangzhou, China	"Eighteen Bends of the Mountain Road"	
ZJTV Sound of My Dream	January 5, 2018	Hangzhou, China	"Good Mood"	
ZJTV Sound of My Dream	January 12, 2018	Hangzhou, China	"Spoiled Innocence"	
ZJTV Sound of My Dream	January 12, 2018	Hangzhou, China	"Don't Stop", "Snail"	
