= Baidu Entertainment Hot Point Awards =

Award ceremony

Baidu Entertainment Hot Point (Chinese: 百度娱乐沸点) is an award ceremony founded by Chinese web services company Baidu to honor most popular celebrities, televisions, films, and other internet contents. The Baidu Entertainment Hot Point has been held annually since 2008, and cooperated with one of the Chinese most influential Television network Hunan Television to broadcast on television for the first four years. In the fifth year, Baidu started to release the award information on its own website each year.

== Winners ==
=== 2008 ===
Category	Winner(s)
Most Popular Group (Hong Kong/Taiwan)	S.H.E
Most Popular Group (Mainland China)	The Flowers
Most Popular Online Game Song	"Perfect World" by Shui Mu Nian Hua
Most Popular Music Video	"Damn Tender" by Ma Tianyu
Most Popular Rock Singer (Hong Kong/Taiwan)	Dick and Cowboy
Most Popular Rock Singer (Mainland China)	Wang Feng
Most Popular Male Singer (Top 3)	Jay Chou, Andy Lau, Wang Leehom
Most Popular Female Singer (Top 3)	Jolin Tsai, Cyndi Wang, Angela Chang
Most Popular Talent Show-Turned Singer	Chen Chusheng
Top 10 Songs of the Year	"Love'll Be Transferred" by Eason Chan; "Chinese" by S.H.E; "Corner with Love" by Show Lo; "Killer" by JJ Lin; "Damn Tender" by Ma Tianyu; "There Is a Love Called Letting Go" by A-Mu; “Chrysanthemum Terrace” by Jay Chou; "Rainbow" by Jay Chou; "Secret" by Jay Chou; "Blue and White Porcelain" by Jay Chou
Most Popular Animated Film	Ratatouille
Most Popular Film	Lust, Caution
Most Popular Director	Ang Lee
Most Popular Male Actor (Hong Kong/Taiwan)	Jackie Chan
Most Popular Actress (Hong Kong/Taiwan)	Shu Qi
Most Popular Television Drama (Mainland China)	Dreams Link
Most Popular Television Drama (Hong Kong/Taiwan)	My Lucky Star
Most Popular Talent Show	Super Boy
Most Appealing Singer	Li Yuchun
Best Male Artist	Jay Chou
Best Female Artist	Jolin Tsai

=== 2009 ===
Category	Winner(s)
Best Male Artist	Jay Chou
Best Female Artist	Liu Yifei
Most Popular Male Singer (Mainland China)	Xu Wei
Most Popular Female Singer (Mainland China)	Jane Zhang
Most Popular Group (Mainland China)	BoBo
Most Popular Group (Hong Kong/Taiwan)	S.H.E
Most Popular New Group	Top Combine
Most Popular Male Singer (Hong Kong/Taiwan)	JJ Lin
Most Popular Female Singer (Hong Kong/Taiwan)	Joey Yung
Top 10 Songs of the Year	"Beijing Welcomes You" by Various Artists; "Reluctant" by Stringer Zhang; "If" by BoBo; "Still Together" by Ma Tianyu; "Painted Heart" by Jane Zhang; "Rice Aroma" by Jay Chou; “Little Dimples” by JJ Lin & Charlene Choi; "Think Too Much" by Nicky Lee; "Story" by Xu Wei; "The Day After Tomorrow" by Jason Zhang
Most Popular Music Video	"Youth of China" by Li Yuchun
Most Popular New Singer	Jam Hsiao
Most Popular Idol	Li Yuchun
Most Popular Film/Television Song	"Painted Heart" by Jane Zhang
Most Popular Original Music Online Game	Hot Dance Party
Most Popular Olympic Song	"Beijing Welcomes You" by Various Artists
Most Popular Philanthropic Song	"Promise" by Various Artists
Most Popular Television Drama (Mainland China)	Magic Mobile Phone
Most Popular Television Drama (Hong Kong/Taiwan)	Fated to Love You
Most Popular Idol Actor	Ethan Juan
Most Popular Director	Chen Kaige
Most Popular Film	Red Cliff
Most Popular New Actor	Lin Chi-ling
Most Popular Male Actor (Hong Kong/Taiwan)	Tony Leung
Most Popular Female Actor (Hong Kong/Taiwan)	Charlene Choi
Most Popular Male Actor (Mainland China)	Chen Kun
Most Popular Female Actor (Mainland China)	Zhao Wei
