= Dear Jane =

Dear Jane may refer to:

- Dear Jane (band), a Hong Kong band with an eponymous EP
- Dear Jane (Jane Zhang EP) or the title song, 2007
- "Dear Jane" (song), by the Madden Brothers, 2014
- "Dear Jane", a song by Jamie Horton, 1961

== See also ==
- "Dear Jane" quilt, 1863 quilt by Jane Stickle and the pattern based on it.
- Dear Jane, I..., a Canadian rock band
- Dear John letter
