= Xu Xinwen =

Chinese singer

- 许馨文
- Born: Xu Xinwen; March 20, 1995 (age 31); Hengyang, Hunan, China
- Other name: Xinwen Xu
- Education: Sichuan Conservatory of Music
- Occupations: Singer; dancer; actress
- Height: 168 cm (5 ft 6 in)
- Musical career
- Genres: C-pop; Hip hop
- Instrument: Vocals
- Years active: 2016–present
- Label: Show City Times

Xu Xinwen
- Simplified Chinese: 许馨文
- Traditional Chinese: 許馨文
- Hanyu Pinyin: Xǔ Xīnwén

Xu Xinwen (Chinese: 许馨文; born March 20, 1995) is a Chinese singer, dancer, and actress under Show City Times. She is known for participating in the 2020 girl group survival show Youth With You 2 and the 2018 survival show The Next Top Bang.

== Early life ==
Xu Xinwen was born on March 20, 1995, in Hengyang, Hunan, China. Originally a dancer, she decided to study music after hearing JJ Lin's music. She graduated from the Sichuan Conservatory of Music at the top of her major, majoring in pop singing.

== Career ==
In 2014, Xu won the Tian Yi Fei Young Campus Singers Contest, a national singing competition for college students.

In 2016, Xu won the finals of the Migu Music National College Student League, another national college singing competition, and also won the Most Popular Award. Subsequently, she signed a contract with Show City Times, and on August 23, 2016, she released her first single, "In the Zone", in a collaboration with rapper Alex Hong. The song was produced by Jane Zhang and was the theme song for the movie Southpaw, and an English version of the song was released on September 5 of the same year. On November 22, 2016, Xu performed "In the Zone", "If I Ain't Got You", and other songs in the City Voice Campus Welcome Concert in Chengdu. On November 25 of the same year, Xu participated in the first season of the reality music show Sound of My Dream, performing Jike Junyi's song "彩色的黑 (Colorful Black)" and JJ Lin's song "翅膀 (Wings)". Her performance was praised by the mentors JJ Lin and A-Mei as being "very powerful" and "well prepared, having a strong stage presence". Xu also participated in the Super Hi Christmas Music Party Concert in Chengdu on December 23, 2016, singing the songs "In the Zone" and "翅膀 (Wings)".

On March 27, 2017, Xu performed "In the Zone" at the 24th Oriental Billboard Music Festival and also won the "Oriental Newcomer Award". On April 30, she performed "In the Zone" and Grand Funk Railroad's "Some Kind of Wonderful" at the 2017 Mount Emei Buddha Light Flower Sea Music Festival. She was also the opening act for Jane Zhang's 2017 MUSIC LOVE concert on May 19 in Guangzhou, performing "In the Zone" and "翅膀 (Wings)". On September 16, 2017, she performed "In the Zone" at iQIYI's 2017 Scream Night in Lanzhou.

On April 3, 2018, Xu released her first EP, "All My People", which consisted of the song "黑色外套 (Black Jacket)" as well as the English and Chinese versions of "All My People". On April 27, 2018, she released the single "Youth Anthem" with Alex Hong and Boss X, which was also featured in the "Vibe Presents Urban Asia, Vol. 1" compilation album by B2 Music. Later that year, on June 26, she released the OST "爱最闪耀 (Love Shines the Most)" for Sweet Dreams (TV series), and on August 13, 2018, she released the OST "一生的挚爱 (Love of a Lifetime)" for the drama Swords of Legends 2. Also in 2018, Xu made her acting debut by starring as the character Niu Honghua in the drama Only Kiss Without Love. She then participated in the idol survival show The Next Top Bang in November 2018.

On January 26, 2019, Xu performed "彩色的黑 (Colorful Black)" at the 2018 Fenghuang Network Annual Meeting. On June 29, 2019, Xu released the single "Some Hurts".

In January through May 2020, Xu participated in the girl group survival show Youth With You (season 2), in which she was eliminated in the 28th place despite being praised as the "top vocal" by mentor Ella Chen. On June 12, 2020, Xu released the single "Boomerang". On July 9, 2020, she released the OST "若 (If)" for the TV series Dance of the Sky Empire. In September 2020, Xu participated in Youku's live streaming reality survival show Go! Streamers. On October 14, she collaborated with UNINE's Xia Hanyu for the OST "奇妙反应 (Wonderful Reaction)" for the drama Meeting You. On October 15, 2020, she participated in episode 7 of The9's variety show Let's Party, and on November 6, she participated in episode 5 of Youku's talk show Mars Intelligence Agency. She then released the OSTs "Can't Nobody Love Me Like Myself" and "我说的 (I Said)" on November 13 and December 11 of 2020 respectively, both for the drama Something Just Like This.

In January and February 2021, Xu Xinwen participated in episodes 5 and 6 of Mango TV's program Let's Go along with UNINE's Xia Hanyu. On May 3 of the same year, she performed her songs "Can't Nobody Love Me Like Myself", "黑色外套 (Black Jacket)", and "Boomerang" at the 2021 Pop Songs Charts concert in Suzhou and also won the "New Sound of the Year - Female Singer" award. Xu was announced to be filming for the drama Love in a Loop on July 5. Also, on July 30, an official work studio for Xu Xinwen was announced. On August 6, Xu released the song "The MVP", which was also the title track of her EP "爱人规则 LOVER GAME". An MV for "The MVP" was released on August 8.

On March 20, 2022, Xu released the OST "如果" for the drama Maybe It's Love 2. On May 1, 2022, the drama Love in a Loop was broadcast on iQIYI and Tencent Video, with Xu Xinwen as the character Kong Feifei. On May 5, 2022, Xu Xinwen began filming for the horror-comedy movie To Be Continued. On May 10, Xu released the theme song "女士的法则" for the drama Lady of Law, and on September 21, Xu released the theme song "别害怕" for the drama So Young.

On May 30, 2023, Xu Xinwen began filming as the character Xie Yuhan for the youth drama Grow Up Together. On June 26, Xu played the character Feng Ming in the drama The Princess Royal. Later that year on October 21, Xu released the song "重启美好的周日 (Enjoy Sunday Night)".

On February 20, 2025, Xu Xinwen released the single "漂流". On September 29, 2025, Xu starred in the short drama Thriving in Her Thirties, a spin-off from the variety show Sisters Who Make Waves.

On April 24, 2026, the choir variety show Voices of Youth with Xu Xinwen as one of the 25 participants was broadcast on iQiyi. In August, the Voices of Youth choir participated in the 14th World Choir Games in Sweden and placed first in the C16 - Pop Ensembles category. On September 7, 2026, Xu Xinwen was announced to be starring in the original musical "西游"渡"记" by Xiao Ke in the roles of Baigujing and The Ruler of Women's Country; the musical had performances on October 1–October 7 and September 21–September 23. On September 24, 2026, the drama 长生契 (Live Forever) with Xu Xinwen as the character Qingyuan began broadcasting on Bilibili. On November 5, 2026, Xu released the single "悬崖上的玫瑰".

== Awards and achievements ==
Year	Nominee/work	Award	Category	Result	Ref.
2014	Xu Xinwen	TianYiFei Young Campus Singers Contest	National Finals Champion	Won	
2016	Xu Xinwen	Migu Music National College Student League	National Finals Champion	Won	
2016	Xu Xinwen	Migu Music National College Student League	Most Popular Award	Won	
2017	Xu Xinwen	24th Eastern Billboard Music Festival Awards	Oriental Newcomer Award	Won	
2020	Xu Xinwen	2020 Rayli Fashion Awards	Potential Newcomer of the Year	Won	
2021	Xu Xinwen	28th Style Gala Awards	New Artist of the Year	Won	
2021	Xu Xinwen	2021 Pop Songs Charts Awards	New Sound of the Year - Female Singer	Won	

== Discography ==
=== Extended plays ===
Title	EP details	Sales
All My People	Released: April 3, 2018; Language: Mandarin; Label: Show City Times; Formats: Digital download, streaming; Track listing: 1. "All My People (中文版)"; 2. "All My People (英文版)"; 3. "黑色外套“	N/A

Title	EP details	Sales
爱人规则 (Lover Game)	Released: August 2021; Language: Mandarin; Label: Show City Times; Formats: Digital download, streaming; Track listing: 1. "The MVP"; 2. "想"; 3. "Lover Game“; 4. "卡戎星"; 5. "妄图"	N/A

=== Singles ===
Title	Year	Peak chart position		Album
Title	Year	CHN	TWN	Album
As lead artist
"Some Hurts"	2019	—	—	Non-album single
"Boomerang"	2020	—	—	Non-album single
"重启美好的周日”	2023	—	—	Non-album single
"漂流”	2025	—	—	Non-album single
"悬崖上的玫瑰”	2026	—	—	Non-album single
Collaboration
"Youth Anthem" (with Boss X and Alex Hong)	2018	—	—	Non-album single
"智慧生命" (with Joyce Chu, BC221, Li Dawei, Cao Yin, and Gui Yumeng)	2021	—	—	Non-album single
Soundtrack appearances
"In the Zone (中文版)" (with Alex Hong)	2016	—	—	Southpaw OST
"In the Zone (英文版)" (with Alex Hong)	2016	—	—	Southpaw OST
"爱最闪耀"	2018	—	—	Sweet Dreams OST
"一生的挚爱"	2018	—	—	Swords of Legends 2 OST
"若"	2020	—	—	Dance of the Sky Empire OST
"Can't Nobody Love Me Like Myself"	2020	—	—	Something Just Like This OST
"我说的"	2020	—	—	Something Just Like This OST
"奇妙反应" (with Xia Hanyu)	2020	—	—	Meeting You OST
"另一个我"	2021	—	—	The Player OST
"Running Girl"	2021	—	—	The Trick of Life and Love OST
"如果"	2022	—	—	Maybe It's Love OST
"女士的法则"	2022	—	—	Lady of Law OST
"别害怕"	2022	—	—	So Young OST
"—" denotes releases that did not chart or were not released in that region.

=== Youth With You (Season 2) ===
Song	Original Artist	Notes
Sun (太阳)	Pika Chiu	Mission 1: Position Evaluation
MAMA - Chinese Version	EXO	Mission 2: Group Battle
A Little Sweet (有点甜)	Silence Wang	Group Revenge
Light Orange Island (浅橘色孤岛)	Xu Xinwen, Dai Yanni, Duan Yixuan, Song Xinran, Xu Ziyin, Zhang Yu, Zuo Zhuo	Mission 3: Theme Song Assessment
Lover (情人)	Cai Xukun	Mission 4: Cooperation Stage

== Filmography ==
=== Film ===
Year	Title	Original title	Role	Ref.
2022	To Be Continued	了不起的夜晚	Jiajia 佳佳	

=== Television series ===
Year	Title	Original title	Role	Network	Ref.
2018	Only Kiss Without Love	一吻不定情	Niu Honghua 牛红花	iQIYI	
2022	Love in a Loop	救了一万次的你	Kong Feifei 孔斐斐	iQIYI, Tencent Video	
2023	The Princess Royal	度华年	Feng Ming 凤鸣	Youku, Zhejiang TV	
2024	Grow Up Together	一起长大的约定	Xie Yuhan 谢雨涵	iQIYI	
2025	Thriving in Her Thirties	乘风2025之三十而励	Song He 宋禾	Mango TV	
2026	Live Forever	长生契	Qingyuan 清源	Bilibili	

== Television shows ==
Year	Title	Original title	Network	Role	Notes	Ref.
2011	Maiba Hero Meeting	麦霸英雄汇	Zhejiang Satellite TV	Contestant		
2014	Tian Yi Fei Young Campus Singers	天翼飞Young校园好声音	Shenzhen Satellite TV	Contestant	Finished 1st	
2016	Sound of My Dream	梦想的声音	Zhejiang Satellite TV	Contestant	Episode 4	
2018	The Next Top Bang	中国梦之声·下一站传奇	Dragon TV	Contestant		
2020	Youth With You (season 2)	青春有你2	iQIYI	Contestant	Finished 28th	
2020	Global Chinese Music	全球中文音乐榜上榜	CCTV-15	Guest		
2020	Go! Streamers	奋斗吧！主播	Youku	Contestant		
2020	Let's Party	非日常派对	iQIYI	Guest	Episode 7	
2020	Mars Intelligence Agency (season 5)	火星情报局 第五季	Youku	Guest	Episode 5	
2020	Film and Television Phonograph	影视留声机	CCTV-15	Guest		
2020	Super Hit (season 1)	宇宙打歌中心	Youku	Guest	Episode 8	
2021	Let's Go	出发吧	Mango TV	Guest	Episodes 5, 6	
2021	King of Dressing	我是穿搭王	Huya Live	Guest	Episode 4	
2021	Searching for Sound	寻声记	Shandong Satellite TV	Guest		

== Fandom ==
Name

- Mantianxin (Chinese: 满天馨); which means "sky full of xin" but is similar to the pronunciation of "sky full of stars" or baby's breath flowers ("满天星") in Chinese, with the "xin" (馨) character being the same as the one in Xu Xinwen's name.
