= Bang the World Tour =

2015 concert tour by Jane Zhang

- Tour by Jane Zhang
- Location: China
- Associated album: The Seventh Sense
- Start date: June 27, 2015
- End date: October 10, 2015
- No. of shows: 7

Bang the World Tour was the fourth concert tour by singer Jane Zhang, in support of her sixth studio album, The Seventh Sense.

== Background ==
In January 2015, Jane Zhang sang "Bang Bang" in the Chinese TV show "I Am a Singer". Subsequently, she was appointed as the Chinese Cultural Exchange Ambassador of the MLB Major League Baseball. Whether it is a song called "Bang Bang" or a "bang" hitting sound in baseball, "bang" always makes people excited, it represents a kind of vitality. So, Jane named the tour "BANG the World tour".

== Shows ==
List of concert dates
Date	City	Venue
June 27, 2015	Shanghai	Mercedes-Benz Arena
July 4, 2015	Changsha	Hunan Int'l Convention & Exhibition Centre
July 11, 2015	Wuhan	Wuhan Sports Center Gymnasium
July 18, 2015	Fuzhou	Wuhan Sports Center Gymnasium
July 25, 2015	Shenzhen	Shenzhen Bay Sport Center Gymnasium
August 1, 2015	Beijing	MasterCard Center
October 10, 2015	Chengdu	Chengdu Sports Center
Total
