= List of awards and nominations received by Jane Zhang =

Jane Zhang awards and nominations
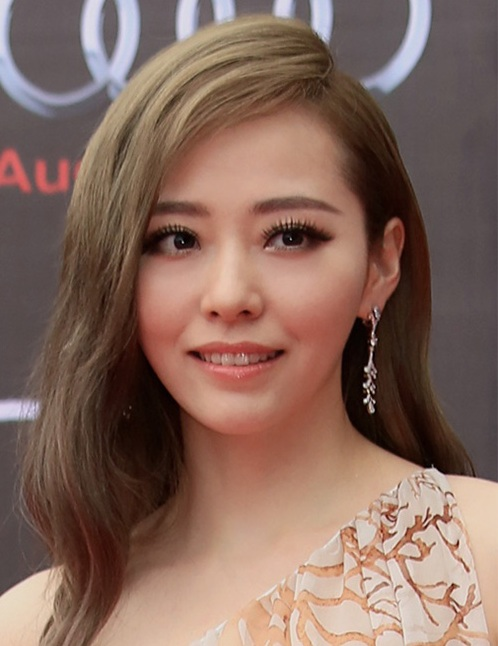
- Zhang at the QQ Music Annual Festival, 2015
Awards and nominations
Award	Wins	Nominations
Asia Music Chart Awards	1	1
Asia Song Festival	1	1
Baidu Entertainment Boiling Point	5	6
Beijing Pop Music Awards	22	48
Billboard Radio China Awards	1	1
BQ Weekly Awards	0	2
Budweiser Real Character Awards	1	1
Canada's Best Chinese Hits Chart Awards	1	1
CCTV Investigation Report of Chinese Entertainment Circle	0	5
CCTV-MTV Music Awards	0	2
CCTV-15 Global Chinese Music Top 10 Awards	1	1
China Fashion Awards	1	1
China Gold Record Awards	2	2
China Green Foundation Awards Ceremony	1	1
China Music Awards	7	7
China Trends Awards	1	1
Chinese Music Awards	4	4
Chinese Music Media Awards	3	3
Chinese Original Music Salute Awards	1	1
CNTV's Music King Hit Global Chinese Music Award	1	1
Cosmopolitan Beauty Awards	1	1
CSC Music Awards	2	2
Entertainment Awards	1	1
ERS Chinese Top Ten Awards	16	16
Fashion Weekly Magazine Awards Ceremony	3	3
Five-One Project Awards	2	2
Forbes China Celebrity List Awards	1	1
Forbes China Celebrity List Charity Awards	1	1
Global Chinese Golden Chart Awards	1	1
Global Chinese Pop Chart Awards	28	28
Golden Bauhinia Awards	1	1
Golden Melody Awards	0	1
Green China Awards Ceremony	1	1
Hello Asia! C-Pop Awards	0	1
Her Village International Forum Awards Ceremony	1	1
Hong Kong Film Awards	1	2
Huading Awards	0	4
Huaxi Urban Newspaper Annual Music Awards	3	3
International Charity Forum Awards Ceremony	1	1
iQiyi Awards Ceremony	1	1
Lifestyle Magazine Awards Ceremony	4	4
Metro Radio Mandarin Hits Music Awards	6	6
Migu Music Awards	19	19
Mnet Asian Music Awards	1	1
MTV Europe Music Awards	2	4
MTV Global Mandarin Music Awards	0	1
MTV Style Awards	2	2
MusicRadio China Top Chart Awards	1	13
New Weekly's China Pride Annual List	0	1
New York Chinese Film Festival	1	1
Outstanding Contribution to Chengdu City Awards	1	1
PETA's Sexiest Vegetarian Celebrity	1	1
QQ Music Awards	7	7
ROI Festival Awards	1	1
RTHK Top 10 Gold Songs Awards	2	5
Sina.com Internet Awards	2	2
Sina Music Awards	1	1
Sina Women's Fashion List Awards Ceremony	1	1
Singapore Hit Awards	2	2
Southeast Music Chart Awards1	2	0
Southern Metropolis Entertainment Weekly's Star Citizens Awards Ceremony	1	1
Southern People Weekly's Youth Leadership	0	5
Sprite Music Chart Awards	10	10
Tencent Star Awards	4	4
Top Chinese Music Awards	4	14
Top 10 Attractive Women in China	1	1
TOM Online Honor Awards	0	1
Tudou Young Choice Awards	1	1
TVB8 Mandarin Music on Demand Awards	1	1
V Chart Awards	4	4
Weibo Awards Ceremony	2	2
Weibo Movie Awards Ceremony	1	1
Wyndham Xingyue Role Model Ceremony	1	1
9+2 Music Pioneer Awards	2	2

Totals (Note: Certain award groups do not simply award one winner. They acknowledge several different recipients, have runners-up, and have third place. Since this is a specific recognition and is different from losing an award, runner-up mentions are considered wins in this award tally. For simplification and to avoid errors, each award in this list has been presumed to have had a prior nomination.)
- Wins: 206
- Nominations: 285 (Note: Awards in certain categories do not have prior nominations and only winners are announced by the jury. For simplification and to avoid errors, each award in this list has been presumed to have had a prior nomination.)

Jane Zhang (Chinese: 张靓颖; pinyin: Zhāng Liàngyǐng; born October 11, 1984), is a Chinese singer-songwriter. She is one of the Chinese's leading contemporary recording artists. Known for her signature whistle register, she was dubbed the "Dolphin Princess".

== Asia Music Chart Awards ==
Year	Nominee/work	Award	Result	Ref.
2014	Jane Zhang	Most Outstanding Female Singer	Won	

== Asia Song Festival ==
Year	Nominee/work	Award	Result	Ref.
2010	Jane Zhang	Most Outstanding Singer in Asia	Won	

== Baidu Entertainment Boiling Point ==
Year	Nominee/work	Award	Result	Ref.
2009	Jane Zhang	Hottest Female Singer (Mainland China)	Won	
2009	Painted Heart	Top 10 Gold Songs in Mainland China	Won	
2009	Painted Heart	Most Popular Film Song	Won	
2010	Jane Zhang	Hottest Female Singer (Mainland China)	Nominated	
2011	If This is Love	Top 10 Gold Songs in Mainland China	Won	
2012	Jane Zhang	Baidu Music's Most Popular Female Singer of the Decade	Won	

== Beijing Pop Music Awards ==
Year	Nominee/work	Award	Result	Ref.
2007	Jane Zhang	Best Female Singer (Mainland China)	Won	
2007	Jane Zhang	Most Popular Female Singer (Mainland China)	Nominated	
2007	Jane Zhang	Most Popular New Singer	Nominated	
2007	Only Love	Songs of the Year	Won	
2008	Jane Zhang	Best Female Singer (Mainland China)	Won	
2008	Jane Zhang	Most Popular Female Singer (Mainland China)	Nominated	
2008	Jane Zhang	Best Stage Performance Female	Nominated	
2008	Update	Best Album	Nominated	
2008	We Said	KTV's Most Popular Song	Won	
2008	We Said	Songs of the Year	Won	
2009	Jane Zhang	Best Female Singer (Mainland China)	Won	
2009	Jane Zhang	Most Popular Female Singer (Mainland China)	Nominated	
2009	Jane Zhang	Best Stage Performance Female	Nominated	
2009	Painted Heart	KTV's Most Popular Song	Won	
2009	Painted Heart	Songs of the Year	Won	
2009	One World, One Dream	Songs of the Year	Nominated	
2010	Jane Zhang	Best Female Singer (Mainland China)	Won	
2010	Jane Zhang	Most Popular Female Singer (Mainland China)	Nominated	
2010	Jane Zhang	Best Stage Performance Female	Nominated	
2010	Jane@Music	Best Album	Nominated	
2010	Mulan Star	Songs of the Year	Won	
2010	I Love This City	Songs of the Year	Nominated	
2010	Could That Be Love?	Songs of the Year	Nominated	
2010	Eyes of Children	Songs of the Year	Nominated	
2011	Jane Zhang	Best Female Singer (Mainland China)	Won	
2011	Jane Zhang	Most Popular Female Singer (Mainland China)	Nominated	
2011	Jane Zhang	Best Stage Performance Female	Nominated	
2011	Believe in Jane	Best Album	Won	
2011	If This is Love	Songs of the Year	Won	
2012	Jane Zhang	Best Female Singer (Mainland China)	Won	
2012	Jane Zhang	Most Popular Female Singer (Mainland China)	Nominated	
2012	Jane Zhang	Best Stage Performance Female	Nominated	
2012	Reform	Best Album	Nominated	
2012	Just Love	Songs of the Year	Won	
2012	Unspeakable Love	Songs of the Year	Won	
2012	Jane Zhang	Best Female Singer (Mainland China)	Won	
2012	Jane Zhang	Most Popular Female Singer (Mainland China)	Nominated	
2012	Jane Zhang	Best Stage Performance Female	Nominated	
2012	Listen to Jane Z Live	Best Album	Won	
2012	Not So Easy	Songs of the Year	Won	
2018	Jane Zhang	Best Female Singer (Mainland China)	Won	
2018	Jane Zhang	Most Popular Female Singer (Mainland China)	Nominated	
2018	Jane Zhang	Best Stage Performance Female	Won	
2018	Jane Zhang	Media Recommends Female Singer	Nominated	
2018	Ten Miles of Peach Blossom	Most Popular Film Song	Nominated	
2018	Me	Songs of the Year	Won	

== Billboard Radio China Awards ==
Year	Nominee/work	Award	Result	Ref.
2017	Make it Big	Top 10 Chinese Songs of the Year	Won	

== BQ Weekly Awards ==
Year	Nominee/work	Award	Result	Ref.
2007	Jane Zhang	Most Popular Female Singer	Nominated	
2010	Jane Zhang	Popular Musical Character	Nominated	

== Budweiser Real Character Awards ==
Year	Nominee/work	Award	Result	Ref.
2016	Jane Zhang	Real Character Award	Won	

== Canada's Best Chinese Hits Chart Awards ==
Year	Nominee/work	Award	Result	Ref.
2009	Jane Zhang	Mandarin Female Singer	Won	

== CCTV Investigation Report of Chinese Entertainment Circle ==
Year	Nominee/work	Award	Result	Ref.
2008	Jane Zhang	Best Female Singer (Mainland China)	Nominated	
2008	Jane Zhang	Most Popular Female Star	Nominated	
2008	Painted Heart	Best Single / EP (Mainland China)	Nominated	
2008	Painted Heart	Best Film Song	Nominated	
2008	Heroes	Best Film Song	Nominated	

== CCTV-MTV Music Awards ==
Year	Nominee/work	Award	Result	Ref.
2012	Jane Zhang	Best Female Singer (Mainland China)	Nominated	
2012	Reform	Best music TV (Mainland China)	Nominated	

== CCTV-15 Global Chinese Music Top 10 Awards ==
Year	Nominee/work	Award	Result	Ref.
2018	Jane Zhang	Best Female Singer	Won	

== China Fashion Awards ==
Year	Nominee/work	Award	Result	Ref.
2009	Jane Zhang	Outstanding Music Pioneer	Won	

== China Gold Record Awards ==
Year	Nominee/work	Award	Result	Ref.
2007	Jane Zhang	Best Pop Female	Won	
2012	Jane Zhang	Most Popular Female Singer	Won	

== China Green Foundation Awards Ceremony ==
Year	Nominee/work	Award	Result	Ref.
2012	Jane Zhang	Eco-China Public Welfare Outstanding Person Award	Won	

== China Music Awards ==
Year	Nominee/work	Award	Result	Ref.
2006	Jane Zhang	Highest Annual Search Volume at Yahoo	Won	
2010	Jane Zhang	Best Female Singer (Mainland China)	Won	
2011	Jane Zhang	Best Female Singer (Mainland China)	Won	
2012	Jane Zhang	Best Female Singer (Mainland China)	Won	
2012	Unspeakable Love	Top 10 Hits	Won	
2017	Jane Zhang	Best Female Singer (Mainland China)	Won	
2017	Jane Zhang	Asia's Most Influential Female Singer	Won	

== China Trends Awards ==
Year	Nominee/work	Award	Result	Ref.
2010	Jane Zhang	Best Dress Award	Won	

== Chinese Music Awards ==
Year	Nominee/work	Award	Result	Ref.
2011	Jane Zhang	Favorite Female Singer	Won	
2011	If This is Love	Top 10 Mandarin Songs	Won	
2015	The Seventh Sense	Top 10 Mandarin Albums	Won	
2015	Inscriptionless Stele	Top 10 Mandarin Songs	Won	

== Chinese Music Media Awards ==
Year	Nominee/work	Award	Result	Ref.
2009	Jane Zhang	100 Media's Most Watched Female Singer	Won	
2013	Jane Zhang	Favorite Female Singer	Won	
2013	Jane Zhang	100 Media's Most Watched Female Singer	Won	

== Chinese Original Music Salute Awards ==
Year	Nominee/work	Award	Result	Ref.
2015	Jane Zhang	Annual Tribute Female Singer	Won	

== CNTV's Music King Hit Global Chinese Music Award ==
Year	Nominee/work	Award	Result	Ref.
2015	Jane Zhang	Favorite Female Singer	Won	

== Cosmopolitan Beauty Awards ==
Year	Nominee/work	Award	Result	Ref.
2008	Jane Zhang	Fashion Musician of the Year	Won	

== CSC Music Awards ==
Year	Nominee/work	Award	Result	Ref.
2015	Jane Zhang	Best Female Singer	Won	
2015	Make it Big	Top 20 Hits	Won	

== Entertainment Awards ==
Year	Nominee/work	Award	Result	Ref.
2011	Jane Zhang	Most Influential Female Singer	Won	

== ERS Chinese Top Ten Awards ==
Year	Nominee/work	Award	Result	Ref.
2009	Jane Zhang	Best Female Singer (Mainland China)	Won	
2009	Heroes	Top 10 Hits	Won	
2010	Jane Zhang	Best Female Singer (Mainland China)	Won	
2010	Mulan Star	Top 10 Hits	Won	
2011	Jane Zhang	Best Female Singer (Mainland China)	Won	
2011	If This is Love	Top 10 Hits	Won	
2013	Jane Zhang	Best Female Singer (Mainland China)	Won	
2013	Jane Zhang	Achievement Award (Twenty years)	Won	
2013	Not So Easy	Top 10 Hits	Won	
2014	Finally Wait Till You	Top 10 Hits	Won	
2015	I'll Be with You to the End	Top 10 Hits	Won	
2016	Swallows Nest	FM101.7's Annual Song	Won	
2017	Jane Zhang	Best Female Singer (Mainland China)	Won	
2017	You Must Be Happy	Top 10 Hits	Won	
2017	No possibility	Best Duet Song	Won	
2018	Me	Top 10 Hits	Won	

== Fashion Weekly Magazine Awards Ceremony ==
Year	Nominee/work	Award	Result	Ref.
2008	Jane Zhang	Best Female Singer	Won	
2009	Jane Zhang	Best Female Singer	Won	
2011	Jane Zhang	Best Female Singer	Won	

== Five-One Project Awards ==
Year	Nominee/work	Award	Result	Ref.
2009	Impression of the West Lake	Outstanding Work Award (Hangzhou City)	Won	
2009	I Love This City	Outstanding Work Award (Sichuan Province)	Won	

== Forbes China Celebrity List Awards ==
Year	Nominee/work	Award	Result	Ref.
2006	Jane Zhang	Most Commercial Potential Star	Won	

== Forbes China Celebrity List Charity Awards ==
Year	Nominee/work	Award	Result	Ref.
2008	Jane Zhang	Female Artist Concerned by the Media	Won	

== Global Chinese Golden Chart Awards ==
Year	Nominee/work	Award	Result	Ref.
2011	I Believe	Top 20 Golden Songs of the Year	Won	

== Global Chinese Pop Chart Awards ==
Year	Nominee/work	Award	Result	Ref.
2006	Jane Zhang	Best Stage Performance Award	Won	
2007	Jane Zhang	Best Stage Performance Award	Won	
2007	Jane Zhang	Top 5 Most Popular Female Singers	Won	
2007	Jane Zhang	Outstanding Singer (Beijing Region)	Won	
2007	We Said	Top 20 Hits	Won	
2009	Jane Zhang	Top 5 Most Popular Female Singers	Won	
2009	Jane Zhang	Outstanding Singer (Beijing Region)	Won	
2009	Jane Zhang	Outstanding Singer from Seven Radio Stations	Won	
2009	Another Heaven	Most Popular Duet Song	Won	
2009	Could That Be Love?	Top 20 Hits	Won	
2010	Jane Zhang	Top 5 Most Popular Female Singers	Won	
2010	Jane Zhang	Outstanding Singer (Beijing Region)	Won	
2010	Jane Zhang	Best Female Singer	Won	
2010	Believe in Jane	Beat Album	Won	
2010	Can't Do It	Most Popular Duet Song	Won	
2010	If This is Love	Top 20 Hits	Won	
2011	Jane Zhang	Top 5 Most Popular Female Singers	Won	
2011	Reform	Top 20 Hits	Won	
2012	Not So Easy	Top 20 Hits	Won	
2013	Autumn Odor	Twenty Most Popular Songs	Won	
2014	Jane Zhang	Top 5 Most Popular Female Singers	Won	
2015	Jane Zhang	Top 5 Most Popular Female Singers	Won	
2015	Swallows Nest	Most Popular Duet Song	Won	
2016	Jane Zhang	Top 5 Most Popular Female Singers	Won	
2016	No possibility	Most Popular Duet Song	Won	
2018	Jane Zhang	Top 5 Most Popular Female Singers	Won	
2018	Jane Zhang	Outstanding Singer (Beijing Region)	Won	
2018	You Must Be Happy	Top 20 Hits	Won	

== Golden Bauhinia Awards ==
Year	Nominee/work	Award	Result	Ref.
2007	Only Love	Best Film Song	Won	

== Golden Melody Awards ==
Year	Nominee/work	Award	Result	Ref.
2017	Dust My Shoulders Off	Best Music Video	Nominated	

== Green China Awards Ceremony ==
Year	Nominee/work	Award	Result	Ref.
2017	Jane Zhang	Annual Focus People Award	Won	

== Hello Asia! C-Pop Awards ==
Year	Nominee/work	Award	Result	Ref.
2016	Dust My Shoulders Off	Best Single	Nominated	

== Her Village International Forum Awards Ceremony ==
Year	Nominee/work	Award	Result	Ref.
2017	Jane Zhang	Creative Women Award	Won	

== Hong Kong Film Awards ==
Year	Nominee/work	Award	Result	Ref.
2007	Only Love	Best Original Film Song	Nominated	
2009	Painted Heart	Best Original Film Song	Won	

== Huading Awards ==
Year	Nominee/work	Award	Result	Ref.
2008	Jane Zhang	Best Performance Female Singer in China	Nominated	
2010	Jane Zhang	Best Theme Song Singer	Nominated	
2012	Jane Zhang	The Best Female Singer in China	Nominated	
2013	Jane Zhang	Best Chinese Female Singer	Nominated	

== Huaxi Urban Newspaper Annual Music Awards ==
Year	Nominee/work	Award	Result	Ref.
2015	If This Is Love	Top 10 Best-selling Songs of the Year	Won	
2018	Jane Zhang	Most Popular Female Singer (Mainland China)	Won	
2018	Song of Phoenix	Top 10 Hits	Won	

== International Charity Forum Awards Ceremony ==
Year	Nominee/work	Award	Result	Ref.
2008	Jane Zhang	Charity Celebrity Award	Won	

== iQIYI Awards Ceremony ==
Year	Nominee/work	Award	Result	Ref.
2012	Jane Zhang	Best Female Singer	Won	

== Lifestyle Magazine Awards Ceremony ==
Year	Nominee/work	Award	Result	Ref.
2007	Jane Zhang	Influential Star	Won	
2007	Jane Zhang	New Powerful Star	Won	
2008	Jane Zhang	Cover Stars of the 15 Years	Won	
2008	Jane Zhang	New Pop star	Won	

== Metro Radio Mandarin Hits Music Awards ==
Year	Nominee/work	Award	Result	Ref.
2007	Jane Zhang	Outstanding Singer (Mainland China)	Won	
2007	Jane Zhang	Mandarin Force Female Singer	Won	
2010	Jane Zhang	Mandarin Force Asian Singer	Won	
2010	Believe in Jane	Mandarin Force Album	Won	
2011	Jane Zhang	Mandarin Force National Most Popular Singer	Won	
2011	Reform	Mandarin Force Album	Won	

== Migu Music Awards ==
Year	Nominee/work	Award	Result	Ref.
2007	Jane Zhang	Special Recommendation Award (Mainland China)	Won	
2007	Jane Zhang	Annual Contribution Award	Won	
2007	Jane Zhang	Leap of the Year Award	Won	
2008	Jane Zhang	Super Popular Female Singer	Won	
2009	Jane Zhang	Super Popular Female Singer	Won	
2011	Jane Zhang	Super Popular Female Singer	Won	
2012	Jane Zhang	Best Singer of the Year	Won	
2012	Beauty and Bravery	Best-selling duet songs in the Year	Won	
2013	Jane Zhang	Best Popular Female Singer	Won	
2013	Jane Zhang	Most Popular Female Singer (Mainland China)	Won	
2014	Jane Zhang	Most Influential Female Singer	Won	
2014	Jane Zhang	Most Popular Female Singer (Mainland China)	Won	
2015	Jane Zhang	Most Popular Female Singer (Mainland China)	Won	
2016	Jane Zhang	Most Breakthrough Singer	Won	
2016	Jane Zhang	Best Sales Singer of Mobile CRBT in ten Years	Won	
2016	If This is Love	Salable Hits of Top 10 in ten Years	Won	
2016	My Dream	Top 10 Hits in the Year	Won	
2017	Jane Zhang	Most Popular Female Singer (Mainland China)	Won	
2017	Song of Phoenix	Top 10 Hits in the Year	Won	

== Mnet Asian Music Awards ==
Year	Nominee/work	Award	Result	Ref.
2011	Jane Zhang	Best Asian Artist	Won	

== MTV Europe Music Awards ==
Year	Nominee/work	Award	Result	Ref.
2011	Jane Zhang	Best Worldwide Act	Nominated	
2013	Jane Zhang	Best Worldwide Act	Nominated	
2015	Jane Zhang	Best World Act of the Asia	Won	
2015	Jane Zhang	Best Mainland China & Hong Kong Act	Won	

== MTV Global Mandarin Music Awards ==
Year	Nominee/work	Award	Result	Ref.
2017	Jane Zhang	Most Popular Female Singer	Nominated	

== MTV Style Awards ==
Year	Nominee/work	Award	Result	Ref.
2005	Jane Zhang	Most Stylish New Force in the Performing Arts Circle	Won	
2009	Jane Zhang	Most Stylish Female Singer (Mainland China)	Won	

== MusicRadio China Top Chart Awards ==
Year	Nominee/work	Award	Result	Ref.
2007	This Damned Thing Called Love	Radio on-demand Championship Song	Won	
2008	Jane Zhang	Best Female Singer (Mainland China)	Nominated	
2008	Jane Zhang	Most Popular Female Singer (Mainland China)	Nominated	
2009	Jane Zhang	Most Popular Female Singer (Mainland China)	Nominated	
2010	Jane Zhang	Best Female Singer (Mainland China)	Nominated	
2010	Jane Zhang	Most Popular Female Singer (Mainland China)	Nominated	
2012	Jane Zhang	Most Popular Female Singer (Mainland China)	Nominated	
2012	Reform	Most Popular Album	Nominated	
2013	Jane Zhang	Best Female Singer (Mainland China)	Nominated	
2013	Jane Zhang	Most Popular Female Singer (Mainland China)	Nominated	
2013	Listen to Jane Z Live	Most Popular Album	Nominated	
2014	Jane Zhang	Most Popular Female Singer	Nominated	
2014	The Seventh Sense	Most Popular Album	Nominated	

== New Weekly's China Pride Annual List ==
Year	Nominee/work	Award	Result	Ref.
2006	Jane Zhang	Artist of the Year	Nominated	

== New York Chinese Film Festival ==
Year	Nominee/work	Award	Result	Ref.
2010	Jane Zhang	Asia's Most Popular Artist	Won	

== Outstanding Contribution to Chengdu City Awards ==
Year	Nominee/work	Award	Result	Ref.
2010	Jane Zhang	Outstanding Contribution to Chengdu City Award	Won	

== PETA's Sexiest Vegetarian Celebrity ==
Year	Nominee/work	Award	Result	Ref.
2010	Jane Zhang	Most Sexiest Vegetarian Celebrity in Asia	Won	

== QQ Music Awards ==
Year	Nominee/work	Award	Result	Ref.
2014	Jane Zhang	Best Female Singer (Mainland China)	Won	
2014	Jane Zhang	Most Popular Female Singer (Mainland China)	Won	
2015	Jane Zhang	Best Female Singer (Mainland China)	Won	
2015	Jane Zhang	Most Influential Concert	Won	
2015	Jane Zhang	Most Breakthrough Artist	Won	
2016	Jane Zhang	Most Popular Female Singer (Mainland China)	Won	
2016	Jane Zhang	Best Stage Performance	Won	

== ROI Festival Awards ==
Year	Nominee/work	Award	Result	Ref.
2013	Jane Zhang	Most Commercially Valuable Female Artist	Won	

== RTHK Top 10 Gold Songs Awards ==
Year	Nominee/work	Award	Result	Ref.
2008	Jane Zhang	National Best Female	Nominated	
2009	Jane Zhang	National Best Female	Nominated	
2010	Jane Zhang	National Best Female	Nominated	
2013	Jane Zhang	National Best Female	Won	
2018	Jane Zhang	National Best Female	Won	

== Sina.com Internet Awards ==
Year	Nominee/work	Award	Result	Ref.
2006	Jane Zhang	Most Popular New Icon	Won	
2007	Only Love	Film Songs of The Year	Won	

== Sina Music Awards ==
Year	Nominee/work	Award	Result	Ref.
2008	Jane Zhang	Favorite Female Singer in China	Won	

== Sina Women's Fashion List Awards Ceremony ==
Year	Nominee/work	Award	Result	Ref.
2007	Jane Zhang	Most International Music Style Award	Won	

== Singapore Hit Awards ==
Year	Nominee/work	Award	Result	Ref.
2008	Jane Zhang	Most Outstanding Singer (Mainland China)	Won	
2010	Jane Zhang	Most Outstanding Singer (Mainland China)	Won	

== Southeast Music Chart Awards ==
Year	Nominee/work	Award	Result	Ref.
2009	Jane Zhang	Most Popular Female Singer	Nominated	
2010	If This is Love	Top 10 Hits	Won	

== Southern Metropolis Entertainment Weekly's Star Citizens Awards Ceremony ==
Year	Nominee/work	Award	Result	Ref.
2012	Jane Zhang	Star Citizens Award	Won	

== Southern People Weekly's Youth Leadership ==
Year	Nominee/work	Award	Result	Ref.
2007	Jane Zhang	Young Leaders in the star field	Nominated	
2008	Jane Zhang	Young Leaders in the star field	Nominated	
2009	Jane Zhang	Young Leaders in the star field	Nominated	
2010	Jane Zhang	Young Leaders in the star field	Nominated	
2011	Jane Zhang	Young Leaders in the star field	Nominated	

== Sprite Music Chart Awards ==
Year	Nominee/work	Award	Result	Ref.
2007	Jane Zhang	Best Performance Singer	Won	
2008	Dream Party	Golden songs (Mainland China)	Won	
2008	Jane Zhang	Favorite Female Singer (Mainland China)	Won	
2010	Jane Zhang	Best Female Singer (Mainland China)	Won	
2010	Jane Zhang	Media Recommendation Award	Won	
2011	Jane Zhang	Favorite Female Singer (Mainland China)	Won	
2011	Jane Zhang	Media Recommendation Award	Won	
2012	Just Love	Golden songs (Mainland China)	Won	
2012	Jane Zhang	Best Female Singer (Mainland China)	Won	
2012	Jane Zhang	Media Recommendation Award	Won	

== Tencent Star Awards ==
Year	Nominee/work	Award	Result	Ref.
2006	Just Relax	Top 10 Hits	Won	
2007	Jane Zhang	Favorite Female Singer (Mainland China)	Won	
2007	Update	Most Popular Album (Mainland China)	Won	
2010	Jane Zhang	Best Female Singer (Mainland China)	Won	

== Top Chinese Music Awards ==
Year	Nominee/work	Award	Result	Ref.
2007	Jane Zhang	Best Female Singer (Mainland China)	Nominated	
2007	Jane Zhang	Best New Singer	Nominated	
2007	The One	Best Album	Nominated	
2007	Only Love	Best Film Song	Nominated	
2008	Jane Zhang	Best Female Singer (Mainland China)	Nominated	
2008	Update	Best Album	Nominated	
2009	Jane Zhang	Best Female Singer (Mainland China)	Nominated	
2010	Jane Zhang	New Force Female Singer (Mainland China)	Won	
2010	Painted Heart	Ten Golden Songs in 10 Years	Won	
2011	Jane Zhang	Best Female Singer (Mainland China)	Nominated	
2011	Believe in Jane	Best Album	Nominated	
2011	If This is Love	Best Song (Mainland China)	Nominated	
2013	Jane Zhang	Best Female Singer	Won	
2013	Jane Zhang	Favorite Female Singer (Mainland China)	Won	

== Top 10 Attractive Women in China ==
Year	Nominee/work	Award	Result	Ref.
2006	Jane Zhang	Pure and Attractive Woman	Won	

== TOM Online Honor Award ==
Year	Nominee/work	Award	Result	Ref.
2006	The One	Most Popular Music Album	Nominated	

== Tudou Young Choice Awards ==
Year	Nominee/work	Award	Result	Ref.
2014	Jane Zhang	Most Popular Female Singer	Won	

== TVB8 Mandarin Music on Demand Awards ==
Year	Nominee/work	Award	Result	Ref.
2007	Jane Zhang	Favorite Female Singer (Mainland China)	Won	

== V Chart Awards ==
Year	Nominee/work	Award	Result	Ref.
2013	Jane Zhang	Best Female Singer	Won	
2013	Listen to Jane Z Live	Best Album	Won	
2015	Jane Zhang	Best Female Singer	Won	
2015	The Seventh Sense	Best Album	Won	

== Weibo Awards Ceremony ==
Year	Nominee/work	Award	Result	Ref.
2012	Jane Zhang	Weibo's Most Influential Female Singer	Won	
2017	Jane Zhang	Weibo's Most Powerful Singer	Won	
2019	Jane Zhang	Weibo's Annual influential singer	Won	

== Weibo Movie Awards Ceremony ==
Year	Nominee/work	Award	Result	Ref.
2016	Jane Zhang	Weibo's Best Soundtrack Female Singer	Won	

== Wyndham Xingyue Role Model Ceremony ==
Year	Nominee/work	Award	Result	Ref.
2014	Jane Zhang	Most Powerful Female Singer	Won	

== 9+2 Music Pioneer Awards ==
Year	Nominee/work	Award	Result	Ref.
2006	Jane Zhang	Best Pioneer Female singer	Won	
2006	Light	Top 10 Pioneer Songs of the Year	Won	
