= Jane's Appearance Tour =

2011–12 concert tour by Jane Zhang

- Tour by Jane Zhang
- Associated album: Reform
- Start date: October 29, 2011
- End date: November 23, 2012
- Legs: 2
- No. of shows: 6 in Asia; 2 in North America; 8 total

Jane's Appearance Tour was the third concert tour by singer Jane Zhang, in support of her fifth studio album, Reform.

== Background ==
As the queen of the mainland, Jane Zhang debuted in six years and set a proud music score. She launched two popular albums, "Believe in Jane" and "Reform", and won the best female singer of the Beijing Pop Music Award five times. She was shortlisted for the 2011 MTV European Music Awards and held 15 individual concerts. "My Appearance Tour" is a performance by Jane Zhang to fans. Jane said that "My Appearance Tour" is a summary of her past six years of music history, including popular songs that are familiar to people, and some English songs that are covered.

== Shows ==
List of concerts, showing date, city, country, venue, opening acts, tickets sold, number of available tickets and amount of gross revenue
Date	City	Country	Venue
October 29, 2011	Shanghai	China	Mercedes-Benz Arena
November 11, 2011	Chengdu	China	Sichuan Provincial Gymnasium
November 26, 2011	Beijing	China	MasterCard Center
December 9, 2011	Guangzhou	China	Tianhe Sports Gymnasium
September 15, 2012	Singapore		Singapore Indoor Stadium
November 9, 2012	Shenzhen	China	Shenzhen Bay Sport Center Gymnasium
November 22, 2012	Uncasville	United States	Mohegan Sun Arena
November 23, 2012	Uncasville	United States	Mohegan Sun Arena
Total
