= Dust My Shoulders Off =

Single by Jane Zhang featuring Timbaland

from the album Past Progressive
- Released: October 14, 2016
- Genre: R&B
- Length: 3:50
- Label: Montage
- Songwriters: Jane Zhang; Timothy Mosley; Christopher Godbey; Jocelyn Donald; Trinity Home; James Washington
- Producers: Jim Beanz; Michael Feng; Timbaland

Timbaland singles chronology
"Smile" (2015)	"Dust My Shoulders Off" (2016)	"?" (?)

Music video
- "Dust My Shoulders Off" on YouTube

"Dust My Shoulders Off" is a song by Chinese singer and songwriter Jane Zhang. It features American producer Timbaland, and was released on October 14, 2016, through Montage Records. It was included on Zhang's first English-language studio album, Past Progressive (2019).

== Critical reception ==
Jennifer Dill of E! Online said "The song tells the story of someone who may be having a rough day but who quickly decides to 'dust her shoulders off' in swaggy fashion. It features a catchy beat and a heartening don't-sweat-the-small-stuff vibe." PopCrush's Bradley Stern stated "The fresh and breezy, feel-good ode to sh-sh-shaking off the blues, gliding across folk-y harmonies recalling Oh Land and Timba and Jim Beanz’s knocking hip-hop beats, really doesn’t sound like anything on radio right now. 'The world keeps spinning, life goes on and on / I won’t cry for long' she confidently croons across the quirky and carefree production, shrugging off all of life’s little inconveniences. It's no secret that breaking into the American market in a big way is still an all-but-impossible feat for any Asian act — from any country. (Sad, but true.) We're inching there at a snail's pace with acts like Utada and CL, and BTS just notched the highest Korean-language debut on the Billboard 200 yet this week, but to see Jane riding high on the Top 10 out of nowhere is an absolute unexpected delight: it's not only a massive victory for C-Pop, but for the Asian music market as a whole. Here's hoping this is only the start of Jane's US success story."

== Music video ==
On October 21, 2016, a 34-second teaser of the video was revealed. The music video, directed by Outerspace Leo, was released on October 28, 2016.

Eleven famous paintings are recreated and reenacted for this music video:

1. Edward Hopper "Nighthawks" (1942)
2. Vincent van Gogh "Self-portrait" (1889)
  - in which van Gogh is bitten in his ear by Mike Tyson
3. Jean-François Millet "The Gleaners" (1857)
4. Johannes Vermeer "Girl with a Pearl Earring" (c. 1665)
5. Andrew Wyeth "Christina's World" (1948)
6. Georges Seurat "A Sunday Afternoon on the Island of La Grande Jatte" (1884)
7. Edvard Munch "The Scream" (1893)
  - in which the screamer's memory is erased by the Men in Black
8. Salvador Dalí "The Temptation of St. Anthony" (1946)
9. Maurits Cornelis Escher "Ascending and Descending" (1960)
10. Maurits Cornelis Escher "Another World Gallery"(1946)
11. René Magritte "The Son of Man" (1964)
  - in which the Son of Man transforms to Salvador Dalí

== Live performances ==
In November 2017, Jane Zhang performed "Dust My Shoulders Off" at the Victoria's Secret Fashion Show in Shanghai, China, along with "Work for It" and "808".

== Track listing ==
Digital download / Streaming
No.	Title	Length
1.	"Dust My Shoulders Off" (featuring Timbaland)	3:50

== Accolades ==
Year	Organization	Award	Result	Ref.
2016	Hello Asia! C-Pop Awards	Best Single	Nominated	
2017	Red Dot Design Award	Best of the Best	Won	
2017	Golden Melody Awards	Best Music Video	Nominated	
2017	ADC Annual Awards	Motion / Music Video: Bronze Cube	Won	
2017	London International Awards	Music Video / Animation：Bronze	Won	

== Charts ==
Chart (2016)	Peak position
US Digital Songs (Billboard)	31

== Release history ==
Region	Date	Format	Label	Ref.
Worldwide	October 14, 2016	Digital download	Montage	

== Trivia ==
- The song has been used on various Hulu commercials.
