= The One (Jane Zhang album) =

Studio album by Jane Zhang
- Released: October 11, 2006
- Genre: Pop
- Label: Huayi Brothers

Jane Zhang chronology
Jane, Love (2006)	The One (2006)	Update (2007)

The One is the first studio album by Chinese singer Jane Zhang, released on October 11, 2006 by Huayi Brothers.

== Track listing ==
1. Body Language (Chinese: 身体语言) (4:15)
2. This Damned Thing Called Love (Chinese: 这该死的爱) (4:57)
3. Take It Like a Man (3:49)
4. If We Keep Loving (Chinese: 如果爱下去) (4:02)
5. Can't Take It Back (3:13)
6. Private Matter (Chinese: 个人秘密) (4:11)
7. Missing You, at 0:01 (Chinese: 想你，零点零一分) (4:12)
8. Blockhead (Chinese: 木脑壳) (3:48)
9. Girl of Your Dreams (3:54)
10. Midnight, Goodnight (4:28)
