= Xu Wei (musician) =

Chinese rock musician (born 1968)

Xu Wei 许巍
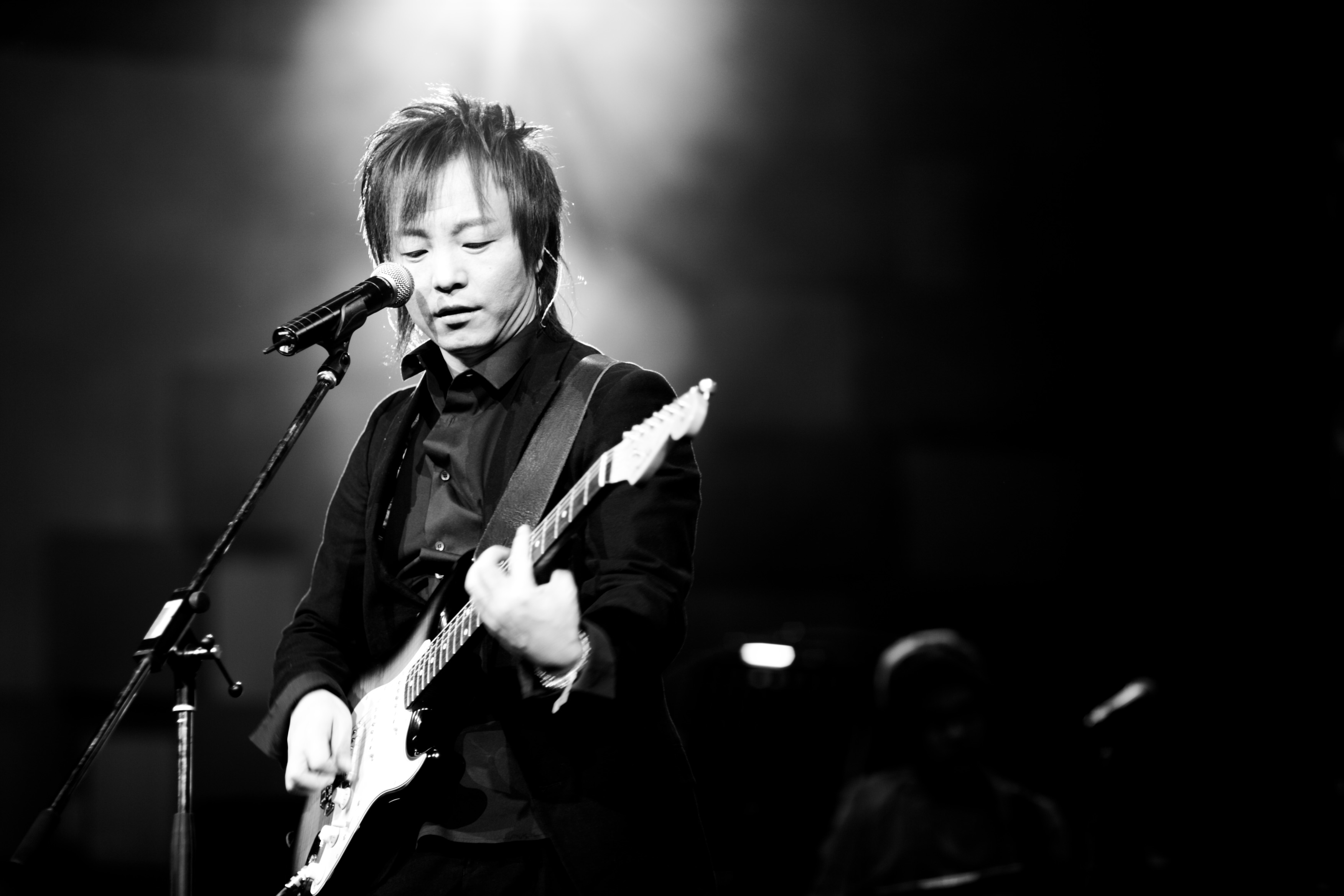
- Xu Wei at a concert in 2007

Background information
- Born: 21 July 1968 (age 57); Xi'an, Shaanxi, China
- Origin: Xi'an, China
- Occupation: Singer
- Years active: 1986–present

Xu Wei (Simplified Chinese: 许巍, pinyin:Xǔ Wēi; born 21 July 1968) is a Chinese rock musician. He was born and raised in the Pangliu village, near Xi'an.

Xu Wei began learning to play the guitar at the age of sixteen, when he started high school. In April 1986, he attended the first guitar-singing competition in Xi'an, and won first prize. After writing his first song, Xu abandoned university entrance exams to pursue a career in music.

At the end of 1987, Xu Wei joined the People's Liberation Army, working in the arts troupe of Shaanxi military region. In 1988, he came into contact with rock music for the first time. The following year, he was offered entry into the Fourth Military Medical University but turned down the opportunity. During the three years in the army, Xu taught himself to compose music and write songs, producing several pop songs.

Xu Wei left the army in the winter of 1990. In 1993 he organised the band Fly (飞). He still participates in the composition of rock music, but his style has been influenced by pop music.

== See also ==
- Chinese rock
