= 808 (Jane Zhang song) =

Single by Jane Zhang

from the album Past Progressive
- Language: English; Mandarin
- Released: November 21, 2017
- Genre: EDM
- Length: 3:00
- Label: Show City Times
- Songwriters: Jim Beanz; Candice Nelson; Jane Zhang; Jack Novak
- Producers: King Logan Royal Court Productions; J-Vu; Side by Side Entertainment; Keyz

Jane Zhang English singles chronology
"Dust My Shoulders Off" (2016)	"808" (2017)	"Work for It" (2018)

Audio video
- "808" on YouTube

Music video
- "808 (Chinese version)" on YouTube

"808" is a song by Chinese singer-songwriter Jane Zhang. It was released as a single on November 21, 2017. It was included on Zhang's first English-language studio album, Past Progressive (2019).

== Commercial performance ==
"808" debuted at number 39 on the US Billboard Hot Dance/Electronic Songs chart in 2017.

For the week of January 3, 2018, "808" re-entered the US Billboard Hot Dance/Electronic Songs at number 31, later it peaked at number 23 on the chart.

== Live performances ==
In November 2017, Jane Zhang performed "808" at the Victoria's Secret Fashion Show in Shanghai, China, along with "Dust My Shoulders Off" and "Work for It".

== Track listing ==
Digital download / Streaming
No.	Title	Length
1.	"808 (Jack Novak Remix)"	3:00

== Charts ==
Chart positions for "808"
Chart (2016, 2018)	Peak position
China Airplay (Billboard Radio)	5
US Hot Dance/Electronic Songs (Billboard)	23

== Release history ==
Region	Date	Format	Label	Ref.
Worldwide	November 21, 2017	Digital download	Show City Times	
