= Jane@Music =

Studio album by Jane Zhang
- Released: January 20, 2009
- Genre: Pop
- Label: Huayi Brothers

Jane Zhang chronology
Dear Jane (2007)	Jane@Music (2009)	Believe in Jane (2010)

Jane@Music (simplified Chinese: 张靓颖@音乐; traditional Chinese: 張靚穎@音樂) is the third studio album by Chinese singer Jane Zhang, released on January 20, 2009 by Huayi Brothers.

== Track listing ==
1. Sound of Blooming Flowers (Chinese: 花开的声音) (4:45)
2. Could That Be Love? (Chinese: 那不会是爱吧) (3:57)
3. Light in the Darkness (Chinese: 黑夜里的光) (3:54)
4. It's Me (Chinese: 是我) (3:56)
5. Celebrate (Chinese: 我的音乐让我说) (4:20)
6. So Hard (Chinese: 为难) (3:49)
7. Close to You (Chinese: 靠近你) (4:27)
8. Sunshine Alike (4:23)
9. Eyes of Children (Chinese: 孩子的眼睛) (3:36)
10. My Way (Chinese: 我的路) (6:35)
