= Dear Jane (Jane Zhang EP) =

EP by Jane Zhang
- Released: December 8, 2007
- Genre: Pop
- Label: Huayi Brothers

Jane Zhang chronology
Update (2007)	Dear Jane (2007)	Jane@Music (2009)

Dear Jane is the second EP by Chinese singer Jane Zhang, released on December 8, 2007 by Huayi Brothers.

== Track listing ==
1. Dear Jane (3:39)
2. After I Leave (Chinese: 我走以后) (4:40)
3. Fortress Besieged (Chinese: 围城) (4:20)
