= Past Progressive (album) =

2019 studio album by Jane Zhang

Studio album by Jane Zhang
- Released: April 27, 2019
- Recorded: February 2014 – January 2018
- Genre: Pop; electropop; synth-pop
- Length: 56:00
- Label: Jane Zhang Studio
- Producer: Jane Zhang; Jim Beanz; Cheryl Banks; Rick Fraizer; Timbaland

Singles from Past Progressive
- 1. "Dust My Shoulders Off" Released: October 14, 2016; 2. "808" Released: November 21, 2017; 3. "Work for It" Released: November 28, 2017; 4. "Adam and Eve" Released: October 11, 2018; 5. "Pull Me Up" Released: January 23, 2019; 6. "Body First" Released: May 20, 2019

Past Progressive is the debut English-language studio album by Chinese singer Jane Zhang. It was produced by Timbaland, King Logan, Harvey Mason Jr. and released on April 27, 2019, on Jane Zhang Studio. the album's first single, "Dust My Shoulders Off," was released on October 14, 2016. This single became the advertising song of the US media HULU. With the spread of the song, some American musicians paid attention to Jane Zhang. so, Jane successfully invited Migos to produce a remixed version of the album's single, "Work for It".

== Background ==
In 2011, Jane Zhang wanted to launch an English album. In 2014, Timbaland began working with Jane Zhang on this English album.

== Accolades ==
List of awards and nominations
Year	Organization	Award	Nominee/work	Result	Ref.
2017	Golden Melody Awards	Best Music Video	"Dust My Shoulders Off"	Nominated	
2017	CMIC Music Awards	Best Dance/Electronic Performance	"808"	Nominated	
2019	Beijing Pop Music Awards	Best Female Singer	Jane Zhang	Won	
2019	Beijing Pop Music Awards	Best Songs of the Year	"Pull Me Up"	Won	
2019	Global Chinese Pop Chart	Top Songs of the Year	"Pull Me Up"	Won	
2020	Oriental Billboard Music Festival	Best English Album	Past Progressive	Won	

== Track listing ==
Track listing and credits adapted from Apple Music.

Standard edition
No.	Title	Writer(s)	Producer(s)	Length
1.	"Body First"	Antony Williams; Cassandra Stroberg; Fanny Hultman	Anthony Kilhoffer; Antony Williams	3:52
2.	"Pull Me Up"	Jack Brady; Jordan Roman	Harvey Mason Jr.; The Wavys	3:46
3.	"Work for it (Remix)" (featuring Migos)	Garrick Smith; Symphony Green; Quavious Marshall; Kiari Cephus; Kirsnick Ball	King Soloman for Royal Court Production; Eddie "Keyz" Foster; Banksy for J-Vu Entertainment	4:24
4.	"Battlefield"	Josiah "JoJo" Martin; Jane Zhang; King Logan; Paul "P.J." Morton; Timbaland	King Logan for Royal Court Productions; PJ Morton	3:56
5.	"808"	Jim Beanz; Candice Nelson; Jane Zhang; Jack Novak	King Logan Royal Court Productions; J-Vu; Side by Side Entertainment; Eddie (Keyz) Foster	3:00
6.	"Work For It"	Garrick Smith; Symphony Green	King Soloman for Royal Court ProductIons; Eddie "Keyz" Foster; Banksy	3:06
7.	"Fighting Shadows" (featuring Big Sean)	Eric Dawkins; Jane Zhang; Big Sean; King Logan	King Logan Royal Court Productions; J-Vu; Side by Side Entertainment	3:09
8.	"Think Like a Man"	Jim Beanz; Jane Zhang	King Soloman for Royal Court Productions; J-Vu; Side by Side Entertainment	3:15
9.	"Black Market"	Jerome Harmon	Jerome "J- Roc" Harmon for Bronze and Brainz; J-Vu Side By Side Entertainment	3:35
10.	"Dust My Shoulders Off" (featuring Timbaland)	Jim Beanz; Kirby; Jane Zhang; Timbaland	Timbaland for Timbaland Productions, Inc; Jim BeanZ	3:50
11.	"Adam and Eve"	Jim Beanz; Jane Zhang	Timbaland	3:51
12.	"Roll the Dice"	Jane Zhang; Jim BeanZ	Timbaland for Timbaland Productions	2:43
13.	"Lady Killer"	Cam Gee; King Logan; Banksy; Lehman Gray	King Logan Royal Court Productions; J-Vu; Side by Side	3:15
14.	"Angels and Harmony" (featuring Ne-Yo)	Ne-Yo; Jesse Wilson; Trevor Hotchkiss		4:01
15.	"Love Story"	K. Briscoe; Jane Zhang	Jerome Harmon (J-Roc) For Bronze & Brainz; Timbaland Productions	4:11
16.	"Balance Me Out"	K. Briscoe	Jerome (J Roc) Harmon For Bronze and Brainz; J-Vu Side By Side Entertainment	2:12
Total length:				56:00
