= Work for It =

Single by Jane Zhang

from the album Past Progressive
- Released: November 28, 2017
- Genre: R&B
- Length: 3:06; 4:25 (remix featuring Migos)
- Label: Montage

Lyric video
- "Work for it" on YouTube

Audio video
- "Work for it (Remix)" on YouTube

"Work for It" is a song by Chinese singer Jane Zhang. It was released as a single on November 28, 2017, by Montage Records. The lyrics video for "Work for It" was released on December 19, 2017. In November 2017, Jane Zhang performed "Work for It" at the Victoria's Secret Fashion Show in Shanghai along with "Dust My Shoulders Off" and "808".

The song and its remix version (featuring Migos) was included on Zhang's first English-language studio album, Past Progressive (2019).

== Track listing ==
No.	Title	Length
1.	"Work for It"	3:06

== Release history ==
Region	Date	Format	Label	Ref.
Worldwide	November 28, 2017	Digital download	Montage	
