= Show City Times =

Chinese music company

Beijing Show City Times Entertainment Ltd.
- Native name: 北京少城時代文化傳播有限公司
- Romanized name: Běijīng shǎo chéng shídài wénhuà chuánbò yǒuxiàn gōngsī
- Company type: Private company limited by shares
- Industry: Music and entertainment
- Founded: 2009
- Headquarters: Chaoyang District, Beijing, China
- Key people: Michael Feng (CEO)
- Products: Music and entertainment
- Website: www.showcitytimes.net

Beijing Show City Times Entertainment Ltd. (北京少城時代文化傳播有限公司), abbreviated as Show City Times (少城時代), is a Chinese music company established by Chinese singer Jane Zhang and her ex-boyfriend Michael Feng. The company's business involves talent management, record production, publicity and other fields.

After filing a divorce with Michael Feng in 2018, Jane Zhang left the company and launched out into a new personal studio for herself.

== Artists ==
- Alex
- Boss Shady
- Jocelyn Chan
- Liang Bo
- Liu Meilin
- Pan Chen
- QIO
- Su Lisheng
- Elvis Wang
- Reno Wang
- Wen Wei
- Xu Xinwen
- Zhang Liyin
- Xia Hanyu

== Former artists ==
- Gary Chaw (2012-2013)
- Jane Zhang (2013-2018)
