= Jane, Love =

EP by Jane Zhang
- Released: January 9, 2006
- Genre: Pop
- Label: Huayi Brothers

Jane Zhang chronology
Jane, Love (2006)	The One (2006)

Jane, Love (simplified Chinese: Jane·爱; traditional Chinese: Jane·愛) is the debut EP by Chinese singer Jane Zhang, released on January 9, 2006 by Huayi Brothers.

== Track listing ==
1. "Lights" (光芒) – 4:31
2. "To Be Loved" – 4:31
3. "Anti-Clockwise" (逆时针) – 3:49
4. "Lights" (光芒) (Instrumental) – 4:31
5. "To Be Loved" (Instrumental) – 4:31
6. "Anti-Clockwise" (逆时针) (Instrumental) – 3:49
