= Listen to Jane Z Live =

Live album by Jane Zhang
- Released: June 4, 2012
- Genre: Pop
- Label: Universal

Jane Zhang chronology
| Reform (2011) | Listen to Jane Z Live (2012) | Grateful (2013) |

Listen to Jane Z Live (simplified Chinese: 倾听 张靓颖; traditional Chinese: 傾聽 張靚穎) is the first live album by Chinese singer Jane Zhang, released on 4 June 2012 by Universal Music China.

== Track listing ==
| No. | Title | Length |
|---|---|---|
| 1. | "Opening" | 2:04 |
| 2. | "At Last" | 3:14 |
| 3. | "Dream Field" (梦田) | 3:33 |
| 4. | "I Didn't Know" | 5:01 |
| 5. | "Not So Easy" (好不容易) | 4:00 |
| 6. | "Song Dedicated to Mother (Flower of Women)" (献给母亲的歌（女人花）) | 4:27 |
| 7. | "Por una Cabeza" | 3:45 |
| 8. | "Concerto pour une Voix" | 4:19 |
| 9. | "Singing in the Rain" | 4:16 |
| 10. | "Loving Chillily" (冷漠地爱着) | 5:19 |
| 11. | "Single" | 4:14 |
| 12. | "Autumn Odor" (秋意浓) | 5:45 |
| 13. | "South Sea Lady" (南海姑娘) | 3:47 |
| 14. | "Letting Go" (放下) | 4:05 |
| 15. | "Until the End of the World" (直到世界末日) | 5:31 |
