= Believe in Jane =

Studio album by Jane Zhang
- Released: February 2, 2010
- Genre: Pop
- Label: Universal

Jane Zhang chronology
Jane@Music (2009)	Believe in Jane (2010)	Reform (2011)

Believe in Jane (Chinese: 我相信) is the fourth studio album by Chinese singer Jane Zhang, released on February 2, 2010 by Universal Music China.

== Track listing ==
1. Intro (1:08)
2. Hot (Chinese: 热) (3:39)
3. I Believe (Chinese: 我相信) (4:43)
4. It Will Be Just Fine (Chinese: 就这样好了) (3:57)
5. I Do (3:31)
6. If This Is Love (Chinese: 如果这就是爱情) (4:42)
7. Happy (Chinese: 快活) (3:29)
8. Can't Do It (Chinese: 办不到) feat. Da Mouth (3:16)
9. Low-High (Chinese: 低 High) (1:35)
10. I Don't Wanna Pray (3:31)
11. We All Live Up to Love (Chinese: 我们都辜负了爱) (3:53)
12. Needing You (Chinese: 需要你) (4:38)
13. Mulan Star (Chinese: 木兰星) (4:58) (Bonus track)
14. Dreaming (Chinese: 朝思暮想) (4:17) (Bonus track)
15. Courageous Love (Chinese: 勇敢爱) (4:15) (Hong Kong & Taiwan versions bonus track)
