= Update (Jane Zhang album) =

Studio album by Jane Zhang
- Released: August 2, 2007
- Genre: Pop
- Label: Huayi Brothers

Jane Zhang chronology
The One (2006)	Update (2007)	Dear Jane (2007)

Update is the second studio album by Chinese singer Jane Zhang, released on August 2, 2007, by Huayi Brothers.

== Track listing ==
1. Help Out (Chinese: 帮帮忙) (3:43)
2. Dream Party (3:46)
3. Love That Can't Be Given (Chinese: 给不起的爱) (4:04)
4. Sunset Boulevard (Chinese: 日落大道) (3:50)
5. We Are Together (Chinese: 我们在一起) (3:13)
6. A Promise (Chinese: 我们说好的) (4:31)
7. Sorrowful G Major (Chinese: G大调的悲伤) (4:36)
8. Yalta (4:30)
9. Your Song (4:06)
10. Expiration Date (Chinese: 保鲜期) (4:32)
