= The Seventh Sense =

Studio album by Jane Zhang
- Released: July 21, 2014
- Genre: Pop
- Label: Sony

Jane Zhang chronology
Grateful (2013)	The Seventh Sense (2014)	Starring Jane (2016)

The Seventh Sense (Chinese: 第七感) is the sixth studio album by Chinese singer Jane Zhang, released on July 21, 2014 by Sony Music China.

== Track listing ==
No.	Title	Lyrics	Music	Producer(s)	Length
1.	"I Am Mine" (我是我的)	Chen Xinyan	Dion Wardle, Peter Ighile, James Abrahams, Jarrad Kritzstein, Aimee Proal, Emi Joy Green	Adia	3:08
2.	"After Smile" (微笑以后)	Khalil Fong, Xiaohan	Khalil Fong	Khalil Fong	4:03
3.	"There's Nothing" (有沒有)	Lu Weixiao	Jay Chou	Jim Lee	4:22
4.	"Forever" (永远)	Jane Zhang, Xie Huafan	Jae Chong, Nicky Lee	Jae Chong	3:52
5.	"Bookmark" (书签)	Tian Le	Paul Drew, Pete Barringer, Maria Wilson, Greig Watts	Jim Lee	4:22
6.	"Bazaar"	Jane Zhang	Lisa Scott-Lee, Phillip Dyson, Daniel Sherman	Toshiya Kamada	4:08
7.	"Say Something" (说些什么)	Lan Xiaoxie	Tae Wan a.k.a. C-Luv	Adia	4:14
8.	"Pure Love" (感觉)	Jane Zhang	Cui Di	Adia	3:50
9.	"The Seventh Sense" (第七感)	Jane Zhang, Yu Chenmao, Na Siwan	Fredrik Fencke, Hanif Sabzevari, Freja	Toshiya Kamada	4:04
10.	"Together" (一起)	He Ping, Jane Zhang	Nalle Ahlstedt, Herbie Crichlow, Petriso	Wang Zhiping	4:37
11.	"Unwind"	Craig McConnell, Chad Richardson, Taleen Kalbian	Craig McConnell, Chad Richardson, Taleen Kalbian	Jim Lee	3:11
12.	"Get Out of My Life"	Amy Wallace, Vincent Chia	Amy Wallace, Vincent Chia, Pascal Guyon	Jim Lee	4:12

Pre-order edition bonus tracks
No.	Title	Lyrics	Music	Producer(s)	Length
1.	"Finally Wait Till You" (终于等到你)	Chen Xi	Dong Dongdong	Dong Dongdong
2.	"I'll Be with You to the End" (陪你走到底)	Chen Xi	Dong Dongdong	Dong Dongdong

== Accolades ==
Year	Organization	Award	Result
2015	QQ Music Awards	Best Female Singer	Won
2015	QQ Music Awards	Best Breakthrough Artist	Won
2015	Chinese Music Awards	Top 10 Mandarin Albums	Won
