= Reform (album) =

Studio album by Jane Zhang
- Released: June 1, 2011
- Genre: Pop
- Length: 41:40
- Label: Universal

Jane Zhang chronology
Believe in Jane (2010)	Reform (2011)	Listen to Jane Z Live (2012)

Reform (simplified Chinese: 改变; traditional Chinese: 改變) is the fifth studio album by Chinese singer Jane Zhang, released on June 1, 2011 by Universal Music China.

== Track listing ==
No.	Title	Lyrics	Music	Length
1.	"Personal Look" (我的模样)	Yu Chenmao	Tobias Jonsson, Anneli Axelsson	3:27
2.	"Chasing Love" (追爱)	Jennifer hsu	Lene Dissing, John Gordon, Keely Hawkes	3:53
3.	"Aboard" (出境入境)	Yuen Chen	Lee Jong-gyo	3:53
4.	"I Don't Care" (错就错)	Albert Leung	Ash Alexander, Chesney Hawkes, Keely Hawkes	3:49
5.	"Crazy for Love" (为爱疯狂)	Lou Nanwei	Michael Jay, David Abravanel, Lara Nahum	3:28
6.	"Bold" (大胆)	Jane Zhang	Michael Jay	3:11
7.	"Just Love" (爱就爱)	Adia Zhang	Adia Zhang	5:25
8.	"Sometimes" (有时候)	Jane Zhang, Zuo Anan	Zuo Anan	4:10
9.	"Last Chapter" (上一章)	Jane Zhang	Jane Zhang	3:53
10.	"Reform" (改变)	Adia Zhang	Keely Hawkes, Michael Jay, Andre Lindal	3:44
11.	"Beauty and Bravery" (美丽与勇敢)	Adia Zhang	Adia Zhang	2:47
Total length:				41:40
