= Jane Zhang =

Chinese singer, songwriter and record producer (born 1984)

Zhang Liangying Jane Zhang 张靓颖
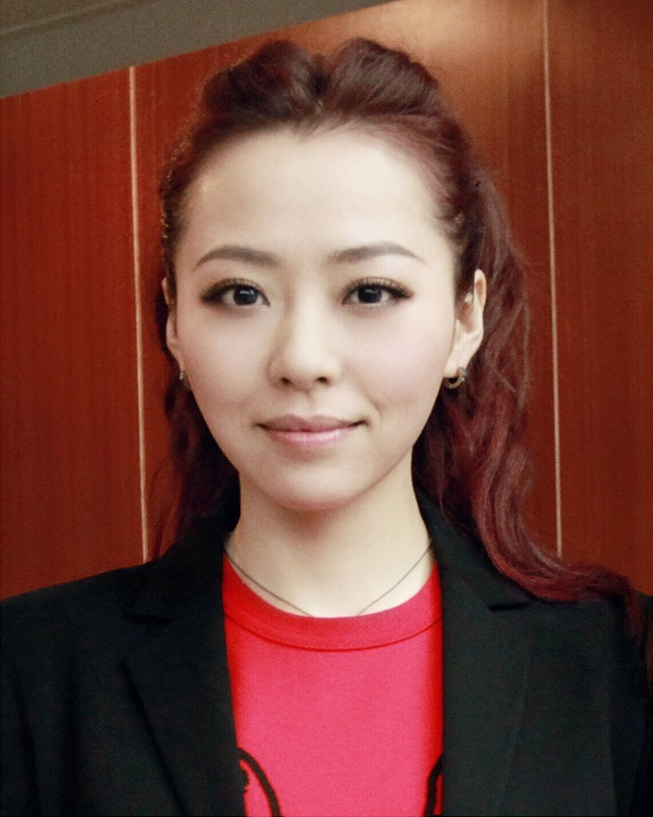
- Zhang in 2019
- Born: Zhang Liangying; October 11, 1984 (age 42); Chengdu, Sichuan, China
- Education: Sichuan University
- Occupations: Singer; songwriter; record producer
- Years active: 2003–present
- Spouse: Michael Feng Ke (冯柯) (m. 2016; div. 2018)
- Awards: Full list
- Musical career
- Genres: Pop; R&B; Jazz; Electropop; Dance-pop; World; Classical; China style
- Instrument: Vocals
- Labels: Huayi; Universal; Sony; Show City Times; Jane Zhang Studio

Chinese name
- Simplified Chinese: 张靓颖
- Traditional Chinese: 張靚穎
Transcriptions
Standard Mandarin
- Hanyu Pinyin: Zhāng Liàngyǐng
Yue: Cantonese
- Jyutping: Zoeng1 Leng3 Wing6
Southern Min
- Hokkien POJ: Tiuⁿ Chēng-éng

Zhang Liangying (Chinese: 张靓颖; pinyin: Zhāng Liàngyǐng; born October 11, 1984), also known as Jane Zhang, is a Chinese singer, songwriter and record producer. She is known for her signature use of the whistle register and has been dubbed the "Dolphin Princess" (海豚公主). Zhang began performing as a teenager by singing in pubs to help earn money for her family. After signing with Huayi Brothers Media Corporation in 2005, Zhang released her first studio album, The One (2006). Her second album, Update, was released in 2007. Zhang's third studio album, Jane@Music, was released in 2009. Her fourth studio album, Believe in Jane, was released in 2010. In 2011, Zhang released her fifth studio album, Reform, which was certified double platinum by the International Federation of the Phonographic Industry (IFPI).

Jane performed in the 2017 Victoria's Secret Show and was featured in the Oprah Winfrey Show. Her single "Dust My Shoulders Off" topped iTunes 4th and 1st in music video. She was invited and attended the Grammys twice. She was the judge for the Montreal international film festival. She has 40 million followers on Weibo and won China Best Female Artist seven times. Zhang released her first English-language studio album Past Progressive in 2019.

Zhang has received numerous awards, including nine Beijing Pop Music Awards for Best Female Singer, two China Gold Record Awards, and a MTV Europe Music Award. She has been included in the annual Forbes China celebrity lists from 2006 to 2013. In 2016, the Chengdu government estimated her annual output value at ¥1.1 billion ($160 million).

== Early life ==
Zhāng Liàngyǐng, known popularly as Jane Zhang, was born in Chengdu, Sichuan, on October 11, 1984. She took the English name "Jane" when she was at school, stating in an interview that she had "always liked the novel Jane Eyre" and paid homage to the novel in an EP. Her father, Zhang Huaqing (张华清), was a long-distance truck driver whose work frequently took him away from home; her mother, Zhang Guiying (张桂英), was a department-store assistant during that time. Zhang noted in an interview that "her parents divorced early [though she] did not realize the secret until years later". At the age of 15, Zhang's father died and "her mother was laid off from her job", so Zhang sang at a public bar to help support the family, adding to the 100 yuan per month she received from her late father's family. She told an interviewer in 2007 that she "lived in a bar for 6 years".

Zhang entered Sichuan University Foreign Language College for undergraduate studies in 2003. She began her singing career by winning third place at the Chinese singing contest Super Girl in 2005, and signed with Huayi Music the following year.

== Music career ==
=== 2004–2009: Career beginnings, The One, Update and Jane@Music, and soundtracks ===
"Only for Love"
"Only for Love" is the first original soundtrack of Zhang and the theme song of the Chinese film The Banquet.

In July 2004, Zhang won the "Chinese College Student Singer Competition", organized by Warner Music. In 2005 she won third place in the Chinese singing contest Super Girl. Although she did not win the competition, her voice still won her a huge following. A number of recording companies began to contact Zhang. Zhang finally chose to sign with Huayi Brothers Company and Hurray Company. Among them, Huayi Brothers are responsible for Zhang's traditional recording productions and promotion, and Hurray Company is responsible for her digital music marketing and promotion. Zhang began preparations for her first EP, Jane, Love, and the production team invited American musicians Denise Rich and Toby Gad to create singles for her. This EP has three songs, which were released in China on January 12, 2006. The EP has sold more than 500,000 copies in China.

In October 2006 Zhang sang the theme song "Only for Love" for the Chinese film The Banquet, joining hands with composer Tan Dun and pianist Lang Lang. Her first studio album The One was released in October 2006. It sold more than a million copies in China.

Zhang performing with Gavin Christopher in 2007.

Zhang's second studio album, Update, was released in 2007 and contained R&B and jazz elements. It was a notable change from the Chinese pop genre that many expected from her. Promoted by the success of her pop single "We said", Update became one of the best-selling albums of 2007 in China. In 2008 she released a song with Andrea Bocelli—"One World, One Dream", which was used for the Beijing 2008 Olympic Games.

In May 2008, Zhang was invited to perform in Tokyo. As part of Chinese President Hu Jintao's "warm spring" tour of Japan, Zhang performed at the residence of Japanese prime minister Yasuo Fukuda. China Daily commented that Zhang actively helped promote cultural understanding and friendship between the youth of both countries through her music.

Her trademark style is considered to be soft and heartbreaking love songs in songs prior to her third studio album, Jane@Music. Zhang has always been fascinated by live music and prefers singing live as opposed to recording in a studio. Jane@Music was released in January 2009 and includes more jazzy and faster songs. Subsequently, Zhang held a small concert at the Duo Music Exchange in Shibuya, Japan to promote the album. In May 2009, Zhang appeared on an episode of American television program The Oprah Winfrey Show, "The World's Got Talent", performing a medley of Chinese songs and "Hero" by Mariah Carey.

=== 2009–2015: Believe in Jane, Listen to Jane Z Live, The Seventh Sense and soundtracks ===
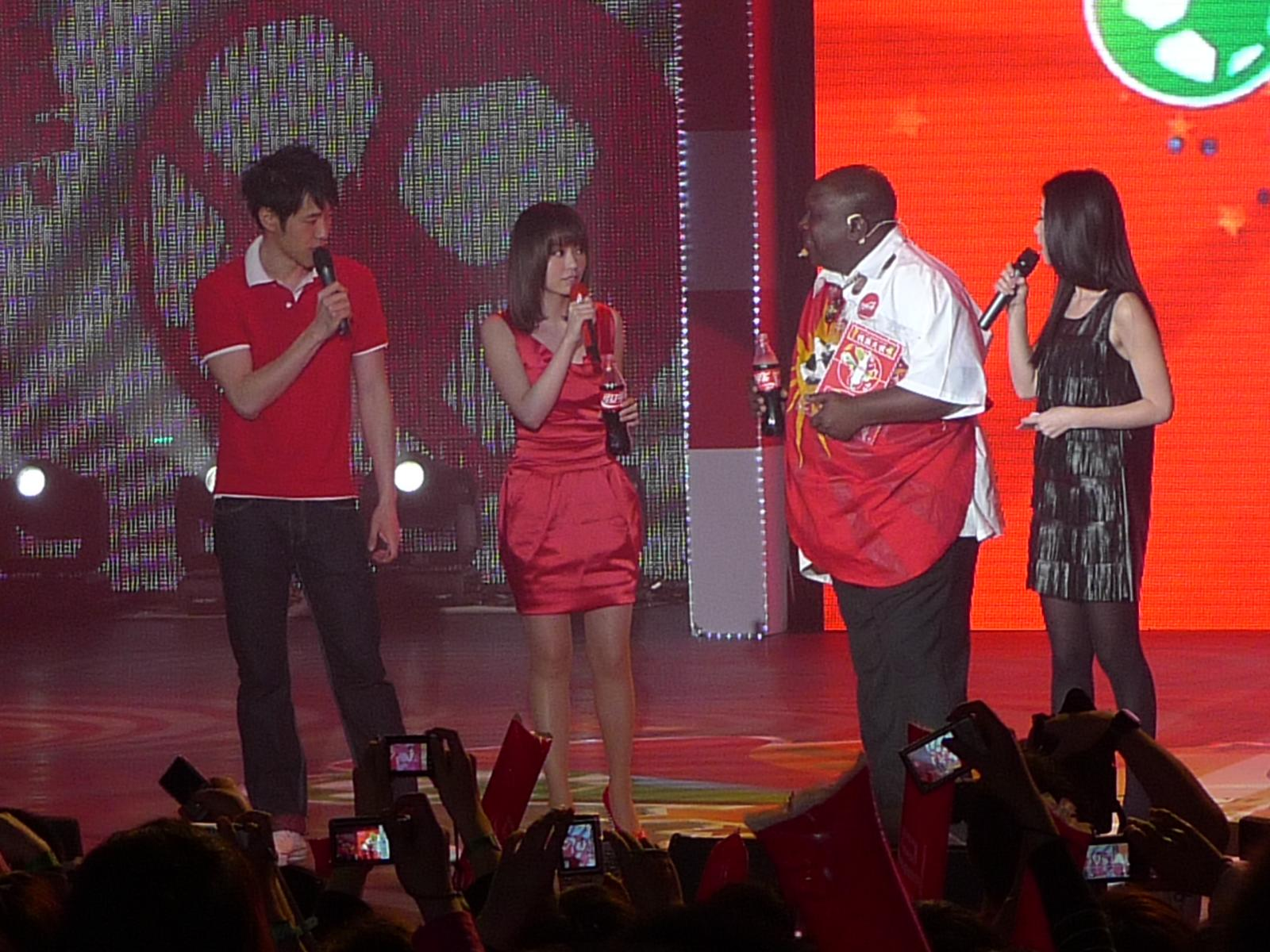
Zhang attends the Coca-Cola 125th Anniversary Celebration in 2010.

"Fighting Shadows"
"Fighting Shadows" is the first English original soundtrack of Zhang and the theme song of the American film Terminator Genisys.

On November 2, 2009, Universal Music announced the signing of Zhang, at a press conference in Hong Kong. She stated she had no plans to further her career abroad and has focused on the Chinese market.

After signing with Universal Music Group in 2009, Zhang released her fourth studio album, Believe in Jane in February 2010, which included the successful single "If This Is Love". On May 8, 2010, Zhang and Hong Kong singer Jacky Cheung, along with Somali rapper K'naan, original performer for the 2010 FIFA World Cup theme song, they are singing "Wavin' Flag" together at the Coca-Cola Pavilion at World Expo 2010 Shanghai. In August, she embarked on her first Believe in Jane Tour and travelled to Shanghai, Beijing, Tianjin, and Chengdu. In October 2010 she performed on Asia Song Festival in Seoul, South Korea.

On June 1, 2011, Zhang announced the release of her fifth studio album, Reform, stating that "more than 60 percent of the album ... can be labeled as typical Jane Zhang style". In China Daily, Han Bingbin and Qin Zhongwei wrote that the songs "cover a range of styles, from R&B to rock, hip-hop, and dance," that seven of the album's ten songs "were composed by US musicians" and that "a US postproduction team was involved to guarantee top quality". In addition, "Zhang wrote the lyrics for three songs, including one she composed herself". In the same year, she produced a single, "Summer of Love", for Chinese actor Yang Mi. The album sold 80,000 copies within a month in China and was certified double platinum by the International Federation of the Phonographic Industry (IFPI).

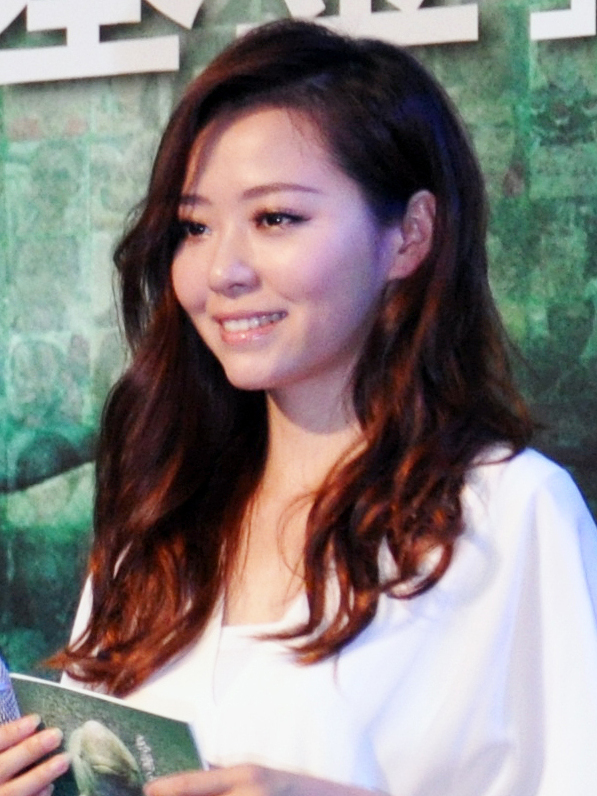
Zhang in 2013

Listen to Jane Z Live is a live album recorded by Zhang in 2012 and produced by Jim Lee. At that time Zhang flew to Las Vegas to see Cirque du Soleil's The Beatles Love, which inspired her to release a live album that she rehearsed for in 11 days. Zhang's love for English songs also led to the original production, I Didn't Know, which showcased her wide vocal range.

In July 2014, Zhang announced she signed with Sony Music. Simultaneously, her sixth studio album The Seventh Sense was released. It took her two years to complete the 12-song album. The disc contains two English-language songs: "Get out of My Life" and "Unwind". She wrote the lyrics of "The Seventh Sense", the theme song and namesake of the new album, based on her experiences during the past nine years. This album is the first in the Chinese music industry to be explicitly related to Chinese fashion. Zhang collaborated with the fashion magazine Harper's Bazaar to hold a custom show of cross-border music and fashion and released the song "Bazaar". In 2014, Zhang was a jury member at the 38th Montreal World Film Festival.

=== 2015–2019: Victoria's Secret Fashion Show, Past Progressive and Soundtracks ===
In the first half of 2015, Zhang participated in the Chinese music show I am a Singer. She sang two English songs "Bang Bang" and "All of Me" on the show, which led to the spread of these two songs in China. John Legend, the singer of "All of Me" was invited to perform as a guest performer at the Bang the World Tour Chengdu concert. In the middle of the year, Paramount Pictures announced that Zhang sang the theme song "Fighting Shadows" with Big Sean for the American film Terminator Genisys. It was the first time that Zhang has recorded a song for an English-language film. On June 30, 2015, the song was released by Sony Music Entertainment in Asia while Def Jam Recordings released it in other parts of the world. In October 2015, Zhang and DJ Tiesto released Change Your World, the theme song of the 2015 Budweiser Storm Music Festival.

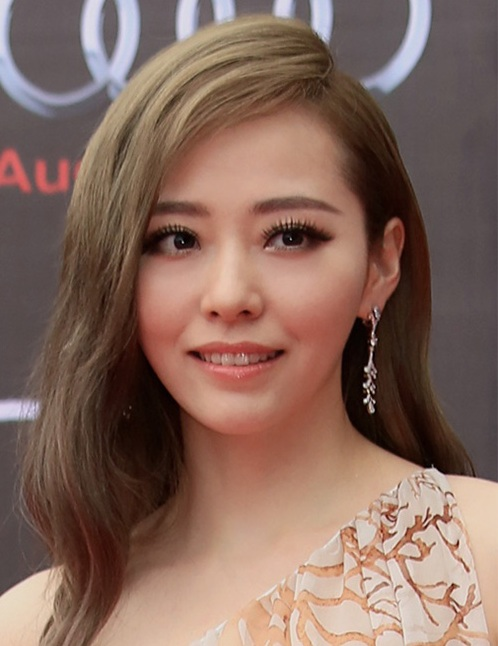
Zhang at the 2015 QQ Music Awards, Shenzhen, Guangdong

Zhang's Bang the World Tour was held to commemorate her singing career for a decade. The record company originally planned to record videos of the Beijing concert for the release of the DVD, but an accident occurred at the show: Zhang fell off from a two-meter round hollow of the elevator platform on the stage, which led to the tour's cancellation. Zhang was voted the Best World Act of the Asia region in the 2015 MTV Europe Music Awards. When she went to the award ceremony, she was told to stay backstage and accept the award there. Zhang and her team considered this treatment unfair and discriminatory, so they decided to officially pull out of the award's red carpet ceremony and all other EMA activities.

Zhang released "Dust My Shoulders Off", featuring Timbaland on October 14, 2016, as the lead single from her debut English-language studio album, Past Progressive. The single reached the top 10 on the US iTunes' songs chart. In November, Zhang released an English song "Battlefield" and its promotional music video for the Chinese-American co-production film The Great Wall. The song was composed by King Logan and PJ Morton and written by Josiah "JoJo" Martin and Zhang.

Zhang attended the annual Billboard Music Awards in Las Vegas on May 21, 2017. In October, she was invited to perform at the 2017 Victoria's Secret Fashion Show. This show premiered her English album's second single "Work for It" and the passionate dynamic song "808", and a short verse from "Dust My Shoulders Off". As the show aired around the world, the single "808" made the Billboard Hot Dance/Electronic Songs TOP 50 Chart for several consecutive weeks, reaching 23rd place at its highest. In November 2017, she was invited to perform at a Victoria's Secret Fashion Show. She was the first Asian singer to perform songs that placed her in the top ten on the iTunes Instant List.

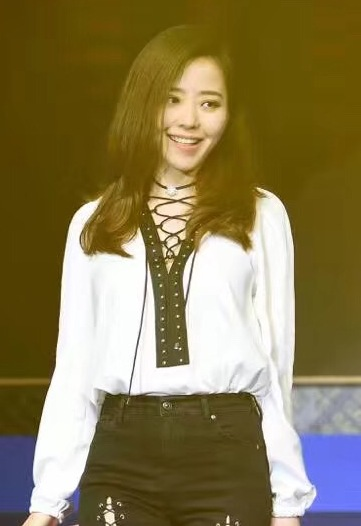
Zhang in 2017

On October 1, 2018, the Hong Kong government held fireworks display at the Victoria Harbour to mark the 69th anniversary of the founding of the People's Republic of China. The fireworks show was supported by Zhang's song "My Dream", which has the theme of the "Chinese dream". With a "smiling face" and "love", Hong Kong people are encouraged to pursue their own dreams. In 2018, the World Tour Concert of "Jane's Secret" was held; the show ranked 45th in the US in single-event mobilization.

Past Progressive was released on April 27, 2019, to positive reviews. The album has a production cycle of up to five years. Zhang won the Best Female Singer Award at the Beijing Pop Music Awards by her performance on this album—the ninth time she won this award.

=== 2023–present: Light World Tour ===
In 2023, Zhang collaborated with Japanese rock star Yoshiki to perform "Hero" (theme song for Saint Seiya: The Movie) in the documentary film Yoshiki: Under the Sky. During the same year, she embarked on the Light World Tour, which spanned 25 shows across Asia and North America.

== Artistry ==
=== Musical style ===
"Dust My Shoulders Off"
"Dust My Shoulders Off" is the lead single from Zhang's debut English studio album Past Progressive.

Zhang performing "The Diva Dance" in Shanghai in 2018, showcasing her signature use of the whistle register.

Zhang is known for her singing voice and technique. She performs in a variety of styles, including pop, R&B, rock, hip hop, dance. Her voice is clean and clear, with the ability to warble in the Chinese folk style. Her performance of "Painted Heart"—the title track of the 2009 box office hit Painted Skin—showed off her folk techniques as well as her vocal range.

=== Influences ===
Zhang grew up listening to artists such as Teresa Teng, Mariah Carey, Celine Dion, Whitney Houston, Beyoncé, Rihanna, and P!nk, who have all influenced her music. Zhang did not draw her first musical inspirations from classical folk. When she was working the pub and club circuit, her repertoire was mostly English cover versions and she became adept at picking songs to win her audiences over. Her versatility has demonstrated itself in the years after the contest and she is often compared with her idol, Mariah Carey. Musically, Carey is her biggest inspiration and she credits Carey as an explorer and trendsetter in both singing style and harmonic designs.

== Public image ==
Zhang ranked 43rd on the 2011 Forbes China Celebrities List. Cosmopolitan magazine in China recognized Zhang in their "Women of the Year" edition in 2008, noting that she was considered a strong female role model.

== Other ventures ==
=== Philanthropy ===
Zhang was invited by the China Health Education Center to make an anti-tobacco charity advertisement that appeals to people to say no to smoking in public spaces. She said that she hopes more people will realize the impact of secondhand smoke on their health. The charity ad was broadcast for the first time on China Central Television (CCTV) on World No Tobacco Day on May 31, 2013. In February 2007, Zhang was invited by World Peace One (WP1) to join a hundred world-renowned singers and bands to record a song called "Give Your Love". Zhang has publicly advocated for children's rights.

In 2010, she hosted some children from poor families and disaster-affected regions in a visit to the 2010 Shanghai Expo. In 2011, Zhang became a volunteer for WWF to protect the endangered narrow-ridged finless porpoise and has continually engaged the public regarding their protection. In 2012, she was hired by the WWF as the finless porpoise conservation ambassador. Zhang participated in the "One Woman" event of the United Nations Entity for Gender Equality and the Empowerment of Women (UN Women) and released the charity-themed song "One Woman" in 2013, in celebration of International Women's Day. In 2014, Zhang launched 'Blue Action' to raise funds for children on the autism spectrum.

=== Political appointments and appearances ===
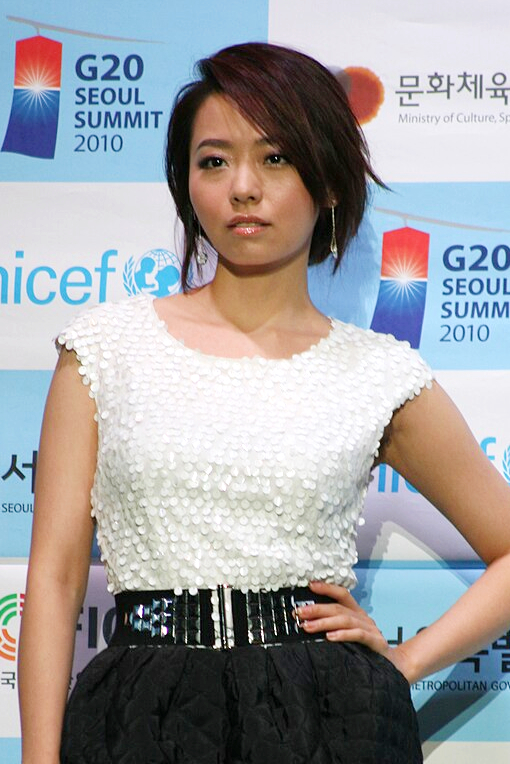
Zhang at the 2010 Asia Song Festival

In April 2006, Zhang attended the charity dinner at the BFA, performing "One Day When We Were Young" with former Australian Prime Minister Bob Hawke. Zhang was an ambassador of the United Nations International Children's Emergency Fund (UNICEF) University Volunteer Program in 2007. She wrote the song "We are together" for this event, and sent out the volunteer advocacy of "Caring for Children, Starting from Me". In January 2007, she attended a dinner hosted at the Embassy of the United States, Beijing, held in honor of the first US public image ambassador, Michelle Kwan, where she gave a thank-you speech. In October, Zhang attended another dinner hosted by the Embassy to welcome the US government's public diplomacy special envoy, Cal Ripken Jr., where she again was chosen to give a thank-you speech.

On July 11, 2009, she sang a song named "The Moon Represents My Heart" with Kuomintang (KMT) Chairman Wu Poh-Hsiung during a soiree to mark the fifth Cross-Straits Economic, Trade and Culture Forum in Changsha. On April 6, 2013, Zhang attended the Young Leaders Roundtable of the Boao Forum for Asia (BFA), a platform for high-level leaders from government, business, and academic circles to discuss pressing global and regional issues. During the discussion, she called on parents to pay more attention to their children's mental health. She also attended the 2014 Hong Kong Youth Music Festival at Victoria Harbor in Hong Kong, a festival that aims to create a platform for Asian youth in support of cultural interaction.

=== Sports ===
On August 16, 2014, Zhang sang the theme song "Light up the Future" during the opening ceremony of the 2014 Youth Olympic Games. In 2015, Major League Baseball launched a baseball reality show in China and invited Zhang as an image ambassador. In 2019, Zhang was hired as ambassadors of the 31st Summer Universiade in 2021.

== Awards and achievements ==
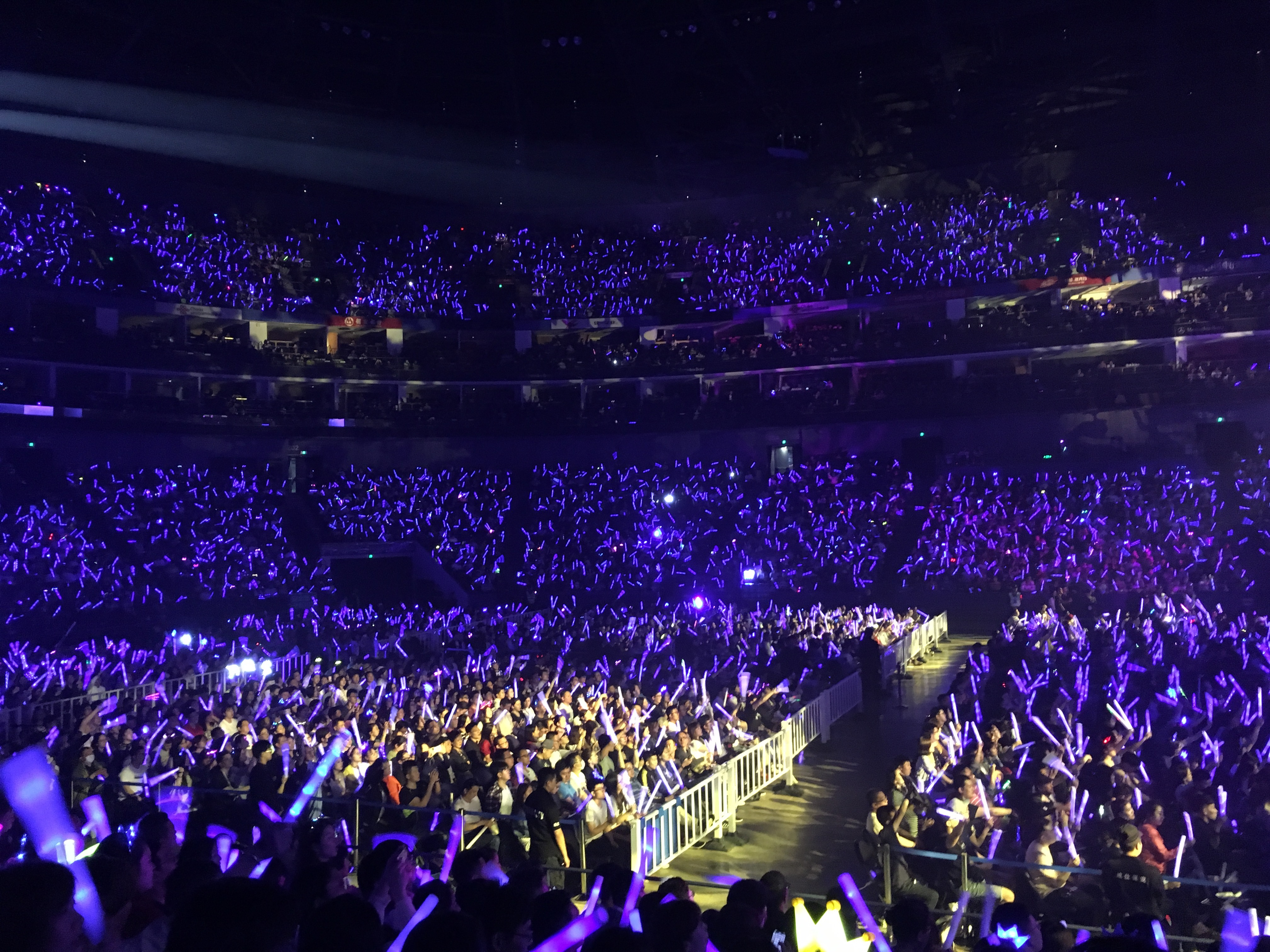
Zhang's Secret Tour in Shanghai in 2018

Zhang has received many awards and honors, including nine Beijing Pop Music Awards for Best Female Singer, two China Gold Record Awards, and an MTV Europe Music Award.

== Personal life ==
Zhang's personal life is the subject of constant media attention. In July 2015, Zhang publicized her 12-year relationship with Michael Feng, CEO of Show City Times, at the Hunan concert of 2015 Bang the World Tour by suddenly saying "[i]f you want to marry me, please come on stage". In October 2016, Zhang's mother Zhang Guiying suspected Feng of attempting to control her daughter's financials and posted a long open letter accusing him of cheating on her daughter and changing their company's shareholding structure without notifying her. On November 8, 2016, Zhang married Feng in Italy. However, they divorced on April 11, 2018.

== Discography ==
- The One (2006)
- Update (2007)
- Jane@Music (2009)
- Believe in Jane (2010)
- Reform (2011)
- The Seventh Sense (2014)
- Past Progressive (2019)

== Filmography ==
- McDull, the Alumni (2006)
- The Olympic Adventures of Fuwa (2007) as Yingying

== Tours ==
- Celebrate Tour (2009)
- Believe in Jane Tour (2010)
- Jane's Appearance Tour (2011–2012)
- Bang the World Tour (2015)
- Jane's Secret Tour (2018)
- Light World Tour (2023–2024)
- Chase World Tour (2025–2026)

== See also ==
- List of sopranos in non-classical music
