= Park Jong-hwan =

Park Jong-hwan may refer to:

- Park Jong-hwan (footballer), South Korean footballer and football manager
- Park Jong-hwan (actor), South Korean actor
