= Xie Keyin =

Chinese rapper and actress

- 谢可寅
- Born: Xie Xue; January 4, 1997 (age 29); Sichuan, China
- Other names: Shaking Chloe; Shaking
- Education: Nanjing University of the Arts
- Occupations: Singer; songwriter; actress
- Musical career
- Genres: C-pop; Hip hop
- Instrument: Vocals
- Years active: 2019–present
- Labels: JNERA Cultural Media; ADQC (Note: As a member of The9 only.); iQiyi
- Formerly of: Legal High; The9

Xie Keyin
- Traditional Chinese: 謝可寅
- Simplified Chinese: 谢可寅
Transcriptions
Standard Mandarin
- Hanyu Pinyin: Xiè Kěyín

Xie Keyin (Chinese: 谢可寅; Korean: 사가인; born Xie Xue [谢雪]; January 4, 1997) is a Chinese actress, rapper and songwriter. She is best known for finishing 5th in the survival show Youth with You 2, making her a member of The9. The9 officially disbanded on December 5, 2021 and Xie Keyin became a solo artist.

== Early life ==
Xie Keyin was born as Xie Xue on January 4, 1997 in Sichuan, China. She graduated from Nanjing University of the Arts. In April 2017, she changed her name from Xie Xue to her current name.

== Career ==
=== 2016–2019: Career beginnings and debut in 2019 ===
In 2016, Xie participated in Super Girl. She also participated in Girls Fighting.

In October 2018, she participated in Dragon TV's reality survival girl group show The Next Top Bang, where she was first introduced to hip-hop and rap. Xie, together with five other surviving members, debuted as Legal High in January 2019 with the single "嗨". The group released their second single, "心星", in February. They also won the "Best New Artist" award at the 26th Chinese Top Ten Music Awards in March.

On October 23, 2019, Xie made her solo debut with her self-produced single "NEVER SAY DIE" for the Youth Basketball Union.

=== 2020–2021: Youth With You 2, The9 and rise in popularity ===
In 2020, Xie took part in iQiyi's reality-survival program Youth With You 2. She eventually finished 5th with a total of 6,826,411 votes in the finals. She then debuted as a member of The9.

After debuting with The9, Xie actively participates in songwriting. The9 released their first EP, Sphinx X Mystery, with two tracks, "SphinX" and "Not Me". Xie took part in the writing of lyrics for both tracks. She collaborated with Silence Wang for the single "Tell Me A Joke", released on August 27, 2020, which she co-wrote. Xie also contributed rap lyrics and sang in the promotional OST "Wings" for the movie Let Life be Beautiful. This song was nominated for the 2020 SINA Top 10 Best Movies and TV Series. In December 2020, The9 released their first album. Xie took part in writing her own solo single "COMET" as well as fellow The9 member Yu Shuxin's solo single "GWALLA." On March 26 and 27 of 2021, Xie participated in The9's first virtual concert, debuting her solo stage for "COMET" and performing other The9 songs. Later that year, TME Tencent Music invited Xie to be part of its "Today is Valentine's Day" project, for which she wrote a new single, "Black Cupid". The single was released on June 14, 2021.

Besides music production works, Xie Keyin also develops her potentials in other areas of performing arts. In November 2020, she became a regular host in the cultural variety show Glory is Back. Under the leadership of exploration team leader Wang Han, Xie and two other exploration team interns, Qian Zhenghao and Li Haoran, presented the different dimensions of Dunhuang culture to a wider audience, including the younger generation. In December 2020, Xie participated in the variety show I Am the Actor Season 3 as a "new era idol". Her acting skills stunned judges and the general public, and after five rounds of competition, she reached the finals and received the "Best Potential Award." In March 2021, Xie was cast as one of the leading actors in the TV Series "Left Right" alongside Qin Hao, Ren Suxi, and Nie Yuan. On May 13, a female-focused sitcom format variety show, "Lady's Club," was officially announced with Zhang Tianai, Yang Zishan, and Xie Keyin as the main cast. Xie took on the new role as Club Founder/Chen Xingtong. In September 2021, Xie Keyin joins the main cast of the movie "Become a Winner" as Wu Yanyan alongside leads Li Chen and Celina Jade. The movie is produced by Xu Zheng and directed by Ren Pengyuan.。

The9 officially disbanded on December 5, 2021. Xie Keyin became a solo artist.

=== 2021: Post-The9, solo works ===
On December 12, 2021, Xie Keyin was invited to participate in CCTV6 Film Channel’s Silk Road International Film Festival and she wrote rap lyrics for song performance “七溜八溜 不离福州.” On December 27, 2021, Xie Keyin was nominated by Lu Chuan to become a finalist of the "CCTV6 Starry Oceans Young Actors Film Project." Through the project she participated in the 34th Golden Rooster Awards.。

== Discography ==
=== Singles ===
| Title | Year | Peak chart position | | Album |
| Title | Year | CHN (Note: The Billboard China Top 100 was launched in January 2019 by Billboard China and was last updated in September 2019.) | TWN | Album |
As lead artist
| "NEVER SAY DIE" | 2019 | — | — | Youth Basketball Union Soundtrack |
| "August" | 2020 | — | — | Non-album single |
| "Comet" (Note: Song was released under The9, but a solo released by Xie Keyin.) | 2020 | — | — | MatriX |
| "Black Cupid" | 2021 | — | — | Non-album single |
Collaboration
| "Tell Me A Joke"(讲个笑话) (with Silence Wang) | 2020 | — | — | 大娱乐家 |
Soundtrack appearances
| "Wings"(翅膀) (with Rong Zishan) | 2020 | — | — | Let Life be Beautiful OST |
"—" denotes releases that did not chart or were not released in that region.

=== Songwriting credits ===
| Year | Artist | Song | Album | Lyrics | Music |
|---|---|---|---|---|---|
| 2019 | Xie Keyin | "NEVER SAY DIE" | Youth Basketball Union Soundtrack | Yes | Yes |
| 2020 | The9 | "SphinX" (斯芬克斯) | Sphinx X Mystery | Yes | No |
| 2020 | The9 | "Not Me" | Sphinx X Mystery | Yes | No |
| 2020 | Silence Wang with Xie Keyin | "Tell Me A Joke" (讲个笑话) | 大娱乐家 | Yes | No |
| 2020 | Xie Keyin | "August" | Non-album single | Yes | Yes |
| 2020 | Xie Keyin with Rong Zishan | "Wings" (翅膀) | Let Life be Beautiful OST | Yes | No |
| 2020 | Xie Keyin | "COMET" | MatriX" (虚实X境) | Yes | No |
| 2020 | Yu Shuxin | "GWALLA" | MatriX" (虚实X境) | Yes | No |
| 2021 | Xie Keyin | "Black Cupid" | Non-album single | Yes | No |

== Filmography ==
=== Television series ===
| Year | Title | | Network | Role | Notes/ref. |
| Year | English | Original | Network | Role | Notes/ref. |
|---|---|---|---|---|---|
| 2022 | Left Right | 亲爱的小孩 | CCTV, IQIYI | Dong Fan | Supporting Role |
| 2024 | The First Shot | 雪迷宫 | Youku, IQIYI | Zhang Xueyao | Main Cast |
| 2024 | The Story of Pearl Girl | 珠帘玉幕 | Youku | Cui Shijiu / Cui Zhuohua | Supporting Role |
| 2024 | Under the Skin 2 | 猎罪图鉴2 | iQIYI | Ao Li | Supporting Role |
| 2026 | The Heart 2 | 问心2 | Tencent Video, IQIYI | Liang Mei | Supporting Role |
| 2026 | Road to Success | 灿如繁星 | iQIYI | Ju Li | Supporting Role |
| 2026 | Live Forever | 长生契 | Bilibili | Song Yiqiu | Main Cast |

=== Films ===
| Year | Title | | Role | Notes/ref. |
| Year | English | Original | Role | Notes/ref. |
|---|---|---|---|---|
| 2025 | Malice | 恶意 | Ming Ming | |
| 2026 | All The Good Eyes | 森中有林 | Ou Yangyang | |
| TBA | Become a Winner | 成为赢家 | Wu Yanyan | |
| TBA | Black Dog | 黑狗 | Yan Han | |

=== Variety shows ===
| Year | Title | | Network | Role | Notes | Ref. |
| Year | English | Original | Network | Role | Notes | Ref. |
|---|---|---|---|---|---|---|
| 2016 | Super Girl | 超级女声 | Mango TV | Contestant | | |
| 2016 | Girls Fighting | 加油美少女 | Dragon TV | Contestant | | |
| 2018 | The Next Top Bang | 中国梦之声·下一站传奇 | Dragon TV | Contestant | | |
| 2020 | Youth With You 2 | 青春有你2 | iQIYI | Contestant | Survival show that determined The9 members Finished 5th | |
| 2020 | Little Forest | 奇妙小森林 | Hunan TV | Guest | | |
| 2020 | Amazing Dinner | 未知的餐桌 | iQiyi | Guest | | |
| 2020 | Glory is Back: Dunhuang | 登场了！敦煌 | iQiyi | Cast Member | | |
| 2020 | I Am the Actor: Season 3 | 我就是演员 第三季 | Zhejiang TV | Contestant | Finalist; Received "Best Potential Award" | |
| 2021 | Hardcore Youth's Snow Season | 硬核少年冰雪季 | Douyin | Celebrity Apprentice | | |
| 2021 | Day Day Up | 天天向上 | Hunan TV | Guest | | |
| 2021 | My Dearest Ladies | 婆婆和妈妈 | Hunan TV & Beijing TV | Guest | | |
| 2021 | Lady's Club | 姐妹俱乐部 | iQIYI | Club Founder/Chen Xingtong | | |
| 2021 | Go Fighting! Treasure Tour (Season 2) | 极限挑战宝藏行2 | Dragon TV | Guest | | |
| 2021 | Poetries Next Door (Season 3) | 邻家诗话 第3季 | Tencent Video | Guest | | |
| 2021 | Glory is Back: Luoyang | 登场了！洛阳 | iQiyi | Guest | | |
| 2021 | Hi Directors | 导演请指教 | Tencent Video | Guest Actor | Lead Actress in Ning Yuanyuan’s short film “星星不说话.” | |
