= Terence Chang =

American film producer

- Chinese: 張家振
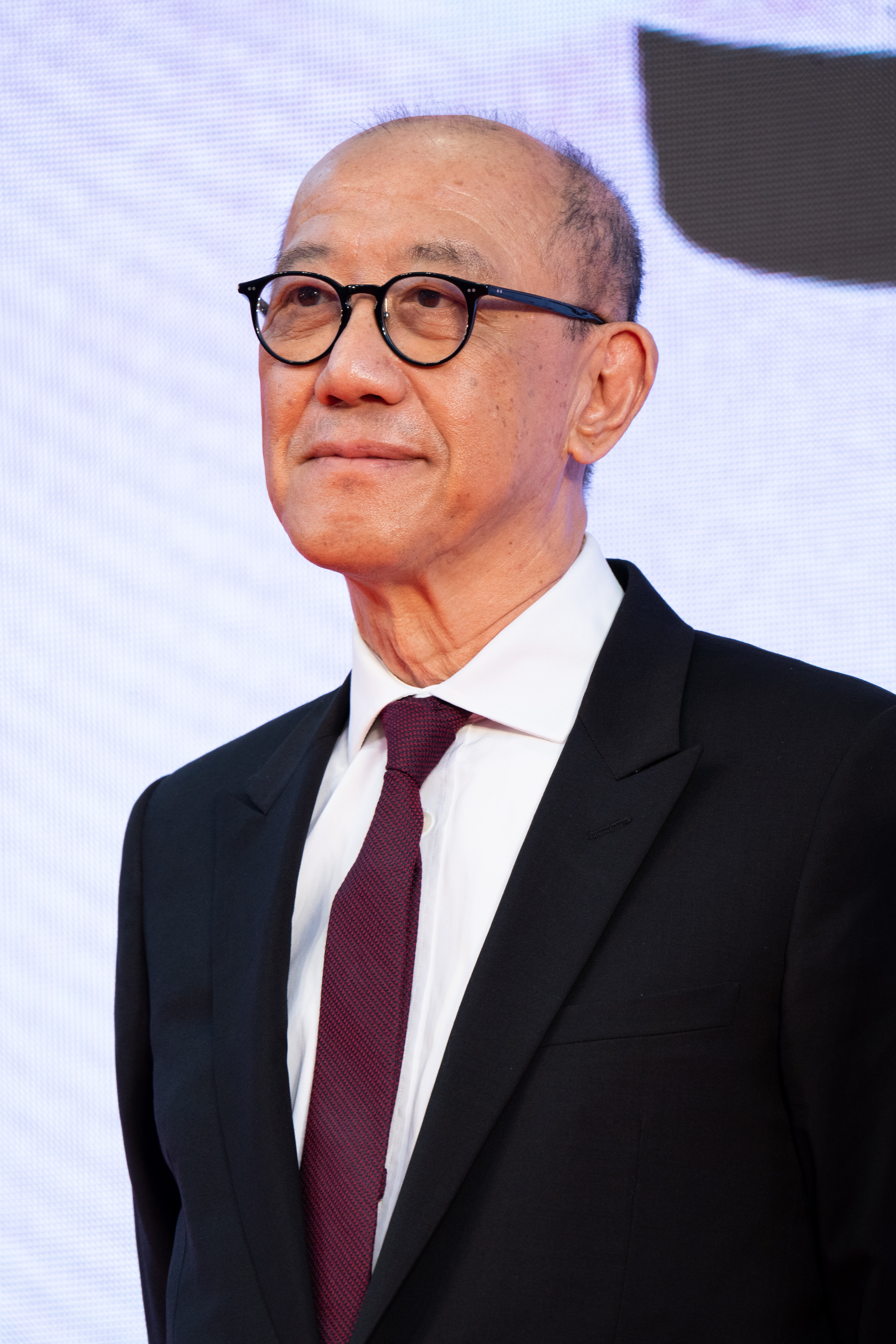
- Terence Chang at Tokyo International Film Festival (2019)
- Occupation: Film producer

Terence Chang Chia-Chen (Chinese: 張家振) is a Hong Kong and American film producer.

== Life and career ==
Chang was born in Hong Kong in 1949. In 1968, he took architecture courses at the University of Oregon; he then went on to study film at New York University in 1974. By 1977, Chang had gone back to Hong Kong to join Golden Harvest. On Itchy Fingers (1979), where he worked as an assistant producer, Chang met John Woo, whom he would develop a longtime friendship and business partnership with.

Chang left Golden Harvest in 1979 to join Rediffusion Television, where he oversaw the station's television production. During his tenure, Chang would befriend writer and producer Johnny Mak, and would join Mak's newly-formed production company in 1981. He is credited as an associate producer on Lonely Fifteen (1982), Dragon Force (1982), and Everlasting Love (1984). Everlasting Love would be screened at the Directors' Fortnight section during the 1984 Cannes Film Festival.

In 1985, Chang wrote and directed his debut movie, Escape from Coral Cove (1986). The following year, he joined D&B Films as the head of distribution. In a two year span, he helped promote films like Yes, Madam (1985), Legacy of Rage (1986), and Magnificent Warriors (1987) internationally. This would help bolster the overseas popularity for actors like Michelle Yeoh and Cynthia Rothrock. At the end of 1987, Chang joined Film Workshop as a general manager, where he would start to work closely with Woo. Chang would be the primary production executive for Woo's The Killer (1989), and The Swordsman (1990).

Chang would establish Milestone Pictures with Woo and Linda Kuk in 1990. Under this production company, Chang would produce multiple films by Woo, including Once a Thief (1991) and Hard Boiled (1992). He also would become the managers of writer Lilian Lee and regular Woo film star Chow Yun-fat. Alongside Kuk, Chang would form Eastern Renaissance Pictures with her, producing Treasure Hunt (1994).

Chang is one of John Woo's longtime friends and favoured producers. Chang produced the 1997 action hit Face/Off and Mission: Impossible 2. In 2008, Chang, Yeoh, and Taiwanese manager David Tang founded the talent management agency Stellar Entertainment.

Following the box-office disappointment of The Crossing, John Woo and Chang disbanded Lion Rock Productions. Following the film, Chang was an executive producer on Zhou Quan's film End of Summer and Lu Yang's 2014 film Brotherhood of Blades.

Following the disbandment Lion Rock, Chang created the Hong Kong–based Mannix Pictures, a team which included talent agent Amanda Yang Xin in Beijing and Shanghai-based Lucida Entertainment.

== Documentaries ==
Chang is among the actors, producers and directors interviewed in the documentary The Slanted Screen (2006), directed by Jeff Adachi, about the representation of Asian and Asian American men in Hollywood.

== Kowloon City ==
On August 22, 2007, Fruit Chan announced that he will make a film on Bruce Lee's early years, specifically, the Chinese-language movie, Kowloon City. The film will be produced by Chang. The film will be set in 1950s Hong Kong. Chang's credits include Made in Hong Kong, Hollywood Hong Kong and Durian Durian.

Stanley Kwan stated that he was talking with Lee's family to make a movie about the late action movie icon. Further, in April, Chinese state media announced that its national broadcaster started filming a 40-part TV series on Bruce Lee to promote Chinese culture for the 2008 Beijing Summer Olympics.

== Partial filmography ==
As producer

- The Killer (1989)
- Once a Thief (1991)
- Hard Boiled (1992)
- Hard Target (1993)
- Broken Arrow (1996)
- Face/Off (1997)
- Windtalkers (2002)
- Bulletproof Monk (2003)
- Paycheck (2003)
- Blood Brothers (2007)
- Red Cliff (2008)
- The Crossing (2014)
