= Zhou Quan =

Chinese filmmaker (born 1987)

Zhou Quan (Chinese: 周全; pinyin: Zhōu Quán; born 16 November 1987) is a Chinese filmmaker. His directorial debut End of Summer won KNN Award at 22nd Busan International Film Festival.

== Early life ==
Zhou Quan was born and raised in Shaoxing, Zhejiang Province, China. He moved to Melbourne, Australia in high school as an exchange student between Shaoxing No. 1 High School and Balwyn High School. After he graduated from RMIT University with a Bachelor of Communication (Media) in 2011, he enrolled in the American Film Institute and acquired his Master of Fine Arts in Directing in 2013.

== Career ==
Zhou Quan's AFI thesis film Woman In Fragments (2014), starring Akemi Look and Elizabeth Sung, and with an original soundtrack composed by Josh Winiberg, screened at international film festivals at Montreal, Hawaii, CAAMFest, Urbanworld, etc. It won Air Canada Short Film Award at Toronto Reel Asian International Film Festival and Best Narrative Short at Austin Asian American Film Festival.

Zhou participated in Taipei Golden Horse Film Academy led by Hou Hsiao-Hsien in 2014 and Berlinale Talents of Berlin International Film Festival in 2015.

In March 2015, Zhou presented his debut feature film project End of Summer (fka That Summer) at 13th Hong Kong - Asia Film Financing Forum and won the top HAF Award. The project was invited back to participate in HAF's Work-In-Progress Lab in 2017.

End of Summer (2017), received its World Premiere at New Currents Competition of 22nd Busan International Film Festival, and went on to screen at international film festivals of Rome, Minsk, Pingyao, Hong Kong Asian Film Festival, New York Asian Film Festival, etc. The film stars Zhang Songwen, Tan Zhuo, Ku Pao-ming, Dong Qing and Rong Zishan; There are some notable filmmakers participated in this film, including executive producers Terence Chang and Liao Ching-Sung, producers Jacqueline W. Liu and Yuyu Yang, editor Kong Jinlei, composer Lim Giong, and sound designer He Wei.

On December 3, 2017, Zhou was awarded "The New Film Director of the Year" at Tencent Video Awards.

In August, 2019, Zhou signed with CAA China.

In 2020, Zhou directed a fashion short film Le Vrai Ou for Vogue China starring Zhou Xun and Wang Yibo.

In 2021, Zhou's narrative short film, Breathe, starring Audrey Hui, Joan Chen and Sunny Sun, executive produced by Joan Chen, opened the Pingyao Corner section of the 5th Pingyao International Film Festival.

In 2023, Zhou reunited with Zhang Songwen and Rong Zishan on the iQiyi original series Lost in the Shadows.

== Critical reception ==
Director Tian Zhuangzhuang describes End of Summer as "lively recreated the immatureness, purity, sincerity and pain of childhood which we all once experienced yet fading."

IndieWire Senior Film Critic David Ehrlich listed End of Summer as one of 7 Must-See Movies at the 2018 New York Asian Film Festival and acclaimed the film "offers a gentler approach to many of the major concerns that grip contemporary Chinese cinema."
