= The9 (group) =

Chinese girl group

- Also known as: The Nine
- Origin: China
- Genres: C-pop; Mandopop
- Years active: 2020–2021
- Labels: ADQC; iQIYI
- Past members: Liu Yuxin; Yu Shuxin; Xu Jiaqi; Yu Yan; Xie Keyin; An Qi; Zhao Xiaotang; Kong Xueer; Lu Keran

The9 (stylized as THE9 or THE NINE) was a Chinese girl group formed through the IQIYI survival show Youth With You 2. The group consisted of Liu Yuxin, Yu Shuxin, Xu Jiaqi, Yu Yan, Xie Keyin, An Qi, Zhao Xiaotang, Kong Xueer and Lu Keran.

The9 was formed on May 30, 2020, and officially debuted on August 10, 2020. It was managed by Idol Youth Entertainment of iQIYI. The group was supposed to disband on November 30, 2021, but they disbanded on December 5, 2021.

== History ==
=== Pre-debut: Youth With You 2 ===
The9 was formed through the reality television show Youth with You 2, which aired from March 12 to May 30, 2020. It was the third season of the Idol Producer franchise. Out of 109 trainees from different companies, only the top 9 most voted trainees in the final episode got to debut in the final group.

On May 30, 2020, the final lineup was eventually announced. Liu Yuxin placed 1st, Esther Yu Shuxin came in 2nd, followed by Kiki Xu Jiaqi, Yu Yan, Shaking Chloe Xie Keyin, Babymonster An Qi, Zhao Xiaotang, Snow Kong Xue'er, and K Lu Keran in 9th place respectively. Since having earned 1st place, XIN Liu Yuxin was chosen as the center of the group.

=== 2020: Beginning of promotions, debut with Sphinx X Mystery and MatriX ===
On July 10, 2020, the group attended the "Current Business Conference" and announced their appointment as "Advance Officer for Edge Art."

The group released their first extended play, Sphinx X Mystery (斯芬克斯X谜), on August 10, 2020. The EP consists of the lead single "SphinX" (斯芬克斯) as well as another song titled "Not Me". The EP sold over 150,000 units in less than 45 minutes; it also won the "Double Platinum" rating. The music video for SphinX was released on August 15 via Weibo and YouTube. They promoted their EP through performances at variety shows and through music shows such as 818 Super Night. The group then announced their first variety show called "Let’s Party 2020" which would be released on iQIYI. The group released their debut studio album MatriX (虚实X境) on December 25, 2020 which features the lead single "Dumb Dumb Bomb" and nine solo tracks.

On December 31, The9 participated in the 2021 Jiangsu Satellite TV New Year's Eve concert.

=== 2021: RefleXtion, THE NINE and disbandment ===
From March 26–27, 2021, The9 held their first online concert titled "X-CITY," which garnered tens of thousands of viewers. The concert utilized XR technology to create realistic stage backgrounds.

On June 9, 2021, the group released their first anniversary EP entitled RefleXtion. The EP consists of two tracks: "Hello" and "Xenogeneic". The group officially disbanded on December 5, 2021.

=== 2022–2023: Reunion concerts ===
On August 19–20, 2022, The9 held their first reunion concert since disbandment at the Harbin International Convention Exhibition and Sports Center.

On October 27–28, 2023, the group held their second reunion concert at the Nanjing Youth Olympic Sports Park.

== Members ==
- Liu Yuxin / XIN Liu (刘雨昕) - Center
- Yu Shuxin / Esther Yu (虞书欣)
- Xu Jiaqi / Kiki Xu (许佳琪)
- Yu Yan (喻言)
- Xie Keyin / Shaking (谢可寅)
- An Qi / Babymonster An (安崎) – leader
- Zhao Xiaotang (赵小棠)
- Kong Xue'er / Snow Kong (孔雪儿)
- Lu Keran / K Lu (陆柯燃)

== Discography ==
=== Studio albums ===
Title	Details	Sales
MatriX (虚实X境)	Released: December 25, 2020; Label: ADQC, iQiyi; Formats: Digital download, streaming; Track listing: 1. Dumb Dumb Bomb; 2. BiuBiu; 3. Gwalla; 4. SKIN; 5. 薔薇之巔; 6. Comet; 7. Yea; 8. T.A.N.G; 9. Call Me By My Name; 10. K'	CHN: 370,000+

=== Extended plays ===
Title	Details	Sales
Sphinx X Mystery (斯芬克斯X谜)	Released: August 10, 2020; Label: ADQC, iQiyi; Formats: Digital download, streaming; Track listing: 1. 斯芬克斯 (SphinX); 2. Not Me	CHN: 1,100,000+
RefleXtion	Released: May 22, 2021; Label: ADQC, iQiyi; Formats: Digital download, streaming; Track listing: 1. Hello; 2. 异兽 (Exotic Beast)	CHN: 210,000+
THE NINE	Released: December 5, 2021; Label: ADQC, iQiyi; Formats: Digital download, streaming; Track listing: 1. 驭舞者; 2. Devil's song 3. 我们啊	CHN: 92,000+

=== Songs ===
Title	Year	Peak chart position	Album
Title	Year	CHN (Note: The China TME UNI Chart was launched by Tencent Music in 2018 and first published by Billboard in November 2022.)	Album
"斯芬克斯" (SphinX)	2020	5	Sphinx X Mystery
"Not Me"	2020	9	Sphinx X Mystery
"Dumb Dumb Bomb"	2020	60	MatriX
"BiuBiu"	2020	26	MatriX
"Gwalla"	2020	—	MatriX
"SKIN"	2020	57	MatriX
"蔷薇之巅"	2020	39	MatriX
"Comet"	2020	—	MatriX
"Yea"	2020	—	MatriX
"T.A.N.G"	2020	—	MatriX
"Call Me By My Name"	2020	75	MatriX
"K'"	2020	—	MatriX
"Hello"	2021	42	RefleXtion
"异兽" (Exotic Beast)	2021	33	RefleXtion
"我们啊"	2021	80	THE NINE
"Devil's song"	2021	—	THE NINE
"驭舞者"	2021	—	THE NINE
"—" denotes releases that did not chart or were not released in that region.

=== Promotional singles ===
Title	Release date	Remarks
"Yes OK!"	March 12, 2020	Theme song of Youth With You 2
"Super Shiny Summer"	July 30, 2020	Promotional song for the Oppo Reno 4; features XIN Liu, Esther Yu and Zhao Xiaotang

== Videography ==
=== Music videos ===
Title	Year	Length	Ref.
"SphinX"	2020	3:42	

== Filmography ==
=== Variety Shows ===
Year	Title	Network	Originally Aired	Notes
2020	Youth With You 2	iQiYi	March 12 – May 30	Contestants (final winners)
2020	Hunan TV 618 Super Pin Night + Hunan TV 818 Super Pin Night	Hunan Television	July	Performers ("Yes OK!", "Hunt", "SphinX")
2020	Go Fighting! Season 6	Dragon Television	July 26	The9 (finale guests, episode 12)
2020	Little Forest (Chinese: 《奇妙的小森林》; pinyin: Qímiào de Xiǎo Sēnlín; lit. 'Wonderful Little Forest')	Mango TV	August 1 – August 15	Xu Jiaqi and Xie Keyin (guests, episodes 8–10)
2020	Summer Surf Shop	iQiYi	August 28 – September 5	An Qi and Zhao Xiaotang (guests, episodes 9–10)
2020	Amazing Dinner	iQiYi	August 6–7 (Note: Although Episode 8 premiered on iQiYi before episodes 9–10 of Summer Surf Shop, the episode of Amazing Dinner was filmed later, as Zhao Xiaotang talks about losing her fear of the sea while filming Summer Surf Shop.)	Xie Keyin and Zhao Xiaotang (guests, episode 8)
2020	Masked Dancing King Season 1	Youku	August 16 – October 18	Liu Yuxin and An Qi (contestants)
2020	Let's Party!	iQiYi	September 4 – November 21	The group's variety show
2020	Happy Camp (2020)	Hunan Television	September 19	The9 (performance guest); Liu Yuxin, Yu Shuxin, Zhao Xiaotang (involved in guests’ activities with the show's MC)
2020	Go Fighting! Treasure Hunt, Season 1 (Chinese: 《极限挑战·宝藏行》; pinyin: Jíxiàn Tiǎozhàn·Bǎozàng Xíng)	Dragon Television	September 29	Yu Shuxin (guest, episode 9)
2020	Little Giant Games	Mango TV		Xu Jiaqi (fixed cast); Kong Xue'er (guest), Yu Yan (unaired)
2020	Dimension Nova (Chinese: 《跨次元新星》; pinyin: Kuà Cìyuán Xīnxīng; lit. 'Inter-Dimensional Rising Star')	iQiYi	October 21 – December 23	Yu Shuxin (fixed cast, mentor)
2020	Field of Hope (Chinese: 《希望的田野》; pinyin: Xīwàng de Tiányě)	Mango TV		An Qi (fixed cast); Zhao Xiaotang (guest, episode 9)
2020	Sending 100 Girls Home Season 4	Sohu		Yu Shuxin (guest)
2020	Glory is Back! Dunhuang (Chinese: 登场了！敦煌; pinyin: Dēngchǎngle! Dūnhuáng; lit. 'It's On Stage! Dunhuang')	iQiYi	2020 November 18 – 2021 January 21	Xie Keyin (fixed cast); Lu Keran (guest, episode 3)
2020	Ladies' Talk (Chinese: 《姐妹们的茶话会》; pinyin: Jiěmèimen de Cháhuàhuì; lit. 'Sisters' Tea Party')	iQiYi	2020 December 2 – 2021 February 17	Zhao Xiaotang (fixed cast, host)
2020	Fourtry Season 2	iQiYi	2020 December 4 – 2021 February 19	Liu Yuxin (fixed cast); Zhao Xiaotang and Kong Xue'er (guests, episodes 5–6)
2020	I Am the Actor Season 3	Zhejiang TV	2020 December 12 – 2021 March 6	Xie Keyin (contestant)
2020	Treasured Village (Chinese: 《宝藏般的乡村》; pinyin: Bǎozàng Bān de Xiāngcūn)	Zhejiang TV	2020 December 20 – 2021 February 21	Kong Xue'er (fixed cast)
2021	HAHAHAHAHA Season 1	iQiYi and Tencent Video	January 15–22	Yu Shuxin (guest, episode 10), Kong Xue'er (guest, episodes 10.2–11)
2021	Youth With You 3	iQiYi	February 18 – May 1	Yu Shuxin (Youth Tutor); The9 (guests, episode 8); Yu Yan, An Qi, Lu Keran (senior mentor collaboration performance)

== Concert ==
Year	Name	Date	Platform/Venue
2021	X-City	26 & 27 March 2021	iQiyi (Online)

== Awards ==
Name of the award ceremony, year presented, category, nominee of the award, and the result of the nomination
Award	Year	Category	Nominee / Work	Result
Cosmo Glam Night 2020	2020	Artist of the Year	The9	Won
Madame Figaro Beauty Star	2020	Beauty Star	The9	Won
2021 iQIYI Scream Night	2020	Popular Female Artist	The9	Won
2020 Ifeng Fashion Choice	2020	Fashion Energy Group of the Year	The9	Won
2020 Sina Fashion Style Awards	2020	Idol Group of the Year	The9	Won
Rayli Fashion Gala	2020	Favourite Group of the Year	The9	Won
Asian Pop Music Awards	2020	Popularity Award (Female Group)	The9	Won
Sina Film and Television Festival	2020	Musical Work of the Year	斯芬克斯 (SphinX)	Won
Sina Film and Television Festival	2020	Variety Show of the Year	Let's Party! 2020	Won
2020 Baidu Entertainment Awards	2021	Best Group of the Year	The9	Won
2020 Weibo Night	2021	Weibo's Hottest Group of the Year	The9	Won
Weibo Starlight Awards 2020	2021	The Most Popular Artist Internationally	The9	Won
