= 22nd Busan International Film Festival =

2017 edition of film festival

- Opening film: Glass Garden
- Closing film: Love Education
- Location: Busan Cinema Center
- Founded: 1995
- Hosted by: Jang Dong-gun; Im Yoon-ah
- No. of films: 300
- Festival date: Opening: October 12, 2017; Closing: October 21, 2017

Busan International Film Festival
- 23rd 21st

The 22nd Busan International Film Festival was held from October 12 to October 21, 2017 at the Busan Cinema Center and hosted by Jang Dong-gun and Im Yoon-ah. A total of 300 films from 75 countries were screened at the festival, including 100 world premieres and 29 international premieres.

On October 15, 2017, President Moon made a surprise visit to the festival, promising noninterference and support for the festival. He also hopes BIFF will restore to its former glory and into a more prominent international film festival.

A new Kim Jiseok Award was set up to commemorate the late Kim Jiseok, the Deputy Director and Program Director of Busan International Film Festival, who died in May 2017. Kim, also a founding member of the Busan International Film Festival, had since 1996, devoted himself to developing the Busan International Film Festival into a world-renowned film festival in Asia.

== Program ==
=== Opening ===
- Glass Garden - Shin Su-won (South Korea)

=== Gala Presentation ===
- Butterfly Sleep - Jeong Jae-eun (South Korea/Japan)
- Manhunt - John Woo (Hong Kong, China)
- Mother! - Darren Aronofsky (United States)
- Narratage - Isao Yukisada (Japan)
- The Third Murder - Hirokazu Kore-eda (Japan)

=== A Window on Asian Cinema ===
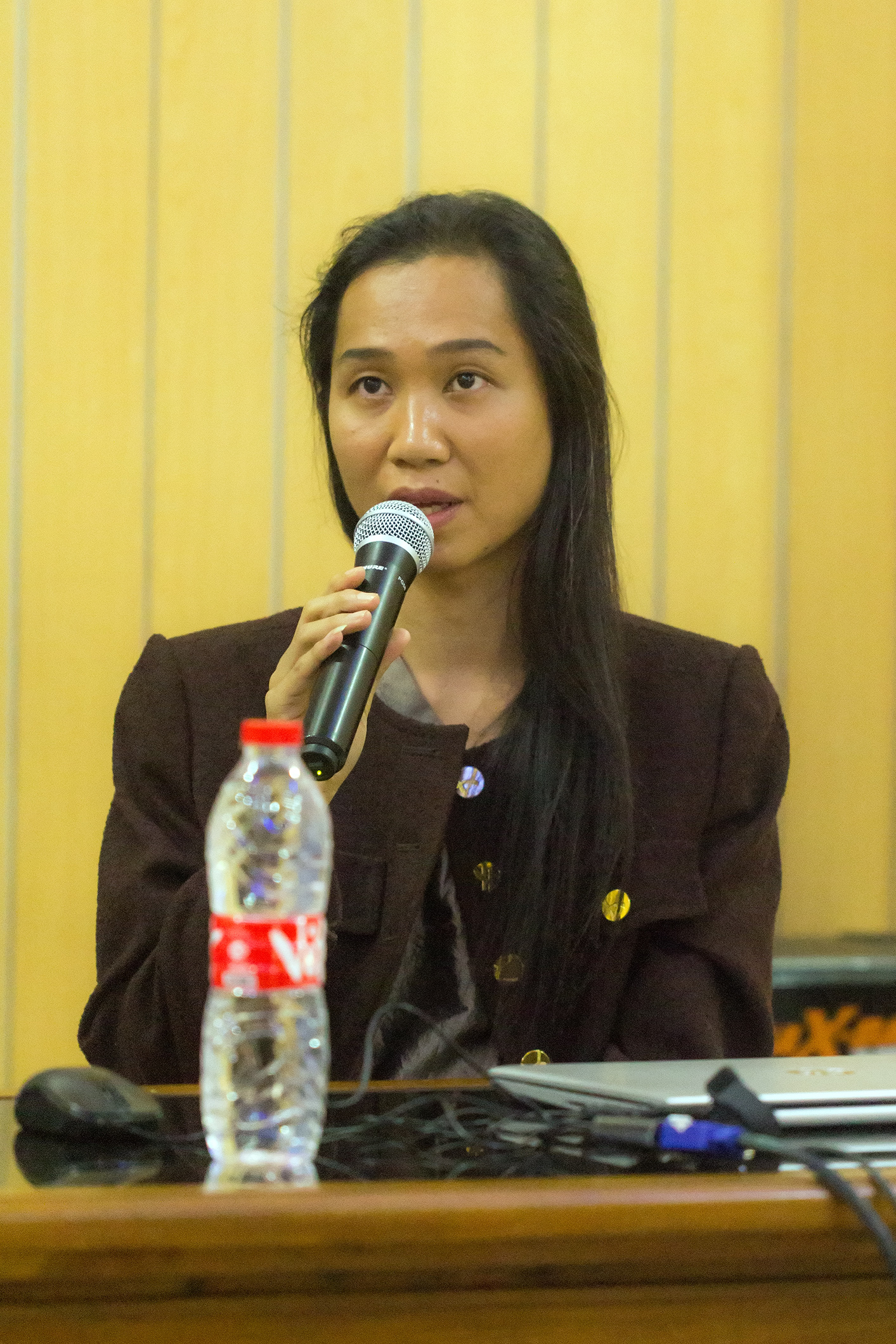
Anucha Boonyawatana; her film Malila: The Farewell Flower was among those screened

- Alone - Akan Satayev (Kazakhstan)
- Angamaly Diaries - Lijo Jose Pellissery (India)
- Ash - Li Xiaofeng (China)
- Baahubali 2: The Conclusion - S. S. Rajamouli (India)
- A Beautiful Star - Daihachi Yoshida (Japan)
- Before We Vanish - Kiyoshi Kurosawa (Japan)
- Beyond the Clouds - Majid Majidi (India)
- Birds Without Names - Kazuya Shiraishi (Japan)
- Blade of the Immortal - Takashi Miike (Japan/United Kingdom)
- The Bold, the Corrupt, and the Beautiful - Yang Ya-che (Taiwan)
- Mukkabaaz - Anurag Kashyap (India)
- Brotherhood of Blades II: The Infernal Battlefield - LU Yang (China)
- The Carousel Never Stops Turning - Ismail BASBETH (Indonesia)
- Close-Knit - Naoko Ogigami (Japan)
- The Decaying - Sonny CALVENTO (Philippines)
- Dragonfly Eyes - Xu Bing (China)
- Goodbye Kathmandu - Nabin Subba (Nepal)
- The Great Buddha+ - HUANG Hsin-Yao (Taiwan)
- In the Shadows - Dipesh JAIN (India/United Kingdom/Germany)
- The Insult - Ziad Doueiri (Lebanon/France)
- The Journey - Mohamed Al-Daradji (Iraq/United Kingdom/Netherlands)
- A Letter to the President - Roya Sadat (Afghanistan)
- Love and Shukla (original title Haanduk; Jatla Siddartha, India)
- Malila: The Farewell Flower - Anucha BOONYAWATANA (Thailand)
- A Man of Integrity - Mohammad Rasoulof (Iran)
- Marlina the Murderer in Four Acts - Mouly Surya (Indonesia/France/Malaysia/Thailand)
- Miracles of the Namiya General Store - Ryūichi Hiroki (Japan)
- Missing Johnny - HUANG Xi (Taiwan)
- Munabia - Taalaibek KULMENDEEV (Kyrgyzstan)
- No Bed of Roses - Mostofa Sarwar Farooki (Bangladesh/India)
- No Date, No Signature - Vahid Jalilvand (Iran)
- Omerta - Hansal Mehta (India)
- Our Time Will Come - Ann Hui (China/Hong Kong, China)
- Outrage Coda - Takeshi Kitano (Japan)
- Pigeon Tango - LEE Chi Yuarn (Taiwan)
- Pop Aye - Kirsten Tan (Singapore/Thailand)
- Poppy Goes to Hollywood Redux - Visal SOK (Cambodia)
- Radiance - Naomi Kawase (Japan/France)
- The Ringside Story - TAKE Masaharu (Japan)
- Samui Song - Pen-Ek Ratanaruang (Thailand/Germany/Norway)
- The Scythian Lamb - Daihachi Yoshida (Japan)
- Sea Serpent - Joseph Laban (Philippines)
- The Seen and Unseen - Kamila Andini (Indonesia/Netherlands/Australia/Qatar)
- Side Job - Ryūichi Hiroki (Japan)
- Silent Mist - ZHANG Miaoyan (China/France)
- Smaller and Smaller Circles - Raya Martin (Philippines)
- Sweating the Small Stuff - NINOMIYA Ryutaro (Japan)
- The Tailor - Tran Buu Loc, Kay Nguyen (Vietnam)
- They - Anahita GHAZVINIZADEH (United States/Qatar)
- Those Long Haired Nights - Gerardo Calagui (Philippines)
- The Tokyo Night Sky Is Always the Densest Shade of Blue - Yuya Ishii (Japan)
- Underpants Thief - Somaratne Dissanayake (Sri Lanka)
- Wajib - Annemarie Jacir (Palestine)
- Walking Past the Future - Li Ruijun (China/Hong Kong, China)
- Wilderness - KISHI Yoshiyuki (Japan)
- ZOO - Shlok SHARMA (India)

=== New Currents ===
- After My Death - Kim Ui-seok (Korea)
- Ajji - Devashish Makhija (India)
- Ashwatthama - Pushpendra SINGH (India/Korea)
- Blockage - Mohsen GHARAEI (Iran)
- End of Summer - Zhou Quan (China)
- How to Breathe Underwater - KO Hyunseok (Korea)
- Last Child - SHIN Dongseok (Korea)
- The Last Verse - TSENG Ying-Ting (Taiwan)
- One Night on the Wharf - HAN Dong (China)
- Somewhere Beyond the Mist - CHEUNG King Wai (Hong Kong, China)

=== Korean Cinema Today - Panorama ===
- America Town - Jeon Soo-il (Korea)
- Anarchist from Colony - Lee Joon-ik (Korea)
- The Battleship Island: Director's Cut - Ryoo Seung-wan (Korea)
- Bluebeard - LEE Sooyoun (Korea)
- The Day After - Hong Sang-soo (Korea)
- The Emperor - MIN Byunghun, LEE Sanghun (Korea)
- Mermaid - O Muel (Korea)
- Method - PANG Eunjin (Korea)
- Misbehavior - Kim Tae-yong (Korea)
- Missing - E Oni (Korea)
- Notebook from My Mother - KIM Sungho (Korea)
- Okja - Bong Joon-ho (Korea/United States)
- Old Love - PARK Kiyong (Korea/Japan)
- Romans 8:37 - Shin Yeon-shick (Korea)
- Taklamakan - KO Eunki (Korea)
- A Taxi Driver - Jang Hoon (Korea)

=== Korean Cinema Today - Vision ===
- Black Summer - LEE Weonyoung (Korea)
- Counting the Stars at Night - CHOI Yongseok (Korea)
- February - KIM Joonghyun (Korea)
- A Haunting Hitchhike - JEONG Heejae (Korea)
- Hit the Night - JEONG Gayoung (Korea)
- Home - KIM Jongwoo (Korea)
- Microhabitat - JEON Gowoon (Korea)
- Mothers - Lee Dong-eun (Korea)
- Park Hwa-young - LEE Hwan (Korea)
- Possible Faces - LEE Kanghyun (Korea)
- A Tiger in Winter - Lee Kwang-kuk (Korea)

=== Korean Cinema Retrospective ===
==== The Legendary Star, Shin Seong-il ====
- The Barefooted Youth - Kim Ki-duk (Korea)
- A Day Off - Lee Man-hee (Korea)
- Early Rain - Jung Jin-woo (Korea)
- Eunuch - Shin Sang-ok (Korea)
- The General's Mustache - LEE Seong-gu (Korea)
- Gilsotteum - Im Kwon-taek (Korea)
- Heavenly Homecoming to Stars - Lee Jang-ho (Korea)
- Mist - Kim Soo-yong (Korea)

=== World Cinema ===
- 9 Fingers - F. J. Ossang (France/Portugal)
- April's Daughter - Michel Franco (Mexico)
- Australia Day - Kriv Stenders (Australia)
- Battle of the Sexes - Jonathan Dayton and Valerie Faris (United States)
- Beyond the River - Craig FREIMOND (South Africa)
- Bye Bye Germany - Sam Garbarski (Germany/Belgium/Luxembourg)
- Carbon - Olivier Marchal (France)
- The Confession - Zaza Urushadze (Georgia/Estonia)
- Directions - Stephan Komandarev (Bulgaria/Germany/Macedonia)
- Diving - Mélanie Laurent (France)
- The Double Lover - François Ozon (France/Belgium)
- Downsizing - Alexander Payne (United States)
- Equilibrium - Vincenzo Marra (Italy)
- Euphoria - Lisa Langseth (Sweden/Germany)
- A Fantastic Woman - Sebastián Lelio (Chile)
- The Florida Project - Sean Baker (United States)
- Frost - Šarūnas Bartas (Lithuania/France/Poland/Ukraine)
- A Gentle Creature - Sergei Loznitsa (France/Germany/Netherlands/Lithuania)
- Good Manners - Juliana ROJAS, Marco DUTRA (Brazil/France)
- Hochelaga, Land of Souls - François Girard (Canada)
- In the Fade - Fatih Akin (Germany/France)
- The Intruder - Leonardo DI COSTANZO (Italy/Switzerland/France)
- Jeannette: The Childhood of Joan of Arc - Bruno Dumont (France)
- Jupiter's Moon - Kornél Mundruczó (Hungary/Germany)
- The Last Suit - Pablo SOLARZ (Argentina/Spain)
- The Leisure Seeker - Paolo Virzì (United States/France/Italy)
- Let the Sunshine In - Claire Denis (France)
- The Lion Sleeps Tonight - Nobuhiro Suwa (Japan/France)
- Longing - Savi Gabizon (Israel)
- Loveless - Andrey Zvyagintsev (Russia/France/Belgium/Germany)
- The Motive - Manuel MARTÍN CUENCA (Spain)
- The Mountain Between Us - Hany Abu-Assad (United States)
- Orchestra Class - Rachid HAMI (France)
- The Other Side of Hope - Aki Kaurismäki (Finland/Germany)
- Platoon - Oliver Stone (United States/United Kingdom)
- Porcupine Lake - Ingrid Veninger (Canada)
- Promise at Dawn - Éric Barbier (France/Belgium)
- Rainbow - A Private Affair - Paolo TAVIANI (Italy/France)
- Rise and Fall of a Small Film Company - Jean-Luc Godard (France/Switzerland)
- Sergio & Sergei - Ernesto DARANAS (Cuba/Spain)
- The Square - Ruben Östlund (Sweden/Germany/France/Denmark)
- The Summit - Santiago Mitre (Argentina)
- Sweet Country - Warwick Thornton (Australia)
- Victoria & Abdul - Stephen Frears (United Kingdom)
- Volubilis - Faouzi Bensaïdi (Morocco/France/Qatar)
- Wonderstruck - Todd Haynes (United States)
- Zama - Lucrecia Martel (Argentina)

=== Flash Forward ===
- Beach Rats - Eliza Hittman (United States)
- Beauty and the Dogs - Kaouther Ben Hania (Tunisia/France/Sweden/Norway/Lebanon/Qatar/Switzerland)
- Bitter Flowers - Olivier Meys (Belgium/France/Switzerland/China)
- The Desert Bride - Cecilia ATÁN, Valeria PIVATO (Argentina/Chile)
- Five Fingers for Marseilles - Michael MATTHEWS (South Africa)
- Gabriel and the Mountain - Fellipe GAMARANO BARBOSA (Brazil/France)
- God's Own Country - (United Kingdom)
- Goliath - Dominik LOCHER (Switzerland)
- Head. Two Ears - Vitaly SUSLIN (Russia)
- Home Team - Carlos MORELLI (Uruguay/Argentina/Brazil)
- I Am Not a Witch - Rungano NYONI (United Kingdom/France)
- Life Guidance - Ruth Mader (Austria)
- Little Crusader - Václav Kadrnka (Czech Republic/Slovak Republic/Italy)
- M.F.A. - Natalia Leite (United States)
- The Man with the Magic Box - Bodo Kox (Poland/Italy)
- Manuel - Dario ALBERTINI (Italy)
- Men Don't Cry - Alen DRLJEVIĆ (Bosnia and Herzegovina/Slovenia/Croatia/Germany)
- Montparnasse Bienvenüe - Léonor SERRAILLE (France)
- More - Onur SAYLAK (Turkey)
- Never Steady, Never Still - Kathleen Hepburn (Canada)
- The Nothing Factory - Pedro PINHO (Portugal)
- Oblivion Verses - Alireza Khatami (France/Germany/Netherlands/Chile)
- Okafor's Law - Omoni Oboli (Nigeria)
- Pulse - Stevie CRUZ-MARTIN (Australia)
- Ravens - Jens Assur (Sweden)
- Soldiers. Story from Ferentari - Ivana MLADENOVIC (Romania/Serbia/Belgium)
- Summer 1993 - Carla SIMÓN (Spain)
- The Testament - Amichai GREENBERG (Israel/Austria)
- Tom of Finland - Dome Karukoski (Finland/United States)
- Under the Family Tree - Constanze KNOCHE (Germany/Poland)
- Upside Down - Hugo MARTINS (Portugal)
- Veleno - Diego OLIVARES (Italy)
- Violeta at Last - Hilda HIDALGO (Costa Rica/Mexico)
- Where the Shadows Fall - Valentina PEDICINI (Italy)
- Wind Traces - Jimena MONTEMAYOR (Mexico)
- Winter Brothers - Hlynur PÁLMASON (Denmark/Iceland)
- A Worthy Companion - Carlos and Jason Sanchez (Canada)

=== Wide Angle ===
==== Korean Short Film Competition ====
- Away from Home - LEE Hyebeen, IM Soojin (Korea)
- Beloved - LIM Seungmi (Korea)
- Bright Future - HUR Jungjae (Korea)
- Freeway - HWANG Seulgi (Korea)
- A Friend Holding Crutches - KIM Soyeon (Korea)
- Goner - KIM Hanra (Korea)
- A Hand-written Poster - KWAK Eunmi (Korea)
- The History of Hormone - PARK Jonghyun (Korea)
- Illegal Parking - LEE Inhyuk (Korea)
- Love Jo. Right Now. - JEONG Gayoung (Korea)
- My Father in a Suitcase - KIMO Jisook (Korea)
- Ordinary People - KIM Moonkyeong (Korea)
- Playground - CHOI Cho-ah (Korea)
- The Virgin Flight - HAN Seungju (Korea)
- Yuri in Summer - KIM Seohyeon (Korea)

==== Asian Short Film Competition ====
- Cemetery of Courtesy - CHONG Keat Aun (Malaysia)
- Chronicle of a Durian - YANG Xiao (China)
- A Curious Girl - Rajesh Prasad KHATRI (Nepal)
- The Day I Am Gonna Come - HONG Cheng (China)
- Madonna - Sinung WINAHYOKO (Indonesia)
- Myth - HAO Fang-Wei (Taiwan)
- NAGISA - KOGAHARA Takeshi (Japan)
- The Road - Arash KHAYATAN (Iran)
- Suerte - Carlo FAJARDA (Philippines)
- Two Brothers - Raghbir SINGH (India)

==== Short Film Showcase ====
- 667 - LIAO Jiekai, HE Shuming, Boo Junfeng, CHONG Jun, Kirsten TAN, Eva TANG (Singapore)
- Braguino - Clément COGITORE (France)
- Death of the Sound Man - Sorayos PRAPAPAN (Thailand/Myanmar)
- Gaze - Farnoosh SAMADI (Iran/Italy)
- A Gentle Night - QIU Yang (China)
- Jodilerks Dela Cruz, Employee of the Month - Carlo Francisco MANATAD (Philippines/Singapore)
- Tshweesh - Feyrouz SERHAL (Lebanon/Germany/Spain/Qatar)
- Where Has Time Gone? - Walter Salles, Alexey FEDORCHENKO, Madhur Bhandarkar, Jia Zhangke, Jahmil X.T. QUBEKA (China/Brazil/Russia/India/South Africa)

==== Documentary Competition ====
- Ha Dong Chae Bok: A Song of Two Humans - NAM Seungsuk (Korea)
- I've Got a Little Problem - ZHANG Ximing (China)
- I Want to Go Home - Wesley Leon AROOZOO (Singapore/Japan)
- In the Claws of a Century Wanting - Jewel MARANAN (Philippines/Germany/Qatar)
- Letters - YUN Jéro, Marte VOLD (Korea/Norway)
- REBORN - IM Heungsoon (Korea)
- Sennan Asbestos Disaster - Kazuo Hara (Japan)
- Soseongri - PARK Baeil (Korea)
- Tarling is Darling - Ismail Fahmi LUBIS (Indonesia)
- The Whispering Trees - HEO Chulnyung (Korea)

==== Documentary Showcase ====
- After Chosun - MUN Jeonghyun (Korea)
- Behrouz: A Legend on Screen - Sepehr MIKAILIAN (United States)
- Blood Amber - LEE Yong Chao (Taiwan/Myanmar)
- A Cambodian Spring - Chris Kelly (Cambodia/United Kingdom/Ireland/Canada)
- Courtesy to the Nation - GWON Gyungwon (Korea)
- Ecology in Concrete - Jeong Jae-eun (Korea)
- Ex Libris: The New York Public Library - Frederick Wiseman (United States)
- A Feeling Greater Than Love - Mary JIRMANUS SABA (Lebanon)
- A Free Man - Andreas HARTMANN (Germany/Japan)
- Goodbye My Love North Korea - KIM Soyoung (Korea)
- Hugo - Wojciech KLIMALA (Poland)
- I've Got the Blues - Angie CHEN (Hong Kong, China/France)
- A Little Wisdom - KANG Yuqi (Nepal/Canada/China)
- Makala - Emmanuel GRAS (France)
- Mountain - Jennifer Peedom (Australia)
- Mrs. Fang - Wang Bing (Hong Kong, China/France/Germany)
- Vibration: THE YELLOW MONKEY - MATSUNAGA Daishi (Japan)
- The Work - Gethin ALDOUS, Jairus MCLEARY (United States)

==== Cinekids ====
- Alice in Wonderland - Clyde Geronimi, Hamilton Luske, Wilfred Jackson (United States)
- Bamse and the Witch's Daughter - Christian RYLTENIUS (Sweden)
- Finding Nemo - Andrew Stanton (United States)
- Lila's Book - Marcela RINCÓN GONZÁLEZ (Colombia/Uruguay)
- One Hundred and One Dalmatians - Clyde Geronimi, Hamilton Luske, Wolfgang Reitherman (United States)

==== Animation Showcase ====
- Have a Nice Day - LIU Jian (China)
- Lu Over the Wall - Masaaki Yuasa (Japan)
- Mary and the Witch's Flower - Hiromasa Yonebayashi (Japan)
- The Night Is Short, Walk on Girl - Masaaki Yuasa (Japan)
- On Happiness Road - SUNG Hsin-Yin (Taiwan)
- Ping Pong The Animation - Masaaki Yuasa (Japan)
- Tehran Taboo - Ali SOOZANDEH (Austria/Germany)
- The Tatami Galaxy - Masaaki Yuasa (Japan)

=== Open Cinema ===
- Fireworks, Should We See It from the Side or the Bottom? - Akiyuki Shinbo (Japan)
- Let Me Eat Your Pancreas - Sho Tsukikawa (Japan)
- Salyut-7 - Klim SHIPENKO (Russia)
- The Shape of Water - Guillermo del Toro (United States)
- Tomorrow and Thereafter - Noémie Lvovsky (France)
- Zombillenium - Arthur DE PINS, Alexis DUCORD (France/Belgium)

=== Special Programs in Focus ===
==== Suzuki Seijun: A Drifter across the Lines List ====
- Branded to Kill - Seijun Suzuki (Japan)
- Gate of Flesh - Seijun Suzuki (Japan)
- Kagero-za - Seijun Suzuki (Japan)
- Pistol Opera - Seijun Suzuki (Japan)
- Tokyo Drifter - Seijun Suzuki (Japan)
- Yumeji - Seijun Suzuki (Japan)
- Zigeunerweisen - Seijun Suzuki (Japan)

==== Sakha Cinema: World of Magical Nature and Myth ====
- 24 Snow - Mikhail BARYNIN (Russia)
- Deliverance - Gennady BAGYNANOV (Russia)
- Fisherman - Vyacheslav SEMYONOV (Russia)
- His Daughter - Tatyana EVERSTOVA (Russia)
- Keskil 2: Rematch - Dmitry SHADRIN, Alexey EGOROV, Roman DOROFEYEV (Russia)
- Mappa - Alexey ROMANOV (Russia)
- Outlaw - Stepan BURNASHOV (Russia)
- Premonition - Mikhail LUKACHEVSKY, Prokopy NOGOVITSYN (Russia)
- Summer Homestead - Anatoly Vasiliev (Russia)
- The Marvelous Time - Nikita ARZHAKOV (Russia)
- While There Is Wind - Sergey POTAPOV (Russia)
- Wooden Horse - Prokopy NOGOVITSYN (Russia)

=== Midnight Passion ===
- The Brink - Jonathan LI (Hong Kong, China)
- Downrange - Ryuhei Kitamura (Japan/United States)
- Ghost Stories - Andy Nyman, Jeremy Dyson (United Kingdom)
- It Stains the Sands Red - Colin Minihan (United States)
- Mayhem - Joe Lynch (United States)
- Parado - Wilson Yip (Hong Kong, China)
- ROKUROKU: The Promise of the Witch - Keita Amemiya (Japan)
- Sweet Virginia - Jamie M. Dagg (United States/Canada)
- TOKYO VAMPIRE HOTEL - Sion Sono (Japan)

=== Closing ===
- Love Education - Sylvia Chang (Taiwan)

== Awards ==
- New Currents Award
  - After My Death - Kim Ui-seok (Korea)
  - Blockage - Mohsen GHARAEI (Iran)
- BIFF Mecenat Award
  - Soseongri - PARK Baeil (Korea)
  - Sennan Asbestos Disaster - Kazuo Hara (Japan)
- Sonje Award
  - A Hand-written Poster - KWAK Eunmi (Korea)
  - Madonna - Sinung WINAHYOKO (Indonesia)
- Actor & Actress of the Year Award
  - Hit the Night - Park Jong-hwan (Korea)
  - After My Death - Jeon Yeo-been (Korea)
- FIPRESCI Award
  - Last Child - SHIN Dongseok (Korea)
- NETPAC Award
  - February - KIM Joonghyun (Korea)
- Kim Jiseok Award
  - Malila: The Farewell Flower - Anucha BOONYAWATANA (Thailand)
  - The Scythian Lamb - Daihachi Yoshida (Japan)
- KNN Award
  - End of Summer - Zhou Quan (China)
- Busan Bank Award
  - Pulse - Stevie CRUZ-MARTIN (Australia)
- Citizen Critics' Award
  - Possible Faces - LEE Kanghyun (Korea)
- Busan Cinephile Award
  - A Free Man - Andreas HARTMANN (Germany/Japan)
- CGV Arthouse Award
  - Microhabitat - JEON Gowoon (Korea)
- Vision-Director's Award
  - February - KIM Joonghyun (Korea)
  - Hit the Night - JEONG Gayoung (Korea)
- The Asian Filmmaker of the Year
  - Seijun Suzuki (Japan)
- Korean Cinema Award
  - Christoph Terhechte (Germany)
