= Hit the Night =

- Directed by: Jeong Ga-young
- Screenplay by: Jeong Ga-young
- Starring: Jeong Ga-young; Park Jong-hwan; Hyung Seul-woo
- Cinematography: Sun Jong-hoon
- Edited by: Eom Yun-ju
- Music by: Ahn Ji-hong
- Release dates: October 2017 (BIFF); 2018 (IFFR)
- Running time: 85 minutes
- Country: South Korea
- Language: Korean

Hit the Night (Korean: 밤치기; RR: Bamchigi) is a 2017 South Korean melodrama romance film directed by Jeong Ga-young. It made its world premiere at the 22nd Busan International Film Festival, winning Actor of the Year Award (for Park Jong-hwan) and Vision-Director's Award.

== Synopsis ==
Ga-yeong (Jeong Ga-young), a young filmmaker, tries to seduce Jin-hyeok (Park Jong-hwan) under the pretext of doing a research for her script.

== Cast ==
- Jeong Ga-young as Ga-yeong
- Park Jong-hwan as Jin-hyeok
- Hyung Seul-woo as Jin-hyeok's friend

== Awards and nominations ==
Year	Award	Category	Recipient	Result
2017	22nd Busan International Film Festival	Actor of the Year Award	Park Jong-hwan	Won
2017	22nd Busan International Film Festival	Vision-Director's Award	Jeong Ga-young	Won
