= The Bad Kids (TV series) =

2020 Chinese television series

- Promotional poster
- Also known as: Cat's Cradle
- Traditional Chinese: 隱秘的角落
- Simplified Chinese: 隐秘的角落
- Literal meaning: Hidden Corners
- Hanyu Pinyin: Yǐnmì De Jiǎoluò
- Genre: Suspense film Crime film
- Based on: Bad Kid (坏小孩) by Zi Jinchen
- Written by: Hu Kun; Pan Yiran; Sun Haoyang
- Directed by: Xin Shuang
- Starring: Qin Hao; Wang Jingchun; Rong Zishan; Shi Pengyuan; Wang Shengdi; Zhang Songwen; Liu Lin
- Composers: Ding Ke; Xin Shuang
- Country of origin: China
- Original languages: Mandarin; Cantonese
- No. of episodes: 12

Production
- Executive producers: Han Sanping; Dai Ying; He Jungyi
- Producers: Bian Jing; Lu Jing; Du Xiangyu
- Camera setup: Multi-camera
- Running time: Varies per episode
- Production company: Wannian Pictures

Original release
- Network: iQiyi
- Release: June 16 – June 25, 2020

The Bad Kids (Chinese: 隐秘的角落; pinyin: Yǐnmì De Jiǎoluò) is a 2020 Chinese streaming television series that premiered on iQiyi on June 16, 2020, which tells a story of the web of consequences birthed among different families after three children accidentally film a murder. It is directed by Xin Shuang, and features an ensemble cast that includes Qin Hao, Wang Jingchun, Zhang Songwen, Liu Lin and Lu Fangsheng, with special starring by Rong Zishan, Shi Pengyuan and Wang Shengdi.

The series was adapted from Zijin Chen's 2014 novel, Bad Kid (坏小孩). It is the second drama as part of iQiyi's Mist Theater (迷雾剧场), after Kidnapping Game.

== Plot ==
Fifteen-year-old Zhu Chaoyang is a young boy who excels academically, but he is detested by others for his cold demeanor. His parents are divorced and he is generally left to fend for himself. His mother, Zhou Chunhong, is often gone for work at a resort. He has a poor relationship with his father, Zhu Yongping, his step-mother, Wang Yao, and his half-sister, Zhu Jingjing.

Chaoyang is approached by Yan Liang, his former primary school acquaintance. Liang introduces Chaoyang to a younger girl named Yue Pu (nicknamed Pupu). The two escaped from a welfare house. Liang's father was a criminal and former drug addict who now lives in a mental hospital. Pupu is an orphan who needs 300,000 yuan to treat her younger brother's leukemia. Chaoyang agrees to let them stay in his apartment while his mother is at work.

Chen Guansheng is a police officer about to retire. He arrested Liang's father years ago and, as a result, he feels a bit of responsibility for Liang. Guansheng is on the trail of Liang and Pupu, but consistently one step behind.

Zhang Dongsheng is a teacher whose wife, Xu Jing, wants a divorce. He takes his in-laws to Mount Liufeng and asks them to help him fix his marriage, but they refuse. Enraged, Dongsheng pushes them off a cliff to their deaths. The three kids accidentally record this crime while visiting the mountain to take pictures. The trio decide to trade the footage with Dongsheng in exchange for 300,000 yuan. Dongsheng says he doesn't have the money but offers them 30,000 yuan upfront with payments to come later.

Jingjing falls to her death from the fifth floor when Pupu and Chaoyang are present. However, Chaoyang claims to have not witnessed the event out of fear of being blamed. Wang Yao's gangster brother, Wang Li, learns of Jingjing's death. He kidnaps Chaoyang and tries to torture a confession out of the boy. Dongsheng tries to steal Wang Li's car keys to retrieve the 30,000 yuan he gave the children. However, he is caught by Wang Li and so Dongshang stabs him to death. Chaoyang is found by Yongping and Wang Yao, who take him to the hospital.

Pupu eventually begins to trust Dongsheng after he saved Chaoyang and let her and Liang stay at his apartment during a typhoon. Dongsheng gives the kids 300,000 yuan he borrows from a loan shark but overhears Liang telling Chaoyang that he will keep backup footage of the murders. Dongsheng forces Liang to give him the backup but finds that it is fake. As a result, he hesitates to save Pupu during an asthma attack and puts her in danger of dying of asphyxiation.

Wang Yao and Yongping return to the factory to look for Wang Li but are attacked and murdered by Dongsheng. Chaoyang and Liang also arrive at the factory to search for Pupu, but fail to find her. Dongsheng burns down the building and escapes. Chaoyang and Liang decide to finally report Dongsheng.

The boys arrange a meeting with Dongsheng on an old ship. Liang sends a letter to Guansheng about Dongsheng's crimes and the 300,000 yuan to save Pupu's brother. The two boys confront Dongsheng, and he tells Chaoyang to stab him. Chaoyang hesitates and stabs Dongsheng in the shoulder but not in the heart. Dongsheng reveals Pupu is alive and safe in the hospital. As Dongsheng moves to stab Chaoyang to death, he is shot to death by the police. Chaoyang returns to life as normal with his mother. Guansheng pays for Pupu's brother's medical treatment. Liang aspires to become a police officer. At Pupu's behest, Chaoyang tells the police of the true cause of Jingjing's death.

== Cast ==
- Qin Hao as Zhang Dongsheng
- Wang Jingchun as Chen Guansheng
- Rong Zishan as Zhu Chaoyang
- Shi Pengyuan as Yan Liang
- Wang Shengdi as Yue Pu
- Zhang Songwen as Zhu Yongping
- Liu Lin as Zhou Chunhong
- Lu Fangsheng as Ye Jun
- Li Meng as Wang Yao
- Huang Miyi as Xu Jing
- Li Junting as Wang Li
- Mu Liyan as Mrs. Chen
- Lin Peng as Ma Guangcai
- Chen Duoyi as Zhu Jingjing
- Ren Luomin as Xu Guangshen
- Liu Chenxia as Bi Shuxian
- Ning Li as Zhang Jinglin
- Wang Yidan as Teacher Wang
- Li Zhouwu as Le Le
- Liu Jingjing as Sister Li
- Wu Meixia as Sister Liu
- Zhou Yanyan as Ye's wife
- Huang Suiwen as Lao Zuo
- Li Xiang as Lao Hu
- Bu Wenhui as Lao Yue
- Huang Wei as Accountant Zhang
- Peng Dongxu as Zeng's father
- Zhao Qian as Zeng's mother
- Yu Yan as Teacher Tang
- Hu Chenxi as Yang Han

== Production ==
=== Filming ===
The Bad Kids was headed by the same team behind Burning Ice, which was adapted from another one of Zi Jinchen's works. In 2018, iQiyi, who owns the copyright of the original novel, contacted Wannian Pictures (whom they had previously cooperated with), in hopes of turning the novel into film and television. The people behind the scenes include photography director Li Jianing, art director Tian Zhuangzhuang, editing director Lu Di, and casting director Li Junting. Producer Lu Jing met up to 30 screenwriters for the project and settled for the final four. Pan was the first screenwriter and was responsible for the overall story and characters of the script, while Hu added the specific details. Sun Haoyang rewrote the original novel into a script outline that "retained the original author Zi Jinchen's most exciting characters and story bridges, and lay a good foundation for the entire adaptation." House of Cards screenwriter Joe Cacaci acted as script consultant.

The series was mainly shot in Zhanjiang in 75 days between June and September 2019.

=== Casting ===
The crew revealed that it took six months to cast before the filming began and selected three child actors from more than 2,000 children.

When approached for the part without the script, Qin Hao initially declined the role, remarking, "I have read the novel. If I play a child, I will play it. If I play Zhang Dongsheng, the character's motive is just for money and it's flat. I don't think it's interesting." He also admitted the decision was influenced by the fact that he now avoided villain roles after having a daughter. However, after meeting with the director and producer Lu Jing, he was convinced to take up the role.

The role Chen Guansheng was not in the original novel, and was written specifically for Wang Jingchun, who the crew wanted but could not cast for Burning Ice.

== Soundtrack ==
The Bad Kids Original Soundtrack (OST)

Soundtrack album by Ding Ke
- Released: June 23, 2020
- Genre: Electronic; Rock; Instrumental
- Language: Mandarin
- Label: Red Fire (红火火)
- Producer: Ding Ke

Each of the series' 12 episodes features its own ending theme, with the last episode's theme composed and written by director, Xin Shuang. The Bad Kids Soundtrack Album (隐秘的角落 配乐专辑) was released on June 23, 2020, and features 35 total tracks. It also includes the 11th episode ending theme, "Past, No Glory (昔日，没有光彩)".

The Bad Kids 《隐秘的角落》 Ending theme music
No.	Title	Lyrics	Music	Singer(s)	Length
1.	"Little White Boat (小白船)"	Yinke Rong	Yinke Rong	Xiaojuan & The Residents of the Valley (小娟&山谷里的居民)	2:41
2.	"Hesitation (犹豫)"	Muma木玛	Muma木玛	Muma木玛	9:04
3.	"Dancing With The Dead Lover"		The Molds	The Molds	2:47
4.	"DESCENT"		Anti-General	Anti-General	3:26
5.	"Thy Name (因你之名)"	P.K. 14	P.K. 14	P.K. 14	9:42
6.	"Hell on Earth (人间地狱)"		Anti-General	Anti-General	3:12
7.	"Lady in the Moon With Rabbit (偷月亮的人)"	Queen Sea Big Shark (后海大鲨鱼)	Queen Sea Big Shark (后海大鲨鱼)	Queen Sea Big Shark (后海大鲨鱼)	6:54
8.	"Good Night"	Joyside	Joyside	Joyside	7:54
9.	"Dying in a Rotating Apartment (死在旋转公寓)"		Xue Ran	Glow Curve (发光曲线乐队)	7:33
10.	"A Crane Smaller than a Youngster (比一个年轻人小一点的鹤)"	Who didn't come on Tuesday afternoon (周二下午谁没来)	Ding Ke	Ding Ke	5:01
11.	"Past, No Glory (昔日，没有光彩)"		Ding Ke	Ding Ke	4:32
12.	"White Boat (白船)"	Xin Shuang	Xin Shuang	Qin Hao, Wang Shengdi	3:40

== Reception ==
The series released with critical acclaim, with The Beijing News noting: "Some people say that [The Bad Kids] raises the standard of domestic suspense dramas. From narrative, art, photography to performance, it has truly improved the standard." Director and actress Zhang Ziyi praised the series' production and the actors' performances, proclaiming: "After watching American and British dramas for so many years, there is finally a "Chinese drama" whose quality can compete with them."

The Bad Kids also became a social media hit. By June 23, the series garnered 1.12 billion topic posts on Weibo, and by the 25th, trended on the site 50+ times. After broadcast, a quote by Zhang Dongsheng, "Wanna go for a hike (一起爬山吗)?", became a widely used meme and euphemism "for wishing to do someone harm". A phone case featuring the quote (meant to promote exercising and unaffiliated with the show) became a best-selling item on Taobao.

The show currently earns an 8.9 on Douban with more than 619,000 user reviews.

Variety listed The Bad Kids in second place as their "The 15 Best International Series of 2020", and gained favorable reviews for its storytelling, cinematography, performances and dark soundtrack. This series also won several awards including the Best Creative at the Asia Content Awards unit of 25th Busan International Film Festival.

== Awards and nominations ==
Award	Category	Recipient	Result	Ref.
2nd Asia Contents Awards & Global OTT Awards	Best Creative	The Bad Kids	Won	
2nd Asia Contents Awards & Global OTT Awards	Best Asian Drama	The Bad Kids	Nominated	
2nd Asia Contents Awards & Global OTT Awards	Newcomer Actor	Rong Zishan	Won	
2nd Asia Contents Awards & Global OTT Awards	Newcomer Actress	Wang Shengdi	Nominated	
2nd Asia Contents Awards & Global OTT Awards	Technical Achievement Award	Production Design	Nominated	
3rd China Television Drama Production Industry Association Awards	Outstanding Young Director	Xin Shuang	Won	
21st China Video Awards	Hot Drama of The Year	The Bad Kids	Won	
16th Chinese American Film Festival	Best Web Series	The Bad Kids	Won	
16th Chinese American Film Festival	Best Leading Actor	Qin Hao	Won	
2020 Film and Television Role Models	Quality Drama Series	The Bad Kids	Won	
2020 Film and Television Role Models	Best Supporting Actor	Rong Zishan	Won	
2020 Film and Television Role Models	Drama Director of the Year	Xin Shuang	Won	
2020 Film and Television Role Models	Producer of the Year	Dai Ying	Won	
2020 Film and Television Role Models	Screenwriter of the Year	Hu Kun, Pan Yiran, Sun Haoyang	Won	
2nd Fusion Screen Communication	Episodes of Fusion Screening Era	The Bad Kids	Won	
5th Golden Guduo Network Film and Television Festival	Influential Web Drama of The Year	The Bad Kids	Won	
29th Huading Awards	Top Television Series	The Bad Kids	Won (1st Place)	
29th Huading Awards	Best Producer for a Television Series	Dai Ying, He JunYi	Nominated	
29th Huading Awards	Best Directing for a Television Series	Xin Shuang	Nominated	
29th Huading Awards	Best Actor in a Television Series	Qin Hao	Nominated	
29th Huading Awards	Audience's Favorite TV Actor	Qin Hao	Won	
29th Huading Awards	Best Supporting Actress in a Television Series	Liu Lin	Won	
29th Huading Awards	Best Supporting Actor in a Television Series	Zhang Songwen	Nominated	
29th Huading Awards	Best New Performer in a Television Series	Rong Zishan	Nominated	
29th Huading Awards	Best Writing for a Television Series	Pan Yiran, Hu Kun, Sun Haoyang	Nominated	
2020 IFeng Film and TV Awards	Best Television Series	The Bad Kids	Nominated	
2020 IFeng Film and TV Awards	Best Actor in a Television Series	Qin Hao	Nominated	
2020 IFeng Film and TV Awards	Best Actress in a Television Series	Liu Lin	Won	
4th Internet Film Festival	Best Drama of The Year	The Bad Kids	Won	
4th Internet Film Festival	Best Director of The Year (Drama)	Xin Shuang	Won	
2021 iQIYI TV and Movie Awards	Drama King of the Year	The Bad Kids	Won	
2021 iQIYI TV and Movie Awards	Actor of The Year	Qin Hao	Won	
2021 iQIYI TV and Movie Awards	Most Potential Actor of The Year	Rong Zishan	Won	
2021 iQIYI TV and Movie Awards	Most Potential Actor of The Year	Wang Shengdi	Won	
2021 iQIYI TV and Movie Awards	Most Potential Actor of The Year	Shi Pengyuan	Won	
16th Seoul International Drama Awards	Best Mini Series	The Bad Kids	Won	
16th Seoul International Drama Awards	Best Director	Xin Shuang	Nominated	
2020 Sohu Fashion Awards	National Drama of The Year	The Bad Kids	Won	
2020 Sohu Fashion Awards	National Drama Male Star of the Year	Qin Hao	Won	
2020 Sina Weibo Night	Weibo Hot Drama of the Year	The Bad Kids	Won	
3rd Sir Movie Cultural And Entertainment Industry Awards	Best Director in a Television Series	Xin Shuang	Won	
3rd Sir Movie Cultural And Entertainment Industry Awards	Best Leading Actor in a Television Series	Qin Hao	Won	
3rd Sir Movie Cultural And Entertainment Industry Awards	Best Sound in a Television Series	Zhang Nan	Won	
3rd Sir Movie Cultural And Entertainment Industry Awards	Best Casting in a Television Series	Qin Hao, Wang Jingchun, Rong Zishan, Shi Pengyuan, Wang Shengdi, Zhang Songwen, Liu Lin, Lu Fangsheng, Meng Li, Huang Miyi	Won	
2020 Super Red Man Festival	Most Influential TV Series on Weibo 2020	The Bad Kids	Won	
7th The Actors of China Award	Best Performance by an Actor-Internet Drama	Qin Hao	Nominated	
7th The Actors of China Award	Best Performance by an Actress-Internet Drama	Liu Lin	Nominated	
2020 TikTok Star Motion Night	Actor of The Year	Qin Hao	Won	
2020 TikTok Entertainment Awards	TikTok Quality Drama Series of the Year	The Bad Kids	Won	
2020 Toutiao Entertainment Awards	New Star of The Year	Rong Zishan	Won	
3rd True Aspiration Awards	Top 5 Young Directors of The Year	Xin Shuang	Won	
3rd True Aspiration Awards	Outstanding Platform Producer of The Year	Bian Jiang	Won	
7th WenRong Awards	Best Net Drama	The Bad Kids	Won	
2020 Zhihu Little Blue Star Filmmaker of the Year	Best Director TV Series	Xin Shuang	Won	
2020 Zhihu Little Blue Star Filmmaker of the Year	Best Actor TV Series	Qin Hao	Won	
2020 Zhihu Little Blue Star Filmmaker of the Year	Best Actress TV Series	Liu Lin	Won	
