= I Want to Go Home (2017 film) =

2017 Singaporean-Japanese documentary)

- Directed by: Wesley Leon Aroozoo
- Produced by: Ho Shengjuan; Wesley Leon Aroozoo
- Release dates: October 2017 (BIFF); December 2, 2017 (SGIFF)
- Running time: 60 minutes
- Countries: Singapore, Japan
- Language: Japanese

I Want to Go Home is a 2017 documentary film by filmmaker Wesley Leon Aroozoo. It made its world premiere at the 22nd Busan International Film Festival, competing for the Mecenat Award in the Wide Angle Documentary Competition, and its international premiere at the 28th Singapore International Film Festival in 2017. The documentary follows the story of Yasuo Takamatsu, a 58-year-old Japanese man whose wife was lost in the 2011 tsunami and has been diving every week around the small coastal town of Onagawa in search of her.

The documentary is funded by Tokyo Filmex Next Masters Program (Japan), Infocomm Media Development Authority via the Development Assistance Fund. Other companies also supported with equipment and expenses incurred.

The documentary is distributed by IMPLEO Inc (Worldwide Rights) and Golden Tree (Mainland China Rights).

The documentary is also paired with a novel of the same name, written by Aroozoo, which he wrote about Takamatsu's life and his journey to meet Takamatsu. The novel was published in both English and Japanese by Math Paper Press.

In 2021, I Want to Go Home was transformed into an interactive art installation by Mural Lingo for Open Books at the Arts House as part of the Light to Nights Festival in Singapore.
