= Park Jong-hwan (actor) =

South Korean actor

- Born: 7 September 1982 (age 44); South Korea
- Occupation: Actor
- Agent: Plum Actors

Korean name
- Hangul: 박종환
- RR: Bak Jonghwan
- MR: Pak Chonghwan

Park Jong-hwan (born 7 September 1982) is a South Korean actor. He is best known for his role as Byeon Deuk-jong in the psychological thriller drama Hell Is Other People.

== Personal life ==
Park studied filmmaking at the Seoul Institute of the Arts after his military service.

== Filmography ==
=== Film ===
Year	Title	Role
2010	Read My Lips	Man on the phone's voice/Director Park (voice)
2011	The Front Line	
2013	Ingtoogi: The Battle of Internet	Jin-seong, mating king
2014	Ready Action! Violence Movies	Seg. Bitter
2014	Romance in Seoul	Director
2015	Death in Desert	Director Byeong
2015	Veteran	Team leader Yang
2015	Now Playing	Jong-hwan
2016	A Violent Prosecutor	Lee Jin-seok
2016	The Boys Who Cried Wolf	Ji Wan-joo
2016	Vanishing Time: A Boy Who Returned	Jin-sung
2017	One Line	Ki-tae
2017	The Mayor	Black jacket
2017	Proj. Get-up-and-go	Ha Si-yong
2017	Hit the Night	Jin-hyeok
2018	Bullies	Teacher (Cameo)
2018	Bullies 2	Teacher (Cameo)
2019	Possible Faces	Gi-seon
2019	Birthday	Yeong-joon
2019	Maggie	Gak Granger
2019	Sub-zero Wind	Yeong-jin
2020	Fanfare	Hee-tae
2020	Recipe For Happiness	Han Hyung Woo
2020	Jazzy Misfits	Landlord's son
2021	The Cursed: Dead Man's Prey	Hyun Chul-min (Special appearance)
2022	Confidential Assignment 2: International	
2023	Conversation	Seung-jin
2023	Concrete Utopia	
2023	A Lonely Island in the Distant Sea	Sung Yoon-cheol
2025	Nocturnal	

=== Television series ===
Year	Title	Role
2012	Read My Lips	Park Jong-hwan
2012	KBS Drama Special "Art"	Jeong-hwan
2014	Flirty Boy and Girl	Producer
2015	The Lover	Park Hwan-jong
2015	The Producers	Baek Young-chan
2015	KBS Drama Special "Fake Family"	Han Yeong-jin
2016	The Cravings 2	Jong-hwan
2016	Uncontrollably Fond	
2017	Idol Fever	Township chief
2017	Green Fever	Representative Park
2018	Top Management	Kim Hyun-Jo
2019	Hell Is Other People	Byeon Deuk-jong / Byeon Deuk-soo
2020	Dr. Romantic 2	Im Hyun-joon
2022	Juvenile Justice	Go Gang-sik
2023	Taxi Driver 2	Park Hyeon-jo

== Awards and nominations ==
Year	Award	Category	Nominated work	Result
2016	25th Buil Film Awards	Best New Actor	The Boys Who Cried Wolf	Nominated
2017	22nd Chunsa Film Art Awards	Best New Actor	The Boys Who Cried Wolf	Nominated
2017	4th Wildflower Film Awards	Best Actor	The Boys Who Cried Wolf	Won
2017	22nd Busan International Film Festival	Actor of the Year Award	Hit the Night	Won
2023	24th Busan Film Critics Awards	Best Actor	A Lonely Island in the Distant Sea	Won
