= Rong Zishan =

Chinese actor

- 荣梓杉
- Born: 3 February 2006 (age 20); Mianyang, Sichuan, China
- Occupations: Actor; Model
- Years active: 2014–present
- Modeling information
- Height: 6.0 ft (183 cm)
- Hair color: Black
- Eye color: Brown
- Agency: As One Production

Chinese name
- Traditional Chinese: 榮梓杉
- Simplified Chinese: 荣梓杉
Transcriptions
Standard Mandarin
- Hanyu Pinyin: Róng Zǐshān

Rong Zishan is a Chinese actor and model, best known for his portrayal of Dollar Zhang in Mountains May Depart and Zhu Chaoyang in The Bad Kids.

== Personal life ==
Rong was born on February 3, 2006, in Mianyang, Sichuan, and grew up in Suzhou, Jiangsu.

== Career ==
Early in the 2010s, Rong debuted in a KFC commercial.

In 2014, Rong contested in a children's runway model show and was the winner of the Suzhou Division.

He was cast in Jia Zhangke's 8th feature movie Mountains May Depart, which competed for the Palme d'Or at the 2015 Cannes Film Festival.

Rong has received popular recognition in China for his starring role as Zhu Chaoyang in the iQIYI Light On Series: The Bad Kids, aired in June 2020.

In October 2020, he won the "Newcomer Actor Award" at the 2nd Asian Content Awards of the Busan International Film Festival.

In December 2020, he was awarded, together with two other child actors Shi Pengyuan and Wang Shengdi, Upcoming Drama Actors of the Year for 2021 iQIYI Scream Night for their roles in The Bad Kids. Rong also picked up Upcoming New Film Actor of the Year Award for his role in Let Life Be Beautiful.

On July 15, 2022, the sci-fi movie Mozart From Space starring Rong and Huang Bo was released. In September, the network security-themed web drama Are You Safe? and the TV series The Examination for Everyone starring him was broadcast, in which he played Zhou You and Wu Jiajun, respectively. On November 4, he won the Most Promising Actor Award at the 4th InStyle Icon Awards Annual Idol Ceremony.

In January 2023, he participated in the 2023 China Central Television Spring Festival Gala and starred in the micro-film Me and My Spring Festival Gala. He appeared in the urban drama Turn On The Right Way Of Life. On February 5, he sang in the 2023 China Central Television Lantern Festival Gala.

== Filmography ==
=== Film ===
Year	Title	Chinese title	Role	Ref.
2015	Mountains May Depart	山河故人	Dollar Zhang (Young)	
2017	Secret Fruit	秘果	Duan Bowen(Young)	
2017	End of Summer	西小河的夏天	Gu Xiaoyang	
2018	Dawning	云上日出	Xia Jiajun	
2020	Let Life Be Beautiful	再见吧！少年	Wang Xinyang	
2021	Home Sweet Home	秘密访客	Wang Chuqi	
2022	Mozart from Space	外太空的莫扎特	Ren Xiaotian	

=== Television/Web series ===
Year	Title	Chinese title	Role	Notes	Ref.
2015	Love and Hatred of Snow	深宅雪	A Ping (Young)		
2016	First Love	柠檬初上	Hu Fei		
2016	The Lover's Lies	爱人的谎言	Xiao Pi		
2016	The Whirlwind Girl (Season 2)	旋风少女2	Xing Yao		
2016	Demon Girl (Season 2)	半妖倾城2	Fu Xingbang (Young)	Web series	
2016	With You	最好的我们	Lin Fan		
2017	Song of Phoenix	思美人	Feng Ming		
2017	The Advisors Alliance	大军师司马懿	Sima Shi (Young)		
2017	Nothing Gold Can Stay	那年花开月正圆	Du Mingli (Young)		
2017	Legend of Heavenly Tear: Phoenix Warriors	天泪传奇之凤凰无双	Xiao Fengming (Young)		
2017	Princess Agents	楚乔传	Yan Xun (Young)		
2018	Beauties in the Closet	柜中美人	Hua Wuhuan (young)		
2018	The Legend of Dugu	独孤天下	Li Yuan (Young)		
2018	Only Side by Side with You	南方有乔木	Xiao Si		
2018	Cinderella Chef	萌妻食神	Bai Zhenzhu	Web series	
2018	Meet in Youth Love in Foods	像我们一样年轻	Gao Xing (Young)		
2018	Swords of Legends II	古剑奇谭2	Ba Ye	Web series	
2018	Ruyi's Royal Love in the Palace	如懿传	Yong Cheng (Young)		
2019	In Law We Believe	因法之名	Xu Zimeng (Young)		
2019	Kiss, Love and Taste	亲·爱的味道	An Wenyu (Young)		
2019	Who's not Rebellious Youth	谁的青春不叛逆	Lu Xiang (Young)		
2020	Eternal Love of Dream	三生三世枕上书	Chen Ye (Young)		
2020	The Bad Kids	隐秘的角落	Zhu Chaoyang	Web series	
2021	Faith Makes Great	理想照耀中国	Da Hai		
2021	The Answer Of Time	时间的答卷	Long Siquan		
2021	Snow Sword Stride	雪中悍刀行	Xu Longxiang		
2021	Passage of My Youth / Love Story in London	岁月忽已暮	Gu Xinglie(Young)		
2022	Are you safe	你安全吗？	Zhou You	Web Series	
2022	The Examination for Everyone	大考	Wu Jiajun		
2023	Turn on the Right Way Of Life	打开生活的正确方式	Bian Xiaofang		
TBA	The Rhapsody of A Summer Dream	夏梦狂诗曲	Ke Ze	Shot in 2016	
TBA	Live Long and Prosper	咸鱼飞升	Meng Heze		

=== Variety show ===
Year	Title	Chinese title	Role	Ref.
2015	Really! It's fun!	真的！很好玩	Guest	
2020	Suning 818 Super Show	东方卫视818超级秀	Cast member	
2020	Day Day Up	天天向上	Guest	
2020	2020 National Day Present · Mid-autumn Festival Night at Hunan Television	2020国庆献礼·湖南卫视蓝月亮中秋之夜	Cast member	
2021	2021 iQIYI Shout Out For Love GALA	2021爱奇艺为爱尖叫晚会	Cast member	
2021	2021 Weibo Movie Night	2021微博电影之夜	Guest	
2021	Hi Directors	导演请指教	Cast member	
2022	Hello Saturday	你好，星期六	Guest	
2023	Memories Beyond Horizon	无限超越班	Cast member	

=== Music video appearances ===
Year	Title	Chinese Title	Singer	Ref.
2020	Wings	翅膀(逆风版)	Rong Zishan & Xie Keyin	
2021	Home Sweet Home	甜蜜的家	Rong Zishan, Shi Pengyuan & Wang Shengdi	
2021	You Will Find The Answer	你会找到答案	Rong Zishan	

=== Stage play ===
Year	Title	Chinese Title	Role	Ref.
2020	Weishan Lake + Important Mission	微山湖 + 重任	Xiao Pu	
2020	The Bad Kids special episode "echo"	隐秘的角落番外《回响》	Zhu Chaoyang	
2022	The 17th Changchun Film Festival	第十七届中国长春电影节颁奖典礼	Singer	
2023	China Central Television Spring Festival Gala	中国中央电视台春节联欢晚会	Actor	
2023	Lantern Festival Gala	中国中央电视台元宵晚会	Singer	
2023	Television Series of China Quality Ceremony	剧耀东方·2023电视剧品质盛典	Singer	

== Discography ==
=== Single ===
Year	Title	Chinese title	Album	Notes
2020	Wings	翅膀	N/A	Solo ver. of the promotion song for movie Let Life Be Beautiful
2021	You Will Find The Answer	你会找到答案	N/A	Promotion song for movie Little Canned Men

=== Collaboration ===
Year	Title	Chinese title	Album	Notes
2020	Wings (feat. Xie Keyin)	翅膀(逆风版)	N/A	Promotion song for movie Let Life Be Beautiful
2020	When I Grow Up (feat. Gu Yuhan)	当我长大	N/A	Song from movie Let Life Be Beautiful
2021	Home Sweet Home	甜蜜的家	N/A	Promotion song for movie Home Sweet Home

== Magazine modeling ==
Year	Magazine (in English)	Magazine (in Chinese)	Issue	Photographer	Notes	Ref.
2020	ESQURIEfine	时尚先生fine	August	Oliver June	Inside pages	
2020	Men's uno Young！	风度men's uno Young！	August	Xiaoming	Cover & Inside pages	
2020	ELLEMEN Fresh	ELLEMEN 新青年	2020 Anniversary Edition (2020周年刊)	Chang Xiuyu	Inside pages	
2020	Harper's BAZAAR MEN	芭莎男士	September	Yang Wei	Inside pages	
2020	GQ	智族GQ	September	Li Xiaoliang（ASTUDIO）	Group cover & Inside pages	
2020	COSMOPOLITAN	时尚COSMO	October	Bao Yanzhou, Qiao Dacai, Ma Chicheng (aAstudio）, Meng Tian	Inside pages	
2020	LEON	男人风尚LEON	October	Ren Shenyun	Group cover & Inside pages	
2021	À PART CONNEXION	À PART CONNEXION	Été 2021 Numéro 1	Chen Lingyu	Inside pages	
2021	STARBOX MAGAZINE	STARBOX MAGAZINE	30	Yang Yishao	Cover & Inside pages	
2021	TRENDMO MEN	TRENDMO MEN	May	Shi Shaoyuan	Cover & Inside pages	
2022	ELLE MEN	睿士ELLE MEN	October	Zelin	Cover & Inside pages	
2022	Men's uno Young！	风度men's uno Young！	October	Andy Lee	Cover & Inside pages	
2022	InStyle ICON	InStyle ICON	726&727	Song Wanjie	Cover & Inside pages	
2023	Condé Nast Traveler	悦游中国	Jan&Feb	Kisshomaru Shimamura	Cover & Inside pages	
2023	Harper's BAZAAR MEN	芭莎男士	March	Yu Xiang	Inside pages	

== Awards and nominations ==
Year	Association	Category	Nominated work	Result	Ref.
2018	The 5th Beijing Youth Film Festival	Actor of the Year	End of Summer	Nominated	
2019	The 52nd WorldFest-Houston Mid-Fest	Rising Star	Dawning	Nominated	
2020	2nd Asia Contents Awards at Busan International Film Festival	Newcomer Actor Award	The Bad Kids	Won	
2020	iQIYI Scream Night 2020	Upcoming Drama Actors of the Year	The Bad Kids	Won	
2020	iQIYI Scream Night 2020	Upcoming New Film Actor of the Year	Let Life Be Beautiful	Won	
2020	2020 Douban Movies of the Year	Actors of Most Concern (Top 10)		Won	
2021	Madame Figaro Fashion Gala	Popular Newcomer Actor of The Year		Won	
2021	2021 Weibo Movie Night	Most Promising Actors		Won	
2022	2022 InStyle Icon Awards	Most Promising Actors		Won	
2023	China Central Radio and Television's 1st Annual Chinese TV Drama Ceremony	Breakthrough Actor of the Year	The Examination for Everyone	Won	
2023	Television Series of China Quality Ceremony	Quality Newcomer		Won	
