= End of Summer (2017 film) =

- Film poster
- Traditional Chinese: 西小河的夏天
- Simplified Chinese: 西小河的夏天
- Directed by: Zhou Quan
- Screenplay by: Huang Yimei
- Produced by: Jacqueline Liu
- Starring: Rong Zishan; Ku Pao-ming; Zhang Songwen
- Cinematography: Michael Solidum
- Edited by: Kong Jinlei
- Music by: Lim Giong
- Production companies: Each Other Films; Ethan Culture Development Company
- Release dates: October 2017 (BIFF); 25 May 2018 (China)
- Running time: 102 minutes
- Country: China
- Language: Mandarin

End of Summer (Chinese: 西小河的夏天) is a 2017 Chinese drama film by first-time director Zhou Quan. It made its world premiere in the New Currents section of the 22nd Busan International Film Festival, winning the KNN Award.

== Plot ==
Fifth-grader Gu Xiaoyang (Rong Zishan) loves soccer and wants to get onto the school's team but his teacher father Jianhua (Zhang Songwen) forbids him from playing believing study is more important.

== Cast ==
- Rong Zishan as Gu Xiaoyang
- Ku Pao-ming as Grandpa Cheng
- Zhang Songwen as Gu Jianhua
- Tan Zhuo as Huifang
- Dong Qing as Miss Shen
- Zhang Liping

== Awards and nominations ==
Year	Award	Category	Recipient	Result
2015	13th Hong Kong-Asia Film Financing Forum	HAF Award	End of Summer	Won
2017	22nd Busan International Film Festival	KNN Award	End of Summer	Won
