= I Am the Actor =

- 我就是演员
- Genre: Variety show
- Directed by: Wu Tong
- Country of origin: China
- Original language: Mandarin
- No. of seasons: 1

Production
- Production location: China
- Running time: 100:00
- Production company: Zhejiang Television

Original release
- Network: Zhejiang Television
- Release: September 8, 2018 – present

Related
- The Birth of an Actor (2017)

I Am the Actor (simplified Chinese: 我就是演员; traditional Chinese: 我就是演員) is a Chinese variety program produced by Zhejiang Television. The show is hosted by Zhang Guoli and Yi Yi, and features Wu Xiubo, Xu Zheng and Zhang Ziyi as mentors. The first season of the show was called Birth of Performers, and Zhejiang TV renamed the show as I Am the Actor in the second season, which began airing in September 2018.

After becoming a hit in China, Zhejiang TV formed a partnership in November 2018 with the American company IOI (founded by Lisa Kudrow and Dan Bucatinsky) to co-produce an English version of the show for the global audience.

== Guests ==
- Episode 1:
  - Xu Jiao, Hu Xianxu
  - Ren Suxi (任素汐), Zuo Xiaoqing
  - Song Yang (宋洋), Du Chun
- Episode 2:
  - Janine Chang, Zhang Xinyu
  - Kan Qingzi (阚清子), Xu Lu
  - Tu Songyan (涂松岩), Qi Xi (齐溪)
- Episode 3:
  - Lan Xi (斓曦), Wang Yuanke (王媛可), Yang Rong
  - Jin Shijia, Song Yi (宋轶)
  - Sun Qian (孙茜), Zhang Xiaofei (张小斐)
- Episode 4:
  - Li Xiaomeng (李小萌), Li Qian
  - Li Landi (李兰迪), Han Xue
  - Li Chun, He Hongshan
- Episode 5:
  - Yang Di (杨迪), Cao Bingkun (曹炳琨), Baby Zhang, Wang Maolei (王茂蕾)
  - Hai Lu (海陆), Jiang Mengjie, Zhang Xincheng
  - Li Nian (李念), Wang Xiaochen (王晓晨)
- Episode 6:
  - Guo Qilin (郭麒麟), Jing Chao (经超), Cao Jun (曹骏)
  - Xue Jianing (薛佳凝), Cao Xiwen, Wang Yang (王阳)
- Episode 7:
  - Liu Huan, Lin Peng, Li Sheng (李晟)
  - Shen Chunyang (沉春阳), Du Ruoxi (杜若溪)
  - Sun Jian (孙坚), Zhang Meng (张萌), Tan Jianci (檀健次), Jiang Kaitong (江铠同), Fang Zibin (房子斌), Fan Tiantian (范湉湉)
- Episode 8:
  - Zhang Zhilü (张植绿), He Dujuan (何杜娟), Hong Bingyao (洪冰瑶), Shao Weitong (邵伟桐)
  - Yin Xiaotian (印小天), Han Dong (韩栋), Jia Chenfei (贾晨飞), Yu Xiaotong (于小彤)
  - Liu Yase (刘雅瑟), Gao Xiaofei (高晓菲), Tian Yuan, Wang Wanjuan (王婉娟)

== Episodes ==
Episode #	Broadcast Date	Round #	Session #	Actors	Repertoire	Roles	Result
1	8 September 2018	1-1; Actors compete	1	Xu Jiao; Hu Xianxu	Crouching Tiger, Hidden Dragon (2000)	Xu Jiao as Yu Jiaolong (玉娇龙); Hu Xianxu as Luo Xiaohu (罗小虎)	Xu Jiao wins, 212 votes to 194
1	8 September 2018	1-1; Actors compete	2	Zuo Xiaoqing; Ren Suxi	Back to 1942 (2012)	Zuo Xiaoqing as Gui Fen (桂芬); Ren Suxi as Huazhi (花枝)	Ren Suxi wins, 216 votes to 209
1	8 September 2018	1-1; Actors compete	3	Song Yang; Du Chun	The Advisors Alliance (2017)	Song Yang as Cao Zhi; Du Chun as Cao Pi	Du Chun wins, 292 votes to 128
1	8 September 2018	1-2; Actors collaborate with mentors	1	Du Chun; Zhang Ziyi	(离婚夫妻)	Du Chun as a husband (丈夫); Zhang Ziyi as a wife (妻子)	
1	8 September 2018	1-2; Actors collaborate with mentors	2	Ren Suxi; Xu Zheng	(狂笑的男人)	Ren Suxi as a passerby (路人); Xu Zheng as a man who laughs wildly (狂笑的男人)	
2	15 September 2018	1-2; Actors collaborate with mentors	3	Xu Jiao; Wu Xiubo	(失窃之后)	Xu Jiao as a thief (小偷); Wu Xiubo as a victim of theft (失窃者)	
2	15 September 2018	1-3; Chen Kaige's short film	1	Du Chun; Zhang Ziyi	(艳红)	Du Chun as Jin (金爷); Zhang Ziyi as Yan Hong (艳红); Zhou Yiwei (周一围) as Zhang Shaoqiu (张少秋)	Zhang Ziyi wins, 231 votes to 152
2	15 September 2018	2-1; Actors compete	1	Janine Chang; Zhang Xinyu	Eighteen Springs (1997)	Janine Chang as Gu Manzhen (顾曼桢); Zhang Xinyu as Gu Manlu (顾曼璐)	Janine Chang wins, 335 votes to 81
2	15 September 2018	2-1; Actors compete	2	Kan Qingzi; Xu Lu	Soul Mate (2016)	Kan Qingzi as Qiyue (七月); Xu Lu as Ansheng (安生)	Kan Qingzi wins, 321 votes to 104
2	15 September 2018	2-1; Actors compete	3	Qi Xi; Tu Songyan	Echoes of the Rainbow (2010)	Qi Xi as Mrs. Luo (罗太太); Tu Songyan as Luo (老罗)	Tu Songyan wins, 300 votes to 133
3	22 September 2018	2-2; Ann Hui's short film	1	Janine Chang; Wu Xiubo	(留情)	Janine Chang as Zhang Jinyun (张锦云); Wu Xiubo as Mr. Wang (王先生); Tu Songyan as a spy (特务)	Wu Xiubo wins, 228 votes to 154
3	22 September 2018	3-1; Actors compete	1	Lan Xi; Wang Yuanke; Yang Rong	(后宫)	Lan Xi as An Yao (安瑶); Wang Yuanke as Wan Qing (婉晴); Yang Rong as Consort Jing (静妃)	Yang Rong wins, 186 votes to 172 (Wang Yuanke) and 63 (Lan Xi)
3	22 September 2018	3-1; Actors compete	2	Jin Shijia; Song Yi	The Great Hypnotist (2014)	Jin Shijia as Xu Ruining (徐瑞宁); Song Yi as Ren Xiaoyan (任小妍)	Jin Shijia wins, 318 votes to 107
3	22 September 2018	3-1; Actors compete	3	Sun Qian; Zhang Xiaofei	Blind Mountain (2007)	Sun Qian as Chen Chunli (陈春丽); Zhang Xiaofei as Bai Xuemei (白雪梅)	Sun Qian wins, 229 votes to 208
4	29 September 2018	3-2; Jia Zhangke's short film	1	Sun Qian; Xu Zheng	(自由发挥)	Sun Qian as a female actor (女演员); Xu Zheng as a male actor (男演员); Jin Shijia as a director (导演)	Xu Zheng wins, 237 votes to 148
4	29 September 2018	4-1; Actors compete	1	Li Xiaomeng; Li Qian	(浪漫的事)	Li Xiaomeng as Song Xue (宋雪); Li Qian as Song Yu (宋雨); Peng Guanying (彭冠英) as Wu Deli (吴德利); Bao Jianfeng as Guo Mingda (郭明达)	Li Qian wins, 308 votes to 114
4	29 September 2018	4-1; Actors compete	2	Li Landi; Han Xue	The Flowers of War (2011)	Li Landi as Shu Juan (书娟); Han Xue as Yu Mo (玉墨)	Han Xue wins, 222 votes to 203
4	29 September 2018	4-1; Actors compete	3	Li Chun; He Hongshan	The Banquet (2006)	Li Chun as Empress Wan (婉后); He Hongshan as Qing (青女)	Li Chun wins, 253 votes to 154
4	29 September 2018	4-2; Actors' impromptu performance	1	Li Qian; Han Xue; Li Chun	(等待)	Li Qian, Han Xue, and Li Chun as a mother (母亲); Xu Zheng as a police station director (派出所长)	
5	6 October 2018	4-3; Lu Chuan's short film	1	Han Xue; Zhang Ziyi	(女儿)	Han Xue as Xiao Xin's mother (小新妈妈); Zhang Ziyi as Xiao Wen's mother (小雯妈妈); Li Landi as Xiao Wen (小雯)	Zhang Ziyi wins, 247 votes to 143
5	6 October 2018	5-1; Actors compete	1	Yang Di; Cao Bingkun; Baby Zhang; Wang Maolei	One Night in Supermarket (2009)	Yang Di as Lun Tai (轮胎); Cao Bingkun as He Sanshui (何三水); Baby Zhang as Tang Xiaolian (唐晓莲); Wang Maolei as Wang Chao (王超)	Wang Maolei wins, 272 votes to 228 (Cao Bingkun), 126 (Baby Zhang) and 108 (Yang Di)
5	6 October 2018	5-1; Actors compete	2	Hai Lu; Jiang Mengjie; Zhang Xincheng	The Last Emperor (1987)	Hai Lu as Wanrong; Jiang Mengjie as Wenxiu; Zhang Xincheng as Puyi	Jiang Mengjie wins, 242 votes to 101 (Zhang Xincheng) and Hai Lu (96); Zhang Xincheng is revived by Yu Hewei
5	6 October 2018	5-1; Actors compete	3	Li Nian; Wang Xiaochen	The First Half of My Life (2017)	Li Nian as Luo Zijun (罗子君); Wang Xiaochen as Tang Jing (唐晶); Victor Huang as He Han (贺涵)	Wang Xiaochen wins, 233 votes to 214
6	13 October 2018	5-2; Joan Chen's short film	1	Wang Xiaochen; Yu Hewei (于和伟)	(公车上的曹操)	Wang Xiaochen as Mrs. He (何嫂); Yu Hewei as He (老何)	Yu Hewei wins, 263 votes to 121
6	13 October 2018	6-1; Actors compete	1	Guo Qilin; Jing Chao; Cao Jun	Soldiers Sortie (2006)	Guo Qilin as Bai Tiejun (白铁军); Jing Chao as Shi Jin (史今); Cao Jun as Xu Sanduo (许三多)	Guo Qilin wins, 166 votes to 142 (Cao Jun) and 122 (Jing Chao); Jing Chao is revived by Carina Lau
6	13 October 2018	6-1; Actors compete	2	Xue Jianing; Cao Xiwen; Wang Yang	In Love We Trust (2007)	Xue Jianing as Mei Zhu (枚竹); Cao Xiwen as Dong Fan (董帆); Wang Yang as Xiao Lu (肖路)	Wang Yang wins, 183 votes to 146 (Xue Jianing) and Cao Xiwen (96)
7	20 October 2018	6-1; Actors compete	3	Liu Huan; Lin Peng; Li Sheng	Midnight Diner (2017)	Liu Huan as Mark (马克); Lin Peng as Ai Zhen (艾真); Li Sheng as Ling Ling (玲玲); Kara Hui as a proprietress (老板娘)	Liu Huan wins, 193 votes to 128 (Li Sheng) and 114 (Lin Peng)
7	20 October 2018	7-1; Actors compete	1	Shen Chunyang; Du Ruoxi	The Spring Festival (1991)	Shen Chunyang as Wang Mei (王梅); Du Ruoxi as Cheng Ping (程萍); Xiaoshenyang as Cheng Zhi (程志); Liu Tianzuo (刘天佐) as Qin Dachuan (秦大川)	Shen Chunyang wins, 198 votes to 145; she is waitlisted by Xu Zheng and Zhang Ziyi
7	20 October 2018	7-1; Actors compete	2	Sun Jian; Zhang Meng; Tan Jianci; Jiang Kaitong; Fang Zibin; Fan Tiantian	Beijing Love Story (2014)	Sun Jian as Wang Daqi (王大奇); Zhang Meng as Hai Ping (海萍); Tan Jianci as Chen Feng (陈锋); Jiang Kaitong as Shen Yan (沉彦); Fang Zibin as Su Chun (苏淳); Fan Tiantian as Gao Xia (高霞)	Tan Jianci wins, 286 votes to 260 (Fan Tiantian), 135 (Zhang Meng), 129 (Sun Jian), 126 (Fang Zibin) and 75 (Jiang Kaitong)
8	27 October 2018	6-2; Hu Mei's short film	1	Liu Huan; Kara Hui	(儿子的歌声)	Liu Huan as a policeman (警察); Kara Hui as a mother (母亲)	Kara Hui wins, 203 votes to 184
8	27 October 2018	7-1; Actors compete	3	Zhang Zhilü; He Dujuan; Hong Bingyao; Shao Weitong	iPartment (2009)	Zhang Zhilü as Lü Ziqiao (吕子乔); He Dujuan as Meijia (美嘉); Hong Bingyao as Wanyu (婉瑜); Shao Weitong as Zhanbo (展博)	Shao Weitong wins, 168 votes to 164 (Zhang Zhilü), 146 (He Dujuan) and 98 (Hong Bingyao); he is waitlisted by Wu Xiubo, Xu Zheng and Zhang Ziyi
8	27 October 2018	7-1; Actors compete	4	Yin Xiaotian; Han Dong; Jia Chenfei; Yu Xiaotong	My Chief and My Regiment (2009)	Yin Xiaotian as Long Wenzhang (龙文章); Han Dong as Lin Yi (林译); Jia Chenfei as Zhang Milong (张迷龙); Yu Xiaotong as Meng Fanliao (孟烦了)	Han Dong wins, 186 votes to 164 (Yu Xiaotong), 152 (Yin Xiaotian) and 132 (Jia Chenfei); he is waitlisted by Xu Zheng and Zhang Ziyi
8	27 October 2018	7-1; Actors compete	5	Liu Yase; Gao Xiaofei; Tian Yuan; Wang Wanjuan	(外来妹; 1991)	Liu Yase as Jing (靓女); Gao Xiaofei as A Fang (阿芳); Tian Yuan as Xiu Ying (秀英); Wang Wanjuan as Zhao Xiaoyun (赵小云)	Liu Yase wins, 252 votes to 210 (Wang Wanjuan), 148 (Gao Xiaofei) and 64 (Tian Yuan)
8	27 October 2018	7-2; Selection of waitlisted actors	1	17 waitlisted actors	—	—	Fan Tiantian is revived by Lee Li-chun
8	27 October 2018	8-1; Selection for mentor teams	1	Yang Rong; Li Chun; Hai Lu	Youth (2017)	Yang Rong as He Xiaoping (何小萍); Li Chun as Lin Dingding (林丁丁); Hai Lu as Xiao Suizi (萧穗子); Xie Na as a team leader (分队长)	
8	27 October 2018	8-1; Selection for mentor teams	2	Li Landi; Guo Qilin; Tu Songyan; Ren Suxi; Jin Shijia; Zhang Xincheng	Reply 1988 (2015)	Li Landi as Lin Qiuyang (林秋阳); Guo Qilin as Zhou Jianyu (周建宇); Tu Songyan as Lin Jianjun (林建军); Ren Suxi as Zhao Meilan (赵美兰); Jin Shijia as Liu Haipi (刘海皮); Zhang Xincheng as Zhou Chenxi (周晨曦); Kou Zhenhai (寇振海) as Liu Ertie (刘二铁)	Jin Shijia joins Wu Xiubo's team; Li Landi, selected by Xu Zheng and Zhang Ziyi, joins Zhang Ziyi's team
9	3 November 2018	8-1; Selection for mentor teams	3	Zhang Xiaofei; Song Yi; Wang Yang; Du Chun	(潜伏; 2008)	Zhang Xiaofei as Cui Ping (翠平); Song Yi as Zuo Lan (左蓝); Wang Yang as Yu Zecheng (余则成); Du Chun as Li Ya (李涯)	Wang Yang joins Xu Zheng's team
9	3 November 2018	8-1; Selection for mentor teams	4	Fan Tiantian; Liu Yase; Kan Qingzi; Han Xue	Penitentiary Angel (女儿谷; 1996)	Fan Tiantian as Xiao Nanren (小男人); Liu Yase as Pan Taohua (潘桃花); Kan Qingzi as Ding Jing'er (丁静儿); Han Xue as Lin Feifei (林霏霏)	Kan Qingzi joins Xu Zheng's team; Han Xue, selected by Wu Xiubo and Zhang Ziyi, joins Zhang Ziyi's team
9	3 November 2018	8-1; Selection for mentor teams	5	Janine Chang; Liu Huan; Wang Maolei; Tan Jianci	Brotherhood of Blades II: The Infernal Battlefield (2017)	Janine Chang as Ding Baiying (丁白缨); Liu Huan as Lu Wenzhao (陆文昭); Wang Maolei as Wei Zhongxian; Tan Jianci as Zhu Youjian	Tan Jianci joins Xu Zheng's team; Liu Huan, selected by Wu Xiubo and Zhang Ziyi, joins Wu Xiubo's team
10	10 November 2018	8-1; Selection for mentor teams	6	Xu Jiao; Sun Qian; Li Qian; Wang Xiaochen; Jing Chao	Ke Wang (1990)	Xu Jiao as; Sun Qian as; Li Qian as; Wang Xiaochen as; Jing Chao as	
10	10 November 2018	7-3; Stanley Kwan's short film	1	Lee Li-chun; Zhang Meng	First Night Nerves (八个女人一台戏; 2018)		
